= List of candidates in the 2010 Dutch general election =

Prior to the 2010 Dutch general election, contesting parties put forward party lists.

== 1: Christian Democratic Appeal ==
Candidate list for the Christian Democratic Appeal
Position	Candidate	Votes	Result
1	Jan Peter Balkenende	947,785	Elected, but declined
2	Ank Bijleveld	49,036	Elected
3	Maxime Verhagen	56,106	Elected
4	Ab Klink	33,115	Elected
5	Marja van Bijsterveldt	10,137	Elected
6	Jan Kees de Jager	46,452	Elected
7	Joop Atsma	22,003	Elected
8	Elly Blanksma-van den Heuvel	5,414	Elected
9	Gerda Verburg	5,166	Elected
10	Sybrand van Haersma Buma	850	Elected
11	Ger Koopmans	10,887	Elected
12	Henk Jan Ormel	7,413	Elected
13	Mirjam Sterk	5,313	Elected
14	Eddy van Hijum	1,142	Elected
15	Jack de Vries	2,137	Elected, but declined
16	Margreeth Smilde	1,330	Elected
17	Madeleine van Toorenburg	1,126	Elected
18	Coskun Çörüz	2,110	Elected
19	Kathleen Ferrier	1,269	Elected
20	Ad Koppejan	3,604	Elected
21	Hanke Bruins Slot	746	Elected
22	Sander de Rouwe	3,270	Replacement
23	Raymond Knops	4,310	Replacement
24	Bas Jan van Bochove	409	Replacement
25	Rikus Jager	2,055	
26	Maarten Haverkamp	583	Replacement
27	Jan Schinkelshoek	304	
28	Jan Jacob van Dijk	514	
29	Pieter Omtzigt	4,718	Replacement
30	Jack Biskop	1,807	Replacement
31	Sabine Uitslag	15,933	Replacement
32	Marieke van der Werf	452	Replacement
33	Michiel Holtackers	291	Replacement
34	Ciska Joldersma	741	Replacement
35	Hein Pieper	1,570	
36	Joost Verheijen	201	
37	Jan Mastwijk	4,635	
38	Martijn van Helvert	8,343	
39	Alwin de Jong	296	
40	Jaco Geurts	2,276	
41	Mustafa Amhaouch	1,680	
42	Arnoud Strijbis	268	
43	Harry van der Molen	304	
44	Anke van Extel-van Katwijk	2,071	
45	Olger van Dijk	198	
46	Anne-Marie Vreman-Muijrers	329	
47	Dinand Ekkel	161	
48	Marga Vermue-Vermue	529	
49	Arinda Callewaert-de Groot	186	
50	Marijn Noordam-ter Maat	399	
51	Frank van Kuppeveld	1,230	
52	Monique Smidt-Beudeker	447	
53	Gerben Karssenberg	188	
54	Patricia Assmann	1,505	
55	Jan Folkert Deinum	234	
56	Daniëlle van Lith-Woestenberg	772	
57	Jobke Vonk-Vedder	152	
58	Maarten Offinga	172	
59	Marja Kwast-van Duursen	196	
60	Jan Kramer	599	
61	David Moolenburgh	93	
62	Elsa Rijssenbeek-van Pijkeren	131	
63	Guus Mulders	181	
64	Martijn de Haas	99	
65	Erik van den Oord	169	
66	Erna van de Ven	296	
67	Mona Keijzer	442	
68	Brigit Homan	106	
69	Marij Cox-Sevenich	1,102	
70	Clazinus Netjes	138	
71	Sjoerd Meulensteen	79	
72	Willem Ketelaars	583	
73	Rex Arendsen	110	
74	Yang Soo Kloosterhof	247	
75	Peter Ruys	641	
Total			

== 2: Labour Party ==
Candidate list for the Labour Party
Position	Candidate	Votes	Result
1	Job Cohen	1,510,203	Elected
2	Nebahat Albayrak	129,005	Elected
3	Ronald Plasterk	32,296	Elected
4	Mariëtte Hamer	14,662	Elected
5	Jeroen Dijsselbloem	3,010	Elected
6	Jetta Klijnsma	20,050	Elected
7	Diederik Samsom	10,982	Elected
8	Gerdi Verbeet	4,317	Elected
9	Frans Timmermans	8,684	Elected
10	Sharon Dijksma	7,876	Elected
11	Hans Spekman	3,718	Elected
12	Angelien Eijsink	1,217	Elected
13	Martijn van Dam	1,774	Elected
14	Attje Kuiken	2,974	Elected
15	Ahmed Marcouch	14,298	Elected
16	Roos Vermeij	864	Elected
17	Ed Groot	510	Elected
18	Sjoera Dikkers	698	Elected
19	Pierre Heijnen	621	Elected
20	Lea Bouwmeester	1,658	Elected
21	Jeroen Recourt	222	Elected
22	Agnes Wolbert	3,204	Elected
23	Eelke van der Veen	486	Elected
24	Pauline Smeets	3,094	Elected
25	Metin Çelik	7,560	Elected
26	Lutz Jacobi	5,109	Elected
27	Tjeerd van Dekken	2,958	Elected
28	Tanja Jadnanansing	7,784	Elected
29	Jacques Monasch	934	Elected
30	Khadija Arib	5,121	Elected
31	Jeroen de Lange	426	Replacement
32	Myrthe Hilkens	700	Replacement
33	John Leerdam	3,341	Replacement
34	Margot Kraneveldt-van der Veen	438	Replacement
35	Mohamed Mohandis	4,379	
36	Lia Roefs	770	
37	Jan Boelhouwer	851	
38	Mei Li Vos	10,200	
39	Henk Nijboer	451	
40	Anja Timmer	1,756	
41	Paul Kalma	452	
42	Brigitte Troost	530	
43	Jan Vos	447	
44	Marianne Besselink	1,487	
45	Wouter Neerings	226	
46	Keklik Yücel	2,886	
47	Serv Wiemers	128	
48	Saskia Laaper-ter Steege	864	
49	Hans Spigt	289	
50	Marije van den Berg	913	
51	Thijs Reuten	2,935	
52	Ria Oonk	487	
53	Sander Terphuis	636	
54	Chantal Gill’ard	436	
55	Hans Adriani	186	
56	Loes Ypma	395	
57	Ard van der Tuuk	181	
58	Patricia Linhard	225	
59	Meint Helder	104	
60	Grace Tanamal	657	
61	Inge Polstra	148	
62	Gülhan Akdemir	1,440	
63	Joyce Vermue	320	
64	Karin Hazewinkel	365	
65	Martientje Kuitenbrouwer	155	
66	Maarten Divendal	245	
67	Marijke Drees	470	
68	Jan Hamming	567	
69	Hedy d'Ancona	675	
70	Lodewijk de Waal	755	
Total			

== 3: Socialist Party ==
Candidate list for the Socialist Party
Position	Candidate	Votes	Result
1	Emile Roemer	794,570	Elected
2	Harry van Bommel	15,956	Elected
3	Jan de Wit	12,555	Elected
4	Renske Leijten	41,115	Elected
5	Ronald van Raak	2,583	Elected
6	Ewout Irrgang	2,179	Elected
7	Sadet Karabulut	10,007	Elected
8	Paul Ulenbelt	996	Elected
9	Jasper van Dijk	1,785	Elected
10	Sharon Gesthuizen	3,358	Elected
11	Henk van Gerven	1,776	Elected
12	Manja Smits	2,503	Elected
13	Paulus Jansen	966	Elected
14	Farshad Bashir	1,303	Elected
15	Nine Kooiman	1,533	Elected
16	Rik Janssen	374	Replacement
17	Nico Heijmans	1,080	
18	Hans van Leeuwen	418	
19	Arnout Hoekstra	654	
20	Jessica van Ruitenburg	2,105	
21	Krista van Velzen	3,368	
22	Ron Meyer	1,639	
23	Maarten Hijink	279	
24	Nicole van Gemert	879	
25	Michiel van Nispen	1,025	
26	Fons Luijben	375	
27	Gerrie Elfrink	949	
28	Jos van der Horst	1,585	
29	Hennie Hemmes	1,360	
30	Hilde van der Molen	510	
31	Mariska ten Heuw	1,736	
32	Marianne Langkamp	583	
33	Jules Iding	399	
34	Remine Alberts-Oosterbaan	307	
35	Theo Coşkun	643	
36	Tonnie Wouters-van Broekhoven	678	
37	Riet de Wit-Romans	1,150	
38	Bernard Gerard	927	
39	Jan Broekema	830	
40	Frans Mulckhuijse	277	
41	Saíd Afalah	822	
42	Jeroen Brouwer	296	
43	Willy Lourenssen	381	
44	Willem Bouman	502	
45	Ingrid Gyömörei-Agelink	259	
46	Wim van Gammeren	235	
47	Jannie Visscher	1,855	
48	Sibel Özeĝul-Özen	1,355	
49	Bart Vermeulen	289	
50	Lies van Aelst	1,387	
Total			

== 4: People's Party for Freedom and Democracy ==
Candidate list for the People's Party for Freedom and Democracy
Position	Candidate	Votes	Result
1	Mark Rutte	1,617,636	Elected
2	Edith Schippers	77,084	Elected
3	Fred Teeven	63,384	Elected
4	Jeanine Hennis-Plasschaert	37,944	Elected
5	Stef Blok	4,127	Elected
6	Paul de Krom	2,054	Elected
7	Frans Weekers	12,913	Elected
8	Atzo Nicolaï	3,679	Elected
9	Charlie Aptroot	4,650	Elected
10	Betty de Boer	9,028	Elected
11	Halbe Zijlstra	2,139	Elected
12	Anouchka van Miltenburg	3,772	Elected
13	Han ten Broeke	6,508	Elected
14	Ineke Dezentjé Hamming-Bluemink	5,230	Elected
15	Willibrord van Beek	2,002	Elected
16	Cora van Nieuwenhuizen	4,164	Elected
17	Janneke Snijder-Hazelhoff	8,220	Elected
18	Malik Azmani	1,605	Elected
19	Helma Neppérus	1,649	Elected
20	Ton Elias	2,084	Elected
21	Mark Harbers	2,063	Elected
22	Brigitte van der Burg	1,686	Elected
23	Tamara Venrooy-van Ark	1,741	Elected
24	Anne Mulder	1,467	Elected
25	Erik Ziengs	8,092	Elected
26	Ard van der Steur	1,273	Elected
27	Klaas Dijkhoff	1,985	Elected
28	Helma Lodders	1,630	Elected
29	Anne-Wil Lucas-Smeerdijk	2,028	Elected
30	André Bosman	1,201	Elected
31	Afke Schaart	1,079	Elected
32	René Leegte	1,774	Replacement
33	Karin Straus	5,377	Replacement
34	Joost Taverne	494	Replacement
35	Johan Houwers	3,013	Replacement
36	Bart de Liefde	1,727	Replacement
37	Matthijs Huizing	1,149	Replacement
38	Ingrid de Caluwé	1,085	Replacement
39	Ybeltje Berckmoes-Duindam	935	Replacement
40	Bart Keuper	778	
41	Alexander Dalenoort	166	
42	Aukje de Vries	1,292	
43	Jeroen van Wijngaarden	504	
44	Pieter van Woensel	243	
45	Ronald Vuijk	247	
46	Monique Belinfante-van Gelder	1,156	
47	Onno Aerden	400	
48	Jeroen Diepemaat	739	
49	Paul Laudy	176	
50	Jeltje Hoekstra-Sikkema	1,260	
51	Jakob Bartelds	1,863	
52	Roald van der Linde	580	
53	Tanja Haseloop-Amsing	529	
54	Henk de Vlaming	463	
55	Christophe van der Maat	456	
56	Daan de Neef	183	
57	Johan Pieter Verwey	116	
58	Bernd Roks	395	
59	Kamran Ullah	445	
60	Tatjana Šormaz	802	
61	Petra Borst	730	
62	Eric van den Dungen	306	
63	Frits Paymans	602	
64	Jan Willem Pieters	419	
65	Alex van Pelt	264	
66	Laura Werger	765	
67	Erwin Hoogland	402	
68	Hans Aeijelts Averink	180	
69	Frank Verveld	445	
70	Erik Koppe	978	
71	Jan Verhoeven	456	
72	Kees Gillis	281	
73	Herman van Santen	1,283	
Total			

== 5: Party for Freedom ==
Candidate list for the Party for Freedom
Position	Candidate	Votes	Result
1	Geert Wilders	1,376,938	Elected
2	Fleur Agema	31,486	Elected
3	Lilian Helder	5,793	Elected
4	Raymond de Roon	1,640	Elected
5	Martin Bosma	1,955	Elected
6	Sietse Fritsma	1,010	Elected
7	Teun van Dijck	1,039	Elected
8	Louis Bontes	769	Elected
9	Dion Graus	2,435	Elected
10	Richard de Mos	749	Elected
11	Hero Brinkman	18,865	Elected
12	Eric Lucassen	461	Elected
13	Roland van Vliet	1,112	Elected
14	Johan Driessen	233	Elected
15	Karen Gerbrands	559	Elected
16	Joram van Klaveren	321	Elected
17	Marcial Hernandez	477	Elected
18	Willie Dille	374	Elected
19	Léon de Jong	424	Elected
20	Harm Beertema	235	Elected
21	James Sharpe	148	Elected
22	Wim Kortenoeven	319	Elected
23	Jhim van Bemmel	226	Elected
24	André Elissen	167	Elected
25	Ino van den Besselaar	117	Replacement
26	Auke Zijlstra	335	
27	Alexander Kops	319	
28	Jasper van Koppen	368	
29	Olav Spierings	658	
30	Edgar Mulder	892	
31	Vicky Maeijer	336	
32	Marjolein Faber	327	
33	Marissa Visser	237	
34	Marc van den Berg	492	
35	Monica Nunes	266	
36	Vincent van Haaren	159	
37	Pascal Romeijn	175	
38	Marjolein van de Waal	256	
39	René Eekhuis	49	
40	Ron Dubbelman	60	
41	Toon van Dijk	69	
42	Machiel de Graaf	61	
43	Arnoud van Doorn	32	
44	Laurens van Delft	93	
45	Menno Ludriks	126	
46	Chris van der Helm	69	
47	Barry Madlener	260	
48	Gom van Strien	1,002	
Total			

== 6: GroenLinks ==
Candidate list for GroenLinks
Position	Candidate	Votes	Result
1	Femke Halsema	577,126	Elected
2	Jolande Sap	8,451	Elected
3	Tofik Dibi	6,089	Elected
4	Mariko Peters	3,988	Elected
5	Ineke van Gent	7,215	Elected
6	Liesbeth van Tongeren	2,637	Elected
7	Jesse Klaver	2,466	Elected
8	Bruno Braakhuis	879	Elected
9	Arjan El Fassed	1,262	Elected
10	Linda Voortman	1,664	Elected
11	Rik Grashoff	990	Replacement
12	Niels van den Berge	596	Replacement
13	Natasja van den Berg	858	
14	Bert van Boggelen	514	
15	Carla van Os	643	
16	Hann van Schendel	502	
17	Arno Uijlenhoet	289	
18	Ruard Ganzevoort	869	
19	Nadya van Putten	1,729	
20	Ahmed Harika	1,343	
21	Hayat Barrahmun	1,606	
22	Paul Smeulders	345	
23	Gon Mevis	527	
24	René Kerkwijk	377	
25	Isabella Diks	771	
26	Leen Harpe	275	
27	Irona Groeneveld	615	
28	Jan Wijnia	708	
29	Tof Thissen	874	
30	Kathalijne Buitenweg	1,888	
Total			

== 7: Christian Union ==
Candidate list for the Christian Union
Position	Candidate	Votes	Result
1	André Rouvoet	254,524	Elected
2	Arie Slob	10,532	Elected
3	Esmé Wiegman-van Meppelen Scheppink	10,459	Elected
4	Joël Voordewind	3,813	Elected
5	Cynthia Ortega-Martijn	2,983	Elected
6	Carola Schouten	1,299	Replacement
7	Ernst Cramer	1,178	
8	Martine Vonk	2,955	
9	Ed Anker	5,890	
10	IJmert Muilwijk	685	
11	Reinier Koppelaar	386	
12	Gert-Jan Segers	511	
13	Simone Kennedy-Doornbos	489	
14	Jacqueline Koops-Scheele	231	
15	André Oldenkamp	182	
16	Klaas Pieter Derks	102	
17	Leon Meijer	580	
18	Theo Krins	310	
19	Mirjam Bikker	297	
20	Hugo Scherff	316	
21	Ruud van Eijle	294	
22	Stieneke van der Graaf	772	
23	Paul Blokhuis	331	
24	Piet Adema	533	
25	Frans Hamelink	148	
26	Ron de Rover	168	
27	Menno Helmus	189	
28	Herman Selderhuis	304	
29	Gijsbert van den Brink	125	
30	Pascal Frissen	299	
31	Ben Visser	289	
32	Janine Clement-de Jonge	144	
33	Frank Visser	291	
34	Remco Oosterhoff	96	
35	Peter de Kluijver	144	
36	Marcel Companjen	189	
37	Silva Visser-van Eijk	125	
38	Ard Kleijer	130	
39	Shamir Ceuleers	79	
40	Hermen Vreugdenhil	123	
41	Jonathan van der Geer	702	
42	Harry Philipsen	143	
43	Kees Tadema	120	
44	Annelies van der Kolk	168	
45	Michel du Chatinier	58	
46	Kees van der Elst	69	
47	David de Jong	409	
48	Ko Jansen	216	
49	Gert Schouwstra	294	
50	Dick Schutte	420	
Total			

== 8: Democrats 66 ==
Candidate list for the Democrats 66
Position	Candidate	Votes	Result
1	Alexander Pechtold	507,187	Elected
2	Boris van der Ham	42,296	Elected
3	Magda Berndsen-Jansen	36,151	Elected
4	Gerard Schouw	1,594	Elected
5	Fatma Koşer-Kaya	18,837	Elected
6	Wassila Hachchi	3,863	Elected
7	Stientje van Veldhoven	3,441	Elected
8	Wouter Koolmees	1,927	Elected
9	Kees Verhoeven	953	Elected
10	Marty Smits	970	
11	Judith Swinkels	2,437	
12	Jan Paternotte	1,280	
13	Pia Dijkstra	15,705	Elected
14	Maas Goote	556	
15	Steven van Weyenberg	387	
16	Christa Meindersma	1,052	
17	Mieke Ansems	896	
18	Fleur Gräper-van Koolwijk	3,560	
19	Meine Henk Klijnsma	278	
20	Jeroen Bartelse	369	
21	Wimar Jaeger	666	
22	Gerhard Mulder	435	
23	Michiel Verkoulen	330	
24	Ad van Vugt	133	
25	Marieke van den Akker	385	
26	Thijs Mulder	1,362	
27	Kees de Zeeuw	850	
28	Paul Wessels	608	
29	Mark Sluiter	432	
30	Constantijn Dolmans	104	
31	Marion Wichard	308	
32	Bart Vink	186	
33	Robert Farla	120	
34	Raoul Boucke	136	
35	Maudy Keulemans	285	
36	Karen Jedema	208	
37	André Hoogendijk	127	
38	Frederique Petit	285	
39	Iwan Rutjens	83	
40	Meine Oosten	248	
41	Martin Maassen	338	
42	Robin Hartogh Heys van de Lier	344	
43	Jurr van Dalen	232	
44	Rineke Gieske-Mastenbroek	566	
45	Paul de Winter	114	
46	Joke Geldhof	166	
47	Marianne Spangenberg-Carlier	241	
48	Bob van den Bos	85	
49	Arthie Schimmel	402	
50	Luc Verburgh	649	
Total			

== 9: Party for the Animals ==
Candidate list for the Party for the Animals
Position	Candidate	Votes	Result
1	Marianne Thieme	98,591	Elected
2	Esther Ouwehand	12,713	Elected
3	Anja Hazekamp	1,836	Replacement
4	Frank Wassenberg	1,889	
5	Bram van Liere	694	
6	Luuk Folkerts	418	
7	Estefania Pampin Zuidmeer	437	
8	Jasmijn de Boo	691	
9	Luuk van der Veer	512	
10	Johnas van Lammeren	662	
11	Marieke de Groot	716	
12	Willem van der Steeg	173	
13	Barbara van Genne	625	
14	Harry Voss	577	
15	Ton Oomen	293	
16	Annemarie van Gelder	664	
17	Jan Peter Cruiming	826	
Total			

== 10: Reformed Political Party ==
Number	Candidate	Votes	Result
1	Kees van der Staaij	152,493	Elected
2	Elbert Dijkgraaf	2,143	Elected
3	Roelof Bisschop	3,480	
4	Servaas Stoop	639	
5	Hans Tanis	277	
6	Diederik van Dijk	238	
7	Geert Schipaanboord	388	
8	Arnold Weggeman	189	
9	Wim van Duijn	522	
10	Peter Zevenbergen	253	
11	Christian van Bemmel	144	
12	Leendert de Knegt	392	
13	Dirk van Dijk	167	
14	Rien Bogerd	445	
15	Dick van Meeuwen	133	
16	Teun van Oostenbrugge	103	
17	Ewart Bosma	232	
18	Jan Noeverman	39	
19	Tom Bakker	103	
20	Richard Donk	79	
21	Jan Luteijn	111	
22	Marcel de Haas	100	
23	Leo Barth	56	
24	Peter Schalk	107	
25	Adri van Heteren	176	
26	Henk Kievit	108	
27	Ad Dorst	82	
28	Henk Massink	50	
29	Wim de Vries	107	
30	Jan Willem Benschop	234	

== 12: Nieuw Nederland ==
Candidate list for Nieuw Nederland
Position	Candidate	Votes	Result
1	Jan-Frank Koers	1,177	
2	Cora Scherp	203	
3	Henrick Fabius	50	
4	Iwanjka Geerdink	58	
5	Gérard van Elsen	36	
6	Hugo Labout	27	
7	Eric Leltz	14	
8	Christel Baijens	24	
9	Chiel Reemer	16	
10	Arthur Glorie	18	
11	Brigitte van Hengel	24	
12	Pascal Dolleman	18	
13	Els Beljaars	15	
14	Jeroen Arents	19	
15	Wilko Jansen	9	
16	Ronald Dolleman	7	
17	Henk Fokker	14	
18	Tamara Janssen	14	
19	Otto Storm van ’s Gravesande	7	
20	Hanneke Bijl	12	
21	Ron Walter	23	
22	Richard Huisken	27	
23	Marion Louwen	54	
24	André Vredegoor	9	
25	Danny Schmitz	24	
26	Pauline Sibbel	12	
27	Jolanda Verburg	7	
28	Dick de Groot	10	
29	Martijn Brasem	9	
30	Jan Mellink	21	
31	Jenny Koers	52	
Total			

== 13: Proud of the Netherlands ==
Candidate list for Proud of the Netherlands
Position	Candidate	Votes	Result
1	Rita Verdonk	49,992	
2	Arthur van der Putte	446	
3	Carel Hoffman	122	
4	Kees Koppens	184	
5	Dirk Uittenbogaard	106	
6	Roel Martens	69	
7	Olof-Jan Smits	51	
8	Mark Liedekerken	244	
9	André Hanekamp	52	
10	Hanno Hoekstra	63	
11	Jacques Arntz	107	
12	Luc van Hoek	77	
13	Suzanne den Dulk-Winder	310	
14	Martin Hagen	50	
15	André Jansen	36	
16	Harry Bakker	76	
17	Reginald Melchers	57	
18	Fred Kruijer	35	
19	Koos Bergwerff	44	
20	Hein Stulemeijer	31	
21	Nicole Bakker	91	
22	Dolf Mauritz	22	
23	Loet Donkers	15	
24	René Lancee	43	
25	Anna Maslow	77	
26	Paul Huzemeier	8	
27	Nathalie de Groot	150	
28	Mark Lucas	83	
29	Henri Baldwin	74	
30	Leo Valkestijn	70	
31	Annemieke Schuller	152	
Total			

== 14: Party for Human and Spirit ==
Candidate list for the Party for Human and Spirit
Position	Candidate	Votes	Result
1	Lea Manders	19,780	
2	Hans van Steenbergen	602	
3	Anna van der Heijden	654	
4	Fleur Been	529	
5	Rob Greuter	128	
6	Peter Hendriksen	208	
7	Willie Cornelis	73	
8	Peter den Boer	82	
9	Arend Zeevat	196	
10	Andries Wijma	84	
11	Rob Brockhus	48	
12	Anneke Singor-Bleeker	193	
13	Trix Kruger	120	
14	Ton van Beers	57	
15	Balder Claassen	75	
16	Meike van Hoek-Steinz	59	
17	Sipke Schoorstra	63	
18	Henk Bosveld	58	
19	Mariska van Dekken	104	
20	Martijn Steinz	29	
21	Edvard Meijer	36	
22	Edwin Heus	67	
23	Christel van den Adel-Vermeeren	148	
24	Richard Hereijgers	106	
25	Vera Koenen	71	
26	Ron Houweling	78	
27	Mahmoud Ibrahim	67	
28	Daniël Luysterburg	30	
29	Edwin de Niet	63	
30	Rieky Peeters	61	
31	Sebastiaan Rink	34	
32	Martijn Holtslag	33	
33	Roelof Timmer	46	
34	Lou Theunissen	30	
35	Ron Scheerder	45	
36	Micha Kuiper	33	
37	Rascha Wisse	70	
38	Ingmar Deenen	28	
39	Jan Storms	77	
40	Hans Stolp	1,931	
Total			

== 15: Heel NL ==
Candidate list for Heel NL
Position	Candidate	Votes	Result
1	Daisha de Wijs-van Geijn	937	
2	Sander de Wijs	86	
3	Maria Vermeulen	93	
4	Ferdinand Bol	139	
Total			

== 16: Partij één ==
Candidate list for Partij één
Position	Candidate	Votes	Result
1	Yesim Candan	1,319	
2	Joziene Jessurun	107	
3	Layana Mokoginta	44	
4	Alwine van Heemstra	56	
5	Nafize Şener	64	
6	Miriam Ruigrok	62	
7	Lies Visscher-Endeveld	43	
8	Meino Zandwijk	29	
9	Huib Poortman	21	
10	Menno Lanting	22	
11	Bart van Kampen	31	
12	Dennis Karpes	21	
13	Harry Starren	17	
14	Mathieu Weggeman	50	
15	Nilgün Yerli	73	
16	Awraham Soetendorp	83	
Total			

== 17: Feijen List ==
Candidate list for the Feijen List
Position	Candidate	Votes	Result
1	Lotte Feijen	6,064	
2	Wing Che Wong	365	
3	Nachshon Rodrigues Pereira	96	
4	Marisja Groen	84	
5	Stephen Arts	43	
6	Michiel Andeweg	36	
7	Mark Meijs	57	
8	Zoey Planjer	54	
9	Jantien Dekker	61	
10	Mirjam van den Biggelaar	66	
11	Marieke Bakker	37	
12	Jessica Bode	25	
13	Edwin Rasser	18	
14	Teun van Gelder	32	
15	Robbin Pruijn	6	
16	Thijs Krens	21	
17	Ronald Glim	53	
18	Stella Mooijman	33	
19	Ali Lotfi	19	
20	Fransie Becker	18	
21	Sebastiaan Andeweg	11	
22	Daniël Asscher	7	
23	Annelot Bakx	14	
24	Pelle van den Bemt	9	
25	Robert Blokker	20	
26	Marjolijn Hulsbos	12	
27	Gerben Hulsegge	11	
28	Pim Lentjes	8	
29	Tommie Lentjes	11	
30	Kim Otten	7	
31	Jocelyn Petter	11	
32	Shalinie Sukhraj	22	
33	Rutger Verburg	12	
34	Patricia de Wit	113	
Total			

== 18: Pirate Party ==
Candidate list for the Pirate Party
Position	Candidate	Votes	Result
1	Samir Allioui	5,310	
2	Eva Jobse	2,204	
3	Ruud Poutsma	350	
4	Dirk Poot	377	
5	Arend Lammertink	188	
6	Wesley Schwengle	338	
7	Bas Koopmans	289	
8	Rodger van Doorn	104	
9	Jorrit Tulp	191	
10	Danny Palic	97	
11	Stefan de Konink	117	
12	Arjen Halma	99	
13	Bas Grasmaijer	364	
14	Robbie Hontelé	443	
Total			

== 19: Evangelical Party Netherlands ==
Candidate list for the Evangelical Party Netherlands
Position	Candidate	Votes	Result
1	Yvette Laclé	646	
2	J. van der Veen	78	
3	L. Heller	16	
4	M.G. van de Beek	7	
5	J. Schuijn	11	
6	K. de Bloois	6	
7	L.J. van de Meer	9	
8	C.J.I. de Boer-Woord	26	
9	J. de Feijter	3	
10	S.O. Cicilia	5	
11	F.A. Laclé	6	
12	C.I. van Eersel	31	
13	G.E.S. Vishnudatt	80	
Total			

== See also ==
- List of members of the House of Representatives of the Netherlands, 2010–2012

== Source ==
- Kiesraad (15 June 2010). "Uitslag Tweede Kamerverkiezing 2010" (PDF) (in Dutch).
