= List of members of the House of Representatives of the Netherlands, 2010–2012 =

House of Representatives, 2010–2012
←	2006–2010	2012–2017	→
- Party composition of the House

Overview
- Legislative body: House of Representatives
- Term: 17 June 2010 – 19 September 2012
- Election: 2010 general election
- Government: First Rutte cabinet VVD: 31 PVV: 24 CDA: 21
- Opposition: SP: 15 PvdD: 2 PvdA: 30 GL: 10 D66: 10 SGP: 2 CU: 5
- Members: 150
- Speaker: Gerdi Verbeet

Between 17 June 2010 and 19 September 2012, 176 individuals served as representatives in the House of Representatives, the 150-seat lower house of the States-General of the Netherlands. After the general election of 9 June 2010, 150 members were elected and installed at the start of the term. There were 26 replacements during the term, some of them temporary. Gerdi Verbeet was re-elected Speaker of the House of Representatives for this period.

After the election, the first Rutte cabinet was formed for this term, consisting of People's Party for Freedom and Democracy (VVD, 31 seats) and Christian Democratic Appeal (CDA, 21 seats), supported by Party for Freedom (PVV, 24 seats). The opposition consisted of Labour Party (PvdA, 30 seats), Socialist Party (SP, 15 seats), Democrats 66 (D66, 10 seats), GroenLinks (GL, 10 seats), Christian Union (CU, 5 seats), Reformed Political Party (SGP, 2 seats) and Party for the Animals (PvdD, 2 seats).

During the term, three member switched their parliamentary group affiliation, changing the party composition of the House of Representatives. (Note: Resignations generally do not affect the balance of power, as replacements are appointed from the party list) Hero Brinkman, Marcial Hernandez and Wim Kortenoeven left the PVV in 2012. Brinkman continued as a single independent member, while Kortenoeven and Hernandez formed a group together. Jhim van Bemmel also left the PVV on 6 July 2012, but this fell entirely in recess, so the change never materialised.

== Members ==
All members are sworn in at the start of the term, even if they are not new. Assumed office in this list therefore refers to the swearing in during this term, while all members are automatically considered to have left office at the end of the term.

Members of the House of Representatives of the Netherlands, 2010–2012
Name	Parliamentary group	Assumed office	Term end	Ref.
Fleur Agema	PVV	17 June 2010	19 September 2012	
Nebahat Albayrak	PvdA	17 June 2010	11 April 2011	
Nebahat Albayrak	PvdA	2 August 2011	19 September 2012	
Charlie Aptroot	VVD	17 June 2010	19 September 2012	
Khadija Arib	PvdA	17 June 2010	19 September 2012	
Tamara van Ark	VVD	17 June 2010	19 September 2012	
Joop Atsma	CDA	17 June 2010	13 October 2010 (Note: Left to join the cabinet)	
Malik Azmani	VVD	17 June 2010	19 September 2012	
Farshad Bashir	SP	17 June 2010	19 September 2012	
Willibrord van Beek	VVD	17 June 2010	19 September 2012	
Harm Beertema	PVV	17 June 2010	19 September 2012	
Jhim van Bemmel	PVV	17 June 2010	19 September 2012	
Ybeltje Berckmoes-Duindam	VVD	9 November 2011	19 September 2012	
Niels van den Berge	GL	12 January 2011	10 March 2011	
Magda Berndsen	D66	17 June 2010	19 September 2012	
Ino van den Besselaar	PVV	23 November 2010	19 September 2012	
Ank Bijleveld	CDA	17 June 2010	31 December 2010	
Marja van Bijsterveldt	CDA	17 June 2010	13 October 2010	
Jack Biskop	CDA	26 October 2010	19 September 2012	
Elly Blanksma-van den Heuvel	CDA	17 June 2010	19 September 2012	
Stef Blok	VVD	17 June 2010	19 September 2012	
Bas Jan van Bochove	CDA	26 October 2010	19 September 2012	
Louis Bontes	PVV	17 June 2010	19 September 2012	
Betty de Boer	VVD	17 June 2010	19 September 2012	
Harry van Bommel	SP	17 June 2010	19 September 2012	
Martin Bosma	PVV	17 June 2010	19 September 2012	
André Bosman	VVD	17 June 2010	19 September 2012	
Lea Bouwmeester	PvdA	17 June 2010	19 September 2012	
Bruno Braakhuis	GL	17 June 2010	19 September 2012	
Hero Brinkman	PVV (Note: Until 20 March 2012)	17 June 2010	19 September 2012	
Hero Brinkman	Brinkman (Note: Starting 20 March 2012)	17 June 2010	19 September 2012	
Han ten Broeke	VVD	17 June 2010	19 September 2012	
Hanke Bruins Slot	CDA	17 June 2010	19 September 2012	
Brigitte van der Burg	VVD	17 June 2010	19 September 2012	
Ingrid de Caluwé	VVD	1 June 2011	19 September 2012	
Metin Çelik	PvdA	17 June 2010	19 September 2012	
Job Cohen	PvdA	17 June 2010	28 February 2012	
Coşkun Çörüz	CDA	17 June 2010	19 September 2012	
Martijn van Dam	PvdA	17 June 2010	19 September 2012	
Tjeerd van Dekken	PvdA	17 June 2010	19 September 2012	
Ineke Dezentjé Hamming-Bluemink	VVD	17 June 2010	8 November 2011	
Tofik Dibi	GL	17 June 2010	19 September 2012	
Teun van Dijck	PVV	17 June 2010	19 September 2012	
Jasper van Dijk	SP	17 June 2010	19 September 2012	
Elbert Dijkgraaf	SGP	17 June 2010	19 September 2012	
Klaas Dijkhoff	VVD	17 June 2010	19 September 2012	
Sharon Dijksma	PvdA	17 June 2010	17 January 2012	
Sharon Dijksma	PvdA	8 May 2012	19 September 2012	
Pia Dijkstra	D66	17 June 2010	19 September 2012	
Jeroen Dijsselbloem	PvdA	17 June 2010	19 September 2012	
Sjoera Dikkers	PvdA	17 June 2010	19 September 2012	
Willie Dille	PVV	17 June 2010	19 September 2012	
Johan Driessen	PVV	17 June 2010	19 September 2012	
Angelien Eijsink	PvdA	17 June 2010	19 September 2012	
Ton Elias	VVD	17 June 2010	19 September 2012	
André Elissen	PVV	17 June 2010	19 September 2012	
Arjan El Fassed	GL	17 June 2010	19 September 2012	
Kathleen Ferrier	CDA	17 June 2010	19 September 2012	
Sietse Fritsma	PVV	17 June 2010	19 September 2012	
Ineke van Gent	GL	17 June 2010	19 September 2012	
Karen Gerbrands	PVV	17 June 2010	19 September 2012	
Henk van Gerven	SP	17 June 2010	19 September 2012	
Sharon Gesthuizen	SP	17 June 2010	19 September 2012	
Rik Grashoff	GL	23 November 2010	19 September 2012	
Dion Graus	PVV	17 June 2010	19 September 2012	
Ed Groot	PvdA	17 June 2010	19 September 2012	
Wassila Hachchi	D66	17 June 2010	19 September 2012	
Sybrand van Haersma Buma	CDA	17 June 2010	19 September 2012	
Femke Halsema	GL	17 June 2010	11 January 2011	
Boris van der Ham	D66	17 June 2010	19 September 2012	
Mariëtte Hamer	PvdA	17 June 2010	19 September 2012	
Mark Harbers	VVD	17 June 2010	19 September 2012	
Maarten Haverkamp	CDA	26 October 2010	19 September 2012	
Anja Hazekamp	PvdD	24 January 2012	13 May 2012	
Pierre Heijnen	PvdA	17 June 2010	19 September 2012	
Lilian Helder	PVV	17 June 2010	19 September 2012	
Jeanine Hennis-Plasschaert	VVD	17 June 2010	19 September 2012	
Marcial Hernandez	PVV (Note: Until 3 July 2012)	17 June 2010	19 September 2012	
Marcial Hernandez	Kortenoeven/Hernandez (Note: Starting 3 July 2012)	17 June 2010	19 September 2012	
Eddy van Hijum	CDA	17 June 2010	19 September 2012	
Myrthe Hilkens	PvdA	12 April 2011	1 August 2011	
Myrthe Hilkens	PvdA	17 January 2012	19 September 2012	
Michiel Holtackers	CDA	30 June 2011	19 September 2012	
Johan Houwers	VVD	26 October 2010	19 September 2012	
Matthijs Huizing	VVD	26 October 2010	19 September 2012	
Ewout Irrgang	SP	17 June 2010	19 September 2012	
Lutz Jacobi	PvdA	17 June 2010	19 September 2012	
Tanja Jadnanansing	PvdA	17 June 2010	19 September 2012	
Jan Kees de Jager	CDA	17 June 2010	13 October 2010	
Paulus Jansen	SP	17 June 2010	19 September 2012	
Rik Janssen	SP	12 January 2011	13 April 2011	
Cisca Joldersma	CDA	17 January 2012	22 April 2012	
Léon de Jong	PVV	17 June 2010	19 September 2012	
Sadet Karabulut	SP	17 June 2010	10 January 2011	
Sadet Karabulut	SP	14 April 2011	19 September 2012	
Jesse Klaver	GL	17 June 2010	19 September 2012	
Joram van Klaveren	PVV	17 June 2010	19 September 2012	
Jetta Klijnsma	PvdA	17 June 2010	19 September 2012	
Ab Klink	CDA	17 June 2010	6 September 2010	
Raymond Knops	CDA	7 September 2010	19 September 2012	
Nine Kooiman	SP	17 June 2010	19 September 2012	
Wouter Koolmees	D66	17 June 2010	19 September 2012	
Ger Koopmans	CDA	17 June 2010	19 September 2012	
Ad Koppejan	CDA	17 June 2010	19 September 2012	
Wim Kortenoeven	PVV (Note: Until 2 July 2012)	17 June 2010	19 September 2012	
Wim Kortenoeven	Kortenoeven/Hernandez (Note: Starting 3 July 2012)	17 June 2010	19 September 2012	
Fatma Koşer Kaya	D66	17 June 2010	19 September 2012	
Margot Kraneveldt	PvdA	10 April 2012	7 May 2012	
Paul de Krom	VVD	17 June 2010	13 October 2010	
Attje Kuiken	PvdA	17 June 2010	19 September 2012	
Jeroen de Lange	PvdA	25 January 2012	19 September 2012	
René Leegte	VVD	26 October 2010	19 September 2012	
John Leerdam	PvdA	29 February 2012	4 April 2012	
Renske Leijten	SP	17 June 2010	19 September 2012	
Bart de Liefde	VVD	26 October 2010	19 September 2012	
Helma Lodders	VVD	17 June 2010	19 September 2012	
Anne-Wil Lucas-Smeerdijk	VVD	17 June 2010	19 September 2012	
Eric Lucassen	PVV	17 June 2010	19 September 2012	
Ahmed Marcouch	PvdA	17 June 2010	19 September 2012	
Anouchka van Miltenburg	VVD	17 June 2010	19 September 2012	
Jacques Monasch	PvdA	17 June 2010	19 September 2012	
Richard de Mos	PVV	17 June 2010	19 September 2012	
Anne Mulder	VVD	17 June 2010	19 September 2012	
Helma Neppérus	VVD	17 June 2010	19 September 2012	
Atzo Nicolaï	VVD	17 June 2010	31 May 2011	
Cora van Nieuwenhuizen	VVD	17 June 2010	19 September 2012	
Pieter Omtzigt	CDA	26 October 2010	19 September 2012	
Henk Jan Ormel	CDA	17 June 2010	19 September 2012	
Cynthia Ortega	CU	17 June 2010	19 September 2012	
Esther Ouwehand	PvdD	17 June 2010	19 September 2012	
Alexander Pechtold	D66	17 June 2010	19 September 2012	
Mariko Peters	GL	17 June 2010	22 November 2010	
Mariko Peters	GL	11 March 2011	19 September 2012	
Ronald Plasterk	PvdA	17 June 2010	19 September 2012	
Ronald van Raak	SP	17 June 2010	19 September 2012	
Jeroen Recourt	PvdA	17 June 2010	19 September 2012	
Emile Roemer	SP	17 June 2010	19 September 2012	
Raymond de Roon	PVV	17 June 2010	19 September 2012	
André Rouvoet	CU	17 June 2010	17 May 2011	
Sander de Rouwe	CDA	17 June 2010	19 September 2012	
Mark Rutte	VVD	17 June 2010	13 October 2010	
Diederik Samsom	PvdA	17 June 2010	19 September 2012	
Jolande Sap	GL	17 June 2010	19 September 2012	
Afke Schaart	VVD	17 June 2010	19 September 2012	
Edith Schippers	VVD	17 June 2010	13 October 2010	
Carola Schouten	CU	18 May 2011	19 September 2012	
Gerard Schouw	D66	17 June 2010	19 September 2012	
James Sharpe	PVV	17 June 2010	18 November 2010	
Arie Slob	CU	17 June 2010	19 September 2012	
Pauline Smeets	PvdA	17 June 2010	19 September 2012	
Margreeth Smilde	CDA	17 June 2010	19 September 2012	
Manja Smits	SP	17 June 2010	19 September 2012	
Janneke Snijder-Hazelhoff	VVD	17 June 2010	19 September 2012	
Hans Spekman	PvdA	17 June 2010	24 January 2012	
Kees van der Staaij	SGP	17 June 2010	19 September 2012	
Mirjam Sterk	CDA	17 June 2010	19 September 2012	
Ard van der Steur	VVD	17 June 2010	19 September 2012	
Karin Straus	VVD	26 October 2010	19 September 2012	
Joost Taverne	VVD	26 October 2010	19 September 2012	
Fred Teeven	VVD	17 June 2010	13 October 2010	
Marianne Thieme	PvdD	17 June 2010	23 January 2012	
Marianne Thieme	PvdD	15 May 2012	19 September 2012	
Frans Timmermans	PvdA	17 June 2010	19 September 2012	
Liesbeth van Tongeren	GL	17 June 2010	19 September 2012	
Madeleine van Toorenburg	CDA	17 June 2010	19 September 2012	
Sabine Uitslag	CDA	17 June 2010	22 December 2011	
Sabine Uitslag	CDA	23 April 2012	19 September 2012	
Paul Ulenbelt	SP	17 June 2010	19 September 2012	
Eeke van der Veen	PvdA	17 June 2010	19 September 2012	
Stientje van Veldhoven	D66	17 June 2010	19 September 2012	
Gerdi Verbeet	PvdA	17 June 2010	19 September 2012	
Gerda Verburg	CDA	17 June 2010	29 June 2011	
Maxime Verhagen	CDA	17 June 2010	13 October 2010	
Kees Verhoeven	D66	17 June 2010	19 September 2012	
Roos Vermeij	PvdA	17 June 2010	19 September 2012	
Roland van Vliet	PVV	17 June 2010	19 September 2012	
Joël Voordewind	CU	17 June 2010	19 September 2012	
Linda Voortman	GL	17 June 2010	19 September 2012	
Frans Weekers	VVD	17 June 2010	13 October 2010	
Marieke van der Werf	CDA	11 January 2011	19 September 2012	
Esmé Wiegman	CU	17 June 2010	19 September 2012	
Geert Wilders	PVV	17 June 2010	19 September 2012	
Jan de Wit	SP	17 June 2010	19 September 2012	
Agnes Wolbert	PvdA	22 June 2010	19 September 2012	
Erik Ziengs	VVD	17 June 2010	19 September 2012	
Halbe Zijlstra	VVD	17 June 2010	13 October 2010	

== See also ==
- List of candidates in the 2010 Dutch general election
