= Edgar Mulder =

Dutch politician

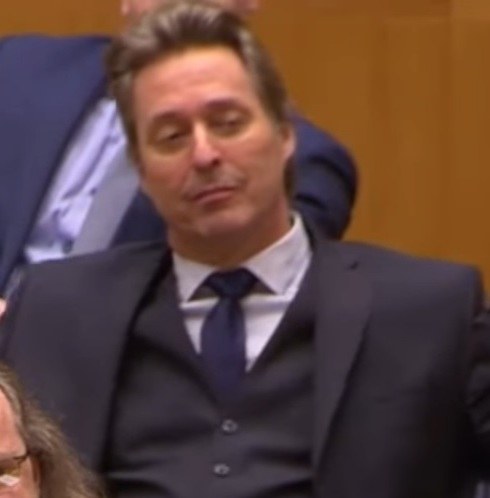

Member of the House of Representatives
- Incumbent
- Assumed office 23 March 2017

Member of the States of Overijssel
- Incumbent
- Assumed office March 2011

Personal details
- Born: 22 November 1961 (age 64) Enschede, Netherlands
- Party: Party for Freedom

Edgar Mulder (Dutch pronunciation: [ˈɛdɡɑr ˈmʏldər, ˈɛtxɑr -]; born 22 November 1961) is a Dutch politician. He has been a member of the House of Representatives representing the Party for Freedom since 23 March 2017 and a member of the States of Overijssel since March 2011. He received a third House term in the 2023 general election, and he served as the party's spokesperson for customs, state ownership, and government benefits before his portfolio changed to occupational disabilities and pensions.

Mulder worked as a sales and account manager for over thirty years before entering politics. He is married with three children and lives in Zwolle.

== Electoral history ==
Electoral history of Edgar Mulder
Year	Body	Party	Pos.	Votes	Result		Ref.
Year	Body	Party	Pos.	Votes	Party seats	Individual	Ref.
2010	House of Representatives	Party for Freedom	30	892	24	Lost	
2012	House of Representatives	Party for Freedom	28	531	15	Lost	
2017	House of Representatives	Party for Freedom	15	1,127	20	Won	
2021	House of Representatives	Party for Freedom	15	799	17	Won	
2023	House of Representatives	Party for Freedom	8	2,388	37	Won	
2025	House of Representatives	Party for Freedom	11	977	26	Won	
