= Sander Terphuis =

Dutch-Iranian politician and jurist

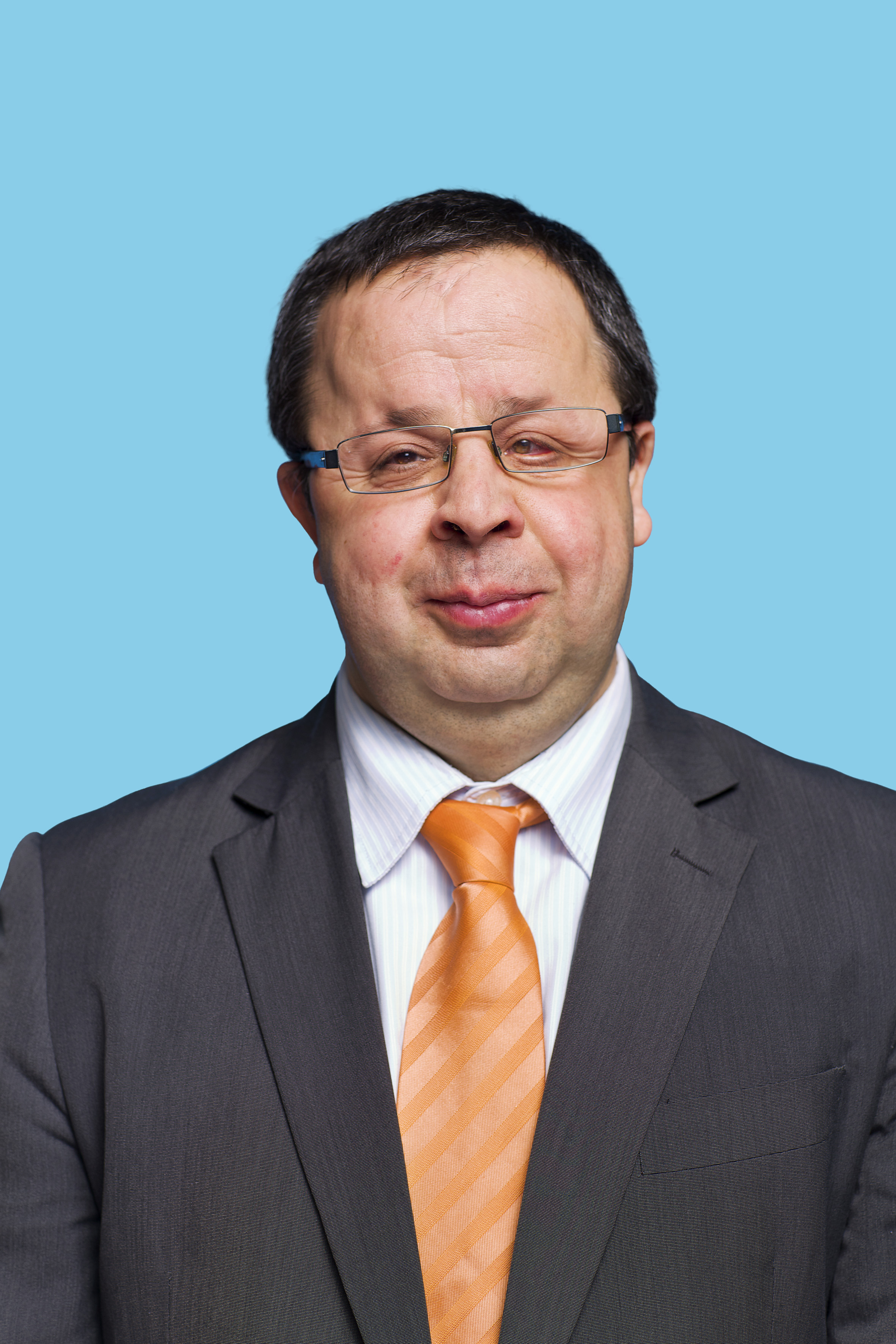
- Born: Ahmad Queleich Khany; 1972 (age 53–54); Teheran, Iran
- Education: Utrecht University
- Occupations: lawyer and Writer
- Political party: PvdA

Sander Terphuis (born Ahmad Queleich Khany, Persian: احمد قلیچ‌خانی) is an Iranian-Dutch lawyer who is half blind. He emigrated from Iran to the Netherlands at the age of eighteen, and began to study law there. Afterwards he entered the world of politics and his name became famous in the Netherlands during a campaign that opposed the criminalization of illegal immigrants.

== Career ==
He was also the national chair of the Dutch Association of the Blind and Visually Impaired (NVBS) and vice-chairman of Viziris, an organization for the protection of the blind and visually impaired. For the 2010 parliamentary elections he was 53rd on the candidate list of the PvdA. In 2013, he played an important role in the discussion about the criminalization of illegal immigrants, which the Rutte II government wanted to introduce. In 2014 he was on the list of candidates for the European Parliament elections. Since 2011 he writes for Joop.nl.

== Bibliography ==
- 2015: The Wrestler (autobiography), ed. Prometheus (publisher), Bert Bakker, Amsterdam, 2015, ISBN 9789035142886
