= Raymond de Roon =

Dutch politician and prosecutor

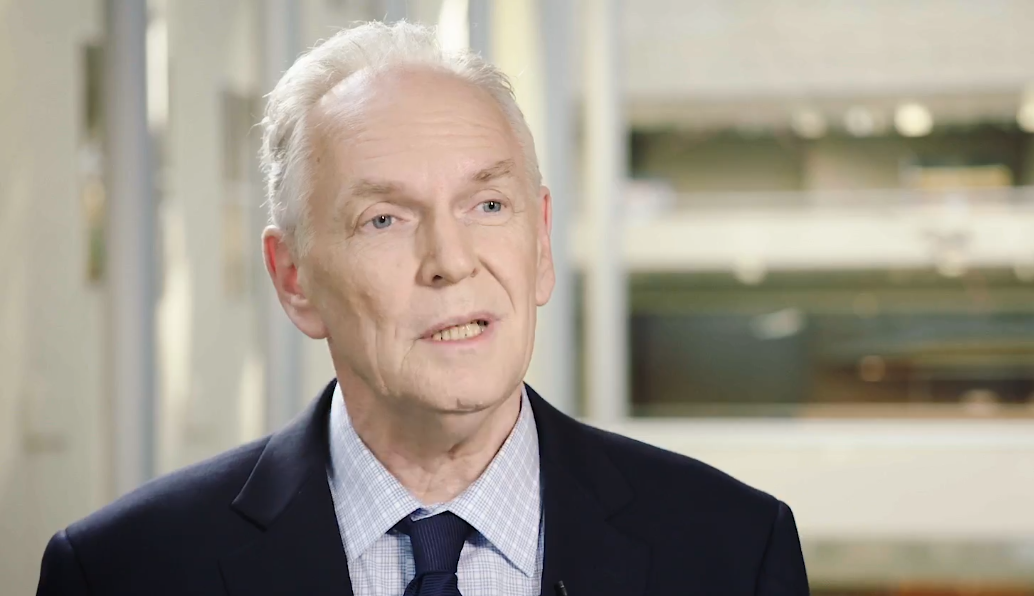

Member of the House of Representatives
- Incumbent
- Assumed office 30 November 2006

Personal details
- Born: 1 September 1952 (age 74) Amsterdam, Netherlands
- Party: Party for Freedom (2006–present)
- Spouse: Married (m. 1996)
- Children: 2
- Education: Leiden University (LL.M.)
- Occupation: Politician, prosecutor

Raymond de Roon (born 1 September 1952) is a Dutch politician and former prosecutor. As a member of the Party for Freedom (Partij voor de Vrijheid) he has been an MP since 30 November 2006. He was focused on matters of foreign policy, military operations and the European Union, and his specialities were changed solely to foreign policy after the 2023 general election.

== Biography ==
De Roon studied law at Vrije Universiteit Amsterdam and Leiden University. Afterwards, he was employed by the Ministry of Foreign Affairs. In 1983, he was a deputy prosecutor in Leeuwarden. Later, he operated as a prosecutor in The Hague, the Netherlands Antilles, and Zutphen. His last job before his election to the House was as advocate general at the Amsterdam court.

De Roon currently lives in Almere, and is also a member of the municipal council there. He was the local lead candidate for his party. The PVV went on to become the biggest party in Almere, with 21.6% of the vote and 9 seats in the council.

== Electoral history ==
Electoral history of Raymond de Roon
Year	Body	Party	Pos.	Votes	Result		Ref.
Year	Body	Party	Pos.	Votes	Party seats	Individual	Ref.
2006	House of Representatives	Party for Freedom	3	448	9	Won	
2010	House of Representatives	Party for Freedom	4	1,640	24	Won	
2012	House of Representatives	Party for Freedom	14	347	15	Won	
2017	House of Representatives	Party for Freedom	13	269	20	Won	
2021	House of Representatives	Party for Freedom	17	520	17	Won	
2023	House of Representatives	Party for Freedom	16	477	37	Won	
2025	House of Representatives	Party for Freedom	22	280	26	Won	
