= Pieter van Woensel (politician) =

Dutch politician

Pieter Theodoor van Woensel
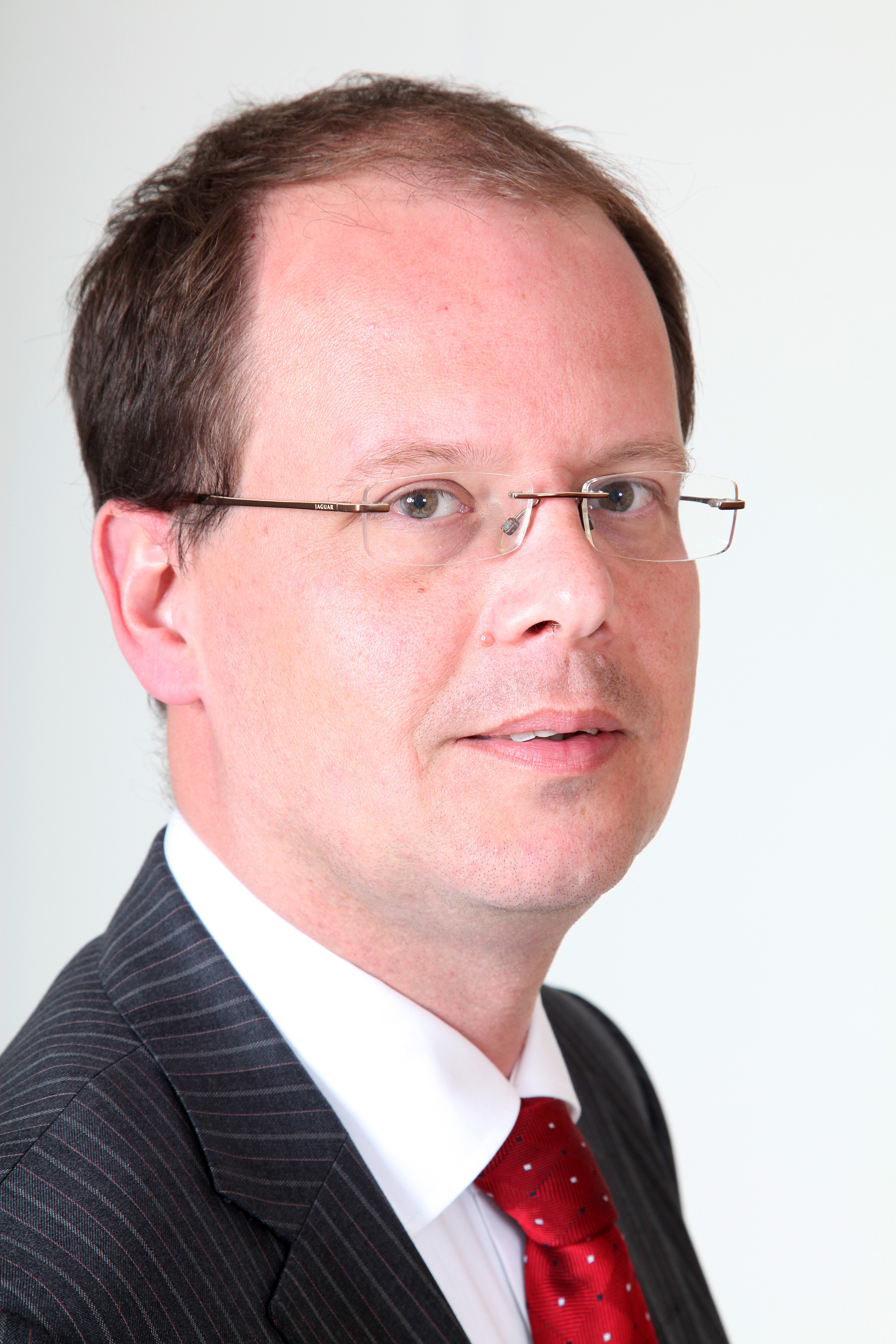
- Born: 15 September 1970 (age 55); Breda, Netherlands
- Occupation: Politician

Pieter Theodoor van Woensel (born 15 September 1970 in Breda, Netherlands) is a politician and former Wethouder (alderman) in the Netherlands.

== Early career ==
He followed the HBO course in training-authorities management at the Thorbecke Academy in Leeuwarden between 1990 and 1994. He studied legal administration at the state University of Groningen. In Groningen he became involved with the foundation of a new regional political party that would stand up for the interests of students, Student en Stad. In the 1994 elections, this party won one seat in the Groningen municipal council. Pieter van Woensel becomes the first half-assistant to the party's first councillor, Marcel Beukeboom. After two years, as agreed beforehand, he followed Beukeboom as city councillor for a period of two years.

== The Hague ==
In 1998, van Woensel was elected to the Association of Netherlands Municipalities (VNG). Van Woensel became an active member of the local People's Party for Freedom and Democracy (VVD). In 2002, he was elected for the VVD to the Hague municipal council, and a year later became its Fractievoorzitter (parliamentary leader). In 2004, van Woensel became Bas Verkerk's successor on his departure, taking over the economic affairs and employment portfolio. In April 2006, he was given the transport, business, suburbs, and environment portfolio. At the beginning of 2007 it was revealed that, under him, the construction of RandstadRail - with its budget of €12 million - had actually cost €451 million. He took political flak for this error and resigned his aldermanship in February 2007.
