= Harm Beertema =

Dutch politician and former educator

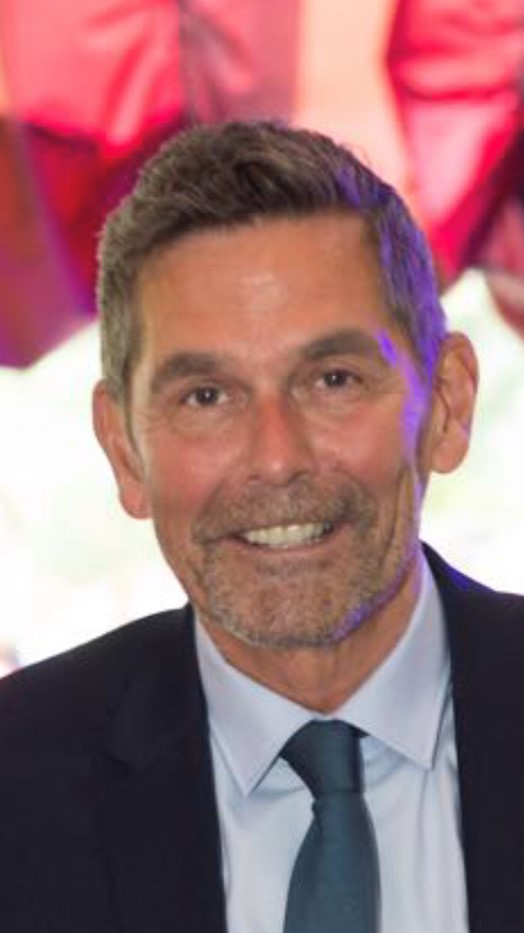
- Beertema (2019)

Member of the House of Representatives
- In office 17 June 2010 – 5 December 2023

Member of the States of South Holland
- In office 17 March 2011 – 15 July 2011

Personal details
- Born: Harm Jan Beertema; 9 March 1952 (age 74) Zaandam, Netherlands
- Party: Belang van Nederland (2024–present)
- Other political affiliations: Farmer–Citizen Movement (2023–2024); Party for Freedom (until 2023)

Harm Jan Beertema (born 9 March 1952) is a Dutch politician and former educator. He has been a member of the House of Representatives for the Party for Freedom since 17 June 2010. He focuses on matters of primary, special, secondary and vocational education as well as teachers policy. He was a member of the States of South Holland from 17 March 2011 until 15 July 2011.

== Retirement from House of Representatives ==
Beertema did not stand in the Dutch general election of November 2023. He had been placed 16th on the list of Party for Freedom candidates, and considered this too low given his experience in the party, and turned the option down. The day before the elections, Beertema announced on X that he had become a member of the Farmer–Citizen Movement and that he would vote for Caroline van der Plas. During the coalition forming process, he questioned the ability of his former party to govern, given its representatives' lack of experience.

== Electoral history ==
Electoral history of Harm Beertema
Year	Body	Party	Pos.	Votes	Result		Ref.
Year	Body	Party	Pos.	Votes	Party seats	Individual	Ref.
2010	House of Representatives	Party for Freedom	20	235	24	Won	
2012	House of Representatives	Party for Freedom	10	433	15	Won	
2017	House of Representatives	Party for Freedom	10	515	20	Won	
2021	House of Representatives	Party for Freedom	16	456	17	Won	
2025	House of Representatives	BVNL	3	189	0	Lost	
