= Marieke van der Werf =

Dutch politician

Maria Catharina Ida (Marieke) van der Werf (born 8 November 1959 in Dordrecht) is a former Dutch politician. As a member of the Christian Democratic Appeal (Christen-Democratisch Appèl) she was an MP from 11 January 2011 to 19 September 2012. She focused on matters of sustainable development and cultural policy.

== Electoral history ==
Election	Party	Position	Votes	Refs
2002 Dutch municipal elections in Amsterdam	CDA	9	262	
2006 Dutch municipal elections in Amsterdam	CDA	3	931	
2010 Dutch municipal elections in Amsterdam	CDA	6	324	
2010 Dutch general election	CDA	32	452	
2012 Dutch general election	CDA	17	809	
2014 Dutch municipal elections in Amsterdam	CDA	26	26	
Water board election 2015 in Waterschap Amstel, Gooi en Vecht	CDA	15	641	
2019 Dutch provincial elections in North Holland	CDA	26	163	
