= Ad Koppejan =

Dutch politician

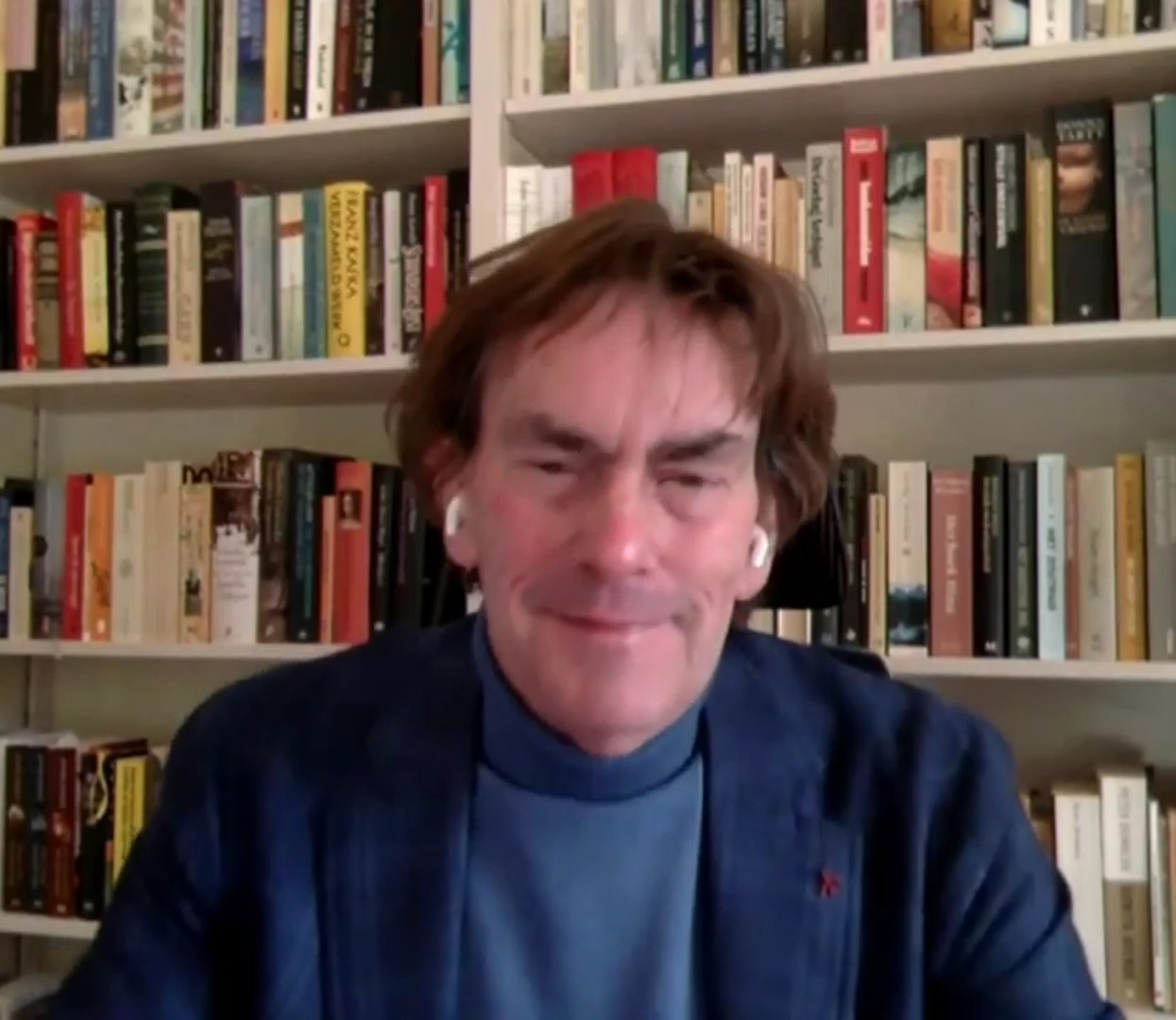

Member of the House of Representatives
- In office 30 November 2006 – 19 September 2012

Personal details
- Born: Adriaan Jacobus Koppejan; 2 October 1962 (age 63) Zoutelande, Netherlands
- Party: Christian Democratic Appeal
- Occupation: Politician

Adriaan Jacobus "Ad" Koppejan (born 2 October 1962, in Zoutelande) is a former Dutch politician. As a member of the Christian Democratic Appeal (Christen-Democratisch Appèl) he was an MP from 30 November 2006 to 19 September 2012. He focused on matters of fishery and water policy, administrative burden and corporate social responsibility.

Koppejan is a member of the Protestant Church in the Netherlands (PKN).
