= Manja Smits =

Dutch politician

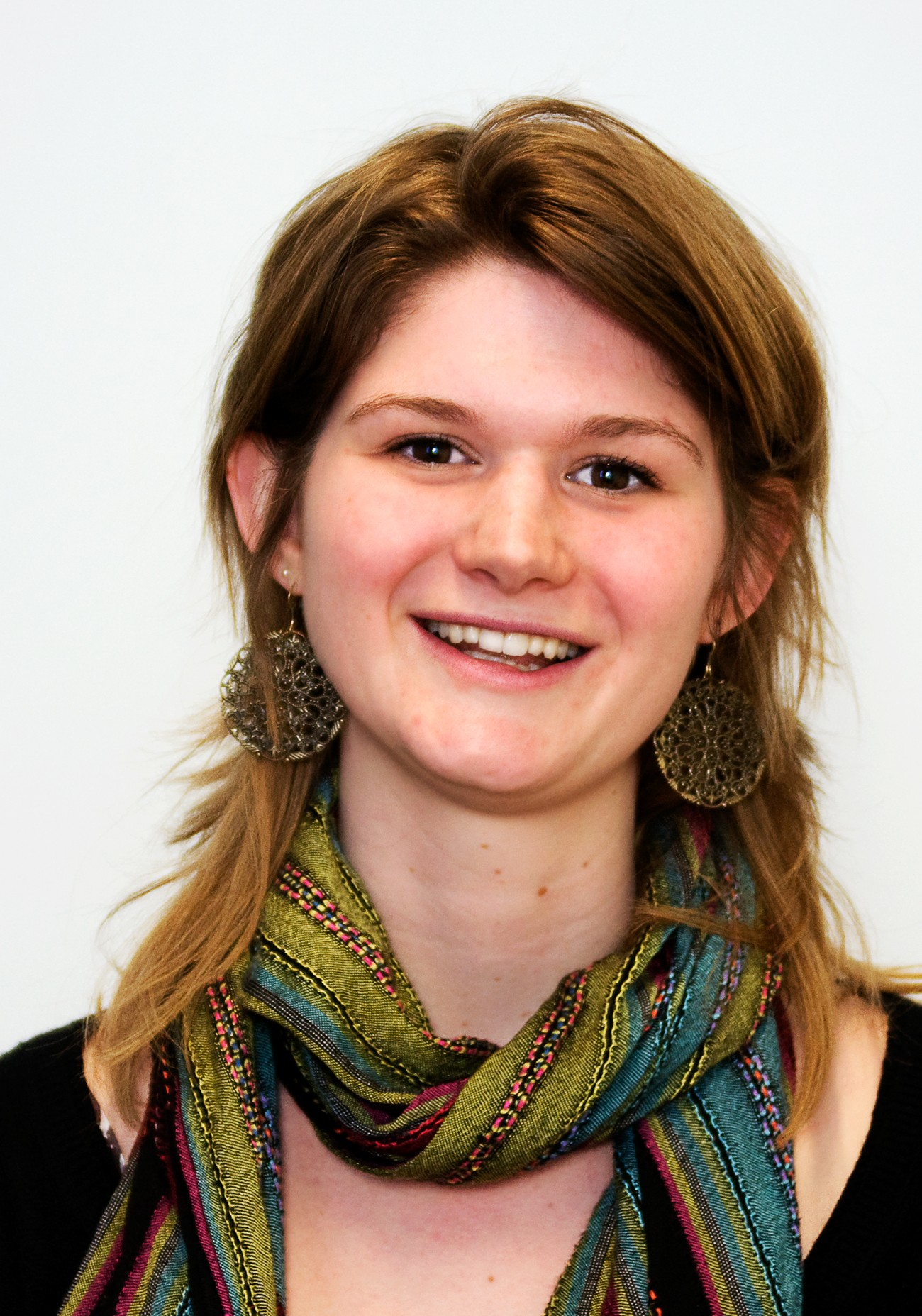
- Manja Smits

Member of the House of Representatives
- In office 22 April 2008 – 15 April 2014

Personal details
- Born: 27 May 1985 (age 41) De Bilt
- Party: Socialist Party
- Occupation: Politician

Manja Smits (born 27 May 1985 in De Bilt) is a Dutch politician. She was an MP for the Socialist Party (Socialistische Partij) from 22 April 2008 until 15 April 2014, specializing in matters of primary and secondary education. From May 2013 onward, she was replaced by Eric Smaling. Since 2007 she has also been an SP's party executive.

Smits stayed for a half a year in Bolivia, where she worked in an orphanage. Afterwards she studied history at the University of Groningen. During her study she presided both the Groningen section of SP's youth organization ROOD and thereafter the SP Groningen section.
