= Esmé Wiegman =

Dutch politician

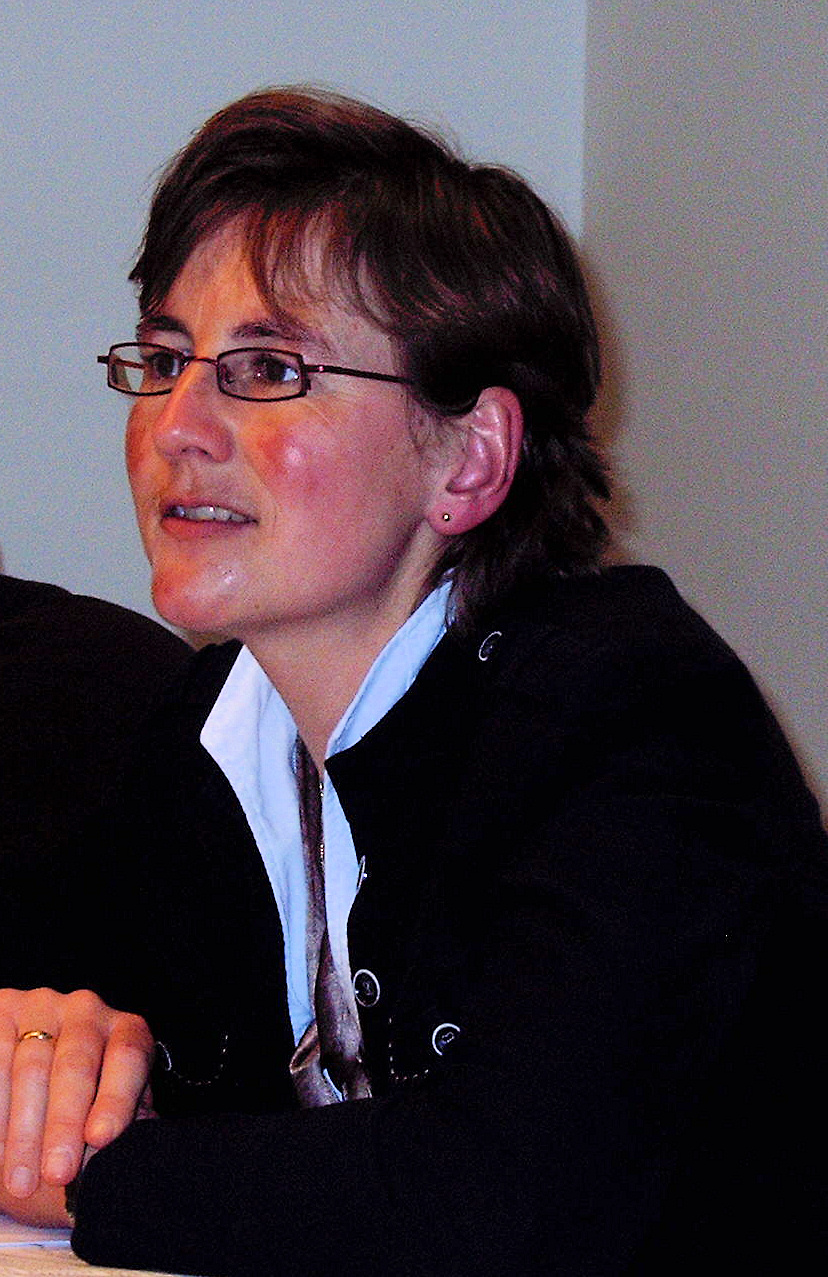

Member of the House of Representatives (Netherlands)
- In office 1 March 2007 – 19 September 2012

Personal details
- Born: Emma Eleonora van Meppelen Scheppink; 24 July 1975 (age 51) Haarlem, Netherlands
- Party: ChristianUnion (ChristenUnie - CU); Reformatory Political Federation (RPF) till 2004
- Spouse: Married
- Education: Leiden University (MA, Dutch language and literature)
- Occupation: Politician

Emma Eleonora (Esmé) Wiegman-van Meppelen Scheppink (born 24 July 1975 in Haarlem) is a former Dutch politician. As a member of the ChristianUnion (ChristenUnie) she was an MP from 1 March 2007 to 19 September 2012. She focused on matters of the European Union, public health, welfare, sports, spatial planning and natural environment.

== Biography ==
=== Education and activities ===
Wiegman studied Dutch language and Dutch literature with a specialization in modern Dutch and Dutch East Indies literature at Leiden University. After finishing her study she worked as an editor for publishers and a magazine.

Wiegman became an active member of the youth organisation of the Reformatory Political Federation (RPF) in 1989, later she became a board member of the RPF itself. After the RPF merged into the ChristianUnion in 2002, Wiegman was elected a local representative in the council of her hometown Zwolle.

=== Political career ===
In the 2007 national elections she was elected first runner-up for the lower house of Netherlands' Parliament. After the ChristianUnion became a participant in the newly formed fourth Balkenende cabinet - and two representatives taking positions in that cabinet - Wiegman became a member of Parliament in March 2007. Her term ended in September 2012.

=== After politics ===
She found a new position with the National General Practitioners Association (LHV) as regional manager for the North (Friesland, Groningen, Drenthe, Zwolle/Flevoland). On February 1, 2014, she became director of the Dutch Patients Association. She left that position on March 1, 2018, to become the director of the Cooperative Palliative Care Netherlands.

=== Personal life ===
Esmé Wiegman is married, mother of three and a member of the Protestant Church in the Netherlands.
