= Lutz Jacobi =

Dutch politician and civil servant

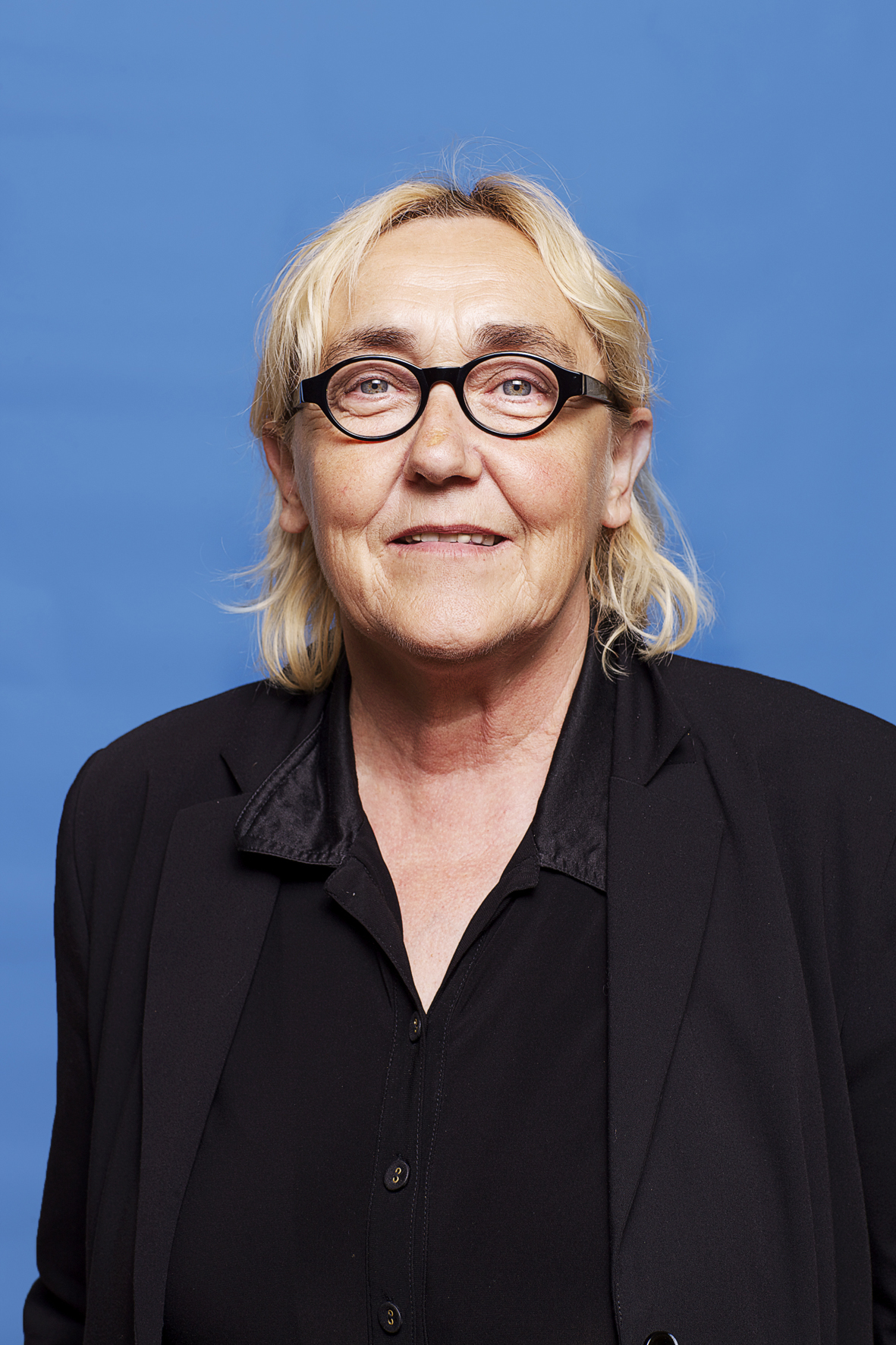
- Lutz Jacobi

Member of the House of Representatives
- In office 30 November 2006 – 23 March 2017

Personal details
- Born: 13 December 1955 (age 70) Katlijk
- Party: Labour Party (until 2025)
- Occupation: Politician

Lutske (Lutz) Jacobi (born December 13, 1955, in Katlijk) is a Dutch politician and former civil servant. As a member of the Labour Party (Partij van de Arbeid) she was an MP between November 30, 2006, and March 23, 2017. She focused on matters of natural environment, rural area, agriculture, horticulture, fishery, recreation and the Wadden Sea.
