= Erik Ziengs =

Dutch politician and former entrepreneur

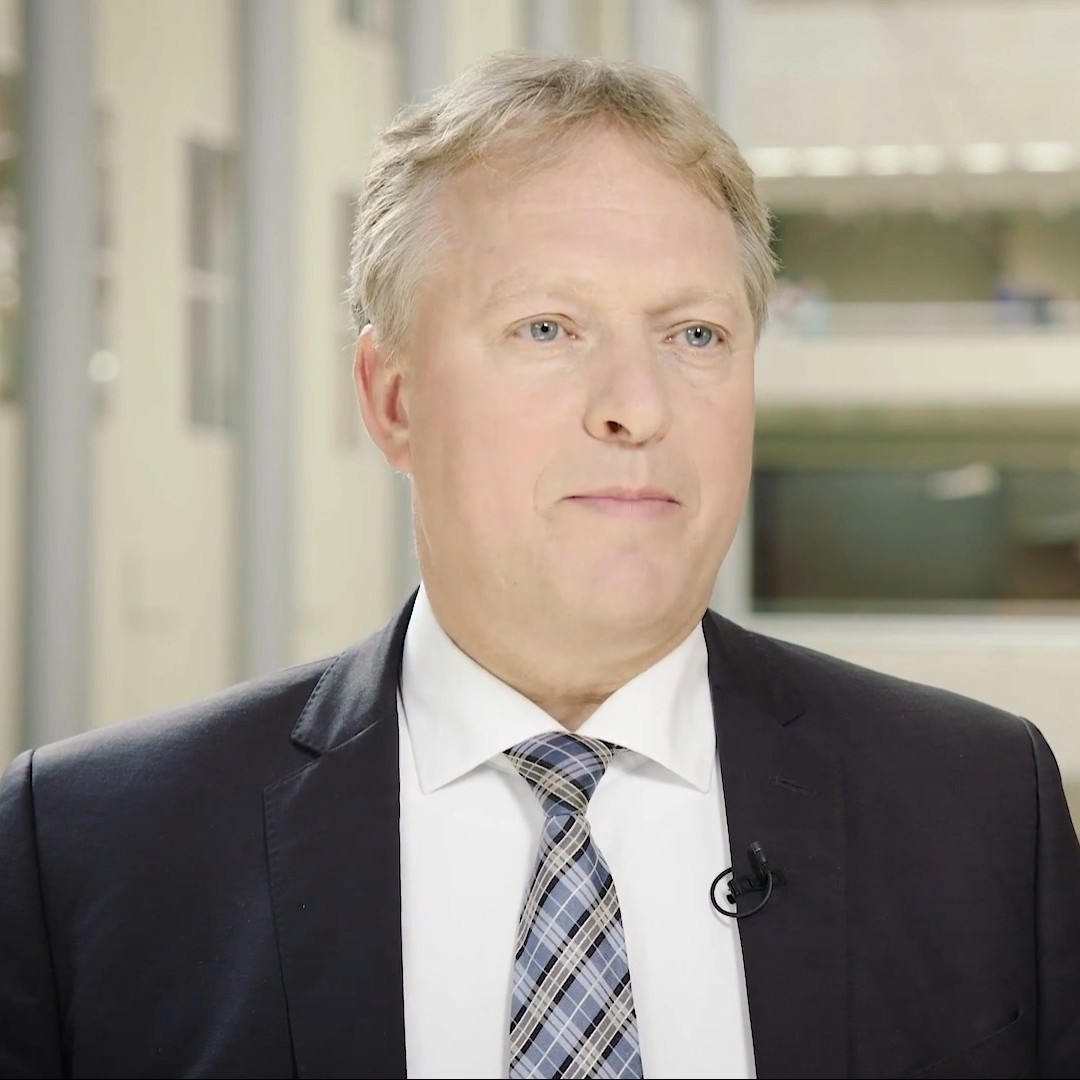

Member of the House of Representatives
- Incumbent
- Assumed office 17 June 2010

Personal details
- Born: 27 September 1960 (age 65) Hoogersmilde
- Party: People's Party for Freedom and Democracy
- Occupation: Politician

Erik Ziengs (born 27 September 1960 in Hoogersmilde) is a Dutch politician and former entrepreneur. As a member of the People's Party for Freedom and Democracy (Volkspartij voor Vrijheid en Democratie) he has been an MP since 17 June 2010. He focuses on the matters of SME's, tourism, entrepreneurship and reduction of administrative burdens.
