= Wassila Hachchi =

Dutch politician, civil servant and officer

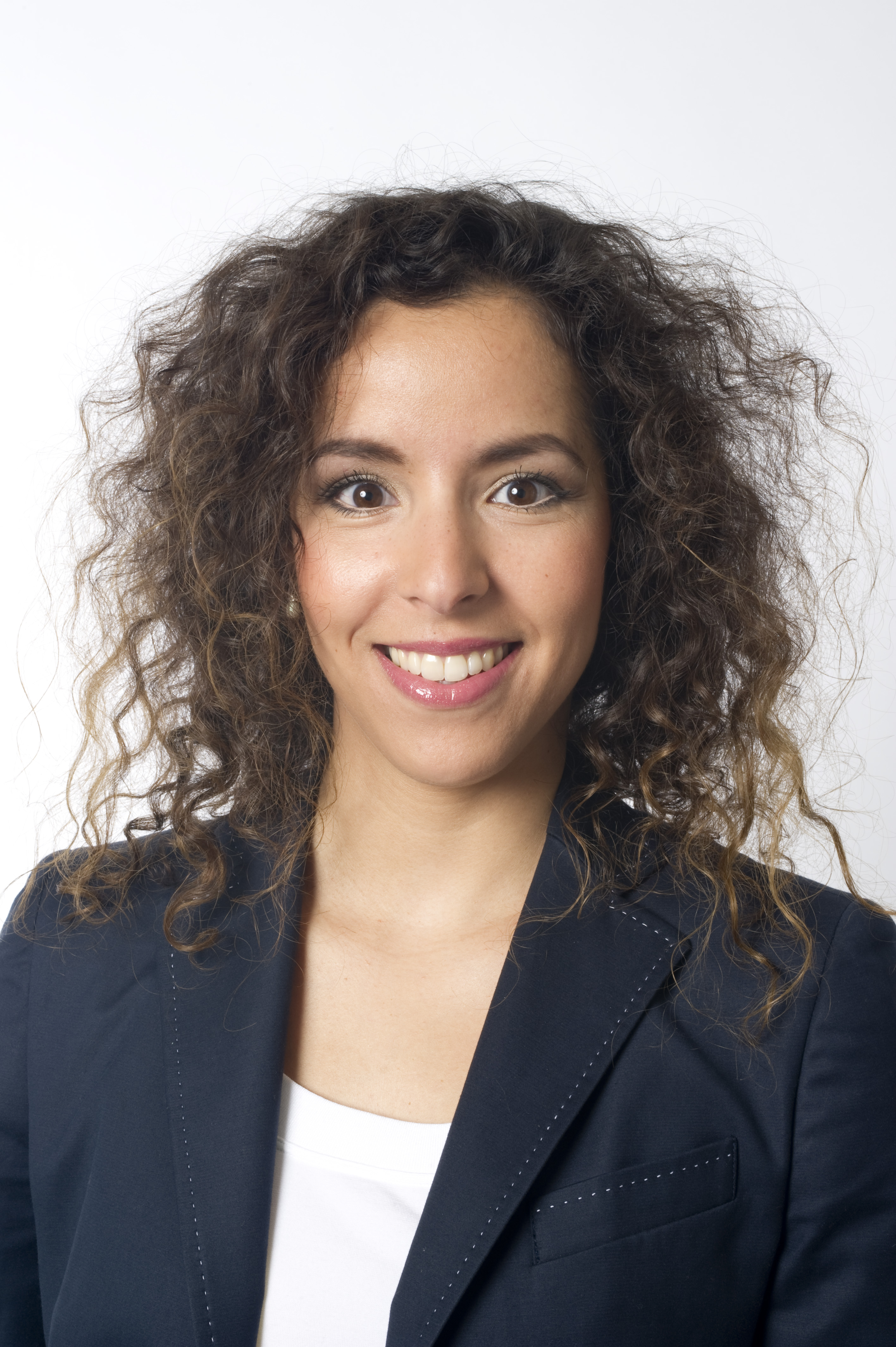
- Wassila Hachchi in 2010
- Born: 6 January 1980 (age 46); Rotterdam, Netherlands
- Occupations: Social entrepreneur - speaker, coach and campaign consultant
- Years active: 2010–2016

Wassila Hachchi (born 6 January 1980) is a Dutch former politician and former civil servant and Royal Netherlands Navy officer. As a member of Democrats 66 (D66) she was an MP from 17 June 2010 until 19 January 2016. She focused on matters of defense, development aid and Kingdom relations.

== Early life and education ==
Wassila Hachchi was born on 6 January 1980 in Rotterdam, Netherlands. She is of Moroccan descent and grew up in Breda.

Hachchi has a degree in business administration from the Erasmus University Rotterdam and was educated at the Royal Netherlands Naval College. She was commissioned in the Royal Netherlands Navy as a logistical officer from 2003 to 2007.

== Career ==
Hachchi worked as a civil servant at the Ministry of Economic Affairs and as the head of the Planning and Control department in the Catering Service of the Armed Service Support Command (Commando Dienstencentra) of the Ministry of Defence for several years. On 17 June 2010, Hachchi was sworn in as a Liberal-Democrat member of the Dutch Parliament.

In May 2015, Hachchi gave a TED talk at TEDx Amsterdam Women regarding social media and politics. In June 2015, Hachchi advised that all pilots undergo mandatory psychological testing.

On 20 January 2016 Hachchi claimed to have left the House of Representatives to join the Hillary Clinton presidential campaign, 2016. Her sudden leave from the House and lack of communication caused some commotion. She was succeeded in the House by Salima Belhaj. In April 2016, she declared she renounced her D66 membership.

== Publication ==
- Wassila Hachchi: Listen. Think. Speak. 28 pag. E-book (Kindle). Publisher: Motivatingthemasses.com, 2016. ASIN B01NCI87ID
