= Cynthia Ortega =

Dutch politician

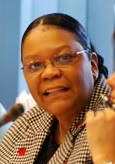

Member of the House of Representatives (Netherlands)
- In office 30 November 2006 – 19 September 2012

Personal details
- Born: Cynthia Apolonia Martijn; 9 February 1956 (age 70) Willemstad, Curaçao
- Party: ChristianUnion (ChristenUnie - CU)
- Spouse: Married
- Education: ? (BSc, Labour market and Human resource policies), Open University in the Netherlands (MSc, Human resource management)
- Occupation: Politician, civil servant
- Website: (in Dutch) ChristianUnion website

Cynthia Apolonia Ortega-Martijn (born 9 February 1956 in Willemstad, Curaçao) is a former Dutch politician. As a member of the ChristianUnion (ChristenUnie) she was an MP from 30 November 2006 to 19 September 2012. She focused on matters of economical affairs, social affairs, employment, integration, housing and Netherlands Antilles affairs.

Ortega obtained a bachelor's degree in labour market policies and human resource policies. At the Open University in the Netherlands she obtained a master's degree in human resource management.
