= Ingrid de Caluwé =

Dutch politician (born 1967)

Member of the House of Representatives
- In office 1 June 2011 – 23 March 2017

Personal details
- Born: Ingrid Saskia Helena de Caluwé; 27 May 1967 (age 59) Luxembourg City, Luxembourg
- Party: People's Party for Freedom and Democracy
- Occupation: Politician

Ingrid de Caluwé (born 27 May 1967) is a Dutch politician. As a member of the People's Party for Freedom and Democracy (Volkspartij voor Vrijheid en Democratie) she was a member of the House of Representatives between 1 June 2011 and 23 March 2017, not seeking reelection during the general election, 2017. She focused on matters of development aid, aviation, harbors and ship transport. De Caluwé studied law at Leiden University.
