= Jhim van Bemmel =

Dutch politician (born 1959)

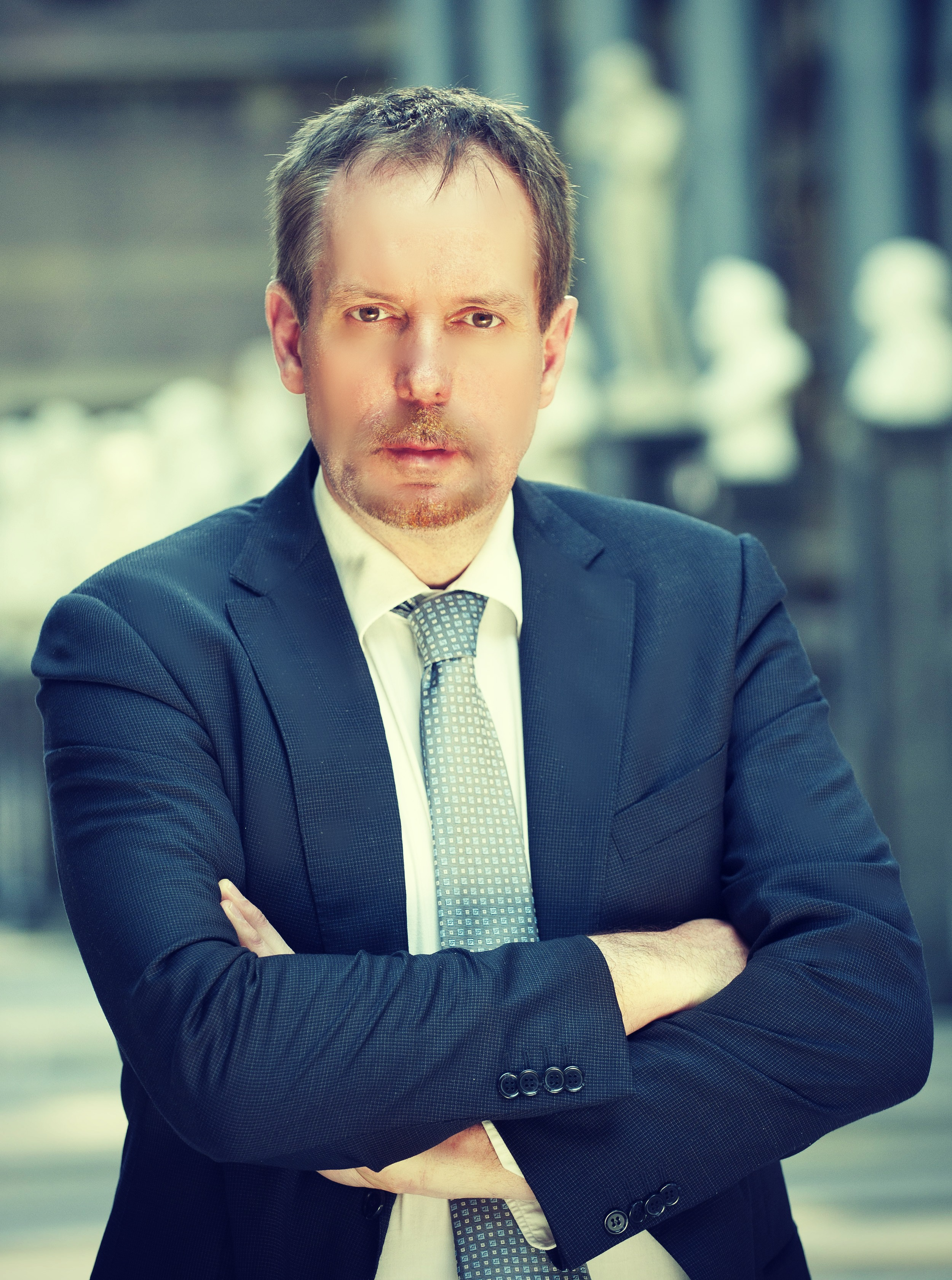
Jhim van Bemmel

Jhim Jan Gerardus van Bemmel (born 15 November 1959 in Boskoop) is a former Dutch politician. As a member of the Party for Freedom (Partij voor de Vrijheid) he was an MP from 17 June 2010 to 19 September 2012. Since 6 July 2012 he was an independent politician. He focused on matters of spatial planning, consumers, tourism, telecom, postal market, administrative burden and environmental law.
