= Paul Ulenbelt =

Dutch politician, trade unionist and academic (1952–2025)

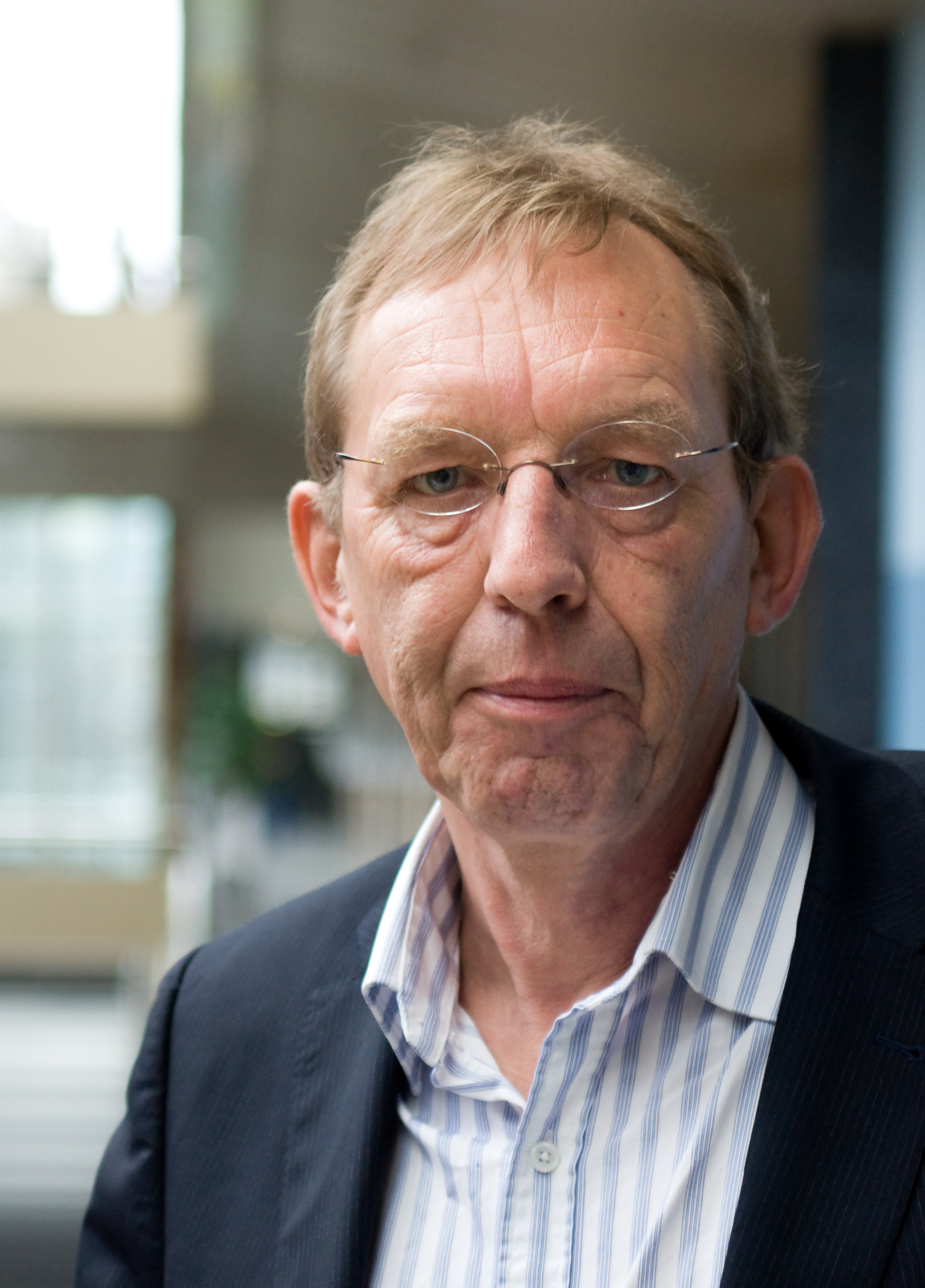
- Ulenbelt in 2009

Member of the House of Representatives
- In office 30 November 2006 – 23 March 2017

Personal details
- Born: 1 April 1952 Haaksbergen, Netherlands
- Died: 21 July 2025 (aged 73) Leiden, Netherlands
- Party: Socialist Party
- Occupation: Politician

Paul Ulenbelt (1 April 1952 – 21 July 2025) was a Dutch politician, trade unionist and academic. As a member of the Socialist Party, he was a member of Dutch House of Representatives between 2006 and 2017. He focused on matters of pensions, income and employment.

== Life and career ==
Ulenbelt was born on 1 April 1952. He studied industrial and organizational psychology at the University of Groningen and got promoted in medicine at the University of Amsterdam.

Ulenbelt died on 21 July 2025, at the age of 73.
