= James Sharpe (Dutch politician) =

Dutch politician (born 1962)

James Emanuel Johan Willem Sharpe (born 9 November 1962 in Eindhoven) is a Dutch former politician, businessman and athlete of Aruban descent. As a member of the Party for Freedom (Partij voor de Vrijheid) he was an MP from 17 June till 19 November 2010. He focused on matters of sports, infrastructure and big projects, and was succeeded by Ino van den Besselaar. He resigned his seat in the Dutch parliament after it came out that he was in charge of the Hungarian telecom company Digitania when it received a record fine in 2008 for misleading customers.

Sharpe studied financial economics at Tilburg University, participated in hurdling competitions, among others, for the Netherlands Antilles at the 1992 Summer Olympics, and performed several management jobs in telecommunications.

He has been married twice and lives in the Romanian municipality of Sângeorgiu de Mureș.
