= Michiel Holtackers =

Dutch politician

Member of the House of Representatives of the Netherlands
- In office 30 June 2011 – 19 September 2012
- Preceded by: Gerda Verburg

Personal details
- Born: Michiel Pieter Maria Holtackers; 19 October 1956 (age 69) Arnhem, Netherlands
- Party: Christian Democratic Appeal (Christen-Democratisch Appèl - CDA)
- Education: Police Academy of the Netherlands (BA); Catholic University of Leuven (MSc, Criminology)
- Occupation: Politician, police officer, trade union leader
- Website: (in Dutch) Christian Democratic Appeal website

Michiel Pieter Maria Holtackers (born 19 October 1956 in Arnhem) is a former Dutch politician and police officer as well as trade union leader. As a member of the Christian Democratic Appeal (Christen-Democratisch Appèl) he was an MP from 30 June 2011 to 19 September 2012, succeeding Gerda Verburg. He focused on matters of spatial planning, water management and Defense personnel.

Holtackers studied at the Police Academy of the Netherlands in Apeldoorn and criminology at the Belgian Catholic University of Leuven. From 1976 to 2011 he worked in the Dutch law enforcement; his last position was that of chief of the department of international police education of the Dutch Police Academy. From 1997 to 2006 he was also chairman of the Dutch association of middle and higher level police officers.

Holtackers is a member of the Roman Catholic Church.
