= René Leegte =

Dutch politician and businessman

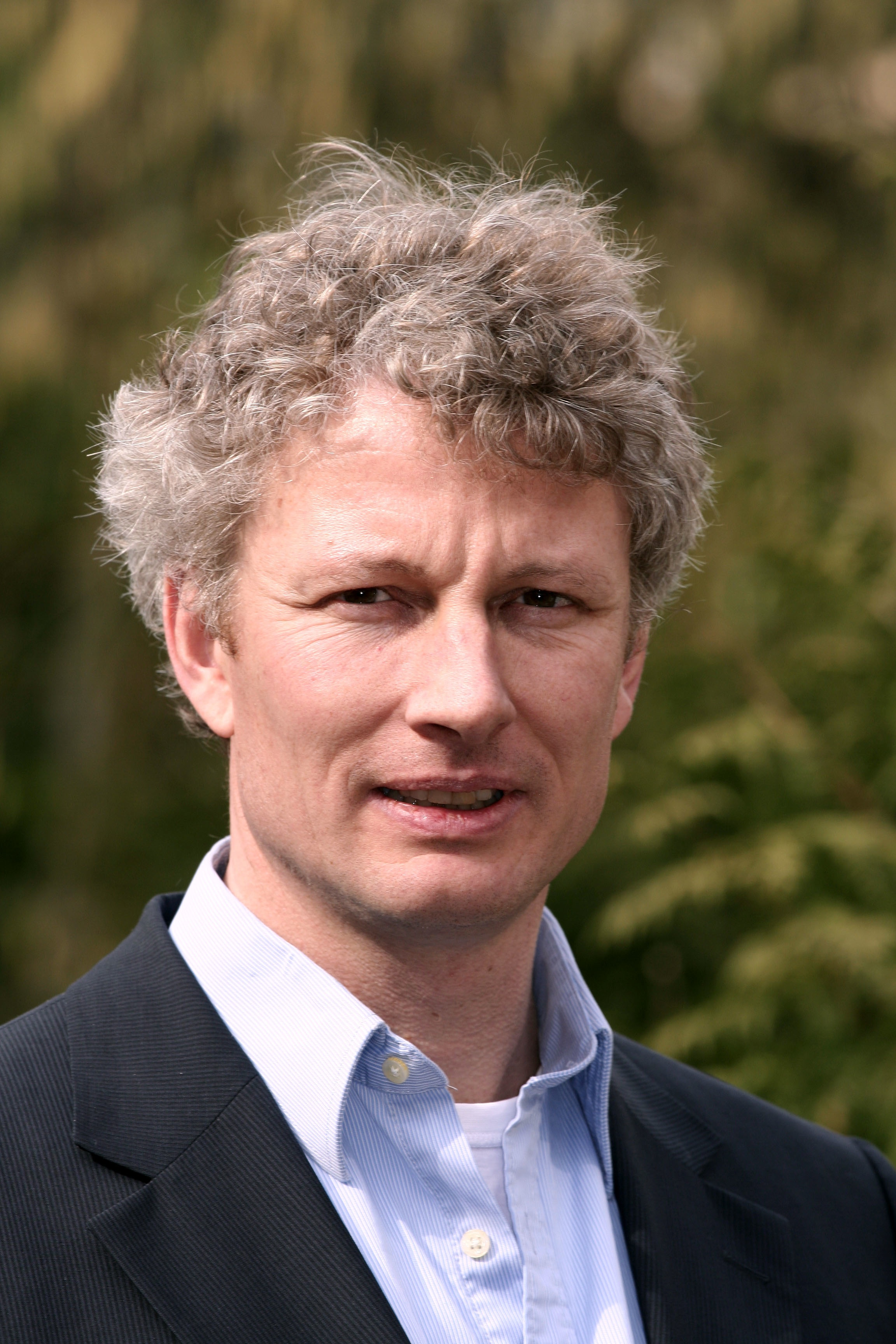
René Leegte

René Willums Leegte (born 8 July 1968, in The Hague) is a Dutch politician and former businessman. As a member of the People's Party for Freedom and Democracy he was a member of the House of Representatives of the Netherlands between 26 October 2010 and 24 March 2015. He focused on matters of natural environment, sustainable development and energy.

In January 2015 Leegte laid down his party spokesmanship for gas winning in Groningen and earthquakes in the region. He did so after having a conversation on the topic and party strategy on it being overheard during a train ride.

Leegte resigned as member of the House of Representatives on 24 March 2015 after having had an additional paid job for over a year at an organisation which was subjected to his parliamentary portfolio. Leegte did not enter the job in the register, nor report the earnings; he also used his parliamentary email address for the additional job. Leegte felt this conflicted with the integrity rules of the People's Party for Freedom and Democracy and thus resigned.
