= Karen Gerbrands =

Dutch politician (born 1967)

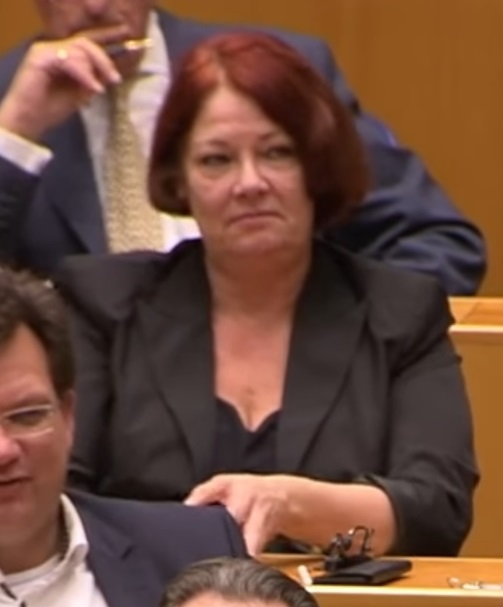

Member of the House of Representatives
- In office 23 March 2017 – 12 December 2018
- In office 13 January 2015 – 5 May 2015
- In office 17 June 2010 – 12 September 2012

Member of the municipal council of The Hague
- In office 27 March 2014 – 16 March 2022
- In office 11 March 2010 – 17 June 2010

Personal details
- Born: 29 August 1967 (age 58) The Hague, Netherlands
- Party: Party for Freedom (2009–2022)
- Occupation: Politician, nurse

Karen Gerbrands (Dutch pronunciation: [ˈkaːrə(ŋ) ˈɣɛrbrɑnts]; born 29 August 1967) is a Dutch politician and former nurse. Representing the Party for Freedom, she has been a member of municipal council of The Hague since 27 March 2014 and was a member of the House of Representatives between 23 March 2017 and 12 December 2018.

== Early life and career ==
Karen Gerbrands was born on 29 August 1967 in The Hague.

She worked as a nurse in hospitals, home care, prison, and nursing homes.

== Politics ==
Gerbrands was a political aid for the Party for Freedom in the House of Representatives from 2009 to June 2010.

Representing the Party for Freedom, she was a member of the municipal council of The Hague from 11 March 2010 to 17 June 2010 and a member of the House of Representatives from 17 June 2010 to 19 September 2012, where she focused on matters of health care policy and food safety.

She has been a member of municipal council of The Hague again since 27 March 2014. She temporarily was a member of the House of Representatives from 13 January 2015 to 5 May 2015, when she replaced Fleur Agema who was on pregnancy leave. She has been a member of the House of Representatives again since 23 March 2017.

== Personal life ==
Gerbrands lives in The Hague.
