= Tjeerd van Dekken =

Dutch politician (born 1967)

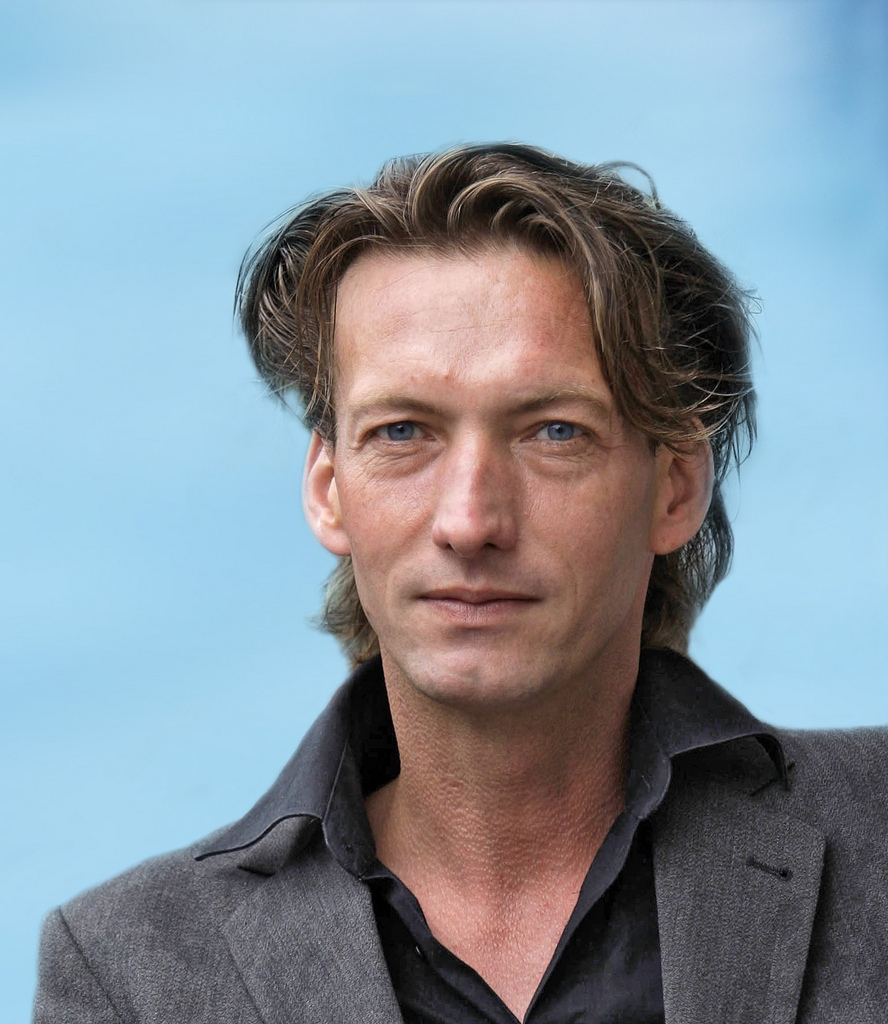
- Tjeerd van Dekken in 2010

Member of the House of Representatives
- In office 17 June 2010 – 23 March 2017

Personal details
- Born: Tjeerd Rienk van Dekken; 14 May 1967 (age 58) Marum, Netherlands
- Party: Labour Party

Tjeerd Rienk van Dekken (born 14 May 1967) is a Dutch politician and former communication employee. As a member of the Labour Party (Partij van de Arbeid) he was an MP between 17 June 2010 and 23 March 2017. He focuses on matters of sports policy and decline of population in more rural regions.

From 1994 to 1998, he was chairman of the Young Socialists (Jonge Socialisten). Van Dekken performed several communication jobs. From 2006 to 2010, he had a communication firm of his own.
