= Marcial Hernandez =

Dutch politician

Member of the House of Representatives (Netherlands)
- In office 17 June 2010 – 19 September 2012

Personal details
- Born: Marcial Manrique Hernandez; 20 April 1974 (age 52) Zaanstad, Netherlands
- Party: Independent (from 2012)
- Other political affiliations: Party for Freedom (2010-2012)
- Education: Koninklijke Militaire Academie
- Occupation: Politician; Army Officer

Military service
- Allegiance: The Netherlands
- Branch/service: Royal Netherlands Army
- Years of service: 1998-2010 (Military reserve since 2010)
- Rank: Major
- Battles/wars: War on terror

Marcial Manrique Hernandez (born 20 April 1974) is a Dutch former army officer and former politician.

He became a member of the House of Representatives for the Party for Freedom (PVV) on 17 June 2010. As an MP, he focused on matters of the Dutch defense.

Hernandez announced on 3 July 2012, in the wake of a press conference by Geert Wilders, that he had just left the PVV due to internal struggles. He did so together with fellow MP Wim Kortenoeven. They formed the Kortenoeven/Hernandez Group, that was in Parliament until 19 September 2012 (after the general elections, in which they didn't take part).
