= Eric Lucassen =

Dutch politician, music educator, and sergeant

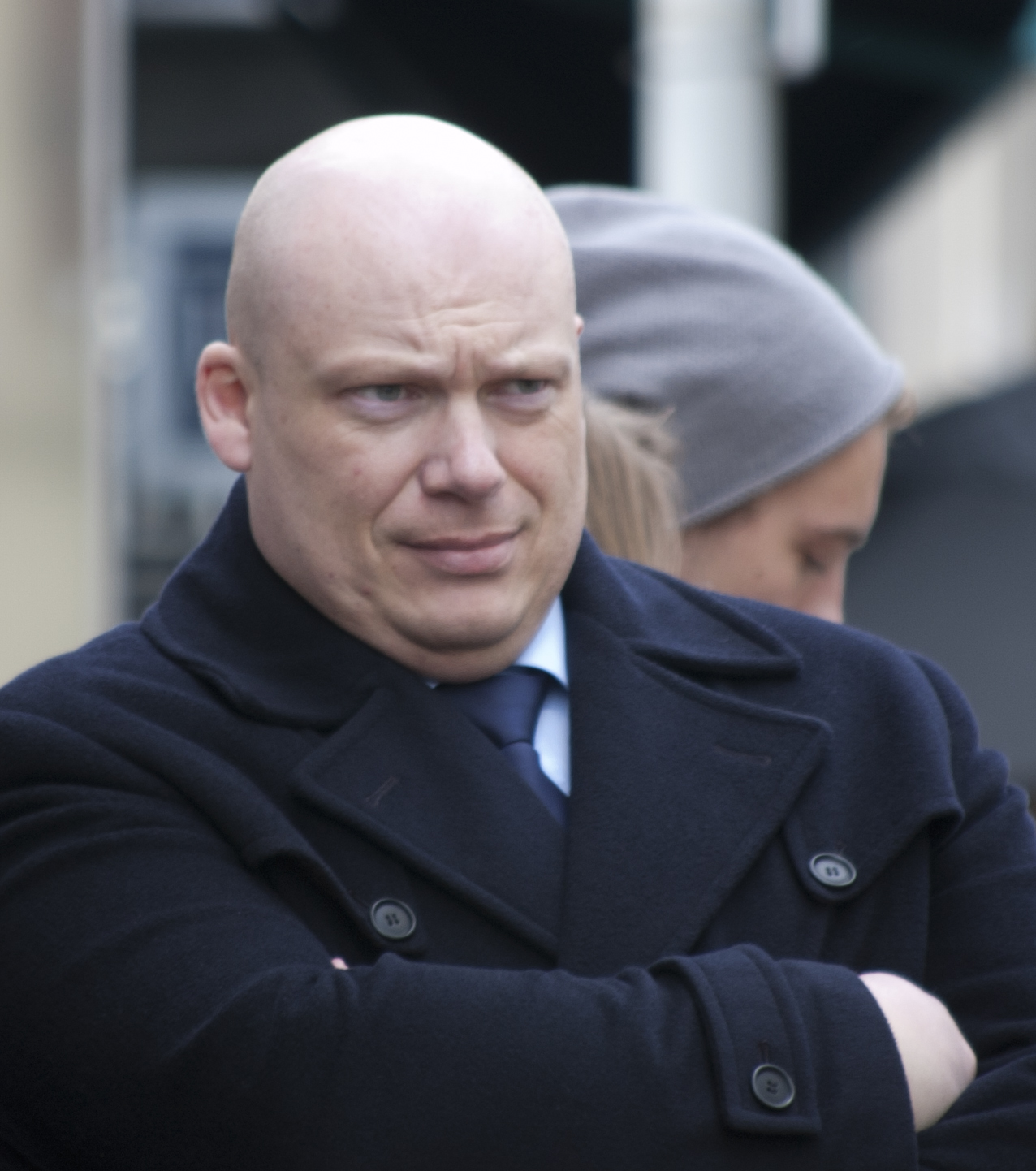

Member of the House of Representatives
- In office 17 June 2010 – 19 September 2012

Personal details
- Born: 2 November 1974 (age 50); Amsterdam, Netherlands
- Political party: Party for Freedom
- Occupation: Politician, digital music educator

Eric Lucassen (born 12 November 1974 in Amsterdam) is a former Dutch politician and digital music educator as well as sergeant. As a member of the Party for Freedom (Partij voor de Vrijheid) he was an MP from 17 June 2010 to 19 September 2012. He focused on matters of Kingdom relations.
