= Brigitte van der Burg =

Dutch politician (born 1961)

Member of the House of Representatives
- In office 30 November 2006 – 23 March 2017

Personal details
- Born: 7 April 1961 (age 65) Tanga, Tanzania
- Party: People's Party for Freedom and Democracy
- Occupation: Politician

Brigitte Ingrid van der Burg (born 7 April 1961 in Tanga, Tanzania) is a Dutch politician. As a member of the People's Party for Freedom and Democracy (Volkspartij voor Vrijheid en Democratie) she was an MP between 30 November 2006 and 23 March 2017. She focused on matters of the Dutch Royal House, local government finance, youth policy, organization of the Dutch government, consultancy and Kingdom relations.

Van der Burg studied human geography with a specialization in developing countries at Utrecht University.
