= Sabine Uitslag =

Dutch politician

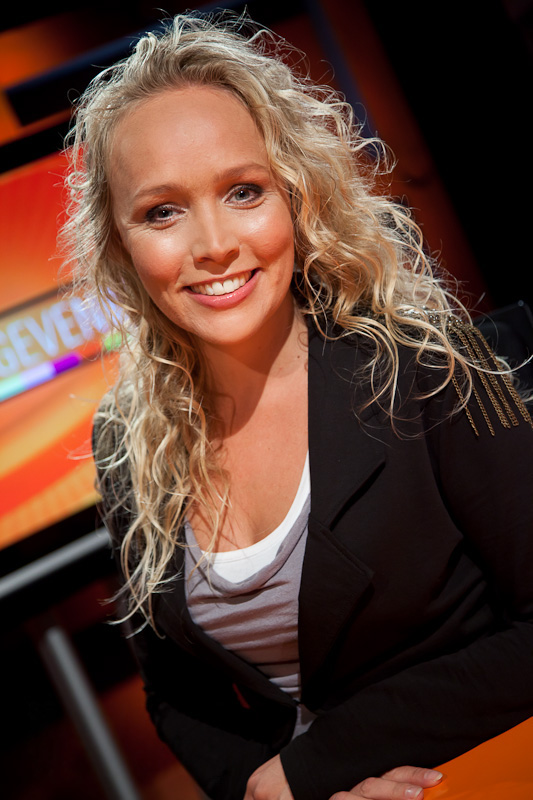

Member of the House of Representatives (Netherlands)
- In office 3 September 2008 – 19 September 2012
- In office 8 April 2008 – 29 July 2008

Personal details
- Born: Albertje Sabine Uitslag; 4 March 1973 (age 53) Westerhaar-Vriezenveensewijk, Netherlands
- Party: Christian Democratic Appeal (Christen-Democratisch Appèl - CDA)
- Education: Maastricht University (MA, Nursing)
- Occupation: Politician, educator, nurse, singer
- Website: (in Dutch) Christian Democratic Appeal website

Albertje Sabine Uitslag (born 4 March 1973 in Westerhaar-Vriezenveensewijk) is a former Dutch politician. As a member of the Christian Democratic Appeal (Christen-Democratisch Appèl) she was (again) an MP from 3 September 2008 to 19 September 2012. She focused on matters of social care, and addiction and youth policy.

Uitslag studied healthcare science with a specialization in nursing at Maastricht University.
