= Willie Dille =

Dutch politician

Wilhelmina Ruurdina Dille (2 June 1965 – 8 August 2018), commonly known as Willie Dille, was a Dutch politician.

== Career and politics ==
Dille achieved a bachelor's degree in youth work and worked for 25 years with disabled people in healthcare. On 11 March 2010 she was elected on behalf of the far right Party for Freedom (Partij voor de Vrijheid) as in the city council of The Hague - one of the few cities where the party participated in the elections.

On 17 June 2010, Dille was elected as member of parliament in the House of Representatives (Tweede Kamer) and she resigned from the city council. As a member of parliament, she was part of the coalition supporting the First Rutte cabinet. During her tenure, she focused on matters of services for the disabled, youth, adoption and casualties of war. In the September 2012 parliamentary elections, she was too low on the list to be re-elected. In May 2012, she returned as a member of the city council of The Hague, where she would remain a member until her death - after being re-elected in 2018, when Henk Bres initially received more votes than the higher placed Dille.

In February 2016, Dille shared a video on Facebook that suggested Islam was a bad influence and that the world would a be better place if Islam ceased to exist, resulting in criticism from other politicians, accusing her of hate propaganda.

In February 2018, the municipality of The Hague started an investigation into Dille's residence, as council members are obligated to live in the respective municipality. The investigation ended without definitive conclusion, but the mayor announced that new checks would be executed.

== Allegations of abduction and rape ==
On 6 August 2018, Dille published a video on Facebook where she announced her departure from the city council and showed desperation, blaming the mayor (Pauline Krikke) for starting the investigation into her residence, and city council member Arnoud van Doorn (former Party for Freedom, and now representing an Islamic party), whom she blamed for triggering the investigation. She didn't feel that she and her family were safe. She also accused him of organizing a group of Muslims to abduct, rape and abuse her, in order to shut her up. Van Doorn did not want to respond at the time, but considered filing legal charges.

The following day, a local TV station interviewed Dille, where she claimed that the video was an emotional impulse, and that she deleted the video because of her family. She confirmed the content of the video (but did not want to go into details), did repeat her accusations towards the mayor and indicated that she was repeatedly threatened by 'Moroccans'. Journalists were unable to verify her claims from either the video or the interview.

=== Suicide ===
On 8 August 2018, Dille died by suicide after apologizing to her loved ones on Facebook. She was 53, married and had four children, 1 adopted child, and provided a second home for approximately 12 disabled children.

After her death, the police and mayor said they had been in touch with Dille about the accusations, but never filed charges since she did not provide any further information on which an investigation could have been initiated.
