= Afke Schaart =

Dutch politician and manager

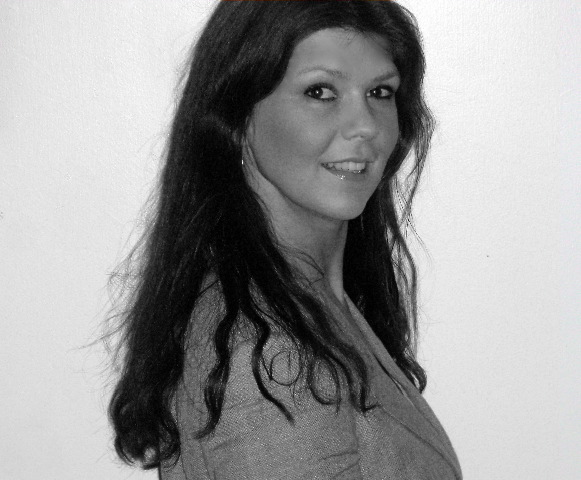

Member of the House of Representatives
- In office 17 June 2010 – 19 September 2012

Personal details
- Born: Afke Helprigdina Maria Schaart; 24 October 1973 (age 52) Zwartsluis, Netherlands
- Party: People's Party for Freedom and Democracy
- Education: University of Amsterdam
- Occupation: Politician and manager

Afke Helprigdina Maria Schaart (born 24 October 1973, Zwartsluis) is a former Dutch politician and manager. As a member of the People's Party for Freedom and Democracy (Volkspartij voor Vrijheid en Democratie) she was an MP from 17 June 2010 to 19 September 2012. She focused on matters of economic affairs (technology, innovation, export, regional and business location policy) and top incomes policy.

From 2008 to 2010 she was a member of the municipal council of Wassenaar.

Schaart studied political science with a specialization in international relations at the University of Amsterdam.
