= Betty de Boer =

Dutch politician (born 1971)

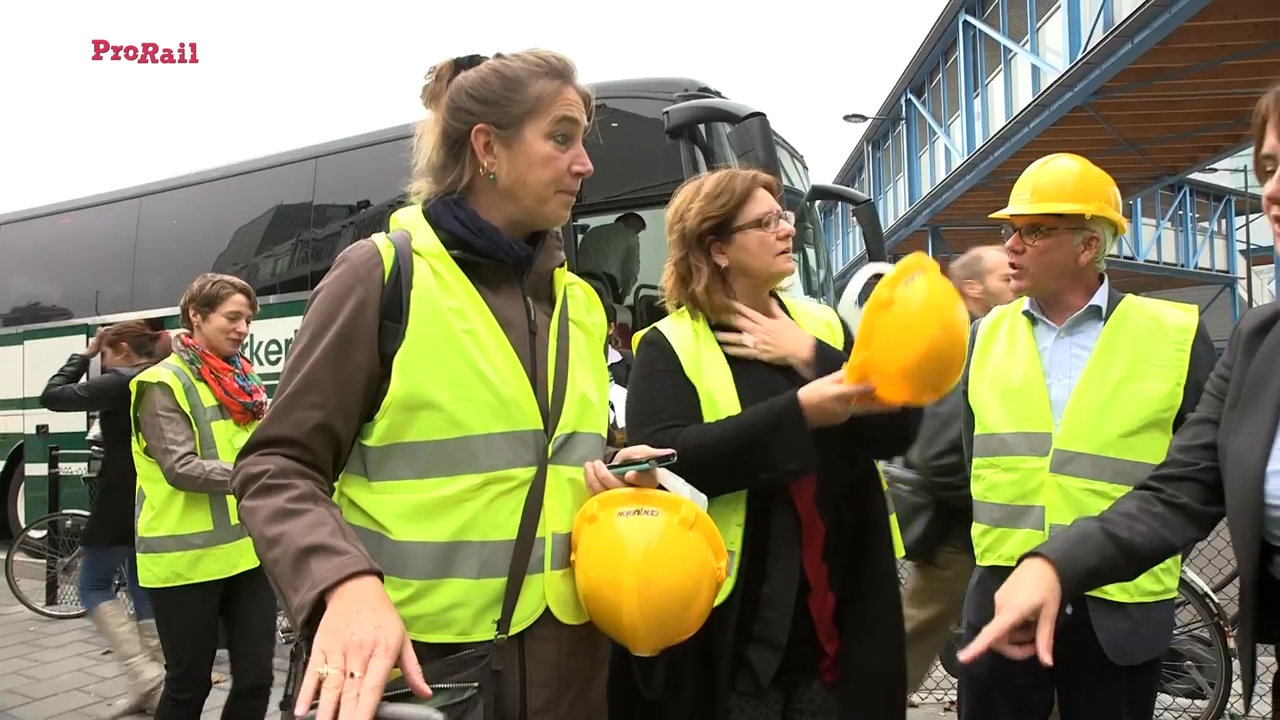

Member of the House of Representatives
- In office 17 June 2010 – 23 March 2017

Personal details
- Born: 2 September 1971 (age 54) Surhuisterveen
- Party: People's Party for Freedom and Democracy
- Occupation: Politician

Bregtje Grietje "Betty" de Boer (born 2 September 1971 in Surhuisterveen) is a Dutch politician and former management consultant and civil servant. As a member of the People's Party for Freedom and Democracy (Volkspartij voor Vrijheid en Democratie) she was an MP between 17 June 2010 and 23 March 2017. She focused on matters of housing.

== Biography ==
De Boer completed secondary school in Drachten and studied legal administration at the University of Groningen. She then worked for various municipalities and companies. In 2004 she started her own consultancy firm, aimed at SMEs and government.

In 2002, De Boer was elected a councilor for the VVD in the city council of the city of Groningen. She focused on spatial planning and traffic and transport. In 2006 she succeeded Remco Kouwenhoven as party leader. De Boer was a member of the council committees for Finance & Security and Spatial Planning & Housing. She was also a member of the audit committee.

On 9 June 2010, De Boer was elected a member of the House of Representatives. She was spokeswoman for railways, public transport, sea and inland shipping and ports in the House. In 2010 she was in 10th place on the electoral list; in 2012 in place 11. In 2017 she was not on the list of candidates.

Since 1 September 2017, De Boer has been working as a relationship manager at the Maggie's Center in Groningen. She has also been interim director of the Groningen-Assen Region since 1 September 2018.

Furthermore, De Boer is treasurer of the board of the Bunno Mezclado Foundation, chairman of the supervisory board of the Stichting Omroep Organisatie Groningen, chairman of the supervisory board of the Building Foundation and chairman of the South Western Quarter Area Committee.
