= Anne-Wil Lucas =

Dutch politician

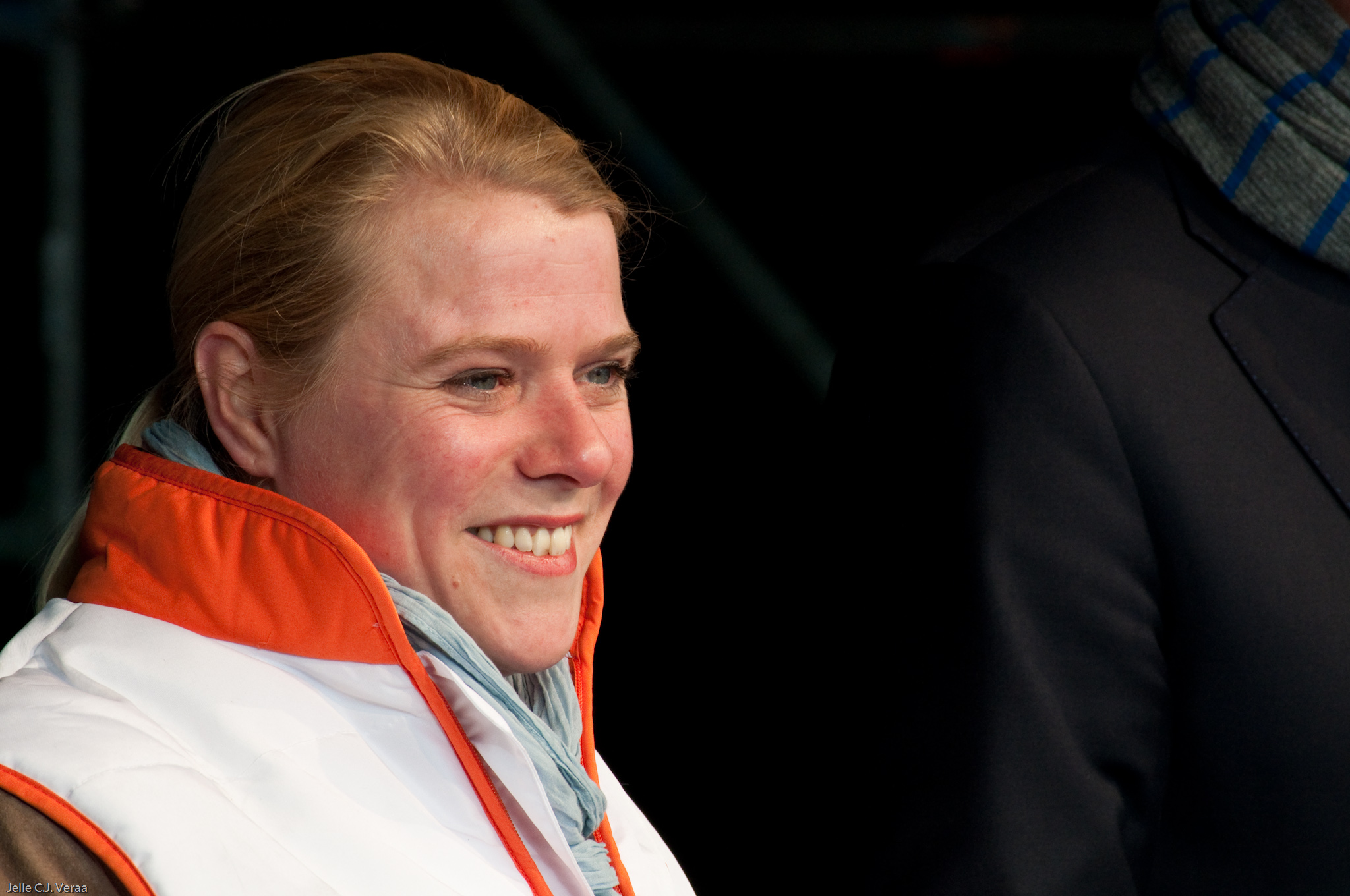

Member of the House of Representatives
- In office 17 June 2010 – 7 September 2016

Personal details
- Born: Antoinette Wilhelmina Lucas-Smeerdijk; 10 January 1975 (age 51) Warnsveld
- Party: People's Party for Freedom and Democracy
- Occupation: Politician

Antoinette Wilhelmina (Anne-Wil) Lucas-Smeerdijk (born 10 January 1975) is a Dutch politician. As a member of the People's Party for Freedom and Democracy she was a member of the House of Representatives from 17 June 2010 to 7 September 2016. She was replaced by Daniël van der Ree. Lucas focused on matters of higher education, science and the flood control in the Netherlands.

Lucas studied urban planning at Wageningen University.

== Electoral history ==
A (possibly incomplete) overview of Dutch elections Lucas participated in
Election	Party	Candidate number	Votes
2010 Dutch general election	People's Party for Freedom and Democracy	29	2,028
2012 Dutch general election	People's Party for Freedom and Democracy	28	1,733
2015 Dutch provincial elections in Friesland	People's Party for Freedom and Democracy	50	110
