= Metin Çelik =

Turkish-Dutch politician and police officer

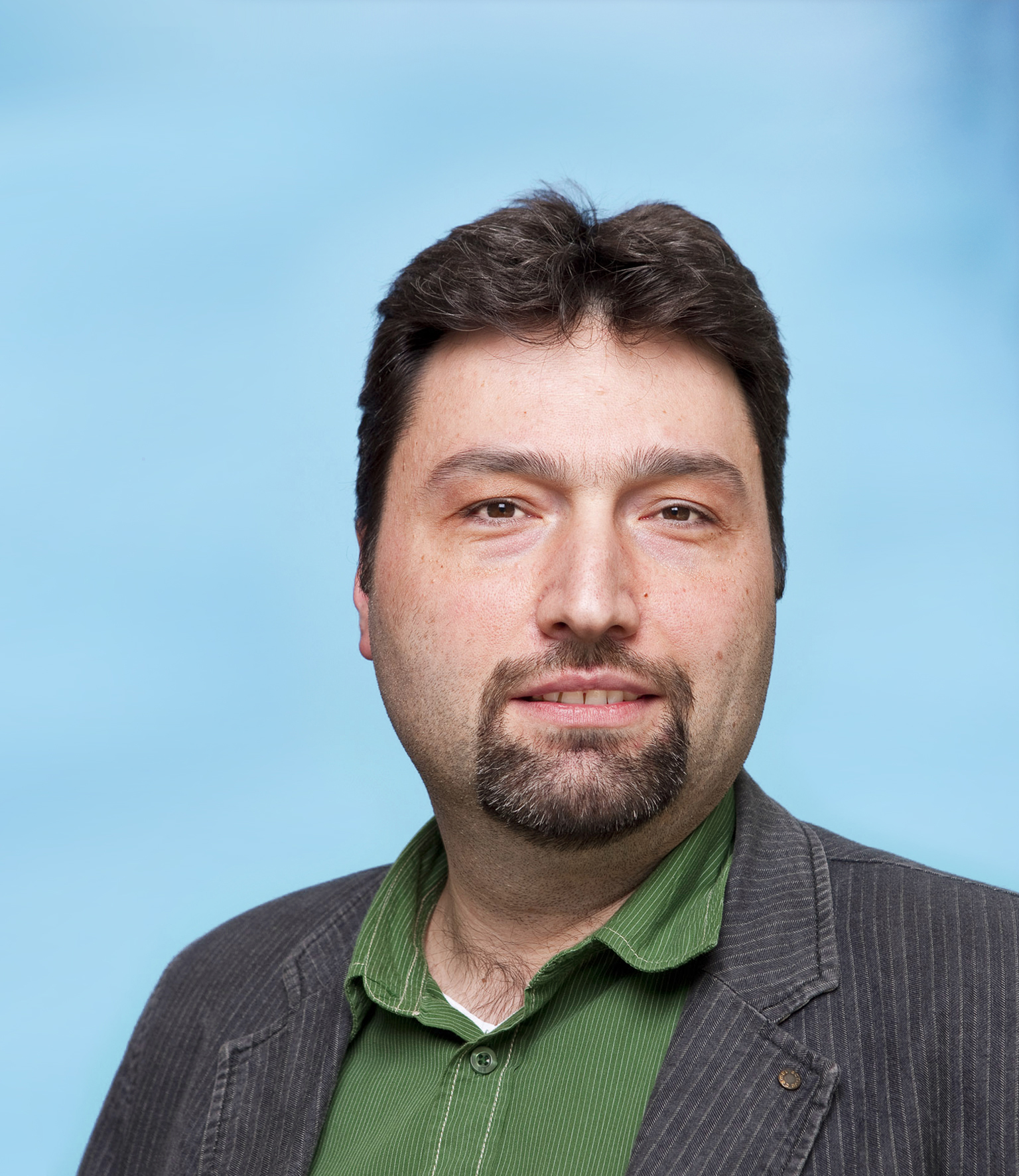

Metin Çelik (born 3 April 1970 in Gölcük) is a Turkish-Dutch politician and former police officer. As a member of the Dutch Labour Party (Partij van de Arbeid) he was an MP from 17 June 2010 to 19 September 2012. He focused on matters of primary, secondary and special education. As of 28 March, 2019, he has been the chairman of the DENK political party.

Çelik is a former police officer of the city of Rotterdam and its suburbs. From 1998 to 2010, he was a member of the municipal council of Rotterdam.
