= Joost Taverne =

Dutch politician

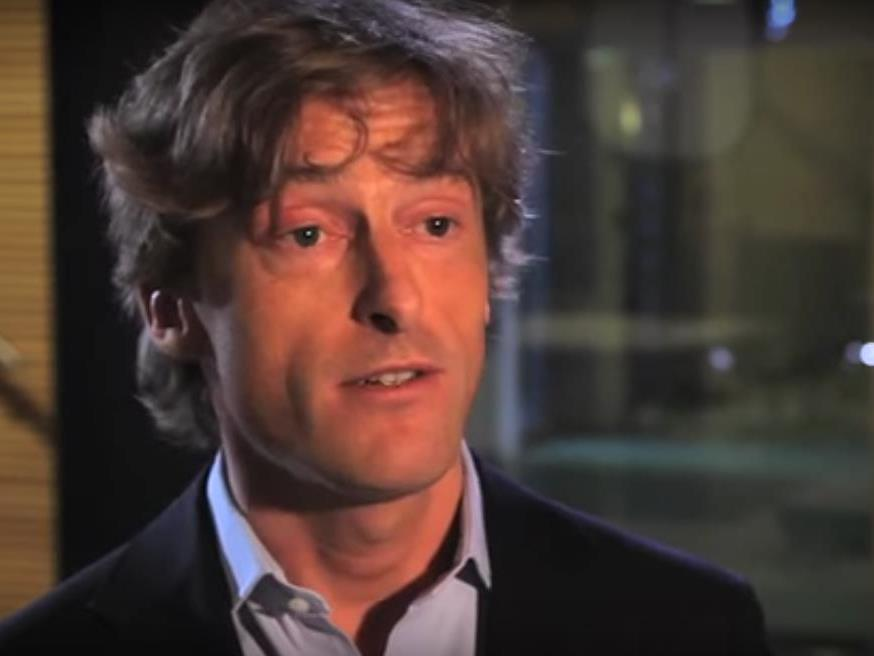
- Joost Taverne (2016)

Member of the House of Representatives
- In office 8 November 2012 – 23 March 2017
- In office 26 October 2010 – 19 September 2012

Personal details
- Born: 22 September 1971 (age 54)
- Party: People's Party for Freedom and Democracy
- Occupation: Politician

Joost Taverne (born 22 September 1971) is a Dutch politician of the People's Party for Freedom and Democracy (VVD). He was an MP between 8 November 2012 and 23 March 2017. He was previously an MP from 26 October 2010 to 19 September 2012.

== Amendment to Dutch Copyright Act ==
One of the important achievements of Taverne regarding Dutch law was his amendment on the Copyright law of the Netherlands, which amendment was passed by the Dutch House of Representatives in February 2015. Added to Dutch Copyright Law was art. 25fa, stating that scientific publications funded with public money should be available in open access "following a reasonable period of time after the work was first published" (practically accepted to be 6 months).
