= Jack Biskop =

Dutch psychologist and politician

Member of the House of Representatives of the Netherlands
- In office 26 October 2010 – 19 September 2012
- In office 30 November 2006 – 17 June 2010

Personal details
- Born: Jacobus Johannes Gerardus Maria Biskop; 15 January 1956 (age 70) Roosendaal, Netherlands
- Party: Christian Democratic Appeal (Christen-Democratisch Appèl - CDA)
- Spouse: Married
- Education: Tilburg University (MA, Psychology)
- Occupation: Politician, management consultant, counselor
- Website: (in Dutch) Christian Democratic Appeal website

Jacobus Johannes Gerardus Maria (Jack) Biskop (born 15 January 1956 in Roosendaal) is a Dutch psychologist and politician. As a member of the Christian Democratic Appeal (Dutch: Christen-Democratisch Appèl), he was an MP from 26 October 2010 to 19 September 2012, focusing on education.

Biskop was born in the province of North Brabant and studied psychology at Tilburg University, with a specialization in developmental psychology, educational psychology and educational sociology. He worked at a school counseling service in Western North Brabant, performed several management positions and had a management consultancy firm of his own from 1994 to 2006.

From 1982 to 1986 he was a member of the municipal council of Roosendaal, and from 1991 to 2003, a member of the States-Provincial of North Brabant. He served as an MP in the Dutch House of Representatives from November 2006 to June 2010, and served again from October 2010 to September 2012. From 2010 to 2012, he was also President of the Benelux Parliament.

Although not in favour of governing with the Party for Freedom (PVV), he was loyal to the coalition agreement of the Rutte cabinet.

== Decorations ==
- In 2003 he was awarded Member of the Order of Orange-Nassau.
- In 2012 he was awarded Knight of the Order of Orange-Nassau.
