= Ino van den Besselaar =

Dutch politician (born 1948)

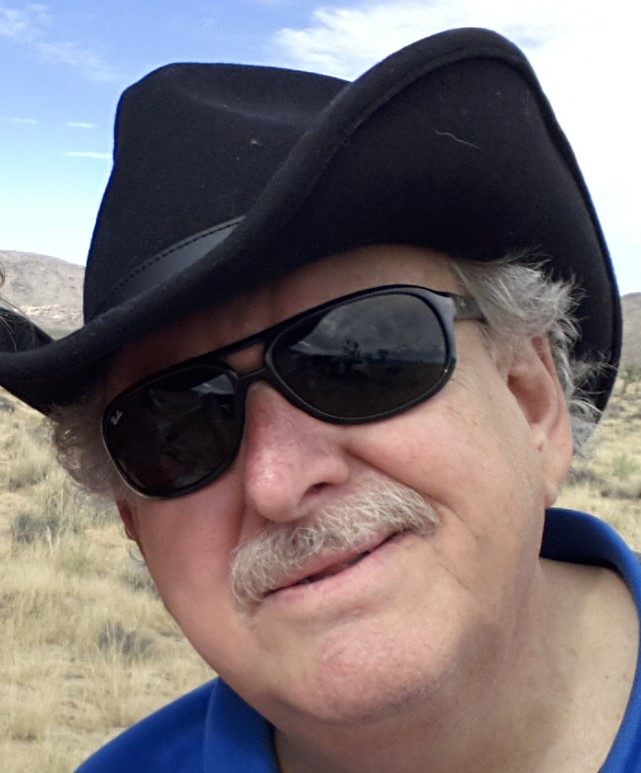

I.H.C. (Ino) van den Besselaar (born 14 November 1948 in The Hague) is a Dutch former politician. As a member of the Party for Freedom (Partij voor de Vrijheid) he was an MP from 23 November 2010 to 19 September 2012, succeeding James Sharpe. He focused on matters of social affairs, pensions and government spending.
