= Nine Kooiman =

Dutch politician and social worker

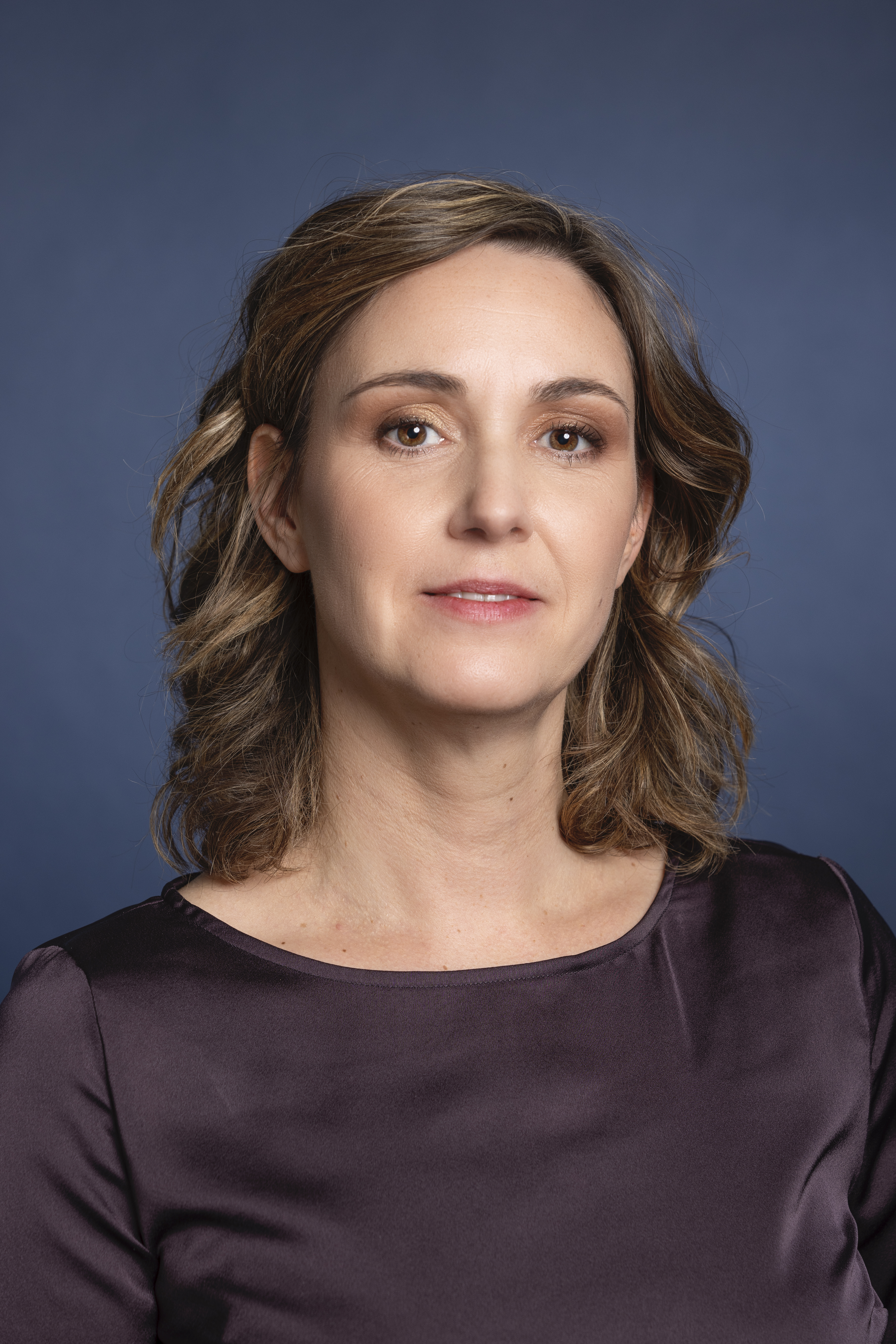
- Kooiman in 2024

Member of the House of Representatives
- In office 17 June 2010 – 29 March 2018

Personal details
- Born: 9 December 1980 (age 45) De Meern
- Party: Socialist Party
- Occupation: Politician

Catharina Johanna Elise (Nine) Kooiman (born 9 December 1980 in De Meern, Utrecht) is a Dutch politician and former social worker. As a member of the Socialist Party (Socialistische Partij) she has been an MP from 17 June 2010 until 29 March 2018. She focused on matters of youth and family law.

From 2007 to 2010 she was a member of the municipal council of Nieuwegein.

Kooiman studied social work and public services at the Hogeschool De Horst in Driebergen.
