= List of Labour Party (Netherlands) MPs =

This is a list of members of the House of Representatives of the Netherlands for the Labour Party (PvdA).

== List ==
Member	Start date	End date	Ref.
Jan Achttienribbe-Buijs	14 September 1989	16 May 1994	
Karin Adelmund	17 May 1994	2 August 1998	
Karin Adelmund	23 May 2002	20 October 2005	
Sjoukje Akkerman	11 June 1991	16 May 1994	
Nebahat Albayrak	19 May 1998	21 February 2007	
Nebahat Albayrak	12 May 2010	11 April 2011	
Nebahat Albayrak	2 August 2011	19 September 2012	
Wim Albers	28 August 1973	16 July 1979	
Hans Alders	11 November 1982	6 November 1989	
Kees van den Anker	15 September 1977	5 January 1978	
Kees van den Anker	28 August 1979	4 November 1982	
Thanasis Apostolou	14 september 1989	18 May 1998	
Thanasis Apostolou	25 August 1998	22 May 2002	
Khadija Arib	19 May 1998	29 November 2006	
Khadija Arib	1 March 2007	3 November 2022	
Amma Asante	7 September 2016	22 March 2017	
Lodewijk Asscher	23 March 2017	30 March 2021	
Ies Baart	6 November 1956	19 March 1959	
Ies Baart	24 March 1959	21 February 1967	
Nel Barendregt	14 November 1967	7 June 1977	
Marleen Barth	19 May 1998	22 May 2002	
Relus ter Beek	11 May 1971	6 November 1989	
Relus ter Beek	17 May 1994	31 December 1995	
Jacqueline Beijlen-Geerts	14 September 1989	16 May 1994	
Judith Belinfante	19 May 1998	22 May 2002	
Dick Benschop	23 May 2002	31 August 2002	
Ed Berg	21 June 1966	11 January 1971	
Joop van den Berg	21 January 1988	16 May 1994	
Jan Johannis Adriaan Berger	15 July 1952	20 September 1954	
Jan Johannis Adriaan Berger	20 March 1959	9 May 1965 (Note: He later served as an MP on behalf of the Democratic Socialists '70.)	
Harry van den Bergh	8 June 1977	2 September 1987	
Rob van den Bergh	8 January 1963	4 June 1963	
Rob van den Bergh	29 June 1965	21 February 1967	
Rob van den Bergh	18 April 1967	9 May 1971	
Marianne Besselink	30 November 2006	16 June 2010	
Jaap Blom	16 September 1952	25 May 1966	
Luuk Blom	30 January 2003	16 June 2010	
Gerard Boekhoven	19 December 1951	14 July 1952	
Gerard Boekhoven	6 November 1956	19 March 1959	
Jan Boelhouwer	30 January 2003	29 November 2006	
Jan Boelhouwer	15 January 2008	16 June 2010	
Margreeth de Boer	19 May 1998	6 November 2001	
Eppo Bolhuis	16 January 2001	22 May 2002	
Jan Bommer	9 December 1952 (Note: He had been an MP on behalf of the Social Democratic Workers' Party before the May 1946 general election.)	21 February 1967	
Désirée Bonis	20 September 2012	12 June 2013	
Rie de Boois	7 December 1972	16 November 1987	
Henk van den Born	4 June 1946	2 July 1956	
Henk van den Born	23 October 1956	19 March 1959	
Wouter Bos	19 May 1998	23 March 2000	
Wouter Bos	23 May 2002	21 February 2007	
Samira Bouchibti	30 November 2006	16 June 2010	
Lea Bouwmeester	30 November 2006	13 May 2013	
Lea Bouwmeester	3 September 2013	29 February 2016	
Lea Bouwmeester	10 June 2016	22 March 2017	
Cor Brandsma	16 October 1962	21 February 1967	
Gerda Brautigam	5 June 1963	6 December 1972	
Bert Broekhuis	15 September 1981	15 September 1982	
Harm Brouwer	5 November 2015	11 January 2016	
Harm Brouwer	1 March 2016	9 June 2016	
Harm Brouwer	6 July 2016	22 March 2017	
Rintje van der Brug	4 June 1946 (Note: He had been an MP on behalf of the Christian Democratic Union before the May 1946 general election.)	14 July 1952	
Mieke van der Burg	16 November 1989	16 May 1994	
Mieke van der Burg	21 June 1994	18 May 1998	
Jaap Burger	4 June 1946	15 September 1962	
Julian Bushoff	22 November 2022	27 October 2023 (Note: He continued to serve as an MP in the GroenLinks–PvdA group.)	
Jet Bussemaker	19 May 1998	21 February 2007	
Flip Buurmeijer	28 August 1979	31 December 1994	
Frits Castricum	8 June 1977	16 May 1994	
Yasemin Çegerek	18 June 2013	21 August 2013	
Yasemin Çegerek	12 December 2013	22 March 2017	
Metin Çelik	17 June 2010	19 September 2012	
Dick de Cloe	15 September 1981	15 September 1982	
Dick de Cloe	3 June 1986	22 May 2002	
Job Cohen	17 June 2010	28 February 2012	
Ferd Crone	17 May 1994	19 November 2007	
Frits Daams	6 November 1956	31 October 1969	
Ien Dales	16 September 1982	15 May 1987	
Martijn van Dam	30 January 2003	2 November 2015	
Marcel van Dam	8 June 1977	10 September 1981	
Marcel van Dam	16 September 1982	21 January 1986	
Piet Dankert	6 February 1968	9 June 1981	
Coen Deering	23 July 1946	26 July 1948	
Coen Deering	4 December 1956	30 April 1957	
Tjeerd van Dekken	17 June 2010	22 March 2017	
Staf Depla	4 October 2000	22 May 2002	
Staf Depla	30 January 2003	11 May 2010	
Gijs van Dijk	23 March 2017	14 February 2022	
Otwin van Dijk	20 September 2012	5 July 2016	
Marjo van Dijken	30 January 2003	29 November 2006	
Marjo van Dijken	1 March 2007	16 June 2010	
Sharon Dijksma	17 May 1994	21 February 2007	
Sharon Dijksma	17 June 2010	16 January 2012	
Sharon Dijksma	8 May 2012	19 September 2012	
Sharon Dijksma	23 March 2017	31 May 2018	
Gerda Dijksman	17 May 1994	31 August 1997	
Jeroen Dijsselbloem	28 March 2000	22 May 2002	
Jeroen Dijsselbloem	20 November 2002	4 November 2012	
Jeroen Dijsselbloem	23 March 2017	24 October 2017	
Sjoera Dikkers	17 June 2010	24 October 2016	
Sjoera Dikkers	15 February 2017	22 March 2017	
Jaap van der Doef	28 May 1973	10 September 1981	
Jaap van der Doef	16 September 1982	28 February 1986	
Hans van den Doel	23 February 1967	27 August 1973	
Anneke van Dok-van Weele	26 May 1998	31 May 1999	
Dick Dolman	12 May 1970	30 June 1990	
Leen Donker	4 June 1946	1 September 1952	
Kris Douma	30 January 2003	29 November 2006	
Willem Drees	4 June 1946	8 July 1946	
Willem Drees	27 July 1948	9 August 1948	
Willem Drees	15 July 1952	1 September 1952	
Willem Drees	3 July 1956	2 October 1956	
Herman Drenth	4 September 1973	5 September 1979	
Niesco Dubbelboer	30 January 2003	29 November 2006	
Desirée Duijkers	19 May 1998	22 May 2002	
Dirk Duinker	15 September 1977	11 January 1978	
Dirk Duinker	28 June 1978	6 December 1983	
Wim Duisenberg	8 June 1977	7 September 1977	
Wim Duisenberg	16 January 1978	27 June 1978	
Adrie Duivesteijn	17 May 1994	30 May 2006	
Cees Egas	15 July 1952	9 May 1965	
Cees Egas	23 February 1967	6 December 1972	
Angelien Eijsink	30 January 2003	22 March 2017	
Jan Emmens	12 August 1948	14 July 1952	
Henk Engelsman	28 October 1958	19 March 1959	
Henk Engelsman	18 September 1962	21 February 1967	
Meiny Epema-Brugman	28 April 1970	9 May 1971	
Meiny Epema-Brugman	17 August 1972	15 September 1982	
Jaap Jelle Feenstra	21 January 1988	13 September 1989	
Jaap Jelle Feenstra	16 November 1989	16 May 1994	
Jaap Jelle Feenstra	18 March 1997	22 May 2002	
Thea Fierens	30 January 2003	29 November 2006	
Manon Fokke	20 September 2012	21 September 2015	
Manon Fokke	12 January 2016	22 March 2017	
Huub Franssen	23 October 1956	7 June 1977	
Wim van Gelder	3 June 1986	18 May 1998	
Wout van der Gevel	8 June 1965	14 November 1967	
Rob van Gijzel	14 September 1989	16 May 1994	
Rob van Gijzel	30 August 1994	27 November 2001	
Chantal Gill'ard	30 November 2006	8 February 2010	
Chantal Gill'ard	1 June 2010	16 June 2010	
Frans Goedhart	8 October 1946 (Note: He had served as an independent MP before.)	14 May 1970 (Note: He continued to serve as an independent MP until 9 May 1971 after leaving the Labour Party.)	
Lambert Giebels	28 May 1973	7 June 1977	
Marinus van der Goes van Naters	4 June 1946	19 March 1959	
Marinus van der Goes van Naters	24 March 1959	21 February 1967	
Wouter Gortzak	19 May 1998	22 May 2002	
Arie de Graaf	12 October 1976	9 June 1981	
Ed Groot	17 June 2010	22 March 2017	
Sultan Günal-Gezer	8 November 2012	22 March 2017	
Ineke Haas-Berger	11 May 1971	31 May 1991	
José Hageman	1 September 1987	13 September 1989	
Kees ten Hagen	4 June 1946 (Note: He had been an independent MP before the May 1946 general election.)	10 March 1957	
Henk de Hamer	1 September 1977	9 June 1981	
Mariëtte Hamer	19 May 1998	9 September 2014	
Henk Hartmeijer	7 December 1972	9 June 1981	
Frank Heemskerk	30 January 2003	29 November 2006	
Peter van Heemst	10 September 1991	16 May 2006	
Ton Heerts	30 November 2006	16 June 2010	
Pierre Heijnen	1 March 2007	31 August 2013	
Arie van der Hek	28 May 1973	31 August 1987	
Eveline Herfkens	15 September 1981	31 August 1990	
Eveline Herfkens	23 May 2002	25 July 2002	
Took Heroma-Meilink	15 September 1953	9 May 1971	
Willem Herreburgh	26 August 1998	22 May 2002	
Godelieve van Heteren	17 October 2002	29 November 2006	
Myrthe Hilkens	12 April 2011	1 August 2011	
Myrthe Hilkens	17 January 2012	28 August 2013	
Rik Hindriks	1 June 1999	22 May 2002	
Annet van der Hoek	25 August 1998	22 May 2002	
Henk Hofstra	30 October 1946	12 October 1956	
Henk Hofstra	20 March 1959	31 December 1960	
Theo Hogendorp	21 September 1965	15 August 1968	
Duco Hoogland	8 November 2012	22 March 2017	
Habtamu de Hoop	31 March 2021	27 October 2023	
Jo Horn	7 November 2001	22 May 2002	
Hamid Houda	30 August 1994	17 November 1997	
Kirsten van den Hul	23 March 2017	30 March 2021	
Rein Hummel	16 September 1982	13 September 1989	
Servaas Huys	3 June 1986	16 May 1994	
Servaas Huys	30 August 1994	18 May 1998	
Wijnie Jabaaij	15 September 1977	30 December 1977	
Wijnie Jabaaij	1 March 1979	13 September 1989	
Lutz Jacobi	30 November 2006	22 March 2017	
Tanja Jadnanansing	17 June 2010	6 September 2016	
Henk Jans	11 May 1971	6 December 1972	
Paul Janssen	7 December 1972 (Note: He had served as an MP on behalf of the Catholic People's Party and the Political Party of Radicals before.)	1 October 1976	
Dolf Joekes	4 June 1946 (Note: He had been an MP on behalf of Free-thinking Democratic League before the May 1946 general election.)	6 August 1948	
Dolf Joekes	23 July 1952	31 October 1952	
Arie de Jong	3 July 1990	16 May 1994	
Arie de Jong	3 September 1997	18 May 1998	
Siepie de Jong	28 May 1973	9 June 1981	
Erik Jurgens	1 February 1990 (Note: He had served as an MP on behalf of the Political Party of Radicals before.)	16 May 1994	
Jacques de Kadt	27 July 1948	4 June 1963	
Paul Kalma	30 November 2006	16 June 2010	
Ella Kalsbeek	14 September 1989	1 January 2001	
Ella Kalsbeek	23 May 2002	29 November 2006	
Flip de Kam	15 September 1977	5 January 1978	
Barbara Kathmann	31 March 2021	27 October 2023 (Note: She continued to serve as an MP in the GroenLinks–PvdA group.)	
Jos van Kemenade	8 June 1977	7 September 1977	
Jos van Kemenade	16 January 1978	10 September 1981	
Jos van Kemenade	16 September 1982	31 August 1984	
Joke Kersten	4 September 1990	16 May 1994	
John Kerstens	20 September 2012	22 March 2017	
John Kerstens	5 June 2018	30 March 2021	
Heine Keuning	28 August 1979	9 June 1981	
Eefje Klaassens-Postema	11 May 1971	31 May 1974	
Cors Kleijwegt	3 July 1956	21 February 1967	
Ger Klein	7 December 1972	10 May 1973	
Ger Klein	8 June 1977	4 February 1980	
Jetta Klijnsma	17 June 2010	4 November 2012	
Henk Knol	8 June 1977	13 September 1989	
Jan Knot	11 May 1971	7 June 1977	
Bert Koenders	11 November 1997	21 February 2007	
Wim Kok	3 June 1986	6 November 1989	
Wim Kok	17 May 1994	21 August 1994	
Wim Kok	19 May 1998	2 August 1998	
Kees Kolthoff	28 May 1973	9 June 1981	
Hans Kombrink	7 December 1972	10 September 1981	
Hans Kombrink	16 September 1982	30 April 1990	
Martin Konings	6 February 1973	2 June 1986	
Jo Koopman	6 November 1956	30 September 1963	
Lucy Kortram	19 May 1998	22 May 2002	
Aad Kosto	7 December 1972	6 November 1989	
Aad Kosto	17 May 1994	10 September 1994	
Guus Krähe	17 November 2006	29 November 2006	
Jacob Kramer	6 November 1956	4 June 1963	
Ferdinand Kranenburg	27 November 1958	31 January 1964	
Margot Kraneveldt	1 March 2007 (Note: She had served as an MP on behalf of Pim Fortuyn List before.)	16 June 2010	
Margot Kraneveldt	10 April 2012	7 May 2012	
Annie Krouwel-Vlam	18 January 1977	16 July 1979	
Joanneke Kruijsen	30 January 2006	29 November 2006	
Arie Kuijper	25 August 1998	22 May 2002	
Attje Kuiken	30 November 2006	18 January 2010	
Attje Kuiken	11 May 2010	27 October 2023 (Note: She continued to serve as an MP in the GroenLinks–PvdA group until 5 December 2023.)	
Evert Kupers	4 June 1946	26 July 1948	
Tunahan Kuzu	20 September 2012	14 November 2014 (Note: He continued to serve as an MP on behalf of DENK until 5 December 2023 after leaving the Labour Party.)	
Reint Laan	4 February 1964	29 February 1968	
Saskia Laaper	19 January 2010	10 May 2010	
Roelof van Laar	14 May 2013	22 March 2017	
Cees Laban	18 December 1967	4 September 1977	
Jan Lamberts	6 November 1956	7 June 1977	
Jeroen de Lange	25 January 2012	19 September 2012	
Henk Leenders	3 September 2013	11 December 2013	
Henk Leenders	10 September 2014	22 March 2017	
John Leerdam	30 January 2003	16 June 2010	
John Leerdam	29 February 2012	4 April 2012	
Gerard van der Leeuw	4 June 1946	9 July 1946	
Bob Leibbrandt	13 July 1965	21 February 1967	
Frans Leijnse	4 September 1984	16 May 1994	
Trees Lemaire	28 March 1957	16 September 1963	
Arie Lems	23 February 1967	15 August 1972	
Piet Lieftinck	4 June 1946	7 July 1946	
Johanneke Liemburg	17 May 1994	18 May 1998	
Kees van Lienden	4 June 1946	30 September 1962	
Theo van Lier	15 July 1952	31 August 1973	
John Lilipaly	3 June 1986	18 May 1998	
Patricia Linhard	12 May 2009	16 June 2010	
Johann Logemann	4 June 1946	7 October 1947	
Jan Lonink	17 January 1989	16 May 1994	
Dirk de Loor	12 August 1948	11 September 1953	
André van der Louw	12 January 1971	9 May 1971	
André van der Louw	16 September 1982	15 April 1983	
Marit Maij	20 September 2012	22 March 2017	
Sicco Mansholt	4 June 1946	17 July 1946	
Sicco Mansholt	27 July 1948	9 August 1948	
Sicco Mansholt	15 July 1952	6 September 1952	
Sicco Mansholt	3 July 1956	2 October 1956	
Ahmed Marcouch	17 June 2010	22 March 2017	
Jan Masman	23 February 1967	15 January 1977	
Peter Meijer	8 November 2005	29 November 2006	
Wim Meijer	11 May 1971	7 June 1977	
Ad Melkert	3 June 1986	21 August 1994	
Ad Melkert	19 May 1998	16 October 2002	
Bert Middel	16 November 1989	16 May 1994	
Bert Middel	30 August 1994	22 May 2002	
Ruud van Middelkoop	15 October 1991	16 May 1994	
Adriaan van Mierlo	6 October 1977	5 January 1978	
Mohammed Mohandis	20 September 2012	22 March 2017	
Mohammed Mohandis	2 June 2022	27 October 2023	
Hillie Molenaar	5 September 2000	22 May 2002	
Henk Molleman	3 February 1976	28 February 1979	
Jacques Monasch	17 June 2010	8 November 2016 (Note: He continued to serve as an independent MP until 22 March 2017 after leaving the Labour Party.)	
Frans Moor	15 September 1977	30 September 1991	
William Moorlag	25 October 2017	30 March 2021	
Ina Müller-van Ast	8 June 1977	13 September 1989	
Songül Mutluer	17 February 2022	27 October 2023	
Karel Nagel	28 May 1973	7 June 1977	
Gerard Nederhorst	16 August 1946	26 July 1948	
Gerard Nederhorst	21 December 1948	9 May 1971	
Tineke Netelenbos	10 September 1987	21 August 1994	
Tineke Netelenbos	19 May 1998	2 August 1998	
Tineke Netelenbos	23 May 2002	29 January 2003	
Frits Niessen	6 October 1977	5 January 1978	
Frits Niessen	27 August 1980	16 May 1994	
Jeltje van Nieuwenhoven	15 September 1981	15 September 1982	
Jeltje van Nieuwenhoven	16 June 1983	26 October 2004	
Henk Nijboer	20 September 2012	27 October 2023 (Note: He continued to serve as an MP in the GroenLinks–PvdA group until 5 December 2023.)	
Saskia Noorman-den Uyl	17 May 1994	29 November 2006	
Marjet Ockels	4 June 1991	21 September 1993 (Note: She continued to serve as an independent MP until 16 May 1994 after leaving the Labour Party.)	
Ad Oele	5 June 1963	31 January 1973	
David van Ooijen	11 May 1971	2 June 1986	
Astrid Oosenbrug	20 September 2012	22 March 2017	
Gerrit Jan van Otterloo	2 September 1986	16 May 1994 (Note: He later served as an MP on behalf of 50PLUS.)	
Rob Oudkerk	17 May 1994	22 May 2002	
Gerritjan van Oven	17 May 1994	22 May 2002	
Gerritjan van Oven	10 September 2002	29 January 2003	
Selçuk Öztürk	8 November 2012	14 November 2014 (Note: He continued to serve as an MP on behalf of DENK until 30 March 2021 after leaving the Labour Party.)	
Annemiek Padt-Jansen	3 June 1969	9 May 1971	
Annemiek Padt-Jansen	14 March 1972	6 December 1972	
Lambertus Nicodemus Palar	4 June 1946	21 July 1947	
Connie Patijn	6 November 1956	21 February 1967	
Schelto Patijn	28 May 1973	15 June 1984	
Harry Peschar	16 September 1952	31 January 1968	
Kati Piri	31 March 2021	27 October 2023	
Ronald Plasterk	17 June 2010	4 November 2012	
Rick van der Ploeg	17 May 1994	2 August 1998	
Sake van der Ploeg	29 June 1965	9 May 1971	
Ans Ploeg-Ploeg	16 October 1951	19 March 1959	
Lilianne Ploumen	23 March 2017	21 April 2022	
Jaap le Poole	5 November 1947	26 July 1948	
Stan Poppe	7 December 1972	1 September 1986	
Siep Posthumus	6 June 1946	3 May 1965	
Siep Posthumus	23 February 1967	9 May 1971	
Wilfried de Pree	10 June 1981	16 May 1994	
Jan Pronk	11 May 1971	10 May 1973	
Jan Pronk	8 June 1977	7 September 1977	
Jan Pronk	16 January 1978	17 August 1980	
Jan Pronk	3 June 1986	6 November 1989	
Jan Pronk	18 May 1994	21 August 1994	
Jan Pronk	19 May 1998	2 August 1998	
Monique Quint-Maagdenberg	16 November 1989	16 May 1994	
Jeroen Recourt	17 June 2010	22 March 2017	
Jan Reehorst	23 October 1956	22 February 1967	
Peter Rehwinkel	24 January 1995	22 May 2002	
Peter Rehwinkel	3 September 2002	19 November 2002	
Aat van Rhijn	3 July 1956	2 October 1956	
Hessel Rienks	11 September 1974	13 September 1989	
Leni van Rijn-Vellekoop	19 May 1987	16 May 1994	
Lia Roefs	27 October 2004	16 June 2010	
Peter Roels	11 May 1971	9 June 1981	
Dirk Roemers	16 September 1952	31 October 1967	
Hein Roethof	4 November 1969	15 September 1982	
Hein Roethof	28 January 1986	13 September 1989	
Corrie de Roos-Oudegeest	6 November 1956	4 June 1963	
Evan Rozenblad	18 May 1994	14 June 1994	
Marianne Ruigrok-Verreijt	14 September 1989	16 May 1994	
Piet de Ruiter	11 May 1971	31 January 1976	
Geert Ruygers	25 July 1946	17 February 1970	
Nora Salomons	7 December 1972	3 June 1986	
Ivo Samkalden	20 March 1959	31 August 1960	
Diederik Samson	30 January 2003	13 December 2016	
Usman Santi	25 August 1998	22 May 2002	
Ge Schaapman	8 June 1977	15 September 1982	
Jan Schaefer	11 May 1971	10 May 1973	
Jan Schaefer	8 June 1977	5 September 1978	
Jan Schaefer	3 June 1986	22 January 1990	
Sijbrand Schagen	10 January 1961	5 June 1963	
Johan Scheps	4 June 1946	21 February 1967	
Willem Schermerhorn	4 June 1946	15 September 1946	
Willem Schermerhorn	27 July 1948	17 September 1951	
Jan Schilthuis	4 June 1946	2 July 1956	
Tineke Schilthuis	6 November 1956	22 February 1967	
Adri Schipper	5 March 1968	23 April 1970	
Gerrit Schoenmakers	25 August 1998	22 May 2002	
Leo Schoots	14 September 1989	16 May 1994	
Arie Jan Schouwenaar	4 February 1958	19 March 1959	
Arie Jan Schouwenaar	21 June 1960	11 December 1962	
Wybrand Schuitemaker	16 June 1965	21 February 1967	
Wybrand Schuitemaker	26 February 1970	14 May 1970 (Note: He continued to serve as an MP for Democratic Socialists '70 until 31 August 1973 after leaving the Labour Party.)	
Fedde Schurer	6 November 1956	4 June 1963	
Michiel Servaes	20 September 2012	22 March 2017	
Hannie Singer-Dekker	5 June 1963	9 May 1970	
Harm van Sleen	4 June 1946	13 October 1958	
Willem Sloots	4 March 1986	2 June 1986	
Pauline Smeets	30 January 2003	19 September 2012	
José Smits	19 May 1998	22 May 2002	
José Smits	30 January 2003	29 November 2006	
Hans Spekman	30 November 2006	24 January 2012	
Bonno Spieker	8 June 1977	9 June 1981	
Bonno Spieker	15 September 1981	16 May 1994	
John Spinks	11 May 1971	7 June 1977	
Laurette Spoelman	19 May 1998	22 May 2002	
Bram Stemerdink	25 August 1970	10 May 1973	
Bram Stemerdink	14 June 1977	13 September 1977	
Bram Stemerdink	16 January 1978	10 September 1981	
Bram Stemerdink	16 September 1982	16 May 1994	
Mieke Sterk	30 August 1994	18 May 1998	
Max van der Stoel	5 June 1963	21 July 1965	
Max van der Stoel	23 February 1967	10 May 1973	
Max van der Stoel	8 June 1977	7 September 1977	
Max van der Stoel	16 January 1978	10 September 1981	
Piet Stoffelen	11 May 1971	16 May 1994	
Jo Stokvis	4 June 1946	15 October 1946	
Piet Straub	30 January 2003	29 November 2006	
Nico Stufkens	10 September 1947	19 March 1959	
Hannie Stuurman	30 January 2003	29 November 2006	
Ko Suurhoff	24 October 1946	1 September 1952	
Ko Suurhoff	3 July 1956	2 October 1956	
Ko Suurhoff	20 March 1959	13 April 1965	
Paul Tang	1 March 2007	16 June 2010	
Sjeng Tans	7 October 1954	2 July 1970	
Willie Swildens-Rozendaal	3 June 1986	16 May 1994	
Willie Swildens-Rozendaal	30 August 1994	22 May 2002	
Grace Tanamal	8 November 2012	22 March 2017	
Rob Tazelaar	10 June 1981	31 December 1988	
Uke Tellegen-Veldstra	6 November 1956	4 June 1963	
Bas van den Tempel	23 October 1956	21 February 1967	
Corry Tendeloo	4 June 1946 (Note: She had been an MP on behalf of Free-thinking Democratic League before the May 1946 general election.)	17 October 1956	
Ed van Thijn	23 February 1967	10 September 1981	
Ed van Thijn	16 September 1982	15 June 1983	
Joris Thijssen	31 March 2021	27 October 2023	
Wim Thomassen	31 July 1946	26 July 1948	
Jacques Tichelaar	23 May 2002	30 April 2009	
Anja Timmer	30 January 2003	29 November 2006	
Anja Timmer	20 November 2007	16 June 2010	
Frans Timmermans	19 May 1998	21 February 2007	
Frans Timmermans	17 June 2010	4 November 2012 (Note: He later served as an MP in the GroenLinks–PvdA group.)	
Varina Tjon-A-Tjen	30 January 2003	29 November 2006	
René Toussaint	6 September 1979	2 June 1986	
Maarten van Traa	3 June 1986	20 October 1997	
Jan Tuin	4 June 1946	26 July 1948	
Jan Tuin	12 August 1948	30 September 1951	
Emre Ünver	14 December 2016	14 February 2017	
Auke van Urk	5 June 1963	21 February 1967	
Joop den Uyl	6 November 1956	4 June 1963	
Joop den Uyl	23 February 1967	10 May 1973	
Joop den Uyl	8 June 1977	7 September 1977	
Joop den Uyl	16 January 1978	10 September 1981	
Joop den Uyl	16 September 1982	24 December 1987	
Koos van der Vaart	1 September 1988	16 May 1994	
Gerrit Valk	16 November 1989	16 May 1994	
Gerrit Valk	24 January 1995	22 May 2022	
Eeke van der Veen	30 November 2006	19 November 2012	
Elske ter Veld	15 September 1981	6 November 1989	
Rien van der Velde	25 October 2016	22 March 2017	
Henk Veldhoen	5 February 1980	9 June 1981	
Henk Veldhoen	15 September 1981	13 September 1989	
Jakob Vellenga	8 June 1965	21 February 1967	
Jakob Vellenga	3 September 1968	27 August 1979	
Albert Venverloo	6 November 1956	4 June 1963	
Gerdi Verbeet	11 December 2001	22 May 2002	
Gerdi Verbeet	26 July 2002	19 September 2012	
Co Verdaas	30 January 2003	29 November 2006	
Arie Verhoef	7 June 1957	19 March 1959	
Arie Verhoef	20 September 1960	4 June 1963	
Willem Vermeend	19 June 1984	21 August 1994	
Willem Vermeend	19 May 1998	2 August 1998	
Willem Vermeend	23 May 2002	25 July 2002	
Anne Vermeer	3 July 1956	4 June 1963	
Evert Vermeer	4 June 1946	29 May 1960	
Roos Vermeij	30 November 2006	22 March 2017	
Willem Vermooten	21 September 1954	21 February 1967	
Joyce Vermue	22 September 2015	22 March 2017	
Josephine Verspaget	3 June 1986	18 May 1998	
Pieter Vis	5 June 1963	21 February 1967	
Piet de Visser	15 September 1981	15 September 1982	
Piet de Visser	19 April 1983	13 September 1989	
Piet de Visser	3 May 1990	1 September 1991	
Mago Vliegenthart	17 November 1987	2 August 1998	
Marith Volp	3 September 2013	22 March 2017	
Anne Vondeling	25 July 1946	11 January 1958	
Anne Vondeling	20 March 1959	13 April 1965	
Anne Vondeling	23 February 1967	16 July 1979	
Joop Voogd	1 October 1963	9 June 1981	
Arend Voortman	11 May 1971	9 June 1981	
Kees Vorrink	4 June 1946	18 September 1954	
Hein Vos	4 June 1946	8 July 1946	
Hein Vos	27 July 1948	15 December 1948	
Henk Vos	13 December 1983	18 May 1998	
Jan Vos	20 September 2012	22 March 2017	
Mei Li Vos	1 March 2007	16 June 2010	
Mei Li Vos	20 September 2012	22 March 2017	
Henk Vredeling	6 November 1956	10 May 1973	
Ruud Vreeman	17 May 1994	17 March 1997	
Albert de Vries	20 September 2012	22 March 2017	
Klaas de Vries	28 May 1973	31 August 1988	
Klaas de Vries	23 May 2002	29 November 2006	
Maarten Vrolijk	6 November 1956	4 June 1963	
Maarten Vrolijk	23 February 1967	9 March 1972	
Harm Evert Waalkens	25 August 1998	22 May 2002	
Harm Evert Waalkens	30 January 2003	16 June 2010	
Jules de Waart	10 June 1981	2 June 1986	
Marja Wagenaar	2 December 1997	22 May 2002	
Hans Wagner	31 May 2006	29 November 2006	
Jacques Wallage	10 June 1981	6 November 1989	
Jacques Wallage	17 May 1994	25 August 1998	
Gerard van Walsum	4 June 1946	26 July 1948	
Theo Westerhout	6 November 1956	11 July 1965	
Theo Westerhout	23 February 1967	30 April 1969	
Ep Wieldraaijer	5 June 1963	10 September 1974	
Wiebe Wierda	6 November 1956	9 May 1971	
Ko Wieringa	23 February 1967	31 August 1977	
Joan Willems	4 June 1946	15 August 1970	
Jan Wilmans	17 September 1963	21 February 1967	
Tineke Witteveen-Hevinga	14 September 1989	16 May 1994	
Tineke Witteveen-Hevinga	14 September 1994	18 May 1998	
Tineke Witteveen-Hevinga	25 August 1998	22 May 2002	
Agnes Wolbert	30 November 2006	16 June 2010	
Agnes Wolbert	20 June 2010	22 March 2017	
Aleid Wolfsen	23 May 2002	31 December 2007	
Thijs Wöltgens	8 June 1977	29 August 1994	
Eisso Woltjer	17 May 1994	18 May 1998	
Joop Worrell	5 June 1974	13 September 1989	
Marijke Wuthrich-van der Vlist	12 September 1978	9 June 1981	
Loes Ypma	20 September 2012	22 March 2017	
Keklik Yücel	9 February 2010	31 May 2010	
Keklik Yücel	20 September 2012	22 March 2017	
Nancy Zeelenberg	16 September 1952	20 November 1958	
Jan van Zijl	16 November 1989	30 September 2000	
Kees Zijlstra	28 August 1979	10 June 1991	
Martin Zijlstra	16 November 1989	22 May 2022	
Louis Zimmermann	19 September 1946	9 October 1946	
Marjet van Zuijlen	18 May 1994	31 August 2000	
