= List of members of the House of Representatives of the Netherlands, 1977–1981 =

House of Representatives, 1977–1981
←	1972–1977	1981–1982	→
- Composition of the House of Representatives at the start of the term

Overview
- Legislative body: House of Representatives
- Meeting place: Binnenhof
- Term: 8 June 1977 – 9 June 1981
- Election: 1977
- Government: First Van Agt cabinet CDA (49) VVD (28)
- Opposition: CPN (2) PvdA (53) PSP (1) DS'70 (1) PPR (3) D'66 (8) GPV (1) BP (1) SGP (3)
- Members: 150
- Speaker of the House of Representatives: Anne Vondeling; Dick Dolman

Between 8 June 1977 and 9 June 1981, 202 individuals served as representatives in the House of Representatives, the 150-seat lower house of the States-General of the Netherlands. 150 representatives were elected in the 25 May 1977 general election and installed at the start of the term; 52 representatives were appointed as replacements when elected representatives resigned or went on leave. Anne Vondeling was elected President of the House and succeeded in 1979 by Dick Dolman.

During the 1977 Dutch cabinet formation the first Van Agt cabinet formed, consisting of Christian Democratic Appeal (CDA, 49 seats) and People's Party for Freedom and Democracy (VVD, 28 seats). The opposition consisted of Labour Party (PvdA, 53 seats), Democrats 66 (D'66, 8 seats), Reformed Political Party (SGP, 3 seats), Political Party of Radicals (PPR, 3 seats), Communist Party of the Netherlands (CPN, 2 seats), Reformed Political League (GPV, 1 seat), Pacifist Socialist Party (PSP, 1 seat), Farmers' Party (1 seat) and Democratic Socialists '70 (DS70, 1 seat).

== Members ==
All members are sworn in at the start of the term, even if they are not new. Assumed office in this list therefore refers to the swearing in during this term, while all members are automatically considered to have left office at the end of the term.

Name	Parliamentary group	Assumed office	Left office	Ref.
Wim Aantjes	CDA	8 June 1977	6 November 1978	
Gijs van Aardenne	VVD	8 June 1977	18 December 1977	
Harry Aarts	CDA	8 June 1977	9 June 1981	
Hette Abma	SGP	8 June 1977	9 June 1981	
Dries van Agt	CDA	8 June 1977	18 December 1977	
Wim Albers	PvdA	8 June 1977	16 July 1979	
Marius van Amelsvoort	CDA	15 September 1977	15 April 1980	
Mieke Andela-Baur	CDA	30 August 1978	9 June 1981	
Frans Andriessen	CDA	8 June 1977	17 December 1977	
Kees van den Anker	PvdA	15 September 1977	5 January 1978	
Kees van den Anker	PvdA	28 August 1979	9 June 1981	
Ton van Baars	CDA	15 April 1980	9 June 1981	
Ben Bakker	CDA	16 January 1978	9 June 1981	
Marcus Bakker	CPN	8 June 1977	9 June 1981	
Ria Beckers	PPR	8 June 1977	9 June 1981	
Relus ter Beek	PvdA	8 June 1977	9 June 1981	
Pol de Beer	VVD	8 June 1977	9 June 1981	
Marten Beinema	CDA	16 January 1978	9 June 1981	
Harry van den Bergh	PvdA	8 June 1977	9 June 1981	
Cornelis Berkhouwer	VVD	8 June 1977	3 September 1979	
Bouke Beumer	CDA	8 June 1977	16 July 1979	
Suzanne Bischoff van Heemskerck	D'66	24 January 1979	9 June 1981	
Jan Dirk Blaauw	VVD	16 January 1978	9 June 1981	
Hans de Boer	CDA	8 June 1977	9 June 1981	
Joep de Boer	CDA	8 June 1977	9 June 1981	
Jaap Boersma	CDA	8 June 1977	7 September 1977 (Note: Had to leave the House, because membership of the House could only be combined for three months with membership of the cabinet.)	
Jaap Boersma	CDA	16 January 1978	31 October 1978	
Frits Bolkestein	VVD	16 January 1978	9 June 1981	
Rie de Boois	PvdA	8 June 1977	9 June 1981	
Fred Borgman	CDA	5 April 1978	9 June 1981	
Bets Borm-Luijkx	CDA	6 May 1980	9 June 1981	
Reinier Braams	VVD	8 June 1977	9 June 1981	
Gerrit Braks	CDA	8 June 1977	5 March 1980	
Wiel Bremen	CDA	8 June 1977	9 June 1981	
Laurens Jan Brinkhorst	D'66	8 June 1977	9 June 1981	
Hans van den Broek	CDA	8 June 1977	9 June 1981	
Jan Buikema	CDA	28 August 1979	9 June 1981	
Vincent van der Burg	CDA	1 November 1979	9 June 1981	
Flip Buurmeijer	PvdA	28 August 1979	9 June 1981	
Frits Castricum	PvdA	8 June 1977	9 June 1981	
Dien Cornelissen	CDA	8 June 1977	9 June 1981	
Pam Cornelissen	CDA	8 June 1977	9 June 1981	
Henk Couprie	CDA	24 January 1979	9 June 1981	
Gerrit van Dam	CDA	8 June 1977	9 June 1981	
Marcel van Dam	PvdA	8 June 1977	9 June 1981	
Piet Dankert	PvdA	8 June 1977	9 June 1981	
Dick Dees	VVD	8 June 1977	9 June 1981	
Wim Deetman	CDA	16 January 1978	9 June 1981	
Kees van Dijk	CDA	8 June 1977	9 June 1981	
Stef Dijkman	CDA	8 June 1977	9 June 1981	
Cor van Dis jr.	SGP	8 June 1977	9 June 1981	
Jaap van der Doef	PvdA	8 June 1977	9 June 1981	
Dick Dolman	PvdA	8 June 1977	9 June 1981	
Willem Drees jr.	DS'70	8 June 1977	19 August 1977 (Note: Left the House after the disappointing election result under his leadership.)	
Herman Drenth	PvdA	8 June 1977	5 September 1979	
Dirk Duinker	PvdA	15 September 1977	11 January 1978	
Dirk Duinker	PvdA	28 June 1978	9 June 1981	
Wim Duisenberg	PvdA	8 June 1977	7 September 1977	
Wim Duisenberg	PvdA	16 January 1978	27 June 1978	
Wim van Eekelen	VVD	8 June 1977	18 January 1978	
Maarten Engwirda	D'66	8 June 1977	9 June 1981	
Meiny Epema-Brugman	PvdA	8 June 1977	9 June 1981	
Broos van Erp	VVD	16 January 1978	9 June 1981	
Albert-Jan Evenhuis	VVD	8 June 1977	9 June 1981	
Hanske Evenhuis-van Essen	CDA	8 June 1977	9 June 1981	
Huib Eversdijk	CDA	8 June 1977	9 June 1981	
Sytze Faber	CDA	8 June 1977	9 June 1981	
Ton Frinking	CDA	22 December 1977	9 June 1981	
Til Gardeniers-Berendsen	CDA	8 June 1977	18 December 1977	
Gerrit Gerritse	CDA	16 January 1978	9 June 1981	
Aart Geurtsen	VVD	8 June 1977	9 June 1981	
Nell Ginjaar-Maas	VVD	8 June 1977	9 June 1981	
Arie de Graaf	PvdA	8 June 1977	9 June 1981	
Hans Gualthérie van Weezel	CDA	8 June 1977	9 June 1981	
Frans van der Gun	CDA	8 June 1977	16 July 1979	
Ineke Haas-Berger	PvdA	8 June 1977	9 June 1981	
Henk de Hamer	PvdA	1 September 1977	9 June 1981	
Henk Hartmeijer	PvdA	8 June 1977	9 June 1981	
Ted Hazekamp	CDA	8 June 1977	27 December 1977	
Annemieke van Heel-Kasteel	CDA	28 August 1979	9 June 1981	
Arie van der Hek	PvdA	8 June 1977	9 June 1981	
Jo Hendriks	CDA	8 June 1977	7 September 1977	
Ben Hennekam	CDA	15 February 1978	9 June 1981	
Loek Hermans	VVD	8 June 1977	9 June 1981	
Ad Hermes	CDA	8 June 1977	8 January 1978	
Ben Hermsen	CDA	15 September 1977	9 June 1981	
Henk Hoekstra	CPN	8 June 1977	1 December 1977	
Jan van Houwelingen	CDA	8 June 1977	9 June 1981	
Michel van Hulten	PPR	8 June 1977	7 September 1977	
Joost van Iersel	CDA	28 August 1979	9 June 1981	
Wijnie Jabaaij	PvdA	15 September 1977	30 December 1977	
Wijnie Jabaaij	PvdA	1 March 1979	9 June 1981	
Huub Jacobse	VVD	8 June 1977	9 June 1981	
Leo Jansen	PPR	8 June 1977	9 June 1981	
Theo Joekes	VVD	8 June 1977	9 June 1981	
Flip de Kam	PvdA	15 September 1977	5 January 1978	
Annelien Kappeyne van de Coppello	VVD	8 June 1977	9 June 1981	
Wim Keja	VVD	8 June 1977	9 June 1981	
Jos van Kemenade	PvdA	8 June 1977	7 September 1977	
Jos van Kemenade	PvdA	16 January 1978	9 June 1981	
Heine Keuning	PvdA	28 August 1979	9 June 1981	
Ger Klein	PvdA	8 June 1977	4 February 1980	
Cor Kleisterlee jr.	CDA	8 June 1977	31 October 1979	
Henk Knol	PvdA	8 June 1977	9 June 1981	
Hendrik Koekoek	BP	8 June 1977	9 June 1981	
Kees Kolthoff	PvdA	8 June 1977	9 June 1981	
Hans Kombrink	PvdA	8 June 1977	9 June 1981	
Henk Koning	VVD	8 June 1977	27 December 1977	
Jan de Koning	CDA	8 June 1977	18 December 1977	
Martin Konings	PvdA	8 June 1977	9 June 1981	
Rudolf de Korte	VVD	22 December 1977	9 June 1981	
Virginie Korte-van Hemel	CDA	15 September 1977	9 June 1981	
Aad Kosto	PvdA	8 June 1977	9 June 1981	
Jeltien Kraaijeveld-Wouters	CDA	8 June 1977	27 December 1977	
Anneke Krijnen	VVD	22 December 1977	9 June 1981	
Neelie Kroes	VVD	8 June 1977	27 December 1977	
Annie Krouwel-Vlam	PvdA	8 June 1977	16 July 1979	
Roelof Kruisinga	CDA	8 June 1977	18 December 1977	
Willem de Kwaadsteniet	CDA	15 September 1977	9 June 1981	
Cees Laban	PvdA	8 June 1977	4 September 1977 (Note: Died.)	
Ineke Lambers-Hacquebard	D'66	8 June 1977	9 June 1981	
Siepie Langedijk-de Jong	PvdA	8 June 1977	9 June 1981	
Ad Lansink	CDA	8 June 1977	9 June 1981	
Herman Lauxtermann	VVD	8 June 1977	9 June 1981	
Hannie van Leeuwen	CDA	8 June 1977	31 maart 1978	
Gerard van Leijenhorst	CDA	8 June 1977	9 June 1981	
Bram van der Lek	PSP	8 June 1977	15 January 1978	
René van der Linden	CDA	8 June 1977	9 June 1981	
Ruud Lubbers	CDA	8 June 1977	7 September 1977	
Ruud Lubbers	CDA	22 December 1977	9 June 1981	
Wim Mateman	CDA	28 August 1979	9 June 1981	
Durk van der Mei	CDA	8 June 1977	27 December 1977	
Wim Meijer	PvdA	8 June 1977	9 June 1981	
Chel Mertens	D'66	8 June 1977	9 June 1981	
Adriaan van Mierlo	PvdA	6 October 1977	4 January 1978	
Henk Molleman	PvdA	8 June 1977	28 February 1979	
Joep Mommersteeg	CDA	22 December 1977	9 June 1981	
Frans Moor	PvdA	15 September 1977	9 June 1981	
Gerard van Muiden	CDA	8 June 1977	9 June 1981	
Ina Müller-van Ast	PvdA	8 June 1977	9 June 1981	
Frits Niessen	PvdA	6 October 1977	5 January 1978	
Frits Niessen	PvdA	27 August 1980	9 June 1981	
Ruud Nijhof	DS'70	24 August 1977	9 June 1981	
Ed Nijpels	VVD	8 June 1977	9 June 1981	
Harrij Notenboom	CDA	8 June 1977	16 July 1979	
Erwin Nypels	D'66	8 June 1977	9 June 1981	
David van Ooijen	PvdA	8 June 1977	9 June 1981	
Schelto Patijn	PvdA	8 June 1977	9 June 1981	
Walter Paulis	CDA	7 October 1980	9 June 1981	
Rinus Peijnenburg	CDA	8 June 1977	18 December 1977	
Ad Ploeg	VVD	8 June 1977	9 June 1981	
Stan Poppe	PvdA	8 June 1977	9 June 1981	
Frits Portheine	VVD	8 June 1977	9 June 1981	
Jan Pronk	PvdA	8 June 1977	7 September 1977	
Jan Pronk	PvdA	16 January 1978	17 August 1980	
Len Rempt-Halmmans de Jongh	VVD	11 September 1979	9 June 1981	
Hessel Rienks	PvdA	8 June 1977	9 June 1981	
Koos Rietkerk	VVD	8 June 1977	9 June 1981	
Peter Roels	PvdA	8 June 1977	9 June 1981	
Hein Roethof	PvdA	8 June 1977	9 June 1981	
Martin van Rooijen	CDA	1 November 1977	31 August 1980	
Henk van Rossum	SGP	8 June 1977	9 June 1981	
Nora Salomons	PvdA	8 June 1977	9 June 1981	
Piet van der Sanden	CDA	8 June 1977	9 June 1981	
Ge Schaapman	PvdA	8 June 1977	9 June 1981	
Jan Schaefer	PvdA	8 June 1977	5 September 1978	
Maarten Schakel sr.	CDA	8 June 1977	9 June 1981	
Jaap Scherpenhuizen	VVD	8 June 1977	9 June 1981	
Jan Nico Scholten	CDA	8 June 1977	9 June 1981	
Harry Seijben	CDA	16 January 1978	28 July 1978	
Fred van der Spek	PSP	16 January 1978	9 June 1981	
Bonno Spieker	PvdA	8 June 1977	9 June 1981	
Fons van der Stee	CDA	8 June 1977	7 September 1977	
Bram Stemerdink	PvdA	14 June 1977	13 September 1977	
Bram Stemerdink	PvdA	16 January 1978	9 June 1981	
Max van der Stoel	PvdA	8 June 1977	7 September 1977	
Max van der Stoel	PvdA	16 January 1978	9 June 1981	
Piet Stoffelen	PvdA	8 June 1977	9 June 1981	
Jan Terlouw	D'66	8 June 1977	9 June 1981	
Erica Terpstra	VVD	8 June 1977	9 June 1981	
Ed van Thijn	PvdA	8 June 1977	9 June 1981	
Teun Tolman	CDA	8 June 1977	16 July 1979	
René Toussaint	PvdA	6 September 1979	9 June 1981	
Max Tripels	VVD	19 January 1978	9 June 1981	
Dany Tuijnman	VVD	8 June 1977	18 December 1977	
Joop den Uyl	PvdA	8 June 1977	7 September 1977	
Joop den Uyl	PvdA	16 January 1978	9 June 1981	
Els Veder-Smit	VVD	8 June 1977	2 January 1978	
Antoon Veerman	CDA	8 June 1977	9 June 1981	
Henk Veldhoen	PvdA	5 February 1980	9 June 1981	
Jacob Vellenga	PvdA	8 June 1977	27 August 1979	
Jan van de Ven	VVD	8 June 1977	9 June 1981	
Bart Verbrugh	GPV	8 June 1977	9 June 1981	
Anne Vondeling	PvdA	8 June 1977	16 July 1979	
Jan de Voogd	VVD	22 December 1977	9 June 1981	
Joop Voogd	PvdA	8 June 1977	9 June 1981	
Arend Voortman	PvdA	8 June 1977	9 June 1981	
Bert de Vries	CDA	21 November 1978	9 June 1981	
Klaas de Vries	PvdA	8 June 1977	9 June 1981	
Harry Waalkens	VVD	8 June 1977	9 June 1981	
Henk Waltmans	PPR	15 September 1977	9 June 1981	
Steef Weijers	CDA	8 June 1977	9 June 1981	
Elida Wessel-Tuinstra	D'66	8 June 1977	9 June 1981	
Tjerk Westerterp	CDA	8 June 1977	7 September 1977	
Tjerk Westerterp	CDA	22 December 1977	14 February 1978	
Hans Wiegel	VVD	8 June 1977	18 December 1977	
Ko Wierenga	PvdA	8 June 1977	31 August 1977 (Note: Left the House to become mayor of Enschede.)	
Herman Wisselink	CDA	8 June 1977	9 June 1981	
Joop Wolff	CPN	22 December 1977	9 June 1981	
Thijs Wöltgens	PvdA	8 June 1977	9 June 1981	
Joop Worrell	PvdA	8 June 1977	9 June 1981	
Marijke Wuthrich-van der Vlist	PvdA	12 September 1978	9 June 1981	
Henk Zeevalking	D'66	8 June 1977	23 January 1979	
Piet van Zeil	CDA	8 June 1977	9 June 1981	
Kees Zijlstra	PvdA	28 August 1979	9 June 1981	
