= Van Ooijen =

Van Ooijen or Van Ooyen is a Dutch toponymic surname meaning "from/of Ooijen". The Middle Dutch word Ooije or Oije signified a (waterlogged) meadow in a river bend. Several specific settlements are named Ooij, Ooijen or Oijen. Variants are Van Oijen, Van Ooyen, and Van Oyen. People with the surname include:

Van Ooijen / Van Ooyen

- David van Ooijen (1939–2006), Dutch Roman Catholic priest and politician
- Maarten van Ooijen (born 1990), Dutch politician
- Peter van Ooijen (born 1992), Dutch football midfielder
- Romy van Ooijen (born 1971), Dutch pop singer
- Willi van Ooyen (born 1947), German Linke Party politician

Van Oijen / Van Oyen

- Alisa Van Oijen (born 1992), Australian racing cyclist
- Cornelius van Oyen (1886–1954), German sports shooter
- Ludolph Hendrik van Oyen (1889–1953), Dutch Chief of Staff of the Royal Netherlands East Indies Army
