= Pauline Smeets =

Dutch politician

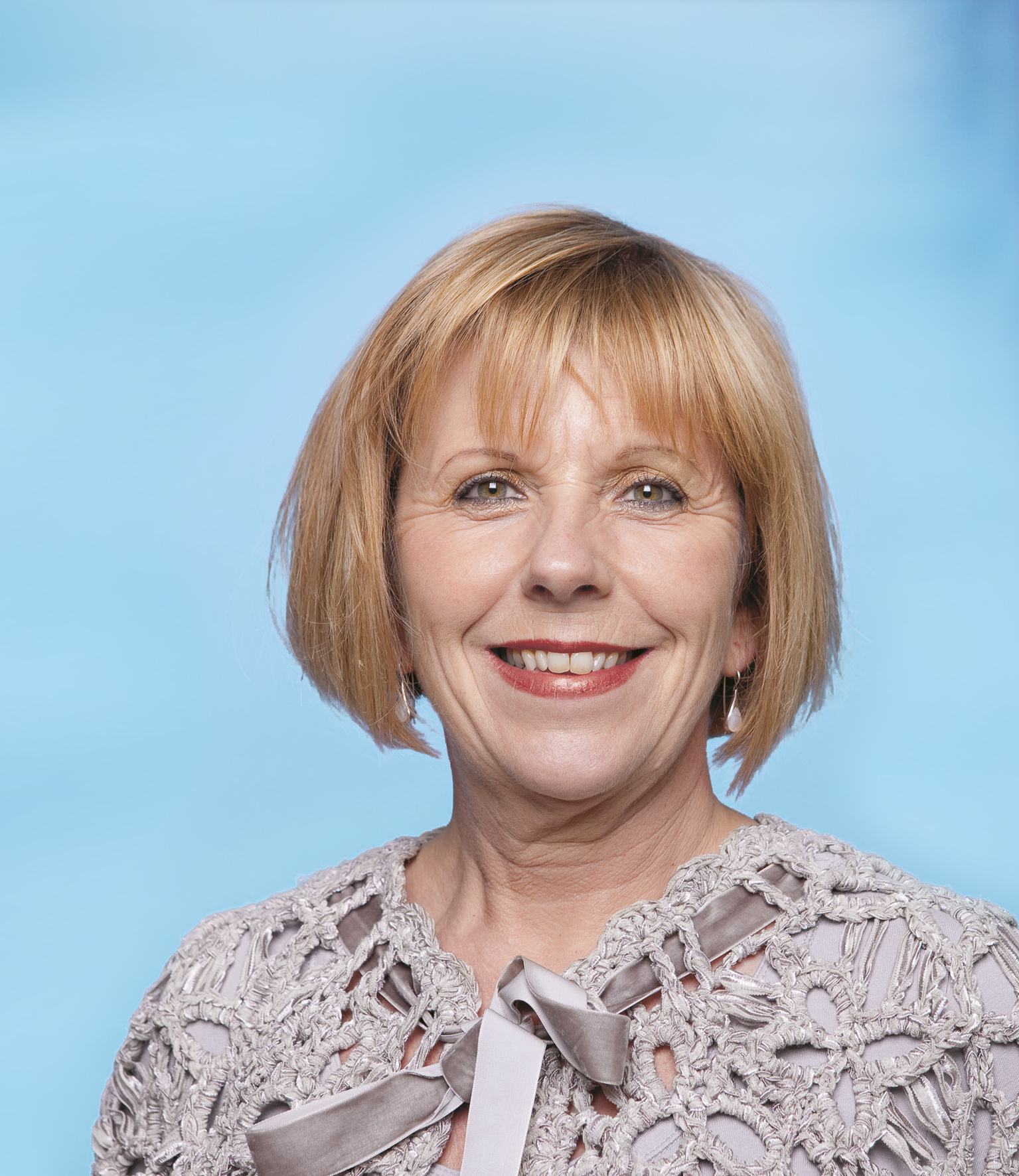
- P.E. Smeets

Member of the House of Representatives
- In office 30 January 2003 – 19 September 2012

Personal details
- Born: 10 February 1959 (age 67) Heerlen
- Party: Labour Party
- Occupation: Politician

Pauline Elisabeth Smeets (born 10 February 1959, in Heerlen) is a former Dutch politician. As a member of the Labour Party (Partij van de Arbeid) she was an MP from 30 January 2003 to 19 September 2012. She focused on matters of small and medium enterprises, corporate social responsibility, tourism, recreation and regional economic policy.

== Honours ==
- Knight of the Order of Orange Nassau (September 19, 2012)
