= Ooij =

Ooij may refer to:

Places in the province of Gelderland, the Netherlands:

- Ooij, Berg en Dal, in the municipality of Berg en Dal
- Ooij, Neder-Betuwe, in the municipality of Neder-Betuwe
- Ooij, Zevenaar, in the municipality of Zevenaar
