= Ton van Baars =

Dutch politician (1922–2018)

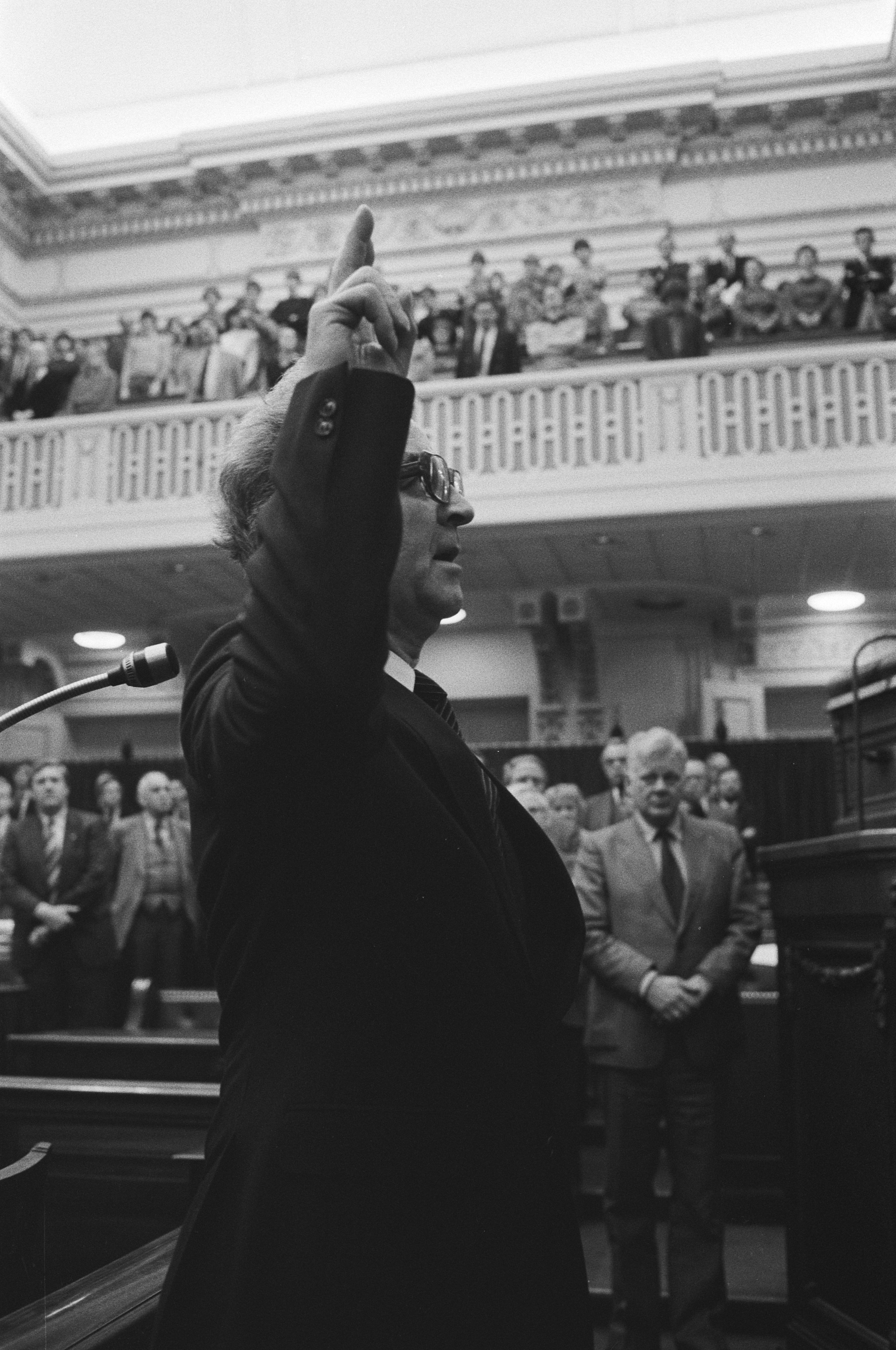
- Van Baars in 1982

Member of the House of Representatives
- In office 19 January 1982 – 3 June 1986
- In office 15 April 1980 – 10 June 1981

Personal details
- Born: Antonius Wilhelmus Bernardus van Baars; 6 March 1922 Hengelo, Netherlands
- Died: 8 November 2018 (aged 96) Eindhoven, Netherlands
- Party: Christian Democratic Appeal (since 1980)
- Other political affiliations: Catholic People's Party (until 1980)

Antonius Wilhelmus Bernardus "Ton" van Baars (6 March 1922 – 8 November 2018) was a Dutch politician. He served as a member of the House of Representatives from 1980 to 1981, and again from 1982 to 1986. Van Baars was a member of the Catholic People's Party until 11 October 1980, when he switched to the newly-formed Christian Democratic Appeal. He died in Eindhoven on 8 November 2018, at the age of 96.
