= Eeke van der Veen =

Dutch politician

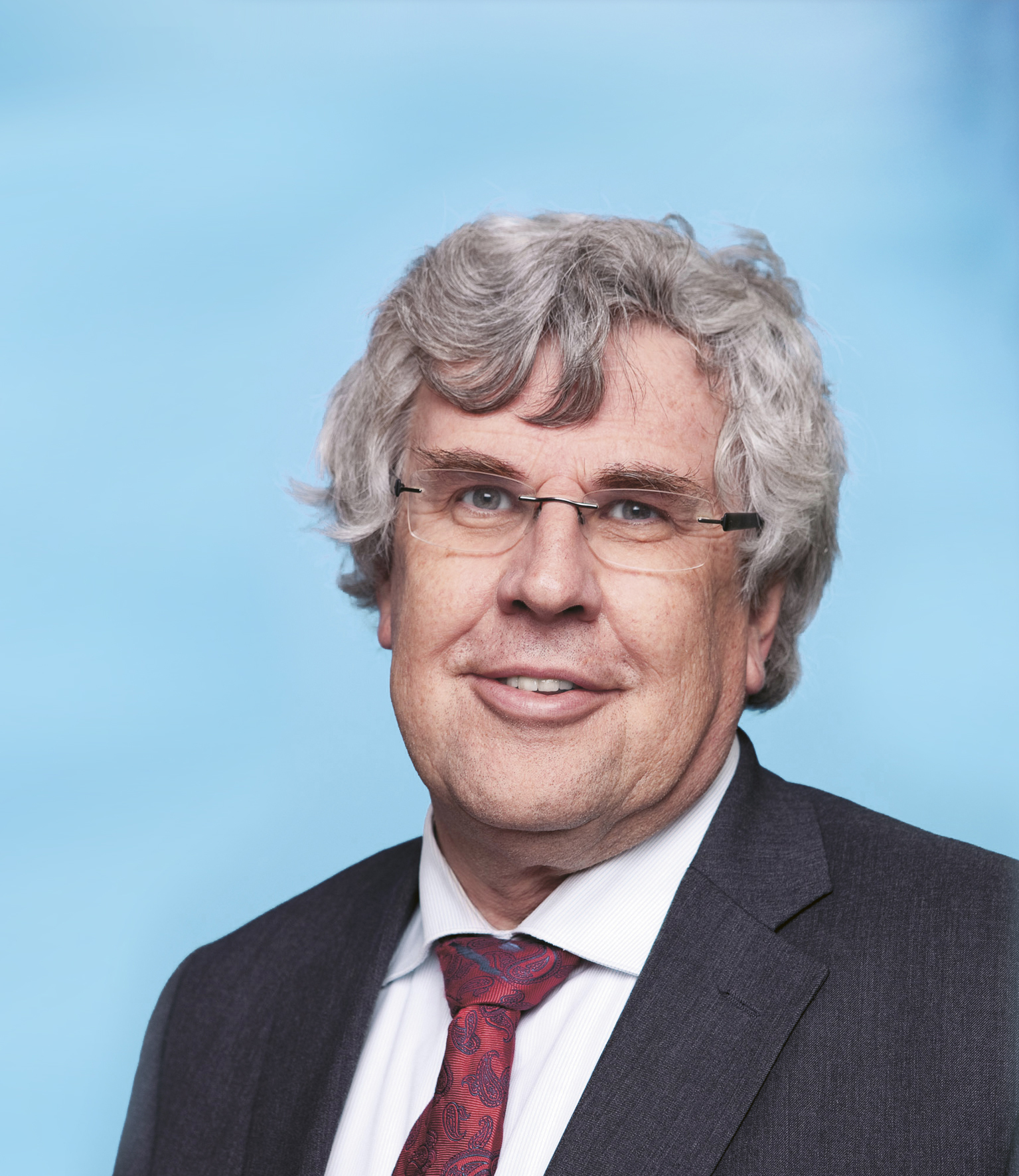
E. van der Veen

Eelke (Eeke) van der Veen (born 21 June 1946 in Wûnseradiel) is a former Dutch politician. As a member of the Labour Party he was an MP from 30 November 2006 to 19 September 2012. He focused on matters of public health.
