= Joep de Boer =

Dutch politician (1924–2006)

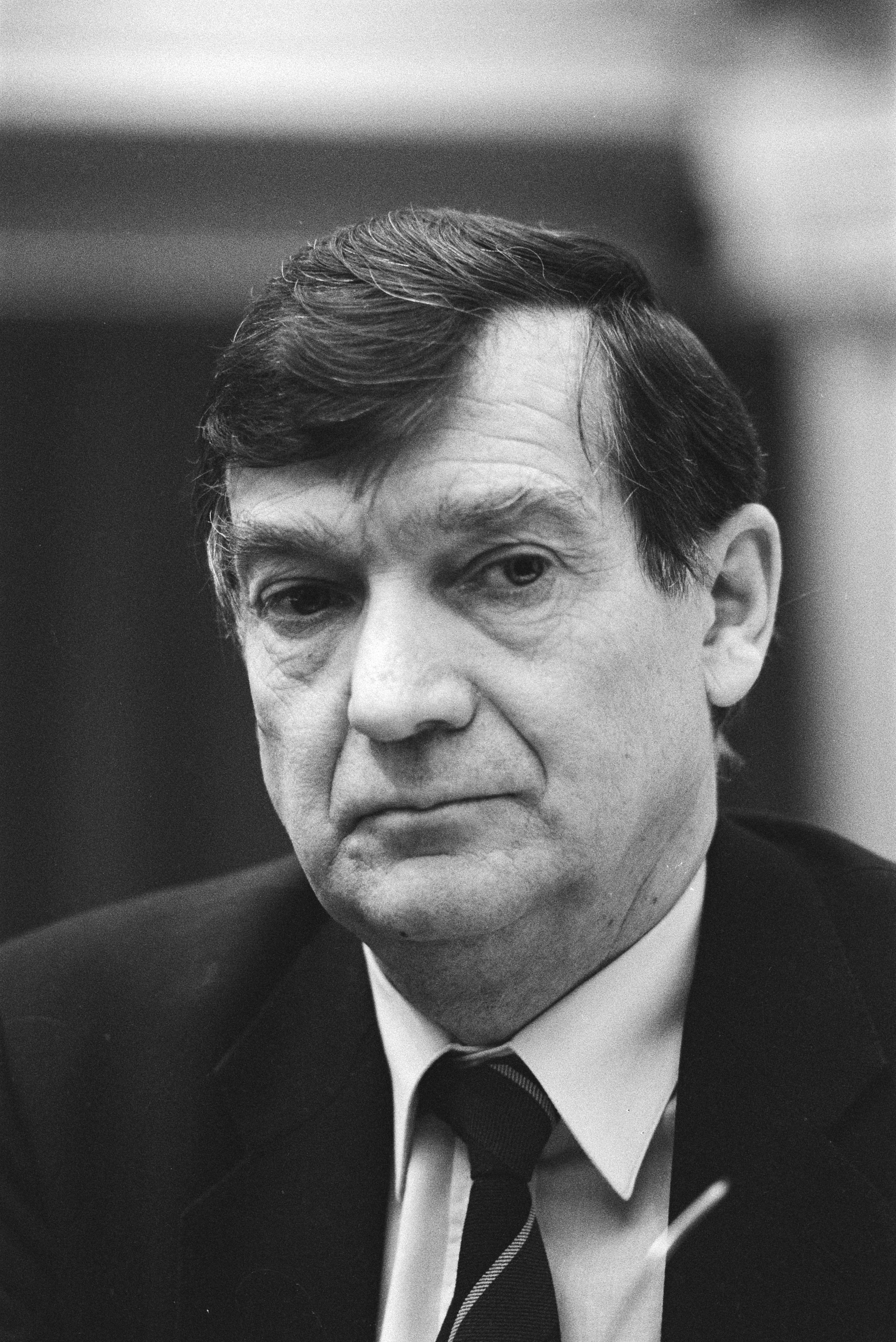
- De Boer in 1984

Member of the House of Representatives
- In office 8 June 1977 – 14 September 1989

Personal details
- Born: Joseph Joannes Petrus de Boer; 16 November 1924 Venlo, Netherlands
- Died: 5 May 2006 (aged 81) Lisse, Netherlands
- Party: Christian Democratic Appeal (1980–2006)
- Other political affiliations: Catholic People's Party (until 1980)

Joseph Joannes Petrus de Boer (16 November 1924 – 5 May 2006) was a Dutch politician. From 1977 to 1989, he served as a member of the House of Representatives for the Christian Democratic Appeal from 1977 to 1980, and the Catholic People's Party from 1980.
