= Trees Lemaire =

Dutch journalist and politician (1919–1998)

- Trees Lemaire in 1962

Member of the House of Representatives
- In office 28 March 1957 – 17 September 1963

Personal details
- Born: Therèse Finette Lemaire; 15 January 1919 Amsterdam, Netherlands
- Died: 10 December 1998 (aged 79) Amsterdam, Netherlands
- Party: PvdA
- Education: University of Amsterdam

Therèse Finette "Trees" Lemaire (15 January 1919 – 10 December 1989) was a Dutch journalist and politician. She was a member of the Dutch House of Representatives for the Labour Party (PvdA) from 1957 to 1963.

== Biography ==
Lemaire was born in Amsterdam in 1919 to Matthias Ludovicus Joannes Lemaire and Mietje de Vries. Both of her parents were teachers, but her father later decided to become an art dealer. The family moved to Rotterdam in 1925, to The Hague three years later, and then returned to Amsterdam in 1933. Trees Lemaire completed secondary school and then studied law at the Municipal University of Amsterdam from 1937 to 1943.

During the Second World War, Lemaire worked for the Persoonsbewijzen Centrale (PBC), which made false identity cards for the Dutch resistance, and distributed the illegal newspaper Het Parool. She was arrested during a check in 1943 but was released after a German client of her father intervened. After the war, she went to work for the legalized Het Parool as an editor, and later as head of the socio-economic department. She also wrote about fashion for the newspaper.

Lemaire was a candidate in the 1956 Dutch general election, but was not placed high enough on the list of candidates to be elected. She became an MP on March 28, 1957, following the death of Kees ten Hagen. As an MP, she focused primarily on social affairs and public housing. She left parliament in 1963 because she felt her efforts were not leading to any tangible results.

In September 1963, Lemaire became head of department at the public broadcasting association VARA. In 1966, she became secretary of its programming advisory concil. A year later, she became a deputy Crown member of the Social and Economic Council (SER). Around the same time, she also started working for her father's art dealership. Together with her brother, she took over the dealership after their father's death, making her one of the first female art dealers in the Netherlands. Lemaire also held administrative positions at the Reclameraad and the daily newspaper Het Vrije Volk, among others. In 1988 she was appointed an Officer in the Order of Orange-Nassau for her services to the SER, where she left a year later.

On December 10, 1998, Lemaire died of a brain tumor.
