= Agnes Wolbert =

Dutch politician (1958–2025)

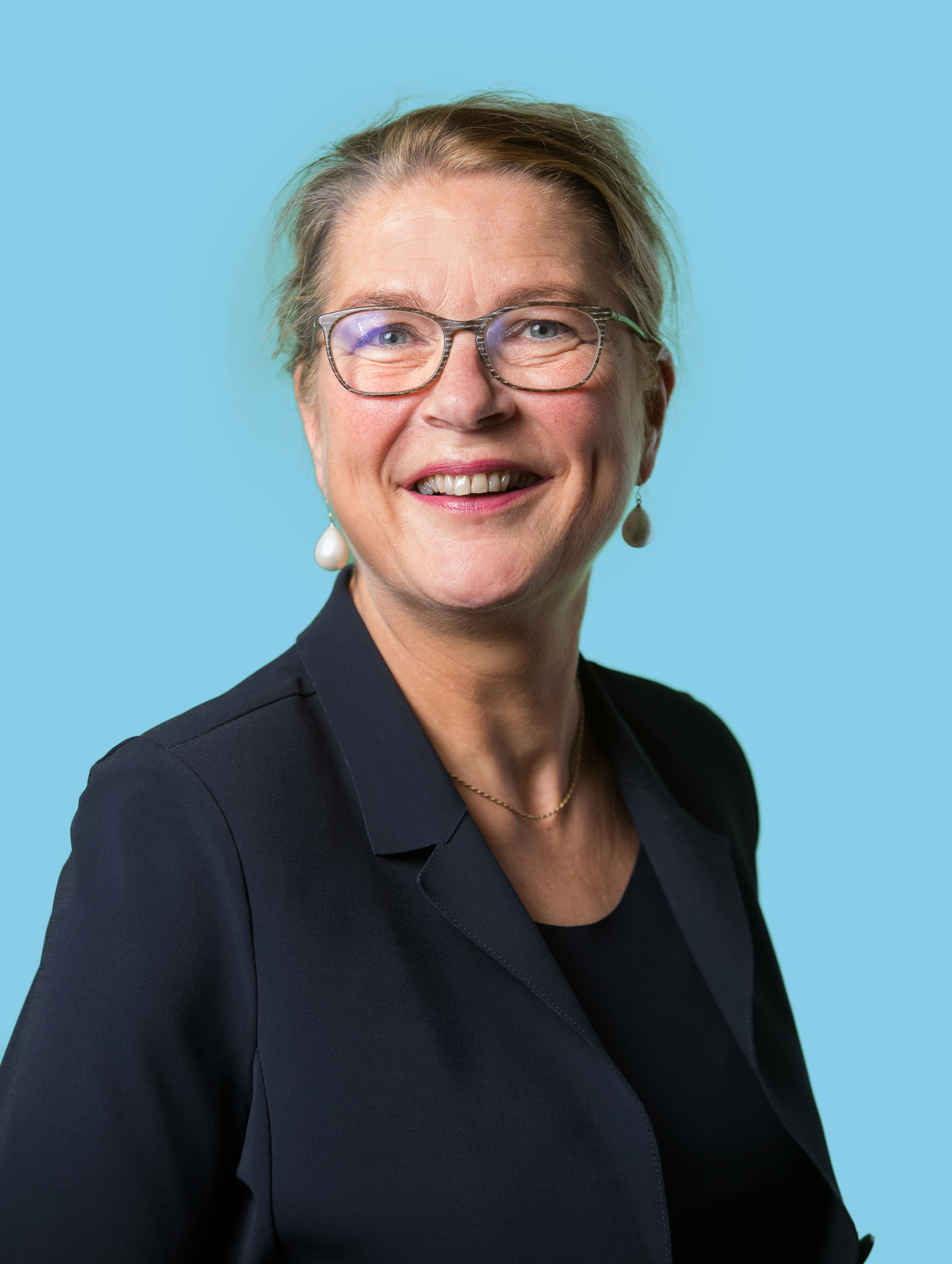
- Wolbert in 2016

Member of the House of Representatives
- In office 30 November 2006 – 23 March 2017

Personal details
- Born: 10 August 1958 Oldenzaal, Netherlands
- Died: 13 October 2025 (aged 67) Zutphen, Netherlands
- Party: Labour Party
- Occupation: Politician

Agnes Geziena Wolbert (20 August 1958 – 13 October 2025) was a Dutch politician. As a member of the Labour Party (Partij van de Arbeid) she was an MP between 30 November 2006 and 23 March 2017. She focused on matters of senior citizen policy, normal and special health care, and home care.

Wolbert died on 13 October 2025, at the age of 67.
