= Ben Bakker =

Dutch politician (born 1931)

Member of the House of Representatives
- In office 16 January 1978 – 10 June 1981

Alderman of Linschoten
- In office 1 September 1974 – 6 September 1978

Member of the Linschoten municipal council
- In office 1 September 1974 – 1 July 1979

Personal details
- Born: Bernhard Bakker; 2 August 1931 (age 94) De Waal, Netherlands
- Party: Christian Democratic Appeal (since 1980)
- Other political affiliations: Catholic People's Party (1974–1980)

Bernhard Bakker (born 2 August 1931) is a Dutch politician who served as a member of the House of Representatives from 1978 to 1981. He was a member of the Catholic People's Party until 1980, when he joined the newly-formed Christian Democratic Appeal.
