= Loes Ypma =

Dutch politician

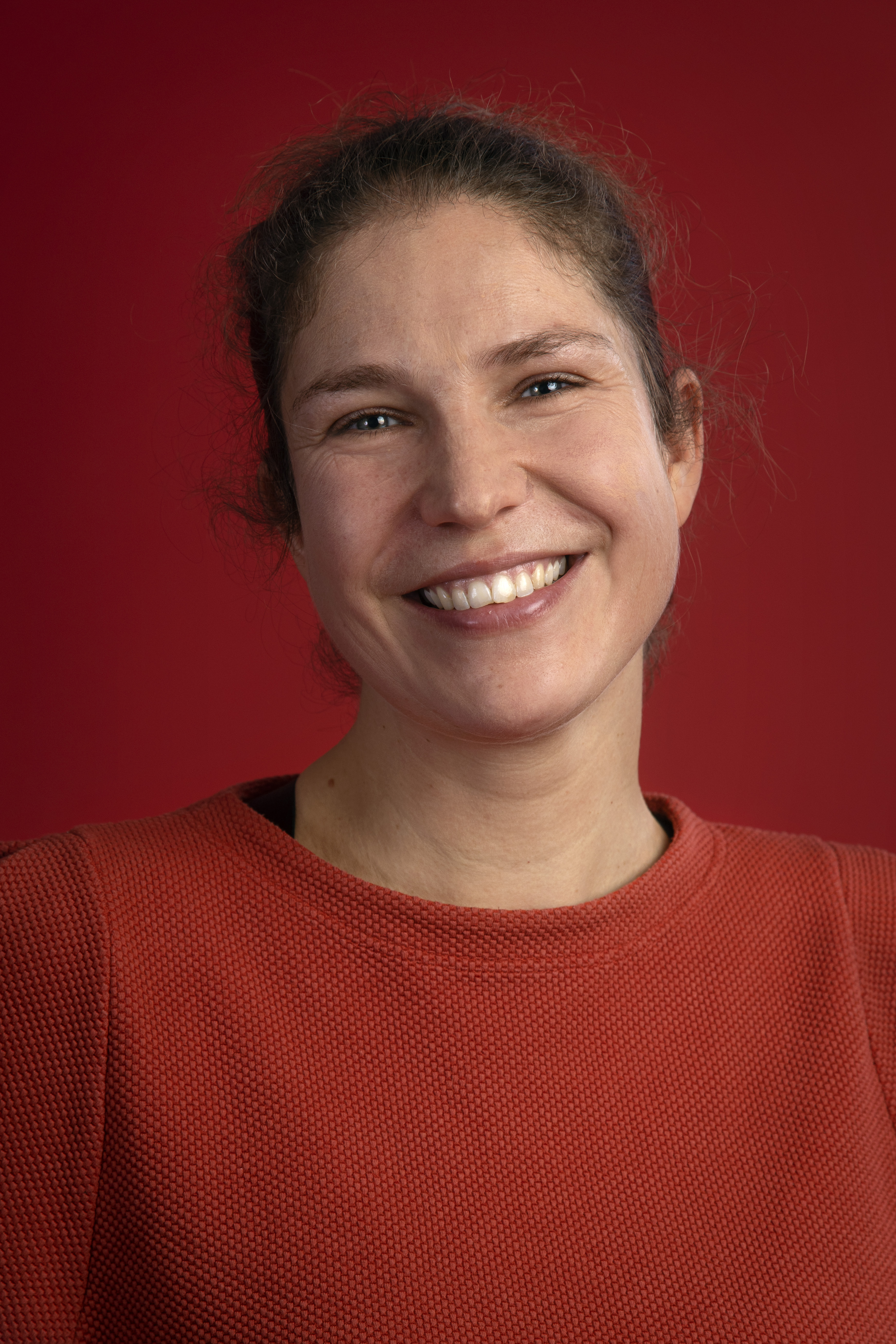

Member of the House of Representatives
- In office 20 September 2012 – 23 March 2017

Personal details
- Born: 20 February 1980 (age 46) Rotterdam, Netherlands
- Party: Labour Party (PvdA)

Loes Ypma (Dutch pronunciation: [lus ˈipmaː]; born 20 February 1980) is a Dutch politician. As a member of the Labour Party (Partij van de Arbeid) she was an MP between 20 September 2012 and 23 March 2017. Previously she was a member of the municipal council of Woerden from 2001 to 2007 and subsequently an alderman of the same municipality from 2007 to 2012.
