= Patricia Linhard =

Dutch politician

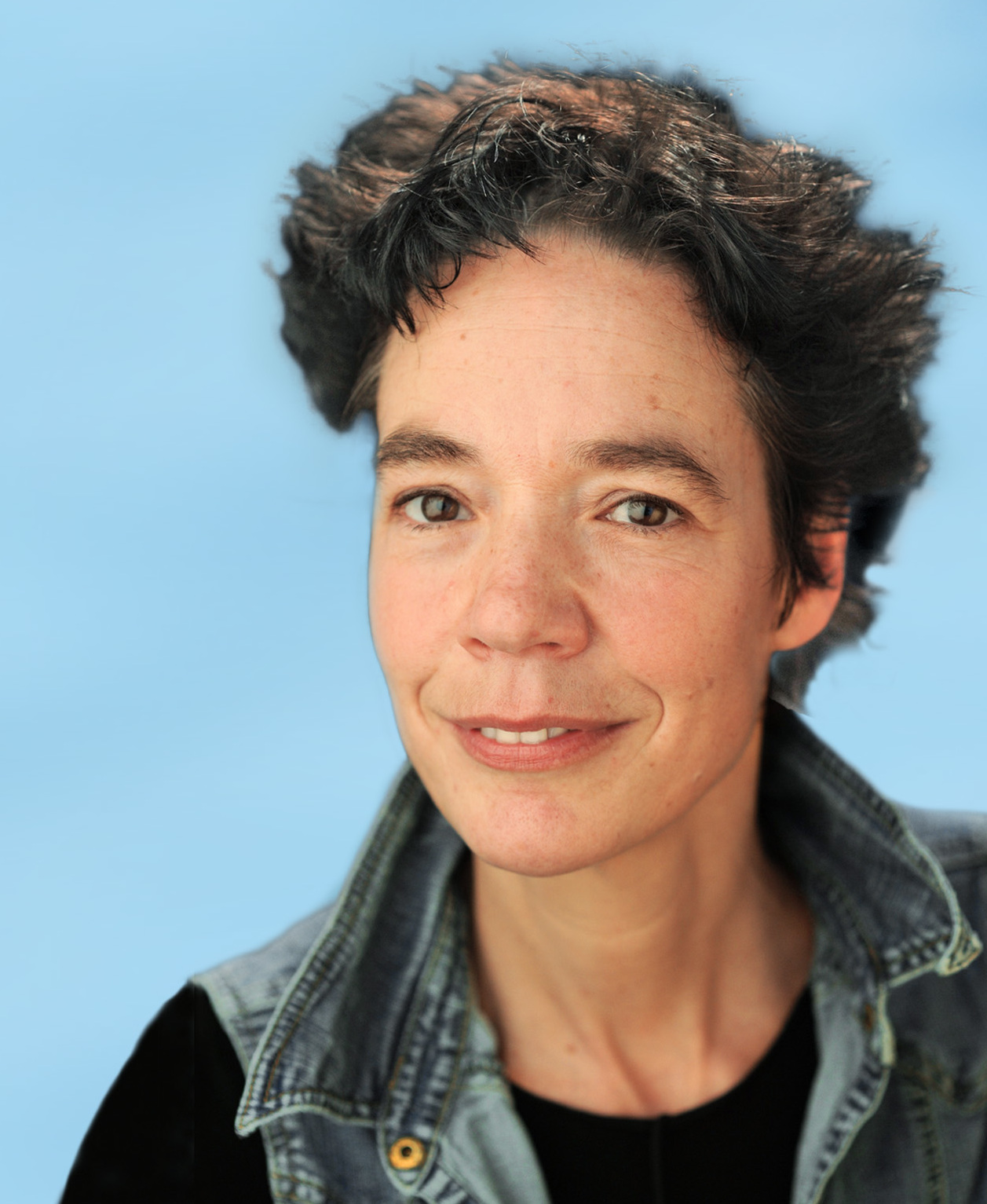

Member of the House of Representatives
- In office 12 May 2009 – 17 June 2010

Personal details
- Born: 17 April 1957 (age 69) Amsterdam, Netherlands
- Party: Labour
- Education: University of Amsterdam

Patricia Linhard (born 17 April 1957) is a Dutch politician. She was a member of the House of Representatives for the Labour Party from 12 May 2009 to 17 June 2010.

Linhard attended the Cartesius Lyceum in Amsterdam and then studied economics at the University of Amsterdam. She did not complete her studies. She worked at De Bijenkorf and, from 1979, owned a women's fashion store on Amsterdam's Van Baerlestraat, which she took over from her father. She was active in development work and served as a board member and chair of a Ondernemersvereniging.

In 2005, she joined the Labour Party (PvdA). She was part of the party's political forum. In the 2006 Dutch general election, she was 44th on the candidate list, too low to be directly elected. On 22 May 2009, she finally entered parliament, succeeding Jacques Tichelaar , who left the House to become Queen's Commissioner in Drenthe.
