= Harry van den Bergh =

Dutch politician (1942–2020)

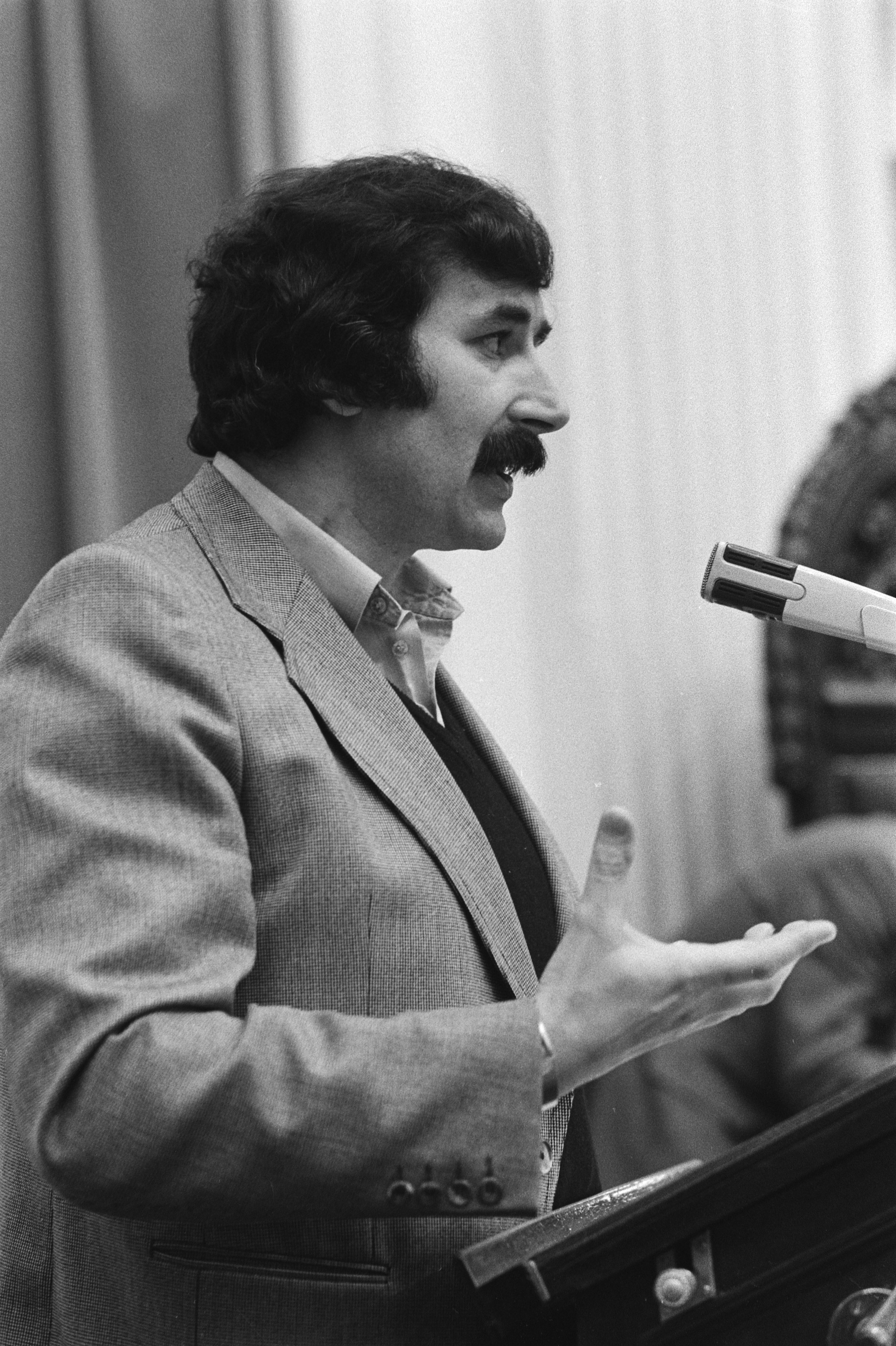
- Harry van den Bergh in 1981

Member of the House of Representatives of the Netherlands
- In office 8 June 1977 – 3 September 1987

Personal details
- Born: Harry Jacob van den Bergh; 1 April 1942 Amsterdam, Netherlands
- Died: 20 March 2020 (aged 77) Amstelveen, Netherlands
- Party: Labour Party
- Education: University of Amsterdam (Bachelor of Social Science, Master of Social Science)
- Occupation: Politician; Civil servant Management consultant Corporate director Activist

Harry Jacob van den Bergh (1 April 1942 – 20 March 2020) was a Dutch politician of the Labour Party (PvdA). In 1977–1987 van den Bergh was a member of the lower house. Later he became a councilor in Amstelveen.

He was a graduate of the University of Amsterdam in political and social science.
