= Wim Albers =

Dutch politician (1920–2009)

Member of the European Parliament
- In office 17 July 1979 – 24 July 1984
- Constituency: Netherlands
- In office 3 October 1974 – 17 July 1979

Member of the House of Representatives
- In office 28 August 1973 – 17 July 1979

Personal details
- Born: Willem Albers; 30 October 1920; Rotterdam, Netherlands
- Died: 30 December 2009 (aged 89); Warnsveld, Netherlands
- Political party: Labour Party

Willem Albers (30 October 1920 – 30 December 2009) was a Dutch politician. He served as a member of the European Parliament from 1974 to 1979 and again from 1979 to 1984 after the first European Parliament election. He also served in the House of Representatives from 1973 to 1979. He was a member of the Labour Party.
