= Hessel Rienks =

Dutch politician

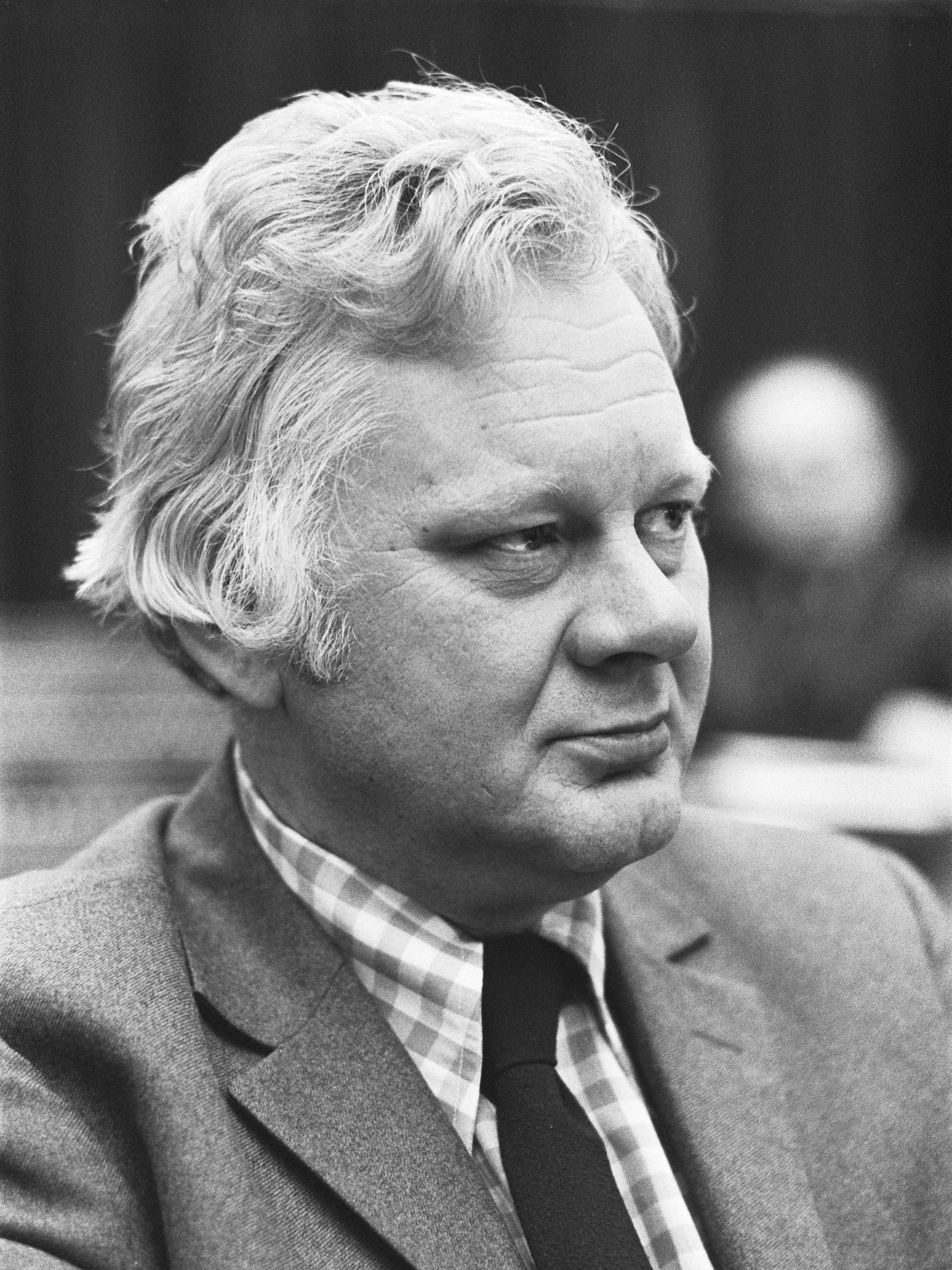
- Hessel Rienks in 1977

Member of the House of Representatives
- In office 11 September 1974 – 14 September 1989

Personal details
- Born: 4 March 1932 Weidum, Netherlands
- Died: 23 December 2014 (aged 82) Zwolle, Netherlands
- Party: Labour Party
- Education: University of Amsterdam

Hessel Rienks (4 March 1932 – 23 December 2014) was a Dutch politician. He was a member of the House of Representatives of the Netherlands between 1974 and 1989 for the Labour Party.

== Career ==
Rienks was born on 4 March 1932 in Weidum; he went to the Hogere Burgerschool in Zwolle. Rienks went on to study economy at the University of Amsterdam, graduating in 1957. Between 1960 and 1963 he worked as an assistant at a chemical company. In 1963 he started working for the municipality of Zwolle, heading the economic department of the public works office for eleven years.

In 1974 Rienks was elected to the House of Representatives for the Labour Party. As representative he concerned himself with spatial planning, regional economy policies and finances of lower government. Together with Frits Castricum he promoted the cause of the Hanzelijn-railway. He also led the parliamentary commission on the building of new housing for the House of Representatives. His membership of the House ended on 14 September 1989. The same month he became director of the Instituut Ziektekostenvoorziening Ambtenaren, he worked in that position until 1992.

Rienks was made Knight in the Order of the Netherlands Lion on 29 April 1987.
