= Hein Roethof =

Dutch journalist and politician

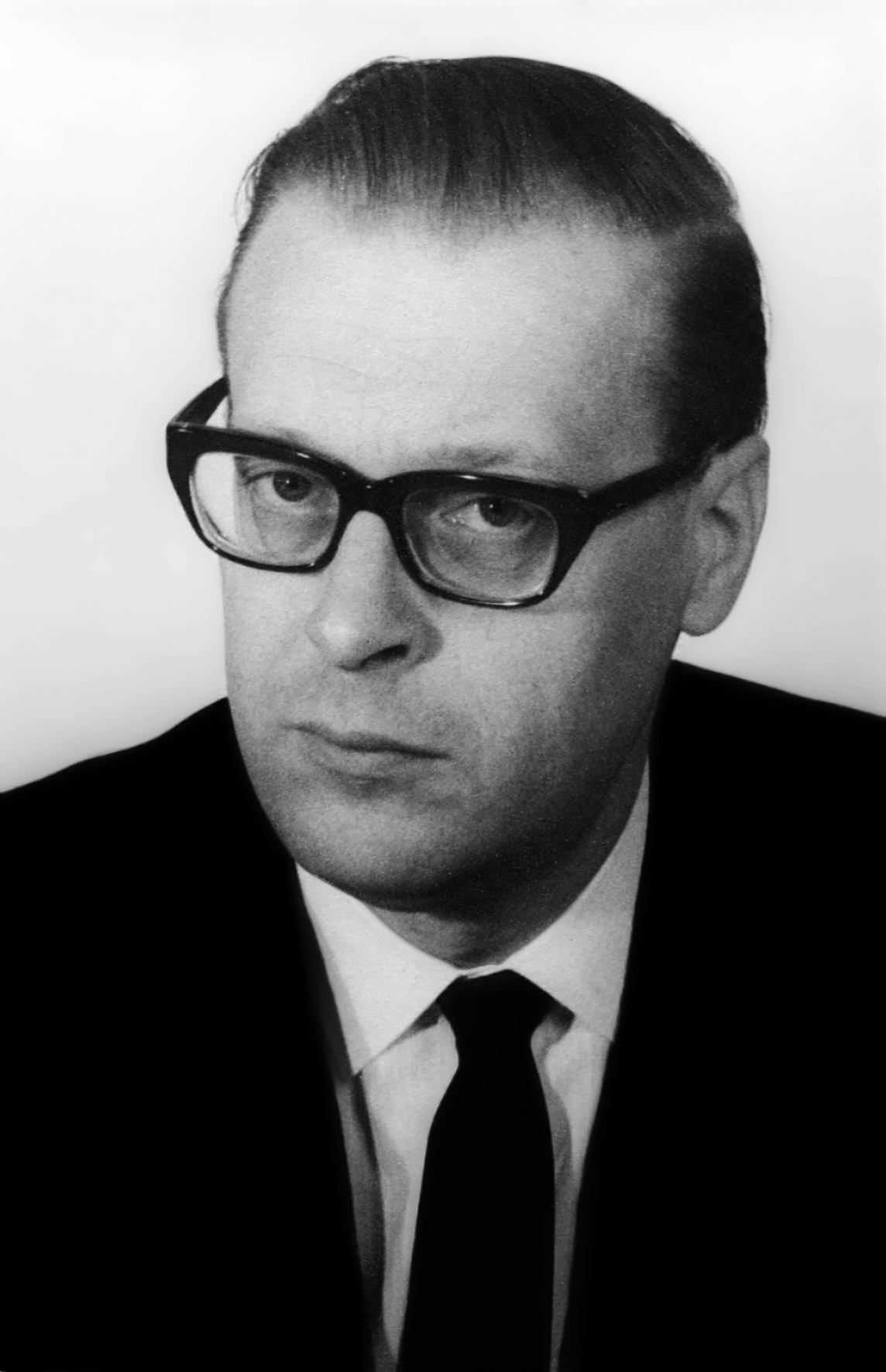

Member of the House of Representatives of the Netherlands
- In office 1986–1989

PvdA party executive
- In office 1986–1989

Member of the City council of Voorburg
- In office 1970–1971

Member of the House of Representatives of the Netherlands
- In office 1969–1982

Chairman JOVD
- In office 1951–1955

Personal details
- Born: Hendrik Jan Rutten meergenaamd Roethof; 23 November 1921 Utrecht, Netherlands
- Died: 15 January 1996 (aged 74) Utrecht, Netherlands
- Party: VVD (1949–63), PvdA (from 1964)
- Education: Utrecht University
- Occupation: Politician, journalist

Hendrik Jan (Hein) Rutten meergenaamd Roethof (23 November 1921, in Utrecht – 15 January 1996, in Utrecht) was a Dutch journalist and politician who served as a member of the Dutch House of Representatives from 1969 to 1982 and from 1986 to 1989.

== Early life ==
He completed his secondary education at the Utrecht HBS. Roethof read Law of the Dutch East Indies at Utrecht University from 1940 to 1945, from which he received his PhD in 1951.

After the Second World War he moved to the Dutch East Indies, where he was a civil servant from October 1945 to March 1946. He then worked for two years at the Government Information Service in Batavia. In 1948 he turned to journalism and was an assistant editor-in-chief of a newspaper for half a year. He then returned to the Netherlands to work at Dutch newspaper Nieuwe Rotterdamsche Courant (NRC). From 1951 to 1958 he was editor and from 1958 to 1964 parliamentary editor for the NRC.

Beside his work he was chairman of JOVD, the youth section of Dutch conservative-liberal party VVD. Because of his progressive political ideas he helped found the Liberal Democratic Centre, a group of progressive-minded VVD members who wanted Henk Korthals to succeed Pieter Oud as party leader. When Edzo Toxopeus became leader instead, Roethof broke away from the VVD and in 1964 he joined the social-democratic PvdA.

== Political career ==
From February 1964 Roethof worked at the Dutch Ministry of Foreign Affairs, until he was elected as a PvdA MP in the House of Representatives of the Netherlands in 1969. He would remain an MP until 1989, with a break from 1982 to 1986. He was specialised in matters of law, law enforcement and media. He also worked on international law, workers' rights to strike and the legal position of civil servants.

During the 1980s, Roethof was frequently the subject of controversy because of his controversial views on pedophilia. In 1984, he appeared on the television program Het Capitool to oppose a ban on child pornography. A few years later, on 30 January 1988, as a member of the House of Representatives, he gave a speech on sexual freedom of choice and related legislation during the 5th-anniversary celebration of the pro-pedophile Vereniging Martijn. During the speech, he spoke out in opposition what he saw as the unnecessary focus on child protection as "moralising of the worst kind". The next day, the newspaper Trouw would publish an interview with anesthesiologist and columnist Bob Smalhout, who advocated for mandatory AIDS testing and strongly opposed Roethof's comments. To a reply by interviewer Tim Dekkers that Roethof was merely drawing a distinction between pedophilia and child rape, Smalhout answered unwaveringly: "I don't know if you have children. But if you ever have children and a pedophile harms them, there's only one thing you'll want to do, and that is to kill that guy."

Hein Roethof died in Utrecht on 15 January 1996. His daughter, Guikje Roethof, would serve as member of the House of Representatives for D66 from 1994 to 1998.
