= Bonno Spieker =

Dutch politician (1935–2017)

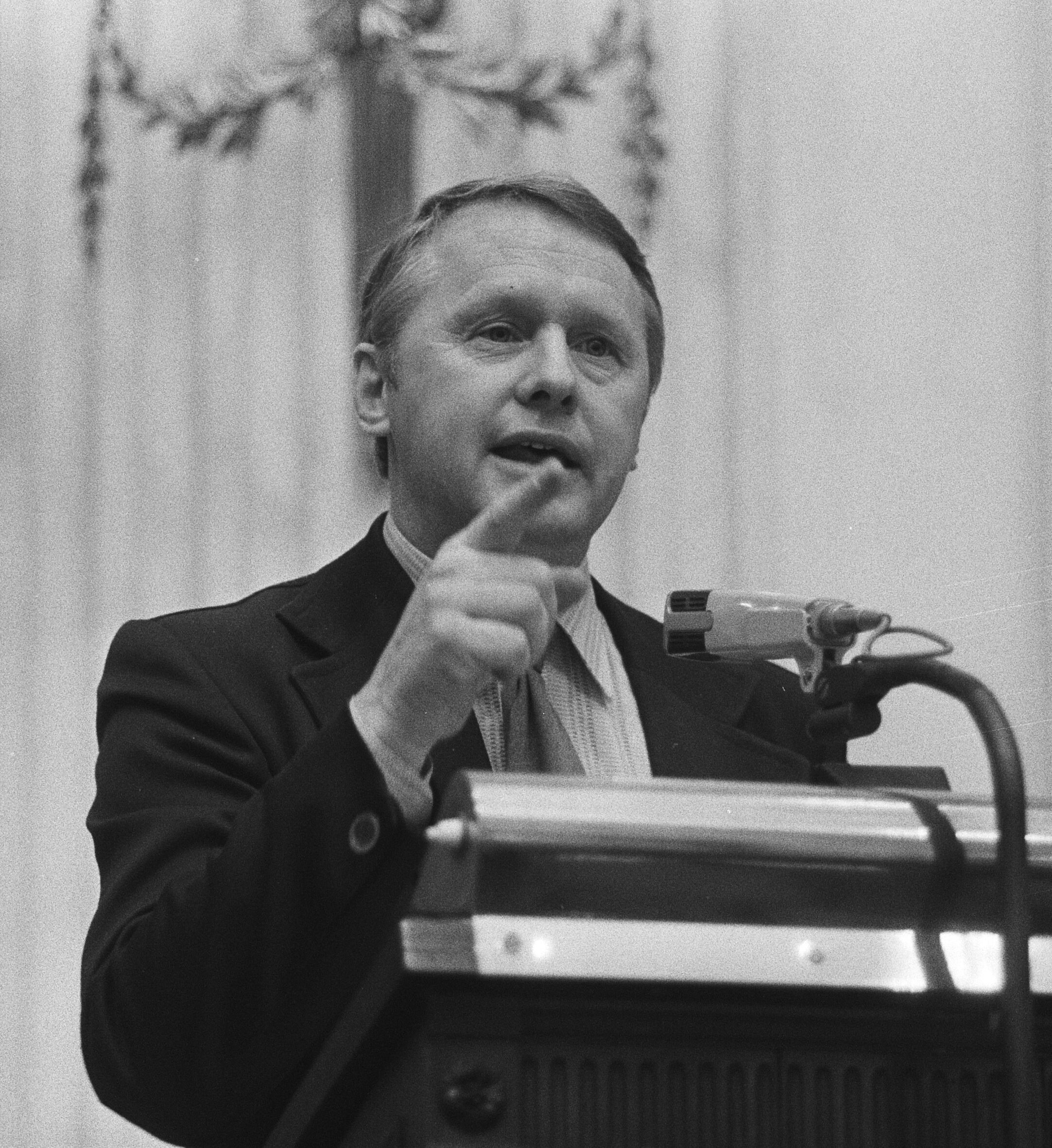
- Spieker in 1980

Member of the House of Representatives
- In office 8 June 1977 – 9 June 1981; 15 September 1981 – 16 May 1994

Member of the Provincial Council of Groningen
- In office 5 June 1974 – 1 June 1978

Personal details
- Born: 18 December 1935 Delfzijl, Netherlands
- Died: 29 March 2017 (aged 81) Delfzijl, Netherlands
- Party: Labour Party

Bonno Spieker (Dutch: [ˈbɔnoː ˈspikər]; 18 December 1935 – 29 March 2017) was a Dutch politician. He served in the House of Representatives for the Labour Party from 8 June 1977 to 10 June 1981 and again from 15 September 1981 until 17 May 1994. He was considered a member of the left wing of the party and a spokesperson for the Northern provinces.

== Career ==
Spieker was born in Delfzijl on 18 December 1935. After attending the Lagere technische school he followed a course to become ship engineer on coastal trade. He was a mechanic between 1952 and 1955 and subsequently was ship engineer from 1956 to 1964. Spieker then started working for AKZO in Delfzijl, where he was an operator until 1972 and subsequently secretary of the work council until 1977.

Politically, Spieker represented the Labour Party in the States of Groningen from 5 June 1974 to 1 June 1978. He was elected in the 1977 general election to the House of Representatives and served there from 8 June 1977 to 9 June 1981. He served again between 15 September 1981 and 16 May 1994. Spieker was known as a man of the working floor. Labour Party leader and Prime Minister of the Netherlands, Joop den Uyl, frequently took Spieker with him to factories on the brink of bankruptcy, to see whether there were still possibilities to save the company.

In the House Spieker was tasked with social and economical affairs and municipal redivisioning. He was especially involved in the redivisioning of eastern Groningen. Spieker was a known as a member of the left wing of the Labour Party and a representative of the Northern provinces of Friesland, Drenthe and especially Groningen. He supported the structural plan for the North. Spieker was one of fourteen members of Congress who did not attend the coronation of Queen Beatrix on 30 April 1980, he did so without providing a reason. In 1980 Spieker also voted for a boycott of the 1980 Summer Olympics in the Soviet Union, being part of a minority in his party. After his time in the House Spieker was a member of the municipal council of Delfzijl for four years.

Spieker died in Delfzijl on 29 March 2017.
