= Annie Krouwel-Vlam =

Dutch politician (1928–2013)

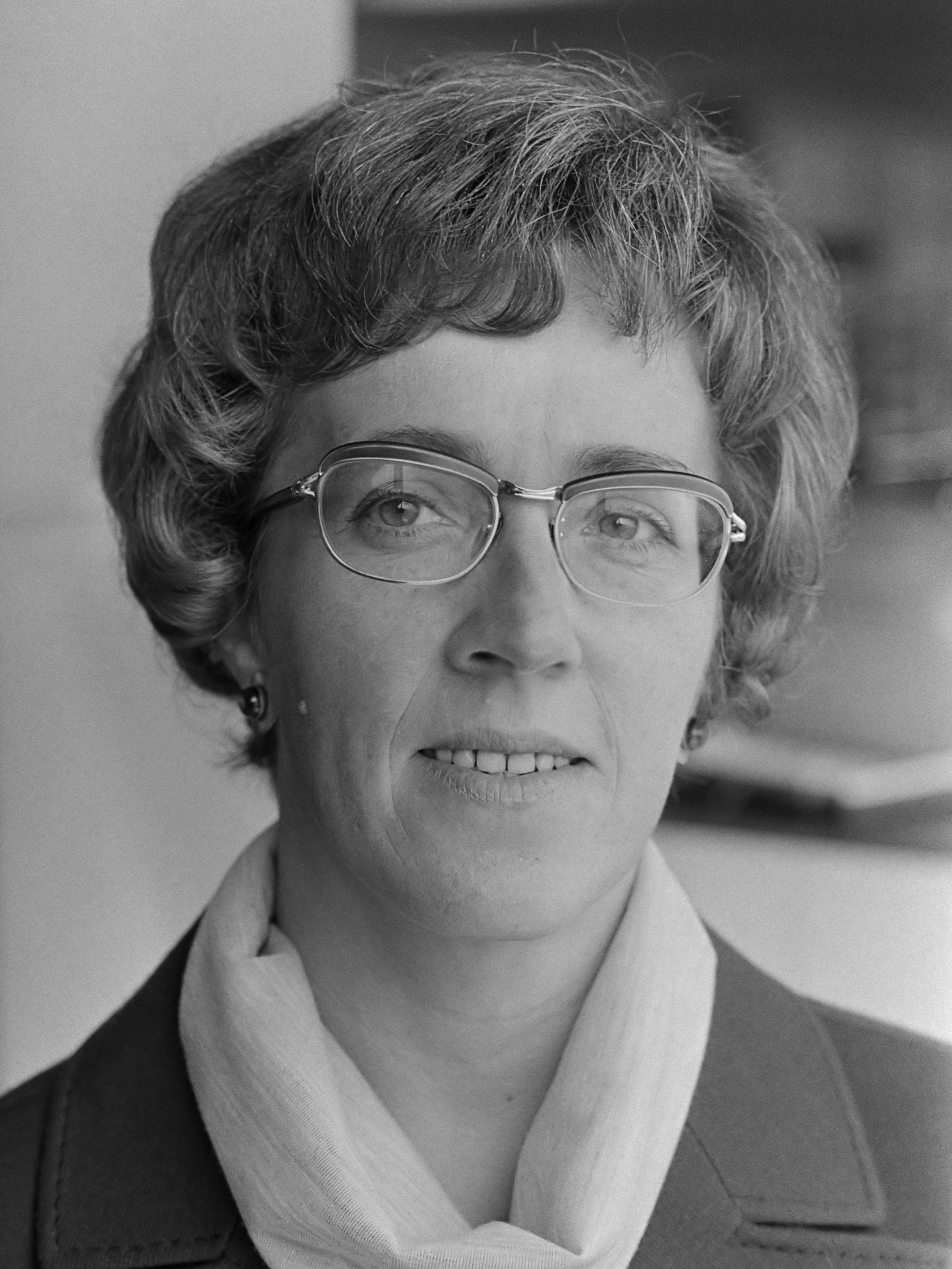
- Krouwel-Vlam in 1971

Member of the European Parliament
- In office 1977–1984

Member of the Dutch House of Representatives
- In office 18 January 1977 – 17 July 1979

Member of the provincial council of Overijssel
- In office 1968–1977

Personal details
- Born: Johanna Berendina Vlam; 29 June 1928 Hengelo, Netherlands
- Died: 5 September 2013 (aged 85) Hengelo, Netherlands
- Party: PvdA
- Parent: Jan Vlam (father)
- Occupation: Politician

Johanna Berendina (Annie) Krouwel-Vlam (29 June 1928 – 5 September 2013) was a Dutch politician for the Labour Party (PvdA).

== Early life and education ==
Krouwel was a daughter of former parliament member and mayor Jan Vlam and Diena Brussen. After high school, Krouwel-Vlam attended the Handelsavondschool. She was a board member of the Special-Neutral Preschool Education in Hengelo from 1953 to 1962.

== Political career ==
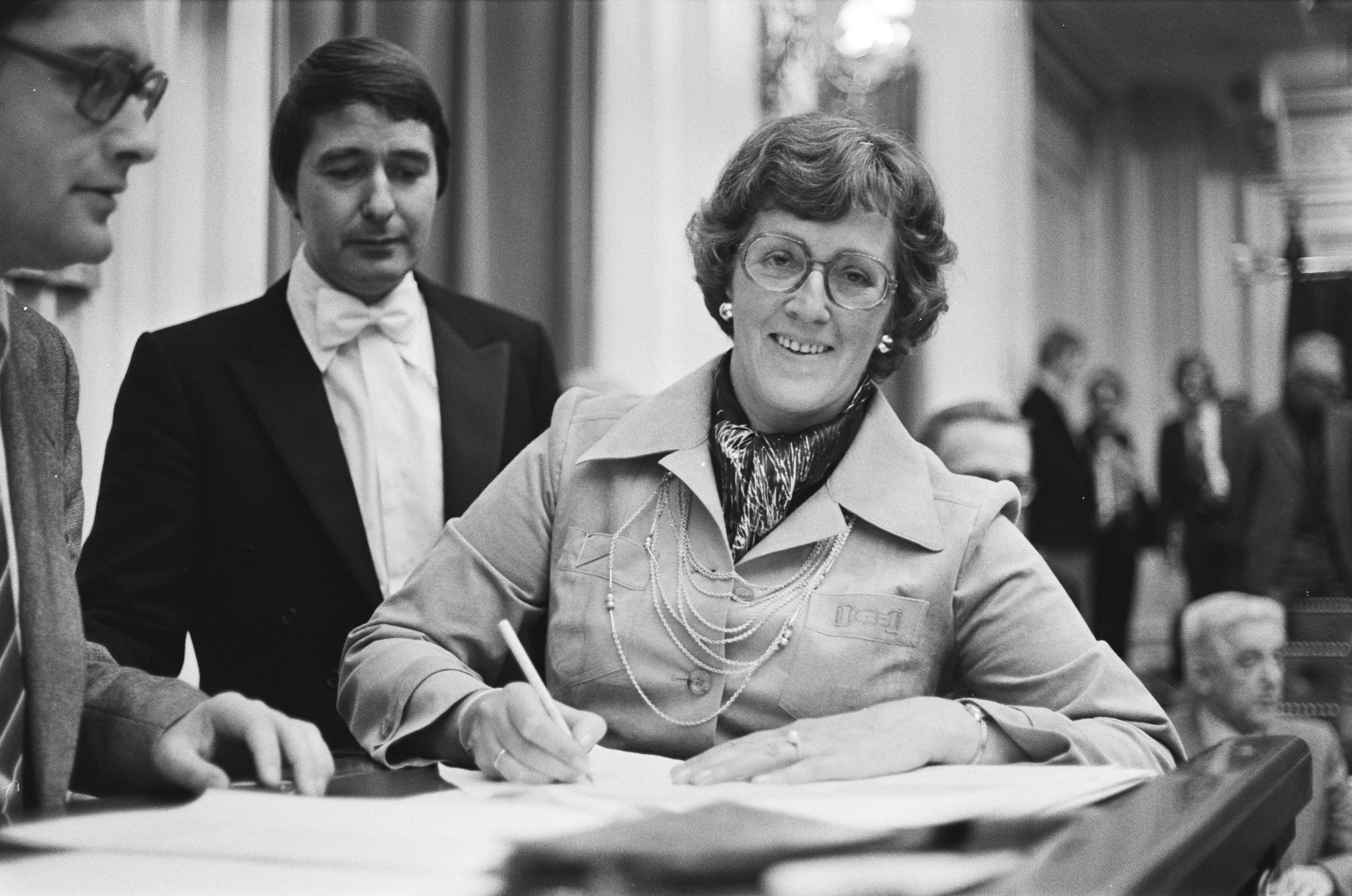
Krouwel-Vlam's assumption of office to the House of Representatives

From 1962 she was active for the Dutch Labour Party. She was secretary from 1962 to 1964 and chairman from 1964 to 1972 of the Regional Women's Contact, and from 1966 to 1972 vice-chairman of the National Women's Contact of the party. From 1966 to 1972 she was vice-chairman of the Labour Party region Overijssel.

Krouwel was elected member of the provincial council of Overijssel from 1968 to 1977, where she was also leader in the last two years. From 18 January 1977 to 17 July 1979, Krouwel was a member of the House of Representatives of the States General. In parliament she was mainly concerned with education and public health. From 1977 to 1984 she was a member of the European Parliament, one of the first to have been elected directly. Afterwards she was a board member (from 1988 to 1990) and chairman (from 1990 to 2000) of the 1940-1945 Foundation and a member of the National Committee for 4 and 5 May until May 2003.

== Decorations ==
Honours
Ribbon bar	Honour	Country	Date
	Knight of the Order of the Netherlands Lion	Netherlands	1999
