= Meiny Epema-Brugman =

Dutch schoolteacher and politician (1930–2022)

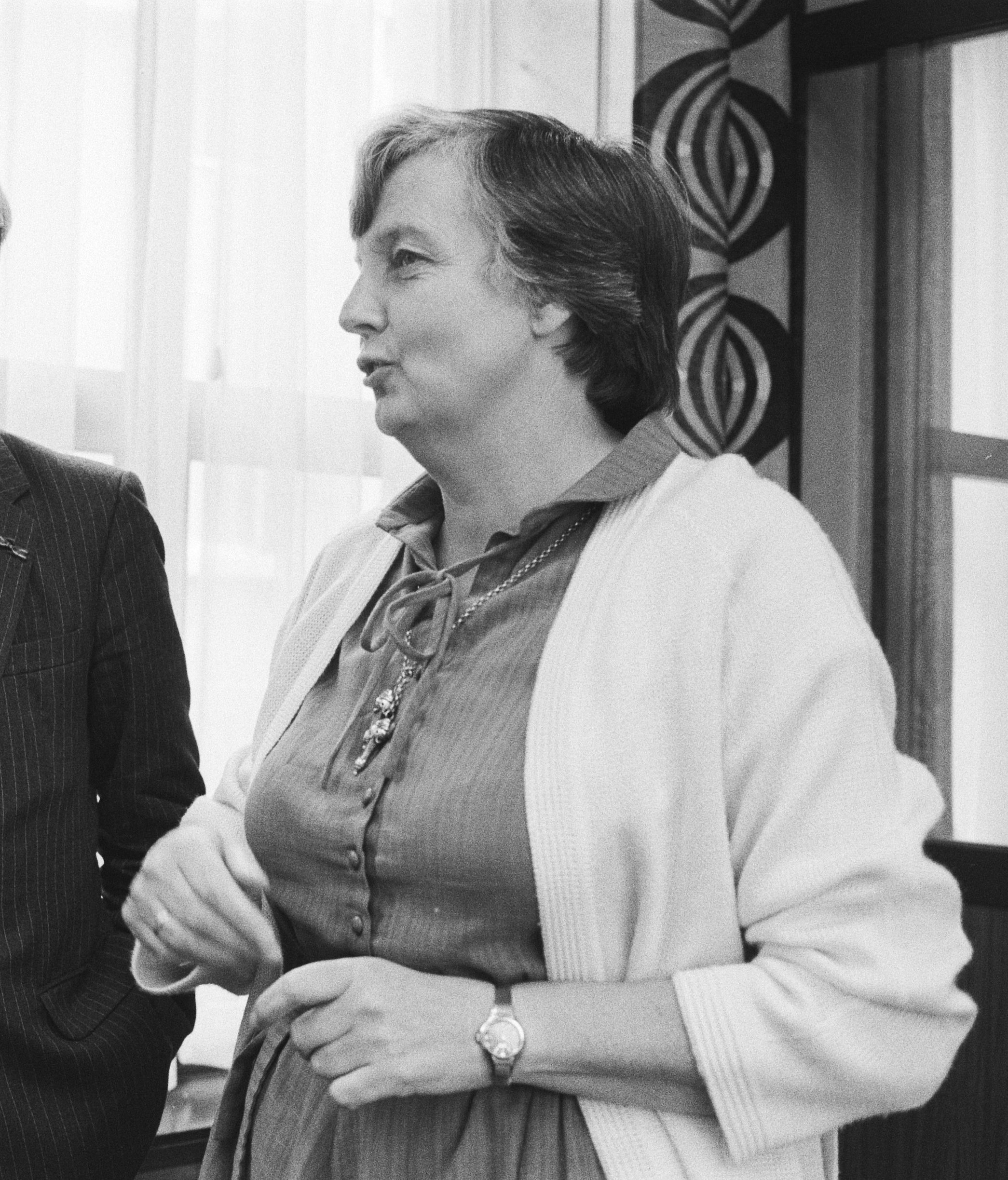
- Epema-Brugman in 1982

Member of the House of Representatives of the Netherlands
- In office 17 August 1972 – 16 September 1982
- In office 28 April 1970 – 10 May 1971

Member of the Provincial Council of South Holland
- In office January 1968 – 3 June 1970

Personal details
- Born: 28 November 1930 Groningen, Netherlands
- Died: 26 September 2022 (aged 91) Huizen, Netherlands
- Party: PvdA
- Occupation: Schoolteacher

Meiny Epema-Brugman (28 November 1930 – 26 September 2022) was a Dutch politician. A member of the Labour Party, she served in the House of Representatives from 1970 to 1971 and again from 1972 to 1982.

Epema-Brugman died in Huizen on 26 September 2022, at the age of 91.
