= Rie de Boois =

Dutch politician and biologist

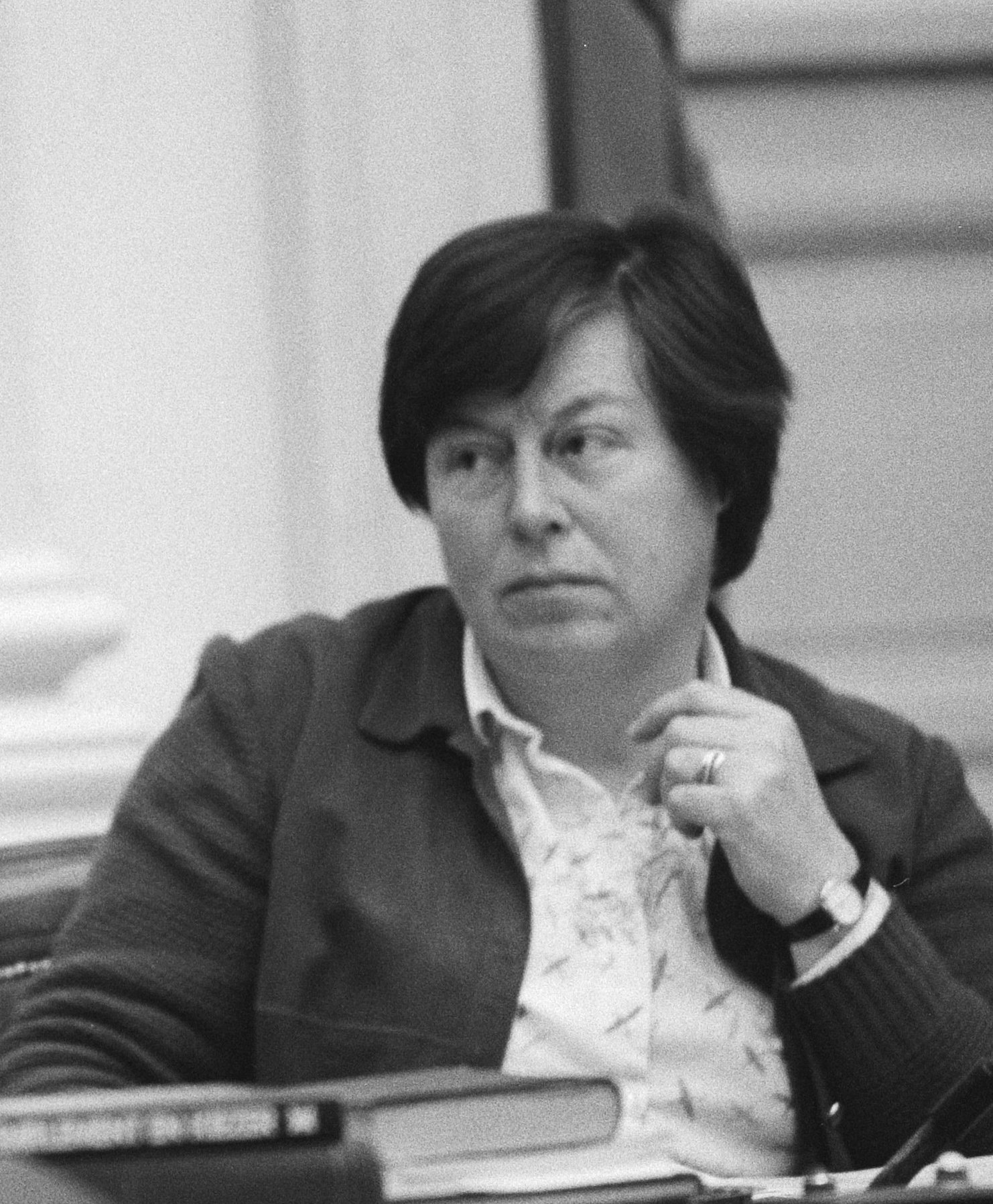

Personal details
- Born: 4 June 1936
- Died: 16 November 2010 (aged 74)
- Party: Labour Party

Henderika Maria (Rie) de Boois (Zierikzee, 4 June 1936 – Kerk-Avezaath, 16 November 2010) was a Dutch politician and biologist. She was a member of the house of representatives from 1972 until 1987 for the Labour Party.

== Early life and science ==
De Boois was the eldest of 6 children. She studied biology at Utrecht University until 1962. She became a teacher at the Dutch National Institute for Nature Conservation after finishing her degree. She later graduated from the same university with a PhD in 1976, with her thesis titled Schimmelgroei in strooisellagen van enkele bosgronden (English: Grow of fungi in the litterfall of forests).

== Political career ==
De Boois was a member of the municipal council of Arnhem from 1966 until 1974. De Boois was mainly involved in environmental matters. She fought for protection of the Wadden Sea, was a proponent of increased Dutch involvement in Antarctic research and advocated for better forest management. In 1976 she tried to abolish the use of driving in the hunt of wild boars. However, she faced resistance from members of the royal family and other people of nobility. The law would not come into effect until 2002. She was named 'Animal Protector of the Year' in 1986 for her work in animal conservation.

De Boois left the house of representatives in 1987. She became chairwoman of a water board in charge of water quality in the Gooi, Amstel and Vecht. She was the chairwomen of the Dutch Society for the Protection of Birds from 1996 until 2004.

Part of her inheritance was used to start the Rie de Boois-fund, which the Dutch Mammal Society use to fund research by volunteers.

== Personal life ==
In 1964 De Boois married Karel Nagel, himself a politician for the Labour Party and environmentalist. Their marriage ended in 1973. She later married Pierre Janssen, an art connoisseur. De Boois was a vegetarian.
