= Kees Zijlstra =

Dutch politician

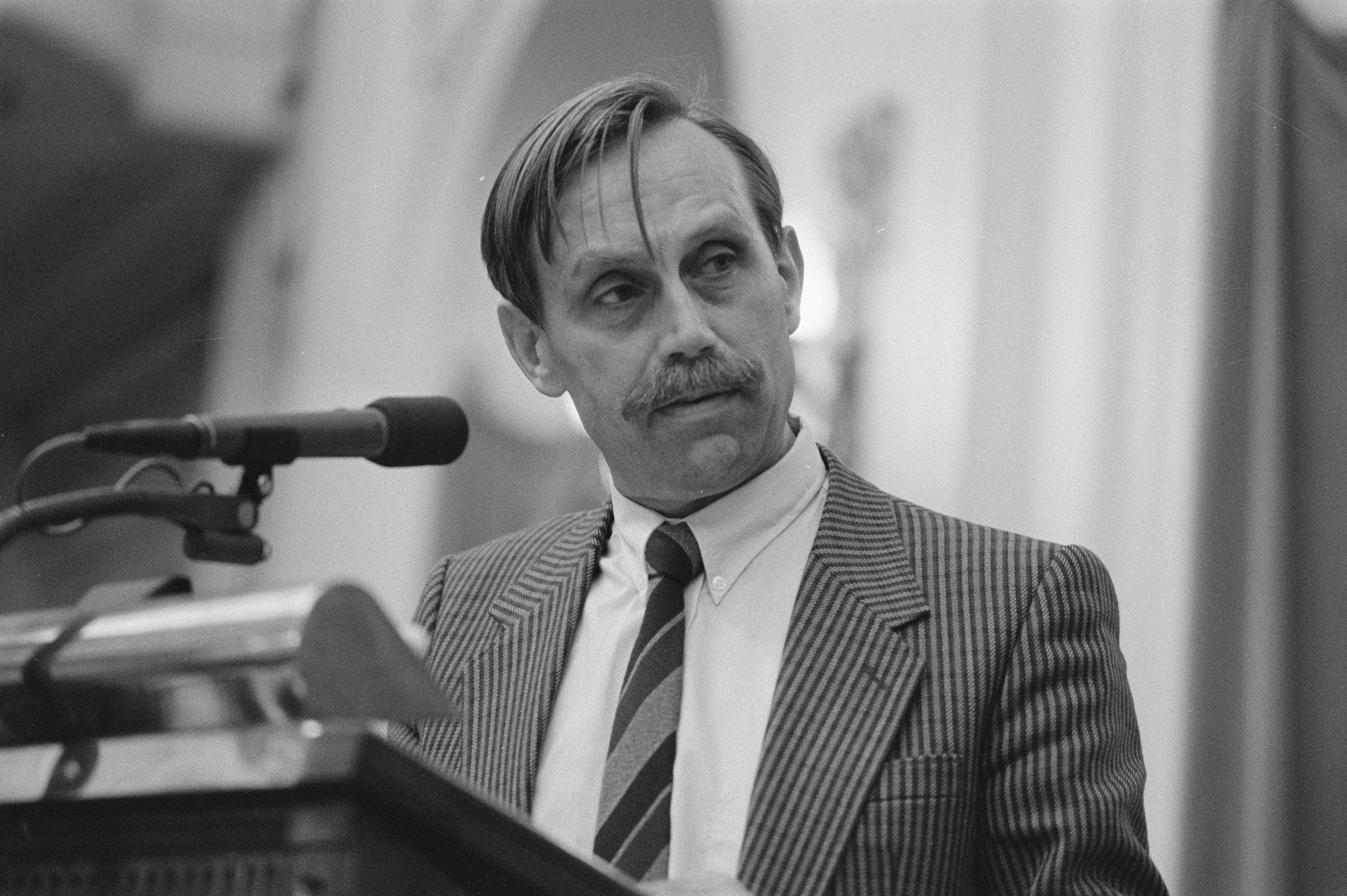
Kees Zijlstra (1986)

Kees Zijlstra (24 January 1931, in Zeist – 25 April 2013, in Sneek) was a Dutch politician, who was a member of the House of Representatives (1979–1991).
