= Cees Laban =

Dutch politician (1925–1977)

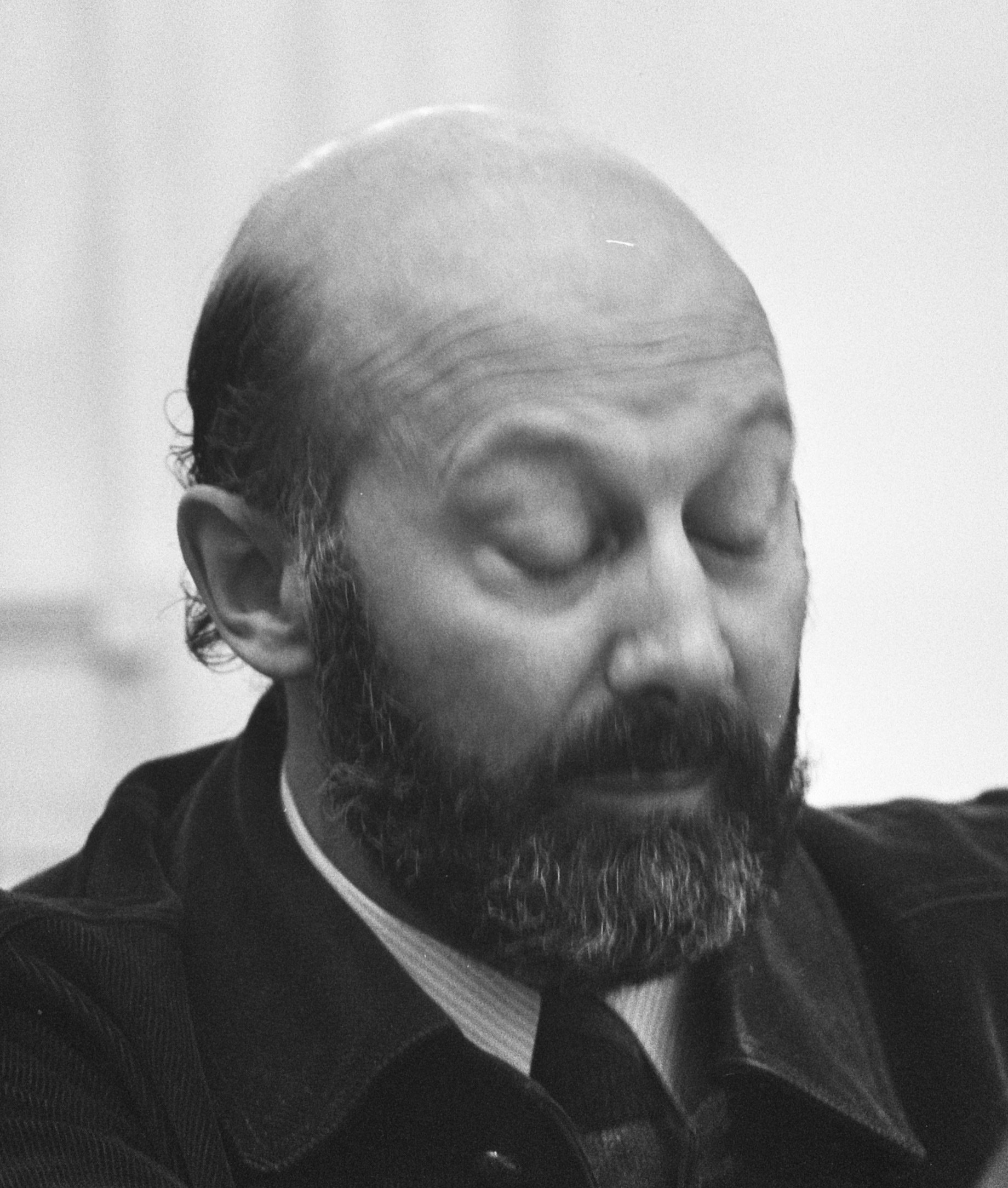
- Laban in 1972

Member of the House of Representatives
- In office 18 December 1967 – 5 September 1977
- Preceded by: Wouter van der Gevel
- Succeeded by: Frans Moor

Member of the European Parliament
- In office 3 July 1973 – 5 September 1977

Personal details
- Born: 7 September 1925; Rotterdam, Netherlands
- Died: 5 September 1977 (aged 51); Sorrento, Italy
- Political party: Labour Party

Cees Laban (7 September 1925 – 5 September 1977) was a Dutch politician. He served as a member of the House of Representatives from 1967 to 1977, and as a member of the European Parliament from 1973 to 1977. He was a member of the Labour Party.

Laban was born in Rotterdam on 7 September 1925. From 1946 to 1967, he was a civil servant for the Rotterdam municipality in the Department of Education, Youth Affairs, and Training. On 18 December 1967, Laban succeeded Wouter van der Gevel after the latter's death.

On 5 September 1997, Laban died in Sorrento, Italy, after a heart attack.
