= Marijke Wuthrich-van der Vlist =

Dutch politician (1929–2007)

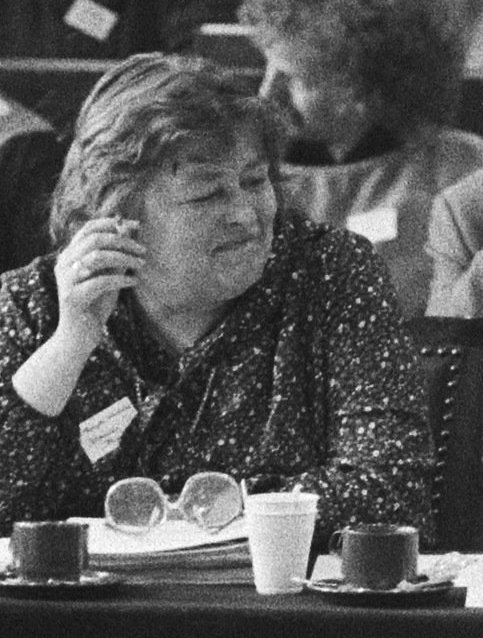
- Van der Vlist in 1980

Member of the House of Representatives
- In office 12 September 1978 – 10 June 1981

Personal details
- Born: 24 May 1929 Utrecht, Netherlands
- Died: 4 February 2007 (aged 77) Amsterdam, Netherlands
- Party: Labour Party

Marijke Wuthrich-van der Vlist (24 May 1929 – 4 February 2007) was a Dutch politician. From 1978 to 1981, she served as a member of the House of Representatives for the Labour Party.
