= Martin Konings =

Dutch politician (1929–2020)

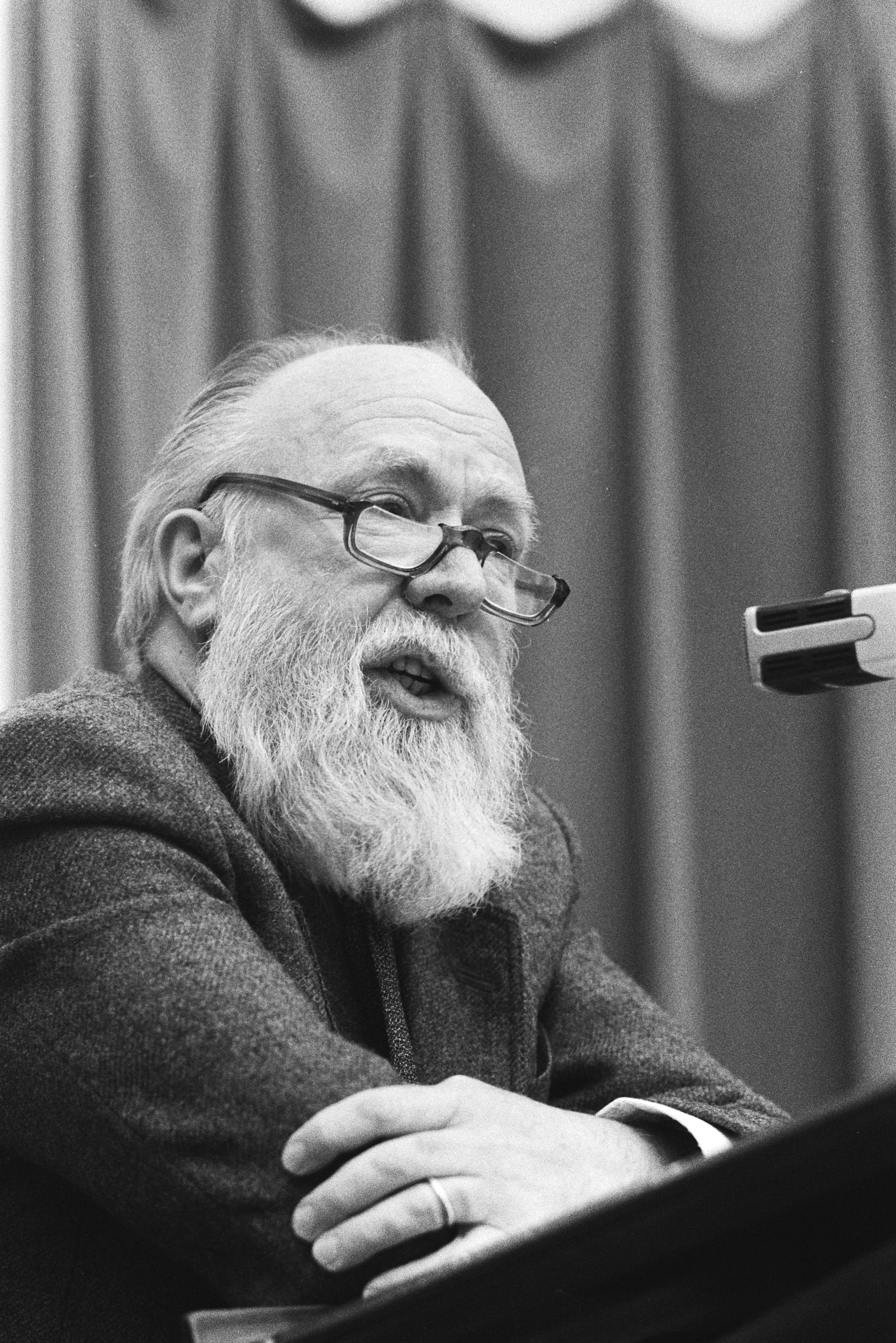
- Konings in 1983
- Born: Martinus Johannes Konings; 15 March 1929; Den Bosch
- Died: 28 July 2020 (aged 91); Maastricht
- Occupation: Politician

Martinus Johannes "Martin" Konings (15 March 1929 – 28 July 2020) was a Dutch PvdA politician who served as an MP between 1973 and 1986.
