= Kees van den Anker =

Dutch politician (1931–1982)

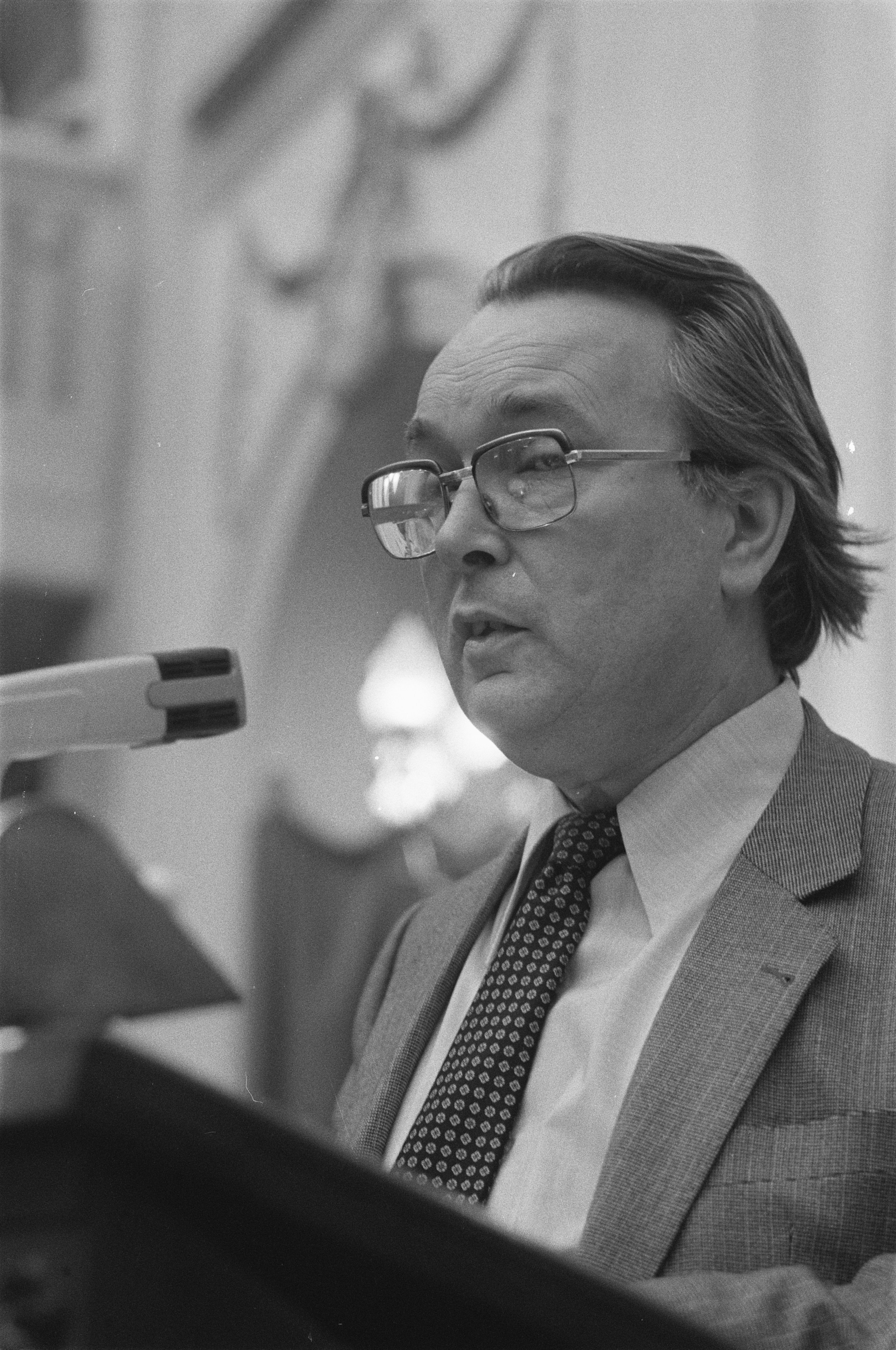
- Van den Anker in 1980

Member of the House of Representatives
- In office 28 August 1979 – 4 November 1982
- In office 15 September 1977 – 6 January 1978

Personal details
- Born: Carel Adriaan van den Anker; 6 February 1931; Amsterdam, Netherlands
- Died: 4 November 1982 (aged 51); Wageningen, Netherlands
- Political party: Labour Party

Carel Adriaan van den Anker (6 February 1931 – 4 November 1982) was a Dutch politician. He was a member of the House of Representatives for the Labour Party from 1977 to 1978, and again from 1979 to 1982.
