= Frans Moor =

Dutch politician (1940–2008)

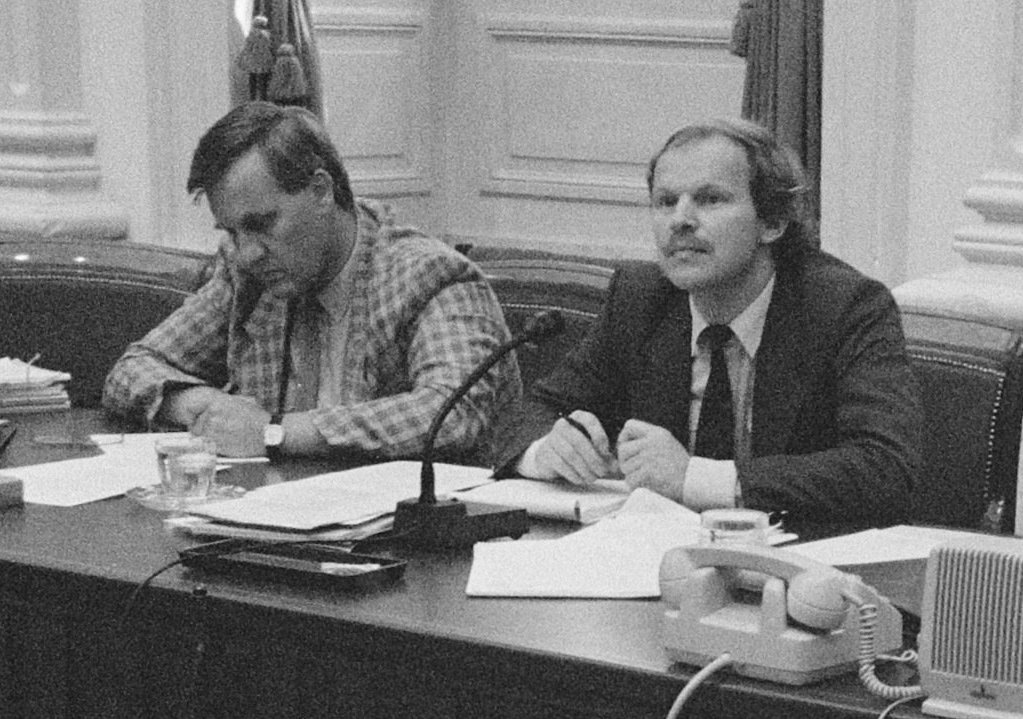
- Moor (left) in 1986

Member of the House of Representatives
- In office 15 September 1977 – 1 October 1991
- Preceded by: Cees Laban

Personal details
- Born: 25 December 1940 Hook of Holland, Netherlands
- Died: 13 January 2008 (aged 67) 's-Gravenzande, Netherlands
- Party: Socialist Party
- Other political affiliations: Labour Party (until c. 1993)

Frans Moor (25 December 1940 – 13 January 2008) was a Dutch politician. From 1977 to 1991, he served as a member of the House of Representatives for the Labour Party.
