= David van Ooijen =

Dutch Roman Catholic priest and politician

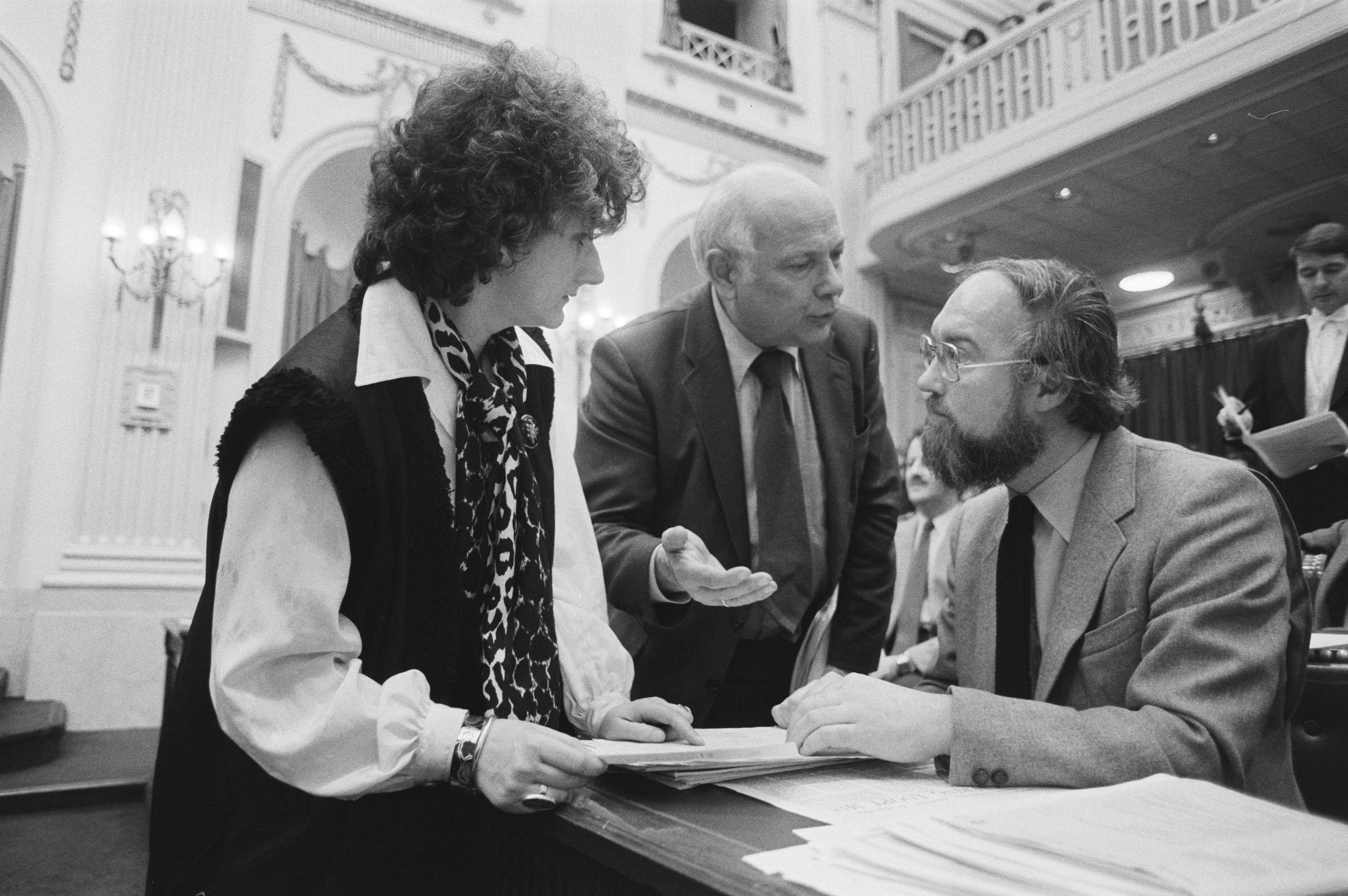
Wijnie Jabaaij, Joop den Uyl and David van Ooijen (1981)

David Adriaan Theodorus van Ooijen (25 December 1939, Wateringen - 8 November 2006, Huissen) was a Dutch Roman Catholic priest and politician who was a member of the House of Representatives from 1971 to 1986 and the Senate from 1987 to 1993 for the Labour Party (PvdA).
