= List of members of the House of Representatives of the Netherlands, 2012–2017 =

House of Representatives, 2012–2017
←	2010–2012	2017–2021	→
- Party composition of the House

Overview
- Legislative body: House of Representatives
- Term: 20 September 2012 – 22 March 2017
- Election: 2012 general election
- Government: Second Rutte cabinet VVD: 41 PvdA: 38
- Opposition: SP: 15 PvdD: 2 GL: 4 D66: 12 50PLUS: 2 CU: 5 CDA: 13 SGP: 3 PVV: 15
- Members: 150
- Speaker: Anouchka van Miltenburg; Khadija Arib

Between 20 September 2012 and 22 March 2017, 195 individuals served in the House of Representatives, the 150-seat lower house of the States-General of the Netherlands. After the general election of 12 September 2012 150 members were elected and installed at the start of the term. 43 members (temporarily) left the House of Representatives during this term, mostly for personal reasons (15) or to join the cabinet (13). Anouchka van Miltenburg was first elected Speaker of the House of Representatives and was succeeded by Khadija Arib in 2016 after Van Miltenburg resigned.

After the election, the second Rutte cabinet was formed, consisting of People's Party for Freedom and Democracy (VVD, 41 seats) and Labour Party (PvdA, 38 seats). The opposition consisted of Party for Freedom (PVV, 15 seats), Socialist Party (SP, 15 seats), Christian Democratic Appeal (CDA, 13 seats), Democrats 66 (D66, 12 seats), Christian Union (CU, 5 seats), GroenLinks (GL, 4 seats), Reformed Political Party (SGP, 3 seats), Party for the Animals (PvdD, 2 seats) and 50PLUS (50+, 2 seats).

During the term, several members switched their parliamentary group affiliation, changing the party composition of the House of Representatives. (Note: Resignations generally do not affect the balance of power, as replacements are appointed from the party list) In June 2014, the 50+ group split into two, with both claiming the name 50+, resulting in 50+/Baay and 50+/Klein, until Norbert Klein decided to continue as independent on 13 November 2014. Houwers (VVD) left parliament in 2013 due to fraud allegations. He returned on 25 March 2015, but was not allowed back into the VVD group and continued as independent. Three members left the PVV – Louis Bontes (29 October 2013), Roland van Vliet (March 2014), and Joram van Klaveren (March 2014) – and continued independently. Bontes and Van Klaveren formed a group starting April 2014. On 14 November 2014, Tunahan Kuzu and Selçuk Öztürk left the PvdA to continue as independent group. Jacques Monasch left the PvdA in November 2016.

== Members ==
All members are sworn in at the start of the term, even if they are not new. Assumed office in this list therefore refers to the swearing in during this term (or return date of members who went on parental or sick leave), while all members are automatically considered to have left office at the end of the term.

Members of the House of Representatives of the Netherlands, 2012–2017
Name	Parliamentary group	Assumed office	Left office	Ref.
Fleur Agema	PVV	20 September 2012	12 January 2015 (Note: Went on parental leave)	
Fleur Agema	PVV	5 May 2015	22 March 2017	
Mustafa Amhaouch	CDA	12 January 2016	22 March 2017	
Khadija Arib	PvdA	20 September 2012	22 March 2017	
Tamara van Ark	VVD	20 September 2012	22 March 2017	
Amma Asante	PvdA	7 September 2016	22 March 2017	
Malik Azmani	VVD	20 September 2012	22 March 2017	
Martine Baay-Timmerman	50+ (Note: Until 3 June 2014)	29 October 2013	9 September 2014 (Note: Went on sick leave and subsequently resigned)	
Martine Baay-Timmerman	50+/Baay (Note: From 3 June 2014)	29 October 2013	9 September 2014	
Farshad Bashir	SP	20 September 2012	22 March 2017	
Harm Beertema	PVV	20 September 2012	22 March 2017	
Salima Belhaj	D66	26 January 2016	22 March 2017	
Ybeltje Berckmoes-Duindam	VVD	20 September 2012	22 March 2017	
Vera Bergkamp	D66	20 September 2012	22 March 2017	
Magda Berndsen	D66	20 September 2012	31 October 2015 (Note: Left for personal reasons)	
Roelof Bisschop	SGP	20 September 2012	22 March 2017	
Stef Blok	VVD	20 September 2012	4 November 2012 (Note: Left to join the cabinet)	
Betty de Boer	VVD	20 September 2012	22 March 2017	
Harry van Bommel	SP	20 September 2012	22 March 2017	
Désirée Bonis	PvdA	20 September 2012	12 June 2013 (Note: Left for personal reasons)	
Louis Bontes	PVV (Note: Until 29 October 2013)	20 September 2012	22 March 2017	
Louis Bontes	Bontes (Note: Between 29 October 2013 and 15 April 2014)	20 September 2012	22 March 2017	
Louis Bontes	Bontes/Van Klaveren (Note: Since 15 April 2014)	20 September 2012	22 March 2017	
Martin Bosma	PVV	20 September 2012	22 March 2017	
Remco Bosma	VVD	1 March 2016	22 March 2017	
André Bosman	VVD	20 September 2012	22 March 2017	
Lea Bouwmeester	PvdA	20 September 2012	13 May 2013	
Lea Bouwmeester	PvdA	3 September 2013	29 February 2016	
Lea Bouwmeester	PvdA	10 June 2016	22 March 2017	
Han ten Broeke	VVD	20 September 2012	22 March 2017	
Harm Brouwer	PvdA	1 March 2016	9 June 2016	
Harm Brouwer	PvdA	6 July 2016	22 March 2017	
Hanke Bruins Slot	CDA	20 September 2012	22 March 2017	
Eppo Bruins	CU	2 December 2015	22 March 2017	
Brigitte van der Burg	VVD	20 September 2012	22 March 2017	
Ingrid de Caluwé	VVD	20 September 2012	22 March 2017	
Yasemin Çegerek	PvdA	18 June 2013	21 August 2013	
Yasemin Çegerek	PvdA	12 December 2013	22 March 2017	
Martijn van Dam	PvdA	20 September 2012	2 November 2015	
Tjeerd van Dekken	PvdA	20 September 2012	22 March 2017	
Teun van Dijck	PVV	20 September 2012	22 March 2017	
Jasper van Dijk	SP	20 September 2012	22 March 2017	
Otwin van Dijk	PvdA	20 September 2012	5 July 2016 (Note: Left to become mayor of Oude IJsselstreek)	
Elbert Dijkgraaf	SGP	20 September 2012	22 March 2017	
Klaas Dijkhoff	VVD	20 September 2012	20 March 2015	
Pia Dijkstra	D66	20 September 2012	22 March 2017	
Remco Dijkstra	VVD	20 September 2012	22 March 2017	
Jeroen Dijsselbloem	PvdA	20 September 2012	4 November 2012	
Carla Dik-Faber	CU	20 September 2012	22 March 2017	
Sjoera Dikkers	PvdA	20 September 2012	24 October 2016 (Note: Went on sick leave)	
Sjoera Dikkers	PvdA	15 February 2017	22 March 2017	
Pieter Duisenberg	VVD	20 September 2012	22 March 2017	
Angelien Eijsink	PvdA	20 September 2012	22 March 2017	
Ton Elias	VVD	20 September 2012	22 March 2017	
Corinne Ellemeet	GL	18 November 2014	8 March 2015	
Manon Fokke	PvdA	20 September 2012	21 September 2015	
Manon Fokke	PvdA	12 January 2016	22 March 2017	
Sietse Fritsma	PVV	20 September 2012	22 March 2017	
Karen Gerbrands	PVV	13 January 2015	4 May 2015	
Henk van Gerven	SP	20 September 2012	22 March 2017	
Jock Geselschap	VVD	30 November 2016	22 March 2017	
Sharon Gesthuizen	CDA	20 September 2012	22 March 2017	
Jaco Geurts	CDA	20 September 2012	22 March 2017	
Machiel de Graaf	PVV	20 September 2012	22 March 2017	
Rik Grashoff	GL	20 May 2015	22 March 2017	
Dion Graus	PVV	20 September 2012	22 March 2017	
Ed Groot	PvdA	20 September 2012	22 March 2017	
Sultan Günal-Gezer	PvdA	8 November 2012	22 March 2017	
Wassila Hachchi	D66	20 September 2012	19 January 2016 (Note: Left to work for the Hillary Clinton 2016 presidential campaign)	
Sybrand van Haersma Buma	CDA	20 September 2012	22 March 2017	
Mariëtte Hamer	PvdA	20 September 2012	9 September 2014 (Note: Left to become chair of the Social and Economic Council)	
Mark Harbers	VVD	20 September 2012	22 March 2017	
Rudmer Heerema	VVD	3 September 2013	22 March 2017	
Pieter Heerma	CDA	20 September 2012	22 March 2017	
Pierre Heijnen	PvdA	20 September 2012	31 August 2013 (Note: Left to become chair of the board of ROC Mondriaan)	
Lilian Helder	PVV	20 September 2012	22 March 2017	
Martijn van Helvert	CDA	12 November 2014	22 March 2017	
Jeanine Hennis-Plasschaert	VVD	20 September 2012	4 November 2012	
Eddy van Hijum	CDA	20 September 2012	11 November 2014 (Note: Left to become lead candidate for the 2015 Dutch provincial elections in Overijssel)	
Myrthe Hilkens	PvdA	20 September 2012	28 August 2013 (Note: Left because, according to herself, she had to compromise moral convictions more than once for the sake of media representation or coalition interests)	
Duco Hoogland	PvdA	8 November 2012	22 March 2017	
Johan Houwers	VVD	8 November 2012	22 July 2013 (Note: Left after fraud allegations)	
Johan Houwers	Houwers	25 March 2015	22 March 2017	
Matthijs Huizing	VVD	20 September 2012	6 December 2013 (Note: Left after he was arrested for drunk driving)	
Lutz Jacobi	PvdA	20 September 2012	22 March 2017	
Tanja Jadnanansing	PvdA	20 September 2012	6 September 2016	
Paulus Jansen	SP	20 September 2012	13 May 2014 (Note: Left to become alderman of Utrecht)	
Sadet Karabulut	SP	20 September 2012	4 August 2013	
Sadet Karabulut	SP	26 November 2013	22 March 2017	
Mona Keijzer	CDA	20 September 2012	22 March 2017	
John Kerstens	PvdA	20 September 2012	22 March 2017	
Jesse Klaver	GL	20 September 2012	22 March 2017	
Joram van Klaveren	PVV (Note: Until 22 March 2014)	20 September 2012	22 March 2017	
Joram van Klaveren	Van Klaveren (Note: Between 22 March 2014 and 15 April 2014)	20 September 2012	22 March 2017	
Joram van Klaveren	Bontes/Van Klaveren (Note: Since 15 April 2014)	20 September 2012	22 March 2017	
Norbert Klein	50+ (Note: Until 3 June 2014)	20 September 2012	22 March 2017	
Norbert Klein	50+/Klein (Note: Between 3 June 2014 and 13 November 2014)	20 September 2012	22 March 2017	
Norbert Klein	Klein (Note: Starting 13 November 2014)	20 September 2012	22 March 2017	
Reinette Klever	PVV	20 September 2012	22 March 2017	
Jetta Klijnsma	PvdA	20 September 2012	4 November 2012	
Nine Kooiman	SP	20 September 2012	22 March 2017	
Wouter Koolmees	D66	20 September 2012	22 March 2017	
Fatma Koşer Kaya	D66	19 August 2015	22 March 2017	
Raymond Knops	CDA	20 September 2012	22 March 2017	
Henk Krol	50+	20 September 2012	3 October 2013 (Note: Left after it was revealed he had not paid the pensions of his employees when he was editor in chief of Gay Krant)	
Henk Krol	50+/Baay (Note: Between 10 September 2014 and 13 November 2014)	10 September 2014	22 March 2017	
Henk Krol	50+ (Note: Since 13 November 2014)	10 September 2014	22 March 2017	
Attje Kuiken	PvdA	20 September 2012	22 March 2017	
Tunahan Kuzu	PvdA (Note: Until 14 November 2014)	20 September 2012	22 March 2017	
Tunahan Kuzu	Kuzu/Öztürk (Note: Since 14 November 2014)	20 September 2012	22 March 2017	
Roelof van Laar	PvdA	14 May 2013	22 March 2017	
Leendert de Lange	VVD	31 March 2015	22 March 2017	
René Leegte	VVD	20 September 2012	23 March 2015 (Note: Left after it was revealed that he had not declared his secondary functions and income)	
Henk Leenders	PvdA	3 September 2013	11 December 2013	
Henk Leenders	PvdA	10 September 2014	22 March 2017	
Renske Leijten	SP	20 September 2012	5 February 2014	
Renske Leijten	SP	29 May 2014	22 March 2017	
Bart de Liefde	VVD	20 September 2012	18 February 2016	
Roald van der Linde	VVD	8 November 2012	22 March 2017	
Pieter Litjens	VVD	20 September 2012	24 June 2014 (Note: Left to become alderman in Amsterdam)	
Helma Lodders	VVD	20 September 2012	22 March 2017	
Anne-Wil Lucas	VVD	20 September 2012	6 September 2016	
Barry Madlener	PVV	20 September 2012	22 March 2017	
Marit Maij	PvdA	20 September 2012	22 March 2017	
Ahmed Marcouch	PvdA	20 September 2012	22 March 2017	
Paul van Meenen	D66	20 September 2012	22 March 2017	
Arnold Merkies	SP	20 September 2012	22 March 2017	
Anouchka van Miltenburg	VVD	20 September 2012	22 March 2017	
Mohammed Mohandis	PvdA	20 September 2012	22 March 2017	
Jacques Monasch	PvdA (Note: Until 8 November 2016)	20 September 2012	22 March 2017	
Jacques Monasch	Monasch (Note: Since 8 November 2016)	20 September 2012	22 March 2017	
Perjan Moors	VVD	14 January 2014	22 March 2017	
Agnes Mulder	CDA	20 September 2012	22 March 2017	
Anne Mulder	VVD	20 September 2012	22 March 2017	
Helma Neppérus	VVD	20 September 2012	22 March 2017	
Cora van Nieuwenhuizen	VVD	20 September 2012	30 June 2014 (Note: Left to become a member of the European Parliament)	
Henk Nijboer	PvdA	20 September 2012	22 March 2017	
Chantal Nijkerken-de Haan	VVD	31 March 2015	22 March 2017	
Michiel van Nispen	SP	2 April 2014	22 March 2017	
Bram van Ojik	GL	20 September 2012	9 May 2015 (Note: Left to make space for a new parliamentary leader)	
Pieter Omtzigt	CDA	20 September 2012	22 March 2017	
Astrid Oosenbrug	PvdA	20 September 2012	22 March 2017	
Foort van Oosten	VVD	20 September 2012	22 March 2017	
Peter Oskam	CDA	20 September 2012	3 January 2016 (Note: Left to become mayor of Capelle aan den IJssel)	
Esther Ouwehand	PvdD	20 September 2012	16 November 2015	
Esther Ouwehand	PvdD	18 October 2016	22 March 2017	
Selçuk Öztürk	PvdA	8 November 2012	22 March 2017	
Selçuk Öztürk	Kuzu/Öztürk	8 November 2012	22 March 2017	
Alexander Pechtold	D66	20 September 2012	22 March 2017	
Ronald Plasterk	PvdA	20 September 2012	4 November 2012	
Sjoerd Potters	VVD	8 November 2012	22 March 2017	
Ronald van Raak	SP	20 September 2012	22 March 2017	
Jeroen Recourt	PvdA	20 September 2012	22 March 2017	
Daniël van der Ree	VVD	7 September 2016	22 March 2017	
Emile Roemer	SP	20 September 2012	22 March 2017	
Michel Rog	CDA	20 September 2012	22 March 2017	
Erik Ronnes	CDA	20 May 2015	22 March 2017	
Raymond de Roon	PVV	20 September 2012	22 March 2017	
Sander de Rouwe	CDA	20 September 2012	19 May 2015 (Note: Left to become lead candidate for the 2015 Dutch provincial elections in Friesland)	
Arno Rutte	VVD	20 September 2012	22 March 2017	
Mark Rutte	VVD	20 September 2012	4 November 2012	
Diederik Samsom	PvdA	20 September 2012	13 December 2016 (Note: Left after losing the election for PvdA lead candidate)	
Jolande Sap	GL	20 September 2012	22 October 2012 (Note: Left after a disappointing election result)	
Edith Schippers	VVD	20 September 2012	4 November 2012	
Carola Schouten	CU	20 September 2012	22 March 2017	
Gerard Schouw	D66	20 September 2012	31 July 2015 (Note: Left for another job)	
Anoushka Schut-Welkzijn	VVD	20 September 2012	22 March 2017	
Gert-Jan Segers	CU	20 September 2012	22 March 2017	
Michiel Servaes	PvdA	20 September 2012	22 March 2017	
Tjitske Siderius	SP	3 September 2013	25 November 2013	
Tjitske Siderius	SP	6 February 2014	22 March 2017	
Sjoerd Sjoerdsma	D66	20 September 2012	22 March 2017	
Arie Slob	CU	20 September 2012	1 December 2015 (Note: Left to become director of the Historisch Centrum Overijssel)	
Eric Smaling	SP	14 May 2013	22 March 2017	
Manja Smits	SP	20 September 2012	13 May 2013	
Kees van der Staaij	SGP	20 September 2012	22 March 2017	
Ard van der Steur	VVD	20 September 2012	19 March 2015	
Karin Straus	VVD	20 September 2012	22 March 2017	
Henri Swinkels	SP	14 May 2014	28 May 2014	
Judith Swinkels	D66	3 November 2015	22 March 2017	
Grace Tanamal	PvdA	8 November 2012	22 March 2017	
Joost Taverne	VVD	8 November 2012	22 March 2017	
Fred Teeven	VVD	20 September 2012	4 November 2012	
Fred Teeven	VVD	26 March 2015	22 March 2017	
Ockje Tellegen	VVD	20 September 2012	22 March 2017	
Marianne Thieme	PvdD	20 September 2012	22 March 2017	
Frans Timmermans	PvdA	20 September 2012	4 November 2012	
Liesbeth van Tongeren	GL	20 September 2012	22 March 2017	
Madeleine van Toorenburg	CDA	20 September 2012	22 March 2017	
Paul Ulenbelt	SP	20 September 2012	22 March 2017	
Emre Ünver	PvdA	14 December 2016	14 February 2017	
Michiel van Veen	VVD	20 September 2012	29 November 2016 (Note: Left to become mayor of Gemert-Bakel)	
Rien van der Velde	PvdA	25 October 2016	22 March 2017	
Stientje van Veldhoven	D66	20 September 2012	22 March 2017	
Hayke Veldman	VVD	25 June 2014	22 March 2017	
Mark Verheijen	VVD	20 September 2012	26 February 2015 (Note: Left after integrity violations surrounding declarations when he was member of the provincial executive of Limburg)	
Kees Verhoeven	D66	20 September 2012	22 March 2017	
Roos Vermeij	PvdA	20 September 2012	22 March 2017	
Joyce Vermue	PvdA	22 September 2015	22 March 2017	
Barbara Visser	VVD	20 September 2012	22 March 2017	
Roland van Vliet	PVV (Note: Until 21 March 2014)	20 September 2012	22 March 2017	
Roland van Vliet	Van Vliet (Note: Since 21 March 2014)	20 September 2012	22 March 2017	
Marith Volp	PvdA	3 September 2013	22 March 2017	
Joël Voordewind	CU	20 September 2012	22 March 2017	
Linda Voortman	GL	30 October 2012	17 November 2014	
Linda Voortman	GL	9 March 2015	22 March 2017	
Jan Vos	PvdA	20 September 2012	22 March 2017	
Mei Li Vos	PvdA	20 September 2012	22 March 2017	
Albert de Vries	PvdA	20 September 2012	22 March 2017	
Aukje de Vries	VVD	8 November 2012	22 March 2017	
Ronald Vuijk	VVD	8 November 2012	22 March 2017	
Frank Wassenberg	PvdD	17 November 2015	17 October 2016	
Frans Weekers	VVD	20 September 2012	4 November 2012	
Steven van Weyenberg	D66	20 September 2012	22 March 2017	
Jeroen van Wijngaarden	VVD	1 July 2014	22 March 2017	
Geert Wilders	PVV	20 September 2012	22 March 2017	
Jan de Wit	SP	20 September 2012	1 April 2014 (Note: Left for personal reasons)	
Agnes Wolbert	PvdA	20 September 2012	22 March 2017	
Bas van 't Wout	VVD	20 September 2012	22 March 2017	
Loes Ypma	PvdA	20 September 2012	22 March 2017	
Keklik Yücel	PvdA	20 September 2012	22 March 2017	
Erik Ziengs	VVD	20 September 2012	22 March 2017	
Halbe Zijlstra	VVD	20 September 2012	22 March 2017	

== See also ==
- List of candidates in the 2012 Dutch general election
