= List of candidates in the 2012 Dutch general election =

Prior to the 2012 Dutch general election, contesting parties put forward party lists.

== 1: People's Party for Freedom and Democracy ==
Candidate list for the People's Party for Freedom and Democracy
Position	Candidate	Votes	Result
1	Mark Rutte	2,129,000	Elected
2	Edith Schippers	123,889	Elected
3	Stef Blok	9,316	Elected
4	Anouchka van Miltenburg	13,677	Elected
5	Fred Teeven	35,103	Elected
6	Jeanine Hennis-Plasschaert	39,197	Elected
7	Halbe Zijlstra	4,285	Elected
8	Frans Weekers	12,409	Elected
9	Mark Harbers	3,234	Elected
10	Tamara Venrooy-van Ark	4,343	Elected
11	Betty de Boer	7,786	Elected
12	Han ten Broeke	14,403	Elected
13	Cora van Nieuwenhuizen-Wijbenga	4,636	Elected
14	Helma Neppérus	1,904	Elected
15	Ard van der Steur	2,021	Elected
16	Klaas Dijkhoff	3,200	Elected
17	Ton Elias	1,555	Elected
18	Anne Mulder	1,204	Elected
19	Mark Verheijen	8,993	Elected
20	Malik Azmani	1,874	Elected
21	Barbara Visser	3,509	Elected
22	Helma Lodders	3,734	Elected
23	Pieter Duisenberg	2,862	Elected
24	Erik Ziengs	8,948	Elected
25	Pieter Litjens	2,010	Elected
26	Brigitte van der Burg	1,303	Elected
27	Bas van 't Wout	1,178	Elected
28	Anne-Wil Lucas-Smeerdijk	1,733	Elected
29	André Bosman	6,732	Elected
30	René Leegte	3,319	Elected
31	Remco Dijkstra	1,130	Elected
32	Ockje Tellegen	1,470	Elected
33	Foort van Oosten	634	Elected
34	Karin Straus	6,800	Elected
35	Matthijs Huizing	1,194	Elected
36	Bart de Liefde	2,163	Elected
37	Michiel van Veen	1,305	Elected
38	Arno Rutte	1,874	Elected
39	Ybeltje Berckmoes-Duindam	1,196	Elected
40	Anoushka Schut-Welkzijn	860	Elected
41	Ingrid de Caluwé	556	Elected
42	Roald van der Linde	857	Replacement
43	Johan Houwers	3,709	Replacement
44	Joost Taverne	2,207	Replacement
45	Aukje de Vries	1,352	Replacement
46	Ronald Vuijk	204	Replacement
47	Sjoerd Potters	443	Replacement
48	Rudmer Heerema	777	Replacement
49	Hayke Veldman	728	Replacement
50	Perjan Moors	1,225	Replacement
51	Jeroen van Wijngaarden	1,974	Replacement
52	Chantal Nijkerken-de Haan	1,536	Replacement
53	Leendert de Lange	709	Replacement
54	Remco Bosma	406	Replacement
55	Nina Hofstra	576	
56	Daniël van der Ree	245	Replacement
57	Joost Helms	953	
58	Jock Geselschap	790	Replacement
59	Jeltje Hoekstra-Sikkema	631	
60	Christianne van der Wal-Zeggelink	548	
61	Bernd Roks	339	
62	Bart Smals	591	
63	Joost van Keulen	296	
64	Erik Struijlaart	353	
65	Sjoerd Osinga	169	
66	Mark Snoeren	519	
67	Hubert Koevoets	337	
68	Daniel Koerhuis	118	
69	Jasper Mos	315	
70	Tatjana Šormaz	547	
71	Baerte de Brey	254	
72	Asraa Abdullatif	704	
73	Tine Schaafsma-Buijs	792	
74	Roel Lauwerier	508	
75	Erik Koppe	2,697	
Total			

== 2: Labour Party ==
Candidate list for the Labour Party
Position	Candidate	Votes	Result
1	Diederik Samsom	1,809,856	Elected
2	Jetta Klijnsma	192,190	Elected
3	Ronald Plasterk	58,427	Elected
4	Tanja Jadnanansing	28,704	Elected
5	Jeroen Dijsselbloem	4,336	Elected
6	Mariëtte Hamer	8,744	Elected
7	Martijn van Dam	4,531	Elected
8	Frans Timmermans	15,150	Elected
9	Désirée Bonis	3,830	Elected
10	John Kerstens	3,050	Elected
11	Lutz Jacobi	16,082	Elected
12	Roos Vermeij	2,370	Elected
13	Henk Nijboer	6,448	Elected
14	Ahmed Marcouch	13,289	Elected
15	Angelien Eijsink	1,949	Elected
16	Myrthe Hilkens	2,279	Elected
17	Michiel Servaes	658	Elected
18	Lea Bouwmeester	3,451	Elected
19	Jacques Monasch	2,193	Elected
20	Mei Li Vos	8,541	Elected
21	Jeroen Recourt	789	Elected
22	Agnes Wolbert	5,207	Elected
23	Ed Groot	598	Elected
24	Attje Kuiken	3,247	Elected
25	Pierre Heijnen	896	Elected
26	Keklik Demir-Yücel	8,403	Elected
27	Tunahan Kuzu	23,067	Elected
28	Loes Ypma	2,569	Elected
29	Albert de Vries	4,664	Elected
30	Khadija Arib	6,625	Elected
31	Otwin van Dijk	6,884	Elected
32	Manon Fokke	3,732	Elected
33	Mohamed Mohandis	5,413	Elected
34	Sjoera Dikkers	871	Elected
35	Tjeerd van Dekken	5,176	Elected
36	Astrid Oosenbrug-Blokland	980	Elected
37	Jan Vos	508	Elected
38	Marit Maij	576	Elected
39	Selçuk Öztürk	9,831	Replacement
40	Grace Tanamal	867	Replacement
41	Duco Hoogland	692	Replacement
42	Sultan Günal-Gezer	1,990	Replacement
43	Roelof van Laar	392	Replacement
44	Yasemin Cegerek	3,377	Replacement
45	Yasin Torunoglu	3,277	Replacement
46	Marith Rebel-Volp	623	Replacement
47	Henk Leenders	417	Replacement
48	Joyce Vermue	626	Replacement
49	Harm Brouwer	431	Replacement
50	Amma Asante	4,549	
51	Rien van der Velde	2,339	
52	Nurten Karisli	5,243	
53	Emre Ünver	2,016	
54	Eefke Meijerink	985	
55	Alvin Riley	473	
56	Anne Koning	528	
57	Fijko van der Laan	349	
58	Anne de Rooij	338	
59	Paul van Liempd	433	
60	Marleen Haage	548	
61	Marijn van Ballegooijen	361	
62	Gritta Nottelman	284	
63	Bert Hemsteede	248	
64	Anne Marie Hoogland	256	
65	Peter de Haan	335	
66	Femke van Drooge	401	
67	Yvonne Morselt-de Ruijter	419	
68	Ward Deckers	308	
69	Anja van Zantvoort	275	
70	Marieke van Duijn	267	
71	Xander den Uijl	324	
72	Saskia den Uijl	621	
73	Mohamed Allach	1,482	
74	Maarten van Rossem	5,929	
75-79	Regional candidates		
Total			

=== Regional candidates ===
Regional candidates for Labour Party
Candidate	Votes	Result	Position																			
Candidate	Votes	Result	Groningen	Leeuwarden	Assen	Zwolle	Lelystad	Nijmegen	Arnhem	Utrecht	Amsterdam	Haarlem	Den Helder	Den Haag	Rotterdam	Dordrecht	Leiden	Middelburg	Tilburg	Den Bosch	Maastricht	Bonaire
Jamila Aanzi	368										77											
Carry Abbenhues	126					78																
Bouke Arends	375				76																	
Koen Baart	34													75								
Halima de Baedts-el Karouni	320							75														
Sascha Baggerman	133											75	75									
Achmed Baâdoud	729										79											
Yvonne Bekker	169														75							
Rinda den Besten	245									78												
Jan Willem de Boer	146												76									
Doeko Bosscher	164		75																			
Roy Bouten	385																				75	
Harlow Brammerloo	149														78							
Dick Buursink	1,135					79																
Johan Chandoe	202													77								
Marijke Drees	290		76																			
Jean Eigeman	48							77														
Wim Eilert	248		79																			
Andries Ekhart	226			76																		
Anne-Betty Evertz	123																	75				
Jop Fackeldey	88						77															
Mary Fiers	384																			75		
Willem Geerken	169								78													
Carlos Gonçalves	678														77							75
Eppo Gutteling	240								79													
Edo Haan	94																75					
Johanna Haanstra	232						78															
Yasmina Haïfi	115													76								
Hendrik Hoeksema	183																			77		
Ria Holsheimer-Wezeman	564					77																
Abeltje Hoogenkamp	58										76											
Kees Jongmans	177																		78			
Harry Keereweer	121							79														
Peter Kerris	173							76														
Joy Kisoenpersad	251			79																		
Gerrit Kleijheeg	69																78					
Jan Klop	31						75															
Marianne Kock-Smit	242								75													
Hans Kok	938					75																
Hans Konst	119			75																		
Jantine Kriens	233														79							
Jaap Kuin	241				78																	
Coby van der Laan	266			77																		
Jan Lagendijk	144															75						
Kees Lakerveld	247		77																			
Jessica van Langevelde	186																	77				
Judith Lechner	205		78																			
Bert Lubbinge	100									75												
Josan Meijers	104							78														
Marieke Moorman	435																		76			
Rein Munniksma	299				79																	
Songũl Mutluer	315												77									
Jeltje van Nieuwenhoven	139													79								76
Tineke van Nimwegen-van Wieringen	50															76						
Jeroen Nobel	91											76										
Hélène Oppatja	100																76					
Nelly den Os	77						76															
Christel van ’t Pad	135															79						
Ismail Parmaksiz	188									77												
Remco Pols	57											77										
Truus Pot-Eland	145				75																	
Jan Pronk	47													78								78
Dick van Puffelen	52															78						
Jasper Ragetlie	284																			79		
Gregor Rensen	75																77					
Ben de Reu	196																	76				
Houkje Rijpstra	238			78																		
Lia Roefs	161																				76	
Daniel Sajet	42										75											
Abdelkader Salhi	717														76							
Co van Schaik	303																	79				
Pierre Schefferlie	96															77						
Corina Schoonen	179																	78				
Arno Sent	80								76													
Jan Smeets	677																				78	
Annemieke Smit	65				77																	
Hans Spekman	860									79												79
Gaston Sporre	221					76																
Marion Suijker	249																79					
Elvira Sweet	77											78										77
Tjeerd Talsma	50												78									
Ersan Taskin	419						79															
Nicole Teeuwen	150									76												
Adnan Tekin	377										78											
Jack Vinders	845																				77	
Gaatse de Vries	154											79										
Ed Wagemaker	442												79									
Rita Weeda	76								77													
Ad van der Wegen	146																		75			
Jeroen Weyers	279																			76		
Annegien Wijnands	201																		77	78		
Marjolein de Wit-Greuter	147																		79			
Odile Wolfs	430																				79	

== 3: Party for Freedom ==
Candidate list for the Party for Freedom
Position	Candidate	Votes	Result
1	Geert Wilders	886,314	Elected
2	Fleur Agema	34,943	Elected
3	Martin Bosma	3,808	Elected
4	Lilian Helder	3,794	Elected
5	Louis Bontes	958	Elected
6	Tony van Dijck	590	Elected
7	Sietse Fritsma	644	Elected
8	Barry Madlener	829	Elected
9	Joram van Klaveren	581	Elected
10	Harm Beertema	433	Elected
11	Dion Graus	2,387	Elected
12	Reinette Klever	694	Elected
13	Roland van Vliet	1,113	Elected
14	Raymond de Roon	347	Elected
15	Machiel de Graaf	376	Elected
16	Karen Gerbrands	342	Replacement
17	Léon de Jong	435	
18	Danai van Weerdenburg	461	
19	Ino van den Besselaar	386	
20	Andre Elissen	221	
21	Vicky Maeijer	423	
22	Johan Driessen	143	
23	Willie Dille	230	
24	Daniël ter Haar	890	
25	Stephan Jansen	247	
26	Marc van den Berg	362	
27	Alexander Kops	229	
28	Edgar Mulder	531	
29	Gabriëlle Popken	210	
30	Paul ter Linden	288	
31	Gijs Moonen	84	
32	Patricia van der Kammen	627	
33	Elly Broere-Kaal	212	
34	Addie Wisse	460	
35	Yvonne Waterman	359	
36	Alexander van Hattem	213	
37	Jenny Zerfowski	210	
38	Ton van Kesteren	955	
39	Floris van Zonneveld	223	
40	Irene Joosse	265	
41	John van Assendelft	136	
42	Martin van Beek	90	
43	Willem Boutkan	76	
44	Emiel van Dijk	199	
45	Peter van Dijk	412	
46	Ronald Dol	332	
47	Johannes van Hooff	100	
48	Marcel de Graaff	157	
49	Ronald Sörensen	1,944	
Total			

== 4: Christian Democratic Appeal ==
Candidate list for the Christian Democratic Appeal
Position	Candidate	Votes	Result
1	Sybrand van Haersma Buma	517,397	Elected
2	Mona Keijzer	127,446	Elected
3	Sander de Rouwe	15,814	Elected
4	Raymond Knops	8,466	Elected
5	Michel Rog	1,382	Elected
6	Eddy van Hijum	2,719	Elected
7	Hanke Bruins Slot	3,765	Elected
8	Jaco Geurts	5,648	Elected
9	Agnes Mulder	9,824	Elected
10	Peter Oskam	702	Elected
11	Pieter Heerma	981	Elected
12	Madeleine van Toorenburg	3,558	Elected
13	Martijn van Helvert	13,952	Replacement
14	Erik Ronnes	3,985	Replacement
15	Herma Boom	2,578	
16	Mustafa Amhaouch	1,919	Replacement
17	Marieke van der Werf	809	
18	Bernard Schermers	477	
19	Patricia de Milliano-van den Hemel	6,104	
20	Marc Jager	5,237	
21	Harry van der Molen	1,196	
22	Dinand Ekkel	594	
23	Arjan Erkel	3,515	
24	Turan Yazir	4,158	
25	Michiel Holtackers	347	
26	Elske van der Mik	949	
27	Dave Ensberg-Kleijkers	678	
28	Efstathios Andreou	137	
29	Wilma van der Rijt-van der Kruis	970	
30	Ties Sweyen	732	
31	Anne-Marie Vreman-Muijrers	406	
32	Yang Soo Kloosterhof	487	
33	Nelleke Weltevrede	335	
34	Gerben Karssenberg	237	
35	Merijn Snoek	424	
36	Ebubekir Öztüre	6,003	
37	Han Hoogma	1,227	
38	Ellen Verkoelen	455	
39	Pieter Omtzigt	36,750	Elected
40	Jobke Vonk-Vedder	221	
41	Jan Eerbeek	369	
42	Dirk van der Mast	136	
43	Chantal van Steenderen-Broekhuis	228	
44	John van Hal	426	
45	Margriet van de Vooren	163	
46	Claudia Füss-Buitenhuis	397	
47	Hans Moerland	129	
48	Geeske Telgen-Swarts	326	
49	Mitra Rambaran	442	
50	Jan Kramer	404	
51	Jeffrey van Agtmaal	820	
52	Fons d’ Haens	1,246	
53	Remko ten Barge	2,918	
54	Jan-Jaap de Haan	177	
55	Gert Boeve	105	
56	Erik de Ridder	205	
57	Hugo de Jonge	545	
Total			

== 5: Socialist Party ==
Candidate list for the Socialist Party
Position	Candidate	Votes	Result
1	Emile Roemer	755,765	Elected
2	Renske Leijten	69,146	Elected
3	Ronald van Raak	4,527	Elected
4	Harry van Bommel	10,021	Elected
5	Jan de Wit	8,977	Elected
6	Sadet Karabulut	10,572	Elected
7	Sharon Gesthuizen	5,155	Elected
8	Jasper van Dijk	1,506	Elected
9	Paul Ulenbelt	958	Elected
10	Henk van Gerven	2,111	Elected
11	Manja Smits	2,783	Elected
12	Paulus Jansen	994	Elected
13	Farshad Bashir	2,065	Elected
14	Nine Kooiman	1,435	Elected
15	Arnold Merkies	343	Elected
16	Eric Smaling	626	Replacement
17	Michiel van Nispen	1,206	Replacement
18	Tjitske Siderius	3,009	Replacement
19	Leo de Kleijn	1,393	
20	Ike Teuling	1,434	
21	Nicole van Gemert	1,469	
22	Henri Swinkels	880	
23	Maureen van der Pligt	871	
24	Maarten Hijink	283	
25	Tiers Bakker	400	
26	Erik de Vries	982	
27	Daniël de Wit	417	
28	Anneke Wezel	589	
29	Thijs Coppus	1,443	
30	Meta Meijer	359	
31	Patrick van Lunteren	441	
32	Chris Schaeffer	130	
33	Femke Reudler Talsma	400	
34	Hugo Polderman	360	
35	Peter Kwint	290	
36	Pim Siegers	1,035	
37	Lies van Aelst	598	
38	Bart van Kent	149	
39	Niels Jongerius	175	
40	Lieke van Rossum	691	
41	Hans Martin Don	500	
42	Eelco Eikenaar	1,360	
43	Willem Bouman	584	
44	Trix de Roos-Consemulder	1,613	
45	Jamila Yahyaoui	1,803	
46-50	Regional candidates		
Total			

=== Regional candidates ===
Regional candidates for Socialist Party
Candidate	Votes	Result	Position						
Candidate	Votes	Result	Groningen, Leeuwarden, Assen	Zwolle, Lelystad, Utrecht	Nijmegen, Arnhem	Amsterdam, Haarlem, Den Helder	Den Haag, Rotterdam	Dordrecht, Leiden, Middelburg	Tilburg, Den Bosch, Maastricht, Bonaire
Saíd Afalah	997		48			47	48	48	48
René Allart	211							50	
Richard Boddeus	137			48					
Jan Broekema	638		49						
Tuur Elzinga	308					50			
Ton Heerschop	617								50
Jos van der Horst	1,103		50	47		49	49		
Matthias van Hunnik	688				50				
Frans Mulckhuijse	208			49					
Vincent Mulder	1,753			50					
Nils Müller	217				49				
Diederik Olders	273				48		50		
Bert Peterse	518		46	46	46		46	46	46
Robin van der Velden	122				47	48		49	49
Arjan Vliegenthart	215		47			46	47	47	47

== 6: Democrats 66 ==
Candidate list for the Democrats 66
Position	Candidate	Votes	Result
1	Alexander Pechtold	586,454	Elected
2	Stientje van Veldhoven	71,170	Elected
3	Wouter Koolmees	10,413	Elected
4	Kees Verhoeven	3,594	Elected
5	Vera Bergkamp	15,387	Elected
6	Gerard Schouw	1,435	Elected
7	Paul van Meenen	1,802	Elected
8	Steven van Weyenberg	989	Elected
9	Pia Dijkstra	24,886	Elected
10	Magda Berndsen-Jansen	2,472	Elected
11	Sjoerd Sjoerdsma	1,569	Elected
12	Wassila Hachchi	4,737	Elected
13	Fatma Koşer-Kaya	5,117	Replacement
14	Judith Swinkels	2,151	Replacement
15	Salima Belhaj	2,345	Replacement
16	Maarten Groothuizen	1,264	
17	Michiel Verkoulen	1,086	
18	Femke Dingemans	1,903	
19	Ton Monasso	510	
20	Jacqueline Versteeg	811	
21	Paul de Beer	890	
22	Thessa van der Windt	838	
23	Bart Vink	485	
24	Gökhan Çoban	1,625	
25	Eelco Keij	1,620	
26	Guido Corten	1,252	
27	Frank van Oirschot	214	
28	Sina Salim	377	
29	Doede de Vries	1,627	
30	Anneke Groen	478	
31	Hélène Steenhoff	243	
32	Thomas Walder	649	
33	Bart van Grevenhof	144	
34	Pim de Kuijer	172	
35	Caecilia van Peski	460	
36	Sabine Verschoor	455	
37	Michiel Rijsberman	236	
38	Joost Koomen	165	
39	Bastiaan Winkel	210	
40	Dilia Leitner	210	
41	Robert van Asten	256	
42	Ellenus Venema	358	
43	Joris Visser	193	
44	Huub Halsema	300	
45	Gijs van Loef	140	
46	Kees de Zeeuw	236	
47	Laurens Verspuij	162	
48	Pieter de Groene	160	
49	Linda Carton	474	
50	Rineke Gieske-Mastenbroek	2,367	
Total			

== 7: GroenLinks ==
Candidate list for the GroenLinks
Position	Candidate	Votes	Result
1	Jolande Sap	171,971	Elected
2	Bram van Ojik	4,639	Elected
3	Liesbeth van Tongeren	10,205	Elected
4	Jesse Klaver	3,351	Elected
5	Linda Voortman	4,477	Replacement
6	Rik Grashoff	1,764	Replacement
7	Arjan El Fassed	1,481	
8	Niels van den Berge	488	
9	Corinne Ellemeet	1,127	Replacement
10	Tofik Dibi	5,400	
11	Paulus de Wilt	248	
12	Hayat Barrahmun	1,440	
13	Kees Diepeveen	282	
14	Anne Scheltema Beduin	714	
15	Dirk van den Bosch	177	
16	Huri Sahin	860	
17	Lisa Westerveld	1,458	
18	Inge Vianen	434	
19	Marry Mos	342	
20	Miguel Heilbron	326	
21	Volkert Vintges	245	
22	Christiaan Kwint	191	
23	Jan van de Venis	162	
24	Bert Jongert	169	
25	Carel Bruring	310	
26	Irona Groeneveld	578	
27	Karin Dekker	791	
28	Gea Smith	333	
29	Henk Nijhof	368	
30	Sebastiaan van ’t Erve	137	
31	Ruud Pet	172	
32	Pascalle Georgopoulos	226	
33	Ahmed Harika	419	
34	Thijs de la Court	179	
35	Bart Eigeman	419	
36	Gerdo van Grootheest	369	
37	Judith Sargentini	246	
38	Bas Eickhout	159	
39	Marije Cornelissen	130	
40	Kathalijne Buitenweg	573	
41	Pascal ten Have	148	
42	Andrée van Es	2,388	
Total			

== 8: Christian Union ==
Candidate list for the Christian Union
Position	Candidate	Votes	Result
1	Arie Slob	229,664	Elected
2	Joël Voordewind	13,877	Elected
3	Carola Schouten	16,507	Elected
4	Gert-Jan Segers	2,992	Elected
5	Carla Dik-Faber	2,604	Elected
6	Eppo Bruins	1,152	Replacement
7	Herman Wegter	4,672	
8	Anja Haga	2,262	
9	Ixora Balootje	2,111	
10	Ard Kleijer	923	
11	Jan de Wit	457	
12	Martine Vonk	1,230	
13	Bert Tijhof	1,338	
14	Paul Blokhuis	615	
15	Arnout van Kempen	370	
16	Jacqueline Koops-Scheele	278	
17	Onno van Schayck	307	
18	Hugo Scherff	443	
19	Harmke Vlieg-Kempe	637	
20	Ben Visser	540	
21	Hugo Veldhuizen	142	
22	Stieneke van der Graaf	875	
23	Hermen Vreugdenhil	236	
24	Piet Adema	502	
25	Arjan Beekman	941	
26	Jurgen van Houdt	370	
27	Remco van Mulligen	216	
28	Jet Weigand-Timmer	164	
29	Reinier Koppelaar	145	
30	Janny Joosten-Leijendekker	244	
31	Mirjam Bikker	298	
32	Pieter Plug	267	
33	Bert Koops	251	
34	Martin Schuurman	124	
35	Klaas Harink	254	
36	Reinier van Hoffen	116	
37	Ron de Rover	207	
38	Marjolein Busstra	140	
39	Simone Kennedy-Doornbos	175	
40	Arne Schaddelee	168	
41	André Oldenkamp	103	
42	Jaap van Ginkel	145	
43	Bart Jaspers Faijer	265	
44	Ed Anker	225	
45	Jantien Fröling-Kok	184	
46	Freek Dommerholt	202	
47	Frank Visser	245	
48	Dick Schutte	141	
49	Orlando Bottenbley	2,333	
50	Arie van der Veer	1,929	
Total			

== 9: Reformed Political Party ==
Number	Candidate	Votes	Result
1	Kees van der Staaij	182,189	Elected
2	Elbert Dijkgraaf	5,436	Elected
3	Roelof Bisschop	2,234	Elected
4	Servaas Stoop	765	
5	Hans Tanis	347	
6	Diederik van Dijk	243	
7	Geert Schipaanboord	486	
8	Arnold Weggeman	256	
9	Wim van Duijn	598	
10	Peter Zevenbergen	204	
11	Christan van Bemmel	204	
12	Leendert de Knegt	426	
13	Sytse de Jong	321	
14	Rien Bogerd	519	
15	Dick van Meeuwen	216	
16	Teun van Oostenbrugge	354	
17	Ewart Bosma	583	
18	Jan Joeverman	103	
19	Tom Bakker	137	
20	Richard Donk	91	
21	Jan Luteijn	94	
22	Marcel de Haas	104	
23	Leo Barth	81	
24	Peter Schalk	146	
25	Wim van Wikselaar	84	
26	Henk Kievit	84	
27	Ad Dorst	262	
28	Henk Massink	75	
29	Wim de Vries	134	
30	Jan Willem Benschop	304	
Total			

== 10: Party for the Animals ==
Candidate list for the Party for the Animals
Position	Candidate	Votes	Result
1	Marianne Thieme	154,155	Elected
2	Esther Ouwehand	11,573	Elected
3	Frank Wassenberg	2,677	
4	Anja Hazekamp	1,575	
5	Johnas van Lammeren	1,320	
6	Bram van Liere	620	
7	Birgit Verstappen	844	
8	Gerjan Kelder	693	
9	Luuk van der Veer	450	
10	Diederik van Liere	444	
11	Ida Been	651	
12	Corinne Cornelisse	538	
13	Trees Janssens	601	
14	Annemarie van Gelder	548	
15	Harry Voss	642	
16	Marieke de Groot	734	
17	Floriske van Leeuwen	375	
18	Ton Dekker	328	
19	Erno Eskens	234	
20	Pablo Moleman	330	
21	Melissa Bax	425	
22	Ingrid Ramaan	579	
23	Laura Straver	389	
24	Janet de Jong	440	
25	Jan Peter Cruiming	997	
Total			

== 11: Pirate Party ==
Candidate list for the Pirate Party
Position	Candidate	Votes	Result
1	Dirk Poot	23,581	
2	Danny Palic	788	
3	Rodger van Doorn	474	
4	Patriek Lesparre	334	
5	Catharina Bethlehem	2,138	
6	David van Deijk	664	
7	Roberto Moretti	404	
8	Jan Hopmans	372	
9	Dylan Hallegraeff	375	
10	Mark Jansen	586	
11	Samir Allioui	884	
Total			

== 12: Party for Human and Spirit ==
Candidate list for the Party for Human and Spirit
Position	Candidate	Votes	Result
1	Lea Manders	14,280	
2	Leo Sonneveld	553	
3	Hans van Steenbergen	232	
4	Ruud Verdonk	213	
5	Erika Mauritz	347	
6	Ferdinand Zanda	194	
7	Peter Hendriksen	149	
8	Trix Kruger	129	
9	Martin Smeets	237	
10	Bianca Fens	138	
11	Alja Hoeksema	89	
12	Pauline Laumans	163	
13	Wayne Mosher	48	
14	Baukje Simons	73	
15	Janine van Twist	77	
16	Peter den Boer	44	
17	Anna van der Heijden	137	
18	Sung Bruijnen	41	
19	Vera Koenen	72	
20	Rieky Peeters	40	
21	Ron Houweling	70	
22	Louis Bervoets	108	
23	Arend Lammertink	34	
24	Robert Greuter	38	
25	Jos Gulikers	115	
26	Micha Kuiper	37	
27	Patrick Sakes	46	
28	Rascha Wisse	32	
29	Sayma Kuipers	59	
30	Laura Greijn	46	
31	Ingmar Deenen	15	
32	Mahmoud Ibrahim	96	
33	Dick Westra	45	
34	Rilana Hyndycz	119	
35	Roelof Timmer	36	
36	Menno Laaning	48	
37	Jan Razenberg	110	
Total			

== 13: Netherlands Local ==
Candidate list for the Netherlands Local
Position	Candidate	Votes	Result
1	Ton Schijvenaars	1,025	
2-36	Regional candidates		
37	Bert Euser	40	
Total			

=== Regional candidates ===
Regional candidates for Netherlands Local
Candidate	Votes	Result	Position																			
Candidate	Votes	Result	Groningen	Leeuwarden	Assen	Zwolle	Lelystad	Nijmegen	Arnhem	Utrecht	Amsterdam	Haarlem	Den Helder	Den Haag	Rotterdam	Dordrecht	Leiden	Middelburg	Tilburg	Den Bosch	Maastricht	Bonaire
Mostafa Abbou	119		33	33	33	33	33	23	27	25	25	30	30	35	22	18	19	18	3	3	5	17
Maan Arkenbosch	39		35	35	35	35	35	35	24	35	23	27	27	32	35	24	35	24	17	5	2	19
Ed Arnold	10		26	26	26	26	26	12	13	15	16	21	22	9	3	7	11	11	14	17	17	4
Hendrie van Assem	46		13	13	13	17	17	15	7	2	5	5	8	11	11	11	4	16	20	20	19	28
Sierd de Boer	45		8	3	8	6	5	20	20	19	18	8	6	20	25	27	25	27	31	32	35	20
Fred de Groot	30		9	4	9	7	6	21	21	20	19	9	7	21	26	28	26	28	32	33	36	24
Ron de Haan	104		16	16	16	15	2	17	17	5	2	3	2	17	17	20	14	20	21	34	26	36
Jean-Paul Hageman	108		27	27	27	27	27	27	31	27	34	34	34	14	14	14	21	2	5	8	9	30
Albert Holtland	19		11	11	11	3	13	5	5	22	21	11	15	23	28	30	28	30	26	24	23	16
Louis van der Kallen	24		31	31	31	31	31	26	30	17	28	33	33	13	13	13	13	13	36	36	8	27
Marek Karczewski	15		22	22	22	21	22	14	15	14	12	20	20	2	6	10	8	9	16	16	29	31
Hedy Kaufmann	55		21	21	21	22	21	8	9	10	11	16	24	5	5	3	6	6	10	12	13	7
Casper Kloos	57		5	6	3	12	11	34	23	34	33	26	13	31	34	36	34	36	29	27	30	22
John Kolenbrander	48		18	18	18	18	18	16	16	4	3	2	4	10	10	9	3	15	19	19	25	34
Jan de Koning	49		19	19	19	19	19	13	14	3	6	6	19	3	9	8	2	14	15	18	18	33
Gerard Kox	35		15	15	15	14	16	3	3	8	9	14	18	26	20	23	17	23	24	22	21	35
René Kraaijenbrink	30		4	5	2	11	10	33	22	33	32	25	12	30	33	35	33	35	28	26	28	15
Emma Kraak	42		28	28	28	28	28	28	32	28	35	35	35	15	15	15	22	3	7	9	10	8
Teus Meijdam	21		24	24	24	24	24	10	11	12	14	18	26	7	8	5	9	8	12	14	15	26
Hein Mekelenkamp	19		12	12	12	4	14	6	6	23	22	12	16	24	29	31	29	31	27	25	24	11
Jan Ooms	21		30	30	30	30	30	25	29	16	27	32	32	12	12	12	12	12	6	7	7	18
Kees van Pelt	46		25	25	25	25	25	11	12	13	15	19	21	8	2	6	10	10	13	15	16	2
Khalid Ramdani	86		36	36	36	36	36	36	25	36	7	28	28	33	36	25	36	25	18	6	3	12
Michael Rieter	32		32	32	32	32	32	22	26	24	24	29	29	34	21	17	18	17	2	2	4	25
Theo Schoenmakers	36		20	20	20	20	20	7	8	9	10	15	23	4	4	2	5	5	9	11	12	21
Jos Schouwenaar	19		29	29	29	29	29	29	33	29	36	36	36	16	16	16	23	4	8	10	11	29
Sonja Schreuder	44		3	8	5	9	8	31	35	31	30	23	10	28	31	33	31	33	34	29	32	3
Mariska Sloot	150		2	7	4	8	7	30	34	30	29	22	9	27	30	32	30	32	33	28	31	5
Erik van Stuijvenberg	18		23	23	23	23	23	9	10	11	13	17	25	6	7	4	7	7	11	13	14	23
Dirk Tuithof	72		7	2	7	5	4	19	19	18	17	7	5	19	24	26	24	26	30	31	34	13
Tijmen Valkering	30		17	17	17	16	3	18	18	6	4	4	3	18	18	21	15	21	22	35	27	32
Ytsen van der Velde	23		6	9	6	10	9	32	36	32	31	24	11	29	32	34	32	34	35	30	33	14
Henriëtte Verouden-Berens	36		34	34	34	34	34	24	28	26	26	31	31	36	23	19	20	19	4	4	6	6
Peter van Vlaanderen	161		10	10	10	2	12	4	4	21	20	10	14	22	27	29	27	29	25	23	22	10
Dirk Willink	88		14	14	14	13	15	2	2	7	8	13	17	25	19	22	16	22	23	21	20	9

== 14: Libertarian Party ==
Candidate list for the Libertarian Party
Position	Candidate	Votes	Result
1	Toine Manders	2,716	
2	Quintus Backhuijs	146	
3	Kim Winkelaar	181	
4	Mik Brokke	32	
5	Sujatha de Poel	41	
6	Kim Tjoa	71	
7	Harry van Dijken	69	
8	Victor van der Sterren	86	
9	Bart Voorn	57	
10	Marjan Wijbenga	55	
11	Mario Aandewiel	24	
12	René Hartman	41	
13	Herma Beune	17	
14	Henry Sturman	28	
15	Hendrik Brouwer	20	
16	Yernaz Ramautarsing	32	
17	Albert Spits	32	
18	Peter Dijkstra	26	
19	Frans Wijgergangs	14	
20	Ronald Bijl	37	
21	Jeroen van Driel	13	
22	Imre Wessels	24	
23	Riekus de Poel	19	
24	Lukas Teijema	8	
25	Pallieter Koopmans	17	
26	Peter Beukelman	13	
27	Arthur van der Linden	14	
28	Leendert Ambtman	12	
29	Kader el Oufir	25	
30	Joep van Dijken	4	
31	Rob van Glabbeek	5	
32	Otto Vrijhof	2	
33	Max Nuijens	5	
34	Ron Arends	23	
35	Hein Dauven	16	
36	Luc van der Stegen	8	
37	Karel Knispel	10	
38	Pascal Elzinga	5	
39	Simone Pailer	24	
40	Harry Stulemeijer	5	
41	Anthony Katgert	35	
42	Corné van Straten	16	
43	Marian Aletta Does	9	
44	Peter Croughs	6	
45	Marina Mosink	16	
46	Lennart de Winter	18	
47	Diederik Sakkers	3	
48	Mels de Zeeuw	21	
49	Karel Beckman	13	
50	Frank Karsten	49	
Total			

== 15: Democratic Political Turning Point ==
Candidate list for the Democratic Political Turning Point
Position	Candidate	Votes	Result
1	Hero Brinkman	5,679	
2	R.D. Strijk	135	
3	J. Winters	237	
4	J.A.M. Arntz	78	
5	M.L. Hagen	39	
6	P.M. van Benten	47	
7	C.A. Hottentot	55	
8	J.F.M. van Puijenbroek	65	
9	A. van der Velde	76	
10	R.G.J. Reker	57	
11	F.G. van Wijnen	29	
12	H.J.M. Poppelier	27	
13	B. Groos	52	
14	J.W. Muijs	24	
15	S.T.T. Jonkergouw	14	
16	H. van Zielst	32	
17	A.J.B. Geurtz	31	
18	T.S. Scargo	8	
19	S.J.M. Driesen	20	
20	A.G.H.M. Lammertink	32	
21	P.O. Plantinga	42	
22	J.G.E. Keetels	15	
23	L.T. Klinkert	10	
24	J.J. van der Starre	20	
25	A.P.D. van den Raadt	16	
26	C.P. Pater	39	
27	R.G. Bol	13	
28	C.C.A. Boxma-Heij	17	
29	H.D. Baldwin	24	
30	A.A.A. Jansen	11	
31	M.M. Kokshoorn	11	
32	W.J. Jongenelis	13	
33	N.D. Bakker	32	
34	R.P. van der Zee	11	
35	M.M.M. Wiedijk	23	
36	J.C.P. van Gorp	19	
37	G.W. Husmans	13	
38	J.J. Havik-Schaft	16	
39	J.M.G. Stevens	34	
40	M.E. Boersma	17	
41	H.B. van Schepen	58	
42	G. Bakker	18	
43	D.F.M. Dubois-Veenhuis	19	
44	A.E.G. de Jong	9	
45	J.L. van Aert	12	
46	P. Schilt	12	
47	R.L.H. Haarsma	18	
48	M.M. van Wijnen-Barendregt	8	
49	T.W.A. Reijnen	24	
50	D.J. Keijser	52	
Total			

== 16: 50PLUS ==
Candidate list for 50PLUS
Position	Candidate	Votes	Result
1	Henk Krol	148,273	Elected
2	Norbert Klein	3,511	Elected
3	Martine Baay-Timmerman	7,123	Replacement
4	Willem Herrebrugh	816	
5	Wim van Overveld	845	
6	Roy Ho Ten Soeng	2,654	
7	Monique van de Griendt	1,941	
8	Harry Siepel	997	
9	Harry Lamberts	722	
10	Mieke Hoek	511	
11	Astrid Woldinga	705	
12	John Struijlaard	976	
13	Rob Hompe	1,097	
14	Gerda Karmelk-Brom	477	
15	Willem Willemse	715	
16	Jeannette de Caluwe	804	
17	Kees van de Molengraft	453	
18	Guido Brandt Corstius	288	
19	Jan-Dirk van Arkel	188	
20	Wil van Soest	319	
21	Frits Colnot	131	
22	Peter Pont	292	
23	Lidie Tax-Philippi	107	
24	Dick Schouw	350	
25	Stefano Erba	79	
26	Piet van ’t Wout	577	
27	Harry de Groot	373	
28	Peter Prins	111	
29	Horst Oosterveer	117	
30	Chris Bakker	185	
31	Frans Dor	180	
32	Ton Luiting	118	
33	Hylke ten Cate	446	
34	Jan Nagel	1,150	
Total			

== 17: Liberal Democratic Party ==
Candidate list for the Liberal Democratic Party
Position	Candidate	Votes	Result
1	Sammy van Tuyll van Serooskerken	1,286	
2	Petra de Boevere	268	
3	Rikkert Visser	67	
4	Bart van Teeffelen	33	
5	Jaap van Eenennaam	35	
6	Eleonore Witteveen	68	
7	Harm Dorenbos	16	
8	Martijn Rosdorff	12	
9	Rob de Best	22	
10	Frits van Endhoven	23	
11	Marcel Breet	16	
12	Sander van den Broeke	16	
13	Ewout Lubberman	19	
14	Frank van Berkel	9	
15	Lisanne Hölscher	8	
16	Bas van den Berg	13	
17	Ben Hilberts	9	
18	Caroline Besjes-de Ruiter	22	
19	Jan Bert de Vries	11	
20	Mieke van Kleef	11	
21	Peter Visser	8	
22	Ingeborg van Kempen	14	
23	Hans Berends	8	
24	Diethild Frisch	10	
25	Bram Borst	13	
26	Jan Jaap ten Hoor	7	
27	Wolf van Ittersum	17	
28	Gijs Meerman	9	
29	Huub Zweers	4	
30	Willem Dijs	5	
31	Paul Witteveen	6	
32	Dirk Cohen Tervaert	6	
33	Frank Ankersmit	55	
Total			

== 18: Anti Europe Party ==
Candidate list for the Anti Europe Party
Position	Candidate	Votes	Result
1	Arnold Reinten	1,287	
2-8	Regional candidates		
Total			

=== Regional candidates ===
Regional candidates for Anti Europe Party
Candidate	Votes	Result	Position		
Candidate	Votes	Result	Groningen, Leeuwarden	Other	Bonaire
Frans Bergwerf	78		4	4	
Frits van Dam	205		5	5	
Gerrie de Jongh-Gijsberts	285		2	2	
Sigfried Molina	33				5
Claudia-Johanna Pieron	4		7		4
Jack Rijnders	96		3	3	2
Elisabeth Smit-Kamphorst	4		6		
Anand Soekhoe	0				3
Carla de Vries	21		8		

== 19: SOPN ==
Candidate list for the SOPN
Position	Candidate	Votes	Result
1	Johan Oldenkamp	9,636	
2	Hanneke Bijl	736	
3	Geert Vousten	148	
4	Tabitha Wasbauer	62	
5	Elbert Westerbeek	93	
6	Wilma Verberk	67	
7	Paul Baltink	90	
8	Gaby van Wijlen	90	
9	Sjaak Bruijsten	36	
10	Ilse Huberts-Donker	48	
11	Shahir Eshaqzai	82	
12	Yvonne Smit	53	
13	Maurice Wasbauer	16	
14	Bea van Kessel	37	
15	Kees van Wegen	23	
16	Mylène Höhle	23	
17	Geert-Jan van der Wolf	28	
18	Gerry Zaremba	24	
19	Jan van der Gragt	83	
20	Farida Gillot	33	
21	Melvin Botermans	46	
22	Cathalijne Zoete	53	
23	Jeroen Arents	64	
24	Lisette van Rooij	52	
25	Henk de Wilde	24	
26	Nynke Muntendam	42	
27	John Rijkens	20	
28	Marijke Kattenberg-Toet	36	
29	Kees de Zeeuw	19	
30	Helen Smit	27	
31	Kaspar Hakkesteegt	10	
32	Pierre Schreuder	12	
33	Lianne Hermers	22	
34	Marjo van den Heuvel	12	
35	Arthur van den Anker	14	
36	Syne Fonk	30	
37	Jan Krop	18	
38	Anton Teuben	251	
39	Rob Brockhus	40	
40-50	Regional candidates		
Total			

=== Regional candidates ===
Regional candidates for SOPN
Candidate	Votes	Result	Position							
Candidate	Votes	Result	Groningen, Leeuwarden, Assen, Zwolle	Lelystad	Nijmegen, Arnhem	Utrecht, Amsterdam	Haarlem, Den Helder	Den Haag, Rotterdam, Dordrecht, Leide	Middelburg, Maastricht	Tilburg, Den Bosch
Camiel Anjema	25						49	49		
Richard Beems	26									40
Richard Beusink	19		40	40	40	40	40	40	40	
Sybelle Bezemer	6								48	
Linda van de Bildt	3					46				
Sible Brandsma	37		42	42	42		42			
Theo Burchartz	17							42		
Bert Dalman	3								42	
Jaco van Dieren	25		50							
Pascal Dolleman	6		45	45	45				45	
Rinaldo Ekhorst	0			49						
Henk Fitters	10				49					49
Frank de Graaf	12		43	43	43	43	43			
Jan van Groenewoud	37			47		45	46			
Chris Heidotting	7		46							
Mayk Hoekman	3								46	46
Maarten Horst	97					50	50	50	50	
Omar Iskandarani	12		47							
André Lasut	131		41	41	41	41	41	41	41	
Roy Leenders	12		48	48	48	48		48		
Gideon Leupen	42									41
Dimfy van Liempd	7									45
Gil Lont	37						48	47		
Jora Matthijsen	22				46					50
Gretha Muller-Beukeveld	4		49							
Paco van de Plasse	16				50					48
Ad van Rooij	17				47					47
Menno Rosenboom	15						47	46		
Ralph Schippers	15							43		
Petra Selis	14								49	
Rene Strobos	13		44	46		42				
Charlotte Stroosnijder	39			50		47				
Danny van Tienen	13			44	44	44	44	44	44	44
Auktje Veldhuis	10						45	45		
Michel Vitaliti	8					49				
Laurens Wouters	18								47	43
Michael Wuhl	4								43	42

== 20: Party of the Future ==
Candidate list for the Party of the Future
Position	Candidate	Votes	Result
1	Johan Vlemmix	5,453	
2	Erik Schampers	409	
3	Jolanda Verburg	464	
4	Henrick Fabius	100	
5	Monique Sparla	123	
6	Chris Hellenbrand	101	
7	Helen Roeten	151	
8	Khalid Ahmed Chaudry	141	
9	David Berg	48	
10	Han Altena	47	
11	Dyana Hoedemaker	90	
12	Theo Jansen	103	
13	Jos Bron	73	
14	Ron Smit	42	
15-24	Regional candidates		
Total			

=== Regional candidates ===
Regional candidates for Party of the Future
Candidate	Votes	Result	Position	
Candidate	Votes	Result	1	2
Ben Crouwel	10			15
Manon Goslinga	102		20	21
Dick de Groot	46		19	20
Carlo van Kuijck	27		18	19
Martin van Leeuwen	63		21	22
Mischa Martherus	365		23	24
Gerda Petersen	88		22	23
Ans Schmitz-Broeren	44		16	17
Wendy Smits	58		17	18
Evert-Herman Veenhuizen	46		15	16

== 21: NXD ==
Candidate list for the NXD
Position	Candidate	Votes	Result
1	P.S. Samlal	44	
2	S. Angnoe	4	
3	N.P.S. Samlal	6	
4	X.P.S. Samlal	0	
5	R. Krishnasing	8	
Total			

== See also ==
- List of members of the House of Representatives of the Netherlands, 2012–2017

== Source ==
- Kiesraad (17 September 2012). "Uitslag Tweede Kamerverkiezing 2012" (PDF) (in Dutch).
