= Perjan Moors =

Dutch politician

Member of the House of Representatives of the Netherlands
- In office 14 January 2014 – 23 March 2017

Personal details
- Born: 20 October 1967 (age 58) Nijmegen, Netherlands
- Party: People's Party for Freedom and Democracy

Perjan Moors (born 20 October 1967 in Nijmegen) is a Dutch politician. He was a member of the House of Representatives of the Netherlands for the People's Party for Freedom and Democracy between 14 January 2014 and 23 March 2017. He replaced Matthijs Huizing, who left the House of Representatives on 6 December 2013.

Moors studied technical computer science at Delft University of Technology, graduating in 1996. He worked as project manager for several years and in 2010 he became municipal councillor of Houten.

Moors entered the House of Representatives when Matthijs Huizing resigned in December 2013. Johan Houwers and Hayke Veldman, two higher ranked candidates on the party list, earlier declined to fill the vacancy.
