= Robert van Asten =

Dutch politician

- Van Asten in 2026

Member of the House of Representatives
- Incumbent
- Assumed office 12 November 2025

Deputy Mayor of The Hague
- In office 27 September 2022 – 12 November 2025
- Mayor: Jan van Zanen

Alderman in The Hague
- In office 7 June 2018 – 12 November 2025

Member of The Hague Municipal Council
- In office 27 March 2014 – 7 June 2018

Personal details
- Born: Robert Jacobus van Asten; 30 November 1978 (age 47) Voorburg, Netherlands
- Party: Democrats 66
- Education: Leiden University
- Occupation: Jurist; tax advisor; politician

Robert Jacobus van Asten (born 30 November 1978) is a Dutch tax lawyer, administrator and D66 politician. He has been an alderman of The Hague since 7 June 2018 and deputy mayor of The Hague since 27 September 2022.

== Biography ==
Van Asten was born in Voorburg and raised in Rijswijk. From 1991 to 1997, he attended atheneum at St Stanislas College in Delft. From 1997 to 2005, he studied tax law at Leiden University. From 2002 to 2004, he worked as a tour guide for GoGo Tours. From 2005 to 2010, he worked as a tax advisor at Deloitte in Rotterdam.

From 2010 to 2015, Van Asten worked as a solicitor at Vistra in both Amsterdam-Zuid and at Schiphol Airport. From 2016 to 2018, he worked as a fundraiser for D66 at the national office in The Hague. From 2015 to 2018, he ran his own consultancy as a self-employed person.

Van Asten was a candidate for the 2010 Dutch municipal elections in The Hague. In 2012 he was a candidate for the House of Representatives in the 2012 Dutch general election. From 2010 to 2013 he was a board member and chairman of the Hague branch of D66. He was campaign leader for the 2014 Dutch municipal elections.

Van Asten was a member of the city council of The Hague from 2014 to 2018, from 2015 as chairman of the D66 faction. Since 7 June 2018 he has been an alderman of The Hague and since 19 December 2019 his portfolio was Mobility, Culture and Strategy. Since 27 September 2022 his portfolio was Urban Development, Strategy, Europe and the Segbroek district and he is deputy mayor.

Van Asten lives with his partner.

== See also ==
- List of candidates in the 2012 Dutch general election
- List of candidates in the 2025 Dutch general election
