= Judith Merkies =

Dutch politician (born 1966)

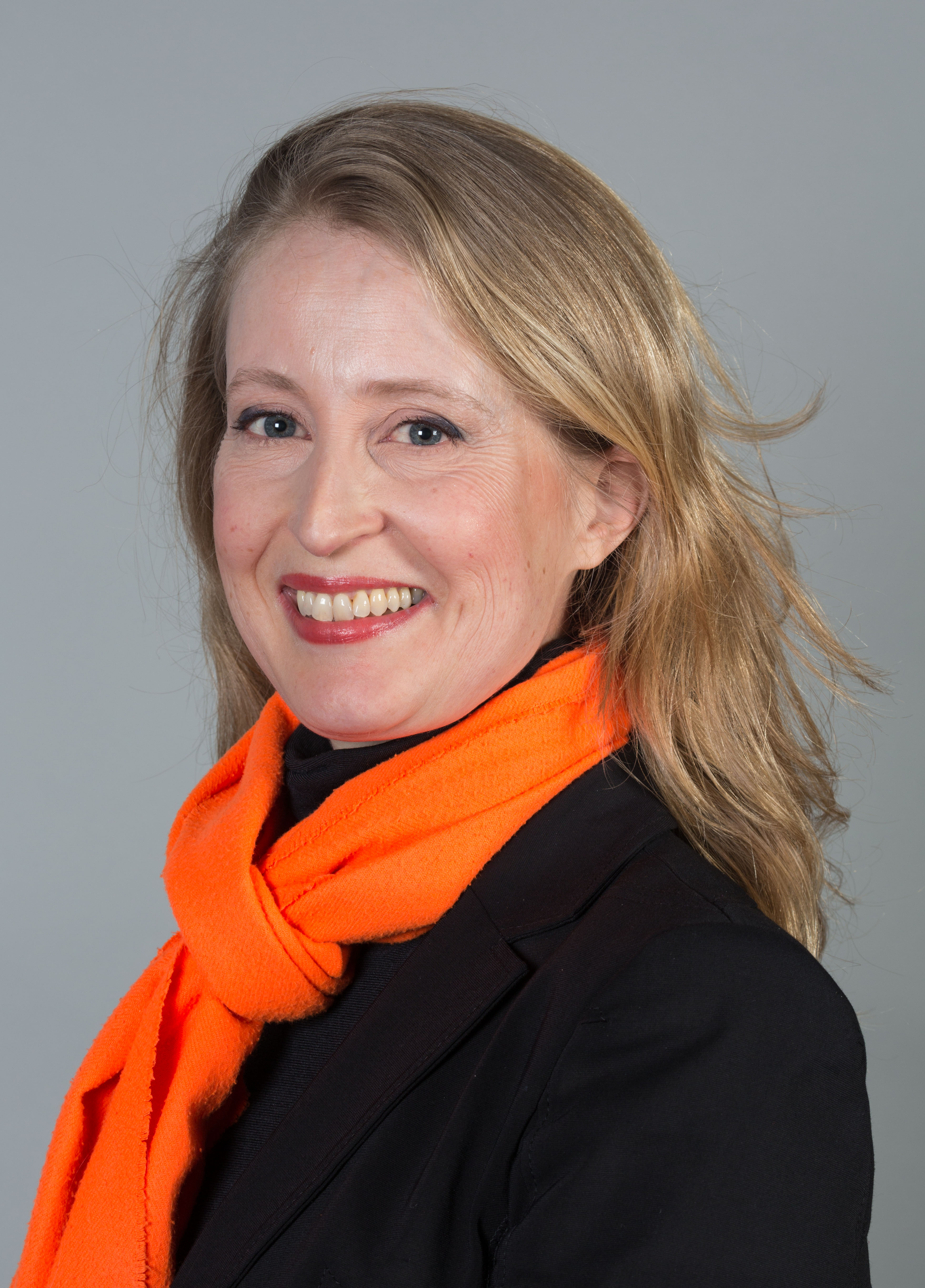
Judith Merkies (2014)

J.A. "Judith" Merkies (born 28 September 1966 in London, Ontario, Canada) is a Dutch politician for the Labour Party (Partij van de Arbeid - PvdA) who served as a Member of the European Parliament from 2009 until 2014.

Merkies graduated with a law degree from the University of Amsterdam and pursued a career as a lawyer before taking on post-graduate studies in European and International Law at the same university. Merkies has worked for the institutions of the European Union as well as for various industries. Prior to becoming a Member of the European Parliament Merkies worked as a Project Manager for the Education, Audiovisual & Culture Executive Agency (EACEA) of the European Commission. From 2005 to 2006 she worked as an executive manager at the European Music Office, an international non-profit association bringing together professional organizations, associations and federations from the music sector within the European Union. From 2000 to 2004 she worked as a representative of professionals and companies in the Dutch film industry.

Judith Merkies is a sister of SP politician Arnold Merkies.
