= Marith Volp =

Dutch politician and physician

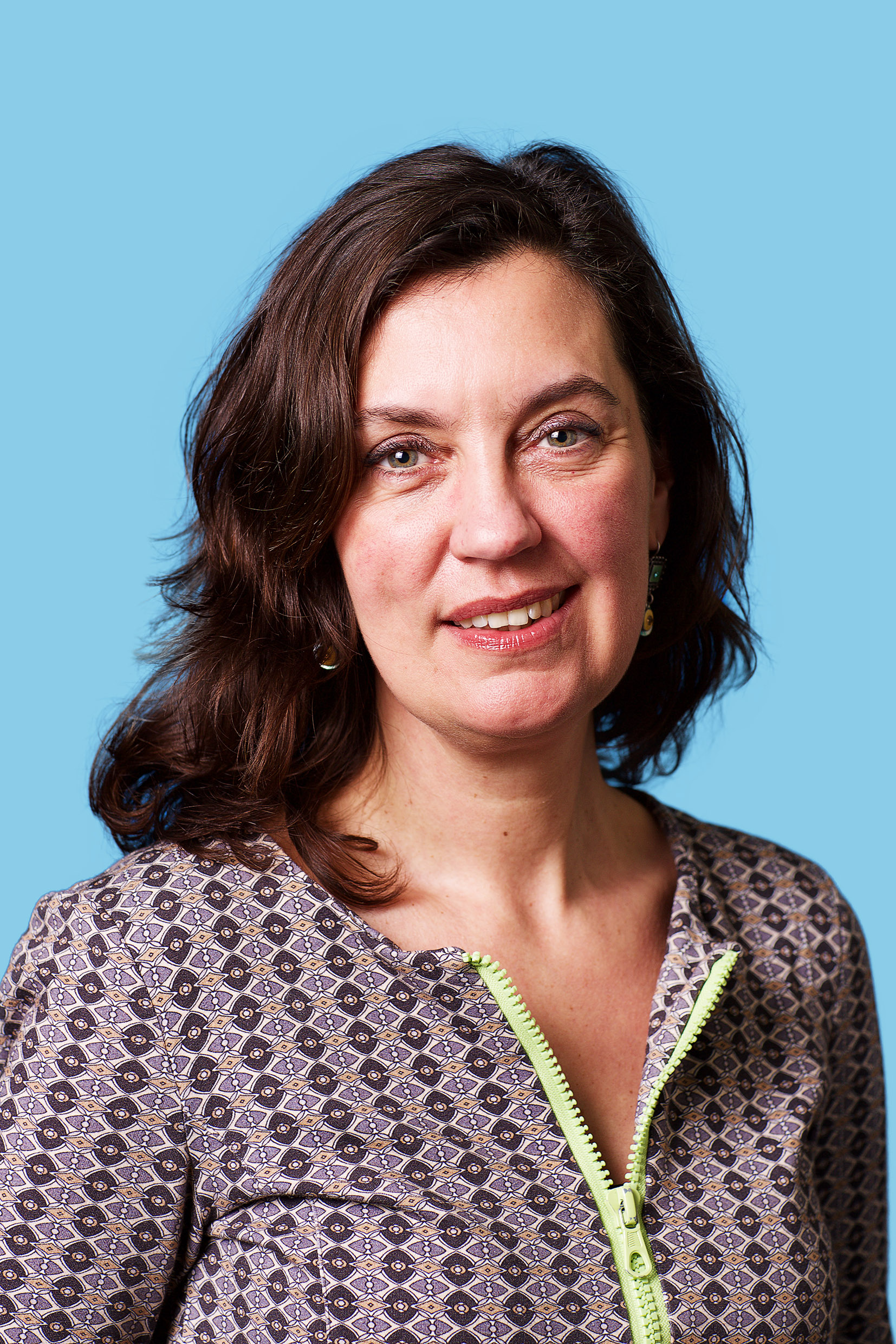
- Marith Volp in 2016

Member of the House of Representatives
- In office 3 September 2013 – 23 March 2017

Personal details
- Born: Marie-Janne Judith Volp; 2 November 1972 (age 53) Utrecht, Netherlands
- Party: Labour Party

Marie-Janne Judith "Marith" Volp (born 2 November 1972) is a Dutch politician and physician. On 3 September 2013, Volp was appointed as member of the Dutch House of Representatives, replacing Pierre Heijnen. Her term in the House ended on 23 March 2017.
