= Anoushka Schut-Welkzijn =

Dutch politician (born 1969)

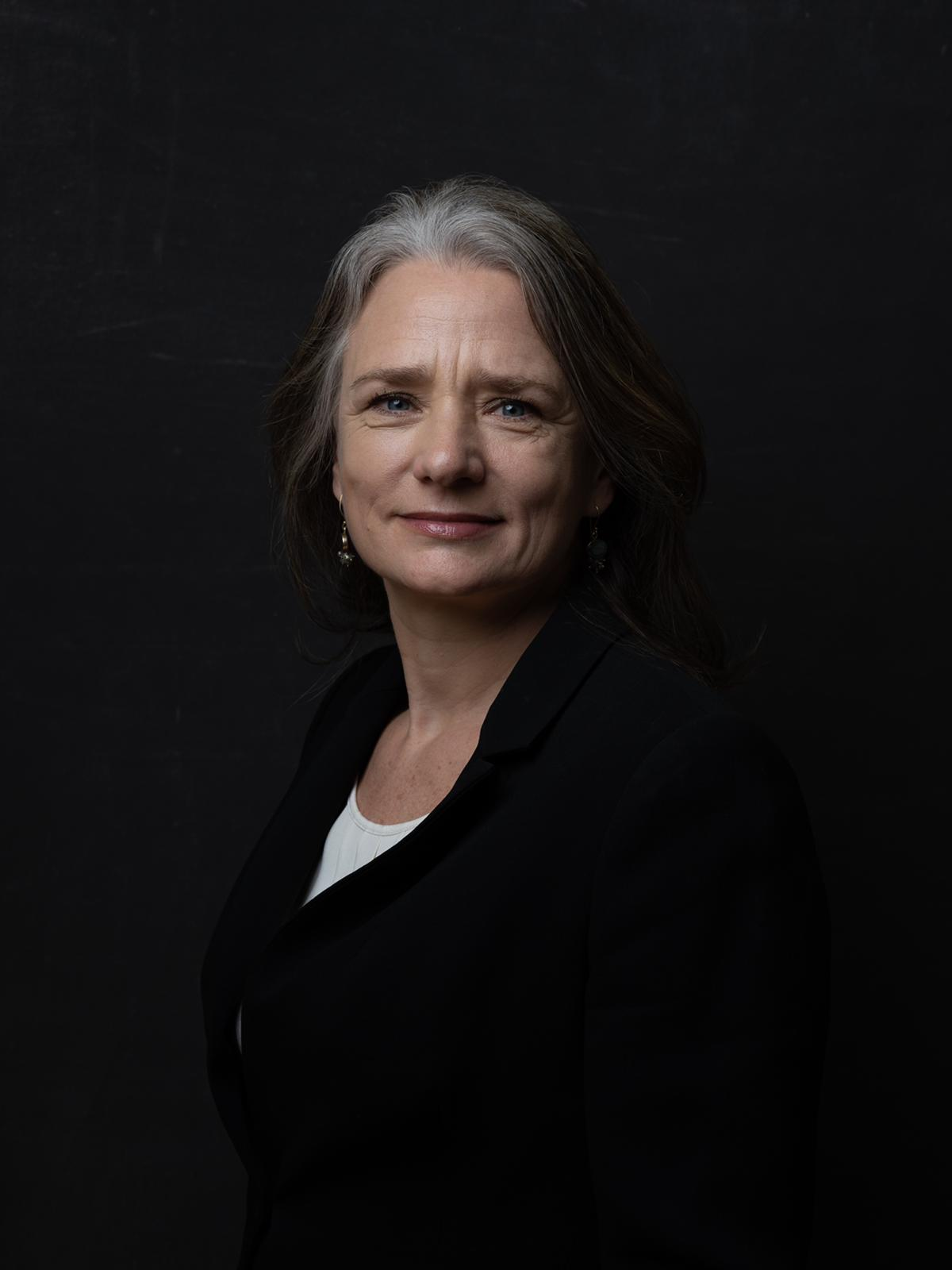
- Anoushka Schut-Welkzijn (2019)

Member of the House of Representatives
- In office 20 September 2012 – 23 March 2017

Personal details
- Born: 6 February 1969 (age 57) Delft
- Party: People's Party for Freedom and Democracy
- Occupation: Politician

Anoushka Schut-Welkzijn (born February 6, 1969, in Delft) is a Dutch politician. As a member of the People's Party for Freedom and Democracy (Volkspartij voor Vrijheid en Democratie) she was an MP between September 20, 2012, and March 23, 2017.

She worked for the Dutch Healthcare Authority (Nederlandse Zorgautoriteit) from 2005 to 2010, and was political assistant to Minister and fellow party member Edith Schippers from 2010 to 2012.

Schut-Welkzijn studied public administration at Erasmus University Rotterdam and economics at Birkbeck, University of London.
