= Michiel Servaes =

Dutch politician

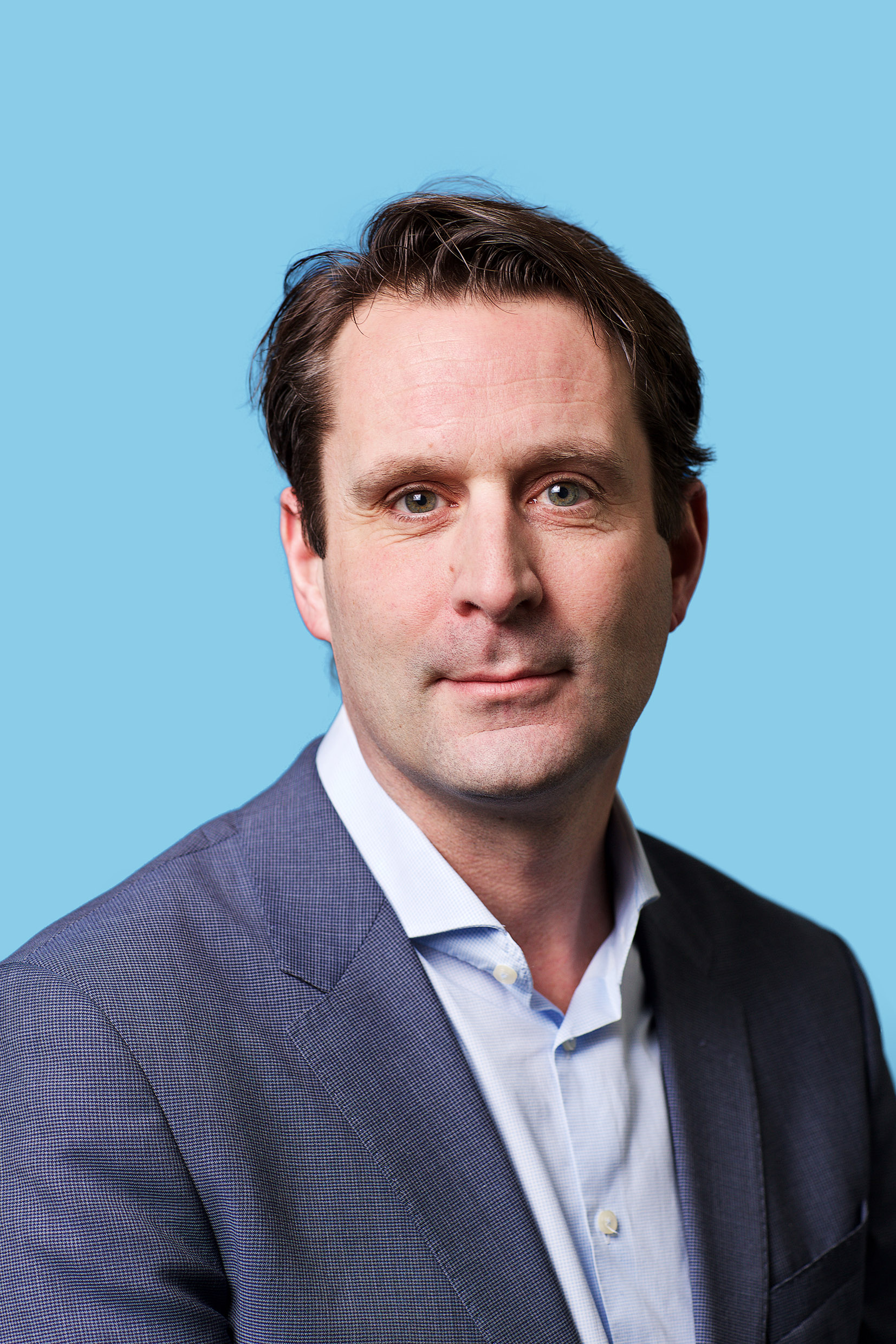
- Michiel Servaes in 2016

Member of the House of Representatives
- In office 20 September 2012 – 23 March 2017

Personal details
- Born: 21 February 1972 (age 54) Oss, Netherlands
- Party: Labour Party

Michiel Servaes (born 21 February 1972) is a Dutch politician. As a member of the Labour Party (Partij van de Arbeid) he was an MP between 20 September 2012 and 23 March 2017.

In 2015, news media reported that Servaes was included in a Russian blacklist of prominent people from the European Union who are not allowed to enter the country.
