= Ronald Vuijk =

Dutch politician (born 1965)

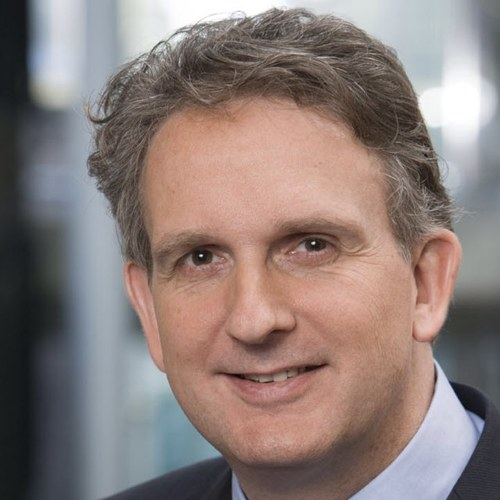
Ronald Vuijk

Ronald Vuijk (born 22 October 1965 in The Hague) is a Dutch politician. As a member of the People's Party for Freedom and Democracy (Volkspartij voor Vrijheid en Democratie) he was an MP between 8 November 2012 and 23 March 2017. Previously he was a municipal councillor of Delft from 2002 to 2005 and also from 2010 to 2011. In the meantime he was an alderman of this municipality. From 2011 to 2012, he was an alderman of the municipality of Midden-Delfland.
