= Duco Hoogland =

Dutch politician (born 1984)

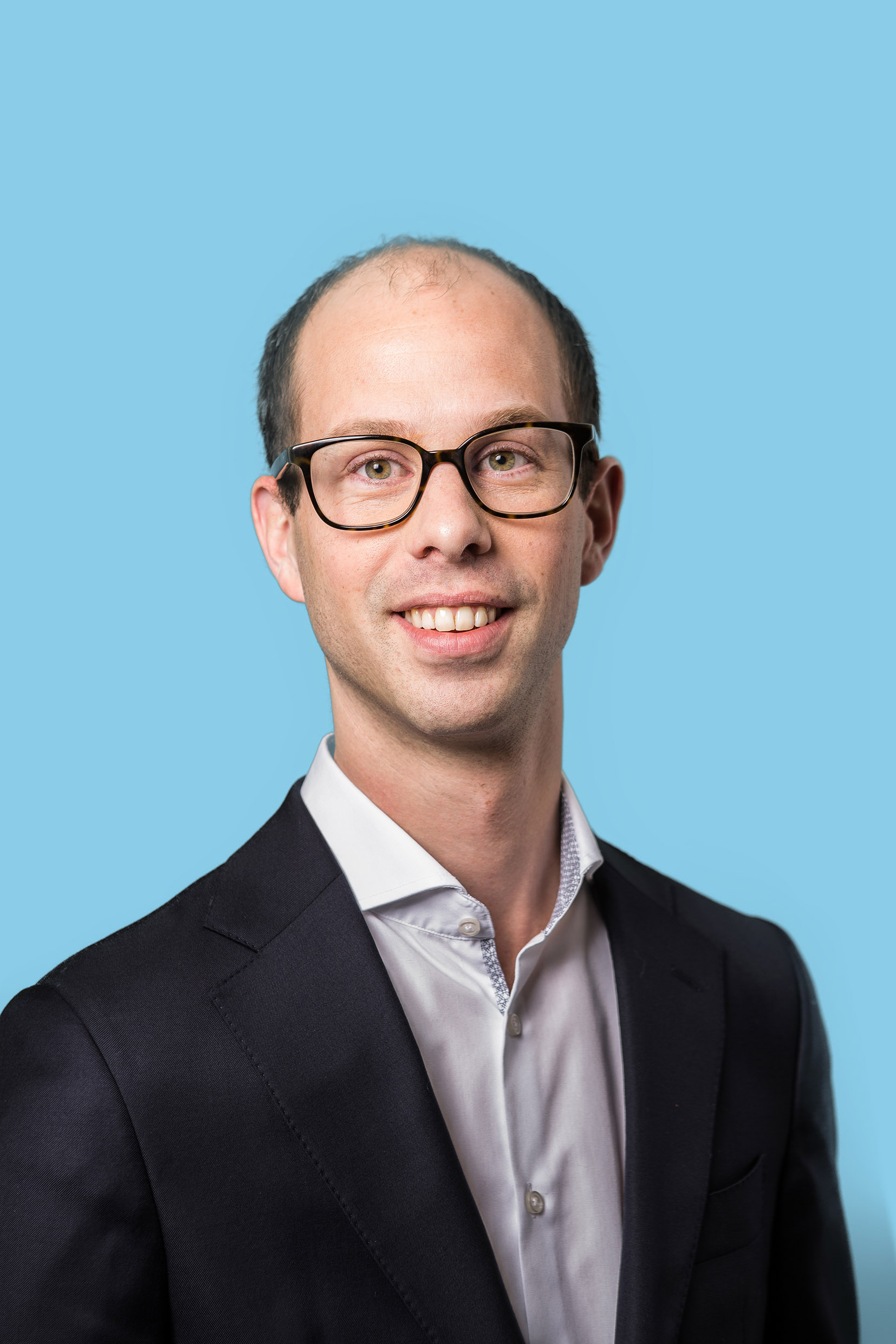
- Duco Hoogland in 2016

Member of the House of Representatives
- In office 20 September 2012 – 23 March 2017

Member of the municipal council of Rotterdam
- In office 16 March 2006 – 11 March 2010

Personal details
- Born: 14 September 1984 (age 41) Berkel en Rodenrijs, Netherlands
- Party: Labour Party

Duco Hoogland (born 14 September 1984) is a Dutch politician. As a member of the Labour Party (Partij van de Arbeid) he was an MP between 8 November 2012 and 23 March 2017. Previously he was a member of the municipal council of Rotterdam from 2006 to 2010.
