= Albert de Vries =

Dutch politician

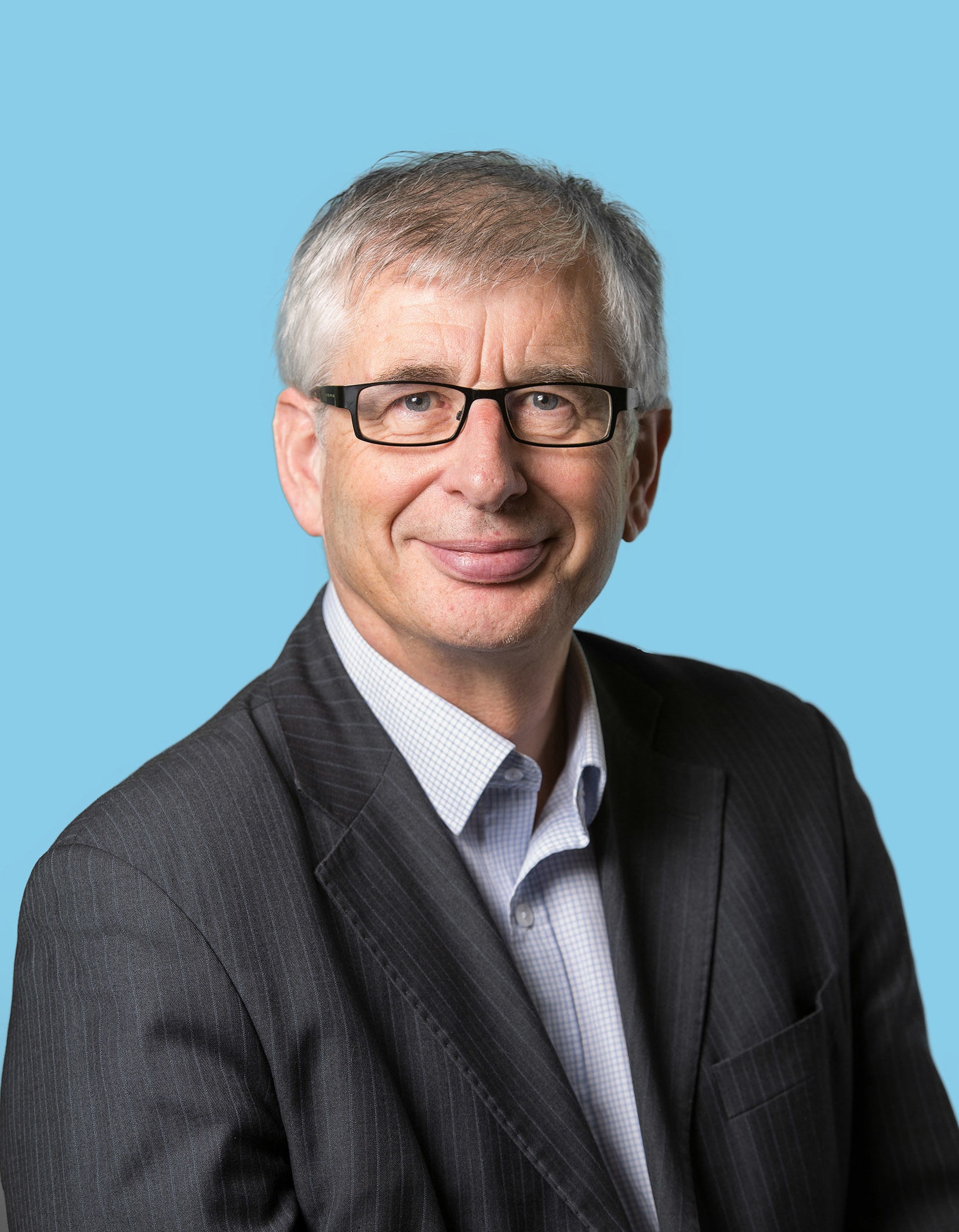
- Albert de Vries in 2016

Member of the House of Representatives
- In office 20 September 2012 – 23 March 2017

Alderman in Middelburg
- In office March 2002 – 1 October 2012

Personal details
- Born: Albertus Anthonie de Vries; 10 July 1955 (age 70) Middelburg, Netherlands
- Party: Labour Party

Albertus Anthonie (Albert) de Vries (born 10 July 1955) is a Dutch politician. As a member of the Labour Party (Partij van de Arbeid) he was a member of the House of Representatives between 20 September 2012 and 23 March 2017. Previously he was an alderman of the municipality of Middelburg from March 2002 to 1 October 2012.
