= Sjoera Dikkers =

Dutch politician and activist

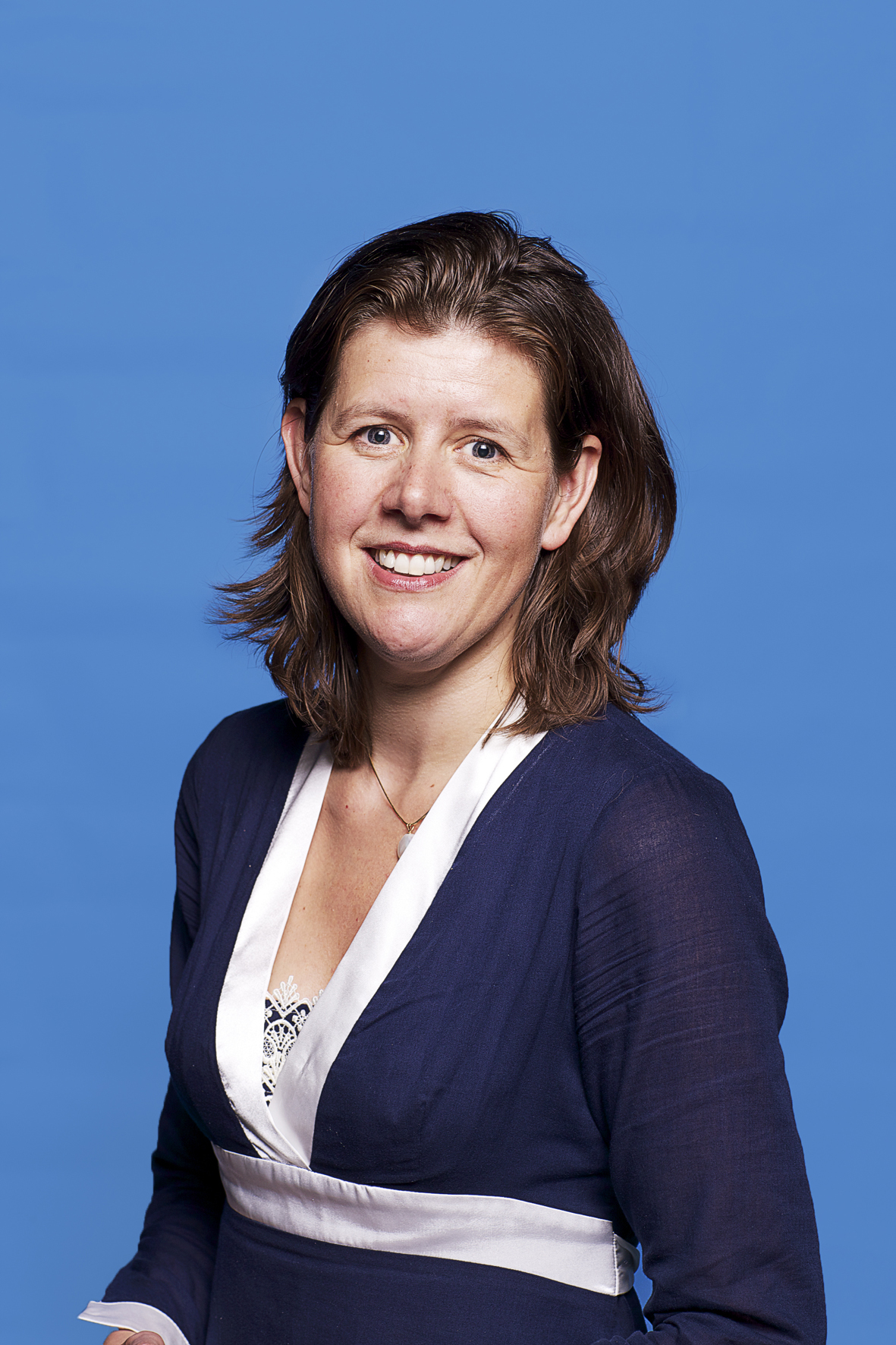
- Sjoera Dikkers

Member of the House of Representatives
- In office 17 June 2010 – 23 March 2017

Personal details
- Born: 14 July 1969 (age 56) Deventer
- Party: Labour Party
- Occupation: Politician

Sjoerdtje Willemien (Sjoera) Dikkers (born 14 July 1969 in Deventer) is a Dutch former politician and activist. As a member of the Labour Party (Partij van de Arbeid) she was an MP between 17 June 2010 and 23 March 2017. She focused on matters of development aid and commercial policy.

On 25 October 2016 Dikkers went on health leave and was temporarily replaced by Rien van der Velde, and from 14 December 2016 until 14 February 2017 by Emre Ünver.
