= Roald van der Linde =

Dutch politician (born 1968)

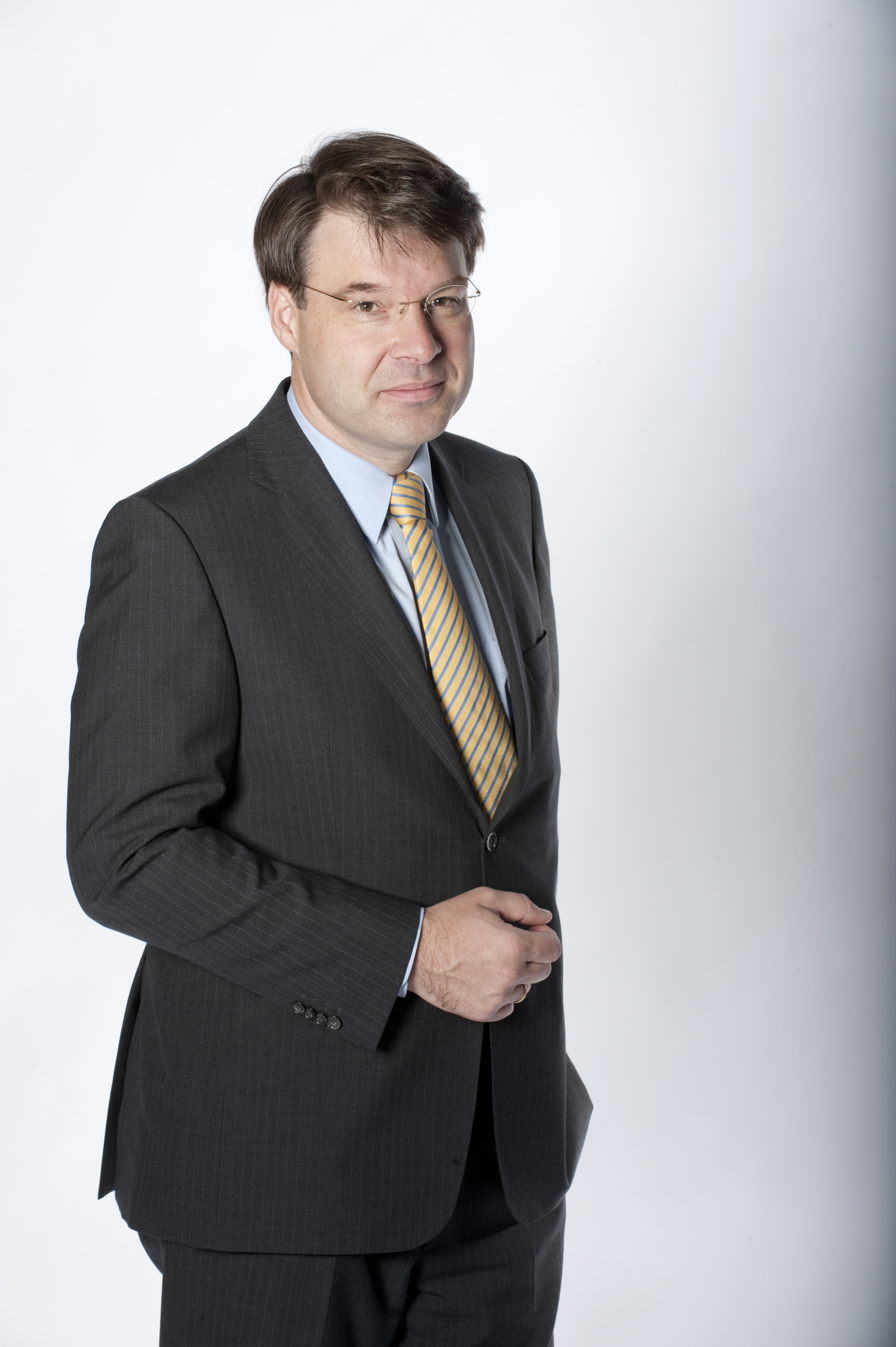
- Roald van der Linde

Member of the House of Representatives
- Incumbent
- Assumed office 7 September 2017
- In office 8 November 2012 – 23 March 2017

Personal details
- Born: 22 November 1968 (age 57) Rotterdam
- Party: People's Party for Freedom and Democracy
- Occupation: Politician

Roald Edwin van der Linde (born 22 November 1968 in Rotterdam) is a Dutch politician. As a member of the People's Party for Freedom and Democracy (Volkspartij voor Vrijheid en Democratie) he has been an MP since 7 September 2017. He previously served between 8 November 2012 and 23 March 2017. He returned to the House after the resignation of Pieter Duisenberg.
