= Daniël van der Ree =

Dutch politician (born 1972)

Member of the House of Representatives
- In office 7 September 2016 – 23 March 2017

Member of the municipal council of Amsterdam
- In office 11 March 2010 – 5 October 2016

Personal details
- Born: 8 January 1972 (age 54) Haarlem, Netherlands
- Party: People's Party for Freedom and Democracy

Daniël A. van der Ree (born 8 January 1972) is a Dutch politician. He was a member of the House of Representatives of the Netherlands for the People's Party for Freedom and Democracy between 7 September 2016 and 23 March 2017. He replaced Anne-Wil Lucas. He previously served in the municipal council of Amsterdam from 11 March 2010 until 5 October 2016. In the municipal council he dealt with land issues and was spokesperson for emphyteusis.

Van der Ree was born in Haarlem. He has had a career in real estate development since 2000. Van der Ree was number 56 on the People's Party for Freedom and Democracy list for the 2012 Dutch general election.
