= Remco Dijkstra =

Dutch politician (born 1972)

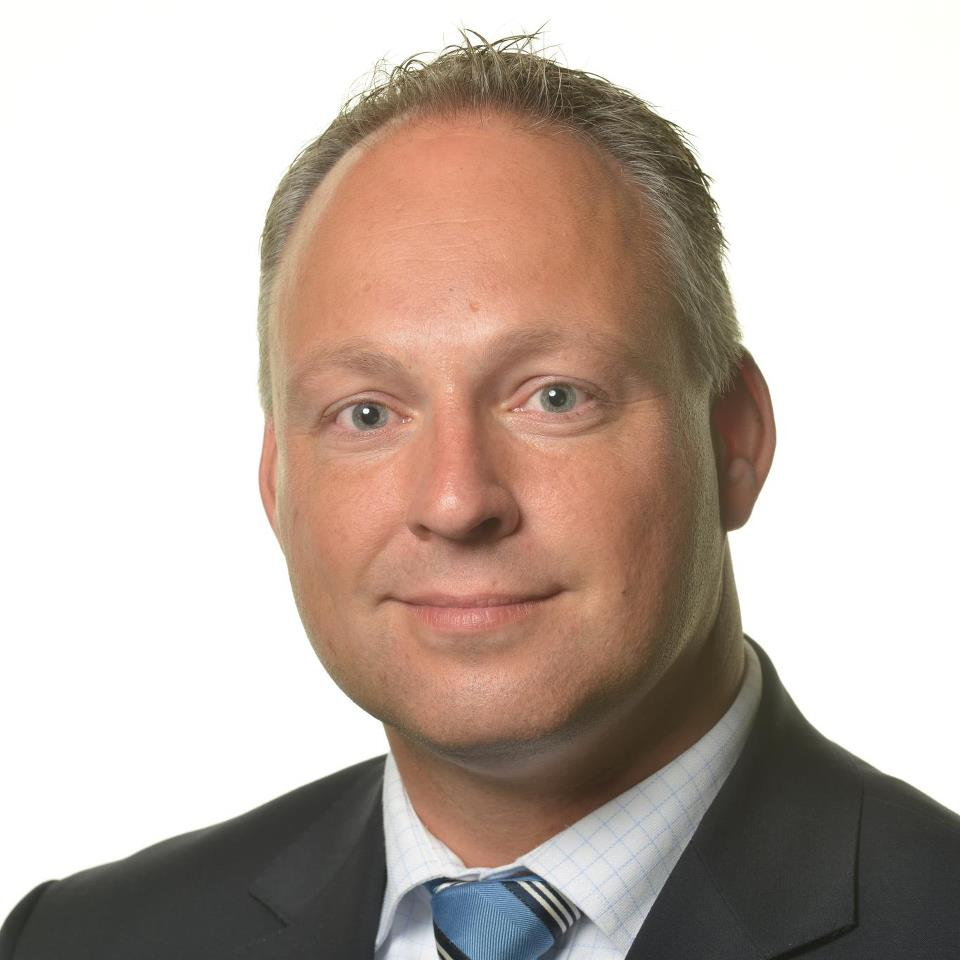
Remco Dijkstra

Remco Jan Dijkstra (born 18 August 1972, Zeist) is a Dutch politician. As a member of the People's Party for Freedom and Democracy (Volkspartij voor Vrijheid en Democratie) he has been an MP since 20 September 2012. Previously he was a member of the municipal council of Buren from 2006 to 2011, and subsequently a member of the provincial parliament of Gelderland from 2011 to 2012.
