= Grace Tanamal =

Dutch politician

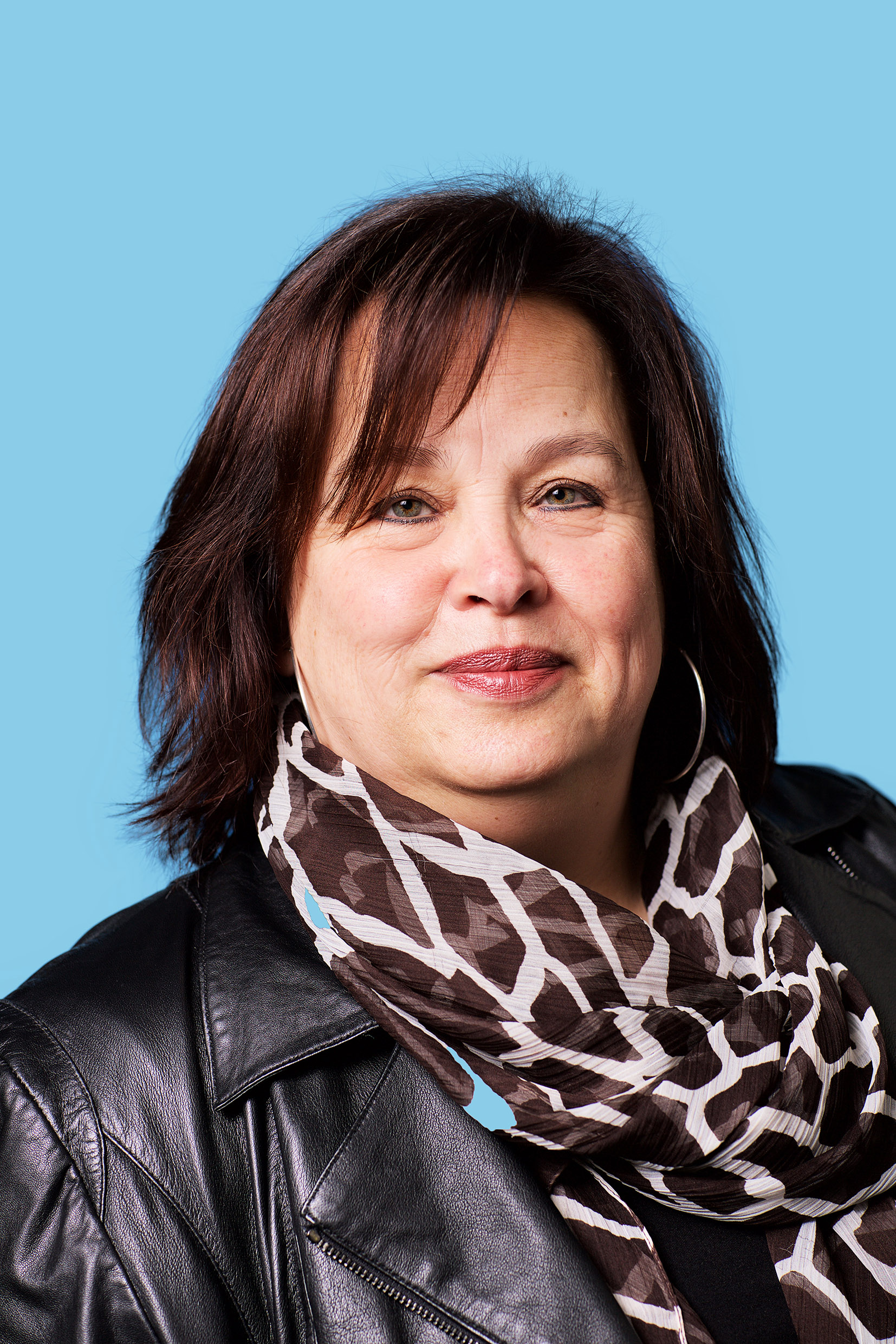
Grace Tanamal

Grace Sylvia Ingrid Annemarie Tanamal (born 10 January 1957 in The Hague) is a Dutch politician. As a member of the Labour Party (Partij van de Arbeid) she was an MP between 8 November 2012 and 23 March 2017. She was a member of the municipal council of Amersfoort between 2002 and 2012.
