= Arnold Merkies =

Dutch politician (born 1968)

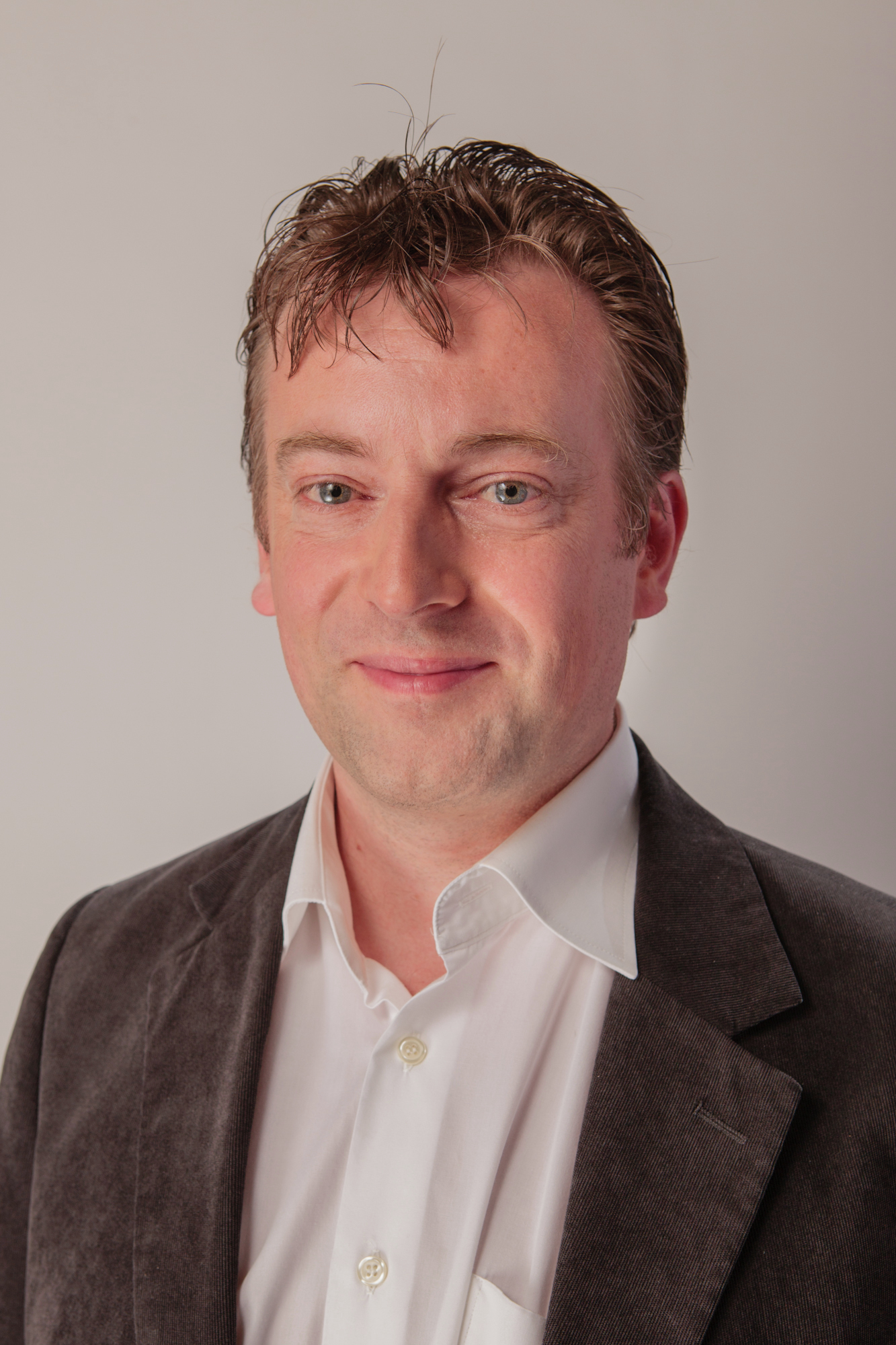
Arnold Merkies

Arnold Zoltan Merkies (born 6 December 1968) is a Dutch politician. As a member of the Socialist Party (Socialistische Partij) he was an MP between 20 September 2012 and 23 March 2017.

Merkies studied economics at the University of Amsterdam. He is married and lives in Amsterdam, and is a brother of PvdA politician Judith Merkies.
