= Désirée Bonis =

Dutch politician and diplomat

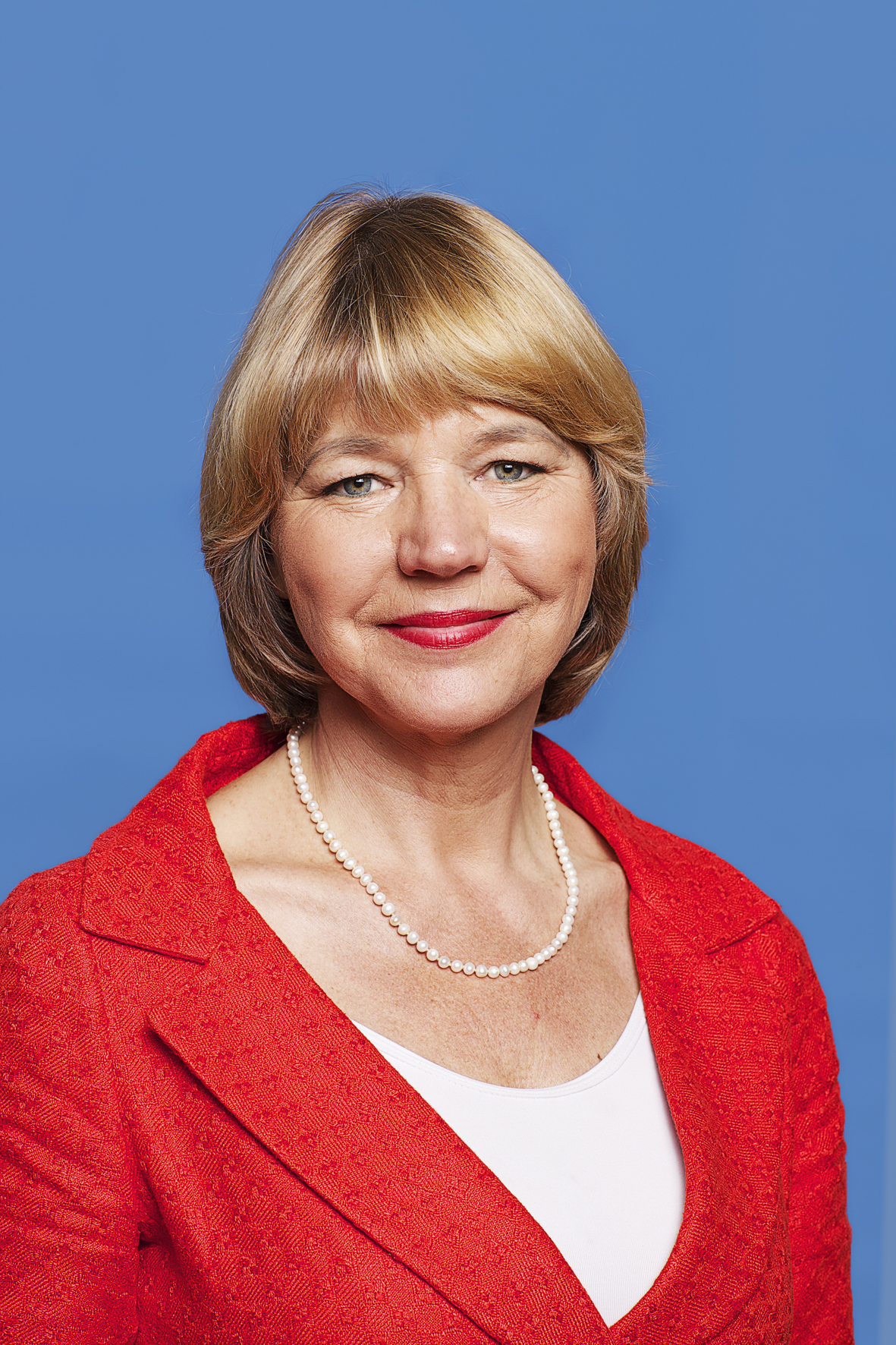
Désirée Bonis in 2011

Désirée Bonis (born 5 July 1959, in Velsen) is a former Dutch politician and diplomat. As a member of the Labour Party (Partij van de Arbeid) she was an MP from 20 September 2012 until 13 June 2013. She has been replaced by Yasemin Çegerek. Previously she worked as director of the department Sub-Saharan Africa at the Dutch Ministry of Foreign Affairs. She also performed several diplomatic duties; so she was ambassador to Syria from 2006 to 2010 (succeeded by Dolf Hogewoning).

Between 2013 and 2016 and she was the national coordinator for international positions at the Ministry of Foreign Affairs. Bonis was Dutch ambassador to Morocco from 2016 to 2020.

Bonis studied history. She is married, has two daughters.
