= Otwin van Dijk =

Dutch politician

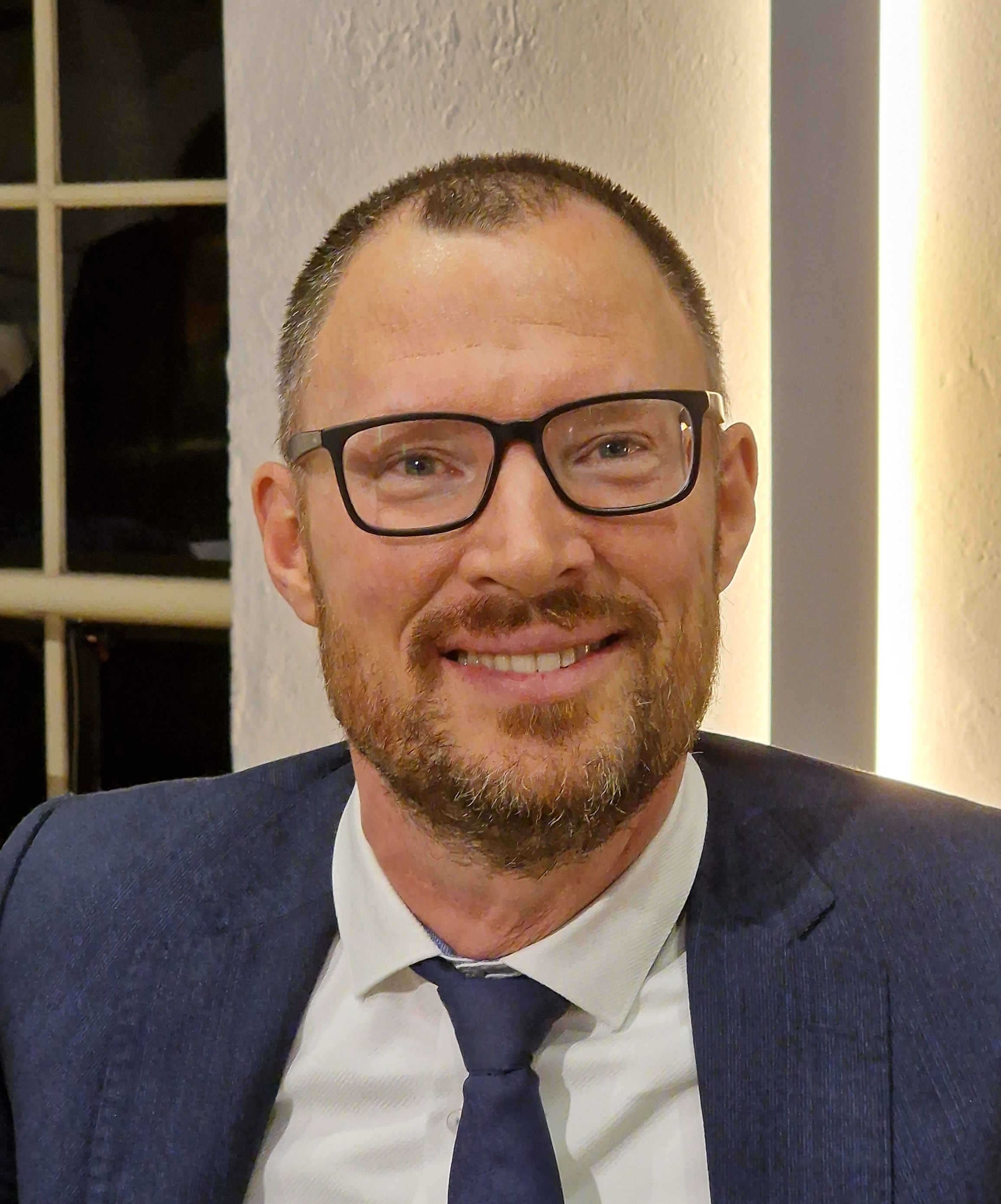
Otwin van Dijk

Otwin Evert Theodoor (Otwin) van Dijk (born 22 April 1975 in Rhenen) is a Dutch politician and former civil servant. A member of the Labour Party (Partij van de Arbeid), his political career started in the municipality council of Duiven. From 2005 to 2012 he served as alderman (a member of the local government) in Doetinchem. From 20 September 2012 to 6 July 2016 he was a member of the national parliament. Upon his resignation he was replaced by Harm Brouwer. On 8 July he was installed as mayor of the municipality of Oude IJsselstreek, a neighbouring municipality of Doetinchem. He stepped down as mayor on 1 March 2024 to become chairman of the executive board at Slingeland Hospital in Doetinchem.

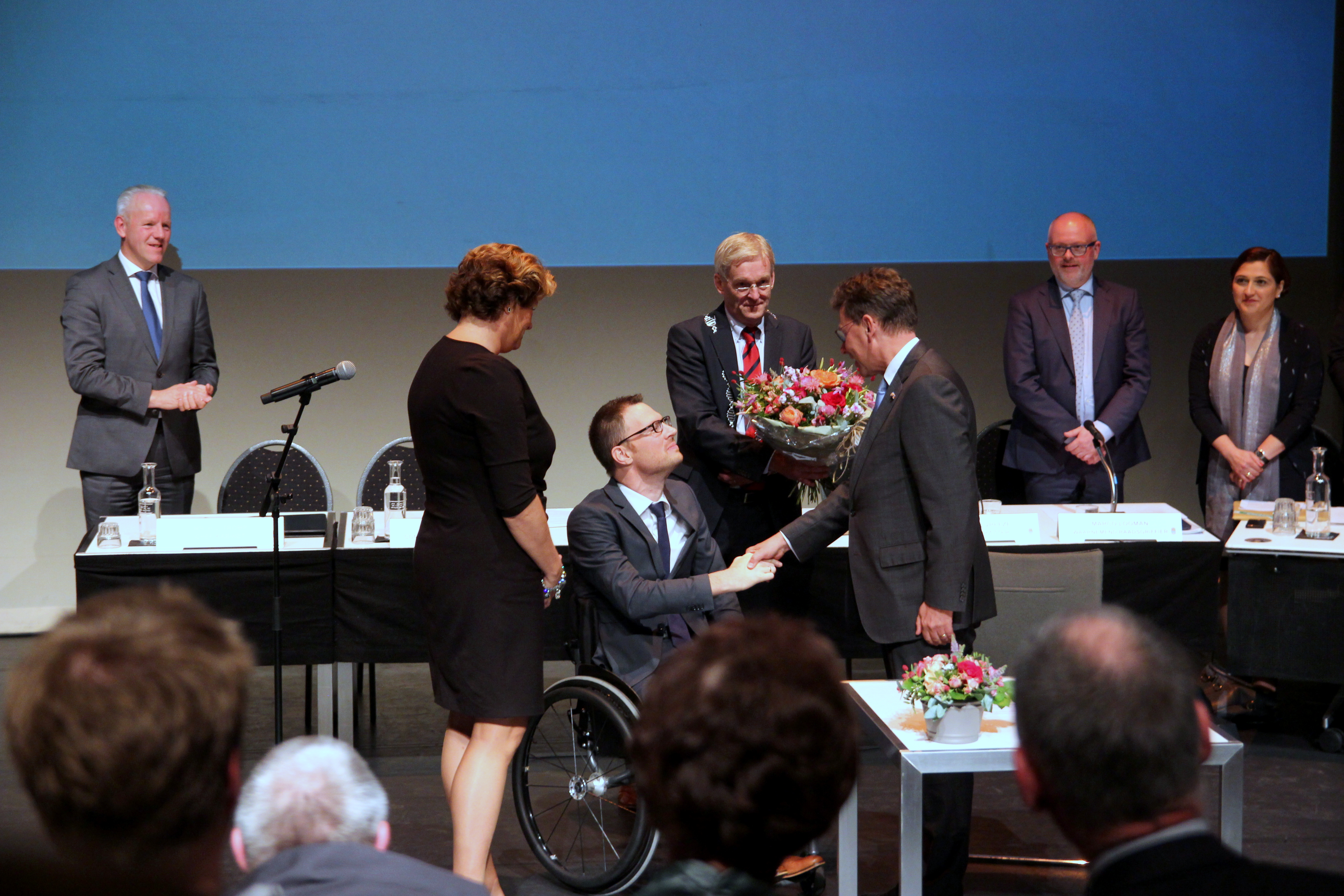
At the installation as mayor (burgemeester) of Oude IJsselstreek, July 2016 in the DRU Ulft

Van Dijk studied law at Radboud University Nijmegen and uses a wheelchair since an accident he had at the age of 18 years. He has made accessibility one of his political issues.
