= Jan Vos (politician) =

Dutch entrepreneur and politician (born 1972)

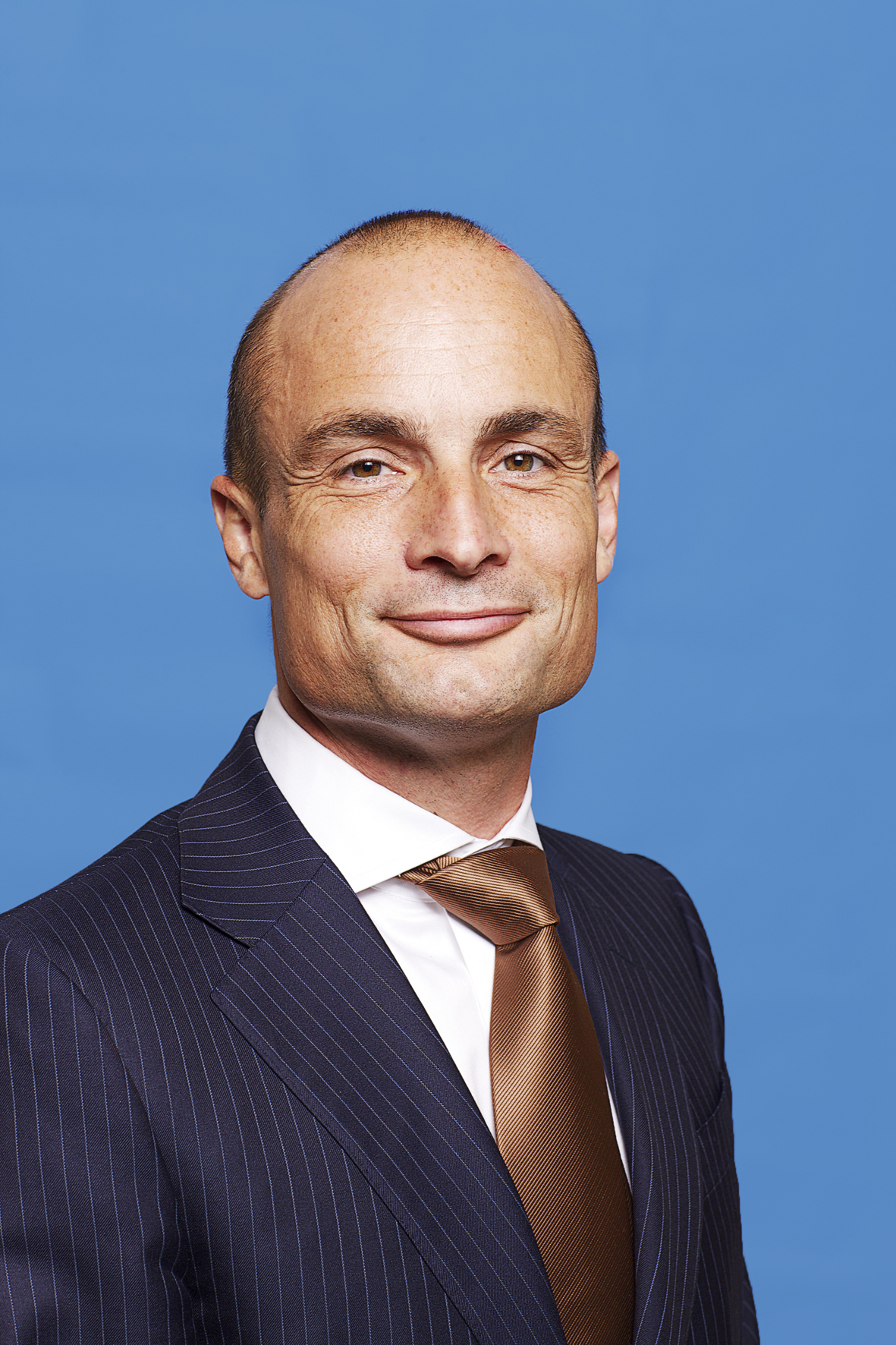
Jan Vos

Johannes Cornelis (Jan) Vos (born 9 February 1972 in Rotterdam) is a Dutch entrepreneur and politician. As a member of the Labour Party (Partij van de Arbeid) he was an MP between 20 September 2012 and 23 March 2017.
