= Emre Ünver =

Dutch politician

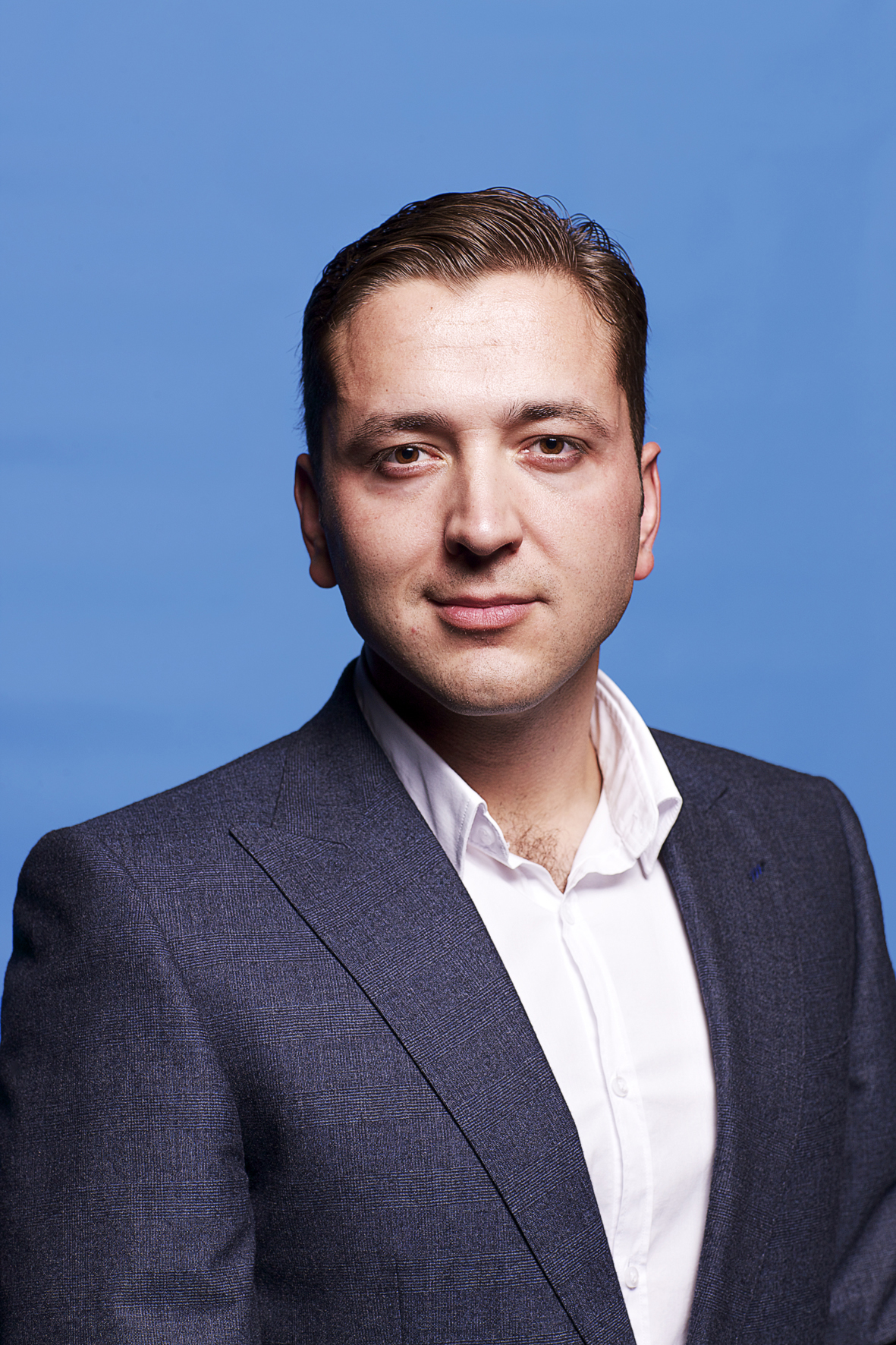
- Ünver in 2011

Member of the House of Representatives
- In office 14 December 2016 – 15 February 2017

Member of the municipal council of Amsterdam
- In office 11 March 2006 – 29 March 2018

Personal details
- Born: 19 November 1981 (age 43); Amsterdam, Netherlands
- Political party: Labour Party

Emre Ünver (born 19 November 1981) is a Dutch politician. He was a member of the House of Representatives for the Labour Party from 14 December 2016 until 15 February 2017, replacing Sjoera Dikkers. Ünver was a member of the municipal council of Amsterdam from 11 March 2006 until 2018 and served as party vice-councilchairman. Since May 2018 he has been President of the board of the borough of Amsterdam Nieuw-West.

In June 2016 Ünver spoke out against Turkey under Recep Tayyip Erdoğan, questioning how Labour Party members could defend his policies.
