= Judith Swinkels =

Dutch politician, lawyer and judge (born 1961)

Member of the House of Representatives of the Netherlands
- In office 3 November 2015 – 23 March 2017

Personal details
- Born: 4 June 1961 (age 65) Tilburg, Netherlands
- Party: Democrats 66
- Education: Leiden University

Judith C.M. Swinkels (born 4 June 1961) is a Dutch politician. She was a member of the House of Representatives of the Netherlands for Democrats 66 from 3 November 2015 to 23 March 2017. Previously, she was a lawyer and a judge.

== Career ==
Swinkels was born on 4 June 1961 in Tilburg. She went to the gymnasium in the same city between 1973 and 1979. She subsequently studied civil and European law at Leiden University and graduated in 1984. Swinkels was occupied as a lawyer between 1985 and 1999. Between 1999 and 2002, she worked for the Netherlands Competition Authority. In 2002, Swinkels was appointed as a judge in Haarlem. For the first five years, she was a judge of civil and trade law. In 2007, this became civil and family and youth law. In 2011, she switched to civil and criminal law.

In the Parliamentary elections of 2012, Swinkels occupied number 14 on the Democrats 66 party list and was not elected as the party gained 12 seats.

On 3 November 2015, Swinkels joined the House of Representatives of the Netherlands as a replacement for Magda Berndsen. She took up the security and justice portfolio, which Berndsen previously held. Swinkels had resigned as a judge on 1 November. Her term in the House ended on 23 March 2017.
