= Sultan Günal-Gezer =

Dutch politician (born 1961)

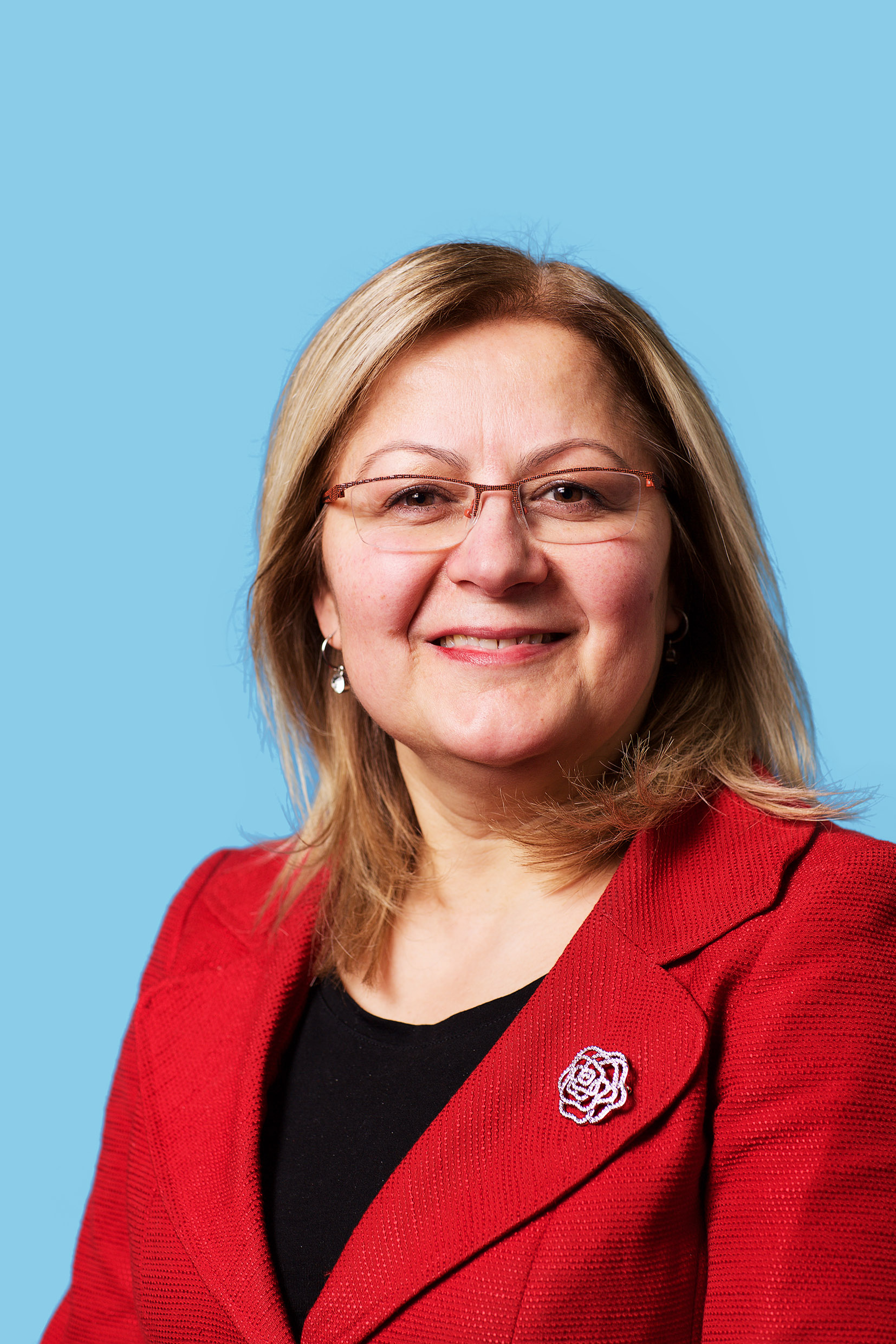
- Sultan Günal-Gezer in 2016

Member of the House of Representatives
- In office 8 November 2012 – 23 March 2017

Alderman of Uden
- In office 20 April 2006 – 9 November 2012

Member of the municipal council of Uden
- In office 14 March 2002 – 10 April 2006

Personal details
- Born: 1 May 1961 (age 65) Antakya, Turkey
- Party: Labour Party

Sultan Günal-Gezer (born 1 May 1961) is a Dutch politician of Turkish descent. As a member of the Labour Party (Partij van de Arbeid) she was a member of the House of Representatives between 8 November 2012 and 23 March 2017. Previously she was an alderman of Uden from 2006 to 2012 and a member of the municipal council of the same municipality from 2002 to 2006.
