= Johan Houwers =

Dutch politician and real estate broker

Johan Houwers (born 4 October 1957 in Winterswijk, Netherlands) is a Dutch politician and real estate broker. As a member of the People's Party for Freedom and Democracy (Volkspartij voor Vrijheid en Democratie) he was an MP from 26 October 2010 to 20 September 2012. He focused on matters of greenhouses, fishery, hunting, animal welfare, spatial planning and water. From 8 November 2012, he once again was an MP, resigning on 22 July 2013, following to a mortgage fraud investigation. He served as an independent MP between 25 March 2015 and 23 March 2017.

Houwers was a member of the municipal council of Winterswijk from 1990 to 2002, and again between 11 March 2010 and 5 July 2012. From 1990 to 1994, and again since 2010, he was VVD fraction leader. From 1994 to 2001, he was also an alderman and from 1999 to 2010, a member of the States of Gelderland.

Houwers studied social geography (BA) as well as urban planning (MA) at Radboud University Nijmegen.

After the possible return of the wolf to the Netherlands, Houwers mentioned that if the population numbers rose, wolves should be shot so they would not present a harm to society. Houwers clashed with the coalition Labour Party politician Lutz Jacobi on the topic.

== Mortgage fraud investigation ==
On 22 July 2013, Houwers resigned his seat after it was revealed that the police started an investigation into him concerning possible mortgage fraud. Aegon and Rabobank, the mortgage providers, filed charges against him because he did not represent his income correctly. On 31 July, justice authorities seized Houwers' property in Winterswijk for 1 million euro. Houwers said he would wait for the outcome of the investigation before responding to the press. On 16 March 2015, he was found guilty of forgery and fraud and had to pay a fine of €4000. According to the fraction leader of the VVD in Parliament, Halbe Zijlstra, he could not return as an MP for the VVD.
