= Matthijs Huizing =

Dutch politician (born 1960)

Matthijs Egbert Huizing

Member of the House of Representatives
- In office 26 October 2010 – 6 December 2013

Personal details
- Born: Matthijs Egbert Huizing; 10 October 1960 (age 65) Leiden
- Party: Party for Freedom
- Occupation: Politician

Matthijs Huizing (born 10 October 1960 in Leiden) is a Dutch politician and former (sports) manager. As a member of the People's Party for Freedom and Democracy (Volkspartij voor Vrijheid en Democratie) he was an MP since 26 October 2010, until 6 December 2013. He left after he had been recently arrested for driving under the influence. He focused on matters of supervisors, accountancy, social security, aviation, ship transport, inland navigation and harbors.

From 1980 to 1984, he was a member and also VVD fraction leader of the municipal council of the ward Kralingen-Crooswijk and from 2002 to 2008, and also till 2007 VVD fraction leader of the municipal council of Oegstgeest.

Huizing studied economics (BA) as well as administration of business (MA) at Erasmus University Rotterdam.
