= Pierre Heijnen =

Dutch politician and civil servant

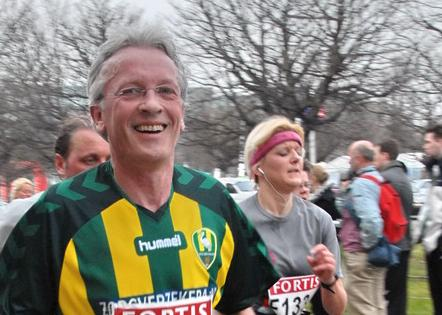
- Pierre Heijnen

Member of the House of Representatives
- In office 1 March 2007 – 1 September 2013

Personal details
- Born: 5 October 1953 (age 72) The Hague
- Party: Labour Party
- Occupation: Politician

Pierre Maria Michel Heijnen (born 5 October 1953 in The Hague) is a Dutch politician and former civil servant. As a member of the Labour Party (Partij van de Arbeid) he was an MP between 1 March 2007 and 1 September 2013. He focused on matters of local government, civil service personnel and finances.

Heijnen studied Dutch language and Dutch literature at Utrecht University. He worked at the province of South Holland from 1977 to 1998. From 1986 to 2002 he was a member of the municipal council of The Hague and from April 1998 to April 2006 an alderman of the same municipality.
