= Hayke Veldman =

Dutch politician (born 1969)

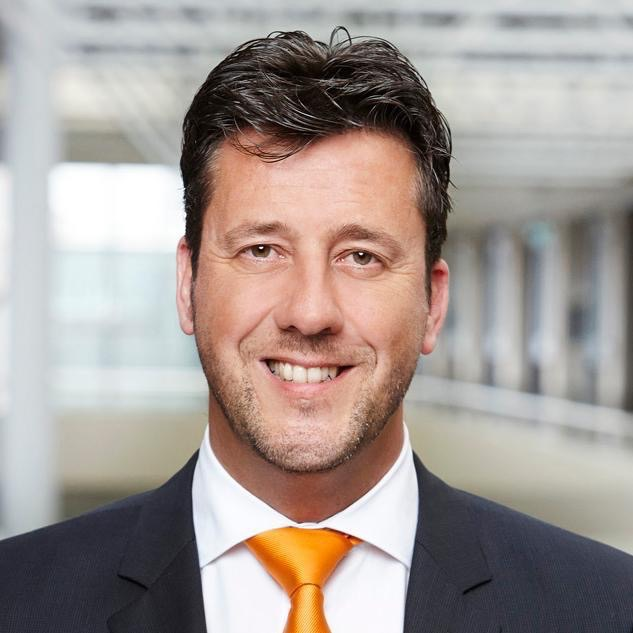
- Hayke Veldman

Member of the House of Representatives of the Netherlands
- Incumbent
- Assumed office 25 June 2014
- In office 25 June 2014 – 30 March 2021

Personal details
- Born: 5 November 1969 (age 56) Zoetermeer, Netherlands
- Party: People's Party for Freedom and Democracy

Habbo Siebold "Hayke" Veldman (born 5 November 1969) is a Dutch politician, he was a member of the House of Representatives of the Netherlands for the People's Party for Freedom and Democracy from 25 June 2014 until 30 March 2021.

== Life ==
Veldman was born on 5 November 1969 in Zoetermeer. After attending high school in Rosmalen, he studied history at the Radboud University Nijmegen between 1989 and 1995. Veldman worked as a policy worker for the municipalities of Geldermalsen, Eindhoven, Arnhem and Helmond between 1996 and 2010. He has had its own consultancy since 2010. He was member of the municipal council of Nijmegen from 16 March 2006 until 9 July 2014. On 25 June 2014, he entered the House of Representatives when he replaced Pieter Litjens, who became alderman in Amsterdam. His term in office ended 23 March 2017. He re-entered the House on 31 October 2017. During the COVID-19 pandemic in the Netherlands he was party spokesperson for the issue. After his departure from the Chamber, Veldman started his consultancy firm again. On 8 March 2021, he was appointed chairman of the Tilburg Court of Audit by the Tilburg city council. As of 1 February 2022, Veldman is a member of the Advisory Board on Regulatory Burden. On 21 May 2022, Veldman was elected the new president of the Royal Dutch Swimming Federation. Veldman has been an envoy for the Green Deal Sustainable Care since 1 June 2023.
