= List of Democrats 66 members of the European Parliament =

This is a list of all (former) Member of the European Parliament for the Democrats 66 (D66).

== Seats in the European Parliament ==
Election year	List	# of overall votes	% of overall vote	# of overall seats won	+/–	Notes
1979	List	511,967	9.03 (#4)	2 / 25		
1984	List	120,826	2.28 (#7)	0 / 25	2 ▼	
1989	List	311,990	5.95 (#5)	1 / 25	1 ▲	
1994	List	481,826	11.66 (#4)	4 / 31	3 ▲	
1999	List	205,623	5.80 (#6)	2 / 31	2 ▼	
2004	List	202,502	4.25 (#8)	1 / 27	1 ▼	
2009	List	515,422	11.32 (#5)	3 / 25	2 ▲	
2014	List	735,825	15.48 (#1)	4 / 26	1 ▲	
2019	List	389,692	7.09 (#6)	2 / 26	2 ▼	
2024	List	523,650	8.40 (#5)	3 / 31	1 ▲	

== Alphabetical ==
=== Delegation members of the European Parliament (1958-79) ===
Delegation member	Sex	Period	Photo
Doeke Eisma	Male	from 13-05-1973 till 02-10-1974	
Maarten Engwirda	Male	from 22-09-1971 till 12-03-1973	

=== Elected members of the European Parliament (from 1979) ===
Current members of the European Parliament are in bold.

European Parliament member	Sex	Period	Photo
**Brigitte van den Berg**	Female	from 16-07-2024 till present	
Jan-Willem Bertens	Male	from 24-07-1989 till 19-07-1999	
Johanna Boogerd-Quaak	Female	from 19-07-1994 till 19-07-1999 from 05-02-2003 till 19-07-2004	
Bob van den Bos	Male	from 20-07-1999 till 19-07-2004	
Laurens Jan Brinkhorst	Male	from 19-07-1994 till 07-07-1999	
Suzanne Dekker	Female	from 17-07-1979 till 09-06-1981	
Doeke Eisma	Male	from 19-06-1981 till 23-07-1984 from 19-07-1994 till 19-07-1999	
**Raquel García Hermida-van der Walle**	Female	from 16-07-2024 till present	
**Gerben-Jan Gerbrandy**	Male	from 14-07-2009 till 01-07-2019 from 16-07-2024 till present	
Aar de Goede	Male	from 17-07-1979 till 23-07-1984	
Lousewies van der Laan	Female	from 20-07-1999 till 29-01-2003	
Matthijs van Miltenburg	Male	from 01-07-2014 till 01-07-2019	
Samira Rafaela	Female	from 02-07-2019 till 15-07-2024	
Marietje Schaake	Female	from 14-07-2009 till 01-07-2019	
Sophie in 't Veld	Female	from 20-07-2004 till 15-07-2024	
