= Eddy Schuyer =

Dutch politician (born 1940)

His Excellency Eddy Schuyer
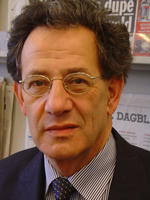
- Eddy Schuyer in 2005

Parliamentary leader of the Democrats 66 in the Senate of the Netherlands
- In office 1 March 1995 – 12 June 2007
- Preceded by: Jan Vis
- Succeeded by: Gerard Schouw

Member of the Senate of the Netherlands
- In office 11 June 1991 – 12 June 2007

Personal details
- Born: Eduard Henri Schuyer; 28 July 1940 (age 85) The Hague, Netherlands
- Party: Democrats 66 (from 1967)
- Occupation: Politician; Teacher; Nonprofit director Historian; Author

Eduard Henri "Eddy" Schuyer (born 28 July 1940) is a retired Dutch politician of the Democrats 66 (D66) party.

Party political offices
Preceded by Jan Vis	Parliamentary leader of the Democrats 66 in the Senate of the Netherlands; 1995–2007	Succeeded by Gerard Schouw
