= Jan Glastra van Loon =

Dutch politician (1920–2001)

His Excellency Jan Glastra van Loon
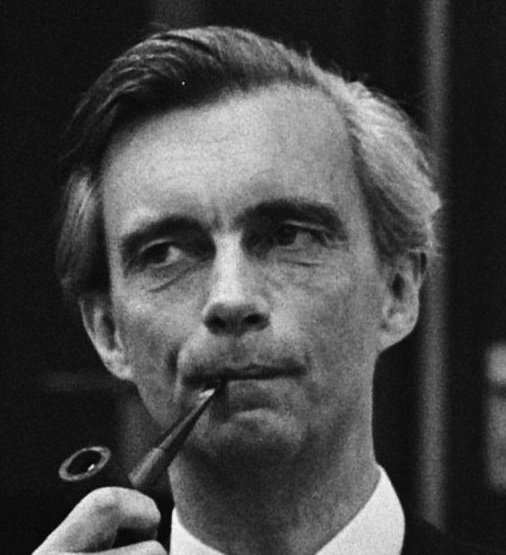
- Jan Glastra van Loon in 1975

Parliamentary leader in the Senate
- In office 16 September 1980 – 3 December 1985
- Preceded by: Doeke Eisma (1977)
- Succeeded by: Jan Vis
- Parliamentary group: Democrats 66

Member of the Senate
- In office 16 September 1980 – 8 June 1999
- Parliamentary group: Democrats 66

Chairman of the Democrats 66
- In office 6 November 1976 – 27 October 1979
- Leader: Jan Terlouw
- Preceded by: Jan ten Brink
- Succeeded by: Henk Zeevalking

State Secretary for Justice
- In office 13 June 1973 – 27 May 1975
- Prime Minister: Joop den Uyl
- Preceded by: Hans Grosheide
- Succeeded by: Henk Zeevalking

Personal details
- Born: Jan Frederik Glastra van Loon; 16 March 1920 Batavia, Dutch East Indies
- Died: 22 October 2001 (aged 81) The Hague, Netherlands
- Party: Democrats 66
- Spouse: Els Boon (m. 1947; div. 1972)
- Children: 4 children
- Education: Leiden University (Bachelor of Laws, Master of Laws, Doctor of Philosophy)
- Occupation: Politician · Jurist · Lawyer · Judge · Researcher · Nonprofit director · Academic administrator · professor · Author

Jan Frederik Glastra van Loon (16 March 1920 – 22 October 2001) was a Dutch politician of the Democrats 66 (D66) party.

Van Loon served in various roles throughout the 1970s and 80s. His most prominent roles were as the Parliamentary leader in the Senate from 1980 to 1985, as the Chairman of the Democrats 66 from 1976 to 1979, as State Secretary for Justice from 1973 to 1975, and as a Member of the Senate from 1980 to 1999.

He graduated from Leiden University, and was part of the Dutch resistance against the Nazis as part of the Council of Nine which was the student resistance.

Since 2004, D66 has awarded a medal in his honor to people who have made "a special and long-term commitment to the party at national and/or European level".

== Decorations ==
Honours
Ribbon bar	Honour	Country	Date	Comment
	Knight of the Order of the Netherlands Lion	Netherlands	1 October 1975	
	Commander of the Order of Orange-Nassau	Netherlands	28 April 1995	

Party political offices
Preceded by Jan ten Brink	Chairman of the Democrats 66; 1976–1979	Succeeded by Henk Zeevalking
Preceded by Doeke Eisma; 1977	Parliamentary leader of the Democrats 66 in the Senate; 1980–1985	Succeeded by Jan Vis
Political offices
Preceded by Hans Grosheide	State Secretary for Justice; 1973–1975	Succeeded by Henk Zeevalking
Non-profit organization positions
Preceded by Rob Tielman	Chairman of Humanistisch Verbond; 1987–1994	Succeeded by Paul Cliteur
