= Fatma Koşer Kaya =

Dutch politician

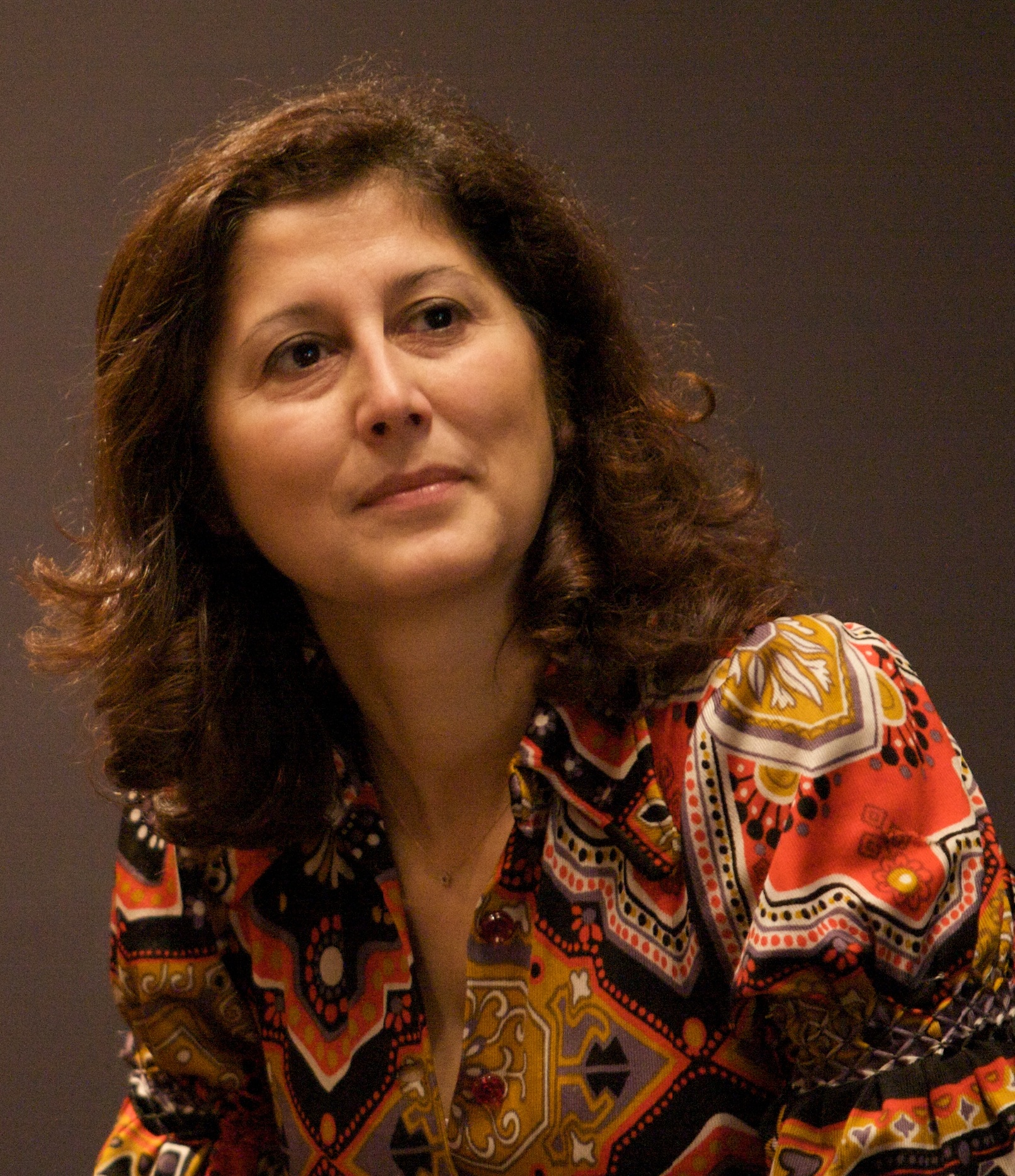

Member of the House of Representatives of the Netherlands
- In office 8 September 2004 – 19 September 2012; 19 August 2015 – 23 March 2017

Personal details
- Born: Fatma Koşer Kaya; 20 February 1968 (age 58) Çarşamba, Turkey
- Party: Democrats 66 (Democraten 66 - D66)
- Education: Tilburg University (LLM in International law)
- Occupation: Politician, lawyer

Fatma Koşer Kaya (born 20 February 1968 in Çarşamba, Turkey) is a Dutch lawyer and politician of Turkish origin. As a member of Democrats 66 (D66) she was an MP from 8 September 2004 to 19 September 2012. She focused on social affairs. From February 2013 to June 2014, she was an alderwoman of Wassenaar. On 19 August 2015 she once again became a member of the House of Representatives, replacing Gerard Schouw. Her term in the House ended on 23 March 2017. From 20 June 2018 to 5 July 2022, she was an alderwoman of Amersfoort.

On 13 October 2022, Koşer Kaya was appointed as the chairperson of the National Clients' Council. She commenced her duties on 1 November 2022.

Koşer Kaya grew up in Bergen op Zoom and studied international law at Tilburg University.

== Electoral history ==
Electoral history of Vera Bergkamp
Year	Body	Party	Pos.	Votes	Result		Ref.
Year	Body	Party	Pos.	Votes	Party seats	Individual	Ref.
2021	House of Representatives	Democrats 66	75	536	24	Lost	
