= Henk Zeevalking =

Dutch politician

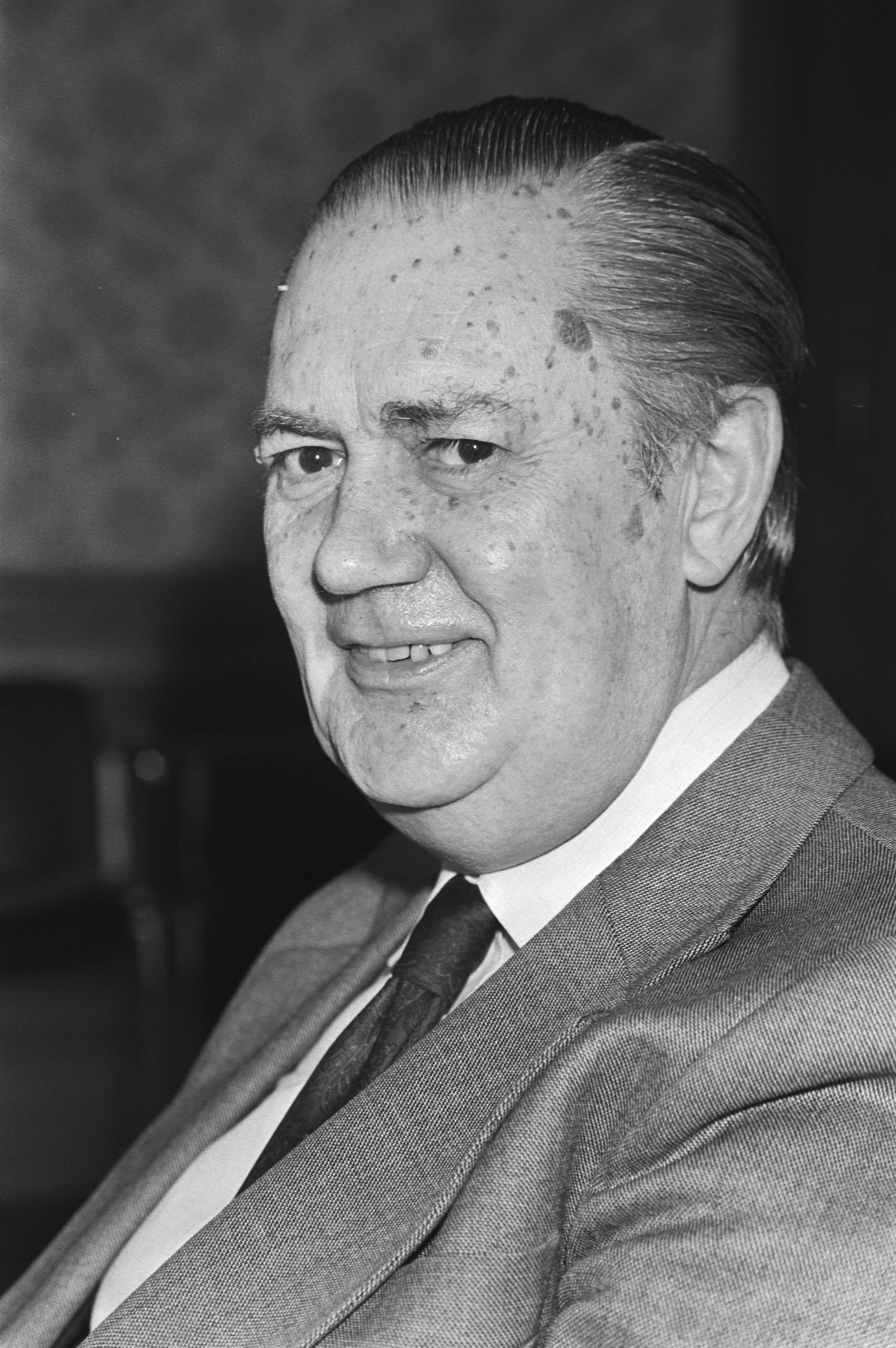
- Henk Zeevalking in 1981

Minister of Transport and Water Management
- In office 11 September 1981 – 4 November 1982
- Prime Minister: Dries van Agt
- Preceded by: Dany Tuijnman
- Succeeded by: Neelie Kroes

Chairman of the Democrats 66
- In office 27 October 1979 – 11 September 1981
- Leader: Jan Terlouw
- Preceded by: Jan Glastra van Loon
- Succeeded by: Cees Spigt (Ad interim)

Mayor of Rijswijk
- In office 16 January 1979 – 11 September 1981
- Preceded by: Hans Grosheide
- Succeeded by: Riet Daamen-van Houte

Member of the House of Representatives
- In office 8 June 1977 – 24 January 1979
- Parliamentary group: Democrats 66

State Secretary for Justice
- In office 6 June 1975 – 8 September 1977
- Prime Minister: Joop den Uyl
- Preceded by: Jan Glastra van Loon
- Succeeded by: Bert Haars

Mayor of Utrecht
- In office 1 February 1974 – 6 September 1974; Ad interim
- Preceded by: Hans van Tuyll van Serooskerken
- Succeeded by: Henk Vonhoff

Personal details
- Born: Hendrik Jan Zeevalking; 7 June 1922 Laag-Keppel, Netherlands
- Died: 23 February 2005 (aged 82) Delft, Netherlands
- Party: Democrats 66 (from 1966)
- Other political affiliations: People's Party for Freedom and Democracy (1956–1966)
- Spouse: Dinie Brugman (m. 1948)
- Children: 3 children
- Education: Utrecht University (Bachelor of Laws, Master of Laws)
- Occupation: Politician · Jurist · Lawyer · Businessman · Corporate director · Nonprofit director · Academic administrator · Author

Hendrik Jan "Henk" Zeevalking (7 June 1922 – 23 February 2005) was a Dutch politician and co-founder of the Democrats 66 (D66) party and jurist.

Zeevalking attended a Gymnasium in Utrecht from April 1934 until June 1940 and applied at the Utrecht University in January 1946 majoring in Law and obtaining a Bachelor of Laws degree in August 1946 before graduating with a Master of Laws degree in December 1947. Zeevalking worked as a researcher at the Utrecht University from December 1947 until February 1950. Zeevalking worked as a criminal defense lawyer in Utrecht from February 1950 until September 1970. Zeevalking served on the Municipal Council of Utrecht from April 1970 until June 1975 and served as an Alderman in Utrecht from September 1970 until September 1974. Zeevalking served as acting Mayor of Utrecht from 1 February 1974 until 6 September 1974 following the retirement of Hans van Tuyll van Serooskerken.

Zeevalking was appointed as State Secretary for Justice in the Cabinet Den Uyl following the resignation of Jan Glastra van Loon, taking office on 6 June 1975. The Cabinet Den Uyl fell on 22 March 1977 after four years of tensions in the coalition and continued to serve in a demissionary capacity. Zeevalking was elected as a Member of the House of Representatives after the election of 1977, taking office on 8 June 1977 but he was still serving in the cabinet and because of dualism customs in the constitutional convention of Dutch politics he couldn't serve a dual mandate. He subsequently resigned as State Secretary for Justice on 8 September 1977. In December 1978 Zeevalking was nominated as Mayor of Rijswijk, he was installed as Mayor, taking office on 16 January 1979 and subsequently resigned as a Member of the House of Representatives on 24 January 1979. Zeevalking also served as Chairman of the Democrats 66 from 27 October 1979 until 11 September 1981. After the election of 1981 Zeevalking was appointed as Minister of Transport and Water Management in the Cabinet Van Agt II, taking office on 11 September 1981. The Cabinet Van Agt II fell just seven months into its term on 12 May 1982 after months of tensions in the coalition and continued to serve in a demissionary capacity until the first cabinet formation of 1982 when it was replaced by the caretaker Cabinet Van Agt III with Zeevalking continuing as Minister of Transport and Water Management, taking office on 29 May 1982. In August 1982 Zeevalking announced his retirement from national politics and that he wouldn't stand for the election of 1982. The Cabinet Van Agt III was replaced by the Cabinet Lubbers I following the second cabinet formation of 1982 on 4 November 1982.

== Biography ==
=== Early life ===
Hendrik Jan Zeevalking was born on 7 June 1922 in a Dutch Reformed family in Laag-Keppel, a village in the municipality Bronckhorst situated in the province of Gelderland. He studied Law at the Utrecht University from 1946 until 1947.

=== Politics ===
He was co-founder of the social-liberal political party Democrats 66 (D66) in 1966. He served as vicechair of the party from 1968 to 1969 and as chair from 1979 to 1981. He served as an alderman of traffic and public works in Utrecht (1970–1974). He was State Secretary for Justice in the Den Uyl cabinet (1975–1977), mayor of Rijswijk (1979–1981), and Minister of Transport, Public Works and Water Management (1981–1982).

Zeevalking was a member of the Protestant Church in the Netherlands. He was also an active Freemason and published several books on freemasonry.

== Decorations ==
Honours
| Ribbon bar | Honour | Country | Date | Comment |
| | Officer of the Legion of Honour | France | 17 February 1977 | |
| | Knight of the Order of the Netherlands Lion | Netherlands | 11 April 1978 | |
| | Grand Officer of the Order of Leopold II | Belgium | 21 March 1982 | |
| | Knight Commander of the Order of Merit | Germany | 30 September 1982 | |
| | Grand Officer of the Order of Orange-Nassau | Netherlands | 9 December 1982 | |
| | Commander of the National Order of Merit | France | 18 August 1994 | |

Party political offices
| Preceded by Jan Glastra van Loon | Chairman of the Democrats 66; 1979–1981 | Succeeded by Cees Spigt; Ad interim |
Political offices
| Preceded by Hans van Tuyll van Serooskerken | Mayor of Utrecht; 1974; Ad interim | Succeeded by Henk Vonhoff |
| Preceded by Jan Glastra van Loon | State Secretary for Justice; 1975–1977 | Succeeded by Bert Haars |
| Preceded by Hans Grosheide | Mayor of Rijswijk; 1979–1981 | Succeeded by Riet Daamen-van Houte |
| Preceded by Dany Tuijnman | Minister of Transport and Water Management; 1981–1982 | Succeeded by Neelie Kroes |
Academic offices
| Preceded by Dolf Cohen | Chairman of the Supervisory board of the Delft University of Technology; 1985–1988 | Succeeded by Jan Beenakker |
