= Bert Schwarz =

Belgian-born Dutch politician

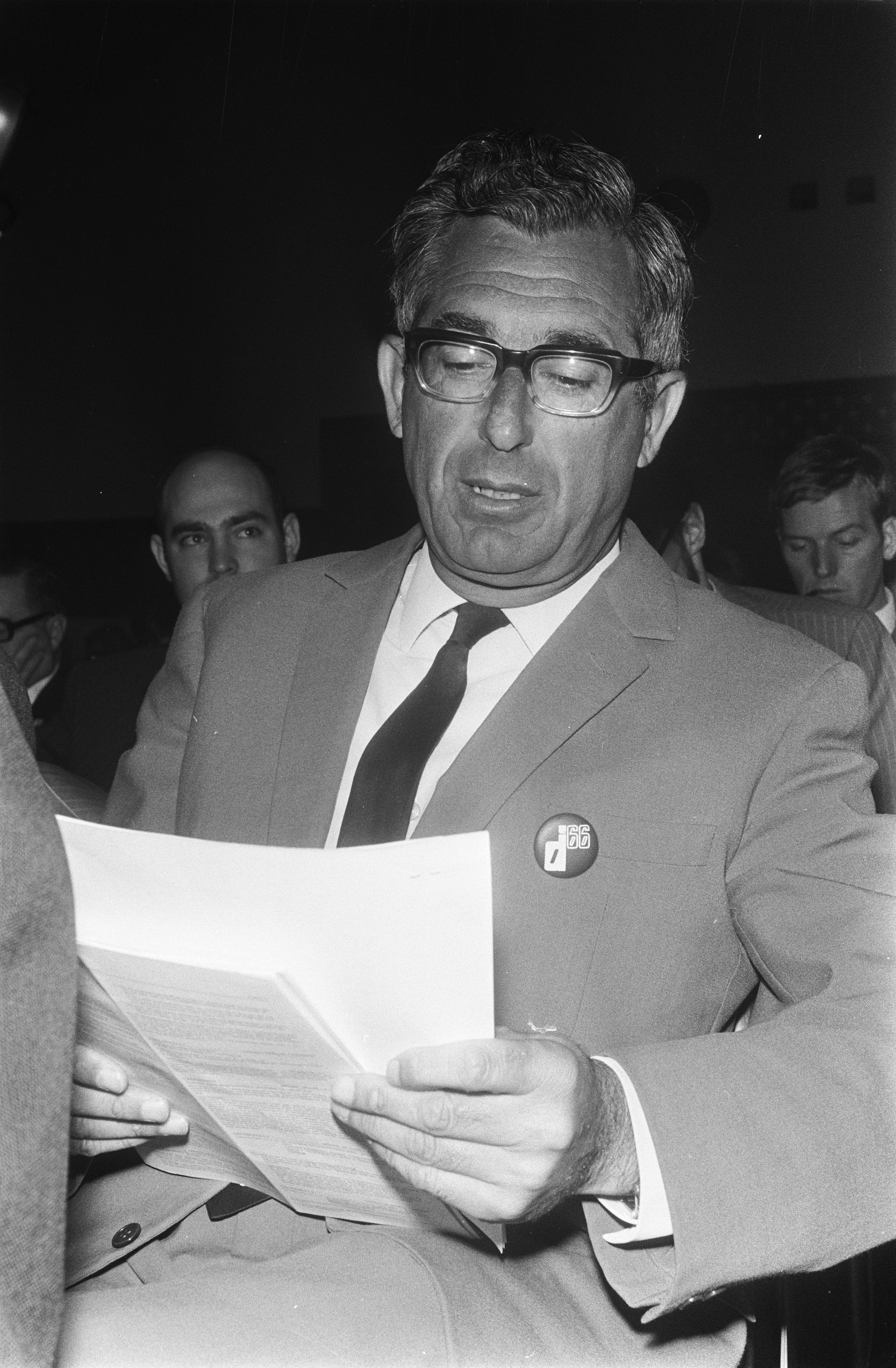
Bert Schwarz (1970)

Norbert Friedrich Isidor "Bert Schwarz" (18 December 1917 – 6 October 1999) was a Belgium-born Dutch politician of the Democrats 66 (D66) party. He was a Member of the Senate from 11 May 1971 until 20 September 1977.
