= Hans van Mierlo Foundation =

Dutch policy institute

- Mr. Hans van Mierlo Foundation
- Mr. Hans van Mierlo Stichting
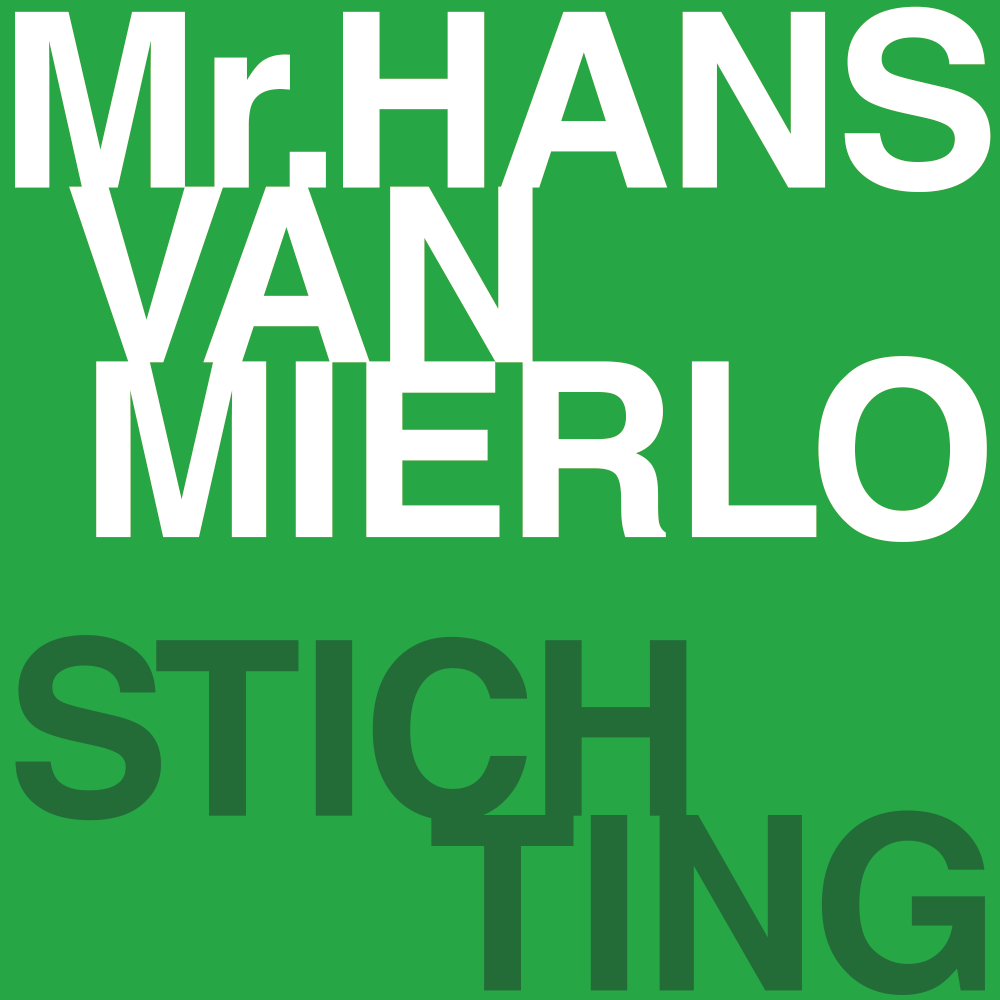
- logo in 2020
- Formation: 1972
- Type: Policy institute
- Location: The Netherlands
- Affiliations: Democrats 66

The Mr. Hans van Mierlo Foundation (Dutch: Mr. Hans van Mierlo Stichting) is a Dutch policy institute linked to the Democrats 66 (D66) party. The foundation is named after journalist and politician Hans van Mierlo, the co-founder of the Democrats 66. The institute was formed in 1972 as the (Dutch: Stichting Wetenschappelijk Bureau) and was renamed the (Dutch: Kenniscentrum D66) in 2003. On 7 May 2011 the institute was renamed again in honor of co-founder Hans van Mierlo, who had died on 11 March 2010.

The organisation is a member of the European Liberal Forum, a think-tank affiliated with the Alliance of Liberals and Democrats for Europe Party and the Renew Europe group in the European Parliament.

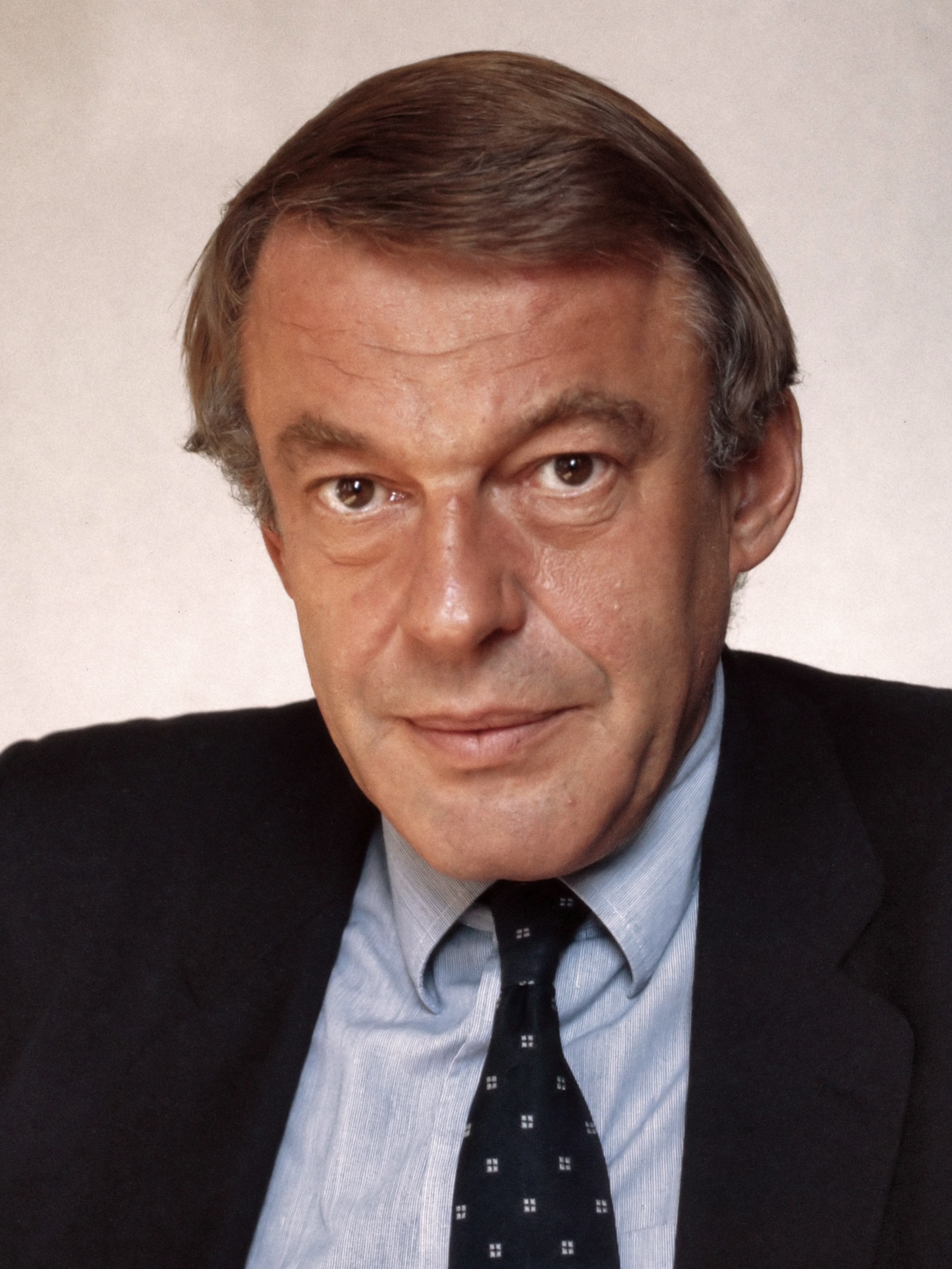
Hans van Mierlo the eponymous namesake of the Foundation.
