= Paul van Meenen =

Dutch politician (born 1956)

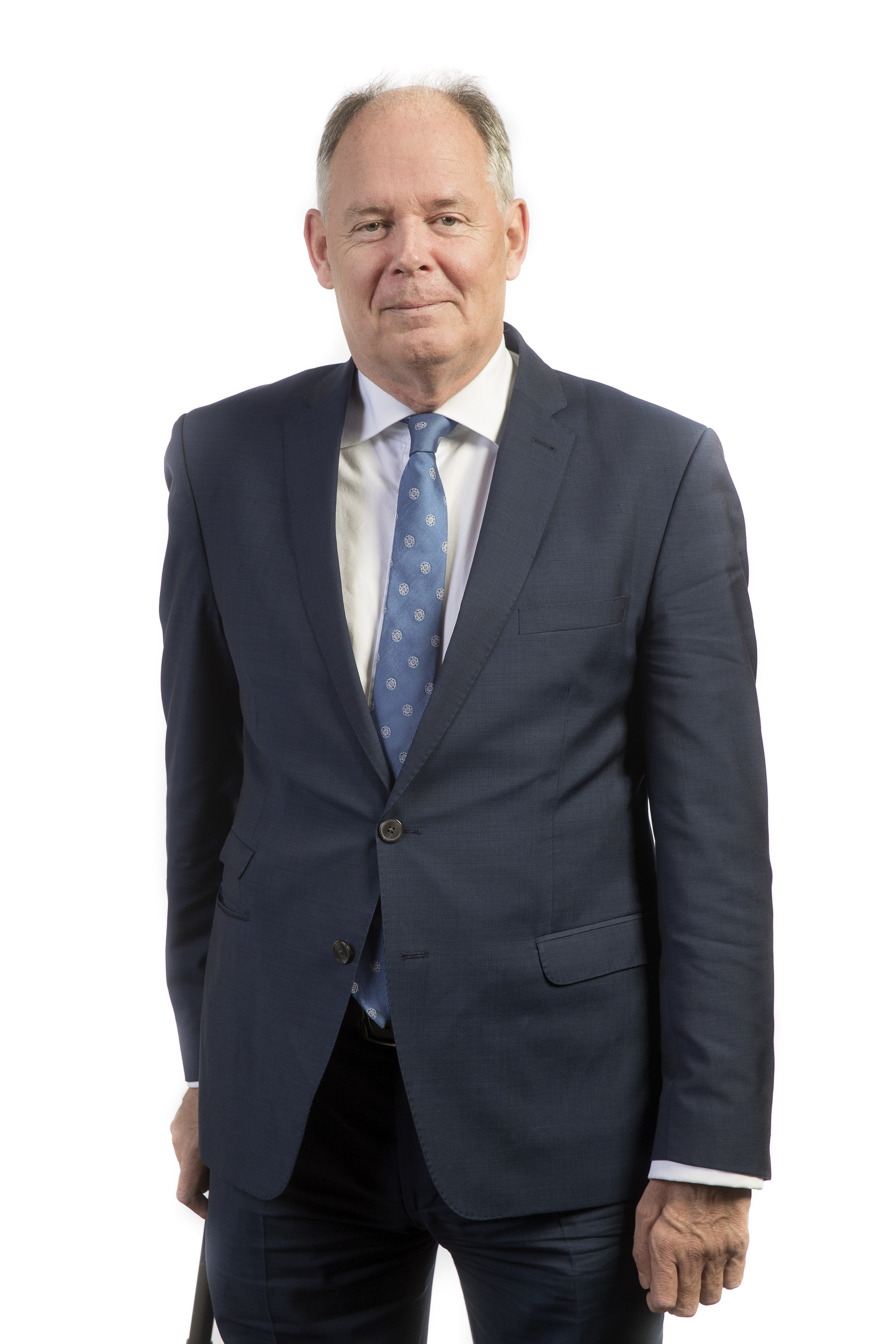

Member of the House of Representatives
- In office 20 September 2012 – 3 July 2023

Member of the Senate
- Incumbent
- Assumed office 4 July 2023

Personal details
- Born: Paul Hendrik van Meenen; 29 January 1956 (age 70) The Hague, Netherlands
- Party: Democrats 66
- Spouse: Anke van Vuuren
- Children: 2
- Education: Leiden University
- Occupation: Politician; Teacher/School administrator

Paul Hendrik van Meenen (born 29 January 1956) is a Dutch politician of the Democrats 66 (D66) political party.

== Career ==
Van Meenen worked as the director for Spinoza, an organisation of ten VWO high schools in the region of The Hague. He served as the leader of the D66 grouping in the municipal council of Leiden starting in 2002. Van Meenen became a member of the Dutch House of Representatives on 20 September 2012, after having been elected in the 12 September general election. He became a member of the Dutch senate in 2023. A motion by Van Meenen was passed in November 2024 calling on the Schoof cabinet to keep the commitment of its predecessor to allow Afghan guards of the Dutch embassy and Task Force Uruzgan to relocate to the Netherlands. The promise was made in response to the 2021 Taliban offensive, but it was reversed by the Schoof cabinet.

== Electoral history ==
Electoral history of Paul van Meenen
| Year | Body | Party | Pos. | Votes | Result | | Ref. |
| Year | Body | Party | Pos. | Votes | Party seats | Individual | Ref. |
|---|---|---|---|---|---|---|---|
| 2021 | House of Representatives | Democrats 66 | 11 | 1,692 | 24 | Won | |
