= Anne-Marie Spierings =

Party chair of Democrats 66

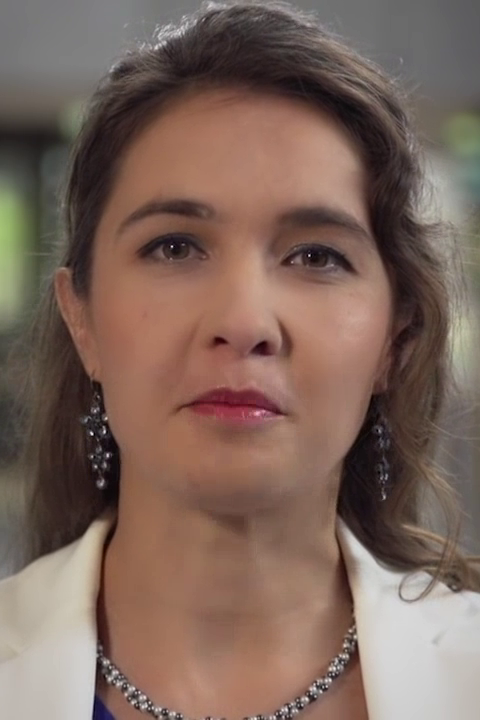
- Spierings in 2015

Party chair of Democrats 66
- Incumbent
- Assumed office 6 October 2018
- Preceded by: Letty Demmers

Member of the Provincial Council of North Brabant
- Incumbent
- Assumed office 22 January 2021
- In office 28 March 2019 – 14 June 2019
- In office March 2011 – May 2015

Deputy of North Brabant
- In office May 2015 – May 2020

Personal details
- Born: Maria Johanna Geertruda Spierings; 28 September 1976 (age 50) Heesch, Netherlands
- Party: Democrats 66
- Education: Radboud University Nijmegen

Maria Johanna Geertruda "Anne-Marie" Spierings (born 28 September 1976) is a Dutch politician of Democrats 66 (D66). She has served as the party's chairperson since 6 October 2018 until 2021, and has been a member of the Provincial Council of North Brabant since 22 January 2021.

== Early life and education ==
Spierings was born in Heesch, North Brabant. She studied environmental science at Radboud University in Nijmegen.

== Career ==
From 1999 to 2015, Spierings worked at Arcadis, a Dutch consulting firm. In 2011, she was elected into the Provincial Council of North Brabant as a member of D66. She was re-elected in 2015, but left the council to become a deputy in the provincial executive. Her portfolio included agricultural development, energy and governance.

On 6 October 2018, Spierings was elected party chair of D66. On 22 January 2021, she was re-installed as a member of the Provincial Council of North Brabant, replacing Eric Logister.

== Electoral history ==
A (possibly incomplete) overview of Dutch elections Spierings participated in
Election	Party	Candidate number	Votes
2015 Dutch provincial elections in North Brabant	Democrats 66		
2019 Dutch provincial elections in North Brabant	Democrats 66	1	
2022 Dutch municipal elections in Sint-Michielsgestel	Democrats 66	13	20
