= Jan Paternotte =

Dutch politician (born 1984)

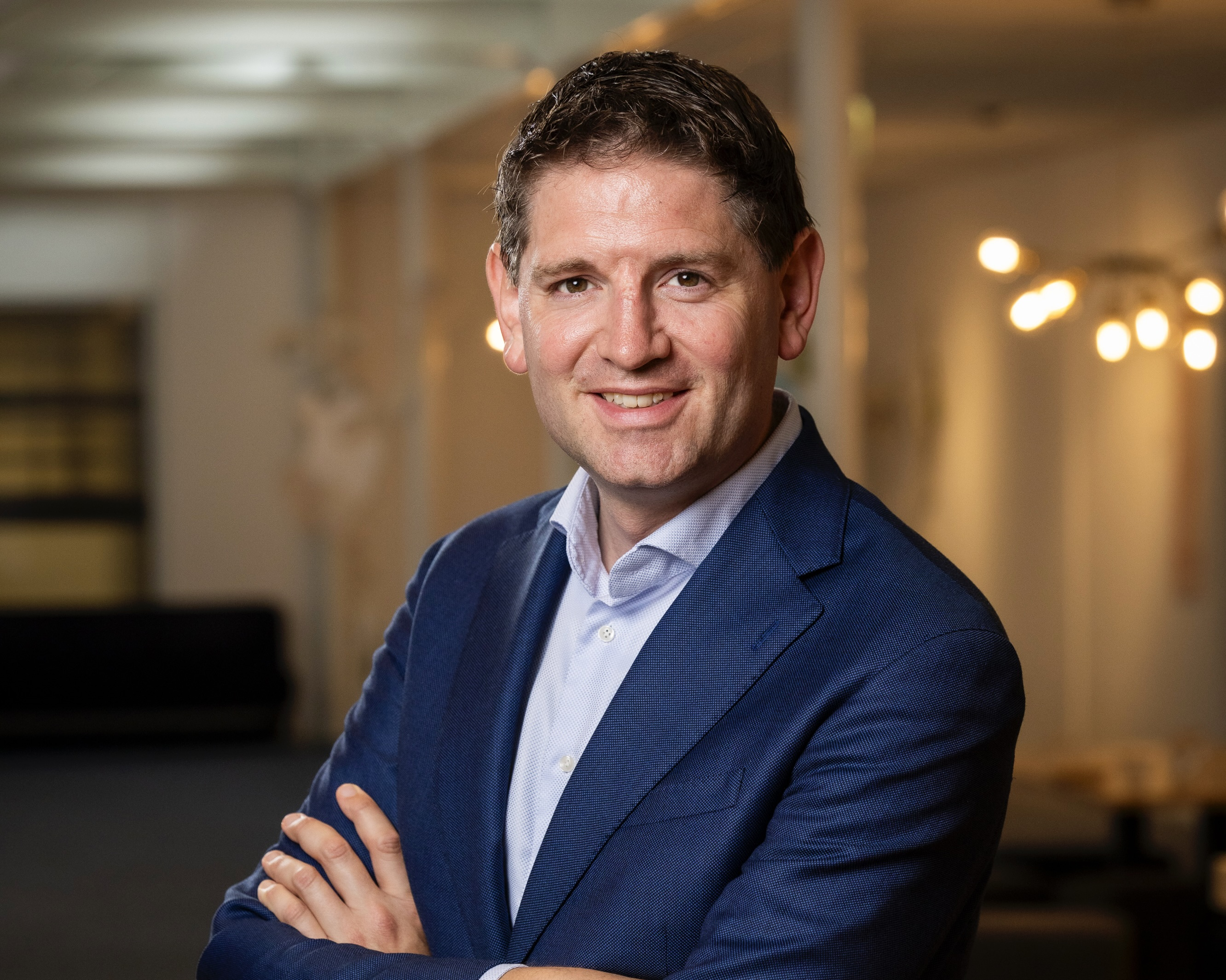
- Paternotte in 2026

Leader of the Democrats 66 in the House of Representatives
- Incumbent
- Assumed office 23 February 2026
- Preceded by: Rob Jetten

Member of the House of Representatives
- Incumbent
- Assumed office 23 March 2017

Member of the Municipal Council of Amsterdam
- In office 11 March 2010 – 1 April 2017

Chair of the Young Democrats
- In office 2004–2005

Personal details
- Born: Jan Maarten Paternotte; 26 February 1984 (age 42) 's-Hertogenbosch, Netherlands
- Party: Democrats 66
- Spouse: Lise-Lotte Kerkhof
- Children: 2
- Education: University of Amsterdam

Jan Maarten Paternotte (born 26 February 1984) is a Dutch politician of the Democrats 66 (D66). He has been a member of the House of Representatives since March 2017, and he served as his party's parliamentary leader from January 2022 until December 2023.

== Early life and education ==
Paternotte was born in 's-Hertogenbosch, North Brabant and grew up in the villages of Hurwenen, Maarssen and Groenekan. He studied international relations at the University of Amsterdam. In 2012, he obtained a degree in European law.

== Career ==
In 2004, Paternotte became the chair of the Young Democrats, a political youth organisation affiliated with D66. On 11 March 2010, he was elected into the municipal council of Amsterdam. In the same year, he participated in the 2010 Dutch general election as the twelfth candidate on the list of D66, but was not elected into the House of Representatives.

While a member of the municipal council, Paternotte worked as a policy advisor to MEP Marietje Schaake. In the 2014 Dutch municipal elections, he was the lead candidate for D66 in Amsterdam. Under his leadership, D66 became the largest party in the municipal council. Paternotte left the council in 2017, when he was elected into the House of Representatives. He was re-elected in 2021.

On 11 January 2022, he became the parliamentary leader of D66 in the House of Representatives, after both Sigrid Kaag and Rob Jetten joined the fourth Rutte cabinet as ministers. (Note: In the Netherlands, ministers and state secretaries are not members of parliament, with the possible exception of the period between an election and the accession of the new cabinet.) Paternotte received a third House term in the November 2023 general election, and he was succeeded by Jetten as parliamentary leader. He became D66's spokesperson for foreign affairs, kingdom relations, housing, higher education, and media.

Paternotte introduced a motion backed by a majority of parties calling for Taiwan to be admitted as a member to more international organisations, to prevent its further isolation by the People's Republic of China. With CDA leader Henri Bontenbal, he requested Prime Minister Dick Schoof to advocate for a suspension of Hungary from the Schengen Area out of fear it was admitting Russian spies due to insufficient vetting. He co-wrote a bill to lift a ban on cultivating embryos for scientific research, hoping to raise the success rate for IVF treatment. Paternotte's second daughter was born after six attempts.

== Personal life ==
Paternotte has two daughters with his spouse Lise-Lotte Kerkhof, and lives in Leiden.

== Electoral history ==
Electoral history of Jan Paternotte
Year	Body	Party	Pos.	Votes	Result		Ref.
Year	Body	Party	Pos.	Votes	Party seats	Individual	Ref.
2010	House of Representatives	Democrats 66	12	1,280	10	Lost	
2017	House of Representatives	Democrats 66	9	2,991	19	Won	
2021	House of Representatives	Democrats 66	4	6,685	24	Won	
2023	House of Representatives	Democrats 66	2	19,645	9	Won	
2025	House of Representatives	Democrats 66	2	39,801	26	Won	
