= Gerben-Jan Gerbrandy =

Dutch politician

Gerben-Jan Gerbrandy MEP
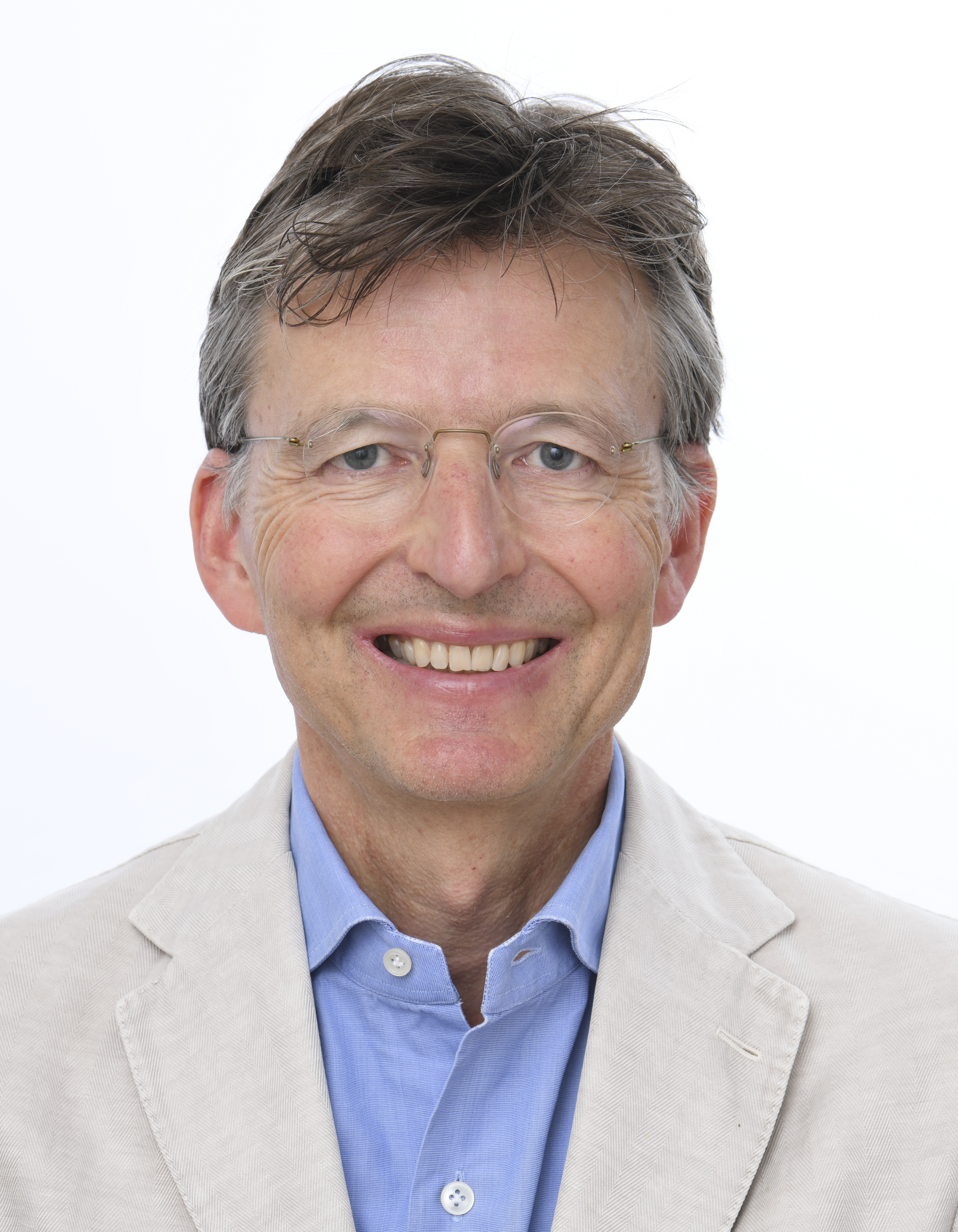
- Official portrait, 2024

Delegation leader of Democrats 66 in the European Parliament
- Incumbent
- Assumed office 16 July 2024

Member of the European Parliament
- Incumbent
- Assumed office 16 July 2024
- In office 14 July 2009 – 1 July 2019
- Constituency: Netherlands

Personal details
- Born: Gerben-Jan Gerbrandy; 28 June 1967 (age 59) The Hague, Netherlands
- Party: Dutch: Democrats 66; EU: Alliance of Liberals and Democrats for Europe
- Education: University of Amsterdam
- Website: www.gerbrandy.eu

Gerben-Jan Meindert Gerbrandy (born 28 June 1967) is a Dutch politician who has been a Member of the European Parliament (MEP) since 2024. He previously served on the body from 2009 until 2019. He is a member of Democrats 66, part of the Alliance of Liberals and Democrats for Europe.

== Political career ==
Gerbrandy is a member of liberal party Democrats 66.

Gerbrandy first became a Member of the European Parliament (MEP) in the 2009 elections. Throughout his time in parliament, he served on the Committee on the Environment, Public Health and Food Safety. Between 2012 and 2014, he was the committee’s vice-chairman. In this capacity, he chaired part of the negotiations on an EU ban on ‘invasive alien species’ that have a negative impact on the environment. He was also part of the European Parliament’s delegations to the 2014 United Nations Climate Change Conference in Lima; the 2015 United Nations Climate Change Conference in Paris; and the 2016 United Nations Climate Change Conference in Marrakesh.

In 2016, Gerbrandy joined the Committee of Inquiry into Emission Measurements in the Automotive Sector. That same year, he was appointed as the parliament’s rapporteur on national emissions reduction targets.

Between 2009 and 2014, Gerbrandy also served on the Committee on Budgetary Control. In this capacity, he drafted the committee’s opinion on the spending of the more than 30 agencies of the European Union in 2013.

In addition, Gebrandy was the vice chairman of the European Parliament Intergroup on Seas, Rivers, Islands and Coastal Areas as well as a member of the European Parliament Intergroup on the Welfare and Conservation of Animals. He was also a supporter of the MEP Heart Group, a group of parliamentarians who have an interest in promoting measures that will help reduce the burden of cardiovascular diseases (CVD). Gerbrandy's second term as MEP ended in 2019.

In 2023, Gerbrandy stood as a candidate to be D66's lead candidate in the upcoming June 2024 European Parliament election. He went on to win the internal election. D66 won three seats in the European Parliament, and Gerbrandy was elected. His term started on 16 July 2024, and he became his party's delegation leader and Vice-President of Renew Europe.

== Electoral history ==
Electoral history of Gerben-Jan Gerbrandy
Year	Body	Party	Pos.	Votes	Result		Ref.
Year	Body	Party	Pos.	Votes	Party seats	Individual	Ref.
2024	European Parliament	Democrats 66	1	253,866	3	Won	
