= Democrats 66 =

Political party in the Netherlands

Democrats 66 Democraten 66
- Abbreviation: D66
- Leader: Rob Jetten (list)
- Chairperson: Alexandra van Huffelen
- Leader in the Senate: Paul van Meenen
- Leader in the House of Representatives: Jan Paternotte
- Leader in the EP: Gerben-Jan Gerbrandy
- Founders: Hans van Mierlo; Hans Gruijters
- Founded: 14 October 1966
- Headquarters: Lange Houtstraat 11, The Hague
- Youth wing: Young Democrats
- Policy institute: Hans van Mierlo Foundation
- Membership (2026): ▲36,627
- Ideology: Social liberalism; Progressivism
- Political position: Centre to centre-left
- Regional affiliation: Liberal Group
- European affiliation: Alliance of Liberals and Democrats for Europe
- European Parliament group: Renew Europe
- International affiliation: Liberal International
- Colours: Green; White
- Senate: 7 / 75
- House of Representatives: 26 / 150
- Provincial councils: 33 / 570
- European Parliament: 3 / 31
- Benelux Parliament: 4 / 21

Website
- d66.nl

Democrats 66 (Dutch: Democraten 66; (Note: Officially, Politieke Partij Democraten 66, pronounced [poːliˈtikə pɑrˈtɛi deːmoːˈkraːtə(n) ˌzɛsɛ(n)ˈzɛstəx], lit. 'Political Party Democrats 66'.) D66) is a social-liberal and progressive political party in the Netherlands, which is positioned on the centre to centre-left of the political spectrum. It is a member of the Liberal International (LI) and the Alliance of Liberals and Democrats for Europe (ALDE). The party is led by Rob Jetten, who was elected party leader on 12 August 2023. Paul van Meenen, Jan Paternotte and Gerben-Jan Gerbrandy are serving as the party's parliamentary leaders in the Senate, the House of Representatives and the European Parliament respectively.

Its name refers to its year of foundation, 1966. Initially, its main objective had been to reform the Dutch political system, but it developed a broader social liberal ideology over time. D66 is especially popular among people who hold a university degree, and its voters are mostly concentrated in larger cities and in municipalities with an above-average number of wealthy residents. The party supplies a relatively large proportion of mayors, who are appointed rather than elected.

In the 1967 general election, D66 won seven out of 150 seats in the House of Representatives, the largest total by a new party at the time. The party was in government from 1973 to 1977, 1981 to 1982, 1994 to 2002, 2003 to 2006, 2017 to 2024, and from 2026 to the present, leading the latter government. It currently holds 26 seats in the House of Representatives, making it the largest parliamentary party, and Rob Jetten is the current Prime Minister of the Netherlands. The party also holds seven seats in the Senate and three seats in the European Parliament.

== History ==
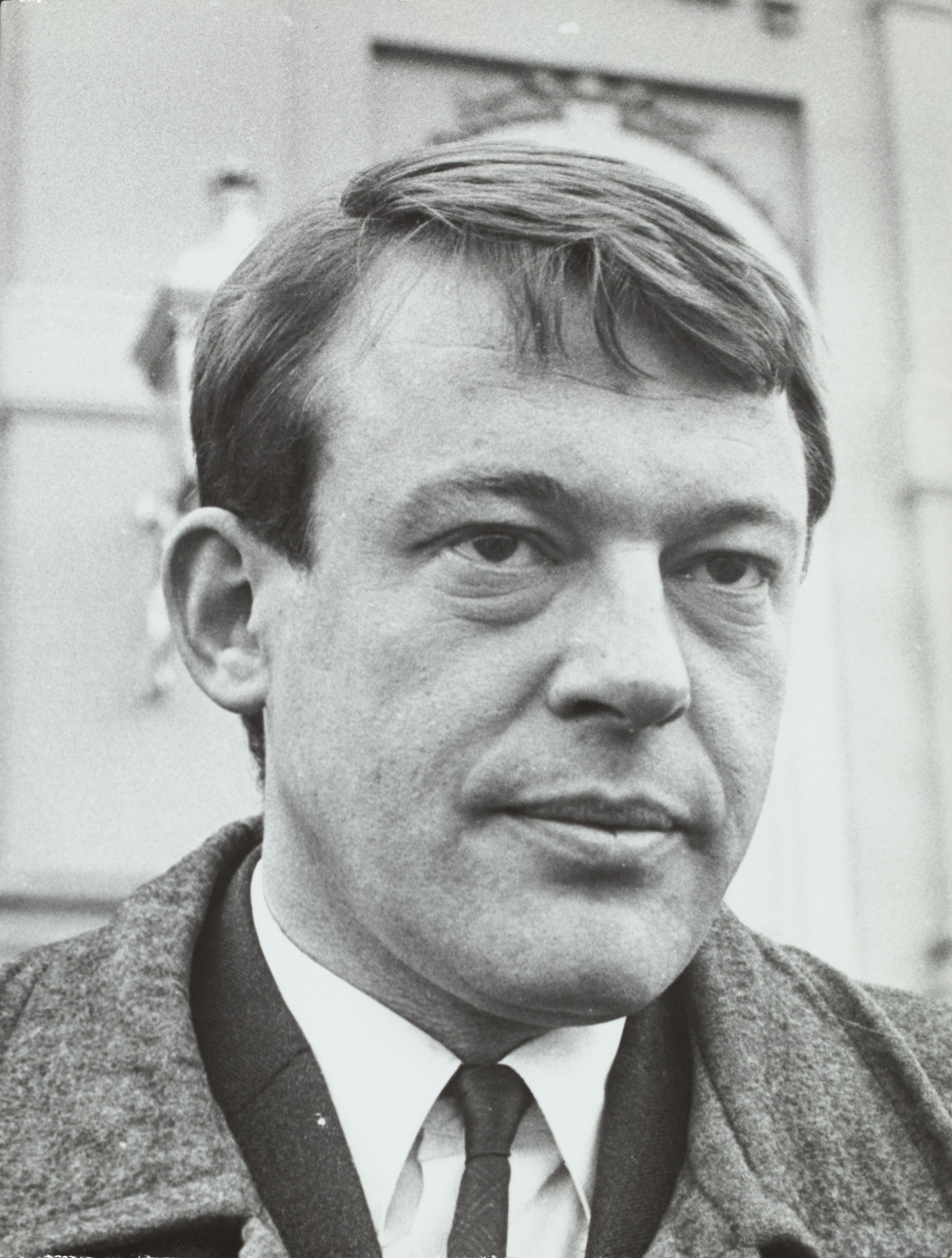
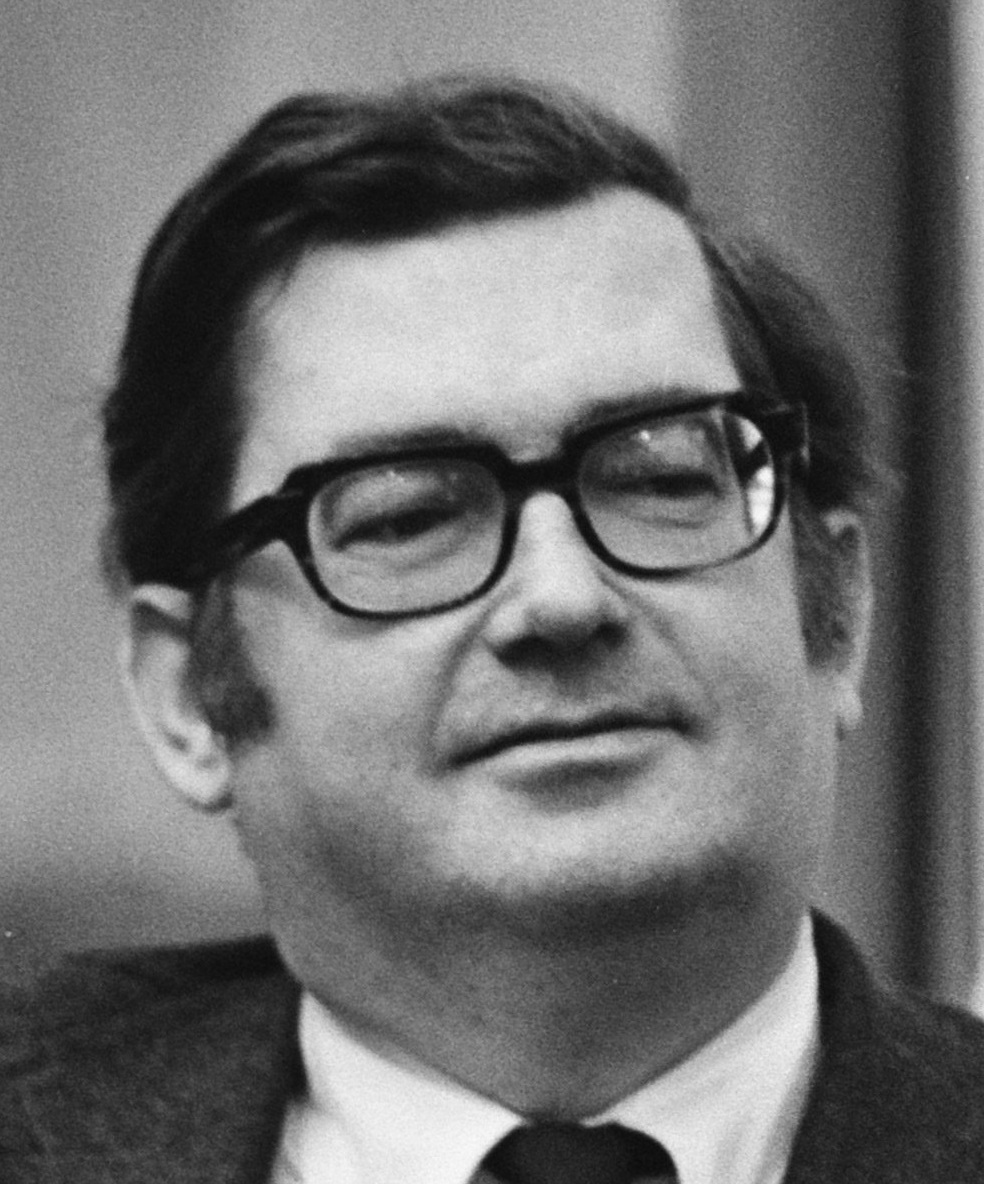
Founders Hans van Mierlo and Hans Gruijters

=== Early years (1966–1986) ===
Democrats 66 was founded on 14 October 1966 by a group of 44 people. Its founders were described as homines novi, although 25 of the 44 had previously been members of another political party. The initiators were Hans van Mierlo, a journalist for the Algemeen Handelsblad, and Hans Gruijters, a municipal councillor in Amsterdam for the People's Party for Freedom and Democracy (VVD). Van Mierlo became the party's political leader. The foundation of the party was preceded by the "Appeal 1966" on 10 October. The party renounced the 19th-century political ideologies, which dominated the political system and sought to end pillarisation. It called for radical reform of the Dutch political system, and for pragmatic and scientific policy-making.

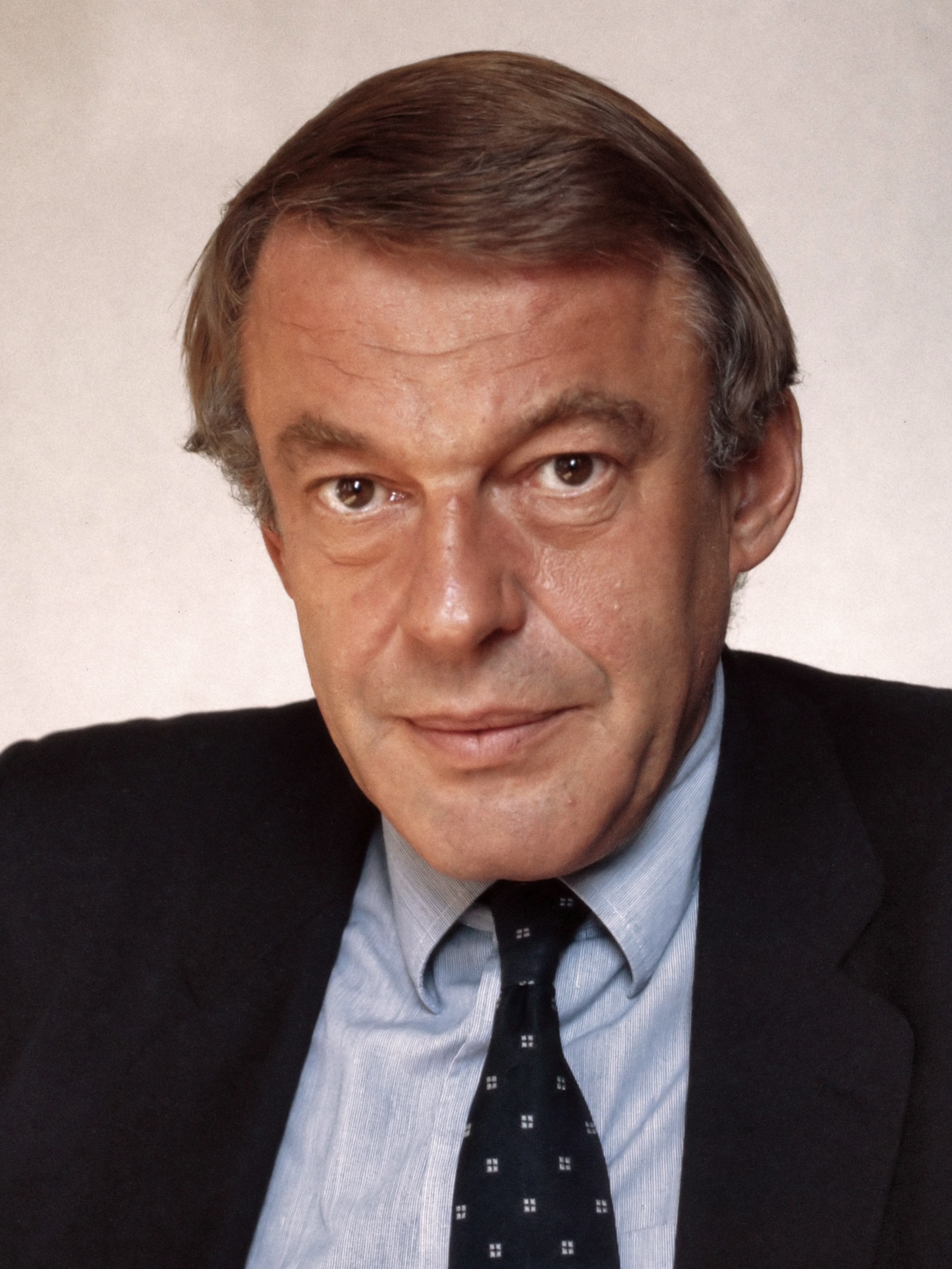
Hans van Mierlo, co-founder and leader between 1966–1973 and 1986–1998

The party participated in the 1967 general election, with Hans van Mierlo as its lead candidate. The party won an unprecedented seven seats in the House of Representatives. In the 1971 general election, the party won an additional four seats and it formed a shadow cabinet with the Labour Party (PvdA) and the Political Party of Radicals (PPR). In the 1972 general election, the three parties formed a political alliance called the "Progressive Agreement" (Dutch: Progressief Akkoord; PAK) and presented the common electoral program "Turning Point '72" (Keerpunt '72).

In the election, D66 lost nearly half its seats, retaining only six. The alliance became the largest political force in the country, but it did not gain a majority. After long cabinet formation talks, the three PAK-parties formed an extra-parliamentary cabinet joined by progressive members of the Anti-Revolutionary Party (ARP) and the Catholic People's Party (KVP). The cabinet was led by Labour politician Joop den Uyl. Co-founder Hans Gruijters became Minister of Housing and Spatial Planning. After the formation talks, Van Mierlo left politics, feeling that his political position within the parliamentary party was untenable. Van Mierlo was replaced by Jan Terlouw, who became the new parliamentary leader.

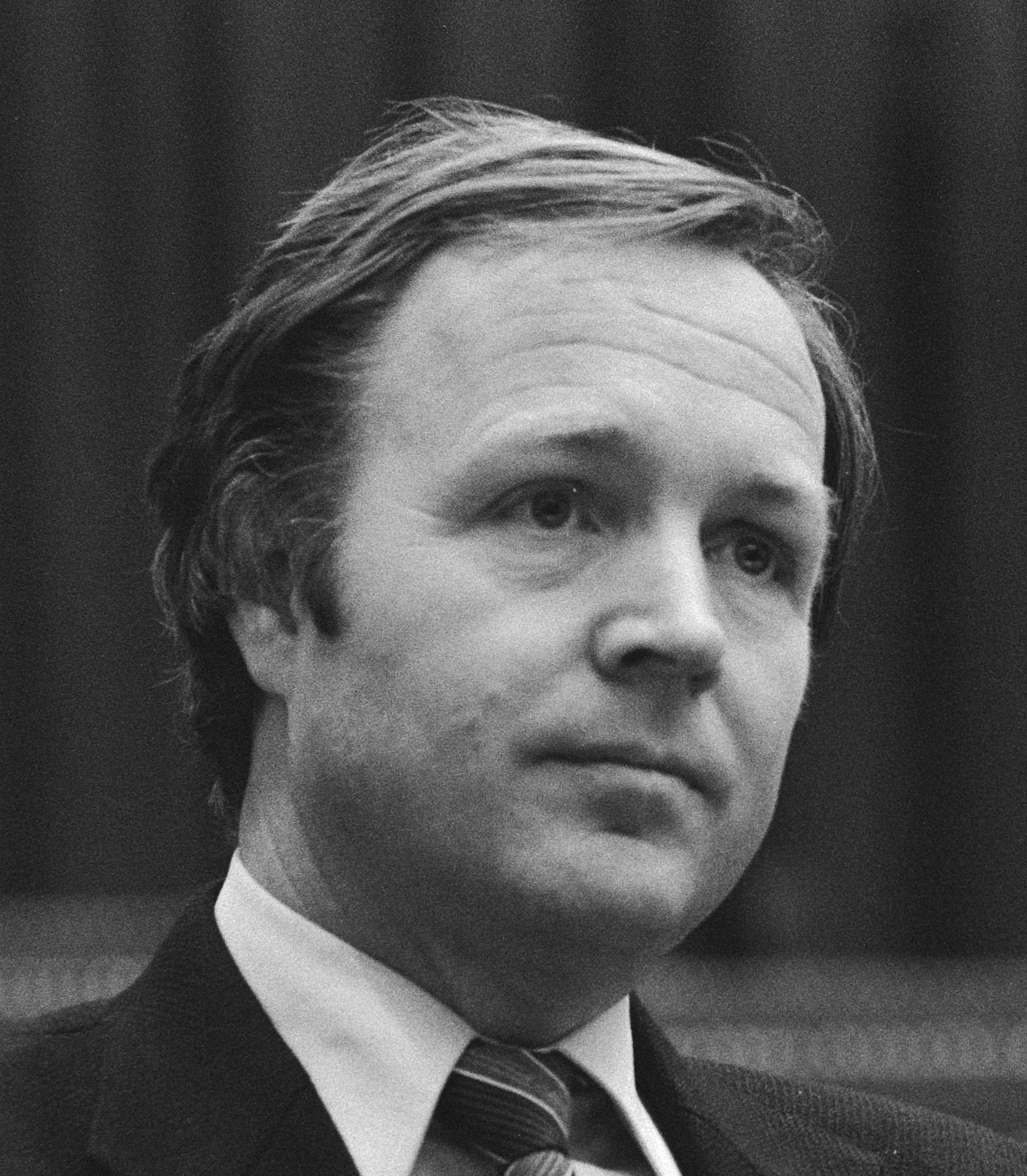
Jan Terlouw, leader from 1973 to 1982

In the period 1972–1974, the party had a dramatic loss of members (from 6,000 to 300) and polled very poorly in the 1974 provincial elections. The party also lost half of its senators in the 1974 Senate election. At one of the party congresses, a motion was put forth to abolish the party. A majority of the members voted in favour, but the two-thirds majority was not reached. In reaction, Terlouw started a campaign to revitalise the party, involving a membership drive and a petition to the electorate. He emphasised issues other than political reform and gave the party a more liberal orientation. The party doubled its membership in 1975 and won two additional seats in the 1977 general election, despite losing all its seats in the Senate in the same year.

In the 1981 general election, D66 gained 17 seats. The party formed a government with the Labour Party and the Christian Democratic Appeal (CDA), with Terlouw as Minister of Economic Affairs. The cabinet was characterised by the personal and ideological conflicts between Prime Minister Dries van Agt (CDA) and Minister of Social Affairs Joop den Uyl (PvdA). The cabinet fell nine months after it was formed, when the Labour Party left the cabinet. D66 and the CDA continued to govern in a caretaker government. In the subsequent 1982 general election, D66 lost two-thirds of its support, and was left with only 6 seats. After the election, Terlouw left politics and was replaced by Maarten Engwirda. The party was confined to opposition.

=== Purple cabinets and demise (1986–2006) ===
In 1986, Van Mierlo returned to politics. He emphasised democratic reform as the core issue of the party and wanted to end the polarisation between the Labour Party and VVD, so that it would be possible to form a government without the CDA. He led the party in the 1986 general election and won nine seats. In the 1989 election, the party won 12 seats and was asked to join the formation talks of a CDA–PvdA–D66 coalition. While the PvdA preferred to form a government with D66, the CDA did not. Ultimately, D66 was excluded from the coalition, because it was not necessary to include them to reach a majority in parliament.

Despite being in opposition, D66 adopted a constructive approach towards the government. They were rewarded for this in the 1994 general election, in which the party doubled its number of seats to 24. D66 was able to form its preferred coalition: the "purple government", which included both the social democratic PvdA and the conservative liberal VVD. Van Mierlo was appointed Minister of Foreign Affairs. As advocated by D66, the first Kok cabinet initiated progressive legislation, such as the introduction of same-sex marriage and the legalisation of euthanasia. The moderately liberal economic policies of the cabinet were also seen as a great success.

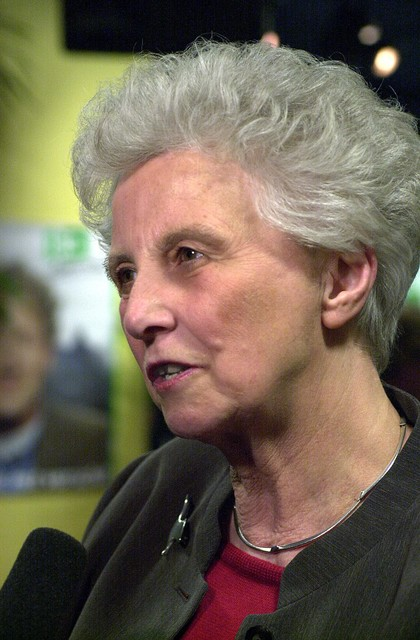
Els Borst, top candidate in the 1998 general election

Shortly before the 1998 general election, Van Mierlo stepped back and Minister of Health Els Borst became the new top candidate. D66 lost ten seats in the election, while its coalition partners gained ground at the cost of D66. The second Kok cabinet continued. Although D66 was technically not needed for a majority in parliament, it was seen as the glue that kept the PvdA and the VVD together. Borst stepped down as party leader and became Deputy Prime Minister and Minister of Health. Thom de Graaf led the party in the House of Representatives. From within the party, there were calls for a more explicit progressive liberal course. In 1999, a constitutional reform that would allow for referendums to be held was rejected by the Senate, because a group of VVD dissidents had voted against it. In response, D66 left the cabinet. After the subsequent formation talks, D66 returned to the cabinet in return for a temporary referendum law and directly elected mayors.

In the 2002 general election, the tide had turned against the purple government, and the right-wing populist Pim Fortuyn List (LPF) gained considerable ground. The three purple parties lost an unprecedented 43 seats. D66 was left with only seven seats. The first Balkenende cabinet, consisting of CDA, LPF and VVD, lasted only three months. In the 2003 general election, D66 lost another seat, leaving only 6. De Graaf stepped down and was succeeded by Boris Dittrich. After long formation talks between the CDA and the PvdA failed, a second Balkenende cabinet was formed, which included the CDA, the VVD and D66.

In return for investments in environment and education, and a special Minister for Governmental Reform, D66 supported the centre-right reform cabinet and some of its more controversial legislation. In May 2005, the Senate rejected a constitutional reform that would allow a directly elected mayor. The legislation had been introduced by the second Kok cabinet, but it was unable to get a two-thirds majority because the Labour Party was opposed the electoral system proposed by Minister for Governmental Reform Thom de Graaf. De Graaf resigned, but the rest of the ministers retained their positions as D66 was promised more investment in public education and the environment. A special party congress was called to ratify this so-called "Easter Agreement" (Paasakkoord). 2,600 members (20 per cent of total membership) were present and the congress was broadcast live on television. The congress agreed to remain in cabinet by a large majority. Alexander Pechtold replaced De Graaf as Minister for Governmental Reform. Laurens Jan Brinkhorst, the Minister of Economic Affairs, became Deputy Prime Minister.

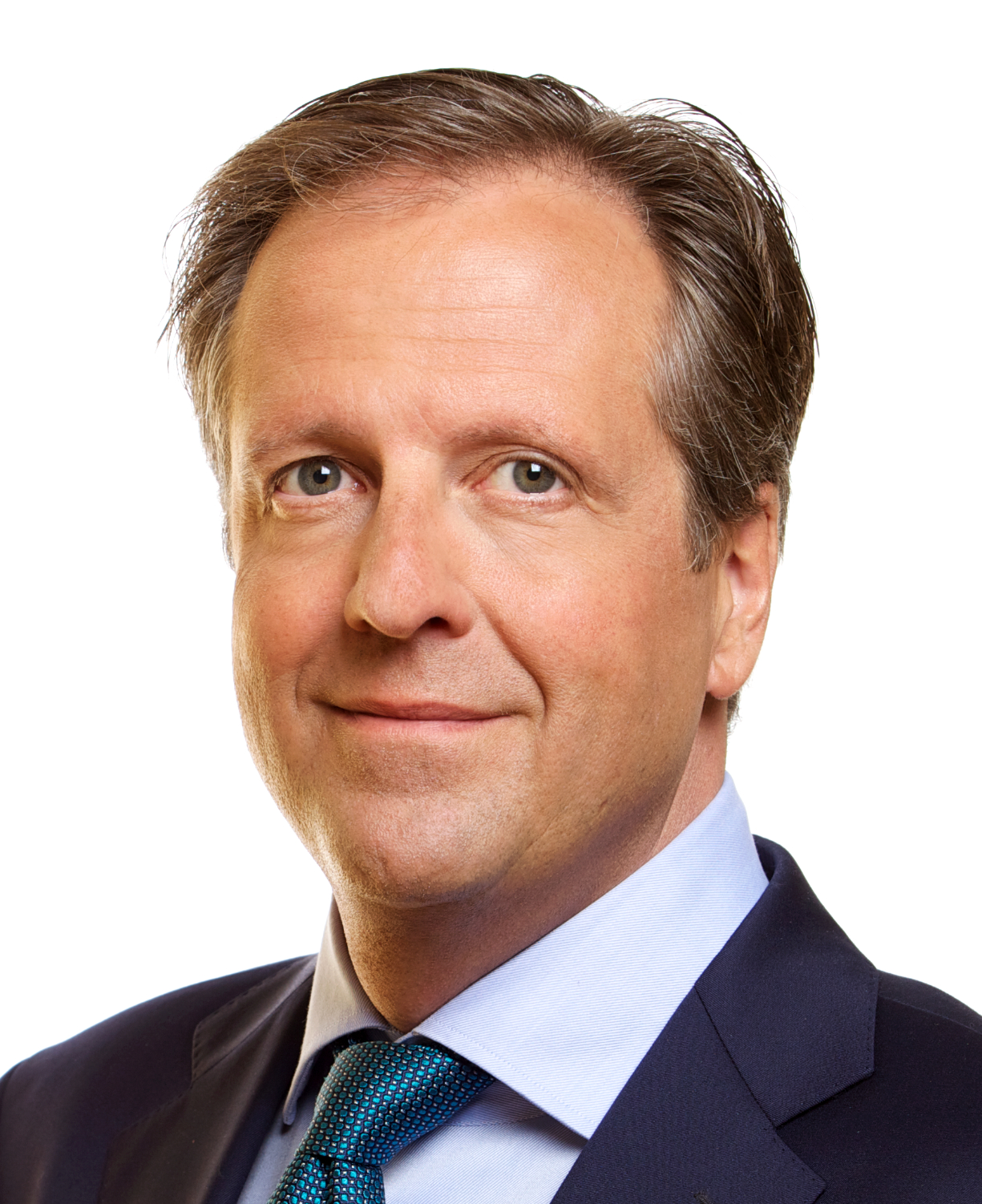
Alexander Pechtold, leader from 2006 to 2018

=== Pechtold leadership (2006–2016) ===
In February 2006, Dittrich stepped down as parliamentary leader, because he did not agree with the government's decision to send the Dutch armed forces to the southern province of Uruzgan in Afghanistan. D66 voted against the government's proposal together with the Socialist Party and GroenLinks. Dittrich stated that the mission to send troops was not a reconstruction mission (as the government and the majority of the Dutch parliament claimed), but a military operation. Lousewies van der Laan replaced Dittrich. In May 2006, D66 polled particularly badly in the 2006 municipal elections. D66 began to lose a considerable number of members, some of whom founded deZES, another radical democratic, progressive liberal party. During a special party congress on 13 May 2006, a motion was put forth demanding the withdrawal of D66 from the cabinet, but it was rejected. In June 2006, an internal election was held in order to choose the new party leader. The election was won by Alexander Pechtold.

During the special parliamentary debate on the naturalisation process of Ayaan Hirsi Ali, D66 supported a motion of no confidence against Minister for Integration Rita Verdonk. As D66 was a junior coalition partner, this caused a crisis in the second Balkenende cabinet. The cabinet refused to remove Verdonk from her position. Lousewies van der Laan, parliamentary leader of D66, felt that the D66 faction could no longer support the cabinet and stated that the cabinet had to resign. On 3 July 2006, the two D66 ministers Alexander Pechtold and Laurens Jan Brinkhorst resigned, causing the second Balkenende cabinet to fall.

In October 2006, just before the D66 party congress and its 40th anniversary as a party, D66 founder Hans van Mierlo asked the question whether D66 still had political legitimacy. He believed that many errors were made in recent history and that only the acceptance of these errors could provide for any credibility for D66. Van Mierlo declared his support for party leader Pechtold, who in his view could provide for such credibility.

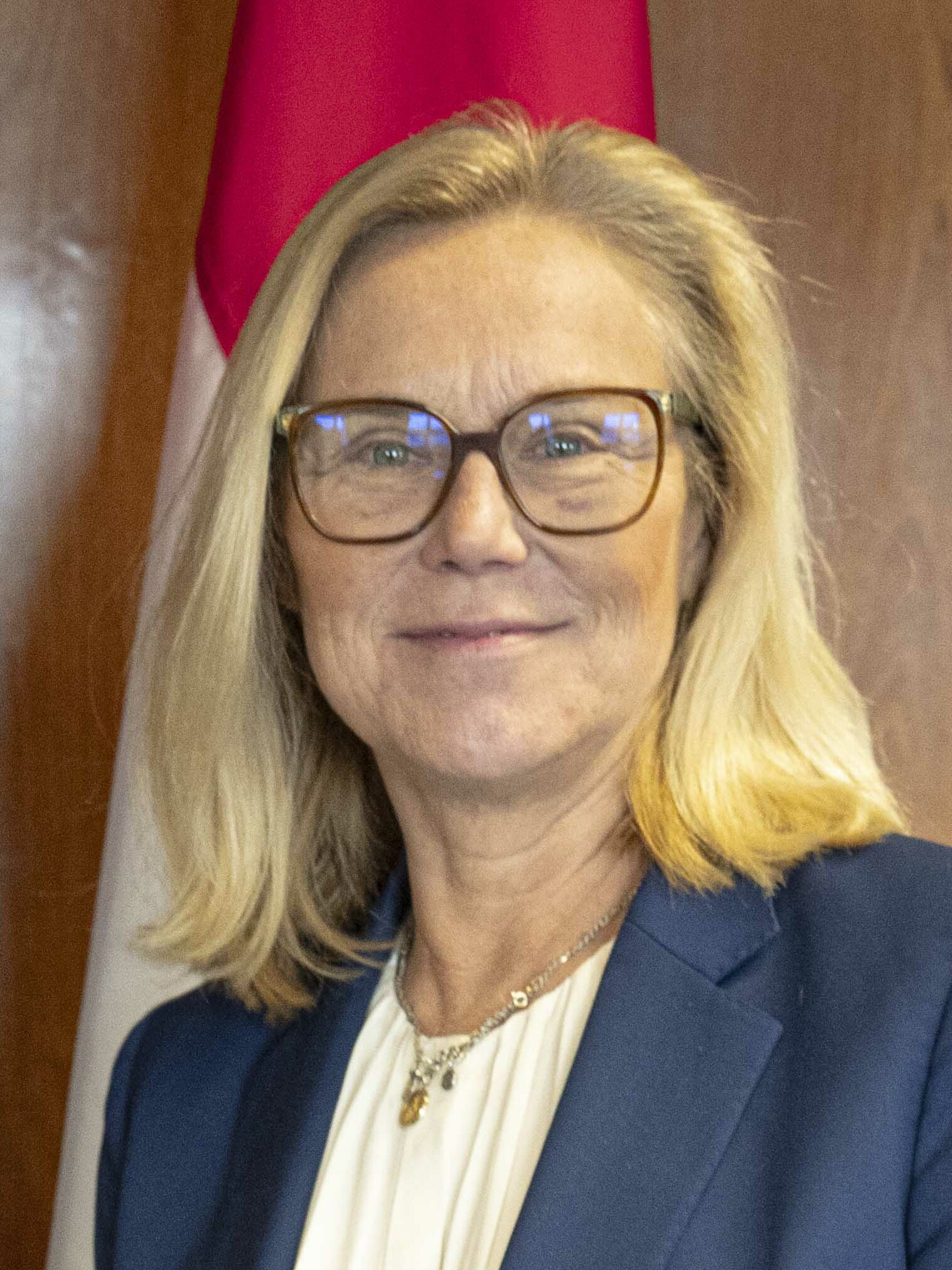
Sigrid Kaag, leader from 2020 to 2023

Since 2008, the party has performed quite well in the opinion polls, ranging from ten to 26 seats, compared to only three seats in the House of Representatives. In the 2009 European Parliament election, the party won 11% of the votes and three seats, two more than in the previous election. The news programme Nova attributed this increase to the leadership of Alexander Pechtold, who was considered "the leader of the opposition" at the time. Under the leadership of Pechtold, the party has taken strong stances against the Party for Freedom (PVV) of Geert Wilders. In the 2010 general election, D66 increased its representation to ten seats. In the 2012 general election, the party further increased its number of seats to 12. Between 2008 and 2015, the party saw a significant increase in party membership, going from 10,000 in 2008 to 25,000 in 2015.

In the 2017 general election, D66 won 19 seats in the House of Representatives and formed a centre-right coalition government with the VVD, CDA and Christian Union (CU). Kajsa Ollongren was appointed second Deputy Prime Minister in the third Rutte cabinet.

=== Kaag and Jetten leadership (2018–present) ===
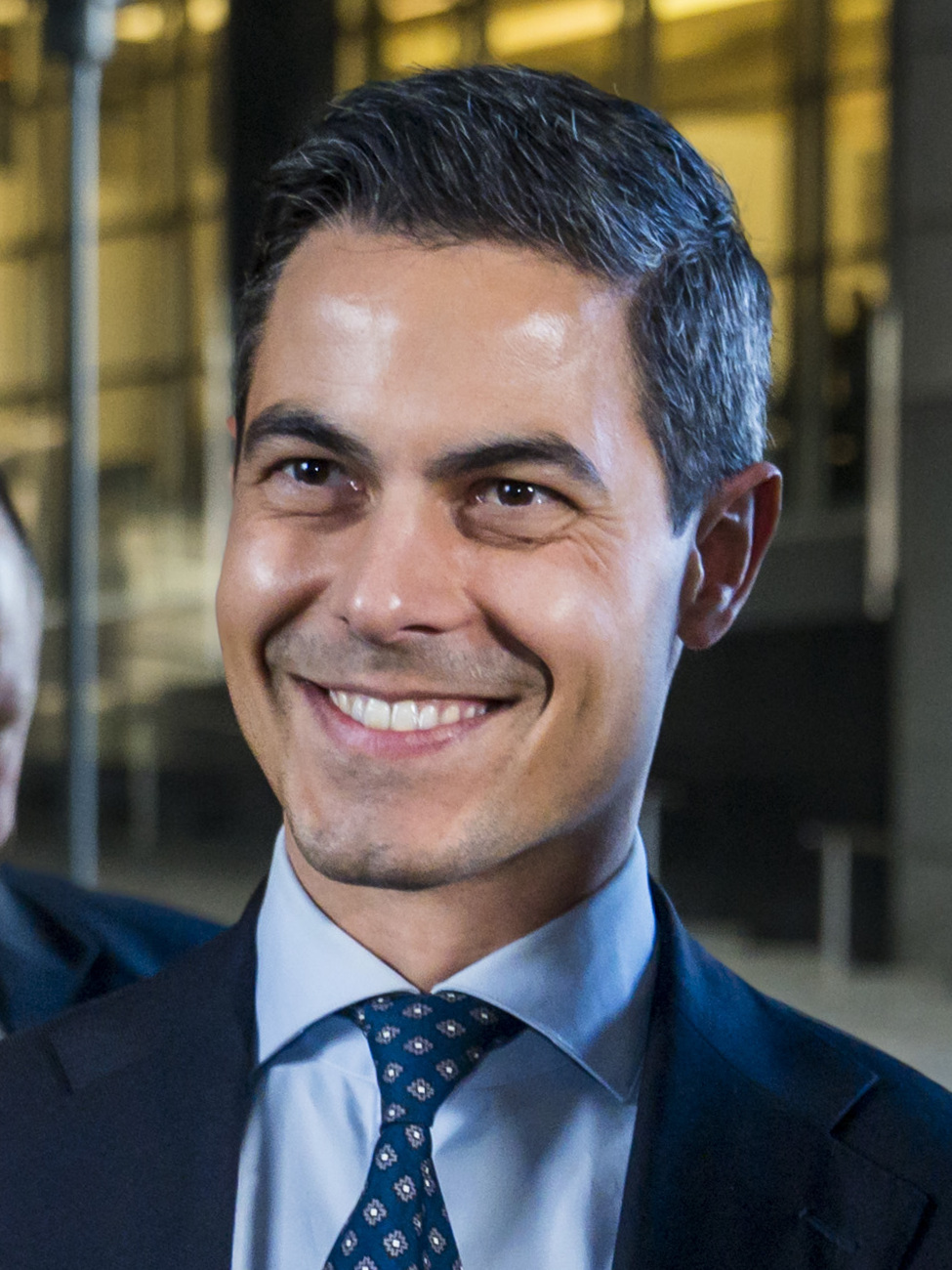
Rob Jetten, leader since 2023

In October 2018, Alexander Pechtold announced his retirement from politics. He was replaced by Rob Jetten as parliamentary leader, but the position of party leader remained vacant. In September 2020, Minister for Foreign Trade and Development Cooperation Sigrid Kaag was elected the new party leader and top candidate for the 2021 general election. Despite the fact that the opinion polls had predicted D66 to lose seats, the party won 24 seats in the 2021 election, becoming the second largest party in the House of Representatives. On 12 August 2023 Rob Jetten became the leader of the party. Following the 2023 general election D66 lost more seats than any party, being reduced from 24 to nine, their worst result in 17 years.

In the 2025 general election the party won 26 seats in the House of Representatives, reaching the highest amount of seats since the party's founding in 1966. It became the biggest party in terms of vote share, while obtaining the same amount of seats as the second biggest party, the PVV. Jetten became Prime Minister of the Netherlands on 23 February 2026, becoming the first D66 member to hold the position. The party leads the Jetten cabinet, a minority government with support from the People's Party for Freedom and Democracy and Christian Democratic Appeal. As of 1 January 2026, the party has over 35,000 members, the fourth-most in the country.

== Ideology and positions ==
D66 is a social liberal and progressive party with positions ranging from the centre to centre-left. Some of the party's most important positions include:

- a mixed economy which combining market economics and government intervention, increased flexibility in the labour market and tax cuts for the lower and middle classes.
- increasing government spending on education and innovation, for instance upscaling in teachers' salaries and supporting the education sector to be deregulated and introduce more competition in the sector.
- favouring a carbon price and more investment in sustainable energy to combat global warming. Additionally also opposing the right to hunt and sees hunting only as last resort for wildlife damage control.
- culturally liberalism with the first Kok cabinet in which it participated introducing several liberal reforms in the past, such as the legalisation of euthanasia, same-sex marriage and sex work.
- acting as a proponent of reforming democracy, favouring electoral reforms such as a binding referendum, abolition of the Senate and direct election of the prime minister and mayors.

== Electorate ==
Democrats 66 appeals to the well educated and civil servants. D66 is overall strong and concentrated in the Randstad conurbation, while also getting its votes in and around university towns. In the 2014 municipal elections, D66 became the largest party in many major cities including Amsterdam, The Hague, Utrecht, Tilburg, Groningen, Enschede, Apeldoorn, Haarlem, Amersfoort and Arnhem.

== Election results ==
=== House of Representatives ===
| Election | Lead candidate | List | Votes | % | Seats | +/– | Government |
|---|---|---|---|---|---|---|---|
| 1967 | Hans van Mierlo | List | 307,810 | 4.4 | 7 / 150 | New | Opposition |
| 1971 | Hans van Mierlo | List | 427,720 | 6.7 | 11 / 150 | ▲4 | Opposition |
| 1972 | Hans van Mierlo | List | 307,048 | 4.1 | 6 / 150 | ▼5 | Coalition |
| 1977 | Jan Terlouw | List | 452,423 | 5.4 | 8 / 150 | ▲2 | Opposition |
| 1981 | Jan Terlouw | List | 961,121 | 11.0 | 17 / 150 | ▲9 | Coalition |
| 1982 | Jan Terlouw | List | 351,278 | 4.3 | 6 / 150 | ▼11 | Opposition |
| 1986 | Hans van Mierlo | List | 562,466 | 6.1 | 9 / 150 | ▲3 | Opposition |
| 1989 | Hans van Mierlo | List | 701,934 | 7.9 | 12 / 150 | ▲3 | Opposition |
| 1994 | Hans van Mierlo | List | 1,391,202 | 15.5 | 24 / 150 | ▲12 | Coalition |
| 1998 | Els Borst | List | 773,497 | 9.0 | 14 / 150 | ▼10 | Coalition |
| 2002 | Thom de Graaf | List | 484,317 | 5.1 | 7 / 150 | ▼7 | Opposition |
| 2003 | Thom de Graaf | List | 393,333 | 4.0 | 6 / 150 | ▼1 | Coalition |
| 2006 | Alexander Pechtold | List | 193,232 | 2.0 | 3 / 150 | ▼3 | Opposition |
| 2010 | Alexander Pechtold | List | 654,167 | 6.9 | 10 / 150 | ▲7 | Opposition |
| 2012 | Alexander Pechtold | List | 757,091 | 8.0 | 12 / 150 | ▲2 | Opposition |
| 2017 | Alexander Pechtold | List | 1,285,819 | 12.2 | 19 / 150 | ▲7 | Coalition |
| 2021 | Sigrid Kaag | List | 1,565,861 | 15.0 | 24 / 150 | ▲5 | Coalition |
| 2023 | Rob Jetten | List | 656,292 | 6.3 | 9 / 150 | ▼15 | Opposition |
| 2025 | Rob Jetten | List | 1,790,634 | 16.9 | 26 / 150 | ▲17 | Coalition |

=== Senate ===
| Election | Lead candidate | List | Votes | % | Seats | +/– |
|---|---|---|---|---|---|---|
| 1971 | | | | | 6 / 75 | New |
| 1974 | | | | | 3 / 75 | ▼3 |
| 1977 | | | | | 0 / 75 | ▼3 |
| 1980 | Jan Glastra van Loon | | | | 2 / 75 | ▲2 |
| 1981 | Jan Glastra van Loon | | | | 4 / 75 | ▲2 |
| 1983 | Jan Glastra van Loon | | | | 6 / 75 | ▲2 |
| 1986 | Jan Vis | | | | 6 / 75 | |
| 1987 | Jan Vis | | | | 5 / 75 | ▼1 |
| 1991 | Jan Vis | | | | 12 / 75 | ▲7 |
| 1995 | Eddy Schuyer | List | | | 7 / 75 | ▼5 |
| 1999 | Eddy Schuyer | List | 8,542 | 5.4 | 4 / 75 | ▼3 |
| 2003 | Eddy Schuyer | List | 7,087 | 4.4 | 3 / 75 | ▼1 |
| 2007 | Gerard Schouw | List | 3,270 | 2.0 | 2 / 75 | ▼1 |
| 2011 | Roger van Boxtel | List | 12,651 | 7.6 | 5 / 75 | ▲3 |
| 2015 | Thom de Graaf | List | 21,997 | 13.0 | 10 / 75 | ▲5 |
| 2019 | Annelien Bredenoord | List | 15,154 | 8.8 | 7 / 75 | ▼3 |
| 2023 | Paul van Meenen | List | 11,144 | 6.2 | 5 / 75 | ▼2 |

=== European Parliament ===
| Election | Lead candidate | List | Votes | % | Seats | +/– | EP Group |
|---|---|---|---|---|---|---|---|
| 1979 | Aar de Goede | List | 511,967 | 9.03 | 2 / 25 | New | NI |
| 1984 | Doeke Eisma | List | 120,826 | 2.28 | 0 / 25 | ▼2 | – |
| 1989 | Jan-Willem Bertens | List | 311,990 | 5.95 | 1 / 25 | ▲1 | LDR |
| 1994 | Jan-Willem Bertens | List | 481,826 | 11.66 | 4 / 31 | ▲3 | ELDR |
| 1999 | Lousewies van der Laan | List | 205,623 | 5.80 | 2 / 31 | ▼2 | ELDR |
| 2004 | Sophie in 't Veld | List | 202,502 | 4.25 | 1 / 27 | ▼1 | ALDE |
| 2009 | Sophie in 't Veld | List | 515,422 | 11.32 | 3 / 25 | ▲2 | ALDE |
| 2009 | Sophie in 't Veld | List | 515,422 | 11.32 | 3 / 26 | 0 | ALDE |
| 2014 | Sophie in 't Veld | List | 735,825 | 15.48 | 4 / 26 | ▲1 | ALDE |
| 2019 | Sophie in 't Veld | List | 389,692 | 7.09 | 2 / 26 | ▼2 | RE |
| 2019 | Sophie in 't Veld | List | 389,692 | 7.09 | 2 / 29 | 0 | RE |
| 2024 | Gerben-Jan Gerbrandy | List | 523,650 | 8.40 | 3 / 31 | ▲1 | RE |

== Organisation ==
=== Name and logo ===
At its founding, the party was called Democrats '66 (Dutch: Democraten '66, abbreviated D'66). The name referred to the year of its foundation, which was supposed to convey a modern image. In 1985, the apostrophe was dropped: the name had become a successful political brand, but the year no longer conveyed a modern image.

Logos of the Democrats 66
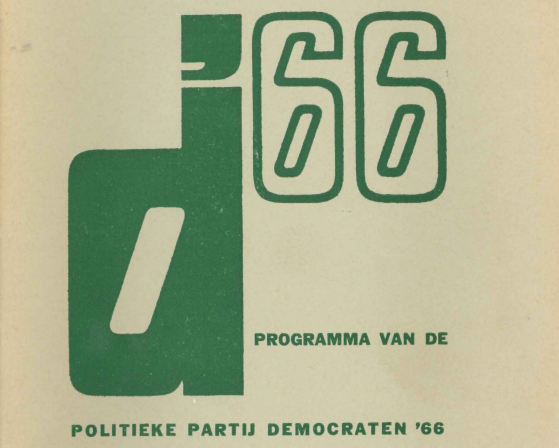
1966–1984

1985–2001

2002–2006

2006–2008

2008–2019

2019–present

=== Structure ===
The highest organ of the D66 is the General Assembly, in which every member can participate. It convenes multiple times per year. It appoints the party board and has the last say over the party program. The party list, including the party's parliamentary leader, for the Senate, House of Representatives, European Parliament candidates are elected directly by the members. The party has between 250 and 300 branches all over the Netherlands.

=== Leadership ===
The leader of the Democrats 66 is the most senior politician within the Democrats 66 (Dutch: Democraten 66, D66) party in the Netherlands. The post is currently held by Rob Jetten who was elected on 12 August 2023 and led the party into the 2023 and 2025 elections. Jetten previously served as parliamentary leader of D66 in the House of Representatives from 2018 to 2021 and as Minister for Climate and Energy in the fourth Rutte government.

The Leaders outwardly act as the 'figurehead' and the main representative of the party. Within the party, they must ensure political consensus. At election time, the leader is always the lead candidate of the party list. In the Democrats 66, the leader is often the parliamentary leader in the House of Representatives. Some Democrats 66 leaders became a minister in a cabinet.

| Leader | | Term of office | Age as leader | Position(s) | Lead candidate |
|---|---|---|---|---|---|
| Hans van Mierlo | Hans van Mierlo (1931–2010) | 14 October 1966 – 1 September 1973 (6 years, 322 days) (First term) 25 January 1986 – 15 February 1998 (12 years, 21 days) (Second term) | 35–42 (First term) 54–66 (Second term) | Member of the House of Representatives (1967–1977, 1986–1994, 1998); Parliamentary leader in the House of Representatives (1967–1973, 1986–1994); Minister of Defence (1981–1982); Member of the Senate (1983–1986); Minister of Foreign Affairs (1994–1998); Deputy Prime Minister (1994–1998); Minister of State (1998–2010) (Title of honor) | 1967; 1971; 1972; 1986; 1989; 1994 |
| Jan Terlouw | Jan Terlouw (1931–2025) | 1 September 1973 – 8 September 1982 (9 years, 7 days) | 41–50 | Member of the Municipal council of Utrecht (1970–1971); Member of the House of Representatives (1971–1981); Parliamentary leader in the House of Representatives (1973–1981); Minister of Economic Affairs (1981–1982); Deputy Prime Minister (1981–1982); Secretary-General of the ECMT (1983–1991); Queen's commissioner of Gelderland (1991–1996); Member of the Senate (1999–2003) | 1977; 1981; 1982 |
| Laurens Jan Brinkhorst | Laurens Jan; Brinkhorst (born 1937) | 8 September 1982 – 11 November 1982 (64 days) | 45–45 | Member of the Provincial council of Groningen (1970–1971); State Secretary for Foreign Affairs (1973–1977); Member of the House of Representatives (1977–1982)); Parliamentary leader in the House of Representatives (1981–1982); Ambassador of the EU to Japan (1982–1987); Director-General for Health and Consumers (1987–1994); Member of the European Parliament (1994–1999); Minister of Agriculture, Nature and Fisheries (1999–2002); Minister of Economic Affairs (2003–2006); Deputy Prime Minister (2005–2006) | |
| Maarten Engwirda | Maarten; Engwirda (born 1943) | 11 November 1982 – 25 January 1986 (3 years, 75 days) | 39–42 | Member of the House of Representatives (1971–1972, 1977–1989); Member of the European Parliament (1971–1973); Parliamentary leader in the House of Representatives (1982–1986); Member of the Court of Audit (1990–1996); Member of the European Court of Auditors (1996–2011) | |
Hans van Mierlo (25 January 1986 – 15 February 1998)
| Els Borst | Els Borst (1932–2014) | 15 February 1998 – 30 May 1998 (104 days) | 65–66 | Vice Chair of the Health Council (1986–1994); Minister of Health, Welfare and Sport (1994–2002); Member of the House of Representatives (1998); Parliamentary leader in the House of Representatives (1998); Deputy Prime Minister (1998–2002); Minister of State (2012–2014) (Title of honor) | 1998 |
| Thom de Graaf | Thom de Graaf (born 1957) | 30 May 1998 – 22 January 2003 (4 years, 237 days) | 40–45 | Member of the House of Representatives (1994–2003); Parliamentary leader in the House of Representatives (1997–1998, 1998–2003); Minister without Portfolio (2003–2005); Deputy Prime Minister (2003–2005); Mayor of Nijmegen (2007–2012); Member of the Senate (2011–2018); Parliamentary leader in the Senate (2015–2018); Vice-President of the Council of State (since 2018) | 2002; 2003 |
| Boris Dittrich | Boris Dittrich (born 1955) | 22 January 2003 – 3 February 2006 (3 years, 12 days) | 47–50 | Member of the House of Representatives (1994–2006); Parliamentary leader in the House of Representatives (2003–2006); Member of the Senate (since 2019) | |
^{[Vacant]} (3 February 2006 – 14 June 2006)
| Alexander Pechtold | Alexander; Pechtold (born 1965) | 24 June 2006 – 10 October 2018 (12 years, 108 days) | 40–52 | Member of the Municipal council of Leiden (1994–2002); Alderman of Leiden (1997–2003); Mayor of Wageningen (2003–2005); Minister without Portfolio (2005–2006); Member of the House of Representatives (2006–2018); Parliamentary leader in the House of Representatives (2006–2018); Mayor of Delft (since 2025) | 2006; 2010; 2012; 2017 |
^{[Vacant]} (10 October 2018 – 4 September 2020)
| Sigrid Kaag | Sigrid Kaag (born 1961) | 4 September 2020 – 12 August 2023 (2 years, 342 days) | 58–61 | U.N. Special Coordinator for Syria (2013–2014); U.N. Special Coordinator for Lebanon (2015–2017); Minister for Foreign Trade and Development Cooperation (2017–2021); Minister of Foreign Affairs (2018, 2021); Member of the House of Representatives (2021–2022); Parliamentary leader in the House of Representatives (2021, 2021–2022); Minister of Finance (2022–2024); Deputy Prime Minister (2022–2024); U.N. Senior Humanitarian and Reconstruction Coordinator for Gaza (since 2024); U.N. Special Coordinator for the Middle East Peace Process (since 2025) | 2021 |
| Rob Jetten | Rob Jetten (born 1987) | 12 August 2023 – Incumbent (3 years, 29 days) | 36–39 | Member of the Municipal council of Nijmegen (2010–2017); Member of the House of Representatives (2017–2022, 2023–2026); Parliamentary leader in the House of Representatives (2018–2021, 2021, 2023–2026); Minister without Portfolio (2022–2024); Minister of Finance (2024); Deputy Prime Minister (2024); Prime Minister (since 2026) | 2023; 2025 |

^{Lousewies van der Laan served as Parliamentary leader in the House of Representatives but didn't serve as Party Leader. Alexander Pechtold was elected as lead candidate for the 2006 general election on 24 June 2006 following the 2006 leadership election.}
^{Rob Jetten served as Parliamentary leader in the House of Representatives but didn't serve as Party Leader. Sigrid Kaag was elected as lead candidate for the 2021 general election on 4 September 2020.}

==== Chairpersons ====
- Hans van Mierlo (14 September 1966 – 16 February 1967)
- Gerben Ringnalda (16 February 1967 – 18 November 1967)
- Hans van Lookeren Campagne (18 November 1967 – 14 December 1968)
- Jan Beekmans (14 December 1968 – 7 November 1971)
- Ruby van der Scheer (7 November 1971 – 11 March 1973)
- Jan ten Brink (11 March 1973 – 6 November 1976)
- Jan Glastra van Loon (6 November 1976 – 27 October 1979)
- Henk Zeevalking (27 October 1979 – 11 September 1981)
- Cees Spigt (Ad interim) (11 September 1981 – 14 November 1981)
- Jan van Berkom (14 November 1981 – 30 October 1982)
- Jacob Kohnstamm (30 October 1982 – 20 May 1986)
- Olga Scheltema (Ad interim) (20 May 1986 – 1 November 1986)
- Saskia van der Loo (1 November 1986 – 29 October 1988)
- Michel Jager (29 October 1988 – 3 November 1990)
- Ries Jansen (3 November 1990 – 28 November 1992)
- Wim Vrijhoef (28 November 1992 – 23 November 1996)
- Tom Kok (23 November 1996 – 20 November 1999)
- Gerard Schouw (20 November 1999 – 16 November 2002)
- Alexander Pechtold (16 November 2002 – 31 March 2005)
- Jan Hoekema (Ad interim) (31 March 2005 – 21 May 2005)
- Frank Dales (21 May 2005 – 2 March 2007)
- Gerard Schouw (Ad interim) (2 March 2007 – 12 May 2007)
- Ingrid van Engelshoven (12 May 2007 – 9 March 2013)
- Fleur Gräper (9 March 2013 – 13 September 2015)
- Letty Demmers (13 September 2015 – 6 October 2018)
- Anne-Marie Spierings (6 October 2018 – 13 November 2021)
- Victor Everhardt (13 November 2021 – 23 November 2024)
- Alexandra van Huffelen (23 November 2024 – present)

==== Parliamentary leaders ====
- Parliamentary leaders in the House of Representatives
  - Hans van Mierlo (23 February 1967 – 1 September 1973)
  - Jan Terlouw (1 September 1973 – 11 September 1981)
  - Laurens Jan Brinkhorst (11 September 1981 – 10 November 1982)
  - Maarten Engwirda (10 November 1982 – 3 June 1986)
  - Hans van Mierlo (3 June 1986 – 22 August 1994)
  - Gerrit Jan Wolffensperger (22 August 1994 – 21 November 1997)
  - Thom de Graaf (21 November 1997 – 19 May 1998)
  - Els Borst (19 May 1998 – 30 May 1998)
  - Thom de Graaf (30 May 1998 – 22 January 2003)
  - Boris Dittrich (22 January 2003 – 3 February 2006)
  - Lousewies van der Laan (3 February 2006 – 30 November 2006)
  - Alexander Pechtold (30 November 2006 – 9 October 2018)
  - Rob Jetten (9 October 2018 – 18 March 2021)
  - Sigrid Kaag (18 March 2021 – 25 May 2021)
  - Rob Jetten (25 May 2021 – 28 September 2021)
  - Sigrid Kaag (28 September 2021 – 10 January 2022)
  - Jan Paternotte (11 January 2022 – 22 November 2023)
  - Rob Jetten (23 November 2023 – 9 Februari 2026)
  - Jan Paternotte (10 February 2026 – present)
- Parliamentary leaders in the Senate
  - Bert Schwarz (11 May 1971 – 17 September 1973)
  - Paula Wassen-van Schaveren (17 September 1973 – 17 September 1974)
  - Doeke Eisma (17 September 1974 – 20 September 1977)
  - Jan Glastra van Loon (16 September 1980 – 3 December 1985)
  - Jan Vis (3 December 1985 – 1 March 1995)
  - Eddy Schuyer (1 March 1995 – 12 June 2007)
  - Gerard Schouw (12 June 2007 – 17 June 2010)
  - Hans Engels (22 June 2010 – 7 June 2011)
  - Roger van Boxtel (7 June 2011 – 9 June 2015)
  - Thom de Graaf (9 June 2015 – 26 June 2018)
  - Hans Engels (26 June 2018 – 11 June 2019)
  - Annelien Bredenoord (11 June 2019 – 12 June 2023)
  - Paul van Meenen (13 June 2023 – present)

=== Linked organisations ===
The youth wing of D66 is called the Young Democrats (Dutch: Jonge Democraten, abbreviated JD). It has produced several prominent active members of D66, such as former MP Boris van der Ham. The JD is a member of European Liberal Youth and the International Federation of Liberal Youth.

D66 is a co-founder of the Netherlands Institute for Multiparty Democracy, a democracy assistance organisation of seven Dutch political parties. The Hans van Mierlo Foundation is the party's policy institute.

=== International affiliation ===
D66 is a member of the Liberal International and of the Alliance of Liberals and Democrats for Europe (ALDE). D66 joined the Liberal and Democratic Reformists (LDR) group in 1989. It became a full member of the European Liberal Democrat and Reform Party (ELDR) in 1994 and a full member of the Liberal International in 1986.

==== European Parliament ====
The D66 delegation is part of the Renew Europe group in the European Parliament. Prior to the first European elections in 1979, D66's appointed MEPs were part of the Socialist Group, before switching to Non-Inscrits from 1979 to 1984, and the LDR/ELDR/ALDE group since 1989.

Current members of the European Parliament since the 2024 European Parliament election:

- Gerben-Jan Gerbrandy, delegation leader
- Raquel Garcia Hermida-van der Walle
- Brigitte van den Berg

==== Committee of the Regions ====
In the European Committee of the Regions, the Democrats 66 party sits in the Renew Europe CoR group, with one full and one alternate member for the 2025–2030 mandate:

- Ellen van Selm (member)
- Jack van der Hoek (alternate)

=== Water board ===
D66 does not run an independent list for the water board elections. Instead, like GroenLinks and Volt Netherlands, it recommends that its voters support Water Natuurlijk, an independent, green-oriented political party focused solely on water board elections.

== See also ==
- Liberal democracy
- Liberalism in the Netherlands
- Water Natuurlijk
