= Gerard Schouw =

Dutch politician

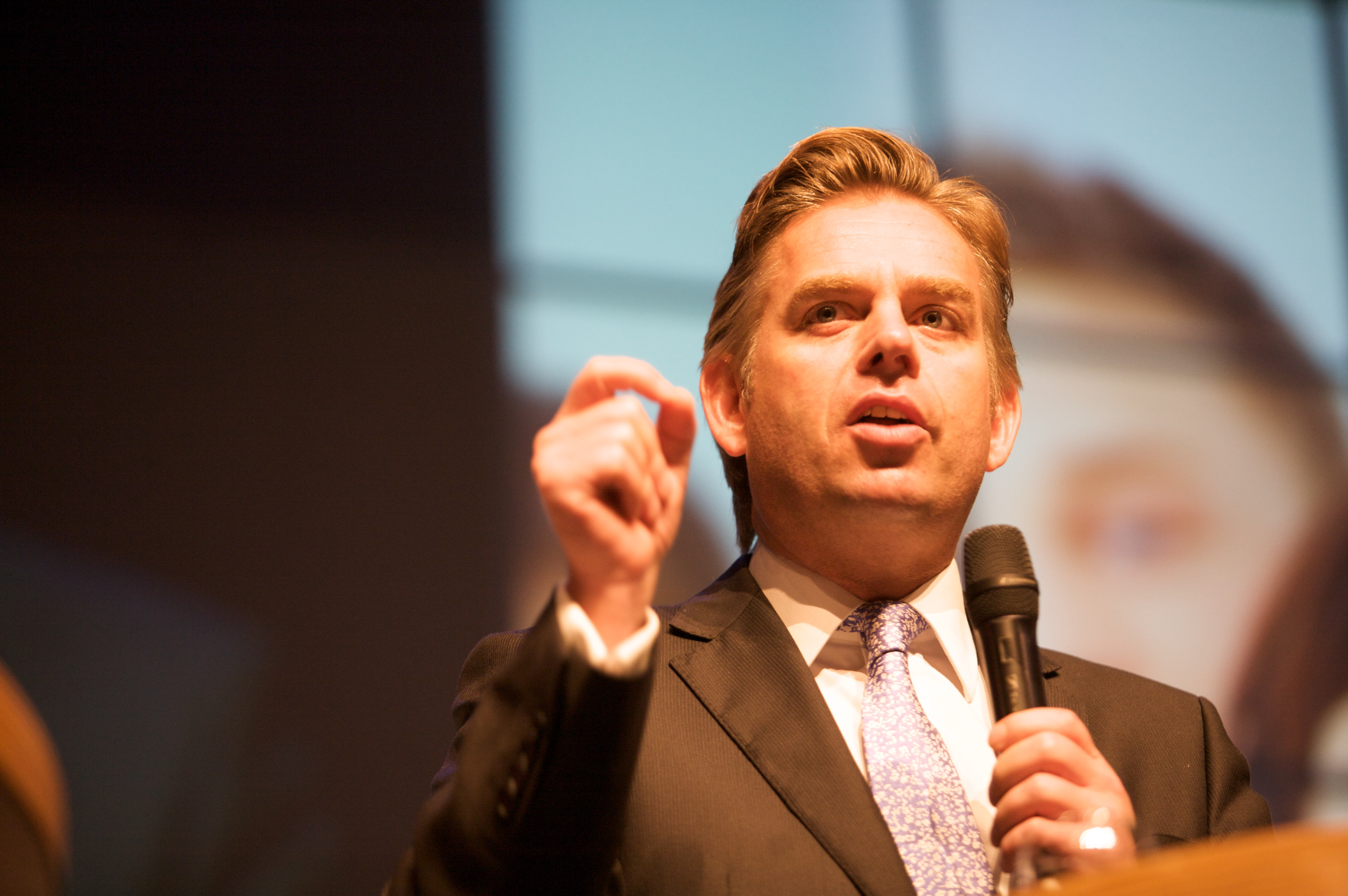
- Gerard Schouw

Member of the House of Representatives
- In office 17 June 2010 – 31 July 2015

Personal details
- Born: 30 December 1965 (age 60) Monster, South Holland
- Party: Democrats 66
- Occupation: Politician

Adrianus Gerardus (Gerard) Schouw (born 30 December 1965 in Monster, South Holland) is a Dutch corporate director and former politician. As a member of Democrats 66 (D66) he was an MP from 17 June 2010 until 31 July 2015. He focused on matters of the European Union, democracy, judiciary and the right of asylum. He has been replaced by Fatma Koşer Kaya. Since 1 August 2015 he has been CEO of Nefarma.

== Biography ==
Schouw studied administration of business at Hogeschool Delft, public administration at VU University Amsterdam and obtained a Ph.D. in law from Leiden University.

From 1990 to 1998 he was a member of the municipal council of Dordrecht and from 1994 to 1998 an alderman of Dordrecht. From 1999 to 2002 he was D66 chairman. From 2003 to 2010 he was a member of the Senate as well as from 2007 to 2010 Senate group leader. From June 2010 till July 2015 he was a member of the House of Representatives. In 2012, he was a candidate to become Speaker of the House of Representatives. He competed against Anouchka van Miltenburg and Khadija Arib, ultimately losing to van Miltenburg.

Besides his political activities Schouw was director of the Dutch knowledge centre for big cities (Kenniscentrum Grote Steden) from 2001 to 2007. Since 2007 he has been president of the board of directors of the Netherlands Institute for City Innovation Studies (Nicis Institute).

Since August 2015 he has been CEO of Nefarma, the trade association for those pharmaceutical industries in the Netherlands, which develop innovative pharmaceutical drugs.

== Electoral history ==
Electoral history of Gerard Schouw
Year	Body	Party	Pos.	Votes	Result		Ref.
Year	Body	Party	Pos.	Votes	Party seats	Individual	Ref.
2021	House of Representatives	Democrats 66	72 (Note: Only participated as lijstduwer in the electoral district Dordrecht.)	54	24	Lost	
