= Maarten Engwirda =

Dutch politician

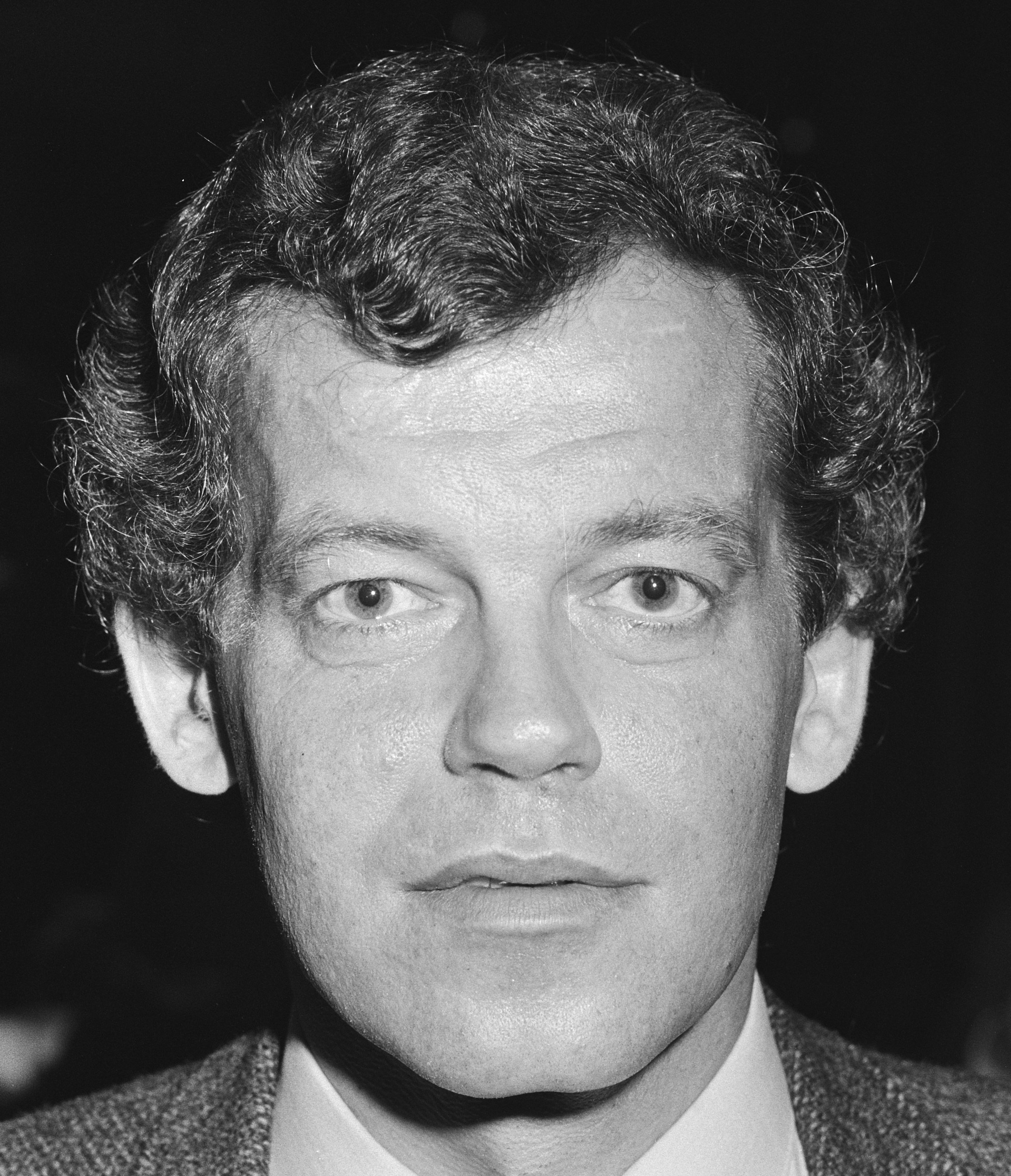
- Maarten Engwirda in 1982

Member of the European Court of Auditors
- In office 1 January 1996 – 1 January 2011

Member of the Court of Audit
- In office 1 October 1990 – 1 January 1996

Parliamentary leader in the House of Representatives
- In office 10 November 1982 – 3 June 1986
- Preceded by: Laurens Jan Brinkhorst
- Succeeded by: Hans van Mierlo
- Parliamentary group: Democrats 66

Leader of the Democrats 66
- In office 10 November 1982 – 25 January 1986
- Preceded by: Laurens Jan Brinkhorst
- Succeeded by: Hans van Mierlo

Member of the European Parliament
- In office 22 September 1971 – 12 March 1973
- Parliamentary group: Liberals and Allies Group
- Constituency: Netherlands

Member of the House of Representatives
- In office 8 June 1977 – 14 September 1989
- In office 11 May 1971 – 7 December 1972

Personal details
- Born: Maarten Boudewijn Engwirda; 2 June 1943 (age 83) Tilburg, Netherlands
- Party: Democrats 66 (from 1966)
- Education: University of Groningen (Bachelor of Laws, Master of Arts)
- Occupation: Politician · civil servant · economist

Maarten Boudewijn Engwirda (born 2 June 1943) is a retired Dutch politician of the Democrats 66 (D66) party.

== Decorations ==
Honours
Ribbon bar	Honour	Country	Date	Comment
	Knight of the Order of the Netherlands Lion	Netherlands	30 April 1988	
	Commander of the Order of Orange-Nassau	Netherlands	8 December 2010	

Party political offices
Preceded by Laurens Jan Brinkhorst	Leader of the Democrats 66; 1982–1986	Succeeded by Hans van Mierlo
Preceded by Laurens Jan Brinkhorst	Parliamentary leader of the Democrats 66 in the House of Representatives; 1982–1986	Succeeded by Hans van Mierlo
