= 1979 European Parliament election in the Netherlands =

- 7 June 1979

25 seats to the European Parliament
- Turnout: 58.12%
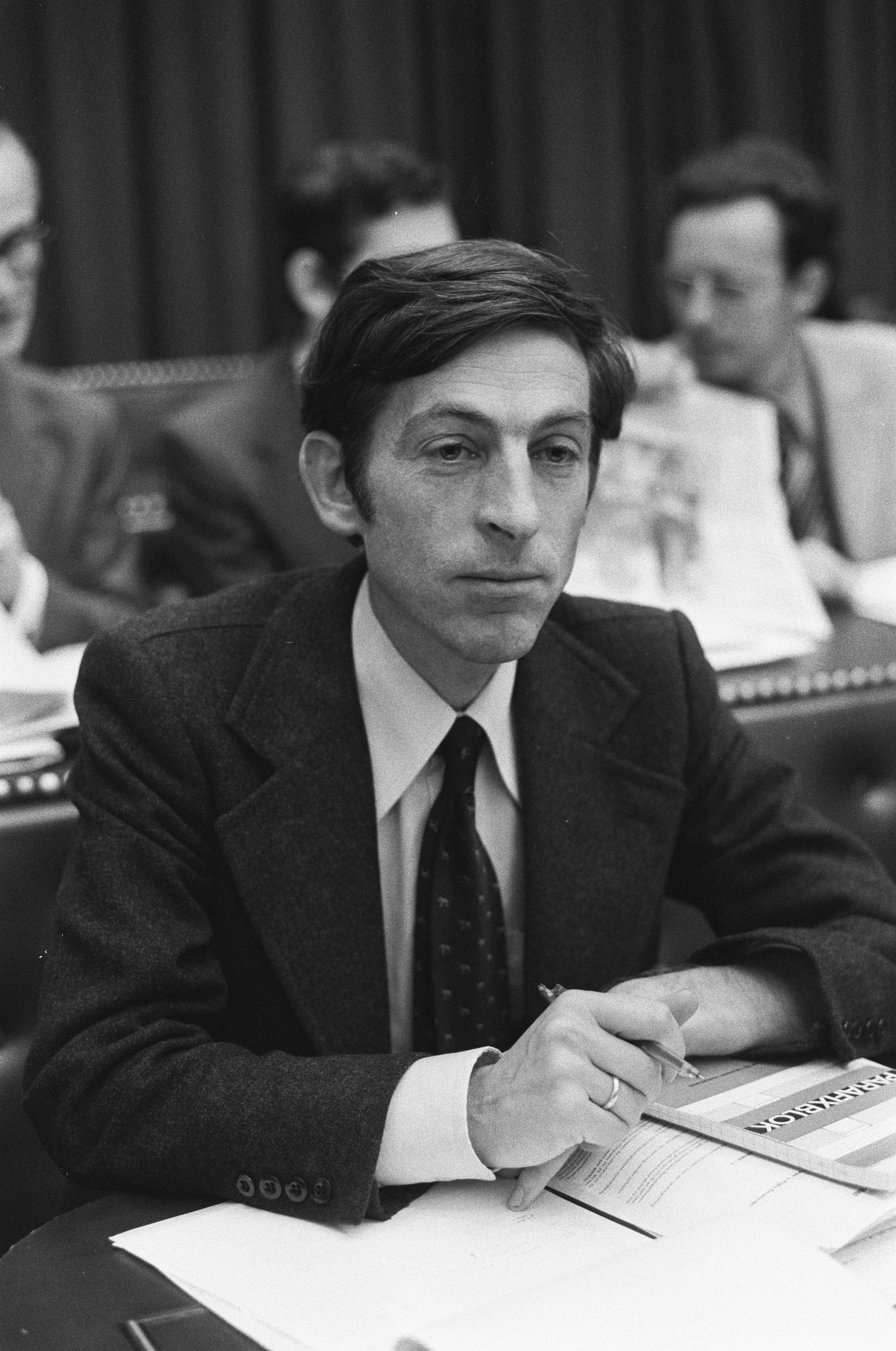

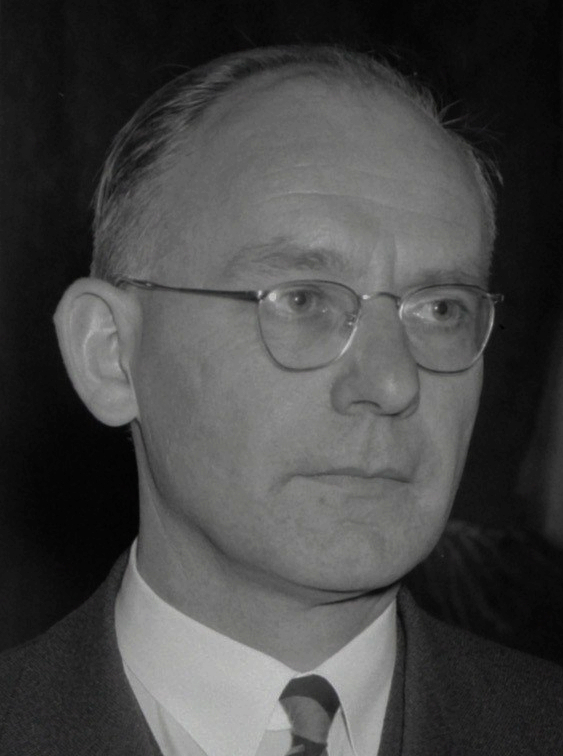

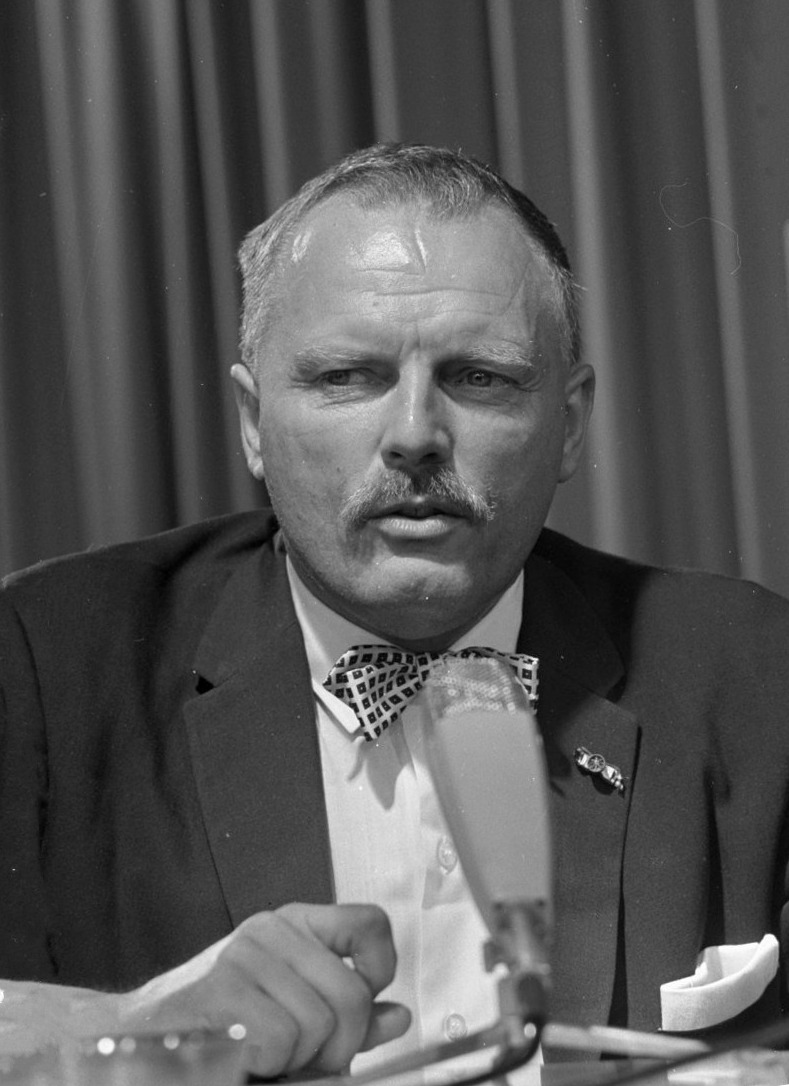

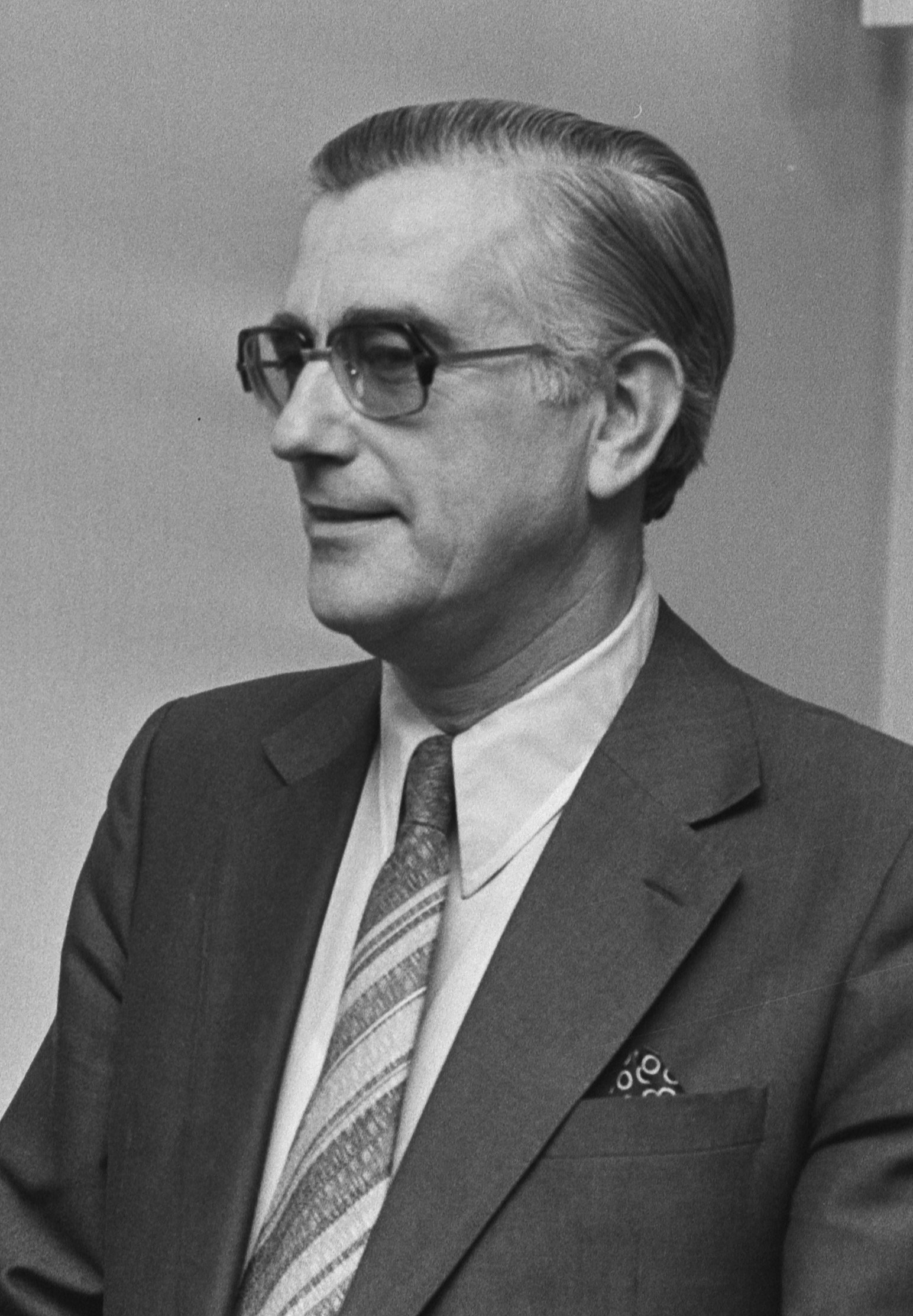
| | First party | Second party |
|---|---|---|
| Leader | Bouke Beumer | Anne Vondeling |
| Party | CDA | PvdA |
| Alliance | EPP | SOC |
| Seats won | 10 / 25 | 9 / 25 |
| Popular vote | 2,017,743 | 1,722,240 |
| Percentage | 35.60% | 30.39% |
| | Third party | Fourth party |
| Leader | Cees Berkhouwer | Aar de Goede |
| Party | VVD | D66 |
| Alliance | LD |
| Seats won | 4 / 25 | 2 / 25 |
| Popular vote | 914,787 | 511,967 |
| Percentage | 16.14% | 9.03% |

An election for Members of the European Parliament representing Netherlands constituency for the 1979–1984 term of the European Parliament was held on 7 June 1979. It was part of the wider 1979 European election.

== Electorate system ==
The ten seats were elected using proportional representation, with seats allocated using the D'Hondt method.

Voting rights were given to all citizens who were allowed to vote in Dutch parliament elections, Dutch citizens resident in other member states and did not already have voting rights for the Dutch Parliament elections and citizens of other member states who lived in the Netherlands, provided their home country granted similar rights.

== Campaign ==
The Labour Party and Political Party of Radicals formed an electoral alliance.

== Results ==
=== Dutch political parties ===
Four parties were able to win seats: the conservative liberal VVD, the progressive liberal D66, the Christian-democratic CDA and the social-democratic Labour Party. Five other nationally represented parties compete but are unable to win seats. 58.12% of the Dutch population turned out on election day.

| Party | Votes | % | Seats |
|---|---|---|---|
| Christian Democratic Appeal | 2,017,743 | 35.60 | 10 |
| Labour Party | 1,722,240 | 30.39 | 9 |
| People's Party for Freedom and Democracy | 914,787 | 16.14 | 4 |
| Democrats 66 | 511,967 | 9.03 | 2 |
| Reformed Political Party | 126,412 | 2.23 | 0 |
| Communist Party of the Netherlands | 97,343 | 1.72 | 0 |
| Pacifist Socialist Party | 97,243 | 1.72 | 0 |
| Political Party of Radicals | 92,055 | 1.62 | 0 |
| Reformed Political League | 62,610 | 1.10 | 0 |
| Leschot List | 24,903 | 0.44 | 0 |
| Total | 5,667,303 | 100.00 | 25 |
| Valid votes | 5,667,303 | 99.42 | |
| Invalid/blank votes | 33,300 | 0.58 | |
| Total votes | 5,700,603 | 100.00 | |
| Registered voters/turnout | 9,808,176 | 58.12 | |
Source: Kiesraad

=== European groups ===
Summary of the 7 June 1979 European Parliament elections in the Netherlands
1979
| European group | | Seats 1979 |
| European People's Party | EPP | 10 |
| Confederation of Socialist Parties | SOC | 9 |
| European Liberal Democrats | LD | 4 |
| Non-Inscrits | NI | 2 |
| | | 25 |
