= Doeke Eisma =

Dutch politician and sociologist

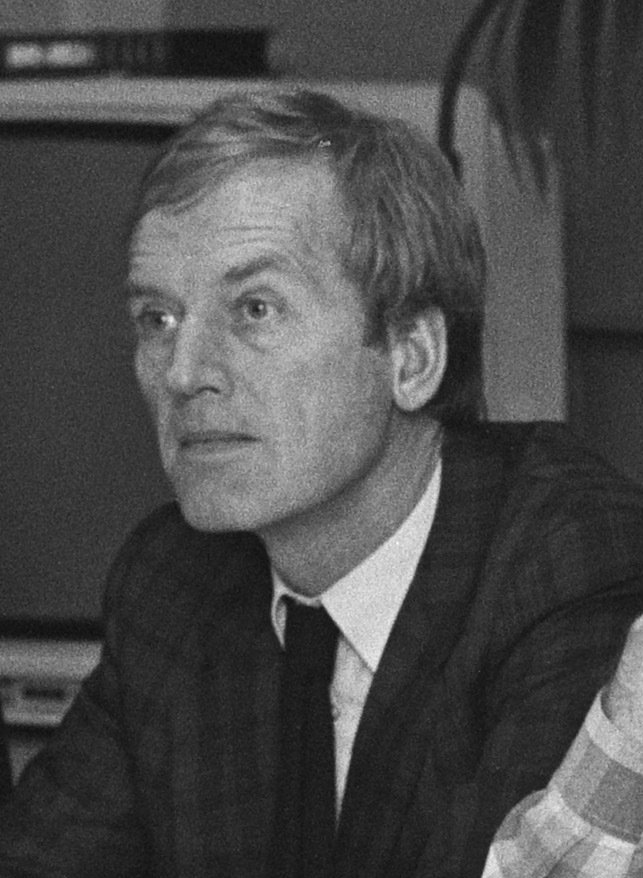

Member of the Senate
- In office 11 May 1971 – 20 September 1977

Member of the European Parliament
- In office 19 June 1981 – 23 July 1984
- In office 13 March 1973 – 2 October 1974

Member of the House of Representatives
- In office 3 June 1986 – 17 May 1994

Personal details
- Born: December 30, 1939 Hague, Netherlands
- Died: December 29, 2023 (aged 83) Hague, Netherlands
- Party: D66
- Education: University of Utrecht
- Occupation: Politician, sociologist
- Awards: Order of the Netherlands Lion

Doeke Eisma (December 30, 1939 in The Hague – December 29, 2023) was a Dutch politician and sociologist, who served as a Member of the European Parliament and a national parliamentarian.

== Biography ==
He studied sociology at the University of Utrecht. In 1968, he joined Democrats 66. From June 1970 to June 1971, he was a councilor in the province of Gelderland.

From 1971 to 1977, he was a member of the Senate, the upper house of the States General of the Netherlands, from 1974 as the chairman of his party's faction.

From 1973 to 1974, he served as a member of the European Parliament. Later, he was employed in the public administration.

From 1981 to 1984, he was again a member of the European Parliament, and then a senior official at the Ministry of Social Welfare, Health, and Culture.

From 1986 to 1994, he held a seat in the House of Representatives, and then, until 1999, he again served as a member of the European Parliament.

From 1999 to 2005, he was involved in lobbying activities in Brussels, focusing on environmental protection, and in 2006, he became the CEO of the GLOBE Europe institute.

He was awarded the Order of the Netherlands Lion (1991).
