= Jan Vis =

Dutch journalist, legal scholar, and politician

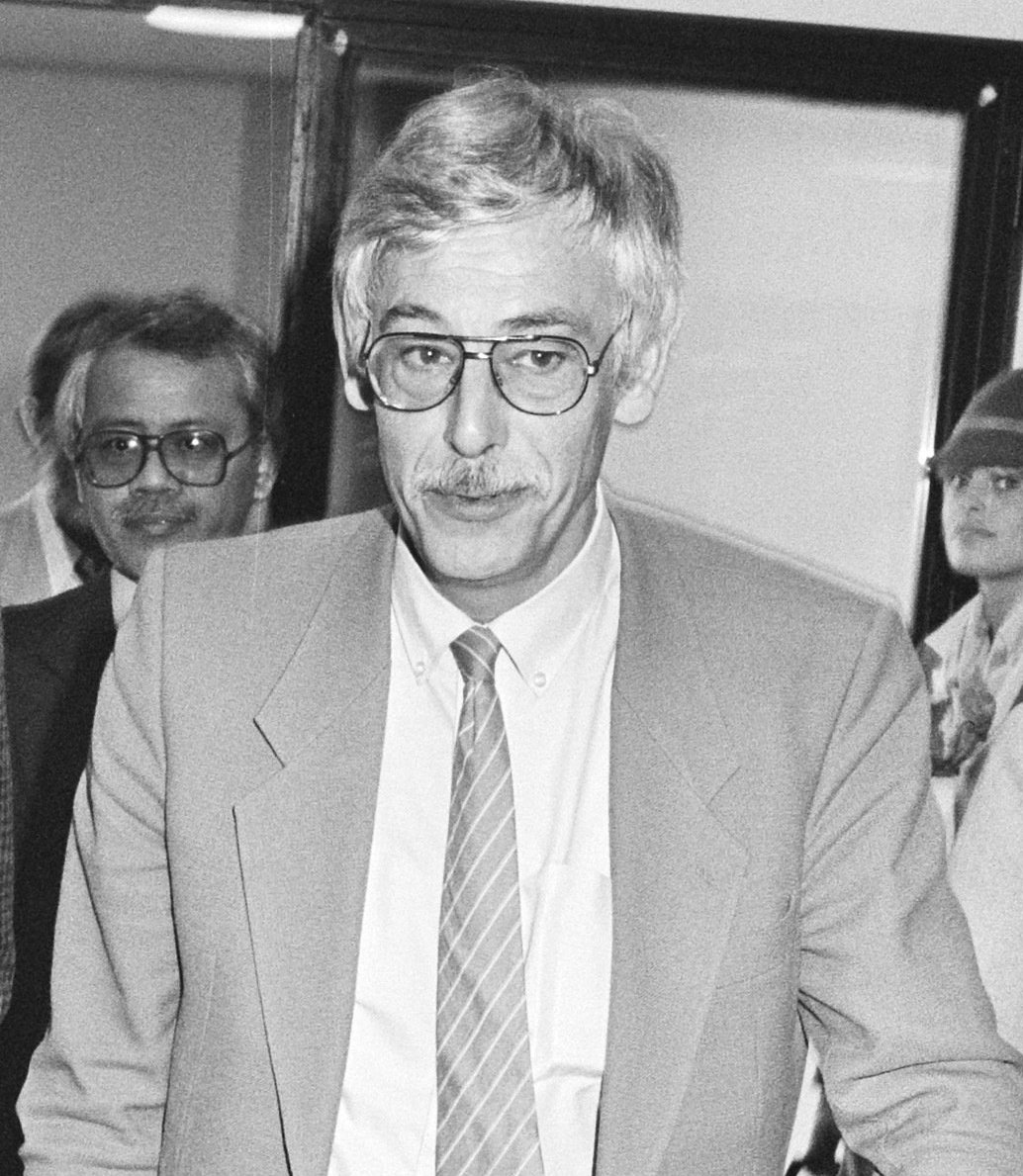
Jan Vis (1984)

Jacob Jan Vis (30 October 1933, in Wormerveer – 24 January 2011) was a former Dutch journalist, legal scholar, and politician.
