= List of members of the House of Representatives of the Netherlands, 2002–2003 =

Between 23 May 2002 and 29 January 2003, 173 representatives filled the 150 seats of the House of Representatives, the lower house of the States-General of the Netherlands. Frans Weisglas was elected Speaker of the House of Representatives for this period.

The members were elected at the general election of 15 May 2002. After the election, the First Balkenende cabinet was formed for this term, consisting of Christian Democratic Appeal (CDA, 43 seats), Pim Fortuyn List (LPF, 26 seats) and People's Party for Freedom and Democracy (VVD, 24 seats). The opposition consisted of Labour Party (PvdA, 23 seats), GroenLinks (GL, 10 seats), Socialist Party (SP, 9 seats), Democrats 66 (D66, 7 seats), Christian Union (CU, 4 seats), Reformed Political Party (SGP, 2 seats) and Livable Netherlands (LN, 2 seats). LPF lost a seat during the term, when Harry Wijnschenk left and continued as an independent. Replacements were supplied from their party lists, so the resignation of individual members did not change the balance of power in the House of Representatives.

Pim Fortuyn was murdered shortly before the election, but remained on the list. Nancy Dankers and Cecilia van Weel-Niesten (both CDA), Margo Vliegenthart and Jan Pronk (both PvdA), Roger van Boxtel (D66), André Peperkoorn and Leon Geurts (both LPF) were all elected directly, but declined their appointment.

== Members ==
Members of the House of Representatives of the Netherlands, 2002–2003
Name	Parliamentary group	Assumed office	Term end	Ref.
Jozias van Aartsen	VVD	23 May 2002	29 January 2003	
Ine Aasted-Madsen	CDA	23 May 2002	29 January 2003	
Karin Adelmund	PvdA	23 May 2002	29 January 2003	
Nebahat Albayrak	PvdA	23 May 2002	29 January 2003	
Ton Alblas	LPF	23 May 2002	29 January 2003	
Rendert Algra	CDA	26 July 2002	29 January 2003	
Agnes van Ardenne-van der Hoeven	CDA	23 May 2002	21 July 2002	
Khadija Arib	PvdA	23 May 2002	29 January 2003	
Gerard van As	LPF	23 May 2002	29 January 2003	
Joop Atsma	CDA	23 May 2002	29 January 2003	
Naïma Azough	GL	23 May 2002	29 January 2003	
Bert Bakker	D66	23 May 2002	29 January 2003	
Jan Peter Balkenende	CDA	23 May 2002	21 July 2002	
Willibrord van Beek	VVD	23 May 2002	29 January 2003	
Dick Benschop	PvdA	23 May 2002	31 August 2002 (Note: Left for political reasons)	
Philomena Bijlhout	LPF	23 May 2002	21 July 2002	
Jan Dirk Blaauw	VVD	26 July 2002	29 January 2003	
Anke van Blerck-Woerdman	VVD	23 May 2002	29 January 2003	
Stef Blok	VVD	3 September 2002	29 January 2003	
Bas Jan van Bochove	CDA	23 May 2002	29 January 2003	
Harry van Bommel	SP	23 May 2002	29 January 2003	
Vic Bonke	LPF	23 May 2002	29 January 2003	
Wouter Bos	PvdA	23 May 2002	29 January 2003	
Arie van den Brand	GL	23 May 2002	29 January 2003	
Wien van den Brink	LPF	23 May 2002	29 January 2003	
Hubert Bruls	CDA	23 May 2002	29 January 2003	
Siem Buijs	CDA	23 May 2002	29 January 2003	
Jet Bussemaker	PvdA	23 May 2002	29 January 2003	
Wim van de Camp	CDA	23 May 2002	29 January 2003	
Clemens Cornielje	VVD	23 May 2002	29 January 2003	
Coskun Çörüz	CDA	23 May 2002	29 January 2003	
Ferd Crone	PvdA	23 May 2002	29 January 2003	
Fred Dekker	LPF	23 May 2002	29 January 2003	
Jan Jacob van Dijk	CDA	26 July 2002	29 January 2003	
Leen van Dijke	CU	23 May 2002	29 January 2003	
Sharon Dijksma	PvdA	23 May 2002	29 January 2003	
Hans Dijkstal	VVD	23 May 2002	31 August 2002	
Jeroen Dijsselbloem	PvdA	20 November 2002	29 January 2003	
Boris Dittrich	D66	23 May 2002	29 January 2003	
Theo van den Doel	VVD	4 September 2002	29 January 2003	
Adri Duivesteijn	PvdA	23 May 2002	29 January 2003	
Wijnand Duyvendak	GL	23 May 2002	29 January 2003	
Cor Eberhard	LPF	23 May 2002	29 January 2003	
Joost Eerdmans	LPF	23 May 2002	29 January 2003	
Nihat Eski	CDA	26 July 2002	29 January 2003	
Camiel Eurlings	CDA	23 May 2002	29 January 2003	
Kathleen Ferrier	CDA	23 May 2002	29 January 2003	
Wim van Fessem	CDA	26 July 2002	29 January 2003	
Pieter van Geel	CDA	23 May 2002	21 July 2002	
Vivien van Geen	D66	23 May 2002	29 January 2003	
Jan Geluk	VVD	16 October 2002	29 January 2003	
Ineke van Gent	GL	23 May 2002	29 January 2003	
Arda Gerkens	SP	23 May 2002	29 January 2003	
Francine Giskes	D66	23 May 2002	29 January 2003	
Theo de Graaf	LPF	23 May 2002	29 January 2003	
Thom de Graaf	D66	23 May 2002	29 January 2003	
Frank de Grave	VVD	23 May 2002	29 January 2003	
Egbert Jan Groenink	LPF	4 June 2002	29 January 2003	
Henk de Haan	CDA	23 May 2002	29 January 2003	
Sybrand van Haersma Buma	CDA	23 May 2002	29 January 2003	
Femke Halsema	GL	23 May 2002	29 January 2003	
Boris van der Ham	D66	23 May 2002	29 January 2003	
Mariëtte Hamer	PvdA	23 May 2002	29 January 2003	
Maarten Haverkamp	CDA	26 July 2002	29 January 2003	
Peter van Heemst	PvdA	23 May 2002	29 January 2003	
Mat Herben	LPF	23 May 2002	29 January 2003	
Eveline Herfkens	PvdA	23 May 2002	25 July 2002	
Loek Hermans	VVD	23 May 2002	24 July 2002	
Jos Hessels	CDA	23 May 2002	29 January 2003	
Godelieve van Heteren	PvdA	17 October 2002	29 January 2003	
Maria van der Hoeven	CDA	23 May 2002	21 July 2002	
Pieter Hofstra	VVD	23 May 2002	29 January 2003	
Henk van Hoof	VVD	23 May 2002	29 January 2003	
Ferry Hoogendijk	LPF	23 May 2002	29 January 2003	
Hans Hoogervorst	VVD	23 May 2002	21 July 2002	
Jan ten Hoopen	CDA	23 May 2002	29 January 2003	
Tineke Huizinga-Heringa	CU	23 May 2002	29 January 2003	
Rikus Jager	CDA	23 May 2002	29 January 2003	
Jim Janssen van Raaij	LPF	23 May 2002	29 January 2003	
Dick Jense	LN	23 May 2002	29 January 2003	
Cisca Joldersma	CDA	23 May 2002	29 January 2003	
Winny de Jong	LPF	23 May 2002	29 January 2003	
Annemarie Jorritsma-Lebbink	VVD	23 May 2002	29 January 2003	
Gerlof Jukema	LPF	23 May 2002	29 January 2003	
Ella Kalsbeek	PvdA	23 May 2002	29 January 2003	
Henk Kamp	VVD	23 May 2002	21 July 2002	
Agnes Kant	SP	23 May 2002	29 January 2003	
Farah Karimi	GL	23 May 2002	29 January 2003	
Jan Hendrik Klein Molekamp	VVD	26 July 2002	29 January 2003	
Cees van der Knaap	CDA	23 May 2002	21 July 2002	
Bert Koenders	PvdA	23 May 2002	29 January 2003	
Myra Koomen	CDA	26 July 2002	29 January 2003	
Ger Koopmans	CDA	23 May 2002	29 January 2003	
Roland Kortenhorst	CDA	23 May 2002	29 January 2003	
Benk Korthals	VVD	23 May 2002	21 July 2002	
Ursie Lambrechts	D66	23 May 2002	29 January 2003	
Ali Lazrak	SP	23 May 2002	29 January 2003	
Erik van Lith	CDA	23 May 2002	29 January 2003	
Ruud Luchtenveld	VVD	26 July 2002	29 January 2003	
Jan Marijnissen	SP	23 May 2002	29 January 2003	
Jan Mastwijk	CDA	23 May 2002	29 January 2003	
Theo Meijer	CDA	23 May 2002	29 January 2003	
Ad Melkert	PvdA	23 May 2002	16 October 2002	
Aart Mosterd	CDA	23 May 2002	29 January 2003	
Frans de Nerée tot Babberich	CDA	11 June 2002	29 January 2003	
Tineke Netelenbos	PvdA	23 May 2002	29 January 2003	
Atzo Nicolaï	VVD	23 May 2002	21 July 2002	
Jeltje van Nieuwenhoven	PvdA	23 May 2002	29 January 2003	
Saskia Noorman-den Uyl	PvdA	23 May 2002	29 January 2003	
Niny van Oerle-van der Horst	CDA	23 May 2002	29 January 2003	
Gert-Jan Oplaat	VVD	26 July 2002	29 January 2003	
Henk Jan Ormel	CDA	23 May 2002	29 January 2003	
Gerritjan van Oven	PvdA	10 September 2002	29 January 2003	
Frits Palm	LPF	23 May 2002	29 January 2003	
Marleen de Pater-van der Meer	CDA	23 May 2002	29 January 2003	
Nirmala Rambocus	CDA	23 May 2002	29 January 2003	
Peter Rehwinkel	PvdA	3 September 2002	19 November 2002	
Johan Remkes	VVD	23 May 2002	21 July 2002	
Theo Rietkerk	CDA	23 May 2002	29 January 2003	
Jan Rijpstra	VVD	23 May 2002	29 January 2003	
Paul Rosenmöller	GL	23 May 2002	29 January 2003	
Clémence Ross-van Dorp	CDA	23 May 2002	21 July 2002	
André Rouvoet	CU	23 May 2002	29 January 2003	
Jan van Ruiten	LPF	23 May 2002	29 January 2003	
Piet de Ruiter	SP	23 May 2002	29 January 2003	
Fred Schonewille	LPF	23 May 2002	29 January 2003	
Annie Schreijer-Pierik	CDA	23 May 2002	29 January 2003	
Arie Slob	CU	19 November 2002	29 January 2003	
Margreeth Smilde	CDA	26 July 2002	29 January 2003	
Hans Smolders	LPF	23 May 2002	29 January 2003	
Harry Smulders	LPF	23 May 2002	29 January 2003	
Liesbeth Spies	CDA	23 May 2002	29 January 2003	
Kees van der Staaij	SGP	23 May 2002	29 January 2003	
Mirjam Sterk	CDA	23 May 2002	29 January 2003	
Olaf Stuger	LPF	23 May 2002	29 January 2003	
Fred Teeven	LN	23 May 2002	29 January 2003	
Erica Terpstra	VVD	23 May 2002	29 January 2003	
Jacques Tichelaar	PvdA	23 May 2002	29 January 2003	
Frans Timmermans	PvdA	23 May 2002	29 January 2003	
Evelien Tonkens	GL	23 May 2002	29 January 2003	
João Varela	LPF	23 May 2002	29 January 2003	
Willem van der Velden	LPF	26 July 2002	29 January 2003	
Jan te Veldhuis	VVD	23 May 2002	29 January 2003	
Kars Veling	CU	23 May 2002	11 November 2002	
Krista van Velzen	SP	23 May 2002	29 January 2003	
Kees Vendrik	GL	23 May 2002	29 January 2003	
Gerdi Verbeet	PvdA	26 July 2002	29 January 2003	
Nellie Verbugt	VVD	26 July 2002	29 January 2003	
Gerda Verburg	CDA	23 May 2002	29 January 2003	
Fenna Vergeer-Mudde	SP	23 May 2002	29 January 2003	
Maxime Verhagen	CDA	23 May 2002	29 January 2003	
Willem Vermeend	PvdA	23 May 2002	25 July 2002	
Antoinette Vietsch	CDA	23 May 2002	29 January 2003	
Bas van der Vlies	SGP	23 May 2002	29 January 2003	
Marijke Vos	GL	23 May 2002	29 January 2003	
Hella Voûte-Droste	VVD	23 May 2002	3 September 2002	
Bibi de Vries	VVD	23 May 2002	29 January 2003	
Gijs de Vries	VVD	23 May 2002	7 October 2002	
Jan de Vries	CDA	23 May 2002	29 January 2003	
Klaas de Vries	PvdA	23 May 2002	29 January 2003	
Monique de Vries	VVD	23 May 2002	29 January 2003	
Nicolien van Vroonhoven	CDA	23 May 2002	29 January 2003	
Frans Weisglas	VVD	23 May 2002	29 January 2003	
Harm Wiersma	LPF	23 May 2002	29 January 2003	
Joop Wijn	CDA	23 May 2002	21 July 2002	
Harry Wijnschenk	LPF (Note: Until 13 November 2002)	28 May 2002	29 January 2003	
Harry Wijnschenk	Wijnschenk (Note: From 14 November 2002)	28 May 2002	29 January 2003	
Geert Wilders	VVD	26 July 2002	29 January 2003	
Bart van Winsen	CDA	23 May 2002	29 January 2003	
Jan de Wit	SP	23 May 2002	29 January 2003	
Aleid Wolfsen	PvdA	23 May 2002	29 January 2003	
Gerrit Zalm	VVD	23 May 2002	29 January 2003	
Fieroes Zeroual	LPF	23 May 2002	29 January 2003	
Milos Zvonar	LPF	23 May 2002	29 January 2003	

== See also ==
- List of candidates in the 2002 Dutch general election
