= List of candidates in the 2002 Dutch general election =

Prior to the 2002 Dutch general election, contesting parties put forward party lists.

== 1: Labour Party ==
Candidate list for Labour Party
| Position | Candidate | Votes | Result |
|---|---|---|---|
| 1 | Ad Melkert | 802,723 | Elected |
| 2 | Jeltje van Nieuwenhoven | 233,374 | Elected |
| 3 | Klaas de Vries | 38,543 | Elected |
| 4 | Margo Vliegenthart | 27,344 | Elected, but declined |
| 5 | Willem Vermeend | 36,653 | Elected |
| 6 | Tineke Netelenbos-Koomen | 7,306 | Elected |
| 7 | Dick Benschop | 5,768 | Elected |
| 8 | Eveline Herfkens | 9,836 | Elected |
| 9 | Wouter Bos | 121,021 | Elected |
| 10 | Nebahat Albayrak | 31,548 | Elected |
| 11 | Adri Duivesteijn | 2,019 | Elected |
| 12 | Karin Adelmund | 4,824 | Elected |
| 13 | Jan Pronk | 24,833 | Elected, but declined |
| 14 | Ella Kalsbeek | 2,316 | Elected |
| 15 | Bert Koenders | 1,264 | Elected |
| 16 | Jet Bussemaker | 1,296 | Elected |
| 17 | Ferd Crone | 596 | Elected |
| 18 | Khadija Arib | 8,602 | Elected |
| 19 | Frans Timmermans | 4,780 | Elected |
| 20 | Sharon Dijksma | 6,142 | Elected |
| 21 | Peter van Heemst | 1,307 | Elected |
| 22 | Mariette Hamer | 654 | Elected |
| 23 | Aleid Wolfsen | 375 | Elected |
| 24 | Saskia Noorman-den Uyl | 4,800 | Replacement |
| 25 | Jacques Tichelaar | 1,180 | Replacement |
| 26 | Gerdi Verbeet | 416 | Replacement |
| 27 | Peter Rehwinkel | 1,757 | Replacement |
| 28 | Marja Wagenaar | 646 | Replacement |
| 29 | Gerritjan van Oven | 287 | Replacement |
| 30 | Godelieve van Heteren | 1,873 | Replacement |
| 31 | Jeroen Dijsselbloem | 7,423 | Replacement |
| 32 | Marleen Barth | 2,185 | |
| 33 | Diederik Samsom | 1,298 | |
| 34 | José Smits | 1,018 | |
| 35 | Dick de Cloe | 841 | |
| 36 | Tineke Witteveen-Hevinga | 1,953 | |
| 37 | Paul Maes | 402 | |
| 38 | Annet van der Hoek | 2,189 | |
| 39 | Harm Evert Waalkens | 2,815 | |
| 40 | Sonia Westerveld | 4,830 | |
| 41 | Staf Depla | 522 | |
| 42 | Bert Middel | 1,131 | |
| 43 | Eppo Bolhuis | 287 | |
| 44 | Lia Roefs | 922 | |
| 45 | Thea Fierens | 227 | |
| 46 | Usman Santi | 3,205 | |
| 47 | Omar Ramadan | 2,418 | |
| 48 | Walter Etty | 337 | |
| 49 | Jaap Jelle Feenstra | 597 | |
| 50 | Desirée Duijkers | 327 | |
| 51 | Arie Kuijper | 1,618 | |
| 52 | Gertjan Boekraad | 316 | |
| 53 | Willem Herrebrugh | 262 | |
| 54 | Roos Vermeij | 451 | |
| 55 | Gerard Bosman | 1,461 | |
| 56 | Johan Brongers | 3,697 | |
| 57 | Kris Douma | 626 | |
| 58 | Angelien Eijsink | 601 | |
| 59 | Han Noten | 332 | |
| 60 | Jan Marinus Wiersma | 428 | |
| 61 | Varina Tjon A Ten | 999 | |
| 62 | Wim Beekman | 359 | |
| 63 | Bert Kreemers | 169 | |
| 64 | Zeynep Alantor | 1,250 | |
| 65 | Jurgen Warmerdam | 277 | |
| 66 | Lau Schulpen | 331 | |
| 67 | Lydia Giltaij-Lansink | 266 | |
| 68 | Serv Wiemers | 284 | |
| 69 | Leen Verbeek | 189 | |
| 70 | Hannie Stuurman | 259 | |
| 71 | Marjan van Giezen | 407 | |
| 72 | Co Verdaas | 385 | |
| 73 | Hans van der Marck | 170 | |
| 74 | Roland Kip | 1,876 | |
| Total | | | |

== 2: People's Party for Freedom and Democracy ==
Candidate list for People's Party for Freedom and Democracy
| Position | Candidate | Votes | Result |
|---|---|---|---|
| 1 | Hans Dijkstal | 719,320 | Elected |
| 2 | Annemarie Jorritsma-Lebbink | 144,413 | Elected |
| 3 | Gerrit Zalm | 350,007 | Elected |
| 4 | Erica Terpstra | 74,574 | Elected |
| 5 | Loek Hermans | 6,219 | Elected |
| 6 | Benk Korthals | 4,804 | Elected |
| 7 | Frank de Grave | 11,518 | Elected |
| 8 | Jozias van Aartsen | 3,030 | Elected |
| 9 | Hella Voûte-Droste | 9,440 | Elected |
| 10 | Johan Remkes | 3,505 | Elected |
| 11 | Clemens Cornielje | 1,623 | Elected |
| 12 | Hans Hoogervorst | 1,489 | Elected |
| 13 | Henk Kamp | 36,138 | Elected |
| 14 | Henk van Hoof | 899 | Elected |
| 15 | Anke van Blerck-Woerdman | 4,456 | Elected |
| 16 | Gijs de Vries | 798 | Elected |
| 17 | Willibrord van Beek | 1,012 | Elected |
| 18 | Monique de Vries | 1,806 | Elected |
| 19 | Pieter Hofstra | 2,372 | Elected |
| 20 | Frans Weisglas | 2,245 | Elected |
| 21 | Jan Rijpstra | 1,171 | Elected |
| 22 | Bibi de Vries | 1,328 | Elected |
| 23 | Jan te Veldhuis | 977 | Elected |
| 24 | Atzo Nicolaï | 828 | Elected |
| 25 | Nellie Verbugt | 5,040 | Replacement |
| 26 | Ruud Luchtenveld | 499 | Replacement |
| 27 | Gert Jan Oplaat | 2,672 | Replacement |
| 28 | Jan Hendrik Klein Molekamp | 465 | Replacement |
| 29 | Jan Dirk Blaauw | 705 | Replacement |
| 30 | Geert Wilders | 2,522 | Replacement |
| 31 | Stef Blok | 4,969 | Replacement |
| 32 | Theo van den Doel | 1,215 | Replacement |
| 33 | Jan Geluk | 2,804 | Replacement |
| 34 | Janneke Snijder-Hazelhoff | 3,413 | |
| 35 | Frans Weekers | 6,156 | |
| 36 | Arno Visser | 735 | |
| 37 | Fadime Örgü | 9,883 | |
| 38 | Laetitia Griffith | 541 | |
| 39 | Eric Balemans | 520 | |
| 40 | Charlie Aptroot | 727 | |
| 41 | Hans van Baalen | 1,500 | |
| 42 | Paul de Krom | 333 | |
| 43 | Ton Hooijmaijers | 7,871 | |
| 44 | Jan Maurits Faber | 475 | |
| 45 | Otto Vos | 590 | |
| 46 | Janmarc Lenards | 318 | |
| 47 | Jacques Niederer | 6,599 | |
| 48 | Ernst van Splunter | 314 | |
| 49 | Edith Schippers | 454 | |
| 50 | Ton de Swart | 271 | |
| 51 | Hugo Hurts | 643 | |
| 52 | Anton van Schijndel | 3,439 | |
| 53 | Enric Hessing | 243 | |
| 54 | Jelleke Veenendaal | 718 | |
| 55 | Menno Knot | 610 | |
| 56 | Christel Bottenheft | 2,119 | |
| 57 | Thijs Udo | 400 | |
| 58 | Joost Manusama | 460 | |
| 59 | Wim Passtoors | 221 | |
| 60 | Karina Kuperus | 397 | |
| 61 | Ingrid Muijs | 1,408 | |
| 62 | Sammy van Tuyll van Serooskerken | 345 | |
| 63 | Bernd Taselaar | 178 | |
| 64 | Arjen Gerritsen | 226 | |
| 65 | Annemieke de Beer-Vermeulen | 352 | |
| 66 | Jan Verhoeven | 585 | |
| 67 | Laurine Bonnewits-de Jong | 314 | |
| 68 | Max Kerremans | 118 | |
| 69 | Peter de Baat | 165 | |
| 70 | Remco Kouwenhoven | 194 | |
| 71 | Renee Spermon-Marijnen | 549 | |
| 72–76 | Regional candidates | | |
| Total | | | |

=== Regional candidates ===
Regional candidates for People's Party for Freedom and Democracy
| Candidate | Votes | Result | Position per electoral district | | | |
| Candidate | Votes | Result | Groningen, Leeuwarden, Assen, Zwolle, Lelystad | Nijmegen, Arnhem, Tilburg, 's-Hertogenbosch, Maastricht | Utrecht, Amsterdam, Haarlem, Den Helder | 's-Gravenhage, Rotterdam, Dordrecht, Leiden, Middelburg |
|---|---|---|---|---|---|---|
| Erna van der Bent-Molendijk | 146 | | | | | 75 |
| Robert Jan Blom | 840 | | | | | 73 |
| Jan Borghuis | 54 | | | | 74 | |
| Ingrid Bruaset-Schouten | 270 | | | 75 | | |
| Peter Groenestein | 976 | | | 76 | | |
| Anne Marie Hey | 318 | | | | 73 | |
| Sandra Korthuis | 1,409 | | | | | 76 |
| René Leegte | 440 | | 75 | | | |
| Jaap Paans | 130 | | | | | 72 |
| Frank Perquin | 68 | | 73 | | | |
| Hans Pluckel | 72 | | | | 72 | |
| Det Regts | 62 | | | | | 74 |
| Marnix de Ridder | 636 | | | 72 | | |
| Koen Schuiling | 220 | | 72 | | | |
| Maarten Velthoen | 135 | | | 74 | | |
| Attje Waal-van Seijen | 181 | | 74 | | | |
| Hans van Xanten | 212 | | | 73 | | |
| Frans Zomers | 1,306 | | | | 75 | |

== 3: Christian Democratic Appeal ==
Candidate list for Christian Democratic Appeal
| Position | Candidate | Votes | Result |
|---|---|---|---|
| 1 | Jan Peter Balkenende | 2,276,175 | Elected |
| 2 | Maria van der Hoeven | 86,334 | Elected |
| 3 | Pieter van Geel | 34,261 | Elected |
| 4 | Clémence Ross-van Dorp | 10,527 | Elected |
| 5 | Joop Atsma | 22,506 | Elected |
| 6 | Gerda Verburg | 9,017 | Elected |
| 7 | Joop Wijn | 4,659 | Elected |
| 8 | Kathleen Ferrier | 4,652 | Elected |
| 9 | Theo Rietkerk | 6,710 | Elected |
| 10 | Siem Buijs | 3,099 | Elected |
| 11 | Maxime Verhagen | 1,984 | Elected |
| 12 | Camiel Eurlings | 72,521 | Elected |
| 13 | Nancy Dankers | 3,008 | Elected, but declined |
| 14 | Agnes van Ardenne-van der Hoeven | 4,214 | Elected |
| 15 | Coşkun Çörüz | 7,657 | Elected |
| 16 | Cees van der Knaap | 1,052 | Elected |
| 17 | Niny van Oerle-van der Horst | 1,102 | Elected |
| 18 | Aart Mosterd | 2,284 | Elected |
| 19 | Annie Schreijer-Pierik | 14,153 | Elected |
| 20 | Bas Jan van Bochove | 1,277 | Elected |
| 21 | Theo Meijer | 12,863 | Elected |
| 22 | Sybrand van Haersma Buma | 528 | Elected |
| 23 | Henk de Haan | 641 | Elected |
| 24 | Wim van de Camp | 2,881 | Elected |
| 25 | Nicolien van Vroonhoven-Kok | 928 | Elected |
| 26 | Jan ten Hoopen | 750 | Elected |
| 27 | Mirjam Sterk | 1,699 | Elected |
| 28 | Cisca Joldersma | 1,661 | Elected |
| 29 | Marleen de Pater-van der Meer | 1,094 | Elected |
| 30 | Jan Mastwijk | 3,524 | Elected |
| 31 | Roland Kortenhorst | 10,444 | Elected |
| 32 | Ger Koopmans | 10,487 | Elected |
| 33 | Henk Jan Ormel | 6,598 | Elected |
| 34 | Nirmala Rambocus | 2,457 | Elected |
| 35 | Jos Hessels | 4,971 | Elected |
| 36 | Liesbeth Spies | 881 | Elected |
| 37 | Antoinette Vietsch | 458 | Elected |
| 38 | Jan de Vries | 902 | Elected |
| 39 | Bart van Winsen | 930 | Elected |
| 40 | Rikus Jager | 1,029 | Elected |
| 41 | Hubert Bruls | 676 | Elected |
| 42 | Cecilia van Weel-Niesten | 572 | Elected, but declined |
| 43 | Ine Aasted-Madsen-van Stiphout | 2,558 | Elected |
| 44 | Erik van Lith | 1,483 | Replacement |
| 45 | Frans de Nerée tot Babberich | 212 | Replacement |
| 46 | Rendert Algra | 603 | Replacement |
| 47 | Myra van Loon-Koomen | 222 | Replacement |
| 48 | Margreeth Smilde | 478 | Replacement |
| 49 | Wim van Fessem | 724 | Replacement |
| 50–57 | Regional candidates | | |
| Total | | | |

=== Regional candidates ===
Regional candidates for Christian Democratic Appeal
| Candidate | Votes | Result | Position per electoral district | | | | | | | | | |
| Candidate | Votes | Result | Groningen, Leeuwarden, Assen, Lelystad | Zwolle | Nijmegen, Arnhem | Utrecht, Tilburg, 's-Hertogenbosch, Maastricht | Amsterdam, Haarlem, Den Helder | Den Haag | Rotterdam | Dordrecht | Leiden | Middelburg |
|---|---|---|---|---|---|---|---|---|---|---|---|---|
| Fatma Aktas | 226 | | | | | | | 55 | | | | |
| Lucas Bolsius | 54 | | | | | | | | 52 | | | |
| Bob Braber | 182 | | | | | | | | | 56 | | |
| Gert-Jan Buitendijk | 235 | | | | | | | | | 53 | | |
| Paula van den Burg-Boersma | 94 | | | | | | | | | | 51 | |
| Yiu Cheung | 402 | | | | | | | | 55 | | | |
| Elly Cornelisse-Putter | 316 | | | | | | 53 | | | | | |
| Peter Cuyvers | 12 | | | | | | | 53 | | | | |
| Greeth Dekkers-Postma | 328 | | | | 55 | | | | | | | |
| Margo Dierick-van de Ven | 291 | | | | | | 55 | | | | | |
| Jan Jacob van Dijk | 82 | Replacement | | | 50 | | | | | | | |
| Pieter den Dulk | 69 | | | | | | | 51 | | | | |
| Alaattin Erdal | 553 | | | | | | | | 53 | | | |
| Nihat Eski | 268 | | | 51 | | 50 | | | | | | |
| Marcel Ganzeman | 60 | | | | | | | | | | | 56 |
| Jos Geukers | 387 | | | 54 | | 53 | | | | | | |
| Arthur Gieles | 57 | | | | 54 | | | | | | | |
| Foka Haitsma | 82 | | | 52 | | 51 | | | | | | |
| Ben Hakvoort | 289 | | | | | | 54 | | | | | |
| Els Hardjopawiro | 78 | | | | | | | | 56 | | | |
| Adri Hartman | 88 | | | | | | | 56 | | | | |
| Maarten Haverkamp | 188 | Replacement | | | | | 50 | | | | | |
| Dick van Hemmen | 171 | | 50 | | | | | | | | | |
| Eddy van Hijum | 408 | | | 50 | | 55 | | | | | | |
| Ton van Huut | 111 | | | | | | | | | | 54 | |
| Siem Jansen | 208 | | 54 | | | | | | | | | |
| Arend Jansen | 243 | | | | 57 | | | | | | | |
| Jaap Jonk | 69 | | | | 52 | | | | | | | |
| Arjan Klein Nibbelink | 1,020 | | | 56 | | 56 | 57 | | | | | |
| Anne Marie Knottnerus-van der Veen | 348 | | 55 | | | | | | | | | |
| Teuny Kok-Schot | 108 | | | | 53 | | | | | | | |
| Manita Koop | 436 | | | 55 | | 54 | | 50 | 50 | 50 | 50 | |
| Rein Leentfaar | 133 | | | | | | | | | | | 57 |
| Charles Linssen | 71 | | | | | | | | | | | 53 |
| Koos Meulenberg-op ‘t Hof | 44 | | | | | | | | | | | 52 |
| Arnold Michielsen | 192 | | 56 | | | | | | | | | |
| Sien de Mol-Marcusse | 132 | | | | | | | | | | | 54 |
| Bien van Noord-Hasper | 277 | | 57 | | | | | | | | | |
| René Paas | 507 | | 52 | | | | | | | | | |
| Ben Pauwels | 524 | | | | | | | | | | | 51 |
| Robbert Jan Piet | 309 | | | | | | 56 | | | | | |
| Jan Ploeg | 87 | | 51 | | | | | | | | | |
| Leny Poppe-de Looff | 163 | | | | | | | | | | | 50 |
| Joop Post | 113 | | | | | | 52 | | | | | |
| Loes van Ruijven-van Leeuwen | 128 | | | | | | | | | 51 | | |
| Jaap Schuijt | 179 | | | | | | | | | | 53 | |
| Antonio Silva | 205 | | | | | | | | 54 | | | |
| Jozef Siwpersad | 259 | | | | | | | 54 | | | | |
| Wilbert Stolte | 59 | | | | | | | 52 | | | | |
| Sjaak van der Tak | 167 | | | | | | | | 51 | | | |
| Wim van Tatenhove | 57 | | | | | | | | | | | 55 |
| Geeske Telgen-Swarts | 125 | | | | 51 | | | | | | | |
| Ayhan Tonca | 420 | | | | 56 | | | | | | | |
| Vera Tuin-Bossong | 367 | | | | | | 51 | | | | | |
| Govert Veldhuijzen | 210 | | | | | | | | | 55 | | |
| Koos Verbeek | 175 | | | | | | | | | 54 | | |
| Chris Vink | 258 | | | | | | | | | | 55 | |
| Martine Visser | 133 | | | 53 | | 52 | | | | | | |
| Cornelis Visser | 75 | | | | | | | | | 52 | | |
| Dick van Vliet | 56 | | | | | | | | | | 52 | |
| Marianne Wiegmann-de Wild | 225 | | | | | | | | | | 56 | |
| Harry Zomer | 164 | | 53 | | | | | | | | | |

== 4: Democrats 66 ==
Candidate list for Democrats 66
| Position | Candidate | Votes | Result |
|---|---|---|---|
| 1 | Thom de Graaf | 371,033 | Elected |
| 2 | Roger van Boxtel | 33,360 | Elected, but declined |
| 3 | Boris Dittrich | 23,681 | Elected |
| 4 | Francine Giskes | 25,200 | Elected |
| 5 | Bert Bakker | 1,445 | Elected |
| 6 | Ursie Lambrechts | 3,803 | Elected |
| 7 | Vivien van Geen | 2,574 | Elected |
| 8 | Boris van der Ham | 2,137 | |
| 9 | Hein Westerouen van Meeteren | 1,065 | |
| 10 | Michiel Verbeek | (Note: Not all votes are visible in the source) | |
| 11 | Fatma Koşer-Kaya | | |
| 12 | Francisca Ravestein | 1,879 | |
| 13 | Ageeth Telleman-Kraan | 958 | |
| 14 | Dennis Hesseling | 279 | |
| 15 | Ingrid van Engelshoven | 1,305 | |
| 16 | Hans Crebas | 227 | |
| 17 | Ruud Coolen-van Brakel | 402 | |
| 18 | Floor Kist | 561 | |
| 19 | Michiel Scheffer | 319 | |
| 20 | Frits van der Schans | 203 | |
| 21 | Simone Filippini | 494 | |
| 22 | Bart Slagter | 299 | |
| 23 | Dick Ross | 425 | |
| 24 | Lia de Ridder | 666 | |
| 25 | Paul Wessels | | |
| 26–30 | Regional candidates | | |
| Total | | | |

=== Regional candidates ===
Regional candidates for Democrats 66
| Candidate | Votes | Result | Position per electoral district | | | | | | | | | | | | | | | | | | |
| Candidate | Votes | Result | Groningen | Leeuwarden | Assen | Zwolle | Lelystad | Nijmegen | Arnhem | Utrecht | Amsterdam | Haarlem | Den Helder | Den Haag | Rotterdam | Dordrecht | Leiden | Middelburg | Tilburg | Den Bosch | Maastricht |
|---|---|---|---|---|---|---|---|---|---|---|---|---|---|---|---|---|---|---|---|---|---|
| Harry van Alphen | 93 | | | | | | | 29 | 28 | | | | | | | | | 29 | | | |
| Loes Baselier-Hamers | 314 | | | | | | | | | | | | | | | 30 | | | 30 | | |
| Harry Bleeker | 173 | | | 30 | | | | | | | 30 | | | | | | | | | | |
| Freddy Blommers | 150 | | | | | 29 | | | | | | | | | | | 30 | | | | |
| Latifa Cherrabi | 198 | | | | | | | 26 | | 26 | | | | | | | | | 26 | | |
| Marcèl van Dalen | 90 | | | 27 | | | | 27 | 27 | | | | | | | | | | | | |
| Ron Dujardin | 112 | | | | | | | | | | | | | | | 28 | 29 | | 29 | | |
| Malika Faqir | 259 | | | | | | | | | | | | | | | | 28 | 28 | | | 29 |
| Rineke Gieske-Mastenbroek | 478 | | | | | 30 | | | | | | 30 | | | | | | | | | |
| Annet Habets | 77 | | 30 | | | | | | | | | | | | | | | | | | 30 |
| Klaas Hamersma | 82 | | 29 | | 30 | 28 | | | | | | | | | | | | | | | |
| Ron Hendriks | 126 | | | | | | | | | 27 | | | | | | | | | | 29 | 27 |
| Rob van der Hilst | 44 | | | | | | | | 29 | 29 | | | | | | | | | | | |
| Theo Hooghiemstra | 45 | | | 26 | | 26 | | | | | | | | 27 | | | | | | | |
| Lodewijk Imkamp | 584 | | | | | | | | 26 | | | | | | | | | | | 27 | 26 |
| Dirk Kramer | | | 26 | | | | | | | | | 26 | | 26 | | | | | | | |
| Annemarie Lammers-van Doesburg | 104 | | | | | | 29 | | | | | 28 | | | 29 | | | | | | |
| Lidwien van Langen | 177 | | 27 | | | | 27 | | | | 28 | | | | | | | | | | |
| Erwin van der Lem | 106 | | | | | | | 30 | | | | | | 30 | | | | | | | |
| Riet Loos-Duiverman | 72 | | | | | | 30 | | | 28 | | | | | | | | | | | |
| Miep Nagtegaal | 95 | | | | 27 | 27 | | | | | | | | | | | 27 | | | | |
| Dennis van Nieuwenhuijzen | 323 | | | | | | | | | | | | | | | | | 27 | 28 | 28 | |
| Rien Olijve | 137 | | | 29 | 29 | | | | | | | | | | | 29 | | | | | |
| Gaitrie Pahladsingh-Bharos | 489 | | | | | | | | | | | | | | 27 | 26 | 26 | | | | |
| Niek Peters | 250 | | | | | | | | | | | | 29 | | 30 | | | 30 | | | |
| Marie-Louise Schulten | 379 | | | | | | | | 30 | 30 | | | | | | | | | | | |
| Gerrit Sipkes | 69 | | 28 | 28 | 28 | | | | | | | | | | | | | | | | |
| Rudi Speear | 30 | | | | | | | | | | 29 | | 28 | 29 | | | | | | | |
| Dick Teegelaar | 77 | | | | 26 | | | | | | | | | | 28 | 27 | | | | | |
| Anneke Terwiel-Kuneman | 186 | | | | | | | | | | | 29 | 30 | | | | | | | | |
| Ruud van Veggel | 177 | | | | | | | 28 | | | | | | | | | | | | 30 | 28 |
| Theo Veltman | 32 | | | | | | 26 | | | | 26 | | 26 | | | | | | | | |
| André van Wanrooij | 319 | | | | | | | | | | | | | | | | | 26 | 27 | 26 | |
| Han Westerhof | 59 | | | | | | 28 | | | | | 27 | 27 | | | | | | | | |
| Müslüm Yildirim | 529 | | | | | | | | | | 27 | | | 28 | 26 | | | | | | |

== 5: GroenLinks ==
Candidate list for GroenLinks
| Position | Candidate | Votes | Result |
|---|---|---|---|
| 1 | Paul Rosenmöller | 467,641 | Elected |
| 2 | Femke Halsema | 116,486 | Elected |
| 3 | Marijke Vos | 18,886 | Elected |
| 4 | Wijnand Duijvendak | 3,128 | Elected |
| 5 | Kees Vendrik | 1,039 | Elected |
| 6 | Farah Karimi | 12,626 | Elected |
| 7 | Evelien Tonkens | 1,938 | Elected |
| 8 | Arie van den Brand | 875 | Elected |
| 9 | Ineke van Gent | 2,974 | Elected |
| 10 | Naima Azough | | Elected |
| 11 | Ab Harrewijn | | |
| 12 | Hugo van der Steenhoven | 512 | |
| 13 | Tineke Strik | 1,356 | |
| 14 | Wilna van Aartsen | 612 | |
| 15 | Arno Bonte | 724 | |
| 16 | Nen van Ramshorst | 400 | |
| 17 | Roel van Duijn | 2,783 | |
| 18 | Doğan Gök | 3,133 | |
| 19 | Wil Codrington | 1,241 | |
| 20 | Jelis van Leeuwen | 283 | |
| 21 | Luc Houx | 126 | |
| 22 | Stan Termeer | 150 | |
| 23 | Nelleke van Wijk | 1,016 | |
| 24 | Farid Tabarki | 1,222 | |
| 25–30 | Regional candidates | | |
| Total | | | |

=== Regional candidates ===
Regional candidates for GroenLinks
| Candidate | Votes | Result | Position per electoral district | | | | | | | | | | | |
| Candidate | Votes | Result | Groningen | Leeuwarden | Assen | Zwolle | Lelystad | Nijmegen, Arnhem | Utrecht | Amsterdam, Haarlem, Den Helder | 's-Gravenhage, Rotterdam, Dordrecht, Leiden | Middelburg | Tilburg, 's-Hertogenbosch | Maastricht |
|---|---|---|---|---|---|---|---|---|---|---|---|---|---|---|
| Bert van Alphen | 202 | | | | | | | | | | 26 | | | |
| Klaas Blanksma | 46 | | | | 25 | | | | | | | | | |
| Theo van de Bles | | | | 25 | | | | | | | | | | |
| Gertrude Bomer-van der Mheen | 116 | | | | | | | 26 | | | | | | |
| Harry Borghouts | 894 | | 30 | 30 | 30 | 29 | 30 | 30 | 30 | 30 | 30 | 30 | 30 | 30 |
| Henk van Boxtel | 133 | | | | | | | | | | | | 25 | |
| Kees Bozelie | 106 | | | | | | | | | 26 | | | | |
| Glenn Braam | 96 | | | | | | | | | 29 | | | | |
| Maya de Bruijn-Reefman | 686 | | | | | | | | | | | | | 25 |
| Karin Dekker | 290 | | 26 | | | | | | | | | | | |
| Willemien Dirks | 112 | | | | 27 | | | | | | | | | |
| Chantalle Dupont | 95 | | | | | | | | | | | 27 | | |
| Bernhard Ensink | 46 | | | | 29 | | | | | | | | | |
| Kees Feenstra | 144 | | | 26 | | | | | | | | | | |
| Meindert Fennema | 86 | | | | | | | | | 27 | | | | |
| Peter Freij | | | | | | | | | | | | | | 26 |
| Annette Gepkens | 240 | | | | | | | | | | | | 26 | |
| Ank de Groot-Slagter | 169 | | | | | | | | | | 25 | | | |
| Helma Gubbels-Korver | 531 | | | | | | | | | | | | | 27 |
| Roel van Gurp | 494 | | | | | | | | | | | | 27 | |
| Hetty Hafkamp | 305 | | | 27 | | | | | | | | | | |
| Luuk Heijlman | 56 | | | | | | | | | 25 | | | | |
| Klaas Wybo van der Hoek | 44 | | 27 | | | | | | | | | | | |
| Sjaak van 't Hof | 166 | | | | | | | 28 | | | | | | |
| Anneke Izeboud | 97 | | | | | | | | | | | 29 | | |
| Chris Jansen | 141 | | | | | | | 29 | | | | | | |
| Patrick Jansen | 89 | | | | | | | 27 | | | | | | |
| Marcel de Jong | 19 | | | | | | | | 28 | | | | | |
| Henk Koetsier | 47 | | | | | | | | | 28 | | | | |
| Frans van Kollem | | | | | | | | | | | | 25 | | |
| Appie Kootstra | 132 | | 25 | | | | | | | | | | | |
| Henk Koster | | | | | | 26 | | | | | | | | |
| Wouter van Kouwen | 57 | | | | | | | | 26 | | | | | |
| Theo Kuipers | 24 | | | | | | 29 | | | | | | | |
| Jan Langenkamp | 40 | | | | 26 | | | | | | | | | |
| Cees Meijer | 14 | | | | | | 26 | | | | | | | |
| Herman Meijer | 272 | | | | | | | | | | 29 | | | |
| Jan Muijtjens | 593 | | | | | | | | | | | | | 28 |
| Henk Nijhof | 188 | | | | | 28 | | | | | | | | |
| Anneke Nusselder | 225 | | | | | 25 | | | | | | | | |
| Mimi van Olphen | 49 | | | | | 27 | | | | | | | | |
| Karin Pals-Schilder | 53 | | | | | | 25 | | | | | | | |
| Rudi Pet | 94 | | | | | | 28 | | | | | | | |
| Annemiek Rijckenberg | 157 | | | | | | | | 29 | | | | | |
| Henk Roor | 54 | | | | | | | | 25 | | | | | |
| Wim van Seeters | 14 | | | | | | | | 27 | | | | | |
| Ankie Smit | 48 | | | | | | | | | | | 28 | | |
| Paul Tameling | 81 | | 29 | | | | | | | | | | | |
| Tof Thissen | 431 | | | | | | | | | | | | | 29 |
| Dirk van Uitert | 90 | | | | | | | 25 | | | | | | |
| Cees van de Ven | 47 | | | | | | | | | | | | 28 | |
| Willem Verf | 123 | | | 28 | | | | | | | | | | |
| Ida Verkerk | 66 | | 28 | | | | | | | | | | | |
| Peer Verkuijlen | 178 | | | | | | | | | | | | 29 | |
| Theo Verlaan | 44 | | | | | | 27 | | | | | | | |
| Marcel Vissers | 84 | | | | | | | | | | 28 | | | |
| Crista Vonkeman | 339 | | | | | | | | | | 27 | | | |
| Marten Wiersma | 69 | | | | | | | | | | | 26 | | |
| Auke Wouda | 83 | | | 29 | | | | | | | | | | |
| Tanya Zeeman | 91 | | | | 28 | | | | | | | | | |

== 6: Socialist Party ==
Candidate list for Socialist Party
| Position | Candidate | Votes | Result |
|---|---|---|---|
| 1 | Jan Marijnissen | 457,749 | Elected |
| 2 | Agnes Kant | 65,384 | Elected |
| 3 | Harry van Bommel | 4,740 | Elected |
| 4 | Jan de Wit | 3,982 | Elected |
| 5 | Krista van Velzen | 4,480 | Elected |
| 6 | Piet de Ruiter | 820 | Elected |
| 7 | Ali Lazrak | 2,398 | Elected |
| 8 | Fenna Vergeer-Mudde | 1,143 | Elected |
| 9 | Arda Gerkens | 633 | Elected |
| 10 | Jolanda Gooiker | 589 | |
| 11 | René Roovers | 645 | |
| 12 | Ewout Irrgang | 244 | |
| 13 | Rosita van Gijlswijk | 1,214 | |
| 14 | Marcellino Bogers | 393 | |
| 15 | Marianne Langkamp | 579 | |
| 16–30 | Regional candidates | | |
| Total | | | |

=== Regional candidates ===
Regional candidates for Socialist Party
| Candidate | Votes | Result | Position per electoral district | | | | | | | | | | | |
| Candidate | Votes | Result | Groningen, Leeuwarden & Assen | Zwolle, Arnhem, Nijmegen | Lelystad, Utrecht | Amsterdam, Haarlem, Den Helder | Den Haag | Rotterdam | Dordrecht | Leiden | Middelburg | Tilburg | Den Bosch | Maastricht |
|---|---|---|---|---|---|---|---|---|---|---|---|---|---|---|
| Remine Albers-Oosterbaan | 197 | | | | | 17 | | | | | | | | |
| Frans Baron | 159 | | 19 | | | | | | | | | | | |
| Jeanny Berg-Lamers | 344 | | | | | | | | | | | | | 20 |
| Carlien Boelhouwer | 207 | | | | | 26 | | | | | | | | |
| Susan de Boer | 260 | | | | | | | | | | | 23 | 23 | |
| Hans de Boer | 36 | | | 19 | | | | | | | | | | |
| Ronald Boorsma | 420 | | 16 | | 27 | 28 | 27 | 27 | 27 | 27 | 27 | 27 | 27 | 27 |
| Marja Bos | 140 | | 26 | | | | | | | | | | | |
| Piet Brauer | 157 | | | | | | | | | | | | | 23 |
| Anneke de Bres-de Langen | 184 | | | | | | | | | | | 25 | 25 | |
| Marijke van den Broek | 204 | | 18 | | | | | | | | | | | |
| Irene Bulk | 148 | | 20 | | | | | | | | | | | |
| Jan Burger | 122 | | | 18 | | | | | | | | | | |
| Erik van der Burgh | 69 | | | | | | | 18 | 18 | | 21 | | | |
| Theo Cornelissen | 124 | | | | | | 18 | 16 | 16 | | | | | |
| Paul Day | 102 | | | | | | 20 | 24 | 23 | 16 | 17 | | | |
| Pieter Elbers | 77 | | | | | 16 | | | | | | | | |
| Gerrie Elfrink | 229 | | | 21 | | | | | | | | | | |
| Hans Elzenga | 77 | | | | | | | | | | 19 | | | |
| Jacqueline Gabriël | 858 | | 27 | 29 | 28 | 27 | 28 | 28 | 28 | 28 | 28 | 28 | 28 | 17 |
| Mariolanda Gareman-Mooiman | 113 | | | | | | 22 | 19 | 20 | 17 | 26 | | | |
| Anton van Geel | 64 | | | | | | | | | | | | | 22 |
| Bernard Gerard | 225 | | | | | | | | | | | 19 | 19 | |
| Jacques Gerard | 91 | | | 24 | | | | | | | | | | |
| Paul Geurts | 342 | | | | | | | | | | | | | 19 |
| Mienk Graatsma | 66 | | | | | 22 | | | | | | | | |
| Jeroen Groot | 75 | | | | 24 | 21 | | | | | | | | |
| Ingrid Gyömörei-Agelink | 148 | | | | | | 19 | 21 | 22 | 21 | 18 | | | |
| Gerard Harmes | 125 | | | | | | 23 | | | 18 | | | | |
| Nico Heijmans | 184 | | | | | | | | | | | 16 | 16 | |
| Hennie Hemmes | 154 | | 17 | | | | | | | | | | | |
| Mariska ten Heuw | 267 | | | 20 | | | | | | | | | | |
| Helga Hijmans | 33 | | | | | | 24 | | | | | | | |
| Hero Hofman | 81 | | 22 | | | | | | | | | | | |
| Hans van Hooft | 262 | | | 22 | | | | | | | | | | |
| Ineke Jager | 82 | | | | | | | 23 | 17 | | 24 | | | |
| Paulus Jansen | 158 | | | | 16 | 23 | | | | | | | | |
| Paul Jonas | 221 | | | | | | 16 | | | 22 | | | | |
| Jeannette de Jong | 113 | | | | 20 | 24 | | | | | | | | |
| Gidia Kap | 150 | | | | 17 | 19 | | | | | | | | |
| Martin Kappers | 47 | | | | | | | 20 | 21 | | | | | |
| Ger Klaus | 184 | | | | | | | | | | | 22 | 21 | |
| Jef Kleijnen | 317 | | | | | | | | | | | | | 21 |
| Leida Koenders | 261 | | | 30 | | | | | | | | | | |
| Tiny Kox | 543 | | | | | | | | | | | 30 | 30 | |
| John Kuijpers | 95 | | | | | | | | | | | | | 26 |
| Edith Kuitert | 103 | | | | | | 17 | 17 | 19 | 23 | 22 | | | |
| Johan Kwisthout | 241 | | | | | | | | | | | 17 | 17 | |
| Paul Lempens | 213 | | | | | | | | | | | | | 24 |
| Edith Lokate-Albers | 56 | | | 23 | | | | | | | | | | |
| Meta Meijer | 12 | | | | 21 | | | | | | | | | |
| Erik Meijer | 46 | | | | | | | 22 | | | | | | |
| Willem van Meurs | 115 | | | | | | | | | | | | 24 | |
| Frans Moor | 211 | | | | | | 30 | 30 | 30 | 30 | 30 | | | |
| Harre van der Nat | 0 | | | | | | | | | 25 | | | | |
| Marisca van Ommen | 130 | | | 26 | | | | | | | | | | |
| Klaas Overdijk | 424 | | | | | | | | | | | | | 18 |
| Ineke Palm | 154 | | | 28 | | | 26 | 26 | 24 | 19 | 20 | | | |
| Hugo Polderman | 125 | | | | | | | | | | | 20 | 22 | |
| Rob de Reuver | 21 | | | | | | | | | 20 | | | | |
| Emile Roemer | 290 | | | | | | | | | | | 21 | 20 | |
| Kees de Roos | 50 | | | | | | | | | | 23 | | | |
| Trix de Roos-Consemulder | 327 | | 28 | | 29 | 29 | | 25 | 26 | 26 | 16 | | | 29 |
| Bob Ruers | 127 | | 29 | 27 | | | 29 | 29 | 29 | 29 | 29 | 29 | 29 | 28 |
| Johan Saarloos | 58 | | 24 | | | | | | | | | | | |
| Harry Sangers | 37 | | | | 22 | | | | | | | | | |
| Frans Schaaf | 202 | | | | | | | | | | | | | 30 |
| Jan van Schaik | 127 | | | | 18 | 18 | | | | | | | | |
| Ad Schiedon | 18 | | | | 23 | | | | | | | | | |
| Corrie Sciacca-Noordhuis | 68 | | 23 | | | | | | | | | | | |
| Henk Snellink | 5 | | | | | | 21 | | | | | | | |
| Math Souren | 0 | | | | | | | | | | | | | 25 |
| Nora Swagerman | 153 | | | | 25 | 20 | | | | | | | | |
| Behnam Taebi | 66 | | | | | | 25 | | 25 | | | | | |
| Anke Tiemens | 83 | | | 25 | | | | | | | | | | |
| Margriet Twisterling | 244 | | | 17 | | | | | | | | | | |
| Alphons Verhoef | 47 | | | | 19 | | | | | | | | | |
| Bart Vermeulen | 31 | | | | | | | | | 24 | | | | |
| Peter Verschuren | 378 | | 30 | | | | | | | | | | | |
| Chris Verschuuren | 32 | | | | | | | | | | | 24 | | |
| Koos Verspoor | 24 | | | | | | | | | | 25 | | | |
| Aly Vos | 94 | | | | 26 | 25 | | | | | | | | |
| Harry Voss | 175 | | | 16 | | | | | | | | | | |
| Leen de Vries | 135 | | | | 30 | | | | | | | | | |
| Marian de Vroomen-Overdiep | 469 | | | | | 30 | | | | | | | | |
| Haije de Wit | 68 | | 25 | | | | | | | | | | | |
| Tonnie Wouters-van Broekhoven | 304 | | | | | | | | | | | 18 | 18 | |
| Spencer Zeegers | 182 | | | | | | | | | | | 26 | 26 | |
| Geert Zondag | 77 | | 21 | | | | | | | | | | | |
| Peter van Zutphen | 509 | | | | | | | | | | | | | 16 |

== 7: Reformed Political Party ==
Candidate list for the Reformed Political Party
| Number | Candidate | Votes | Result |
|---|---|---|---|
| 1 | Bas van der Vlies | 147,030 | Elected |
| 2 | Kees van der Staaij | 7,107 | Elected |
| 3 | Elbert Dijkgraaf | 2,334 | |
| 4 | Eppie Klein | 1,071 | |
| 5 | Arie Noordergraaf | 520 | |
| 6 | Diederik van Dijk | 518 | |
| 7 | A.G. Bregman | 289 | |
| 8 | A. Weggeman | 145 | |
| 9 | P.C. den Uil | 224 | |
| 10 | Hans Tanis | 229 | |
| 11 | Gerrit Holdijk | 310 | |
| 12 | George van Heukelom | 238 | |
| 13 | M. Bogerd | 329 | |
| 14 | J.D. Heijkamp | 199 | |
| 15 | Roelof Bisschop | 326 | |
| 16 | Adri van Heteren | 294 | |
| 17 | F.W. den Boef | 81 | |
| 18 | Dirk-Jan Budding | 451 | |
| 19 | L. Bolier | 81 | |
| 20 | C.S.L. Janse | 28 | |
| 21 | L.G.I. Barth | 85 | |
| 22 | W. Fieret | 132 | |
| 23 | A.P. de Jong | 82 | |
| 24 | Peter Schalk | 100 | |
| 25 | A. Beens | 338 | |
| 26 | Bert Scholten | 234 | |
| 27 | J. Slingerland | 70 | |
| 28 | Tj. de Jong | 293 | |
| 29 | M.J. Kater | 128 | |
| 30 | Peter Zevenbergen | 296 | |

== 8: United Seniors Party ==
Candidate list for United Seniors Party
| Position | Candidate | Votes | Result |
|---|---|---|---|
| 1 | Anneke Smit-Boerma | 31,641 | |
| 2 | Piet Bruijstens | 1,492 | |
| 3 | Francien den Toom-’t Hart | 685 | |
| 4 | Kees Kruijmer | 411 | |
| 5 | Floor Le Hane | 835 | |
| 6 | Ad van ‘t Geloof | 342 | |
| 7 | Jan Boerland | 355 | |
| 8 | Rita Santoro-van Halm Braam | 310 | |
| 9 | Tineke van der Wal-Vriezen | 300 | |
| 10 | Wim Hendriks | 202 | |
| 11 | Martien van Bakel | 179 | |
| 12 | Rien de Vreugd | 215 | |
| 13 | Anton Fock van Coppenaal | 217 | |
| 14 | Aad Turkenburg | 253 | |
| 15 | Herman Troost | 180 | |
| 16 | Jantine Slootheer-Dijkstra | 85 | |
| 17 | Jacques Hendriks | 77 | |
| 18–28 | Regional candidates | | |
| Total | | | |

=== Regional candidates ===
Regional candidates for United Seniors Party
| Candidate | Votes | Result | Position per electoral district | |
| Candidate | Votes | Result | Other | Utrecht |
|---|---|---|---|---|
| Margriet Algra | 26 | | | 18 |
| Arie Dubbelman | 175 | | 22 | 24 |
| Ties Hogenbirk-Padding | 46 | | 25 | 27 |
| An de Jonge-van Geest | 134 | | 19 | 20 |
| Els van Leeuwen-Veldhuizen | 94 | | 18 | 19 |
| Winny Lemette | 64 | | 21 | 22 |
| Elly Middelburg-Hardijzer | 90 | | 23 | 25 |
| Diny Out-Gerstel | 399 | | 26 | 28 |
| Ellen van der Ploeg | 138 | | 24 | 26 |
| Henny Quispel-Fonteijn Kuijpers | 58 | | 20 | 21 |
| Renée Soute | 2 | | | 23 |

== 9: New Middle Party ==
Candidate list for New Middle Party
| Position | Candidate | Votes | Result |
|---|---|---|---|
| 1 | Jos Bron | 1,113 | |
| 2 | Martin Dessing | 137 | |
| 3 | Theo Jansen | 119 | |
| 4 | Philip de Lange | 65 | |
| 5 | Harry Brakel | 79 | |
| 6 | Arjan Gelder | 63 | |
| 7 | Mohamed El Johari | 210 | |
| 8 | Gerard van Dorp | 61 | |
| 9–15 | Regional candidates | | |
| Total | | | |

=== Regional candidates ===
Regional candidates for New Middle Party
| Candidate | Votes | Result | Position per electoral district | |
| Candidate | Votes | Result | Other | Maastricht |
|---|---|---|---|---|
| Hans Beukema | 64 | | 9 | |
| Roy Hermans jr | 47 | | 12 | 10 |
| Yvonne van der Meulen | 78 | | 10 | |
| Albert Samseer | 35 | | 11 | 9 |
| Henriëtte Schulzgen | 35 | | 14 | 12 |
| Dale Tan | 36 | | 13 | 11 |
| Joke van Wattingen-Bron | 163 | | 15 | 13 |

== 10: Party of the Future ==
Candidate list for Party of the Future
| Position | Candidate | Votes | Result |
|---|---|---|---|
| 1 | Johan Vlemmix | 4,558 | |
| 2 | M.J.P. Tijssen | 305 | |
| 3 | J.J.G. Prinssen | 228 | |
| 4 | R.A.A.M. Hugens | 99 | |
| 5 | K.A. van de Kuinder | 96 | |
| 6 | H.J.J. Hartmann | 160 | |
| 7 | Rik Wamelink | 83 | |
| 8 | M.J.F. Rijkers | 82 | |
| 9 | E. de Jong | 101 | |
| 10 | W.G.J. Plat | 101 | |
| 11 | R. Scheiuit | 205 | |
| 12 | H.T.J. te Wildt | 66 | |
| 13 | A.J.A. Rennenberg | 309 | |
| Total | | | |

== 11: Free Indian Party and Elderly Union ==
Candidate list for Free Indian Party and Elderly Union
| Position | Candidate | Votes | Result |
|---|---|---|---|
| 1 | R.O. Koop | 5,501 | |
| 2 | B.A. Otten | 499 | |
| 3 | M.T. Aarts | 216 | |
| 4 | I.J. de Frétes | 1,033 | |
| 5 | H.W.G. van Leeuwen | 136 | |
| 6 | E.P. Esajas | 447 | |
| 7 | M.N.M. Schardijn | 260 | |
| 8 | R. Daimin | 84 | |
| 9 | L.E. Felix | 188 | |
| 10–30 | Regional candidates | | |
| Total | | | |

=== Regional candidates ===
Regional candidates for Free Indian Party and Elderly Union
| Candidate | Votes | Result | Position per electoral district | | | | |
| Candidate | Votes | Result | Groningen | Nijmegen | Arnhem, Dordrecht | Utrecht | Leiden |
|---|---|---|---|---|---|---|---|
| L.N. Arends | 36 | | 25 | 22 | 21 | 23 | 22 |
| E.R. Blaauw | 430 | | 30 | 27 | 26 | 28 | 26 |
| S.M.C. Broek - de Jong | 15 | | 23 | | | | |
| J.T. Couwenberg-Trouerbach | 114 | | 17 | 16 | 15 | 16 | 16 |
| P.P.W. Cuijpers | 25 | | 28 | 25 | 24 | 26 | |
| R.H. Doop-Kopetzky | 51 | | 21 | 19 | 18 | 20 | 19 |
| E.R. Frans | 58 | | 13 | 13 | 12 | 13 | 13 |
| A. van Geerenstein-van Bedaf | 15 | | 16 | | | | |
| R.G.D.T. van Huet | | | 29 | 26 | 25 | 27 | 25 |
| J.A.W. Inslegers | 35 | | 14 | 14 | 13 | 14 | 14 |
| C.D. Kessing | 66 | | 24 | 21 | 20 | 22 | 21 |
| J. Koopmans | 20 | | 20 | | | 19 | |
| R.F. Mellenbergh | 81 | | 15 | 15 | 14 | 15 | 15 |
| L. Nazloomian | | | 12 | 12 | 11 | 12 | 12 |
| E.C. Purvis | 82 | | 19 | 18 | 17 | 18 | 18 |
| H. Remeeus | 142 | | 26 | 23 | 22 | 24 | 23 |
| I.E.A. Saueressig | 61 | | 22 | 20 | 19 | 21 | 20 |
| J.H. Schoeman | 24 | | 27 | 24 | 23 | 25 | 24 |
| H.M. Schupp | 151 | | 10 | 10 | | 10 | 10 |
| F.I. Siegers-Last | 56 | | 18 | 17 | 16 | 17 | 17 |
| J.I. Struyk | 87 | | 11 | 11 | 10 | 11 | 11 |

== 12: Christian Union ==
Candidate list for Christian Union
| Position | Candidate | Votes | Result |
|---|---|---|---|
| 1 | Kars Veling | 160,966 | Elected |
| 2 | Leen van Dijke | 19,187 | Elected |
| 3 | André Rouvoet | 12,221 | Elected |
| 4 | Eimert van Middelkoop | 6,531 | Elected |
| 5 | Dick Stellingwerf | 2,188 | |
| 6 | Arie Slob | 2,986 | Replacement |
| 7 | Tineke Huizinga-Heringa | 19,797 | |
| 8 | Marien Bikker | 576 | |
| 9 | Eise van der Sluis | 338 | |
| 10 | Tijmen Duijst | | |
| 11 | Annette van Kalkeren | | |
| 12 | Olaf van Dijk | 496 | |
| 13 | Herman Timmermans | 230 | |
| 14 | Flora Lagerwerf-Vergunst | 312 | |
| 15 | Marjan Haak-Griffioen | 401 | |
| 16 | Roel Kuiper | 226 | |
| 17 | David de Jong | 712 | |
| 18 | Gerdien Rots | 341 | |
| 19 | Koen de Snoo | 131 | |
| 20 | Joël Voordewind | 798 | |
| 26 | Meindert Leerling | | |
| 27 | Janco Cnossen | 98 | |
| 28 | Willem Ouweneel | 3,879 | |
| 29 | Joop Alssema | 204 | |
| 30 | Dick Schutte | 1,055 | |
| Total | | | |

== 13: Durable Netherlands ==
Candidate list for Durable Netherlands
| Position | Candidate | Votes | Result |
|---|---|---|---|
| 1 | Seyfi Özgüzel | 5,009 | |
| 2 | Huib Poortman | 364 | |
| 3 | Cengiz Alkiliç | 358 | |
| 4 | Djoel Bhoendie | 1,029 | |
| 5 | Ronald Zwiers | 87 | |
| 6 | Manuel Kneepkens | 109 | |
| 7 | Nuran Özan | 301 | |
| 8 | Hans Goosen | 40 | |
| 9 | Mehmet Sagsu | 462 | |
| 10 | Brahim Richelieu | 75 | |
| 11 | Douglas Anasagasti | 41 | |
| 12 | Jan Haanstra | 57 | |
| 13 | Abdel Abali | 98 | |
| 14 | Rieke Stoel-Koning | 48 | |
| 15 | Mohamed Bouchtaoui | 71 | |
| 16 | Yvonne Lambers-Tekintürk | 53 | |
| 17 | Loveness Anaman | 109 | |
| 18 | Caroline Wagenaar | 36 | |
| 19 | Mathi Nagan | 558 | |
| 20 | Geert Portman | 37 | |
| 21 | Caty Aernoudts-Groosman | 25 | |
| 22 | Ton Besselink | 91 | |
| Total | | | |

== 14: Livable Netherlands ==
Candidate list for Livable Netherlands
| Position | Candidate | Votes | Result |
|---|---|---|---|
| 1 | Fred Teeven | 116,247 | Elected |
| 2-30 | Regional candidates | | |
| Total | | | |

=== Regional candidates ===
Regional candidates for Livable Netherlands
| Candidate | Votes | Result | Position per electoral district | | | | | | | | | | | | | | | | | | |
| Candidate | Votes | Result | Groningen | Leeuwarden | Assen | Zwolle | Lelystad | Nijmegen | Arnhem | Utrecht | Amsterdam | Haarlem | Den Helder | Den Haag | Rotterdam | Dordrecht | Leiden | Middelburg | Tilburg | Den Bosch | Maastricht |
|---|---|---|---|---|---|---|---|---|---|---|---|---|---|---|---|---|---|---|---|---|---|
| Jan van Aert | 66 | | | | | | | | | | | | | | | | | | | 10 | |
| Tarek Al-Chalabi | 32 | | | | | | | | | | | | | | | | 16 | | | | |
| John van Assendelft | 73 | | | | | | | | | | | | | | 5 | | | | | | |
| Evert-Jan van Beek | 25 | | | | | | | | | | | | | | | | 22 | | | | |
| Remco van den Berg | 108 | | | | | 6 | | | | | | | | | | | | | | | |
| Floris van den Berg van Saparoea | 20 | | | | | | | | | | 20 | | | | | | | | | | |
| Presley Bergen | 756 | | 22 | | 16 | 24 | 16 | 12 | | 14 | 5 | 17 | 20 | 20 | 20 | 22 | | 12 | 3 | 3 | 13 |
| Marten Bierman | 923 | | 30 | 29 | 28 | 30 | 30 | 29 | 30 | 28 | 29 | 29 | 30 | 29 | 29 | 30 | 30 | 30 | 30 | 30 | 29 |
| John de Blaey | 12 | | | | | | | | | | | | | 16 | | | | | | | |
| George Blom | 291 | | 24 | | | | | 2 | | 16 | | | | | | | | | | 24 | 14 |
| Arno Blommerde | 161 | | | | | | | | | | | | | | | | | 20 | 15 | | |
| Werner Bodenberger | 44 | | | | | | | | | | | | 14 | | | | | | | | |
| John Boersma | 38 | | | 16 | 9 | | | | | | | | | | | | | | | | |
| Gosse Bootsma | | | 10 | 2 | 6 | 11 | 3 | 23 | | | 13 | 20 | 17 | 22 | 23 | | 23 | | 23 | 21 | |
| Peter Boudewijn | | | 23 | | | 18 | 17 | 16 | | 20 | 19 | | 21 | 21 | 21 | 24 | 24 | 10 | 18 | 13 | 2 |
| Wil Bouwman | 51 | | | | | | | | | 15 | | | | | | | | | | | |
| Ed Braam | 47 | | | | | | | | | | | | | 15 | | 18 | | | | | |
| Lenneke van Brakel-van der Meer | 3,410 | | 5 | 5 | 5 | 5 | 5 | 5 | 5 | 5 | 4 | 5 | 5 | 5 | 2 | 3 | 4 | 5 | 5 | 5 | 5 |
| Hajo Brandt | 190 | | | 15 | | 4 | | | | | | | | | | | | | | | |
| Jacques Bron | 264 | | | | | | | | | | | | | 2 | 11 | 6 | 8 | | | | |
| Alexander Bruch | | | | | | | | | | | | 10 | | | | | | | | | |
| Han Bruin | 18 | | | | | | | | | | | | | | | | 20 | | | | |
| Frans Buitendijk | 81 | | | | | | | | | | | | | | | 15 | | | | | |
| Bert van den Burg | | | | | | | | | | | | | | 14 | | 10 | | | | | |
| Jef Burger | 518 | | 21 | 22 | 18 | 22 | 15 | 21 | | 19 | 22 | 24 | 19 | 10 | 14 | 5 | 2 | | | | |
| Gerard Cevat | 174 | | | | | | | | | | | | 4 | | | | | | | | |
| Ton Clarijs | | | | | | | | | | | | | | 11 | 10 | 4 | | | | | |
| Frank Cornelissen | 48 | | | | | 10 | | | | | | | | | | | | | | | |
| Wim Couwenberg | | | 25 | 24 | 23 | 25 | 25 | 24 | 25 | 22 | 24 | 25 | 25 | 24 | 6 | 25 | 11 | 25 | 25 | 25 | 24 |
| Jan Cuperij | 16 | | | | | | | 8 | | | | | | | | | | | | | |
| Vincent Dalmijn | 298 | | | | | | | | | 4 | | | | | | | | | | | |
| Annelou Dierickx-Bangert | 49 | | | | | | | | | | | 11 | 13 | | | | | | | | |
| Jos Doornhein | 50 | | | | | | | | | | | | | | | 13 | | | | | |
| Jochem den Dulk | 72 | | | | | | | | | | | | | | | | 10 | | | | |
| Willem van Eeden | 43 | | | | | | | | | | | | | | | | 15 | | | | |
| José Eljon | 48 | | | | | | | | 11 | | | | | | | | | | | | |
| Kees Everaars | 18 | | | | | | | | | | | | | | 9 | | | | | | |
| Paul Folgers | 69 | | | 13 | | 8 | | | | | | | | | | | | | | | |
| Peter Fonkert | 154 | | | | | | | | | | 3 | 16 | | | | | | | | | |
| Tineke Franssen | 43 | | | | | 9 | | | | | | 13 | | | | | | | | | |
| Mike Friedman | 229 | | | | | | 2 | | | | 18 | | | | | | | | 24 | | |
| Adrie Gaasbeek | 212 | | 11 | 12 | 4 | 15 | | | | | | | | | | | | 21 | | | 19 |
| Thom Geerlings | 12 | | | | | | | | | | | | | | | | 13 | | | | |
| Adriaan van Gennep | 25 | | | | | | | | | | | | | | 8 | | | | | | |
| Bert Gietelink | 51 | | | | | | | | | | | | | | | | | | 8 | | |
| Christiaan Gijtenbeek | 49 | | | | | | | | 20 | | | | | | | | | | | | |
| Ruud Grove | 337 | | 9 | 4 | 2 | 14 | 11 | | | | | | | | | 17 | | 14 | | | |
| George de Haan | 72 | | | | | | | | 10 | | 11 | | | | | | | | | | |
| Bas Hartkamp | 30 | | | | | | | | | | | | | | | | 9 | | | | |
| Ans Hartnagel | 72 | | | | | | | | | | | | | | | | 19 | | | | |
| Age Hartsuiker | 392 | | 8 | 3 | 11 | | | 11 | | | | | | | | | | | | | 21 |
| Arno Haye | 28 | | | | | | | | | | | 12 | | | | | | | | | |
| Piet Hermus | 63 | | | | | | | | | | | | | | | | | | 10 | | |
| Ber van den Heuvel | 666 | | | | | | | 17 | | | | | | | | | | 13 | | 16 | 3 |
| Tammy Hilhorst | 93 | | | | | | | | | | | | | 8 | | | 17 | | | | |
| Herman Hoedemaker | 41 | | | | | | | | | | | | | | | | | 8 | | | |
| Ingrid Hogenbirk | 893 | | 17 | 20 | 22 | | 12 | | | 17 | 2 | | 12 | 12 | 17 | 9 | | | 17 | 20 | 15 |
| Hans Hoolmans | 39 | | | | | | | | | | | | | | | | | | 11 | | |
| Koos Huijbregts | 96 | | | | | | | | | | | | | | | | | | 14 | 18 | |
| Leen IJdo | 231 | | | | | 12 | | | 4 | | | | | | | | | | | | |
| Margriet de Jager | | | 13 | 10 | 12 | 2 | 4 | 9 | 8 | 10 | 21 | | 22 | | 22 | 8 | 12 | 16 | 20 | 22 | 17 |
| Dick Jense | 1,027 | Elected | 20 | 21 | 17 | 23 | 14 | 20 | | 18 | 23 | | 18 | 9 | 15 | 2 | 6 | 9 | 22 | | |
| Aloysia Jetten | 667 | | 6 | | | | 21 | 13 | | 23 | 10 | | | | 13 | 12 | | 22 | 12 | 4 | 6 |
| Louis van der Kallen | 27 | | | | | | | | | | | | | | | | | 6 | | | |
| John van Keeken | 45 | | | | | | | | 15 | | | | | | | | | | | | |
| Erik van Kilsdonk | 398 | | 7 | 7 | 7 | 7 | 7 | 7 | 7 | 7 | 6 | 7 | 7 | 7 | 7 | 7 | 7 | 7 | 7 | 7 | 7 |
| Maurice Koopman | 615 | | 18 | 9 | 15 | 19 | 18 | 15 | | 2 | 9 | 21 | 9 | | 24 | | 25 | 15 | 13 | 19 | 16 |
| Paul Koot | 126 | | | | | | | | 6 | 11 | | | | | | 16 | | | | | |
| Willem van Kooten | 893 | | 29 | 28 | 27 | 29 | 29 | 28 | 29 | 27 | 28 | 28 | 29 | 28 | 28 | 29 | 29 | 29 | 29 | 29 | 28 |
| Fred Krauthausen | 390 | | | | | | | | | | | | | | | | | | | | 4 |
| Peter van der Laak | 147 | | | | | | | | | | | | | | | | | | | 14 | |
| John Leunisse | 235 | | | | | | | | | | | | | | | | | | 6 | 15 | |
| Peter Looman | 99 | | | | | | | | | | | | | | | | | | 9 | 17 | |
| Arno van der Louw | 46 | | | | | | | | 12 | | | | | | | | | | | | |
| George Lubben | 26 | | | | | | | | | | | | | | | | 14 | | | | |
| Ton Luiting | | | 26 | 25 | 24 | 26 | 26 | 25 | 26 | 24 | 25 | 26 | 26 | 25 | 25 | 26 | 26 | 26 | 26 | 26 | 25 |
| Toby Meijlink | 62 | | | | | | | | | | | | | | 4 | | | | | | |
| Martin van Meurs | 68 | | | | | | 20 | 3 | | | | | | | | | | | | | 22 |
| Aart-Jan Moerkerke | 91 | | | | | | | | | | | | | | | | 5 | | | | |
| Dion Mouwen | 100 | | | | | | | | | | | | | | | 11 | | | | | |
| Derk Munnik | 73 | | | | | | | | | | | 6 | 10 | | | | | | | | |
| Jan Nagel | 2,420 | | 28 | 27 | 26 | 28 | 28 | 27 | 28 | 26 | 27 | 2 | 28 | 27 | 27 | 28 | 28 | 28 | 28 | 28 | 27 |
| Dimp Nelemans | 660 | | 15 | 18 | 20 | 21 | 8 | 19 | 22 | 8 | 16 | 23 | 16 | 19 | 19 | 20 | 21 | 4 | 4 | 6 | 9 |
| Roel de Nijs | 56 | | | | | | | | | | | 18 | | | | | | | | | |
| Eric Oosterom | 277 | | | | | | | | | | | | | | | | | | | 8 | |
| Henk Willem Otten | 178 | | | | | | 23 | | 14 | 3 | | | | | | | | | | | |
| Wil Palmans | 314 | | | | | | | | | | | | | | | | | | | | 8 |
| Bas Pastoor | 21 | | | | | | | | | | | | | | | | 18 | | | | |
| David Pinto | 158 | | | | 13 | | 10 | | | 12 | | | 8 | | | | | | | | |
| Ebo van Pommeren | 121 | | 3 | 8 | 8 | 16 | | | | | | | | | | | | 17 | | | |
| Caspar Pompe | 49 | | | | | | | 6 | 24 | | | | | | | | | | | | 18 |
| Leo Poppelaars | 260 | | | | | | | | | | | | | | | | | 3 | | | |
| Koos van Rijkom | 38 | | | | | | | | | | | 19 | | | | | | | | | |
| Harald van Roekel | 40 | | | | | | | | 9 | | | | | | | | | | | | |
| Frederik Roerig | 247 | | 4 | | | | | | | | | | | | | | | | | | |
| Linda Roos | 269 | | | | | | | | | | 17 | 8 | | | | | | | | | |
| Hans Roos | 29 | | | | | | | | | | | 14 | | | | | | | | | |
| Hetty van Scheltinga-van ‘t Wout | 533 | | | | | | | | | | | | 3 | | | | | | | | |
| Fons Schirris | 496 | | | | | | 22 | 14 | | 6 | 8 | 9 | 2 | | | | | 24 | | | |
| Broos Schnetz | | | 27 | 26 | 25 | 27 | 27 | 26 | 27 | 25 | 26 | 27 | 27 | 26 | 26 | 27 | 27 | 27 | 27 | 27 | 26 |
| Paul Schrijvers | 69 | | | | | | | | 16 | | | | | | | | | | | | |
| Frans Schut | 795 | | 14 | 19 | 19 | 13 | 6 | 4 | 2 | 21 | 12 | 22 | 24 | 18 | 18 | 21 | | 23 | 21 | 23 | 23 |
| Daan Sloos | 234 | | | | | | | | | | | | | | | | 3 | | | | |
| Ton Smit | 242 | | | | | | | | | | | 4 | | | | | | | | | |
| Tom Smitsloo | 28 | | | | | | | | | | | | | 6 | | | | | | | |
| Bert Snel | 174 | | 19 | | 21 | | 13 | | | | 15 | 3 | | | | | | | | | |
| Marjolijn Spuijbroek-de Groot | 577 | | | | | | | | 3 | 13 | | | | | | | | | | | |
| Paul Steyn | 101 | | | | | | | | | | | | | 3 | | | | | | | |
| Pieter Stillebroer | 42 | | | | | | | | | | | | | 4 | | | | | | | |
| John Struijlaard | 164 | | | | | | | | | | | | | | 3 | | | 18 | | | |
| Johan Stuut | 224 | | | | | 3 | 24 | 18 | | | | | | | | | | | | | |
| Math Suppers | 229 | | | | | | | | | | | | | | | | | | | | 11 |
| Jos Tesselaar | 211 | | | | | | | | | | | | 6 | | | | | | | | |
| Herman Teuling | 55 | | | 6 | | | | | | | | | | | | | | | | | |
| Jacob Venker | 85 | | | | | | | | | | | | | | | | | 19 | | 9 | 10 |
| Chris Verbrugge | 52 | | | | | | | | 21 | | | | | | | | | | | | |
| Tjerk Westerterp | | | 12 | 17 | 14 | 20 | 9 | 10 | 13 | 9 | 7 | 15 | 15 | 17 | 16 | 19 | | 11 | 2 | 2 | 12 |
| Marien Weststrate | 413 | | 16 | 23 | | | 19 | 22 | 23 | | | | 23 | 23 | 12 | 23 | | 2 | 19 | 12 | 20 |
| Herman Wijlhuizen | | | 2 | 11 | 10 | 17 | | | | | 14 | | 11 | | | | | | | 11 | |
| Albert Wissink | 96 | | | | | | | | 19 | | | | | | | | | | | | |
| Jan Peter de Wit | 66 | | | | | | | | | | | | | 13 | | 14 | | | | | |
| Stef van Wunnik | 238 | | | | | | | | | | | | | | | | | | 16 | | |
| Ton van Zanten | 41 | | | | | | | | 17 | | | | | | | | | | | | |
| Aad Zwartepoorte | 149 | | | 14 | 3 | | | | | | | | | | | | | | | | |
| Dik Zwijnenburg | 44 | | | | | | | | 18 | | | | | | | | | | | | |

== 15: Pim Fortuyn List ==
Candidate list for Pim Fortuyn List
| Position | Candidate | Votes | Result |
|---|---|---|---|
| 1 | Pim Fortuijn | 1,358,942 | Elected |
| 2 | João Varela | 84,924 | Elected |
| 3 | Jim Janssen Van Raaij | 34,686 | Elected |
| 4 | Winny de Jong | 41,366 | Elected |
| 5 | Ferry Hoogendijk | 11,704 | Elected |
| 6 | Mat Herben | 37,299 | Elected |
| 7 | André Peperkoorn | 2,251 | Elected, but declined |
| 8 | Fred Schonewille | 1,223 | Elected |
| 9 | Vic Bonke | 1,099 | Elected |
| 10 | Fred Dekker | | Elected |
| 11 | Firouze Zeroual | | Elected |
| 12 | Milos Zvonar | 447 | Elected |
| 13 | Cor Eberhard | 1,070 | Elected |
| 14 | Gerlof Jukema | 1,352 | Elected |
| 15 | Philomena Bijlhout | 1,494 | Elected |
| 16 | Hans Smolders | 2,553 | Elected |
| 17 | Frits Palm | 624 | Elected |
| 18 | Harm Wiersma | 1,759 | Elected |
| 19 | Joost Eerdmans | 701 | Elected |
| 20 | Wien van den Brink | 13,387 | Elected |
| 21 | Olaf Stuger | 218 | Elected |
| 22 | Gerard van As | 652 | Elected |
| 23 | Ton Alblas | 371 | Elected |
| 24 | Jan van Ruiten | 454 | Elected |
| 25 | Theo de Graaf | | Elected |
| 26 | Harry Smulders | | Elected |
| 27 | Leon Geurts | 2,363 | Elected, but declined |
| 28 | Harry Wijnschenk | 877 | Replacement |
| 29–30 | Regional candidates | | |
| Total | | | |

=== Regional candidates ===
Regional candidates for Pim Fortuyn List
| Candidate | Votes | Result | Position per electoral district | | | | | | | | | | | | | | | | | |
| Candidate | Votes | Result | Groningen, Assen | Leeuwarden | Zwolle | Lelystad | Nijmegen | Arnhem | Utrecht | Amsterdam | Haarlem | Den Helder | Den Haag | Rotterdam | Dordrecht | Leiden | Middelburg | Tilburg | Den Bosch | Maastricht |
|---|---|---|---|---|---|---|---|---|---|---|---|---|---|---|---|---|---|---|---|---|
| Jan van Aartsen | 1,538 | | 30 | 30 | | | | | | | | | | | | 29 | | | | |
| Maurits Campert | 294 | | | | 29 | | | | | | | 30 | 30 | | | | | | | |
| Adri van Duijvenbode | 221 | | | | | | | | | | | | | | | | 29 | | | |
| André Frijters | 552 | | | | | | 30 | 29 | | | | | | | | | | | | |
| Egbert Jan Groenink | 257 | Replacement | 29 | | | | | | | | | | | | | | | | | |
| Ed Hendrich | 759 | | | | | | | | | | | | | | | | | | 29 | |
| Ade Jansen | 304 | | | | | | 29 | | | | | | | | | | | | | |
| Lindy Kom | 42 | | | | | | | | | | | | | | | | | 29 | | |
| Marianne Kromme | 192 | | | | | | | | 30 | | | | | | | | | | | |
| Cees van Leeuwen | 153 | | | | | | | | | | | | | | | | | | 30 | |
| Frans Lutz | 15 | | | | | | | | | | | 29 | | | | | | | | |
| Irena Pantelić | 917 | | | | 30 | 30 | | 30 | | 30 | 30 | | | 30 | 30 | | 30 | | | 30 |
| Dennis Salman | 816 | | | | | | | | | | | | | | | 30 | | | | |
| Jos Schefferlie | 222 | | | | | | | | | | | | | | 29 | | | | | |
| D.A.S. Schrok | 72 | | | | | | | | | | | | 29 | | | | | | | |
| Pierre Seeverens | 1,453 | | | | | | | | | | | | | | | | | | | 29 |
| Tjerk Sleeswijk Visser | 11 | | | | | 29 | | | | | | | | | | | | | | |
| Hein Spijker | 64 | | | | | | | | 29 | | | | | | | | | | | |
| Frits Tieleman | 307 | | | | | | | | | | 29 | | | | | | | | | |
| Gerben Uunk | 820 | | | | | | | | | 29 | | | | | | | | 30 | | |
| Willem van der Velden | 63 | Replacement | | | | | | | | | | | | 29 | | | | | | |
| Johan Wiersma | 185 | | | 29 | | | | | | | | | | | | | | | | |

== 17: Republican People's Party ==
Candidate list for Republican People's Party
| Position | Candidate | Votes | Result |
|---|---|---|---|
| 1 | John Gouweloos | 48 | |
| 2 | G.A.M. Schreuder | 5 | |
| 3 | R.N. Maria | 10 | |
| Total | | | |

== See also ==
- List of members of the House of Representatives of the Netherlands, 2002–2003

== Sources ==
- Kiesraad (15 May 2002). "Proces-verbaal zitting uitslag Tweede Kamerverkiezing 2002" (PDF) (in Dutch).
