= List of members of the House of Representatives of the Netherlands, 2006–2010 =

The List of members of the House of Representatives is the list of members of the House of Representatives of the Netherlands the Lower house of the States-General of the Netherlands. The members elected in the Dutch general election of 2006. There has been a sizable number of mutations since due to the particular nature of the Dutch constitutional system. New members are supplied from their party lists so the resignation of individual members' seats does not change the balance of power in the States-General of the Netherlands. The term started on 30 November 2006 and ended on 16 June 2010.

== Members ==
All members are sworn in at the start of the term, even if they are not new. Assumed office in this list therefore refers to the swearing in during this term, while all members are automatically considered to have left office at the end of the term.

Members of the House of Representatives of the Netherlands, 2006–2010
Name	Parliamentary group	Assumed office	Term end	Ref.
Ine Aasted-Madsen	CDA	13 May 2008	16 August 2008	
Ine Aasted-Madsen	CDA	3 September 2008	16 June 2010	
Ron Abel	SP	30 November 2006	9 April 2008	
Fleur Agema	PVV	30 November 2006	16 June 2010	
Nebahat Albayrak	PvdA	30 November 2006	21 February 2007	
Nebahat Albayrak	PvdA	12 May 2010	16 June 2010	
Rendert Algra	CDA	1 September 2009	16 June 2010	
Ed Anker	CU	1 March 2007	16 June 2010	
Charlie Aptroot	VVD	30 November 2006	16 June 2010	
Khadija Arib	PvdA	1 March 2007	16 June 2010	
Joop Atsma	CDA	30 November 2006	16 June 2010	
Naïma Azough	GL	30 November 2006	24 February 2009	
Naïma Azough	GL	17 June 2009	16 June 2010	
Hans van Baalen	VVD	30 November 2006	13 July 2009	
Jan Peter Balkenende	CDA	30 November 2006	21 February 2007	
Farshad Bashir	SP	15 January 2008	16 June 2010	
Willibrord van Beek	VVD	30 November 2006	16 June 2010	
Marianne Besselink	PvdA	30 November 2006	16 June 2010	
Eddy Bilder	CDA	1 March 2007	16 June 2010	
Jack Biskop	CDA	30 November 2006	16 June 2010	
Elly Blanksma-van den Heuvel	CDA	30 November 2006	16 June 2010	
Stef Blok	VVD	30 November 2006	16 June 2010	
Luuk Blom	PvdA	30 November 2006	16 June 2010	
Bas Jan van Bochove	CDA	30 November 2006	16 June 2010	
Arend Jan Boekestijn	VVD	30 November 2006	18 November 2009	
Jan Boelhouwer	PvdA	15 January 2008	16 June 2010	
Harry van Bommel	SP	30 November 2006	16 June 2010	
Wouter Bos	PvdA	30 November 2006	21 February 2007	
Martin Bosma	PVV	30 November 2006	16 June 2010	
Samira Bouchibti	PvdA	30 November 2006	16 June 2010	
Lea Bouwmeester	PvdA	30 November 2006	16 June 2010	
Hero Brinkman	PVV	30 November 2006	16 June 2010	
Han ten Broeke	VVD	30 November 2006	16 June 2010	
Brigitte van der Burg	VVD	30 November 2006	16 June 2010	
Jet Bussemaker	PvdA	30 November 2006	21 February 2007	
Wim van de Camp	CDA	30 November 2006	13 July 2009	
Coşkun Çörüz	CDA	30 November 2006	16 June 2010	
Ernst Cramer	CU	30 November 2006	16 June 2010	
Ferd Crone	PvdA	30 November 2006	19 November 2007	
Martijn van Dam	PvdA	30 November 2006	16 June 2010	
Staf Depla	PvdA	30 November 2006	11 May 2010	
Ineke Dezentjé Hamming-Bluemink	VVD	30 November 2006	16 June 2010	
Tofik Dibi	GL	30 November 2006	16 June 2010	
Tony van Dijck	PVV	30 November 2006	16 June 2010	
Jan Jacob van Dijk	CDA	30 November 2006	16 June 2010	
Jasper van Dijk	SP	30 November 2006	16 June 2010	
Marjo van Dijken	PvdA	1 March 2007	16 June 2010	
Sharon Dijksma	PvdA	30 November 2006	21 February 2007	
Jeroen Dijsselbloem	PvdA	30 November 2006	16 June 2010	
Isabelle Diks	GL	3 September 2008	20 December 2008	
Piet Hein Donner	CDA	30 November 2006	21 February 2007	
Wijnand Duyvendak	GL	30 November 2006	2 September 2008	
Angelien Eijsink	PvdA	30 November 2006	16 June 2010	
Ton Elias	VVD	18 December 2008	16 June 2010	
Nihat Eski	CDA	15 December 2009	16 June 2010	
Kathleen Ferrier	CDA	30 November 2006	16 June 2010	
Sietse Fritsma	PVV	30 November 2006	16 June 2010	
Pieter van Geel	CDA	30 November 2006	16 June 2010	
Karien van Gennip	CDA	30 November 2006	2 September 2008	
Ineke van Gent	GL	30 November 2006	16 June 2010	
Arda Gerkens	SP	30 November 2006	16 June 2010	
Henk van Gerven	SP	30 November 2006	16 June 2010	
Sharon Gesthuizen	SP	30 November 2006	16 June 2010	
Rosita van Gijlswijk	SP	30 November 2006	14 January 2008	
Chantal Gill'ard	PvdA	30 November 2006	8 February 2010	
Chantal Gill'ard	PvdA	1 June 2010	16 June 2010	
Dion Graus	PVV	30 November 2006	16 June 2010	
Laetitia Griffith	VVD	30 November 2006	16 June 2010	
Sybrand van Haersma Buma	CDA	30 November 2006	16 June 2010	
Femke Halsema	GL	30 November 2006	16 June 2010	
Boris van der Ham	D66	30 November 2006	16 June 2010	
Mariëtte Hamer	PvdA	30 November 2006	16 June 2010	
Mark Harbers	VVD	1 December 2009	16 June 2010	
Maarten Haverkamp	CDA	30 November 2006	16 June 2010	
Mathieu Heemelaar	GL	3 March 2009	16 June 2009	
Ton Heerts	PvdA	30 November 2006	16 June 2010	
Pierre Heijnen	PvdA	1 March 2007	16 June 2010	
Jos Hessels	CDA	30 November 2006	9 March 2009	
Ruud van Heugten	CDA	30 November 2006	10 December 2009	
Eddy van Hijum	CDA	30 November 2006	16 June 2010	
Maria van der Hoeven	CDA	30 November 2006	21 February 2007	
Jan ten Hoopen	CDA	30 November 2006	16 June 2010	
Tineke Huizinga-Heringa	CU	30 November 2006	21 February 2007	
Ewout Irrgang	SP	30 November 2006	16 June 2010	
Lutz Jacobi	PvdA	30 November 2006	16 June 2010	
Rikus Jager	CDA	30 November 2006	16 June 2010	
Paulus Jansen	SP	30 November 2006	16 June 2010	
Cisca Joldersma	CDA	30 November 2006	16 June 2010	
Corien Jonker	CDA	1 March 2007	16 June 2010	
Paul Kalma	PvdA	30 November 2006	16 June 2010	
Henk Kamp	VVD	30 November 2006	17 December 2008	
Agnes Kant	SP	30 November 2006	16 June 2010	
Sadet Karabulut	SP	30 November 2006	16 June 2010	
Cees van der Knaap	CDA	30 November 2006	21 February 2007	
Raymond Knops	CDA	1 March 2007	16 June 2010	
Bert Koenders	PvdA	30 November 2006	21 February 2007	
Ger Koopmans	CDA	30 November 2006	16 June 2010	
Ad Koppejan	CDA	30 November 2006	16 June 2010	
Jules Kortenhorst	CDA	30 November 2006	22 January 2008	
Roland Kortenhorst	CDA	30 November 2006	2 September 2008	
Fatma Koşer Kaya	D66	30 November 2006	16 June 2010	
Margot Kraneveldt	PvdA	1 March 2007	16 June 2010	
Paul de Krom	VVD	30 November 2006	16 June 2010	
Attje Kuiken	PvdA	30 November 2006	18 January 2010 (Note: Went on maternity leave)	
Attje Kuiken	PvdA	11 May 2010	16 June 2010	
Saskia Laaper	PvdA	19 January 2010	10 May 2010	
Marianne Langkamp	SP	30 November 2006	16 June 2010	
John Leerdam	PvdA	30 November 2006	16 June 2010	
Hans van Leeuwen	SP	30 November 2006	16 June 2010	
Renske Leijten	SP	30 November 2006	16 June 2010	
Paul Lempens	SP	30 November 2006	16 June 2010	
Patricia Linhard	PvdA	12 May 2009	16 June 2010	
Fons Luijben	SP	30 November 2006	16 June 2010	
Barry Madlener	PVV	30 November 2006	13 July 2009	
Jan Marijnissen	SP	30 November 2006	16 June 2010	
Jan Mastwijk	CDA	30 November 2006	16 June 2010	
Cees Meeuwis	VVD	1 September 2009	16 June 2010	
Anouchka van Miltenburg	VVD	30 November 2006	16 June 2010	
Richard de Mos	PVV	1 September 2009	16 June 2010	
Helma Neppérus	VVD	30 November 2006	16 June 2010	
Frans de Nerée tot Babberich	CDA	30 November 2006	16 June 2010	
Atzo Nicolaï	VVD	30 November 2006	16 June 2010	
Pieter Omtzigt	CDA	30 November 2006	16 June 2010	
Henk Jan Ormel	CDA	30 November 2006	16 June 2010	
Cynthia Ortega-Martijn	CU	30 November 2006	16 June 2010	
Esther Ouwehand	PvdD	30 November 2006	16 June 2010	
Marleen de Pater-van der Meer	CDA	30 November 2006	16 June 2010	
Alexander Pechtold	D66	30 November 2006	16 June 2010	
Mariko Peters	GL	30 November 2006	30 August 2008	
Mariko Peters	GL	21 December 2008	16 June 2010	
Hein Pieper	CDA	17 March 2009	16 June 2010	
Hugo Polderman	SP	30 November 2006	16 June 2010	
Remi Poppe	SP	30 November 2006	16 June 2010	
Ronald van Raak	SP	30 November 2006	16 June 2010	
Johan Remkes	VVD	30 November 2006	16 June 2010	
Lia Roefs	PvdA	30 November 2006	16 June 2010	
Emile Roemer	SP	30 November 2006	16 June 2010	
Nathalie de Rooij	SP	30 November 2006	31 December 2008	
Raymond de Roon	PVV	30 November 2006	16 June 2010	
Trix de Roos	SP	13 January 2009	16 June 2010	
André Rouvoet	CU	30 November 2006	21 February 2007	
Sander de Rouwe	CDA	1 March 2007	16 June 2010	
Mark Rutte	VVD	30 November 2006	16 June 2010	
Diederik Samsom	PvdA	30 November 2006	16 June 2010	
Jolande Sap	GL	2 September 2008	16 June 2010	
Janneke Schermers	CDA	30 November 2006	16 June 2010	
Jan Schinkelshoek	CDA	30 November 2006	16 June 2010	
Edith Schippers	VVD	30 November 2006	16 June 2010	
Annie Schreijer-Pierik	CDA	30 November 2006	16 June 2010	
Arie Slob	CU	30 November 2006	16 June 2010	
Pauline Smeets	PvdA	30 November 2006	16 June 2010	
Margreeth Smilde	CDA	23 January 2008	16 June 2010	
Manja Smits	SP	22 April 2008	16 June 2010	
Janneke Snijder-Hazelhoff	VVD	30 November 2006	16 June 2010	
Hans Spekman	PvdA	30 November 2006	16 June 2010	
Liesbeth Spies	CDA	30 November 2006	16 June 2010	
Kees van der Staaij	SGP	30 November 2006	16 June 2010	
Mirjam Sterk	CDA	30 November 2006	7 April 2008	
Mirjam Sterk	CDA	29 July 2008	16 June 2010	
Paul Tang	PvdA	1 March 2007	16 June 2010	
Fred Teeven	VVD	30 November 2006	16 June 2010	
Marianne Thieme	PvdD	30 November 2006	16 June 2010	
Jacques Tichelaar	PvdA	30 November 2006	30 April 2009	
Anja Timmer	PvdA	20 November 2007	16 June 2010	
Frans Timmermans	PvdA	30 November 2006	21 February 2007	
Madeleine van Toorenburg	CDA	1 March 2007	16 June 2010	
Sabine Uitslag	CDA	8 April 2008	28 July 2008	
Sabine Uitslag	CDA	3 September 2008	16 June 2010	
Paul Ulenbelt	SP	30 November 2006	16 June 2010	
Eeke van der Veen	PvdA	30 November 2006	16 June 2010	
Krista van Velzen	SP	30 November 2006	16 June 2010	
Kees Vendrik	GL	30 November 2006	16 June 2010	
Gerdi Verbeet	PvdA	30 November 2006	16 June 2010	
Gerda Verburg	CDA	30 November 2006	21 February 2007	
Rita Verdonk	VVD	30 November 2006	16 June 2010	
Rita Verdonk	Lid Verdonk (Note: Starting 14 September 2007)	30 November 2006	16 June 2010	
Maxime Verhagen	CDA	30 November 2006	21 February 2007	
Roos Vermeij	PvdA	30 November 2006	16 June 2010	
Antoinette Vietsch	CDA	1 March 2007	16 June 2010	
Bas van der Vlies	SGP	30 November 2006	16 June 2010	
Joël Voordewind	CU	30 November 2006	16 June 2010	
Mei Li Vos	PvdA	1 March 2007	16 June 2010	
Jan de Vries	CDA	30 November 2006	16 June 2010	
Nicolien van Vroonhoven-Kok	CDA	30 November 2006	26 April 2008	
Nicolien van Vroonhoven-Kok	CDA	17 August 2008	16 June 2010	
Harm Evert Waalkens	PvdA	30 November 2006	16 June 2010	
Frans Weekers	VVD	30 November 2006	16 June 2010	
Esmé Wiegman	CU	1 March 2007	16 June 2010	
Joop Wijn	CDA	30 November 2006	21 February 2007	
Geert Wilders	PVV	30 November 2006	16 June 2010	
Ans Willemse-van der Ploeg	CDA	1 March 2007	16 June 2010	
Jan de Wit	SP	30 November 2006	16 June 2010	
Agnes Wolbert	PvdA	30 November 2006	16 June 2010	
Aleid Wolfsen	PvdA	30 November 2006	31 December 2007	
Keklik Yücel	PvdA	9 February 2010	31 May 2010	
Halbe Zijlstra	VVD	30 November 2006	16 June 2010	

== See also ==
- List of candidates in the 2006 Dutch general election
