= Henk de Haan =

Dutch economist and politician (born 1941)

Member of the House of Representatives
- In office 3 December 1996 – 29 November 2006
- Preceded by: Wim Deetman

Personal details
- Born: Hendrik de Haan; 8 April 1941 (age 85) Nijmegen, Netherlands
- Party: Christian Democratic Appeal
- Children: 3
- Education: University of Groningen; KU Leuven
- Occupation: Economist; politician

Hendrik "Henk" de Haan (Dutch: [ˈɦɛŋk də ˈɦaːn]; born 8 April 1941) is a Dutch economist and politician of the Christian Democratic Appeal (CDA). He served as member of the House of Representatives from December 1996 until November 2006, while he was a professor at the University of Groningen.

== Education and academic career ==
De Haan was born in 1941 in Nijmegen, and he attended primary school in Neerbosch. He went to the Gemeentelijke Hogere Burgerschool in Nijmegen and the Rijks Hogere Burgerschool in Groningen before studying economic and econometrics at the University of Groningen from 1959 until 1966. De Haan received his doctorate from KU Leuven four years later.

He joined the academic staff of the University of Groningen's economics faculty in 1966, and he became a lecturer on international economic relations in 1971. He was appointed professor at the university two years later with the same specialization. As part of a United Nations expert group, he was tasked with investigating the "economic and social consequences of the arms race and of military expenditures". He sat on the CDA's foreign affairs expert committee, and he authored a 1989 position paper for the party's think tank on sanctions against South Africa during the apartheid era. He argued that change would only come if the United Kingdom and West Germany, two major trading partners, increased pressure on South Africa – something the Dutch government should advocate for. Additionally, De Haan had secondary positions as chair of the Hanze University of Applied Sciences and as board member of the Royal Tropical Institute, the Friesland Bank Association, and the Groningen Martini Hospital.

== Politics ==
After having moved to Lettelbert, he ran for the House of Representatives in the May 1994 general election as the CDA's 39th candidate. He was not elected, as his party won 34 seats. When Wim Deetman left the House to become mayor of The Hague, De Haan succeeded him on 3 December 1996, while staying on as professor. He was re-elected in 1998, 2002, and 2003, and he served as the CDA's spokesperson for foreign affairs, finances, economic affairs, and development cooperation. He was vice chair of the Committee for Finances (1998–2002), chair of the Committees for Foreign Affairs (2002–2006) and Economic Affairs (2006), and he was part of the House's delegation to the Parliamentary Assembly of the Organization for Security and Co-operation in Europe (OSCE). In May 2000, De Haan urged the government to prevent Greece from entering the eurozone, but his motion was defeated, being supported only by Christian parties. He had been critical of a European economic and monetary union, and he believed that Greece was misrepresenting the state of its public finances. His motion received renewed attention in the early 2010s, when Greek government debt was the highest of any eurozone country during the euro area crisis. De Haan's membership of the House ended on 29 November 2006, the year after he had left the University of Groningen, and he was appointed Knight of the Order of Orange-Nassau the same day. De Haan later served as chair of the Dutch Group Friends of a Free Iran.

When in July 2010 the parliamentary group of the CDA agreed to engage in talks to form a governing coalition with the right-wing populist Party for Freedom (PVV), De Haan voiced his opposition to such a cooperation. The resulting first Rutte cabinet that included the VVD and CDA received confidence and supply from the PVV.

== Personal life ==
De Haan got married in Groningen on 22 March 1966, and he has three children. He is a Protestant.

== Electoral history ==
Electoral history of Henk de Haan
Year	Body	Party	Pos.	Votes	Result		Ref.
Year	Body	Party	Pos.	Votes	Party seats	Individual	Ref.
1994	House of Representatives	Christian Democratic Appeal	39	410	34 / 150	Lost (Note: De Haan was appointed to the body later during the term due to a vacancy.)	
1998	House of Representatives	Christian Democratic Appeal	17	1,259	29 / 150	Won	
2002	House of Representatives	Christian Democratic Appeal	23	641	43 / 150	Won	
2003	House of Representatives	Christian Democratic Appeal	23	620	44 / 150	Won	

== Bibliography ==
- (1970) De toepassing van de dimensieanalyse op de econometrie (The application of dimensional analysis to econometrics)
- (1985) Economisch denken: Algemene economie voor het vwo (Economical thinking; with A.J. Bielderman)
- (1987) Economisch handelen: Algemene economie voor het havo en mbo (Economical behavior; with C.G. Bakker and A.J. Bielderman)
