= Fred Dekker (politician) =

Dutch doctor, cardiologist and politician

Member of the House of Representatives
- In office 2002–2003

Personal details
- Born: 5 February 1946 (age 80) Biervliet
- Party: Pim Fortuyn List
- Education: University of Amsterdam
- Occupation: Cardiologist, politician

Fred Dekker (5 March 1946) is a Dutch doctor, cardiologist, and former politician on behalf of the Pim Fortuyn List.

Dekker is a cardiologist and worked in Belgium and the Netherlands. He was elected to parliament as a member of the Pim Fortuyn List (LPF) at the 2002 Dutch general election, but lost his seat in 2003 and left politics after.
