= Frits Palm =

Politician

Member of the House of Representatives
- In office 23 May 2002 – 30 January 2003

Personal details
- Born: 30 January 1947 Singapore
- Died: 7 March 2011 (aged 64) Delft, Netherlands
- Party: Pim Fortuyn List
- Education: Erasmus University Rotterdam

Frederik Albert "Frits" Palm (born 1947 - died 2011) was a Dutch economist, civil servant and former politician for the Pim Fortuyn List in the House of Representatives from 2002 to 2003.

Before he was elected to parliament, Palm was the director of the Cabinet of Antillean Affairs. In parliament he focused on Foreign Affairs, European Affairs, Defense and Kingdom Relations. Palm was also second vice-president of the House of Representatives.
