= Peter van Heemst =

Dutch politician (born 1952)

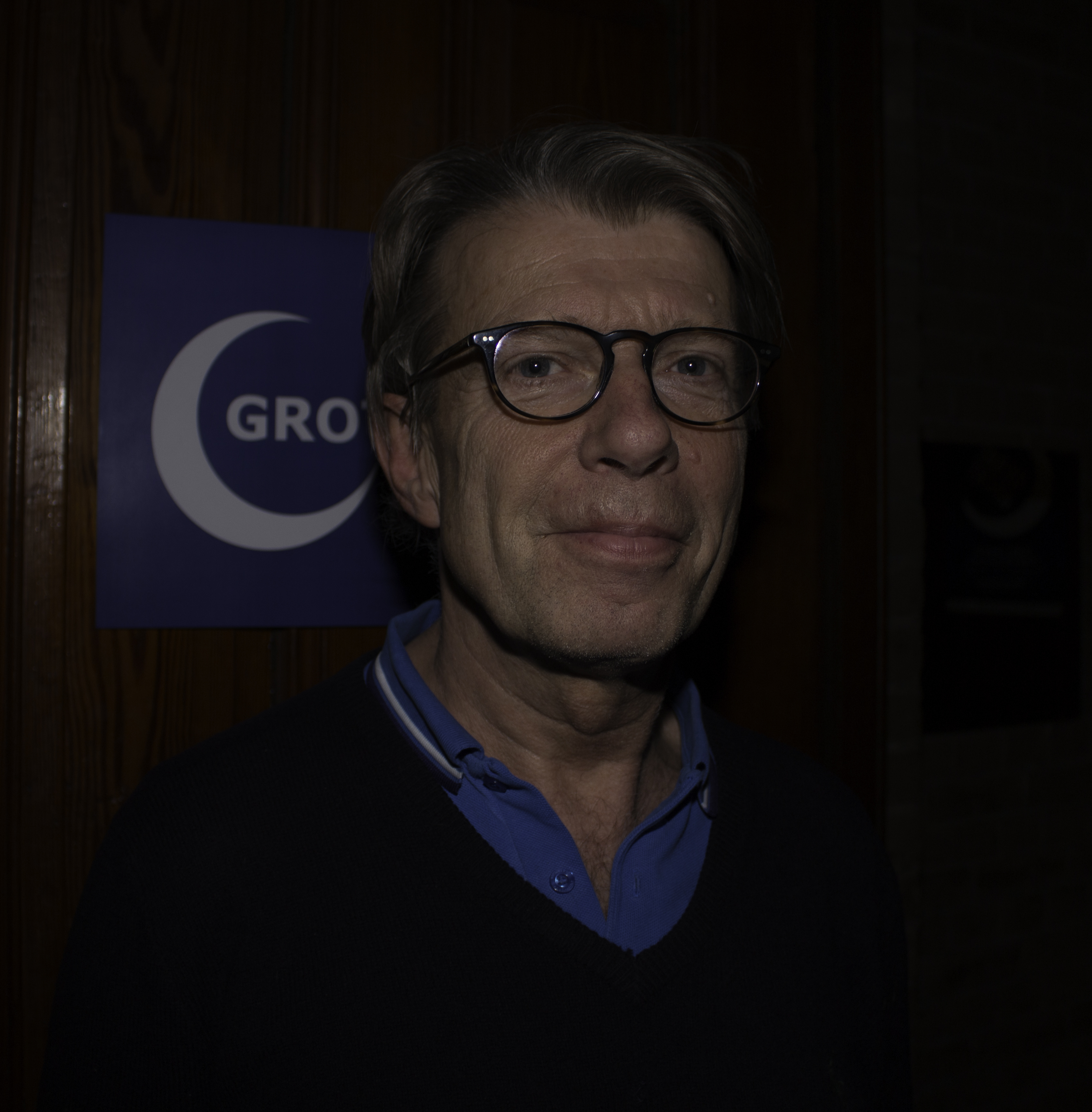
Peter van Heemst, 2014

Erik Peter van Heemst (born 10 July 1952 in Rotterdam) is a Dutch politician. From 1991 to 2006 he was a member of the House of Representatives for the Dutch Labour Party (PvdA). Since the municipal elections of 2006 he was the leader of the PvdA in Rotterdam, until his resignation on 27 March 2014.

Van Heemst studied law in Rotterdam, after which he became personal assistant to Hans Kombrink, member of parliament for the PvdA at that time. He was also a public housing staff member for the PvdA. From 1978 to 1991 he was a member of the provincial parliament of South Holland for the PvdA, and in 1987 he became a member of the provincial executive for urban renewal, recreation, nature and landscaping. In 1991 he became an MP for the PvdA.

When he left his post in 2006 to become leader of the PvdA in Rotterdam he was the longest-sitting member of the PvdA in the House of Representatives.

== House of Representatives ==
In 1996, Peter van Heemst, together with his Democrats 66 colleague Olga Scheltema, blocked the dividing of Rotterdam to create a city province. After that the Dutch government withdrew the entire plan.

Also in 1996 he helped create, together with fellow-townsman Benk Korthals (VVD) the 'Victor-act', which obliged owners of buildings in which drugs were being sold and/or used to renovate, redevelop and re-rent such buildings on the penalty of expropriation.

In the 2003 Peter van Heemst was the only one of the PvdA lower parliament members to oppose the compromise that the PvdA and the CDA agreed upon concerning the invasion of Iraq. He insisted that the PvdA broke off the ongoing negotiations between both parties regarding the formation of a new government.

== Rotterdam ==
In October 2005 van Heemst was chosen by his party members to lead the PvdA in the upcoming municipal elections in Rotterdam in 2006. He won the elections by receiving 60% of the votes. Other candidates were Dominic Schrijer, Matthijs van Muijen, and Bert Cremers. It was the first time that party members could directly choose their leader in a referendum.

On March 7, 2006, the PvdA and its leader van Heemst recorded a landslide victory in Rotterdam. In the municipal elections they recorded an increase in member seats from 11 to 18 (out of a total of 45). This was the biggest growth in the history of the PvdA in Rotterdam. A coalition with Livable Rotterdam (Leefbaar Rotterdam) (Marco Pastors' party, which received 14 member seats) was however out of the question due to Pastors' unwillingness. Therefore, van Heemst needed to create a coalition with the much smaller parties of CDA, VVD, and GreenLeft (GroenLinks). Van Heemst himself became head of the PvdA in the municipal council. On May 16, 2006, he resigned his commission as a member of the House of Representatives to be able to concentrate fully on his new function.
