= Hubert Bruls =

Dutch politician (born 1966)

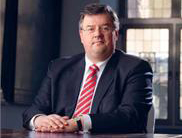
- Bruls in 2012

Mayor of Nijmegen
- Incumbent
- Assumed office 21 May 2012
- Preceded by: Thom de Graaf

Mayor of Venlo
- In office 1 October 2005 – 21 May 2012 (Note: Acting: 1 January 2010 – 1 July 2010)
- Preceded by: Wim Dijkstra
- Succeeded by: Antoin Scholten

Member of the House of Representatives
- In office 23 May 2002 – 11 October 2005

Alderman of Nijmegen
- In office 28 April 1999 – 24 April 2002

Municipal councillor of Nijmegen
- In office 14 April 1998 – 23 May 2002

Personal details
- Born: 6 February 1966 (age 60) Nuth, Netherlands
- Party: Christian Democratic Appeal
- Education: Radboud University Nijmegen

Hubertus Maria Franciscus "Hubert" Bruls (born 6 February 1966) is a Dutch politician who has served as Mayor of Nijmegen since 2012. A member of the Christian Democratic Appeal (CDA), he has also served as chairman of the Dutch Security Council since 2016.

== Early life ==
Bruls attended the former Bisschoppelijk College in Sittard – a gymnasium, the highest level of Dutch secondary education. He then studied political science at Radboud University Nijmegen, before working for the trade union NOVON/ABVAKABO. From 1998, he served as a member of the municipal council of Nijmegen and later an alderman in its municipal executive.

== Career ==
Mayor Bruls hosting and biking with King Willem-Alexander in Nijmegen in 2017

Bruls has held the mayorship of Nijmegen since May 2012, with the city's municipal council approving a second six-year term in 2018, and a third six-year term from 2024.

He is also ex officio chairman of the South Gelderland safety region, as well as, since 2016, chairman of the Security Council (Veiligheidsberaad), which encompasses the 25 Dutch safety regions. In this last role he was the main liaison between the Minister of Health and the safety regions during the COVID-19 pandemic. He currently also serves as deputy chairman of the Association of Netherlands Municipalities (VNG) under the leadership of chairman and The Hague Mayor Jan van Zanen.

Before becoming Mayor of Nijmegen Bruls was a member of the House of Representatives (2002–2005) and Mayor of Venlo (2005–2012).

== Personal life ==
Bruls is married and has two daughters.
