= Bart van Winsen =

Dutch politician

Bart Piet Jozef van Winsen (born 27 August 1943 in Lochem) is a former Dutch politician for the Christian Democratic Appeal (Christen-Democratisch Appèl).

He was a member of the municipal council of Haaksbergen from 1982 to 2002, and also an alderman of this Twente municipality from 1986 to 2002. Afterwards he was an MP from 2002 to 2006.

Van Winsen studied history at Utrecht University and political science at Radboud University Nijmegen. He worked as a teacher.
