= Piet de Ruiter =

Dutch politician

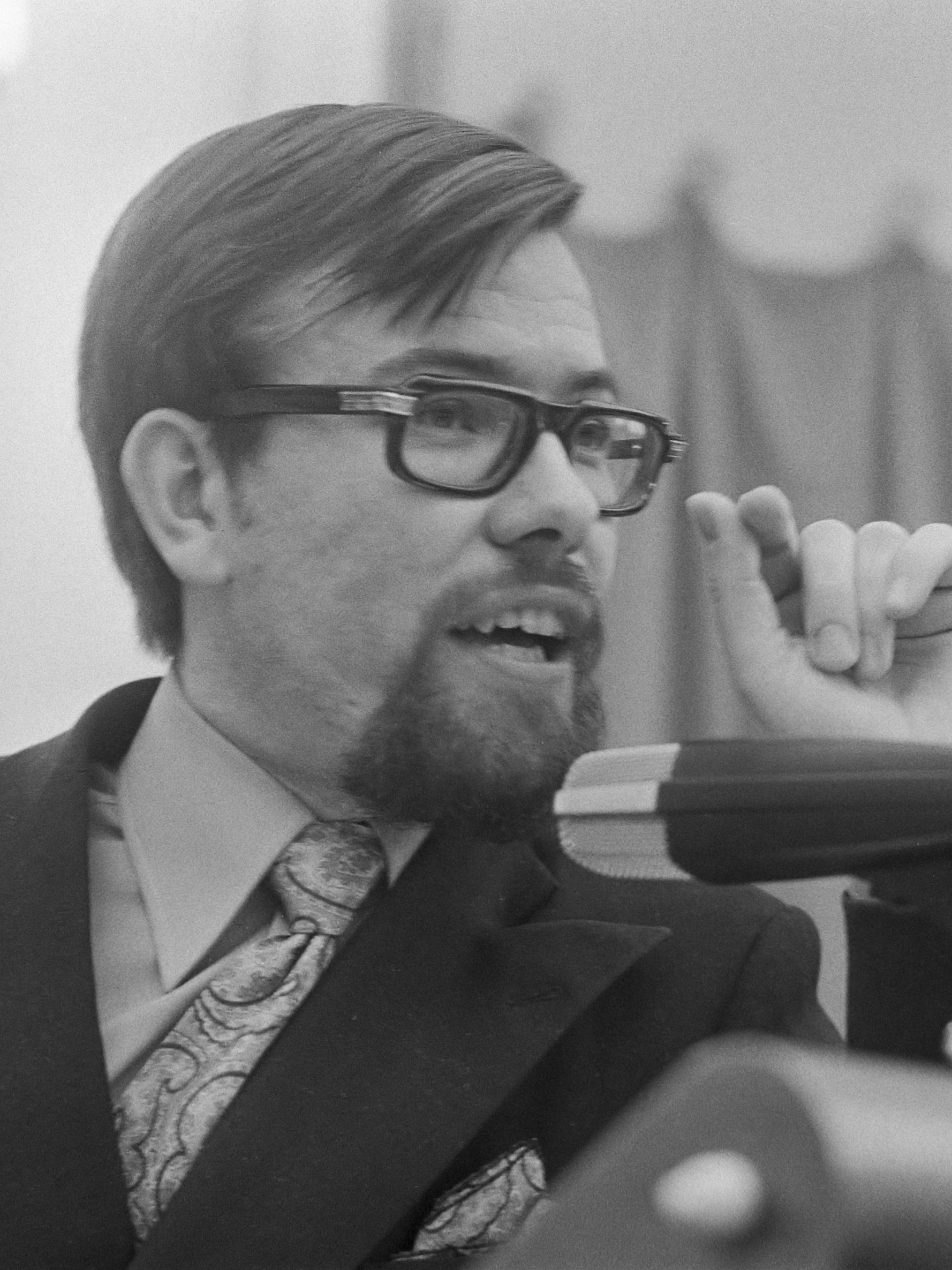
- Piet de Ruiter (1971)

Member of the House of Representatives
- In office 11 May 1971 – 1 February 1976

Personal details
- Born: 23 April 1939 Schiedam, Netherlands
- Died: 15 August 2014 (aged 75) Capelle aan den IJssel, Netherlands
- Party: Labour Party

Piet Arie de Ruiter (23 April 1939 – 15 August 2014) was a Dutch politician. He served as a member of the House of Representatives of the Netherlands between 1971 and 1976 for the Labour Party. He also served on the Public Body Rijnmond.

De Ruiter was born in Schiedam, in the late 1960s he served in the municipal council of Krimpen aan den IJssel. In 1965 he finished his study of economy at the Nederlandse Economische Hogeschool. He was editor of the magazine Economisch-Statistische Berichten (English: Economic-Statistic Messages) between 1965 and 1971. In 1970 he was elected to the council of the Public Body Rijnmond, he was elected there a further three times until 1982. Between 1976 and 1980 he held the executive portfolio for economic affairs, utilities and education in the Body. De Ruiter served as a member of the House of Representatives of the Netherlands between 1971 and 1976 for the Labour Party. After his time at the House of Representatives and Public Body Rijnmond he served in economic functions at the Ministry of Economic Affairs and municipality of Rotterdam. In this capacity he earned the title Port Personality of the Year 1983, concerning the Port of Rotterdam. He earned this title for his 1,5 year work in resolving a dispute between employers and employees in the port. He died on 15 August 2014 in Capelle aan den IJssel.
