= Jan van Ruiten =

Dutch businessman and politician

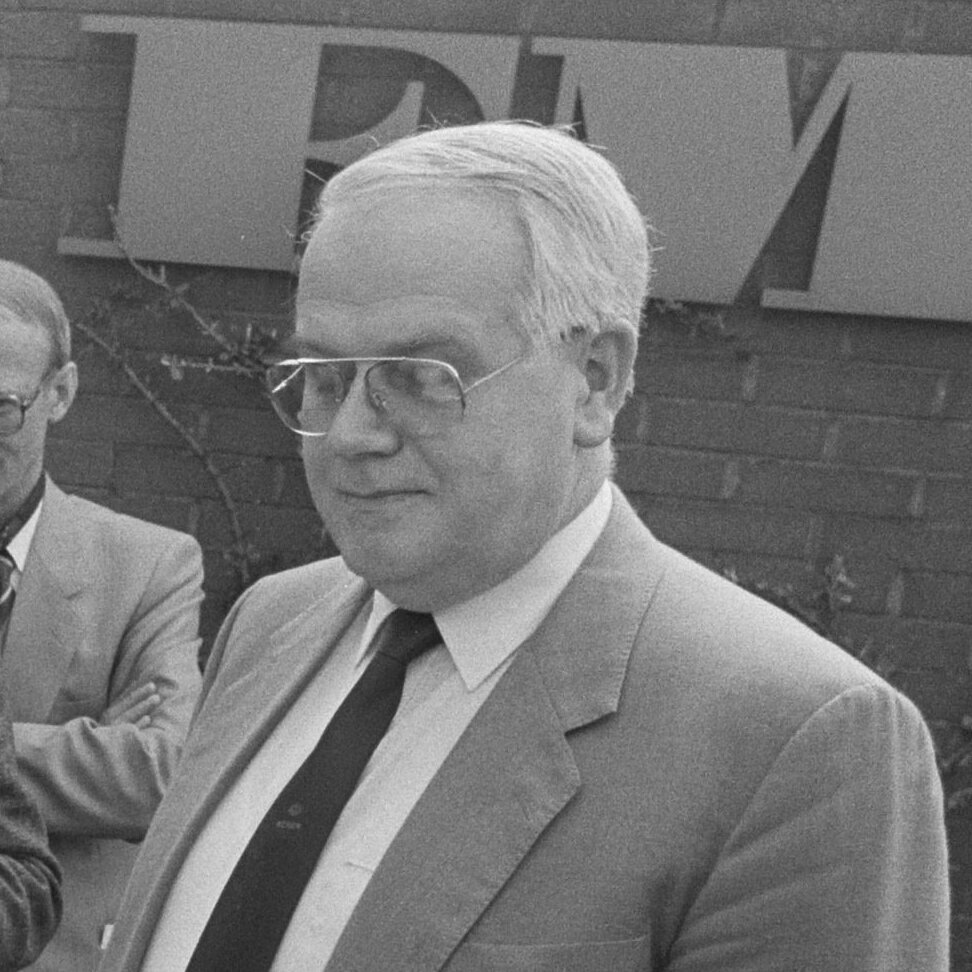
- 1985 as vice-chair of FME-CMW

Member of the House of Representatives
- In office 23 May 2002 – 30 January 2003

Personal details
- Born: 23 March 1931 Gouda, Netherlands
- Died: 26 September 2016 (aged 85) Sneek, Netherlands
- Party: Pim Fortuyn List
- Occupation: Businessman

Johannes Hendricus Simon "Jan" van Ruiten (23 March 1931 – 26 September 2016) was a Dutch businessman and politician. He served in the House of Representatives for the Pim Fortuyn List (LPF) from 23 May 2002, until 30 January 2003.

== Early life ==
Van Ruiten was born in Gouda on 23 March 1931.

== Professional career ==
He studied to become a merchant navy officer and worked in the maritime sector until 1960. He then held jobs as export employee, purchaser, and sales manager. Between 1971 and 1991, he was director of several companies.

He was a member of the House of Representatives for the Pim Fortuyn List (LPF) from 23 May 2002, until 30 January 2003. In October 2002, he was elected second deputy parliamentary group leader. During his time in the House van Ruiten was one of three LPF members over 65 years old, in a time when this was quite rare.

Van Ruiten was an Officer of the Order of Orange-Nassau.

== Death ==
He died in Sneek on 26 September 2016.
