= Harry Smulders =

Dutch banker and politician

Member of the House of Representatives
- In office 15 May 2002 – 2003

Personal details
- Born: Henricus Josephus Clemens Smulders; 1942 (age 83–84) Tilburg
- Party: Pim Fortuyn List
- Occupation: Politician, banker, businessman

Henricus Josephus Clemens Smulders (born 17 October 1942, Tilburg) is a Dutch entrepreneur, banker and former politician on behalf of the Pim Fortuyn List.

Smulders was a sailor with the merchant navy and then worked for the Nedlloyd shipping company. He later became a banker and business consultant.

Smulders was elected to the Member of the House of Representatives during the 2002 Dutch general election for the Pim Fortuyn List (LPF) party. In parliament, he was a member of the parliamentary inquiry into construction fraud. During the inquiry, he sometimes clearly showed his annoyance about the abuses in the construction industry. After Smulders' term in parliament ended, he stood for the Senate in 2003 and again on the LPF's list during the 2004 European Parliament election but was unsuccessful in both.
