= Ton Alblas =

Dutch politician

Member of the House of Representatives
- In office 23 May 2002 – 30 January 2003

Personal details
- Born: 24 May 1940 Barcelona, Spain
- Died: 21 August 2015 (aged 75) Leiden, Netherlands
- Party: Pim Fortuyn List
- Education: Delft University of Technology

Tonny "Ton" Alblas (24 May 1940 – 21 August 2015) was a Dutch politician, he served as member of the House of Representatives between 2002 and 2003 for the Pim Fortuyn List.

== Career ==
Alblas was born on 24 May 1940 in Barcelona, Spain. He completed his Hogere Burgerschool education in Eindhoven and Harderwijk. Alblas studied urban planning at the Delft University of Technology until 1972. He subsequently worked as civil servant for the Ministry of Transport, Public Works and Water Management until 1995. Afterwards Alblas worked as an independent advisor until 2000.

For the 2002 parliamentary elections Alblas was placed as number 21 on the party list for the Pim Fortuyn List. He gained a seat in the House of Representatives and was a member between 23 May 2002 and 30 January 2003. Shortly after becoming member Alblas hit a photojournalist after a heated Pim Fortuyn List fraction debate. Alblas promised to compensate any damages. Only a couple of months after the elections, the government, which included the Pim Fortuyn List, fell. In the subsequent 2003 elections Alblas was not re-elected. He decided to retire afterwards.

In the last years of his life Alblas was an advisor to the Leefbaar Leiden party, a local party in Leiden. During this period he advised Leefbaar Leiden on how to protest against a planned Islamic centre.

Alblas died on 21 August 2015 in Leiden, aged 75.
