= Ali Lazrak =

Dutch politician

Ali Lazrak (16 January 1948 – 14 June 2016) was a Dutch politician. He was elected to the House of Representatives in 2002 as a member of the Socialist Party. He left the party in February 2004, and served the rest of his term as an independent.

Lazrak died of lung cancer in 2016, at the age of 68.
