= Theo Rietkerk =

Dutch politician

Member of the Senate
- Incumbent
- Assumed office 11 June 2019

Member of the House of Representatives
- In office 19 May 1998 – 21 May 2003

Personal details
- Born: Theodoor Wolframp Rietkerk; 18 October 1962 (age 64) Goes, Netherlands
- Party: CDA (from 1993)
- Children: 4
- Education: Open University of the Netherlands (1990–1996)

Theodoor Wolframp "Theo" Rietkerk (born 18 October 1962) is a Dutch politician for the Christian Democratic Appeal (CDA). He is a member of the Dutch Senate since 2019, having previously served in the House of Representatives from 1998 to 2003 and the provincial executive of Overijssel from 2003 to 2014.

== Early life and career ==
Theo Rietkerk was born on 18 October 1962 in Goes. His father was a prominent member of the Reformatory Political Federation (RPF) who served as mayor of Genemuiden until 2000. After attending secondary school in Kampen, Rietkerk followed first an economic and legal course from 1981 to 1984 and then trained to become a civil servant from 1986 to 1989 at two colleges in Zwolle. He also studied public administration and law at the Open University of the Netherlands from 1990 to 1996.

Rietkerk began his career as a project assistant at the Ministry of Economic Affairs from 1984 to 1985, after which he worked as a policy and legal expert and project leader for the province of Overijssel on matters including the environment and rural renewal in the late 1980s and 1990s. From 2007 to 2019, Rietkerk was a member and later chairperson of the supervisory council of homeowners' association Vereniging Eigen Huis. Since 2014, Rietkerk has been the chairperson of the Landstede Groep, an association of secondary schools, since November 2014.

== Political career ==
Although Rietkerk had grown up in a family which supported the RPF, Rietkerk joined the Christian Democratic Appeal (CDA) after becoming attracted to the political thought of Abraham Kuyper. He first became active for the party on a local level, serving as secretary of the local CDA branch in Kampen from 1994 to 1998. He has continued to be active in various party commissions on the local and national level, for instance helping draft the CDA's platform from 2006 to 2007. Rietkerk was first elected to the House of Representatives in the 1998 Dutch general election. As an MP, Rietkerk was the CDA's spokesperson on public safety and policing, and was secretary of the CDA parliamentary group. He also sought to return the CDA to its Christian roots on social issues, especially on issues of medical ethics. In 2003, Rietkerk left the House of Representatives, citing a desire to spend more time with his family.

That same year, Rietkerk became a member of the provincial executive of Overijssel, where he was responsible for spatial planning, housing and the environment from 2003 to 2011 and for economic affairs, energy, tourism and recreation, government personnel and the IJssel delta from 2011 to 2014. He was also a member of the Provincial Council of Overijssel for two short periods in 2007 and 2011.

In 2019, Rietkerk returned to national politics and was chosen as a member of the Senate. As a senator, Rietkerk has primarily focused on (water) infrastructure. In 2022, Rietkerk was one of four CDA senators to vote against the abolition of the mandatory waiting period for abortion.

== Personal life ==
Rietkerk was married on 20 June 1986 in Kampen. He has four children.

Rietkerk was a member of the Netherlands Reformed Churches, and has been active for the church as a youth leader in Kampen.
