= Fred Schonewille =

Dutch lawyer, lecturer and politician

Personal details
- Born: 3 March 1969 (age 57) Assen
- Party: Pim Fortuyn List
- Education: University of Leiden, University of Stellenbosch
- Profession: Politician, lawyer, academic

Fred Schonewille (born 3 March 1969) is a Dutch lawyer, lecturer and former politician.

Schonewille studied at the University of Leiden and the University of Stellenbosch in South Africa. From 23 May 2002 to 30 January 2003 he was a Member of Parliament for the Pim Fortuyn List in the House of Representatives. He later joined the proposed List New Politics party founded by Herman Heinsbroek for the 2003 election which ultimately did not stand. Following his political career, Schonewille has worked as an assistant professor at Utrecht University and as a columnist for De Volkskrant.
