= Egbert Jan Groenink =

Dutch politician (born 1965)

Member of the House of Representatives
- In office 23 May 2002 – 30 January 2003

Personal details
- Born: 11 December 1965 Meppel, Netherlands
- Party: Pim Fortuyn List

Egbert Jan Groenink (born 11 December 1965) is a former Dutch politician who was a member of the House of Representatives for the Pim Fortuyn List.

Groenink was elected to the House of Representatives in the 2002 Dutch general election. He was originally placed 29 on the LPF list but gained his seat due to the murder of Fortuyn and other LPF MPs not taking their seats. In parliament, he was a member of the Srebrenica massacre Parliamentary Committee of Inquiry. He was not re-elected in 2003.
