= Bibi de Vries =

Dutch politician

Bibi de Vries (born March 15, 1963, in Egmond aan Zee, North Holland) was a member of the Dutch liberal VVD (Volkspartij voor Vrijheid en Democratie) parliamentary party in the House of Representatives. She was a member of Parliament from 1994 to 2006.

She was the vice-chairwoman of the VVD party in the House of Representatives from 2003 to 2006. In 2006, the chair of the VVD party in the House of Representatives, Jozias van Aartsen, stepped down because of the poor VVD election results in the 2006 Dutch municipal election. De Vries followed van Aartsen's example because she felt "connected" to him. Fellow VVD Parliament member Edith Schippers succeeded her as vice-chairwoman.

In the House of Representatives, she was associated for her party with economical and financial affairs like pensions, unemployment, and the like. She was chairwoman of the House of Representatives Commission for Government Expenses and was part of the Srebrenica Commission, which investigated the errors made by the Dutch UN army unit regarding the Srebrenica massacre in the Bosnian Srebrenica enclave.

When the second Balkenende Cabinet fell and new general elections were announced, de Vries declared she wouldn't return to Parliament after the elections and left Parliament. Shortly before the elections, she published a book about her experiences as vice-chairwoman.
