= Ine Aasted-Madsen =

Dutch politician (born 1961)

Member of the House of Representatives
- In office 3 September 2008 – 17 June 2010
- In office 13 May 2008 – 17 August 2008
- In office 21 May 2003 – 30 November 2006
- In office 23 May 2002 – 30 January 2003

Personal details
- Born: 23 May 1961 (age 65) Eindhoven, Netherlands
- Party: Christian Democratic Appeal

Josine Dominique Maria Petra "Ine" Aasted-Madsen-van Stiphout (born 23 May 1961) is a Dutch politician. She served in the House of Representatives intermittently from 2002 to 2010.
