= Arie van den Brand =

Dutch politician (1951–2026)

Arie van den Brand (22 February 1951 – 26 January 2026) was a Dutch GreenLeft politician. He was member of the House of Representatives for GreenLeft between May 2002 and March 2004.

== Early life ==
Van den Brand was born in Oostvoorne on 22 February 1951. He studied agriculture science at the University of Wageningen. He continued to work at the People's Academy of Bergen as director of the ILTC (the educational centre for the agricultural sector), and was a director of the foundation "In Natura". He was member of the Labour Party, but switched to GreenLeft in 2000.

== Parliament ==
In the 2002 election, Van den Brand was elected to the Dutch House of Representatives. He was spokesperson on agriculture, nature management, food safety, foreign trade, water management and tourism. After a heart attack he was inactive in parliament between December 2002 and September 2003. On March 10, 2004 he left parliament on the advice of his doctors, who held that the duties of an MP were too heavy a burden on his health. He was succeeded by Naïma Azough. As an MP, Van den Brand took a strong stance against violent animal liberation activism. He said that it was "appalling that violent animal activism does not respect any notion of the rule of law", in a debate in the House of Representatives. In his view, "violent forms of animal activism should be stopped with any means possible".

In 2017, van den Brand was again candidate for parliament, on this occasion for the Senate. The GreenLeft party congress however, did not place him on the places for two, three or four, for which he was a candidate.

== Sustainable agriculture ==
Outside of public life van den Brand was an advocate for sustainable agriculture and the president of Biologica. Around 2020 he managed a biological orchard in Wogmeer.

== Death ==
Van den Brand died in Winkel on 26 January 2026, at the age of 74.
