= Theo de Graaf =

Dutch politician (1942–2019)

Member of the House of Representatives
- In office 15 May 2002 – 2003

Personal details
- Born: 10 September 1942 The Hague
- Died: 11 November 2019 (aged 77) Capelle
- Party: Pim Fortuyn List (2002-2006); People's Party for Freedom and Democracy (1980-2002)
- Occupation: Politician, optician

Theo de Graaf (10 September 1942 - November 11, 2019) was a Dutch politician and an MP in the Member of the House of Representatives from 2002 to 2003 for the Pim Fortuyn List.

De Graff worked as an optician before becoming involved with politics and owned a chain of eyewear stores. He was initially a member of the People's Party for Freedom and Democracy before switching his support to the LPF. He was elected to parliament during the 2002 Dutch general election. In parliament, de Graff dealt with financial and economic affairs and public health and spoke twice in plenary on this subject. Following his election, de Graaf was accused of bribery and paying money to secure his parliamentary seat, although a subsequent investigation cleared him of wrongdoing.

De Graff died in 2019 in his hometown of Capelle.
