= Bas Jan van Bochove =

Dutch politician (born 1950)

Bas Jan Bochove
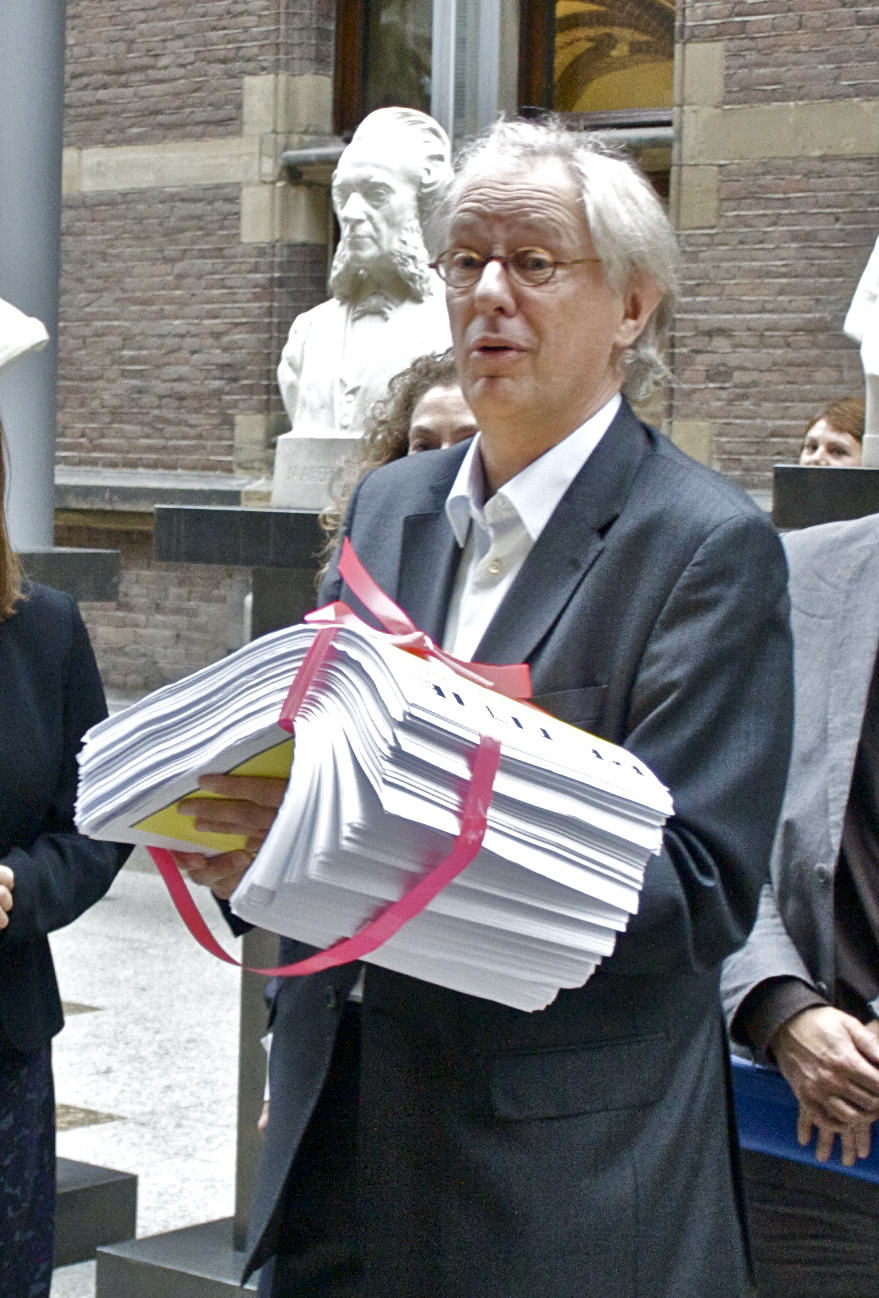

Mayor of Weesp
- Acting
- In office 1 April 2014 – 24 March 2022
- Preceded by: Bart Horseling

Member of the House of Representatives
- In office 26 October 2010 – 19 September 2012
- In office 23 May 2002 – 17 June 2010

Personal details
- Born: Bastiaan Jan van Bochove; 3 October 1950 (age 75) Ermelo, Netherlands
- Party: Christian Democratic Appeal (since 1977)
- Other political affiliations: Gemeentebelang Ermelo (1973–1975); People's Party for Freedom and Democracy (1973–1974)
- Relations: Married
- Education: Pedagogical College Rehoboth - Utrecht (BEd)
- Occupation: Politician, educator
- Website: (in Dutch) Christian Democratic Appeal website

Bastiaan Jan "Bas Jan" van Bochove (born 3 October 1950) is a Dutch politician and former educator serving as Acting Mayor of Weesp since 2014. A member of the Christian Democratic Appeal (CDA), he was a member of the House of Representatives from 2002 to 2012 with a brief interruption in 2010. As a parliamentarian, he focused on matters of housing, Kingdom relations and education.

== Biography ==
=== Career ===
Elected to the municipal council of Lelystad in 1982, Van Bochove presided over the party group from 1985 until 1990, when he was appointed as an alderman, a position he retained until 2002. After the 2010 general election, in which the Christian Democrats lost 20 seats, he lost his position as a member of the House of Representatives. He regained it in the following months, after parliamentarians resigned to join the First Rutte cabinet. In 2012, he left the House of Representatives. Van Bochove was the last mayor of Weesp from 2014 until the municipal merger with Amsterdam finalized on 24 March 2022. He was the longest-serving acting mayor of North Holland with a term of 95 months and 23 days.
