= Ineke van Gent =

Dutch politician (born 1957)

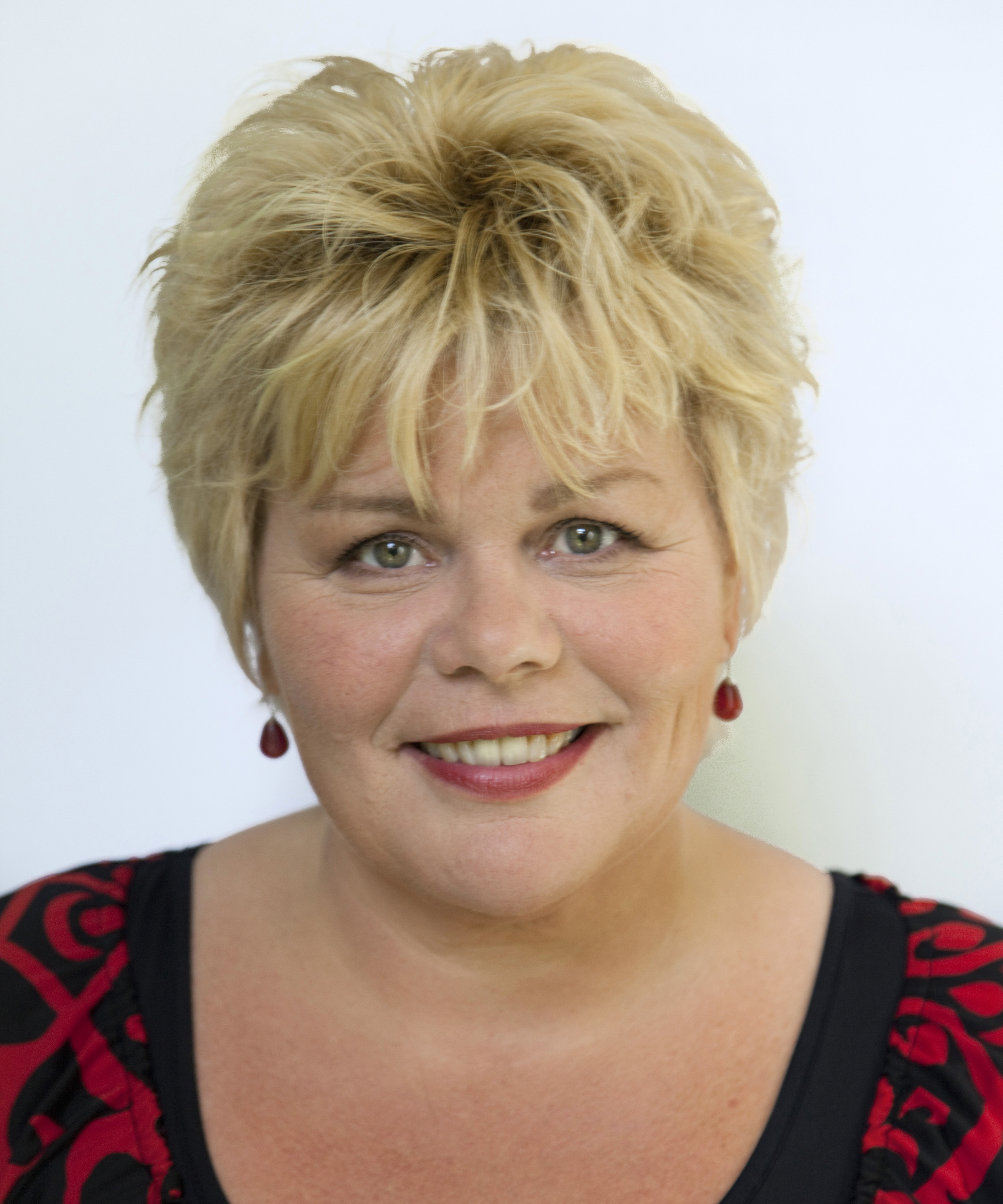
- Van Gent in 2010

Mayor of Schiermonnikoog
- Incumbent
- Assumed office 26 September 2017
- Preceded by: Dick Stellingwerf

Member of the House of Representatives
- In office 19 May 1998 – 19 September 2012

Personal details
- Born: Wilhelmina van Gent; 21 June 1957 (age 69) Arnhem, Netherlands
- Party: GroenLinks
- Other political affiliations: Pacifist Socialist Party (until 1991)
- Education: Social Academy (BA, Social work)
- Occupation: Politician, trade unionist, civil servant
- Website: (in Dutch) GroenLinks website

Wilhelmina "Ineke" van Gent (born 21 June 1957) is a Dutch politician serving as Mayor of Schiermonnikoog since 2017. A member of GroenLinks, she was a member of the House of Representatives from 1998 to 2012. She focused on matters of employment, social work, day care, emancipation, public transport and Kingdom relations.

== Biography ==
Van Gent attended both mavo and havo in Arnhem and attended the Social Academy. During and after her studies Van Gent worked as a check out clerk, cleaning lady and baby sitter and was active in the youth wing of the Pacifist Socialist Party, the PSJG. Between 1982 and 1985 she worked for the Groningen Housing agency as social advisor. Between 1985 and 1994 she was a member of the Groningen municipal council, first for the Pacifist Socialist Party (PSP) and from 1991 for GroenLinks into which the PSP had merged. From 1990 she was party group chairwoman. During this period was member of the party council of the PSP and GroenLinks. In 1993 she was a candidate for lijsttrekker for the national list, but she failed to enter the second round of voting. Van Gent worked as the North Netherlands-coordinator of the FNV labour union between 1994 and 1998, when she was elected to the House of Representatives.

Van Gent focuses on two major themes: solidarity, including housing, social policy, employment, regional and economic policy, and durability, including agriculture, nature and animal rights. Van Gent has voted against the GreenLeft parliamentary party on several important issues: she voted against the marriage of Willem-Alexander, Prince of Orange and Máxima Zorreguieta, because she is a republican and she spoke out against GreenLeft's support for the invasion of Afghanistan. Van Gent initiated several legislative programs, concerning legal protection for whistle blowers, housing subsidies for students and constitutional protection of animal welfare. She has criticized lavish parties for departing politicians by saying "you can knock a zero off the price tag for most of them." She was opposed to a reduction in benefits to Turkish and Moroccan parents. She has criticized poor railway performance; she said "They are ‘ready for winter’, except when it snows."
