= Margreeth Smilde =

Dutch politician

Margaretha Charlotte Adelheid (Margreeth) Smilde (born 6 June 1954 in Leeuwarden) is a former Dutch politician. As a member of the Christian Democratic Appeal (Christen-Democratisch Appèl) she was an MP from 26 July 2002 to 29 January 2003, from 3 June 2003 to 29 November 2006 and from 23 January 2008 to 19 September 2012. She focused on matters of public health, constitutional affairs and the Royal House.

== Decorations ==
- On September 19, 2012, she was awarded Knight of the Order of Orange-Nassau.
