= Nihat Eski =

Dutch politician

Nihat Eski (born 24 July 1963 in Tosya, Turkey) is a Dutch politician of Turkish descent. He is a member of the Christian Democratic Appeal.
