= Naïma Azough =

Dutch politician (born 1972)

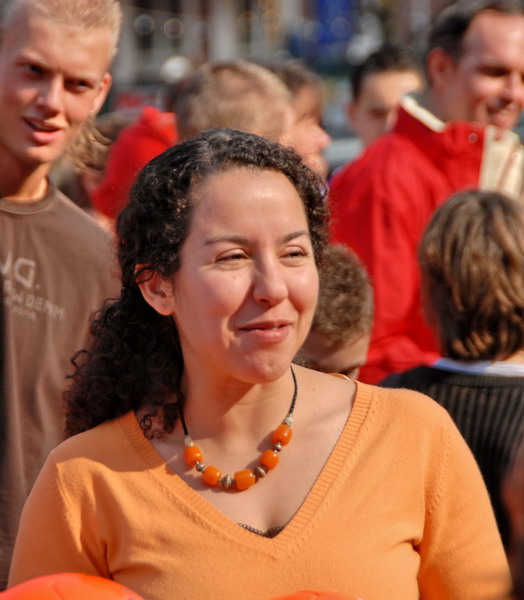
- Azough in 2007

Member of the House of Representatives
- In office 2004–2010
- In office 2002–2003

Personal details
- Born: 1 April 1972 (age 54) Asdif, Morocco
- Party: GreenLeft

Naïma Azough (born 1 April 1972 in Asdif, Morocco) is a Dutch politician for GreenLeft. From 2002 till 2010 she had been member of the House of Representatives, with a short break between 2003 and 2004 and a break because of maternity leave in 2009.

Azough studied English and German at the University of Antwerp and International Relations at the University of Amsterdam. During her studies in Antwerp she was involved in committees against the Vlaams Blok. She worked as journalist for the IKON and at the debate centre De Balie. Between 1999 and 2001 she worked for Rotterdam 2001, the organization which organized the activities surrounding Rotterdam's election as Cultural Capital of Europe in 2001.

In the 2002 elections she was elected to the House of Representatives. During the 2003 elections she was unable to keep her seat. Between 2003 and 2004 she returned to journalism, now presenting the VPRO's cultural magazine Kunst Moet Zwemmen ("Art has to swim") and NMO's debating program De Dialoog ("The Dialogue"). In 2004, when Arie van den Brand's departure left a vacancy, she returned to parliament. Prior to the parliamentary elections of 2010, Azough was the parliamentary party's specialist on migration, home affairs and welfare. In 2010, she left public office.
