= Maarten Haverkamp =

Dutch politician (born 1974)

Maarten Cornelis Haverkamp (born 15 March 1974 in Langbroek) is a Dutch politician. As a member of the Christian Democratic Appeal (Christen-Democratisch Appèl) he was an MP from 26 July 2002 to 17 June 2010 and from 26 October 2010 to 19 September 2012. He focused on matters of media policy, aviation and public transport.

In May 2025, he was sworn in as mayor of the municipality of De Bilt, in the province of Utrecht.
