= Mirjam Sterk =

Dutch politician

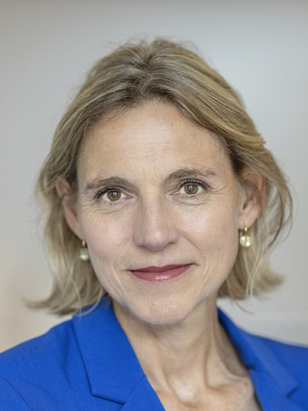
- Sterk in 2023

Minister of Long-term Care, Youth and Sport
- Incumbent
- Assumed office 23 February 2026
- Prime Minister: Rob Jetten

Member of the House of Representatives
- In office 23 May 2002 – 19 September 2012

Member of the Provincial Executive of Utrecht
- In office 9 February 2022 – 23 February 2026
- Preceded by: Hanke Bruins Slot
- Succeeded by: Gijs de Kruif

Personal details
- Born: Willemina Roziena Catharina Sterk; 23 May 1973 (age 53) Zeist, Netherlands
- Party: Christian Democratic Appeal
- Education: Utrecht University (MA)
- Occupation: Politician; minister; civil servant; editor; educator

Willemina Roziena Catharina "Mirjam" Sterk (born 23 May 1973) is a Dutch politician, civil servant, NH editor, and educator. As a member of the Christian Democratic Appeal she was a member of the House of Representatives from 23 May 2002 (on maternity leave from 8 April to 29 July 2008, replaced by Sabine Uitslag) until 19 September 2012. She focused on matters of integration policy and social affairs. Since 9 February 2022, she has been a member of the provincial executive of Utrecht.

== Life ==
Sterk is a member of the Protestant Church in the Netherlands (PKN) and studied theology at Utrecht University. She is married and has three children. From May 2002 to September 2012 she was a member of the House of Representatives.

Following the controversial deportation of Roma migrants from France in 2010, Sterk advocated the deportation of Romani from the Netherlands. She said in an interview for Algemeen Dagblad that sending Romani who are unemployed and cause nuisance back to Hungary and Romania is a "good approach".

In February 2022, she succeeded Hanke Bruins Slot in the Provincial Executive of Utrecht, when she became interior minister. Sterk also headed a CDA committee to investigate the party's loss of seats in the 2023 general election. It concluded that the new party leader, Henri Bontenbal, and parliamentary group should be given time, space, and trust to continue its new course.

On February 23, 2026, she was sworn in as Minister of Long-term Care, Youth and Sport in the Jetten cabinet, formed by her own CDA, D66, and VVD.

== Decorations ==
- In 2012 she was awarded Knight of the Order of Orange-Nassau.
