= List of candidates in the 2006 Dutch general election =

Prior to the 2006 Dutch general election, contesting parties put forward party lists.

== 1: Christian Democratic Appeal ==
Candidate list for the Christian Democratic Appeal
Position	Candidate	Votes	Result
1	Jan Peter Balkenende	2,198,114	Elected
2	Maxime Verhagen	79,981	Elected
3	Maria van der Hoeven	74,626	Elected
4	Gerda Verburg	18,881	Elected
5	Piet Hein Donner	25,279	Elected
6	Joop Wijn	11,080	Elected
7	Pieter van Geel	8,190	Elected
8	Joop Atsma	16,169	Elected
9	Mirjam Sterk	13,839	Elected
10	Annie Schreijer-Pierik	31,788	Elected
11	Jan Schinkelshoek	942	Elected
12	Jan de Vries	2,119	Elected
13	Liesbeth Spies	4,850	Elected
14	Kathleen Ferrier	2,958	Elected
15	Karien van Gennip	3,994	Elected
16	Henk Jan Ormel	5,554	Elected
17	Ruud van Heugten	2,314	Elected
18	Sybrand van Haersma Buma	811	Elected
19	Coskun Çörüz	1,076	Elected
20	Eddy van Hijum	1,422	Elected
21	Bas Jan van Bochove	778	Elected
22	Ger Koopmans	9,047	Elected
23	Cees van der Knaap	724	Elected
24	Wim van de Camp	1,097	Elected
25	Elly Blanksma-van den Heuvel	3,139	Elected
26	Ad Koppejan	2,065	Elected
27	Rikus Jager	1,881	Elected
28	Cisca Joldersma	1,149	Elected
29	Jan Jacob van Dijk	683	Elected
30	Janneke Schermers	3,350	Elected
31	Jan Mastwijk	10,602	Elected
32	Frans de Nerée tot Babberich	676	Elected
33	Jack Biskop	1,343	Elected
34	Roland Kortenhorst	1,468	Elected
35	Jos Hessels	4,422	Elected
36	Jan ten Hoopen	566	Elected
37	Pieter Omtzigt	1,934	Elected
38	Nicolien van Vroonhoven-Kok	1,286	Elected
39	Maarten Haverkamp	734	Elected
40	Marleen de Pater-van der Meer	820	Elected
41	Jules Kortenhorst	713	Elected
42	Ans Willemse-van der Ploeg	1,095	Replacement
43	Corien Jonker	1,375	Replacement
44	Eddy Bilder	1,442	Replacement
45	Raymond Knops	5,224	Replacement
46	Sander de Rouwe	1,607	Replacement
47	Madeleine van Toorenburg	636	Replacement
48	Antoinette Vietsch	426	Replacement
49	Margreeth Smilde	1,276	Replacement
50	Sabine Uitslag	6,535	Replacement
51	Ine Aasted-Madsen-van Stiphout	5,383	Replacement
52	Wilbert Stolte	355	
53	Hein Pieper	1,536	Replacement
54	Rendert Algra	10,510	Replacement
55	Nihat Eski	816	Replacement
56	Olger van Dijk	4,362	
57	Titus Frankemölle	600	
58	Dinand Ekkel	388	
59	Marieke van der Werf	626	
60	Theo Hanssen	1,440	
61	Gerald de Haan	1,372	
62	Gerda Kempen-van Dommelen	360	
63	Hennie Bogaards-Simonse	169	
64	Ans van Zeeland	1,216	
65	Couzijn Bos	953	
66	Jan Eerbeek	230	
67	Jet Weigand-Timmer	140	
68	Marjolein Hak-Loots	1,827	
69	Thea Koster	425	
70	Gerben Karssenberg	120	
71	Brigit Homan	554	
72	Pieter van der Zaag	231	
73	André Kolodziejak	274	
74	Luc Jalink	2,606	
Total			

== 2: Labour Party ==
Candidate list for the Labour Party
Position	Candidate	Votes	Result
1	Wouter Bos	1,727,313	Elected
2	Nebahat Albayrak	122,779	Elected
3	Aleid Wolfsen	20,048	Elected
4	Jet Bussemaker	24,110	Elected
5	Ton Heerts	3,811	Elected
6	Sharon Dijksma	23,833	Elected
7	Bert Koenders	8,497	Elected
8	Mariëtte Hamer	3,914	Elected
9	Martijn van Dam	3,497	Elected
10	Marianne Besselink	7,402	Elected
11	Frans Timmermans	6,599	Elected
12	Attje Kuiken	2,797	Elected
13	Jacques Tichelaar	3,257	Elected
14	Gerdi Verbeet	1,380	Elected
15	Ferd Crone	1,014	Elected
16	Pauline Smeets	4,135	Elected
17	Hans Spekman	4,435	Elected
18	Angelien Eijsink	1,453	Elected
19	Diederik Samsom	6,248	Elected
20	Chantal Gill’ard	1,230	Elected
21	Staf Depla	1,952	Elected
22	Agnes Wolbert	2,359	Elected
23	Jeroen Dijsselbloem	706	Elected
24	Lutz Jacobi	2,882	Elected
25	Paul Kalma	616	Elected
26	Samira Bouchibti	6,199	Elected
27	John Leerdam	5,121	Elected
28	Lia Roefs	1,393	Elected
29	Luuk Blom	608	Elected
30	Lea Bouwmeester	3,217	Elected
31	Eelke van der Veen	8,422	Elected
32	Roos Vermeij	1,845	Elected
33	Harm Evert Waalkens	7,352	Elected
34	Khadija Arib	6,028	Replacement
35	Paul Tang	543	Replacement
36	Margot Kraneveldt-van der Veen	729	Replacement
37	Pierre Heijnen	2,050	Replacement
38	Mei Li Vos	6,376	Replacement
39	Frank Heemskerk	720	
40	Marjo van Dijken	4,579	Replacement
41	Co Verdaas	1,347	
42	Anja Timmer	1,563	Replacement
43	Jan Boelhouwer	1,037	Replacement
44	Patricia Linhard	631	Replacement
45	Niesco Dubbelboer	2,024	
46	Martin van Haeften	322	
47	Saskia Laaper-ter Steege	852	Replacement
48	Robert Serry	172	
49	Keklik Demir-Yücel	2,772	Replacement
50	Andries van den Berg	438	
51	Ria Oonk	1,564	
52	Karina Schaapman	2,180	
53	Ocker van Munster	278	
54	Amma Asante	3,234	
55	Guus Krähe	708	
56	Marieke Blom	4,499	
57	Ahmed Larouz	4,647	
58	Kirsten Verdel	657	
59	Ali Saraç	2,967	
60	Hester Macrander	822	
61	Kees Beekmans	289	
62	Charlotte Riem Vis	374	
63	Reinier Prijten	153	
64	Erna Hooghiemstra	222	
65	Jan-Dirk Sprokkereef	163	
66	Elsbeth van Hijlckama Vlieg	223	
67	Tjeerd van Dekken	480	
68	Janine Roelfsema	486	
69	Ian van der Kooye	618	
70	Hilde Laffeber	212	
71	Joris van Esch	261	
72	Riet Teeuwsen-de Haas	393	
73	Ruud van Zuilen	118	
74	Alice Muller	343	
75	Rob de Werd	274	
76	Huri Sahin	851	
77	Alain van de Haar	765	
78	Milou Dijkman	349	
79	Sjoerd Hauptmeijer	248	
80	Wilma Brouwer	4,092	
Total			

== 3: People's Party for Freedom and Democracy ==
Candidate list for the People's Party for Freedom and Democracy
Position	Candidate	Votes	Result
1	Mark Rutte	553,200	Elected
2	Rita Verdonk	620,555	Elected
3	Henk Kamp	100,507	Elected
4	Brigitte van der Burg	16,195	Elected
5	Laetitia Griffith	67,515	Elected
6	Fred Teeven	7,124	Elected
7	Edith Schippers	2,858	Elected
8	Atzo Nicolaï	3,700	Elected
9	Johan Remkes	5,343	Elected
10	Willibrord van Beek	1,619	Elected
11	Hans van Baalen	3,601	Elected
12	Anouchka van Miltenburg	1,943	Elected
13	Charlie Aptroot	1,638	Elected
14	Arend Jan Boekestijn	1,662	Elected
15	Helma Neppérus	1,296	Elected
16	Ineke Dezentjé Hamming-Bluemink	2,423	Elected
17	Stef Blok	1,794	Elected
18	Paul de Krom	591	Elected
19	Halbe Zijlstra	884	Elected
20	Han ten Broeke	1,646	Elected
21	Frans Weekers	4,915	Elected
22	Janneke Snijder-Hazelhoff	3,670	Elected
23	Ton Elias	1,861	Replacement
24	Gert-Jan Oplaat	2,601	
25	Cees Meeuwis	863	Replacement
26	Mark Harbers	1,093	Replacement
27	Lilian Callender	810	
28	Rob Bats	1,139	
29	André Bosman	1,323	
30	Zsolt Szabó	1,461	
31	Tom Kuperus	6,668	
32	Wiet de Bruijn	1,477	
33	Jelleke Veenendaal	2,659	
34	Janmarc Lenards	471	
35	Oswald Schwirtz	363	
36	Nancy Kabalt	810	
37	Pieter Litjens	456	
38	Jan Verhoeven	940	
39	Ard van der Steur	541	
40	Tamara Venrooy-van Ark	494	
41	Margot Cooijmans	420	
42	Ingrid de Caluwé	352	
43	Jeroen de Veth	351	
44	Marcel Lücht	375	
45	John Aarts	864	
46	Ockje Tellegen	612	
47	Bas Mouton	349	
48	Hildebrand de Boer	170	
49	Sjoerd Potters	244	
50	Marnix de Ridder	514	
51	Gemma van Heusden-Wienen	543	
52–56	Regional candidates		
Total			

=== Regional candidates ===
Regional candidates for People's Party for Freedom and Democracy
Candidate	Votes	Result	Position			
Candidate	Votes	Result	Groningen, Leeuwarden, Assen, Zwolle, Lelystad	Nijmegen, Arnhem, Tilburg, 's-Hertogenbosch, Maastricht	Utrecht, Amsterdam, Haarlem, Den Helder	's-Gravenhage, Rotterdam, Dordrecht, Leiden, Middelburg
Betty de Boer	742		56			
Anneke Broekman-Veltman	204		54			
Mehmet Demirbag	191					54
Denise Eikelenboom	282				53	
Henk van Ginkel	294					55
Alexander de Goeij	438			55		
Bert-Jan Hakvoort	212		52			
René de Heer	294		55			
Lonneke van Heeswijk	438			52		
Jan Carel Jonker	98					53
René Kamphuis	949					56
Erik Koppe	1,340			56		
Dick Middelhoek	97				54	
Alex van Pelt	155			53		
Nahied Rezwani	163					52
Tine Schaafsma-Buijs	1,034				56	
Hans Schlösser	104			54		
Anoushka Schut-Welkzijn	475				55	
Harry Vogels	105				52	
Tineke Wigchering-van Delden	194		53			

== 4: Socialist Party ==
Candidate list for the Socialist Party
Position	Candidate	Votes	Result
1	Jan Marijnissen	1,344,190	Elected
2	Agnes Kant	169,664	Elected
3	Harry van Bommel	14,221	Elected
4	Jan de Wit	9,163	Elected
5	Krista van Velzen	14,081	Elected
6	Ewout Irrgang	1,587	Elected
7	Ronald van Raak	1,729	Elected
8	Emile Roemer	2,965	Elected
9	Renske Leijten	4,791	Elected
10	Paul Ulenbelt	807	Elected
11	Ron Abel	1,450	Elected
12	Sharon Gesthuizen	1,595	Elected
13	Jasper van Dijk	1,372	Elected
14	Sadet Karabulut	17,333	Elected
15	Nathalie de Rooij	3,068	Elected
16	Hans van Leeuwen	667	Elected
17	Fons Luijben	785	Elected
18	Paulus Jansen	716	Elected
19	Remi Poppe	1,809	Elected
20	Arda Gerkens	1,098	Elected
21	Rosita van Gijlswijk	3,946	Elected
22	Henk van Gerven	807	Elected
23	Marianne Langkamp	971	Elected
24	Tiny Kox	826	Elected, but declined
25–29	Regional candidates		
30	Huub Oosterhuis	9,923	
Total			

=== Regional candidates ===
Regional candidates for Socialist Party
Candidate	Votes	Result	Position									
Candidate	Votes	Result	Groningen, Leeuwarden, Assen	Zwolle, Nijmegen, Arnhem	Lelystad, Utrecht	Amsterdam, Haarlem, Den Helder	Den Haag, Leiden	Rotterdam, Dordrecht	Middelburg	Tilburg	Den Bosch	Maastricht
Lies van Aelst	487							27				
Remine Alberts-Oosterbaan	585					29						
Gonny Andreas-de Jong	284									28		
Frans Baron	642		27									
Farshad Bashir	580	Replacement	25									
Gertjan Bouterse	79								28			
Rikus Brader	124			25								
Marga van Broekhoven	290									26		
Thijs Coppus	757											28
Theo Cornelissen	550							26				
Nuh Demirbilek	357				28							
Gerrie Elfrink	418			29								
Wim van Gammeren	139				26							
Bernard Gerard	650										29	
Ingrid Gyömörei-Agelink	299						27					
Hennie Hemmes	602		26									
Mariska ten Heuw	1,299			26								
Arnout Hoekstra	159							29				
Hans van Hooft	465			27								
Frans Huijsmans	108									25		
Jef Kleijnen	1,394											27
Johan Kwisthout	335									27		
Paul Lempens	804	Replacement										25
Fons van Limpt	124								25			
Jacqueline Meijers-Gabriël	829											29
Wim Moinat	376		29									
Hilde van der Molen	400					27						
Harre van der Nat	144						25					
John van Otterloo	153					26						
Hugo Polderman	192	Replacement								29		
Trix de Roos-Consemulder	472	Replacement							26			
Bob Ruers	179				29							
Colette Sacco	332					25						
Joost van der Sluis	104							25				
Manja Smits	880	Replacement	28									
Naomi Smulders	198						28					
Ger van Unen	124								29			
Hans Verbakel	349										25	
Bart Vermeulen	107						26					
Cécile Visscher	313										26	
Fetse Visser	159							28				
Paulien van Vlaanderen	284				27							
Jan Voogdt	103				25							
Jurgen Vos	161								27			
Ake de Vries	260					28						
Daniël Westhoek	180						29					
Riet de Wit-Romans	1,386											26
Tonnie Wouters-van Broekhoven	401										28	
Düzgün Yildirim	1,041			28								
Spencer Zeegers	581										27	

== 5: Pim Fortuyn List ==
Candidate list for the Pim Fortuyn List
Position	Candidate	Votes	Result
1	Olaf Stuger	11,085	
2	Mat Herben	5,070	
3	Cobie Gardien-Reinders	1,003	
4	João Varela	1,371	
5	René Ridder van Rappard	200	
6	Agnes Leewis	236	
7	Rick Datema	126	
8	Joost Mulder	192	
9	John Witkamp	204	
10	Pierre de Lange	76	
11	Alexander van Hattem	136	
12	Chris Hottentot	100	
13	Cees Koenen	76	
14	Wim van Overveld	88	
15	Anton Reebergen	59	
16	Leen Molenkamp	44	
17	Rudy Reker	67	
18	Daan Zuijderduijn	40	
19	Claudia Vis	106	
20	Dave van der Meer	49	
21	Ed Arnold	102	
22	Bert Doelman	27	
23	Theun Lagewaard	25	
24	Elke Vlasveld-van Langen	56	
25	Anne Schaaf	47	
26	Olof Wullink	55	
27	Dave Vrijenhoek	42	
28	Engel Vrouwe	274	
Total			

== 6: GroenLinks ==
Candidate list for GroenLinks
Position	Candidate	Votes	Result
1	Femke Halsema	390,662	Elected
2	Kees Vendrik	5,680	Elected
3	Wijnand Duijvendak	7,233	Elected
4	Mariko Peters	8,268	Elected
5	Ineke van Gent	6,030	Elected
6	Naima Azough	10,654	Elected
7	Tofik Dibi	2,161	Elected
8	Jolande Sap	1,644	Replacement
9	Mathieu Heemelaar	744	Replacement
10	Isabelle Diks	1,450	Replacement
11	Jup van ‘t Veld	413	
12	Mária van Veen	937	
13	Cees Korvinus	1,220	
14	Rik Grashoff	398	
15	Nen van Ramshorst	397	
16	Jaap Dirkmaat	671	
17	Birgül Dönmez	3,501	
18	Iwan Leeuwin	2,486	
19	René Kerkwijk	438	
20	Maarten van Beek	201	
21	Xaviera Ringeling	869	
22	Saranna Maureau	300	
23	Riza Diktas	546	
24	Tof Thissen	626	
25	Symone de Bruin	501	
26	Gon Mevis	432	
27	Jan Atze Nicolai	415	
28	Adri Wever	176	
29	Vincent Bijlo	1,122	
30	Kathalijne Buitenweg	2,879	
Total			

== 7: Democrats 66 ==
Candidate list for the Democrats 66
Position	Candidate	Votes	Result
1	Alexander Pechtold	95,937	Elected
2	Boris van der Ham	27,860	Elected
3	Bert Bakker	8,375	
4	Ageeth Telleman	13,667	
5	Kajsa Ollongren	3,174	
6	Fatma Koser Kaya	34,564	Elected
7	Mark Sanders	934	
8	Ingrid van Engelshoven	1,120	
9	Gerben-Jan Gerbrandij	252	
10	Salima Belhaj	763	
11	Frans van Drimmelen	205	
12	Meine Oosten	235	
13	Degi ter Haar	242	
14	Marcel Houtkamp	131	
15	Joris Hillebrand	152	
16	Harry van Alphen	167	
17	Lidwien van Langen-Bezemer	275	
18	Jan van den Heuvel	245	
19	Erik Veldman	194	
20	Arthur van Buitenen	99	
21	Gerard Bos	472	
22	Shanta Singh	345	
23	Henk Beerten	139	
24	Roelof van Netten	85	
25	Constantijn Dolmans	95	
26–30	Regional candidates		
Total			

=== Regional candidates ===
Regional candidates for Democrats 66
Candidate	Votes	Result	Position																	
Candidate	Votes	Result	Groningen	Leeuwarden	Assen	Zwolle	Lelystad	Nijmegen	Arnhem	Utrecht	Amsterdam	Haarlem	Den Helder	Den Haag	Rotterdam	Dordrecht	Leiden	Middelburg	Tilburg	Den Bosch
Marom Ayoubi	218							30							29	29			29	29
John Bijl	78						29							29	27	28	27	29		
Duco Bodewes	121					26		27	27	26				27						27
Thirza Bronner	216		29							29	28	27	28				29			
Rineke Gieske-Mastenbroek	198		26	26	26	27	26				26	26								
Pieter van der Ploeg	79							29	29	28	27				28		28			
Jolanta Polomski	640			30			30		30	30	30	30								
Pieter Romijn	358										29	29	30		30	30		30		
Johan Sieswerda	174		27	27	27	28	27						26							
Harry Span	363				30							28		30					30	30
Doede de Vries	546		30	29	29	30							29				30			
Berend de Vries	158							28	28							26		27	27	28
André van Wanrooij	53									27				28	26	27	26	28	28	
Paul Wessels	232							26	26					26				26	26	26
Jan Zelle	71		28	28	28	29	28						27							

== 8: Christian Union ==
Candidate list for the Christian Union
Position	Candidate	Votes	Result
1	André Rouvoet	342,205	Elected
2	Arie Slob	4,612	Elected
3	Tineke Huizinga-Heringa	26,258	Elected
4	Joël Voordewind	1,849	Elected
5	Cynthia Ortega-Martijn	2,761	Elected
6	Ernst Cramer	631	Elected
7	Esmé Wiegman-van Meppelen Scheppink	1,386	Replacement
8	Ed Anker	736	Replacement
9	Martine van Meekeren-Vonk	2,373	
10	Rogier Havelaar	1,309	
11	Gertine van Ingen-ten Brinke	323	
12	Simone Kennedy-Doornbos	369	
13	Gijsbert van den Brink	329	
14	Koen de Snoo	204	
15	Herman Timmermans	127	
16	Gerdien Rots	370	
17	Arthur Vlaardingerbroek	128	
18	Melis van de Groep	123	
19	Freek Brouwer	340	
20	Tjitske Kuiper-de Haan	260	
21	Marcel Companjen	355	
22	Aaike Kamsteeg	205	
23	Leon Meijer	1,779	
24	Marien Bikker	107	
25	Jan van Eijsden	105	
26	Marcel Benard	125	
27	Klaas Tigelaar	211	
28	Janine Clement-de Jonge	229	
29	Rita Klapwijk-Poppe	1,160	
Total			

== 9: Reformed Political Party ==
Number	Candidate	Votes	Result
1	Bas van der Vlies	141,636	Elected
2	Kees van der Staaij	5,878	Elected
3	Elbert Dijkgraaf	970	
4	Henk Leertouwer	962	
5	Hans Tanis	255	
6	Diederik van Dijk	237	
7	Arjan Bregman	101	
8	Arnold Weggeman	187	
9	Leendert de Knegt	389	
10	Peter Schalk	164	
11	A.P. de Jong	122	
12	Eibert Klein	250	
13	George van Heukelom	262	
14	M. Bogerd	208	
15	J.D. Heijkamp	104	
16	Roelof Bisschop	145	
17	Adri van Heteren	140	
18	F.W. den Boef	43	
19	L. Bolier	60	
20	P.C. den Uil	52	
21	Gerrit Holdijk	86	
22	Peter Zevenbergen	63	
23	Dick van Meeuwen	79	
24	A.J.C. van Bemmel	65	
25	L.G.I. Barth	35	
26	N. Verdouw	107	
27	C.S.L. Janse	45	
28	Dirk Jan Budding	119	
29	A.A. Egas	174	
30	Wim Fieret	328	

== 10: Netherlands Transparant ==
Candidate list for Netherlands Transparent
Position	Candidate	Votes	Result
3	Jeroen Nieuwesteeg	52	
4	Anton van Putten	72	
5	Paul Schaap	96	
6	Harrie Timmerman	111	
7	Louis Bertholet	55	
8	Henk Laarman	32	
9	Petra Tenbült	103	
10	Jim van Batenburg	43	
11	Wim Steketee	72	
12	Pamela Hemelrijk	304	
Total			

== 11: Party for the Animals ==
Candidate list for Party for the Animals
Position	Candidate	Votes	Result
1	Marianne Thieme	150,307	Elected
2	Esther Ouwehand	4,370	Elected
3	Bernd Timmerman	1,650	
4	Lieke Keller	1,385	
5	Peter Boogaard	821	
6	Birgit Verstappen	868	
7	Carla van Viegen	466	
8	Anja Hazekamp	517	
9	Ton Dekker	474	
15	Dirk Boon	196	
16	Renée Vermijs-van Dongen	397	
17	Karen van Holst Pellekaan	353	
18	Ivo de Wijs	989	
19–30	Regional candidates		
Total			

=== Regional candidates ===
Regional candidates for Party for the Animals
Candidate	Votes	Result	Position											
Candidate	Votes	Result	Groningen	Leeuwarden	Assen	Zwolle	Lelystad	Nijmegen	Amsterdam	Den Helder	Den Haag	Rotterdam	Den Bosch	Maastricht
Mohammed Benzakour	211		23	22	23	22	23	23	23	23	23	23	23	23
Gerti Bierenbroodspot	383		19		19		19	19	19	19	19	19	19	19
Wanda Bodewitz	104						12		12	14	13			
Paul Cliteur	470		22	21	22	21	22	22	22	22	22	22	22	22
Jan Peter Cruiming	49		12											
Marleen Drijgers	552		10			10	10	11	10	10	10	10	10	10
Martin Gaus	1,933		28	27	28	27	28	28	28	28	28	28	28	28
Annemarie van Gelder	128		13	11	14									
Maarten ‘t Hart	796		24	23	24	23	24	24	24	24	24	24	24	24
Bert Hollander	104		14	13	12								14	
Octavie Jetten-Rubens	453													12
Joop de Jonge	143					11	13	10		13		13	13	
Kees van Kooten	4,479		30	29	30	29	30	30	30	30	30	30	30	30
Rudy Kousbroek	368		21	20	21	20	21	21	21	21	21	21	21	21
Jacob Lindenbergh	19				11									
Belinda Meuldijk	2,209		27	26	27	26	27	27	27	27	27	27	27	27
Charlotte Mutsaers	193		25	24	25	24	25	25	25	25	25	25	25	25
Leo Neijenhuijs	64					14		14					12	13
Menno Nicolai	41			12										
Diana Saaman	152					12		12		12				14
Mensje van der Steen	171		20	19	20	19	20	20	20	20	20	20	20	20
Bert Stoop	266		11	14	13									
Tjerk van der Veen	172								13		12	12		
Georgina Verbaan	1,337		26	25	26	25	26	26	26	26	26	26	26	26
Harry Voss	422					13	14	13	14		14	14		11
Dafne Westerhof	563			10			11		11	11	11	11	11	
Eric van Wingerde	60				10									
Jan Wolkers	1,353		29	28	29	28	29	29	29	29	29	29	29	29

== 12: One NL ==
Candidate list for One NL
Position	Candidate	Votes	Result
1	Marco Pastors	50,167	
2	Joost Eerdmans	7,046	
3	Hikmat Mahawat Khan	500	
4	Ronald Sörensen	936	
5	Seçil Arda	441	
6	Sander Simons	163	
7	Anton van Schijndel	191	
8	Edward Verheij	58	
9	Petra den Hollander	287	
10	Gideon Simon	96	
11	Bert Visker	42	
12	Sander Boon	62	
13	Ingeborg Hoogveld	71	
14	Gerlof Jukema	48	
15	Jan Steen	65	
16	Sylvia Veereschild	63	
17	Ronald Hunse	52	
18	Jan Dirk Blaauw	40	
19	Hans Smolders	1,492	
20	Anton Molenaar	28	
21	Ronald Schneider	17	
22	Stephanie van Moorsel	78	
23	René Keuzenkamp	67	
24	Shirley Pigmans	31	
25	Ron Boers	28	
26	Arie-Wim Boer	55	
27	Astrid van Wijk-van Yperen	51	
28	Peter Stok	33	
29	Robert Simons	63	
30	Simon Fortuijn	558	
Total			

== 13: Group Wilders/Party for Freedom ==
Candidate list for Group Wilders/Party for Freedom
Position	Candidate	Votes	Result
1	Geert Wilders	566,197	Elected
2	Fleur Agema	5,910	Elected
3	Raymond de Roon	448	Elected
4	Hero Brinkman	618	Elected
5	Martin Bosma	391	Elected
6	Dion Graus	1,296	Elected
7	Barry Madlener	344	Elected
8	Teun van Dijck	114	Elected
9	Sietse Fritsma	127	Elected
10	Richard de Mos	282	Replacement
11	Auke Zijlstra	540	
12	Geert Tomlow	122	
13	Hélène Boot	484	
14	Paul Sonnenschein	262	
15	Lucas Hartong	178	
16	Sheren Cheng	496	
17	Roeland van Zoelen	223	
18	Hans Leemans	162	
19	Rick van der Linden	205	
20	Patricia van der Kammen	1,091	
Total			

== 14: List 14 ==
Candidate list for List 14
Position	Candidate	Votes	Result
1	Huib Poortman	862	
2	Paul Freriks	137	
3	Lies Visscher-Endeveld	114	
4	Jan van Aken	239	
5	Edgar Wortmann	131	
6	Ad van Rooij	127	
7	Theo Tromp	46	
8	Ronald van der Beek	55	
9	Micha Kuiper	43	
10	Martin Dessing	217	
11	Rob Brockhus	19	
12	Arno Haije	19	
13	André Fleeré	33	
14	Jan Parmentier	35	
15	Wim Sweers	17	
16	Ton Luiting	10	
17	Robert Verlinden	77	
Total			

== 15: Party for Netherlands ==
Candidate list for Party for Netherlands
Position	Candidate	Votes	Result
1	Hilbrand Nawijn	3,135	
2	Berthoo Lammers	340	
3	Mariëtte van Leeuwen	289	
4	Willem van der Velden	86	
5	Mischa Martherus	98	
6	Helen Vos	113	
7	Sjef Siemons	69	
8	Arnoud van Doorn	33	
9	Fred Dekker	64	
10	Olaf van Boetzelaer	43	
11	Paul Meijer	34	
12	Paul Just de la Paisières	18	
13	Khalid Ahmed Chaudry	329	
14	Frederik van Zweeden	14	
15	Ruby Ketting Olivier	41	
16	Margaux Lelijveld	18	
17	Henk Schattenberg	24	
18	Ron Kraft	13	
19	Cor van Loo	37	
20	George Talens	18	
21	Rein Kuiper	14	
22	Ageeth Dik	22	
23	Bauke Vaatstra	45	
24	Jos Hendriks	19	
25	Tjeerd Sleeswijk Visser	94	
Total			

== 16: Continue Directe Democratie Partij ==
Candidate list for Continue Directe Democratie Partij
Position	Candidate	Votes	Result
1	Rob Verboom	365	
2	Joop van Wingerden	49	
3	Manfred de Grooth	25	
4	Maarten Meijer	37	
5	Johan Wilson	19	
6	John Wilson	64	
Total			

== 17: Liberal Democratic Party ==
Candidate list for Liberal Democratic Party
Position	Candidate	Votes	Result
1	Sammy van Tuyll van Serooskerken	1,581	
2	Linda Beijlsmit	274	
3	Carolien Harrems	77	
4	John Heck	30	
5	Jochem Sprenger	23	
6	Hans Daale	30	
7	Jaap van Eenennaam	33	
8	Reinier Zeldenrust	33	
9	Frans van de Camp	23	
10	Patty Harpenau	39	
11	Antoine Endtz	14	
12	Hans Beyer	26	
13	Peter Luijten	26	
14	Regional candidates		
Total			

=== Regional candidates ===
Regional candidates for Liberal Democratic Party
Candidate	Votes	Result	Position	
Candidate	Votes	Result	Groningen	Other
Theo Bax	67			14

== 18: United Seniors Party ==
Candidate list for United Seniors Party
Position	Candidate	Votes	Result
1	Herman Troost	8,087	
2	Corrie Vonk	933	
3	Piet Veugen	844	
4	Mechteld Wouters	474	
5	Ulrich Wijbers	182	
6	Ed Spanjerberg	104	
7	Anka Broers-Meyer	278	
8	Jack Koehorst	43	
9	Cees Blankenstein	61	
10	Eric Zwahlen	76	
11	Cor Pot	126	
12	Anton Braat	47	
13	Joop Moonen	96	
14	Ron Meyer	38	
15	Floor Le Hane	119	
16	Piet Bruijstens	78	
17	Selene Broers	34	
18	Hans Tempelman	73	
19	Wim Spithoven	28	
20–27	Regional candidates		
Total			

=== Regional candidates ===
Regional candidates for United Seniors Party
Candidate	Votes	Result	Position	
Candidate	Votes	Result	Other	Maastricht
Theo van den Acker	89		26	25
Lieke de Bruin	38		21	20
Jac Creijghton	43		25	24
Jo Inslegers	380		27	26
Jan Rensen	17		23	22
Nell Schoenmakers	181		24	23
Ann de Wolf	35		20	
Ton van Zandbergen	18		22	21

== 19: Ad Bos Collective ==
Candidate list for Ad Bos Collective
Position	Candidate	Votes	Result
1	Ad Bos	4,597	
2	Hans Boer	100	
3	Leonard Jonkers	65	
4–10	Regional candidates		
Total			

=== Regional candidates ===
Regional candidates for Ad Bos Collective
Candidate	Votes	Result	Position per electoral district							
Candidate	Votes	Result	Groningen, Leeuwarden	Zwolle	Lelystad, Nijmegen	Arnhem, Amsterdam, Haarlem, Den Helder	Utrecht	Den Haag	Rotterdam, Dordrecht, Leiden	Tilburg, Maastricht
Henk Bakker jr.	46		6	6	4	4	7	5	5	4
Koos Landers	118		10	10	10	10	10	10	7	10
Marco Menger	62		7	4	7	6	4	4	4	6
Jasmijn Miete	70		5	5	5	5	6	6	6	5
Fatima Salama	36		4	7	6	8	5	7	9	7
Ger van der Veen	37		8	8	8	7	8	8	10	8
Wil Vervloet	18		9	9	9	9	9	9	8	9

== 20: Green Free! Internet Party ==
Candidate list for Green Free! Internet Party
Position	Candidate	Votes	Result
1	Wernard Bruining	1,533	
2	Simon Bouwkamp	119	
3	Ruud Beijer	75	
4	Joop Weber	35	
5	Cees Hendriks	79	
6	Simon Vinkenoog	456	
Total			

== 21: Islam Democrats ==
Candidate list for Islam Democrats
Position	Candidate	Votes	Result
1	Arif Potmis	759	
2	Bedrettin Budak	2,499	
3	Ahmed El Baghdadi	288	
4	Robert Sadiek	135	
5	Abdelsadek Maas	200	
6	Ismaeil Mohamed Ismaeil	192	
7	Suzan Elci	142	
8	Abderrahim Abgar	124	
Total			

== 22: Tamara's Open Party ==
Candidate list for Tamara's Open Party
Position	Candidate	Votes	Result
1	Tamara Bergfeld	114	
Total			

== 23: Solid Multicultural Party ==
Candidate list for Solid Multicultural Party
Position	Candidate	Votes	Result
1	Max Sordam	123	
2	Annemarie van Dams	8	
3	Otto Beek	14	
4	Lirdes Martis	15	
5	Bianca Chin-a-Loi	8	
6	Imro Biervliet	8	
7	Romeo Caffé	8	
Total			

== 24: LRVP - hetZeteltje ==
Candidate list for LRVP - hetZeteltje
Position	Candidate	Votes	Result
1	Sander van der Sluis	185	
Total			

== See also ==
- List of members of the House of Representatives of the Netherlands, 2006–2010

== Sources ==
- Kiesraad (27 November 2006). "Proces-verbaal zitting Kiesraad uitslag Tweede Kamerverkiezing 2006" (PDF) (in Dutch).
