= List of Socialist Party (Netherlands) senators =

This is a list of members of the Senate of the Netherlands for the Socialist Party (SP).

== List ==
Member	Start date	End date	Ref.
Lies van Aelst	13 February 2024		
Bastiaan van Apeldoorn	9 June 2015		
Hans-Martin Don	9 June 2015	10 June 2019	
Tuur Elzinga	12 June 2007	30 September 2016	
Arda Gerkens	14 May 2013	12 June 2023	
Sineke ten Horn	12 June 2007	6 June 2011	
Rik Janssen	11 June 2019		
Frank Köhler	9 June 2015	10 June 2019	
Tiny Kox	10 June 2003	12 February 2024	
Erik Meijer	8 July 2014	8 June 2015	
Meta Meijer	9 June 2015	10 June 2019	
Anja Meulenbelt	10 June 2003	6 June 2011	
Henk Overbeek	4 October 2016	10 June 2019	
Paul Peters	12 June 2007	6 June 2011	
Nanneke Quik-Schuijt	12 June 2007	8 June 2015	
Ronald van Raak	10 June 2003	28 November 2006	
Geert Reuten	12 June 2007	8 June 2015	
Geert Reuten	26 June 2018	10 June 2019	
Bob Ruers	19 May 1998	9 June 2003	
Bob Ruers	12 December 2006	11 June 2007	
Bob Ruers	7 June 2011	19 June 2018	
Bob Ruers	5 February 2019	10 June 2019	
Kees Slager	12 June 2007	6 June 2011	
Tineke Slagter-Roukema	10 June 2003	8 June 2015	
Eric Smaling	12 June 2007	13 May 2013	
Arjan Vliegenthart	12 June 2007	2 July 2014	
Driek van Vugt	8 June 1999	9 June 2003	
Anneke Wezel	9 June 2015	31 January 2019	
Jan de Wit	13 June 1995	18 May 1998	
Düzgün Yildirim	12 June 2007	25 September 2007 (Note: He continued as an independent politician until 7 June 2011 after being expelled from the Socialist Party.)	
