= Bob Ruers =

Dutch lawyer and politician

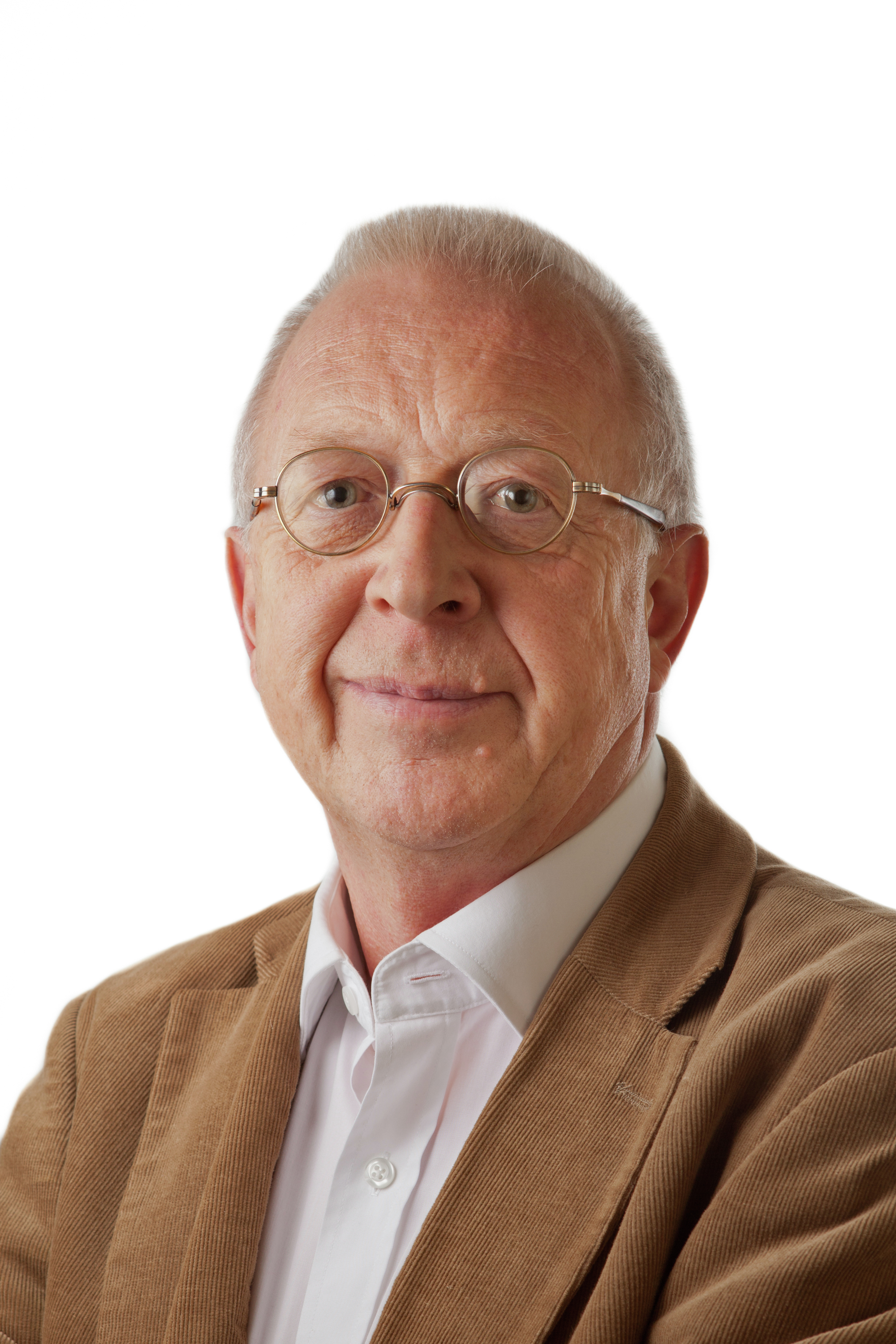

Member of the Senate
- In office 5 February 2019 – 11 June 2019; 7 June 2011 – 20 June 2018; 12 December 2006 – 12 June 2007

Leader of the Socialist Party in the Senate
- In office 19 May 1998 – 10 June 2003
- Preceded by: Jan de Wit
- Succeeded by: Tiny Kox

Personal details
- Born: Robert Frank Ruers; 24 May 1947 (age 78) Sittard, the Netherlands
- Occupation: Attorney · politician

Robert Frank Ruers (born 24 May 1947) is a Dutch politician and attorney. On behalf of the Socialist Party (SP) he was a member of the Senate four times and briefly a deputy of the provincial executive of Limburg.

== Career ==
Ruers grew up in Sittard, Limburg, where he attended gymnasium at the Bisschoppelijk College. Initially he wanted to become a priest. During his studies in Utrecht he became a member of the SP in 1972. Educated in private law, Ruers worked successively at the GAK and the NOS. From 1980 he was a lawyer and attorney at law.

In 1986, Ruers became the first municipal councilor for the SP in Utrecht. He was a councilor and parliamentary leader until 2001. He was also associated with the national party apparatus of the SP, especially in legal matters. In 1995 he was the initiator of the Comité Asbestslachtoffers (CAS; 'Asbestos Victims Committee') affiliated with the SP. He conducted, among other things, compensation claims for former employees of Eternit, who had contracted cancer as a result of exposure to asbestos.

On 19 May 1998, Ruers first became a member of the Senate, as interim successor to Jan de Wit, who left for the House of Representatives. As a one-man faction and from 1999 a member of a two-man faction, he was involved in very diverse matters in the Senate. In 2003 he retired from politics to focus more on legal support for the CAS. From January 2000, Ruers was a member of the supervisory board of the Instituut voor Asbestslachtoffers (IAS).

On 12 December 2006, he was sworn in again as a member of the Senate, succeeding Ronald van Raak, who was elected to the House of Representatives in the 2006 general election. In the 2007 Senate election, Ruers was not in an eligible position. In the 2011 Senate election, Ruers was in an eligible position and was re-elected to the Senate.

In March 2012, he obtained his doctorate at Erasmus University Rotterdam with a thesis entitled "Power and Countervailing Power in Dutch Asbestos Regulations". On 20 June 2018, Ruers left the Senate after he was sworn in as a member of the Limburg provincial executive on 15 June. He remained active in the provincial government for only a few months. After speaking out against a wind turbine plan that the coalition in Limburg was in favor of, GroenLinks submitted a motion of censure in September 2018. Because the Labour Party and Democrats 66 appeared to support the motion, the SP withdrew Ruers and SP deputy Marleen van Rijnsbergen from the board.

On 5 February 2019, he was again installed as a member of the Senate as successor to Anneke Wezel. In the 2019 Senate election, he was in an ineligible place on the list of candidates and was not re-elected.

== Electoral history ==
Electoral history of Bob Ruers
Year	Body	Party	Pos.	Votes	Result		Ref.
Year	Body	Party	Pos.	Votes	Party seats	Individual	Ref.
2024	European Parliament	Socialist Party	25	997	0	Lost	
