= Eemdijk =

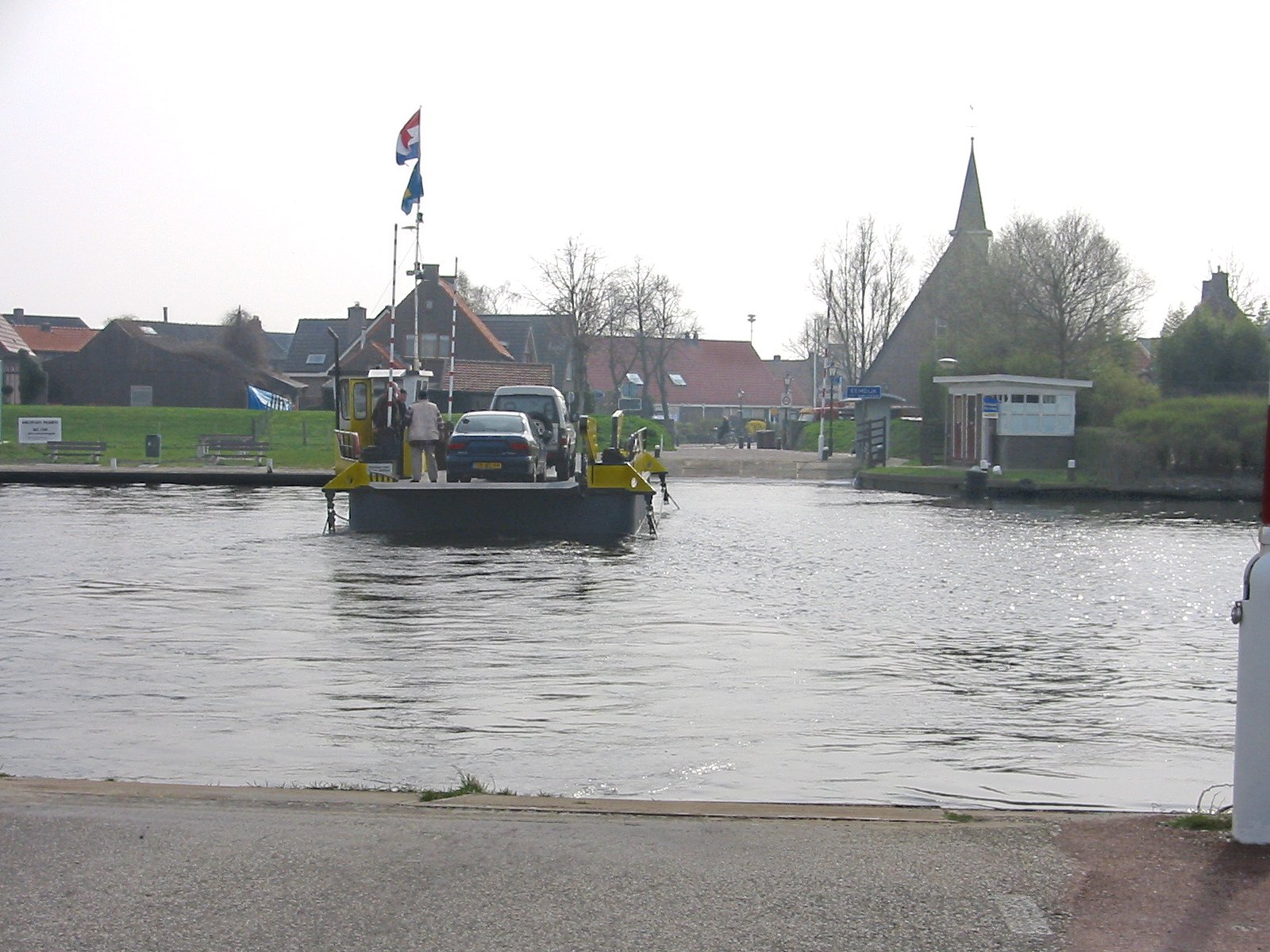
- The ferry, with Eemdijk on the other side.

- Location in the Netherlands Eemdijk (Netherlands)
- Coordinates: 52°15′15″N 5°19′43″E
- Country: Netherlands
- Province: Utrecht
- Municipality: Bunschoten

Area
  - Total: 3.32 km^{2} (1.28 sq mi)
- Elevation: 0.2 m (0.66 ft)

Population (2021)
  - Total: 820
  - Density: 250/km^{2} (640/sq mi)
- Time zone: UTC+1 (CET)
  - Summer (DST): UTC+2 (CEST)
- Postal code: 3754
- Dialing code: 033

Eemdijk is a village on the river Eem in the Dutch province of Utrecht. It is in the municipality of Bunschoten, about 3 km west of Bunschoten-Spakenburg. Formerly, most of the population consisted of farmers or factory workers.

The village has a small ferry, which is still in use (except on Sundays). The singer Drs. P recorded the video clip for his song De veerpont ("The ferry") in Eemdijk.

It was first mentioned in the 18th century Dyk Huyse. The current name means dike on the Eem. In 1840, it was home to 156 people.

== Gallery ==
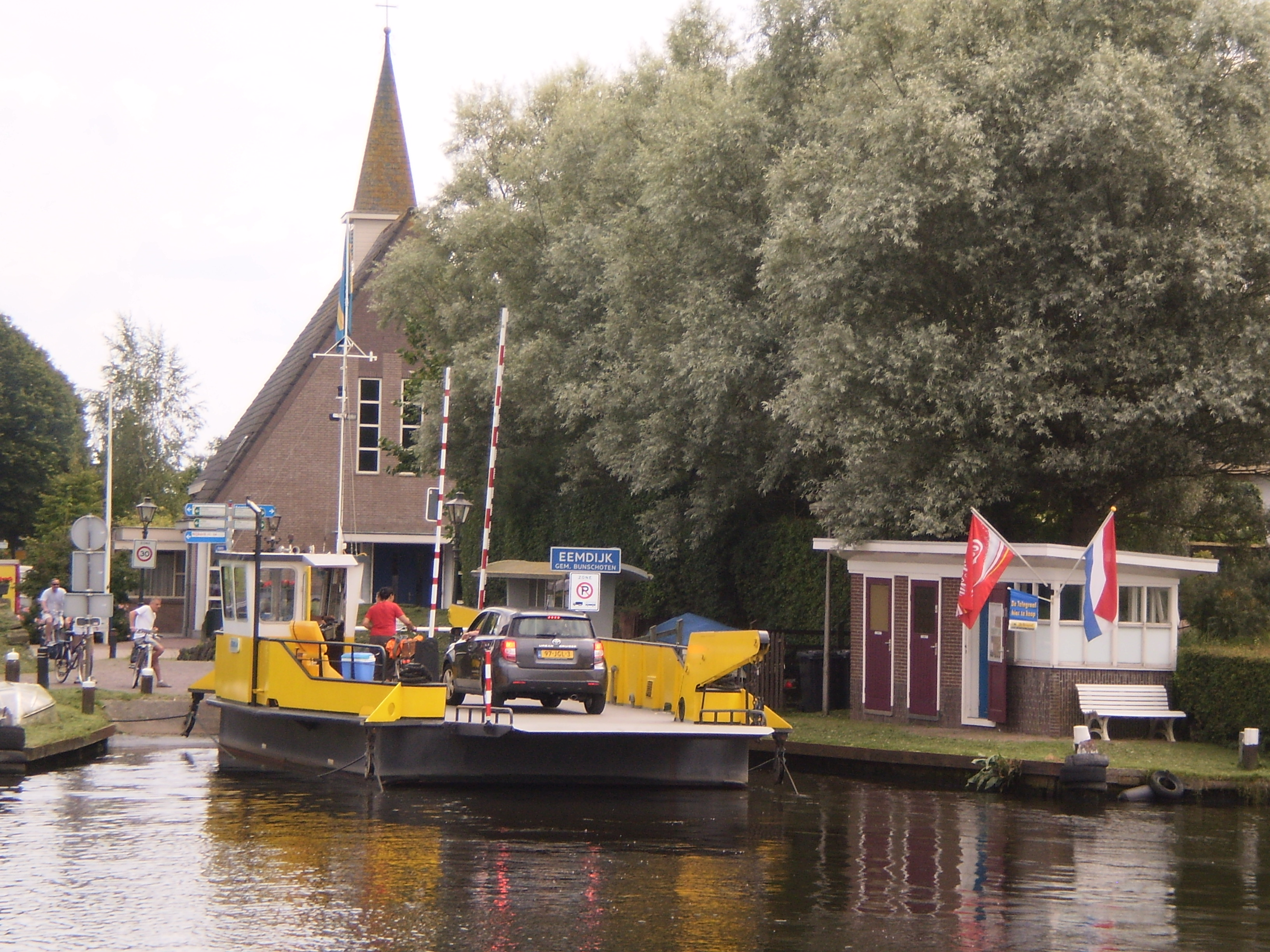
Village view

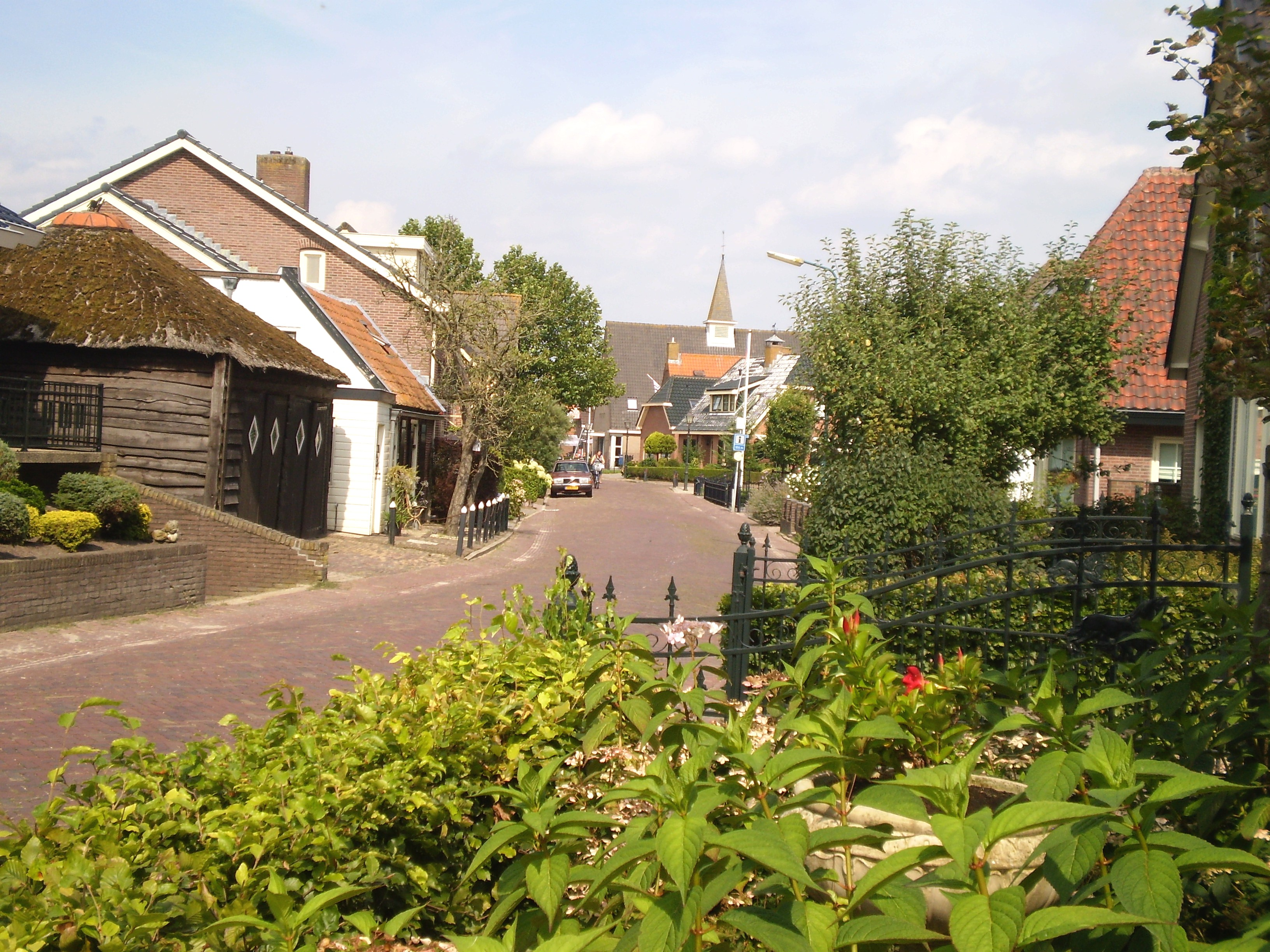
Street of Eemdijk

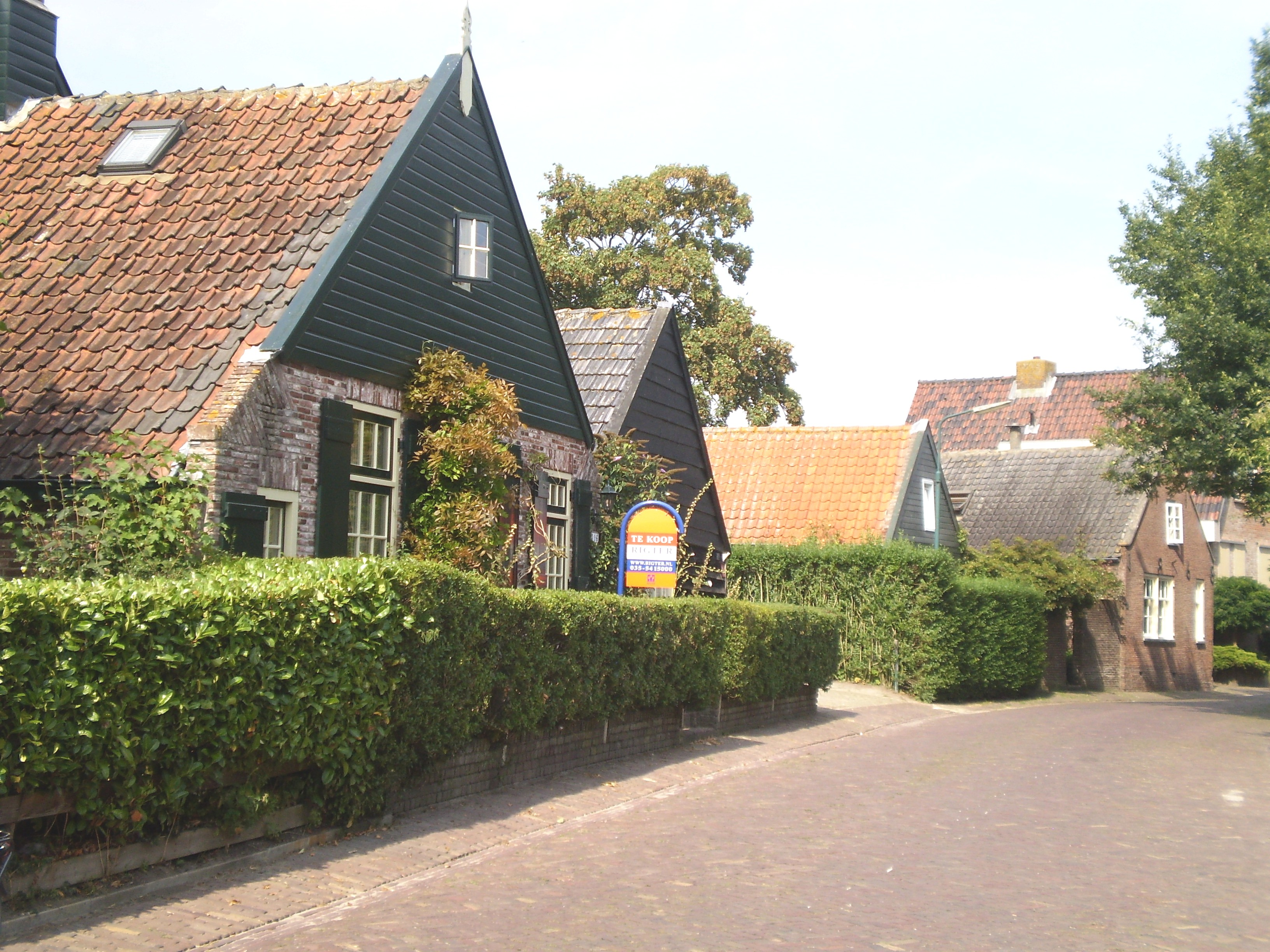
Streetview

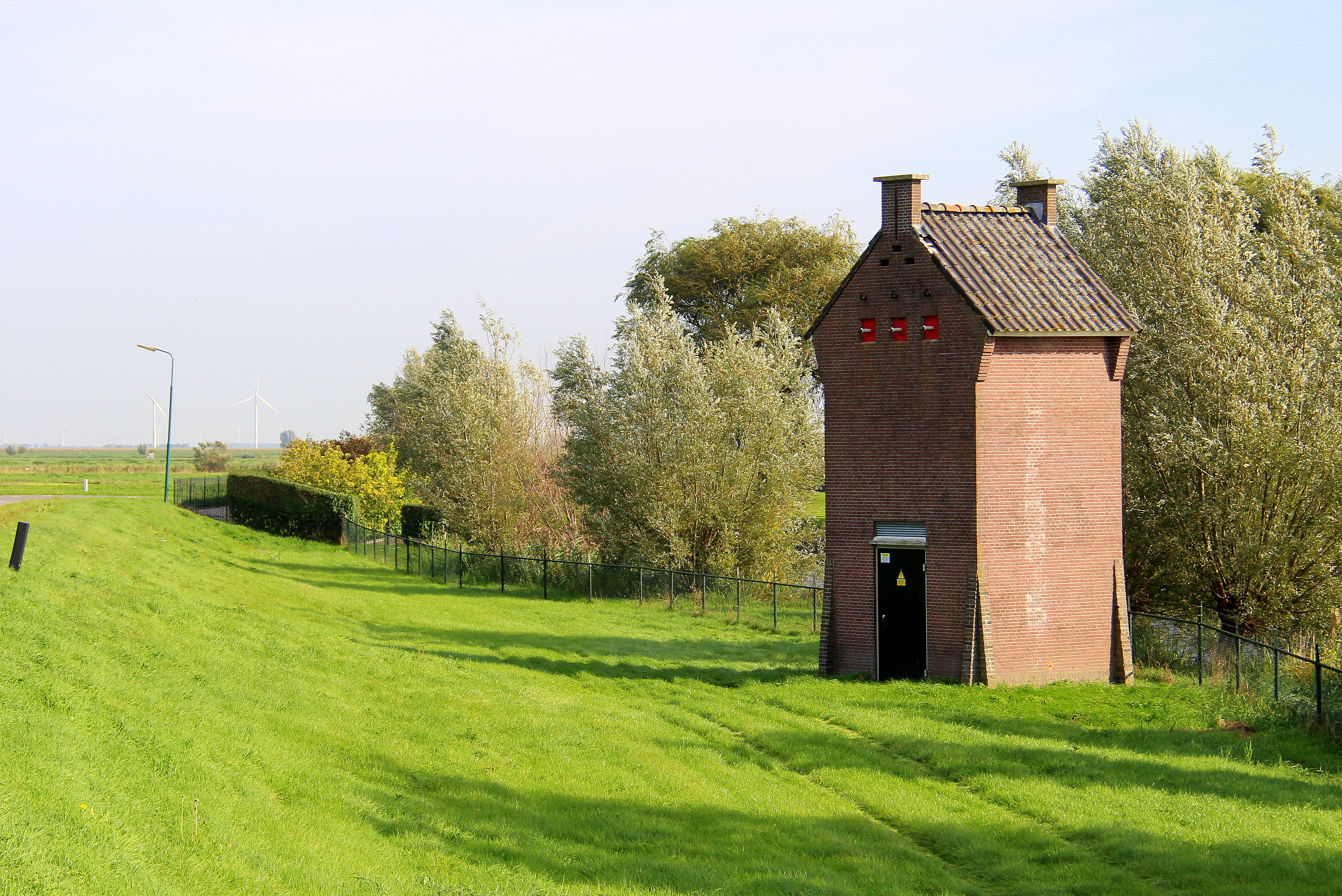
Electricity house
