= Teun van Dijck =

Dutch politician (born 1963)

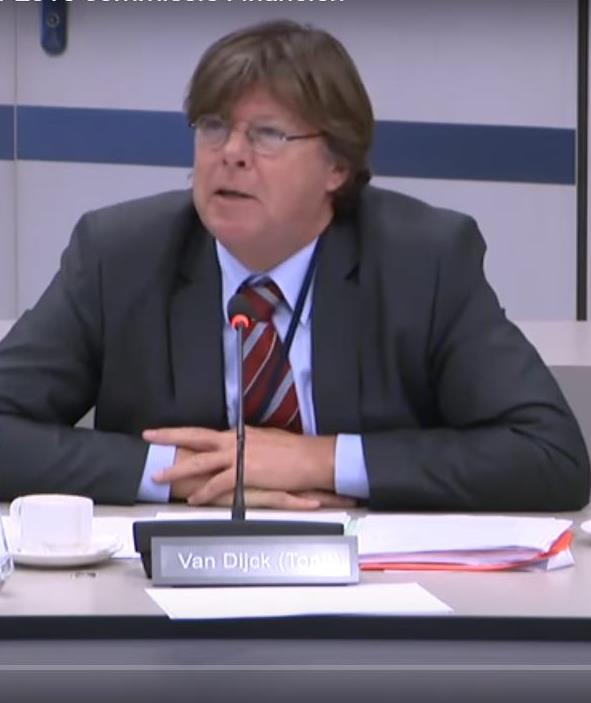

Member of the House of Representatives
- Incumbent
- Assumed office 30 November 2006

Personal details
- Born: Antoine Pierre Cornelis van Dijck; 13 September 1963 (age 62) Venlo, Netherlands
- Party: Party for Freedom
- Spouse: Jasmin Clifton
- Children: 2
- Education: Eindhoven University of Technology (MSc, Engineering management)
- Occupation: Politician, management consultant, restaurateur, saxophonist
- Website: (in Dutch) Party for Freedom website

Antoine Pierre Cornelis "Teun" van Dijck (born 13 September 1963) is a Dutch politician of the Party for Freedom (PVV) and a former management consultant and restaurateur.

== Life ==
Van Dijck was born in Venlo in September 1963. He was a childhood friend of Geert Wilders, who would later establish the PVV, having been born in the same month and living in the same street. He performed various jobs, including management and consulting positions. He lived on Curaçao from 1993 to 2006, where among others he owned a restaurant and worked for the local government.

On behalf of the PVV, he has served as a member of the House of Representatives since 30 November 2006. He focused on matters of state pensions and other pensions, and finances has been his portfolio following his re-election in 2023.

== Personal life ==
Van Dijck played saxophone under the stage name Tony Saxofony. He is married to Miss Curaçao 1993 Jasmin Clifton, with whom he has two children.

== Electoral history ==
Electoral history of Teun van Dijck
Year	Body	Party	Pos.	Votes	Result		Ref.
Year	Body	Party	Pos.	Votes	Party seats	Individual	Ref.
2006	House of Representatives	Party for Freedom	8	114	9	Won	
2010	House of Representatives	Party for Freedom	7	1,039	24	Won	
2012	House of Representatives	Party for Freedom	6	590	15	Won	
2017	House of Representatives	Party for Freedom	8	416	20	Won	
2021	House of Representatives	Party for Freedom	8	466	17	Won	
2023	House of Representatives	Party for Freedom	10	557	37	Won	
2025	House of Representatives	Party for Freedom	8	619	26	Won	
