= Zevenhuizen, Utrecht =

Zevenhuizen
- Hamlet
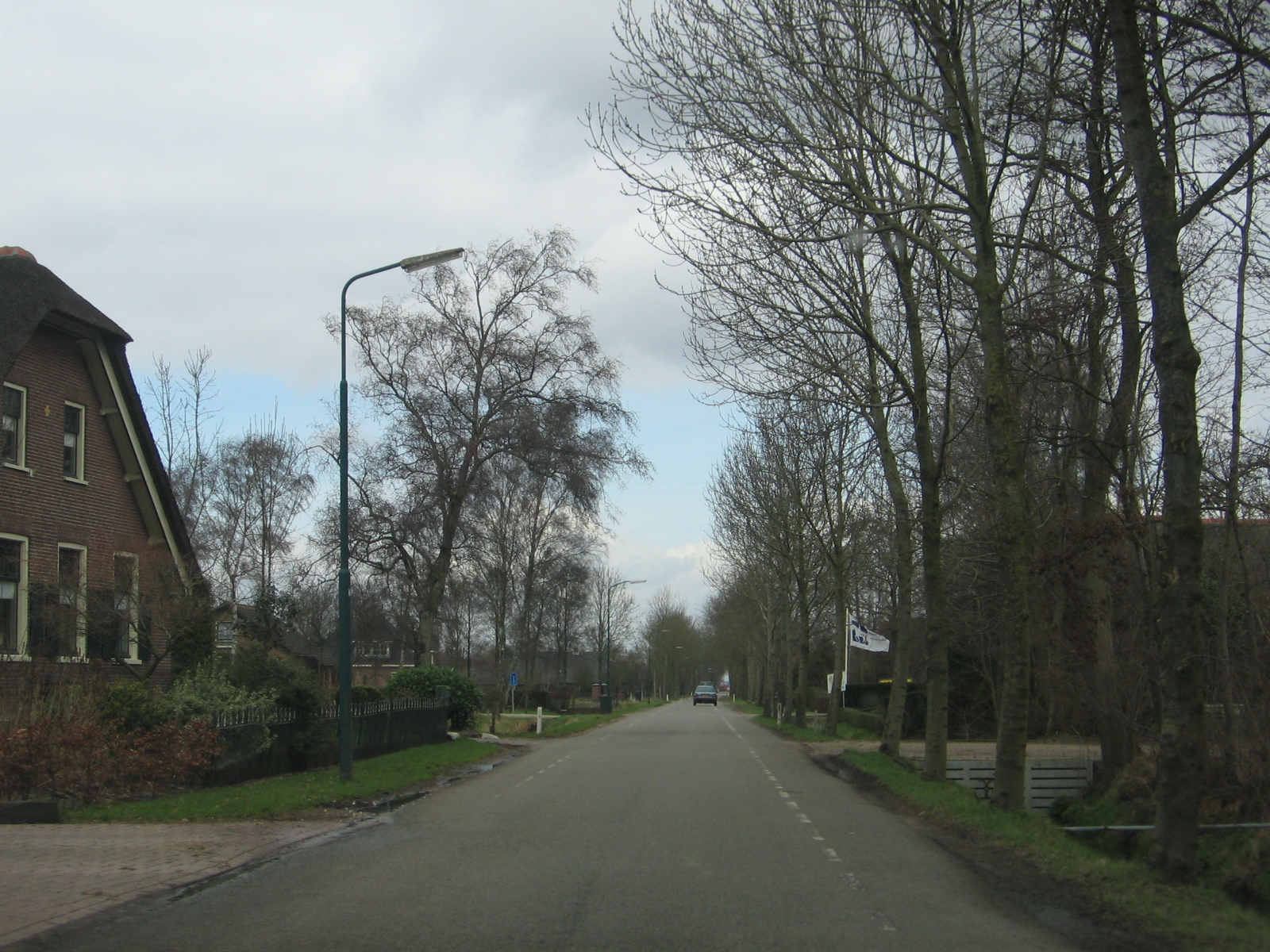

- Location in the Netherlands Zevenhuizen (Netherlands)
- Coordinates: 52°12′41″N 5°23′20″E
- Country: Netherlands
- Province: Utrecht
- Municipality: Bunschoten
- Time zone: UTC+1 (CET)
  - Summer (DST): UTC+2 (CEST)
- Postal code: 3751
- Dialing code: 033

Zevenhuizen is a hamlet in the Dutch province of Utrecht. It is a part of the municipality of Bunschoten, and lies about 6 km north of the centre of Amersfoort. The village consists of a single road, the Zevenhuizerstraat.

It was first mentioned in 1469 as Soevenhuysen, and means seven houses. Zevenhuizen is not a statistical entity, and the postal authorities have placed it under Bunschoten-Spakenburg. Since 2012, it has place name signs. In 1840, it was home to 31 people. Nowadays, it consists of about 30 houses.
