= Bunschoten =

- Municipality
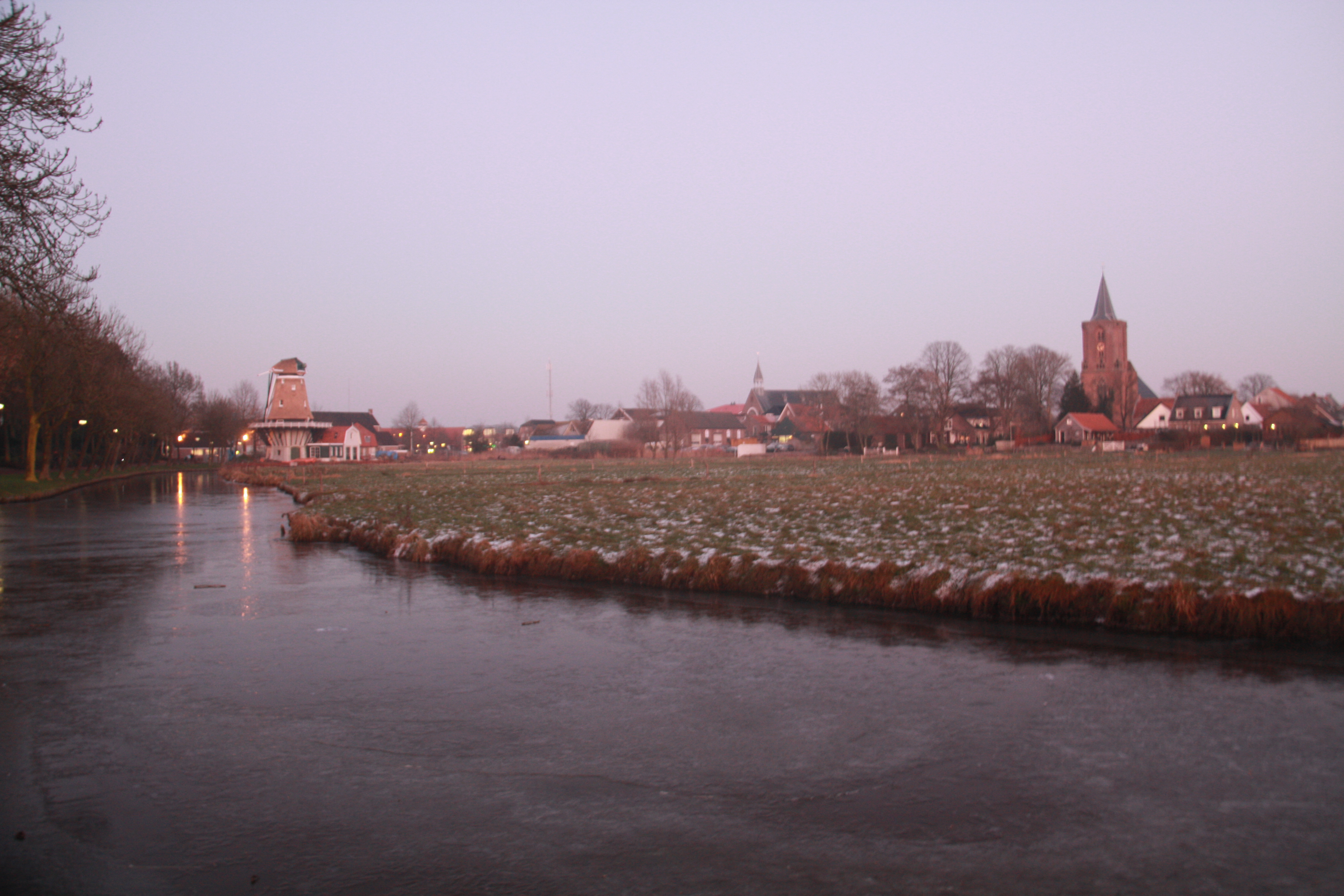
- Countryside in Bunschoten

- Flag Coat of arms

- Location in Utrecht
- Coordinates: 52°15′N 5°22′E
- Country: Netherlands
- Province: Utrecht

Government
  - Body: Municipal council
  - Mayor: Jaco Geurts (CDA)

Area
  - Total: 34.81 km^{2} (13.44 sq mi)
  - Land: 30.38 km^{2} (11.73 sq mi)
  - Water: 4.43 km^{2} (1.71 sq mi)
- Elevation: 0 m (0 ft)

Population (January 2021)
  - Total: 22,019
  - Density: 725/km^{2} (1,880/sq mi)
- Demonym: Bunschoter(s)
- Time zone: UTC+1 (CET)
  - Summer (DST): UTC+2 (CEST)
- Postcode: 3750–3754
- Area code: 033
- Website: www.bunschoten.nl

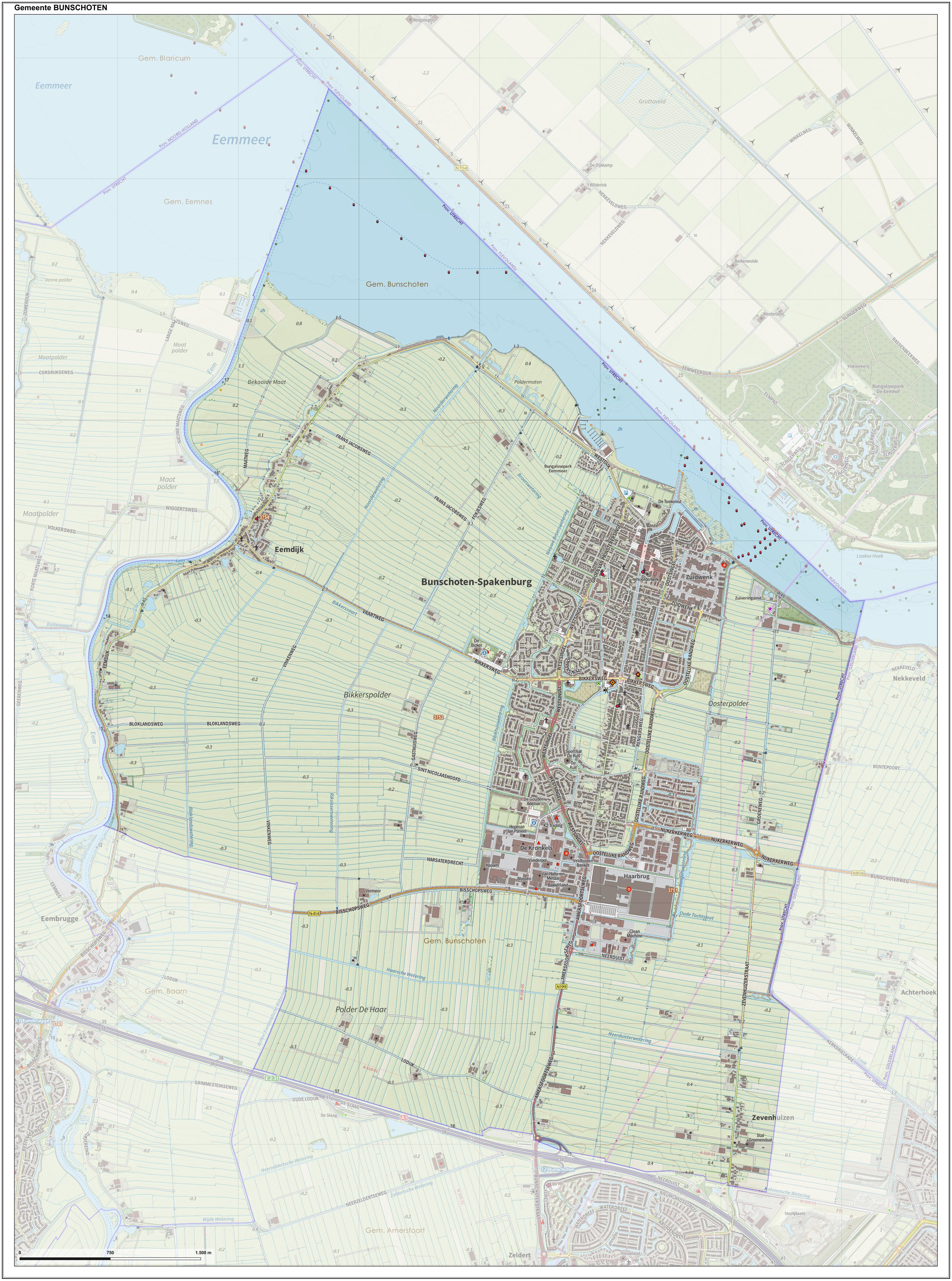
Dutch Topographic map of the municipality of Bunschoten, June 2015.

Bunschoten (pronounced [ˈbʏnsxoːtə(n)]) is a municipality and a town in the Netherlands, in the province of Utrecht. It lies about 7 km north of Amersfoort. Its territory comprises the original municipality of Bunschoten (created in 1204 by the bishop of Utrecht) and the former municipality of Duyst, De Haar and Zevenhuizen, which was a part of Hoogland from 1854 until 1971.

== History ==
Bunschoten was first named in 1294. It was located on the border between Utrecht and Guelders, and it suffered a number of times from invasions from Guelders. In 1383, the bishop of Utrecht gave Bunschoten city rights, which allowed the citizens to build an earthen wall around the town. The fortifications and a part of the town were destroyed at Christmas 1427 in a war between two rival bishops, and were never rebuilt.

== Population centres ==
The municipality of Bunschoten consists of the settlements of:

- Bunschoten
- Eemdijk
- Spakenburg
- Zevenhuizen

== Notable people ==
- Bert Groen (born 1945 in Haarlem) a Dutch politician, former mayor of Bunschoten
- Melis van de Groep (born 1958 in Bunschoten) a Dutch politician, Mayor of Bunschoten from 2006 to 2024
- Job Koelewijn (born 1962 in Spakenburg) a Dutch conceptual artist, sculptor, installation artist, performance artist and photographer
- Kevin van Diermen (born 1989 in Spakenburg) a Dutch professional footballer with over 200 club caps
- Aileen de Graaf (born 1990 in Spakenburg) a Dutch darts player playing in the British Darts Organisation.

== Gallery ==
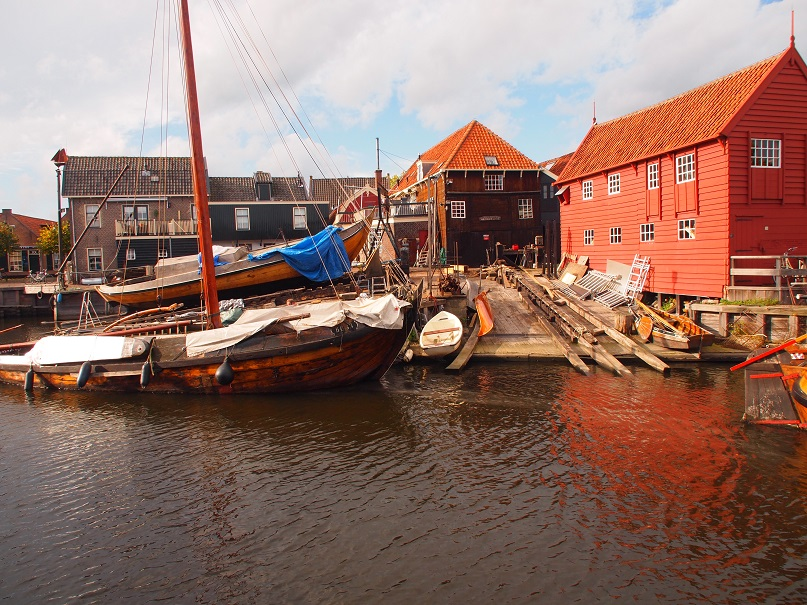
Old boat wharf of Spakenburg, 2013

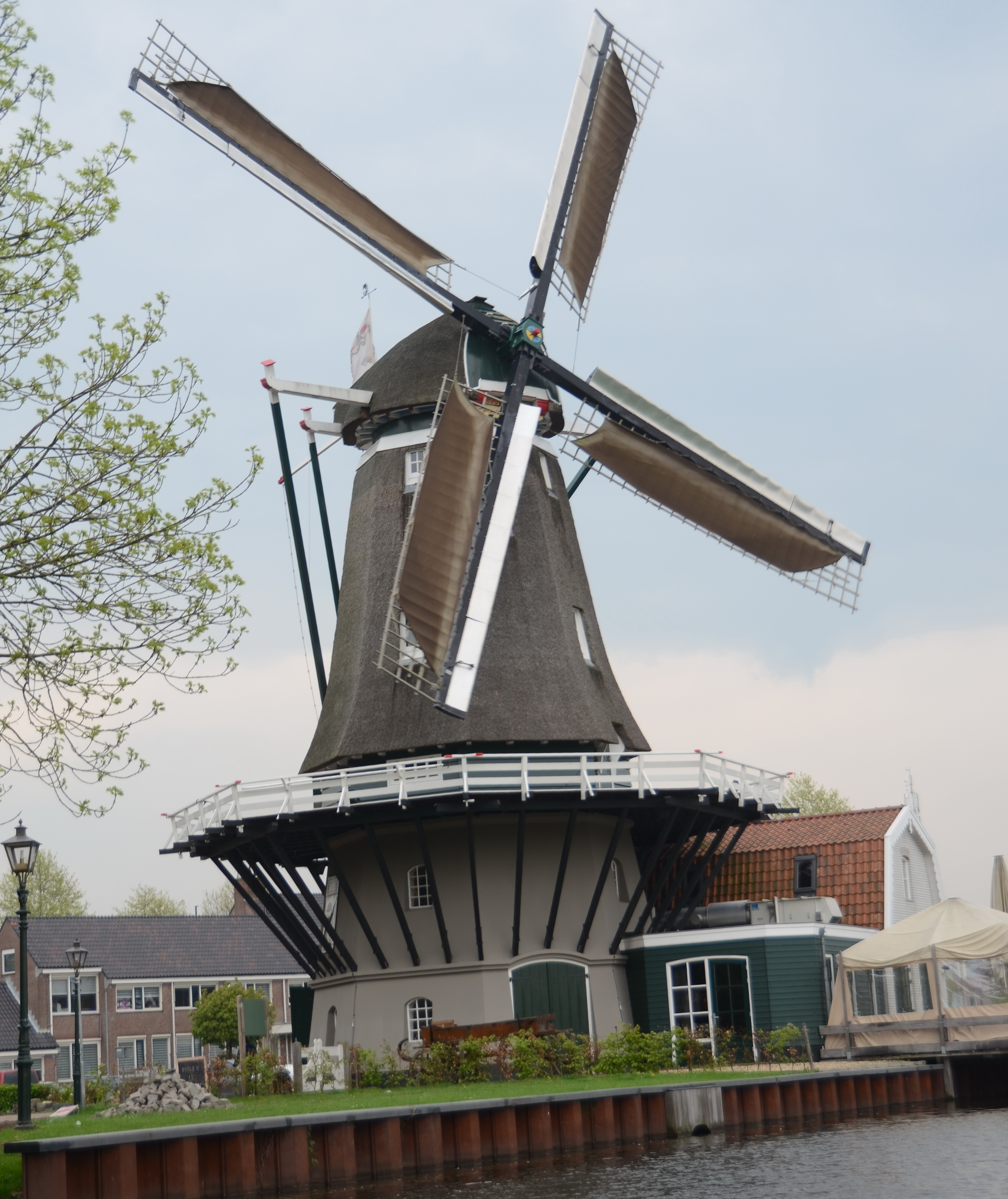
Flourmill De Hoop (1899, rebuilt 2009) at Bunschoten-Spakenburg

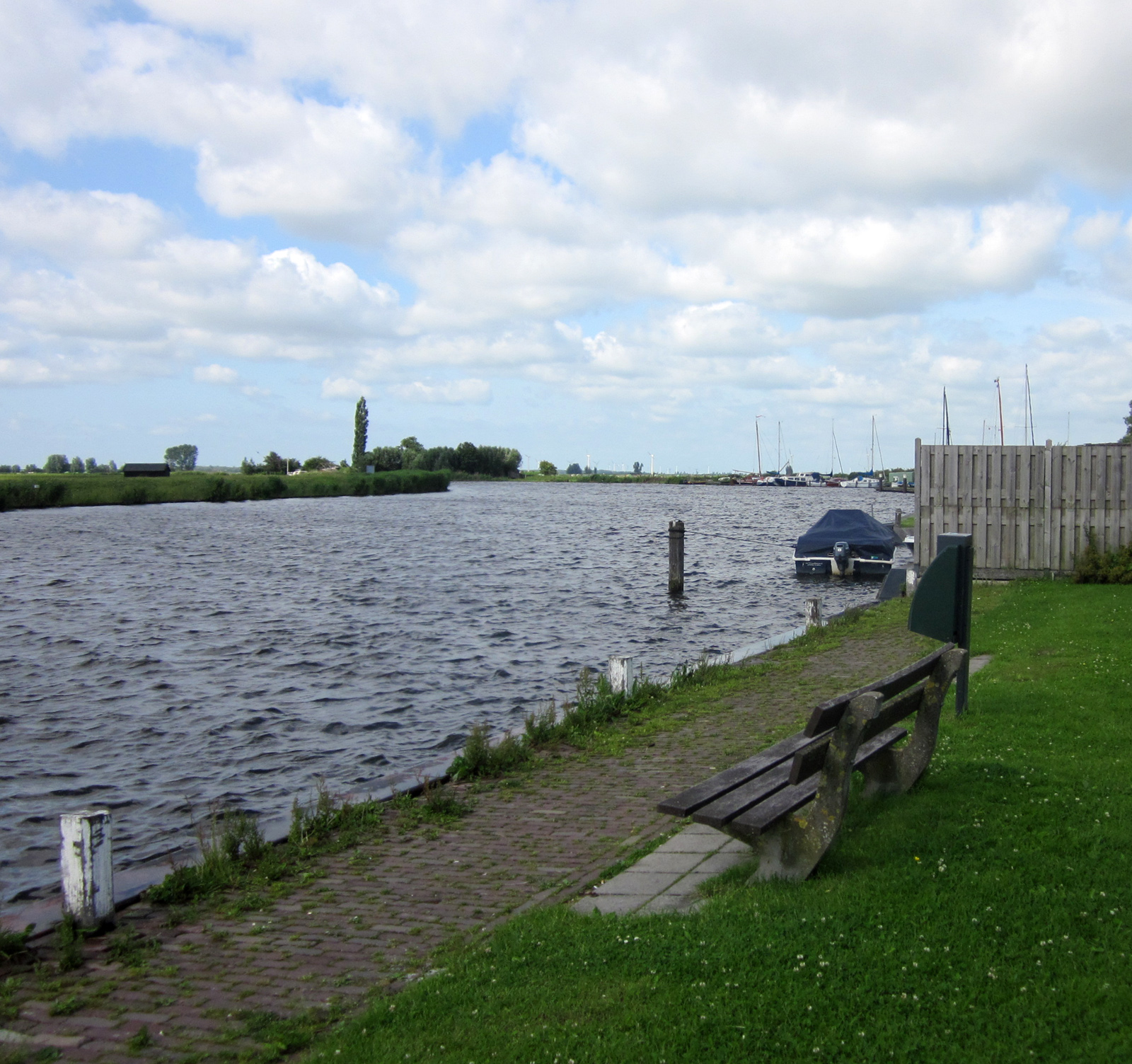
Eem river at Eemdijk, looking north.

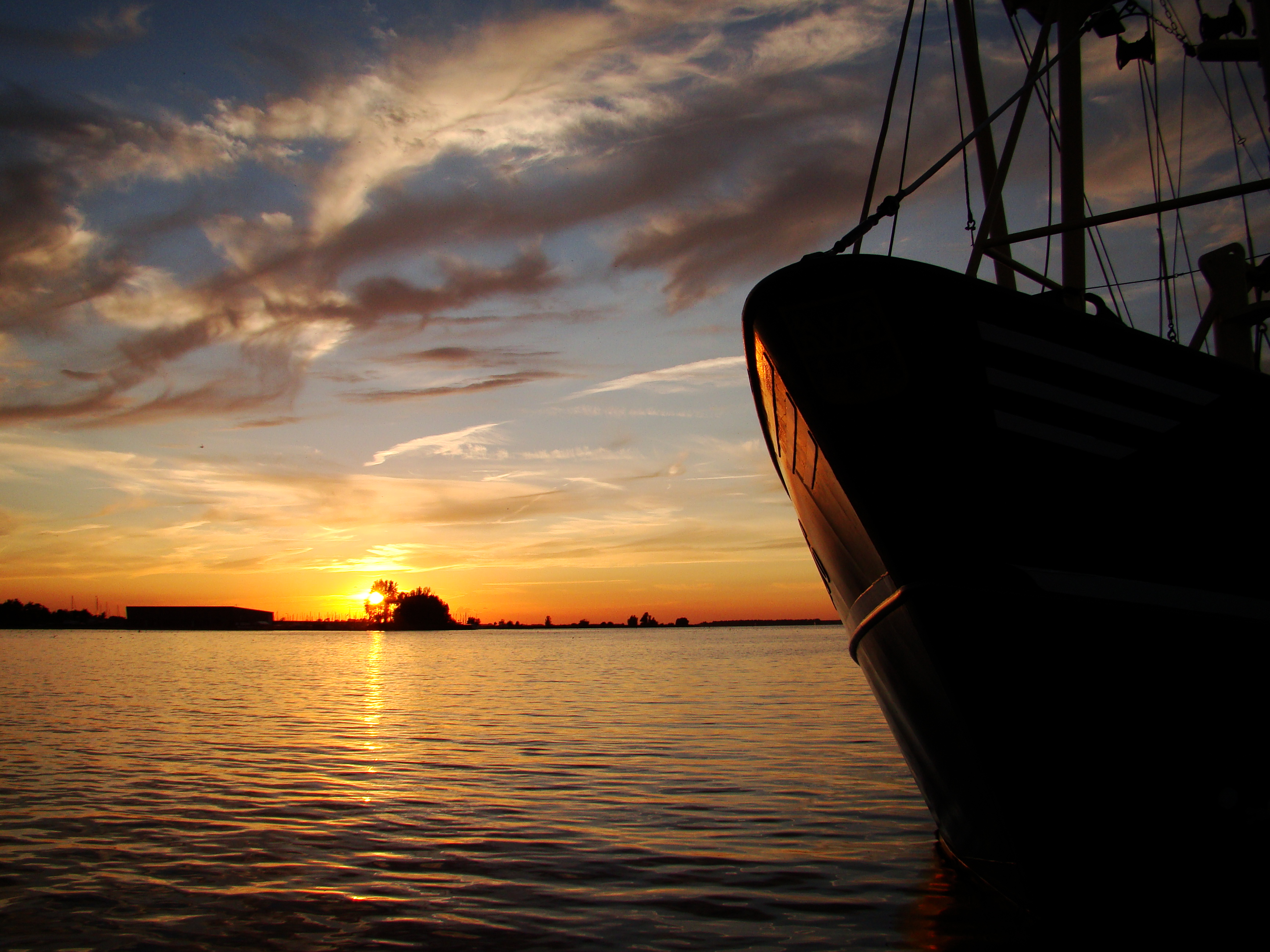
Fishing boat in the dock in Bunschoten at sunset

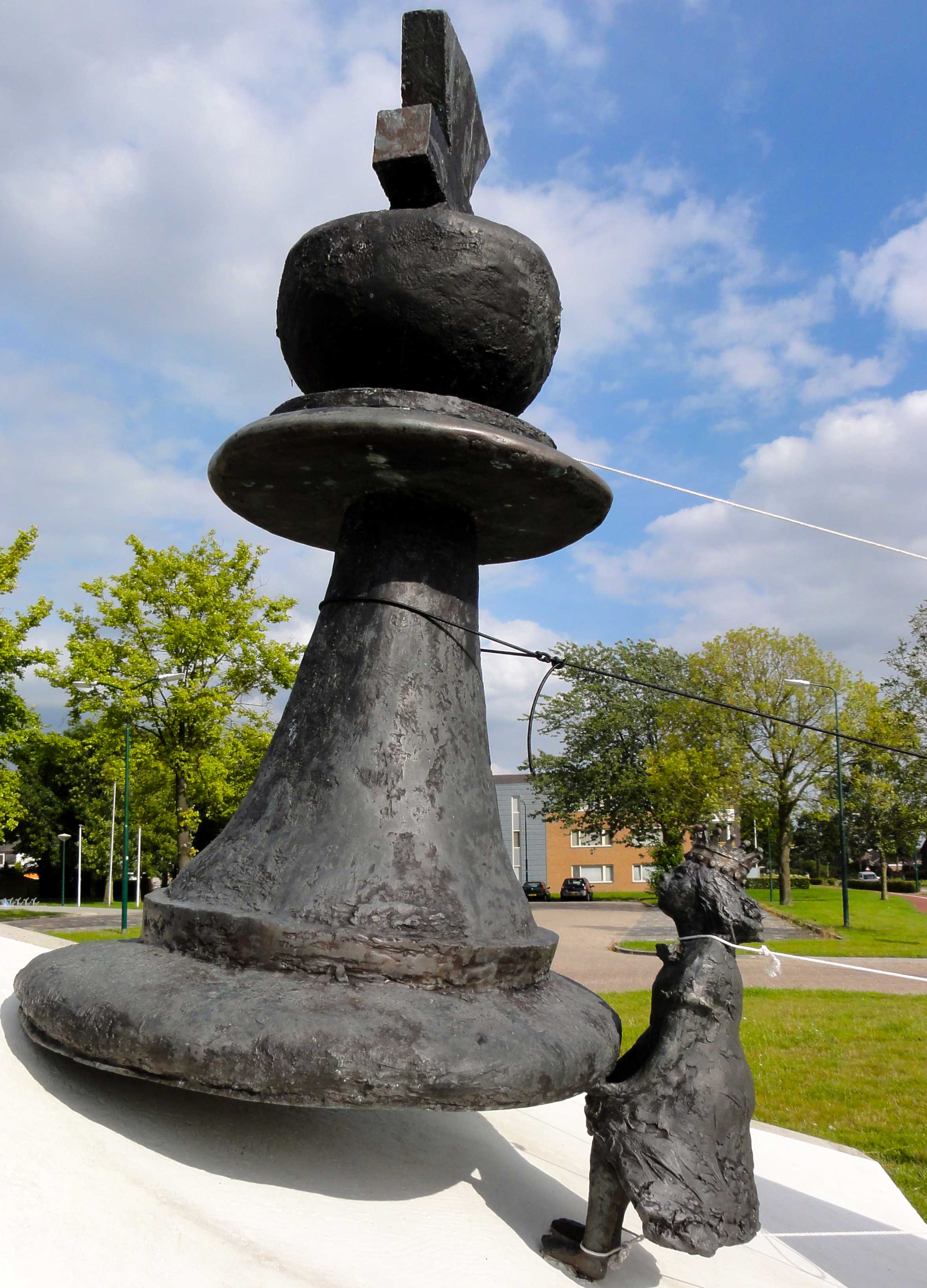
Alice versus King Peter the Lion Bunschoten-Spakenburg
