= Salima Belhaj =

Dutch-Moroccan politician (born 1978)

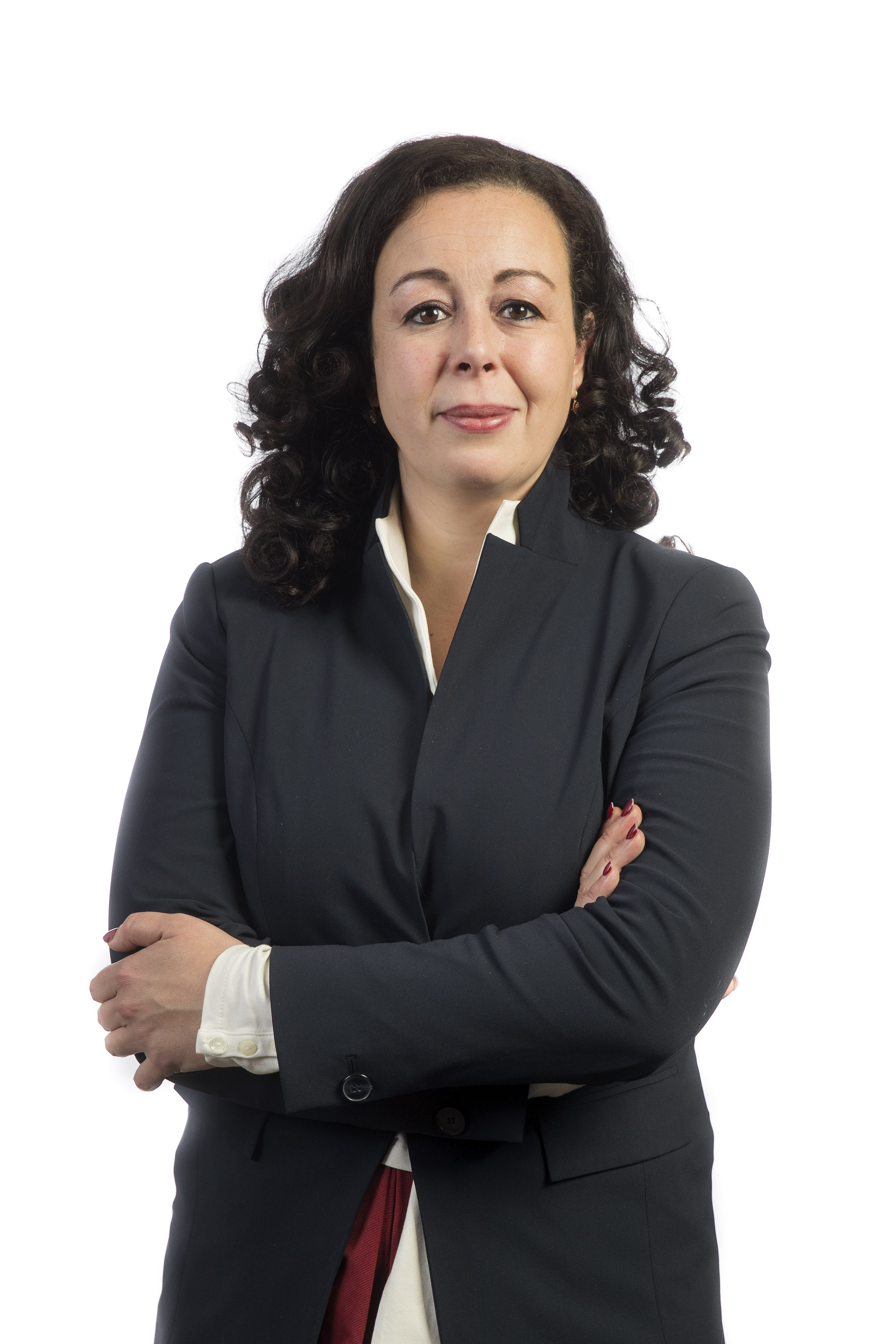

Member of the House of Representatives
- In office 26 January 2016 – 5 December 2023

Personal details
- Born: 18 October 1978 (age 47) Harderwijk, Netherlands
- Citizenship: Netherlands • Morocco
- Party: Democrats 66
- Education: Rotterdam University of Applied Sciences

Salima Belhaj (born 18 October 1978) is a Dutch-Moroccan politician. She has been a member of the House of Representatives of the Netherlands for the Democrats 66 (D66) from 2016 to 2023. She previously served as a municipal councillor and group president in Rotterdam between 2008 and 2016.

== Career ==
Belhaj was born on 18 October 1978 in Harderwijk. She is of Moroccan descent, her father was a social worker. Belhaj moved to Rotterdam for her studies of Personnel and Work at the Rotterdam University of Applied Sciences, which she followed between 1998 and 2002. From 2004 to 2007 she was a personnel coordinator at the Museum Boijmans Van Beuningen. She worked as business leader of the De Appel theatre from 2007 to 2008. From 2008 until January 2016 she was head of personnel of the Scapino Ballet.

Belhaj was number 10 on the D66 candidate list for the 2006 general election. She was member of the municipal council of Rotterdam for the Democrats 66 between January 2008 and January 2016. During this period she also was fraction leader. When Belhaj started she was the only council member for Democrats 66. During her later years in the council Democrats 66 became part of the municipal ruling coalition. On 26 January 2016 Belhaj became a member of the House of Representatives, when she replaced Wassila Hachchi. In the House she deals with topics as defence, harbors and infrastructure.

In October 2018, after Alexander Pechtold announced his departure as parliamentary leader in the House of Representatives, Belhaj was candidate to succeed him but lost to Rob Jetten. In 2021, she announced she would like to renounce her Moroccan passport, although she cannot do so by Moroccan law.

== Electoral history ==
Electoral history of Salima Belhaj
Year	Body	Party	Pos.	Votes	Result		Ref.
Year	Body	Party	Pos.	Votes	Party seats	Individual	Ref.
2006	House of Representatives	Democrats 66	10	763	3	Lost	
2012	House of Representatives	Democrats 66	15	2,345	12	Lost (Note: Belhaj was appointed to the body later during the term due to a vacancy.)	
2017	House of Representatives	Democrats 66	14	13,833	19	Won	
2021	House of Representatives	Democrats 66	6	15,414	24	Won	
2023	House of Representatives	Democrats 66	13	5,989	9	Lost	
