= Farshad Bashir =

Dutch tax adviser and former politician (born 1988)

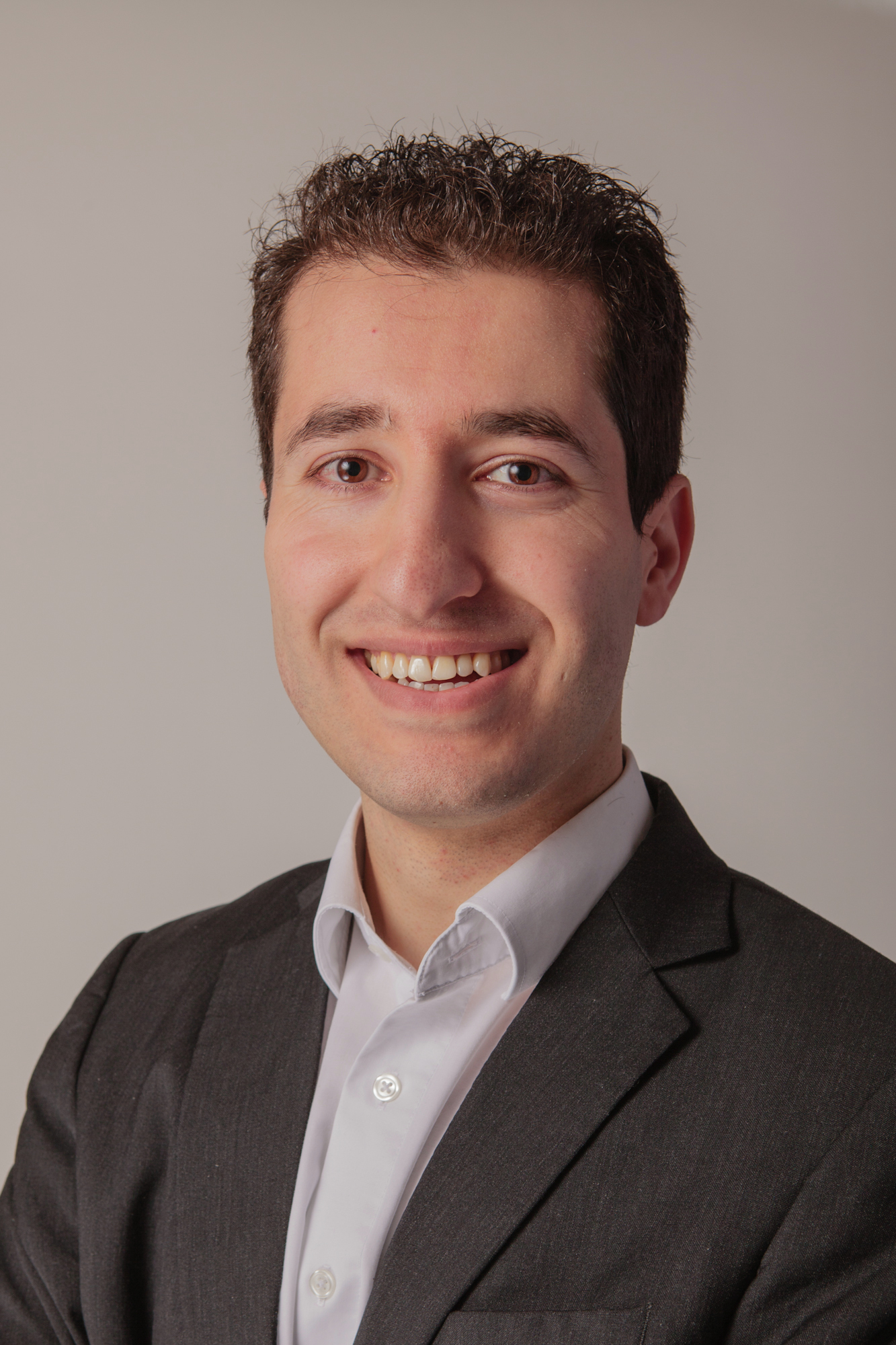

Member of the House of Representatives
- In office 15 January 2008 – 23 March 2017

Personal details
- Born: 14 January 1988 (age 38) Kabul, Afghanistan
- Party: Socialist Party (2002–2017)
- Education: Erasmus University Rotterdam (BSc)
- Occupation: Tax adviser
- Website: https://farshadbashir.nl

Farshad Bashir (born 14 January 1988) is a Dutch tax adviser and former politician. From 2008 to 2017, he served as a member of the House of Representatives for the Socialist Party. During his parliamentary career, he focused on taxation, transport and housing.

== Biography ==
His father worked as a journalist for the daily Anis in Kabul. In 1997, after the Taliban had taken control of much of Afghanistan, Bashir left the country, travelling via Herat and several former Soviet republics. During the journey, his father continued with his sons to the Netherlands, where they settled. His mother joined them a year later through family reunification. The family settled in Mantgum, a village in the province of Friesland.

== Political career ==
On 10 July 2002, he became a member of the Socialist Party and of its youth organisation ROOD. On 16 March 2006 he was elected into the municipal council of Leeuwarden. He was a councillor until 28 January 2008. In the same month he became a member of the Dutch House of Representatives, succeeding Rosita van Gijlswijk. At the age of twenty years and one day, he became the youngest member of the Dutch House of Representatives ever.

In January 2017, Bashir was named to the Forbes 30 Under 30 Europe list in the Law & Policy category.

His term in the House ended on 23 March 2017.

Ahead of the inauguration of Willem-Alexander as king in 2013, Bashir stated that he would refuse to swear an oath of loyalty to the new monarch. Bashir described himself as a republican and opposed the Dutch monarchy.

His membership of the Socialist Party ended on 31 December 2017.

== Career after politics ==
After leaving the House of Representatives, Bashir began working as a self-employed tax adviser in April 2017. From October 2024 until 31 August 2026, he worked as a strategic adviser at the Amsterdam regional transport authority.

== Education ==
Bashir studied mathematics and physics at the University of Groningen, but did not complete those programmes. From September 2018 to August 2022, he studied business administration at Erasmus University Rotterdam, where he obtained a Bachelor of Science degree.
