= Rosita van Gijlswijk =

Dutch politician (born 1974)

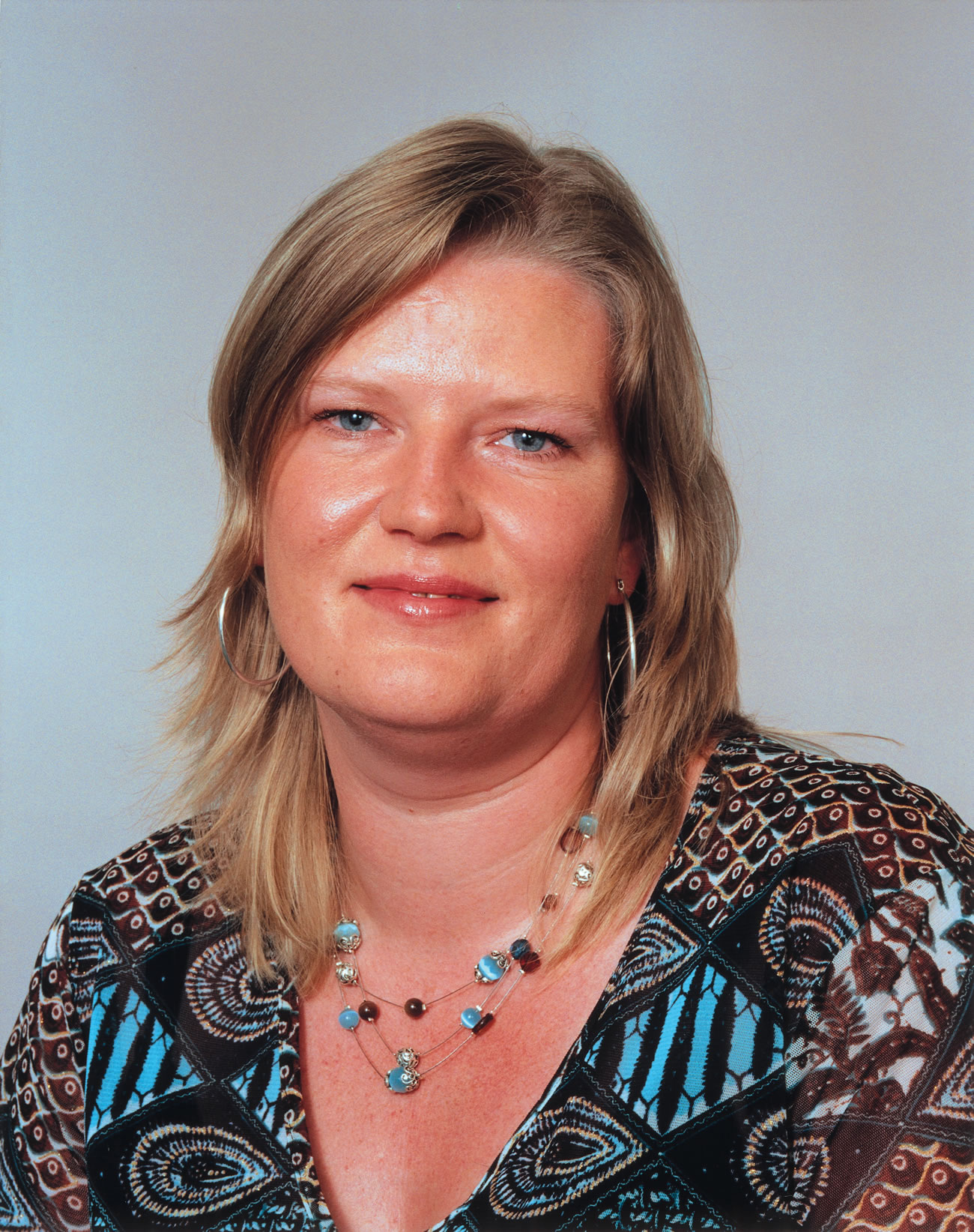
Rosita van Gijlswijk

Lia Rosita van Gijlswijk (born 11 February 1974, Noordwijkerhout) is a Dutch politician of the Socialist Party (SP). She was an MP from 2006 to 2008; she was succeeded by Farshad Bashir. From 1999 to 2006, she was a member of the municipal council of Groningen; since 2008, she has again been a councillor of this municipality. In 2007, she was appointed SP treasurer.
