= Jules Kortenhorst =

Dutch politician and business executive

Jules Timotheus Hendrikus Maria Kortenhorst is a Dutch politician and business executive. He represented the Christen Democratisch Appèl (CDA) in the Dutch House of Representatives from 2006 to 2008. Kortenhorst was also a co-founder of the European Climate Foundation and was involved in various green energy initiatives.

== Biography ==
Kortenhorst obtained a general economics degree from Erasmus University in Rotterdam in 1984. He later completed his master's in business administration (MBA) at Harvard University Business School. After graduating, he was employed at McKinsey for a brief period and left to work for Shell from 1986 to 1994. At one point, he became the general manager of Shell Bulgaria. Some of the key posts he held include the CEO for International Operations of ClientLogic Corporation and the Rocky Mountains Institute (RMI), where he served for nearly a decade.

Kortenhorst is cited as the founding CEO of the European Climate Foundation, which is considered the largest philanthropic organization pushing for policy development on climate change in Europe. This organization was founded in 2008 and has launched initiatives that facilitated discourse on clean energy revolution in the Netherlands and Europe. One of its key contributions was the roadmap for decarbonizing the European electricity network by 2050. It is said to have laid the groundwork for the European Union's mid-century pathway.

Kortenhorst is also a founding member of the Energy Transitions Commission (ETC) a coalition that supports the shift to cleaner energy. He currently serves as co-chair of the organization.

In 2006, Kortenhorst was elected to the Dutch House of Representatives, having been ranked 41st on the CDA's candidate list. His record in the parliament shows how his policymaking work focused on innovation and fiscal issues.

== Personal life ==
Kortenhorst is married to Searl Vetter, and the couple has four children. He is a cousin to Roland Kortenhorst, a Dutch politician who also served in the House of Representatives from 2002 to 2008. The former House Speaker Rad Kortenhorst was also his great-uncle.
