= Melis van de Groep =

Dutch politician

Melis van de Groep (born 4 March 1958 in Bunschoten) is a retired Dutch politician of the ChristianUnion party, and its predecessor, the Reformed Political League (GPV).

He served as the Mayor of Bunschoten from 2006 to 2024, when he stood down for health reasons.

Van de Groep was a municipal councillor as well as an alderman of Bunschoten, and a member of the provincial parliament of Utrecht between 2001 and 2007.

He belongs to the Reformed Churches in the Netherlands (Liberated).
