= Ad Bos =

Dutch entrepreneur and whistleblower

- Born: 9 June 1948 (age 78); Velsen, Netherlands
- Occupation: construction entrepreneur
- Employer: Koop Tjuchem (1985–1998)
- Political party: Ad Bos Collective (2006)
- Spouse: Joke Bos

Ad Bos (born 9 June 1948) is a Dutch construction entrepreneur and whistleblower. He became known for his role in revealing a major construction fraud scandal, which involved large scale price-fixing and defrauding the Dutch government by construction companies.

== Early life ==
Bos was born on 9 June 1948 in Velsen, the son of a contractor. Bos's grandfather was also a contractor and had founded a construction company in Amstelveen. When Bos was eighteen, his father suffered a heart attack, after which his grandfather sold the company.

Bos studied civil engineering at a Higher Technical School (HTS), and worked for various construction companies starting in 1971. In the early 1980s, he worked at the road construction company De Moel, where he first met Fred Veerman. On October 7, 1985, Bos and Veerman founded Koop Tjuchem together, which became the road construction arm of Koop Holding. Bos became its technical director. He regularly took civil servants to brothels or on trips abroad to extract information or in order to place them in a compromised position. Over time, the collaboration began to falter. From October 1997, Bos worked for Koop Tjuchem on Sint Maarten following a conflict with Veerman. However, the conflict continued to fester, and on December 1, 1998, Bos was fired. In 1998, according to Bos, he discovered a so-called "shadow ledger" at his home, which had been tied to his front door in two garbage bags. This ledger recorded the settlements that construction companies passed to one another as part of illegal price-fixing. In early 1999, Bos decided to contact the Dutch Public Prosecution Service (OM). Negotiations regarding compensation, which Bos labeled an expense allowance for guiding the authorities through the case. Bos asked for three hundred thousand guilders, but the OM was unwilling to go beyond 50 thousand.

On November 9, 2001, Bos went public in an episode of the documentary program Zembla, and on November 13, he handed over the shadow ledger to the Justice Service without demanding any compensation, according to his own account, just to get it over with. After the Zembla broadcast, calls arose for a parliamentary inquiry.

== Parliamentary inquiry ==
On 22 August 2002, the parliamentary inquiry into the construction fraud commenced, primarily based on the "shadow ledger" provided by Bos. Bos himself was questioned on September 5 of that year. However, he was unable to substantiate his claims regarding large-scale corruption among civil servants.

Bos subsequently advised the municipalities of Amsterdam and Hoorn regarding construction fraud, but he received no fee for his services. Bos was unable find a job in the construction sector and had to borrow money from his family, and was forced to put his villa in Limmen up for sale.

Based on data provided by Ad, his brother Cok Bos published the book Bouwfraude in 2002.

On 18 March 2004, Bos wrote a letter to Prime Minister Jan Peter Balkenende requesting compensation for his role as a whistleblower. On 7 June, the Prime Minister wrote in a letter to Bos that the Board of Prosecutors General saw no reason to grant Bos's request for financial compensation, reminding Bos that he was still considered a suspect. A few weeks later, an announcement was made that Bos would be prosecuted for bribery.

On 14 October 2004, Bos founded the Moral Awareness Foundation together with fellow whistleblower Floor Drost. The foundation aimed to allow whistleblowers to raise issues anonymously and provide psychological, legal, and financial support to whistleblowers.

== Legal issues ==
Bos was sentenced to a suspended prison term on 11 February 2005 for bribing a public official. On 17 February, he was arrested on suspicion of perjury, after having made conflicting statements during his interrogation and during the trial.

On 11 April 2005, reports emerged a former employee of Bos's former employer Koop Tjuchem had stated to the police that Bos had stolen the shadow accounts from an accountant's home in 1999. The employee and Bos's brother allegedly stood outside keeping watch. The accountant was not at home and had left the door of his house open because a paver had been working in his garden. The accountant had filed a report at the time and also identified Bos as a suspect.

During the appeal hearing in the corruption case on June 2, 2008, Bos again denied bribing the public official. Bos demanded acquittal in the case. The appeal hearing continued in October 2008. On November 5, 2008, it was announced that the ruling was expected in a few weeks. As a result, some of the offenses, including a golf trip to Switzerland and a visit to the Yab Yum brothel in 1996, might have become time-barred, as a twelve-year statute of limitations had since come into effect.

Bos took part in the 2006 Dutch general election in all provinces except Drenthe, Zeeland, and eastern North Brabant with his own party, the Ad Bos Collective. The Ad Bos Collective considered itself neither left-wing nor right-wing, and sought to end what it deemed "nepotism" within contemporary Dutch politics and win back the trust of the Dutch people. The party failed to win enough votes to secure a seat in the Dutch House of Representatives.

In 2007, Bos was forced to sell the house he had built after previously selling his villa due to financial difficulties. Bos had subsequently lived with his wife Joke in a camper on the outskirts of Egmond. Following an article in De Volkskrant, Bos was offered alternative accommodation.

In early 2009, Minister Guusje ter Horst signed a decision regarding compensation for Ad Bos. Bos had demanded over ten million euros, but the amount the State is paying him has not been disclosed. Due to the compensation, Bos was also able to move out of his camper after two years.

In 2010, the Dutch Supreme Court ruled that Bos could be prosecuted after all and referred the case back to the Amsterdam Court of Appeal. However, in 2013, following consultation with Bos and his lawyer, the OM decided that criminal prosecution was no longer necessary as the case had dragged on for too long. Consequently, in December of that year, the District Court in Amsterdam decided to declare the prosecution inadmissible, ending the legal proceedings.
