= Tiny Kox =

Dutch politician

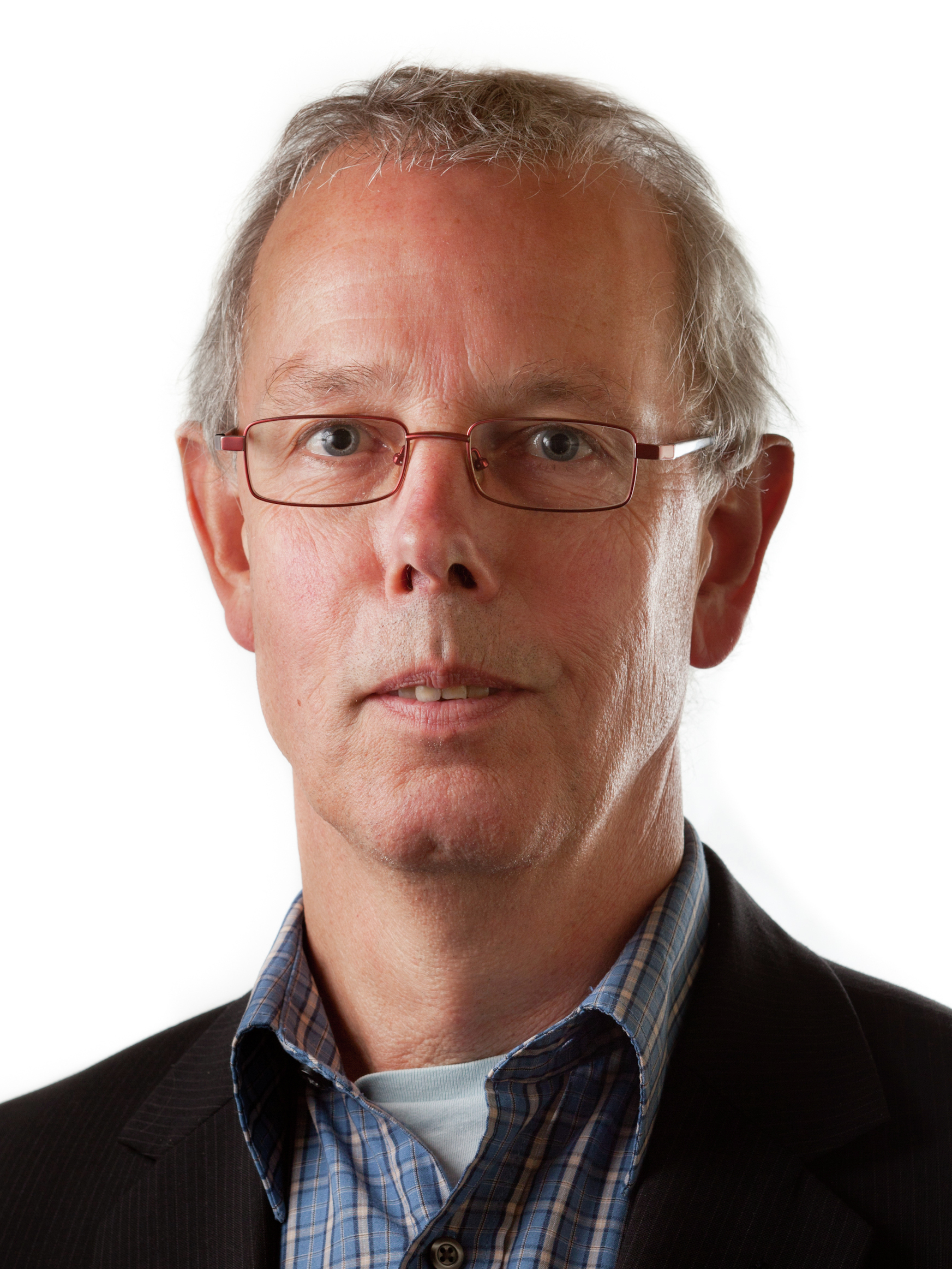
- Kox in 2012

Leader of the Socialist Party in the Senate
- In office 10 June 2003 – 25 January 2022
- Succeeded by: Rik Janssen

Member of the Senate
- In office 10 June 2003 – 13 February 2024
- Succeeded by: Lies van Aelst

Personal details
- Born: Martinus Josephus Maria Kox; 6 May 1953 (age 73) Zeelst, Netherlands
- Party: Socialist Party
- Education: Tilburg University (LLB)
- Occupation: Politician

Martinus Josephus Maria "Tiny" Kox (Dutch: [ˈtini ˈkɔks]; born 6 May 1953) is a Dutch politician who served as President of the Parliamentary Assembly of the Council of Europe from 2022 until 2024. As a member of the Socialist Party (SP), he became a senator on 10 June 2003. He stepped down in February 2024, by which time he had become the longest-serving incumbent member of the Senate.

On 24 January 2022, he was elected the President of the Parliamentary Assembly of the Council of Europe (PACE), initially for a one-year term. Prior to this, he was for several years the President of the Unified European Left Group in the Assembly, where he has been a member since 2003.

== Early career ==
In 1973 Kox finished an economical-judicial study programme at the School for Higher Economics & Administrative Sciences in Eindhoven. After which, in 1975, he got his bachelor of law-degree at Tilburg University, which ended his law study. From 1975 to 1982 he worked at the Tilburg law centre, at which point in time he was already an active member of the SP.

== Political career ==
=== Party activities ===
In 1981 he became editor-in-chief of Tribune, SP's member party magazine, while in the same year he was also appointed to the executive committee of the party. In 1982, he was elected to the Tilburg municipal council, where he served as the head of the local SP-group until 1999.

In 1993, he became the General Secretary of the SP, the highest position in the executive branch of the party. Together with Jan Marijnissen, Kox lead the party. With Marijnissen focusing on the 1994 Dutch general election, and Kox focusing on daily party-business, the duo transformed the party from a minor left-wing political group to a modern socialist party.

On top of being the General Secretary, Kox was also the face of the party during the 1994 European Parliament Election, and the campaign manager during the Dutch general elections from 1994 to 2003.

=== Member of the Dutch senate ===
During the 2003 Dutch Senate elections, Kox was elected to become a Senator. He stepped down as General Secretary of the SP and became head of the SP-faction in the Senate. In 2006, the SP was one of the big winners in the General Election of that year. Kox was initially elected, but decided to stay in the Senate instead.

During his career as a senator, Kox has put through some notable initiatives. Together with senators from the PvdA and the ChristenUnie, he put forward a proposal for the first parliamentary study initiated by the Senate, which resulted in the publication of 'Verbinding verbroken' (Disconnected), a paper on the privatization of government services in the Netherlands. In 2018, Kox put through a proposal that focused on categorically beating back child poverty in the Netherlands.

Furthermore, during the COVID-19 pandemic in 2020, the Senate accepted Kox's proposal to call on the Dutch government to structurally increase the pay of Dutch healthcare workers. In the same year, the Senate accepted a motion of no-confidence on Kox's initiative. Something that is noteworthy, as the Senate up until that point had not accepted a motion of no-confidence in 145 years. The motion was aimed at the Dutch government's policy on rent, and nine months after Kox's motion, the government decided to put a stop to rent increase on all social housing in the Netherlands.

Kox resigned from the Senate effective 13 February 2024. His membership of over 20 years made him the longest-serving incumbent senator at that point.

=== Member of the Parliamentary Assembly of the Council of Europe (PACE) ===
In addition to his work in parliament, Kox was a member of the Dutch delegation to the Parliamentary Assembly of the Council of Europe from 2003 until 2024. He is currently the head of the Unified European Left Group, an alliance consisting of European green and left-wing parties. As the head of this group, he participated in the Presidential Committee, the Bureau and the Standing Committee of the assembly. On behalf of the Assembly he also wrote multiple reports on the Council of Europe. Kox also led multiple missions as an international election-supervisor in Bosnia (2010, 2014), Russia (2011, 2012), Turkey (2015) and Georgia (2020). In 2021, his proposals on strategic priorities for the Council of Europe, were endorsed by the Assembly and presented to the Council of Europe's Committee of Ministers.

In 2011, the Assembly accepted Kox's proposal granting the Palestinian Legislative Council the status of 'partner of democracy', as well as granting them a delegation to the Parliamentary Assembly of the Council of Europe.

On 28 September 2021 Kox was nominated by the UEL-group as President of the Parliamentary Assembly of the Council of Europe for 2022 and 2023, on the basis of the 2008 rotation-agreement between the five political groups in PACE. He was elected President of the Parliamentary Assembly on January 24, 2022. This made him the 34th President since 1949 and the third Dutch national to hold this office.

Immediately after taking office, Kox was confronted with Russia's war of aggression against Ukraine. As President he convened an urgent joint committee meeting with the CM and an extraordinary session of the Assembly, on the basis of which Russia was first suspended, then expelled from the Council of Europe. According to Kox Russia, by invading Ukraine, had crossed the 'red line' of Europe's oldest and broadest treaty organisation, created in the aftermath of World War II to preserve and protect peace by means of peaceful cooperation on the basis of respect for the rule of law, human rights and democracy. Shortly after he was invited by the Speaker of the Verkohvna Rada to Ukraine and was amongst the first leaders of international organisations to visit Ukraine.

According to him, the Russian unilateral aggression underlines the urgent need to organize a new Summit of Heads of State and Government to restore and strengthen effective multilateralism in Europe, in which the Council of Europe has to play a most relevant role. The Summit met on 16 and 17 May 2023 in Reykjavik, Iceland. Assembly-President Kox called at the opening ‘restoring, strengthening and perhaps re-inventing European democratic security and rules- based multilateralism against aggressive unilateralism has become an existential challenge and a main reason to meet here today.’ The Heads of State and Government of the 46 member States decided in Reykjavik on a future roadmap for the Council of Europe, which will celebrate its 75th anniversary in 2024.
