= Lies van Aelst =

Dutch politician (born 1988)

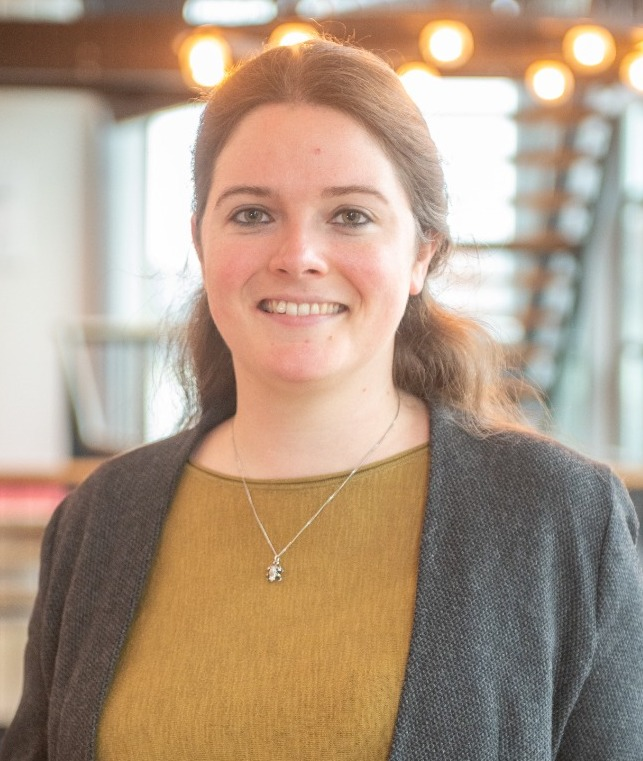
- Van Aelst in 2023

Member of the Senate
- Incumbent
- Assumed office 13 February 2024
- Preceded by: Tiny Kox

Member of the Provincial Council of South Holland
- In office 15 March 2007 – 6 March 2024

Member of the Gorinchem Municipal Council
- In office April 2017 – March 2018

Personal details
- Born: Rosalie den Uijl; 1 December 1988 (age 37) Gorinchem, Netherlands
- Party: Socialist Party
- Education: Erasmus University Rotterdam
- Occupation: Politician

Rosalie "Lies" van Aelst-den Uijl (Dutch pronunciation: [ˈlis fɑn ˈaːlst]; born 1 December 1988) is a Dutch politician of the Socialist Party (SP).

== Early life and career ==
Van Aelst was born in Gorinchem in 1988, and she attended the Merewade College secondary school between 2001 and 2007. She subsequently studied to become Dutch language teacher at the Rotterdam University of Applied Sciences before switching to history at the Erasmus University Rotterdam in 2009. She obtained her bachelor's degree in 2009, and she completed a research master in early modern intellectual history in 2016.

She became a member of the Provincial Council of South Holland in March 2007 on behalf of the SP. Van Aelst also served on the Gorinchem Municipal Council between April 2017 and March 2018. She left the provincial council in early 2024 to became a member of the Senate following the resignation of Tiny Kox. Van Aelst was sworn in on 13 February.

=== Senate committee assignments ===
- Committee on Infrastructure, Water Management and the Environment
- Committee on Agriculture, Nature and Food Quality
- Committee on Social Affairs and Employment
- Committee on Health, Welfare and Sport

== Personal life ==
As of 2024, she is married and lives in Gorinchem.
