= Rik Janssen =

Dutch politician and businessman

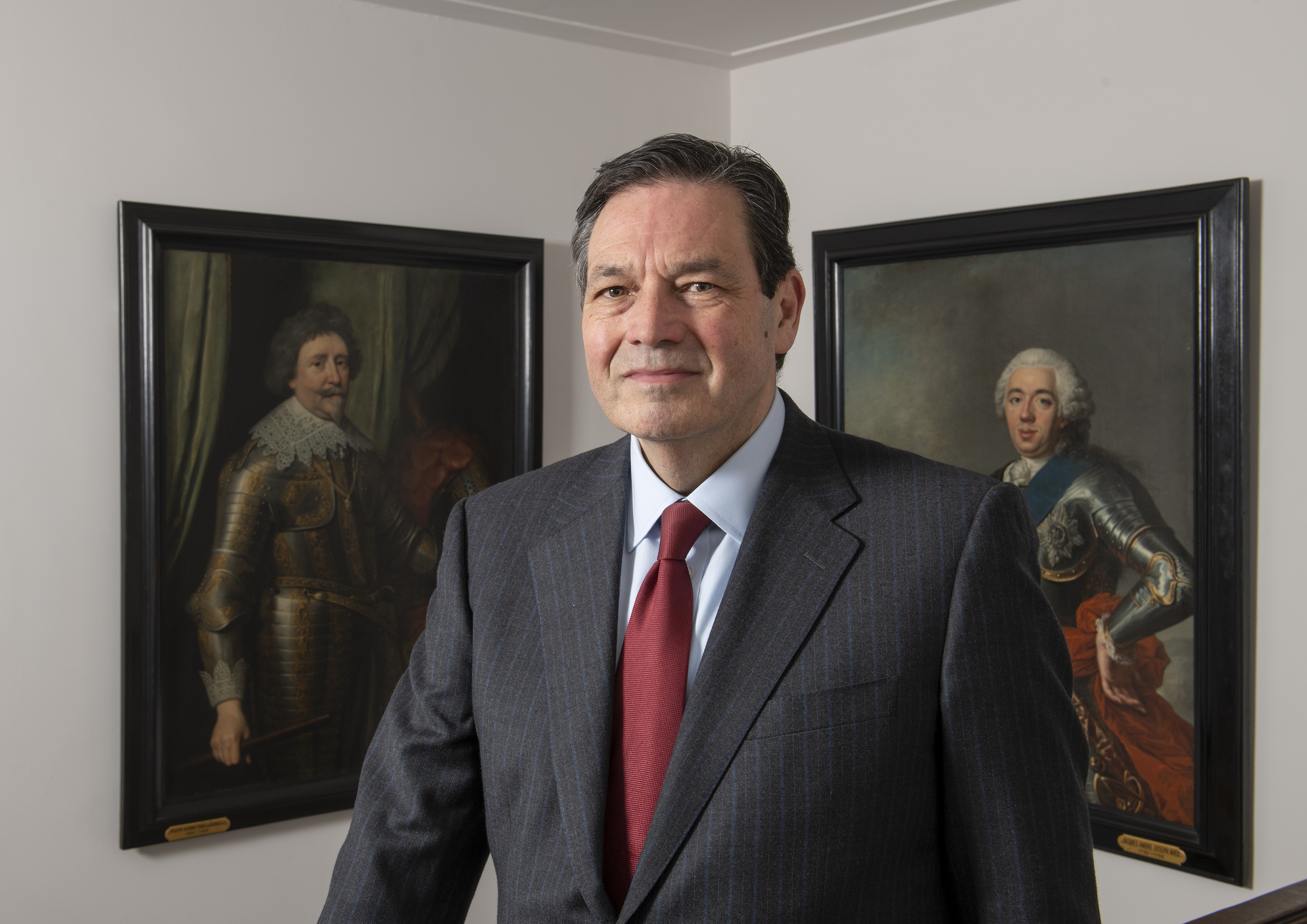
Rik Janssen in 2022

Rik Arend Janssen (born 30 December 1957 in Arnhem) is a Dutch politician for the Socialist Party (SP) and former businessman. As a member of the Socialist Party (Socialistische Partij) he was a temporary MP from 11 January till 14 April 2011, replacing Sadet Karabulut, who was on maternity leave. He focused on matters of security, judiciary, immigration and political asylum. Since 27 April 2011 he has been a member of the States Deputed of the province of South Holland.

He was installed as a member of the Senate on 11 June 2019.

== Life and career ==
Janssen was a catering entrepreneur in Scheveningen. In 1998, he was involved in a serious car accident, which affected both his short and long-term memory. In rehabilitation, he studied law at the Open University. From 2007 to 2011, he was a judicial policy officer for the SP parliamentary party. From 11 January to 14 April 2011, he was a member of the House of Representatives, temporarily replacing Sadet Karabulut.

From 27 April 2011, Janssen was a member of the Provincial Executive in the province of South Holland. From 2011 to 2015, he was in charge of the portfolios of governance, youth care and social development and the environment. Since 2015, he has held the portfolios of Environment, Soil Remediation and Supervision & Enforcement, Water and Water Transport, Cultural Heritage and Society and IPO Governance. During the long formation in South Holland after the Provincial Council elections 2019, Jansen resigned on 11 June in connection with his appointment to the Senate.

In January 2022, he succeeded Tiny Kox as chairman of the SP parliamentary party in the Senate.

Janssen owned a horeca enterprise in Scheveningen. Because of an accident he became disabled and he had to abandon his business. To rehabilitate he studied law at the Open University in the Netherlands and obtained his LLM with Latin honors.
