= Jan de Wit =

Dutch politician and lawyer

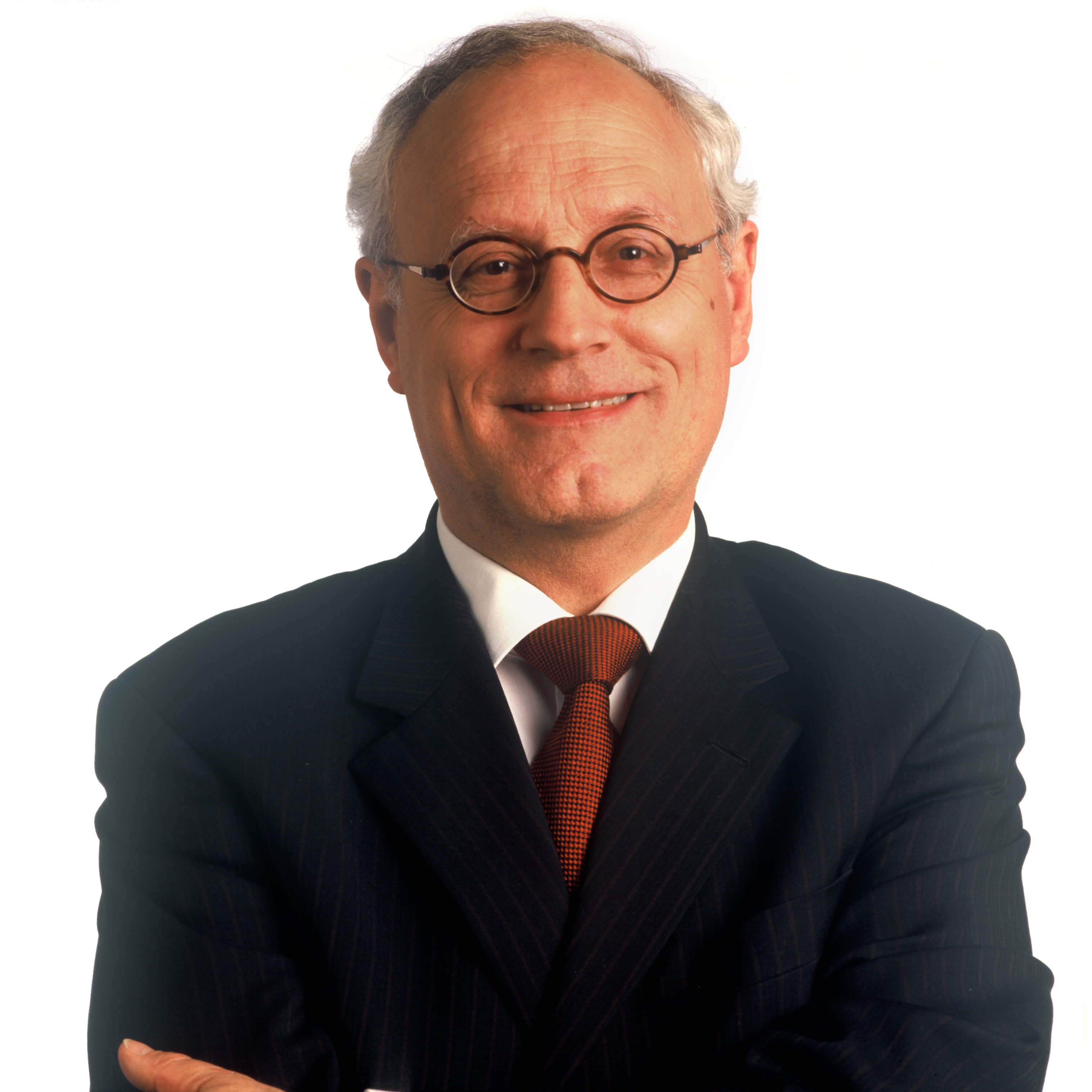

Member of the House of Representatives of the Netherlands
- In office 19 May 1998 – 1 April 2014

Parliamentary leader - Socialist Party Senate of the Netherlands
- In office 13 June 1995 – 19 May 1998

Member of the Senate
- In office 13 June 1995 – 19 May 1998

Personal details
- Born: Johannes Marijnus Antonius Maria de Wit; 10 May 1945 (age 81) Zevenbergen, Netherlands
- Party: Socialist Party (Socialistische Partij - SP)
- Spouse: Riet de Wit
- Education: Tilburg University (LLM - Public law)
- Occupation: Politician; lawyer
- Website: (in Dutch) Socialist Party website

Johannes Marijnus Antonius Maria "Jan" de Wit (born 10 May 1945) is a former Dutch politician and lawyer. As a member of the Socialist Party (Socialistische Partij) he was an MP from 19 May 1998 to 1 April 2014. He focused on matters of judiciary and aliens policy. From 1995 to 1998, he was a Senator.

== Biography ==
de Wit studied public law at Tilburg University. For a brief time, he worked as a lawyer in Eindhoven and thereafter for many years in Maastricht and Heerlen.

In 1972, he joined the Socialist Party, which had just been founded in 1971. From 1972 to 1996, he was a local party executive, and from 1988 to 1992, he was also a party executive on the national level. Furthermore, he was an SP councillor of Heerlen from 1982 to 1995 and chairman of SP's think tank foundation until 1997.

In 1995, de Wit was elected into the Dutch Senate; he was the sole representative of the SP until 1998. In 1998, he exchanged the Senate for the Dutch House of Representatives.

As an MP, de Wit was a member of the parliamentary inquiry on construction, a member of the Presidium and former chairman of the standing committee for social affairs and employment. Since 2010, he has been chairman of the parliamentary inquiry on the financial system.

From 24 June 2009 to October 2010, de Wit was the chairman of the Temporary Committee on Financial System Inquiry, which was to investigate the causes of the 2008 financial crisis.

=== Personal life ===
de Wit is married to Riet de Wit, who is an SP alderwoman in Heerlen. They have three children. Raised as a Catholic, he turned non-religious later on.
