= Ronald van Raak =

Dutch politician (born 1969)

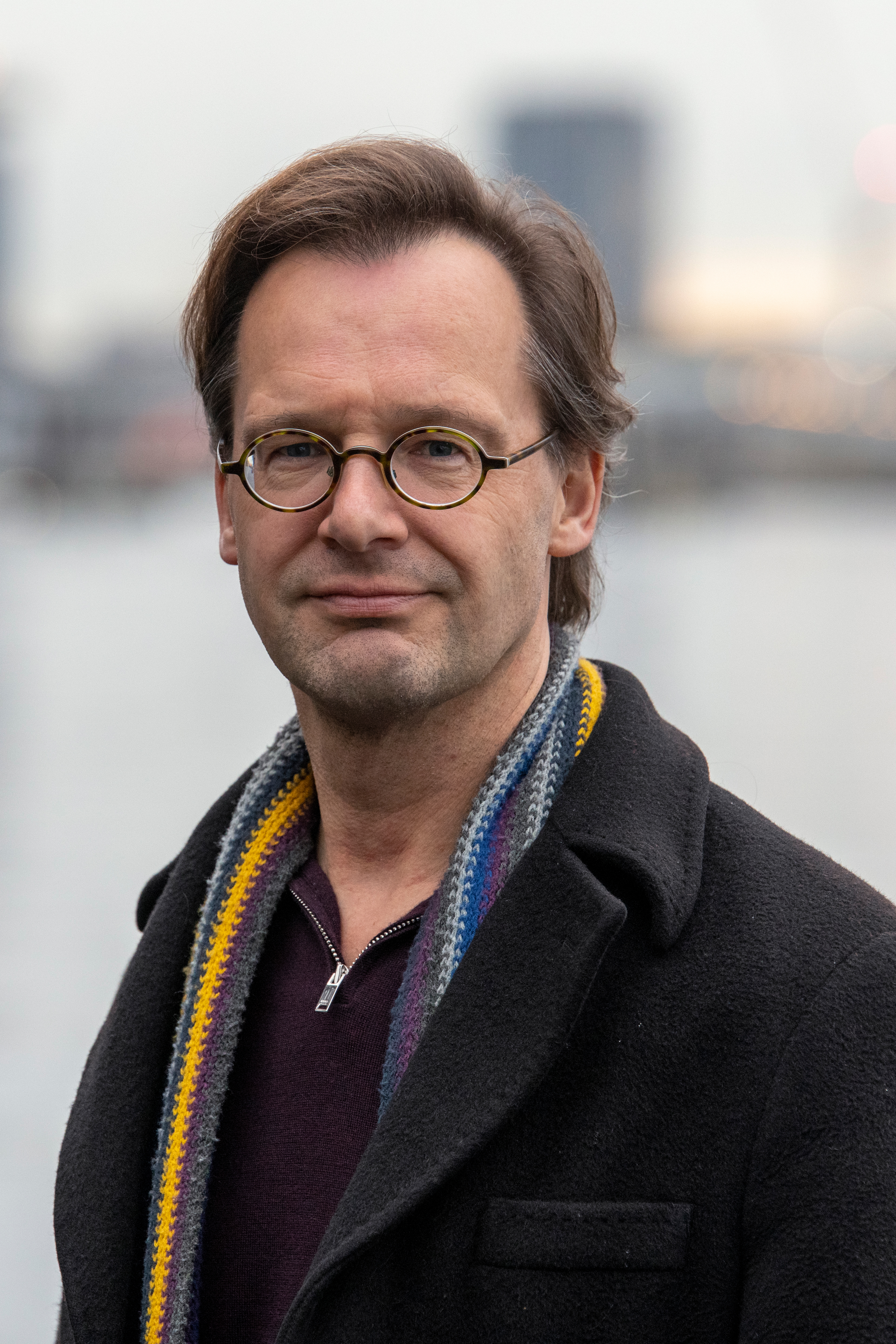

Member of the House of Representatives
- In office 30 November 2006 – 30 March 2021

Member of the Senate
- In office 10 June 2003 – 28 November 2006

Personal details
- Born: Antonius Adrianus Gerardus Maria van Raak; 30 October 1969 (age 56) Hilvarenbeek, Netherlands
- Party: Socialist Party
- Relations: Married
- Education: Erasmus University Rotterdam (MA in Social history, MA in Philosophy); University of Amsterdam (PhD in Humanities)
- Occupation: Politician, non-fiction writer, academic
- Website: (in Dutch) Socialist Party website

Antonius Adrianus Gerardus Maria "Ronald" van Raak (born 30 October 1969) is a Dutch politician, non-fiction writer and former academic. A member of the Socialist Party, he has been a member of the House of Representatives since 30 November 2006. He focuses on matters of home affairs, kingdom relations, the royal house and general affairs. From 2003 to 2006, he was a Senator of the Netherlands.

== Biography ==
Van Raak is of a working-class background; his father was a truck driver. He grew up in his native village and attended secondary education in Tilburg. Afterwards he studied both social history and philosophy at Erasmus University Rotterdam and got promoted in humanities at the University of Amsterdam.

On 1 April 2000 he joined the Socialist Party and started to work at SP's think tank. Three years later he became director.

In 2003 he was elected into the Dutch Senate and was a member from 10 June that year till 28 November 2006. In November 2006 he was elected into the Dutch House of Representatives. The same month he changed positions, instead of being director he became SP's think tank chairman.

From 2001 to 2005 he also taught history at the University of Amsterdam.

== Bibliography ==
- 2011: De Eerste Kamer. De andere kant van het Binnenhof: toen, nu, straks (editor, with Arjan Vliegenthart)
- 2010: Woorden in de strijd (editor, with Sj. van der Velden)
- 2008: Socialisten. Mensen achter de idealen
- 2008: Modern socialisme
- 2006: Het rijke rooie leven. Verhalen over socialisme in Nederland
- 2004: Socialisme, what's left? (editor, essays)
- 2003: Oud licht op nieuwe zaken. Adviezen van Erasmus, Spinoza, Thorbecke, Multatuli, Huizinga en anderen (essays)
- 2001-2003: De uitverkoop van Nederland (with N. Schouten)
- 2001: In naam van het volmaakte: conservatisme in Nederland in de negentiende eeuw van Gerrit Jan Mulder tot Jan Heemskerk Azn. (dissertation)
- 1997: De moderne dwaas. Bertolt Brecht en de moderne zingeving
