= List of candidates in the 2003 Dutch general election =

Prior to the 2003 Dutch general election, contesting parties put forward party lists.

== 1: Christian Democratic Appeal ==
Candidate list for Christian Democratic Appeal
Position	Candidate	Votes	Result
1	Jan Peter Balkenende	2,393,802	Elected
2	Maria van der Hoeven	128,433	Elected
3	Maxime Verhagen	9,615	Elected
4	Clémence Ross-van Dorp	7,881	Elected
5	Pieter van Geel	13,798	Elected
6	Gerda Verburg	6,997	Elected
7	Joop Atsma	18,268	Elected
8	Kathleen Ferrier	3,383	Elected
9	Joop Wijn	3,903	Elected
10	Theo Rietkerk	4,911	Elected
11	Siem Buijs	2,488	Elected
12	Camiel Eurlings	68,526	Elected
13	Theo Meijer	8,129	Elected
14	Agnes van Ardenne-van der Hoeven	2,954	Elected
15	Coşkun Çörüz	1,761	Elected
16	Cees van der Knaap	774	Elected
17	Niny van Oerle-van der Horst	933	Elected
18	Aart Mosterd	1,915	Elected
19	Annie Schreijer-Pierik	16,862	Elected
20	Bas Jan van Bochove	903	Elected
21	Cisca Joldersma	1,241	Elected
22	Sybrand van Haersma Buma	425	Elected
23	Henk de Haan	620	Elected
24	Wim van de Camp	1,163	Elected
25	Nicolien van Vroonhoven-Kok	814	Elected
26	Jan ten Hoopen	407	Elected
27	Mirjam Sterk	1,121	Elected
28	Erik van Lith	1,267	Elected
29	Marleen de Pater-van der Meer	793	Elected
30	Bart van Winsen	1,523	Elected
31	Frans de Nerée tot Babberich	6,367	Elected
32	Roland Kortenhorst	2,300	Elected
33	Jan Mastwijk	2,106	Elected
34	Ger Koopmans	6,501	Elected
35	Nirmala Rambocus	1,427	Elected
36	Henk Jan Ormel	3,776	Elected
37	Liesbeth Spies	863	Elected
38	Jos Hessels	3,402	Elected
39	Antoinette Vietsch	328	Elected
40	Jan de Vries	852	Elected
41	Rikus Jager	1,308	Elected
42	Hubert Bruls	908	Elected
43	Rendert Algra	1,674	Elected
44	Maarten Haverkamp	525	Elected
45	Ine Aasted-Madsen-van Stiphout	2,186	Replacement
46	Wim van Fessem	650	Replacement
47	Myra van Loon-Koomen	1,296	Replacement
48	Margreeth Smilde	1,046	Replacement
49	Jan Jacob van Dijk	346	Replacement
50	Nihat Eski	838	Replacement
51	Pieter Omtzigt	1,010	Replacement
52	Theo Brinkel	292	Replacement
53	Eddy van Hijum	247	Replacement
54	Corien Jonker	538	Replacement
55	Ans Willemse-van der Ploeg	864	Replacement
56	Raymond Knops	6,836	Replacement
57	Rianne Donders-de Leest	714	
58	Hennie Simonse	818	
59	Gerda Kempen-van Dommelen	329	
60	Ton Kamp	992	
61	Henk Mes	497	
62	Corina Kuiper	309	
63	Joost Verheijen	194	
64	Alex Bolhuis	182	
65	Hans Smulders	515	
66	Martine Visser	517	
67	Jet Weigand-Timmer	94	
68	Martha Beuckens-Vries	113	
69	Foka Haitsma	240	
70	Elly Cornelisse-Putter	218	
71	Han Zomer	1,502	
72	Carla Bastiaansen	259	
73	Lenny Geluk-Poortvliet	243	
74	Maud Crooijmans	615	
75	Arie van der Veen	1,033	
Total			

== 2: Pim Fortuyn List ==
Candidate list for Pim Fortuyn List
Position	Candidate	Votes	Result
1	Mat Herben	475,470	Elected
2	Joost Eerdmans	6,918	Elected
3	Margot Kraneveldt	4,189	Elected
4	Gerard van As	1,824	Elected
5	João Varela	16,017	Elected
6	Wien van den Brink	8,677	Elected
7	Max Hermans	1,338	Elected
8	Gonny Koster	1,005	Replacement
9	Vic Bonke	374	
10	Olaf Stuger	225	Replacement
11	Laetitia Simonis	515	
12	Harry Smulders	757	
13	Frits Palm	358	
14	Marcel Teeuw	477	
15	Jan Odink	306	
16	Sven Spaargaren	264	
17	Jaco van Duijn	160	
18	Ton Alblas	189	
19	Marjan van Lambalgen-van Overeem	198	
20	Richard van der Wal	345	
21	Harry Maronier	246	
22	Khee Liang Phoa	432	
23	Elise Boot	282	
24	Pierre Seeverens	1,020	
25	Rick Tersmette	53	
26	Peter Sassen	186	
27	Hans Aniba	38	
28	Bert Herfkens	174	
29	Jan van Ruiten	250	
30	Rob Hessing	375	
31	Olof Wullink	2,933	
32	Hilbrand Nawijn	21,209	
33	Ed Maas	725	
34	Oscar Hammerstein	920	
35	Ruud Both	168	
36	Ton van Dillen	99	
37	Johan van Eijck	162	
38	Andre de Jong	342	
39	Patrick van der Veld	177	
40	Jim Janssen Van Raaij	578	
Total			

== 3: People's Party for Freedom and Democracy ==
Candidate list for People's Party for Freedom and Democracy
Position	Candidate	Votes	Result
1	Gerrit Zalm	1,222,374	Elected
2	Johan Remkes	45,538	Elected
3	Melanie Schultz van Haegen-Maas Geesteranus	59,437	Elected
4	Erica Terpstra	184,828	Elected
5	Annette Nijs	9,002	Elected
6	Henk Kamp	38,934	Elected
7	Frank de Grave	22,732	Elected
8	Jozias van Aartsen	4,534	Elected
9	Frans Weisglas	8,037	Elected
10	Hans Hoogervorst	5,827	Elected
11	Mark Rutte	4,297	Elected
12	Laetitia Griffith	3,297	Elected
13	Clemens Cornielje	1,679	Elected
14	Geert Wilders	4,763	Elected
15	Atzo Nicolaï	1,635	Elected
16	Ayaan Hirsi Ali	30,758	Elected
17	Willibrord van Beek	1,623	Elected
18	Pieter Hofstra	2,722	Elected
19	Charlie Aptroot	1,875	Elected
20	Anouchka van Miltenburg	1,815	Elected
21	Hans van Baalen	710	Elected
22	Jan Rijpstra	1,831	Elected
23	Gert Jan Oplaat	3,219	Elected
24	Bibi de Vries	1,589	Elected
25	Stef Blok	533	Elected
26	Paul de Krom	390	Elected
27	Fadime Örgü	2,097	Elected
28	Jan Geluk	4,403	Elected
29	Frans Weekers	8,966	Replacement
30	Edith Schippers	1,880	Replacement
31	Ineke Dezentjé Hamming-Bluemink	5,032	Replacement
32	Janneke Snijder-Hazelhoff	5,538	Replacement
33	Arno Visser	1,050	Replacement
34	Ruud Luchtenveld	914	Replacement
35	Zsolt Szabó	775	Replacement
36	Eric Balemans	788	Replacement
37	Jelleke Veenendaal	2,048	Replacement
38	Eske van Egerschot	668	Replacement
39	Ed van der Sande	4,734	Replacement
40	Anton van Schijndel	12,731	Replacement
41	Janmarc Lenards	695	Replacement
42	Ingrid Muijs	2,247	
43	John Deighton	1,405	
44-48	Regional candidates		
Total			

=== Regional candidates ===
Regional candidates for People's Party for Freedom and Democracy
Candidate	Votes	Result	Position per electoral district			
Candidate	Votes	Result	Groningen, Leeuwarden, Assen, Zwolle, Lelystad	Nijmegen, Arnhem, Tilburg, 's-Hertogenbosch, Maastricht	Utrecht, Amsterdam, Haarlem, Den Helder	's-Gravenhage, Rotterdam, Dordrecht, Leiden, Middelburg
Jan Dirk Blaauw	327				47	
Laurine Bonnewits-de Jong	258					45
Albert van den Bosch	265				44	
Christel Bottenheft	218				46	
Jan Maurits Faber	288					47
Bart Goeman Borgesius	363		44			
Peter Groenestein	220			46		
Menno Knot	444		48			
Sandra Korthuis	217		46			
Remco Kouwenhoven	320		45			
Karina Kuperus	219					46
Joost Manusama	561					48
Frank Perquin	168		47			
Det Regts	102					44
Marnix de Ridder	938			47		
Renee Spermon-Marijnen	1,417			48		
Annemieke Stallaert	539			45		
Sammy van Tuyll van Serooskerken	309				45	
Jan Verhoeven	571			44		
Frans Zomers	1,013				48	

== 4: Labour Party ==
Candidate list for Labour Party
Position	Candidate	Votes	Result
1	Wouter Bos	2,182,298	Elected
2	Jeltje van Nieuwenhoven	217,715	Elected
3	Klaas de Vries	14,351	Elected
4	Nebahat Albayrak	66,644	Elected
5	Jet Bussemaker	9,305	Elected
6	Jacques Tichelaar	3,830	Elected
7	Jan Boelhouwer	4,281	Elected
8	Marjo van Dijken	12,546	Elected
9	Diederik Samsom		Elected
10	Karin Adelmund		Elected
11	Adri Duivesteijn	2,975	Elected
12	Khadija Arib	13,827	Elected
13	Ferd Crone	933	Elected
14	Ella Kalsbeek	3,069	Elected
15	Bert Koenders	2,180	Elected
16	Sharon Dijksma	6,810	Elected
17	John Leerdam	8,936	Elected
18	Angelien Eijsink	870	Elected
19	Frans Timmermans	7,786	Elected
20	Joanneke Kruijsen	1,807	Elected
21	Aleid Wolfsen	585	Elected
22	Mariëtte Hamer	643	Elected
23	Peter van Heemst	1,058	Elected
24	Gerdi Verbeet		Elected
25	Piet Straub		Elected
26	Godelieve van Heteren	736	Elected
27	Staf Depla	1,088	Elected
28	José Smits	1,001	Elected
29	Niesco Dubbelboer	4,810	Elected
30	Luuk Blom	1,212	Elected
31	Pauline Smeets	10,224	Elected
32	Varina Tjon A Ten	2,491	Elected
33	Jeroen Dijsselbloem	904	Elected
34	Frank Vijg	420	Elected, but declined
35	Saskia Noorman-den Uyl	7,094	Elected
36	Kris Douma	571	Elected
37	Frank Heemskerk	631	Elected
38	Anja Timmer	1,407	Elected
39	Harm Evert Waalkens	8,551	Elected
40	Thea Fierens	430	Elected
41	Martijn van Dam	1,724	Elected
42	Hannie Stuurman	630	Elected
43	Co Verdaas	668	
44	Lia Roefs	1,077	
45	Maria le Roy	1,165	
46	Regional candidates		
Total			

=== Regional candidates ===
Regional candidates for Labour Party
Candidate	Votes	Result	Position per electoral district																		
Candidate	Votes	Result	Groningen	Leeuwarden	Assen	Zwolle	Lelystad	Nijmegen	Arnhem	Utrecht	Amsterdam	Haarlem	Den Helder	Den Haag	Rotterdam	Dordrecht	Leiden	Middelburg	Tilburg	Den Bosch	Maastricht
Nazli Atmac-Yigit	263																	46			
Johan Brongers	620		46																		
Jan Bugter	548					46															
Jan Haverkort	364											46									
Fleur Imming	438									46											
Guus Krähe	214	Replacement						46													
Jannie van der Loos	324															46					
Peter Meijer	300	Replacement									46										
Dominic Schrijer	257														46						
Lies Spruit	257						46														
Jan Stam	502												46								
Jantien Vlam	1,009								46												
Hannie Vlug	80													46							
Hans Wagner	103	Replacement															46				
Oeds Westerhof	628			46																	
Ellen Wöltgens	601																		46		
Jos Zuidgeest	1,023																				46
Wim Zwaan	629				46																
Deniz Özkanli	690																			46	

== 5: GroenLinks ==
Candidate list for GroenLinks
Position	Candidate	Votes	Result
1	Femke Halsema	431,195	Elected
2	Marijke Vos	24,988	Elected
3	Wijnand Duijvendak	3,366	Elected
4	Kees Vendrik	1,331	Elected
5	Farah Karimi	7,610	Elected
6	Evelien Tonkens	1,348	Elected
7	Arie van den Brand	839	Elected
8	Ineke van Gent	4,229	Elected
9	Naima Azough	6,614	Replacement
10	Paul Jungbluth	899	Replacement
11	Hugo van der Steenhoven	566	
12	Nevin Özütok	4,280	Replacement
13	Tineke Strik	796	
14	Arno Bonte	528	
15	Wilna van Aartsen	243	
16	Nen van Ramshorst	202	
17	Doğan Gök	818	
18	Wil Codrington	469	
19	Roel van Duijn	845	
20	Luc Houx	95	
21	Stan Termeer	112	
22	Nelleke van Wijk	616	
23	Farid Tabarki	576	
24	Lenie Scholten	480	
25	Raf Janssen	332	
26	Symone de Bruin	353	
27	Klaas Blanksma	203	
28	Hetty Hafkamp	364	
29	Maya de Bruijn-Reefman	601	
30	Mirjam de Rijk	904	
Total			

== 6: Socialist Party ==
Candidate list for Socialist Party
Position	Candidate	Votes	Result
1	Jan Marijnissen	488,340	Elected
2	Agnes Kant	83,651	Elected
3	Harry van Bommel	4,403	Elected
4	Jan de Wit	4,003	Elected
5	Krista van Velzen	4,694	Elected
6	Piet de Ruiter	854	Elected
7	Ali Lazrak	2,387	Elected
8	Fenna Vergeer-Mudde	1,046	Elected
9	Arda Gerkens	883	Elected
10	Hubert Vankan	2,052	
11	Alejandra Slutzky	1,280	
12	Ewout Irrgang	273	Replacement
13	Hans van Heijningen	513	
14	René Roovers	742	
15	Rosita van Gijlswijk	2,507	
16	Ingrid Dekker	561	
17	Jasper van Dijk	328	
18	Gerard Harmes	219	
19	Ineke Palm	634	
20	Chandra Jankie	601	
21	Henk van Gerven	224	
22	Yorick Haan	176	
23	Mahmut Erciyas	1,123	
24	Tuur Elzinga	156	
25	Paul Geurts	670	
26-30	Regional candidates		
Total			

=== Regional candidates ===
Regional candidates for Socialist Party
Candidate	Votes	Result	Position per electoral district								
Candidate	Votes	Result	Groningen, Leeuwarden, Assen	Zwolle, Nijmegen, Arnhem	Lelystad, Utrecht	Amsterdam, Haarlem, Den Helder	's-Gravenhage, Rotterdam, Dordrecht, Leiden	Middelburg	Tilburg	Den Bosch	Maastricht
Remine Alberts-Oosterbaan	369					30					
Frans Baron	161		27								
Ronald Boorsma	196		26								
Theo Cornelissen	105						26				
Jacqueline Gabriël	466										30
Bernard Gerard	219									29	
Ingrid Gyömörei-Agelink	140						29	28			
Hans van Hooft	77			27							
Jeannette de Jong	88				27						
Gidia Kap	71				26						
Jef Kleijnen	571										27
Tiny Kox	521								30	30	
John Kuijpers	127										28
Edith Kuitert	91						28	27			
Johan Kwisthout	156								27	27	
Paul Lempens	228										29
Willy Lourenssen	67			29							
Fons Luijben	77							30			
Hilde van der Molen	80					28					
Vincent Mulder	259			26							
Hanny Palmen-Lehmann	154		29								
Hugo Polderman	110								29		
Remi Poppe	496						30	29			
Ronald van Raak	33					26					
Petra Relou	205								28	28	
Trix de Roos-Consemulder	171							26			
Bob Ruers	230				30						
Harry Sangers	38				28						
Corry Sciacca-Noordhuis	203		30								
Nora Swagerman	109					27					
Behnam Taebi	84						27				
Margriet Twisterling	206			28							
Alphons Verhoef	60				29						
Cecile Visscher	143								26	26	
Harry Voss	277			30							
Marian de Vroomen	233					29					
Riet de Wit-Romans	409										26
Geert Zondag	173		28								

== 7: Democrats 66 ==
Candidate list for Democrats 66
Position	Candidate	Votes	Result
1	Thom de Graaf	282,550	Elected
2	Lousewies van der Laan	58,588	Elected
3	Boris Dittrich	25,854	Elected
4	Bert Bakker	1,927	Elected
5	Boris van der Ham	4,645	Elected
6	Francine Giskes	4,701	Elected
7	Ursie Lambrechts	2,854	Replacement
8	Fatma Koşer-Kaya	2,601	Replacement
9	Bart Combee	401	
10	Francisca Ravestein	963	
11	Ingrid van Engelshoven	713	
12	Hein Westerouen van Meeteren	458	
13	Thessa van der Windt	363	
14	Vivien van Geen	337	
15	Erik van Buiten	165	
16	Simone Filippini	320	
17	Carel Beynen	81	
18	Lia de Ridder	208	
19	Floor Kist	286	
20	Theo Veltman	133	
21	Jan Bijen	262	
22	John van Ringelenstein	114	
23	Herman Beun	62	
24	Lidwien van Langen	237	
25	Steven Pieters	108	
26-30	Regional candidates		
Total			

=== Regional candidates ===
Regional candidates for Democrats 66
Candidate	Votes	Result	Position per electoral district																		
Candidate	Votes	Result	Groningen	Leeuwarden	Assen	Zwolle	Lelystad	Nijmegen	Arnhem	Utrecht	Amsterdam	Haarlem	Den Helder	Den Haag	Rotterdam	Dordrecht	Leiden	Middelburg	Tilburg	Den Bosch	Maastricht
Marnix van den Berg	91									29						29					
John Bijl	60		30												30						
Rob Blom	94							28	29												
Gerard Bos	72								27					26	26		26				
Gerard Bos	108													27							26
Bert Bosch	43												27				27				
Heidy Bouwmeester-Smit	57					27	28														
Roland de Bruijn	104															28			28		
Marco Bunge	76											29	29								
Ruud Coolen-van Brakel	87							27		27			28								
Adriaan van Geest	108															30	29				
Rineke Gieske-Mastenbroek	290					30						30									
Afran Groenewoud	42										29				28						
Rachid Guernaoui	22				28									29	27						
Annet Habets	215						29														30
Klaas Hamersma	74		29	30																	
Albert de Hoop	181		26	27																	
Lodewijk Imkamp	149																			27	27
Paul de Jongh	11			26	27									28							
Ben Joosse	39																	30		28	
Roel Kusters	72																	29			28
Henk van Lingen	50									28						27					
Ivar Manuel	32						27				28		26								
Dennis van Nieuwenhuijzen	145																	27	27		
Robin de Roon	36													30	29						
Dick Ross	263							29	30												
Frits van der Schans	44						26	26	28												
Bart Slagter	297		27	28																	
Hélène Steenhoff	118										27	26				26					
Iman Stratenus	81					26				26	26										
Marc van Tienen	128																	28	29		
Elaine Toes	234								26			27								26	
Jan Top	352				29	28															
Hans van der Veen	91		28	29																	
André van Wanrooij	144				26													26	26		
Paul Wessels	256							30												29	29
Han Westerhof	35											28					28				
Marion Wichard-den Boggende	101				30	29															

== 8: Christian Union ==
Candidate list for Christian Union
Position	Candidate	Votes	Result
1	André Rouvoet	157,594	Elected
2	Arie Slob	10,281	Elected
3	Leen van Dijke	6,034	
4	Tineke Huizinga-Heringa	19,650	Elected
5	Dick Stellingwerf	2,053	
6	Roel Kuiper	470	
7	Reinier Koppelaar	748	
8	Eise van der Sluis	508	
9	Marien Bikker	231	
10	Annette van Kalkeren	670	
11	Tijmen Duijst	115	
12	Herman Timmermans	183	
13	Olaf van Dijk	208	
14	Flora Lagerwerf-Vergunst	236	
15	David de Jong	812	
16	Joël Voordewind	491	
17	Gerdien Rots	302	
18	Koen de Snoo	145	
19	Paul Blokhuis	209	
20	Adriaan Hoogendoorn	159	
21	Willem Ouweneel	1,921	
22	Dick Schutte	357	
23	Melis van de Groep	223	
24	Hans Valkenburg	130	
25	Jan van Groos	108	
26	Meindert Leerling	228	
27	Janco Cnossen	71	
28	Jaap van Ginkel	75	
29	Ton Hardonk	81	
30	Joop Alssema	401	
Total			

== 9: Reformed Political Party ==
Number	Candidate	Votes	Result
1	Bas van der Vlies	135,567	Elected
2	Kees van der Staaij	8,060	Elected
3	Elbert Dijkgraaf	1,508	
4	Eppie Klein	1,508	
5	Arie Noordergraaf	344	
6	Diederik van Dijk	343	
7	A.G. Bregman	136	
8	A. Weggeman	219	
9	P.C. den Uil	226	
10	Hans Tanis	155	
11	Gerrit Holdijk	214	
12	George van Heukelom	187	
13	M. Bogerd	203	
14	J.D. Heijkamp	117	
15	Roelof Bisschop	165	
16	Adri van Heteren	254	
17	F.W. de Boef	58	
18	Dirk-Jan Budding	281	
19	L. Bolier	45	
20	C.S.L. Janse	34	
21	L.G.I. Barth	72	
22	W. Fieret	105	
23	A.P. de Jong	59	
24	Peter Schalk	57	
25	A. Beens	222	
26	Bert Scholten	240	
27	J. Slingerland	59	
28	T. de Jong	225	
29	M.J. Kater	77	
30	Peter Zevenbergen	205	

== 10: Livable Netherlands ==
Candidate list for Livable Netherlands
Position	Candidate	Votes	Result
1	Haitske van de Linde	33,545	
2	Dick Jense	1,185	
3	Robbert Koop	811	
4	Presley Bergen	293	
5	Gosse Bootsma	296	
6	Bert Snel	245	
7	Tim Weijers	561	
8	George Reep	228	
9	Rick Manssen	117	
10	Han Bruin	121	
11	Caspar Pompe	84	
12	Piet Hermus	149	
13	Léance van Rees	139	
14	Eric Oosterom	161	
15	Leen IJdo	102	
16	Bas Pastoor	75	
17	Fred Roerig	135	
18	George Lubben	42	
19	Nick Raat	54	
20	John Jansen	48	
21	Jan van der Biezen	63	
22	Tarek Al-Chalabi	71	
23	Dimp Nelemans	369	
Total			

== 11: DeConservatieven.nl ==
Candidate list for DeConservatieven.nl
Position	Candidate	Votes	Result
1	Winny de Jong	1,868	
2	Michiel Smit	350	
3	Hans Mampaeij	43	
4	Marianne Kromme	24	
5	Joop van Heijgen	27	
6	Frits Tieleman	32	
7	Ger Kamphuis	34	
8	Johan Soijer	20	
9	Walter Moes	22	
10	Gerard Verhage	12	
11	André Wisselink	16	
12	Cor Eberhard	13	
13	Theo Jansen	60	
Total			

== 12: New Communist Party–NCPN ==
Candidate list for New Communist Party–NCPN
Position	Candidate	Votes	Result
1	Alejandro de Mello	3,087	
2	Corry Westgeest	312	
3	Wil van der Klift	116	
4	Job Pruijser	107	
5	Rinze Visser	161	
6	Marie-José Kressin-Funcken	43	
7	Hans Heres	127	
8	Mans Pruis	70	
9	Willem Gomes	63	
10	Annabelle Schouten	83	
11	Jan Ilsink	24	
12	Willy Berend	63	
13	Hein van Kasbergen	27	
14	Jan Cleton	31	
15	Zwanie Tielman	37	
16	Joop van Esch	19	
17	Jos Lensink	18	
18	Chuck Barkey	14	
19	René Asselman	25	
20	Éva Strausz	46	
21	Ron Verhoef	30	
22	Wilco Mulhuijzen	13	
23	Herwin Sap	29	
24	Rik Min	22	
25	Bert Jansen	39	
26	Rein Schinkel	20	
27	Gerrit Wooldrik	14	
28	Roy Houtkamp	21	
29	Willem van Kranenburg	30	
30	Albert Schwertman	163	
Total			

== 13: Durable Netherlands ==
Candidate list for Durable Netherlands
Position	Candidate	Votes	Result
1	Seyfi Özgüzel	4,276	
2	Ronald Zwiers	86	
3	Luc Sala	68	
4	Kensly Vrede	107	
5	Rob Hogendoorn	40	
6	Co Meijer	21	
7	Bülent Kiliç	310	
8	Haroon Raza	854	
9	Hüseyin Söner	104	
10	Mathi Nagan	69	
11	Laila Khamriche	37	
12	Asir Sari	680	
13	Kyra Kuitert	37	
14	Mustapha Eaisaouiyen	26	
15	Bedia Tanburoğlu	60	
16	Mustafa Önlü	142	
17	Samy El-Kadi	43	
18	Sjors Beenker	4	
19	Haydar Saglam	30	
20	Caroline Wagenaar	12	
21	Engin Son	24	
22	Yasemin Alakoç	66	
23	Hüsne Evsen	31	
24	Sevim Doğan	66	
25	Yvonne Lambers-Tekintürk	22	
26	Ton Besselink	14	
27	Manuel Kneepkens	42	
Total			

== 14: Party of the Future ==
Candidate list for Party of the Future
Position	Candidate	Votes	Result
1	Johan Vlemmix	8,706	
2	Theo Nabuurs	2,221	
3	Eric Hoogerheide	315	
4	Jop Nieuwenhuizen	334	
5	Arie Kuipers	168	
6	Fokke Dam	145	
7	Richard Jansen	333	
8	André Nijman	253	
9	Maurice van Woensel	65	
10	Martijn van Nellestijn	72	
11	Donald Hugens	56	
12	Joop Vlemmix	81	
13	Jeffrey Meijer	65	
14	Bart de Bruijn	82	
15	Rik Wamelink	30	
16	Babak Fakhamzadeh	65	
17	Sylvia Hartgers	93	
18	Duco Hoogland	53	
19	Michiel Eijsbouts	67	
20	Martijn van Boxtel	63	
21	Silas van Acker	24	
22	Joel Boreel	32	
23	Maarten Rouwenhorst	31	
24	Coenraad Abma	47	
25	Johan Kiewiet	43	
26	Rik van den Berg	29	
27	Mario van Blankers	32	
28	Maria Limburg-van Smeerdijk	38	
29	Arnold Veeman	46	
30	Astrid Wevers	256	
Total			

== 15: Party for the Animals ==
Candidate list for Party for the Animals
Position	Candidate	Votes	Result
1	Marianne Thieme	39,900	
2	Diana Saaman	1,099	
3	Bert Stoop	805	
4	Marjolein de Rooij	880	
5	Daphne Scheiberlich	695	
6	Selby van Holthe	205	
7	Noeme Mennes	176	
8	Hans Bok	822	
9	Elze Boshart	407	
10	Claudi Hulshof	271	
11	Lonneke Grobben	250	
12	Marcel Bertsch	126	
13	Hans Bosch	277	
14	Bobbie van Tuyll van Serooskerken	977	
15	Ton Dekker	329	
16	Loet Ellinger	535	
Total			

== 16: Ratelband List ==
Candidate list for Ratelband List
Position	Candidate	Votes	Result
1	Emile Ratelband	7,822	
2	Ingrid Hogenbirk	89	
3	Jan Jetten	57	
4	Joy van der Stel	57	
5	Fons Schirris	20	
6	Nel Overhand	35	
7	Paul Quekel	33	
8	Monica van der Hoff	24	
9	Ed Wichers	17	
10	Wiep Corbier	17	
11	José Eljon	28	
12	Emile Esajas	46	
13	Aloysia van Heeswijk	8	
14	Henk Jan Verboom	23	
15	Hetty van Scheltinga	28	
16	Wim Baardman	29	
17	Dennis Wiersma	31	
18	Marc van den Berg	28	
19	Adriaan van Gennep	19	
20	Mayke Paes	21	
21	Rob Brockhus	41	
22	Joop Vontsteen	21	
23	Marc Roos	12	
24	Marja Vleeskens	9	
25	Hans Mauritz	22	
26	Arnold van der Voort	31	
27	Jan van Aert	32	
28	Minou Ratelband	445	
Total			

== 17: Progressive Integration Party ==
Candidate list for Progressive Integration Party
Position	Candidate	Votes	Result
1	Ranesh Dhalganjansing	1,185	
2	Radjan Dhalganjansing	107	
3	Sharda Rambhadjan	70	
4	Merhi Ghamrawi	21	
5	Max Sordam	96	
6	Adde Sufi	66	
7	Anita Nandpersad	78	
Total			

== 18: Alliance for Renewal and Democracy ==
Candidate list for Alliance for Renewal and Democracy
Position	Candidate	Votes	Result
1	Y. van der Krieke	475	
2	F. Schreiber	60	
3	C.A. Stephan	36	
4	C.E.M. Rasch	29	
5	J.F. Besseling	35	
6	M.H.W. Campert	30	
7-12	Regional candidates		
Total			

=== Regional candidates ===
Regional candidates for Alliance for Renewal and Democracy
Candidate	Votes	Result	Position per electoral district		
Candidate	Votes	Result	Other	Leeuwarden	Leiden
R.T. Abma	12		7	7	
E.J. Hendrich	33		9	9	7
J.S.A. Kok	72		10	10	8
C.H. Koster	18		8	8	
I.H. Renkema	143			12	10
M.A. Singelenberg	47		11	11	9

== 20: Veldhoen List ==
Candidate list for Veldhoen List
Position	Candidate	Votes	Result
1	J. Veldhoen	296	
Total			

== Source ==
- Kiesraad (27 January 2003). "Proces-verbaal zitting Kiesraad uitslag Tweede Kamerverkiezing 2003" (PDF) (in Dutch).
