= 2003 Dutch general election =

- 22 January 2003
- All 150 seats in the House of Representatives; 76 seats needed for a majority
- Turnout: 80.04% (▲0.98pp)
Party	Leader	Vote %	Seats	+/–
CDA	Jan Peter Balkenende	28.62	44	+1
PvdA	Wouter Bos	27.26	42	+19
VVD	Gerrit Zalm	17.91	28	+4
SP	Jan Marijnissen	6.32	9	0
LPF	Mat Herben	5.70	8	−18
GL	Femke Halsema	5.14	8	−2
D66	Thom de Graaf	4.07	6	−1
CU	André Rouvoet	2.12	3	−1
SGP	Bas van der Vlies	1.56	2	0
This lists parties that won seats. See the complete results below.
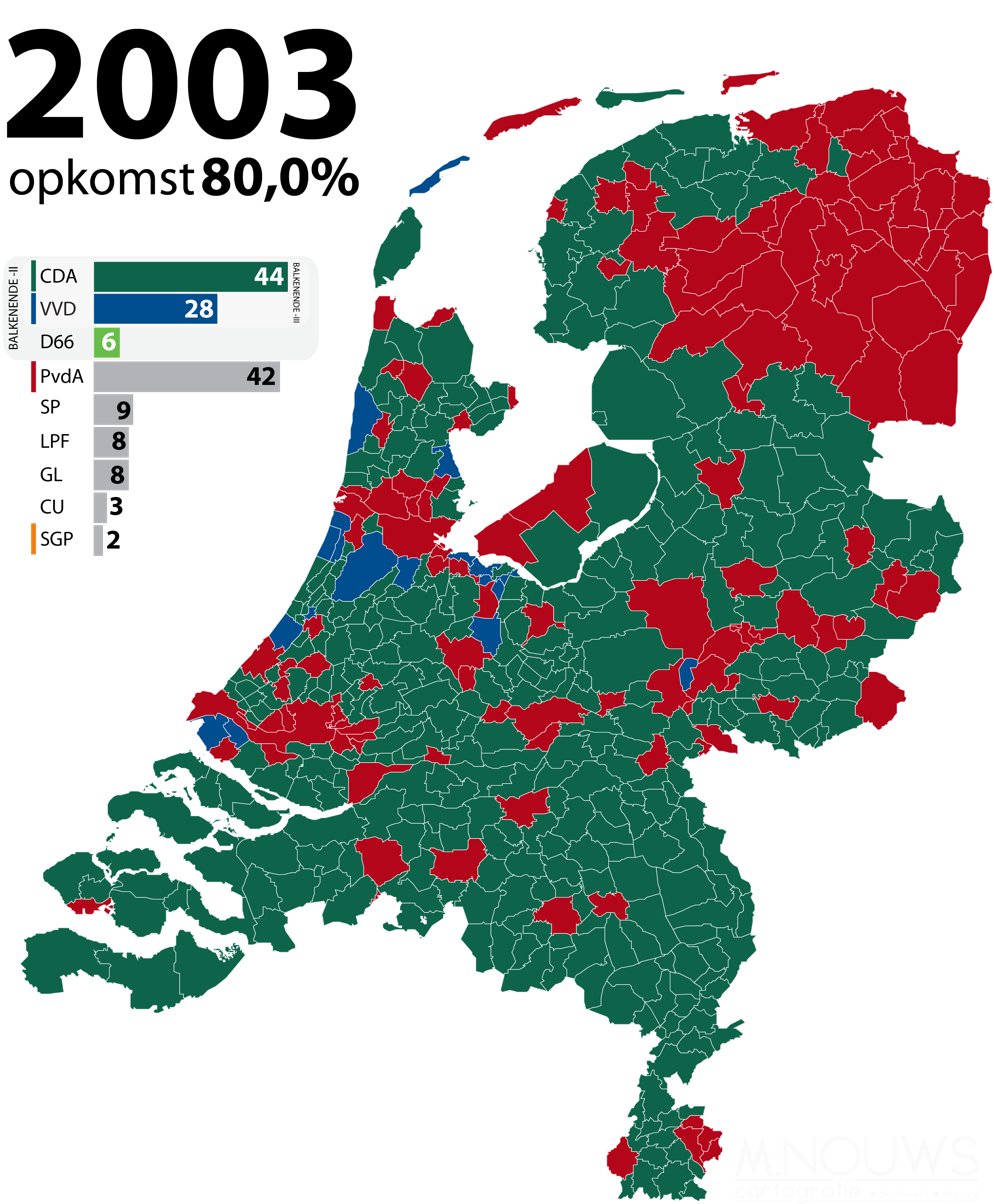
Most voted-for party by municipality
Cabinet before	Cabinet after
First Balkenende cabinet CDA–LPF–VVD	Second Balkenende cabinet CDA–VVD–D66

General elections were held in the Netherlands on 22 January 2003.

In the 2002 general election the Labour Party (PvdA) ran a campaign to transfer the premiership from Wim Kok to Ad Melkert, but its elitist tone alienated voters; Labour lost 22 seats and Melkert resigned. Hans Dijkstal's People's Party for Freedom and Democracy (VVD) pursued consensus messaging shaped by focus groups, declined to name a prime-ministerial candidate and was likewise punished at the polls, losing 14 seats; Dijkstal stepped down and Gerrit Zalm succeeded him. The Christian Democratic Appeal (CDA) surged, gaining 14 seats, and formed the First Balkenende cabinet coalition on 22 July 2002 with the Pim Fortuyn List (LPF) and a reluctant VVD. The LPF soon imploded: rival boards, leadership struggles, and scandals split the movement, while LPF ministers Eduard Bomhoff and Herman Heinsbroek feuded openly. By October their conflict paralysed cabinet meetings; Balkenende demanded unity, received none, and on 16 October offered his cabinet's resignation. Elections were set for 22 January 2003, portfolios passed to CDA–VVD caretakers, and the PvdA and VVD re-invented their campaign styles in response to failures from 2002.

Following the fall of the cabinet, the CDA and VVD aimed to win a majority of seats between them without the LPF. Early polls suggested this was possible, but their numbers fell below a majority by the end of November. The CDA won municipal elections held in newly merged areas in November, which were seen as a tentative bellwether. The PvdA, under Wouter Bos, gained momentum after a strong debate performance on 3 January, eventually naming mayor Job Cohen as its prime ministerial candidate. Bos's debate performance helped reframe the campaign as a CDA–PvdA contest. Meanwhile, the LPF, led by Mat Herben, struggled without Pim Fortuyn's appeal and due to the absorption of LPF political positions by mainstream parties. Democrats 66 (D66), excluded from major debates, bought mid-debate advertisements but saw no polling improvement. The Party for the Animals (PvdD) ran a low-budget campaign focused on South Holland while Livable Netherlands (LN) gained negligible media attention. The final pre-election poll showed PvdA slightly ahead of the CDA.

The CDA retained first place with 44 seats, the PvdA rebounded to 42, the VVD rose to 28, while the SP secured 9 and the LPF fell to 8. LN lost both its seats and placed behind the PvdD, which narrowly missed entering parliament. The PvdA and CDA both gained pluralities in 6 provinces. Labour's advance chiefly reflected defections from the CDA and GroenLinks. Since provincial elections took place on 11 March, parties either continued campaigning after election day without interruption or resumed their campaigns in a matter of weeks. The coalition talks initially centred on a CDA–PvdA administration but collapsed on 12 April; subsequent negotiations produced the centre-right Second Balkenende cabinet of CDA, VVD and D66, sworn in on 27 May 2003.

== Background ==
=== The previous election and its lessons (May 2002) ===
For the 2002 Dutch general election, the Labour Party (PvdA) conducted a campaign strongly influenced by sociological and communication research. The campaign was shaped by professional political market researchers, aiming for a "scientific" approach to message crafting. The party leadership—particularly the trio of Prime Minister Wim Kok, campaign manager Dick Benschop, and party leader Ad Melkert—exercised tight control over the process. Their chief concern was ensuring a smooth transition of power from Kok to Melkert. Other prominent figures within the party, including Jeltje van Nieuwenhoven, Klaas de Vries, and Ruud Koole, reportedly felt marginalized. Despite meticulous planning, the campaign lacked "vitality" and failed to connect with voters. The party was widely seen as elitist and managerial, rather than a party of its members and voters.

The VVD's campaign ahead of the 2002 election bore the strong imprint of its then-leader Hans Dijkstal. His strategy emphasized consensus and moderation, presenting the VVD as a unifying party amid political fragmentation. His campaign was also later noted for its use of focus groups. Dijkstal consciously avoided polarizing rhetoric and positioned himself as a mild-mannered, non-antagonistic figure. He was so committed to presenting himself as part of a collective team that he refused to declare himself the party's candidate for prime minister, suggesting instead that figures like Gerrit Zalm might also be suitable. Dijkstal spent considerable time building support for his approach within the party's broader leadership structure. This strategy, however, proved poorly suited to the political climate of 2002. The lack of a sharp ideological stance or charismatic central figure weakened the VVD's appeal. When the campaign faltered, Dijkstal was quickly abandoned by those who had initially backed his approach.

Ballots were cast on 15 May; the purple coalition parties—Labour, VVD, and D66—all lost heavily. Labour endured a record 22-seat loss under Melkert, who resigned that night. The CDA improved its vote share in every province, securing pluralities in all except Groningen. Negotiations produced a CDA–LPF–VVD accord prioritising security, healthcare, and tighter immigration; the first Balkenende cabinet assumed office on 22 July. Following the VVD's electoral defeat, Hans Dijkstal stepped down as party leader, and on 16 May the new parliamentary group unanimously elected former finance minister Gerrit Zalm as its chair. Zalm went on to distance himself from the purple coalition for making too many half-hearted compromises. On 16 August, Dijkstal announced his departure from parliament effective 1 September, citing internal party shifts and post-election turmoil as obstacles to his effectiveness.

The failure of the PvdA's 2002 campaign triggered both a personnel and strategic overhaul in preparation for the 2003 election. One major change was the sidelining of professional campaign consultants and their data-driven methodologies. Under new campaign leader and party chairman Ruud Koole, the PvdA abandoned the previous over-reliance on market research. Instead, it embraced a more direct, emotionally resonant form of politics intended to reconnect with the party base. Koole's goal was to reestablish Labour as a genuinely representative and socially engaged party. The process had already begun before the fall of the Balkenende cabinet, with internal reports like those of De Boer and Anderson criticizing the party's drift toward managerialism and political detachment. In contrast to Melkert's elitist image, new party leader Wouter Bos was positioned as a humble figure. The 2003 campaign emphasized teamwork, renewal, and a more open, democratic style of leadership. Bos was prominently featured, but always alongside others, symbolizing a break with the past.

The VVD also shifted course following its disappointing result in the 2002 election. Responsibility for the new campaign was placed in the hands of a tight inner circle around Gerrit Zalm, including campaign leader Hans van Baalen, press officer Kees Berghuis, and speechwriter Frits Huffnagel. This team operated largely independently from the broader party apparatus. The 2003 campaign emphasized clarity and ambition, in stark contrast to the conciliatory tone of Dijkstal's 2002 effort. Zalm did not shy away from staking out bold policy positions, often more assertive than those of his parliamentary colleagues. Importantly, he explicitly declared himself a candidate for the premiership, ending the ambiguity that had characterized Dijkstal's positioning. Van Baalen stressed the return to "political common sense," rejecting the need for focus groups. NRC Handelsblad (10 January 2003) noted: "PvdA and the VVD have each drawn lessons from last year's election defeat, but not the same lessons"; the former had become more humble, the latter more decisive.

=== First Balkenende cabinet (May–October 2002) ===
==== Cabinet formation (May–July 2002) ====
Queen Beatrix appointed the CDA jurist Piet Hein Donner as informateur on 17 May 2002, directing him to assemble a cabinet that could rely on constructive parliamentary cooperation. Donner soon centred talks on a coalition of CDA and LPF, preferably with the VVD; the left‑wing parties and the small Christian formations opted for opposition. The VVD, shaken by its electoral losses, initially favoured an external‑support model and proposed that CDA and LPF govern as a minority. Balkenende and LPF leader Mat Herben rejected that formula, and on 23 May the VVD caucus agreed—grudgingly—to full participation, provided that substantial liberal planks be enacted. Negotiations opened the same day. Consensus formed quickly on €10 billion in fiscal retrenchment and on a tougher asylum regime. The LPF secured agreement on elected mayors, but its demands for a directly elected prime minister, a corrective referendum, and the suspension of the Betuweroute freight line were blocked by its partners.

In late June, Donner consolidated the results into the Strategic Accord Working on Trust: Getting Down to Business. The draft, approved by the negotiators on 28 June and by their caucuses on 3 July, reflected campaign priorities: public security, healthcare, education and immigrant integration preceded socio‑economic and external affairs. Policy highlights included stricter criminal sentencing, demand‑driven medical care, limits on school mergers, mandatory civic‑integration courses, and tighter family‑reunification rules. Each party gained a flagship concession: a life‑course savings scheme for the CDA, abolition of the property tax (Onroerendezaakbelasting) for the VVD, and removal of the kwartje van Kok (a 25-cent excise tax on petrol) for the LPF. Institutional reform was confined to elected mayors; referendums disappeared, and Fortuyn's broader anti‑bureaucratic and Eurosceptic themes were largely absent. Although the opposition denounced the accord in a 4 July debate—citing scant renewal, WAO cutbacks, and neglect of hospital wait lists—the queen that afternoon named Balkenende formateur, tasking him chiefly with divvying portfolios.

Portfolio bargaining proved more fractious than policy drafting. Under pressure from its restless caucus, the LPF repeatedly sent Herben back to demand a Justice‑based Ministry of Immigration and a stronger integration remit. On 10 July the parties struck a final bargain: six CDA ministers, four each for LPF and VVD, and fourteen junior posts divided five‑five‑four. Minor concessions on the integration brief quelled remaining dissent, and on 11 July all factions ratified the list. Balkenende interviewed candidates through the following week; on 22 July the queen swore in the first Balkenende cabinet. Balkenende became prime minister and minister of general affairs, with Johan Remkes (VVD) and Eduard Bomhoff (LPF) as deputy prime ministers at Interior and Health. Other key posts went to Piet Hein Donner (CDA, Justice), Jaap de Hoop Scheffer (CDA, Foreign Affairs), Hans Hoogervorst (VVD, Finance), Herman Heinsbroek (LPF, Economic Affairs), Cees Veerman (CDA, Agriculture), and Hilbrand Nawijn (LPF, immigration).

Only one day later, LPF State Secretary for Social Affairs and Work Opportunity Philomena Bijlhout resigned after it was reported that she had failed to disclose her past membership in a Surinamese militia group.

==== LPF internal conflicts (May–October 2002) ====
Two days after the election, MP Leon Geurts was rejected from the LPF's parliamentary caucus after it was found he had falsified parts of his CV, including making an unverified claim that he was a doctorandus in economics from Erasmus University Rotterdam. He subsequently stepped down from the House and retired from politics citing media pressure and threats made to his LPF colleagues.

After the election, the LPF gradually descended into administrative chaos: correspondence went unanswered, the membership register was incomplete, and treasurer Herman Dost blocked any audit of party accounts. To force a reset, MPs installed an eight‑member interim board on 5 June, but this was decried as an imposed regime with no involvement from grassroots supporters. Regional coordinators feared marginalisation, and founding board members Dost and Peter Langendam turned against the new statutes that limited rank‑and‑file voting rights. On 27 June they revoked the interim board's mandate, prompting MPs to threaten secession. After mediation by major donors, a compromise kept Langendam and Dostuntil a July assembly, yet they resigned under pressure on 2 and 3 July respectively and ceded authority to businessman Ed Maas and lawyer Cees van Leeuwen.Although an extraordinary gathering of 800 members endorsed Maas's reorganisation mandate, divisions persisted; online entrepreneur Ruud Both, Dost's ally, initially denounced the procedure and vowed a rival meeting, but still ended up taking a position under Maas.

The parliamentary group soon fractured over strategy and leadership. Polls showing an eleven‑seat slump intensified dissatisfaction with Mat Herben's negotiation style and perceived leniency toward coalition partners. Exhausted, Herben announced his departure on 8 August, effective 1 September; on 20 August the caucus elevated Harry Wijnschenk, a former VVD municipal councillor and motor‑magazine seller, who immediately apologised for the party's turmoil and created a nine‑member executive team. His tenure began in scandal: television revealed MP Willem van der Velden's adviser formerly had ties to the far-right centre party and CP86, (20 August) and Algemeen Dagblad alleged that MP Cor Eberhard had concealed a criminal past (24 August); both were temporarily suspended. Wijnschenk, under stress, first denied then admitted knowing the adviser and drafted a loyalty pledge renouncing extremism. Eberhard threatened legal action, the newspaper retracted its claim (31 August), and he returned, deepening mutual distrust. On 26 September, MP Winny de Jong threatened to defect from the party unless Winschenk stepped down, accusing him of having purchased his seat.

By early October the party verged on open schism. A 1 October meeting expelled De Jong and Eberhard after ten hours of discussion; they remained in the house as Groep De Jong. This provoked provincial chairs to condemn Wijnschenk and Hoogendijk and to demand their removal. On 30 September, Wijnschenk unilaterally urged Economics Minister Herman Heinsbroek to assume political leadership of the LPF, shocking both the interim board and Deputy Prime Minister Eduard Bomhoff. Heinsbroek expressed conditional interest if Bomhoff relinquished his post. However, Bornhoff refused, and Maas opposed the gambit. On 2 October, Wijnshenk accused Maas of using his position to reward "real estate friends" with political power. A crisis conference on 3 October produced a fragile truce: Wijnschenk retracted accusations against Maas, and unity was proclaimed for the cameras. Two days later, however, all twelve provincial chairs withdrew confidence in Wijnschenk and called for reconciliation with the expelled MPs; interim chair Maas voiced willingness to see dissidents form a separate faction. Wijnschenk refused to step down, scheduling a confidence vote for 16 October—delayed by Prince Claus's death (6 October).

==== Cabinet disintegration (October 2002) ====
Mounting strife within the LPF placed the first Balkenende cabinet under acute strain in October 2002. Two rival camps crystallised: Bomhoff aligned with interim party chair Maas, whereas Heinsbroek backed parliamentary leader Wijnschenk. On 4 October Balkenende still dismissed questions about LPF discord. During an assembly on 5 October, Heinsbroek was the only minister to publicly support Weinschenk, while Bomhoff was publicly neutral. Heinsbroek denounced Bomhoff's neutral speech as a lulverhaal (bullshit), and the pair clashed again when Bomhoff urged revisions to Central Planning Bureau models, to which Heinsbroek objected. Viewing their feud as a threat to government viability, Balkenende warned at the 11 October cabinet meeting that the squabbling must cease; VVD leader Zalm echoed the concern on 13 October, saying a cabinet could not function with two ministers "who can't stand the sight of each other."

On 13 October LPF ministers convened and, by majority, demanded Bomhoff's resignation; ministers Khee Liang Phoa and Cees van Leeuwen dissented. After Prince Claus's funeral on 15 October, LPF ministers withdrew confidence in both Bomhoff and Heinsbroek, yet they refused to step aside, each insisting the parliamentary caucus should decide. Balkenende suspended that evening's cabinet session, warning he would govern only if the LPF united behind its leader and both ministers resigned voluntarily. The next morning, before talks resumed, CDA and VVD leaders Maxime Verhagen and Zalm declared their trust in the coalition exhausted. Bomhoff and Heinsbroek agreed to quit, but the decision was moot: Balkenende informed Parliament that his cabinet had lost its basis and tendered its resignation to the Queen. Bomhoff's later memoir, Blinde Ambitie (published 19 December 2002), quoting confidential cabinet deliberations, prompted an inquiry into possible breach of official secrecy.

Immediately after the collapse, Balkenende and Verhagen signalled readiness to continue with the VVD but not the LPF, noting polls that hinted at a joint majority of 77 to 79 seats. LPF ministers petitioned Queen Beatrix on 21 October for a "glueing attempt", even offering to cede a portfolio, yet CDA and VVD dismissed the overture as "a passed station." Following consultations with her constitutional advisers and parliamentary leaders—none but the LPF favoured salvaging the coalition—the Queen accepted the resignation. Balkende set 22 January 2003 for new elections, allowing time for new parties to register by 28 October. Balkenende explained the date as the earliest practicable moment satisfying the House's wish for rapid elections. In the intervening caretaker period the portfolios of the departed LPF ministers were reassigned to CDA and VVD colleagues—Aart Jan de Geus took Health and the deputy premiership from Bomhoff, while Hans Hoogervorst assumed Economic Affairs from Heinsbroek.

=== Developments within opposition parties ===
==== Labour Party (May–November 2002) ====
The Labour Party anticipated a setback yet was shocked by the loss of 22 seats on 15 May—its then-steepest decline ever (Note: In the 2017 election, Labour went on to suffer a greater decline of 29 seats) and worse than the CDA's record loss in 1994. Ad Melkert resigned on the night following the election under pressure from Koole and Kok. He remained in parliament until he later accepted an executive directorship at the World Bank, an appointment unsuccessfully opposed by LPF house representatives. In his valedictory remarks, Melkert warned against reflexive national self‑loathing and maintained that the 2002 platform remained a sound basis for opposition. On 16 May, the caucus elected Jeltje van Nieuwenhoven its chair, though she disclaimed party leadership.

Campaign strategist Jacques Monasch later criticized an excessive focus on macro‑economics at the expense of healthcare, security and immigration, and his chronicle De Strijd om de Macht (The Struggle for Power) depicted a divided team centred obsessively on Melkert. Political scientist Philip van Praag faulted the re‑use of the 1994 and 1998 playbooks, while campaign director Dick Benschop acknowledged vacillation between defending the coalition record and promising change. The executive created two panels. The De Boer committee on political direction, chaired by Meta de Boer, and the Andersson committee on organisation and culture. De Boer's report, De Kaasstolp aan Diggelen, charged the campaign with scripting "the wrong protagonist," condemned Koole and colleagues for clinging to bureaucratic style after the disastrous 6 March debate, and highlighted deeper identity erosion on multiculturalism, meritocracy, democracy and Europe. Andersson urged more tiers of memberships, primary‑style selections and structured dialogue through digital platforms and local meetings.

On 24 May, Koole proposed that members, not MPs, should elect the new parliamentary leader by referendum in the autumn; the Political Forum endorsed the idea on 1 June, and in July the executive scheduled a November ballot for the Lower‑House chair, the Senate lead and possibly provincial list‑leaders. Rules adopted on 2 September required an absolute majority and at least 15 percent turnout, failing which the caucus would regain the appointment right. Former state‑secretary Wouter Bos, encouraged by 120 000 preference votes in the May election, entered the race on 27 August, promising an open debate and clearer positions; ex‑minister Klaas de Vries joined on 29 September, urging closer ties with D66 and GroenLinks, while vice‑chair Adri Duivesteijn withdrew. Incumbent van Nieuwenhoven announced in October, and public hustings followed. Bos argued for curbing mortgage relief for higher earners; De Vries mocked VVD leader Zalm over the cabinet collapse. On 12 November Bos won decisively with 60 percent of the 32 000 ballots cast, interpreted as members' appetite for generational renewal.

==== GroenLinks (May–November 2002) ====
At the GroenLinks party council on 25 May 2002, Rosenmöller attributed the modest election result to the "bizarre political climate" rather than campaign flaws, though members criticized the party's proximity to the Labour party and Rosenmöller's excessive hostility to Fortuyn. Rosenmöller proposed an opposition pact with SP, D66, and Labour, which gained little traction. On 15 November, Rosenmöller announced he would step down as party leader, citing threats to his family since Fortuyn's murder. On 23 November 2002, Femke Halsema was elected as his successor by the party congress with 97.6% of the vote.

==== Socialist Party (May–November 2002) ====
In the 2002 election, the Socialist Party secured 9 seats in the House of Representatives, a gain of 4, making it the only left-leaning party to increase its share. SP leader Jan Marijnissen rejected proposals for a formal left-wing bloc against the emerging center-right coalition of CDA, LPF, and VVD, despite appeals from Rosenmöller and Labour MP Duivesteijn. Marijnissen noted past efforts to collaborate with labour, which Melkert had resisted. On 21 October, the SP board convened to prepare for new elections, presenting a near-identical candidate list and program, ratified on 23 November. Marijnissen would reprise his role as lead candidate.

==== Democrats 66 (May–November 2002) ====
On 16 May 2002, after the loss of 7 seats in the prior day's election, D66 party leader Thom de Graaf acknowledged responsibility and offered to step down, but was unanimously re-elected as parliamentary leader by his six fellow MPs. Both the national board and the party's youth wing reaffirmed their confidence in him. Former minister Roger van Boxtel declined his seat, citing the election result as a rejection of his integration policies, rendering him unfit for opposition. He was replaced by Boris van der Ham. In the leadership contest, 11 candidates emerged. At the 16 November party congress, De Graaf was decisively re-elected.

==== Christian Union (May–November 2002) ====
The disappointing election result of 2002 caused significant unrest within the Christian Union, sparking internal criticism over the party's vague Christian profile and perceived eagerness for coalition participation. Party leader Kars Veling was seen as insufficiently charismatic and was criticized for both his campaign performance and certain remarks, such as downplaying Sunday observance. Calls for renewal grew, and a party evaluation concluded that the campaign prioritized potential cabinet alliances over clarity of message, while internal democracy had been lacking. Although Veling initially remained supported, his subsequent health issues and mounting pressure led him to resign on 29 October. On 2 November, André Rouvoet was selected as the lead candidate for the 2003 election.

==== Reformed Political Party (Summer–December 2002) ====
In the summer of 2002, the Clara Wichmann Institute (CWI) sought a Calvinist woman to challenge the Reformed Political Party (SGP)'s refusal to grant women full membership, with promises of legal funds. A student member of the SGP youth wing responded but withdrew after a tense October meeting with party leaders, who allegedly (Note: According to the CWI. The SGP denied that the student was threatened with hell, but acknowledged such an implication may have been made.) told her that she would go to hell if she persisted. A compromise proposal allowing women full membership with male permission was rejected. In December, the SGP submitted its candidate list and an updated program for the 2003 elections. The candidate list was unchanged from 2002; Bas van der Vlies would reprise his role as lead candidate.

==== Livable Netherlands (May–November 2002) ====
The 2002 election results proved disappointing for Livable Netherlands, which had publicly set a goal of obtaining at least ten parliamentary seats. Founders Jan Nagel, Willem van Kooten, Broos Schnetz, and Henk Westbroek had already pledged to resign if this threshold was not reached; thus, their resignations immediately followed the party securing only two seats. Nagel was succeeded as party chair by Jan Jetten. Potential cooperation with the LPF was opposed by party leader Fred Teeven. On 13 November, four leading party members resigned due to Jetten's leadership style, which was criticized as mismanaged, autocratic and clientelist. On 22 November, Jetten controversially proposed to replace Teeven as party leader with media personality Emile Ratelband. On 8 December, the party board elected Haitske van der Linde, who defeated Ratelband with a vote margin of 75 against 73.

=== New parties ===
==== Ratelband List (December 2002) ====
In December 2002, Emile Ratelband decided to set up his own Ratelband List after being rejected as lijsttrekker for Livable Netherlands; his daughter Minou had also had a prominent place in the list. Ratelband had only one day to compile a list of candidates and collect the required 570 signatures (declarations of support) spread across the nineteen electoral districts, as these had to be submitted to the Electoral Council by December 10. The political programme of the Ratelband List was essentially in the spirit of Pim Fortuyn. The Ratelband List took part in the elections for the Tweede Kamer on 22 January 2003. Ratelband asserted that he would move to Australia or the Fiji Islands if the list failed to win a single seat.

==== Groep de Jong / DeConservatieven.nl (October 2002) ====
On 1 October, the LPF expelled Winny de Jong and Cor Eberhard; (Note: For more detail, see section #LPF internal conflicts (May–October 2002)) they remained in the house as Groep De Jong. Later that month, De Jong registered the party De Conservatieven.nl with the Electoral Council. She aimed to advocate for people "with an established status in society" and to "correct the excessive policies" in the areas of integration, public safety, and healthcare. European policy would also be a key focus. Initially, it was not yet known whether Eberhard would join her. but they did end up founding the party together.

During the election, DeConservatieven.nl encountered some controversy when it was discovered the second candidate on the list Michiel Smit had been associated with internet white power groups including the site Stormfront. The party won around 0.3% of the vote and did not return any MPs to parliament. It de-registered itself shortly after.

==== Party for the Animals (October 2002) ====
The First Balkenende cabinet was more hostile to animal welfare than the preceding Second Kok cabinet: it scrapped plans to ban mink farming, relaxed restrictions on hunting, and postponed regulations on factory farming. Cabinet party LPF pushed for these changes; Lieke Keller, director of the anti-fur farming organisation Bont voor Dieren (Bont for animals), interpreted these acts as trying to "get even" with activists following the assassination of Pim Fortuyn by environmental and animal rights activist Volkert van der Graaf. Despite their past support for animal welfare, GroenLinks and the Socialist Party did not vocally oppose the cabinet's animal policy. The cabinet was described as having rolled back 20 years of animal welfare progress. When a snap election were announced on 21 October 2002, Keller spoke with her colleague Marianne Thieme and suggested starting a party dedicated to animal rights. Thieme responded that she didn't believe in single-issue parties, but changed her mind on 24 October during a protest against seal hunting: "It's about an entire group of inhabitants being ignored, that's not a single issue". Thus, the Party for the Animals was founded and registered on 28 October 2002. The media did not pay attention to this, as it was focused on the LPF's internal struggles.

==== Progressive Integration Party (October–November 2002) ====
The Progressive Integration Party (Vooruitstrevende Integratie Partij) was founded on 28 October 2002. Its stated goal was to "further the integration of migrants in the Netherlands without loss of their identity". On 6 November, the electoral council declined the party's attempted registration due to potential acronym-related confusion with the Free Indian Party (Vrije Indische Partij; VIP). The ruling was overturned on 22 November as confusion was deemed unlikely. Ranesh Dhalganjansing was the party's lead candidate. The 2003 general election would be one of two election cycles in which this party participated, the other being the 2006 Dutch municipal elections. It never exceeded 0.1% of the vote.

==== Alliance for Renewal and Democracy (October 2002–January 2003) ====
In October 2002, IJsbrand van der Krieke, director of the LPF's North Holland branch, left the LPF due to the party's lack of internal democracy and founded the Alliance for Renewal and Democracy (Alliantie voor Vernieuwing en Democratie; AVD). Krieke was the party's lead candidate. It had around 20 members around New Year's Day 2003. The 2003 general election would be this party's only election cycle.

==== List Veldhoen (2002) ====
List Veldhoen was established in 2002. Jan Veldhoen was its sole candidate, participating in four electoral districts. The party platform established its central aim as the promotion of the well-being of all citizens, regardless of origin. It further emphasized improving public safety, healthcare, education, and integration, while reducing bureaucracy and restoring trust in government. The party advocated better care for vulnerable groups—such as addicts, the homeless, and the elderly—stricter law enforcement, and a clearer moral code in public life. It also called for tighter immigration controls, mandatory assessments for newcomers, and the deportation of undocumented individuals, linking residency rights to employment and integration outcomes. The 2003 general election would be its only election cycle.

=== Returning extra-parliamentary parties ===
The following extra-parliamentary parties returned to contest the 2003 Dutch general election:

Party	Lead candidate	Previous general election result	
Durable Netherlands	Seyfi Özgüzel	2002 Dutch general election	9,058 votes (0.10%)
Party of the Future	Johan Vlemmix	2002 Dutch general election	6,393 votes (0.07%)
New Communist Party–NCPN	Alejandro de Mello	1998 Dutch general election	5,620 votes (0.07%)

== Campaign ==
=== CDA and VVD aim for joint majority (16 October–2 December 2002) ===
With their Strategic Accord still formally intact, the CDA and VVD at first campaigned as continuity partners, hoping to secure a direct majority (76 seats or more) without the LPF. Early polling conducted by NIPO on 17 October appeared to validate this strategy: the poll projected 49 seats for the CDA and 31 for the VVD; together, this constituted 80 seats, enough for a parliamentary majority. The LPF, by contrast, suffered a dramatic decline, having fallen to just 4 seats. Over the following weeks, the CDA maintained its strong lead, while the VVD experienced minor fluctuations, and a coalition between the two remained arithmetically viable as late as 21 November.

By 28 November, the political dynamics had notably shifted. The Socialist Party under Jan Marijnissen gained substantial momentum, drawing support from both left- and right-leaning electorates and rising to 21 projected seats. Meanwhile, public confidence in Zalm's leadership waned, contributing to a decline in VVD support to 25 seats, thereby reducing the CDA–VVD bloc to 73 seats—below the majority threshold. The PvdA advanced to 28 seats, making a CDA–PvdA coalition a numerically plausible alternative at 76. Inside the VVD, elder statesman Hans Wiegel openly criticised Zalm's handling of the cabinet crash and praised Marijnissen's grassroots style; Vice-Premier Johan Remkes dismissed the LPF as unstable, and Finance Minister Hans Hoogervorst suggested opposition if no majority emerged—remarks Zalm downplayed while proposing D66 or the Christian Union as fallback partners. At separate congresses (held on 30 November and 2 December respectively), Balkenende kept the LPF formally eligible but signalled caution, whereas Zalm claimed the VVD's polling dip was temporary and put himself forth as a candidate for prime minister.

Labour, meanwhile, capitalized on the fluid political environment with a reinvigorated campaign. Following the cabinet's collapse, the party shifted its internal leadership consultation into a formal lijsttrekker election, resulting in the selection of Wouter Bos. Under campaign director Rineke Klijnsma and chairman Ruud Koole, the party conducted a cost-effective, grassroots-focused campaign emphasizing accessibility and community engagement. The central message—"a party by and for the people"—was visually reinforced through campaign materials featuring Bos among a diverse group of citizens. Public events, particularly the widely attended "Arena meetings," contributed to a surge in media visibility and popular support. By 30 November, Zalm ruled out a cabinet with Labour while Balkenende stated his openness.

=== Municipal reorganization elections (6–20 November 2002) ===
Results of the municipal reorganization elections by municipality.
- CDA won plurality
- SP won plurality
- CDA won plurality, local parties won plurality if grouped together

Municipal reorganization elections were held in the Netherlands in November 2002. They were controversially seen as a bellwether for the 2003 Dutch general election.

Over the course of April to June 2002, the Dutch government approved six new municipal mergers, which would take effect on 1 January 2003. This led to new elections in November 2002 across six reorganized municipalities: Oss (largest), Terneuzen, Zwijndrecht, Echt-Susteren, Hulst and Sluis (smallest). Half of these prospective municipalities were located in Zeeland; the others were located in Limburg (Echt-Susteren), South Holland (Zwijndrecht) and North Brabant (Oss). In the municipal elections of 1998, the Christian Democratic Appeal (CDA) won pluralities in 3 of these areas, while trailing the Socialist Party (SP) in Oss, the Labour Party (PvdA) in Zwijndrecht, and a local party in Sluis. Furthermore, if local parties are treated as a bloc, they outpolled the CDA in Echt-Susteren and Hulst, where they won outright majorities. Across these areas, the CDA was the strongest national contender, garnering 28'234 votes (22.2%). The CDA was followed by the Labour Party (PvdA), which received 15.4% of the vote.

In October 2002, internal strife within the Pim Fortuyn List (LPF) led to the collapse of the first Balkenende cabinet, triggering a snap election in January 2003. As a result, the municipal reorganization elections held the following month were treated as a tentative indicator of national trends, despite covering only newly merged municipalities. Analysts debated their relevance, with some arguing the elections reflected broader sentiment while others highlighted the distortions introduced by local grievances and the unique context of annexations. The SP was projected to strengthen its position in Oss, while the CDA was expected to perform well. Far-right activity surfaced in Zwijndrecht and Oss, though ultimately failed to gain traction. National party leaders, including the CDA's Jan Peter Balkenende, PvdA’s Wouter Bos, VVD's Gerrit Zalm, SP's Jan Marijnissen, and GroenLinks’ Paul Rosenmöller actively campaigned in the affected areas. On 6 November, Echt-Susteren became the election cycle's first municipality to vote; the rest followed on the 20th.

The CDA emerged as the overall winner, collecting 28,554 votes (23.7%) and leading in five of six new municipalities, with its strongest performance in Zwijndrecht. The SP dominated in Oss with 38.4% but did not achieve an outright majority. The PvdA came second overall with 15,963 votes (13.2%) but suffered a notable decline, particularly in Zwijndrecht where it lost its plurality. Local parties, although fragmented, performed well collectively, especially in Echt-Susteren and Hulst, where they collectively exceeded 50% of the vote. The far-right New National Party contested only Zwijndrecht and failed to win a seat. Analysts cautioned against drawing national conclusions from partisan results, citing local dynamics and the distorting effects of recent mergers, though the high turnout was attributed to the cabinet collapse. In Oss, 17-year-old Lilian Marijnissen—future leader of the SP—won a seat via preference votes, joining the municipal council in September 2003 after reaching the age of eligibility.

=== Bos—Zalm Buitenhof debate (8 December 2002) ===
The campaign gained momentum in December; the first televised debate between Bos and Zalm took place on 8 December on Buitenhof. Both candidates quickly concluded that a coalition between their parties would be unwise, given stark policy disagreements—particularly on fiscal matters. Bos advocated increased public spending to stimulate the faltering economy, arguing that a moderate rise in the deficit would prevent further unemployment and hardship. Zalm countered that such policies would dangerously inflate the budget deficit, eventually forcing severe austerity. He accused the PvdA of irresponsible promises, especially their proposal to increase spending by 1.5 billion euros without clear funding, warning of future consequences like frozen benefits.

The debate also revealed deep divisions on taxation, healthcare, and immigration. Bos opposed the VVD's plan to abolish property taxes, arguing it mainly benefits the wealthy and undermines local support for the poor. He also rejected a flat-rate health insurance premium, favoring income-based contributions. Zalm criticized this as covert income redistribution, insisting taxes—not insurance—should handle equity. He further opposed the PvdA's plan to reduce mortgage interest deductions for high earners, warning it targeted a substantial segment of homeowners. On immigration, Zalm supported stricter entry requirements and mandatory language acquisition abroad, while Bos expressed reservations. Following the debate, Zalm reflected positively on the exchange on his blog, particularly proud of his stance on public safety and immigration, and welcomed the start of a content-driven campaign season, though he remarked that it felt weird to debate his former secretary.

The 8 December debate is mentioned in the DNPP (Documentatiecentrum Nederlandse Politieke Partijen; Documentation centre Dutch political parties)'s chronicle of the 2003 election campaign, where it is described as the first debate between Zalm and Bos. However, Van Holsteyn et al. (2004)'s chronicle of the 2003 election downplays the 8 December debate, referring to the 3 January 2003 debate—which included 4 parties (PvdA, CDA, SP, and VVD)—as the "first important televised confrontation between the party leaders". Some contemporary media reports went further, with Trouw and Leidsch Dagblad referring to the 3 January debate as the "eerste lijstrekkerdebat" (first lead candidate debate), despite the PvdA and VVD leaders having already sparred previously.

=== "Vague and erratic" (14 December 2002) ===
In an interview with de Volkskrant on 14 December, Bos argued that the Dutch constitution should be amended to end the right of faith-based schools to reject students based on religion, advocating a general obligation for all schools to accept children from their local communities regardless of religious background. He asserted this was necessary to ensure schools reflect the social makeup of their neighbourhoods. Bos criticised previous PvdA leadership, including Wim Kok and Ad Melkert, for pushing the party into the "Purple" coalition without broad support from its base. On integration, he supported encouraging Dutch as the spoken language in mosques and emphasized population mixing across schools to prevent social fragmentation. Bos also reiterated his preference for persuasion over compulsion but stressed that progress had to be made.

Regarding coalition prospects, Bos had already signalled his willingness to collaborate with the CDA, though the PvdA and CDA did not jointly poll at a majority at the time. He expressed a lack of enthusiasm for Democrats 66 (D66), calling the party's economic policies "warrig en zwalkend" (vague and erratic). Although he did not explicitly rule out cooperation with D66, he stated he preferred alliances with GroenLinks, SP, or CU. He added: "I'm not choosing between the three. If they perform strongly, the SP must be involved in coalition talks. I'm curious to see on which issues Marijnissen is willing to compromise. The differences between the PvdA and GroenLinks are minimal."

In response, D66 leader Thom de Graaf voiced disappointment, accusing Bos of initiating a historical rupture between the PvdA and D66. De Graaf denied D66 was inconsistent and pointed to policy differences, such as on welfare reform and healthcare financing, to explain the divergence between the parties. He expressed surprise that the PvdA seemed more inclined to align with parties like SP and ChristenUnie than with D66, its former coalition partner. While affirming that a CDA–VVD–D66 coalition was not his preference, De Graaf refused to rule it out entirely, citing political realities and emphasizing the need to secure programmatic influence. He reiterated D66's priorities: increased investment in education, environmental protection, and democratic reform. He rejected the notion that Bos's comments had personally offended him but insisted that D66 remained coherent and principled in contrast to the PvdA's shifting alliances. De Graaf concluded by affirming D66's relevance, even amid poor polling, emphasizing its nuanced platform in an increasingly polarised political climate.

=== Bos wins RTL4 debate (3 January 2003) ===
On 3 January 2003, RTL4 aired a televised debate featuring the lead candidates of four major parties: Balkenende (CDA), Zalm (VVD), Bos (PvdA), and Marijnissen (SP). The debate, watched by approximately two million viewers, opened at 21:40 with a series of short introductory statements, followed by exchanges on major political themes. Marijnissen positioned himself in the opposition, while Bos attacked the Balkenende cabinet's lack of accomplishments, drawing the audience's first applause. Balkenende cited preventive searches; Bos noted this was originally a Labour proposal. On public safety, Zalm demanded more police, prosecutors and prison capacity; Bos argued social spending was also preventative; Marijnissen linked crime to educational and familial policy. A further question on individual self-defence produced rare unanimity—each leader acknowledged a conditional right to protect oneself. Balkenende's appeal to "norms and values" met with mixed reactions.

The discussion then shifted to immigration and the economy. 49% of viewers agreed with the notion that the Netherlands was "full," with Zalm affirming the sentiment, while Bos emphasized the country's duty to protect political refugees. Marijnissen warned against placing further burdens on vulnerable urban neighborhoods. On the economy, Bos attacked price hikes on health insurance premiums. Debate on a possible invasion of Iraq (opposed by 61% of viewers) followed, with Bos stating that Dutch involvement would only be acceptable with UN support, while Marijnissen firmly opposed military action. In the final segment, candidates were asked about coalition preferences. Marijnissen expressed openness toward Balkenende, Bos avoided speculation and emphasized restoring trust, Zalm reiterated his preference for a VVD–CDA coalition, and Balkenende declined to commit to specific partners. The debate ended just before 23:00 with post-debate analysis highlighting strong performances by Bos and Marijnissen, while Zalm and Balkenende were deemed less convincing.

Polls conducted immediately after the debate confirmed Bos as the clear winner. RTL News reported that over 40% of viewers selected Bos as the most effective debater, while Balkenende placed second with 19%. Volkskrant readers also overwhelmingly favored Bos (46%), followed by Marijnissen. Zalm, meanwhile, was widely seen as the evening's weakest performer. The strong showing by Bos led to a marked shift in the political landscape: A poll by Maurice de Hond conducted for SBS6 found that support for the PvdA rose sharply—from 28 to 35 seats—after the debate, while the VVD dropped from 27 to 24. This reversal meant that the previously expected CDA–VVD majority in the House of Representatives was no longer viable. Bos' debate victory triggered a new dynamic in the race, transforming the campaign into a direct contest between the CDA and PvdA to become to the largest party and thereby shape a centre-left or cente-right cabinet, to the detriment of SP and GroenLinks.

=== Commencement of Christian right campaigns (3–4 January 2003) ===
During the campaign, the CU and SGP both emphasized their Christian right stances, positioning themselves as correctives to the perceived moral shortcomings of the previous purple coalition. CU leader André Rouvoet opened the campaign on 4 January by urging Balkenende to adopt a stronger ethical agenda and criticising Zalm for attacking Christian education. Rouvoet refrained from discussing possible compromises, insisting that any participation in a future government must allow for open debate on contentious issues such as abortion, euthanasia, and same-sex marriage. Similarly, the SGP launched its campaign on 3 January in Hoevelaken, where party leader Bas Van der Vlies warned against tactical voting for the CDA while expressing support for Balkenende's return as prime minister. He argued for a strong SGP presence in Parliament to address issues the CDA neglected, including a full rejection of abortion and euthanasia and stricter media standards. Both parties opposed the idea of a religiously neutral state.

=== Mat Herben and the decline of the LPF (8 December 2002–8 January 2003) ===
On 8 December 2002, the Pim Fortuyn List (LPF) nominated Mat Herben as its lead candidate for the 2003 election. Herben, one of the party's most recognisable post-Fortuyn figures, had previously served as LPF parliamentary leader and was seen as a stabilising figure amid ongoing party disorder. His selection followed internal confusion, particularly surrounding Hilbrand Nawijn, who was still frontrunner as of 5 December, voluntarily stepping back to the 35th spot on 7 December—only to express ambitions of returning to parliament and eventually becoming prime minister later that day. The party adopted the slogan "Heb lef, stem LPF" ("Have courage, vote LPF" (Note: In Dutch, "Heb lef" rhymes with "Stem LPF" due to the pronunciation of the acronym. This rhyme is not retained in the provided English translation.)), paired with "Geef ons een tweede kans" ("Give us a second chance"), acknowledging past dysfunction while attempting to signal readiness for responsible governance. Herben positioned the LPF as the only reliable barrier against a potential CDA–PvdA coalition, arguing that only his party could prevent a centrist–left government. Notable people like Joost Eerdmans and Joao Varela also featured on the LPF list.

Despite these efforts, the LPF struggled to recapture the momentum it had enjoyed in 2002. Without Pim Fortuyn's charisma, the party was unable to dominate the national conversation as it had done months earlier. Though many of the concerns Fortuyn had raised—immigration, integration, crime—remained salient, the campaign's focus shifted towards economic stagnation, allowing Bos to gain traction by attacking the Balkenende Cabinet's fiscal policy. Meanwhile, established parties adopted stricter conservative positions to attract disaffected former LPF voters, effectively mainstreaming some of the LPF's positions. The ideological convergence left Herben's LPF appearing increasingly redundant, while the party's image—once that of a brash, disruptive force—was softened under Herben's measured leadership. Journalist Bert Wagendorp wrote: "If Fortuyn was the revolutionary, then Herben is the embodiment of the domestication of the revolution, and thus the symbol of the LPF's decline". His candidacy underlined the LPF's transformation into a conventional right-wing party, competing for relevance in a political landscape it had once upended.

By 7 January 2003, the LPF's fortunes had diminished considerably, with polls suggesting the party would win only four to five seats. Herben, now a more confident and composed figure than in previous months, acknowledged the party's early missteps and aimed to present a united, disciplined LPF. Despite modest rebranding efforts and informal campaign events meant to portray the LPF as more approachable, the party failed to regain momentum. Though Herben remained confident that the party could still mobilise non-voters and reach double digits, most observers saw a party in decline. During the 8 January debate at Erasmus University Rotterdam (broadcast by Twee Vandaag), Herben represented the LPF alongside leaders from five other parties. While he responded with composure to criticism—particularly from Marijnissen, who challenged the LPF's immigration rhetoric—Herben struggled to articulate a compelling or distinctive alternative. His performance was serviceable but lacked dynamism.

=== PvdA momentum; "More red in the streets" (3–19 January 2003) ===
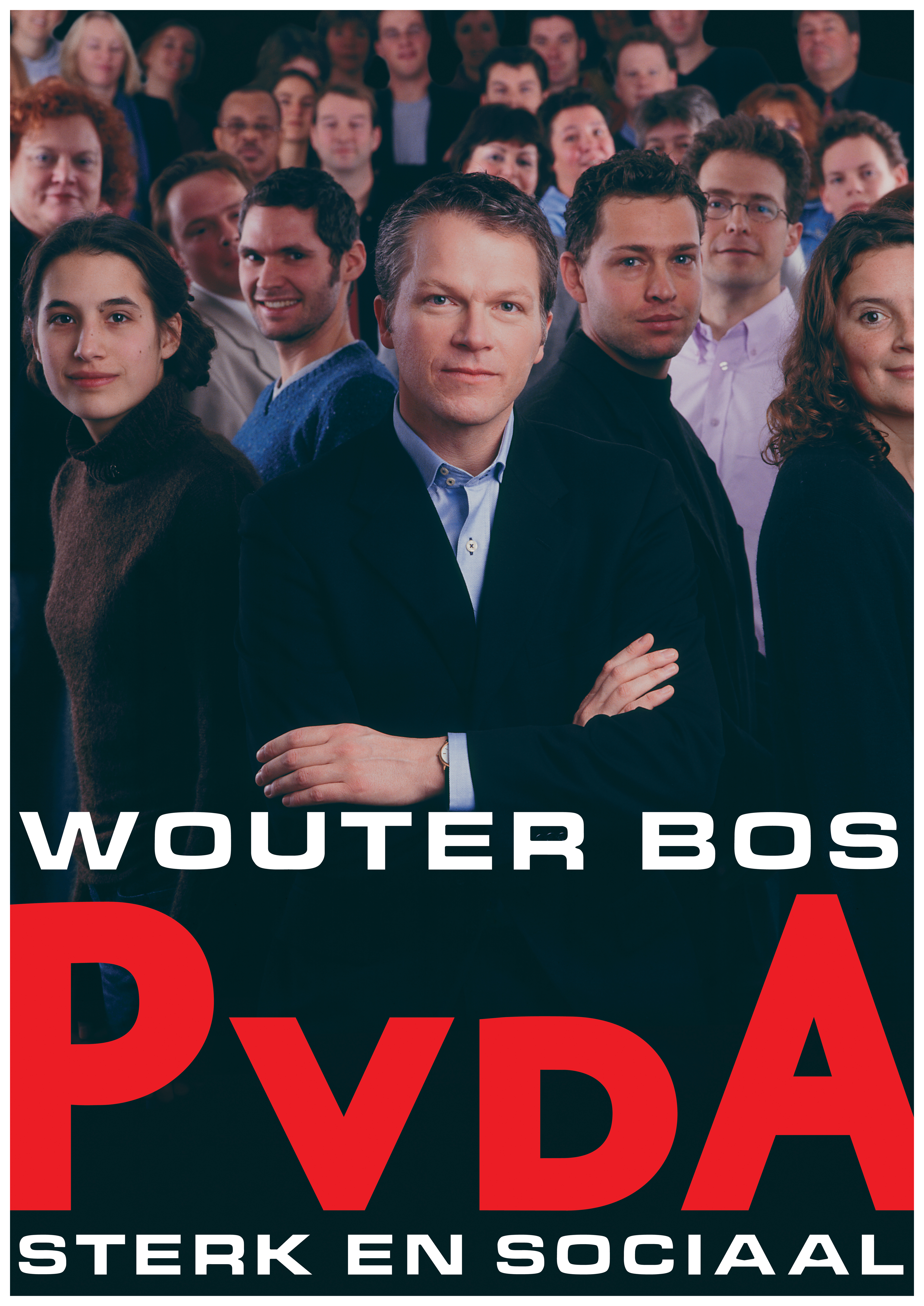
2003 campaign poster for the Labour Party

The campaign of the PvdA gained significant momentum following Bos's strong performance in the 3 January debate, which marked the beginning of a steep rise in polling numbers. Forecast to win 29–30 seats in the first week of January, the PvdA climbed steadily to 43 in the final NIPO poll before the 22 January election, even surpassing the CDA, which polled at 42. Interview/NSS polls reflected a similar trend. This unexpected surge forced the PvdA into serious contention for power and prompted discussion of possible coalition alignments. Bos's clear break with the liberal legacy of the Kok cabinets and his critique of excessive privatization further distinguished the campaign. On 4 January, Bos officially launched the party's election campaign from a soapbox in Rotterdam, distancing himself from the Third Way and stating he himself had once been too "market-minded."

To consolidate voter enthusiasm, the PvdA undertook an extensive grassroots campaign under the banner "Meer rood op straat" (More red in the streets), visiting approximately 50 cities across the country. The campaign had been prepared in 2002 and took place from 4 to 21 January 2003. Candidate MPs and local figures distributed nearly one million flyers at schools, marketplaces, transport hubs, and shopping centers. Conversations with citizens revolved around key themes such as public safety, healthcare, housing, and employment. As polling numbers climbed, attention turned toward the question of leadership. Bos, who had earlier indicated he would not pursue the premiership, came under pressure to identify a candidate. He deferred, stating on 14 January that he would only make such an announcement if the PvdA consistently led in all major polls, insisting the campaign focus remain on policy rather than personalities.

As pressure continued to mount amidst growing prospects, Bos announced Amsterdam mayor Job Cohen as the party's candidate for Prime Minister on 19 January. Cohen accepted reluctantly, citing a national need for political stability after a year of turbulence. While Bos cited Cohen's "commitment and integrity", the nomination also drew criticism, particularly from the CDA and VVD, who questioned Cohen's refusal to participate in debates. Cohen emphasized that he would accept the premiership only with broad coalition support and a suitable governing agreement. He positioned himself as a moderate, invoking his past roles as a state secretary and as a municipal leader engaged in security policy. His selection also served to reinforce Bos's commitment to parliamentary leadership and dualism.

=== "A different league" (12 January 2003) ===
On 12 January 2003, Radio 1 aired a televised debate featuring the lead candidates of several major political parties. A focus group of 25 undecided voters observed the event in real-time, using perception analysers—remote-control-style devices allowing participants to rate their reactions moment by moment. The resulting data showed notable fluctuations. Statements from Balkenende, Zalm and Herben on law and order consistently pushed approval ratings to 80 or higher, especially when advocating stricter sentences or highlighting safety concerns. Conversely, when Femke Halsema (GL) critiqued calls for harsher justice policies, viewer ratings dropped below 50. Balkenende himself saw declining approval when defending special religious schools, suggesting his message failed to resonate compared to the broader concern over Islamic education. These perception ratings underscored how television debates could hinge not on detailed policy, but on rhetorical clarity and emotive framing—traits increasingly crucial in political campaigning.

The debate's strategic implications extended beyond its immediate audience. While the sample group was not statistically representative, its reactions revealed useful insights. Voters rewarded candidates who communicated with clarity, and penalised complex policy detail. Balkenende's cautious tone led some participants to describe him as evasive or overly soft. Likewise, Bos was seen as too calculating. Zalm performed well when emotionally assertive, but lost ground when delving into technical healthcare reform. Meanwhile, de Graaf (D66), excluded from the debate, sought to circumvent his marginalisation through paid advertisements aired before and after the programme. He later commented: "If you're not among the chosen ones selected by the media, then you play in a different league."

Due to its reduced parliamentary presence since May 2002, D66 was not invited to participate in the major televised debates, including the 12 January debate. This exclusion prompted a formal complaint from party chairman Alexander Pechtold, who criticised the public broadcaster for exercising political influence by deciding which parties receive airtime. In an effort to circumvent this marginalisation, the D66 campaign team purchased all available advertising slots immediately before and after the Radio 1 debate, securing nearly five uninterrupted minutes in which de Graaf could present the party's platform and respond to the debate's themes. Beyond this, the campaign relied heavily on street-level visibility and smaller radio debate appearances to gain traction. The message focused predominantly on education and the knowledge economy, with D66 pledging the largest investment—€2.5 billion—of any party. Despite a coherent campaign and targeted messaging, these efforts failed to generate upward movement in the polls.

=== Exit poll and final debate (21 January 2003) ===
The final Interview/NSS poll, released in the morning of 21 January, indicated that the PvdA had moved ahead of the CDA, with 42 projected seats compared to the CDA's 40. This development extended the upward trend observed for the PvdA throughout January and reflected a decline of four seats for the CDA in just one week. The VVD and LPF showed minor increases, rising to 29 and 7 seats respectively, while smaller left-wing parties experienced losses. GroenLinks fell to 7 seats, and the SP to 11, reflecting voters' consolidation around major parties. A CDA–VVD coalition (69) remained short of a majority (76 seats), whereas a coalition of the CDA and PvdA would secure 82 seats. According to pollster Maurice de Hond, strategic behaviour among VVD voters could still alter the outcome, particularly if they shifted to the CDA to prevent a PvdA victory. A significant portion of the electorate—20%—remained undecided.

The final televised debate, held on 21 January and broadcast on Nederland 2, included the lead candidates of six parties—CDA, PvdA, VVD, LPF, SP, and GroenLinks—and drew three million viewers. D66 was again excluded. The debate featured extensive discussion on integration, criminal justice, and political leadership. Balkenende criticised Bos for a perceived lack of firmness on integration policy, while Bos responded by pointing to inconsistency within CDA-led municipalities concerning heroin distribution initiatives. Halsema (GL) repeatedly called for clarity from Balkenende regarding the exclusion of the LPF from any future coalition. Balkenende acknowledged that the short-lived government involving the LPF had failed and expressed regret. The contributions of Marijnissen (SP) and Herben (LPF) were relatively limited. The debate served primarily to reinforce previously stated positions, with participants focusing on their respective party platforms rather than introducing new proposals or altering the tone of the campaign.

While Bos had received favourable assessments in earlier televised appearances, his performance in the final debate was not regarded as notably stronger than those of his opponents. The CDA and VVD reaffirmed their intention to govern jointly, despite the absence of a projected majority and Balkenende's stated reluctance to include the LPF. Zalm did not exclude the LPF entirely, suggesting its participation might still be necessary. Halsema received the most positive viewer evaluations, which may have helped reduce the scale of anticipated electoral losses for her party. Although 31 percent of voters were still undecided, polling suggested that 48% of these were considering the CDA and 32% the PvdA. The debate did not substantially shift the campaign narrative.

=== The PvdD and LN's elusive seats (22 January 2002) ===
In the lead-up to the elections, the newly founded Party for the Animals (PvdD) faced the challenge of selecting a suitable lead candidate. While co-founder Lieke Keller was a natural candidate to lead, her existing role as director of Bont voor Dieren, and her extensive political contacts, made her unsuitable for front-line candidacy. To preserve ongoing lobbying efforts, Keller stepped back, and her colleague Marianne Thieme—a relatively unknown but committed figure—was selected as spokesperson. The party initially sought a celebrity to head the electoral list, but when this proved unfeasible, Thieme was put forward. Some founders saw the effort as a publicity stunt rather than a serious political bid. Niko Koffeman, who had previously overseen campaigns for the SP, nonetheless took an active role, shaping the party's program and advising on media outreach. As media attention grew, notably following an interview in Het Parool on 6 December 2002, Thieme's public profile grew. The campaign relied on securing free publicity.

The PvdD's campaign focused on a cluster of settlements in South Holland: Leiden, Warmond, Voorschoten, Oegstgeest, Jacobswoude and Hillegom. Despite modest resources, the party secured several hundred members and operated on a total budget of €30,000—two-thirds of which came from hotelier Irene Visser. This was spent primarily on posters and flyers. However, an administrative error led to a significant setback: The PvdD's candidate list for Overijssel was submitted 40 minutes past the legal deadline, and although the documents had been faxed earlier, the Electoral Council and the Council of State both upheld the disqualification. As a result, the party was barred from competing in the province. Thieme criticized the ruling as excessively rigid and suggested that the presence of established parties within the Council of State might discourage political newcomers.

When votes were counted, the PvdD came just short of winning a parliamentary seat. Initial projections by most major media outlets showed the party below the threshold, though a Radio 1 forecast briefly placed it at one seat. Ultimately, the party received 47,754 votes—just 518 votes below the threshold for parliamentary representation. This narrow margin raised questions about whether participation in Overijssel might have altered the result. Despite the disappointment, the party issued a statement expressing optimism, noting that such voter support was achieved with minimal resources, media exposure, and preparation. Party officials framed the outcome as evidence of latent public backing for a political movement grounded in animal liberation. While the PvdD missed entering parliament, it nonetheless outperformed Livable Netherlands (LN), which lost both its seats after securing just 38,856 votes.

The LN's election campaign received scant attention from the media. The party's lead candidate—Haitske van de Linde—was disappointed by the result, having counted on one seat.

== Results ==
The election had a voter turnout of 80.04%, an increase of 0.98 percentage points compared to 2002. The increase of voter turnout surprised many observers, given the expectation that many disappointed LPF voters from 2002 would remain home. The DNPP surmised: "It is possible that the increasing polarization between left and right drew more voters to the polls after all."

The LPF's seat count dropped from 26 to 8.

The race of which party would become the largest was eventually won by the CDA, which went from 43 to 44 seats, ensuring a continuation of Balkenende's career as prime minister.

Most of the smaller parties on both the left and right side did not experience significant changes. Several other parties (among them Leefbaar Nederland, a 2002 newcomer) did not manage to get over the threshold and thus gained no seats.

After severe disagreements had frustrated the formation of a CDA–PvdA cabinet, a CDA–VVD–D66 cabinet was formed on 27 May 2003, with Balkenende as prime minister.

Party	Votes	%	Seats	+/–
Christian Democratic Appeal	2,763,480	28.62	44	+1
Labour Party	2,631,363	27.26	42	+19
People's Party for Freedom and Democracy	1,728,707	17.91	28	+4
Socialist Party	609,723	6.32	9	0
Pim Fortuyn List	549,975	5.70	8	–18
GroenLinks	495,802	5.14	8	–2
Democrats 66	393,333	4.07	6	–1
Christian Union	204,694	2.12	3	–1
Reformed Political Party	150,305	1.56	2	0
Party for the Animals	47,754	0.49	0	New
Livable Netherlands	38,894	0.40	0	–2
Party of the Future	13,845	0.14	0	0
Ratelband List	9,045	0.09	0	New
Durable Netherlands	7,271	0.08	0	0
New Communist Party–NCPN	4,854	0.05	0	0
DeConservatieven.nl	2,521	0.03	0	New
Progressive Integration Party	1,623	0.02	0	New
Alliance for Renewal and Democracy	990	0.01	0	New
Veldhoen List	296	0.00	0	New
Total	9,654,475	100.00	150	0
Valid votes	9,654,475	99.87		
Invalid/blank votes	12,127	0.13		
Total votes	9,666,602	100.00		
Registered voters/turnout	12,076,711	80.04		
Source: Kiesraad

=== By province ===
In 2002, the CDA won pluralities in every province except Groningen, where the PvdA narrowly retained its plurality by a margin of 1.7%. In 2003, the Labour Party stood resurgent, regaining the pluralities in Drenthe and Friesland that it won in 1998, as well as North Holland (last won in 1994), Flevoland, and South Holland (last won in 1989). However, the CDA retained its pluralities in the other six provinces. Five of the CDA's provinces had been won by the PvdA in 1998; the other (Utrecht) by the VVD.

In 2003, the PvdA again achieved its highest provincial vote share in Groningen, where it secured 39.6% of the vote. Its lowest performance occurred in Utrecht, where it obtained 23.5%. The most substantial increase in vote share for the PvdA, relative to the 2002 election, also occurred in Groningen, with a gain of 15.7pp, while the smallest increase was recorded in Utrecht, amounting to 10.4pp. The CDA attained its strongest result in Limburg, with 37.5%, and its weakest in Groningen, at 20.6%. The largest year-on-year gain for the CDA occurred in Zeeland, where the party increased its share by 2.4%, whereas its most significant decline was in Groningen, where support fell by 1.6%. The Pim Fortuyn List (LPF) experienced a universal decline in support; its highest remaining share was recorded in South Holland (8.7%), while its lowest was in Groningen (3.4%). The largest decline occurred in Limburg (–13.7pp), with the most moderate decline observed in Overijssel (–7.8pp).

Some commentators proposed that the PvdA's resurgence marked a return to 1998. However, a comparison of the PvdA's 2003 performance with its 1998 baseline reveals a limited return to pre-Fortuyn levels. In only three provinces—Groningen, Drenthe, and North Holland—did the party surpass its 1998 vote share, with respective increases of 2.5, 0.5, and 0.6 pp. Friesland was nearly identical to its 1998 performance, with a marginal decline of 0.1pp. In all other provinces, the PvdA failed to recover fully, with the most pronounced deficits observed in North Brabant (–5.3pp) and Zeeland (–4.0pp). In contrast, the CDA succeeded in preserving the majority of its electoral gains from 2002. In eight provinces, including Zeeland, Flevoland, and North Brabant, the party increased its vote share further, with gains ranging from 1.1 to 2.4 pp. The CDA experienced only limited declines in the remaining provinces, none exceeding 1.6pp. As such, while the PvdA's resurgence was geographically constrained, the CDA largely consolidated its elevated position attained during the 2002 election.

The VVD registered gains in all twelve provinces compared to 2002. The largest increases occurred in Flevoland (+4.1pp) and South Holland (+4.0pp), while the smallest improvement was observed in Groningen (+0.2pp). Despite these gains, the VVD did not recover its 1998 vote share in any province. The narrowest gap between 2003 and 1998 figures appeared in Groningen (–3.4 points), and the most substantial deficit was found in Utrecht (–7.3pp). D66, by contrast, experienced declines in all provinces relative to 2002. The most significant decreases were recorded in Friesland (–1.4pp) and Limburg (–1.2pp), while the most modest was in Utrecht (–0.7). In no province did D66 come close to its 1998 results; its best performance relative to that baseline was in Overijssel (–3.6pp), with the weakest relative showing in North Holland (–5.8pp).

Results by province
Province	CDA	PvdA	VVD	SP	LPF	GL	D66	CU	SGP	Others
Drenthe	24.8	37.8	16.8	5.1	3.8	4.1	3.4	2.9	0.3	1.0
Flevoland	24.7	25.5	21.3	5.4	7.0	4.8	4.1	3.6	2.1	1.5
Friesland	32.0	33.5	12.6	6.0	3.7	4.5	2.8	3.2	0.5	1.2
Gelderland	31.6	26.6	16.5	5.8	4.2	5.1	3.6	2.5	2.9	1.2
Groningen	20.6	39.6	13.0	7.3	3.4	6.0	3.9	4.7	0.3	1.2
Limburg	37.5	26.6	14.1	7.2	5.3	4.5	2.9	0.3	0.0	1.6
North Brabant	33.9	23.6	18.2	8.4	5.6	4.2	3.6	0.6	0.4	1.5
North Holland	21.1	29.0	21.5	7.0	6.0	6.9	5.7	1.0	0.2	1.6
Overijssel	36.6	27.3	13.5	4.9	3.4	4.2	3.0	4.4	2.1	1.6
South Holland	24.9	25.9	19.8	5.3	8.7	4.7	4.3	2.2	2.5	1.7
Utrecht	27.3	23.5	20.4	5.9	4.8	6.7	5.2	3.1	2.0	1.1
Zeeland	32.0	23.8	15.7	5.0	5.3	3.8	2.7	2.9	7.7	1.1

=== 5 largest municipalities ===
The PvdA again won a plurality in the capital, Amsterdam, as it had in every general election since 1946. In fact, the PvdA won pluralities in all five of the country's largest municipalities: Amsterdam, Rotterdam, The Hague, and Eindhoven with margins ranging from 27.1% (Eindhoven) to 38.2% (Amsterdam). This was the first time that the PvdA won all of these municipalities in a general election. In these urban areas, the PvdA outperformed their respective provinces by margins ranging from 3.2pp (The Hague) to 10.3pp (Rotterdam).

Results in the five largest municipalities
Municipality	CDA	PvdA	VVD	SP	LPF	GL	D66	CU	SGP	Others
Amsterdam	9.7 (36 352)	38.2 (143 188)	15.6 (58 528)	9.9 (37 127)	5.8 (21 658)	11.0 (41 289)	7.1 (26 439)	0.7 (2 670)	0.1 (237)	1.9 (7 287)
Rotterdam	14.6 (43 639)	36.2 (108 252)	14.8 (44 159)	6.9 (20 504)	13.8 (41 304)	5.6 (16 837)	4.0 (11 861)	1.6 (4 727)	0.7 (2 135)	2.1 (6 211)
The Hague	18.3 (46 197)	29.1 (73 502)	22.5 (56 995)	5.8 (14 754)	8.5 (21 449)	6.8 (17 064)	5.6 (14 208)	1.1 (2 796)	0.5 (1 158)	1.9 (4 806)
(Utrecht (municipality)) Utrecht	16.6 (25 660)	31.3 (48 302)	16.7 (25 809)	8.8 (13 576)	4.6 (7 117)	11.9 (18 387)	7.1 (11 020)	1.3 (2 068)	0.3 (444)	1.2 (1 845)
Eindhoven	25.4 (29 476)	27.1 (31 424)	17.5 (20 320)	10.2 (11 806)	5.9 (6 818)	6.2 (7 202)	4.9 (5 641)	0.9 (1 034)	0.1 (96)	1.8 (2 097)

=== By prior vote ===
Of the 1.61 million LPF voters from 2002, ~401,000 (~25%) did not vote in 2003, according to interview/NSS. Of those who did return, 38% returned to vote for the LPF, according to Holsteyn (2005), while the rest mostly went to the VDD (26%) and the CDA (21%). Given the sample of LPF voters from 2002, Holsteyn's statistics have a 9% margin of error.

While not providing specific figures, the DNPP (''Documentatiecentrum Nederlandse Politieke Partijen''; Documentation centre Dutch political parties) states that most of the PvdA's new votes came from the CDA and GroenLinks, while LPF, SP, D66 and VVD voters also defected to the PvdA by smaller margins.

2002 vote → 2003 vote
2002 vote (sample size)	CDA	PvdA	VVD	SP	LPF	GL	D66	CU	SGP	LN
CDA voters (2002); N = 337, MOE = 5%	80	9	4	1	2	2	1	2	0	0
PvdA voters (2002); N = 206, MOE = 7%	3	91	0	2	0	2	2	0	0	0
VVD voters (2002); N = 167, MOE = 8%	10	4	77	1	2	0	5	0	0	0
SP voters (2002); N = 96, MOE = 10%	2	19	4	60	0	5	8	0	0	0
LPF voters (2002); N = 127, MOE = 9%	21	8	26	2	38	0	2	1	0	0
GL voters (2002); N = 121, MOE = 9%	3	32	2	9	1	48	5	0	0	0
D66 voters (2002); N = 83, MOE = 11%	5	33	5	4	0	6	47	0	0	1
CU voters (2002); N = 43, MOE = 15%	19	0	0	7	0	0	0	74	0	0
SGP voters (2002); N = 20, MOE = 20%	0	0	0	0	0	0	0	5	95	0
LN voters (2002); N = 10, MOE = 31%	10	20	20	0	0	10	20	0	0	20

=== Analysis ===
On 25 January, René Moerland of NRC Handelsblad reported on the contrasting interpretations of the 2003 election results, which appeared to mark a return to the political landscape of 1998, with the CDA and PvdA again dominant. While some analysts, such as Joop van Holsteyn, viewed the 2002 election as an anomaly driven by transient concerns about safety rather than deep political alienation, others, like Gabriël van den Brink, pointed to persistent frustration with an unresponsive and bureaucratic state. Although the LPF had collapsed and Fortuyn was no longer present, the structural dissatisfaction with governance remained. The modern voter, now often detached and volatile, increasingly engaged with politics as a media spectacle, described by Jos de Beus as a "spectator democracy." Martijn Lampert of Motivaction identified the pivotal electorate as the urban "moderne burgerij" (Note: Moderne translates to modern. Burgerij can be translated either as citizenry or bourgeoisie.), drawn to candidates with energetic presentation. Yet, as Mark Bovens noted, the national political class was increasingly constrained, with real authority shifting to the European Union and other international bodies, rendering domestic promises ever more precarious.

=== Maps ===
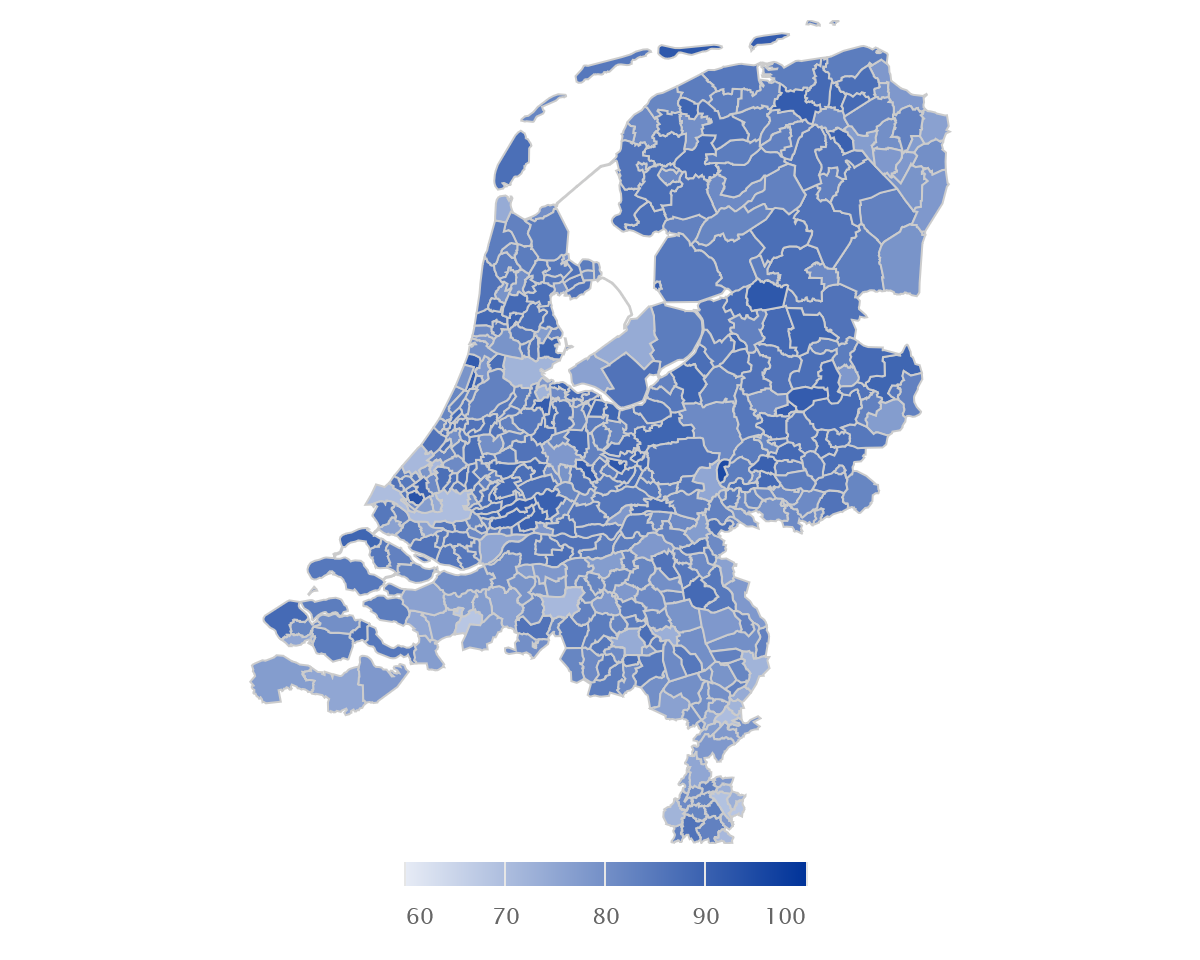
Voter turnout by municipality

Results by province, shaded according to the vote share won by largest party

== Aftermath ==
=== Cabinet formation ===
After the general election of 22 January 2003, a cabinet formation took place in Netherlands. This resulted in the formation of the second Balkenende cabinet on 27 May 2003, comprising the Christian Democratic Appeal (CDA), People's Party for Freedom and Democracy (VVD) and Democrats 66 (D66).

=== 2003 Dutch provincial elections ===
The 2003 Dutch provincial elections were held on 11 maart 2003, less than 2 months after the general election. Due to their chronological proximity, the general and provincial election campaigns were fused into one by the CDA, meaning that the campaign seamlessly continued after election day on 22 January. In contrast, the PvdA ceased campaigning after election day and resumed on 22 February, though it used the same campaign infrastructure and strategies, resuming the "Meer rood op straat" (More red in the streets) campaign from the general election on 27 February.

== See also ==
- List of candidates in the 2003 Dutch general election
