= Bas van der Vlies =

Dutch politician (1942–2021)

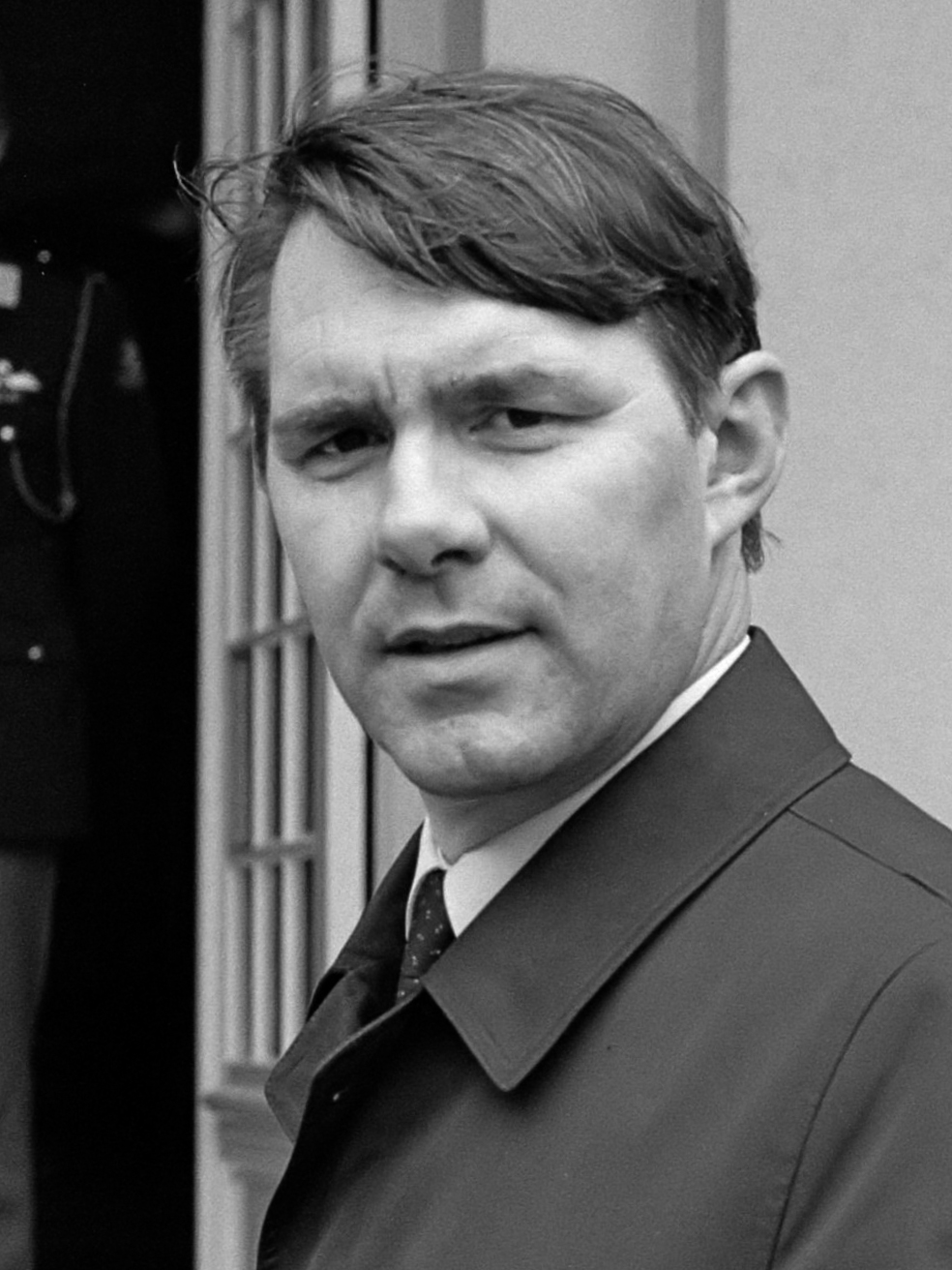
- van der Vlies in 1986

Parliamentary leader in the House of Representatives
- In office 22 May 1986 – 9 June 2010
- Preceded by: Henk van Rossum
- Succeeded by: Kees van der Staaij
- Parliamentary group: Reformed Political Party

Leader of the Reformed Political Party
- In office 22 May 1986 – 27 March 2010
- Preceded by: Henk van Rossum
- Succeeded by: Kees van der Staaij

Member of the House of Representatives
- In office 10 June 1981 – 17 June 2010

Personal details
- Born: Bastiaan Johannis van der Vlies; 29 June 1942 Sliedrecht, Netherlands
- Died: 8 November 2021 (aged 79) Utrecht, Netherlands
- Party: Reformed Political Party (from 1961)
- Spouse: Willy Coster (m. 1968)
- Children: Four children
- Education: Delft University of Technology (Bachelor of Engineering, Master of Engineering)
- Occupation: Politician · Engineer · Teacher

Bastiaan Johannis "Bas" van der Vlies (29 June 1942 – 7 November 2021) was a Dutch politician of the Reformed Political Party (SGP) and teacher.

He was an MP from 10 June 1981 to 17 June 2010. He was also both Parliamentary leader and Leader of the Reformed Political Party from 22 May 1986 to 10 May 2010. Van der Vlies obtained a hydraulic engineering degree from the Delft University of Technology. He worked as a maths teacher before becoming a politician.

== Decorations ==
Honours
Ribbon bar	Honour	Country	Date	Comment
	Knight of the Order of the Netherlands Lion	Netherlands	29 April 1994	
	Knight of the Order of Orange-Nassau	Netherlands	16 June 2010	

== Electoral history ==
Electoral history of Kees van der Staaij
Year	Body	Party	Pos.	Votes	Result		Ref.
Year	Body	Party	Pos.	Votes	Party seats	Individual	Ref.
1971	House of Representatives	Reformed Political Party	8	143	3	Lost	
1972	House of Representatives	Reformed Political Party	3	1,395	4	Lost	
1977	House of Representatives	Reformed Political Party	3	1,395	4	Lost	
1981	House of Representatives	Reformed Political Party	3	20,329	3	Won	
1982	House of Representatives	Reformed Political Party	3	3,221	3	Won	
1986	House of Representatives	Reformed Political Party	1	150,549	3	Won	
1989	House of Representatives	Reformed Political Party	1	156,668	3	Won	
1994	House of Representatives	Reformed Political Party	1	140,373	2	Won	
1998	House of Representatives	Reformed Political Party	1	140,174	3	Won	
2002	House of Representatives	Reformed Political Party	1	147,030	2	Won	
2003	House of Representatives	Reformed Political Party	1	135,567	2	Won	
2006	House of Representatives	Reformed Political Party	1	141,636	2	Won	

Party political offices
Preceded by Henk van Rossum; 1982	Lead candidate of the Reformed Political Party; 1986, 1989, 1994, 1998, 2002, 2003, 2006	Succeeded by Kees van der Staaij; 2010
Preceded by Henk van Rossum	Leader of the Reformed; Political Party; 1986–2010	Succeeded by Kees van der Staaij
Preceded by Henk van Rossum	Parliamentary leader of the Reformed Political Party in the House of Representatives; 1986–2010	Succeeded by Kees van der Staaij
Honorary titles
Preceded by Gert Schutte	Dean of the House of Representatives; 2001–2010	Succeeded by Sharon Dijksma
