= Cor Eberhard =

Dutch politician

Cornelis Reindert Eberhard
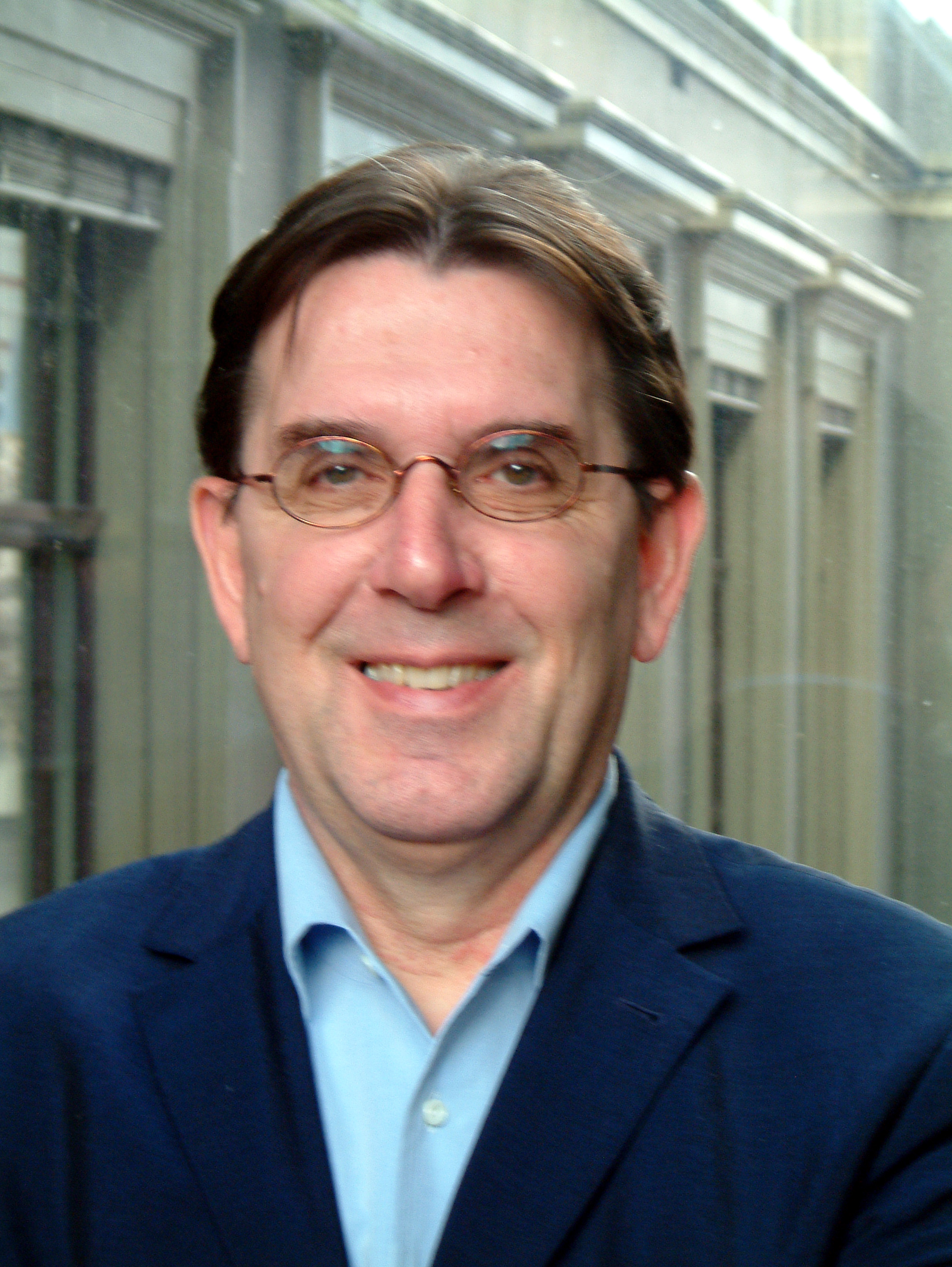
- Image of Cornelis Reindert Eberhard

Member of the House of Representatives
- In office 2002–2003

Personal details
- Born: Cornelis Reindert Eberhard; 9 January 1947 (age 79) Amsterdam
- Party: Independent (2002); Pim Fortuyn List (2002); Liveable Netherlands (2002)
- Occupation: Politician

Cornelis Reindert (Cor) Eberhard (born 1947 in Amsterdam) is a former Dutch politician.

From 28 May 2002 he was a member of the House of Representatives of the Netherlands for the Lijst Pim Fortuyn (LPF) and from 2002 for Groep De Jong with fellow former LPF MP Winny de Jong. He later co-founded the DeConservatieven.nl party with De Jong.

== Career ==
Eberhard was initially a member of the Liveable Netherlands (LN) party, but following Pim Fortuyn's dismissal as party leader he joined Fortuyn's new party, the Pim Fortuyn List. He helped to set up the LFP's press office and recruited other former LN members into the LPF. During the campaign, he courted minor controversy when it was found he had been involved in the running of phone sex lines and pornographic websites. He was elected to the Member of the House of Representatives for the LPF in 2002, but left the party due to internal disputes and joined Winny de Jong in Groep De Jong. The pair later set up a new political party called Conservatives.nl but were unsuccessful at getting re-elected.
