= John Leerdam =

Dutch politician (born 1961)

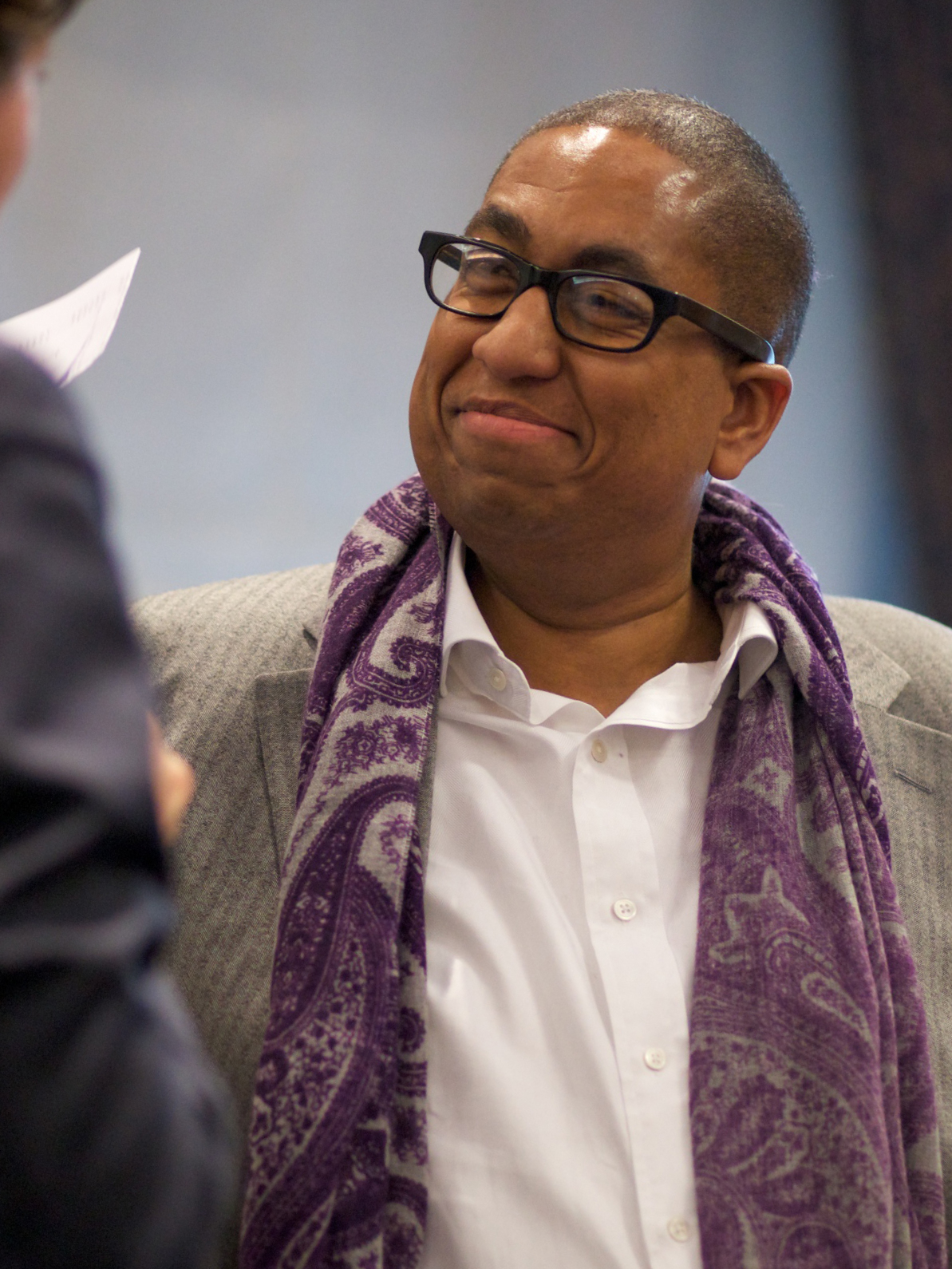

Member of the House of Representatives
- In office 28 February 2012 – 5 April 2012

Member of the House of Representatives
- In office 30 January 2003 – 17 June 2010

Personal details
- Born: John Arnold Walther Julius Leerdam; 23 July 1961 (age 65) Willemstad, Curaçao
- Party: Labour Party
- Education: Columbia University (MFA)
- Occupation: Politician assistant professor program director teacher author

John Arnold Walther Julius Leerdam (born 23 July 1961) is a Dutch politician of the Labour Party (PvdA). He served as a Member of the House of Representatives from 30 January 2003 until 17 June 2010 and again from 28 February 2012 until 5 April 2012.

== Biography ==
=== Early life ===
Born on Curaçao, John Arnold Walther Julius Leerdam, the son of a Surinamese father and a mother from the island of Saint Kitts. In 1982 he moved to study in the Netherlands, where he trained as a theater director and drama teacher at the Amsterdam Theatre School. From 1986 to 1987 and from 1991 to 1996 Leerdam stayed in New York City, where he followed courses in film directing and production; at the Columbia University and got a Master of Fine Arts. He took an additional course in international and public affairs, and received management training communication skills. He got further actor training at the American Musical and Dramatic Academy, and director training at the Tisch School of the Arts. His specialization is in 'Black theater' and 'Musical theater'. Later, he was involved in various theater companies.

From 1996 Leerdam was employed at the Cosmic Theater in Amsterdam, where in 1999 he became director and artistic director. He continued this until he joined the Dutch general election of 2003 was chosen on behalf of the Labour Party.

=== Politics ===
In the House of Representatives he was involved with the Antillean affairs and cultural policy. He argued in a note in 2005 for an active cultural policy. Leerdam was Vice Chairman of the Parliamentary Standing Committee for Dutch Antillean and Aruban Affairs. In the Dutch general election of 2006 he was reelected. In the Dutch general election of 2010 he was on place 33 on the list of candidates, which was not enough to be elected.

On 29 February 2012 he was nevertheless installed as a member of House of Representatives, in connection with the temporary absence of Sharon Dijksma because of maternity leave. On 3 April 2012 reporter Lex Uiting asked for the morning show of radio DJ Giel Beelen; Leerdam what he thought of the early release of terrorist suspect Joel Jablabla. Leerdam acted as if he had studied extensively in the case and that he knew more about the alleged perils around the nonexistent Jablabla and further says that "our deputy leader Jeroen Dijsselbloem already talked about." On 4 April Leerdam resigned as a Member of the House of Representatives because he thought that his credibility was damaged after his remarks in the interview. As of 2024, he served as an initiator of the National Slavery Museum in Amsterdam, with a planned opening date of 2030.

=== Personal ===
In 2005, Leerdam directed on the occasion of 30 years of independence of Suriname's play The Tears of Den Uyl, which is about the fictional encounter between the Dutch journalist Han de Graaf and Jozef Slagveer, a Surinamese journalist, in 1982, one of the victims of the December murders. Joop den Uyl was Prime Minister during the decolonization of Suriname and was also a strong supporter. Leerdam made in the piece a warning not to make the same mistake with the West Indies.

Leerdam was invested as a Knight of the Order of Orange-Nassau and received on 8 September 2006 the Lifetime Service Award from the Council for Opportunity in Education, an award for his commitment to creating opportunities for migrants. In 2024, American foreign affairs secretary Antony Blinken presented him with a Global Anti-Racism Champions Award.
