= Joanneke Kruijsen =

Dutch politician (1969–2016)

Member of the House of Representatives
- In office 30 January 2003 – 30 November 2006

Personal details
- Born: 10 January 1969 Nijmegen, Netherlands
- Died: 28 May 2016 (aged 47) Huntly, Scotland, UK
- Party: Labour Party

Joanne Hélène Josephine "Joanneke" Kruijsen (10 January 1969 – 28 May 2016) was a Dutch politician and sustainability researcher. She was a member of the Labour Party and served in the House of Representatives between 2003 and 2006.

== Career ==
Kruijsen was born on 10 January 1969 in Nijmegen. She grew up in Berg en Dal. She studied public administration and industrial design at Delft University of Technology between 1987 and 1994. Kruijsen subsequently attended the Open University in the Netherlands from 1994 to 1995 to study environmental management.

Kruijsen was elected in the 2003 Dutch general election for the Labour Party. She was a member of the House of Representatives between 30 January 2003 and 30 November 2006, not being a candidate in the 2006 Dutch general election. During her time in the House she was mainly concerned with environmental policy.

After her time in politics Kruijsen owned her own shop in sustainable clothing. In 2010 she moved to Scotland, where she became a researcher and later fellow at the Center for Understanding Sustainable Practice at Robert Gordon University in Aberdeen. At the Center she undertook research on behavioural change and sustainable practice.

She died in Huntly, Scotland on 28 May 2016.
