= Het Goede Doel =

Dutch pop music group

Het Goede Doel (English: The Charity or The Good Cause) is a Dutch pop-group fronted by Henk Westbroek and Henk Temming as founding members.

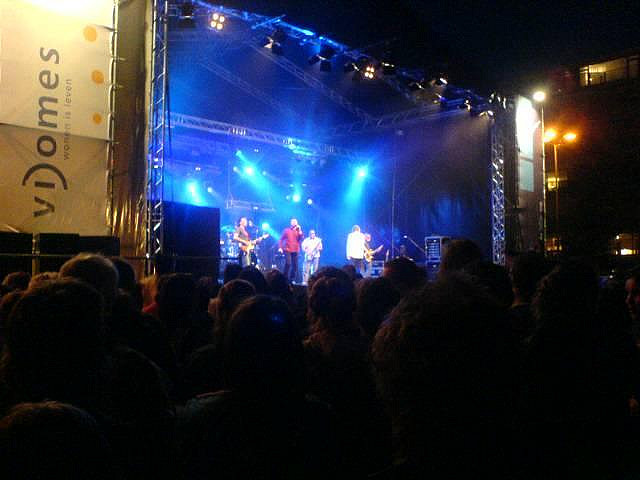
Het Goede Doel performing in 2008

The original line-up, formed in 1979, was completed by Sander van Herk (guitar), Ronald Jongeneel, Stephan Wienjus (bass) and Ab Tamboer (drums). Others joining in later included Arnold van Dongen (guitar), Lené te Voorhuis (bass), Toni Peroni (the father of Tony Junior; drums) and Danny Sahupala (drums).

In 1982 they had their breakthrough hit with "België (Is er leven op Pluto?)"; inspired by the international success of VOF de Kunst's "Suzanne" they released an English version ("Luxemburg") in 1985, naming themselves either HGD or The Good Cause.

Afterwards the group was reduced to a nucleus of Westbroek, Temming and Van Herk; they broke up in 1991 and focused on solo projects. In 2001 the band played a reunion-show in the classic line-up to celebrate their 10th break-up anniversary. Westbroek and Temming continued and released three more albums.
