= Party of the Future =

Dutch political party

Party of the Future Partij van de Toekomst
- Abbreviation: PvdT
- Chairman: Johan Vlemmix
- Founder: Johan Vlemmix
- Founded: 2002
- Dissolved: 3 May 2020
- Headquarters: Eindhoven
- Ideology: Direct democracy Populism
- Colors: Orange; White; Purple

The Party of the Future (Dutch: Partij van de Toekomst, PvdT) was a political party of the Netherlands. Although the party never came close to obtaining a seat in the House of Representatives, it received wide media attraction due to its leader, media personality Johan Vlemmix, as well as its frequent publicity stunts.

== History ==
Dutch entrepreneur Johan Vlemmix founded his own political party in 2002. In February 2003, fellow media personality Emile Ratelband and Vlemmix attracted media attention in the Netherlands with wanting to hand over a peace flag to both Mick Jagger and Saddam Hussein at the same moment.

Before the 2002 Dutch general election, Vlemmix was approached by Pim Fortuyn, who had wanted to take the name Party of the Future. Vlemmix refused to give him this name, which led to Fortuyn taking part as Lijst Pim Fortuyn.

Vlemmix continued to campaign under the party banner throughout its existence, including in municipality elections in Eindhoven in 2010, 2012, 2014 and 2018. In 2014 his platform included changes to drug policy and women's right to go topless.

== Dissolution of Vlemmix's PvdT ==
In 2020, politician Henk Krol prepared to establish his own Party for the Future (PvdT), but he discovered that the abbreviation PvdT had already been claimed by Vlemmix's party. Vlemmix granted the abbreviation to Krol and supported him in his decision to establish his own party. Vlemmix also granted the domain name to Krol.

Nevertheless, Vlemmix stated he would participate in the 2021 general election with a new party: The Party Party (De Feestpartij, DFP).
