= Henk Westbroek =

Dutch singer (born 1952)

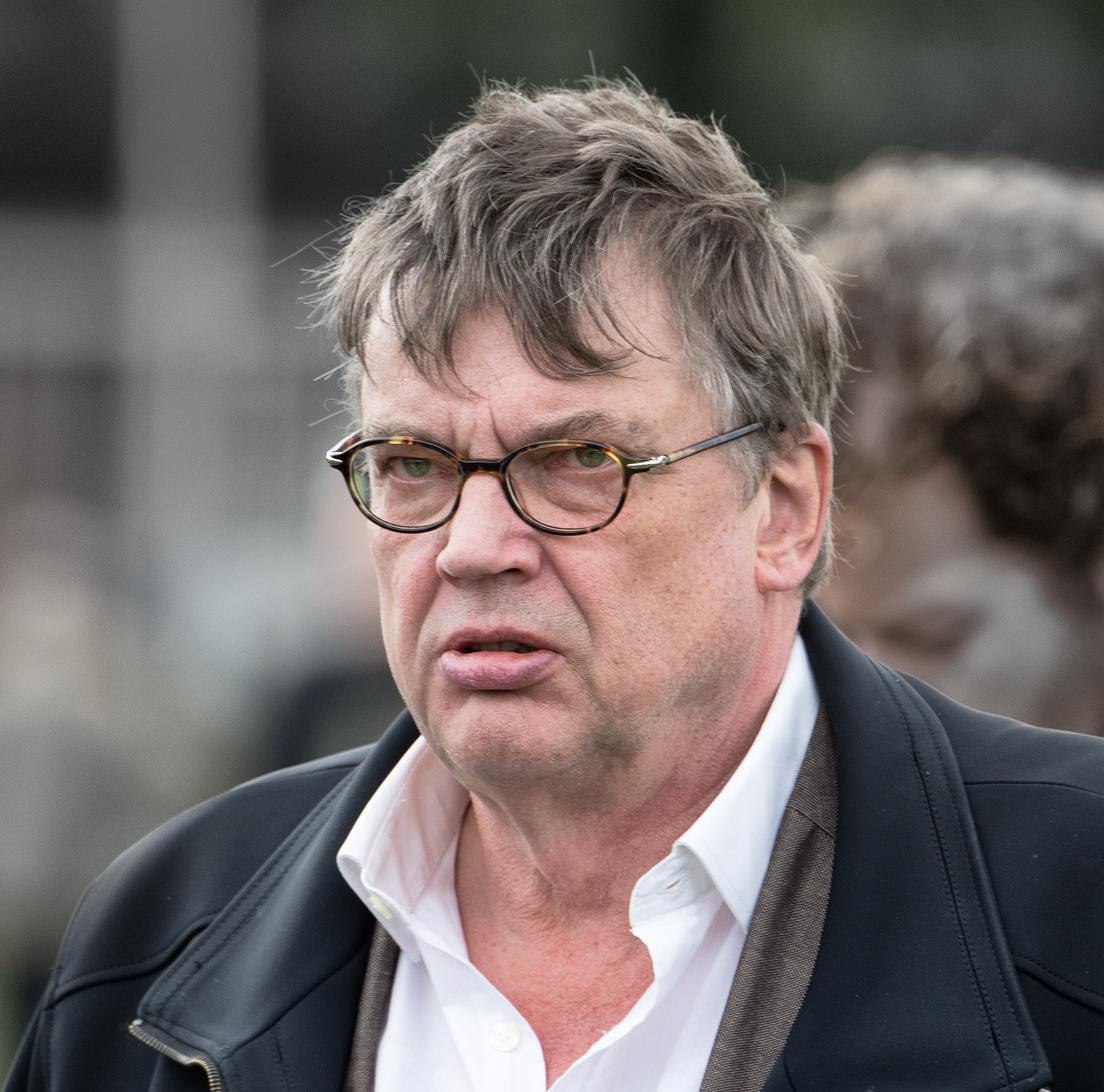
- Westbroek in 2013
- Born: Hendrik Otto Westbroek; February 27, 1952 (age 74); Zuilen, Utrecht, Netherlands
- Years active: 1979–present
- Known for: Het Goede Doel
- Political party: Livable Netherlands

Hendrik Otto "Henk" Westbroek (born 27 February 1952) is a Dutch musician, politician, radio host and entrepreneur.

From 1979 to 1991, Westbroek was a vocalist for the pop group Het Goede Doel, one of the most successful Dutch-language bands of the 1980s with hit songs such as "België (Is er leven op Pluto... ?)" and "Vriendschap". Following the band's end, he began a solo career and had another hit in 1998 with "Zelfs je naam is mooi". He was also an entrepreneur, owning cafés in Utrecht for multiple decades.

Starting in 1998, Westbroek became a politician for the parties Leefbaar Utrecht and Leefbaar Nederland. He left politics in 2002. He would also attempt a run for mayor of Utrecht in 2007.

== Early life ==
Westbroek was born in the former municipality of Zuilen. He was adopted and raised by his aunt Riet van Leur, who he believed to be his biological mother. Westbroek grew up in Drenthe. When he was 12, the family moved back to Utrecht. When Westbroek was 17, he learned that his "aunt" – Riet's sister Nel – was actually his biological mother, who had Westbroek out of wedlock and gave him up for adoption out of shame. He has never met his biological father, but said "according to the neighbours, it was the fishmonger." When Westbroek was 50, he learned that he had a half-brother, because his mother gave birth to a son with another father.

Westbroek described his adopted father as "a social democrat and a bit of a communist", who died from black lung disease because he was exposed to coal while working at the municipal electricity company.

When Westbroek was 17, he met his wife, an English woman named Julia Harris, while the two of them were on a school trip to Paris. She came to the Netherlands when she was 18 and lived there illegally for a years. They had a daughter in 1990. They married in 2002, as they promised each other to only have a wedding when they were both 50 years old.

He studied sociology at Utrecht University, completing his course in 1973.

== Music career ==
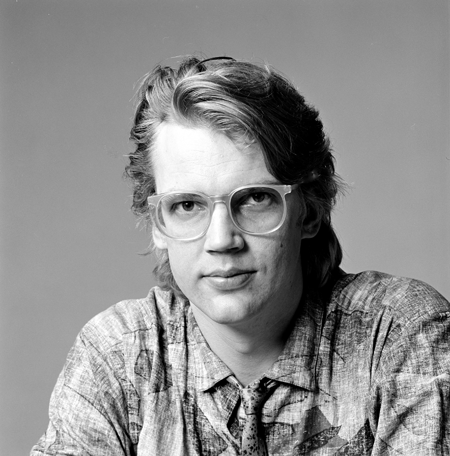
Henk Westbroek (1985)

In 1979, Westbroek, together with "the other Henk" (Henk Temming), formed the band Het Goede Doel (transl. The Charity, lit. 'The Good Cause'). He scored several top ten hits with Temming and Het Goede Doel became one of the most successful Dutch language bands of the 1980s. Their top-ten hit songs included "België (Is er leven op Pluto... ?)" and "Vriendschap".

In 1991, Het Goede Doel stopped performing. Westbroek said that "Henk and I split up at the time because we were bored with each other. Compare it to a broken marriage. That's how it goes when you're in a band. In the long run, we also got other interests."

They had a brief reunion in 2001 and reunited again in 2008, producing a new record, Gekkenwerk.

Since 1991, Henk Westbroek has been performing solo with his band "Henk Westbroek & Consorten". In 1998, he had a solo hit, "Zelfs je naam is mooi", which spent 42 weeks in the Dutch chart Mega Top 100.

== Radio career ==
In 1981 he started as a radio host. With Vara's Vuurwerk (Vara's Fireworks, with Vara being the name of the broadcoaster) he hosted the first programm with only hard rock music on Dutch public radio in the 80's. His show Denk aan Henk ("Think about Henk") on Dutch radio station 3FM ran four days a week from 1991 to 2003. He resumed the program, renamed Denk als Henk & Friends ("Think like Henk & Friends") at Yorin FM, from August 2004 to March 2006. Since 2006 he has a daily webradio show on KXRadio, an internet radio station founded by Rob Stenders.

== Politics ==
In the 1990s, he became active in Utrecht politics and was elected as a city council member for Leefbaar Utrecht, a local populist party. His inspiration began in 1997 when he felt frustration over the lack of participation regarding plans to renovate the area outside Utrecht Centraal station. In his biography, he recalled his thoughts being, "Let's start a local party, left of center. But the modern left, so not that fake left of the Labour Party. That's how Leefbaar Utrecht came into being."

For the municipal elections, Westbroek and his business partner Broos Schnetz funded the campaign themselves. The party won nine seats but was still the minority. In 2000, they won 14 seats and became the largest party in Utrecht.

In 1999, the local parties Leefbaar Utrecht and Leefbaar Hilversum combined to form a national party, Leefbaar Nederland (Livable Netherlands). Jan Nagel, leader of Leefbaar Hilversum, met Westbroek while they were both working at Omroepvereniging VARA. Pim Fortuyn became the party leader of LN in 2001 but was kicked out shortly afterwards for his remarks about immigration and Islam in a controversial interview with De Volkskrant. Westbroek immediately demanded that Fortuyn be suspended as LN member and party leader, declaring that "We find discrimination unacceptable, especially when it comes to an entire group." Fortuyn asked Westbroek if he wanted to be second-in-command in his new party, Pim Fortuyn List (LPF), but Westbroek declined.

A day after Fortuyn's assassination, a Moroccan man put a gun to Westbroek's head in Groningen, causing him to quit politics. He had a 12-year-old daughter at home and it was necessitated that he needed three bodyguards for protection.

In 2007, Westbroek attempted to run for mayor of Utrecht. However, in September, he received a letter from the Queen's Commissioner for Utrecht, stating that he is not among the candidates selected for interviews with the confidential committee. Westbroek claimed that his interview with the Commissioner resulted in him advancing to the next round and felt "suddenly dropped." There were questions about whether he could manage his busy life as a singer, radio host and manager of a well-known Utrecht café with the mayorship of his city.

== Businesses ==
In 1987, Westbroek, Rob Kok and their wives bought the café Willem Slok on the Korte Koestraat in Utrecht. Westbroek and Harris sold their share in the café in 1996. Westbroek's wife Julia helped come up with the paintings on the ceiling.

In 1994, Westbroek bought the Stairway to Heaven café on the Mariaplaats in Utrecht. It became a place where popular artists such as Alanis Morissette, Shania Twain and Golden Earring performed. It featured pieces of memorabilia that Westbroek owned, like an autographed guitar by Kurt Cobain. There was also an adjacent club opened, Club Stairway. In July 2020, Westbroek and his wife Julia Harris announced that they were retiring and would sell the cafe to their daughter Chrissie and her husband Dani Aguilera. It became a New Orleans-themed joint named NOLA. Then in 2024, NOLA announced it will also close.
