= Max Hermans =

Dutch politician

- In office 2003–2006

Personal details
- Born: 1974 (age 51–52) Geleen
- Party: Lijst Pim Fortuyn
- Occupation: Politician, public administrator

Max Hermans (born 1974) is a Dutch former politician who served as a member of the House of Representatives of the Netherlands for the Lijst Pim Fortuyn (LPF).

Hermans' father served as the People's Party for Freedom and Democracy Mayor of Hulsberg. He was elected to parliament in 2003 for the LPF and was a spokesman for the portfolio of Transport, Public Works and Water Management. He held this role until 2006 after which he retired from office.
