= Emile Ratelband =

Dutch entrepreneur and non-fiction writer

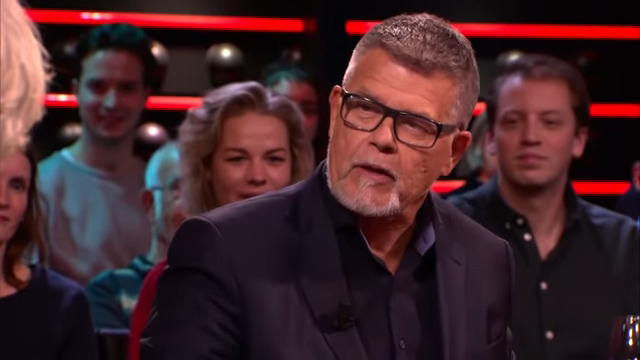
- Ratelband in 2018
- Born: 11 March 1949 (age 77); Arnhem, Netherlands
- Occupations: Former politician & television personality, motivational speaker
- Children: 9
- Website: http://www.ratelband.nl/?lang=en

Emile Albert Rudolf Ratelband (born 11 March 1949) is a Dutch television personality, "positivity guru" and former politician for Leefbaar Nederland.

== Biography ==
Emile Ratelband was born in Arnhem on 11 March 1949. He has eight children as of 2019.

In 2002, Ratelband started his own political party, Ratelband List (in Dutch, Lijst Ratelband), after being rejected as lijsttrekker for Leefbaar Nederland. Ratelband List took part in the elections for the Tweede Kamer on 22 January 2003, but failed to win a single seat.

In November 2018, Ratelband began a court case in Arnhem, seeking to have his date of birth legally changed from 11 March 1949 to 11 March 1969. Ratelband has said, "You can change your name. You can change your gender. Why not your age?" His attempt was rejected by the court on December 3, 2018.

== Controversy ==
Ratelband has attracted controversy with several of his public statements.

Ratelband has been criticised for making several statements sympathetic to Osama bin Laden. During a 2005 interview, Ratelband described Bin Laden as "an enlightened thinker", stating that the September 11 attacks were a part of Bin Laden's "divine plan". In 2011, Ratelband described Bin Laden as "a freedom fighter with clear principles". Ratelband also expressed his approval of Bin Laden's philosophy.

In 2009, Ratelband was accused of homophobia after describing homosexuality as "an illness" and gay people as "abnormal".

In 2020, Ratelband referred to politician Lodewijk Asscher, who is Jewish, as "that Jewish boy with the untrustworthy eyes". This statement was condemned as antisemitic by the CIDI.

In September 2022, Ratelband spoke out in support of the TV-program Ongehoord Nieuws after it aired a segment in which random videos were shown of people of color beating white people, which the hosts of the program framed as "the less known side of racism" and "something that is happening on a large scale". In the segment, an ethnic slur against black people is used multiple times. After the segment had been widely condemned, Ratelband defended the segment, stating that "blacks are more aggressive than white people" and that "we should punish them in the same way as their counterparts in Africa would".

=== Legal issues ===
After an attempt to set fire to Ratelband's house in March 2009, Ratelband was suspected of ordering this attempt, for a criminal trial was brought against him. Ratelband was alleged to have financial motives for the attempted arson. While the court stated there were strong indicators that Ratelband had ordered the attempt, it ruled that the evidence for a conviction was insufficient.

In 2015, Ratelband was convicted of assaulting his ex-wife in 2013. He was acquitted of threatening her. Ratelband's conviction was later upheld by higher courts.

In 2020, a European warrant for Ratelband's arrest was issued by the Netherlands after Ratelband took one of his sons to his home in Belgium. The child lived with his mother, whom Ratelband accused of abusing the child. A Belgian judge ordered Ratelband to report to the Dutch police for questioning. After returning the child to his mother, Ratelband was detained for several hours by the Dutch police.

In 2021, Ratelband was convicted of libel because of statements he made about one of his ex-wives. Ratelband appealed the verdict, which was upheld in 2022.
