= Livable Netherlands =

Livable Netherlands Leefbaar Nederland
- Leader: Pim Fortuyn (2001–2002); Fred Teeven (2002–2003); Haitske van der Linde (2003–2004); Fons Zinken (2004–2007)
- Chairman: Jan Nagel (1999–2004); Fons Zinken (2004–2007)
- Founded: 25 March 1999
- Dissolved: 10 September 2007
- Ideology: Populism; Nationalism; Republicanism
- Political position: Centre
- Colours: White; Orange

Livable Netherlands (Dutch: Leefbaar Nederland, LN) was a Dutch political party. Pim Fortuyn began his political career in the party.

== History ==
Historically there have always been parties in States Provincial (provincial legislatures) and municipal councils that were independent from the national party system. In the predominantly Catholic south of the Netherlands during the 1950s, the Catholic People's Party gained eighty percent of the vote in national elections, local and provincial groups of independents were organised.

During the 1980s, independent parties began to spread to other parts of the Netherlands. Some successful groups like Independent Rijswijk began to move towards a national movement. A congress for this purpose held in 1989 did not result in much progress towards this goal, although independent parties were still very successful in municipal elections especially in Hilversum and Utrecht.

Some of them chose the name Leefbaar ("liveable"). It became a distinct political movement. It was not a party in itself but consisted of many municipal branches. These branches had no formal ties, and often had radically different programs, sharing only their disdain for the political establishment.

In 1999, prominent media personalities Henk Westbroek and Jan Nagel, chairs of the highly successful Leefbaar Utrecht and Leefbaar Hilversum parties respectively, founded Leefbaar Nederland as a spin-off from their local parties. Nagel became the party's chair. Nagel had previously been chair of the VARA, a broadcaster linked to the Labour Party.

In 2001, the party's support and visibility began to increase. They came to be seen as an opposition movement against the second Kok cabinet. Nagel approached Pim Fortuyn to join the party. Fortuyn was a former sociology professor and business consultant who had risen to public prominence as a media figure, newspaper columnist and author who had announced his desire to stand for parliament in a 2001 interview, albeit without specifying which party he would seek his candidacy with. Although Fortuyn had considered running for the Christian Democratic Appeal, he decided to join Leefbaar Nederland. In November 2001 Fortuyn was elected as the party's lead candidate and LN saw rapid growth in opinion polls. On 10 February, a few months before the election, he was discharged as leader because of a controversial interview published in the Volkskrant newspaper concerning immigration and Islam. The LN board asked Fortuyn to retract his statements but Fortuyn refused. Fortuyn subsequently organised his own party, the Pim Fortuyn List, taking several former LN parliamentary candidates and members with him. On 10 March the Amsterdam public prosecutor Fred Teeven was chosen as new lead candidate. In the election of May 2002, the party won only two seats in the House of Representatives while the Pim Fortuyn List polled in second place with 26 seats.

In the election of 2003, self-help guru Emile Ratelband was put forward by the party board as their candidate for the lead candidate position. Teeven, who had gained some recognition as MP, withdrew his candidacy for the position when a motion of no confidence was not supported by the party's congress. During a tumultuous congress, the 22-year-old Haitske van der Linde, the daughter of TV personality Wibo van der Linde and candidate of the party's youth movement J@L, was elected lead candidate. She was unable to hold on to the two seats the party held, and the party left parliament. Ratelband, who had formed his own list, was still less successful in the polls. The party tried to dissolve itself, but there were not enough members present at the congress to do that, and the party left the public spotlight. In 2006, the party announced that it would disband itself: it owed a large debt to the Ministry of the Interior, who had lent them money for the 2003 election, and only a handful of paying members were left.

== Name ==
The term "Leefbaar" was turned into a political brand by the Leefbaar Utrecht and Hilversum parties; the founders tried to reproduce this success by taking over the name.

== Ideology and issues ==
The party was a populist party, oriented towards democratising society and solving several difficult political issues pragmatically. The party saw itself as a movement against the 'old parties' and especially those cooperating in the second Kok cabinet and sought not to characterize itself on the traditional left-right political spectrum. The core principles of the party included direct democracy, reliable government, downsizing state bureaucracy and law & order policies.

They had a ten-point plan which included:

- implementing referendums
- combatting bureaucracy
- strengthening the citizen's say over their own life.
- a just asylum seeker policy

== Representation ==
=== House of Representatives ===
Election	Lead candidate	List	Votes	%	Seats	+/–	Government	Ref.
2002	Fred Teeven	List	153,055	1.6	2 / 150		in opposition	
2003	Haitske van der Linde	List	38,894	0.4	0 / 150	▼2	extra-parliamentary	

The party were unable to ever obtain any European Parliament or Senate seats. Their support came mostly from independent voters, who no longer felt connected to a particular party.

=== Municipal and Provincial Government ===
The municipal and local Leefbaar parties were not an official part of the party. Some of these parties, most notably Livable Rotterdam were however founded around the same time hoping to gain from the same momentum. Many of these parties are represented in provincial and municipal councils and cooperated in several municipal executives. They were highly successful in the 2002 municipal elections, but lost much of their support in the 2006 municipal elections.

== Organisation ==
=== Organisational structure ===
The highest organ of LN was the Congress in which every member could participate. It convened once every year. It appointed the party board and decided the order of the House of Representatives, Senate and European Parliament candidate lists and had the final say over the party program.

=== Linked organisations ===
The party's youth organisation was called Jong@Leefbaar.nl (Young@Livable.nl; J@L). The party published De Leefbaar Koerier (Livable Courier). The scientific institute of the party was called Foundation Scientific Bureau Livable Netherlands, which published De Fundering (The Foundation).

== International comparison ==
Internationally, Leefbaar Nederland may be compared to Forza Italia, a populist party centered on a prominent media personality.
