= 2002 Dutch municipal reorganization elections =

- 20 November 2002; 6 November 2002 (Echt-Susteren)
- 158 of 9889 municipal seats Seat tallies below only reflect affected municipalities
- Turnout: 59.30% (▲2.56pp)
Party	Vote %	Seats	+/–
Local parties	24.95	39	−22
CDA	23.70	42	−9
PvdA	13.25	24	−12
SP	11.40	15	+2
VVD	9.17	13	−17
Joint lists	4.58	9	−3
GL	3.86	5	0
LPF	3.28	4	New
D66	2.52	3	−8
CU	1.42	2	0
SGP	1.11	2	0
This lists parties that won seats. See the complete results below.
- CDA won plurality
- SP won plurality
- CDA won plurality, local parties won plurality if grouped together

Municipal reorganization elections were held in the Netherlands in November 2002. They were controversially seen as a bellwether for the 2003 Dutch general election.

Over the course of April to June 2002, the Dutch government approved six new municipal mergers, which would take effect on 1 January 2003. This led to new elections in November 2002 across six reorganized municipalities: Oss (largest), Terneuzen, Zwijndrecht, Echt-Susteren, Hulst and Sluis (smallest). Half of these prospective municipalities were located in Zeeland; the others were located in Limburg (Echt-Susteren), South Holland (Zwijndrecht) and North Brabant (Oss). In the municipal elections of 1998, the Christian Democratic Appeal (CDA) won pluralities in 3 of these areas, while trailing the Socialist Party (SP) in Oss, the Labour Party (PvdA) in Zwijndrecht, and a local party in Sluis. Furthermore, if local parties are treated as a bloc, they outpolled the CDA in Echt-Susteren and Hulst, where they won outright majorities. Across these areas, the CDA was the strongest national contender, garnering 28'234 votes (22.2%). The CDA was followed by the Labour Party (PvdA), which received 15.4% of the vote.

In October 2002, internal strife within the Pim Fortuyn List (LPF) led to the collapse of the first Balkenende cabinet, triggering a snap election in January 2003. As a result, the municipal reorganization elections held the following month were treated as a tentative indicator of national trends, despite covering only newly merged municipalities. Analysts debated their relevance, with some arguing the elections reflected broader sentiment while others highlighted the distortions introduced by local grievances and the unique context of annexations. The SP was projected to strengthen its position in Oss, while the CDA was expected to perform well. Far-right activity surfaced in Zwijndrecht and Oss, though ultimately failed to gain traction. National party leaders, including the CDA's Jan Peter Balkenende, PvdA’s Wouter Bos, VVD's Gerrit Zalm, SP's Jan Marijnissen, and GroenLinks’ Paul Rosenmöller actively campaigned in the affected areas. On 6 November, Echt-Susteren became the election cycle's first municipality to vote; the rest followed on the 20th.

The CDA emerged as the overall winner, collecting 28,554 votes (23.7%) and leading in five of six new municipalities, with its strongest performance in Zwijndrecht. The SP dominated in Oss with 38.4% but did not achieve an outright majority. The PvdA came second overall with 15,963 votes (13.2%) but suffered a notable decline, particularly in Zwijndrecht where it lost its plurality. Local parties, although fragmented, performed well collectively, especially in Echt-Susteren and Hulst, where they collectively exceeded 50% of the vote. The far-right New National Party contested only Zwijndrecht and failed to win a seat. Analysts cautioned against drawing national conclusions from partisan results, citing local dynamics and the distorting effects of recent mergers, though the high turnout was attributed to the cabinet collapse. In Oss, 17-year-old Lilian Marijnissen—future leader of the SP—won a seat via preference votes, joining the municipal council in September 2003 after reaching the age of eligibility.

== Background ==
=== Legislative ===
The previous municipal reorganization elections were held in November 2001, and regular municipal elections followed in March 2002. Over the course of April to June 2002, the government approved a number of new municipal mergers, which would take effect on 1 January 2003:

- The municipalities of Heerjansdam and Zwijndrecht: merged into the new municipality of Zwijndrecht. (18 April 2002)
- The municipalities of Oss and Ravenstein: merged into the new municipality of Oss. (18 April 2002)
- The municipalities of Hontenisse and Hulst: merged into the new municipality of Hulst. (16 May 2002)
- The municipalities of Oostburg and Sluis-Aardenburg: merged into the new municipality of Sluis. (16 May 2002)
- The municipalities of Axel, Sas van Gent, and Terneuzen: merged into the new municipality of Terneuzen. (16 May 2002)
- The municipalities of Echt and Susteren: merged into the new municipality of Echt-Susteren. (20 June 2002)

This precipitated municipal reorganization elections for November 2002.

=== Political geography / prior results ===
In the south-eastern Netherlands, the predecessors of Limburg’s municipality of Echt-Susteren (Echt and Susteren) cast 18,461 valid votes in 1998, and more than half of them—58.9%, or 10,860 ballots—went to local parties, giving those non-national actors a majority. Christian Democratic Appeal (CDA) followed distantly with 3,965 votes (21.5%). Labour (PvdA) collected 1,163 votes, slightly ahead of GroenLinks at 1,065, while Democrats 66 (D66) drew 863 ballots and the People’s Party for Freedom and Democracy (VVD) secured only 545. In the neighbouring province of North Brabant, Oss—together with the later absorbed municipality of Ravenstein—counted 34,802 votes. In that locality, the SP commanded first place with 11,045 ballots (31.8%) and CDA held second on 22.5%, while local parties captured 19.4% of the vote overall. Oss is further notable as the birth place of Jan Marijnissen, who served as the SP's lead candidate in the 1998 and 2002 general elections, a role he would reprise in 2003.

At the southwestern edge of the coastal province of Zeeland, the predecessors of the municipality of Sluis (Oostburg and Sluis-Aardenburg) recorded 12,129 votes in 1998. Local parties led with 3,467 votes, comprising 28.6% of the total, followed by the PvdA with 2,667 votes (22.0%) and CDA close behind on 2,460 votes (20.3%). The VVD garnered 1,513 ballots, accounting for 12.5%, while joint lists received 1,401 votes (11.6%), and D66 drew 621 votes (5.1%). Moving east to the province's largest city—Terneuzen and its future fusees (Axel and Sas van Gent)—the 25,376 valid votes were more evenly distributed. The VVD followed on 4 184 (16.5%), local parties on 3 986 (15.7%) and D66 on 1 562 (6.2%). Joint lists attracted 1 327 ballots (5.2%), while GroenLinks, the Reformed Political Party (SGP) and the Reformed Political League (GPV) hovered at 3-4%. Further inland in Hulst (and its future fusee Hontenisse), 15,503 ballots were cast. Local parties dominated with 7,890 votes (50.9%), with CDA second at 3,691 (23.8%), PvdA third at 2,052 (13.2%), and VVD receiving 1,579 (10.2%). D66 trailed with 291 votes, or 1.9%.

North of Zeeland, future fusees Heerjansdam and Zwijndrecht of South Holland produced 20,809 votes. Labour secured a narrow plurality, drawing 4,846 ballots (23.3%), with VVD at 22.7% and CDA close behind at 21.9%. Joint lists took 13.7%, D66 9.6%, GroenLinks obtained 6.7%, and the far-right People's Nationalists Netherlands (VNN) received 2.1%. Taken together, the six reorganising territories yielded 127 080 votes. Local parties form the largest bloc with 32 937 ballots, or 25.9%. CDA follows with 22.2%; PvdA and VVD command 15.4% and 13.3% respectively. The SP’s 11 045 ballots correspond to 8.7%, D66 adds 5.4%, joint lists 4.4% and GroenLinks 2.8%, while SGP, GPV and VNN each finished below one percent.

Results of the 1998 municipal elections in the areas later merged
Municipalities (1998 → 2003)	Local parties	CDA	PvdA	VVD	SP	D66	Joint lists	GL	SGP	GPV	VNN
Echt; Susteren; Merged into: Echt-Susteren	17 seats (10 860 votes)	6 (3 965)	1 (1 163)	1 (545)	–	1 (863)	–	2 (1 065)	–	–	–
Heerjansdam; Zwijndrecht; Merged into: Zwijndrecht	–	8 (4 562)	9 (4 846)	9 (4 723)	–	5 (1 998)	5 (2 853)	2 (1 394)	–	–	0 (433)
Oss; Ravenstein; Merged into: Oss	11 (6 734)	11 (7 838)	5 (3 212)	5 (4 419)	13 (11 045)	1 (1 554)	–	–	–	–	–
Hontenisse; Hulst; Merged into: Hulst	17 (7 890)	7 (3 691)	3 (2 052)	3 (1 579)	–	0 (291)	–	–	–	–	–
Oostburg; Sluis-Aardenburg; Merged into: Sluis	8 (3 467)	7 (2 460)	6 (2 667)	3 (1 513)	–	1 (621)	5 (1 401)	–	–	–	–
Axel; Sas van Gent; Terneuzen; Merged into: Terneuzen	8 (3 986)	12 (5 718)	12 (5 574)	9 (4 184)	–	3 (1 562)	2 (1 327)	1 (1 134)	2 (1 123)	2 (768)	–
Total	61 (32 937)	51 (28 234)	36 (19 514)	30 (16 963)	13 (11 045)	11 (6 889)	12 (5 581)	5 (3 593)	2 (1 123)	2 (816)	0 (433)

=== Cabinet disintegration ===
Mounting strife within the Pim Fortuyn List (LPF) placed the first Balkenende cabinet under acute strain in October 2002. Two rival camps crystallised: Eduard Bomhoff aligned with interim party chair Ed Maas, whereas Herman Heinsbroek backed parliamentary leader Harry Wijnschenk. On 4 October Jan Balkenende still dismissed questions about LPF discord. During an assembly on 5 October, Heinsbroek was the only minister to publicly support Weinschenk, while Bomhoff was publicly neutral. Heinsbroek denounced Bomhoff's neutral speech as a lulverhaal ("bullshit"), and the pair clashed again when Bomhoff urged revisions to Central Planning Bureau models, to which Heinsbroek objected. Viewing their feud as a threat to government viability, Balkenende warned at the 11 October cabinet meeting that the squabbling must cease; VVD leader Gerrit Zalm echoed the concern on 13 October, saying a cabinet could not function with two ministers "who can’t stand the sight of each other."

On 13 October LPF ministers convened and, by majority, demanded Bomhoff’s resignation; ministers Khee Liang Phoa and Cees van Leeuwen dissented. After Prince Claus’s funeral on 15 October, LPF ministers withdrew confidence in both Bomhoff and Heinsbroek, yet they refused to step aside, each insisting the parliamentary caucus should decide. Balkenende suspended that evening's cabinet session, warning he would govern only if the LPF united behind its leader and both ministers resigned voluntarily. The next morning, before talks resumed, Zalm and CDA parliamentary leader Maxime Verhagen declared their trust in the coalition exhausted. Bomhoff and Heinsbroek agreed to quit, but the decision was moot: Balkenende informed Parliament that his cabinet had lost its basis and tendered his resignation to the Queen. Bomhoff’s later memoir, Blinde Ambitie (published 19 December 2002), quoting confidential cabinet deliberations, prompted an inquiry into possible breach of official secrecy.

Immediately after the collapse, Balkenende and Verhagen signalled readiness to continue with the VVD but not the LPF, noting polls that hinted at a joint majority of 77 to 79 seats. LPF ministers petitioned Queen Beatrix on 21 October for a "glueing attempt," even offering to cede a portfolio, yet CDA and VVD dismissed the overture as "a passed station." Following consultations with her constitutional advisers and parliamentary leaders—none but the LPF favoured salvaging the coalition—the Queen accepted the resignation. Balkende set 22 January 2003 for new elections, allowing time for new parties to register by 28 October. Balkenende explained the date as the earliest practicable moment satisfying the House’s wish for rapid elections. In the intervening caretaker period the portfolios of the departed LPF ministers were reassigned to CDA and VVD colleagues—Aart Jan de Geus took Health and the deputy premiership from Bomhoff, while Hans Hoogervorst assumed Economic Affairs from Heinsbroek.

== Campaign ==
=== Bellwhether and forecasts ===
In light of the cabinet collapse, the November 2002 municipal elections came to be seen as a "cautious bellwether" for the upcoming snap election. While the results would only reflect outcomes in a limited number of newly reorganized municipalities, political figures and analysts still scrutinized them for signs of shifting allegiances. Campaigners such as CDA strategist Ries Smits argued the results would express national trends, despite regional variation. Others, including SP campaign manager Tiny Kox, downplayed any broader significance, portraying local elections as inherently site-specific. Political scientist Cees van der Eijk warned that any interpretation would be inconclusive, especially given the unique character of merger-driven votes and their frequent emphasis on local identity and resentment.

Some observers focused on the electoral peculiarities introduced by municipal mergers themselves. Analyst Marcel Boogers emphasized how annexation could provoke backlash, especially in smaller communities with strong local identities. This dynamic, he argued, sometimes leads to spikes in turnout or support for newly founded local parties, such as Rosmalens Belang after Rosmalen’s incorporation into Den Bosch. In 2002, the mergers appeared to lack that same level of intensity, but concerns lingered. In Heerjansdam, for example, fears of diminished autonomy prompted a last-minute move to establish a village council parallel to the new Zwijndrecht municipal government. These localized responses complicated the interpretation of results, raising questions about whether changes in party performance truly reflected national momentum or merely municipal discontent.

Nevertheless, concrete expectations were circulated in the run-up to the vote. The SP, already holding a plurality in Oss, was projected to win an outright majority—though Marcel Boogers speculated the recent annexation of Ravenstein might dampen its total due to weaker support there. The CDA, meanwhile, was forecast to secure pluralities in Hulst, Sluis, and Terneuzen, but not in Zwijndrecht. Furthermore, the SGP was expected to suffer a seat loss in Terneuzen.

=== Echt-Susteren ===
Echt-Susteren (fused from Echt and Susteren) was the first municipality to vote in this election cycle. Whereas the other provinces held elections on 20 November, Limburg's new municipality cast its vote on the 6th. However, because this particular municipal election mostly concerned local parties, it was not considered to be of national significance. Accordingly, while the CDA attained a plurality with 4019 votes (22.7%)—262 more than the local Lijst Samenwerking (Cooperation List)—local parties still collectively garnered 56.5% of the vote.

=== Far-right involvement ===
In Zwijndrecht, the far-right New National Party (NNP) attempted to rebrand itself under the more electorally appealing name “Leefbaar Zwijndrecht.” The name was registered just one week after the electoral breakthrough of Leefbaar Rotterdam under Pim Fortuyn. Although framed as a local initiative, the new association was dominated by established NNP figures, with two of its three founding board members already serving within the NNP leadership. Their dual intent was to shield the “Leefbaar” brand from rival claimants while leveraging its populist appeal to attract votes. Ultimately, internal opposition to this rebranding led the party to contest the election solely under the NNP label.

The party's leading figures in Zwijndrecht included national NNP treasurer Bert Heidekamp and Janny Bom-Jurgens, both veterans of the Dutch far-right scene. Bom-Jurgens, despite her past affiliations with the Centre Party, Centre Democrats, VNN, and the NNP, publicly claimed only to have been a member of the VVD. Her short-lived role as chairwoman of Leefbaar Zwijndrecht ended in the summer of 2002 when she declined to continue the initiative. Following this rift, both she and Heidekamp resigned from the board, and the rebranded project failed to coalesce.

In Oss, far-right activity manifested in a separate but equally controversial attempt to participate in the elections under the LPF banner. A former Centre Democrats candidate registered an “LPF/Fortuynlijk Oss” chapter. The LPF, while initially aware of the candidate's CD background, claimed ignorance of his alleged criminal record and swiftly expelled him from the local chapter, although he remained a nominal party member. The candidate threatened to run independently under the name Lokaal 2002 Oss, but ultimately failed to submit a valid candidate list. Among those aiding his short-lived effort was Bart van Amelsfort, a former member of CP’86 and the militant Aktionfront Nationale Socialisten.

=== Campaigning by national party leaders ===
Unlike the election of 6 November in Echt-Susteren—downplayed at the national level due to the dominance of local parties—the municipal reorganization elections of 20 November 2002 in Oss, Hulst, Terneuzen, Sluis and especially Zwijndrecht were considered more nationally significant. These contests featured significant involvement by national political parties and attracted substantial attention from party leaders ahead of the snap general election scheduled for January 2003. The presence of familiar political brands and the participation of high-profile figures added symbolic weight to the results, especially as national leaders attempted to reinforce their visibility in areas undergoing administrative change. In this context, the elections were treated as an early test of national party strength under volatile conditions.

VVD leader Gerrit Zalm appeared in Oss on 12 November. During his visit, Zalm addressed Turkish immigrants whom he addressed at a local mosque. His campaigning style drew mixed reviews; critics occasionally faulted him for an overly dour demeanour and a perceived lack of personal warmth. Zalm acknowledged some of these concerns in a personal weblog, an innovative campaign feature at the time. Other national leaders, including CDA's Jan Peter Balkenende, PvdA’s Wouter Bos, and GroenLinks’ Paul Rosenmöller, also made appearances in the relevant municipalities. In Oss, Socialist Party leader Jan Marijnissen, a resident of the city, took on a particularly active role, leveraging local visibility to support the SP’s anticipated gains.

== Results ==
The CDA was considered the winner of this election cycle.

=== Nationwide vote ===
As of 1 January 2003, there were a total of 9889 municipal seats across the Netherlands. Seat changes in the table below only reflect the relevant municipalities.

Party	Votes	%	Seats	+/–
Local parties	30,071	24.95	39	−22
Christian Democratic Appeal	28,554	23.70	42	−9
Labour Party	15,963	13.25	24	−12
Socialist Party	13,739	11.40	15	+2
VVD	11,055	9.17	13	−17
Joint lists	5,517	4.58	9	−3
GroenLinks	4,650	3.86	5	0
Pim Fortuyn List	3,952	3.28	4	New
Democrats 66	3,032	2.52	3	−8
Christian Union	1,711	1.42	2	0
Reformed Political Party	1,338	1.11	2	0
Durable Netherlands	603	0.50	0	New
New National Party (Netherlands)	316	0.26	0	New
Total	120,501	100.00	158	−88
Valid votes	120,501	99.92		
Invalid/blank votes	92	0.08		
Total votes	120,593	100.00		
Registered voters/turnout	203,371	59.30		

=== Results by municipality ===
With 28'554 votes (23.7% of all valid ballots) the CDA emerged ahead overall and won pluralities in five of the six newly constituted councils, conceding first place only in Oss, where the SP surged (38.40%, +6.7pp) but came short of a majority. The CDA’s largest raw haul also came from that city—6'944 ballots—yet the 19.9% share there was 2.6pp lower than in 1998 and trailed the SP total. The party’s strongest proportional result stood in Zwijndrecht: 4'858 votes supplied 27.1% and a gain of 5.3pp. Comparable outcomes were achieved in Terneuzen (26.9%, +4.4pp), Hulst (25.0%, +1.2pp), Sluis (23.0%, +2.7pp) and Echt-Susteren (22.7%, +1.2pp), each figure enough to top the local tables. The most pronounced upward swing therefore belonged to Zwijndrecht, the mildest to Hulst, while Oss supplied the only contraction. Across the six authorities the CDA captured 42 of 158 seats and lifted its combined vote share by 1.5pp relative to 1998.

The Labour Party collected 15'963 votes, equal to a 13.2% share and the second-largest total nationwide, yet its 3'246 ballots in Zwijndrecht (18.1%) were insufficient to retain that municipality’s plurality. Its broadest foothold lay in Terneuzen, where 5'388 votes corresponded to 23.0% of the local poll—an increase of 1.0pp over 1998. Notable though smaller results were logged in Sluis (2'099 votes; 17.5%, –4.5pp), Hulst (1'839; 12.6%, –0.7pp) and Oss (2'412; 6.9%, –2.3pp). Echt-Susteren provided the slimmest showing: 979 ballots translated into 5.5%, a dip of 0.8pp in spite of high turnout. Across the six councils the party secured 24 of 158 seats, while its combined vote share receded by about 2.1pp compared with 1998. The sharpest local decline—5.1pp—occurred in Zwijndrecht, whereas the sole advance was the 1.0-point uptick in Terneuzen.

Local parties collectively amassed 30'071 ballots, representing 24.9% of all valid votes and yielding 39 seats. Although no local party became the largest of any municipality in its own right, they collectively reached pluralities in three: Echt-Susteren registered 10'005 votes (56.5%), Hulst 7'600 (51.9%) and Sluis 3 919 (32.7%), the last figure reflecting the bloc’s sharpest advance at +4.1pp over 1998. More restrained returns appeared in Oss, where 5'137 votes equated to 14.8% and a fall of 4.6pp, and in Terneuzen, where 3'410 ballots produced 14.6%, a slide of 1.1pp. In aggregate their support slipped 0.9pp relative to the previous cycle. The far-right New National Party (NNP), formerly the VNN, contested only Zwijndrecht and secured 316 votes (1.8%), insufficient for a single council seat.

Municipality	Eligible	Turn-out	Local parties	CDA	PvdA	SP	VVD	Joint lists	GL	LPF	D66	CU	SGP	DN	NNP
Echt-Susteren	25 309	70.1%	13 seats (10 005 votes)	6 (4 019)	1 (979)	0 (357)	1 (740)	1 (705)	1 (916)	–	–	–	–	–	–
Zwijndrecht	34 981	51.2%	–	8 (4 858)	6 (3 246)	–	4 (2 603)	4 (2 413)	2 (1 156)	3 (1 857)	2 (1 446)	–	–	–	0 (316)
Oss	58 305	59.8%	5 (5 137)	8 (6 944)	2 (2 412)	15 (13 382)	4 (4 289)	–	1 (865)	0 (521)	0 (695)	–	–	0 (603)	–
Hulst	21 965	66.6%	11 (7 600)	6 (3 662)	3 (1 839)	–	1 (1 101)	–	0 (212)	0 (220)	–	–	–	–	–
Sluis	19 640	61.1%	6 (3 919)	5 (2 758)	4 (2 099)	–	–	4 (2 399)	0 (516)	0 (293)	–	–	–	–	–
Terneuzen	43 171	54.3%	4 (3 410)	9 (6 313)	8 (5 388)	–	3 (2 322)	–	1 (985)	1 (1 061)	1 (891)	2 (1 711)	2 (1 338)	–	–
Total	203 371	59.3%	39 (30 071)	42 (28 554)	24 (15 963)	15 (13 739)	13 (11 055)	9 (5 517)	5 (4 650)	4 (3 952)	3 (3 032)	2 (1 711)	2 (1 338)	0 (603)	0 (316)

==== Echt-Susteren (6 November, Limburg) ====
Municipality	1998 result	1998 result (combined)	2002 result
Susteren	CDA (2009 votes, 3 seats); DS (1833 votes, 3 seats); AB (1696 votes, 2 seats); PGS ’90 (1271 votes, 2 seats); D66 (863 votes, 1 seat); PvdA (528 votes, 0 seats); Total: 8200 votes, 11 seats	CDA (3965 votes, 6 seats); LS (3865 votes, 7 seats); DS (1833 votes, 3 seats); AB (1696 votes, 2 seats); PGS ’90 (1271 votes, 2 seats); PvdA (1163 votes, 1 seat); GL (1065 votes, 2 seats); LM (993 votes, 1 seat); D66 (863 votes, 1 seat); KB (679 votes, 1 seat); VVD (545 votes, 1 seat); DPB (523 votes, 1 seat); Total: 18 461 votes, 28 seats	Merged into: Echt-Susteren: CDA (4019 votes, 6 seats,); LS (3757 votes, 5 seats, ▼2); AB (2758 votes, 4 seats, ▲2); DES (1321 votes, 2 seats, ▼1); KB (990 votes, 1 seat,); PvdA (979 votes, 1 seat,); GL (916 votes, 1 seat, ▼1); LM (860 votes, 1 seat,); VVD (740 votes, 1 seat,); D66 (705 votes, 1 seat,); SP (357 votes, 0 seats, (New)); DPB (319 votes, 0 seats, ▼1); Total: 17 721 votes, 23 seats, ▼5
Echt	LS (3865 votes, 7 seats); CDA (1956 votes, 3 seats); GL (1065 votes, 2 seats); LM (993 votes, 1 seat); KB (679 votes, 1 seat); PvdA (635 votes, 1 seat); VVD (545 votes, 1 seat); DPB (523 votes, 1 seat); Total: 10 855 votes, 17 seats	CDA (3965 votes, 6 seats); LS (3865 votes, 7 seats); DS (1833 votes, 3 seats); AB (1696 votes, 2 seats); PGS ’90 (1271 votes, 2 seats); PvdA (1163 votes, 1 seat); GL (1065 votes, 2 seats); LM (993 votes, 1 seat); D66 (863 votes, 1 seat); KB (679 votes, 1 seat); VVD (545 votes, 1 seat); DPB (523 votes, 1 seat); Total: 18 461 votes, 28 seats	Merged into: Echt-Susteren: CDA (4019 votes, 6 seats,); LS (3757 votes, 5 seats, ▼2); AB (2758 votes, 4 seats, ▲2); DES (1321 votes, 2 seats, ▼1); KB (990 votes, 1 seat,); PvdA (979 votes, 1 seat,); GL (916 votes, 1 seat, ▼1); LM (860 votes, 1 seat,); VVD (740 votes, 1 seat,); D66 (705 votes, 1 seat,); SP (357 votes, 0 seats, (New)); DPB (319 votes, 0 seats, ▼1); Total: 17 721 votes, 23 seats, ▼5

==== Zwijndrecht (South Holland, 20 November) ====
Municipality	1998 result	1998 result (combined)	2002 result
Heerjansdam	D66 (486 votes, 3 seats); VVD (430 votes, 3 seats); PvdA (426 votes, 2 seats); CDA (407 votes, 2 seats); SGP/RPF (155 votes, 1 seat); Total: 1904 votes, 11 seats	PvdA (4846 votes, 9 seats); VVD (4723 votes, 9 seats); CDA (4562 votes, 8 seats); SGP/GPV/RPF (2853 votes, 5 seats); Democrats 66 (1998 votes, 5 seats); GL (1394 votes, 2 seats); VNN (433 votes, 0 seats); Total: 20'809 votes, 38 seats	Merged into: Zwijndrecht: CDA (4858 votes, 8 seats,); PvdA (3246 votes, 6 seats, ▼3); VVD (2603 votes, 4 seats, ▼5); CU–SGP (2413 votes, 4 seats, ▼1); LPF (1857 votes, 3 seats, (New)); GL (1156 votes, 2 seats,); NPP (316 votes, 0 seats,); Total: 17'895 votes, 29 seats, ▼9
Zwijndrecht	PvdA (4420 votes, 7 seats); VVD (4293 votes, 6 seats); CDA (4155 votes, 6 seats); SGP/GPV/RPF (2698 votes, 4 seats); Democrats 66 (1512 votes, 2 seats); GL (1394 votes, 2 seats); VNN (433 votes, 0 seats); Total: 18'905 votes, 27 seats	PvdA (4846 votes, 9 seats); VVD (4723 votes, 9 seats); CDA (4562 votes, 8 seats); SGP/GPV/RPF (2853 votes, 5 seats); Democrats 66 (1998 votes, 5 seats); GL (1394 votes, 2 seats); VNN (433 votes, 0 seats); Total: 20'809 votes, 38 seats	Merged into: Zwijndrecht: CDA (4858 votes, 8 seats,); PvdA (3246 votes, 6 seats, ▼3); VVD (2603 votes, 4 seats, ▼5); CU–SGP (2413 votes, 4 seats, ▼1); LPF (1857 votes, 3 seats, (New)); GL (1156 votes, 2 seats,); NPP (316 votes, 0 seats,); Total: 17'895 votes, 29 seats, ▼9

==== Oss (North Brabant, 20 November) ====
Municipality	1998 result	1998 result (combined)	2002 result
Ravenstein	H'77 (1391 votes, 4 seats); CDA (1125 votes, 3 seats); DB (800 votes, 2 seats); POR (777 votes, 2 seats); PvdA (479 votes, 2 seats); VVD (235 votes, 0 seats); Total: 4807 votes, 13 seats	SP (11 045 votes, 13 seats); CDA (7838 votes, 11 seats); VVD (4419 votes, 5 seats); PvdA (3212 votes, 5 seats); VdG (3198 votes, 3 seats); D66 (1554 votes, 1 seat); H'77 (1391 votes, 4 seats); DB (800 votes, 2 seats); POR (777 votes, 2 seats); PMB (568 votes, 0 seats); Total: 34 802 votes, 46 seats	Merged into: Oss: SP (13 382 votes, 15 seats, ▲2); CDA (6944 votes, 8 seats, ▼3); VdG (4706 votes, 5 seats, ▲2); VVD (4289 votes, 4 seats, ▼1); PvdA (2412 votes, 2 seats, ▼3); GL (865 votes, 1 seat, (New)); D66 (695 votes, 0 seats, ▼1); PMB (320 votes, 0 seats,); Total: 34 848 votes, 35 seats, ▼11
Oss	SP (11 045 votes, 13 seats); CDA (6713 votes, 8 seats); VVD (4184 votes, 5 seats); VdG (3198 votes, 3 seats); PvdA (2733 votes, 3 seats); D66 (1554 votes, 1 seat); PMB (568 votes, 0 seats); Total: 29 995 votes, 33 seats	SP (11 045 votes, 13 seats); CDA (7838 votes, 11 seats); VVD (4419 votes, 5 seats); PvdA (3212 votes, 5 seats); VdG (3198 votes, 3 seats); D66 (1554 votes, 1 seat); H'77 (1391 votes, 4 seats); DB (800 votes, 2 seats); POR (777 votes, 2 seats); PMB (568 votes, 0 seats); Total: 34 802 votes, 46 seats	Merged into: Oss: SP (13 382 votes, 15 seats, ▲2); CDA (6944 votes, 8 seats, ▼3); VdG (4706 votes, 5 seats, ▲2); VVD (4289 votes, 4 seats, ▼1); PvdA (2412 votes, 2 seats, ▼3); GL (865 votes, 1 seat, (New)); D66 (695 votes, 0 seats, ▼1); PMB (320 votes, 0 seats,); Total: 34 848 votes, 35 seats, ▼11

==== Hulst (Zeeland, 20 November) ====
Municipality	1998 result	1998 result (combined)	2002 result
Hontenisse	AB (1559 votes, 4 seats); GH (1289 votes, 4 seats); CDA (1265 votes, 3 seats); PrHon (884 votes, 2 seats); Total: 4997 votes, 13 seats	CDA (3691 votes, 7 seats); GH/GB (2693 votes, 4 seats); PvdA (2052 votes, 3 seats); VVD (1579 votes, 3 seats); AB (1559 votes, 4 seats); PrHul (1465 votes, 3 seats); GH (1289 votes, 4 seats); PrHon (884 votes, 2 seats); D66 (291 votes, 0 seats); Total: 15 503 votes, 30 seats	Merged into: Hulst: CDA (3662 votes, 6 seats, ▼1); GH/GB (2555 votes, 4 seats,); PvdA (1839 votes, 3 seats,); ABH (1679 votes, 2 seats, ▼2); GHH (1531 votes, 3 seats, ▼1); PrHul (1325 votes, 2 seats, ▼1); VVD (1101 votes, 1 seat, ▼2); PrHon (510 votes, 0 seats, ▼2); LPF (220 votes, 0 seats, (New)); GL (212 votes, 0 seats, (New)); Total: 14 634 votes, 21 seats, ▼9
Hulst	GH/GB (2693 votes, 4 seats); CDA (2426 votes, 4 seats); PvdA (2052 votes, 3 seats); VVD (1579 votes, 3 seats); PrHul (1465 votes, 3 seats); D66 (291 votes, 0 seats); Total: 10 506 votes, 17 seats	CDA (3691 votes, 7 seats); GH/GB (2693 votes, 4 seats); PvdA (2052 votes, 3 seats); VVD (1579 votes, 3 seats); AB (1559 votes, 4 seats); PrHul (1465 votes, 3 seats); GH (1289 votes, 4 seats); PrHon (884 votes, 2 seats); D66 (291 votes, 0 seats); Total: 15 503 votes, 30 seats	Merged into: Hulst: CDA (3662 votes, 6 seats, ▼1); GH/GB (2555 votes, 4 seats,); PvdA (1839 votes, 3 seats,); ABH (1679 votes, 2 seats, ▼2); GHH (1531 votes, 3 seats, ▼1); PrHul (1325 votes, 2 seats, ▼1); VVD (1101 votes, 1 seat, ▼2); PrHon (510 votes, 0 seats, ▼2); LPF (220 votes, 0 seats, (New)); GL (212 votes, 0 seats, (New)); Total: 14 634 votes, 21 seats, ▼9

==== Sluis (Zeeland, 20 November) ====
Municipality	1998 result	1998 result (combined)	2002 result
Sluis-Aardenburg	VVD/GB (1401 votes, 5 seats); CDA (805 votes, 3 seats); LR (608 votes, 2 seats); PvdA (533 votes, 2 seats); DB&T (432 votes, 1 seat); D66 (148 votes, 0 seats); AOV (48 votes, 0 seats); Total: 3975 votes, 13 seats	DB&T (2859 votes, 6 seats); PvdA (2667 votes, 6 seats); CDA (2460 votes, 7 seats); VVD (1513 votes, 3 seats); VVD/GB (1401 votes, 5 seats); D66 (621 votes, 1 seat); LR (608 votes, 2 seats); Total: 12 177 votes, 30 seats	Merged into: Sluis: CDA (2758 votes, 5 seats, ▼2); VVD/GB (2399 votes, 4 seats, ▼1); PvdA (2099 votes, 4 seats, ▼2); DB&T (2097 votes, 3 seats, ▼3); NW (1822 votes, 3 seats, (New)); GL (516 votes, 0 seats, (New)); LPF (293 votes, 0 seats, (New)); Total: 11 984 votes, 19 seats, ▼11
Oostburg	DB&T (2427 votes, 5 seats); PvdA (2134 votes, 4 seats); CDA (1655 votes, 4 seats); VVD (1513 votes, 3 seats); D66 (473 votes, 1 seat); Total: 8202 votes, 17 seats	DB&T (2859 votes, 6 seats); PvdA (2667 votes, 6 seats); CDA (2460 votes, 7 seats); VVD (1513 votes, 3 seats); VVD/GB (1401 votes, 5 seats); D66 (621 votes, 1 seat); LR (608 votes, 2 seats); Total: 12 177 votes, 30 seats	Merged into: Sluis: CDA (2758 votes, 5 seats, ▼2); VVD/GB (2399 votes, 4 seats, ▼1); PvdA (2099 votes, 4 seats, ▼2); DB&T (2097 votes, 3 seats, ▼3); NW (1822 votes, 3 seats, (New)); GL (516 votes, 0 seats, (New)); LPF (293 votes, 0 seats, (New)); Total: 11 984 votes, 19 seats, ▼11

==== Terneuzen (Zeeland, 20 November) ====
Municipality	1998 result	1998 result (combined)	2002 result
Axel	CDA (1857 votes, 5 seats); PvdA (1634 votes, 4 seats); VVD (1016 votes, 3 seats); GPV (768 votes, 2 seats); LS (511 votes, 1 seat); D66 (265 votes, 0 seats); GL (261 votes, 0 seats); Total: 6312 votes, 15 seats	CDA (5718 votes, 12 seats); PvdA (5574 votes, 12 seats); VVD (4184 votes, 9 seats); TOP (2430 votes, 4 seats); D66 (1562 votes, 3 seats); GPV/RPF (1327 votes, 2 seats); GL (1134 votes, 1 seat); SGP (1123 votes, 2 seats); GBGS (1045 votes, 3 seats); GPV (768 votes, 2 seats); LS (511 votes, 1 seat); Total: 25 376 votes, 51 seats	Merged into: Terneuzen: CDA (6313 votes, 9 seats, ▼3); PvdA (5388 votes, 8 seats, ▼4); TOP/GB (3410 votes, 4 seats, ▼3); VVD (2322 votes, 3 seats, ▼6); CU (1711 votes, 2 seats,); SGP (1338 votes, 2 seats,); LPF (1061 votes, 1 seat, (New)); GL (985 votes, 1 seat,); D66 (891 votes, 1 seat, ▼2); Total: 23 419 votes, 31 seats, ▼20
Sas van Gent	GBGS (1045 votes, 3 seats); CDA (831 votes, 3 seats); PvdA (756 votes, 3 seats); VVD (664 votes, 2 seats); D66 (561 votes, 2 seats); Total: 3857 votes, 13 seats	CDA (5718 votes, 12 seats); PvdA (5574 votes, 12 seats); VVD (4184 votes, 9 seats); TOP (2430 votes, 4 seats); D66 (1562 votes, 3 seats); GPV/RPF (1327 votes, 2 seats); GL (1134 votes, 1 seat); SGP (1123 votes, 2 seats); GBGS (1045 votes, 3 seats); GPV (768 votes, 2 seats); LS (511 votes, 1 seat); Total: 25 376 votes, 51 seats	Merged into: Terneuzen: CDA (6313 votes, 9 seats, ▼3); PvdA (5388 votes, 8 seats, ▼4); TOP/GB (3410 votes, 4 seats, ▼3); VVD (2322 votes, 3 seats, ▼6); CU (1711 votes, 2 seats,); SGP (1338 votes, 2 seats,); LPF (1061 votes, 1 seat, (New)); GL (985 votes, 1 seat,); D66 (891 votes, 1 seat, ▼2); Total: 23 419 votes, 31 seats, ▼20
Terneuzen	PvdA (3184 votes, 5 seats); CDA (3030 votes, 4 seats); VVD (2504 votes, 4 seats); TOP (2430 votes, 4 seats); GPV/RPF (1327 votes, 2 seats); SGP (1123 votes, 2 seats); GL (873 votes, 1 seat); D66 (736 votes, 1 seat); Total: 15 207 votes, 23 seats	CDA (5718 votes, 12 seats); PvdA (5574 votes, 12 seats); VVD (4184 votes, 9 seats); TOP (2430 votes, 4 seats); D66 (1562 votes, 3 seats); GPV/RPF (1327 votes, 2 seats); GL (1134 votes, 1 seat); SGP (1123 votes, 2 seats); GBGS (1045 votes, 3 seats); GPV (768 votes, 2 seats); LS (511 votes, 1 seat); Total: 25 376 votes, 51 seats	Merged into: Terneuzen: CDA (6313 votes, 9 seats, ▼3); PvdA (5388 votes, 8 seats, ▼4); TOP/GB (3410 votes, 4 seats, ▼3); VVD (2322 votes, 3 seats, ▼6); CU (1711 votes, 2 seats,); SGP (1338 votes, 2 seats,); LPF (1061 votes, 1 seat, (New)); GL (985 votes, 1 seat,); D66 (891 votes, 1 seat, ▼2); Total: 23 419 votes, 31 seats, ▼20

=== Analysis ===
On 21 November—the day after the elections—Wim Arts wrote that extracting national trends from the municipal reorganization results remained inherently problematic. Political scientist Marcel Boogers noted that outcomes typically reflected a mix of national dynamics and local factors. In his view, some results—such as the continuing decline of D66—aligned with broader national trajectories. However, other cases were more ambiguous. The VVD’s losses in Oss ran counter to its favorable standing in national polls, while the PvdA’s poor showing there may have stemmed from local grievances, particularly dissatisfaction over the SP’s earlier removal from the municipality's governing coalition. Such specifics made national extrapolation difficult if not inadvisable.

Boogers also addressed the SP’s performance in Oss, where the party remained dominant but posted only modest gains. While national polling had indicated surging support for the SP, the party had effectively reached its electoral “ceiling” in the city; the party’s vote share had little room for further growth. Boogers did identify one clear connection between national developments and the local vote: the increased turnout, which he attributed to the recent collapse of the Balkenende cabinet. Without the heightened political attention brought on by the impending election in January, voter participation would likely have been significantly lower.

=== Lilian Marijnissen ===
During the election in Oss, 17-year-old Lilian Marijnissen—daughter of national SP leader Jan Marijnissen—occupied the 16th position on the SP’s candidate list. Her candidacy prompted a minor controversy when the LPF's municipal lead candidate, Fred Gijsbers, argued that her age rendered her ineligible under Dutch electoral law. However, Mayor Herman Klitsie clarified that candidates younger than 18 may legally stand for election, provided they reach the age of majority during the upcoming council term.

Despite her low placement on the list, Lilian Marijnissen secured 550 preference votes—sufficient to win a seat on the Oss city council. Because she had not yet reached the age of eligibility, she was unable to take office immediately following the November 2002 election. Instead, she joined the council on 11 September 2003 after an SP councillor resigned, vacating a seat. Marijnissen remained a member of the Oss municipal council until 20 October 2016, later entering the national parliament in March 2017. In December of that same year, she succeeded Emile Roemer as SP parliamentary leader. She stood as the party's lead candidate in the general elections of 2021 and November 2023 before resigning in December 2023.
