= Ferry Hoogendijk =

Dutch journalist and politician (1933–2014)

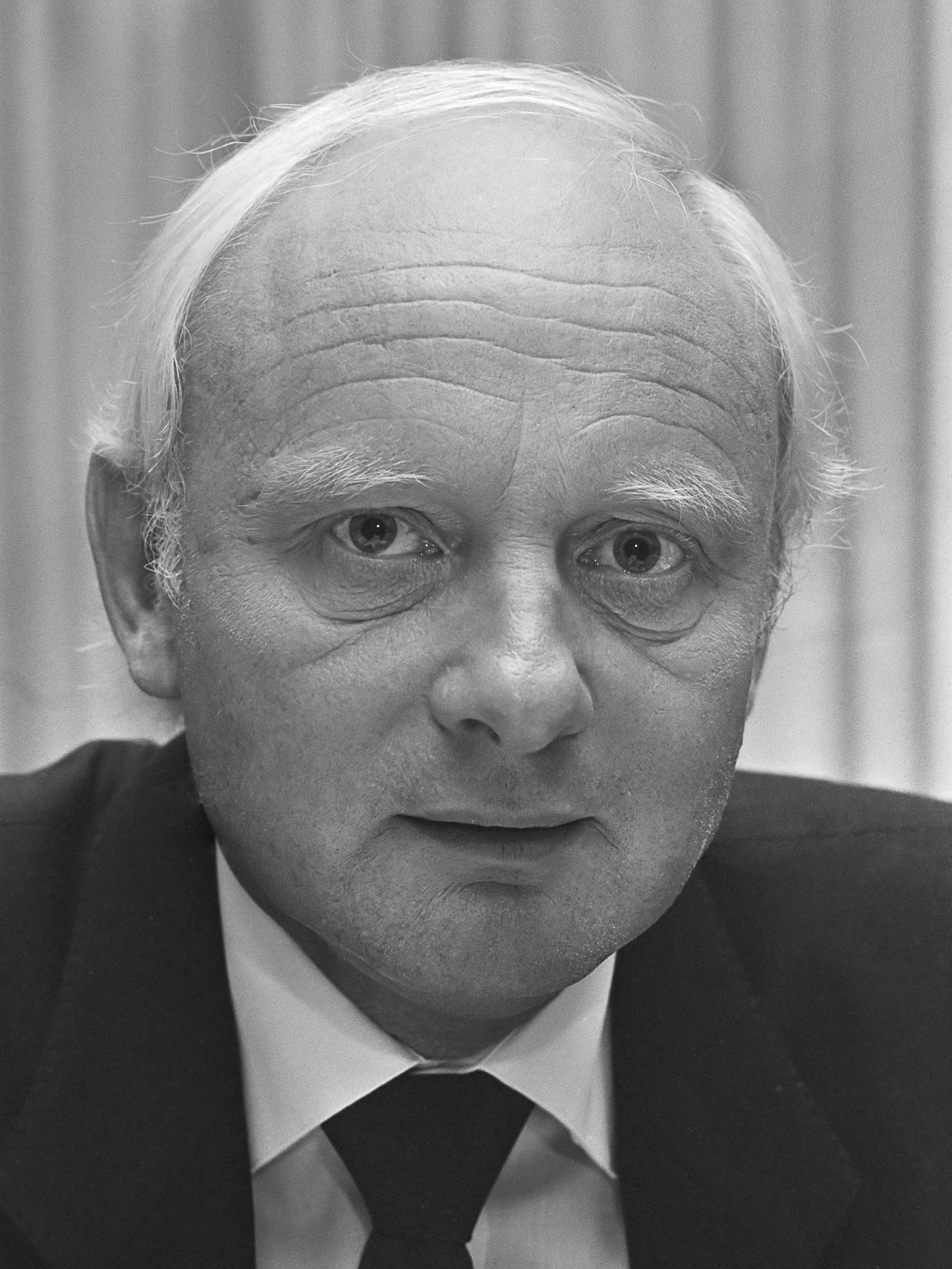
- Hoogendijk in 1983

Member of the House of Representatives
- In office 23 May 2002 – 30 January 2003

Personal details
- Born: 23 November 1933 Gouda, Netherlands
- Died: 14 February 2014 (aged 80) Naarden, Netherlands
- Party: People's Party for Freedom and Democracy, Pim Fortuyn List
- Occupation: Journalist

Ferdinand Alexander "Ferry" Hoogendijk (23 November 1933 – 14 February 2014) was a Dutch journalist, political scientist and politician. He served as the editor-in-chief of Elsevier Weekblad and was elected as a member of the Dutch House of Representatives in 2002 for the Pim Fortuyn List party.

== Early life ==
Hoogendijk was born in Gouda. He studied political science at the University of Amsterdam, graduating in 1962. He earned a further doctorate in political science at the VU University Amsterdam. At the ceremony on 12 March 1971 his paranymphs were Norbert Schmelzer and Haya van Someren.

== Career ==
=== Journalism ===
The career of journalism of Hoogendijk started in 1960 at the Algemene Vereniging Radio Omroep, a Dutch public broadcaster. He was a political commentator for the association until 1981. Hoogendijk however achieved most of his fame with the magazine Elsevier. Hoogendijk joined the magazine in 1962 as political editor, by 1966 he joined the main editing staff of the magazine. In 1975 he became editor-in-chief and served in this position until 1985. During his time at Elsevier he became known as "Mr. Schnabbel", for having numerous jobs on the side. Amongst others he secretly wrote campaign texts for parliamentary leader Hans Wiegel of the People's Party for Freedom and Democracy. He also withheld information about an advisership to Gulf Oil. His resignation from Elsevier in 1985 was forced as a consequence. Hoogendijk was also known as a staunch critic of the Den Uyl cabinet. In addition to his work at Elsevier, Hoogendijk also served as a political commentator on various television and radio shows for AVRO and founded the magazine European Affairs after leaving Elsevier. After retiring from political journalism, he began writing on art history and founded the publication Art & Value which he sold after a few years.

=== Politics ===
Hoogendijk was a member of the People's Party for Freedom and Democracy and served on the board of the youth section of the party in the 1950s. During the 1980s he was member of the party's Media commission for seven years. In 1982 he declined a position of State Secretary of Culture. Ed Nijpels nominated him for the position. Hoogendijk later said that he might have taken up the position, were it not that Ruud Lubbers blocked his nomination because Lubbers felt that Hoogendijk had been too critical of him.

In 2002 he joined the Pim Fortuyn List after contacting Fortuyn by fax to offer his services and helped with the search for party candidates. He managed to make his neighbor Herman Heinsbroek join, who would later become Minister of Economic Affairs, the function that Hoogendijk ambitioned for. Hoogendijk was elected in the 2002 Dutch general election to the House of Representatives. In parliament, he focused on defense and economic issues. He was an advisor to LPF member Harry Wijnschenk after he took over as leader. He was involved in the party squabbles that led to the eventual downfall of the party and argued LPF MP Winny de Jong should not serve in parliament due to the state of her mental health. He lost his seat in the 2003 elections and retired from political work after. He subsequently focused on buying art.

Hoogendijk also gave an evidence statement during the trial of Fortuyn's murderer Volkert van der Graaf and accused the judge presiding over the trial of being a left-wing activist with a bias against Fortuyn.

Hoogendijk was known as right-wing most of his life. However, in a 2013 interview he said that capitalism had brought many good things but it had crossed a line.

== Personal life ==
After his career as a journalist Hoogendijk was known as an art collector and trader. He founded and directed the arts magazine Art & Value after his retirement.

Hoogendijk was married twice, he had three daughters from his first marriage and one daughter from his second marriage. During his second marriage, over thirty years before his death, he was diagnosed with prostate cancer.

Hoogendijk was made Officer of the Order of Orange-Nassau.
