= Fieroes Zeroual =

Dutch politician

Member of the House of Representatives
- In office 2002–2003

Personal details
- Born: 29 November 1972 (age 53) Helmond, Netherlands
- Party: Pim Fortuyn List
- Occupation: Politician, businesswoman

Fieroes Zeroual (born 29 November 1972) is a Dutch businesswoman and former politician who served as an MP in the House of Representatives for the Pim Fortuyn List (LPF) from 2002 to 2003.

== Biography ==
Zeroual was born in Helmond, North Brabant in 1972 to a family of Moroccan and Muslim descent. She ran a nail studio in Helmond and a jewelry business in Tilburg. Zeroual was also involved in setting up a local newspaper in Tilburg.

She first became involved in politics in 2002 when she joined the Pim Fortuyn List. According to Hans Smolders, Zeroual telephoned the LPF office after reading Fortuyn's interview on Islam in de Volkskrant and first launched into a barrage of criticism immediately followed by praise for Fortuyn when she said she always read Elsevier columns with great interest and requested to join the party. She subsequently assisted in selecting other candidates for the party with Mat Herben. She was elected to the House of Representatives during the 2002 Dutch general election held that year. In parliament she focused on matters related to asylum and integration. In parliament she stood out because of her open-minded and concise nature, but also short action. Her maiden speech covered only a few lines. However, she also admitted to having mental health struggles in the wake of Fortuyn's death.

Zeroual left politics in 2003 and moved to Hong Kong for a period before relocating to the United States to run a new business focusing on health and nutrition.
