= Rob Hessing =

Dutch politician (born 1942)

Robertus Hendricus Hessing

Leader of the Pim Fortuyn List in the Senate of the Netherlands
- In office 2003–2007

Member of the Senate
- In office 2003–2007

Personal details
- Born: The Hague, Netherlands
- Party: Pim Fortuyn List (2002-2007); Christian Democratic Appeal (before 2002)

Robertus Hendricus (Rob) Hessing (born 23 June 1942) is a Dutch former politician who held the position of State Secretary for the Interior and Kingdom Relations on behalf of the Pim Fortuyn List (LPF) in the first Balkenende cabinet. From 2003 to 2007 he was a member of the Senate.

== Biography ==
Hessing worked as a police officer and was chief of police in Eindhoven and Rotterdam, as well as a security officer for the Dutch diplomatic service. He was initially a member of the Christian Democratic Appeal but served as State Secretary for the Interior as a member of the Pim Fortuyn List in the first Balkenende cabinet. After the cabinet was dissolved a year later following the 2003 Dutch general election, Hessing was elected as a senator for the LPF, replacing the original lead candidate Bob Smalhout who withdrew before the elections. Hessing was the only LPF politician to be elected to the Senate and formed a one-man faction. On 12 June 2007 he left the Senate because the LPF after the party failed to gain enough votes in Senate elections.

Hessing is the brother of Democrats 66 politician Ruud Hessing.

He was also awarded the Order of the Netherlands Lion.
