= Olaf Stuger =

Dutch politician

Olaf Stuger MEP
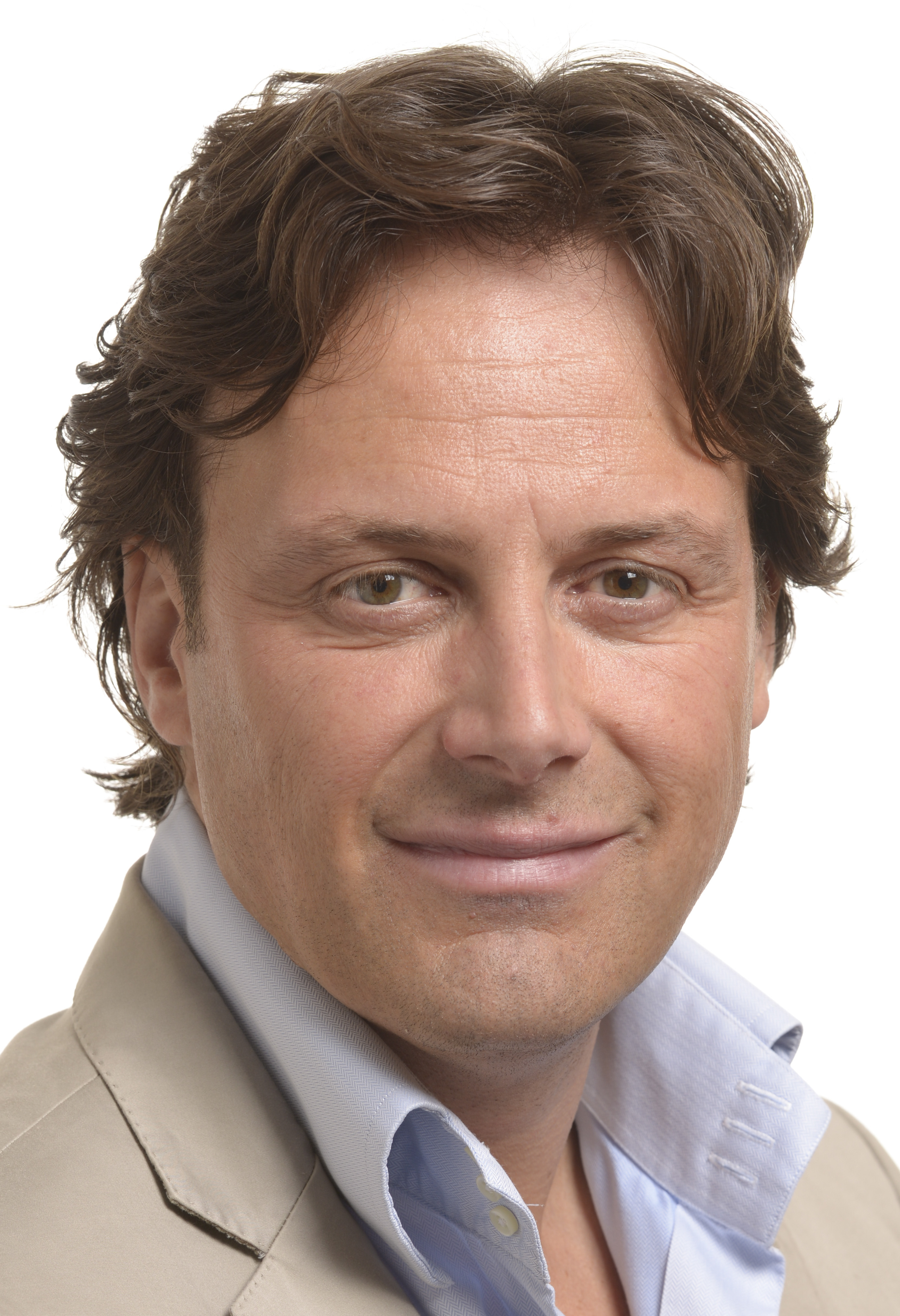

Member of the European Parliament
- In office 1 July 2014 – 1 July 2019
- Constituency: Netherlands

Member of the House of Representatives
- In office 21 September 2006 – 22 November 2006
- In office 22 May 2002 – 22 January 2003

Personal details
- Born: Olaf Frederik Stuger; 3 May 1969 (age 57) Driebergen, Netherlands
- Party: JA21 (2024-)
- Other political affiliations: Democrats 66 (early 1990s); People's Party for Freedom and Democracy (late 1990s); Pim Fortuyn List (2002–2006); Party for Freedom (2006–2019); Otten Group (2020–2021); Independent (2021–2024)
- Spouse: Esther van Fenema
- Children: 3
- Education: Leiden University

Olaf Frederik Stuger (born 3 May 1969) is a Dutch retired politician and former Member of the European Parliament (MEP) from the Netherlands. He represented the Party for Freedom, part of the Europe of Nations and Freedom. He was a member of the House of Representatives for the Pim Fortuyn List from May 2002 till January 2003, and again from September to November 2006 to replace Gerard van As.

== Biography ==
Stuger studied public administration at Leiden University after which he worked in the private sector. He was a manager in the automation sector before working for the lobbying firm Smeets, Stuger & De Vries based in Brussels and The Hague. Together with former MP Bruno Braakhuis he founded the Tax Payers' Union in 2013.

Stuger had previously been a member of Democrats 66 and the VVD during the 1990s. He later joined the Pim Fortuyn List and was elected to parliament in the 2002 Dutch general election. Together with Joost Eerdmans he submitted a private members bill to introduce minimum sentencing for certain violent crimes. Stuger also advocated for life imprisonment for child rapists and child murderers. During his political career he was considered a eurosceptic, calling for the Netherlands to be more assertive within the EU, and opposed mass immigration. During the 2003 Dutch general election Stuger lost his seat when the LPF saw a decline in support but later rejoined the House to replace Gerard van As in September 2006.

For the Dutch general election of 2006 he was party leader for the Pim Fortuyn List, which was then using the name List Five Fortuyn (Lijst Vijf Fortuyn) but the party did not win any seats.

At the 2014 European Parliament election he was elected as a Member of the European Parliament (MEP) for the Party for Freedom and sat with the Europe of Nations and Freedom. In the 2019 European Parliament election Stuger was second on the PVV's list but was not elected and departed from frontline politics soon after.

He later joined Henk Otten's Group Otten party in 2020 but was no longer active a year later.
