= Winny de Jong =

Dutch politician

Personal details
- Born: 9 October 1958 (age 67) Hazerswoude-Rijndijk
- Party: Lijst Pim Fortuyn

Winny de Jong (born 9 October 1958 in Hazerswoude-Rijndijk) is a former Dutch politician.

From 28 May 2002 till 30 January 2003 she was a member of the House of Representatives of the Netherlands; at first for the Lijst Pim Fortuyn (LPF) and since October 2002 for the Groep De Jong.

== Personal life & LPF ==
Her family moved to Monheim am Rhein in Germany when she was four years old. In 1989 she moved back to the Netherlands and started a career as a photo model and actress.

She became head of the Consumer and Quality of the Central Food Trade Agency, a position that regularly caused her to be at loggerheads with the farmers in the Netherlands, including Wien van den Brink, who later became her colleague in the LPF parliamentary faction.

She got some publicity after Pim Fortuyn had asked her as future fractievoorzitter (faction leader) for the LPF. She was also tipped as a future leader of the party by the media. She was elected to go the House of Representatives for the LPF on 15 May 2002 but could not be sworn in as a member until 28 May because of a mental breakdown caused by the campaign and the death of Pim Fortuyn. This also caused her to miss the election for fractievoorzitter. Later Winny de Jong declared her labile behavior was caused by a bipolar disorder.

De Volkskrant reported in an article about incivility in Dutch politics that Winny de Jong called her political adversaries "landverraders" (traitors to the country) and Els Borst "een fossiel" (a fossil). Winny de Jong called Ferry Hoogendijk, who was her colleague at the time, a "dictator". Hoogendijk said: "De Jong had a manic depression. If you become a member of the House of Representatives you shouldn't have an illness like that".

== Groep De Jong ==
She defected together with Cor Eberhard from the LPF-fractie on 1 October 2002 because of dissatisfaction with the fractievoorzitter of the LPF, Harry Wijnschenk. De Jong and Eberhard continued together under the name Groep De Jong. Winny de Jong was fractievoorzitter of the Groep De Jong.

== DeConservatieven.nl ==
Later she founded the political party DeConservatieven.nl. With this party, she unsuccessfully participated in the election for the House of Representatives in January 2003. The fact that she used a "sexy" photoshoot in men's magazine Panorama as part of the election campaign is unprecedented in Dutch political history.
