= João Varela (politician) =

Dutch politician (born 1974)

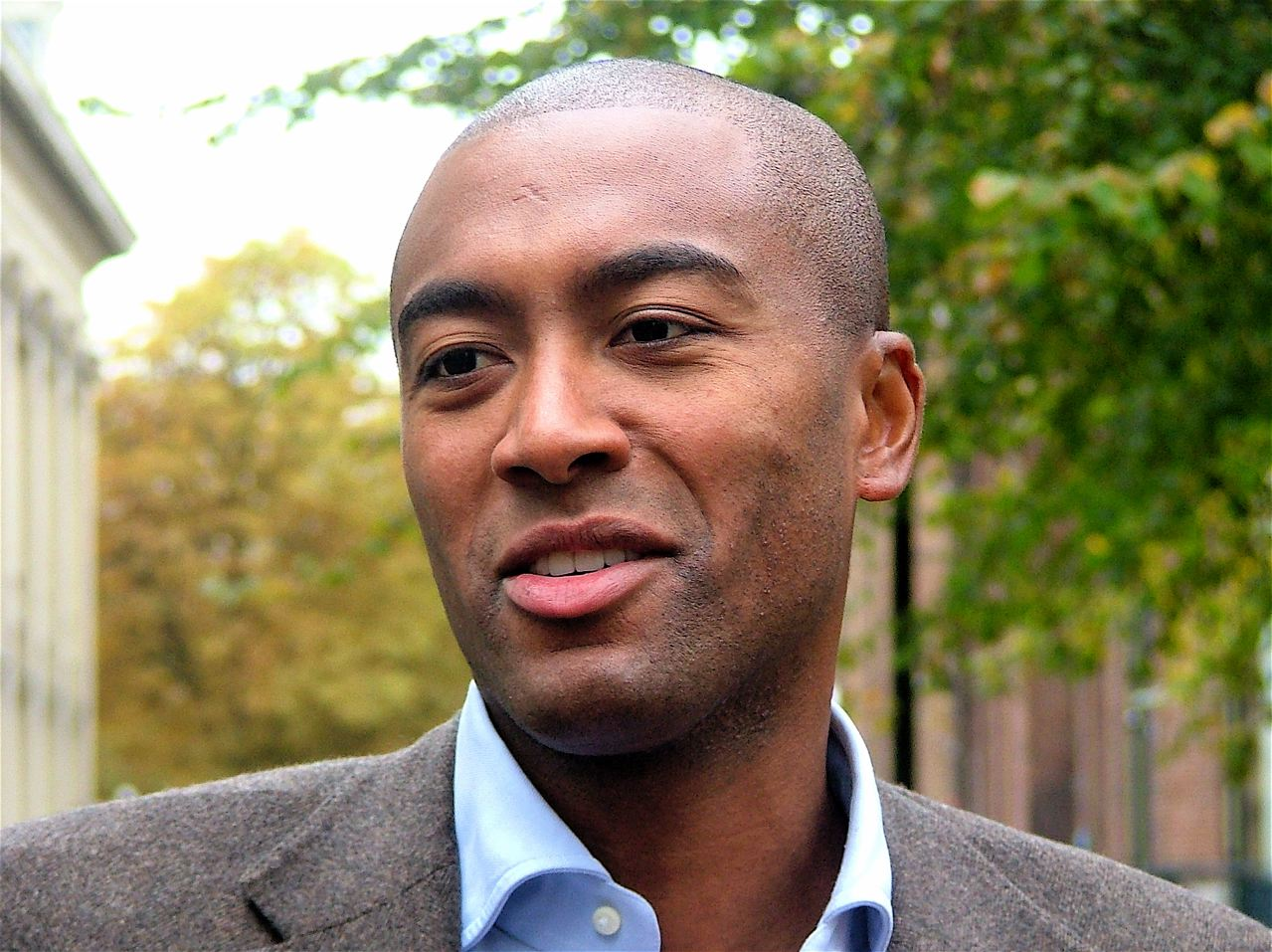

Member of the House of Representatives
- In office 15 May 2002 – 22 November 2006

Personal details
- Born: João Varela; 19 October 1974 (age 51) Cape Verde
- Party: Pim Fortuyn List
- Education: Erasmus University Rotterdam
- Occupation: Politician, businessman, columnist

João Varela (born 19 October 1974) is a Dutch journalist and former politician who served as an MP in the House of Representatives for the Pim Fortuyn List (LPF) from 2002 to 2006. He was the LPF's number two candidate during the 2002 general election and was elected in first place after the assassination of the LFP's leader Pim Fortuyn.

== Early life ==
Varela was born in Cape Verde in 1974 and was raised in a strict Catholic family. At the age of six he moved to the Netherlands with his parents. His father worked for the Van Nelle coffee company. Verela ran away from home and was subsequently fostered by a Dutch family. He was a semi-professional tennis player at a young age before studying an economics degree at Erasmus University Rotterdam and was employed as a marketing manager for L’Oreal.

== Political career ==
Varela became close friends with Pim Fortuyn during his studies at Erasmus University in Rotterdam. He joined the newly created Pim Fortuyn List in 2002 and offered his services as a parliamentary candidate. Varela was placed second on the party list for the 2002 general election at the personal recommendation of Fortuyn who also suggested that Varela would serve as minister for immigration if he was elected as Prime Minister. During the election campaign, Verela became a recognizable public face for the LPF through being a prominent ethnic minority candidate in the party.

Fortuyn was assassinated in the run-up to the election but was still put forward as the posthumous number one candidate while Varela became the lead candidate by default. He was subsequently elected to the House of Representatives.

In parliament, Varela focused on issues such as social affairs, youth, migration, employment, finance, law and order, and economic affairs. He also supported reducing immigration, stricter measures to assimilate migrants and defended Fortuyn's views on Islam. However, he also supported granting pardons to existing illegal immigrants and asylum seekers if they met certain criteria such as knowledge of the Dutch language, economic skills and having no criminal history.

Varela was not elected at the 2006 elections when the LPF lost all of its representation in parliament and retired from politics soon after. In 2006, he was also a candidate for alderman and deputy mayor of the Westland municipality, however the position was allocated to LPF politician Ben van der Stee.

== After politics ==
After leaving the House of Representatives, Varela trained and began working as an accountant. He also works as a weekly columnist for the Financial Telegraaf magazine and as an ambassador for the Ambition by Sport charity for disadvantaged youth. He also appeared as a celebrity contestant in the first season Sterren Dansen Op Het IJs the Dutch spin off of Dancing on Ice.
