= André Peperkoorn =

Dutch general and former politician

André Peperkoorn is a Dutch military general, counter-terrorism official and former politician.

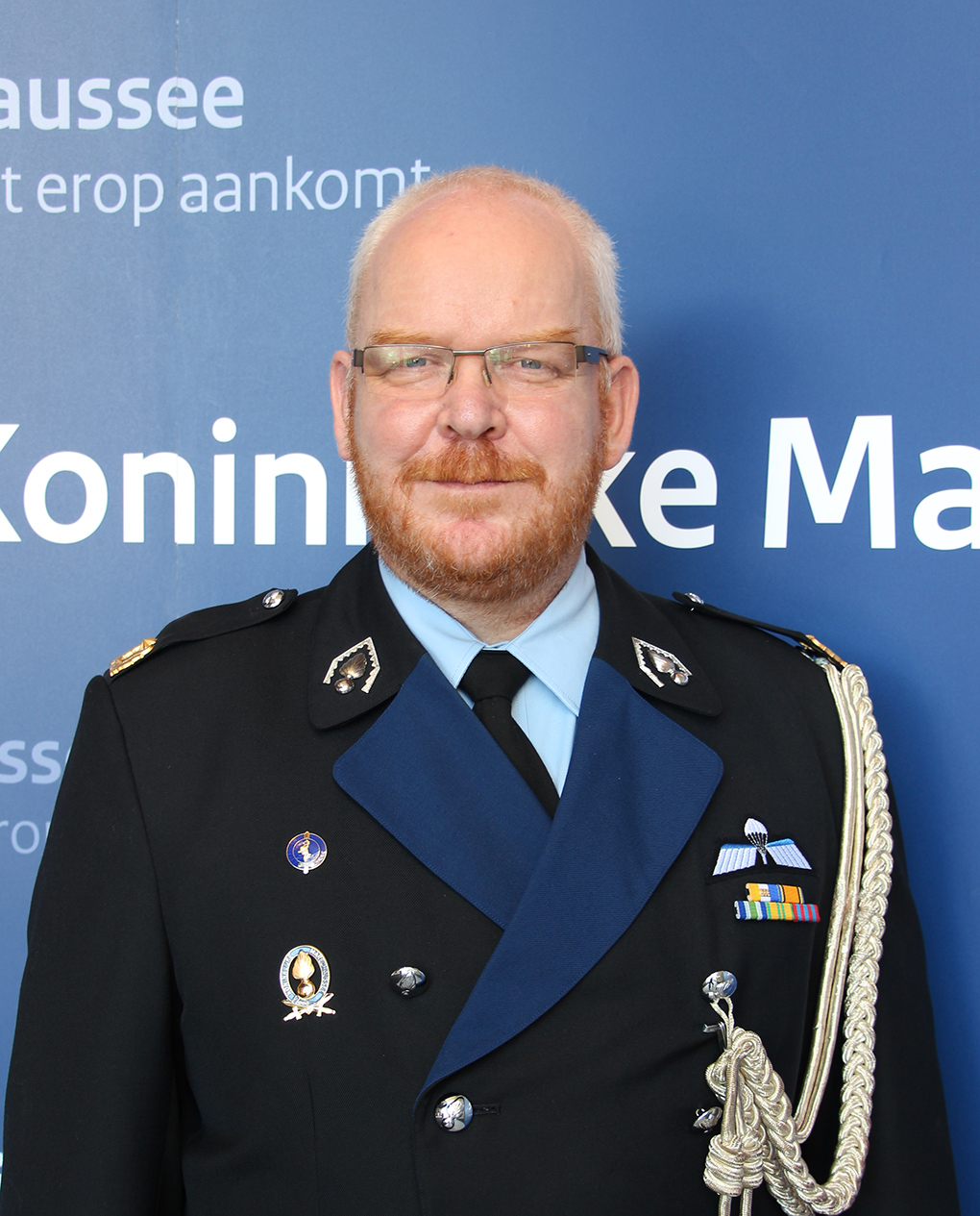

Peperkoorn served as a lieutenant colonel in the Dutch military police and later a counter-terrorism officer with the Royal Marechaussee and Dutch ministry of defense. Ahead of the 2002 Dutch general election, Peperkoon was approached by Pim Fortuyn to stand for his party the Pim Fortuyn List. He was placed seventh on the LPF's electoral list for the Member of the House of Representatives after the original seventh candidate Martin Kievits was expelled from the LPF after being accused of assault. Peperkoorn was subsequently elected to the House in 2002, but did not take up his seat and renounced his position in politics citing difficulty with the intense media storm following the assassination of Fortuyn. His seat in parliament was taken over by Harry Wijnschenk. Peperkoorn subsequently returned to work for the military and attained the rank of general. He was appointed Order of Orange-Nassau in 2018.
