= Sergej Moleveld =

Dutch businessman and former politician

Hendrik Edgar Sergej Moleveld (born 20 January 1971) is a Dutch businessman and former politician.

Moleveld was a key founding member of the Pim Fortuyn List (LPF) party and helped Pim Fortuyn to set up the LPF in 2002 after Fortuyn had been dismissed as party leader of Liveable Netherlands. He also masterminded some of the party's campaign during the 2002 Dutch general election and from 2002 to 2004 served as chairman of the LPF following Fortuyn's assassination. In 2003, he was elected as a member of the Provincial Council of South Holland for the LPF.

In 2004, Moleveld encountered controversy when it was found he had forged threatening letters and faxes to himself and fellow LPF politicians. He subsequently issued an apology and resigned from his role as chairman of the party.
