= Pim Fortuyn List =

Dutch political party

Pim Fortuyn List Lijst Pim Fortuyn
- Abbreviation: LPF
- Leader: Pim Fortuyn (first); Olaf Stuger (last)
- Chairman: Pim Fortuyn (first); Bert Snel (last)
- Founder: Pim Fortuyn
- Founded: 14 February 2002; 24 years ago
- Dissolved: 1 January 2008; 18 years ago
- Split from: Livable Netherlands
- Headquarters: Spaanse Kubus; Vlaardingweg 62; Rotterdam
- Youth wing: Jonge Fortuynisten
- Thinktank: Prof.Dr. W.S.P. Fortuynstichting
- Ideology: Classical liberalism; Conservative liberalism; Fortuynism; Right-wing populism; Republicanism; Euroscepticism
- Political position: Right-wing
- European Parliament group: Union for Europe of the Nations
- Colours: Yellow; Blue
- Slogan: At your service! (2002): Geef ons een 2e kans (Give us a second chance, 2003); Wij hebben lef, wij stemmen LPF (We have courage, we vote LPF) (2003)

The Pim Fortuyn List (Dutch: Lijst Pim Fortuyn, LPF) was a political party in the Netherlands that existed from 2002 to 2008 at a national level and was named after its eponymous founder Pim Fortuyn, a former university professor and political columnist. The party was often considered right-wing populist and nationalist by media and political observers due to its policies as well as adhering to its own distinct ideology of Fortuynism according to some commentators which reflected the political ideas of Fortuyn.

The LPF supported tougher measures against immigration and crime, opposition to multiculturalism, greater political reform, a reduction in state bureaucracy and was eurosceptic but differed somewhat from other European right-wing or nationalist parties by taking a liberal stance on certain social issues and sought to describe its ideology as pragmatic and not populistic. It also aimed to present itself as an alternative to the Polder model of Dutch politics and the governing style of the existing mainstream parties.

Pim Fortuyn had initially had planned to contest the 2002 general election as leader of the Livable Netherlands (LN) party. He was however dismissed as leader of LN in February 2002 due to controversial remarks he made in a newspaper interview on immigration-related issues, and instead founded LPF a few days later, taking many former LN candidates with him. After gaining support in opinion polls, Fortuyn was assassinated on 6 May 2002, nine days before the election. The party held onto its support, and went on to become the second-largest party in the election.

The LPF formed part of a coalition government with the Christian Democratic Appeal (CDA) and the People's Party for Freedom and Democracy (VVD) as part of the first Balkenende cabinet and was granted ministerial posts. However, internal conflicts in the LPF led to the coalition's break-up and fresh elections after a few months. Following the 2003 election, the party was left in opposition. It became clear that the party was not viable without its original leader, and it went into decline until it was finally dissolved in 2008. Despite this, Fortuyn and the LPF have had a significant influence on changing public discourse on immigration, multiculturalism, and political reform, and went on to influence politicians in both older and newer political parties in the Netherlands.

== History ==
=== Background ===
The LPF was founded by its namesake, Pim Fortuyn, a former sociology professor who had become known in the Netherlands as an author, press columnist and a media commentator. Fortuyn had announced his intention to run for parliament in a television interview on 20 August 2001. An unusual aspect of this was that it was not yet clear which political party he would be a candidate for. Although he was already in contact with the Livable Netherlands (LN) party, he initially also considered running for the Christian Democratic Appeal (for whom he had briefly worked as an advisor) or creating his own list. He subsequently became a member of the LN in 2001 at the encouragement of its chairman Jan Nagel. On 25 November he was chosen as party leader for the LN. The LN functioned as the combined national extension of various movements that existed as localist alternatives to the main parties and had contested municipal elections but had never contested in national elections before. Fortuyn concluded his acceptance speech by saying the words that would become his slogan; "At your service!" Almost immediately after Fortuyn became leader, LN went from 2% in opinion polls to about 17%.

In January 2002, it was announced that Fortuyn also would head the Livable Rotterdam (LR) list for the March 2002 local elections at the request of its founder Ronald Sorensen. At the time, Livable Rotterdam was considered the local counterpart to LN. The official 2002 election study found that immigration and integration problems were the second most important issue for voters after issues concerning the health care system. Helped by the many speeches and interviews given by Fortuyn, immigration issues became the major topic of the national political agenda, thereby forcing other parties to react.

Until February, Liveable Netherlands had received disproportionate and generally sympathetic coverage in the media. The situation took a dramatic turn on 9 February, when Fortuyn was interviewed in de Volkskrant, one of the leading national newspapers. Against the strong advice of his campaign team, he made several controversial statements; including one that said Islam was "a backward culture", that no more asylum seekers would be allowed into the country, and, if necessary, the possible repeal of anti-racism clauses in the Dutch Constitution to protect freedom of speech. Fortuyn maintained that if he came to power, he would pardon asylum seekers and illegal immigrants who had been in the Netherlands for a certain period but if legally possible he would close the borders to Muslim immigrants. Fortuyn was summoned to an emergency meeting by the LN party board and asked to retract his statements, but after refusing he was dismissed as party leader the next day. In a television interview, Fortuyn said that the split was irreparable, although he would have preferred to remain in the party.

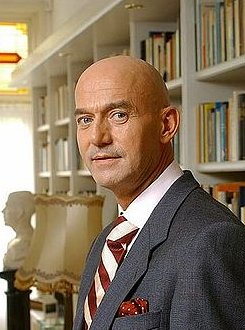
Founder and Leader Pim Fortuyn on 4 May 2002.

=== Establishment ===
Fortuyn founded Pim Fortuyn List (LPF) on 14 February taking several former LN members and candidates with him. He began assembling candidates to stand in the upcoming general election. Fortuyn secured financial backing from several individuals involved in the property development sector and was allocated an office and campaign headquarters in downtown Rotterdam. Within a short time, Fortuyn was able to secure thirty candidates for the election. Mat Herben was appointed as LPF group leader. Second on the party's list was João Varela, originally from Cape Verde whom Fortuyn proposed as immigration minister should he become prime minister. Fortuyn also recruited Jim Janssen van Raaij a former member of the European Parliament for the CDA and one of few on the list with professional political experience. Others included former editor of Elsevier Ferry Hoogendijk, ex-drafts champion Harm Wiersma, civil servant Joost Eerdmans, Surinamese broadcaster Philomena Bijlhout, counter-terrorism officer André Peperkoorn, spokesman for farmers Wien van den Brink, spokeswoman for the Central Bureau of Food Trade Winny de Jong and Dutch-Moroccan businesswoman Fieroes Zeroual. The party's candidates were unveiled by Fortuyn at a press conference in March 2002.

Opinion polls soon showed that he took most of LN's supporters with him, leaving LN with its original 2%, while Fortuyn soared to 17%. The local LR—which held on to Fortuyn as its leader—was hugely successful in the March 2002 local elections, as it won more than one third of the vote and became Rotterdam's strongest party, displacing the Labour Party who had governed Rotterdam since World War Two. Fortuyn was subsequently elected to Rotterdam's municipal council.

In the run-up to the 2002 general election, Fortuyn appeared in numerous television and radio interviews to generate publicity, and was featured in the televised leadership debates representing his new party. He was often attacked or derided as an extremist figure by other party leaders (in particular Labour leader Ad Melkert, former prime minister Wim Kok and GroenLinks's Paul Rosenmöller), and both Dutch and foreign media outlets compared Fortuyn to other European far-right party leaders. Fortuyn disputed the comparisons and stated that the press and other party leaders were distorting or mislabeling him and his ideas. However, polling showed rapid and growing support for the LPF, with some polls indicating that the LPF would emerge as the largest party and make Fortuyn a candidate for prime minister. Fortuyn himself maintained that he would not accept a cabinet position headed by another party leader and aimed to take the role of prime minister himself.

=== Fortuyn assassination ===
It was reported in February 2002 that Fortuyn did not dare to appear in public owing to death threats. In March, he was attacked by pie-throwing activists at the presentation of his new book De puinhopen van acht jaar Paars (which became the bestselling book by a Dutch author in the Netherlands in 2002). Despite this, the authorities did not provide protection for Fortuyn, nor did he request protection. In various interviews, including with the BBC and Jensen!, Fortuyn expressed a concern that he would be killed or injured during the election campaign, and argued that if such an event were to happen, the media and Dutch political establishment would be to blame through creating a hostile atmosphere against him.

On 6 May, Fortuyn was assassinated outside a radio studio in Hilversum. This was the first political murder in the Netherlands for centuries (excluding the Second World War). Some claimed that by demonising Fortuyn, the political left and the media had created a climate of opinion that had made the assassination possible. Campaigning immediately stopped, and although some suggested postponing the elections, the campaign resumed (half-heartedly) after his funeral four days later. His funeral was broadcast live on television and, according to Cas Mudde, lead "to scenes of mass hysteria not seen since the Netherlands national football team won the European Championship in 1988." The murder of Fortuyn, together with that of Theo van Gogh two years later, would result in a polarisation in the political debate in the Netherlands, and subsequently changes in immigration-related policies and public discourse.

LPF 2002 election poster featuring Pim Fortuyn with his slogan "At your service!"

=== First Balkenende cabinet (2002–2003) ===
The LPF decided to maintain Fortuyn's posthumous candidacy, and delayed naming a new leader until after the election. The 2002 general election proved a great success for the LPF, yielding 17% of the votes and 26 seats in the House of Representatives—by far a record number of seats in the Netherlands for a new party—to become the second largest party. LN also made it into Parliament, with two seats. The Labour Party (PvdA) and People's Party for Freedom and Democracy (VVD) saw their largest-ever losses, while the Christian Democratic Appeal (CDA) won large gains – later attributed in part to the fact that CDA leader Jan Peter Balkenende had remained neutral and not joined in attacking Fortuyn with other party leaders during debates. Balkenende had earlier announced that his party would follow a tougher line towards asylum seekers and tighten some of the Netherlands's immigration policies, and he later agreed with much of Fortuyn's criticism of the purple coalition and Holland's multicultural society. Some commentators claimed that the CDA was able to draw in voters who otherwise would have supported the LPF (but felt it was no longer viable without Fortuyn in charge) or that the CDA was seen as a stabilizing force after a tense election. As leader of the strongest party, Balkenende became the leading candidate for prime minister.

Following the election, journalist and former civil servant Mat Herben was appointed Fortuyn's successor as LPF party leader in May 2002 while newly elected LPF representatives João Varela and Ferry Hoogendijk became the party's vice-chairmen. Businessman and personal friend of Fortuyn Peter Langendam was appointed chairman by the LPF parliamentary faction and faced the difficult task of shaping the party organization without Fortuyn.

Together with the CDA and the VVD, the LPF formed part of the governing coalition, and supplied several members for the Balkenende cabinet. The party was granted four of fourteen cabinet seats, for immigration, economics, environment, health and sports, and five state secretaries. LPF member Eduard Bomhoff was appointed deputy prime minister. The following day after the cabinet's formation, LPF State Secretary for Social Affairs and Work Opportunity Philomena Bijlhout resigned after it was reported that she had been a member of a Surinamese militia group. She was replaced by fellow LPF MP Khee Liang Phoa.

Without its original leader and lack of a clearly defined organisational structure and political experience among its members, the LPF also succumbed to highly public internal squabbles. MPs within the LPF resigned to sit as independents due to the infighting and the intense media storm following Fortuyn's death or unsuccessfully tried founding splinter parties of their own to contest in the next election. In August 2002, Herben resigned as leader due to the unrest and was briefly replaced by Harry Wijnschenk. However, arguments within the party continued after Wijnschenk was accused of dictatorial behaviour by other faction members which eventually led to the departure of LPF MPs Winny de Jong and Cor Eberhard. Wijnschenk was subsequently ousted from his position and replaced by Herben again, but by October 2002, the break-up of the government coalition was ultimately triggered by the bickering of LPF Ministers Eduard Bomhoff and Herman Heinsbroek who did not get along on a personal level. Although the VVD had suggested that the LPF could replace Bomhoff and Heinsbroek in the cabinet, Bomhoff warned that the other parties would use the opportunity to call a new election. Ultimately, the cabinet fell and a fresh election was called.

=== Opposition and disintegration (2003–2006) ===
In December 2002, the LPF chose Herben to lead the party into the January 2003 general election. Herben was considered a stabilising force amid the infighting which had collapsed the cabinet but his appointment also caused internal confusion since LPF minister Hilbrand Nawijn had been considered the frontrunner to lead the party in December 2002 before voluntarily stepping back on December 7th and then announcing that he wished to return to parliament and become Prime Minister on the same day. During the election campaign, Herben positioned the LPF as the only barrier against a centrist–left government and acknowledged the party's difficult start in government whilst asking voters for a second chance and arguing that the party was now mature enough to govern. Although Herben's performance during televised debates was considered articulate and confident, external commentators felt Herben lacked the same dynamism as Fortuyn and his candidacy softened the LPF into a more conventional right-wing party with a focus on economic policies over the anti-establishment edge it had held under Fortuyn. Meanwhile, some of the other traditional parties began to adopt more conservative messages on issues such as crime and immigration that the LPF had initially campaigned on and mainstreamed some of Fortuyn's original positions. Despite efforts to rebrand and position the LPF as more approachable and having learned from its mistakes in the cabinet, it began to diminish in polls as it struggled to maintain relevance within the political landscape while the other parties were reluctant to consider cooperation with the LPF following the collapse of the first Balkenende cabinet.

During the election, the LPF shrank to 5.7% support and gained eight seats while Balkenende and the CDA retained a majority. Following the election the LPF was exchanged for the Democrats 66 in the government coalition and never returned to government. The LPF found it hard to maintain support in parliamentary opposition as besides Joost Eerdmans, most of its Members of Parliament were not very visible or considered as charismatic as Fortuyn, while party leader Herben had enough work behind the scenes in keeping the party from further infighting. The LPF also went into financial straits as many of its former financial backers left. Other commentators later claimed that the relative inexperience of some of the LPF's members and lack of internal structure also hampered its ability to function as a coherent movement in parliament. As the new coalition continued most of the former coalition's policies and Balkenende stated that he agreed with some of Fortuyn's views on multiculturalism and implemented some of his policy ideas, it became increasingly difficult for the LPF to present the anti-establishment or alternative image to the government which had galvanized support for the party in the first place.

The LPF managed to revive some success in the 2003 Dutch provincial elections in which it won 17 seats in eleven provinces, enabling it to qualify for a seat in the Senate during the 2003 Dutch Senate election which was taken by Rob Hessing. However, the party was beset by further internal problems and won just 2.6% of the vote in the 2004 European Parliament election, and did not win a seat. In this election, Paul van Buitenen surprisingly won two seats with his anti-corruption Europe Transparent (although it was not successful in the long term). By 2004, the LPF had fallen to a less than 1% support and disintegrated. The party had lost most of its members, and for a brief period the parliamentary faction (with exception of Wien van den Brink) had declared itself independent from the party while continuing to use the LPF name in the house. In 2005, a newly elected party board managed to put an end to many of the disputes within the LPF and got party organisation back in order. Herben also stepped back and handed over the faction chairmanship to Gerard van As. As a result, some LPF representatives rejoined the party. That same year, LPF minister and parliamentarian Hilbrand Nawijn held a meeting with Vlaams Belang politician Filip Dewinter in the former home of Fortuyn which caused uproar within the party since Fortuyn had stated he had wanted nothing to do with Dewinter's former Vlaams Blok party. Nawijn subsequently left the LPF and announced the formation of a new party with ideas closer to Vlaams Belang.

In 2006, Van As announced his departure from the LPF to join Nawijn's Party for the Netherlands. A week after Van As' departure, Joost Eerdmans was expelled from the parliamentary faction after signalling his intention to join the EénNL party founded by Marco Pastors and was subsequently joined by other former LPF parliamentarians. In March 2006, the LPF decided to go ahead with contesting the 2006 Dutch municipal elections and saw a relatively strong performance in the municipalities of Westland, Spijkenisse and Eindhoven with the LPF receiving its first alderman in Westland.

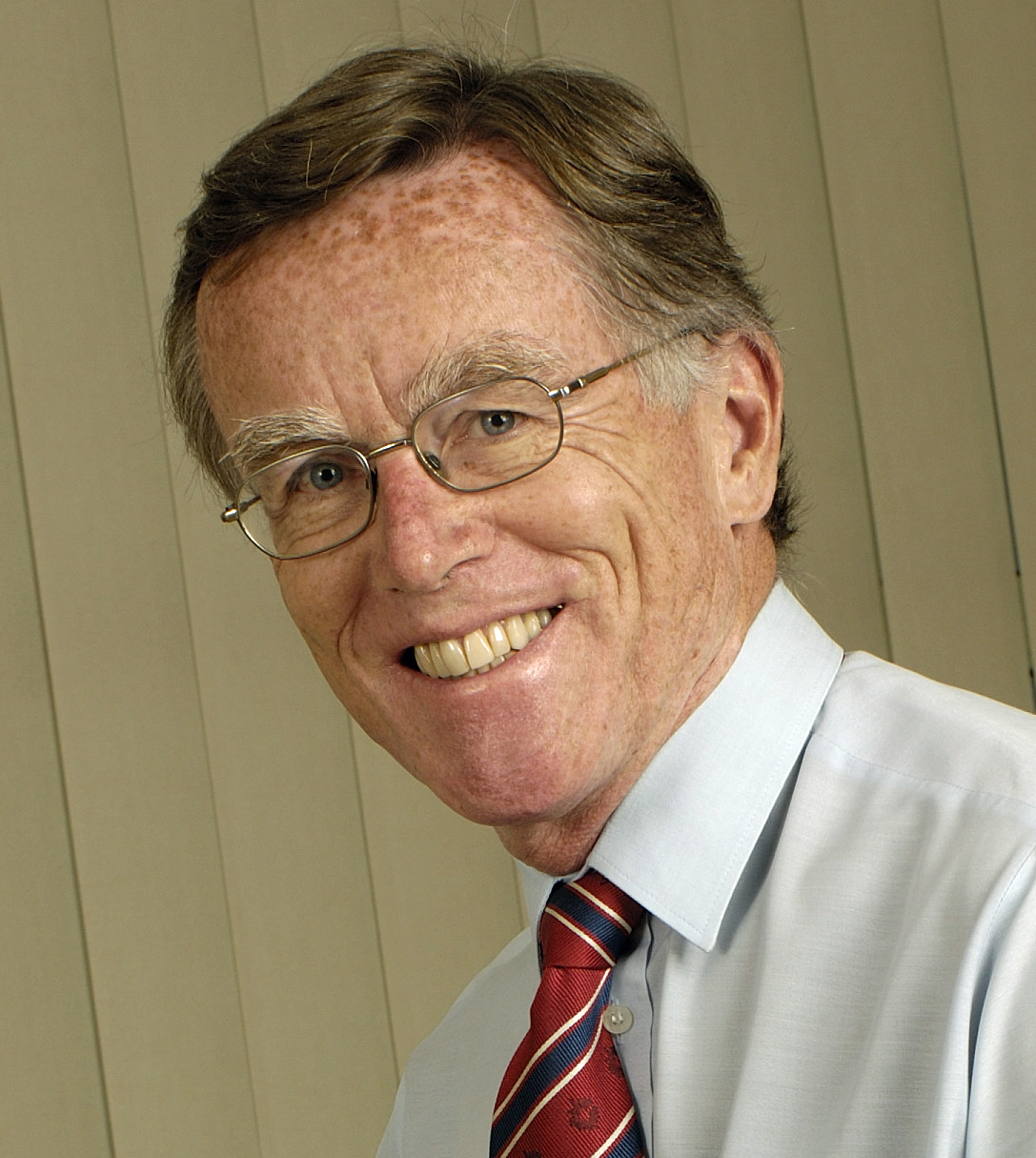
Eduard Bomhoff, Deputy Prime Minister in the First Balkenende cabinet.

=== List Five Fortuyn and dissolution (2006–2008) ===
The LPF attempted to start afresh for the 2006 general election and participated in the election under its new name List Five Fortuyn (Lijst Vijf Fortuyn). On 25 September 2006, the party released a controversial campaign commercial which featured new leader Olaf Stuger coming down from "heaven" with a parachute and presenting himself as a "reincarnation" of Pim Fortuyn. Marten Fortuyn, brother of Pim Fortuyn, declared it "outrageous and tasteless." In the election, LVF did not receive enough votes to secure a seat with support of only 0.2%. Much of its voter base and support became splintered across several new parties, some of which had been established by former members of the LPF. It also lost all of its seats in the 2007 Provincial Council elections, meaning it was no longer eligible for representation in the Senate. By this stage, many former LPF supporters were switching to the new Party for Freedom led by Geert Wilders which contained similar policies to the LPF and emerged as a successor.

In 2006, the party decided to close its office in the Hague since it was no longer represented in national or provincial politics. In July 2007, the party held a meeting in which its delegates voted to dissolve itself by 1 January 2008. The decision was opposed by the party's youth-wing and LPF municipal branches in the Hague and Eindhoven who all declared they would continue under the LPF banner as independent organisations. As a result, the LPF name has only existed at a municipal level since 2008.

== Ideology ==
The party was variously described as populist, nationalist, conservative-liberal, national-liberal, national-conservative, classical-liberal, eurosceptic and anti-Islam. Some scholars and political scientists observed that the LPF presented a distinct ideology that differed from other populist parties in Europe while Fortuyn himself maintained that both he and the party based their beliefs on pragmatic, not populistic ideas and wanted the LPF to represent an alternative set of policy solutions to what Fortuyn regarded as an identical consensus within the existing Dutch political establishment.

=== Fortuynism ===
The ideology or political style that is derived from Pim Fortuyn, and in turn the LPF, is often called Fortuynism. Observers variously saw him as a political protest targeting the alleged elitism and bureaucratic style of the Dutch purple coalitions or as offering an appealing political style. The style was characterized variously as one "of openness, directness and clearness", populism or simply as charisma. Another school holds Fortuynism as a distinct ideology, with an alternative vision of society. Some argued that Fortuynism was not just one ideology, but contained liberalism, populism and nationalism. Gerrit Boerman, the head of the Document Center for Dutch Political Parties at the University of Groningen described Fortuyn's and by extension the LPF's ideology as not fitting into the traditional left-right pattern and described it as a "cocktail of elements stemming from different directions" which included strands of conservatism, communitarianism, libertarianism, classical and social liberalism, and national-populism.

During the 2002 campaign, Fortuyn was accused of being on the "extreme right", although others saw only certain similarities. Comparisons were drawn between Fortuyn and the LPF with far-right populist leaders and parties in Europe such as Jean-Marie Le Pen and his French National Front by foreign journalists and these were often referred to by the Dutch media and rival politicians. However, this was strongly disputed by Fortuyn who stated he wanted nothing to do with such leaders while the LPF called the comparisons "over-simplified" and inaccurate, asserting that the party's immigration programme was not based on hatred of foreigners. While Fortuyn employed anti-immigration rhetoric, he was neither a radical nationalist nor a defender of traditional authoritarian values. On the contrary, Fortuyn wanted to protect the socio-culturally liberal values of the Netherlands, women's rights and sexual minorities (he was openly homosexual himself), from the "backward" Islamic culture. Fortuyn often maintained that his opposition to immigration was not motivated by race or skin colour and that he was not opposed to a multi-racial society. The LPF also won support from some ethnic minorities and fielded candidates from immigrant backgrounds during the 2002 election; one of Fortuyn's closest associates was of Cape Verdean origin while one of the party's MPs was a young woman of Turkish descent.

==== Domestic policy ====
Many of the LPF's policies for the 2002 general election were based on proposals put forward in Fortuyn's book De puinhopen van acht jaar Paars. The LPF campaigned on a strong law and order message at both local and national levels. The party supported cutting state bureaucracy while strengthening public services. The party also called for reforms to the Netherlands' employment policy, proposed reducing the number of civil servants and abolishing permanent contracts for government employees. It also wanted to revise and strongly restrict immigration and asylum policies, particularly from Islamic societies, as well as put an end to the Dutch government's policy of pursuing multiculturalism. Instead, the party argued for compulsory policies that existing immigrants learn Dutch and become integrated while future immigration would be reduced or halted until existing immigrants had been assimilated. However, Fortuyn also maintained that asylum seekers or illegal immigrants who had been living in the Netherlands for a long period should not be deported and instead be pardoned and offered a path to citizenship if they demonstrated the ability to assimilate into Dutch society and had not committed crimes while potential migrants would be offered financial incentives to stay in their own country. During the 2002 election and cabinet formation, the LPF proposed that asylum seekers who already had been in the Netherlands for more than five years could be pardoned while the government should temporarily stop all future immigration and asylum intake. In the First Balkenende cabinet, LPF immigration minister Hilbrand Nawijn proposed the One-off Regulation 2003 which would give a grace period for long-term asylum seekers to gain residency while asylum migration would be frozen for a period, however the cabinet collapsed before this could be effectuated. The party also supported the right to freedom of speech and took a socially liberal stance on issues such as gay rights, soft drug legalization and gender equality.

The LPF also supported reforming the Dutch economic model, arguing that outdated bureaucracy and welfare systems had created psychological and physical barriers to entrepreneurship and modernization of the economy. Fortuyn supported locating workplaces, smaller schools and regional hospitals closer to communities, expanding internet infrastructure outside of cities and replacing parts of the state with digital technology. Some political historians describe the LPF as supporting "market populist" ideas and holding both a free market vision while stressing communitarian ideas and being one of the first European populist parties associated with a rise in anti-globalization arguments.

==== Foreign policy ====
Although the LPF was established post-9/11, Fortuyn had already developed a worldview based on the "clash between civilizations", namely between "modernity" and Islam, or Western society and Islamic culture. The LPF supported NATO, but was eurosceptic and saw the European Union as a "bureaucracy which barely interests its citizens, let alone inspires them." The party was against the euro currency (which the Netherlands had adopted in 1999), EU influence over Dutch domestic regulation, and opposed the Netherlands participating in the European Schengen agreement. Fortuyn also campaigned to reduce Dutch financial contributions to the European Union and criticised the EU for being "elite" and "technocratic". The party however did not oppose the principle of economic and political cooperation between European countries and the project of European integration in general, but rather the EU's present organization, and what it regarded as its lack of democracy, excessive bureaucracy and threat to national sovereignty. The LPF also warned that unopposed EU expansion would lead to the Netherlands becoming absorbed into a Federal Superstate in which Dutch identity would be lost. Opposing the full membership of Turkey, Albania, Ukraine, Belarus and Russia, the LPF maintained that the European Union "shouldn't cross the Bosporus and the Ural". The LPF was also supportive of Israel.

== Legacy ==
Fortuyn's political heritage became scattered among various politicians in the Netherlands, several of whom had begun their careers in the LPF and tried founding parties of their own, most of which were unsuccessful. These included Marco Pastors and Joost Eerdmans, founders of the One NL, Winny de Jong of DeConservatieven.nl, and Hilbrand Nawijn, leader of the Party for the Netherlands—none of which managed to win a seat in the 2003 or 2006 elections. Other parties included Forza! Nederland founded by Paul Meijer and Fleur Agema, both former members of the LPF branch on the States-Provincial of North Holland. The LPF also influenced politicians in the Flemish region of Belgium, such as lawyer and Open VLD member Hugo Coveliers who went on to found the VLOTT party based on Fortuyn's ideas, and Jean-Marie Dedecker and his Lijst Dedecker party. Former New Flemish Alliance leader and Minister-President of Flanders Geert Bourgeois was inspired to write De puinhoop van Paars-Groen (The wreckage of Purple-Green) based on Fortuyn's De puinhopen van acht jaar Paars which offered similar critiques and solutions for the Belgian political system.

However, in the Netherlands the LPF became squeezed out by the tougher line on immigration and integration issues taken by mainstream politicians, such as Minister for Integration and Immigration Rita Verdonk, who had largely adopted Fortuyn's policies. By the end of the decade, former LPF supporters had mostly moved to support Geert Wilders and his Party for Freedom (PVV). Traces of Fortuyn's legacy have remained at a national political level with former LPF politician Fleur Agema being elected to parliament for the Party for Freedom and later becoming Deputy Prime Minister of the Netherlands in 2024.

In February 2006, soon before it fell out of parliament, the scholar Hans Jansen organised a conference in cooperation with the scientific committee of the LPF in the House of Representatives building that brought together several international anti-Islam figures, including Bat Ye'or, Daniel Pipes, Geert Wilders, Robert Spencer, Bruce Bawer, Lars Hedegaard, Ibn Warraq, Paul Beliën and Peder "Fjordman" Jensen. This movement would eventually become known as the counter-jihad movement.

In 2020, Eerdemans founded the JA21 party which claims to want to help "Fortuyn's ideas return to the House of Representatives". The party won nine seats in the 2025 Dutch general election.

Although dissolved at national level, the name Pim Fortuyn List continued to be used for a period at municipal level by local branches that split off from the LPF in Eindhoven, Boornsterhem, Westland and The Hague. As of 2018, the last remaining local party using Pim Fortuyn List were in Eindhoven and Westland which competed in the municipal elections under the names LPF Eindhoven and LPF Westland. In 2022 a new local Pim Fortuyn List entered the municipal elections in the city of Breda winning one seat in the council. The LPF's youth-wing the Jonge Fortuynisten continues to remain active as an independent organisation and is affiliated to LPF Eindhoven.

== Election results ==
=== House of Representatives ===
General elections
Election	List	Votes	%	Seats	+/–	Government
2002	List	1,614,801	17.0	26 / 150	New	Coalition
2003	List	549,975	5.7	8 / 150	▼18	Opposition
2006	List	20,956	0.2	0 / 150	▼8	Extra-parliamentary

=== European Parliament ===
European Parliament elections
Election	Votes	%	Seats	+/–
2004	121,509	2.6	0 / 27	New

== Leadership ==
- Leader
  - Pim Fortuyn (14 February 2002 – 6 May 2002) (†)
  - Vacant (6 May 2002 – 16 May 2002)
  - Mat Herben (16 May 2002 – 28 August 2002)
  - Harry Wijnschenk (28 August 2002 – 16 October 2002)
  - Mat Herben (16 October 2002 – 5 October 2004)
  - Gerard van As (5 October 2004 – 17 August 2006)
  - Mat Herben (17 August 2006 – 30 September 2006)
  - Olaf Stuger (30 September 2006 – 30 November 2006)
  - Vacant (30 November 2006 – 1 January 2008)
- Chairmen
  - Pim Fortuyn (14 February 2002 – 6 May 2002) (†)
  - Peter Langendam (11 May 2002 – 14 May 2002)
  - Ed Maas (3 July 2002 – 13 October 2003)
  - Sergej Moleveld (31 August 2004 – 12 November 2004)
  - Bert Snel (10 December 2004 – 1 January 2008)

- Parliamentary leaders in the Senate
  - Rob Hessing (10 June 2003 – 12 June 2007)
- Parliamentary leaders in the House of Representatives
  - Mat Herben (23 May 2002 – 28 August 2002)
  - Harry Wijnschenk (28 August 2002 – 16 October 2002)
  - Mat Herben (16 October 2002 – 5 October 2004)
  - Gerard van As (5 October 2004 – 17 August 2006)
  - Mat Herben (17 August 2006 – 30 November 2006)

- Lead candidate – General election
  - Pim Fortuyn – 2002
  - Mat Herben – 2003
  - Olaf Stuger – 2006
- Lead candidate – Senate election
  - Bob Smalhout – 2003

== See also ==
- Party for Freedom (PVV) - Party founded in 2006.
- Forum for Democracy (FvD) – Party founded in 2016
- JA21 – Offshoot of FvD founded by Eerdmans in 2021
