= Bob Smalhout =

Dutch anesthesiologist, columnist, and opinion journalist (1927–2015)

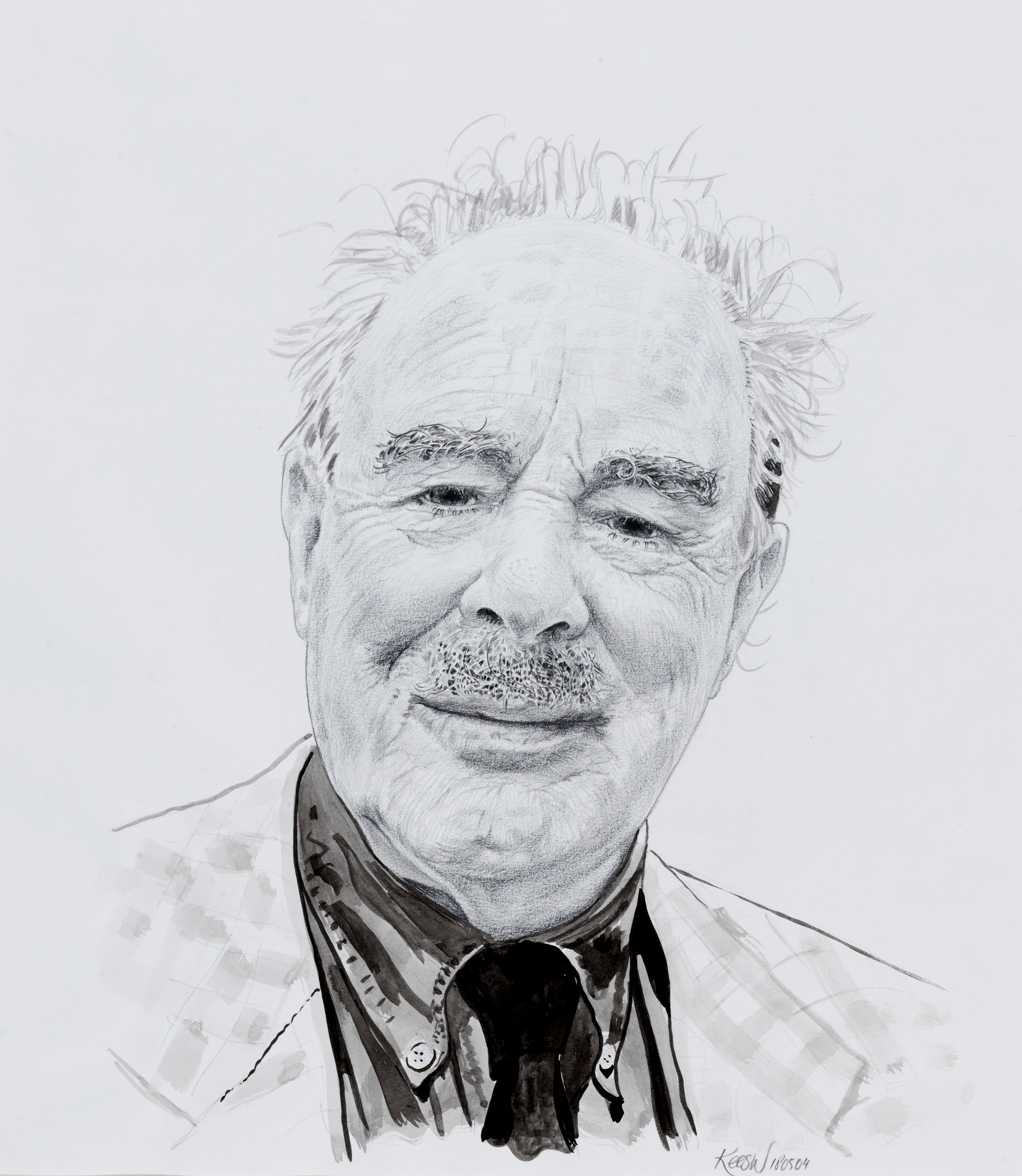
- Born: 13 October 1927; Amsterdam, Netherlands
- Died: 2 July 2015 (aged 87); Bosch en Duin, Netherlands
- Education: University of Amsterdam (Doctor of Medicine, Doctor of Philosophy)
- Occupations: Physician; Author; Columnist; Television presenter Teacher professor
- Political party: Pim Fortuyn List (2002–2003)
- Spouse(s): Mieke Smalhout-van der Wees (1955–2010; her death); Nanda van der Zee (2011–2014; her death)

Bob Smalhout (13 October 1927 – 2 July 2015) was a Dutch physician, professor and author. Smalhout, an anesthesiologist, worked at the Utrecht Academic Hospital and the Utrecht University. Smalhout was the Lijsttrekker (top candidate) for the Pim Fortuyn List (LPF) party for the Dutch Senate election of 2003. Smalhout was the son of Elias Smalhout and came from a Reform Judaism family.
