= Wien van den Brink =

Dutch politician

- In office 2002–2006

Personal details
- Born: 31 May 1945 Putten
- Died: 10 January 2010 (aged 64)
- Party: Lijst Pim Fortuyn
- Occupation: Politician, farmer, union leader

Windeld (Wien) van den Brink (31 May 1945 – 10 January 2010) was a Dutch politician, farmer and union leader. From 2002 to 2006, he was a member of the House of Representatives of the Netherlands for the Lijst Pim Fortuyn.

Before entering politics, van den Brink was a farmer and chairman of a farmer's union. In 2002, he joined the Livable Netherlands party and was due to stand as a candidate for LN in the 2002 Dutch general election, however he switched his affiliation to the Pim Fortuyn List after Pim Fortuyn himself was sacked as party leader of the LN. Van den Brink was subsequently elected to parliament for the LPF.

When the rest of the LPF parliamentary faction declared itself independent from the party, van den Brink remained attached to the LPF. He retired from the House of Representatives before the 2006 election. In the Dutch municipal elections of 2006, van den Brink was elected alderman and deputy mayor in Putten as an independent candidate and held the position in coalition with the Christian Democratic Appeal and the Reformed Political Party but resigned from the position a year later.

Unusually, van den Brink had a chance encounter with Pim Fortuyn's killer Volkert van der Graaf before Fortuyn's assassination in May 2002, as van der Graaf had protested against an expansion of van den Brink's farm in Putten. When the identity of Fortuyn's murderer was publicly revealed, van den Brink referred to van der Graaf as a "fundamentalist" and a "bastard."
