= Herman Heinsbroek =

Dutch politician (born 1951)

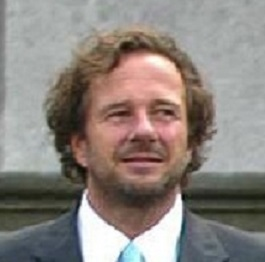
- Heinsbroek in 2002

Minister of Economic Affairs
- In office 22 July 2002 – 16 October 2002
- Prime Minister: Jan Peter Balkenende
- Preceded by: Annemarie Jorritsma
- Succeeded by: Hans Hoogervorst

Personal details
- Born: Hermanus Philippus Johannes Bernardus Heinsbroek; 19 October 1951 (age 74) Schiedam, Netherlands
- Party: Pim Fortuyn List (2002); List New Politics (2002–2003)
- Occupation: Politician, businessman, author

Hermanus Philippus Johannes Bernardus Heinsbroek (born 12 January 1951) is a Dutch entrepreneur, media commentator, author and former politician who briefly served as Minister of Economic Affairs in 2002 in the first Balkenende cabinet. He was a member of the Pim Fortuyn List (LPF) party from August to October 2002, when he co-founded a new party, List New Politics (Lijst Nieuwe Politiek – LNP), with Harry Wijnschenk. Their aim was to take part in the 2003 general election, although LNP eventually failed to find enough candidates to present a list. It was disbanded before the Electoral Council in February 2003.

== Personal life ==
Heinsbroek was born in Schiedam and grew up in Rotterdam. His father was the General Manager of the Blankenheim & Nolet gin distillery. Heinsbroek studied business and civil law at the Erasmus University, graduating in 1975.

He started out as a diplomat in the Ministry of Foreign Affairs. After a brief time there, he left to work at CBS Records. In 1979 he was hired as Managing Director of Arcade Records Benelux. Through a management buy-out in 1984 he acquired the majority of the shares of the company. Over the years he built it into one of the largest independent players in the European music business, with affiliates in 11 countries plus the US, called The Arcade Entertainment Group. The company also owned Indisc, CNR Music, music retail chain The Music Store, Vanguard Classics, Arcade Music Publishing, Arcade Video, Radio 10 Gold, Concert Radio, Love Radio and music television station TMF. In 1995 Arcade was sold to Wegener N.V. He was also involved in founding the dating website ArcadeDating.

Heinsbroek is known as a collector and connaisseur of Contemporary Art, in particular Chinese Art.

He is a member of the supervisory board of Belinco N.V.

Since 2006, he has co-presented the political debate show Recht door Zee on Katholieke Radio Omroep and KRO-NCRV.

His first novel, a thriller entitled Risky Game, was published in 2015.

== Political career ==
Heinsbroek became a member of the Pim Fortuyn List (LPF) at the encouragement of Ferry Hoogendijk who was his neighbour at the time as the LPF was searching for candidates to stand in the upcoming 2002 election. He served in the first Balkenende cabinet as Minister of Economic Affairs, representing the LPF. His resignation, which came after continued public battle with fellow LPF member and Minister of Health, Welfare and Sport Eduard Bomhoff. Heinsbroek was one of the reasons for the collapse of the cabinet. Following the collapse, 2002, Heinsbroek founded his own party, the List of New Politics (LNP), initially with the intention of participating in the parliamentary elections on 22 January 2003. The LNP's program included important elements from the LPF's manifesto and contained former LPF MPs Harry Wijnschenk and Fred Schonewille. However, the idea was abandoned after Heinsbroek announced that he could not find enough suitable candidates to participate in the elections.

Heinsbroek was briefly associated with the Democratic Political Turning Point (DPK) party in 2012 as an economic spokesman.
