= Aart Jan de Geus =

Dutch politician and businessman

Deputy Secretary-General of the OECD
- In office 7 March 2007 – 31 August 2011
- Secretary-General: José Ángel Gurría
- Preceded by: Unknown
- Succeeded by: Yves Leterme

Minister of Health, Welfare and Sport
- In office 16 October 2002 – 27 May 2003
- Prime Minister: Jan Peter Balkenende
- Preceded by: Eduard Bomhoff
- Succeeded by: Hans Hoogervorst

Minister of Social Affairs and Employment
- In office 22 July 2002 – 22 February 2007
- Prime Minister: Jan Peter Balkenende
- Preceded by: Willem Vermeend
- Succeeded by: Piet Hein Donner

Member of the Social and Economic Council
- In office 1 September 1988 – 31 March 1998

Personal details
- Born: Aart Jan de Geus; 28 July 1955 (age 71) Doorn, Netherlands
- Party: Christian Democratic Appeal (from 1980)
- Other political affiliations: Anti-Revolutionary Party (until 1980)
- Children: 3 children
- Education: Utrecht University (Bachelor of Law); Erasmus University Rotterdam, Master of Law)
- Occupation: Politician · Civil servant · Jurist · Trade Union leader · Accountant · Political consultant · Management consultant · Businessman · Corporate director · Nonprofit director · Lobbyist

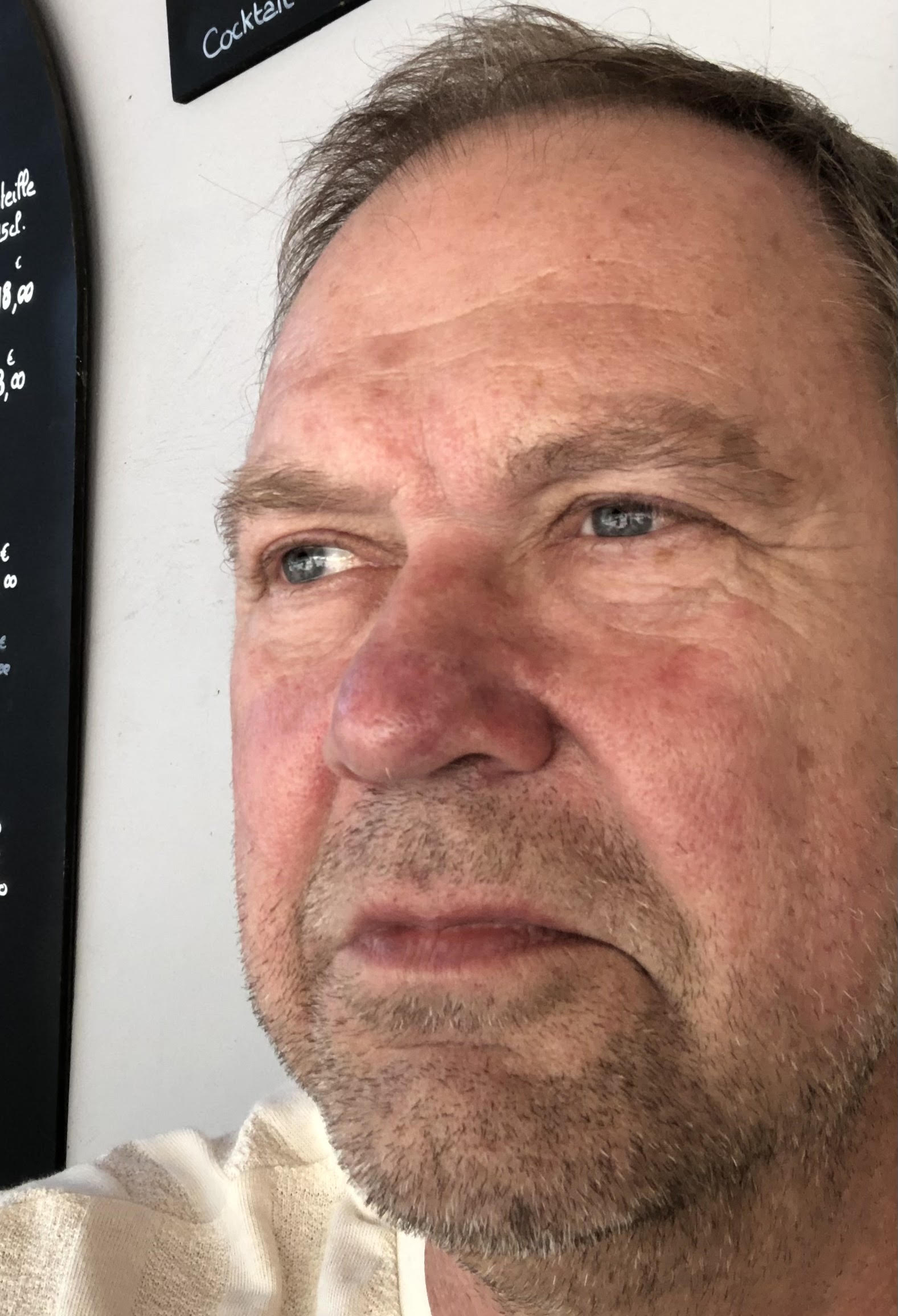
Aart Jan de Geus in 2022

Aart Jan de Geus (born 28 July 1955) is a retired Dutch politician of the Christian Democratic Appeal (CDA) party and businessman. He served as Minister of Labor and Social Affairs from 2002 to 2007. Then he worked as Deputy Secretary-General for the OECD. From 2012 to 2019, De Geus was Chairman and CEO of the Bertelsmann Stiftung. From January 2020 to 2023, he was Chairman of the Goldschmeding Foundation for People, Work and Economy.

== Education ==
De Geus began studying law at the Utrecht University and completed his education at Erasmus University Rotterdam, where the law program had a more social-economic orientation. After receiving his Master of Laws in 1980, he did post-graduate studies in labor law at Radboud University Nijmegen.

== Career ==
In 1980, de Geus became a lawyer for the industrial trade union of the Christelijk Nationaal Vakverbond (CNV). In subsequent years he rose through the organization, eventually joining the board of directors. In 1988, he joined the board of the national confederation CNV and was appointed its deputy chairman in 1993. His responsibilities in this position included social security, pensions, health and employment. He was also a member of the Socioeconomic Advisory Council, the Dutch government’s highest body for economic and social policy issues, one that is anchored in the constitution and whose members are appointed by the crown.

In 1998, De Geus became a partner at the corporate consultancy Boer & Croon in Amsterdam. There he worked on projects relating to the welfare state for both public and private institutions. He also joined the supervisory board of the Academic Hospital of Maastricht, the advisory council of the Association of Dutch Health Insurers, and the Council of Churches where he was responsible for social policy issues.

=== Public office ===
In the mid-1970s, De Geus joined the youth organization of the Dutch ARP (Anti-Revolutionary Party), a predecessor of the CDA. Through the years he held various positions in both parties. In 2002, Jan Peter Balkenende appointed de Geus as minister of social affairs and employment (first Balkenende cabinet). He also served as health minister for eight months. He was a member of the Dutch government until 2007 (second and third Balkenende cabinets).

While in office, De Geus achieved comprehensive social policy reforms making the country's social security system more sustainable and including more people in the labor market. For example, he restructured the disability insurance system and the schemes for early retirement. He also included local-level governments in the funding structure for social assistance programs. He was considered a supporter of the country's polder model, an approach that brings together employers, trade unions and government experts to negotiate wages and working conditions. Despite his earlier activities for the CNV trade union confederation, his relationship with the country's trade unions proved difficult. In 2004, he withstood a vote of no confidence brought by the opposition Social Democratic, Socialist and Green parties.

In 2007, de Geus was appointed Deputy Secretary-General of the OECD. In this role he advanced a number of causes including environmentally friendly economic growth. He also led the project Making Reform Happen, about the political economy of welfare state reforms. He also criticized the division present in the German job market.

=== Bertelsmann Stiftung ===
In 2011, the Bertelsmann Stiftung appointed de Geus to its executive board. In 2012, he became the board's chairman when Gunter Thielen retired. The Bertelsmann Stiftung thus increased its independence from the Mohn family, owners of the Bertelsmann group. As chairman, de Geus launched the initiative to internationalize the foundation's activities. With his team and international partners, he developed the global SDG-index, measuring and comparing progress on the Sustainable Development Goals at national levels.

=== Other functions ===
From 2014 to 2022, De Geus chaired the Supervisory Board of the Netherlands-based Triodos Bank, a leading sustainability bank with offices in Belgium, Germany, the UK and Spain. Since 2023, He is Chairman of the Academic Institute for CDA, and acting Chairman of College van Toezicht Advocatuur, the Supervirsory Authority over the Dutch Bar. Since 2022, De Geus teaches Dynamics of the Welfare State at the Paris School of International Affairs (affiliated to the SciencesPo University).

== Publications ==
- Aart De Geus; Eric Thode; Christiane Weidenfeld (2016). Europe Reforms Labour Market – Leaders' Perspectives. Berlin: Walter de Gruyter. ISBN 978-3-11-036577-1.

== Decorations ==
Honours
Ribbon bar	Honour	Country	Date	Comment
	Officer of the Order of Orange-Nassau	Netherlands	11 April 2007	

Political offices
Preceded by Willem Vermeend	Minister of Social Affairs and Employment; 2002–2007	Succeeded by Piet Hein Donner
Preceded by Eduard Bomhoff	Minister of Health, Welfare and Sport; 2002–2003	Succeeded by Hans Hoogervorst
Diplomatic posts
Unknown	Deputy Secretary-General of the OECD; 2007–2011	Succeeded by Yves Leterme
Business positions
Unknown	Chairman of the Supervisory board of the Triodos Bank; 2014–present	Incumbent
Non-profit organization positions
Preceded by Gunter Thielen	Chairman and CEO of the Bertelsmann Stiftung; 2012–2019	Succeeded by Ralph Heck
Unknown	Chairman and CEO of the Goldschmeding Foundation; 2020–present	Incumbent
