= Eduard Bomhoff =

Dutch economist and politician

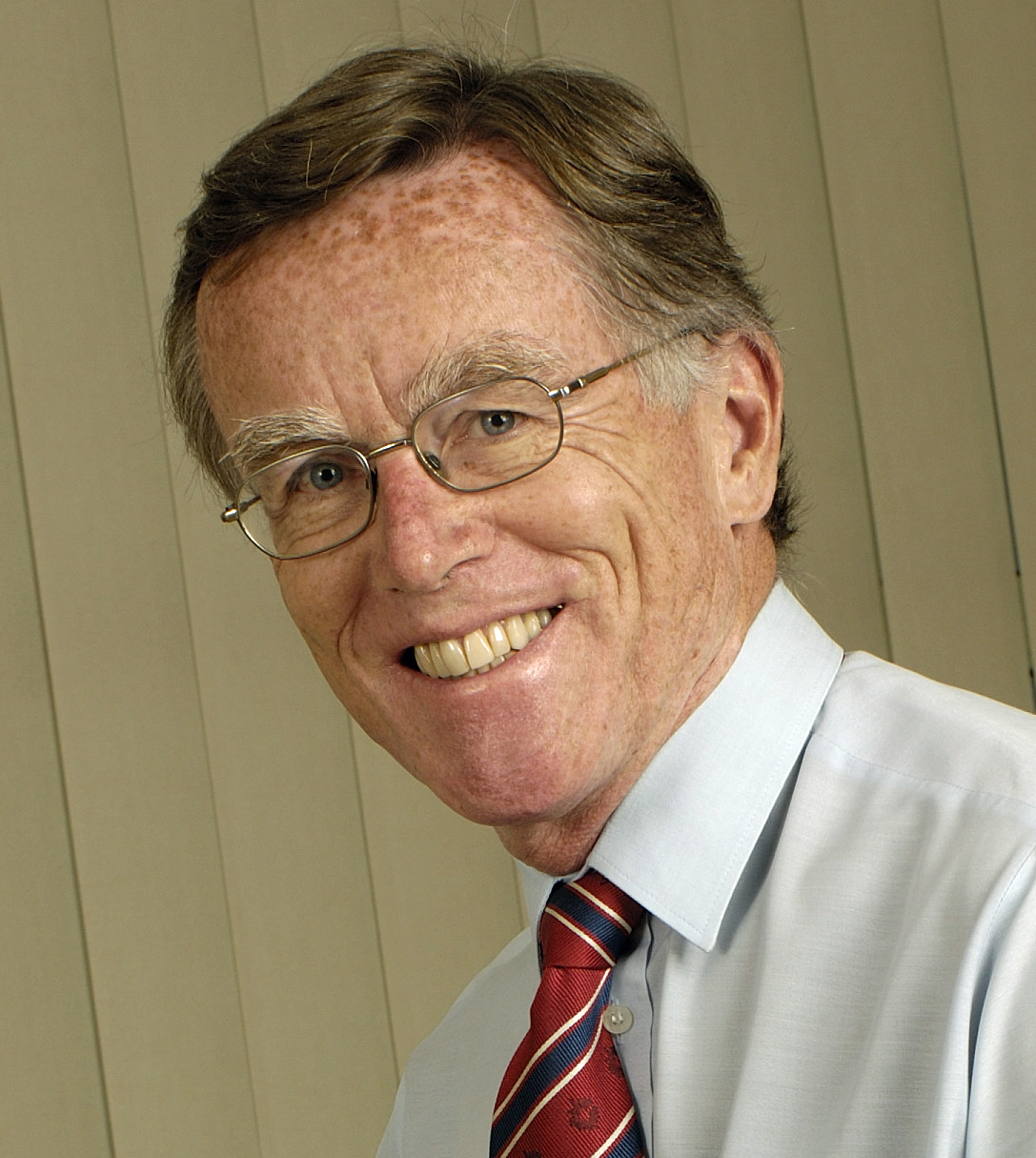
- Bomhoff in 2006

Deputy Prime Minister of the Netherlands
- In office 22 July 2002 – 16 October 2002 Serving with Johan Remkes
- Prime Minister: Jan Peter Balkenende
- Preceded by: Annemarie Jorritsma; Els Borst
- Succeeded by: Roelf de Boer

Minister of Health, Welfare and Sport
- In office 22 July 2002 – 16 October 2002
- Prime Minister: Jan Peter Balkenende
- Preceded by: Els Borst
- Succeeded by: Aart Jan de Geus

Personal details
- Born: Eduard Jan Bomhoff; 30 September 1944 (age 81) Amsterdam, Netherlands
- Party: Independent (from 2003)
- Other political affiliations: Labour Party (1972–2002); Pim Fortuyn List (2002–2003)
- Spouse: Janneke Bomhoff (m. 1966)
- Children: 2 children
- Education: Leiden University (Bachelor of Economics, Master of Economics); Erasmus University Rotterdam (Doctor of Philosophy)
- Occupation: Economist · Researcher · Academic administrator · Columnist · Author · Professor

Eduard Jan Bomhoff (born 30 September 1944) is a Dutch economist, professor and retired politician who served as Deputy Prime Minister and Minister of Health, Welfare and Sport for the Pim Fortuyn List (LPF) in the first Balkenende cabinet from 22 July 2002 until 16 October 2002. He since worked as an economics professor at the Monash University Malaysia Campus in Kuala Lumpur.

== Early life ==
Eduard Jan Bomhoff was born on 30 September 1944 in Amsterdam in an Old Catholic family as the son of Jacobus Gerardus Bomhoff a Minister and professor of literature and Riet van Rhijn. The family moved in 1957 to Leiden. His political background has been described as coming from a 'red' Leiden family. Bomhoff attended the Stedelijk Gymnasium Leiden and went to Leiden University to study mathematics. After earning a Master of Economics there he received the Doctor of Philosophy degree in economics from the Erasmus University Rotterdam in 1979. Bomhoff worked as a lecturer in monetary policy there. He earned the rank of professor in 1981, and served as director of the Rochester-Erasmus Executive Master of Business Administration program from 1986 to 1989. He later served as a professor of finance at the Nyenrode Business Universiteit. In addition to his academic career, Bomhoff founded the NYFER institute in 1995, an economic research institute designed as an alternative to the official Bureau for Economic Policy Analysis. Bomhoff was also a columnist for the NRC Handelsblad from 1989 until 2002.

Bomhoff became a member of the Labor Party (PvdA) in 1972 but became a critic of the party in his columns and argued there was too much of a gap between its leaders and supporters.

== Politics ==
=== Deputy Prime Minister ===
Bomhoff served as Deputy Prime Minister and Minister of Health, Welfare and Sport in the first Balkenende cabinet from 22 July 2002 to his resignation on 16 October of that year. Although Bomhoff had been a member of the Labour Party until the election, he joined the Pim Fortuyn List (LPF) and served in the cabinet on behalf of the party. The move was considered remarkable due to Bomhoff's political background but Bomboff later stated his reason to accept the position on behalf of the LPF was due to his admiration for Pim Fortuyn's criticism of "regent" mentality of Dutch politics at the time. In government, he pressed for more healthcare spending and used the threat of resignation to argue for a considerably higher healthcare budget in the 2003 national budget.

=== Resignation ===
During his time in the cabinet, Bomhoff came under attack from the Minister of Economic Affairs, Herman Heinsbroek, a fellow member of the LPF. Heinsbroek stated publicly that Bomhoff was a failure as Deputy Prime Minister and started testing the waters for a new political party. On the suggestion by then VVD leader Gerrit Zalm, LPF minister Roelf de Boer and his supporters pressed for the resignation of Heinsbroek and Bomhoff. The VVD also convinced the other LPF ministers that they could replace both Bomhoff and Heinsbroek. Bomhoff told his colleagues that this would not work and predicted the other parties in the cabinet would not allow the LPF to replace them, but they forced him and Heinsbroek to resign anyway. As predicted by Bomhoff and several major newspapers, the coalition partners then did not allow the LPF to put forward two new ministers, but decided to immediately dissolve parliament and call for new elections. LPF never returned to the Dutch cabinet.

== After politics ==
Bomhoff returned to academia after leaving the government, accepting positions as a professor first at the University of Bahrain and later at the University of Nottingham. He was also the dean of the social sciences faculty at the University of Nottingham Malaysia. He then served as a professor of Economics in Monash University's Sunway Campus in Malaysia, in the School of Business before retiring from academic work in 2023. Bomhoff has written a book about his time in government, titled Blinde Ambitie (Blind Ambition) which remains the only detailed book on the Balkenende I cabinet. He has been the Malaysian principal researcher for the World Values Survey and has published his recent research in the Journal of Cross-Cultural Psychology and in Public Choice and worked as an advisor to the Bank of Japan. Since 2020, he has worked as a columnist for the website and podcast Wynia's Week founded by Dutch journalist Syp Wynia.

== Personal ==
Bomhoff belongs to the Old Catholic Church but considers his religion a private matter. His religious views are quite orthodox. He is married since 1976 and has two children.

Political offices
Preceded by Annemarie Jorritsma	Deputy Prime Minister; 2002; With: Johan Remkes	Succeeded by Roelf de Boer
Preceded by Els Borst	Deputy Prime Minister; 2002; With: Johan Remkes	Succeeded by Roelf de Boer
Preceded by Els Borst	Minister of Health, Welfare and Sport; 2002	Succeeded by Aart Jan de Geus
