= Mat Herben =

Dutch politician (born 1952)

Leader of the Pim Fortuyn List in the House of Representatives
- In office 17 August 2006 – 30 November 2006
- Preceded by: Gerard van As
- Succeeded by: Party disbanded
- In office 16 October 2002 – 5 October 2004
- Preceded by: Harry Wijnschenk
- Succeeded by: Gerard van As
- In office 16 May 2002 – 28 August 2002
- Preceded by: Position established
- Succeeded by: Harry Wijnschenk

Member of the House of Representatives
- In office 23 May 2002 – 30 November 2006

Personal details
- Born: Mathieu Herben; 15 July 1952 (age 73) The Hague, Netherlands
- Party: Pim Fortuyn List (2002–2004; 2004–2006); People's Party for Freedom and Democracy (2008–2017)
- Occupation: Politician; Civil servant
- Website: Official site

Mathieu "Mat" Herben (born 15 July 1952) is a Dutch journalist, civil servant and retired politician of the now-dissolved Pim Fortuyn List (LPF) party, who served thrice as LPF party leader and parliamentary leader between 2002 and 2006.

== Biography ==
=== Early career ===
Mat Herben was born in The Hague to a Dutch father while his mother was of Polish origin. By his own admission, Herben wanted to join the Royal Netherlands Air Force after leaving school but was rejected because he was considered susceptible to blackmail because of his Polish mother. Instead, he began working as a claims correspondent for the NN Group. From 1977 to 1987 he was a civil servant at the Dutch Ministry of Defence before taking up journalism. From 1987 to 1990 he was the editor of the Catholic family magazine Manna, and in the 1990s he was also the editor of Sta-Vast, the magazine published by the right-wing organization Oud-Strijders Legioen. From 1990 to 1995 he wrote reviews on classical music and publications about popular medical and social topics for various publications. From 1990 to 2002 he was a public relations official and chief editor of diverse magazines and worked again at the Dutch Ministry of Defence.

=== Political work ===
Herben first became active in politics in 1993 when he founded the Leefbaar Linschoten party to help preserve an orchard in Linschoten. In 2002, he joined the newly established Livable Netherlands party where he met Pim Fortuyn and was included on the LN's list of candidates for the 2002 general election. On 20 February 2002, ten days after Livable Netherlands had dismissed Fortuyn as leader, Herben contacted Fortuyn again who at the time was setting up the Pim Fortuyn List (LPF) party and switched his candidacy to the LPF's list.

Following the assassination of Fortuyn in May 2002, the LPF elected him as its new leader after the party turned out in force in the parliamentary elections. From May 2002 he sat as a member of LPF's parliamentary party in the House of Representatives of the Staten-Generaal. In the House of Representatives, Herben dealt with general affairs, defense matters, international security and aviation. He was also vice-chairman of the standing House Committee for Defense. In 2004, Herben served as the fraction leader as well as the chairman of the LPF. In the elections held on 22 January 2003 he was the lead candidate of the party. Between March and May 2002 he was spokesman of the Lijst Pim Fortuyn and from May 2002 until October 2004 chairman of this party. In November 2006, he retired as a member of the House of Representatives of the Netherlands.

In parliament, Herben campaigned against female genital mutilation, and in accordance to Fortuyn's policy, called for the practice to be banned. In November 2003 Prime Minister Balkenende and Minister of Justice Piet Hein Donner called for a limit on the number of satires about the Dutch royal family. During the debate on the matter, Herben put on a red clown nose before speaking at the interruption microphone in parliament to ask whether this would violate the proposed rules. Balkenende then complimented him on his nose. One of his last activities in parliament involved campaigning to limit the influence of the European Union on Dutch regulations. In November 2006 Herben submitted a private member's bill to end all EU influence together on Dutch domestic regulation with Reformed Political Party politician Kees van der Staaij, but when the LPF lost all representation in parliament during the 2006 Dutch general election, Van der Staaij took on this defense. In June 2009 the vote in the House of Representatives was postponed, but in September 2015 the House of Representatives approved this. The treatment in the Senate was then halted for two years. On 9 April 2019, the Senate rejected this proposal, after thirteen years.

Between 2005 and 2009, Herben returned to journalism as an author for STA-VAST, the magazine of the Dutch right-wing conservative organization Oud-Strijders Legioen.

In 2018, Herben made a small return to politics in which he was elected as a councilor for the Lokaal Montfoort party. He was re-elected for another term in 2022.

== Personal life ==
Herben now lives in Linschoten. He is interested in defence, international security and aviation. He has been married since 1975 and has one daughter. He is a Catholic and also a Freemason.

== Publications ==
- "De Luchtstrijdkrachten van het Warschaupact en neutraal Europa" (1982)
- "Vijftig jaar vrijmetselarij"
- "Vrij Denken – over religie, politiek en vrijmetselarij" (2005)

Party political offices
Preceded by Pim Fortuyn	Party leader Pim Fortuyn List; 2002	Succeeded by Harry Wijnschenk
First	Parliamentary leader – LPF; House of Representatives; 2002	Succeeded by Harry Wijnschenk
Preceded by Harry Wijnschenk	Party leader Pim Fortuyn List; 2002–2004	Succeeded by Gerard van As
Preceded by Harry Wijnschenk	Parliamentary leader – LPF; House of Representatives; 2002–2004	Succeeded by Gerard van As
Preceded by Gerard van As	Party leader Pim Fortuyn List; 2006	Party disbanded
Preceded by Gerard van As	Parliamentary leader – LPF; House of Representatives; 2006	Party disbanded
