= Gerard van As =

Dutch politician (born 1944)

Leader of the Pim Fortuyn List in the House of Representatives
- In office 5 October 2004 – 17 August 2006
- Preceded by: Mat Herben
- Succeeded by: Mat Herben

Member of the House of Representatives
- In office 23 May 2002 – 12 September 2006

Personal details
- Born: Gerard Pieter van As; 12 November 1944 (age 81) Gouda, Netherlands
- Party: People's Party for Freedom and Democracy (1976–2001); Pim Fortuyn List (2002–2006); Party for the Netherlands (2006); Nieuw Elan (2009–present)
- Education: Leiden University

Gerard Pieter van As (born 12 November 1944) is a Dutch politician. He was a member of the House of Representatives from 2002 to 2006 for the Pim Fortuyn List (LPF) and served as its parliamentary leader from 2004 to 2006, when he was also party leader.

In 2014 he returned as an alderman in the municipal executive of Alphen aan den Rijn for the local party Nieuw Elan, a position he previously held from 1982 to 1993.

== Career ==
Van As studied law at the Leiden University. He then worked in property law and as a real estate broker.

From 1978 to 1994, he served in the municipal council of Alphen aan den Rijn for the People's Party for Freedom and Democracy (VVD). From 1982 to 1993, he was an alderman in the municipal executive of Alphen aan den Rijn. In 2001, he renounced his VVD party membership, before he joined the Pim Fortuyn List (LPF) in 2002. In the 2002 general election, Van As was elected to Parliament for the LPF. In Parliament, he focused on finance and government expenditure. From 2004 to 2006, he served as party leader and parliamentary leader of the LPF in the House of Representatives.

On 16 August 2006, Van As left the LPF after a conflict with his fellow LPF parliamentarians. He turned down an offer from VVD leader Mark Rutte to rejoin the VVD; he joined the Nawijn Group instead the following day, with the aim of standing as a candidate for Hilbrand Nawijn's Party for the Netherlands (PvN) – which he joined at its foundation on 22 August – in the upcoming general election on 22 November. However, Van As in turn left the PvN on 11 September and retired early from Parliament the following day.

In 2009 he co-founded the local party Nieuw Elan. In 2010 Van As successfully took part in the municipal election in Alphen aan den Rijn for the new local party, before once again becoming an alderman in 2014.
