= Harry Wijnschenk =

Dutch politician (born 1964)

Member of the House of Representatives
- In office 2002–2003

Personal details
- Born: Hartog Hank Richard Wijnschenk; 24 January 1964 (age 62) Amsterdam, Netherlands
- Party: Belang van Nederland (since 2023); Pim Fortuyn List (2002–2003); VVD (before 2002)

Hartog Hank Richard "Harry" Wijnschenk (born 24 January 1964 in Amsterdam) is a former Dutch politician. From 2002 to 2003 he was an MP for the Pim Fortuyn List (LPF), and later for the Wijnschenk Group. He briefly served as leader of the LPF in 2002.

== Biography ==
Wijnschenk has a Jewish background. He worked as a magazine editor and started his political career as an executive for the local branch of the People's Party for Freedom and Democracy (VVD) in his hometown of Almere. Later he joined the LPF and served as a politician in parliament after taking over fellow LPF MP André Peperkoorn's seat who resigned before he was sworn in.

In August 2002, Wijnschenk was elected leader of the LPF, replacing Mat Herben who had resigned due to infighting within the party. During his leadership, he attempted tot get rid of the arguing party members Cor Eberhard and Winny de Jong from the LPF group. The two left but kept their seats by continuing as a group Groep De Jong. In September 2002, Wijnschenk proposed to appoint Minister of Economic Affairs Herman Heinsbroek as party leader and deputy prime minister.

In October 2002, Herben returned as LPF leader. The following month Wijnschenk announced that he would continue as an independent member of parliament for the short remaining period under the name of Groep Wijnschenk. He later founded a new political party with Heinsbroek called the List New Politics. In the end the party decided not to take part in the 2003 Dutch general election and disbanded.

In 2023, Wijnschenk announced a return to politics as a member of the Belang van Nederland party and was appointed the party's leader in the Flevoland region. He contested a seat for the Senate on behalf of the party and was not elected.

== Electoral history ==
Electoral history of Harry Wijnschenk
Year	Body	Party	Pos.	Votes	Result		Ref.
Year	Body	Party	Pos.	Votes	Party seats	Individual	Ref.
2002	House of Representatives	Pim Fortuyn List	28	877	26	Lost (Note: Wijnschenk did receive a seat in the body due to André Peperkoorn declining his.)	
2023	House of Representatives	Belang van Nederland	14	81	0	Lost	
