= List of candidates in the 2009 European Parliament election in the Netherlands =

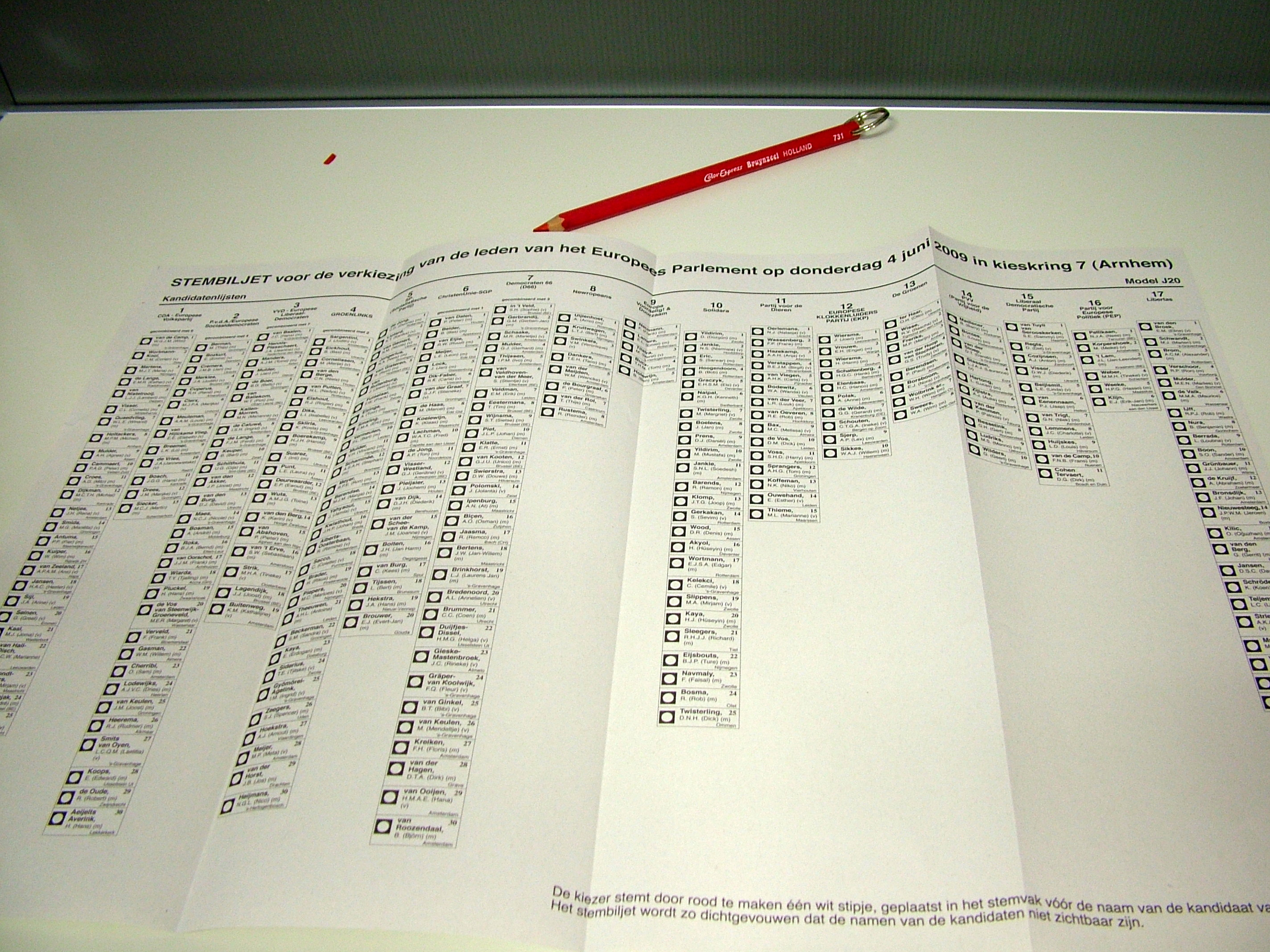
Voting ballot

The 2009 European Parliament election for the election of the delegation from the Netherlands was held on 4 June 2009. This is the 7th time the elections have been held for the European elections in the Netherlands.

== Numbering of the candidates list ==
The official order and names of candidate lists:

Candidate lists for the European Parliament election in the Netherlands
2009
Lists
List		English translation	List name (Dutch)
1	list	CDA - European People's Party	CDA – Europese Volkspartij
2	list	P.v.d.A./European Social Democrats	P.v.d.A./Europese Sociaaldemocraten
3	list	VVD - European Liberal-Democrats	VVD – Europese Liberaal-Democraten
4	list	GreenLeft	Groenlinks
5	list	SP (Socialist Party)	SP (Socialistische Partij)
6	list	Christian Union-SGP	ChristenUnie–SGP
7	list	Democrats 66 (D66)	Democraten 66 (D66)
8	list	Newropeans	
9	list	Europe Cheap! & Sustainable	Europa Voordelig! & Duurzaam
10	list	Solidara	
11	list	Party for the Animals	Partij voor de Dieren
12	list	European Whistleblower Party (EKP)	Europese Klokkenluiders Partij (EKP)
13	list	The Greens	De Groenen
14	list	PVV (Party for Freedom)	PVV (Partij voor de Vrijheid)
15	list	Liberal Democratic Party	Liberaal Democratische Partij
16	list	Party for European politics (PEP)	Partij voor Europese Politiek (PEP)
17	list	Libertas	

== CDA - European People's Party ==
Candidate list for the Christian Democratic Appeal
Number	Candidate	Votes	Result
1	Wim van de Camp	579,775	Elected
2	Corien Wortmann-Kool	48,270	Elected
3	Maria Martens	38,781	Elected
4	Esther de Lange	43,406	Elected
5	Lambert van Nistelrooij	41,846	Elected
6	Cornelis Visser	13,914	
7	Winand Quaedvlieg	2,190	
8	Michiel Holtackers	4,126	
9	Agnes Mulder	15,859	
10	Peter Cammaert	5,285	
11	Mito Croes	17,975	
12	Michiel Dijkman	5,762	
13	Rena Netjes	4,305	
14	Mariëlla Smids	3,127	
15	Pier Antuma	2,439	
16	Wim Kuiper	892	
17	Ans van Zeeland	3,403	
18	Hester Jansen	919	
19	Arine Sijl	1,118	
20	Greet Seinen	1,719	
21	Joma Kaal	714	
22	Marianne van Hall-Disch	3,255	
23	Mirjam Depondt-Olivers	2,553	
24	André Kolodziejak	1,212	
25	Ria Oomen-Ruijten	70,388	Elected
Total		913,233	

== P.v.d.A./European Social Democrats ==
Candidate list for the Labour Party
Number	Candidate	Votes	Result
1	Thijs Berman	372,060	Elected
2	Emine Bozkurt	66,385	Elected
3	Jan Cremers	13,606	
4	Judith Merkies	18,553	Elected
5	René Cuperus	7,209	
6	Marijke Clerx	13,828	
7	Louis Meuleman	5,038	
8	Elsbeth van Hijlckama Vlieg	5,295	
9	Lo Breemer	7,183	
10	Jannewietske de Vries	11,034	
11	Hans Bosch	11,255	
12	Marijke Drees	13,972	
13	Martin Siecker	3,273	
Total		548,691	

== VVD - European Liberal-Democrats ==
Candidate list for the People's Party for Freedom and Democracy
Number	Candidate	Votes	Result
1	Hans van Baalen	367,796	Elected
2	Jeanine Hennis-Plasschaert	52,184	Elected
3	Toine Manders	34,973	Elected
4	Jan Mulder	12,884	Replacement
5	Betty de Boer	10,234	
6	Pim van Ballekom	1,517	
7	Marianne Kallen-Morren	3,698	
8	Ingrid de Caluwé	4,595	
9	Ferdi de Lange	1,380	
10	Bart Keuper	1,991	
11	Gijs Schilthuis	666	
12	Joost van den Akker	4,167	
13	David van den Burg	1,394	
14	Nicole Maes	1,648	
15	André Bosman	1,685	
16	Bernd Roks	1,596	
17	Frank van Oorschot	683	
18	Tjalling Wiarda	721	
19	Hans Pluckel	640	
20	Margaret de Vos van Steenwijk-Groeneveld	2,348	
21	Frank Verveld	2,023	
22	Willem Gasman	747	
23	Sam Cherribi	558	
24	Dries Lodewijks	1,574	
25	Joost van Keulen	704	
26	Rudmer Heerema	1,055	
27	Laetitia Smits van Oyen	1,825	
28	Edward Knoops	491	
29	Robert de Oude	705	
30	Hans Aeijelts Averink	2,161	
Total		518,643	

== GreenLeft ==
Candidate list for GreenLeft
Number	Candidate	Votes	Result
1	Judith Sargentini	321,744	Elected
2	Bas Eickhout	13,782	Elected
3	Marije Cornelissen	14,486	Elected
4	Niels van den Berge	4,588	
5	Nadya van Putten	9,446	
6	Rogier Elshout	1,972	
7	Isabelle Diks	5,893	
8	Kosta Skliris	1,489	
9	Harold Boerekamp	1,084	
10	Inti Suarez	1,822	
11	Laura Punt	4,976	
12	Ewout Deurwaarder	927	
13	Toine Wuts	3,127	
14	Karin van den Berg	2,075	
15	Pieter van Abshoven	673	
16	Sebastiaan van 't Erve	1,050	
17	Tineke Strik	3,078	
18	Joost Lagendijk	2,634	
19	Kathalijne Buitenweg	9,174	
Total		404,020	

== SP (Socialist Party) ==
Candidates for the European Parliament from the SP
SP candidates 1989	(1989)
SP candidates 1994	(1994)
SP candidates 1999	(1999)
SP candidates 2004	(2004)
SP candidates 2009	(2009)
SP candidates 2014	(2014)
SP candidates 2019	(2019)
SP candidates 2024	(2024)

Candidate list for the Socialist Party
Number	Candidate	Votes	Result
1	Dennis de Jong	194,359	Elected
2	Kartika Liotard	32,426	Elected
3	Nicole van Gemert	23,662	
4	Niels Jongerius	11,481	
5	Rein van Gisteren	2,288	
6	Jessica van Ruitenburg	6,310	
7	Frank Futselaar	2,389	
8	Tuur Elzinga	2,519	
9	Eric Smaling	1,011	
10	Bart Vermeulen	1,449	
11	Vincent Mulder	2,506	
12	Stephan Schaminée	2,421	
13	Ron Meyer	5,513	
14	Marga Berendse	1,649	
15	Jamila Yahyaoui	4,320	
16	Johan Kwisthout	2,777	
17	Remine Alberts-Oosterbaan	2,854	
18	Colette Sacco	1,149	
19	Rikus Brader	908	
20	Marloes Piepers	3,442	
21	Antoine Theeuwen	558	
22	Sandra Beckerman	2,008	
23	Erdogan Kaya	2,326	
24	Tjitske Siderius	1,017	
25	Ingrid Gyömörei-Agelink	1,002	
26	Spencer Zeegers	1,938	
27	Arnout Hoekstra	714	
28	Meta Meijer	1,748	
29	Jos van der Horst	1,808	
30	Nico Heijmans	4,737	
Total		323,269	

== Christian Union-SGP ==
Candidate list for Christian Union-SGP
Number	Candidate	Votes	Result
1	Peter van Dalen	209,947	Elected
2	Bas Belder	53,450	Elected
3	Ruud van Eijle	8,906	
4	Leon Meijer	4,668	
5	Jan Lock	2,687	
6	Carla Dik-Faber	9,921	
7	Stieneke van der Graaf	6,752	
8	Marcel de Haas	1,171	
9	Klaas Koelewijn	2,333	
10	Fred Lachman	1,613	
11	Ton de Jong	937	
12	Gerdine Visser-Westland	988	
13	Jochem Pleijsier	568	
14	Diederik van Dijk	753	
15	Joanne van der Schee-van de Kamp	1,500	
16	Jan Harm Boiten	718	
17	Kees van Burg	464	
18	Bert Tijssen	704	
19	Hans Hekstra	618	
20	Evert-Jan Brouwer	1,842	
Total		310,540	

== Democrats 66 (D66) ==
Candidate list for the Democrats 66
Number	Candidate	Votes	Result
1	Sophie in 't Veld	433,957	Elected
2	Gerben-Jan Gerbrandy	18,107	Elected
3	Marietje Schaake	18,662	Elected
4	Gerhard Mulder	3,933	
5	Ivo Thijssen	3,129	
6	Stientje van Veldhoven	2,759	
7	Erik Veldman	2,329	
8	Tim Eestermans	707	
9	Sietse Wijnsma	661	
10	Johan Piet	1,099	
11	Ernst Klatte	440	
12	Unico van Kooten	604	
13	Douwe Swierstra	935	
14	Jolanta Polomski	1,364	
15	At Ipenburg	2,297	
16	Osman Biçen	6,713	
17	Remco Jaasma	260	
18	Jan-Willem Bertens	1,668	
19	Laurens Jan Brinkhorst	5,655	
20	Annelien Bredenoord	1,357	
21	Coen Brummer	716	
22	Helga Duijfjes-Dissel	770	
23	Rineke Gieske-Mastenbroek	1,911	
24	Fleur Gräper-van Koolwijk	524	
25	Bibi van Ginkel	568	
26	Mendeltje van Keulen	508	
27	Floris Kreiken	255	
28	Dirk van der Hagen	920	
29	Hana van Ooijen	820	
30	Björn van Roozendaal	1,794	
Total		515,422	

== Newropeans ==
Candidate list for the Newropeans
Number	Candidate	Votes	Result
1	Arno Uijlenhoet	11,677	
2	Bart Kruitwagen	1,145	
3	Veronique Swinkels	4,154	
4	Taco Dankers	397	
5	Wencke van der Meijden	1,014	
6	Peter de Bourgraaf	338	
7	Thijs van der Rol	449	
8	Reinder Rustema	666	
9	Wencke van der Meijden	1,014	
Total		19,840	

== Europe Cheap! & Sustainable ==
Candidate list for Europe Cheap! & Sustainable
Number	Candidate	Votes	Result
1	Frank Neumann	2,560	
2	Emiel Lamers	386	
3	Merel Tilstra	1,014	
4	Tom Bucx	171	
5	Ben Holewijn	300	
Total		4,431	

== Solidara ==
Candidate list for Solidara
Number	Candidate	Votes	Result
1	Düzgün Yildirim	3,346	
2	Niermala Jankie	1,817	
3	Sarwar Eric	196	
4	Bob Hoogendoorn	196	
5	Els Graczyk	154	
6	Kenneth Naipal	146	
7	Margriet Twisterling	174	
8	Jan Boelens	46	
9	Daniël Prens	63	
10	Mustafa Yildirim	289	
11	Soedesh Jankie	163	
12	Ramon Barends	58	
13	Joop Klomp	35	
14	Sevim Gerkakan	105	
15	Denis Wood	50	
16	Hüseyin Akyol	165	
17	Edgar Wortmann	22	
18	Cemile Kelekci	101	
19	Mirjam Slippens	36	
20	Hüseyin Kaya	91	
21	Richard Sleegers	49	
22	Ture Eijsbouts	45	
23	Faisal Navmaly	51	
24	Rob Bosma	35	
25	Dick Twisterling	100	
Total		7,533	

== Party for the Animals ==
Candidate list for Party for the Animals
Number	Candidate	Votes	Result
1	Natasja Oerlemans	115,472	
2	Frank Wassenberg	5,191	
3	Anja Hazekamp	2,883	
4	Birgit Verstappen	2,514	
5	Carla van Viegen	1,697	
6	Wanda Bodewitz	797	
7	Luuk van der Veer	1,181	
8	Rob van Oeveren	1,181	
9	Melissa Bax	1,614	
10	Dick de Vos	1,516	
11	Harry Voss	1,054	
12	Tom Sprangers	1,565	
13	Niko Koffeman	621	
14	Esther Ouwehand	2,135	
15	Marianne Thieme	18,314	
Total		157,735	

== European Whistleblower Party (EKP) ==
Candidate list for European Whistleblower Party (EKP)
Number	Candidate	Votes	Result
1	Joeri Wiersma	14,909	
2	Engel Vrouwe	876	
3	Harm Wiersma	969	
4	Henk Schattenberg	419	
5	Hanco Elenbaas	633	
6	Anne Polak	370	
7	Gerard de Wilde	249	
8	Ineke Schouten	2,386	
9	Lex Sjerp	126	
10	Willem Sikkes	511	
Total		21,448	

== The Greens ==
Candidate list for The Greens
Number	Candidate	Votes	Result
1	Otto ter Haar	4,969	
2	Rascha Wisse	1,595	
3	Marijn Freriks	315	
4	Trudy van der Hoop van Slochteren	550	
5	Paul Berendsen	306	
6	Nora Borsboom	354	
7	Wim Wolbrink	151	
8	Wim Sweers	277	
Total		8,517	

== PVV (Party for Freedom) ==
Candidate list for the Party for Freedom
Number	Candidate	Votes	Result
1	Barry Madlener	382,610	Elected
2	Louis Bontes	6,751	Elected
3	Daniël van der Stoep	5,650	Elected
4	Laurence Stassen	17,880	Replacement
5	Lucas Hartong	2,571	Replacement
6	Auke Zijlstra	3,617	Replacement
7	Patricia van der Kammen	12,409	Replacement
8	Gert Besselink	2,964	
9	Menno Ludriks	3,448	
10	Geert Wilders	334,846	Elected, but declined
Total		772,746	

== Liberal Democratic Party ==
Candidate list for Liberal Democratic Party
Number	Candidate	Votes	Result
1	Sammy van Tuyll van Serooskerken	7,583	
2	Det Regts	863	
3	Anton Cozijnsen	154	
4	Diederik Visser	346	
5	Linda Beijlsmit	261	
6	Jaap van Eenennaam	194	
7	Nieke van Trigt	120	
8	Charlotte Lemmens	289	
9	Louis Huijskes	74	
10	Frans van de Camp	469	
11	Dirk Cohen Tervaert	404	
Total		10,757	

== Party for European politics (PEP) ==
Candidate list for Party for European politics (PEP)
Number	Candidate	Votes	Result
1	Nees Pellikaan	1,437	
2	Meike Korpershoek	458	
3	Jan-Leendert 't Lam	78	
4	Tineke Weber	168	
5	Hasso Weeke	73	
6	Erik-Jan Klijn	213	
Total		2,427	

== Libertas ==
Candidate list for Libertas
Number	Candidate	Votes	Result
1	Eline van den Broek	11,765	
2	Marten Schwandt	267	
3	Alexander Brom	242	
4	Ron Verschoor	107	
5	Marlies Mulder	199	
6	Maurice de Valk	83	
7	Rob IJff	106	
8	Benjamin Nura	124	
9	Loubna Berrada	134	
10	Sander Boon	102	
11	Johann Grünbauer	118	
12	Abraham de Kruijf	53	
13	Johan Bronsdijk	59	
14	Jeroen Nieuwesteeg	80	
15	Oğuzhan Kilic	145	
16	Gerrit van den Berg	63	
17	Davy Jansen	105	
18	Koen Schröder	93	
19	Lukas Teijema	50	
20	Alexandra Strieker	48	
21	Madelene Munnik	140	
22	Floor Vreeswijk	173	
23	Anton Brom	47	
24	Hans Besseling	309	
Total		14,612	

== Sources ==
- Minutes Dutch EP election 2009 in .pdf and Dutch
