= List of members of the European Parliament for the Netherlands, 2009–2014 =

Below is a list of the 25 members of the European Parliament for the Netherlands in the 2009 to 2014 session. One person from Party for Freedom entered the Parliament in December 2011, bringing the number of MEPs to 26.

== Party representation ==
=== 2009 election ===
| National party | EP Group | Seats | ± |
|---|---|---|---|
| Christian Democratic Appeal | EPP | 5 / 25 | 2 ▼ |
| Party for Freedom | NI | 4 / 25 | 4 ▲ |
| Labour Party | S&D | 3 / 25 | 4 ▼ |
| People's Party for Freedom and Democracy | ALDE | 3 / 25 | 1 ▼ |
| Democrats 66 | ALDE | 3 / 25 | 2 ▲ |
| GreenLeft | G–EFA | 3 / 25 | 1 ▲ |
| Socialist Party | EUL–NGL | 2 / 25 | 0 |
| ChristianUnion–Reformed Political Party | Various | 2 / 25 | 0 |

=== 2011 ===
After the ratification of the Lisbon Treaty by all member states, the Netherlands got 1 extra seat in parliament.
This extra seat was treated as a remainder seat of the 2009 election.

| National party | EP Group | Seats | ± |
|---|---|---|---|
| Christian Democratic Appeal | EPP | 5 / 26 | 0 |
| Party for Freedom | NI | 5 / 26 | 1 ▲ |
| Labour Party | S&D | 3 / 26 | 0 |
| People's Party for Freedom and Democracy | ALDE | 3 / 26 | 0 |
| Democrats 66 | ALDE | 3 / 26 | 0 |
| GreenLeft | G–EFA | 3 / 26 | 0 |
| Socialist Party | EUL–NGL | 2 / 26 | 0 |
| ChristianUnion–Reformed Political Party | Various | 2 / 26 | 0 |

== List ==
| Name | National party | EP Group | Start date | End date | Ref. |
|---|---|---|---|---|---|
| Hans van Baalen | VVD | ALDE | 14 July 2009 | 1 July 2014 | |
| Bas Belder | SGP | EFD | 14 July 2009 | 1 July 2014 | |
| Thijs Berman | PvdA | S&D | 14 July 2009 | 1 July 2014 | |
| Louis Bontes | PVV | NI | 14 July 2009 | 17 June 2010 (Note: Left to join the House of Representatives) | |
| Emine Bozkurt | PvdA | S&D | 14 July 2009 | 1 July 2014 | |
| Wim van de Camp | CDA | EPP | 14 July 2009 | 1 July 2014 | |
| Marije Cornelissen | GL | G–EFA | 14 July 2009 | 1 July 2014 | |
| Peter van Dalen | CU | ECR | 14 July 2009 | 1 July 2014 | |
| Bas Eickhout | GL | G–EFA | 14 July 2009 | 1 July 2014 | |
| Gerben-Jan Gerbrandy | D66 | ALDE | 14 July 2009 | 1 July 2014 | |
| Lucas Hartong | PVV | NI | 22 June 2010 | 1 July 2014 | |
| Jeanine Hennis-Plasschaert | VVD | ALDE | 14 July 2009 | 17 June 2010 | |
| Dennis de Jong | SP | EUL–NGL | 14 July 2009 | 1 July 2014 | |
| Patricia van der Kammen | PVV | NI | 27 September 2012 | 1 July 2014 | |
| Esther de Lange | CDA | EPP | 14 July 2009 | 1 July 2014 | |
| Kartika Liotard | SP (Note: Until 1 June 2010) | EUL–NGL | 14 July 2009 | 1 July 2014 | |
| Kartika Liotard | Indep. (Note: From 1 June 2010) | EUL–NGL | 14 July 2009 | 1 July 2014 | |
| Barry Madlener | PVV | NI | 14 July 2009 | 20 September 2012 | |
| Toine Manders | VVD (Note: Until 17 October 2013) | ALDE | 14 July 2009 | 1 July 2014 | |
| Toine Manders | Indep. (Note: From 17 October 2013) | ALDE | 14 July 2009 | 1 July 2014 | |
| Judith Merkies | PvdA | S&D | 14 July 2009 | 1 July 2014 | |
| Jan Mulder | VVD | ALDE | 22 June 2010 | 1 July 2014 | |
| Lambert van Nistelrooij | CDA | EPP | 14 July 2009 | 1 July 2014 | |
| Ria Oomen-Ruijten | CDA | EPP | 14 July 2009 | 1 July 2014 | |
| Judith Sargentini | GL | G–EFA | 14 July 2009 | 1 July 2014 | |
| Marietje Schaake | D66 | ALDE | 14 July 2009 | 1 July 2014 | |
| Laurence Stassen | PVV (Note: Until 21 March 2014) | NI | 14 July 2009 | 1 July 2014 | |
| Laurence Stassen | Indep. (Note: From 21 March 2014) | NI | 14 July 2009 | 1 July 2014 | |
| Daniël van der Stoep | PVV | NI | 14 July 2009 | 1 September 2011 | |
| Daniël van der Stoep | Indep. | NI | 15 December 2011 | 1 July 2014 | |
| Sophie in 't Veld | D66 | ALDE | 14 July 2009 | 1 July 2014 | |
| Corien Wortmann-Kool | CDA | EPP | 14 July 2009 | 1 July 2014 | |
| Auke Zijlstra | PVV | NI | 13 September 2011 | 1 July 2014 | |

== See also ==
- 2009 European Parliament election
- 2009 European Parliament election in the Netherlands
- List of members of the European Parliament, 2009–2014
