= List of Socialist Party (Netherlands) members of the European Parliament =

This is a list of all (former) Member of the European Parliament for the Socialist Party (SP) from 1989.

== Seats in the European Parliament ==
Election year	List	# of overall votes	% of overall vote	# of overall seats won	+/–	Notes
1989	List	34,332	0.65 (#8)	0 / 26	new	
1994	List	55,311	1.34 (#8)	0 / 26	0	
1999	List	178,642	5.04 (#7)	1 / 26	1 ▲	
2004	List	332,326	6.97 (#6)	2 / 26	1 ▲	
2009	List	323,269	7.10 (#7)	2 / 25	0	
2014	List	458,079	9.64 (#5)	2 / 26	0	
2019	List	185,224	3.37 (#11)	0 / 26	2 ▼	
2024	List	136,978	2.20 (#13)	0 / 31	0	

== Alphabetical ==
Current members of the European Parliament are in bold. (period is the time they represented the Socialist Party (Netherlands) in the European Parliament.)

European Parliament member	Sex	Period	Photo
Dennis de Jong	Male	from 14 July 2009 till 2 July 2019	
Erik Meijer	Male	from 20 July 1999 till 14 July 2009	
Anne-Marie Mineur	Female	from 1 July 2014 till 2 July 2019	
Kartika Liotard	Female	from 20 July 2004 till 1 June 2010	
