= Christian Democratic Youth Appeal =

Youth wing of a political organization in the Netherlands

Christian Democratic Youth Appeal Christen Democratische Jongeren Appèl
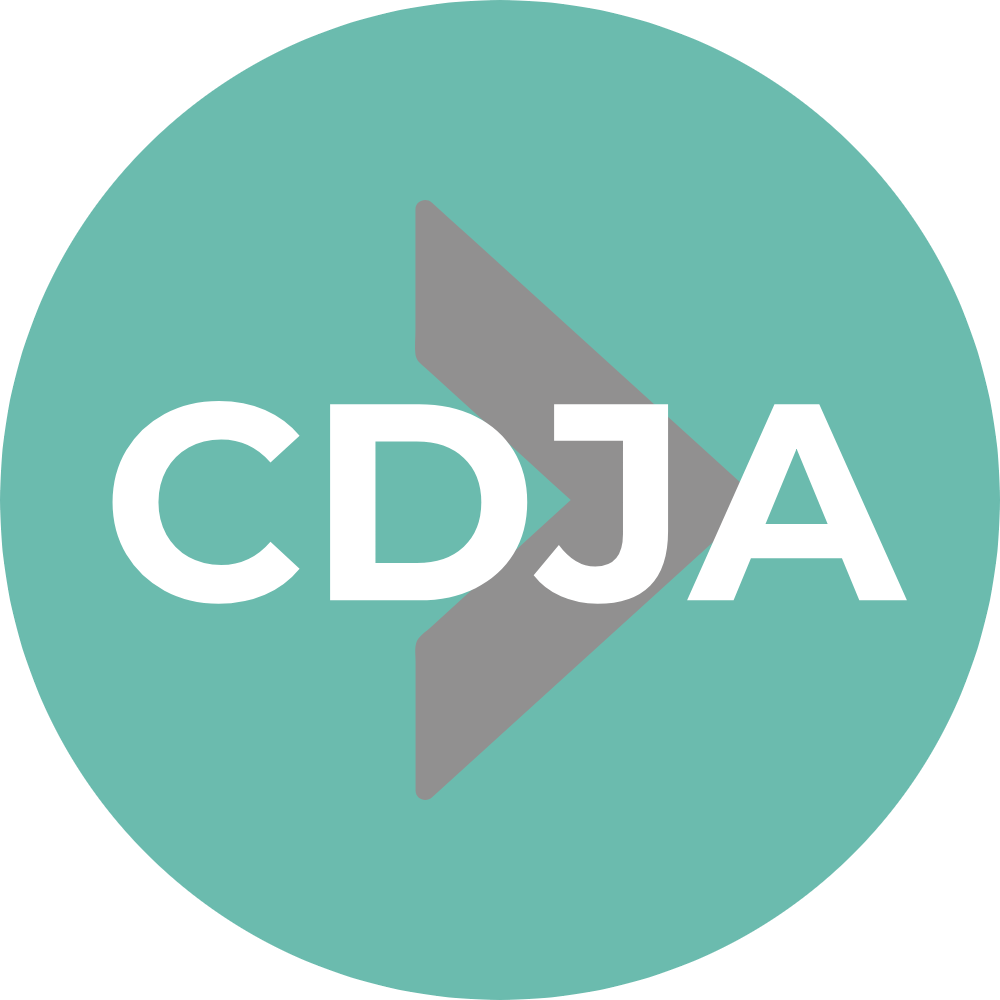
- President: Joanne Sloof
- Vice President: Jorrit Koster
- Founded: 1981; 45 years ago
- Headquarters: Buitenom 18; The Hague, Netherlands
- Ideology: Christian democracy Conservatism
- Colours: Turquoise
- Mother party: Christian Democratic Appeal
- European affiliation: Youth of the European People's Party (YEPP)
- Website: www.cdja.nl

The Christian Democratic Youth Appeal (Dutch: Christen-Democratische Jongeren Appèl), officially abbreviated as CDJA, is the youth organisation of the political party Christian Democratic Appeal in the Netherlands. It came about via the merging of the political youth organisations ARJOS, CHJO and the KVP-jongerenorganisatie.

The organisation is affiliated with Christian Democrats locally, nationally and internationally. There are 25 divisions active of the CDJA. These organisations are primarily concerned with provincial and local politics.

The CDJA is involved not only with politics, but also is involved in programmes to increase mutual awareness and connectedness of CDJA youth throughout the organisation. In addition, it offers training and education to young people. While the CDJA is officially independent of the CDA, they do work closely together. While they share the same values, they can differ on opinion on subjects.

== Ideology ==
Like the CDA the CDJA is a political organization that belongs to the Christian democratic movement.

== International ==
The CDJA is a member of YEPP, the youth organization of the European People's Party. In addition, the CDJA active in organizations such as the YIMD that encourages multi-party democracy in developing countries in Africa and South America.

== Chairperson ==
Start	End	Name
1981	1984	Johan de Leeuw
1984	1988	Hans Huibers
1988	1992	Ad Koppejan
1992	1996	Jack de Vries
1996	2000	Teusjan Vlot
2000	2002	Loek Schueller
2002	2004	Pim Walenkamp
2004	2004	Maarten Jansen
2004	2005	Ronald van Bruchem
2006	2009	Harry van der Molen
2009	2011	Jeroen van Velzen
2011	2013	Arrie Vis
2013	2017	Julius Terpstra
2017	2017	Ard Warnink
2017	2019	Lotte Schipper
2019	2021	Hielke Onnink
2021	2022	Tom Scheepstra
2022	2024	Kevin Klinkspoor
2024	Present	Joanne Sloof

== Former members ==
A number of prominent politicians have been former members, they include:

- Maxime Verhagen
- Jan Kees de Jager
- Jack de Vries
- Wim van de Camp
- Corien Wortmann
- Ad Koppejan
- Mirjam Sterk
