= Erik Ronnes =

Dutch politician

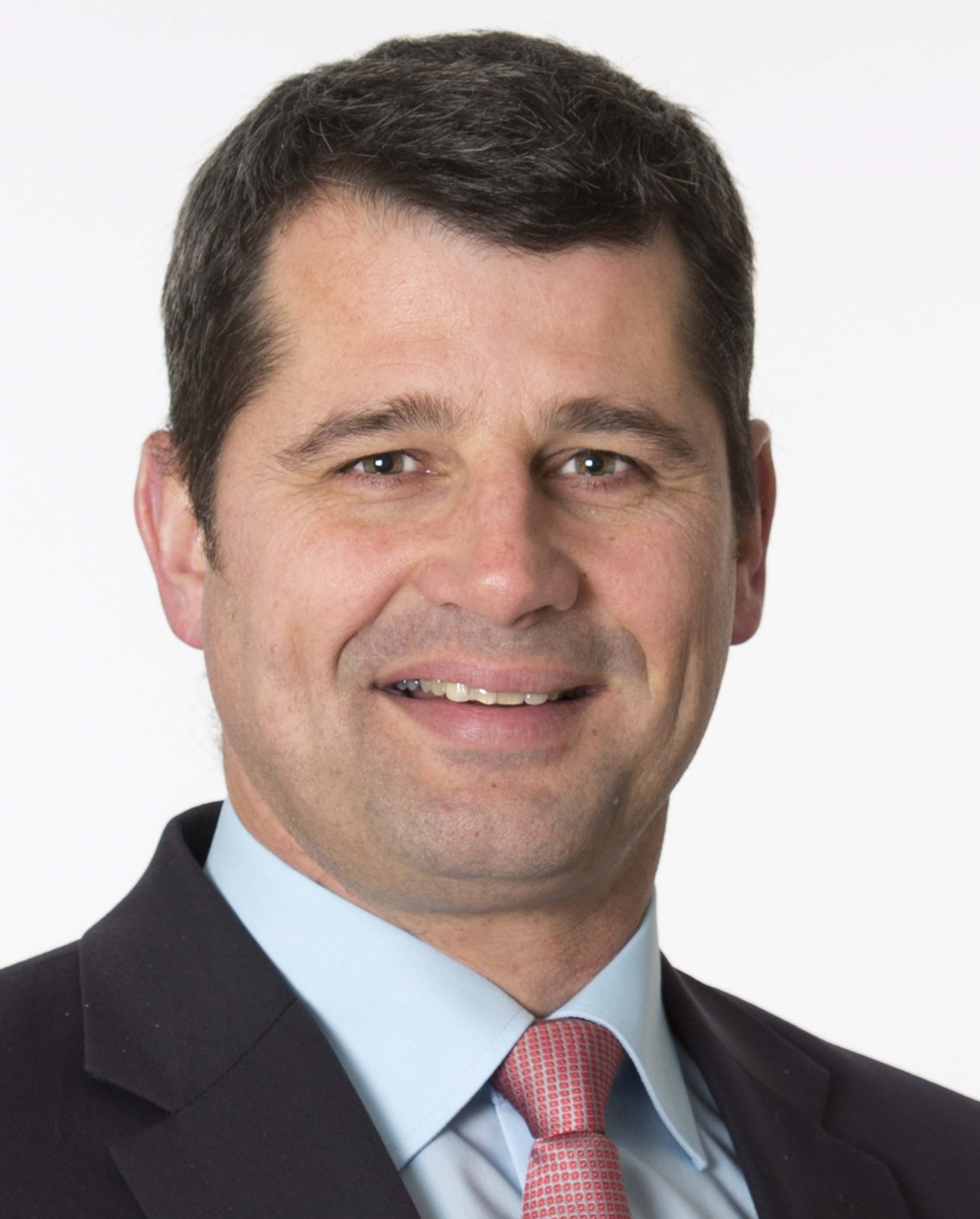

Member of the House of Representatives of the Netherlands
- In office 20 May 2015 – 20 May 2020

Member of the Provincial-executive of North Brabant
- Incumbent
- Assumed office 15 May 2020

Personal details
- Born: 6 November 1967 (age 57); Boxmeer, Netherlands
- Political party: Christian Democratic Appeal

Erik Ronnes (born 6 November 1967) is a Dutch politician. He was member of the House of Representatives of the Netherlands for the Christian Democratic Appeal between 20 May 2015 and 20 May 2020. Since 15 May 2020 he has been member of the Provincial-executive of North Brabant.

== Career ==
Ronnes was born on 6 November 1967 in Boxmeer, but grew up in Vortum-Mullem. His father served as alderman in Vierlingsbeek and as member of the States of North Brabant. Ronnes worked in different capacities for Xerox between 1995 and 2010.

Ronnes was member of the municipal council of Boxmeer for the Christian Democratic Appeal between 1 January 1998 and 8 April 2010, serving as group leader between 2002 and 2010. After the 2010 municipal elections he became alderman. After the next municipal elections in 2014 he stayed on as alderman but received a different portfolio and was also named deputy mayor.

In the Parliamentary elections of 2012 Ronnes occupied number fourteen on the Christian Democratic Appeal party list and the party managed to obtain thirteen seats. Ronnes was thus not elected.

On 20 May 2015 he joined the House of Representatives of the Netherlands when he replaced Sander de Rouwe. On 15 May 2020 he became member of the Provincial-executive of North Brabant. He formally left the House of Representatives on 20 May 2020 and was replaced by Julius Terpstra.

Ronnes was made member of the Order of Orange-Nassau on 20 May 2010.
