= Folkert Thiadens =

Dutch politician (born 1966)

Member of the House of Representatives
- In office 4 July 2024 – 11 November 2025
- Preceded by: Barry Madlener

Personal details
- Born: 6 June 1966 (age 59) Harmelen, Netherlands
- Party: Party for Freedom
- Occupation: Politician

Folkert M. Thiadens (born 6 June 1966) is a Dutch politician for the Party for Freedom (PVV). He was a member of the House of Representatives between July 2024 and November 2025. He succeeded Barry Madlener, who had been appointed infrastructure minister in the Schoof cabinet, and he was the PVV's spokesperson on healthcare for children, the elderly, and disabled people.

== House committee assignments ==
- Committee for Social Affairs and Employment
- Committee for Health, Welfare and Sport
- Contact group France
- Committee for Agriculture, Fisheries, Food Security and Nature

== Electoral history ==
Electoral history of Folkert Thiadens
Year	Body	Party	Pos.	Votes	Result		Ref.
Year	Body	Party	Pos.	Votes	Party seats	Individual	Ref.
2021	House of Representatives	Party for Freedom	44	131	17	Lost	
2023	House of Representatives	Party for Freedom	41	181	37	Lost (Note: Thiadens was appointed to the body later during the term due to a vacancy.)	
2025	House of Representatives	Party for Freedom	37	126	26	Lost	

== See also ==
- List of members of the House of Representatives of the Netherlands, 2023–2025
