= Sander de Rouwe =

Dutch politician

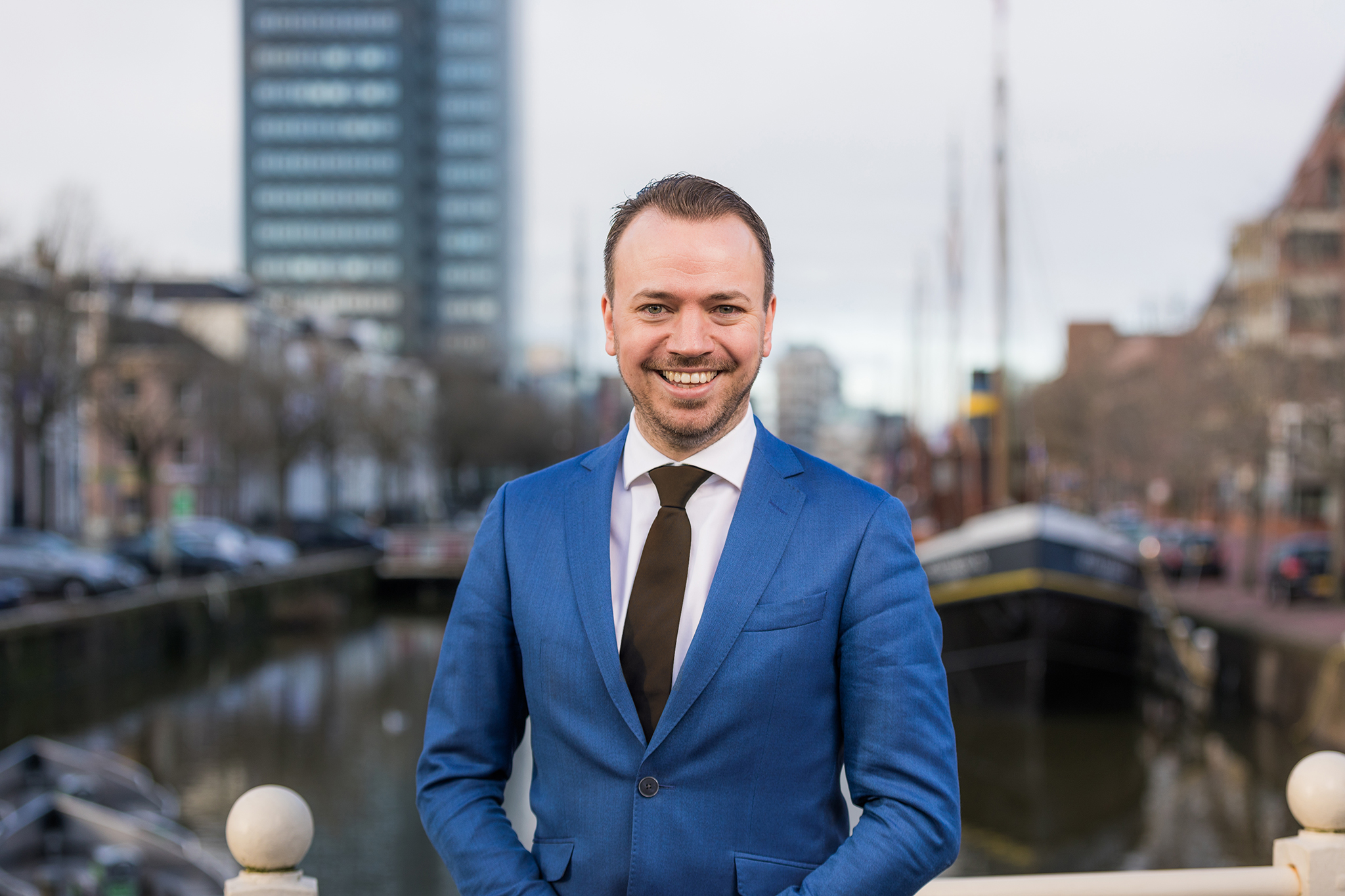

Member of the House of Representatives
- In office 1 March 2007 – 20 May 2015

Personal details
- Born: 1 November 1980 (age 45) Bolsward, Netherlands
- Party: Christian Democratic Appeal
- Occupation: Politician

Sander de Rouwe (born 1 November 1980 in Bolsward) is a Dutch politician. As a member of the Christian Democratic Appeal he was a member of the House of Representatives between 1 March 2007 and 20 May 2015. He focused on matters of traffic, transport, higher and science education, inland navigation and spatial planning.

In the provincial elections of 2015 he was elected to the States of Friesland, in which he served between 26 March and 20 May 2015. On 20 May 2015 he left the House of Representatives to become member of the provincial executive in Friesland, he was replaced by Erik Ronnes. He was invested as a Knight of the Order of Orange-Nassau on his exit from the House.

De Rouwe has been mayor of Kampen since 1 October 2021.
