= Julius Terpstra =

Member of the Dutch House of Representatives

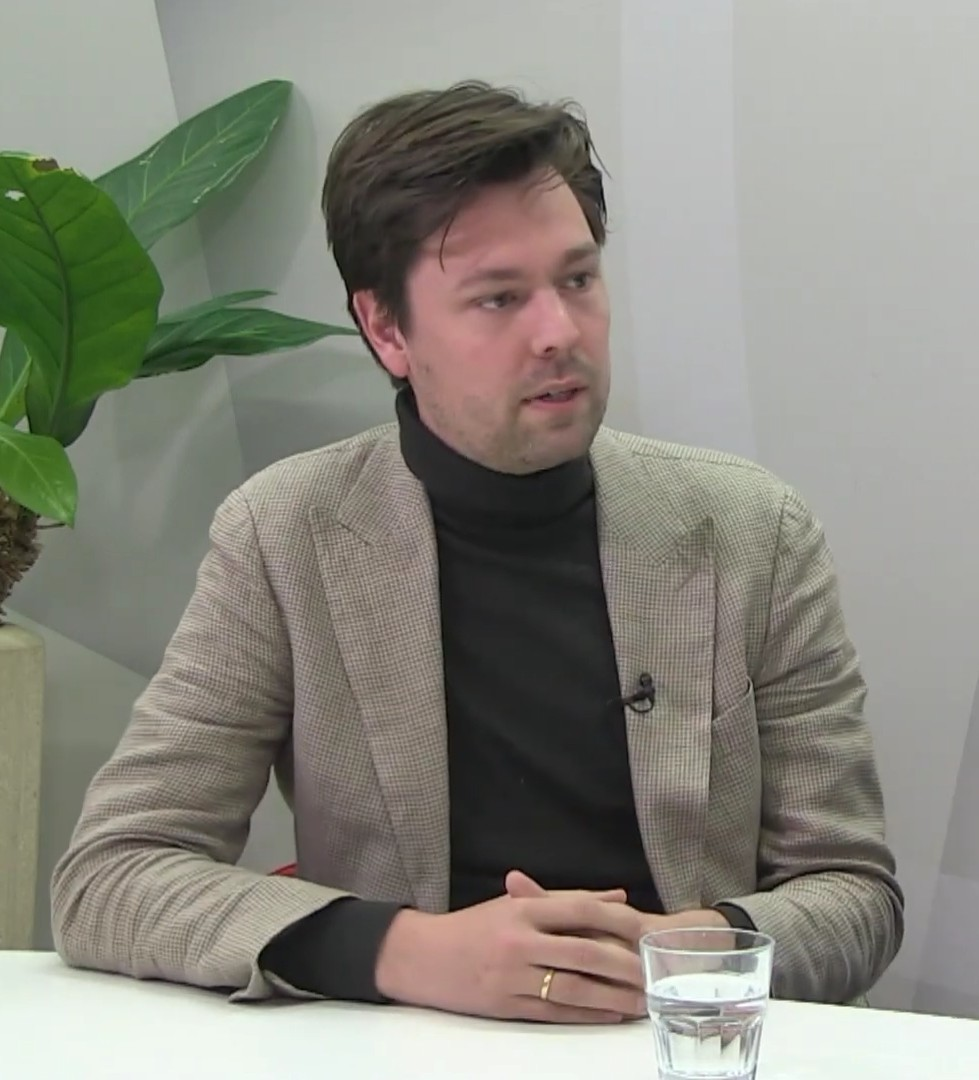

Member of the House of Representatives
- In office 20 May 2020 – 30 March 2021
- Preceded by: Erik Ronnes

Alderman in Leiden
- Incumbent
- Assumed office 16 June 2022

Member of the Leiden municipal council
- In office 30 March 2022 – 14 June 2022
- Succeeded by: Sebastiaan van der Veer

Duoraadslid in the Leiden municipal council
- In office 1 May 2014 – 16 May 2020
- Succeeded by: Tobias Sandoval Garcia

Personal details
- Born: Julius Huibert Terpstra; 21 February 1989 (age 37) Emmeloord, Flevoland, Netherlands
- Party: Christian Democratic Appeal
- Spouse: Kirsten Kok (m. 2018)
- Children: 1
- Education: Leiden University

Julius Huibert Terpstra (born 21 February 1989) is a Dutch politician, who served as a member of the House of Representatives in the years 2020–21. He is a member of the political party Christian Democratic Appeal (CDA). He had served as duoraadslid in the Leiden municipal council and as chair of Christian Democratic Youth Appeal, CDA's youth organization. Following his membership of the House, Terpstra returned to Leiden politics and became alderman for construction following the 2022 municipal elections, having been his party's lead candidate.

== Early life and education ==
Terpstra was born in Emmeloord, a town in Flevoland, on 21 February 1989. He attended Greijdanus College before studying in England for one year. Subsequently, he studied history at Leiden University between 2009 and 2015, earning a Master of Arts degree. While studying, he was a member of the fraternity Navigators and played soccer at LSVV '70.

In 2009, he joined the Leiden affiliate of Christian Democratic Youth Appeal (CDJA) as treasurer. One year later, he became the leader of CDJA Leiden, a position in which he served for two years. Terpstra was elected chair of the national organization CDJA in May 2013 by its members. His second term began two years later. During his tenure, he advocated for a constitutional requirement for a balanced budget, increasing spending on defense, banning the sale of tobacco in supermarkets, and reinstituting conscription. Furthermore, he opposed an elected instead of an appointed mayor. Terpstra stepped down as chair on January 1, 2017, to focus on his job and his campaign to become a member of the House of Representatives.

== Career ==
He participated in the 2014 municipal elections, being sixth on CDA's party list in Leiden. Terpstra was not elected, as his party received four seats. In May, he was appointed duoraadslid in the Leiden municipal council. In August 2016, Terpstra took a job at Nautus, an Amersfoort consultancy firm for municipalities. When CDA won three seats in Leiden during the 2018 municipal elections, he was fourth on the party list. He remained a duoraadslid. Shortly after becoming a member of parliament in 2020, he left Nautus and the Leiden municipal council. In the municipal council, he had been on the education and society committee and had focussed on sport policy.

=== House of Representatives (2020–2021) ===
Terpstra ran for House member during the 2017 general election. During the campaign, he said that abolishing the student loan system was his priority. He was placed 23rd on the CDA's party list and received 1,477 preferential votes. His party won nineteen seats, resulting in Terpstra not being elected. After Erik Ronnes had vacated his seat to join North Brabant's provincial-executive, Terpstra was sworn in as MP on 20 May 2020. Terpstra became the CDA's spokesperson in the area of housing, spatial planning, and the Environment and Planning Act. In the House, he was a member of the Committee for the Interior.

He has advocated for addressing the Dutch housing shortage and for reducing difficulties that young people face when trying to buy their first house. In July 2020, Terpstra introduced a motion, which was approved unanimously by the House, calling for the consideration of previous rent payments when applying for a mortgage. This would make it easier to get financing for a house for people who have already been paying rent at a higher or similar level as the mortgage would be. He has also unsuccessfully called for the interior minister to force Utrecht to build 25,000–30,000 homes in the polders Rijnenburg and Reijerscop. A motion by Terpstra and Daniel Koerhuis was narrowly passed by the House.

Terpstra was the 20th candidate of the CDA during the 2021 general election. He was not re-elected, as his party won fifteen seats. Terpstra personally received 1,297 votes.

=== Leiden alderman (since 2022) ===
Following his membership of the House, Terpstra started working for construction firm Heijmans in July 2021. He was the CDA's lead candidate in the March 2022 Dutch municipal election in Leiden. The local campaign was notable for humorously distancing itself from the national party. Its website stated that voters might think twice about voting for the CDA nationally, but that the local party is allowed to be different due to the lack of Kim Jung Hoekstra practices, combining the names of party leader Wopke Hoekstra and North Korean dictator Kim Jong-un. The CDA lost one of its three seats – following national polling trends – and Terpstra was sworn into the council on 30 March. The CDA joined Leiden's new governing coalition as its only non-leftist member party. Terpstra represented his party in the municipal executive as alderman responsible for housing, construction, and welfare. His term started on 16 June, having stepped down as councilor two days before. That same month, investigative journalism platform Follow the Money wrote that sites Terpstra and Koerhuis had promoted for housing developments as members of parliament were partially owned by major property developers. Terpstra subsequently denied having had ties with developers. In August 2023, Terpstra proposed to the municipal council to bar investors from buying houses in Leiden worth less than €355,000 in order to reduce competition on the housing market. Additionally, he suggested restricting the splitting of houses into student residences as well as mandating that landlords apply for a permit in certain neighborhoods to ensure good renting practices.

Terpstra was offered a seat in the House of Representatives following the resignation of Raymond Knops in February 2023. He declined it to stay on as alderman.

== Personal life ==
While an MP, Terpstra lived in the South Holland city Leiden with his wife Kirsten Kok. They met while studying and married in July 2018, and they have a daughter. Nederlands Dagblad reported in 2013 that Terpstra was a member of the Reformed Church (Liberated).

== Electoral history ==
Electoral history of Julius Terpstra
Year	Body	Party	Pos.	Votes	Result		Ref.
Year	Body	Party	Pos.	Votes	Party seats	Individual	Ref.
2021	House of Representatives	Christian Democratic Appeal	20	665	15	Lost	
