= Solidara =

Solidara (Esperanto for "solidary") was a political party in the Netherlands, founded by former Socialist Party member of the Senate, Düzgün Yildirim. Yildirim was elected to the Senate after a voting mistake, but refused to give up his seat, after which the SP terminated his party membership. Yildirim kept his seat in the senate as an independent and founded Solidara.

Although Solidara never managed to elect members on its own, it did have some members of local and provincial councils who switched party affiliation from SP to Solidara after the split.

On 3 May, the general member assembly decided to dissolve the party, as there were too few active members to form a new executive board.

== Elections ==
In the European Parliament elections of 2009, Solidara obtained 0.2% of the vote, which was not even close to gaining a seat in the European Parliament. The party did not contest the 2010 general election, citing financial difficulties.

In the 2010 local elections Solidara only fielded candidates in Zwolle, and only managed to gain 0.9% of the votes, not nearly enough for a seat in the local council.

In the 2011 provincial elections the party contested two provinces, Drenthe and Overijssel, in which they gained respectively 0.12% and 0.16% of the votes, not gaining any seats. Because of this the party also lost its representation in the Senate, as senators are chosen by the provincial legislators.
