= Liberal Democratic Party (Netherlands) =

Liberal Democratic Party Liberaal Democratische Partij
- Abbreviation: LibDem; LDP
- Chairperson: Sammy van Tuyll
- Founder: Sammy van Tuyll
- Founded: August 2006
- Headquarters: Beelslaan 26, Haarlem
- Ideology: Social liberalism
- Political position: Centre

Website
- libdem.nl

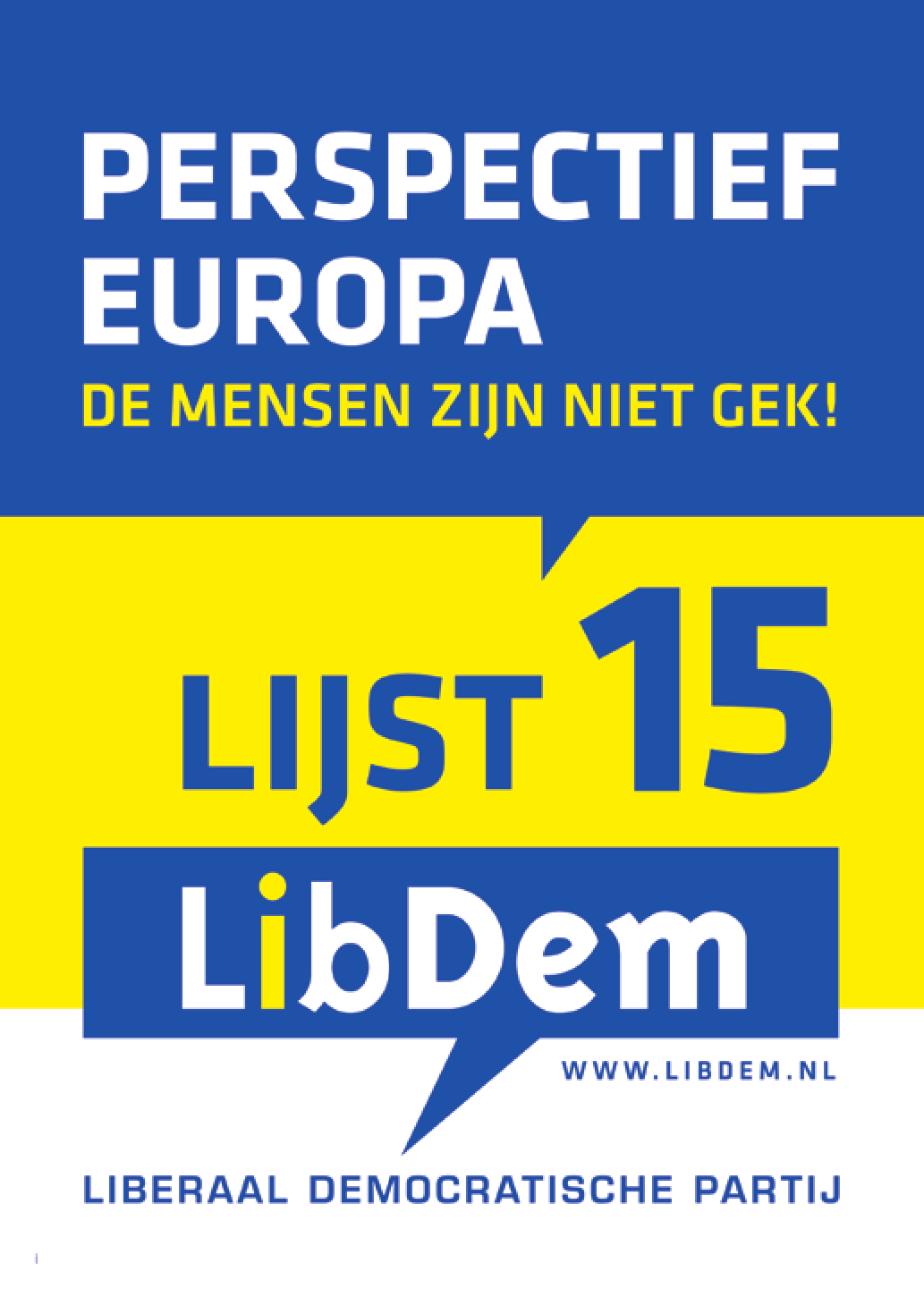
Election poster for the 2014 European Parliament election

The Liberal Democratic Party (Dutch: Liberaal Democratische Partij, LibDem) is a minor social liberal party in the Netherlands, founded in August 2006. The leader of the party is Sammy van Tuyll van Serooskerken.

== Electoral results ==
=== Parliament ===
Election year	House of Representatives			
Election year	# of overall votes	% of overall vote	# of overall seats won	+/–
2006	2,276	0,02 (#19)	0 / 150	New
2012	2,126	0,02 (#19)	0 / 150	0

=== European Parliament ===
Election year	# of overall votes	% of overall vote	# of overall seats won	+/–
2009	10,757	0.24 (#13)	0 / 25	New
2014	6,349	0.13 (#17)	0 / 26	0
