= Natasja Oerlemans =

Dutch politician

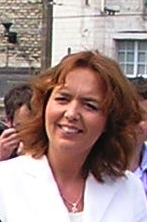
Natasja Oerlemans in Amsterdam (2009)

Natasja Oerlemans (born 30 November 1969 in Rotterdam) is head of Food & Agriculture at the World Wide Fund for Nature (WWF) Netherlands. She was a prominent member of the Party for the Animals.

She stood as a candidate for the European Parliament in the 2009 election.

She is a vegetarian.

== See also ==
- List of animal rights advocates
