= Wim van de Camp =

Dutch politician (born 1953)

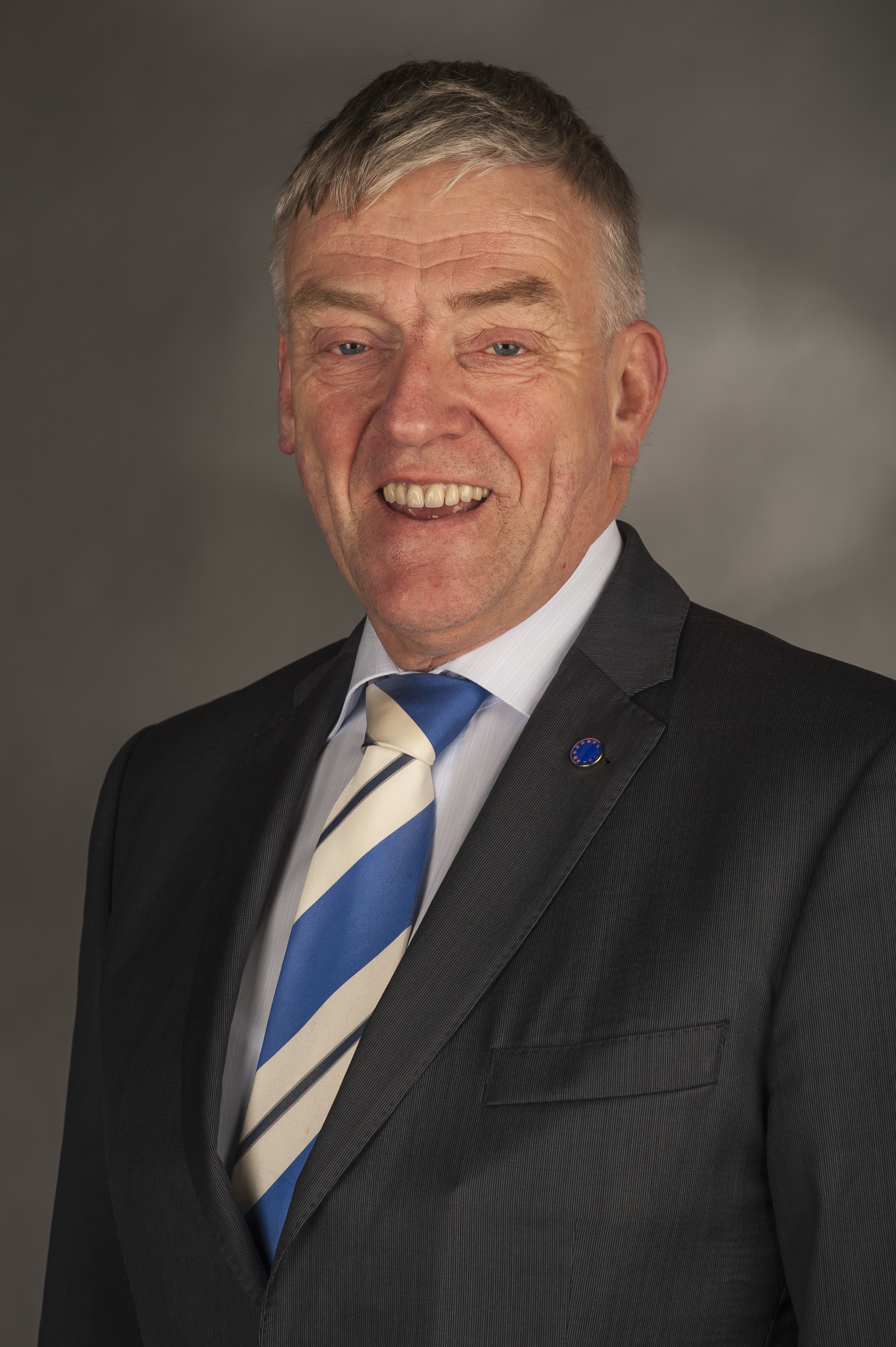

Member of the European Parliament
- In office 14 July 2009 – 2 July 2019
- Constituency: Netherlands

Leader of the Christian Democratic Appeal in the European Parliament
- In office 14 July 2009 – 1 July 2014
- Preceded by: Camiel Eurlings
- Succeeded by: Esther de Lange

Member of the House of Representatives
- In office 3 June 1986 – 14 July 2009

Personal details
- Born: Wilhelmus Gerardus Johannes Maria van de Camp; 27 July 1953 (age 73) Oss, Netherlands
- Party: Christian Democratic Appeal; European People's Party
- Education: Radboud University Nijmegen
- Website: Official website

Wilhelmus Johannes Gerardus Maria "Wim" van de Camp (born 27 July 1953) is a Dutch politician who served as a Member of the European Parliament (MEP) between 2009 and 2019. He was the leader of the Christian Democratic Appeal (CDA) delegation, part of the European People's Party (EPP Group), from 2009 to 2014. He was previously a member of the House of Representatives of the Netherlands from 1986 to 2009) where he was active in the fields of education, justice and asylum policy.

== Early life and education ==
Van de Camp was born on 27 July 1953 in Oss, Netherlands where his parents had an agricultural business. After secondary school, he went to the Higher Agricultural School of Tropical Agriculture in Deventer where he obtained his engineering degree in 1976. He continued his studies in 1982 at the University of Nijmegen where he studied Law.

== Career ==
Van de Camp started his career as a paralegal in the Association of Dutch Municipalities (VNG in Dutch).

=== Career in national politics ===
Because of his early interest in politics, he joined the KVP-Jo, the youth association of the KVP. Between 1978 and 1981, he was President of this association. He then became Vice President of the CDJA, the youth organization of the CDA which arose in 1981 from a merger between the CSF-Jo, ARJOS and CHJO. Later, from 1981 until 1986, he was a member of the national CDA Party administration..

Van de Camp was a member of the Dutch House of Representatives from 1986 until 2009. In this function, he worked mainly on education and justice. He was also Chairman of the standing committees Home Affairs and Education, Culture and Science.

=== Member of the European Parliament, 2009–2019 ===
Van de Camp served as a Member of the European Parliament (MEP) between 14 July 2009 and 2 July 2019. He was the head of the CDA Delegation in the Group of the European People's Party from 2009 to 2014, when Esther de Lange took over as the Dutch EPP-delegation leader. In his role as MEP, he was a permanent member of the Committee on Civil Liberties, Justice and Home Affairs and substitute member of the Committee on Internal Market and Consumer Protection. From 2014 to 2019 he served on the Committee on Transport and Tourism, and was a substitute on the Budgetary Control and International Trade committees. He was also involved in EU-China relations as a member of the European Parliament Delegation for relations with China. He did not seek reelection for the 2019 European Parliament Election.

== Life after politics ==
Since July 2020, Van de Camp has been serving as a special advisor on education in emergencies, migration and inclusion to European Commissioner for Transport Adina-Ioana Vălean.

== Personal life ==
Wim van de Camp is openly gay.

Because of his experience within the Dutch House of Representatives, Wim van de Camp played a prominent role in the guidance of new Dutch Members of Parliament. The 'class of Wim' became a real concept in The Hague. He trained several generations of (CDA) politicians.

In 1998, Wim van de Camp wrote a Party manifesto on safety entitled "Providing Opportunities, Putting Boundaries'. In his text he called for, among other things, the reduction of the criminal liability age from twelve to ten.

Wim van de Camp is an avid motorcyclist. He also brings this passion to his work as an MEP. On 5 December 2012, the European Parliament adopted legislation to oblige the installation of an ABS on all motor vehicles. Wim van de Camp drafted the text for this report. He also expressed his negative opinion on a European Commission proposal that would make annual vehicle inspection mandatory for all motorcycles. According to him, both the direct costs for the rider and the administrative costs would be too high compared to the number of accidents (0.01%) that occur due to poorly maintained vehicles.

== Electoral history ==
Electoral history of Wim van de Camp
Year	Body	Party	Pos.	Votes	Result		Ref.
Year	Body	Party	Pos.	Votes	Party seats	Individual	Ref.
1989	House of Representatives	Christian Democratic Appeal	15	232		Lost	
1994	House of Representatives	Christian Democratic Appeal	22	451		won	
1998	House of Representatives	Christian Democratic Appeal	11	2,401		won	
2002	House of Representatives	Christian Democratic Appeal	24	2,881		Won	
2003	House of Representatives	Christian Democratic Appeal	24	1,163		Won	
2006	House of Representatives	Christian Democratic Appeal	24	1,097		Won	
2009	European Parliament	Christian Democratic Appeal	1	579,775	5	Won	
2014	The Hague Municipal Council	Christian Democratic Appeal	46	24			
2014	European Parliament	Christian Democratic Appeal	3		5	Won	
2015	Provincial Council of South Holland	Christian Democratic Appeal	30				
2019	Water board Hoogheemraadschap van Delfland	Christian Democratic Appeal	48	50			
2019	Provincial Council of South Holland	Christian Democratic Appeal	49	125			
2022	The Hague Municipal Council	Christian Democratic Appeal	35	24			
2026	The Hague Municipal Council	Christian Democratic Appeal	38 (Note: Van de Camp participated as a lijstduwer.)	17	2	Lost	
