= Erik Meijer (politician) =

Dutch politician (born 1944)

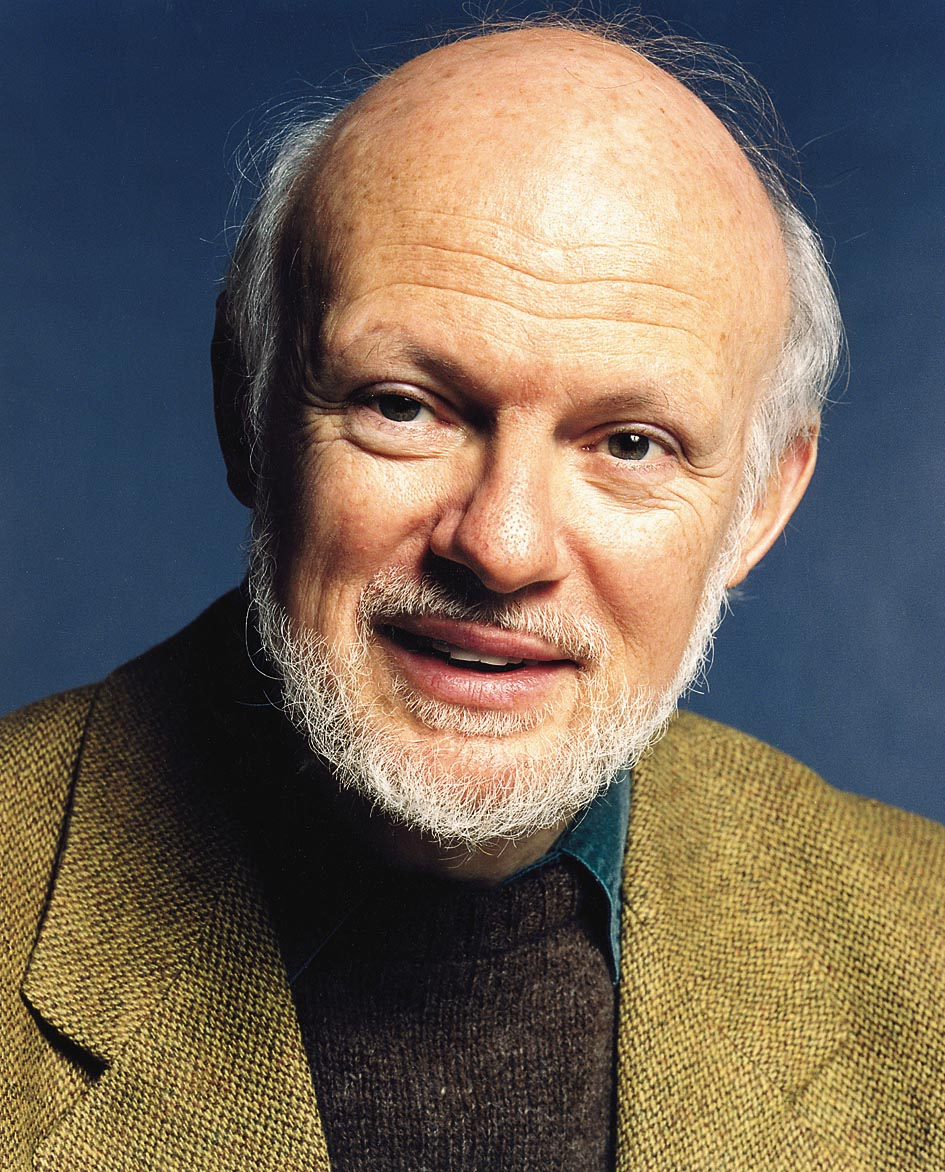
Erik Meijer

Erik Meijer (born 5 December 1944) is a former Dutch politician who was a member of the European Parliament for the Dutch Socialist Party, part of the European Left, between 1999 and 2009. From July 2014 till June 2015 he was a member of the Dutch Senate.

In the European Parliament he was a substitute for the Committee on Foreign Affairs and a member of the Delegation to the EU-Croatia Joint Parliamentary Committee.

== Biography ==
In 1999 European Parliament elections Meijer won the first seat for the SP in the European Parliament.

Born in 1944 in Amsterdam, Meijer, who lives in Rotterdam, studied human geography and later taught geography before becoming a civil servant. Politically active since the beginning of the 1960s, including as an executive member of Socialist Youth (SJ), in the 1970s he was elected to represent the Pacifist Socialist Party (PSP) on Amsterdam City Council. During this period he led the Proletarian Left within the PSP, which later split to form what now is Socialist Alternative Politics. Meijer stayed within the PSP. From 1982 to 1995 he served as member of the States-Provincial of South Holland, having been elected on a combined PSP-CPN-PPR ticket. Following the formation of the GreenLeft, which united these tendencies, he became the party's national vice-chair, a position which he held until 1995.

At the beginning of 1996, Meijer left Green Left for the SP. In 1998 he became chair of the SP branch in Delfshaven, a poor district of Rotterdam, at the same time working to build up the party's European contacts.

In the European Parliament the SP forms part of the United Left Group (GUE-NGL). The party's priority is resistance to the development of a European Superstate too far removed from the people and too closely attached to the interests of European multinationals.

In the European elections of 10 June 2004, the SP's electoral support grew from 5% to 7%, giving the party a second seat. Re-elected, Meijer was joined by Kartika Liotard.

His comments in the Skopje daily Utrinski Vesnik on 14 January 2008 drew the ire of readers in the Republic of Macedonia. He said that the country should tear down statues of the ancient Macedonian conqueror Alexander the Great erected on its territory and agree to a name change in its bilateral dispute with Greece.

He was invested as a Knight of the Order of Orange-Nassau on 8 September 2009.

On 8 July 2014 he was made member of the Dutch Senate, replacing Arjan Vliegenthart. His term ended on 9 June 2015.

== Education ==
- 1972: Higher degree in human geography
