= Barry Madlener =

Dutch politician (born 1969)

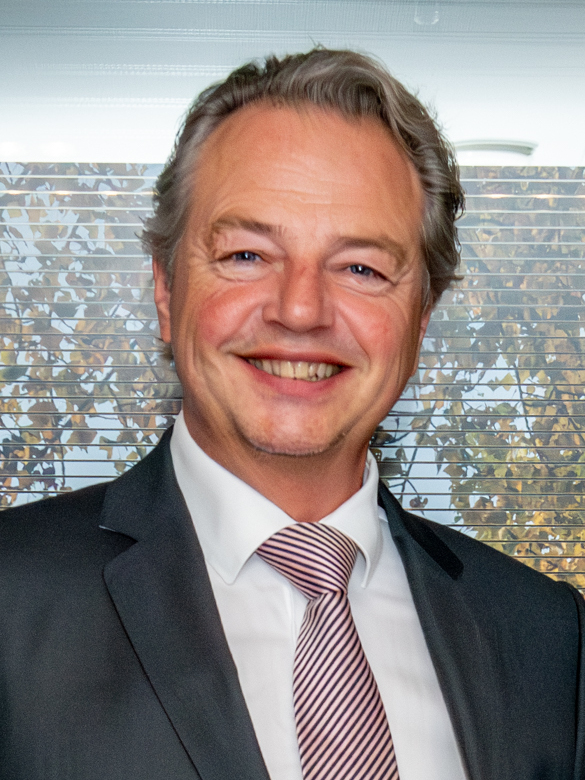
- Madlener in 2025

Minister of Infrastructure and Water Management
- In office 2 July 2024 – 3 June 2025
- Prime Minister: Dick Schoof
- Preceded by: Mark Harbers
- Succeeded by: Robert Tieman

Member of the House of Representatives
- In office 20 September 2012 – 2 July 2024
- Succeeded by: Folkert Thiadens
- In office 30 November 2006 – 14 July 2009

Leader of the Party for Freedom in the European Parliament
- In office 14 July 2009 – 19 September 2012
- Preceded by: Position established
- Succeeded by: Laurence Stassen

Member of the European Parliament
- In office 14 July 2009 – 19 September 2012
- Constituency: Netherlands

Personal details
- Born: January 6, 1969 (age 57) Leiden, Netherlands
- Party: Party for Freedom
- Other political affiliations: Livable Rotterdam
- Children: 1
- Occupation: Politician; estate agent

Barry Madlener (born 6 January 1969) is a Dutch politician, who served as Minister of Infrastructure and Water Management in the Schoof cabinet from July 2, 2024, until June 3, 2025, when the PVV left the Schoof cabinet. A member of the Party for Freedom (PVV), he was first elected to the House of Representatives in 2006. He became the PVV's leader in the European Parliament following the 2009 election. Madlener resigned from that position to again serve in the House of Representatives from the 2012 general election until 2024.

== Biography ==
=== Early life ===
During his youth, Madlener lived in the south seaside village of Oostvoorne with his parents and older sister. He later moved to Rotterdam for his studies. After graduating from high school he became a real estate agent and spent a number of years selling commercial real estate. On 14 March 2002 he was inaugurated as a member of the municipal council of Rotterdam for Livable Rotterdam, a position he held until 2007. Together with Kay van der Linde he was also involved in establishing the Livable Netherlands political party.

=== Livable Rotterdam ===
At the 2002 municipal election, Madlener was listed eleventh on the Livable Rotterdam list, the local party whose leader Pim Fortuyn was assassinated later that year. Madlener was considered a confidant of Fortuyn. The party won 17 seats in these historical elections on 6 March 2002. As a municipal councillor Madlener was infrastructure spokesman. In that function he was an outspoken supporter of the construction of a campus at the Erasmus University Rotterdam. He was also in favour of prohibiting municipal civil servants wearing a veil. He put forward two proposals: a proposal to prohibit carrying religious symbols for all civil servants, as well as a second proposal to the same effect for teachers and support staff at schools. He also stated that physical education at Muslim schools should be a mixed gender class.

=== House of Representatives and European Parliament ===
Elected to the House of Representatives in the 2006 general election, he was placed seventh on the Party for Freedom list led by Geert Wilders. It was the first general election in which the party participated. Madlener resigned as a Rotterdam municipal councillor on 1 July 2007. He led the PVV in the 2009 European Parliament election before returning to the House of Representatives following the 2012 election. He became the PVV's spokesperson for infrastructure after the 2017 general election, and his specialty has been housing following the November 2023 election. Over the years, he has advocated merging passenger railway operator Nederlandse Spoorwegen and railway infrastructure management organization ProRail, and he has opposed establishing an international rail connection between Eindhoven and Aachen in Germany.

=== Minister of Infrastructure and Water Management ===
After the PVV, VVD, NSC, and BBB formed the Schoof cabinet, Madlener was sworn in as Minister of Infrastructure and Water Management on 2 July 2024.

In its governing agreement, the cabinet committed to limiting air traffic movements from and to Amsterdam Airport Schiphol, to reduce noise pollution for local residents by 20% over time. In his final plan, Madlener proposed to reduce air traffic movements to 478,000 in 2025, down from 500,000, which would result in a 15% noise pollution reduction. The House later urged Madlener, without success, to stick to a 17% reduction, which had been agreed to before. Responding to unsafe situations and nuisance caused by electric fatbikes, the House passed a motion by the VVD and NSC calling on Madlener to set a minimum driving age of 14 and to require helmets. He did not comply with the demand, arguing that fatbikes could not easily be distinguished from other electric bicycles and that they do not come with increased risk.

Madlener worked with provinces and water companies on plans to ensure the reliable supply of potable water, following warnings of a potential future shortage. They agreed in January 2025 to closely cooperate to select and more quickly develop new water extraction sites.

== Personal life ==
Madlener has been a long-time resident of the South Holland village of Rockanje. He met his wife in Brussels, and their son was born in 2013.

== Electoral history ==
Electoral history of Barry Madlener
Year	Body	Party	Pos.	Votes	Result		Ref.
Year	Body	Party	Pos.	Votes	Party seats	Individual	Ref.
2006	House of Representatives	Party for Freedom	7	344	9	Won	
2009	European Parliament	Party for Freedom	1	382,610	4	Won	
2010	House of Representatives	Party for Freedom	47 (Note: Madlener participated as a lijstduwer.)	260	24	Lost	
2012	House of Representatives	Party for Freedom	8	829	15	Won	
2017	House of Representatives	Party for Freedom	7	987	20	Won	
2021	House of Representatives	Party for Freedom	10	532	17	Won	
2023	House of Representatives	Party for Freedom	12	693	37	Won	
2025	House of Representatives	Party for Freedom	80	564	26	Lost	

== Notes ==
Political offices
Preceded by Mark Harbers	Minister of Infrastructure and Water Management; 2024–present	Incumbent
Party political offices
Preceded by First	Parliamentary leader of the Party for Freedom in European Parliament; 2009–2012	Succeeded by Laurence Stassen
