= Marije Cornelissen =

Dutch politician (born 1974)

Marije Cornelissen MEP
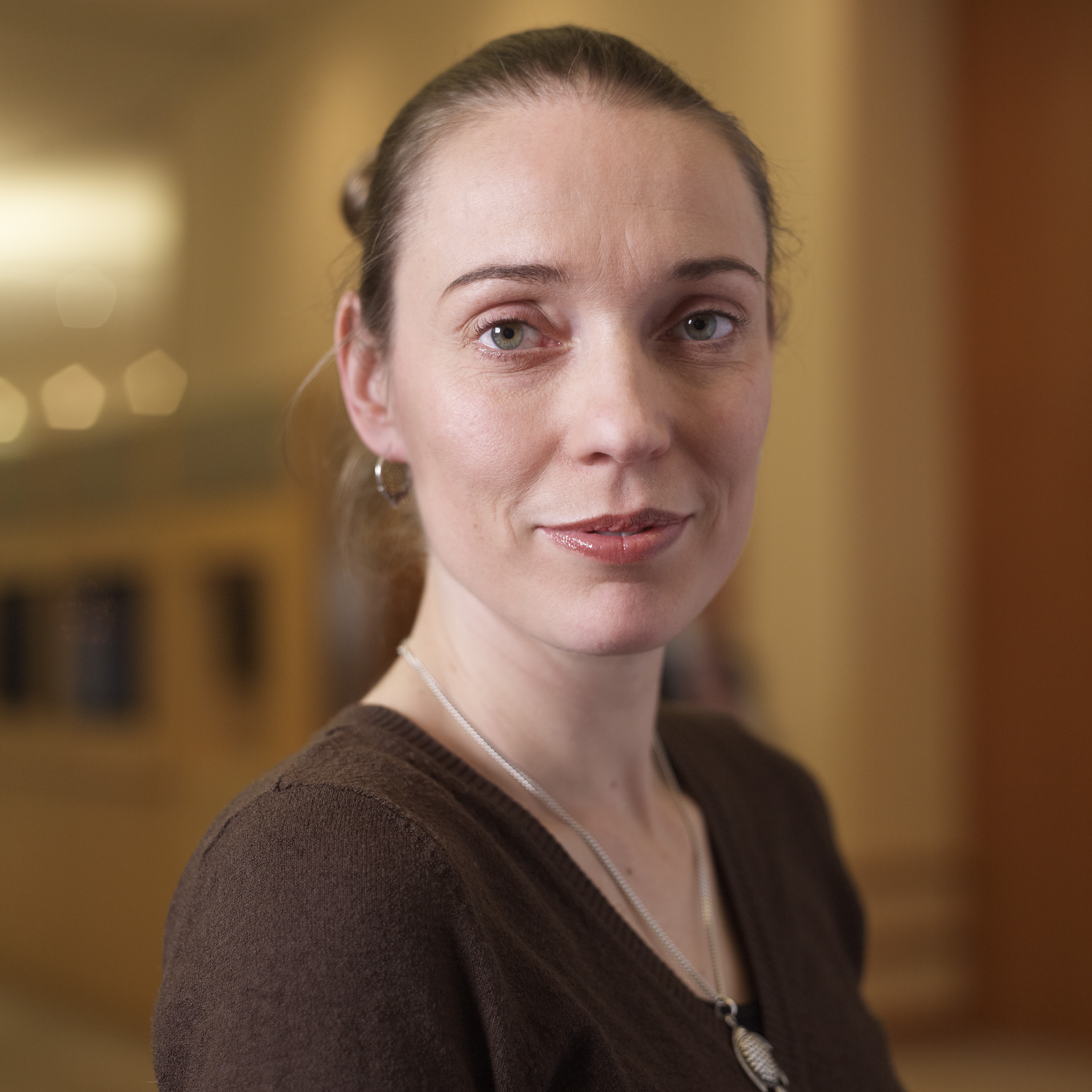

Member of the European Parliament
- In office 2009–2014
- Constituency: Netherlands

Personal details
- Born: Marije Cornelissen; 9 March 1974 (age 52) Stiens, Netherlands
- Party: Dutch: GreenLeft; EU; Greens–European Free Alliance
- Website: MarijneCornelissen.nl

Marije Cornelissen (born March 9, 1974, in Stiens) is a Dutch politician who served as a Member of the European Parliament from 2009 until 2014.

== Life before politics ==
Cornelissen grew up in a leftwing and feminist family. At a young age she participated in the demonstrations against the presence of weapons of mass destruction in the Netherlands. As an atheist she attended a Catholic primary school. Cornelissen studied international relations at the University of Utrecht, where specialized in conflict studies.

Since the 1990s Cornelissen has been active in the GreenLeft. Between 1996 and 1997 she worked as assistant to MEP Nel van Dijk on women's rights (between 1996 and 1997). In addition she was active in the Feminist Network of the GreenLeft (chair between 1996 and 2001) and she was active in the European Green Party, where she coordinated the dialogue between East and West European Greens (Dutch delegate between 1999 and 2006). She also worked at the party bureau (1997–1999) and was a member of the party board (2001–2005). Between 2002 and 2003 she was international secretary of the GreenLeft where she participated in the Dutch demonstrations against the War in Iraq. In 2004 European Parliament election she was put on the eight spot of the GreenLeft list.

Until 2009 she worked as director of the North Holland North Anti-Discrimination bureau. Since 2006 he is a member of the borough council in Amsterdam South Amstel. She chairs the council. Within the GreenLeft she is a member of the party council between 2005 and 2007 and 2008 and 2009.

== Political life ==
In 2009 she was a candidate for the European Parliament for the GreenLeft. The party congress put her on number three of the list, which was deemed unelectable. As a candidate for the European Parliament Cornelissen campaigned on social affairs, emancipation and anti-discrimination. She advocated increased solidarity between the member states of the European Union. Unexpectedly the GreenLeft won a third seat in the election and Cornelissen was elected.

After the election she became a member of the Committee on Women's Rights and Gender Equality and Committee on Employment and Social Affairs She was also one of the vice-chairs of the Greens - European Free Alliance political group.

She served as member of the European Parliament between 14 July 2009 and 1 July 2014.
