= Sammy van Tuyll van Serooskerken =

Dutch politician

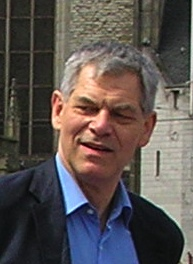
Sammy van Tuyll van Serooskerken (May 2009)

Samuel Ernest "Sammy", Baron van Tuyll van Serooskerken (born 10 October 1951 in Velp) is a Dutch politician and a member of the Dutch nobility. He was co-founder of the Liberal Democratic Party (Liberaal Democratische Partij, abbr. "LibDem") and was head of list for this party in the 2006 and 2012 Parliament elections.

== Education ==
After his secondary education, van Tuyll studied medicine at the University of Groningen. After graduating in medicine in 1976, he studied economics and law at the University of Amsterdam, in which he graduated in 1983 and 1987 respectively.

== Career ==
After a career at the Dutch Central Bank De Nederlandsche Bank and the Ministry of Finance, van Tuyll worked in Brussels from 1994 to 2001; he was Economic Advisor at the European Commission.

== Politics ==
Van Tuyll is a co-founder of Liberal Democratic Party (Liberaal Democratische Partij).

== Personal ==
Van Tuyll is married and has six children.
