= 2009 European Parliament election in the Netherlands =

- 4 June 2009

25 seats to the European Parliament
- Turnout: 36.75%
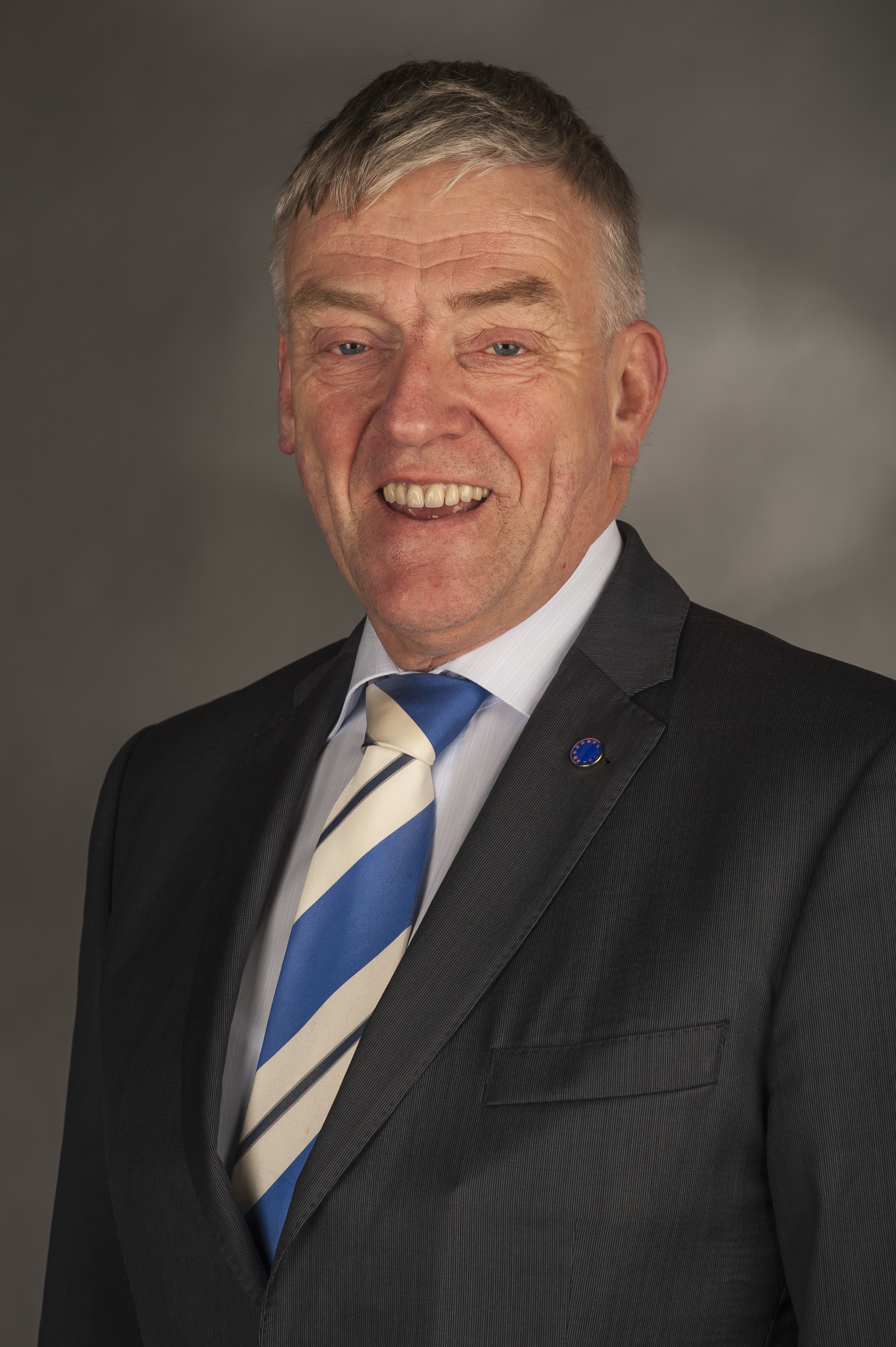

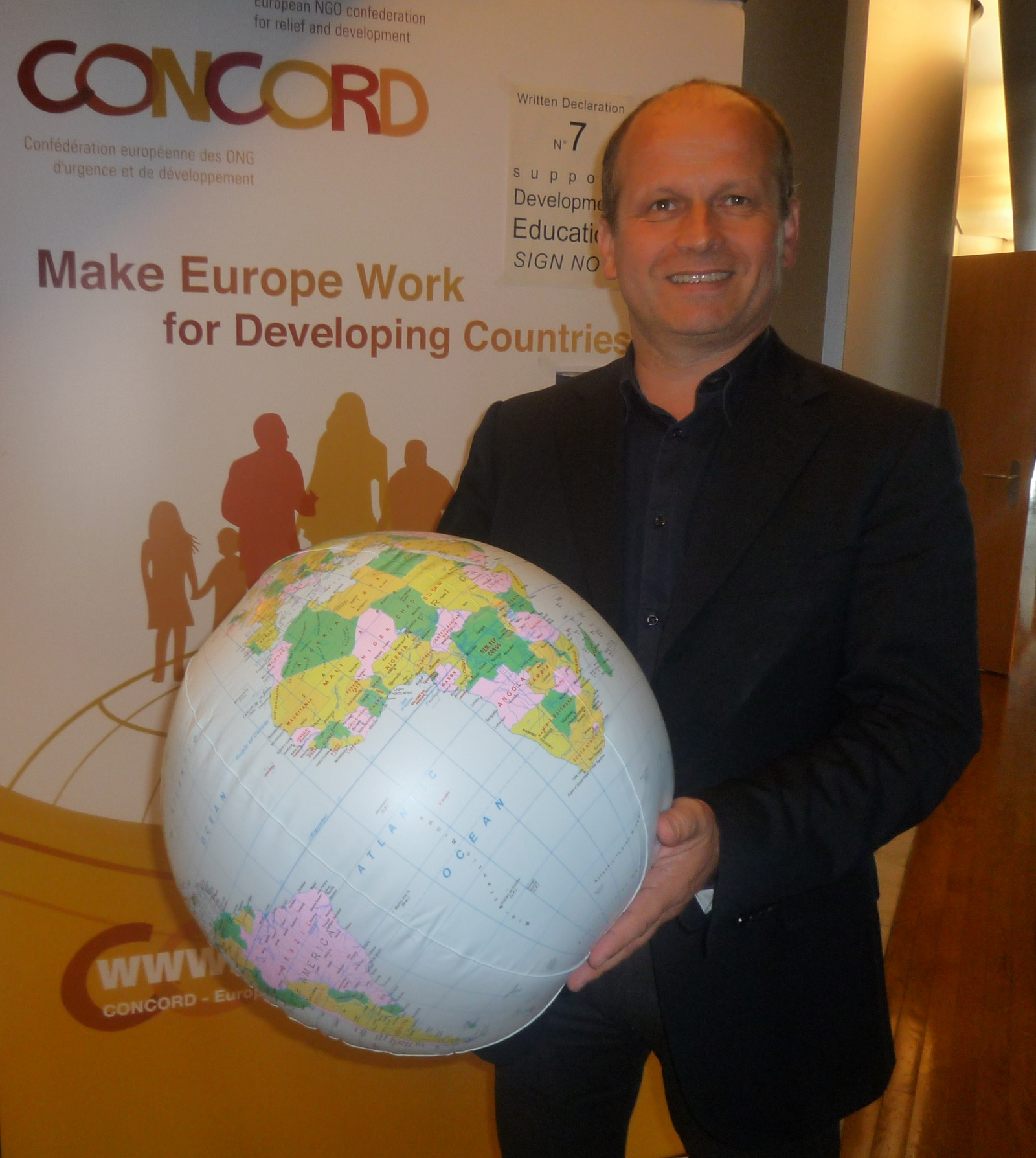

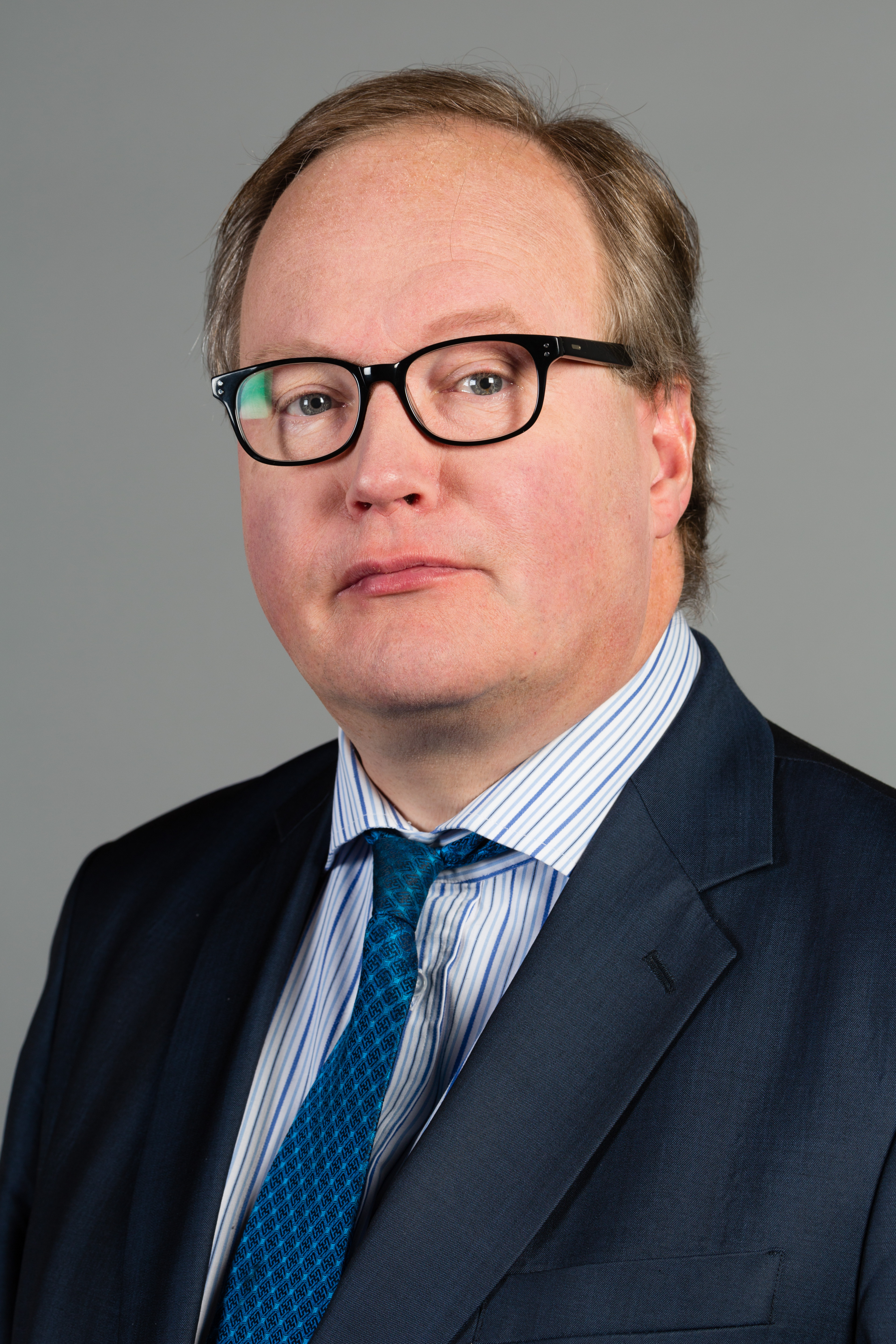

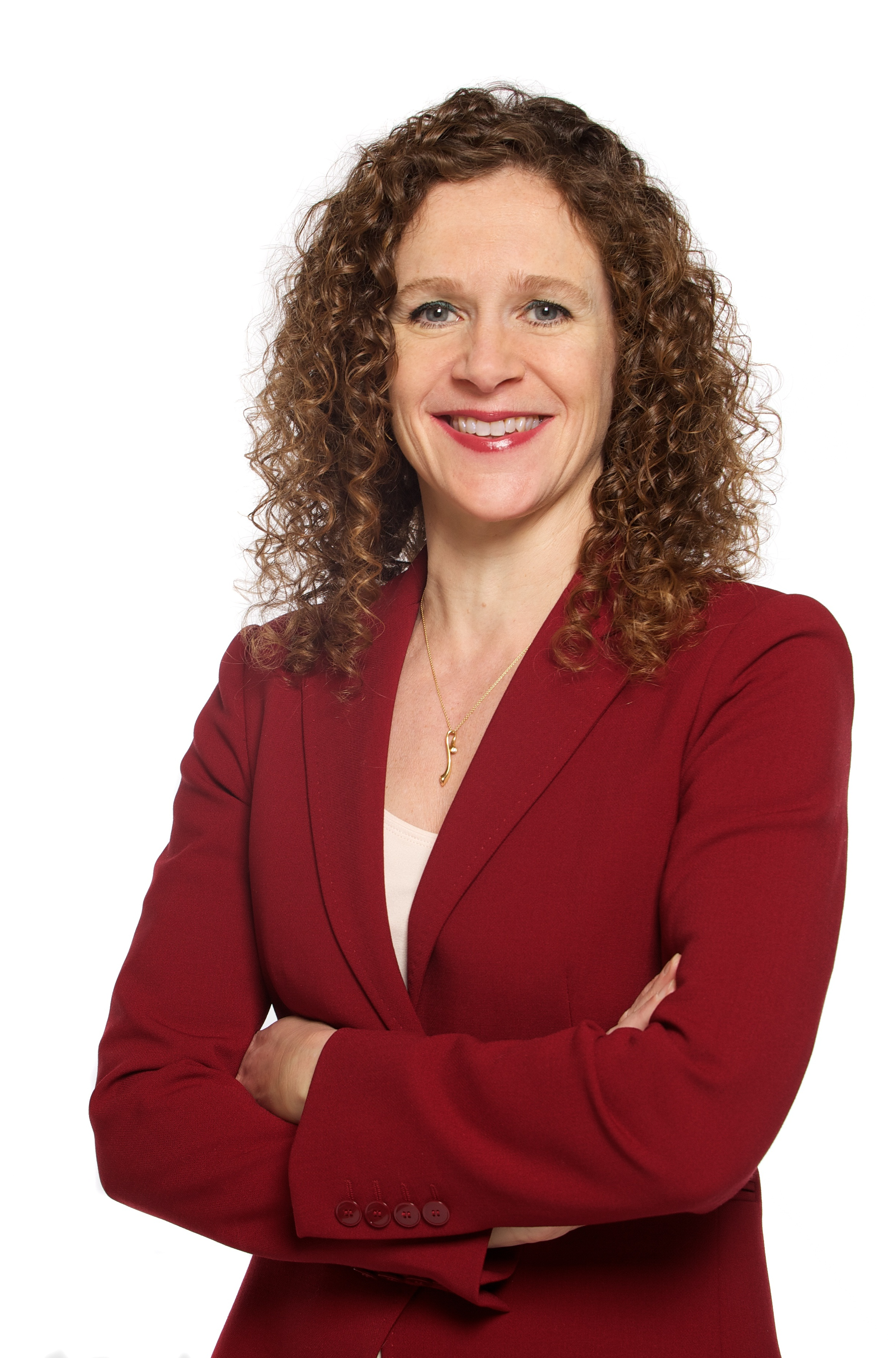

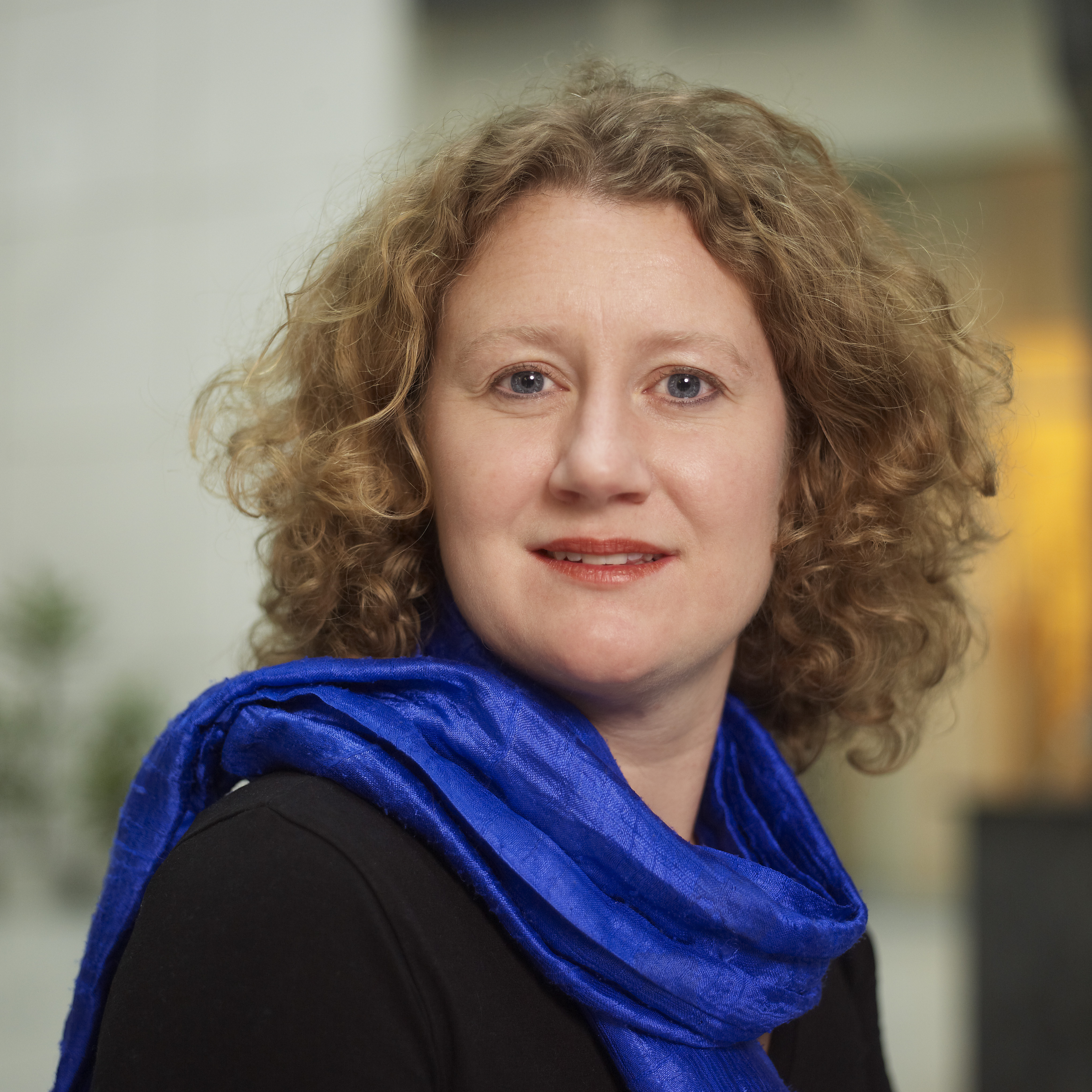

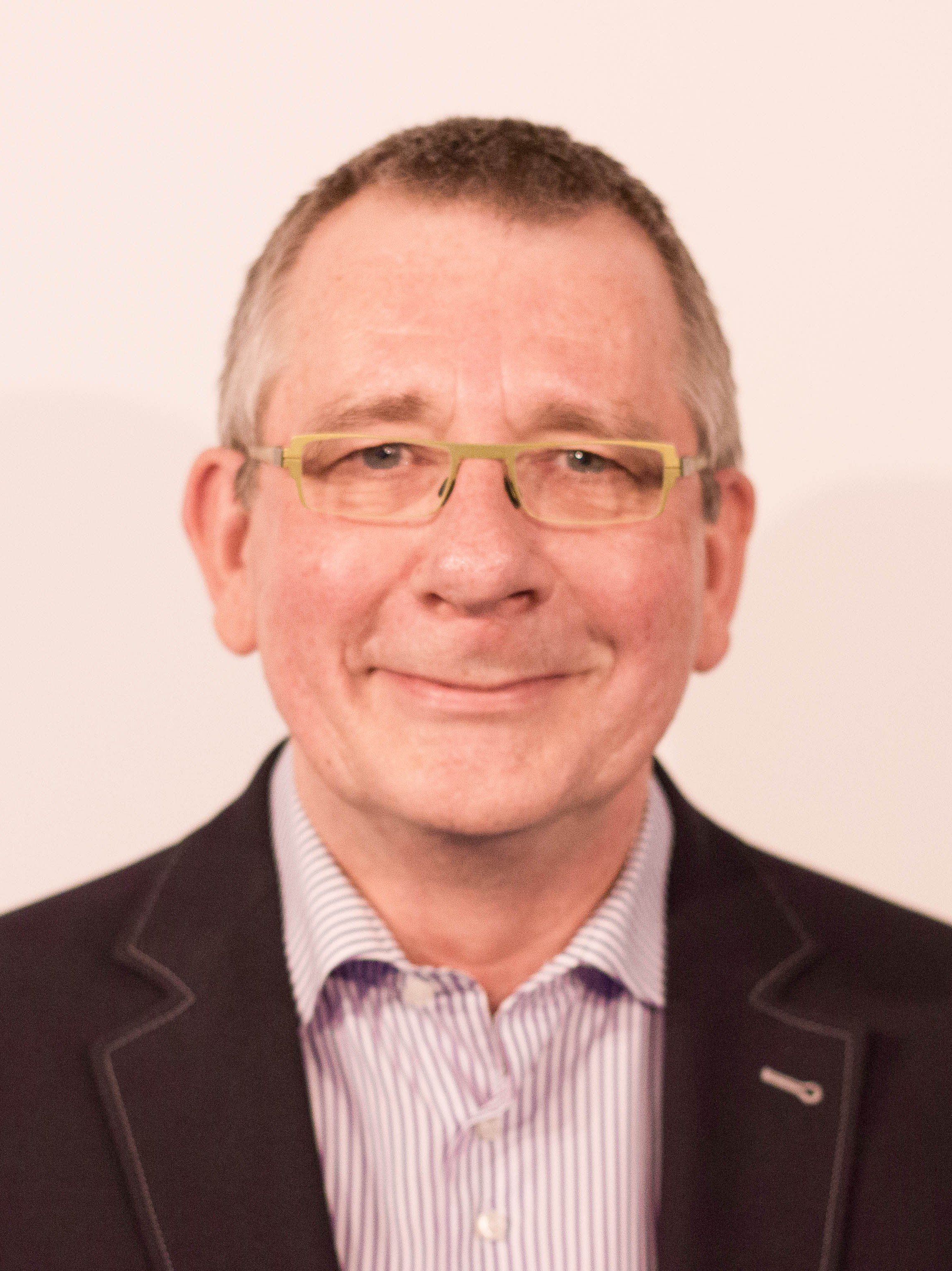

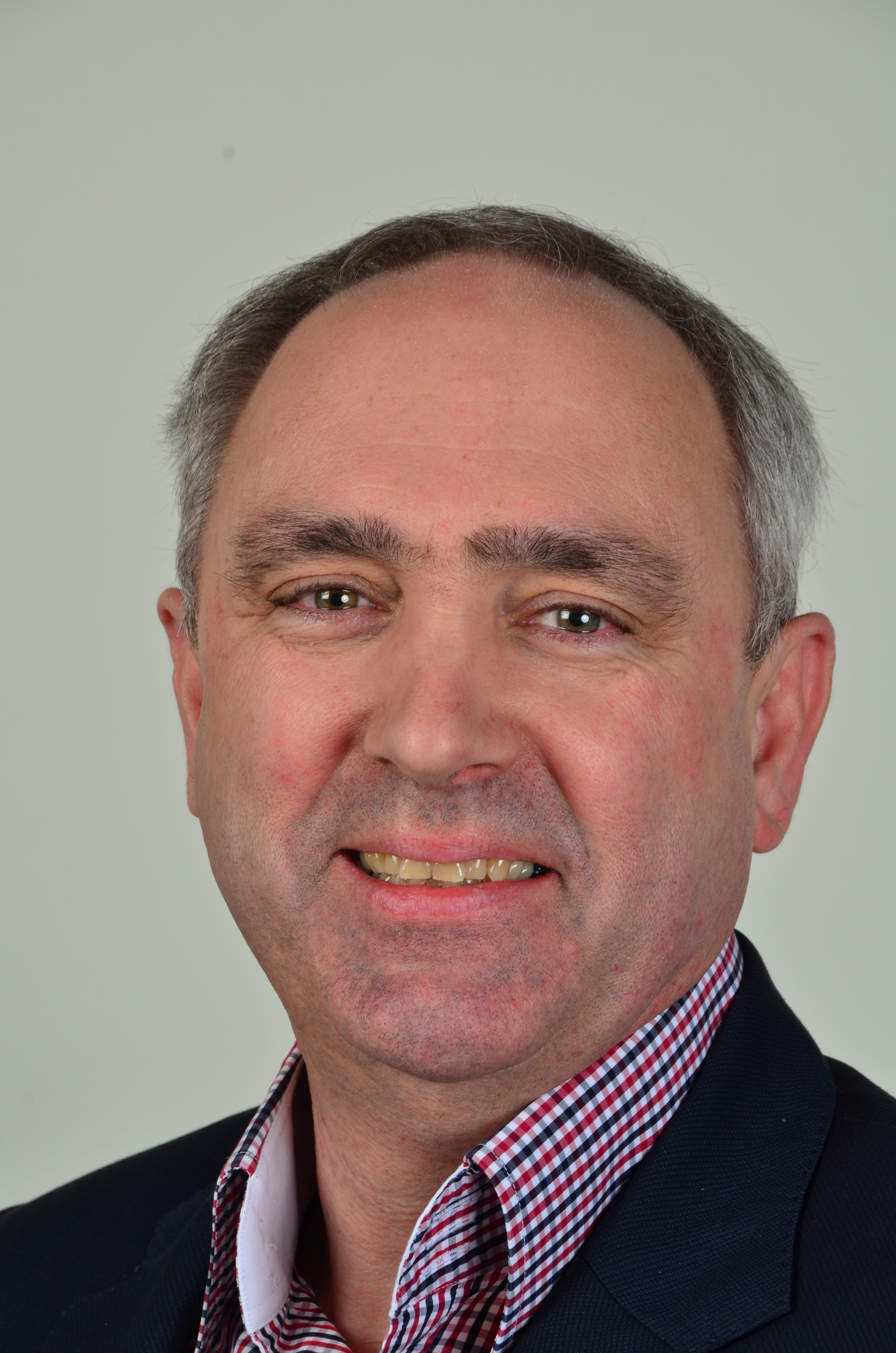
	First party	Second party	Third party
Leader	Wim van de Camp	Barry Madlener	Thijs Berman
Party	CDA	PVV	PvdA
Alliance	EPP	NI	PES
Seats won	5 / 25	4 / 25	3 / 25
Seat change	2 ▼	4 ▲	4 ▼
Popular vote	913,233	772,746	548,691
Percentage	20.05%	16.97%	12.05%
Swing	4.33% ▼	new	11.60% ▼
	Fourth party	Fifth party	Sixth party
Leader	Hans van Baalen	Sophie in 't Veld	Judith Sargentini
Party	VVD	D66	GL
Alliance	ALDE	ALDE	Greens-EFA
Seats won	3 / 25	3 / 25	3 / 25
Seat change	1 ▼	2 ▲	1 ▲
Popular vote	518,643	515,422	404,020
Percentage	11.39%	11.32%	8.87%
Swing	1.81% ▼	7.08% ▲	1.53% ▲
	Seventh party	Eighth party
Leader	Dennis de Jong	Peter van Dalen
Party	SP	CU–SGP
Alliance	EUL/NGL	ECR / EFD
Seats won	2 / 25	2 / 25
Seat change	0	0
Popular vote	323,269	310,540
Percentage	7.10%	6.82%
Swing	0.13% ▲	0.91% ▲

An election of Members of the European Parliament representing Netherlands constituency took place on 4 June 2009. Seventeen parties competed in a D'Hondt type election for the available 25 seats (down from 27). For the first time, all Dutch residents of the Netherlands Antilles and Aruba were also entitled to vote in the election.

== Background ==
=== Political co-operation ===
The Christian Union and SGP formed a common list Christian Union-SGP for the European Parliament election. Moreover, several parties formed an electoral alliance:

1. CDA/European People's Party and Christian Union-SGP, with 1,223,773 votes
2. VVD/European Liberal-Democrats and Democrats 66, with 1,034,065 votes
3. PvdA/European Social-Democrats and GreenLeft, with 952,711 votes

All three alliances would be eligible for a remainder seat, because all the parties involved won a seat in the European Parliament. Without the alliance between the Dutch Labour Party and Greenleft, GreenLeft would have only two seats and PVV would have five seats. The other electoral alliances had no effect on the overall seats awarded.

=== New electorate ===
The Netherlands Antilles and Aruba were granted the right to vote in the European Parliament election by a verdict of the Council of State which stated that it is illegal to differentiate in law between people with Dutch nationality in Europe and outside. The government granted all persons of Dutch nationality voting rights for European elections. Before the verdict, only people who had lived in the Netherlands for 10 years or longer were allowed to vote. This ruling increased the number of people entitled to vote by 210,000. Only 20,944 people registered to vote from the islands in this election. The turnout of registered voters in the Netherlands Antilles and Aruba was 77% (rest of the world 66%.) This new voting right does not change the position of the Netherlands Antilles and Aruba. They are not considered to be part of the European Union and they do not need to adopt European law.

Before this election, people placed under a guardian were not allowed to vote. Usually a person has the status of guardian because the ward is incapable of caring for their own interests. A ruling of the Council of State decided that this was not allowed under the International Covenant on Civil and Political Rights. It is not known how many people this affected, as there is no central register for individuals under guardianship.

=== Treaty of Lisbon ===
Under the Treaty of Lisbon, the Netherlands was to get a 26th seat in the European Parliament. Because this treaty had not yet been ratified by all member states at the time of the elections, this seat could not be given to a party at that time. The State Secretary for the Interior, Ank Bijleveld-Schouten, made a proposal for allocating it if the Lisbon treaty were to be ratified by all member states, but this had not been accepted by parliament at the time of the election. According to the proposal made by the government, the seat would be awarded to the Party for Freedom.

The Party for the Animals contested this proposal, claiming that the minister ignored part of the Electoral Council's opinion. They raised their objection after the official results came in. Under the Electoral Council's opinion, the Party for the Animals should have gained the seat.

Several parties in the States-General had already stated that this changed the election rules after the elections, and, if the rules were to be changed, the opposition had missed their chance by not contesting them before the elections. They had thus de facto agreed to the proposal. Advice had been requested from the Council of State on the matter. If the election had been for 26 seats rather than 25 from the start, the 26th seat would have been awarded to the Party for Freedom. On 9 October, the Dutch cabinet announced that the 26th seat would be awarded to the Party for Freedom. This would give them a total of 5 seats when the Lisbon treaty came into effect.

=== Treaty of Nice ===
At present, the exact number of seats allocated to each country is determined by the Treaty of Nice, and is adjusted by the accession treaty of each new member. This last adjustment occurred with the enlargement in 2007. Hence no change to the seats occurs without ratification by all member states. According to the treaties, the maximum number of members in the Parliament is 732. However, allocation does not take into account any enlargements to the European Union expected during the Parliamentary term. Hence, when Romania and Bulgaria joined the union in 2007, the number of seats temporarily rose to 785, but later dropped back to 736 at time of the 2009 election. Because of this, the Netherlands had 27 seats in 2004 but only 25 in 2009.

=== Numbering of the candidates list ===
The official order and names of candidate lists:

Candidate lists for the European Parliament election in the Netherlands
2009
Lists
List		English translation	List name (Dutch)
1	list	CDA - European People's Party	CDA – Europese Volkspartij
2	list	P.v.d.A./European Social Democrats	P.v.d.A./Europese Sociaaldemocraten
3	list	VVD - European Liberal-Democrats	VVD – Europese Liberaal-Democraten
4	list	GreenLeft	Groenlinks
5	list	SP (Socialist Party)	SP (Socialistische Partij)
6	list	Christian Union-SGP	ChristenUnie–SGP
7	list	Democrats 66 (D66)	Democraten 66 (D66)
8	list	Newropeans	
9	list	Europe Cheap! & Sustainable	Europa Voordelig! & Duurzaam
10	list	Solidara	
11	list	Party for the Animals	Partij voor de Dieren
12	list	European Whistleblower Party (EKP)	Europese Klokkenluiders Partij (EKP)
13	list	The Greens	De Groenen
14	list	PVV (Party for Freedom)	PVV (Partij voor de Vrijheid)
15	list	Liberal Democratic Party	Liberaal Democratische Partij
16	list	Party for European politics (PEP)	Partij voor Europese Politiek (PEP)
17	list	Libertas	

== Results ==
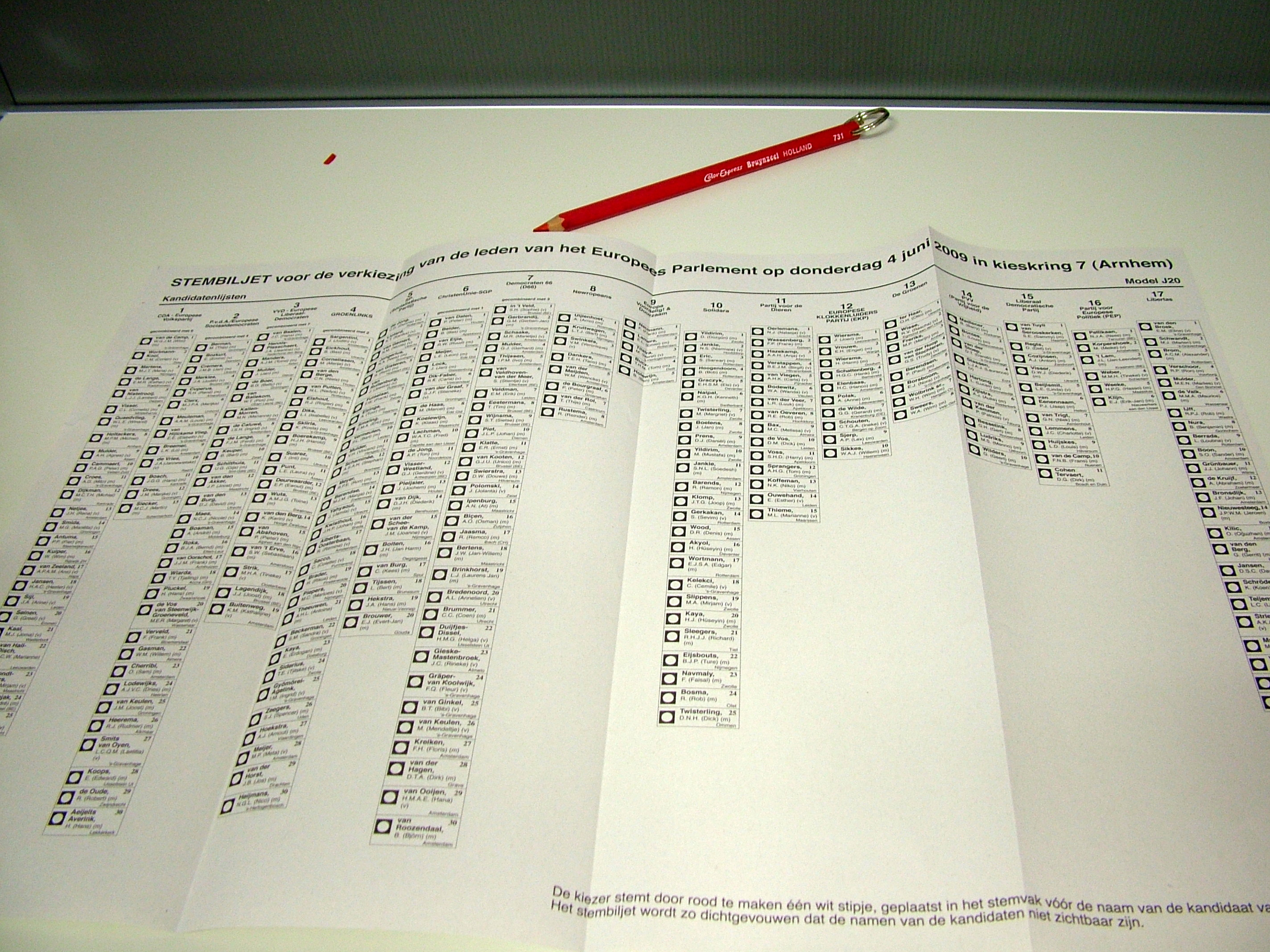
Voting ballot

The Christian Democratic Appeal (CDA) remained the biggest party (five seats), despite losing two seats. The biggest winners were the Party for Freedom (up four seats) and Democrats 66 (up two). The biggest loser was the Labour Party, which lost more than half its seats (down four).

Voter turnout was 36.75%, a little lower than in 2004 (39.26%). The highest turnout was in Rozendaal (65.7%) and the lowest in Rucphen (22.3%).

Party	Votes	%	Seats	+/–
Christian Democratic Appeal	913,233	20.05	5	–2
Party for Freedom	772,746	16.97	4	New
Labour Party	548,691	12.05	3	–4
People's Party for Freedom and Democracy	518,643	11.39	3	–1
Democrats 66	515,422	11.32	3	+2
GroenLinks	404,020	8.87	3	+1
Socialist Party	323,269	7.10	2	0
Christian Union – Reformed Political Party	310,540	6.82	2	0
Party for the Animals	157,735	3.46	0	0
European Whistleblower Party	21,448	0.47	0	New
Newropeans	19,840	0.44	0	New
Libertas	14,612	0.32	0	New
Liberal Democratic Party	10,757	0.24	0	New
The Greens	8,517	0.19	0	New
Solidara	7,533	0.17	0	New
Europe Cheap! & Sustainable	4,431	0.10	0	New
Party for European politics	2,427	0.05	0	New
Total	4,553,864	100.00	25	–2
Valid votes	4,553,864	99.57		
Invalid/blank votes	19,879	0.43		
Total votes	4,573,743	100.00		
Registered voters/turnout	12,445,497	36.75		
Source: Kiesraad

=== European groups ===
The Alliance of Liberals and Democrats for Europe became the biggest group in the Netherlands, after an electoral loss for the parties in European People's Party–European Democrats and European Socialists group.

The European Greens–European Free Alliance lost a seat, despite GreenLeft winning a seat. This was because Europe Transparent, which sat in the European Greens-EFA group, did not take part in this election. Newcomer Party for Freedom is not part of a European group and is under Non-Inscrits. The Christian Union-SGP was in the Independence/Democracy group, but this group did not meet the requirements to be a group in the European Parliament and was dissolved. The Christian Union and SGP entered talks with the European Conservatives after the elections. The SGP was asked to change their stance on women's issues, but declined. After that the Christian Union joined the European Conservatives on its own. After 25 years of co-operation, the Christian Union and Reformed Political Party split into two groups in the European parliament.

Summary of the 4 June 2009 European Parliament elections in the Netherlands
2009
European group		Seats 2004	Seats 2009	Change
Alliance of Liberals and Democrats for Europe	ALDE	5	6	1 ▲
European People's Party	EPP	7	5	2 ▼
Progressive Alliance of Socialists and Democrats	S&D	7	3	4 ▼
The Greens–European Free Alliance	Greens-EFA	4	3	1 ▼
European United Left–Nordic Green Left	EUL-NGL	2	2	0
European Conservatives and Reformists	ECR	0	1	1 ▲
Europe of Freedom and Democracy	EFD	2	1	1 ▼
Non-Inscrits	NI	0	4(+1)	4(+1) ▲
		27	25(+1)	2(+1) ▼

=== Elected members ===
Twenty members were elected by preference vote. Twenty-four people got this amount, but not all could be appointed because either the party did not get enough seats or they got no seats.

Members not elected, but enough preference votes:

- Christian Democratic Appeal – Maria Martens 38,781 votes. (party did not win enough seats)
- Socialist Party – Nicole van Gemert 23,662 votes. (party did not win enough seats)
- Party for Animals – Natasja Oerlemans 115,472 votes and Marianne Thieme 18,314 votes (party did not win any seat)
