= Laurence Stassen =

Dutch politician and television presenter

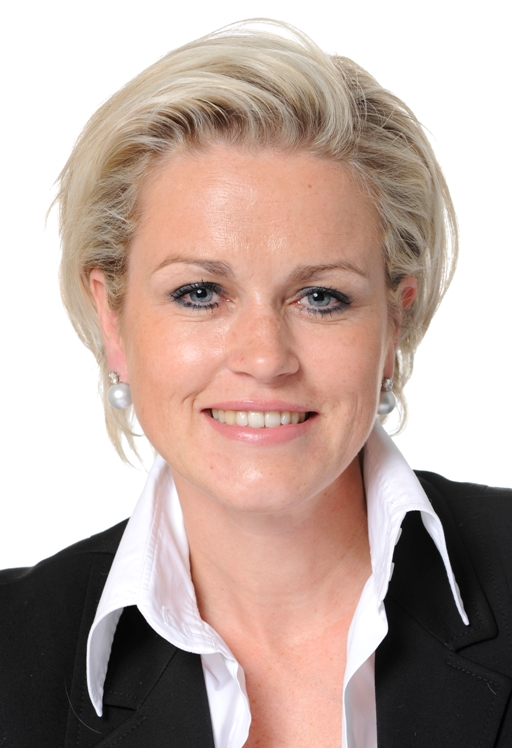

Parliamentary leader of the Party for Freedom in the European Parliament
- In office 19 September 2012 – 24 March 2014
- Preceded by: Barry Madlener
- Succeeded by: Lucas Hartong

Member of the European Parliament
- In office 14 July 2009 – 1 July 2014
- Constituency: Netherlands

Personal details
- Born: Laurence Jeanne Arnoldine Joseph Stassen; 8 February 1971 (age 55) Sittard, Netherlands
- Party: Independent
- Other political affiliations: Party for Freedom (2009–2014); An Independence from Europe (2014); For the Netherlands (2014– 2017)
- Occupation: Vice-chair of the PVV EU group 2009-2014; Chair of PVV limburg 2011- June 2012; Freelance journalist
- Website: L.J.A.J. (Laurence) Stassen at www.parlement.com

Laurence Jeanne Arnoldine Joseph Stassen (born 8 February 1971, in Sittard) is an independent Dutch politician and a former freelance television presenter of the regional broadcasting TV Limburg. There she presented the program sponsored Limburg Leeft (translated: Limburg Lives) about residency and life in Limburg.

In the 2009 European Parliament elections, Stassen was ranked as fourth on the Party for Freedom (PVV) list. The PVV won four seats, but the lower-ranked party leader Geert Wilders was elected by preference votes. Wilders, however, had already declared that he would remain in the House of Representatives of the Netherlands and not take up his seat in the European Parliament, thus Stassen became a Member of the European Parliament on 14 July 2009.

On 10 December 2010, it was announced that Stassen would run for PVV party leader in the province of Limburg in the 2011 provincial elections. She was so elected and retained her membership of the European Parliament. On 21 March 2014, she left the PVV after allegedly discriminatory remarks by Geert Wilders about Moroccans. She stayed on until the European Parliament elections in May 2014, but immediately left the States-Provincial in Limburg, returning her seat to the Party for Freedom.

Stassen then stood in the 2014 European elections for the constituency of South East England in the UK as the number one candidate for the Eurosceptic party An Independence from Europe. She was not elected.

In December 2014, Stassen announced that she had joined the party For the Netherlands, which had been founded by two fellow former PVV members earlier that year.

Laurence Stassen is married with two children. She lives in Echt.
