= Dennis de Jong =

Dutch politician

Dennis de Jong MEP
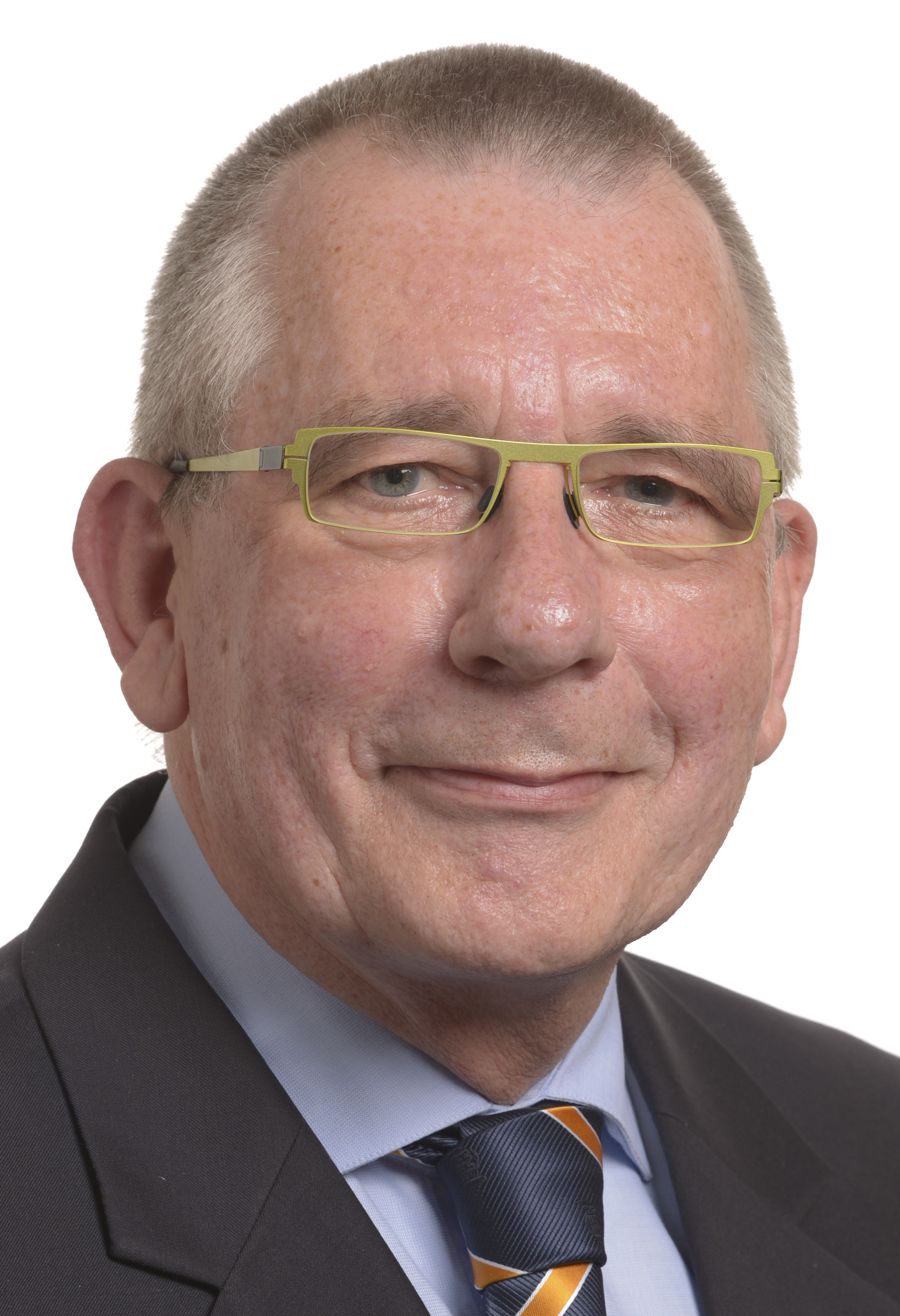

Leader of the Socialist Party in the European Parliament
- In office 7 July 2009 – 2 July 2019
- Preceded by: Erik Meijer

Member of the European Parliament
- In office 7 July 2009 – 2 July 2019
- Constituency: Netherlands

Personal details
- Born: Cornelis Dingenis de Jong; 22 May 1955 (age 71) Delft, Netherlands
- Party: Socialist Party; European United Left–Nordic Green Left
- Spouse: Kees Vrijdag
- Children: Four
- Education: Erasmus University Rotterdam

Cornelis Dingenis "Dennis" de Jong (born 22 May 1955) is a Dutch politician of the Socialist Party. He was elected and reelected to the European Parliament in 2009 and 2014 as his party's top candidate, and he was the Leader of the Socialist Party in the European Parliament. As an MEP, he is part of the European United Left–Nordic Green Left. in 2019, he did not seek reelection.

== Early life and education ==
De Jong was born 22 May 1955. he studied law and political economy at Erasmus University Rotterdam. He obtained his degrees in 1976 and 1977 and then went to New York City, where he obtained his master's degree in international relations at the New School for Social Research in 1979.

== Political career ==
After his studies, De Jong started his career in 1979 at the Ministry of Foreign Affairs, where he worked as a diplomat at the NATO management. From 1983 to 1987, De Jong worked at the Ministry of Social Affairs and Employment in the International Relations and European Integration Department. From 1987 to 1993, De Jong subsequently worked at the Ministry of Justice and Security, where he was responsible as head of department for the development of the immigration and refugee policy.

Because of his experience at the Ministry of Justice, he was seconded to the European Commission on behalf of the Netherlands. There he wrote the Commission report, which for a long time was the basis for proposals in the field of asylum and migration policy of the European Union. After his three years for the European Commission, De Jong stayed in Brussels, this time to work as a justice council at the Dutch Permanent Representation of the Netherlands to the European Union. In 1998 he returned to the Netherlands, where he was responsible for several major conferences at the Ministry of Foreign Affairs, Justice and again Foreign Affairs. De Jong also obtained his PhD in 2000 at the Maastricht University in the field of international human rights, in his last appointment between 2002 and 2009 he was the special human rights and good governance advisor on behalf of the Netherlands.

De Jong has been active in the Socialist Party (SP) since 2007, where he coordinated the working group on social globalization for several years. Since 2007, De Jong has been part of the departmental board of the Rotterdam SP.

=== Member of the European Parliament ===
He was elected and reelected to the European Parliament in 2009 and 2014 as his party's top candidate, and he was the Leader of the Socialist Party in the European Parliament. As an MEP, he is part of the European United Left–Nordic Green Left. in 2019, he did not seek reelection.

== Personal life ==
Dennis de Jong is openly gay and lives with his husband Kees Vrijdag with whom he has four children in Rotterdam. He is a member of the Protestant Church in the Netherlands.
