= Maria Martens =

Dutch politician (born 1955)

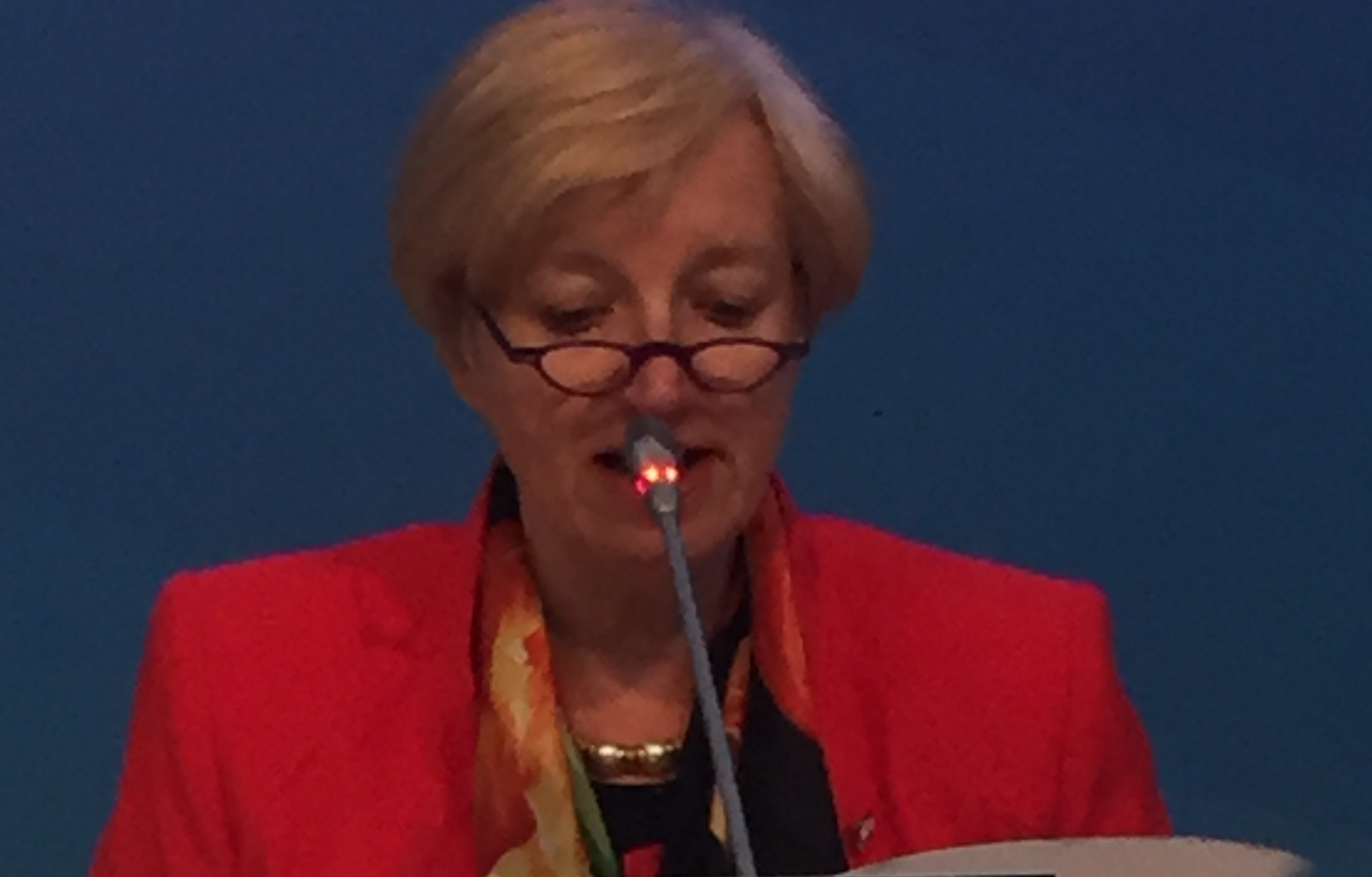

Maria Johanna Theodora Martens (born 8 January 1955 in Doetinchem, Gelderland) is a Dutch politician. She is a member of the Christian Democratic Appeal. From 2011 until 2019 she was a member of the Dutch Senate.

From 1999 to 2009 she was a Member of the European Parliament (MEP). There she was a member of the bureau of the EPP-ED group in the European Parliament and sat on the European Parliament's Committee on Development.

She was also a substitute for the Subcommittee on Security and Defence and a member of the delegation to the ACP-EU Joint Parliamentary Assembly.

== Career ==
- Higher degree in theology (1984)
- NIMA (Netherlands Marketing Institute) A and B diplomas
- Lecturer in Life Philosophy (1984)
- Foreign Affairs Secretary, Netherlands Mission Council (1984–1988)
- Study secretary, VKMO (Association of Catholic Social Organisations) (1988–1999)
- Chairwoman, Nijmegen CDA
- Member of the party council
- Member of the editorial team of CD Verkenningen
- Chairwoman, European Forum of National Committees of the Laity (1996–2000)
- Chairwoman, Netherlands Episcopal Committee for the year 2000 (1996–2000)
- Member of the governing board of the Catholic Theological University, Utrecht (since 1998)
- Commissioner for recreation in the Veluwe area (RGV)
- Member of the executive board of the World Population Fund (WPF)
- Member of the European Parliament (since 1999)
- Awarded knighthood in the Order of Orange-Nassau (2009)
- Decorated in Order of St. Gregory the Great (2024).
