= Corien Wortmann-Kool =

Dutch politician (born 1959)

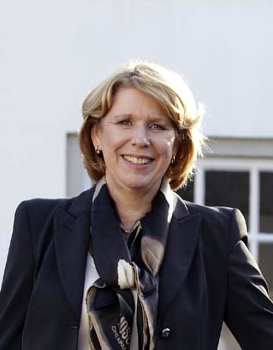
Corien Wortmann-Kool

C.M. (Corien) Wortmann-Kool (born 27 June 1959 in Oud-Alblas) is a Dutch politician of the Christian Democratic Appeal (CDA) who served as a Member of the European Parliament from 2004 until 2014. She has a background in politics, public administration and business. During her time in parliament, she served as vice president on Economic and Financial Affairs of the European People's Party (EPP) Group. She has an MA in Political Science and Economics from VU University Amsterdam.

Wortmann-Kool has been chairing the Stichting Pensioenfonds ABP since 1 January 2015.

== Career ==
Wortmann-Kool started her political career in the board of the youth organization of the CDA. From 1987 until 1994, she was a member of the executive board of the CDA party. During the municipal elections of 1994, she was elected as council member of the municipal council in her town of residence, Zeist. In 1995, she became Chair of the CDA delegation in the municipal council, from which she retired in 1999.

From 1996 onwards, Wortmann-Kool worked at the Dutch Ministry of Transport, Public Works and Water Management where she served as senior policy advisor and project leader on projects related to the governance of the Public Sector. From 2001, she served as deputy and acting Director for Transport and Infrastructure. Prior to this she was Member of the executive board of a retail company.

=== Member of the European Parliament ===
In 2004, Wortmann-Kool became a Member of the European Parliament for the EPP Group, of which the Dutch Christen Democratisch Appel (CDA) is a part. In 2009, she has become the vice-president of the EPP Group on Economy, Finance and Environment. Wortmann-Kool played a crucial role as negotiator on behalf of the European Parliament on the Stability and Growth Pact legislation, the so-called "6pack" for European economic governance, that came into force in the end of 2011. A large part of her work focusses on increasing the stability of the financial sector. Wortmann-Kool is closely involved in legislation for banks, insurers, pension funds, hedge funds, financial markets and the European supervisors. She represents the EPP Group at the informal meetings of EPP Ministers of Finance, in preparation for the Economic and Financial Affairs (ECOFIN) Council meetings.

In the European Parliament, Wortmann-Kool served on the Economic and Monetary Affairs Committee (ECON), the Transport and Tourism Committee (TRAN) and the Committee for Women's Rights and Gender Equality (FEMM). Furthermore, she was a member of the parliamentary delegation for the United States and the parliamentary delegation for the Caucasus. Until 2009, Wortmann-Kool was the vice-chair of the Committee on International Trade and rapporteur for trade relations between the EU and China. She represented the Parliament at the 2009 United Nations Climate Change Conference in Copenhagen.

In addition to her parliamentary work, Wortmann-Kool served as vice-president of the European People's Party from 2007. In this capacity, she participated in the Monthly EPP summits of Heads of State and Government. She also chaired the EPP Working Group on enlargement (relations with centre-right parties from non-EU countries from Eastern Europe, Balkan and Caucasus; accession of new member parties EU and non-EU). She served as co-chair of the EPP Working Group on Economic and Social Policy since 2016, alongside Ireland’s Minister of State for European Affairs and Data Protection Dara Murphy.

== Other activities ==
In addition to her political work, Wortmann-Kool holds several board memberships, including the following:

- Trilateral Commission, Member of the European Group
- Mercedes-Benz Netherlands, member of the supervisory board (since 2011)
- Business Women of the Year Prize (Prix Veuve Clicquot), Member of the Jury (since 2006)

== Personal life ==
Corien Wortmann-Kool is married and has a son and a daughter. She lives in Zeist, the Netherlands.

== Career ==
- Bachelor's degree in nursing (1976–1981)
- Master's degree in political science, Free University of Amsterdam (1981–1987)
- Member of the management team in a retail company (1987–1996)
- Coordinator/senior adviser at the Ministry of Transport, Public Works and Water Management (1996–2001)
- Deputy Director of Transport and Infrastructure at the Ministry of Transport, Public Works and Water Management (2001–2004)
- Member of the administrative committee of the CDA youth organisation (CDJA) (1981–1984)
- Member of the CDA administrative committee (1987–1994)
- Member of the CDA Committee on Foreign Affairs (2003–2004)
- Member of the EPP political bureau (1989–1994)
- Member of the Zeist Municipal Council for the CDA and group chairwoman (1994–1999)
- 'Zon en Schild' Psychiatric Centre, Amersfoort, Vice-chairwoman of the Supervisory Council (1990–1999)
- Chairwoman of the Parents Association, Comenius School, Zeist (1993–1997)
