= Kartika Liotard =

Dutch politician (1971–2020)

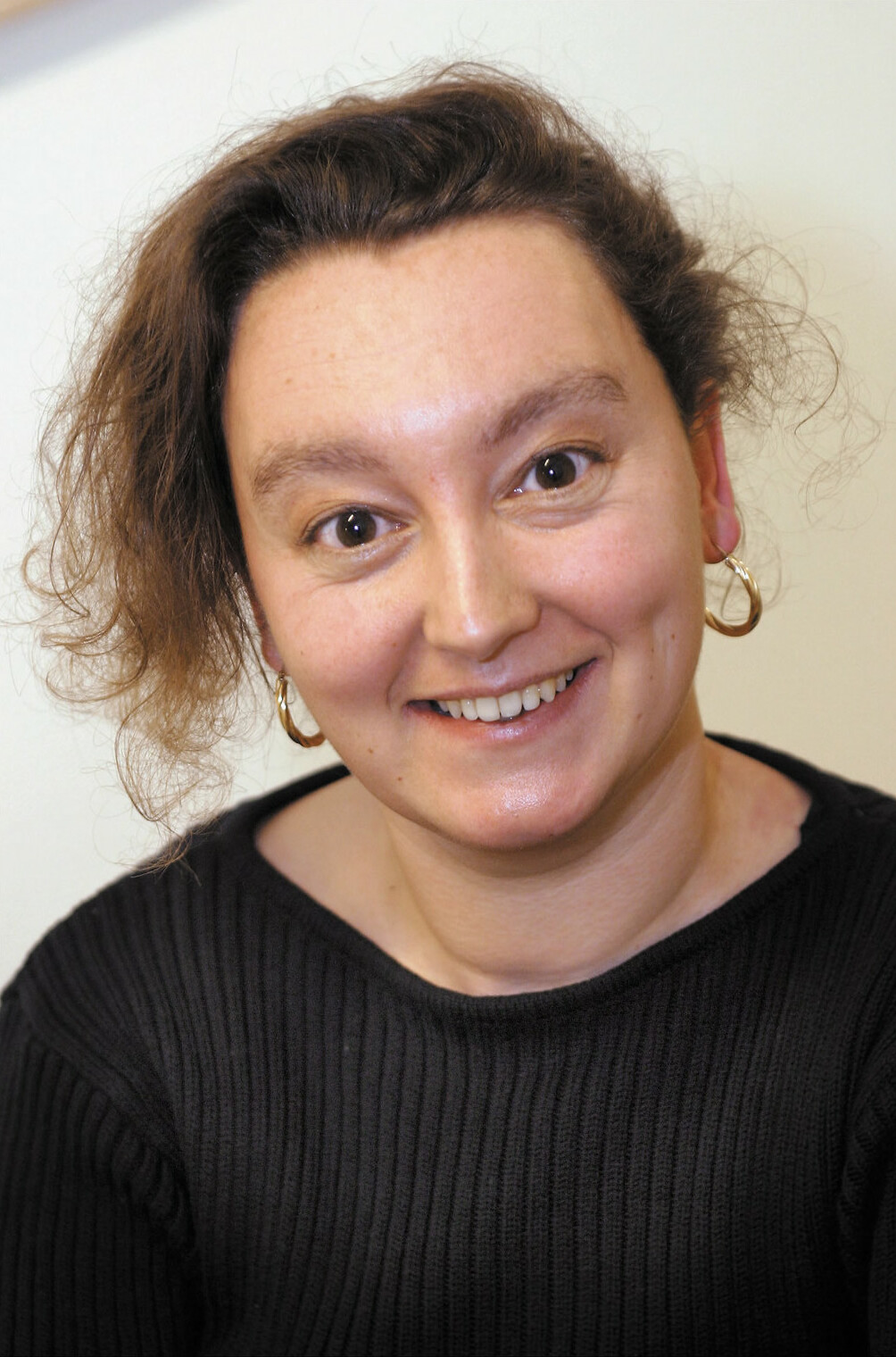
Kartika Liotard

Kartika Tamara Liotard (June 26, 1971 – August 1, 2020) was a Dutch politician who served as a member of the European Parliament (MEP) from 2004 to 2020. She was formerly a member of the Socialist Party, was vice-chair of the EUL–NGL group, and sat on the European Parliament's Committee on Agriculture and Rural Development.

She was also a substitute member of the Committee on Women's Rights and Gender Equality, the Committee on the Environment, Public Health and Food Safety, a member of the delegation for relations with the Maghreb countries and the Arab Maghreb Union (including Libya), and a substitute member for the delegation for relations with the countries of Southeast Asia and the Association of Southeast Asian Nations.

Liotard was born in Voorburg, South Holland, and studied law at Maastricht University. Before her election to the European Parliament, she worked as a legal advisor in the Dutch Ministry of Agriculture.

In September 2013, in connection with an impending vote on combating the dangers of smoking, she received a box of tobacco goods. She indignantly returned the gift because she considered it an undesirable form of lobbying.

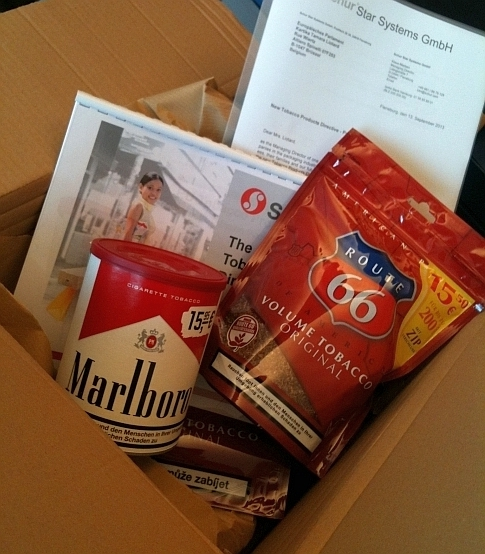
Gift offered by tobacco industry lobbyists in September 2013

Liotard died in August 2020 at the age of 49. The EUL–NGL group released a statement stating "we fondly remember Kartika for her proud fight for human rights and environmental protection."

== Books ==
- Kartika Liotard; Steven P. McGiffen (2010-02-15). Poisoned Spring: The EU and Water Privatisation. Pluto Press. ISBN 978-0-7453-2788-4.
