= List of parliamentary leaders of the Christian Democratic Appeal in the House of Representatives =

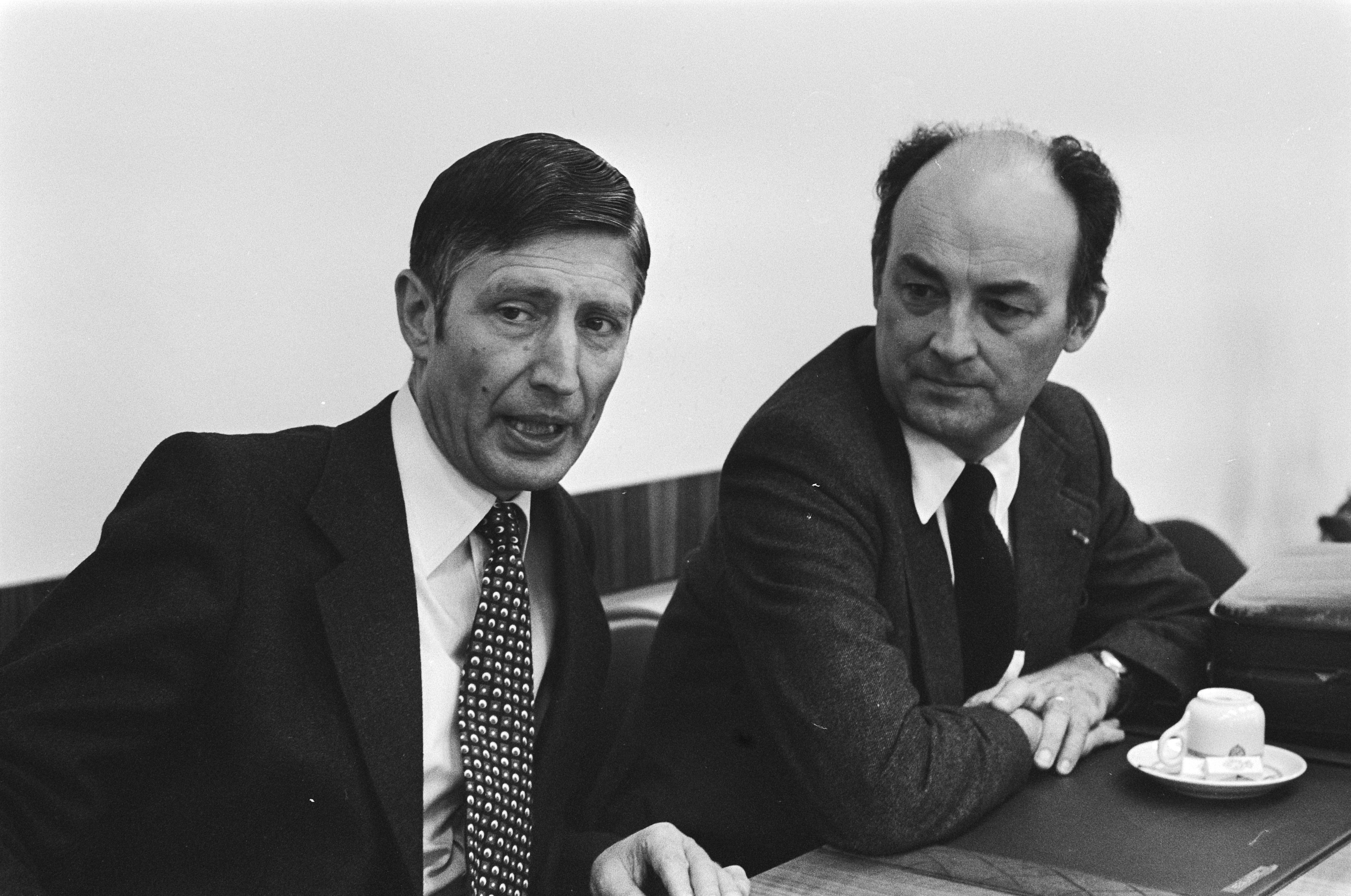
Dries van Agt and Willem Aantjes on 26 August 1977.

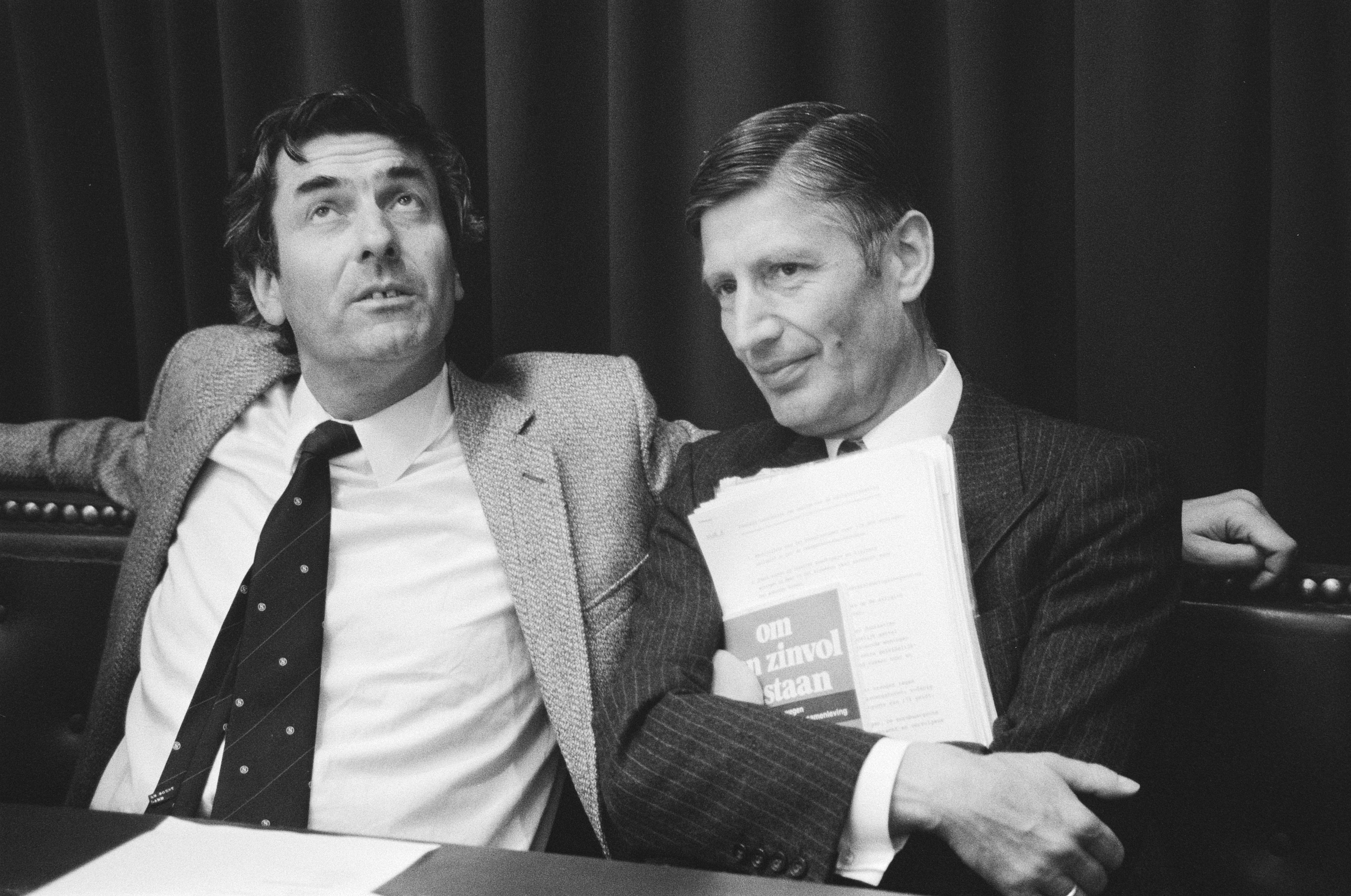
Ruud Lubbers and Dries van Agt on 23 June 1981.

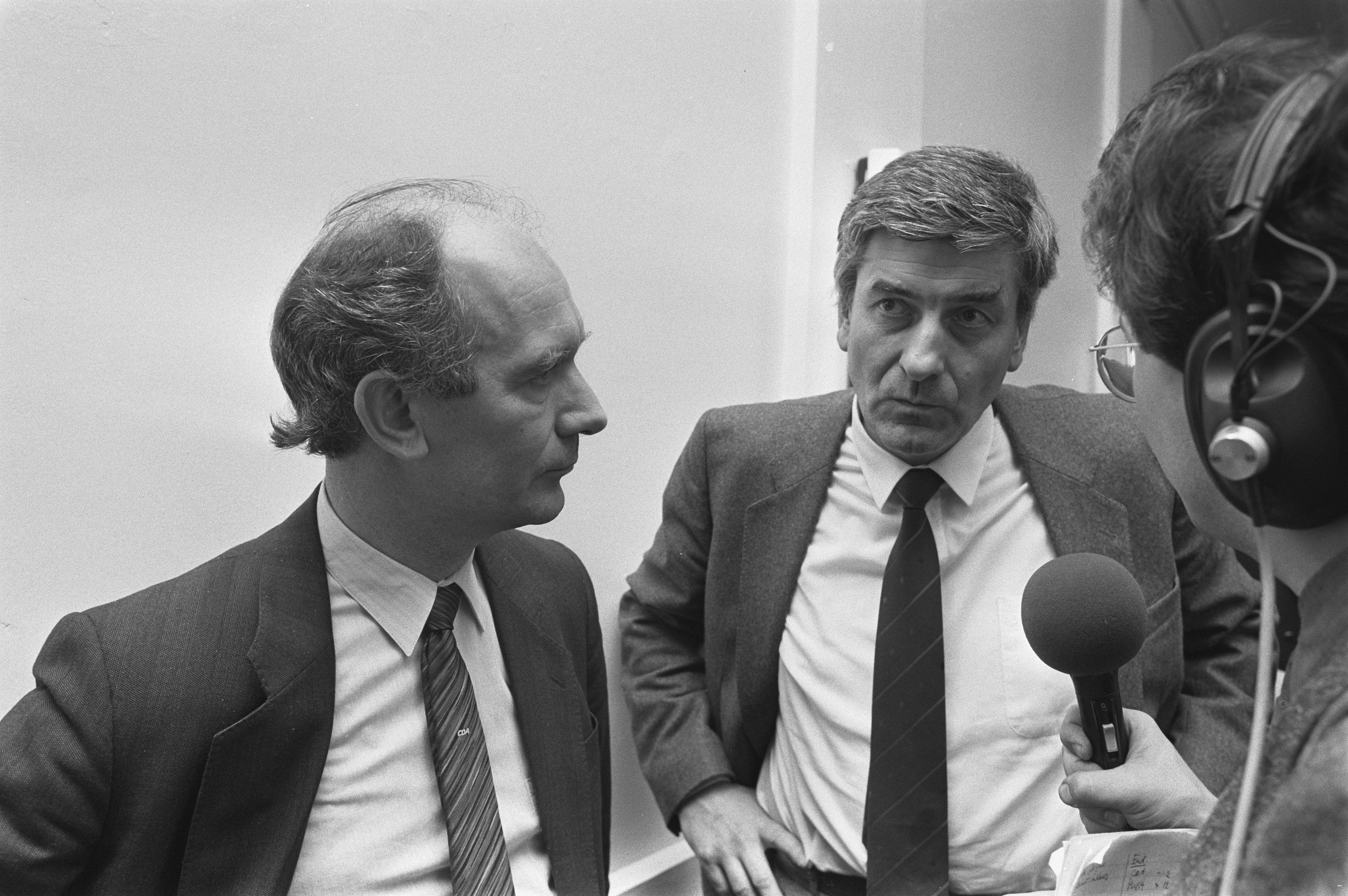
Bert de Vries and Ruud Lubbers on 19 March 1986.

This is a list of parliamentary leaders of the Dutch political party Christian Democratic Appeal (CDA) in the House of Representatives.

== List ==
| Name | Start | End | Parliamentary term | Ref. |
|---|---|---|---|---|
| Dries van Agt | 25 May 1977 | 18 December 1977 | 1977–1981 | |
| Wim Aantjes | 20 December 1977 | 6 November 1978 | 1977–1981 | |
| Ruud Lubbers | 7 November 1978 | 26 May 1981 | 1977–1981 | |
| Dries van Agt | 27 May 1981 | 23 August 1981 | 1981–1982 | |
| Ruud Lubbers | 11 September 1981 | 3 November 1982 | 1981–1982 | |
| Ruud Lubbers | 11 September 1981 | 3 November 1982 | 1982–1986 | |
| Bert de Vries | 4 November 1982 | 21 May 1986 | 1982–1986 | |
| Ruud Lubbers | 22 May 1986 | 13 July 1986 | 1986–1989 | |
| Bert de Vries | 22 May 1986 | 24 July 1986 | 1986–1989 | |
| Bert de Vries | 25 July 1986 | 6 September 1989 | 1986–1989 | |
| Ruud Lubbers | 7 September 1989 | 6 November 1989 | 1989–1994 | |
| Elco Brinkman | 7 November 1989 | 15 August 1994 | 1989–1994 | |
| Elco Brinkman | 7 November 1989 | 15 August 1994 | 1994–1998 | |
| Enneüs Heerma | 18 August 1994 | 26 March 1997 | 1994–1998 | |
| Jaap de Hoop Scheffer | 27 March 1997 | 30 September 2001 | 1994–1998 | |
| Jaap de Hoop Scheffer | 27 March 1997 | 30 September 2001 | 1998–2002 | |
| Jan Peter Balkenende | 1 October 2001 | 10 July 2002 | 1998–2002 | |
| Jan Peter Balkenende | 1 October 2001 | 10 July 2002 | 2002–2003 | |
| Maxime Verhagen | 11 July 2002 | 22 January 2003 | 2002–2003 | |
| Jan Peter Balkenende | 23 January 2003 | 20 May 2003 | 2003–2006 | |
| Maxime Verhagen | 20 May 2003 | 22 November 2006 | 2003–2006 | |
| Jan Peter Balkenende | 23 November 2006 | 20 February 2007 | 2006–2010 | |
| Maxime Verhagen | 9 February 2007 | 21 February 2007 | 2006–2010 | |
| Pieter van Geel | 22 February 2007 | 9 June 2010 | 2006–2010 | |
| Maxime Verhagen | 10 June 2010 | 11 October 2010 | 2010–2012 | |
| Sybrand van Haersma Buma | 12 October 2010 | 20 May 2019 | 2010–2012 | |
| Sybrand van Haersma Buma | 12 October 2010 | 20 May 2019 | 2012–2017 | |
| Sybrand van Haersma Buma | 12 October 2010 | 20 May 2019 | 2017–2021 | |
| Pieter Heerma | 21 May 2019 | 17 March 2021 | 2017–2021 | |
| Wopke Hoekstra | 18 March 2021 | 9 January 2022 | 2021–2023 | |
| Pieter Heerma | 10 January 2022 | 4 September 2023 | 2021–2023 | |
| Henri Bontenbal | 5 September 2023 | | 2021–2023 | |
| Henri Bontenbal | 5 September 2023 | | 2023–2025 | |
