= Joba (given name) =

Joba is a given name. Notable people with the name include:

- Joba Chamberlain, American baseball player
- Joba Majhi (born 1960), Indian politician
- Joba Murmu, Indian writer
- Joba van den Berg-Jansen (born 1958), Dutch politician

== See also ==
- Juba § People, list of people with the name Juba
