= Joba =

Joba may refer to:

- Joba, member of the hip hop group Brockhampton
- Joba (given name), includes a list of people with the name
- Joba Arriba, a town in the Dominican Republic
- Joba the sniper, Iraqi insurgent marksman known for killing a number of American soldiers
- Dominique Joba (1759–1809), French general

== See also ==
- Jobas, village in Saraqib Nahiyah, Idlib, Syria
- Juba (disambiguation)
