= Youba =

Youba is a given name. Notable people with the name include:

- Youba Diarra (born 1998), Malian footballer
- Youba Dramé (born 1998), French footballer
- Youba Hmeida (born 1976), Mauritanian sprinter
- Youba Sambou (born 1944), Senegalese politician
- Youba Sissokho (born 1991), Senegalese-born Spanish boxer

== See also ==
- Yuba (disambiguation)
