= European Commissioner for Climate, Net Zero and Clean Growth =

Member of the EU Commission

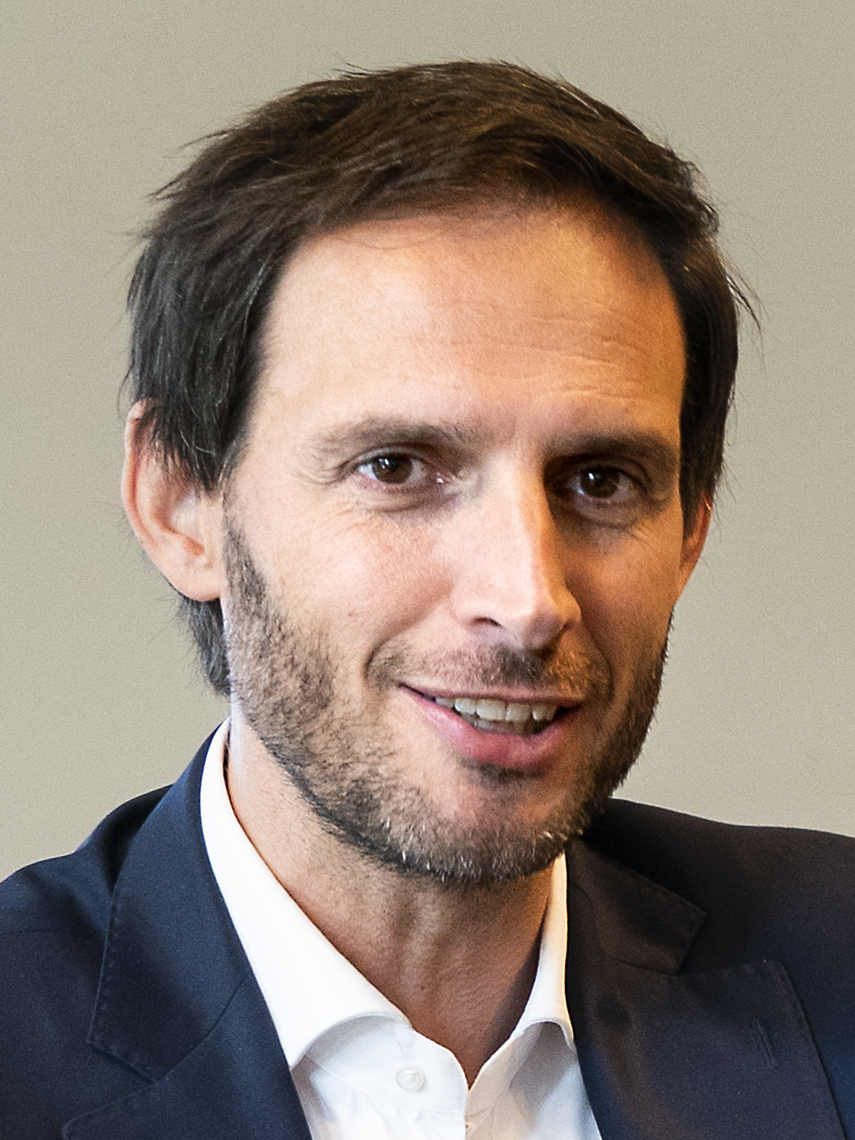
- Incumbent; Wopke Hoekstra since 9 October 2023
- Member of: European Commission
- Reports to: President of the European Commission
- Term length: 5 years
- Precursor: European Commissioner for Climate Action
- Formation: 9 February 2010; 16 years ago
- First holder: Connie Hedegaard

The European Commissioner for Climate, Net Zero and Clean Growth is a member in the European Commission. It was created in 2010, being split from the environmental portfolio to focus on fighting climate change.

The European Union has made a number of moves in regard to climate change. Most notably it signed the Kyoto Protocol in 1998, set up its Emission Trading Scheme in 2005 and most recently agreed to unilaterally cut its greenhouse gas emissions by 20% by 2020.

The current Commissioner for Climate Action is Wopke Hoekstra, who has succeeded the role after the resignation of Frans Timmermans. He also acts as Executive Vice-President of the European Commission for the European Green Deal, and vice-president for Interinstitutional Relations and Foresight.

== List of commissioners ==
No.	Picture	Commissioner for Climate Action	Took office	Left office	Time in office	Party	Country	Commission
1	Connie Hedegaard	Connie Hedegaard (born 1960)	9 February 2010	31 October 2014	4 years, 264 days	Conservatives	Denmark	Barroso II
2	Miguel Arias Cañete	Miguel Arias Cañete (born 1950)	1 November 2014	30 November 2019	5 years, 30 days	PP	Spain	Juncker
3	Frans Timmermans	Frans Timmermans (born 1961)	1 December 2019	22 August 2023	3 years, 264 days	PvdA	Netherlands	Von der Leyen
4	Maroš ŠefčovičActing	Maroš Šefčovič; Acting (born 1966)	22 August 2023	9 October 2023	48 days	Smer	Slovakia	Von der Leyen
5	Wopke Hoekstra	Wopke Hoekstra (born 1975)	9 October 2023	Incumbent	2 years, 333 days	CDA	Netherlands	Von der Leyen

== See also ==
- European Climate Change Programme
- Directorate-General for Climate Action (European Commission)
- Climate of Europe
- Energy policy of the European Union
