= North Yuba =

North Yuba may refer to:

- North Yuba AVA, an American Viticultural Area in Yuba County, California, USA.
- North Yuba River, in California

== See also ==
- Yuba (disambiguation)
