= South Yuba =

South Yuba may refer to:

- South Yuba, California, in Yuba County
- South Yuba City, California, in Sutter County
- South Yuba Canal Office, a California Historical Landmark
- South Yuba River in California

== See also ==
- South Yuba River State Park
- Yuba (disambiguation)
