= Henri Bontenbal =

Dutch politician (born 1982)

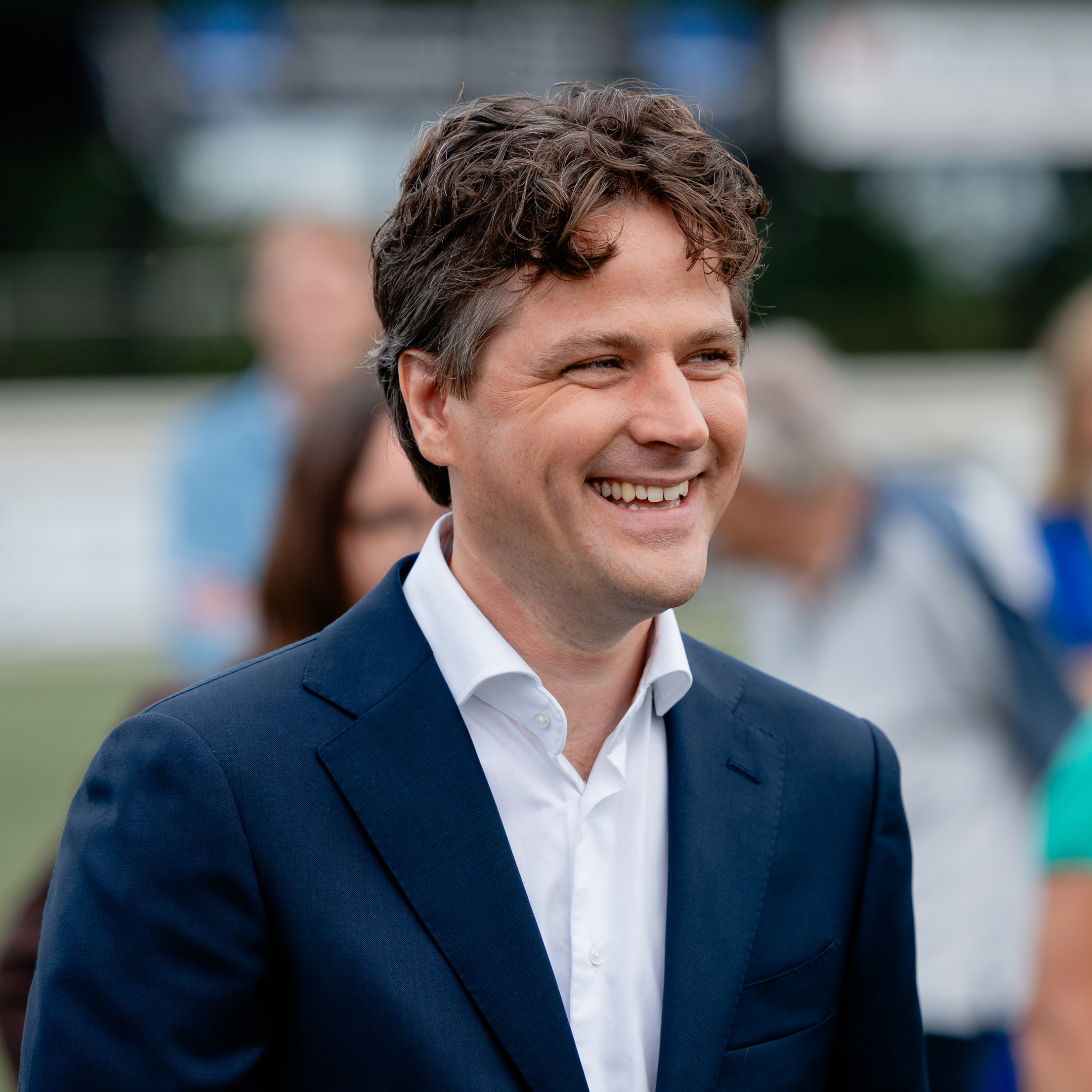
- Bontenbal in 2023

Leader of the Christian Democratic Appeal
- Incumbent
- Assumed office 14 August 2023
- Preceded by: Wopke Hoekstra

Member of the House of Representatives
- Incumbent
- Assumed office 18 January 2022
- Preceded by: Wopke Hoekstra
- In office 29 September 2021 – 27 December 2021
- Preceded by: Joba van den Berg
- Succeeded by: Harry van der Molen
- In office 1 June 2021 – 14 September 2021
- Preceded by: Pieter Omtzigt
- Succeeded by: Pieter Omtzigt

Personal details
- Born: Hendrik Bontenbal; 10 November 1982 (age 43) Rotterdam, Netherlands
- Party: Christian Democratic Appeal (2007–present)
- Children: 2
- Education: Leiden University (MSc)

Hendrik "Henri" Bontenbal (Dutch pronunciation: [ˈɦɛnri ˈbɔntə(m)bɑl]; born 10 November 1982) is a Dutch politician and energy consultant who has served in the House of Representatives since January 2022. He has been the leader of the Christian Democratic Appeal (CDA) since August 2023.

Before he became a member of parliament, Bontenbal worked in the energy sector and advised the CDA on energy issues. He participated in the 2021 general election but failed to be directly elected. In June 2021, he was first appointed to the House of Representatives as the temporary replacement of Pieter Omtzigt. He became a permanent member of parliament in January 2022 after having replaced Harry van der Molen during his sick leave.

In August 2023, Bontenbal was put forward as lead candidate of his party for the 2023 general election.

== Early life and education ==
Hendrik Bontenbal was born in Vreewijk, Rotterdam as the fourth in a family of eight children and grew up in its southern borough of IJsselmonde (initially in the Lombardijen neighborhood). His father worked as a municipal cartographer in Rotterdam. After graduating at gymnasium level from the Guido de Brès high school, he studied physics at Leiden University and he became interested in climate change mitigation in the last phase of his studies. He decided to stop flying in 2006.

== Energy career ==
Bontenbal started his career at sustainability consultancy DWA. In 2011 – after four years at DWA – he took a job as a policy officer for the CDA's caucus in the House of Representatives, focusing on sustainability, energy, and the environment. Bontenbal became an independent consultant specialized in renewable energy generation in 2013 and served at the same time as a junior fellow of the CDA's scientific bureau. In July 2015, he started working as senior strategy consultant at gas and electricity network operator Stedin. Bontenbal was placed 94th on the 2018 edition of the Duurzame 100 (Sustainable 100), a yearly list published by newspaper Trouw with the one hundred most influential Dutch people in sustainability. He had previously criticized the list, calling it elitist and lacking of people who contribute behind the scenes.

While working for Stedin, he frequently wrote op-eds and commented on energy policy in the media. He also recorded a 36-episode podcast series with energy researcher Remco de Boer in the years 2018–20 about the subject, called Bontenbal & de Boer. Bontenbal has supported an energy transition away from natural gas and has called it necessary to consider biomass and nuclear power for achieving climate goals. He has also decried political parties that have solely blamed corporations for climate change. In 2019, when the third Rutte cabinet was struggling with reactive nitrogen emissions, Bontenbal told Trouw that the CDA would not have a future if it would keep advertising itself as a party for the countryside. He explained that farmers, while important, are just one group of people, and that the CDA should have a story that resonates with the whole of society.

== Politics ==
=== First term in the House of Representatives ===
Bontenbal was the CDA's seventeenth candidate in the 2021 general election. He received 1,345 preference votes, and he was not elected, because the CDA won fifteen seats in the House of Representatives. Bontenbal was appointed to the House on 1 June 2021 as the temporary replacement of Pieter Omtzigt, who went on sick leave. He simultaneously left Stedin. His focus in the House was on climate, energy, sustainable transport, and digital affairs. Omtzigt returned to the House of Representatives from his leave on 15 September, bringing an end to Bontenbal's term. However, Bontenbal was again sworn into the House on 29 September. Joba van den Berg, who was temporarily replacing Harry van der Molen during his sick leave, became a permanent member of the body following Mona Keijzer's resignation. This caused a vacancy for Van der Molen's seat until his planned return on 28 December, which was filled by Bontenbal. After a short period without House membership, Bontenbal was sworn in for a third time – this time as a permanent House member – on 18 January 2022 as the replacement of Wopke Hoekstra, who had joined the new fourth Rutte cabinet. Bontenbal became secretary of the CDA caucus.

With the CDA's scientific institute, he presented their climate vision in September 2021. It called for a green industrial policy and for talks with major polluters to make binding agreements about reducing emissions. The document also advocated government investments in infrastructure for the hydrogen economy. That same month, he said that it might be necessary for the government to buy Tata Steel's blast furnace in IJmuiden either partly or in its entirety in order to make it more sustainable. Together with Silvio Erkens (VVD), Bontenbal pled for two new nuclear reactors – as was agreed upon in the coalition agreement – to be constructed and operated by a new state-owned company that would also seek private investment. Besides, he suggested in early 2022 to build small modular reactors to further reduce dependency on fossil fuels, calling it a promising development. While global energy prices were steeply increasing, Bontenbal and Erkens proposed five measures to relieve consumers to Minister for Climate and Energy Policy Rob Jetten in October 2022. Their recommendations included mandating energy suppliers to offer fixed contracts, forbidding them to give discounts to new customers, and subjecting them to a yearly stress test as well as strengthening consumer protections in case of bankruptcy. The CDA and VVD had been responsible for liberalizing the energy market as part of the second Balkenende cabinet. A motion by Bontenbal and Suzanne Kröger (GroenLinks) later passed the House that called on the government to prohibit door-to-door and over-the-phone sales of energy contracts. Furthermore, following a call by the Consumentenbond, Bontenbal filed a motion to force the government to investigate a potential ban on loot boxes – purchases of randomized prizes in video games – out of a concern for gambling addiction among children. It was carried by the House in July 2022.

=== CDA leader ===
As a result of disagreements about asylum reforms within the governing coalition, the fourth Rutte cabinet collapsed on 7 July 2023. Party leader Wopke Hoekstra announced days later that he would not be the lead candidate in a snap election to be held in November following disappointing results in previous elections. Polls were predicting the CDA would lose over half of its 14 House seats. The party's board nominated Bontenbal as lead candidate on 14 August. In his acceptance speech, he said that inequality had risen to high levels and that liberal and progressive parties centered around the individual, while he believed the CDA's campaign should revolve around a sense of community, values and norms, decency, solidarity, and responsibility. Commenting on the party's electoral troubles, he said that the party should have carried out its ideals more clearly and that it had compromised too much. To ensure the security of people's livelihoods, Bontenbal proposed in another speech to provide a job guarantee, support families with increased benefits, and lower income taxes through a hike in the wealth tax – revealing part of the party program. In late August, when former CDA member Pieter Omtzigt announced that he would participate with his own new party – New Social Contract – the CDA fell to three seats in polls.

When the House returned from its summer recess on 5 September, Bontenbal succeeded Pieter Heerma as the CDA's parliamentary leader. In the 2023 Dutch general election the CDA lost 10 of their 15 seats, getting the fewest number of seats in the party's history. Besides his position as parliamentary leader, Bontenbal has since served as the CDA's spokesperson for European affairs, immigration, climate, and energy. In response to the increasing number of motions filed in the House, which exceeded 5,000 for the first time in 2022, Bontenbal proposed limiting the number each parliamentary group can submit. He revised the CDA's stance on consumer fireworks at New Year by supporting a nationwide ban, citing their use in violent acts against first responders. When the right-wing Schoof cabinet presented its 2025 budget that included €2 billion in education cuts, Bontenbal formed the self-named "unholy alliance" with centrist and conservative opposition parties. To gain support in the Senate, the governing coalition agreed in December 2024 to reverse €750 million of the cuts. Bontenbal did not embrace the revised budget, declaring that they had made "a bad budget less bad". Along with Geert Wilders, he was named Dutch Politician of the Year 2024 in a poll by Goedemorgen Nederland and Ipsos I&O.

During the election campaign for the October 2025 general election, Bontenbal said in a Nieuwsuur interview that there can be friction between Articles 23 (freedom of education) and 1 (principle of equality) of the Constitution, and that this tension must sometimes be accepted. He specifically stated that religious schools are allowed to express their views and that this can lead to them rejecting gay students, and that parents in such cases can send their child to another school. He later apologized for the comments.

=== House committees ===
==== 2021–2023 term ====
- Committee for Digital Affairs
- Committee for Economic Affairs and Climate Policy
- Committee for Finance
- Committee for Intelligence and Security Services

==== 2023–present term ====
- Committee for European Affairs
- Committee for Asylum and Migration
- Committee for Climate Policy and Green Growth

== Personal life ==
Until he moved to Ridderkerk as a member of parliament, Bontenbal had lived in the southern part of Rotterdam his entire life. He met his wife Hanneke as a member of the Reformed student association CSFR. She works as a midwife in Charlois, and the couple got married in 2006. They have two sons. Bontenbal plays the piano and the saxophone, and he is a fan of Russian composer and pianist Sergei Rachmaninoff. On a 2023 campaign stop in Kampen, he played on the organ of its Bovenkerk, calling it his boyhood dream.

Bontenbal was raised as a member of the Reformed Congregations but decided to move to the Dutch Reformed Church during adolescence; he is now a member of the Protestant Church in the Netherlands. He attends the Rotterdam Pilgrim Church, but has referred to himself as Protestant with a Catholic heart. Bishop Johannes Hendriks criticized him in 2024 for receiving Holy Communion when he visited an abbey as part of a television show, as Bontenbal has not been initiated in the Catholic Church.

Bontenbal is a descendant of Claes Michielsz Bontenbal (1575–1623), who was beheaded for his role in a conspiracy against Maurice, Prince of Orange.

== Electoral history ==
Electoral history of Henri Bontenbal
Year	Body	Party	Pos.	Votes	Result		Ref.
Year	Body	Party	Pos.	Votes	Party seats	Individual	Ref.
2021	House of Representatives	Christian Democratic Appeal	17	1,345	15	Lost (Note: Bontenbal was appointed to the body later during the term due to a vacancy.)	
2023	House of Representatives	Christian Democratic Appeal	1	279,272	5	Won	
2025	House of Representatives	Christian Democratic Appeal	1	1,002,389	18	Won	

== Bibliography ==
- Het kan echt anders (in Dutch). Prometheus. 2025. ISBN 978-90-446-6077-7.

== Notes ==
Party political offices
Preceded by Wopke Hoekstra	Leader of the Christian Democratic Appeal; 2023-present	Incumbent
