= Pieter Heerma =

Dutch politician (born 1977)

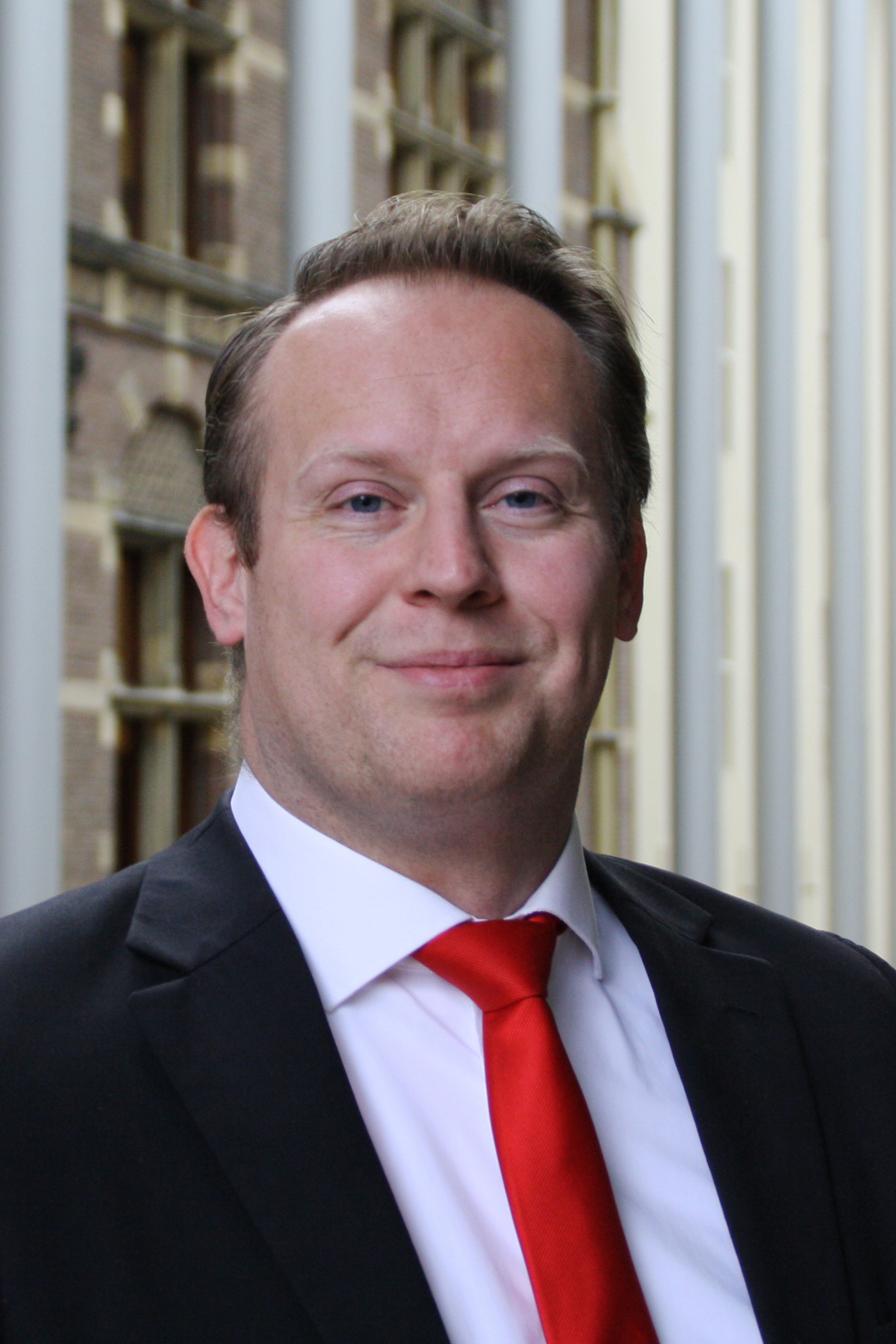
- Heerma in 2017

Minister of the Interior and Kingdom Relations
- Incumbent
- Assumed office 23 February 2026
- Prime Minister: Rob Jetten
- Preceded by: Frank Rijkaart

Leader of the Christian Democratic Appeal in the House of Representatives
- In office 11 January 2022 – 4 September 2023
- Preceded by: Wopke Hoekstra
- Succeeded by: Henri Bontenbal
- In office 21 May 2019 – 31 March 2021
- Preceded by: Sybrand van Haersma Buma
- Succeeded by: Wopke Hoekstra

Member of the House of Representatives
- In office 20 September 2012 – 5 December 2023

Personal details
- Born: Pieter Enneüs Heerma; 5 August 1977 (age 49) Amsterdam, Netherlands
- Party: Christian Democratic Appeal
- Children: 2
- Parent: Enneüs Heerma (father)
- Education: Vrije Universiteit Amsterdam
- Awards: Order of Orange-Nassau (2023)

Pieter Enneüs Heerma (born 5 August 1977) is a Dutch politician who has served as Minister of the Interior and Kingdom Relations since 2026 in the Jetten cabinet. As a member of the Christian Democratic Appeal (CDA) he was a member of the House of Representatives between 2012 and 2023. He led the party in the House of Representatives from 2019 to 2021 and again from 2022 to 2023.

== Biography ==
Heerma studied political science at the Vrije Universiteit Amsterdam from 1995 to 2001, with a specialisation in political communication. From 1999 tot 2001 he was a student assistant at Amsterdam School of Communication Research/ASCoR of the University of Amsterdam and the NIOD Institute for War, Holocaust and Genocide Studies researching the Srebrenica massacre.

From 2002 to 2007 he was a spokesperson and press officer of the CDA parliamentary group in the House of Representatives; from 2007 to 2011 he was its head of press information. From 2011 to 2012 he was head of corporate communication of the health insurance company De Friesland Zorgverzekeraar.

Heerma was CDA campaign leader for the general election of 2012. He became a member of the House of Representatives on 20 September 2012. Heerma was elected parliamentary leader of the Christian Democratic Appeal in the House of Representatives on 21 May 2019, following the nomination of Sybrand van Haersma Buma as Mayor of Leeuwarden. He remained parliamentary leader until the end of the 2017–2021 parliamentary term. For most of the 2021–2023 term he held the office again. He did not run for reelection to a fourth term as a member of the House of Representatives in 2023.

In 2026 he was appointed Minister of the Interior and Kingdom Relations in the newly-installed cabinet of Prime Minister Rob Jetten.

== Personal life ==
Heerma is married, has two sons and lives in Purmerend. He is the son of the late CDA leader Enneüs Heerma.

He is 2 metres tall, which has earned him the nickname "the big friendly giant".

== Decorations ==
Honours
Ribbon bar	Honour	Country	Date	Comment
	Knight of the Order of Orange-Nassau	Netherlands	5 December 2023	

== Electoral history ==
Electoral history of Pieter Heerma
Year	Body	Party	Pos.	Votes	Result		Ref.
Year	Body	Party	Pos.	Votes	Party seats	Individual	Ref.
2021	House of Representatives	Christian Democratic Appeal	6	1,393	15	Won	

Political offices
Preceded by Frank Rijkaart	Minister of the Interior and Kingdom Relations; 2026–present	Incumbent
Party political offices
Preceded by Sybrand van Haersma Buma	Leader of the Christian Democratic Appeal in the House of Representatives; 2019–2021; 2022–2023	Succeeded by Wopke Hoekstra
Preceded by Wopke Hoekstra	Leader of the Christian Democratic Appeal in the House of Representatives; 2019–2021; 2022–2023	Succeeded by Henri Bontenbal
