= Group of Eighteen =

The Group of Eighteen was a series of meetings of the Dutch political parties Christian Historical Union (CHU), the Anti-Revolutionary Party (ARP), and the Catholic People's Party (KVP) to explore the possibility of cooperation and ultimately forming a single Christian people's party. The first meeting took place on 24 April 1967 and the last on 22 September 1969. The discussions contributed to the formation of the Christian Democratic Appeal (CDA) in 1980.

== Members ==
=== ARP ===
- Willem Aantjes
- Wiert Berghuis
- Hans de Boer
- Hendrik van Riessen
- Antoon Veerman
- Koos Verdam

=== CHU ===
- Eddy de Geer van Oudegein
- M. Grooten-van Boven
- Gerrit Cornelis van Niftrik
- Hendrikus Albertus Schuring
- Arnold Tilanus
- R. Vermaas

=== KVP ===
- Piet Aalberse
- Leo Albering
- Jo Cals (left in November 1968)
- H.B.W.M. Gielen
- G.J.M. Horbach
- Erik Jurgens (left the Group and the KVP)
