= List of parliamentary leaders of the Christian Democratic Appeal in the Senate =

This is a list of parliamentary leaders of the Dutch political party Christian Democratic Appeal (CDA) in the Senate.

== List ==
Name	Start	End	Ref.
Johan van Hulst	8 June 1977	9 June 1981	
Jan Christiaanse	10 June 1981	24 October 1988	
Ad Kaland	26 October 1988	31 December 1993	
Luck van Leeuwen	1 January 1994	7 June 1999	
Gerrit Braks	8 June 1999	1 October 2001	
Yvonne Timmerman-Buck	2 October 2001	16 June 2003	
Jos Werner	1 July 2003	6 June 2011	
Elco Brinkman	7 June 2011	10 June 2019	
Ben Knapen	11 June 2019	23 September 2021	
Niek Jan van Kesteren	28 September 2021	21 February 2022	
Ben Knapen	22 February 2022	12 June 2023	
Theo Bovens	13 June 2023		
