= Juba (disambiguation) =

Juba is the capital of South Sudan.

Juba may also refer to:

== Locations ==
- Juba, Estonia, a village in Võru Parish, Võru County, Estonia
- Jubaland, Somalia
- Jubba River, Somalia

== People ==
Ancient

- Juba I of Numidia, King (85 BC–46 BC)
- Juba II, client King of Numidia and Mauretania (52 BC–AD 23)
- Juba (Roman metrician) (2nd century writer)
- Titus Desticius Juba (3rd century Roman governor)

Modern

- Stephen Juba (1914–1993), mayor of the city of Winnipeg, Manitoba, Canada from 1957 to 1977
- Master Juba (1825–1852), stage name for William Henry Lane
- Jussi Tuomola (born 1965), Finnish cartoonist with the pen name Juba
- Juba (sniper), a nickname associated with a supposed sniper involved with the Iraqi insurgency
- Juba Kalamka (born 1970), African American bisexual artist and activist

== Other ==
- Juba Arabic
- Juba dance
- Juba skipper (Hesperia juba), a butterfly
- "Juba", a song by DJ Spooky from the album Songs of a Dead Dreamer
- Juba (food), a New World slave food
- Juba, the Latin name of the star Gamma Leonis
- Alternate spelling of the jubba, a type of garment

== See also ==
- Joba (disambiguation)
- Yuba (disambiguation)
