= Juba (food) =

Juba was a food that was traditionally eaten by slaves in the United States colonies who worked on plantations. It was made up of a mixture of leftovers and was cooked in a large pot. Often, leftovers came from the plantation slaves, and were given largely to the slaves working the fields to consume. Additionally, juba was often labeled slop, as its ingredients were indistinguishable from one another. To make consumption psychologically easier, the slaves created a song that sounded to their masters like merriment, but held a more ominous double meaning.

"Juba dis and juba dat, and juba killed da yellow cat, You sift the meal and ya gimme the husk, you bake the bread and ya gimme the crust, you eat the meat and ya gimme the skin, and that’s the way, my mama’s troubles begin."

There are countless variations on the lyrics, but the first two lines almost always remain the same.
