= Joba van den Berg =

Dutch politician (born 1958)

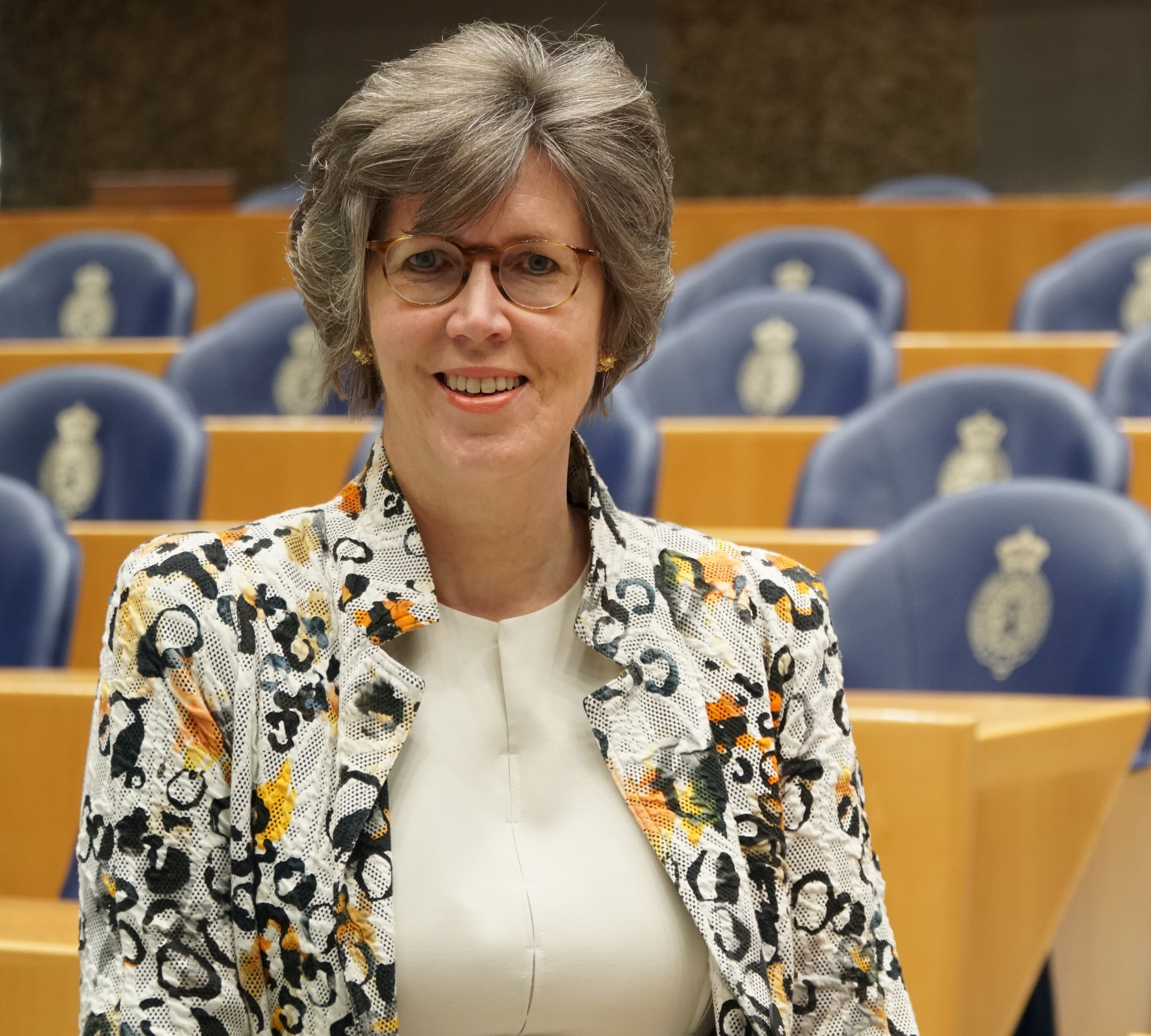
Joba van den Berg in the House of Representatives in 2017

Jacoba Antonia Maria Joanna "Joba" van den Berg-Jansen (born 21 August 1958) is a Dutch politician for Christian Democratic Appeal (CDA). She was a member of the House of Representatives from 23 March 2017 to 31 March 2021, from 29 April 2021 to 17 August 2021 and again from 7 September 2021 to 5 December 2023.

== Electoral history ==
Electoral history of Joba van den Berg
Year	Body	Party	Pos.	Votes	Result		Ref.
Year	Body	Party	Pos.	Votes	Party seats	Individual	Ref.
2017	House of Representatives	Christian Democratic Appeal	18	3,551	19	Won	
2021	House of Representatives	Christian Democratic Appeal	16	2,808	15	Lost (Note: Van den Berg was appointed to the body later during the term due to a vacancy.)	
2023	House of Representatives	Christian Democratic Appeal	35	151	5	Lost	
