= Yuba =

Yuba may refer to:

== Places ==
- Yuba City, California
- Yuba County, California
  - North Yuba AVA, California wine region in Yuba County
- Yuba River, a major river in California
- Yuba State Park, in Utah
- Yuba, Michigan
- Yuba, Wisconsin
- Yuba, a village in Shawo Township, Echeng District, Ezhou, Hubei

== Other ==
- Yuba (food), one of the names of tofu skin, an East Asian food made from soybeans
- YUBA Liga, the premier basketball league of Serbia and Montenegro (named after Yugoslavia)
- Yuba College, the main campus for the Yuba Community College District in Marysville, California, United States
- Yuba Airport, Grand Traverse County, Michigan, United States
- Yuba County Airport, Yuba County, California, United States
- Yuba, fictional town in the manga One Piece

== See also ==
- North Yuba (disambiguation)
- South Yuba (disambiguation)
- Juba (disambiguation)
- Elizabeth Murphy Taaffe (née Elizabeth Yuba Murphy; 1844–1875), American rancher and early settler in Los Altos, California
