= Christian Democratic Appeal =

Political party in the Netherlands

Christian Democratic Appeal Christen-Democratisch Appèl
- Abbreviation: CDA
- Leader: Henri Bontenbal (list)
- Chairperson: Jean Wiertz (list)
- Leader in the Senate: Theo Bovens (list)
- Leader in the House of Representatives: Henri Bontenbal (list)
- Leader in the European Parliament: Jeroen Lenaers
- Founded: 23 June 1973 (pre-federation); 11 October 1980 (party)
- Merger of: Catholic People's Party; Anti-Revolutionary Party; Christian Historical Union
- Headquarters: Buitenom 18, The Hague
- Youth wing: Christian Democratic Youth Appeal
- Think tank: Wetenschappelijk Instituut voor het CDA
- Membership (2026): ▲28,891
- Ideology: Christian democracy Conservatism
- Political position: Centre-right
- Regional affiliation: Christian Group
- European affiliation: European People's Party
- European Parliament group: European People's Party Group
- Colours: Sea green (customary); Green (official)
- Senate: 6 / 75
- House of Representatives: 18 / 150
- Provincial councils: 42 / 570
- European Parliament: 3 / 31
- Benelux Parliament: 2 / 21

Website
- cda.nl

The Christian Democratic Appeal (Dutch: Christen-Democratisch Appèl [ˌkrɪstə(n)deːmoːˈkraːtis ɑˈpɛl], CDA) is a Christian democratic (Note: Multiple sources: Kees Van Kerbergen; André Krouwel (2013). "A double-edged sword! The Dutch centre-right and the 'foreigners issue'". In Tim Bale (ed.). Immigration and Integration Policy in Europe: Why Politics – and the Centre-Right – Matter. Routledge. pp. 91–92. ISBN 978-1-317-96827-6.; Wijbrandt H. Van Schuur; Gerrit Voerman (2010). "Democracy in Retreat? Decline in political party membership: the case of the Netherlands". In Barbara Wejnert (ed.). Democratic Paths and Trends. Emerald Group Publishing. p. 28. ISBN 978-0-85724-091-0.; Christopher Anderson (1995). Blaming the Government: Citizens and the Economy in Five European Democracies. M.E. Sharpe. p. 64. ISBN 978-1-56324-448-3.; Nordsieck, Wolfram (2021). "Netherlands". Parties and Elections in Europe.) and conservative (Note: Multiple sources: "Netherlands profile - Timeline". BBC News. 12 December 2022.; Camut, Nicolas (16 March 2023). "Dutch pro-farmers party wins big in provincial elections". Politico.; "Dutch to vote in Covid-dominated election". France24. 15 March 2021.; Hardy, Catherine (9 October 2017). "Dutch coalition partners agree government deal". Euronews.; "Netherlands poll surprise: Anti-EU parties fall short". Deutsche Welle (DW). 24 May 2019.) political party in the Netherlands.

Formed as a federation in 1975 by the Catholic People's Party, the Anti-Revolutionary Party, and the Christian Historical Union, it first participated in a general election in 1977 and unified into a single party in 1980. The party dominated Dutch politics from 1977 to 1994, becoming the largest party all but twice, with leaders Dries van Agt and Ruud Lubbers serving as prime minister.

The party faced a major defeat in the 1994 general election, after which the first two cabinets without its participation were formed. The CDA regained its status as the largest party between 2002 and 2010, during which leader Jan Peter Balkenende headed four cabinets. Between 2010 and 2023, the party saw further electoral decline under varied leadership, participating in three of four cabinets as a junior coalition partner. Following the 2025 general election, the party holds 18 seats; it is now led by Henri Bontenbal.

== History ==
=== Founding ===
==== Predecessor parties ====
Since 1880, Catholics and the Protestant Anti-Revolutionary Party (ARP) collaborated in the so-called Coalition. They shared a common goal of securing public funding for religious schools, which was achieved through the Pacification of 1917. In 1888, they established the first Christian democratic cabinet, the Mackay cabinet. This cooperation, however, was not without challenges, and in 1894, more anti-Catholic and aristocratic conservatives split from the ARP to form what would become the Christian Historical Union (CHU) in 1908. Within both parties, there remained a desire to reunite. Meanwhile, in 1904, the General League of Roman Catholic Caucuses was formed, eventually evolving into the Roman Catholic State Party (RKSP) in 1926 and later the Catholic People's Party (KVP) in 1945.

During the Interwar period, all three parties remained continuously in government. After World War II, however, the KVP distanced itself from the CHU and especially the ARP, refraining from governing with them until 1952 and 1958, respectively, instead forming Roman/Red cabinets with the Labour Party (PvdA). Meanwhile, the parties began collaborating at the European level, with the CHU and ARP joining the KVP in the Nouvelles Equipes Internationale in 1953. Due to secularisation and depillarisation, the three parties lost their combined majority (Note: They held a total of 75 of the 150 seats.) in the 1959 general election for the first time since 1918.

==== Merger talks ====
Influenced by the Second Vatican Council, the KVP published the report Grondslag en karakter van de KVP (transl. Foundation and Character of the KVP) and adopted its conclusions, which called for Christian democratic cooperation, in December 1966. The Night of Schmelzer in October 1966 exposed divisions both between and within the three parties, leading to disappointing election results for each. Consequently, the three parties accepted an ARP initiative to form the Group of Eighteen in April 1967, comprising six prominent politicians from each party, tasked with establishing a common foundation for Christian politics and, if successful, determining the best path forward.

Meanwhile, Christian-radical members within the three parties grew dissatisfied with their support in the 1967 general election, as they favored cooperation with progressive parties over alignment with the People's Party for Freedom and Democracy (VVD) in the De Jong cabinet. To prevent this group from disrupting party cooperation, the leaders of the three parties announced on 14 February 1968 that in the next election, they would either unite into a single Christian party or only join the cabinet together. This announcement led a group of KVP radicals to leave the party the same month, founding the Political Party of Radicals (PPR). Two years later, a group of ARP radicals also left to establish the Evangelical Progressive Party (EVP).

In 1969, the Group of Eighteen proposed drafting a joint "urgency programme," which the parties completed shortly before the 1971 general election, where they again lost seats. Following up on the Group of Eighteen, the Contact Council was established in 1972 to further develop their cooperation. Led by KVP Senator Piet Steenkamp, the council issued a memorandum in June 1972, advocating a single candidate list for the next election and the formation of a Christian democratic movement, with membership open to members of the three parties as well as direct members.

A month later, however, the first Biesheuvel cabinet collapsed, leaving insufficient time to prepare a single candidate list, resulting in another loss in the 1972 general election. As part of its polarisation strategy, the PvdA persuaded several KVP and ARP politicians to join its progressive Den Uyl cabinet during the 1972–1973 cabinet formation. This arrangement required their parliamentary groups to provide confidence and supply, while the CHU moved into opposition. This shift complicated the merger process, as the CHU stipulated that a joint list would depend on the "actual parliamentary political situation" (the so-called "political mortgage").

==== Federation ====
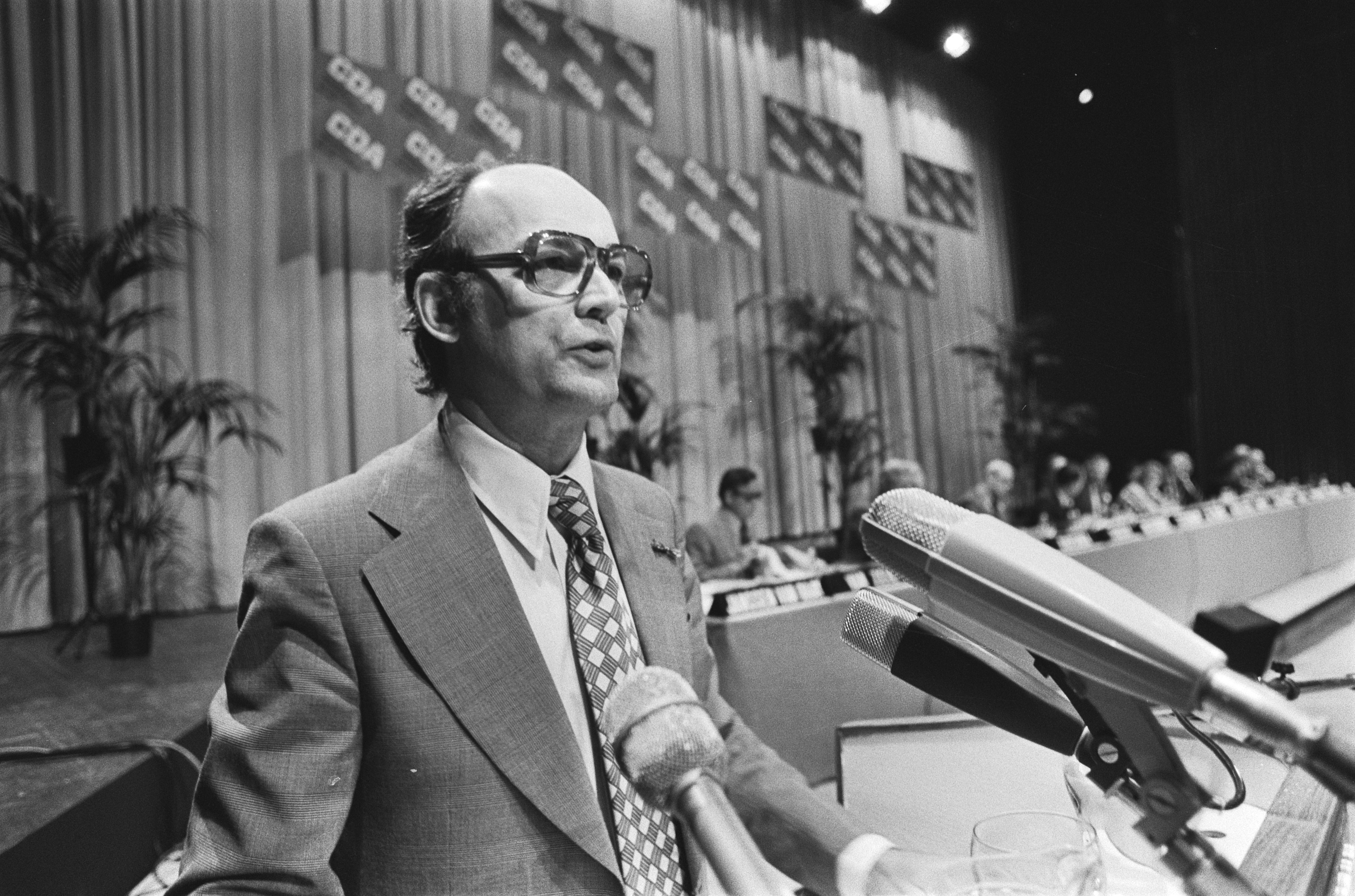
ARP leader Willem Aantjes held a speech during the first CDA convention in 1975 in which he argued for the importance of the evangelical guidelines in the party. The speech became known as his sermon on the mount.

Nevertheless, based on the memorandum, the Christian Democratic Appeal was officially formed as a pre-federation in 1973, with Steenkamp as its chairperson. It would employ a "growth model", in which they would work out political and organizational details, while keeping the original parties until the last moment. Meanwhile discussions continued on the role of the Bible in the party and the political course. When the pre-federation was turned into a federation in 1975, some conservative members of the CHU and ARP left to form the Reformatory Political Federation (RPF).

=== Van Agt cabinets, 1977–1982 ===
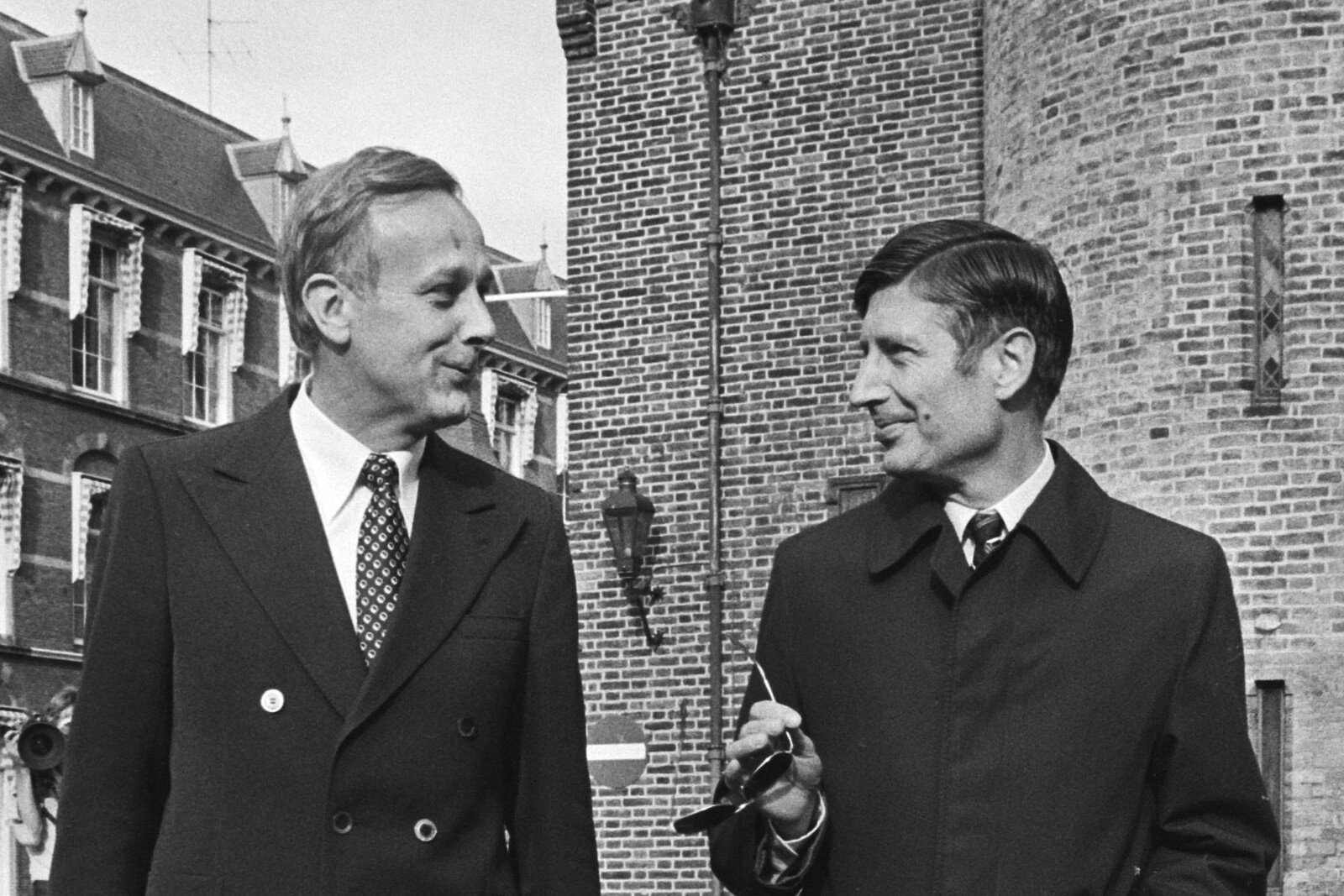
The CDA's founder and inaugural chairman Piet Steenkamp (left) and inaugural party leader and Prime Minister Dries van Agt (right) in 1977

In 1976, the three parties announced that they would field a single candidate list at the 1977 general election, after their parliamentary groups had intensified cooperation. KVP minister of Justice Dries van Agt was the lead candidate. The election manifesto was titled "Not by bread alone" (Dutch: Niet bij brood alleen) and was progressive. The list was able to get one seat more than the three parties together five years earlier. Based on the results, a cabinet of PvdA, CDA and Democrats 66 (D66) was most likely and was discussed at the start of the 1977 cabinet formation. After seven months, the negotiations finally collapsed, after it had been suspended multiple times. Soon after, Van Agt was able to form the first Van Agt cabinet with the conservative liberal People's Party for Freedom and Democracy (VVD).

Some progressive MPs nicknamed the loyalists, which included parliamentary leader Willem Aantjes, did not commit to support the cabinet, but only tolerated it. Their opposition forced the cabinet to compromise on the placement of nuclear weapons in the Netherlands. This issue would continue to divide the party until it was resolved in the 1980s and would contribute to the removal of loyalists Jan Nico Scholten and Stef Dijkman from the parliamentary group in 1983. Nevertheless, the first Van Agt cabinet was able to complete its term.

The federation was founding member of the European People's Party on 8 July 1978. For the 1979 European Parliament election, they had first selected Wim Vergeer (KVP), but after Ruud Lubbers (KVP) had replaced Aantjes as parliamentary leader, Bouke Beumer (ARP) was selected. CDA won ten out of 25 seats and was the largest Dutch delegation to distribute the leadership between the parties.

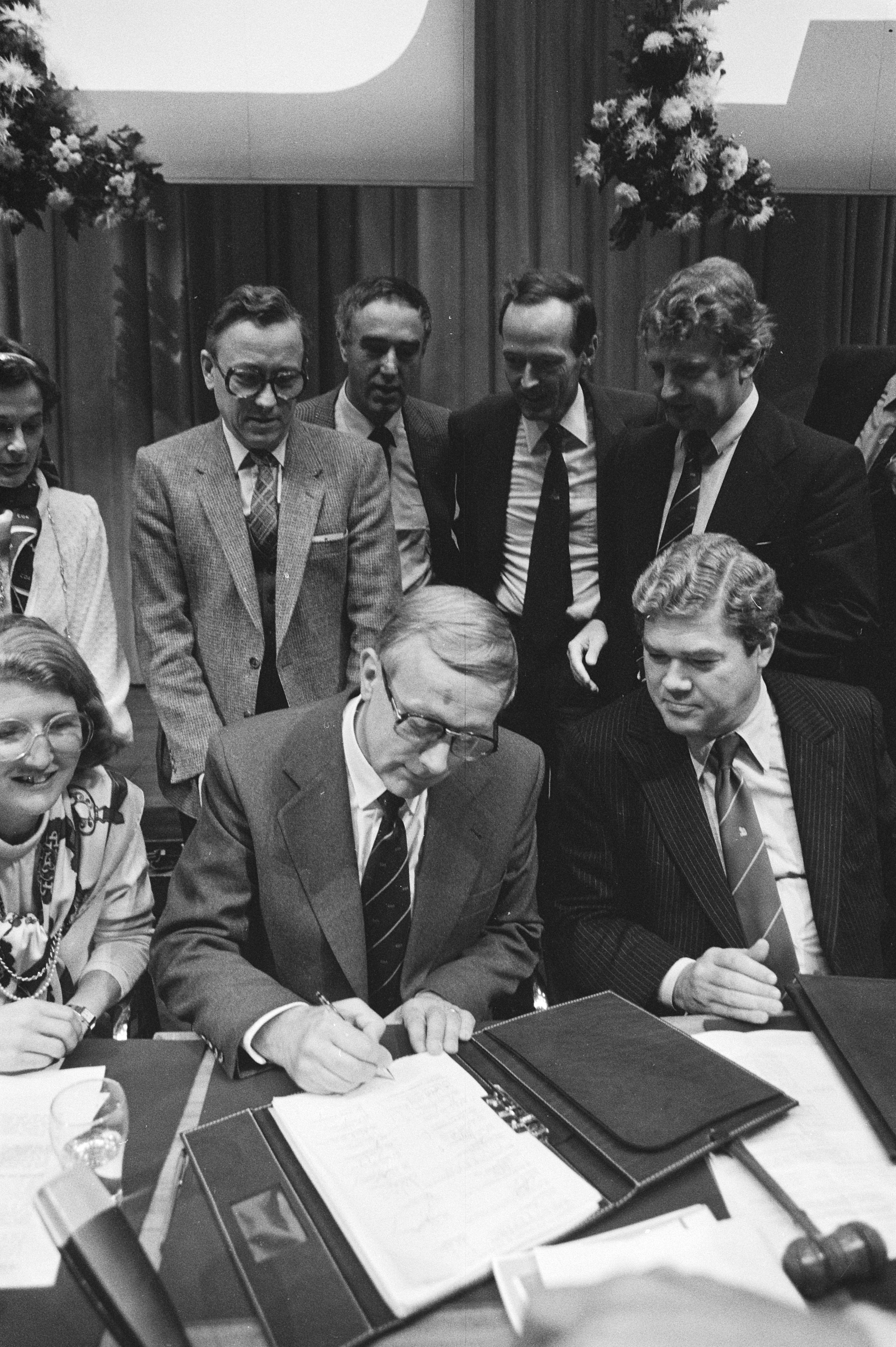
Outgoing CDA party chair Piet Steenkamp signing the merger during the merger convention on 11 October 1980 with to the right vice-chair Jim Janssen van Raaij and to the left Madeleen Leyten. Behind them are from right to left the party chairs: Piet Bukman (incoming CDA), Luck van Leeuwen (CHU), Hans de Boer (ARP) and Piet van Zeil (KVP).

On 11 October 1980, the three original parties ceased to exist and the CDA was founded as a unitary party. The differences between the groups would continue to exist for a long time within the party. It led to another group of members leaving the party and joining with the EPV to found the Evangelical People's Party (EVP).

For the 1981 general election, Van Agt was reelected as lead candidate. Its election manifesto was titled "For a meaningful existence" (Dutch: Om een zinvol bestaan) and compared to the previous manifesto shifted responsibility from the government to society. CDA became the largest party, despite losing a seat. Because CDA and VVD had lost their majority, the second Van Agt cabinet with PvdA and D66 was formed in the 1981 cabinet formation. Bad relations between PvdA and CDA led to crises from the start, and the cabinet fell within a year. Van Agt led the rump cabinet Van Agt III with D66 to prepare the next election.

=== Lubbers cabinets, 1982–1994 ===
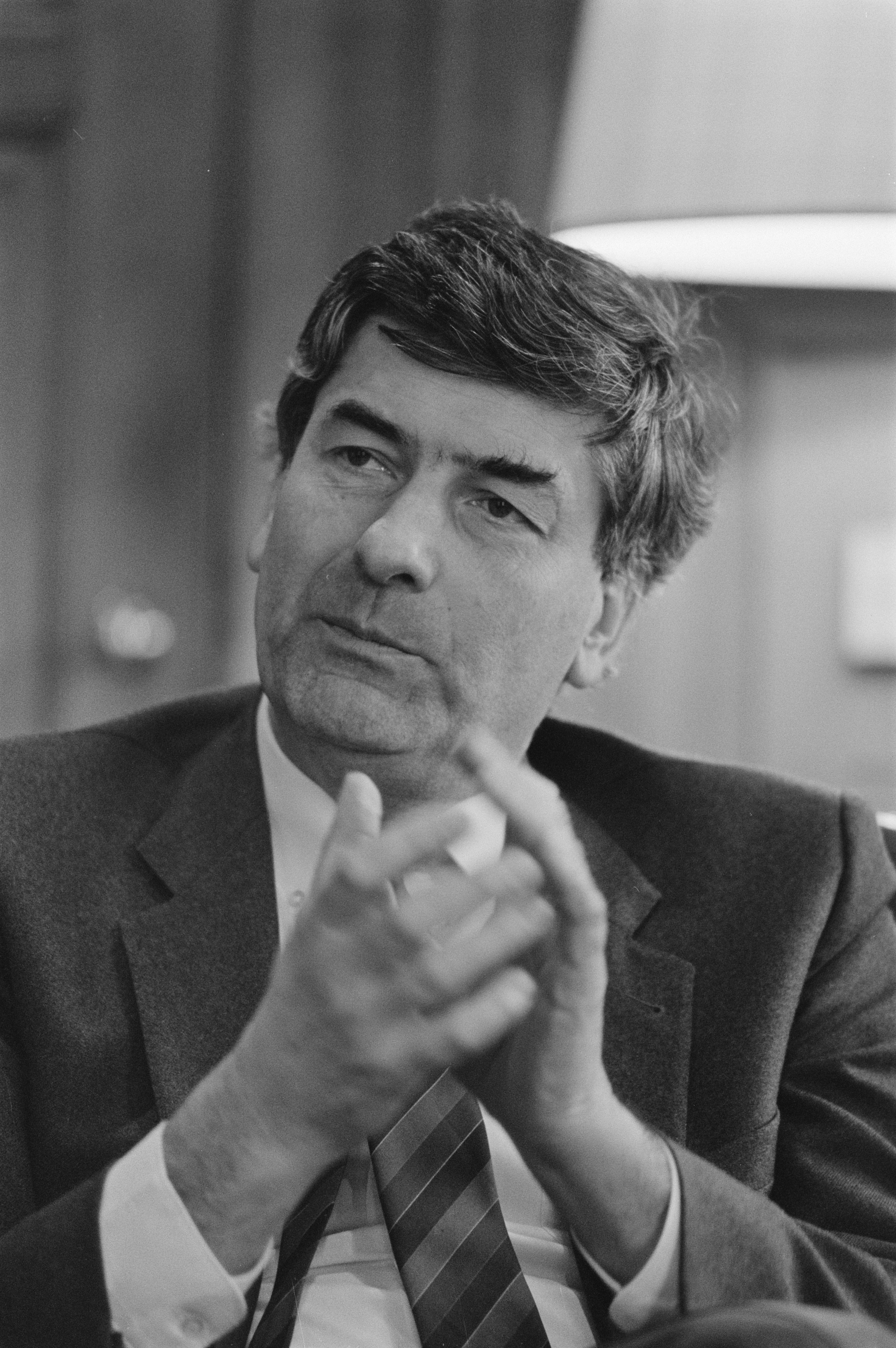
Ruud Lubbers, party leader and Prime Minister from 1982 until 1994.

Van Agt was again lead candidate for the general election and its manifesto was the same as the previous year with an attachment. CDA lost three seats and ended second after PvdA. After the elections, Van Agt announced that he would leave politics and was succeeded as party leader by Lubbers. During the September–November 1982 cabinet formation, Lubbers would form the first Lubbers cabinet with the VVD. To combat the economic crisis, the cabinet implemented budget cuts, limited the welfare state and privatised state-owned companies. A major achievement was the Wassenaar Agreement in 1982, in which trade unions agreed to wage moderation in exchange for reduction of working hours by employers' organisations. This would be the start of the polder model, a concept in line with CDA's principle of distributed responsibility.

The 1986 general election took place when the economy was improving, but the manifesto nevertheless focused on reducing the welfare state and shifting the responsibility to society. Given Lubber's popularity for his "no-nonsense approach", the slogan was "Let Lubbers finish his job" (Dutch: Laat Lubbers zijn afmaken). CDA won 54 seats, the highest a single party had ever won, mostly at the expense of the VVD. After the 1986 cabinet formation, the second Lubbers cabinet continuing with VVD as coalition partner. VVD felt like being in the supporting role, and finally brought down the cabinet in 1989 over the travel expenses allowance.

The manifesto for the 1989 general election built upon the previous with the addition of environmental management among the priorities. The CDA kept its 54 seats and after the 1989 cabinet formation the third Lubbers cabinet was formed with the PvdA. A notable reform in line with the CDA principle of distributed responsibility, was the privatization of the housing associations by CDA State Secretary for Housing, Spatial Planning and the Environment Enneüs Heerma, with which he started in 1989 and was finished in 1994.

=== Opposition to Purple, 1994–2002 ===
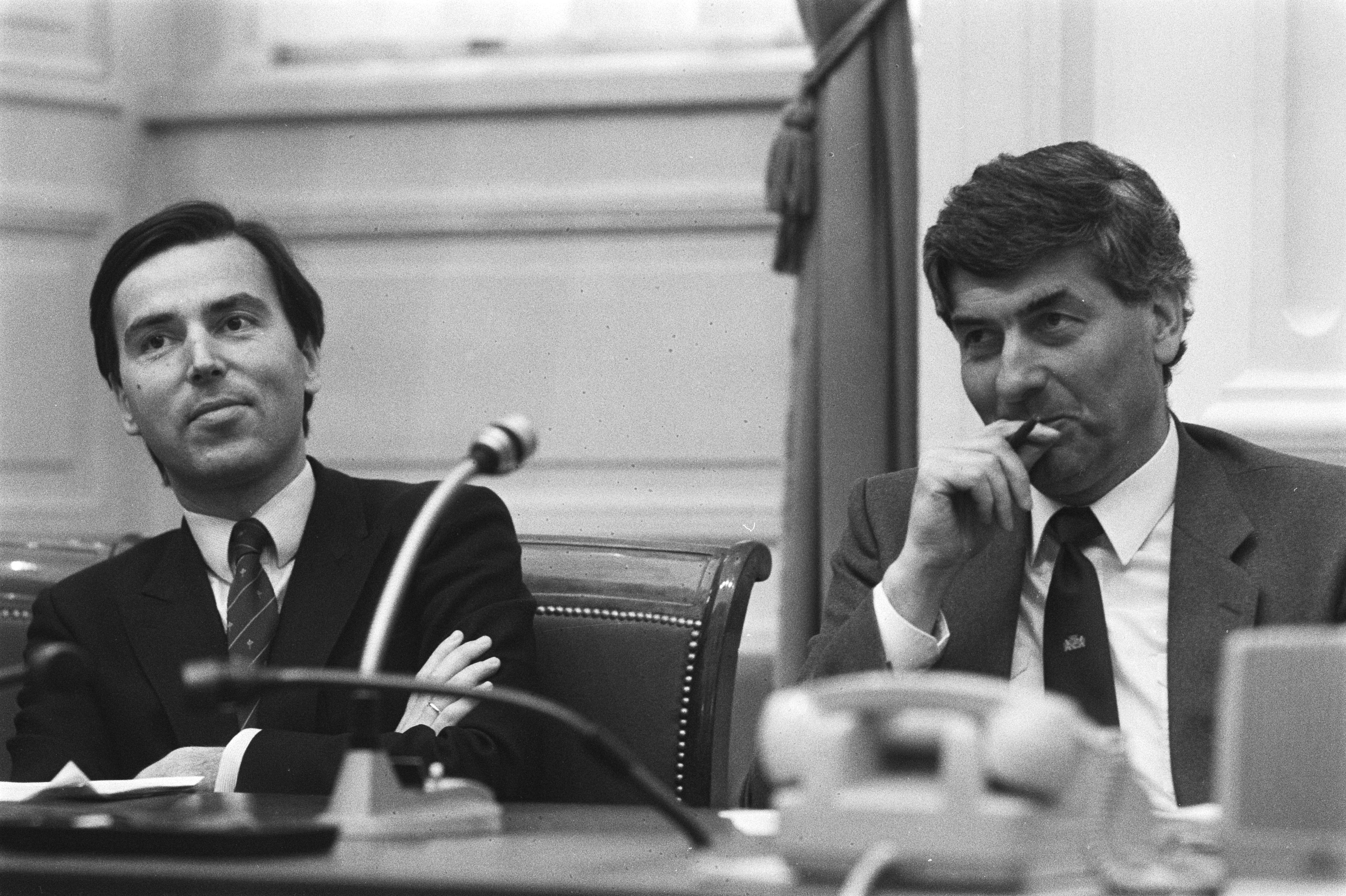
Elco Brinkman and Ruud Lubbers during a debate in 1984.

In the run-up to the 1994 general election, Lubbers announced he would retire from Dutch politics and had named Elco Brinkman his successor. During the campaign, Lubbers appeared to distance himself from Brinkman. Furthermore, the freezing of pensions they had included in their manifesto proved unpopular with its elderly voters. CDA lost 20 of its 54 seats. The 1994 cabinet formation led to the first purple coalition, the first time since 1918 that CDA or its predecessors were not part of a cabinet. Enneüs Heerma succeeded Brinkman as parliamentary leader and attempted to be the voice of the opposition and bring the topic of family on the political agenda, but failed in both.

Jaap de Hoop Scheffer was selected as lead candidate for the 1998 general election. The election manifesto "You don't live together alone" (Dutch: Samenleven doe je niet alleen) differed from previous ones, focusing on communitarianism in contrast to the individualism of the purple coalition. However, De Hoop Scheffers was relatively unknown compared to his opponents, and the CDA, as a centrist party, struggled to simultaneously target both the left-wing PvdA and the right-wing VVD. It led to another loss of five seats and a continuation of the cabinet without CDA.

=== Balkenende cabinets, 2002–2010 ===
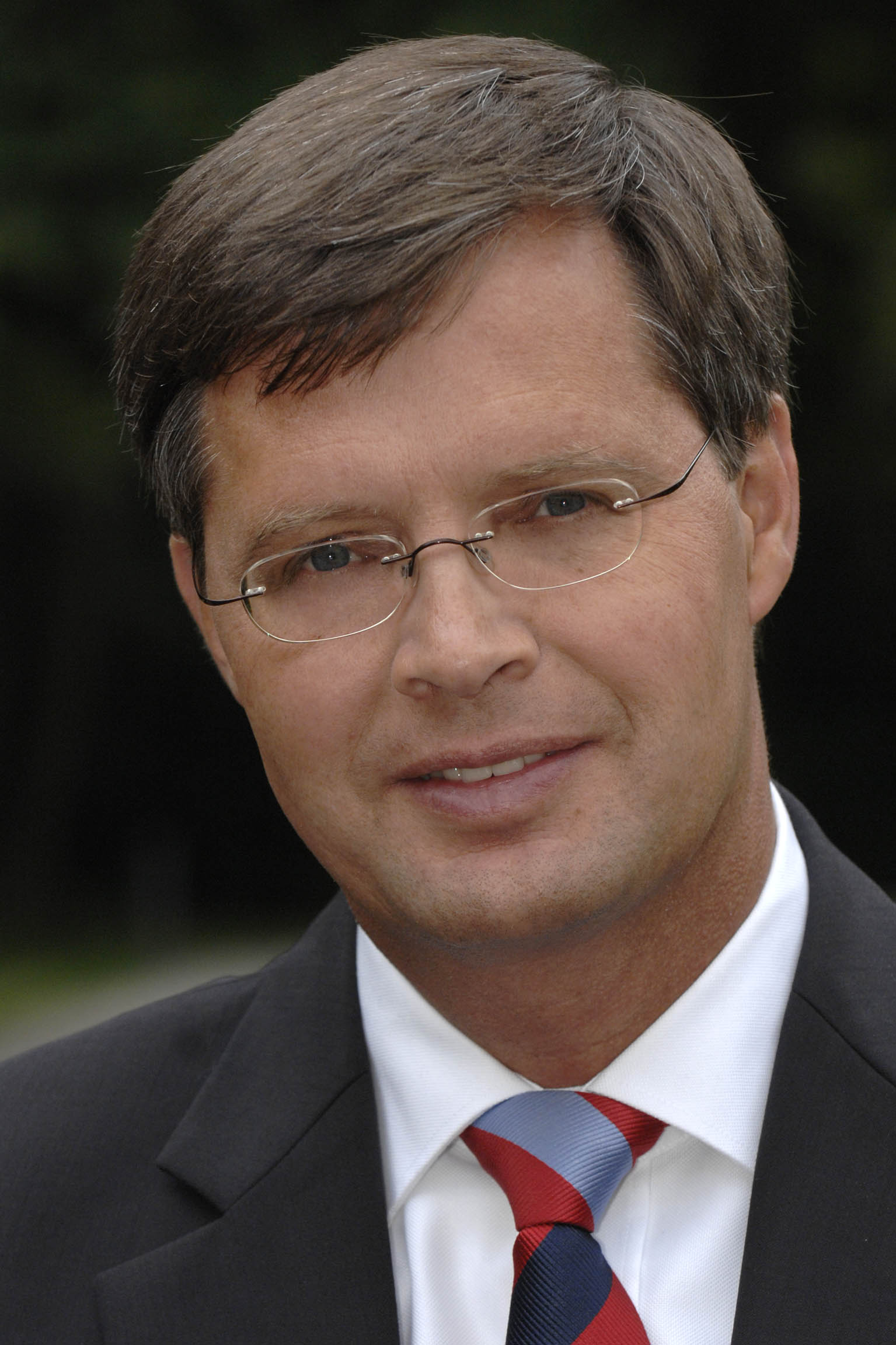
Jan Peter Balkenende, party leader from 2001 until 2010 and Prime Minister from 2002 until 2010.

In the run-up to the 2002 general election, a leadership crisis erupted between party leader De Hoop Scheffer and party chair Marnix van Rij, after which they both left. De Hoop Scheffer was succeeded as lead candidate by Jan Peter Balkenende. The campaign was dominated by the right-wing politician Pim Fortuyn and Pim Fortuyn List (LPF) with his critique of the purple cabinets. Fortuyn and Balkenende had agreed not to attack each other during the campaign. Near the end of the campaign, Fortuyn was assassinated, which led to civil unrest. In the election, many people voted for the CDA, hoping that it could bring stability and because it had not attacked Fortuyn like many other parties. CDA became the largest party with 43 seats, followed by LPF with 26 seats. In the 2002 cabinet formation, the first Balkenende cabinet was formed with CDA, VVD and LPF. The cabinet would fall after only three months due to struggles within the LPF.

CDA won another seat in the 2003 general election and remained the largest party. CDA started negotiations with PvdA in the 2003 cabinet formation, but after this failed, the second Balkenende cabinet was formed with VVD and D66. To comply with the deficit limits of the European Stability and Growth Pact, the cabinet cut back on social security, leading to protest within CDA. A major reform, which was started under the previous cabinet, was the introduction of a new system of health care insurance plan, which made an end to the distinction between public and private healthcare insurance funds, with the aim of reducing costs and waiting lists. The cabinet fell in 2006 after D66 left, leading to the formation of the third Balkenende cabinet as rump cabinet with VVD.

CDA lost three seats, but remained the largest party after the 2006 general election. In the cabinet formation it formed the fourth cabinet Balkenende with PvdA and the Christian Union (CU). The cabinet was confronted with the 2008 financial crisis, leading to the nationalisation of some banks. CDA and PvdA disagreed a lot, and PvdA finally left the cabinet in 2010.

=== Rutte cabinets, 2010–2023 ===
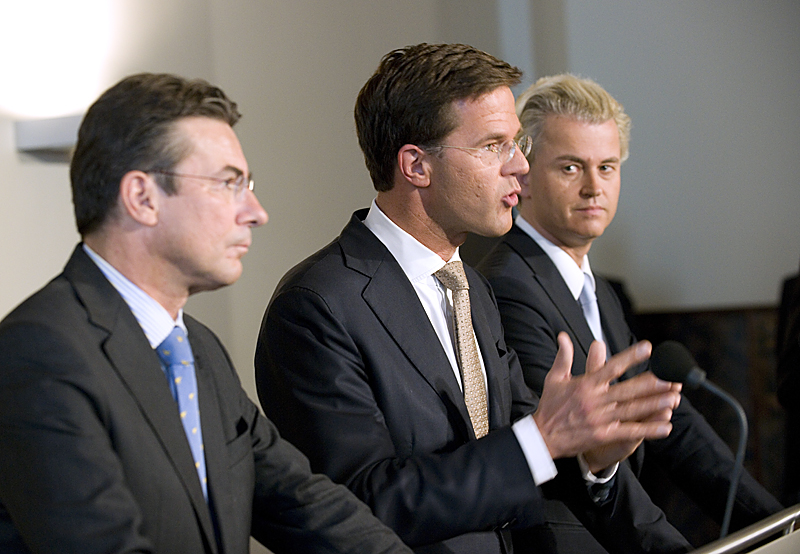
Maxime Verhagen (left) with VVD party leader Mark Rutte and PVV Geert Wilders during the presentation of the coalition agreement after the 2010 cabinet formation.

Despite open internal opposition, Balkenende was again selected as lead candidate for the 2010 general election, in which CDA lost half of its seats. Balkenende announced his resignation as party leader and was replaced by Maxime Verhagen. At first, Verhagen was aiming for opposition during the 2010 cabinet formation. However, after talks between purple plus collapsed, CDA entered negotiations with VVD and Party for Freedom (PVV), the latter would be providing confidence and supply. Within the party, some opposed a coalition with the radical right PVV. Verhagen's co-negotiator Ab Klink resigned over the negotiations and two other MPs threatened to oppose the coalition, which would make it lose its majority. A special party convention was held to approve the result of the negotiations, which 68% of the record 4,700 members did. On 14 October, the first Rutte cabinet was sworn in with Verhagen as Deputy Prime Minister.

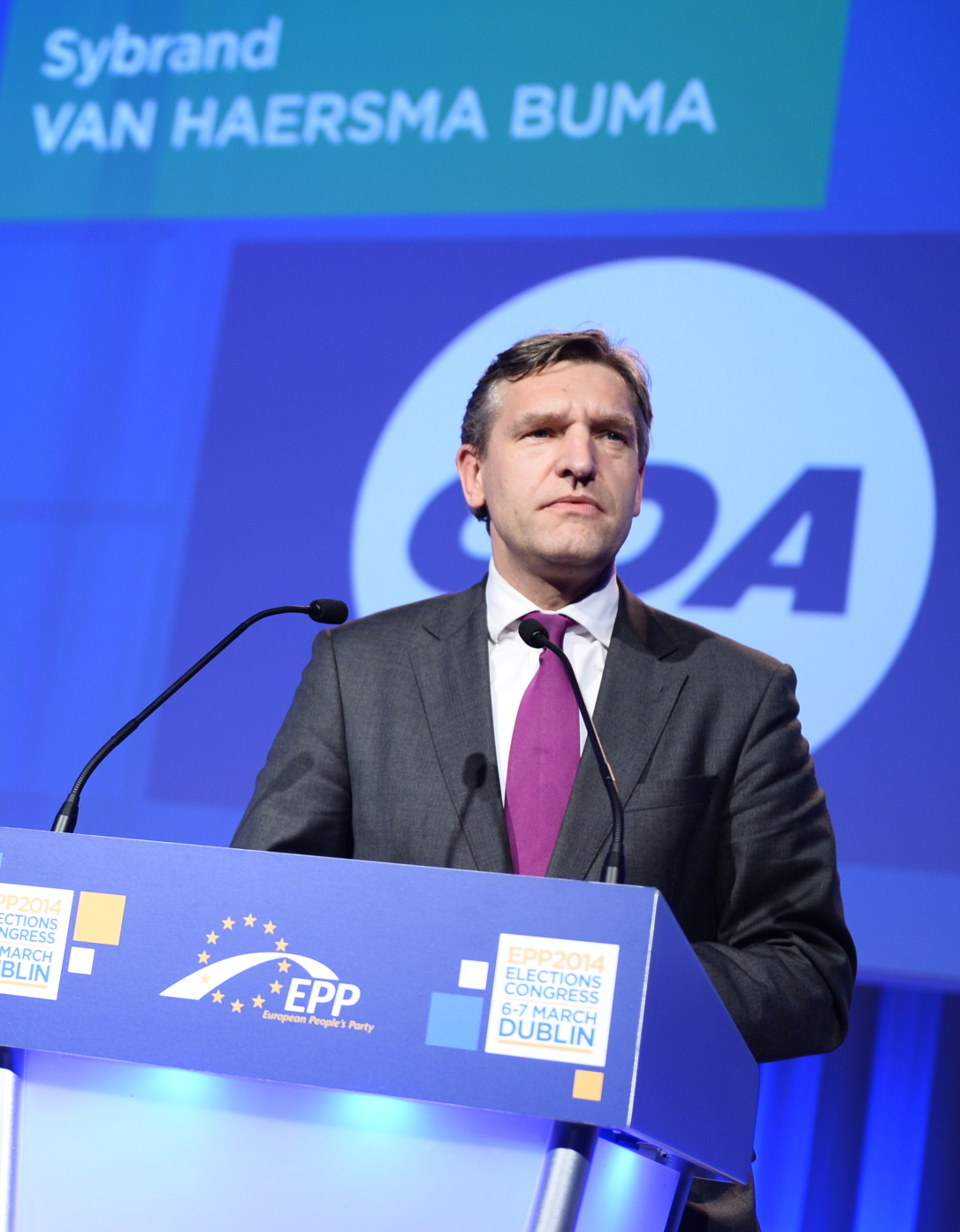
Sybrand van Haersma Buma, party leader from 2012 until 2019.

After the fall of the short-lived first Rutte cabinet in 2012, CDA held a leadership election, which was won by interim parliamentary leader Sybrand Buma, with runner-up Mona Keijzer receiving 26% of the votes. The election manifesto for the 2012 general election was titled "Everyone" (Dutch: Iedereen) after a Strategic Deliberation had advised a position in the "radical centre", focusing on all layers of society. In the election, CDA fell to 13 seats. CDA played no role in the 2012 cabinet formation which lead to the second Rutte cabinet and also stayed out of agreements the coalition made with opposition parties. In opposition, Buma followed a right-conservative line, embracing the "angry citizen" and focusing on norms and values.

Its manifesto for the 2017 general election, "Choices for a better Netherlands", focused on norms and values, Dutch identity, insecurities and opposed excessive individualism. The CDA gained sixed seats and joined the third Rutte cabinet, with the VVD, D66 and CU.

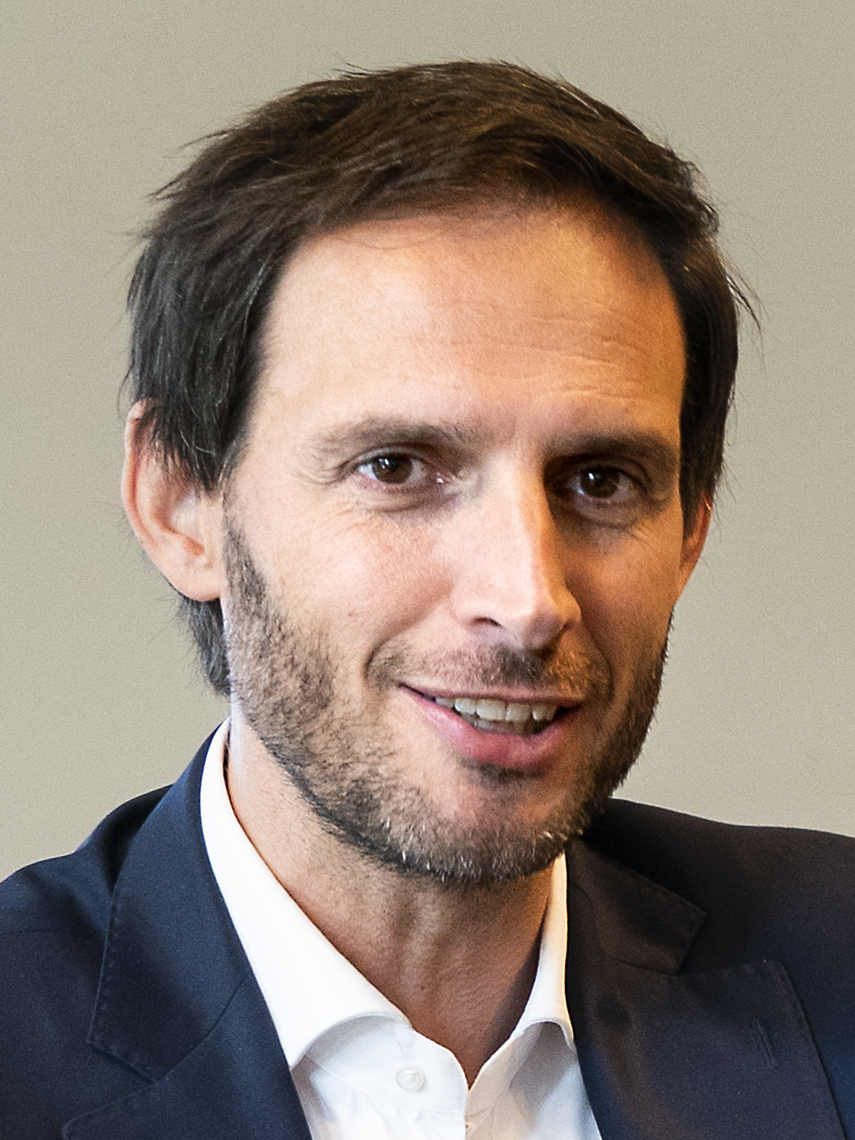
Wopke Hoekstra, party leader from 2021 until 2023.

Buma resigned in May 2019 and was succeeded temporarily by Pieter Heerma as parliamentary leader. A leadership election did not take place until July 2020. The chaotic election was narrowly won by Deputy Prime Minister and Minister of Health, Welfare and Sport Hugo de Jonge, with MP Pieter Omtzigt as runner-up. De Jonge withdrew as lead candidate in December, because he could not combine it with his duties as minister during the COVID-19 pandemic. In his place, the party board appointed Minister of Finance Wopke Hoekstra.

The party lost four seats in the March 2021 election. After the longest ever cabinet formation the party continued in fourth Rutte cabinet, which had the same composition as the previous. During the formation, Omtzigt had left the party, alleging he had been treated unfairly in the party, and later started the party New Social Contract (NSC). During the cabinet period, the party struggled with its position in the nitrogen crisis and the farmers' protests that followed. The party faced electoral competition from the new political party Farmer–Citizen Movement (BBB) on this issue.

=== Opposition, 2023–2026 ===
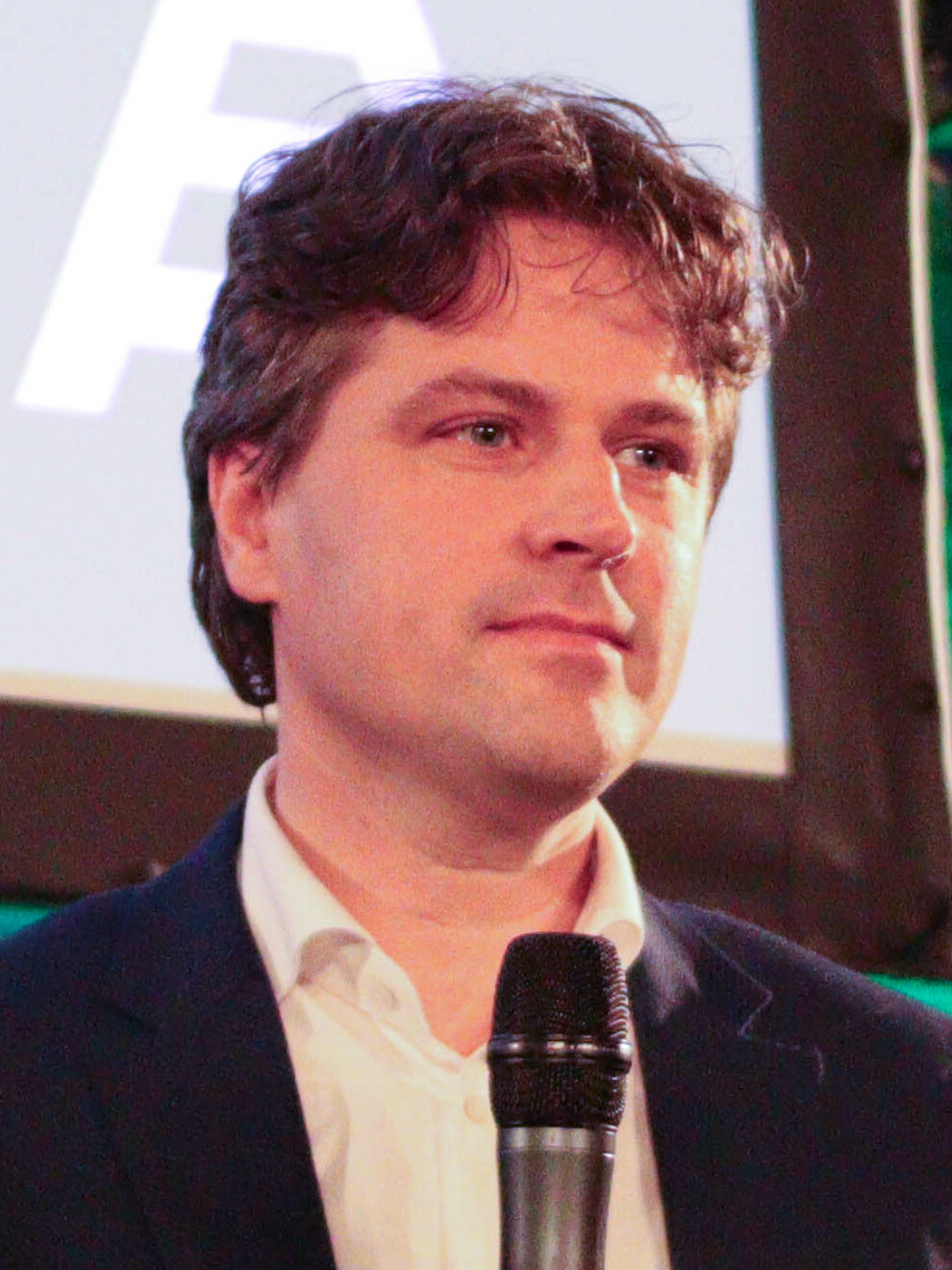
Henri Bontenbal, party leader since August 2023.

For the November 2023 general election, MP Henri Bontenbal was selected as party leader. The party received its worst result ever, securing only five seats.

== Political positions ==
The CDA is a centre-right party (though some sources class it as centrist or centre to centre-right). It is ideologically Christian democratic and conservative. It started relatively progressive compared to other European Christian democratic parties or secular conservative parties, but followed the general trend in Dutch politics in becoming more conservative and centre-right. As of 2022, social conservatism is regarded as one of its guiding ideologies. The party had long been reluctant to call itself conservative, but it has been embraced by Bontenbal in 2023. It has become more communitarianist, in particular under Balkenende's leadership, who was inspired by sociologist Amitai Etzioni.

Although traditionally a centrist party, with both conservatives and progressives within its ranks, the CDA shifted rightwards during the Nineties. As noted by one study

By the end of the decade, few commentators would continue to refer to the CDA as a true “centrist” party. While the party continued to contain a progressive wing, the balance of power had shifted so clearly towards those who espoused a more conservative view on welfare reform that left-leaning voices were effectively sidelined.

The party has four main principles: stewardship, solidarity, distributed responsibility and public justice. Distributed responsibility refers to the way society should be organised: no one organisation should control all society. Instead the state, the market, and social institutions, like churches and unions should work together. It is a combination of the neo-Calvinist concept of sphere sovereignty and the Catholic concept of subsidiarity.

=== Economic issues ===
==== Role of the government ====
Following the principles of distributed responsibility, CDA has always focused on a "responsible society", where intervention by the government should be limited. To achieve this, CDA cherishes civil society. In its 1977 election manifesto, it ascertained that Dutch society was not yet a real responsible society, and that the government should help society achieve this. In the 1980s, CDA concluded that the government spending levels were unsustainable and focused on budgets cuts and reducing the welfare state. In the 1990s, its confidence in and expectations of society grew, as well in the responsibility of individual citizens. Notable reforms in this direction have been the privatisation of the housing associations in 1994 and the healthcare reform in 2006.

==== Environment ====
CDA supports the protection of the environment based on the principle of stewardship. It aims to reconcile the protection of the environment with economic growth, although the latter often prevailed.

=== Social issues ===
==== Abortion ====
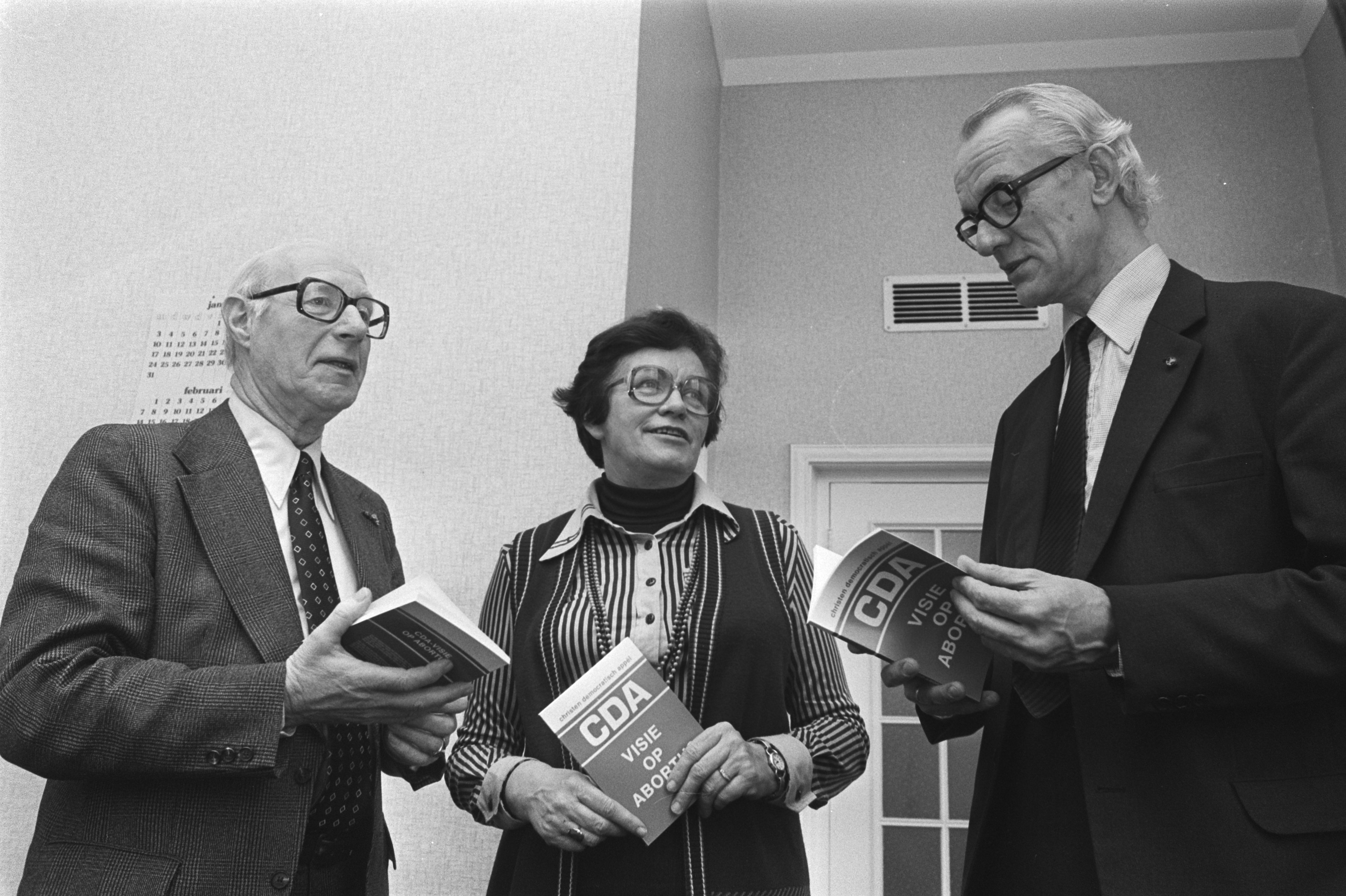
CDA members Arnold Tilanus (CHU), Dien Cornelissen (KVP) and Gerrit van Dam (ARP) with the book "CDA: Vision on abortion" (Dutch: CDA: Visie op abortus) in 1977.

CDA has always held a middle position in the debate on abortion in the Netherlands, advocating for "no unless". CDA supports the right to abortion when the life of the woman is in danger. It has accepted since its creation that a majority in the Netherlands was in favor of abortion beyond that, arguing that their own ethical values should not be codified in law. CDA is however in favor of some limitations, including abortion being in the Criminal Code and a reflection period of five days. A majority of its representatives voted for the compromise abortion law in 1981, while a majority voted against the removal of the mandatory reflection period in 2021.

==== LGBT rights ====
Today, CDA supports same-sex marriage in the Netherlands, although it did not do so early on. In the beginning, CDA opposed same-sex marriage, but supported the registration of other forms of cohabitation. This was more explicitly mentioned in election manifestos after its think tank published its report 1+1=together in 1986. In 1997, CDA voted against a bill that would allow civil union for same-sex relationships, because it would also be open to opposite-sex relationships. In 2000, all but three CDA members of parliament voted against the introduction of same-sex marriage. (Note: Among the three members voting in favour of same-sex marriage was Joop Wijn, who would become the first Dutch openly gay minister.) Since then, CDA became more supportive of same-sex marriage, voting in favour of a law giving married lesbians the same parenting rights as opposite-sex parents.

In May 2019, the CDA voted against banning gay conversion therapy, arguing that conversion therapy is already punishable as abuse and too broadly formulated.

=== International affairs ===
==== Europe ====
Based on the Chapel Hill expert survey (2014), CDA can be qualified as "Eurorealist", while it had been more pro-European in the past. In its party manifesto in 1980, the CDA strove for a "united Europe" and in 1979 they had endorsed the EPP election manifesto which called for a federal Europe. In the early 2000s CDA started emphasizing the national identity, writing in its 2004 election manifesto it wanted "to ensure that we do not lose our own Dutch identity in the larger Europe". A turning point was the 2005 referendum on the Treaty establishing a Constitution for Europe, which was voted down. CDA had officially endorsed the Treaty, but Balkenende was largely absent during the campaign. The focus shifted to the national interest in Europe. Around the same that the EPP started to distance itself from a federal Europe in its new party manifesto, CDA wrote in its manifesto for the 2014 European Parliament election the party "is and remains against a federal Europe". It turned against enlargement of the European Union, which it had supported in the previous decade.

== Election results ==
=== House of Representatives ===
Vote share of CDA and its predecessors since 1918 in general elections.

Election	Lead candidate	List	Votes	%	Seats	+/–	Government	Ref.
1977	Dries van Agt	List	2,653,416	31.9	49 / 150	▲1	Coalition	
1981	Dries van Agt	List	2,677,259	30.8	48 / 150	▼1	Coalition	
1982	Dries van Agt	List	2,420,441	29.4	45 / 150	▼3	Coalition	
1986	Ruud Lubbers	List	3,172,918	34.6	54 / 150	▲9	Coalition	
1989	Ruud Lubbers	List	3,140,502	35.3	54 / 150	Steady	Coalition	
1994	Elco Brinkman	List	1,996,418	22.2	34 / 150	▼20	Opposition	
1998	Jaap de Hoop Scheffer	List	1,581,053	18.4	29 / 150	▼5	Opposition	
2002	Jan Peter Balkenende	List	2,653,723	27.9	43 / 150	▲14	Coalition	
2003	Jan Peter Balkenende	List	2,763,480	28.6	44 / 150	▲1	Coalition	
2006	Jan Peter Balkenende	List	2,608,573	26.5	41 / 150	▼3	Coalition	
2010	Jan Peter Balkenende	List	1,281,886	13.6	21 / 150	▼20	Coalition	
2012	Sybrand Buma	List	801,620	8.5	13 / 150	▼8	Opposition	
2017	Sybrand Buma	List	1,301,796	12.4	19 / 150	▲6	Coalition	
2021	Wopke Hoekstra	List	990,601	9.5	15 / 150	▼4	Coalition	
2023	Henri Bontenbal	List	345,822	3.3	5 / 150	▼10	Opposition	
2025	Henri Bontenbal	List	1,246,874	11.8	18 / 150	▲13	Coalition	

=== Senate ===
Election	List	Votes	Weight	%	Seats	+/–	Ref.
1977 (Note: 11 seats as a stand-alone party.)	List				24 / 75	▼5	
1980	List				27 / 75	▲3	
1981	List				28 / 75	▲1	
1983	List				26 / 75	▼2	
1986	List				26 / 75	Steady	
1987	List				26 / 75	Steady	
1991	List				27 / 75	▲1	
1995	List				19 / 75	▼8	
1999	List				20 / 75	▲1	
2003	List		46,848	29.0	23 / 75	▲3	
2007	List		43,501	26.7	21 / 75	▼2	
2011	List	86	24,260	14.6	11 / 75	▼10	
2015	List	89	25,145	14.9	12 / 75	▲1	
2019	List	76	19,756	11.4	9 / 75	▼3	
2023	List	47	13,136	7.3	6 / 75	▼3	

=== European Parliament ===
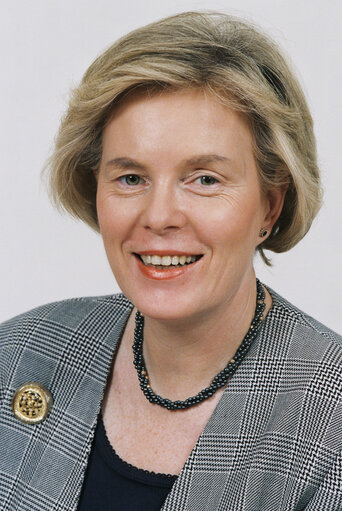
Hanja Maij-Weggen, leader of the CDA delegation in the European Parliament from 1994 until 2003.

Election	Lead candidate	List	Votes	%	Seats	+/–	EP Group	Ref.
1979	Bouke Beumer	List	2,017,743	35.6	10 / 25	New	EPP	
1984	Bouke Beumer	List	1,590,218	30.0	8 / 25	▼2	EPP	
1989	Jean Penders	List	1,813,035	34.6	10 / 25	▲2	EPP	
1994	Hanja Maij-Weggen	List	1,271,840	30.8	10 / 31	0	EPP	
1999	Hanja Maij-Weggen	List	951,898	26.9	9 / 31	▼1	EPP–ED	
2004	Camiel Eurlings	List	1,164,431	24.4	7 / 27	▼2	EPP–ED	
2009	Wim van de Camp	List	913,233	20.1	5 / 25	▼2	EPP	
2009	Wim van de Camp	List	913,233	20.1	5 / 26	0	EPP	
2014	Esther de Lange	List	721,766	15.2	5 / 26	0	EPP	
2019	Esther de Lange	List	669,555	12.2	4 / 26	▼1	EPP	
2019	Esther de Lange	List	669,555	12.2	5 / 29	▲1	EPP	
2024	Tom Berendsen	List	589,205	9.5	3 / 31	▼2	EPP	

== Electorate ==
The core electorate of the CDA are church members, both Catholics and Protestants. Part of the electoral decline can be attributed to secularisation (9–10 seats in the period 1970–2010), while church members increasingly have been voting for other (mostly non-religious) parties (10-14 seats in the period 1970-2010). Non church members at times also vote for CDA, with a record during the 2002 general election. The CDA has been stated to be an issue owner of "norms and values".

=== 2021–2023 ===
Voter surveys held after the March 2021 general election and the March 2023 provincial elections showed that the average CDA voter's self-placement on a left-right axis was slightly to the right of the average voter. They were slightly less supportive of euthanasia and climate policy. CDA voters were more opposed to immigration than the average voter in 2021, but this difference had disappeared by 2023. 2023 CDA voters also had more trust in political parties than the average voter. The average CDA voter was older than the average voter, at 63 in 2021 (compared to 55 among all voters) and 61 in 2023 (compared to 56 among all voters). Around 60% of CDA voters described themselves as religious, a proportion twice as high as the proportion among all voters. Around 60 to 70% of CDA voters lived in rural areas, compared to roughly half of all voters. CDA voters felt considerably more connected to other people than voters of other parties and, in 2023, were slightly happier about their life.

== Organisation ==
=== Linked organisations ===
==== CDA Research Institute ====
The think tanks of CDA's predecessors, Dr. Abraham Kuyperstichting (ARP), Centrum voor Staatkundige Vorming (KVP) and the Jhr.mr. A.F. de Savornin Lohmanstichting (CHU), started working together in 1972 and played a role in the Contact Council. On 15 December 1977, the Stichting Studiecentrum CDA was founded as a collaborative body for the three think tanks. The think tanks merged into the Stichting Studiecentrum CDA in 1980, when the parties merged, and in 1981 the name was changed to CDA Research Institute (Dutch: Wetenschappelijk Instituut voor het CDA).

==== Christian Democratic Youth Appeal ====
The youth wing of the CDA is the Christian Democratic Youth Appeal (CDJA). It was founded as a federation of the youth wings of its predecessors in 1977 and they merged in 1981. The CDJA has a seat in the Association Council of the CDA and is often active with motions and amendments in party conventions.

=== International organisations ===
==== European People's Party ====
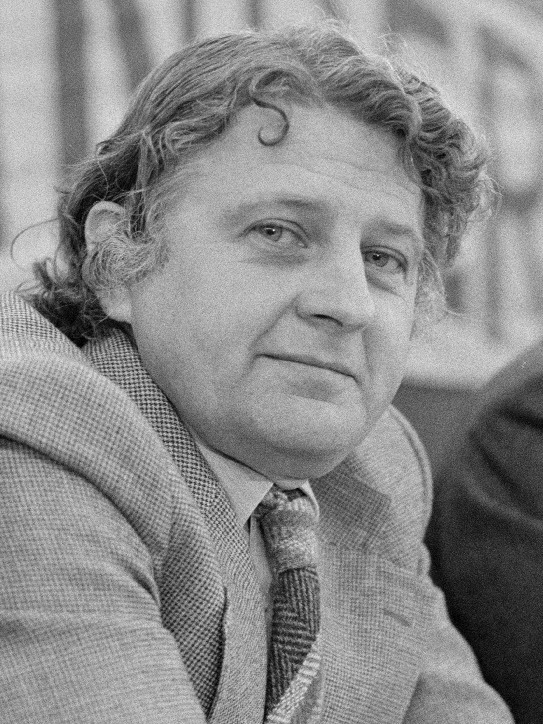
Former CDA party chair Piet Bukman was president of the European People's Party between 1985 and 1987.

The CDA is a founding member of the European People's Party (EPP) and its parliamentary group in the European Parliament in 1976. For the establishment, CDA focused on the Christian democratic character it believed the party should have. This was explicit in its programme, but CDA believed it should also be visible in the name and membership of the party. In contrast, the more secular and antisocialist Christian Democratic Union of Germany (CDU) wanted to include conservative parties, to become the largest group and form a front against socialism. As a compromise, the term "Christian democratic" would be included in the subtitle and non-Christian democratic parties would not be allowed to join.

CDA would for a long time oppose the membership of the Conservative Party (UK), Forza Italia and the return of the Austrian People's Party. In 2019, called for the expulsion of the Hungarian Fidesz party, because of the rule of law and press freedom under its rule, which finally led Fidesz to leave in 2021. In the past, the Dutch parties 50PLUS and Christian Union were part of the EPP parliamentary group, but not of the party. The Dutch parties New Social Contract (NSC) and the Farmer–Citizen Movement (BBB) are since 2024 also member of the parliamentary group.

== See also ==
- Leader of the Christian Democratic Appeal
- List of party chairs of the Christian Democratic Appeal
- Religion in politics
