= Wopke Hoekstra =

Dutch politician (born 1975)

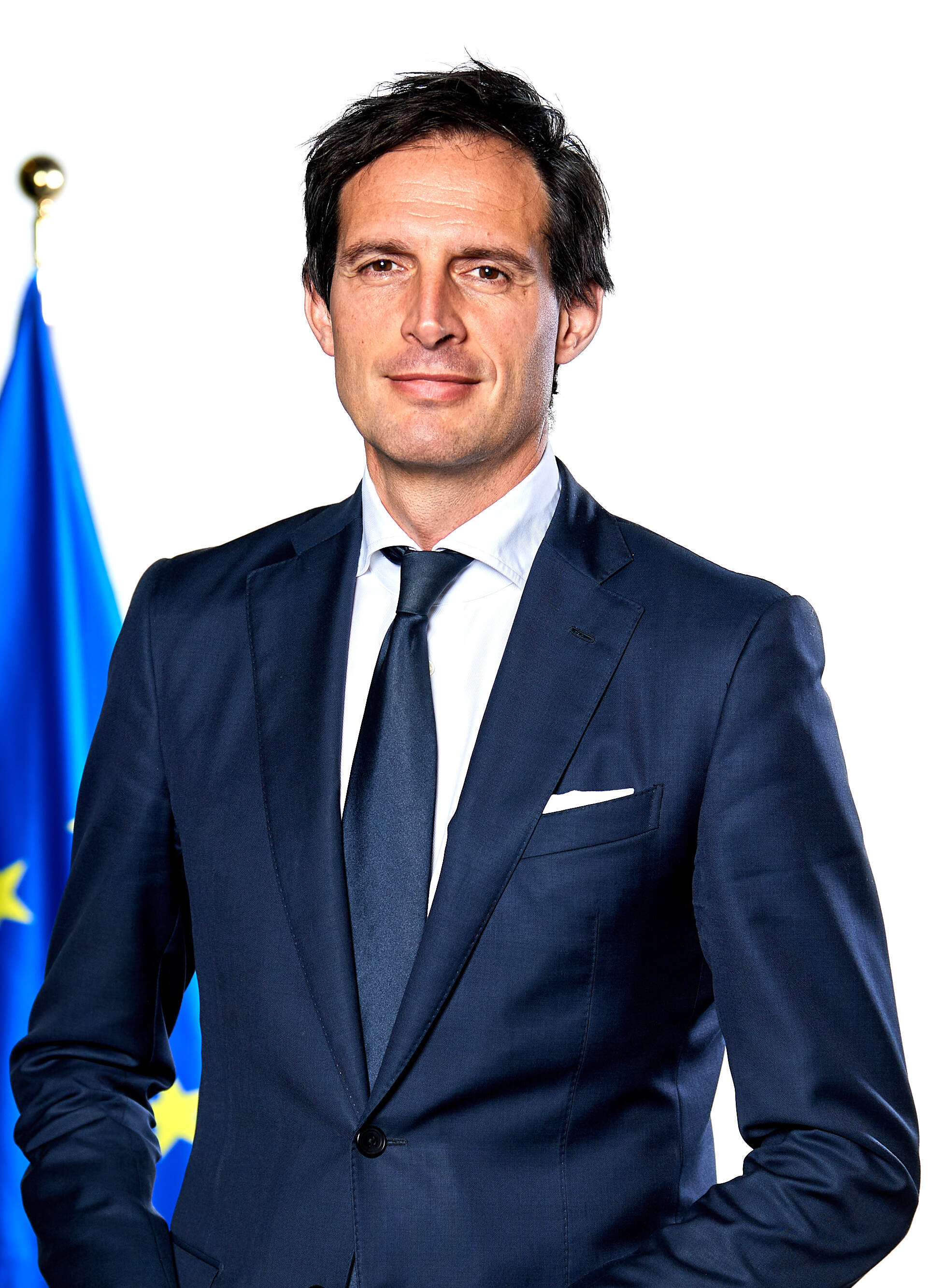
- Official portrait, 2024

European Commissioner for Climate, Net Zero and Clean Growth
- Incumbent
- Assumed office 1 December 2024
- Commission: Von der Leyen II
- Preceded by: Himself

European Commissioner for Climate Action
- In office 9 October 2023 – 1 December 2024
- Commission: Von der Leyen I
- Preceded by: Maroš Šefčovič (acting)
- Succeeded by: Himself

Second Deputy Prime Minister of the Netherlands
- In office 10 January 2022 – 1 September 2023
- Prime Minister: Mark Rutte
- Preceded by: Kajsa Ollongren
- Succeeded by: Karien van Gennip

Minister of Foreign Affairs
- In office 10 January 2022 – 1 September 2023
- Prime Minister: Mark Rutte
- Preceded by: Ben Knapen
- Succeeded by: Liesje Schreinemacher (acting)

Leader of the Christian Democratic Appeal
- In office 11 December 2020 – 14 August 2023
- Preceded by: Hugo de Jonge
- Succeeded by: Henri Bontenbal

Minister of Finance
- In office 26 October 2017 – 10 January 2022
- Prime Minister: Mark Rutte
- Preceded by: Jeroen Dijsselbloem
- Succeeded by: Sigrid Kaag

Member of the House of Representatives
- In office 31 March 2021 – 10 January 2022

Member of the Senate
- In office 7 June 2011 – 26 October 2017

Personal details
- Born: Wopke Bastiaan Hoekstra; 30 September 1975 (age 50) Bennekom, Netherlands
- Party: Christian Democratic Appeal
- Domestic partner: Liselot Hoornweg
- Children: 4
- Education: Leiden University (LLB, LLM); INSEAD (MBA)
- Website: Government website

Wopke Bastiaan Hoekstra (Dutch: [ˈʋɔpkə ˈbɑstijaːn ˈɦukstraː]; born 30 September 1975) is a Dutch politician of the Christian Democratic Appeal (CDA) who serves as European Commissioner for Climate, Net Zero and Clean Growth in the second von der Leyen commission.

Following a corporate career and a decade in the Dutch Senate and House of Representatives, Hoekstra served as Minister of Finance in the third Rutte cabinet from 2017 to 2022 and Leader of the Christian Democratic Appeal (CDA) from 2020 to 2023. In January 2022, he became second Deputy Prime Minister of the Netherlands and Minister of Foreign Affairs in the fourth Rutte cabinet. Hoekstra left the cabinet in September 2023 to succeed Frans Timmermans as European Commissioner for Climate Action in the first von der Leyen commission, and he stayed in his role when the second von der Leyen Commission was inaugurated in December 2024.

== Early life ==
Hoekstra was born in Bennekom, Gelderland. He studied law at Leiden University from 1994 and obtained his LLM degree in 2001. He also studied history at this university for one year, in which he received a propaedeutic diploma in 1997. During his student years in Leiden he was president of the fraternity Minerva. Hoekstra took elective courses in law and economics at LUISS in Rome in 2000, before he obtained an MBA degree at INSEAD in Fontainebleau, France and Singapore in 2005.

Before he joined the government, Hoekstra was a partner with the consultancy firm McKinsey. Hoekstra was also chairman of the supervisory board of the National Maritime Museum in Amsterdam and ambassador for the Prinses Maxima Centrum for pediatric oncology. Until 2006, he worked for Shell in Berlin, Hamburg and Rotterdam.

== Political career ==
=== Early beginnings ===
Hoekstra was the treasurer of the CDA-affiliated foundation Eduardo Freistichting and board member of the local CDA association in Amsterdam.

In December 2010, it was announced that Hoekstra was a candidate for the Senate election of 2011, for which he was indeed elected, and sworn in on 7 June 2011 as its youngest member. Membership of the Senate is a part-time position, and therefore Hoekstra continued as consultant with McKinsey. On 6 December of the same year, he gave his maiden speech during the debate on a tax-related topic. In the Senate, he stood out as the party's spokesperson for pensions. He was not reluctant to deviate from the party line on a number of ethical issues: he was the only CDA senator to vote in favour of a ban on civil servants refusing to marry same-sex couples (weigerambtenaar) and to vote in favour of legal status for lesbian parents (meemoederschap). He was reelected in 2015. Ahead of the 2017 general election, Hoekstra helped write the CDA's manifesto.

Hoekstra was nominated by the parliamentary press in 2013 as 'political talent of the year' and in 2016 he was the second-youngest person in the De Volkskrant top-200 of influential Dutch people. In 2016, he was one of the lead architects of the party platform.

=== Minister of Finance, 2017–2022 ===
Hoekstra was appointed Minister of Finance in the third Rutte cabinet on 26 October 2017, succeeding Jeroen Dijsselbloem.

At his first meeting with other EU Ministers of Finance in Brussels in 2017, Hoekstra expressed scepticism about eurozone reform, saying that budgetary discipline in other eurozone states was necessary first. Hoekstra reiterated his reluctance on eurozone reform at a meeting of the financial council of the Christian Democratic Union of Germany in 2018, warning against reforms initiated by Germany and France without the support of other member states or the public. Furthermore, at a visit to his German counterpart Olaf Scholz in March 2018, Hoekstra explained that he is reluctant about plans for an eurozone budget, an eurozone finance minister and a common deposit insurance scheme. After Germany and France had outlined a series of eurozone reforms in June 2018, Hoekstra led a coalition of twelve other member states in opposition to such reforms, which would later be referred to as the New Hanseatic League. In January 2019, Hoekstra criticised the European Commission for its decision not to launch a disciplinary procedure against Italy over its deficit and debt, stating "It's a missed opportunity to do the right thing for the long run", a concern later repeated by Prime Minister Mark Rutte at the World Economic Forum.

During his time in office, Hoekstra oversaw the government's purchase of a stake in Air France KLM equal to that of the French government to increase its influence in the carrier's business operations in 2019. That same year, led negotiations with the German government on the possibility of buying a stake in grid operator TenneT.

Since 2018, Hoekstra has been chairing a newly established, informal grouping of small northern and Baltic EU member states – Estonia, Finland, Ireland, Latvia, Lithuania and the Netherlands – to find common cause on the direction of eurozone reforms. Hoekstra has also expressed his opposition to an increase in the Netherlands' contribution to the EU budget as a result of Brexit. In 2019, Hoekstra joined forces with his counterparts of Germany, France, Italy, Spain and Latvia in pushing for the establishment of new EU supervisory authority that would take over from states the oversight of money laundering at financial firms.

In March 2020, after a tense meeting with fellow EU national leaders where Hoekstra called for an investigation into southern European countries' proclaimed lack of budgetary capacity to cope with the COVID-19 pandemic, Portuguese Prime Minister António Costa referred to his comments as "repugnant", saying that "this recurrent pettiness completely undermines what the spirit of the European Union is."

On 31 October 2020, Hoekstra stated that the Dutch government would not provide further financial assistance to KLM as long as it did not agree with financial sacrifices by all employees for a period of five years. In discussions with KLM, the Dutch Airline Pilots Association (Dutch: Vereniging van Nederlandse Verkeersvliegers) and the Federation of Dutch Trade Unions refused to comply with the five-year period Hoekstra requested. Several days later the parties agreed with the terms and the Dutch cabinet approved the deal with KLM on 4 November.

On 11 December 2020, a day after Hugo de Jonge announced his resignation as Leader of the Christian Democratic Appeal, the party's board unanimously nominated Hoekstra to succeed him.

On 15 January 2021, Hoekstra stepped down along with the Dutch government, after thousands of families were wrongly accused of child welfare fraud. In April 2021, he joined forces with Sigrid Kaag in putting forward a motion of censure to voice their disapproval of Prime Minister Rutte.

On 2009, leaked documents show that Hoekstra obtained shares in an offshore company, Candace Management Ltd., based in the British Virgin Islands. He acquired more shares in 2013 and 2014, while he was a senator.

On 5 October 2021, Paul Tang, a Dutch centre-left MEP who chairs the European Parliament's tax committee, argued that Hoekstra should symbolically stay out of the EU tax-haven decision. "Hoekstra, who had investments in the British Virgin Islands (BVI), should excuse himself from this decision," Tang added.

=== Minister of Foreign Affairs, 2022–2023 ===
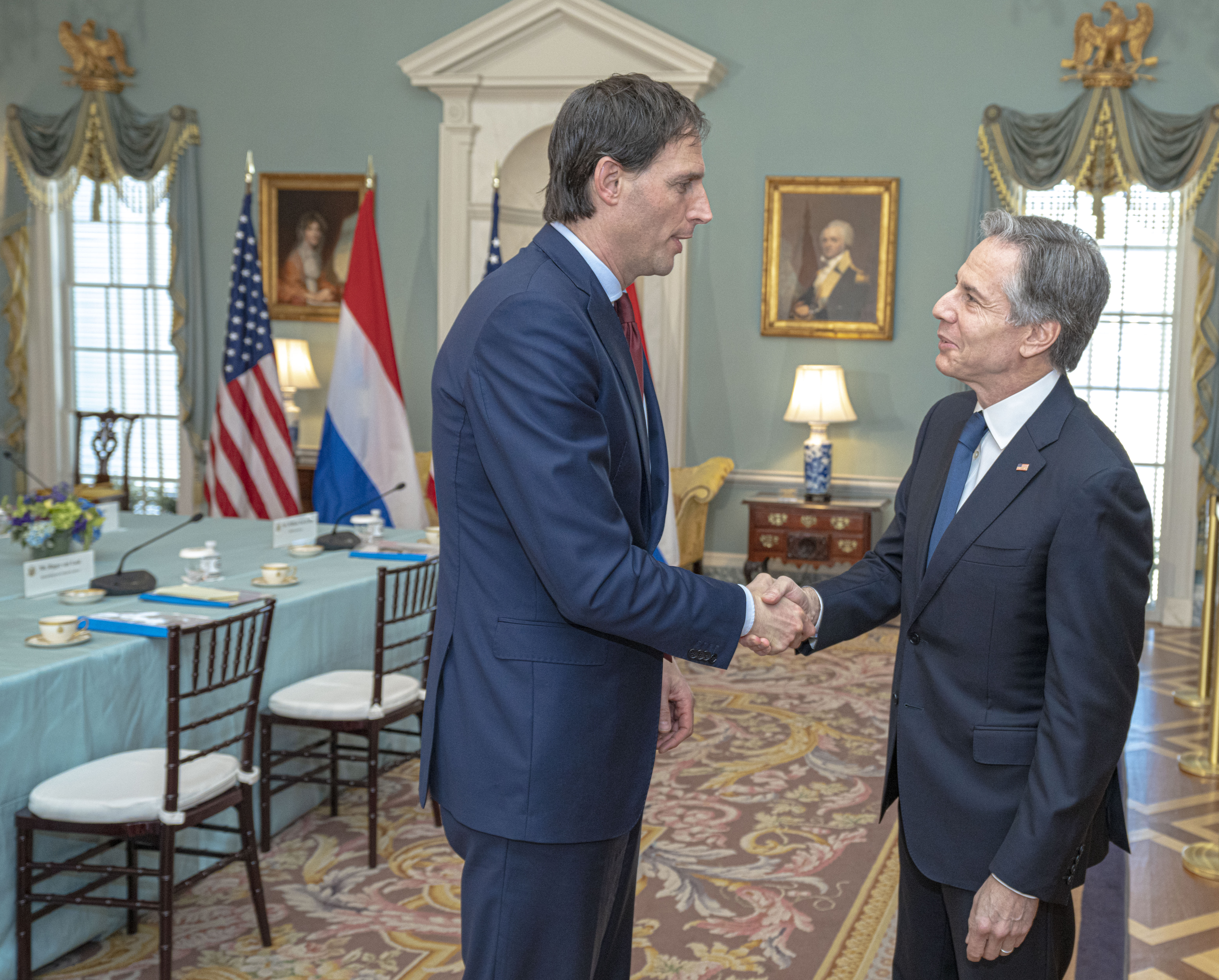
Hoekstra with U.S. Secretary of State Antony Blinken in April 2022

On 10 January 2022, Hoekstra was appointed Minister of Foreign Affairs and Deputy Prime Minister in the fourth Rutte cabinet.

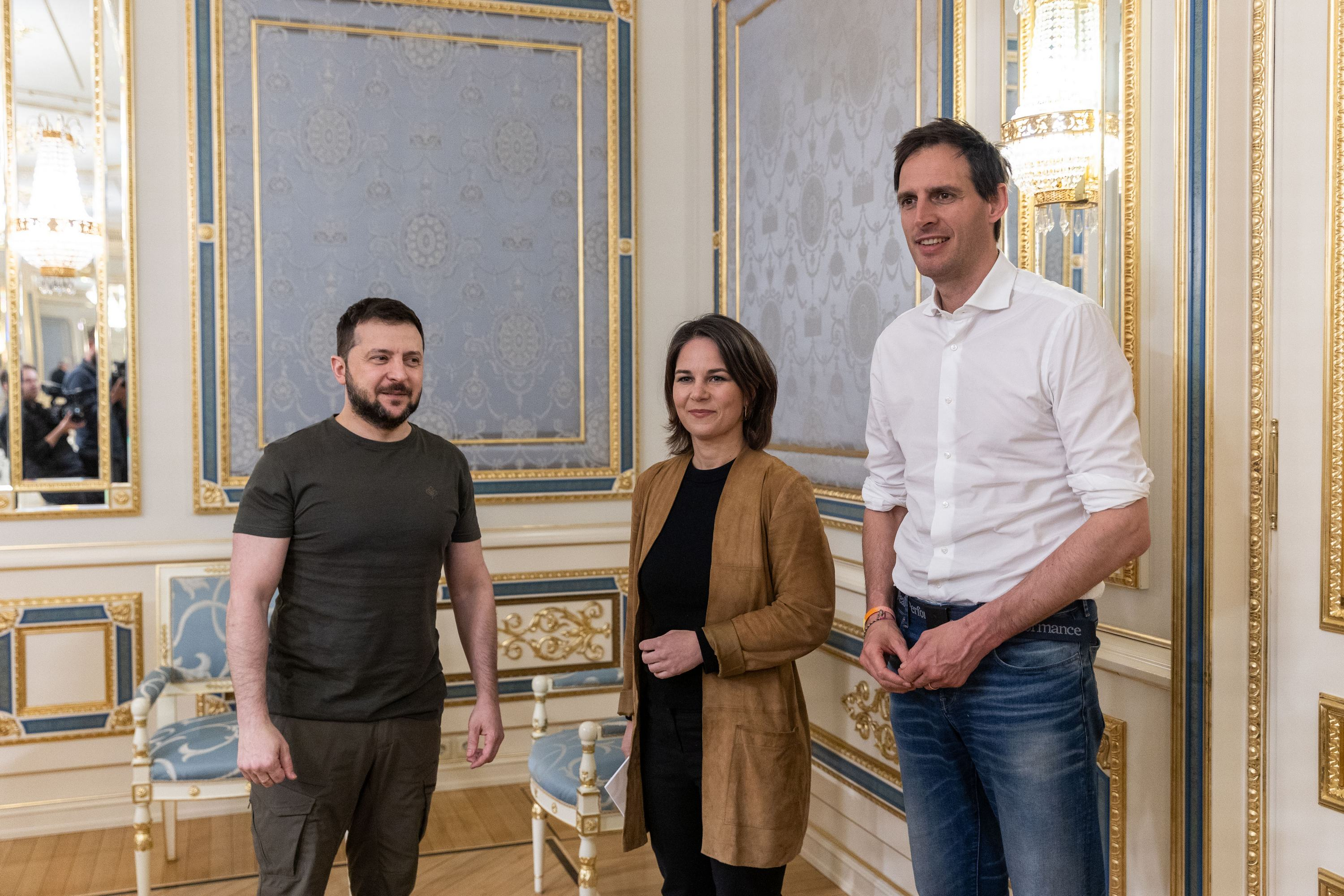
Hoekstra with Ukrainian President Volodymyr Zelenskyy and German Foreign Minister Annalena Baerbock in May 2022

The cabinet fell on 7 July 2023 and directly after this Hoekstra announced that he would not lead the CDA party into the 2023 Dutch general election.

=== European Commission ===
In August 2023, it became known that Hoekstra would receive the Dutch nomination as climate commissioner for the EU to succeed Frans Timmermans, who had withdrawn from the position to become the leader of the joint GroenLinks–PvdA alliance. Although the European environmental committee was not immediately convinced by Hoekstra's plans, it quickly approved of Hoekstra as a candidate. On 5 October 2023, Hoekstra was finally voted into office by a simple majority in the European Parliament. He was the EU's main negotiator at a United Nations Climate Change Conference (COP) in Dubai the following month, at which participating countries agreed to shift away from using fossil fuels. According to newspaper NRC, Hoekstra was "relatively invisible" during his tenure, as most of the term's climate legislation had already been finalized. Hoekstra later complained that Chinese state-sponsored manufacturers were flooding the European market for renewable energy products such as solar panels, electric vehicles, and electrolysers, and he said that action had to be taken.

Following the June 2024 European Parliament election, the Schoof cabinet nominated Hoekstra on 22 July to serve as the next Dutch EU commissioner. On 1 December 2024, he was sworn in as Commissioner for Climate, Net Zero and Clean Growth as part of the second von der Leyen commission.

According to a study by scientists from Utrecht University published in August 2025, the Atlantic meridional overturning circulation (AMOC) could start to collapse as early as the 2060s. The collapse of the AMOC would be a severe climate catastrophe, resulting in a cooling of the Northern Hemisphere. Hoekstra described the findings as a "wake-up call".

In September 2025, Hoekstra described China's new climate pledge as "clearly disappointing, and given China's immense footprint, it makes reaching the world's climate goals significantly more challenging."

== Other activities ==
=== European Union organisations ===
- European Investment Bank (EIB), Ex-Officio Member of the Board of Governors (2017–2021)
- European Stability Mechanism (ESM), Member of the Board of Governors (2017–2021)

=== International organisations ===
- Asian Infrastructure Investment Bank (AIIB), Ex-Officio Member of the Board of Governors (2017–2021)
- European Bank for Reconstruction and Development (EBRD), Ex-Officio Member of the Board of Governors (2017–2021)
- Joint World Bank-IMF Development Committee, Member
- Multilateral Investment Guarantee Agency (MIGA), World Bank Group, Ex-Officio Member of the Board of Governors (2017–2021)
- World Bank, Ex-Officio Member of the Board of Governors (2017–2021)

=== Non-profit organisations ===
- Nederlands Scheepvaartmuseum, Member of the Supervisory Board
- Friends of the Hubrecht Institute for Developmental Biology and Stem Cell Research, Member of the Board
- Princess Máxima Center for Pediatric Oncology, Ambassador

== Honours ==
- Belgium: Grand Cross of the Order of the Crown (2023)
- Italy: Grand Officer of the Order of Merit of the Italian Republic (2022)
- Sweden: Commander Grand Cross of the Royal Order of the Polar Star (2022)
- Ukraine: Order of Prince Yaroslav the Wise of the III degree (2022)
- France

== Personal life ==
Hoekstra lives with his wife, a general practitioner, and four children. He is a member of the Remonstrant Brotherhood.

== Electoral history ==
Electoral history of Wopke Hoekstra
Year	Body	Party	Pos.	Votes	Result		Ref.
Year	Body	Party	Pos.	Votes	Party seats	Individual	Ref.
2021	House of Representatives	Christian Democratic Appeal	1	437,240	15	Won	

Political offices
Preceded by Jeroen Dijsselbloem	Minister of Finance; 2017–2022	Succeeded by Sigrid Kaag
Preceded by Ben Knapen	Minister of Foreign Affairs; 2022–2023	Succeeded by Liesje Schreinemacher; Acting
Preceded by Maroš Šefčovič	European Commissioner for Climate Action; 2023–2024	Succeeded by Himself
Preceded by Himself	European Commissioner for Climate, Net Zero and Clean Growth; 2024–present	Incumbent
Party political offices
Preceded by Hugo de Jonge	Leader of the Christian Democratic Appeal; 2020-2023	Succeeded by Henri Bontenbal
