= List of candidates in the 2004 European Parliament election in the Netherlands =

The 2004 European Parliament election for the election of the delegation from the Netherlands was held on 10 June 2004. This is the 6th time the elections have been held for the European elections in the Netherlands.

== Numbering of the candidates list ==
The official order and names of candidate lists:

Candidate lists for the European Parliament election in the Netherlands
2004
Lists
List		English translation	List name (Dutch)
1	list	CDA - European People's Party	CDA – Europese Volkspartij
2	list	P.v.d.A./European Social Democrats	P.v.d.A./Europese Sociaaldemocraten
3	list	VVD - European Liberal-Democrats	VVD – Europese Liberaal-Democraten
4	list	GREENLEFT	GROENLINKS
5	list	Christian Union-SGP	ChristenUnie–SGP
6	list	Democrats 66 (D66)	Democraten 66 (D66)
7	list	SP (Socialist Party)	SP (Socialistische Partij)
8	list	Democratic Europe	Democratisch Europa
9	list	LIVABLE EUROPE	LEEFBAAR EUROPA
10	list	Party for the North	Partij voor het Noorden
11	list	New Right	Nieuw Rechts
12	list	Europe Transparent	Europa Transparant
13	list	List Pim Fortuyn (LPF)	Lijst Pim Fortuyn (LPF)
14	list	Party for the Animals	Partij voor de Dieren
15	list	Respect.now	Respect.Nu

== CDA - European People's Party ==
Candidate list for the Christian Democratic Appeal
Number	Candidate	Votes	Result
1	Camiel Eurlings	938,025	Elected
2	Maria Martens	50,493	Elected
3	Albert Jan Maat	30,948	Elected
4	Corien Wortmann-Kool	9,776	Elected
5	Bert Doorn	4,842	Elected
6	Lambert van Nistelrooij	27,957	Elected
7	Joop Post	7,515	Replacement
8	Ria Oomen-Ruijten	29,719	Elected
9	Bartho Pronk	4,044	
10	Esther de Lange	2,754	Replacement
11	Osman Elmaci	13,759	
12	Cornelis Visser	3,832	Replacement
13	Bert de Wilde	11,822	
14	Hanneke Boerma	1,969	
15	Rutger Jan Hebben	1,039	
16	Frans Veringa	1,395	
17	Eiko Smid	1,130	
18	Jan van Laarhoven	561	
19	Merlijn Winkelman	738	
20	Roy Ho Ten Soeng	6,131	
21	Hillie van de Streek	640	
22	Gerrit Goedhart	962	
23	Jan Smeele	202	
24	Wim Eilering	4,413	
25	Peter Boon	605	
26	Fokke Hoekstra	1,701	
27	Lenny Geluk-Poortvliet	807	
28	Lionel Martijn	1,302	
29	Henk Klaver	2,197	
30	Daniëlle van Lith-Woestenberg	3,153	
Total		1,164,431	

== P.v.d.A./European Social Democrats ==
Candidate list for the Labour Party
Number	Candidate	Votes	Result
1	Max van den Berg	879,972	Elected
2	Jan Marinus Wiersma	27,067	Elected
3	Edith Mastenbroek	92,018	Elected
4	Dorette Corbey	17,847	Elected
5	Thijs Berman	6,825	Elected
6	Ieke van den Burg	7,695	Elected
7	Lily Jacobs	10,983	Replacement
8	Emine Bozkurt	24,359	Elected
9	Jan Cremers	3,787	Replacement
10	Gerrit Valk	10,144	
11	Jenny Ytsma	4,629	
12	Lo Breemer	1,458	
13	Erik van Merrienboer	2,386	
14	Anita Andriessen	5,995	
15	Paul Depla	3,282	
16	Veronica Dirksen	9,906	
17	Jan Hamming	4,728	
18	Rein Welschen	11,468	
Total		1,124,549	

== VVD - European Liberal-Democrats ==
Candidate list for the People's Party for Freedom and Democracy (VVD)
Number	Candidate	Votes	Result
1	Jules Maaten	412,688	Elected
2	Jan Mulder	43,376	Elected
3	Toine Manders	32,819	Elected
4	Jeanine Hennis-Plasschaert	44,064	Elected
5	Herman Vermeer	11,100	
6	Marianne Kallen-Morren	9,946	
7	Han ten Broeke	19,067	
8	Aly Wisse-Maat	8,320	
9	Esther Rommel	9,009	
10	Oussama Cherribi	2,607	
11	Maarten van de Donk	3,908	
12	Ted Versteegh-Weijers	6,859	
13	Wytze Russchen	2,986	
14	Enno Scholma	562	
15	Ria von Bönninghausen tot Herinkhave-Visser	2,538	
16	Sander van der Eijk	920	
17	Jeannette Baljeu	1,702	
18	Katja Buchsbaum	1,104	
19	Paul Scheffer	1,713	
20	Meivin Könings	659	
21	Hans Pluckel	634	
22	Age van der Werf	867	
23	Cécile Franssen	2,895	
24	Harry van den Boogaard	508	
25	Arnoud Ongerboer de Visser	873	
26	Lysbeth van Valkenburg-Lely	879	
27	Robert de Oude	873	
28	Hendrik Noorderhaven	521	
29	Eric Neef	1,747	
30	Dennis Straat	3,454	
Total		629,198	

== GreenLeft ==
Candidate list for the GroenLinks
Number	Candidate	Votes	Result
1	Kathalijne Buitenweg	297,237	Elected
2	Joost Lagendijk	12,405	Elected
3	Alexander de Roo	7,474	
4	Ingrid Visseren-Hamakers	9,432	
5	Doğan Gök	7,382	
6	Bas Eickhout	1,389	
7	Jolanda Terpstra	4,324	
8	Marije Cornelissen	1,920	
9	Richard Wouters	967	
10	Karin Verbaken	1,307	
11	Hein Verkerk	694	
12	Stefanie de Niet	3,269	
13	Sabina Voogd	962	
14	Arnoud Boer	551	
15	Hugo van Valkenburg	238	
16	Jaap van den Bergh	348	
17	Titia van Leeuwen	2,302	
Total		352,201	

== Christian Union-SGP ==
Candidate list for the ChristenUnie–SGP
Number	Candidate	Votes	Result
1	Hans Blokland	197,031	Elected
2	Bas Belder	44,473	Elected
3	Peter van Dalen	5,982	
4	Chris Janse	2,674	
5	Rijk van Dam	4,214	
6	Evert-Jan Brouwer	1,295	
7	Hans van Dijk	1,782	
8	Jan Verboom	771	
9	Ruud van Eijle	2,189	
10	Ton de Jong	784	
11	Heleen van den Berg	7,854	
12	Otto van der Tang	623	
13	Nadine de Roode-Hof	1,750	
14	Gerrit Holdijk	739	
15	Jochem Pleijsier	364	
16	Rinus Houtman	779	
17	Leon Meijer	1,660	
18	Henk Jan van Schothorst	553	
19	Johannes Schenk	2,012	
20	Roelof Bisschop	2,351	
Total		279,880	

== Democrats 66 (D66) ==
Candidate list for the D66
Number	Candidate	Votes	Result
1	Sophie in 't Veld	161,104	Elected
2	Johanna Boogerd-Quaak	11,184	
3	Margriet de Jong	7,784	
4	Bob van den Bos	5,526	
5	Suzanne Dekker	6,135	
6	Simone Filippini	2,046	
7	Unico van Kooten	715	
8	Robert van Lente	671	
9	Jasper Diekema	454	
10	Bas van Drooge	909	
11	Bram Houtenbos	1,267	
12	Pierre Wimmers	382	
13	Jörgen van Nistelrooij	2,893	
14	Nanne Roosenschoon	1,432	
Total		202,502	

== SP (Socialist Party) ==
Candidates for the European Parliament from the SP
SP candidates 1989	(1989)
SP candidates 1994	(1994)
SP candidates 1999	(1999)
SP candidates 2004	(2004)
SP candidates 2009	(2009)
SP candidates 2014	(2014)
SP candidates 2019	(2019)
SP candidates 2024	(2024)

Candidate list for the Socialist Party (SP)
Number	Candidate	Votes	Result
1	Erik Meijer	230,531	Elected
2	René Roovers	15,510	
3	Kartika Liotard	32,187	Elected
4	Jasper van Dijk	7,567	
5	Frank Futselaar	3,606	
6	Rosita van Gijlswijk	8,256	
7	Serdar Dosky	3,813	
8	Clara Blaauw	3,821	
9	Bob Ruers	1,423	
10	Chandra Jankie	2,371	
11	Lucien Stöpler	413	
12	Akansel Kaymaz	1,964	
13	Paul Lempens	2,159	
14	Hilde van der Molen	1,604	
15	Niels de Heij	510	
16	Kinge Siljee	548	
17	Theo Cornelissen	986	
18	Ewout Irrgang	309	
19	Driek van Vugt	815	
20	Ingrid Gyömörei-Agelink	868	
21	Anneke de Bres-de Langen	3,191	
22	Jan van Schaik	802	
23	Jacqueline Gabriël	1,863	
24	Peter van Zutphen	2,640	
25	Nuh Demirbilek	361	
26	Trix de Roos-Consemulder	866	
27	Ad Schiedon	200	
28	Henk van den Boomgaard	250	
29	Elke de Vries-Becker	2,892	
Total		332,326	

== Democratic Europe ==
Candidate list for Democratic Europe
Number	Candidate	Votes	Result
1	Sammy van Tuyll van Serooskerken	6,416	
2	Sonja Kleijne	1,031	
3	Egbert Veen	236	
4	Carla Sieburg	206	
5	John Moeleker	90	
6	Wouter van Tongeren	244	
7	Eelco Boomsma	203	
8	Willem Meijer	354	
Total		8,780	

== Livable Europe ==
Candidate list for Livable Europe
Number	Candidate	Votes	Result
1	Jan Leechburch Auwers	6,290	
2	Abraham de Kruijf	702	
3	Alcides Martina	601	
4	Ilham Sabih	350	
5	Sofie van Velzen-Mrugala	269	
6	Liesbeth Peters	447	
7	Sjaak Oostveen	485	
Total		9,144	

== Party for the North ==
Candidate list for the Party for the North
Number	Candidate	Votes	Result
1	Teun Jan Zanen	9,717	
2	Jan van der Baan	2,691	
3	Sanne Terpstra	1,595	
4	Egbert Kruize	468	
5	Robert Schliessler	110	
6	Danny Hoekzema-Buist	158	
7	Harm Schroor	388	
8	Fleur Woudstra	256	
9	Kerst Huisman	504	
10	Geert Staats	163	
11	Nico Zweerts de Jong	313	
12	Jan Venekamp	151	
13	Harmien van der Werff-Poort	152	
14	Dorien Schoffelmeer	69	
15	Loek van der Heide	275	
16	Leendert van der Laan	97	
17	Sabrina Jessen	81	
18	Hilbert Koetsier	39	
19	Ruud de Goede	92	
20	Luit Gazendam	49	
21	Marieke Stokkers	40	
22	Ineke Rusch	21	
23	Minne Everhardus	84	
24	Aleid Brouwer	60	
25	Henk Hoiting	63	
26	Joop Borgman	63	
27	Reinder Hoekzema	51	
28	Tjeerd Oliemans	29	
29	Lieuwe Terpstra	95	
30	Jan Uitham	360	
Total		18,234	

== New Right ==
Candidate list for New Right
Number	Candidate	Votes	Result
1	Michiel Smit	12,911	
2	Antonia Viljac	389	
3	Koen Berghuis	350	
4	Wim Elsthout	254	
5	Inge Bleecke	175	
6	Rene van Gool	135	
7	Jan Jitse Visser	155	
8	Betty Groothuizen-Trip	100	
9	Marcel Bijsterveld	92	
10	Peter Reedijk	103	
11	Roald van der Tempel	90	
12	Wouter Troost	102	
13	Jannie de Gelder	56	
14	Simon Schiffeleers	70	
15	Rob Copier	44	
16	Marc Wintermans	84	
17	Frans Paalvast	82	
18	Gabor Heeres	115	
19	Anouschka van Corler	53	
20	Cor Engelen	45	
21	Ruud Buth	31	
22	Leonie de Raad	41	
23	Kenneth Tharmaratnam	43	
24	Ade Jansen	70	
25	Marc Bajema	142	
Total		15,732	

== Europe Transparent ==
Candidate list for Europe Transparent
Number	Candidate	Votes	Result
1	Paul van Buitenen	338,477	Elected
2	Els de Groen	4,796	Elected
3	Ries Baeten	480	
4	Gert de Wit	274	
5	Adrie Kok	280	
6	Anton van Putten	287	
7	Alexander Brom	319	
8	Mehmet Sagsu	293	
9	Jeroen Nieuwesteeg	118	
10	Frank van Zon	237	
11	Anne-Karien Braamhaar	643	
12	Alfons Nieuwland	334	
13	Louis van der Kallen	524	
14	Nico Kuijt	349	
15	Henk Laarman	146	
16	Bob van der Meer	130	
17	Henk van Persie	96	
18	Paul Schaap	680	
19	Ton Bazelmans	218	
20	Cees Schaap	475	
Total		349,156	

== List Pim Fortuyn (LPF) ==
Candidate list for the List Pim Fortuyn
Number	Candidate	Votes	Result
1	Jens van der Vorm-de Rijke	93,169	
2	Sven Spaargaren	8,203	
3	Harry Smulders	7,903	
4	Frits Palm	2,753	
5	Leo Gerritse	4,206	
6	Wim Boogaart	1,440	
7	Henk Daalhuizen	3,835	
Total		121,509	

== Party for the Animals ==
Candidate list for the Party for the Animals
Number	Candidate	Votes	Result
1	Marianne Thieme	113,752	
2	Bernd Timmerman	2,969	
3	Marjolein de Rooij	2,645	
4	Claudi Hulshof	902	
5	Jasmijn de Boo	1,638	
6	Ruth van der Leij	622	
7	Wietse Haak	1,093	
8	Rita Stockmann-van Leeuwen	650	
9	Ton Dekker	663	
10	Marleen Drijgers	638	
11	Henk Keilman	260	
12	Dirk Boon	692	
13	Paul Cliteur	2,966	
14	Gerti Bierenbroodspot	1,685	
15	Mensje van Keulen	1,878	
16	Belinda Meuldijk	7,587	
17	Martin Gaus	5,046	
18	Jan Wolkers	5,547	
19	Rudy Kousbroek	2,199	
Total		153,432	

== Respect.now ==
Candidate list for Respect.now
Number	Candidate	Votes	Result
1	Ton Wurtz	3,363	
2	Dick Engel	1,240	
Total		4,603	

== Sources ==
- Election candidates for the European Elections in the Staatscourant
- Minutes from the Election Committee
