= List of members of the European Parliament for the Netherlands, 2004–2009 =

This is a list of members of the European Parliament for the Netherlands in the 2004 to 2009 session, ordered by name and by party.

== Party representation ==
National party	EP Group	Seats	±
Christian Democratic Appeal	EPP-ED	7 / 27	2 ▼
Labour Party	PES	7 / 27	1 ▲
People's Party for Freedom and Democracy	ALDE	4 / 27	2 ▼
GreenLeft	G–EFA	2 / 27	2 ▼
Europe Transparent	G–EFA	2 / 27	2 ▲
Socialist Party	EUL–NGL	2 / 27	1 ▲
ChristianUnion–Reformed Political Party	IND&DEM	2 / 27	1 ▼
Democrats 66	ALDE	1 / 27	1 ▼

== Alphabetical ==
MEPs for the Netherlands elected to the 6th European Parliament session
2004–2009
Name	Sex	National party	EP Group	Period	Preference vote
Bas Belder	Male	Reformed Political Party	IND&DEM	20 July 1999 – 2 July 2019	44,473
Max van den Berg	Male	Labour Party	PES	20 July 1999 – 1 September 2007	879,972
Thijs Berman	Male	Labour Party	PES	20 July 2004 – 1 July 2014	6,825
Hans Blokland	Male	Christian Union	IND&DEM	19 July 1994 – 14 July 2009	197,031
Emine Bozkurt	Female	Labour Party	PES	20 July 2004 – 1 July 2014	24,359
Paul van Buitenen	Male	Europe Transparent	G–EFA	20 July 2004 – 14 July 2009	338,477
Kathalijne Buitenweg	Female	GreenLeft	G–EFA	20 July 1999 – 14 July 2009	297,237
Ieke van den Burg	Female	Labour Party	PES	20 July 1999 – 14 July 2009	7,695
Jan Cremers	Male	Labour Party	PES	8 May 2008 – 14 July 2009	3,787
Dorette Corbey	Female	Labour Party	PES	20 July 1999 – 14 July 2009	17,847
Bert Doorn	Male	Christian Democratic Appeal	EPP–ED	20 July 1999 – 14 July 2009	4,842
Camiel Eurlings	Male	Christian Democratic Appeal	EPP–ED	20 July 2004 – 22 February 2007	938,025
Els de Groen-Kouwenhoven	Female	Europe Transparent	G–EFA	20 July 2004 – 14 July 2009	4,796
Jeanine Hennis-Plasschaert	Female	People's Party for Freedom and Democracy	ALDE	20 July 2004 – 17 June 2010	44,064
Lily Jacobs	Female	Labour Party	PES	4 September 2007 – 14 July 2009	10,983
Joost Lagendijk	Male	GreenLeft	G–EFA	1 September 1998 – 14 July 2009	12,405
Esther de Lange	Female	Christian Democratic Appeal	EPP–ED	12 April 2007 – Present	2,754
Kartika Liotard	Female	Socialist Party	EUL–NGL	20 July 2004 – 1 July 2014	32,187
Albert Jan Maat	Male	Christian Democratic Appeal	EPP–ED	20 July 1999 – 10 April 2007	30,948
Jules Maaten	Male	People's Party for Freedom and Democracy	ALDE	20 July 1999 – 14 July 2009; 2 July 2019 – 2 July 2019	412,688
Toine Manders	Male	People's Party for Freedom and Democracy	ALDE	20 July 1999 – 1 July 2014	32,819
Maria Martens	Female	Christian Democratic Appeal	EPP–ED	20 July 1999 – 14 July 2009	50,493
Edith Mastenbroek	Female	Labour Party	PES	20 July 2004 – 20 April 2008	92,018
Erik Meijer	Male	Socialist Party	EUL–NGL	20 July 1999 – 14 July 2009	230,531
Jan Mulder	Male	People's Party for Freedom and Democracy	ALDE	19 July 1994 – 14 July 2009; 22 June 2010 – 1 July 2014	43,376
Lambert van Nistelrooij	Male	Christian Democratic Appeal	EPP–ED	20 July 2004 – Present	27,957
Ria Oomen-Ruijten	Female	Christian Democratic Appeal	EPP–ED	19 July 1994 – 1 July 2014	29,719
Joop Post	Male	Christian Democratic Appeal	EPP–ED	1 March 2007 – 16 October 2007	7,515
Sophie in 't Veld	Female	Democrats 66	ALDE	20 July 2004 – Present	161,104
Cornelis Visser	Male	Christian Democratic Appeal	EPP–ED	17 October 2007 – 14 July 2009	3,832
Jan-Marinus Wiersma	Male	Labour Party	PES	19 July 1994 – 14 July 2009	27,067
Corien Wortmann-Kool	Female	Christian Democratic Appeal	EPP–ED	20 July 2004 – 1 July 2014	9,776
