= List of Europe Transparent members of the European Parliament =

This is a list of all (former) members of the European Parliament for the Europe Transparent (ET)

== Seats in the European Parliament ==
Election year	List	# of overall votes	% of overall vote	# of overall seats won	+/–	Notes
2004	List	349,156	7.33 (#5)	2 / 27	new	

== Alphabetical ==
=== Elected members of the European Parliament (from 1979) ===
European Parliament member	Sex	Period	Photo
Paul van Buitenen	Male	from 20 July 2004 till 14 July 2009	
Els de Groen-Kouwenhoven	Female	from 20 July 2004 till April 2005	

== European Parliament periods ==
=== 2004-2009 ===
2 seats:

1. Paul van Buitenen
2. Els de Groen-Kouwenhoven
