= List of candidates in the 1989 European Parliament election in the Netherlands =

The 1989 European Parliament election for the election of the delegation from the Netherlands was held on 15 June 1989. This is the 3rd time the elections had been held for the European elections in the Netherlands.

== Background ==
The official order and names of candidate lists:

Candidate lists for the 1989 European Parliament election in the Netherlands
List		English translation	List name (Dutch)
1	list	Labour Party/European Socialists	Partij van de Arbeid/Europese Socialisten
2	list	CDA European People's Party	CDA Europese Volkspartij
3	list	VVD - European Liberal-Democrats	VVD - Europese Liberaal-Democraten
4	list	Rainbow (ppr-psp-cpn-evp-gpn-indep.)	Regenboog (ppr-psp-cpn-evp-gpn-onafh.)
5	list	SGP, GPV and RPF	SGP, GPV en RPF
6	list	D66	
7	list	Socialist Party	Socialistiese Partij
8	list	God with Us	God met Ons
9	list	Initiative for European Democracy IDE	Initiatief voor Europese Democratie IDE
10	list	List Janmaat / Centre Democrats	Lijst Janmaat / Centrumdemocraten

== Labour Party/European Socialists ==
Below is the candidate list for the Labour Party for the 1989 European Parliament election

Elected members are in bold

Number	Candidate	Sex	Preference vote	Photo
1	**Piet Dankert**	Male	1,251,395	thumbs
2	**Hedy d'Ancona**	Female	209,562	thumbs
3	**Eisso Woltjer**	Male	15,203	thumbs
4	**Hemmo Muntingh**	Male	10,317	
5	**Maartje van Putten**	Female	16,548	
6	**Wim van Velzen**	Male	4,921	
7	**Ben Visser**	Male	7,651	
8	**Alman Metten**	Male	2,470	
9	Annemarie Goedmakers		6,086	
10	Mathilde van den Brink		5,436	
11	Arine Brusse		2,224	
12	Marie-José Grotenhuis		4,815	
13	Willemien Ruygrok		6,885	
14	Jan Nico Scholten		6,394	
15	Hans Wolters		2,050	
16	Jan De Boer		2,610	
17	Bert Koenders		1,202	thumbs
18	Siebe Keulen		3,065	
19	Hylke Tromp		7,441	
20	Aad Burger		1,301	
21	Hans Erasmus		1,207	
22	Annie Jongedijk-Welles		1,711	
23	Gerben Poortinga		693	
24	Ans Groenendaal-Kuipers		1,726	
25	Frans Westenbrink		2,200	
26	Arie Kuijper		7,471	
27	Jan Loonen		1,214	
28	Ria Besselink-Eeftink		1,241	
29	Ria Meijvogel		1,001	
30	Mieke Minkes		1,745	
31	Sjef Palmen		5,426	
32	Jip Lenstra		4,190	
33	Jan Berkouwer		569	
34	Pieter Boot		645	
35	Nannette Wezenbeek		611	
36	Hans Van Borselen		3,025	
37	Ralph Russ		948	
38	Peter Visser		1,064	
39	Bart Tromp		2,983	
40	Louis Emmerij		2,162	
Total:			1,609,408	

== CDA European People's Party ==
Below is the candidate list for the Christian Democratic Appeal for the 1989 European Parliament election

Elected members are in bold

Number	Candidate	Sex	Preference vote	Photo
1	**Jean Penders**	Male	1,535,194	thumbs
2	**Hanja Maij-Weggen**	Female	72,082	thumbs
3	**Bouke Beumer**	Male	21,885	thumbs
4	**Jan Sonneveld**	Male	15,464	
5	**Pam Cornelissen**	Male	20,243	thumbs
6	**Ria Oomen-Ruijten**	Female	65,977	thumbs
7	**Karla Peijs**	Female	3,935	thumbs
8	**Jim Janssen van Raay**	Male	9,774	thumbs
9	**Arie Oostlander**	Male	3,565	
10	**Maxime Verhagen**	Male	3,787	
11	Bartho Pronk	Male	5,704	thumbs
12	N.M. Dijkhuizen		4,160	
13	P.J.M. Thomeer		3,727	
14	A.H.W. Hazenkamp		1,842	
15	J.G.M. Meertens		2,244	
16	Jan Peter Balkenende	Male	2,095	thumbs
17	B.M.R. Exterkate		1,025	
18	H. Schelhaas		1,476	
19	E.M.H. Joosten		2,212	
20	J.H.J. Verburg		1,112	
21	S.P. Hoekstra		4,108	
22	R.A. van Mill		1,342	
23	J.A. Winter		1,171	
24	D.H.A. van Hemmen		1,633	
25	C.W.M. Jongma-Roelants		1,568	
26	J.H.J.Th. Brouwers		1,799	
27	F.H.A.B.M. de Bekker		2,273	
28	C.J.C. Gabor-Koomen		2,562	
29	C.C.L.M. van Nieuwenhuijzen-Bovée		2,062	
30	H.Th.J. Vulto		1,019	
31	J.A. De Boer		1,630	
32	J.P.R.M. van Laarhoven		2,359	
33	M. van der Zwaag		4,269	
34	A.J. Bakker-Osinga		1,082	
35	C.S. Pisuisse		610	
36	J.B.A. Hoyinck		631	
37	G.W. Smallegange		705	
38	A.J. Verhoog-Bokma		848	
39	B. Hemmelder		1,704	
40	M. Musch		3,057	
Total:			1,813,935	

== VVD - European Liberal-Democrats ==
Below is the candidate list for the People's Party for Freedom and Democracy for the 1989 European Parliament election

Elected members are in bold

Number	Candidate	Sex	Preference vote	Photo
1	**Gijs de Vries**	Male	582,011	
2	**Jessica Larive**	Female	51,149	
3	**Florus Wijsenbeek**	Male	8,129	
4	Jan Mulder	Male	4,463	thumbs
5	Chr.R.J. Laffree		6,285	
6	Robert Jan Goedbloed	Male	3,992	
7	H.E. Clevering		3,331	
8	Michel Lodewijks		4,978	
9	Jules Maaten	Male	3,893	
10	T.Th. van Blommestein-Buttinger		3,992	
11	A.J. Geluk		3,787	
12	K.A. Nater		1,180	
13	Walter van Dam		2,917	
14	J.K. Muntinga		1,514	
15	G. van Winkoop		1,195	
16	Leonoor Mout-Kedde		1,712	
17	Joh.P. Witteveen		864	
18	M.M. van der Meij		413	
19	Jan Richard van Reekum		1,274	
20	Pieter Alberti		1,492	
21	Joop Boertjens		824	
22	Ted Jansen		1,225	
23	J.G.C. Wiebenga		2,205	
24	J. van Hemert		764	
25	M.W.M. Vos-van Gortel		3,086	
26	H.J. Sengers-van Gijn		970	
27	A. van Voskuilen		428	
28	J. de Boer		1,139	
29	F.M. Feij		2,216	
30	J.C. van Hasselt		1,193	
31	N.H. van den Broek-Laman Trip		1,426	
32	G.M.J.M. Breukers		2,221	
33	J.M.H. Hosman		381	
34	J. Buzeman		268	
35	F. Mulder		1,066	
36	F. de Wolf		857	
37	Johan Remkes	Male	2,014	thumbs
38	Y.P.M.M. Hagen-Merkus		755	
39	J.I. Hennekey		1,020	
40	W.P. Keur		2,092	
Total:			714,721	

== Rainbow (ppr-psp-cpn-evp-gpn-indep.) ==
Below is the candidate list for Rainbow (ppr-psp-cpn-evp-gpn-indep.) for the 1989 European Parliament election

Elected members are in bold

Number	Candidate	Sex	Preference vote	Photo
1	**Herman Verbeek**	Male	218,486	thumbs
2	**Nel van Dijk**	Female	66,662	
3	John Hontelez		5,273	
4	Wim Herstel		5,407	
5	Bob van Schijndel		11,401	
6	Bert Willemsen		2,026	
7	Anne de Boer		9,320	
8	Saar Boerlage		8,987	
9	Chiel von Meyenfeldt		3,043	
10	Wim de Boer		1,261	
11	Jeannette van Beuzekom		5,222	
12	Dirk Meijers		730	
13	Joe Simmons		548	
14	Hans Feddema		538	
15	Cora Smit-Bon		949	
16	Luppo Leeuwerik		1,601	
17	Jan Muytjens		1,113	
18	Tim Verhoef		635	
19	Conny Braam		1,255	
20	Jan Berghuis		614	
21	Yvonne de Visser		1,216	
22	Tom Pitstra		621	
23	Wim Bot		503	
24	Wim de Heer		752	
25	Corita Honma		312	
26	Trees Lambregts-Brautigam		856	
27	Titia van Leeuwen		877	
28	Albert Moens		187	
29	Tara Oedayraj Singh Varma		2,491	
30	Willem Verf		620	
31	Herman Meijer		1,928	
32	Harrie Winteraeken		451	
33	Wiel Janssen		274	
34	Joosje Lakmaker		634	
35	Joke Paans		637	
36	Annelies Schutte		1,318	
37	Bram van der Lek	Male	6,779	thumbs
Total:			365,527	

== SGP, GPV and RPF ==
Below is the candidate list for SGP, GPV and RPF for the 1989 European Parliament election

Elected members are in bold

Number	Candidate	Sex	Preference vote	Photo
1	**Leen van der Waal**	Male	246,187	
2	Eimert van Middelkoop	Male	38,173	thumbs
3	Rijk van Dam	Male	7,459	
4	Gerrit Holdijk	Male	1,149	thumbs
5	Hans Blokland	Male	1,364	
6	A.W. Biersteker		873	
7	H.A. Hofman		789	
8	M.P.H. van Haeften		582	
9	Peter van Dalen	Male	340	thumbs
10	A.K. van der Staaij		277	
11	S. de Vries		1,430	
12	G.P.A. Beukema		429	
13	G. van den Berg		849	
14	A.H. Poelman		276	
15	P. Langeler		301	
16	H.G. Barendregt		372	
17	A. Kamsteeg		3,595	
18	A. Kadijk		290	
19	M. Houtman		409	
20	P. Dijkstra		473	
21	H. Visser		279	
22	M. Burggraaf		427	
23	J. Douma		351	
24	André Rouvoet	Male	172	thumbs
25	P. Mulder		247	
26	H. Timmermans		118	
27	C.A.E. De Jonge		256	
28	A. de Boer		176	
29	A.J. Verbrugh		392	
30	A. de Graaf		1,027	
Total:			309,059	

== D66 ==
Below is the candidate list for the Democrats 66 for the 1989 European Parliament election

Elected members are in bold

Number	Candidate	Sex	Preference vote	Photo
1	**Jan Willem Bertens**	Male	248,227	
2	Bob van den Bos		9,000	
3	Jopie Boogerd-Quaak		19,281	
4	Hans Glaubitz		3,103	
5	Chel Mertens		3,846	
6	Roelof Jan Manschot		1,641	
7	Arjen Bouter		894	
8	Bert van Wijk		2,049	
9	Jos Koeleman		1,170	
10	Willem Heemskerk		1,661	
11	Henk Potman		658	
12	Theo Meister		924	
13	Pieter Steenwijk		641	
14	Ottie Drijber-Bosscher		3,240	
15	Ton van der Steen		744	
16	Paul Wessels		1,105	
17	Jan Hoekema		723	
18	Herman van der Woude		537	
19	Jan Paul Peters		692	
20	Jeen Postma		838	
21	Ruud Frische		250	
22	Boeddha Kortz		712	
23	Johan Kooistra		1,161	
24	Rick Roelofs Heyrmans		1,119	
25	Elly Nijst-van Egdom		7,757	
Total:			311,973	

== Socialist Party ==
Candidates for the European Parliament from the SP
SP candidates 1989	(1989)
SP candidates 1994	(1994)
SP candidates 1999	(1999)
SP candidates 2004	(2004)
SP candidates 2009	(2009)
SP candidates 2014	(2014)
SP candidates 2019	(2019)
SP candidates 2024	(2024)

Below is the candidate list for Socialist Party for the 1989 European Parliament election

Number	Candidate	Sex	Preference vote	Photo
1	Remi Poppe	Male	23,178	thumbs
2	Anneke de Bres-de Langen		3,252	
3	Tiny Kox	Male	998	thumbs
4	Willem Paquay		358	
5	Bob Ruers		311	
6	Fenna Vergeer-Mudde		311	
7	Theo Cornelissen		323	
8	Mariet Berendsen		267	
9	Jan Marijnissen	Male	992	thumbs
10	Hans van Hooft		316	
11	Paul Jonas		339	
12	Bernhard Gerard		225	
13	Jan de Wit		903	
14	Aart Geervliet		100	
15	Bets Beltman		114	
16	Ger Wouters		345	
17	Peter Verschuren		276	
18	Willem van Meurs		222	
19	Jean Rouwet		187	
20	Jan Heijwegen		165	
21	Fie Buist-van Nierop		46	
22	Gerard Harmes		140	
23	Bram Verduijn		80	
24	Jan Burger		103	
25	Paulus Jansen		77	
26	René Roovers		87	
27	Mienk Graatsma		71	
28	Joke von Pickartz-van Donkelaar		95	
29	Frans Epping		85	
30	Harrie Bouten		364	
Total:			34,330	

== God with Us ==
Below is the candidate list for the God with Us for the 1989 European Parliament election

Number	Candidate	Sex	Preference vote	Photo
1	Oscar Hendriks		15,918	
2	Leontien Bakermans		775	
3	Mirjam Kersten		773	
4	Ted Bakker		321	
5	Elise Boot		1,067	
Total:			18,854	

== Initiative for European Democracy IDE ==
Below is the candidate list for the Initiative for European Democracy IDE for the 1989 European Parliament election

Number	Candidate	Sex	Preference vote	Photo
1	Rikstus Oosterhuis		15,709	
2	Veronique Swinkels		3,343	
3	Margreet Van Dongen		663	
4	Eric Povel		238	
5	Pieter Fetter		149	
6	Maarten Koning		193	
7	Thoma de Boer		142	
8	Marie-Claire van den Broek		260	
9	Jan Willem Cramer		104	
10	leda Ter Laan		110	
11	Philip Blaauw		206	
12	Felix Brabander		58	
13	Adriaan Alma		71	
14	Jos van der Wielen		55	
15	Dick van Reekum		44	
16	Everlien de Ruiter		118	
17	Bert Kerkman		275	
18	Margreet van 't Haaff		101	
19	Martijn van Triest		90	
20	Emiel van Stokkum		52	
21	Arnout Schuijff		43	
22	Maarten Coelingh		34	
23	Sebastiaan Levelt		60	
24	Diana Drost		125	
25	Gervaise Frings		47	
26	Jaap Maljers		39	
27	Jorg Ten Berg		28	
28	Inge Lievaart		68	
29	Hans Bakkenist		84	
30	Herman van den Wall Sake		89	
31	Hendrik Oudman		115	
32	Kasper de Boer		45	
33	Arja Kapitein		105	
34	Luc Smid		434	
Total:			23,297	

== List Janmaat / Centre Democrats ==
Below is the candidate list for the List Janmaat / Centre Democrats for the 1989 European Parliament election

Number	Candidate	Sex	Preference vote	Photo
1	Hans Janmaat	Male	37,381	thumbs
2	Wil Schuurman	Female	532	
3	W. Elsthout		181	
4	F. Castermans		316	
5	R.C. Sangster		57	
6	A.M. Bogaart		72	
7	M.H. de Regt		74	
8	B. Sluijter		237	
9	H.H.A. van der Heijden		259	
10	B. Hubbers-de Boer		101	
11	J. Morren		114	
12	P.J. Van Hulst		101	
13	R.A. Bijloo		28	
14	G.F. Rieff		62	
15	C.C.G. Poetiray		57	
16	J. van Dijk		65	
17	M.J. van 't Ende		65	
18	J. Stoops		24	
19	F. Hofman		84	
20	M.C. Bosman-Galis		42	
21	T.A. van der Sluis		60	
22	O.R. van der Horst		25	
23	J.C. Meijer		20	
24	J. van Prooijen		48	
25	J. Groeneweg		77	
26	E. Verloop		27	
27	J. Rijswijk		44	
28	M. Ter Metz		52	
29	E.C. Karselius		574	
Total:			10,779	

== Sources ==
- Data of the 1989 European Election by the Electoral Committee
