= Corbey =

Corbey is a Dutch surname. Notable people with the surname include:

- Dorette Corbey (born 1957), Dutch politician
- Michael Corbey (born 1963), Dutch business economist, management consultant, and professor
- nl:Raymond Corbey (born 1954), Dutch philosopher and anthropologist
