= Mastenbroek (disambiguation) =

Mastenbroek is a polder in the Netherlands, and a village in that polder.

Mastenbroek may also refer to:

- Rie Mastenbroek (1919–2003), Dutch swimmer, Olympic gold medalist
- Emile Mastenbroek, Dutch politician, Queen's Commissioner of Limburg in the 1990s
- Marieke Mastenbroek, Dutch swimmer, gold medalist in the 1991 European Aquatics Championships
- Edith Mastenbroek (1975–2012), a Dutch Member of the European Parliament
- Jan Mastenbroek, Dutch football manager, Dutch East Indies coach in 1938 FIFA World Cup.
