= Henk Jan Ormel =

Dutch politician (born 1955)

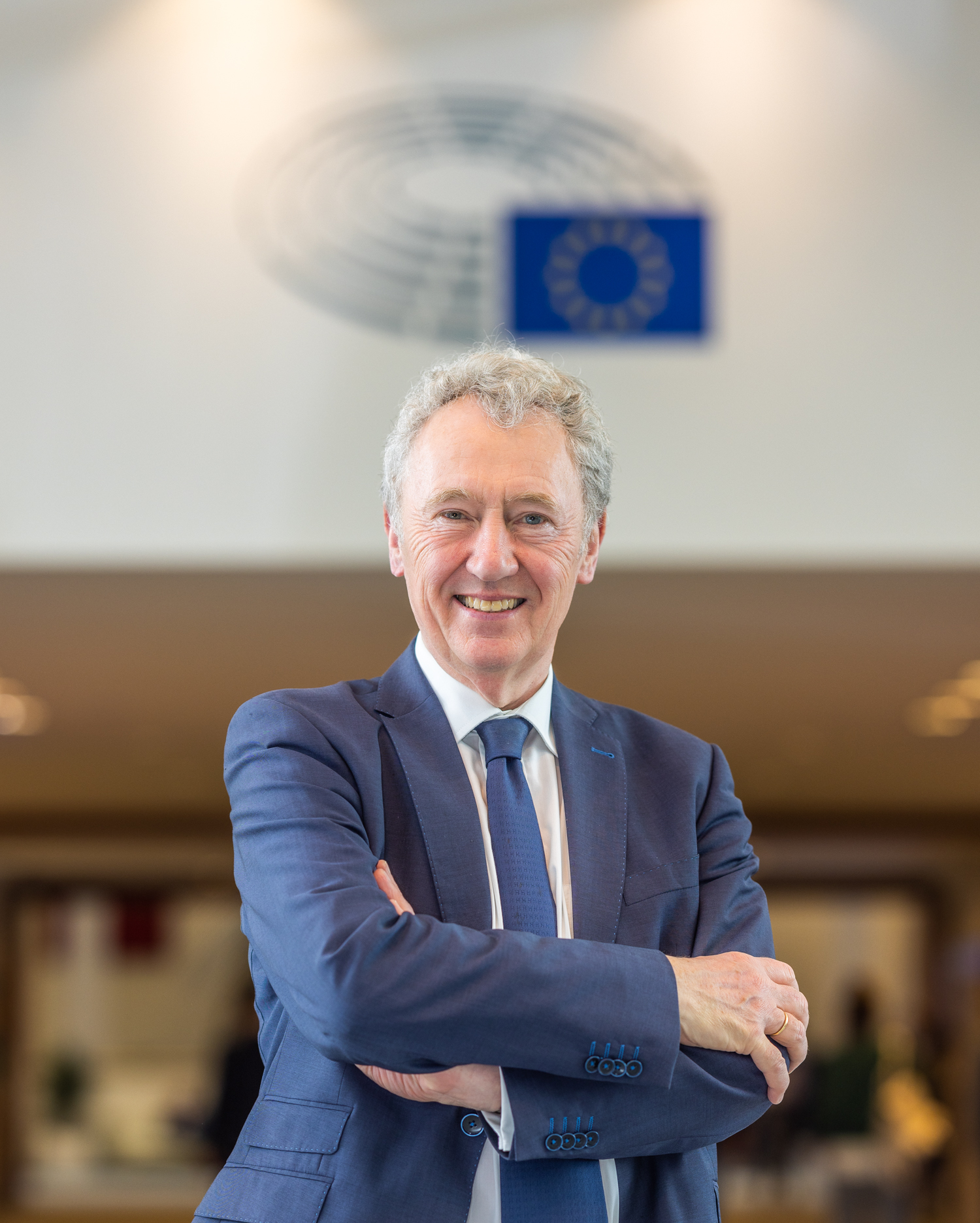
- Henk Jan Ormel in 2024

Member of the European Parliament
- In office 27 February 2024 – 15 July 2024
- Preceded by: Esther de Lange
- Parliamentary group: European People's Party Group
- Constituency: Netherlands

Member of the House of Representatives
- In office 23 May 2002 – 19 September 2012

Personal details
- Born: 15 December 1955 (age 70) Utrecht, Netherlands
- Party: Christian Democratic Appeal (since 1999)
- Occupation: Politician

Hendrik Jan "Henk Jan" Ormel (born 15 December 1955) is a Dutch politician of the Christian Democratic Appeal (CDA).

== Career ==
He was an MP from 23 May 2002 to 19 September 2012, focusing on matters of foreign policy, the European Union, biotechnology, medical ethical affairs and animal welfare. From 2007-2010 he was the Chair of the Committee on Foreign Affairs of the Dutch parliament. From 2008-2010 Ormel was Vice-President of NATO Parliamentary Assembly.

Henk Jan Ormel also sat on the Executive Committee of AWEPA. Ormel began as chief veterinary officer at FAO on 20 September 2012. He was coordinator of anti-microbial resistance (AMR).

He was also the global coordinator of the Global Framework of transboundary Animal Diseases (GF-TADs) and worked as One-Health expert for WHO.

Following the stepping down of Esther de Lange as a Member of the European Parliament, Ormel was sworn in as her successor on 27 February 2024. He was part of the European People's Party Group. Ormel's term came to end on 15 July 2024, as he did not run for re-election in June 2024.

=== European Parliament memberships ===
- Committee on the Environment, Public Health and Food Safety
- Delegation for relations with the People's Republic of China

== Decorations ==
- In 2012 he was awarded Knight of the Order of Orange-Nassau.
