= Esther de Lange =

Dutch politician (born 1975)

Esther de Lange MEP
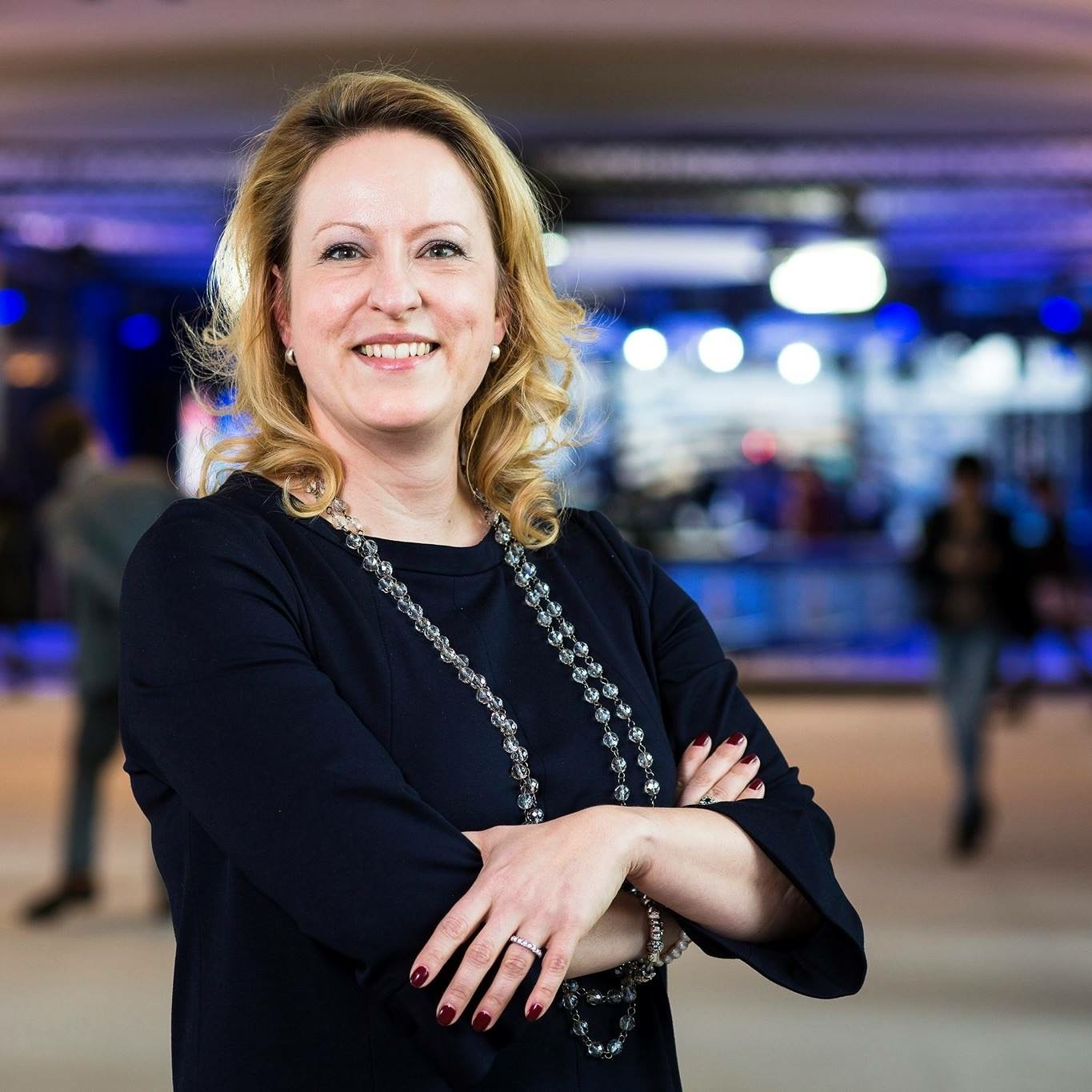

Leader of the Christian Democratic Appeal in the European Parliament
- In office 1 July 2014 – 15 February 2024
- Preceded by: Wim van de Camp
- Succeeded by: Tom Berendsen

Member of the European Parliament
- In office 1 April 2007 – 15 February 2024
- Succeeded by: Henk Jan Ormel
- Constituency: Netherlands

Personal details
- Born: 19 February 1975 (age 51) Spaubeek, Netherlands
- Party: Christian Democratic Appeal
- Other political affiliations: European People's Party
- Children: 1
- Education: Utrecht University, The Hague University of Applied Sciences

Esther M. R. de Lange (Dutch pronunciation: [ˈɛstər də ˈlɑŋə]; born 19 February 1975) is a Dutch politician who served as a Member of the European Parliament (MEP) between 2007 and 2024. A member of the Christian Democratic Appeal (CDA), part of the European People's Party (EPP), she was elected as delegation leader in the European Parliament at a party conference on 2 November 2013 in Leeuwarden, a position she assumed the following year. In July 2014 she was elected as Vice President of the EPP Group in the European Parliament and in June 2018 as Vice President of the EPP Party. De Lange stepped down as MEP in February 2024.

== Political career ==
De Lange assisted MEP Albert Jan Maat from 1999 until 2007. After having been voted Member of the European Parliament in the 2014 European elections, she was elected one of the vice presidents of the EPP Group in the European Parliament, responsible for the relations with national legislatures.

During the 8th parliamentary term De Lange was a member of the Committee on Economic and Monetary Affairs (ECON), and of the Committee on Industry, Research, and Energy (ITRE). In the current parliamentary term, De Lange is a member of the Committee on the Environment, Public Health, and Food Safety (ENVI) and of the Committee on Economic and Monetary Affairs (ECON). She later also joined the Parliament's delegation to the Conference on the Future of Europe (2021) and the Special Committee on the COVID-19 pandemic (2022).

Previously, she was a member of the Committee on the Environment, Public Health, and Food Safety (ENVI); the Committee on Agriculture and Rural Development (AGRI); and the Committee on Budgetary Control (BUDG). Besides that, De Lange was a member of the delegation for relations with India, and was vice-chair of the Delegation for the relations with Iraq.

In addition to her committee assignments, De Lange is also member of the delegations for the EU relations with the United States and Russia. She chairs the MEP Water Group. and is also a member of the European Parliament Intergroup on the Welfare and Conservation of Animals, the European Parliament Intergroup on LGBT Rights and the MEPs Against Cancer group.

In her parliamentary work, De Lange mostly focused on agriculture, food safety, and sustainability. Under the 2009-2014 mandate, she has been actively involved in the revision of the Common Agricultural Policy (CAP). De Lange has been acting as rapporteur on the dossier of food labeling and nutrition for special (medical) use in the European Parliament. In 2013, De Lange acted as the European Parliament's rapporteur on the issue of food fraud in the EU.

Following the 2019 elections, De Lange was part of a cross-party working group in charge of drafting the European Parliament's five-year work program on economic and fiscal policies as well as trade. De Lange received a total of 402.975 preferential votes during the 2019 European Parliament election. Within the centre-right European People's Party Group (EPP) group, De Lange served as one of the deputies of chairman Manfred Weber starting in 2018. In her capacity as vice-chair of the EPP Group she headed the working group on Economy and Environment.

De Lange stepped down as MEP on 15 February 2024 – months before European Parliament elections – to succeed Diederik Samson as head of cabinet of European Commissioner for Climate Action Wopke Hoekstra. She became a knight in the Order of Orange-Nassau in November 2024. Hoekstra received a second term as European Commissioner in December 2024, when the Second von der Leyen Commission was formed. In January 2025, De Lange became head of cabinet of European Commissioner for Agriculture and Food Christophe Hansen.

== Political positions ==
De Lange has been outspoken critic of right-wing populist movements in the EU. For example, she has repeatedly and publicly indicated frustration at Hungary's Fidesz party, which was part of the EPP. De Lange also criticizes the lack in understanding for the situation of parents in the European Parliament. Members of European Parliament cannot take parental leave, cannot have themselves replaced if they are pregnant or gave birth and are automatically recorded as absent. De Lange took her son to then-President of the Parliament Jerzy Buzek when she returned to the European Parliament as an explanation for her absence.

== Personal ==
De Lange has a son and commutes between the village of Driebruggen and Brussels.

== Electoral history ==
Electoral history of Esther de Lange
Year	Body	Party	Pos.	Votes	Result		Ref.
Year	Body	Party	Pos.	Votes	Party seats	Individual	Ref.
2021	House of Representatives	Christian Democratic Appeal	72/78 (Note: Participated as lijstduwer in the electoral districts Rotterdam, Leiden and Dordrecht.)	33	15	Lost	
