= Lily Jacobs =

Dutch politician (born 1951)

Carolina Wilhelmina (Lily) Jacobs (born 2 November 1951 in Heerlen) is a Dutch politician of the Labour Party.

Jacobs grew up in the Limburg mining region and graduated from TUE in 1977. From 1987 to 2003, she was a member of the Provincial Council of Gelderland. In 1994, she became a deputy and would remain until 2001. In 2004, she became alderman of the municipality of Culemborg and from 2007 Jacobs was a member of the European Parliament. As an MEP, she sat on the Agriculture & Rural Development, Transport & Tourism and Climate committees. In 2009 Jacobs was not eligible for election so she became deputy of Economic Affairs, Sustainable Development, Europe and public transport in the province of North Brabant. She held that position until 2011.

== See also ==
- List of members of the European Parliament for the Netherlands, 2004–2009
