= Paul Schaap =

P.A. (Paul) Schaap (Wageningen, 31 January 1950) is a former Dutch military soldier and former employee at the nuclear reactor in Petten. He became well known as a whistleblower within the nuclear reactor Petten. Nowadays Schaap works as a journalist.

== Whistleblower ==
In 2001 Schaap was a Deputy Chief of Staff at the nuclear reactor in Petten. Schaap noticed that the reactor had very tight supply contracts, which resulted in the reactor continuously running even after malfunctions. Schaap addressed this internally in a so-called blackbook, with no result. After that, Schaap decided to address the security problems externally, to the director of the Kernfysische Dienst. Even after promises from the director to let Schaap stay anonymous in the matter, his name became publicly known, which led to a labor dispute. After the conflict, the company he was then working for decided to offer him another job, but this time not at the reactor. It was a daytime job, compared to the nightshifts he previously worked, which would have complications as he also worked at a news agency. Next to that, Schaap also liked working at the reactor facility. This led to him declining the job offer. While having acquired a lot of sympathy, appreciation and attention from the press, Schaap still lost his job. The judge handling the whistleblower case of Schaap concluded that Schaap could not get the status of a whistleblower because he didn't take enough internal action to address the problem and he also went to the press too early. This matter led to Schaap not being able to return to his old function.

After the dilemma Schaap filed a claim of €800,000 at the VROM as compensation for loss of income and pension breach. He eventually got €200,000 as repayment for loss of retirement benefits.

In 2016 Schaap cooperated in the documentary Stank voor dank, where multiple whistleblowers tell their stories about their experiences with going public about wrongdoings of their former employers.
