= Michiel Smit =

Dutch politician (born 1976)

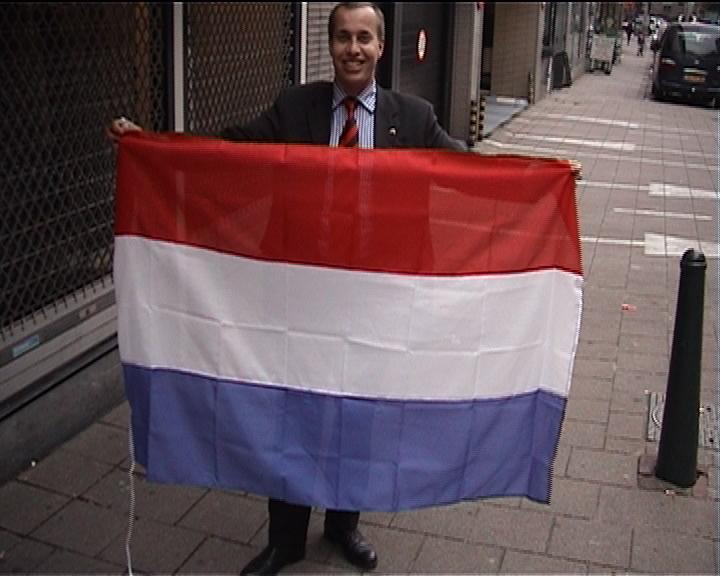
- Michiel Smit (2003)

Municipal Councillor in Rotterdam
- In office 2002–2006

Municipal Councillor in Lansingerland
- In office 2006–2007

Personal details
- Born: Michiel Jorg Smit; 21 August 1976 (age 49) Maasland, Netherlands
- Party: Nieuw Rechts, Leefbaar Rotterdam

Michiel Smit (born 21 August 1976) is a former Dutch politician who was leader of Nieuw Rechts, a far-right political party.

== Political office ==
Michiel Smit was elected to the Rotterdam city council in 2002 as a member of Leefbaar Rotterdam. In February 2003, he came into conflict with Leefbaar-Rotterdam leader Ronald Sørensen and decided to leave the party. After leaving, he founded a new party: Nieuw Rechts. He later joined the municipal council of Lansingerland, but was ousted in September 2007 after it surfaced he did not live in the municipality. He left the council himself citing the pressure of death threats and a hostile attitude of fellow politicians. Nieuw Rechts was dissolved in December that year, with the Lansingerland council seat still vacant and after it appeared Smit was deeply in debt.

== Views ==
He released his first book Nederland op z'n kop in June 2004, just before the European elections. In the book he outlines his views on Dutch society and describes what he sees as the threat of Muslim extremists in the Netherlands.

In his latest book, Veiligheid, doe het ZELF, Smit says that handguns should be legalised in the Netherlands and that doing so will lead to less violent crime.

Smit has made statements against immigration and Islam. In 2003 Smit started to cooperate with the Jewish Defense League, citing the danger to both from the Arab European League. In the same year he demonstrated in Amsterdam against the pedophile association Vereniging MARTIJN as a leader of the Actiecomité Stop MARTIJN.

In 2004, photos of Smit hanging out with white power skinhead friends started circulating on the internet. The following year, he lost a libel case that he started against a talk show guest who had called him a neo-Nazi in 2002. The judge ruled that Smit had given ample reason for the qualification.
