= 1989 European Parliament election in the Netherlands =

- 15 June 1989

25 seats to the European Parliament
- Turnout: 47.48%
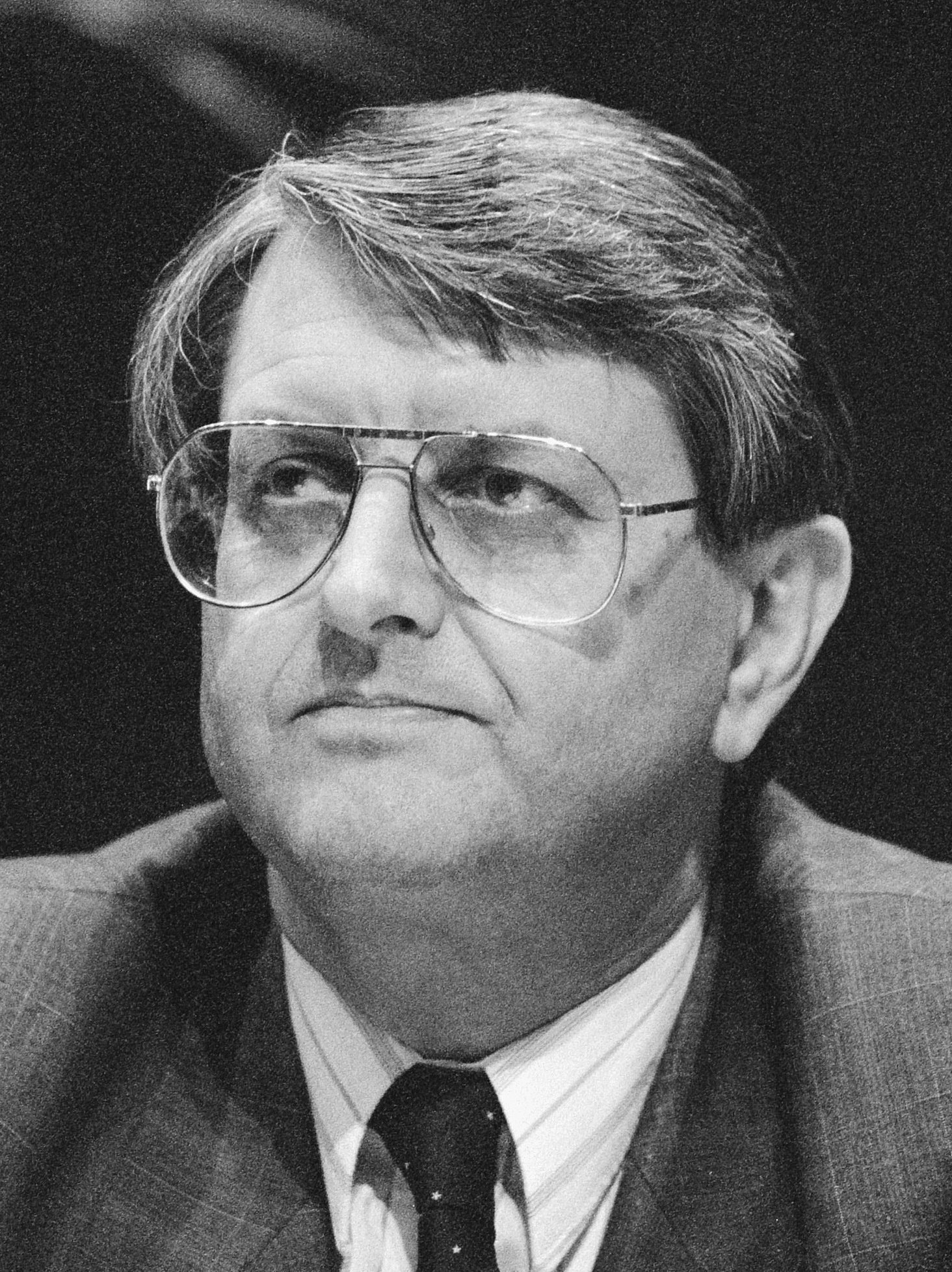

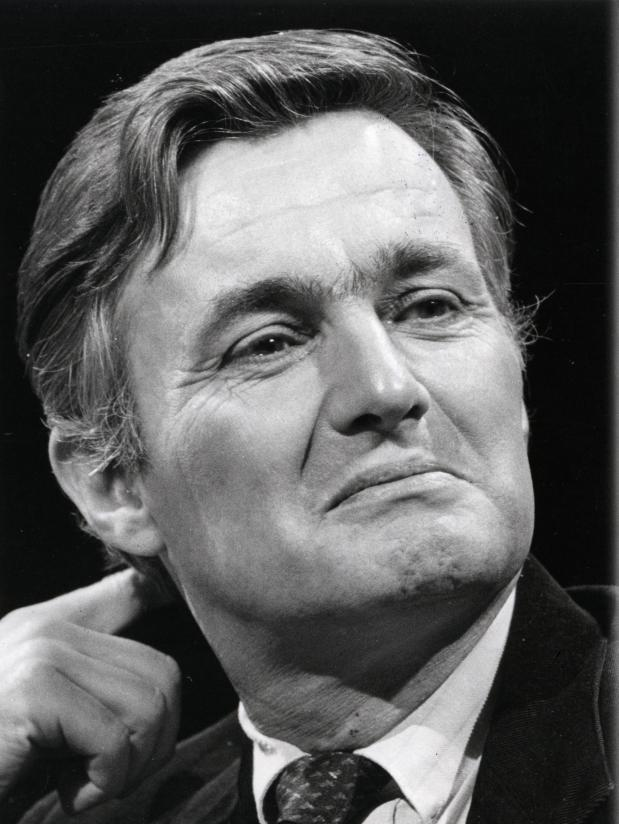

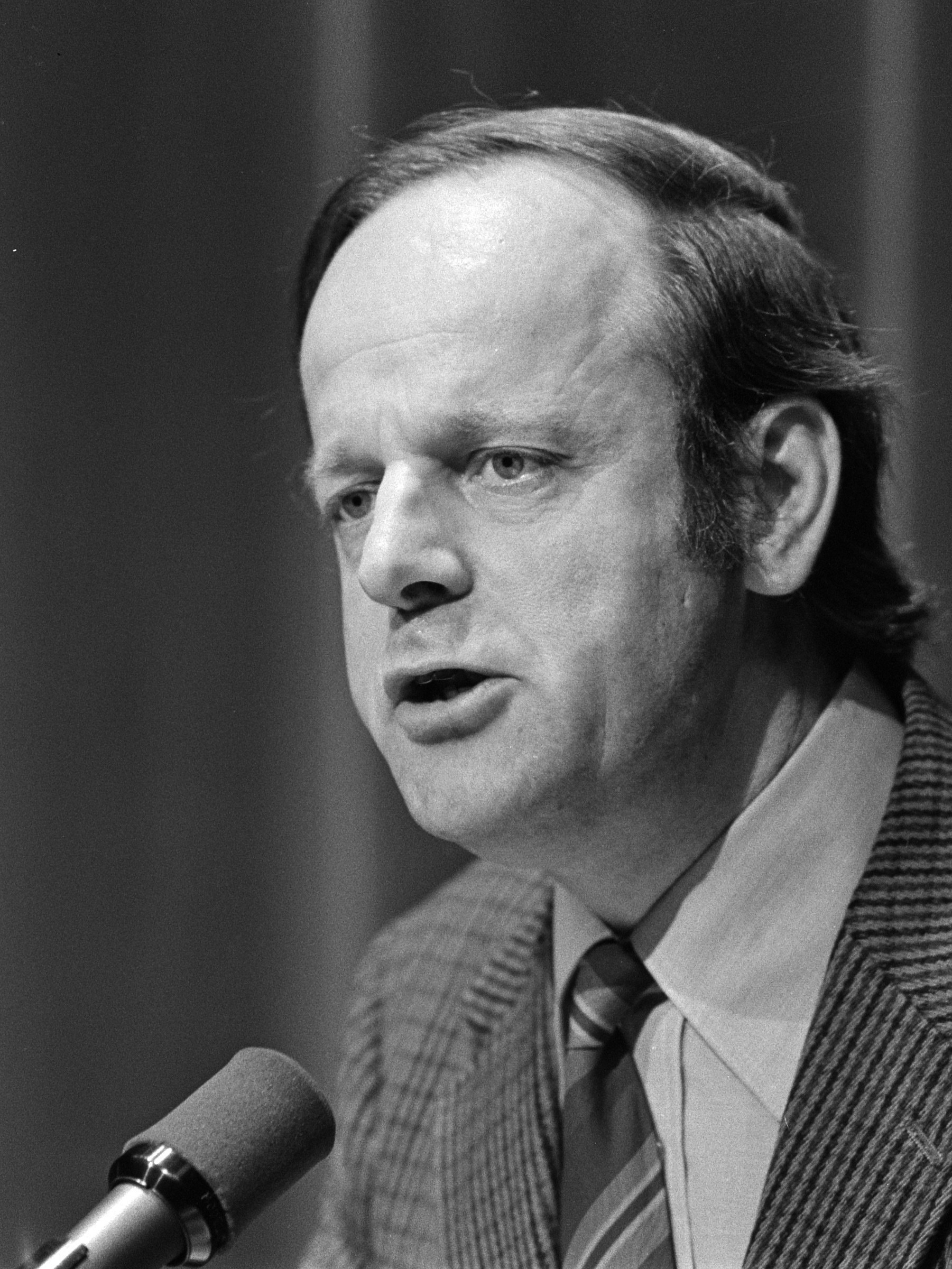

	First party	Second party	Third party
Leader	Jean Penders	Piet Dankert	Gijs de Vries
Party	CDA	PvdA	VVD
Alliance	EPP	SOC	LDR
Seats won	10 / 25	8 / 25	3 / 25
Seat change	1 ▲	0	2 ▼
Popular vote	1,814,107	1,609,626	714,745
Percentage	34.60%	30.70%	13.63%
Swing	4.58% ▲	3.00% ▼	5.30% ▼
	Fourth party	Fifth party	Sixth party
Leader	Herman Verbeek	Jan-Willem Bertens	Leen van der Waal
Party	Rainbow	D66	SGP/RPF/GPV
Alliance	RBW	LDR	NI
Seats won	2 / 25	1 / 25	1 / 25
Seat change	0	1 ▲	0
Popular vote	365,535	311,990	309,060
Percentage	6.97%	5.95%	5.90%
Swing	1.37% ▲	3.67% ▲	0.69% ▲

An election for Members of the European Parliament representing Netherlands constituency for the 1989–1994 term of the European Parliament was held on 15 June 1989. It was part of the wider 1989 European election. Ten parties competed in a D'Hondt type election for 25 seats.

== Background ==
=== Combined lists ===
Several parties combined in one list to take part in this European Election and increase their chance on a seat in the European Parliament. These combined lists are:

1. Rainbow of CPN and PSP, PPR
2. SGP, RPF and GPV

=== Electoral alliances ===
No lists formed an electoral alliance

=== Voting right ===
All Dutch, everywhere in the world were granted voting rights this election. Except for the Dutch living in the Netherlands Antilles and Aruba, because they can vote for the Estates of the Netherlands Antilles. However, if the subject lived for 10 years or longer in the Netherlands they can still vote for the European Elections.

These people got right to vote in this fourth election for the European Parliament in 1989 in the Netherlands:

- Everyone who was allowed to vote in the Dutch parliament elections;
- Dutch who are resident anywhere in the world and did not already have voting rights for the Dutch Parliament elections; (except for Dutch living in the Netherlands Antilles and Aruba, because they vote for the Estates of the Netherlands Antilles. Dutch from the Netherlands Antilles en Aruba are allowed to vote for European Elections if they lived for at least 10 years in the Netherlands.)
- Subjects of one of the other Member States which have residence in the Netherlands. Provided that the state of which they are from granted the same.

=== Numbering of the candidates list ===
The official order and names of candidate lists:

Candidate lists for the 1989 European Parliament election in the Netherlands
List		English translation	List name (Dutch)
1	list	Labour Party/European Socialists	Partij van de Arbeid/Europese Socialisten
2	list	CDA European People's Party	CDA Europese Volkspartij
3	list	VVD - European Liberal-Democrats	VVD - Europese Liberaal-Democraten
4	list	Rainbow (ppr-psp-cpn-evp-gpn-indep.)	Regenboog (ppr-psp-cpn-evp-gpn-onafh.)
5	list	SGP, GPV and RPF	SGP, GPV en RPF
6	list	D66	
7	list	Socialist Party	Socialistiese Partij
8	list	God with Us	God met Ons
9	list	Initiative for European Democracy IDE	Initiatief voor Europese Democratie IDE
10	list	List Janmaat / Centre Democrats	Lijst Janmaat / Centrumdemocraten

== Results ==
In the election the conservative liberal VVD loses seats to the progressive liberal D66, who return to the European parliament after a five-year absence. 47.48% of the Dutch population turned out on election day.

Party	Votes	%	Seats	+/–
Christian Democratic Appeal	1,814,107	34.60	10	+1
Labour Party	1,609,626	30.70	8	0
People's Party for Freedom and Democracy	714,745	13.63	3	–2
Rainbow	365,535	6.97	2	0
Democrats 66	311,990	5.95	1	+1
SGP–GPV–RPF	309,060	5.90	1	0
Centre Democrats	40,780	0.78	0	New
Socialist Party	34,332	0.65	0	0
Initiative for European Democracy	23,298	0.44	0	New
God with Us	18,860	0.36	0	0
Total	5,242,333	100.00	25	0
Valid votes	5,242,333	99.47		
Invalid/blank votes	28,041	0.53		
Total votes	5,270,374	100.00		
Registered voters/turnout	11,099,123	47.48		
Source: Kiesraad

=== European groups ===
Summary of the 15 June 1989 European Parliament elections in the Netherlands
1989
European group		Seats 1984	Seats 1989	Change
European People's Party	EPP	9	10	1 ▲
Confederation of Socialist Parties	SOC	8	8	0
Liberal and Democratic Reformist Group	LDR	5	4	1 ▼
Rainbow Group	RBW	2	2	0
Non-Inscrits	NI	1	1	0
		25	25	0
