= Peter Hartman =

Dutch businessman

Peter F. Hartman (born 1949 in Curaçao) is a Dutch executive and vice-chairman of Air France-KLM. He was CEO of KLM until 2013.

After graduating from high school in 1967, Hartman studied mechanical engineering in Amsterdam, followed by business economics at Erasmus University in Rotterdam, where he received his master's degree. Hartman joined KLM on 29 October 1973 as an employment analyst for the controller’s department at Engineering & Maintenance (E&M). In the years that followed he held various positions as controller in the Netherlands and abroad. In 1984, Hartman was appointed managing director technical contract services and in 1987 he was appointed project manager, Schiphol 2000. On 1 January 1989 he became vice-president KLM ground services, Schiphol. In this capacity he was responsible for all handling processes at Schiphol and at all outstations in KLM's route network. Hartman became senior vice president customer services on 1 October 1990, and in April 1994 he was appointed executive vice president personnel and organization. On 1 January 1996 Hartman took up the post of executive vice president E&M, followed by his appointment on 6 August 1997 to the KLM board of managing directors as COO and later as deputy CEO. Hartman was appointed KLM president and CEO on 1 April 2007.

Hartman is also a member of the following bodies:

- The supervisory board of Kenya Airways Group
- The supervisory board of Stork B.V.
- The supervisory board of CAI – Compagnia Aerea Italiana S.p.A. (Alitalia)
- The supervisory board of the Rotterdam School of Management, Erasmus University
- The supervisory board of Delta Lloyd Group
- Vice chairman ACARE advisory council for aeronautics research in Europe (workgroup European Commission)

Hartman is a former member of the following bodies:

- Chairman of the IATA Board of Governors
- The supervisory board of transavia.com
- The supervisory board of RAI Amsterdam
- Chairman of the Association of European Airlines
