= Camiel Eurlings =

Dutch politician and businessman (born 1973)

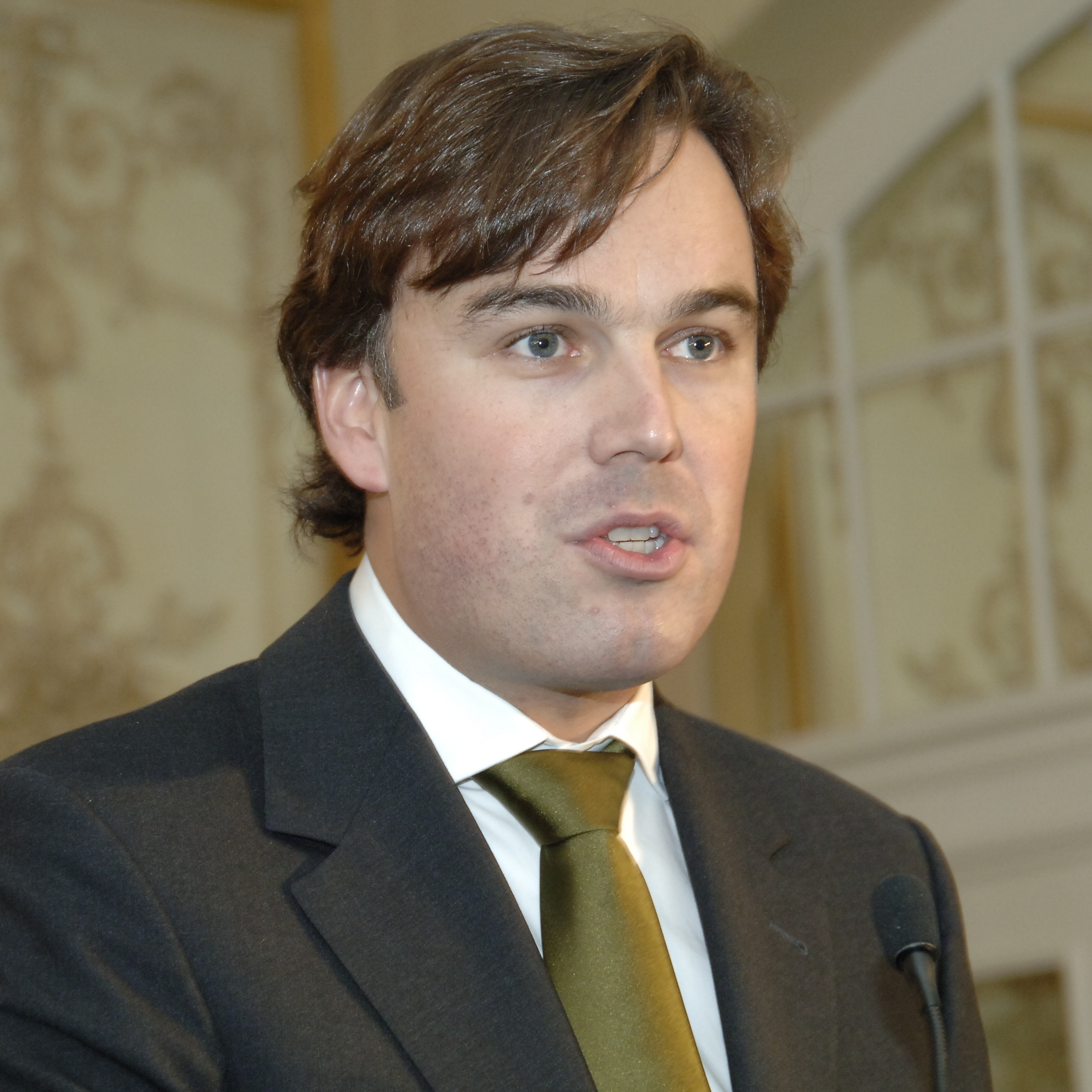
- Eurlings in 2008

Minister of Transport and Water Management
- In office 22 February 2007 – 14 October 2010
- Prime Minister: Jan Peter Balkenende
- Preceded by: Karla Peijs
- Succeeded by: Melanie Schultz van Haegen (Minister of Infrastructure and the Environment)

Member of the European Parliament
- In office 20 July 2004 – 22 February 2007
- Constituency: Netherlands

Member of the House of Representatives
- In office 19 May 1998 – 20 July 2004

Personal details
- Born: Camiel Martinus Petrus Stephanus Eurlings; 16 September 1973 (age 53) Valkenburg aan de Geul, Netherlands
- Party: Christian Democratic Appeal
- Education: Eindhoven University of Technology (Bachelor of Engineering, Master of Engineering)
- Occupation: Politician · Businessman · Corporate director · Sport administrator

Camiel Martinus Petrus Stephanus Eurlings (Dutch pronunciation: [ˈkaːmil ˈøːrlɪŋs]; born 16 September 1973) is a Dutch politician and businessman. A member of the Christian Democratic Appeal (CDA), he served as Minister of Transport, Public Works and Water Management from 2007 to 2010.

A corporate director by occupation, Eurlings was elected as a member of the House of Representatives at the general election of 1998, serving from 19 May 1998 until 20 July 2004, when he was elected as a Member of the European Parliament (MEP) in the European Parliament election of 2004, serving from 20 July 2004 until 22 February 2007. After the general election of 2006, Eurlings was asked to become Minister of Transport, Public Works and Water Management in the Fourth Balkenende cabinet, serving from 22 February 2007 until 14 October 2010.

Eurlings retired from active politics at the age of 37 and became a corporate director and later President and CEO of KLM, serving at the Air France – KLM Group from 15 March 2011 until 16 October 2014. Later he served, amongst others, as Member of the Board of Directors of American Express GBT and currently as Director of Knighthood Capital.

== Biography ==
Eurlings is the eldest son of Martin Eurlings, a former member of the provincial-executive of Limburg, who was elected Mayor of Valkenburg aan de Geul in 2007.

After grammar school in Maastricht, Eurlings began to study Industrial Engineering at Eindhoven in 1993. He was also politically active in his hometown. On 12 April 1994, at age 20, he was elected councillor of his hometown. This made him the youngest councillor at that time. Eurlings graduated cum laude in 1998. At that moment he already was elected as youngest member of the Netherlands National Parliament (Tweede Kamer der Staten-Generaal).

=== Politics ===
Camiel Eurlings was Member of the Netherlands House of Representatives from 1998 until 2004 for the CDA (Christian Democrat Alliance). He was, amongst others, chief spokesman for Transport and for Foreign Affairs.

Eurlings was a former Member of the European Parliamentfrom 2004 until 2007. He sat on the Committee on Foreign Affairs. He also chaired the delegation to the European Union–Russia Parliamentary Cooperation Committee, and was a substitute for the Committee on Civil Liberties, Justice and Home Affairs, the Subcommittee on Human Rights, the Subcommittee on Security and Defence, and the delegation for relations with Israel. He was the European Rapporteur for the Accession of Turkey from 2004 until 2007.

From March 2006 to March 2007 he served as Vice President of the European People's Party (EPP). From 2007 to 2010 he was the Netherlands Minister of Transport, Public Works and Water Management in the Fourth Balkenende cabinet.

=== Business career ===
Eurlings became a corporate director for KLM, leading the Cargo department of Air France and KLM. Under his responsibility the commercial integration of Full Freight company Martinair and Air France – KLM Cargo was effectuated. On 1 July 2013 he succeeded Peter Hartman as the President and CEO of the KLM. In 2014, fellow Dutch executives elected Eurlings as 'Best Manager 2014', followed by Frans van Houten (Philips) and Dick Boer (Ahold). On 15 October 2014, he resigned from his position at KLM.

Eurlings served as a Member of the Alliance Steering Committee of the Board of Directors of GOL Airlines (Brazil) in 2013 and 2014. From 2011 until 2014 Eurlings was a Member of the executive board of the Netherlands Industry and Employers (VNO-NCW). In June 2015, Eurlings added to his LinkedIn page that he had been a member of the board of directors of American Express Global Business Travel since January 2015. He resigned from this position in January 2017.

In February 2018, Eurlings became an advisor to the Board of Directors of Knighthood Capital. In September 2018, he became a Director.

=== Sports ===
Eurlings became an IOC Member at the 125th IOC Session in Buenos Aires in September 2013. He was appointed as the chairman of the IOC Communication Committee.

=== Assault accusation ===
In January 2018, Eurlings resigned from the IOC following an accusation made against him. The complaint was filed in 2015 by a woman who said she was attacked by Eurlings. She suffered injuries including damage to her eye, torn earlobes and a broken elbow. Police in Haarlem confirmed that a formal complaint was filed in December of that year. The accusation was settled out of court without establishment of guilt by the Public Prosecution Service and without admission of guilt by Eurlings. The settlement was entered into the Justicial Registration with a note, which formally is not a criminal record.

== Personal Life ==
On 17 September 2026, Eurlings was slightly injured during a KLM flight to Curaçao when his powerbank exploded 5 1/2 hours after takeoff. The plane returned safely to Amsterdam, and nearby passengers noted that, contrary to KLM regulations, he was charging the powerbank when it caught fire.

== Decorations ==
Honours
Ribbon bar	Honour	Country	Date	Comment
	Officer of the Order of Orange-Nassau	Netherlands	3 December 2010	
	Knight of the Order of the Holy Sepulchre	Holy See		

Political offices
Preceded by Karla Peijs	Minister of Transport and Water Management; 2007–2010	Succeeded by Melanie Schultz van Haegen as Minister of Infrastructure and the Environment
Business positions
Preceded by Peter Hartman	CEO and President of KLM; 2013–2014	Succeeded by Pieter Elbers
