= 2004 European Parliament election in the Netherlands =

- 10 June 2004

27 seats to the European Parliament
- Turnout: 39.26%
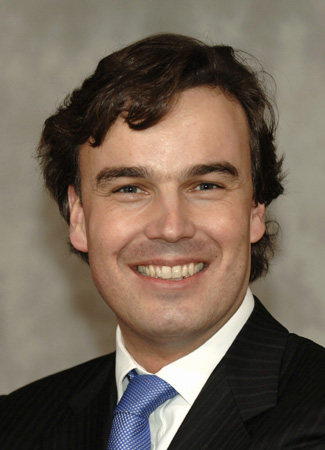

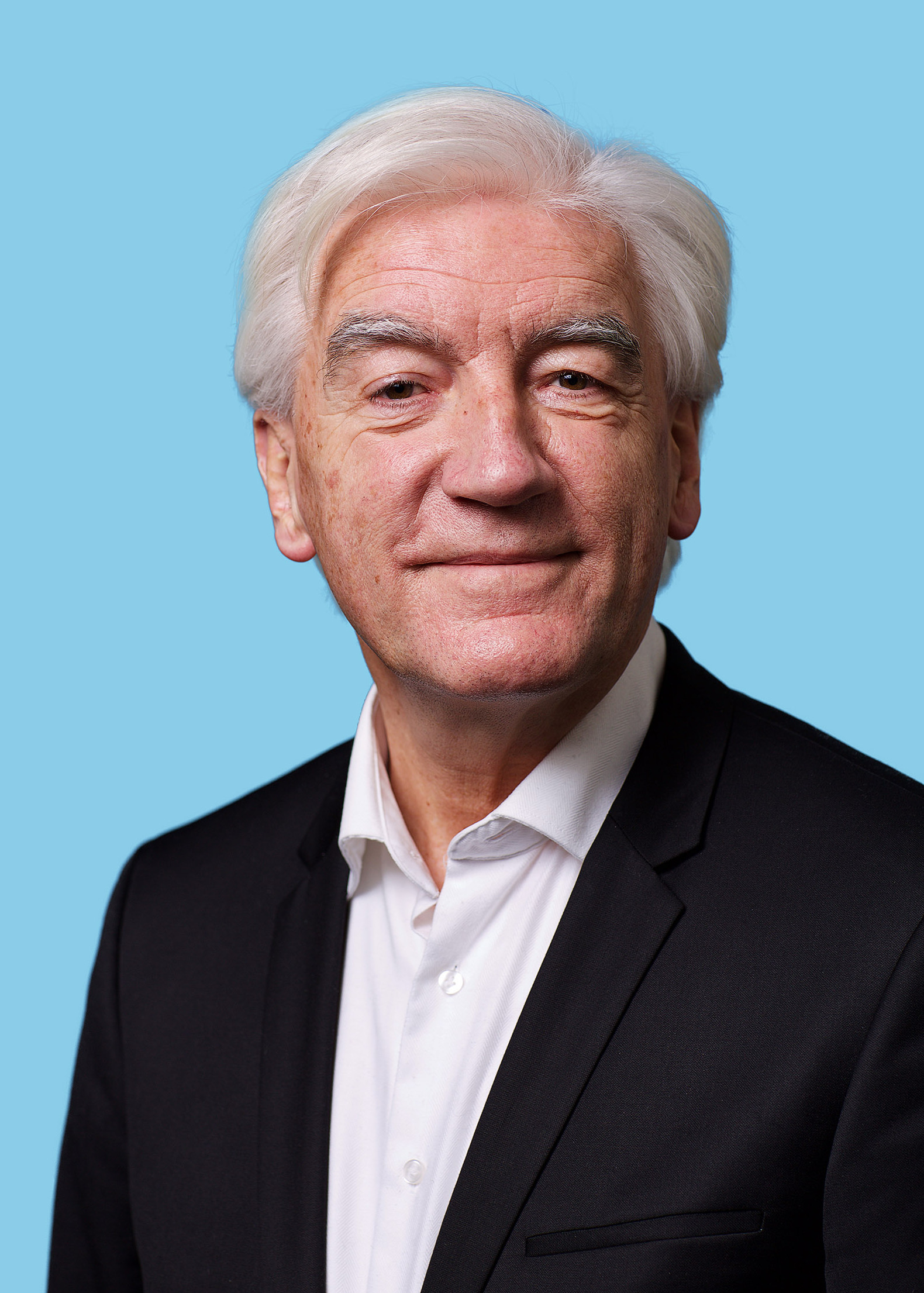

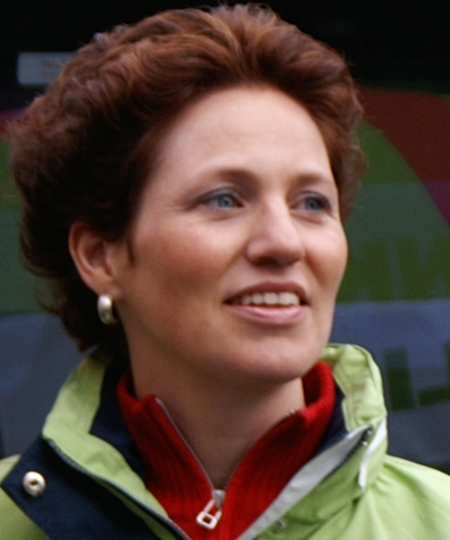

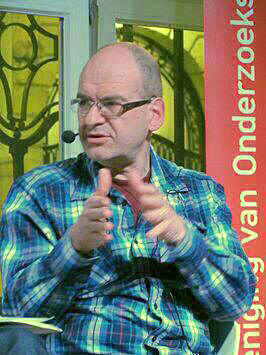

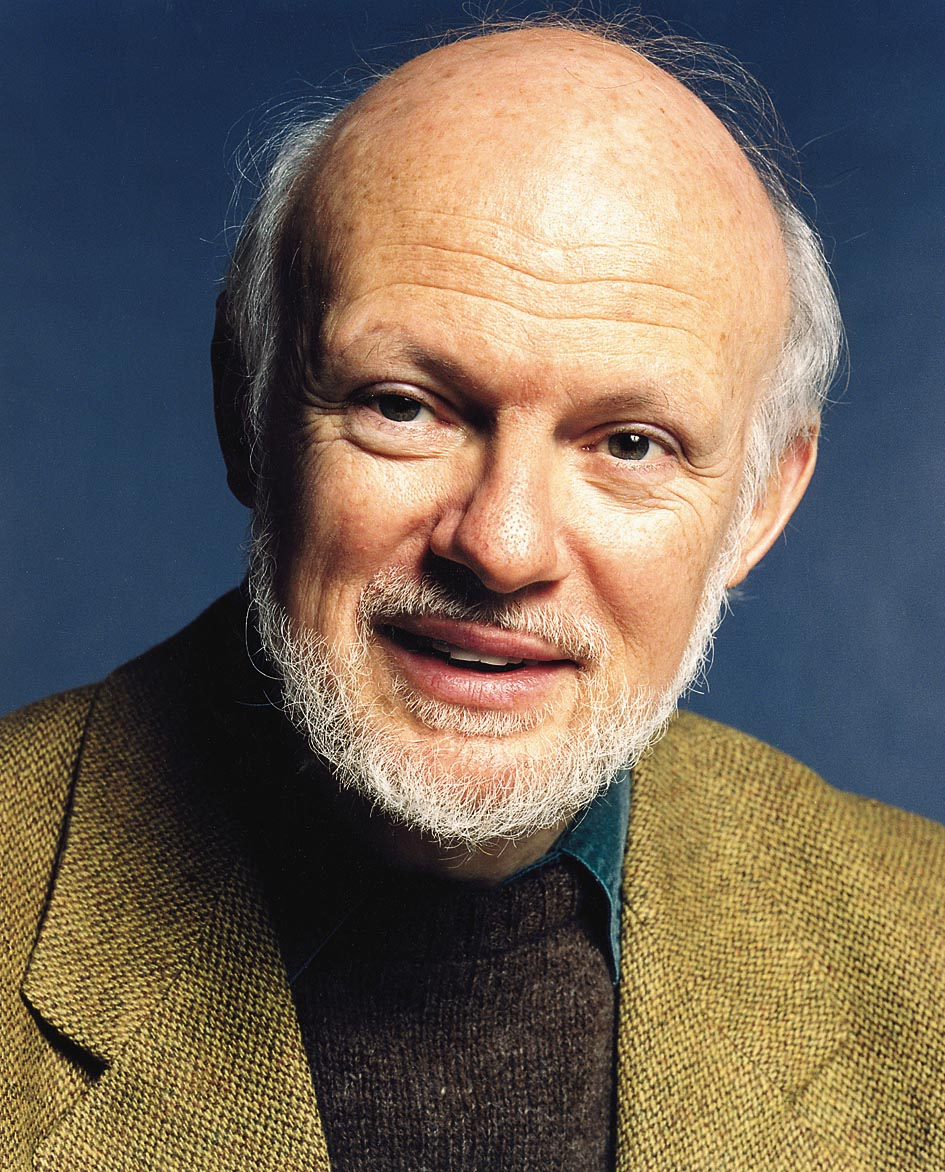

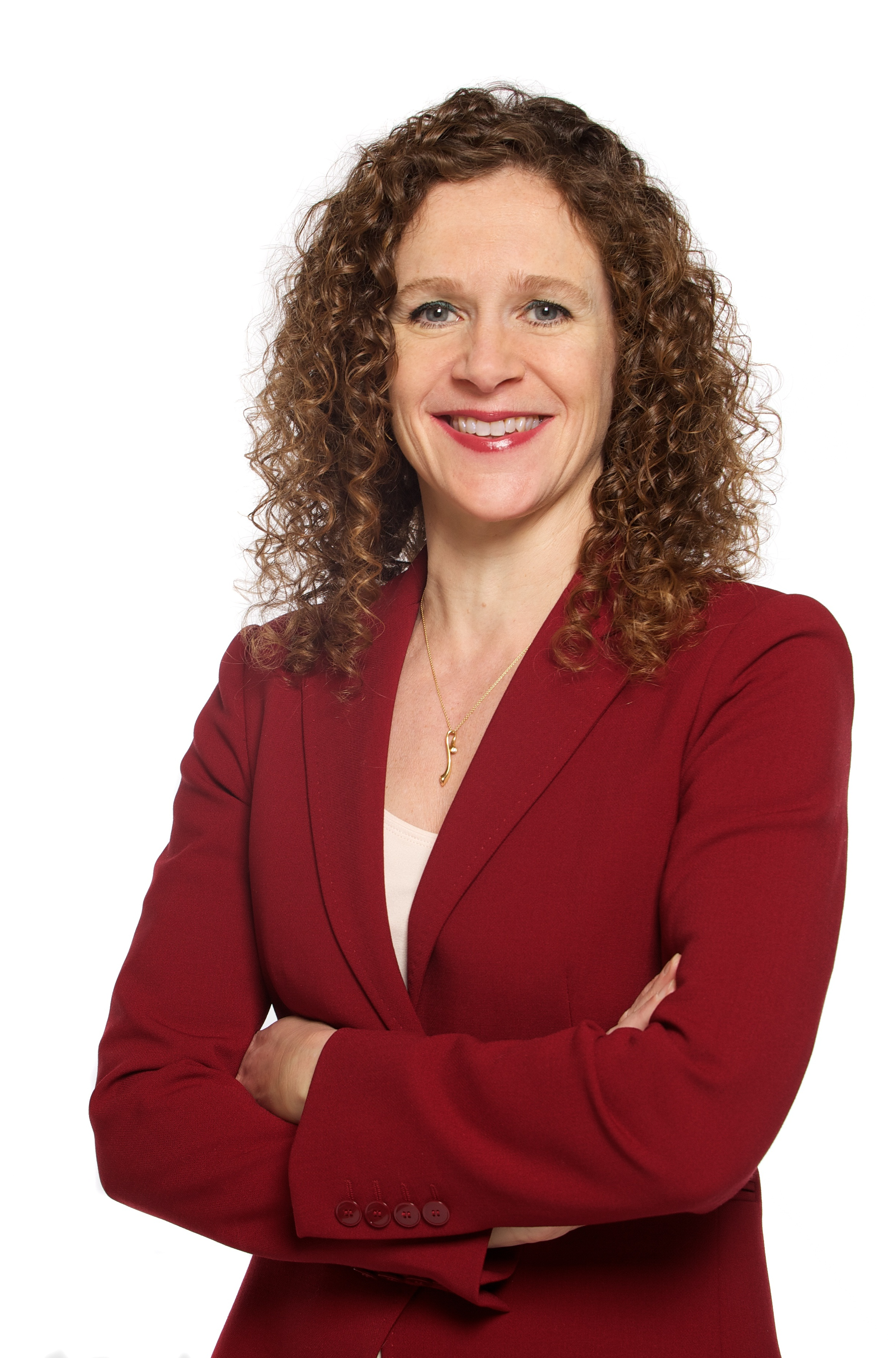
	First party	Second party	Third party
Leader	Camiel Eurlings	Max van den Berg	Jules Maaten
Party	CDA	PvdA	VVD
Alliance	EPP-ED	PES	ALDE
Seats won	7 / 27	7 / 27	4 / 27
Seat change	2 ▼	1 ▲	2 ▼
Popular vote	1,164,431	1,124,549	629,198
Percentage	24.43%	23.60%	13.20%
Swing	2.51% ▼	3.49% ▲	6.49% ▼
	Fourth party	Fifth party	Sixth party
Leader	Kathalijne Buitenweg	Paul van Buitenen	Erik Meijer
Party	GL	ET	SP
Alliance	Greens-EFA	Greens-EFA	EUL/NGL
Seats won	2 / 27	2 / 27	2 / 27
Seat change	2 ▼	2 ▲	1 ▲
Popular vote	352,201	349,156	332,326
Percentage	7.39%	7.33%	6.97%
Swing	4.46% ▼	new	1.93% ▲
	Seventh party	Eighth party
Leader	Hans Blokland	Sophie in 't Veld
Party	CU–SGP	D66
Alliance	ID	ALDE
Seats won	2 / 27	1 / 27
Seat change	1 ▼	1 ▼
Popular vote	279,880	202,502
Percentage	5.87%	4.25%
Swing	2.27% ▼	1.55% ▼

An election of Members of the European Parliament representing Netherlands constituency for the 2004–2009 term of the European Parliament was held on 10 June 2004. It was part of the wider 2004 European election. Fifteen parties competed in a D'Hondt type election for 27 seats (down from 31).

== Background ==
=== Combined lists ===
Several parties combined in one list to take part in this European Election and increase their chance on a seat in the European Parliament. These combined lists are:

1. Christian Union and SGP

=== Electoral alliances ===
Several parties formed an electoral alliance:

1. PvdA/European Social-Democrats and GreenLeft
2. CDA/European People's Party and Christian Union-SGP
3. VVD/European Liberal-Democrats and Democrats 66

The alliance between Christian Democratic Appeal and Christian Union-SGP cost the Christian Democratic Appeal a seat, which goes to Christian Union-SGP. Other alliances had no effect on the result.

=== Treaty of Nice ===
The exact number of seats allocated to each country is determined by the treaties, currently the Treaty of Nice, and is adjusted by the accession treaty of each new member. Hence no change to the seats occurs without ratification by all states. According to the treaties, the maximum number of members in the Parliament is 732. This why the seats for the Netherlands was reduced from 31 to 27

=== Numbering of the candidates list ===
The official order and names of candidate lists:

Candidate lists for the European Parliament election in the Netherlands
2004
Lists
List		English translation	List name (Dutch)
1	list	CDA - European People's Party	CDA – Europese Volkspartij
2	list	P.v.d.A./European Social Democrats	P.v.d.A./Europese Sociaaldemocraten
3	list	VVD - European Liberal-Democrats	VVD – Europese Liberaal-Democraten
4	list	GREENLEFT	GROENLINKS
5	list	Christian Union-SGP	ChristenUnie–SGP
6	list	Democrats 66 (D66)	Democraten 66 (D66)
7	list	SP (Socialist Party)	SP (Socialistische Partij)
8	list	Democratic Europe	Democratisch Europa
9	list	LIVABLE EUROPE	LEEFBAAR EUROPA
10	list	Party for the North	Partij voor het Noorden
11	list	New Right	Nieuw Rechts
12	list	Europe Transparent	Europa Transparant
13	list	List Pim Fortuyn (LPF)	Lijst Pim Fortuyn (LPF)
14	list	Party for the Animals	Partij voor de Dieren
15	list	Respect.now	Respect.Nu

== Results ==
According to the European Commission, the publication of national results prior to Sunday evening is considered illegal. However, all the municipalities in the Netherlands published the results on Thursday, giving the media the opportunity to give an almost complete national result, only missing votes cast abroad. The complete and official result were publicised according to the rules.

The ruling centre-right parties, the Christian Democratic Appeal and the People's Party for Freedom and Democracy polled poorly, while the opposition Labour Party and Socialist Party gained ground. The anti-fraud party Europe Transparent of whistleblower Paul van Buitenen unexpectedly won two seats. Voter turnout was 39.26%, a lot higher than the turnout in 1999 30.02%.

Party	Votes	%	Seats	+/–
Christian Democratic Appeal	1,164,431	24.43	7	–2
Labour Party	1,124,549	23.60	7	+1
People's Party for Freedom and Democracy	629,198	13.20	4	–2
GroenLinks	352,201	7.39	2	–2
Europe Transparent	349,156	7.33	2	New
Socialist Party	332,326	6.97	2	+1
Christian Union – Reformed Political Party	279,880	5.87	2	–1
Democrats 66	202,502	4.25	1	–1
Party for the Animals	153,432	3.22	0	New
Pim Fortuyn List	121,509	2.55	0	New
Party for the North	18,234	0.38	0	New
New Right	15,732	0.33	0	New
Liveable Europe	9,144	0.19	0	New
Democratic Europe	8,780	0.18	0	New
Respect.now	4,603	0.10	0	New
Total	4,765,677	100.00	27	–4
Valid votes	4,765,677	99.76		
Invalid/blank votes	11,444	0.24		
Total votes	4,777,121	100.00		
Registered voters/turnout	12,168,878	39.26		
Source: Kiesraad

=== European groups ===
The EPP-ED group lost 2 seats, making it just as big as the PES group. The ELDR becomes 3rd group after PES. After the elections ELDR and European Democratic Party (EDP) formed a new European Group named ALDE in the European parliament. The EDP did not have member party's in the Netherlands. Also the Europe of Democracies and Diversities (EDD) group reforms itself with party's from Eastern-Europe. They rename their group to Independence/Democracy (ID). The Christian Union – Reformed Political Party is part of this new group.

Summary of the 10 June 2004 European Parliament elections in the Netherlands
2004
European group		Seats 1999	Seats 2004	Change
European People's Party–European Democrats	EPP-ED	9	7	2 ▼
Party of European Socialists	PES	6	7	1 ▲
Alliance of Liberals and Democrats for Europe	ALDE	8	5	3 ▼
The Greens–European Free Alliance	Greens-EFA	4	4	0
European United Left–Nordic Green Left	EUL-NGL	1	2	1 ▲
Independence/Democracy	IND&DEM	3	2	1 ▼
Non-Inscrits	NI	0	0	0
		31	27	4 ▼

=== 5 largest municipalities ===
Results in the five largest municipalities
Municipality	CDA	PvdA	VVD	GL	ET	SP	D66	CU–SGP	Others
Amsterdam	7.7 (14 665)	28.3 (53 743)	11.2 (21 347)	17.8 (33 876)	7.3 (13 768)	10.1 (19 241)	6.9 (13 030)	0.9 (1 782)	9.8 (18 560)
Rotterdam	13.7 (18 788)	31.0 (42 543)	11.5 (15 764)	8.2 (11 216)	7.3 (9 981)	8.5 (11 705)	4.6 (6 371)	3.5 (4 762)	11.7 (16 084)
The Hague	16.0 (18 021)	24.9 (28 154)	17.1 (19 284)	9.1 (10 254)	7.4 (8 357)	6.5 (7 306)	6.5 (7 334)	2.3 (2 562)	10.4 (11 698)
(Utrecht (municipality)) Utrecht	12.9 (11 285)	23.9 (20 900)	12.1 (10 523)	18.7 (16 287)	6.2 (5 384)	9.7 (8 423)	8.3 (7 272)	2.2 (1 946)	6.0 (5 281)
Eindhoven	20.5 (11 420)	24.7 (13 738)	13.1 (7 303)	9.0 (4 994)	8.3 (4 634)	10.9 (6 091)	5.8 (3 229)	1.4 (770)	6.2 (3 475)
