= Europe Transparent =

Europe Transparent Europa Transparant
- Leader: Paul van Buitenen
- Leader in the European Parliament: Paul van Buitenen
- Founded: 8 April 2004
- Dissolved: 2008
- Ideology: Anti-corruption
- Political position: Big tent
- European Parliament group: EGP/EFA

Website
- europatransparant.nl

Europe Transparent (Dutch: Europa Transparant) was a political party in the Netherlands. The party's founder, Paul van Buitenen, announced its establishment on 8 April 2004. In the 2004 European Parliament election the party gained two seats, after a campaign that cost no more than €4,000. Van Buitenen and the number two on the list, Els de Groen, who had written about corruption scandals in Eastern Europe, joined the Greens–European Free Alliance party group as independent members. It has not contested an election since 2004.

The party claimed to be non-ideological; they aimed to fight for more open European government, against fraud, corruption and favouring of friends. Because the pursuit of this goal was their primary occupation, they participated only to a limited extent in the normal system of debates, reports, meetings, etc.

Their ultimate goal was to be able to disband themselves when they had made the European Union transparent.

== European Election results ==
Election	List	Votes	%	Seats	+/–	Notes
2004	List	349,156	7.33	2 / 27	new	
