= Albert Jan Maat =

Dutch politician and Member of the European Parliament (born 1953)

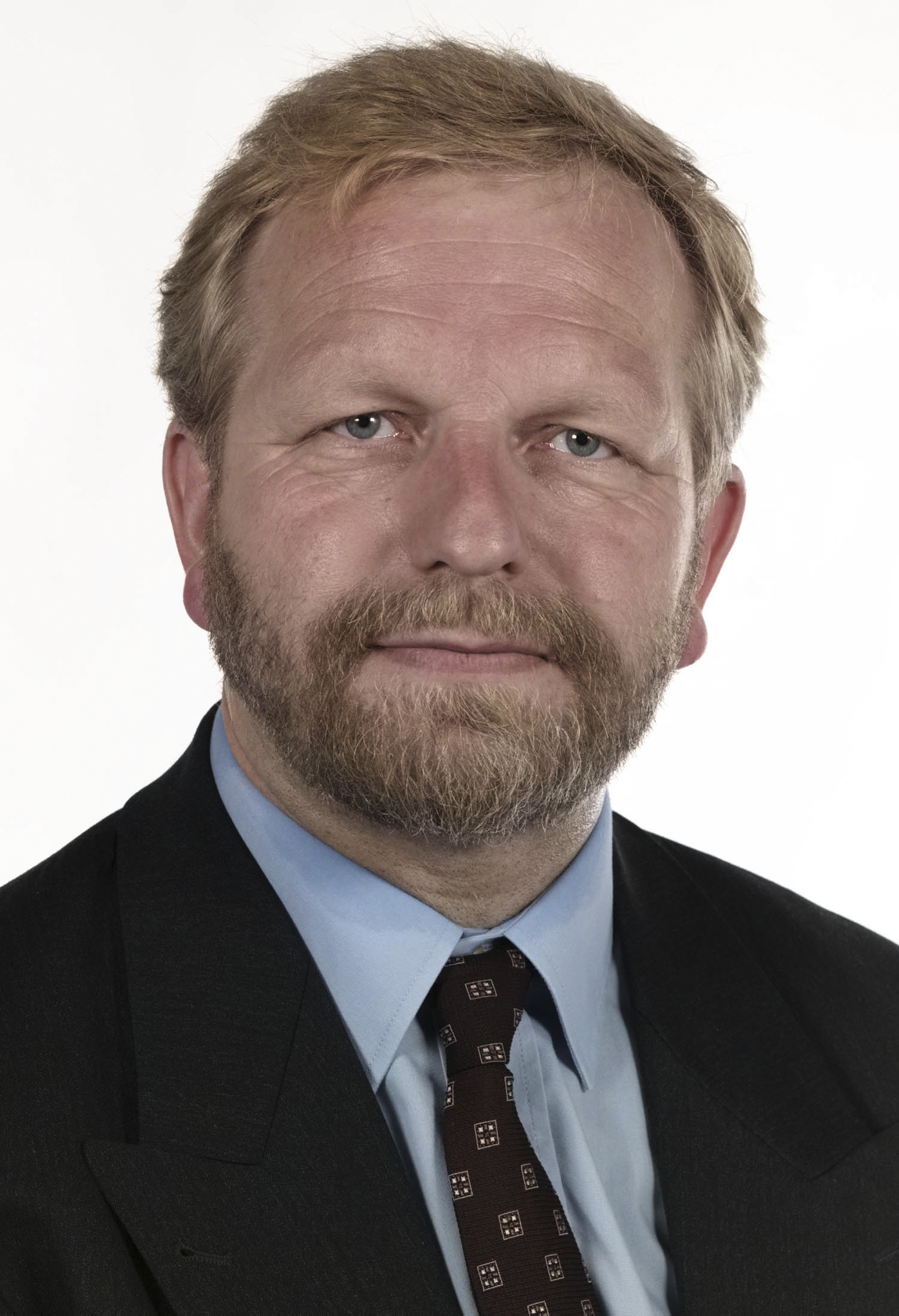
- Maat in 1999

Member of the European Parliament
- In office 20 July 2004 - April 9, 2007
- In office 20 July 1999 – 19 July 2004
- Parliamentary group: European People's Party Group

City Councillor
- In office 1990 - 1997
- Constituency: Eelde

Personal details
- Born: February 8, 1953 (age 73)
- Party: Christian Democratic Appeal

Albert Jan Maat (Dutch pronunciation: [ˈɑlbər tɕɑ ˈmaːt]; born 8 February 1953 in Heino, Overijssel) is a Dutch politician. Since 7 April 2016, he has served as the chairman of NetVISwerk. From 1999 to early 2007, he was a Member of the European Parliament. He is a member of the Christian Democratic Appeal, which is part of the European People's Party. He also served as the chairman of the Dutch Agriculture and Horticulture Association.

== Career ==
Maat's career began in 1990 when he was elected as City Councillor of Eelde.

He was first elected to the European Parliament on 20 July 1999 with the European People's Party. His term formally expired on 19 July 2004. He was reelected to a second term on 20 July 2004.

During his term, he sat on the European Parliament's Committee on Agriculture and Rural Development and its Committee on Fisheries.

He was also a substitute for the Committee on Budgetary Control, the Committee on Budgets, the Subcommittee on Human Rights, and the delegation to the EU–Chile Joint Parliamentary Committee. He was vice-chair of the delegation to the EU–Kazakhstan, EU–Kyrgyzstan and EU–Uzbekistan Parliamentary Cooperation Committees, and for relations with Tajikistan, Turkmenistan and Mongolia.

From 10 April 2007 to 1 October 2016, he served as the chairman of the Dutch Agriculture and Horticulture Association.

On 20 September 2013, Maat was elected as President of COPA-COGECA for a term of two years.

== Honours ==
On 4 October 2016, for his service as Chairman of the Dutch Agriculture and Horticulture Association, he was awarded the Order of Orange-Nassau by State Secretary Martijn van Dam.
