= Edith Mastenbroek =

Dutch politician (1975–2012)

Edith Mastenbroek (23 March 1975 – 23 August 2012) was a Dutch politician and Member of the European Parliament (MEP). She was a member of the Labour Party, which is part of the Party of European Socialists, and sat on the European Parliament's Committee on Budgetary Control and its Committee on Civil Liberties, Justice and Home Affairs. She was also a substitute for the Committee on Legal Affairs and a member of the delegation for relations with Israel.

She was rapporteur for the Safer Internet Plus Programme at the start of her term in the European Parliament. She was active on anti-terrorism, information security, data protection and privacy, and on seeking alternatives to Strasbourg as a meeting place for the European Parliament once a month. She was a core member of the Campaign for Parliamentary Reform (CPR).

She was also an observer on the European Security Research Advisory Board. She was president and Chairwoman of the European chapter of the Global Organisation of Parliamentarians Against Corruption (GOPAC).

On 23 August 2012 Mastenbroek died due to cardiac arrest at the age of 37.

== Career ==
- Higher degree in political science (specialising in international relations) (2000)
- Trainee with the Democratic Leadership Council, Washington, D.C. (2000)
- Senior researcher with Infodrome - a think tank for the information society (2001–2002)
- Public affairs official/spokesperson for the ISP xs4all (2002–2004)
- Coordinator of the 'Niet Nix' innovation movement (1999)
- Assisted the PvdA election programme committee (2001)
- Member of the PvdA PES delegation (1998–2004)
- Member of the executive committee of the 'Ben je bang voor mij?' foundation (Are you afraid of me?) - for dialogue on Islam and integration (since 2002)
