= Dorette Corbey =

Dutch politician (born 1957)

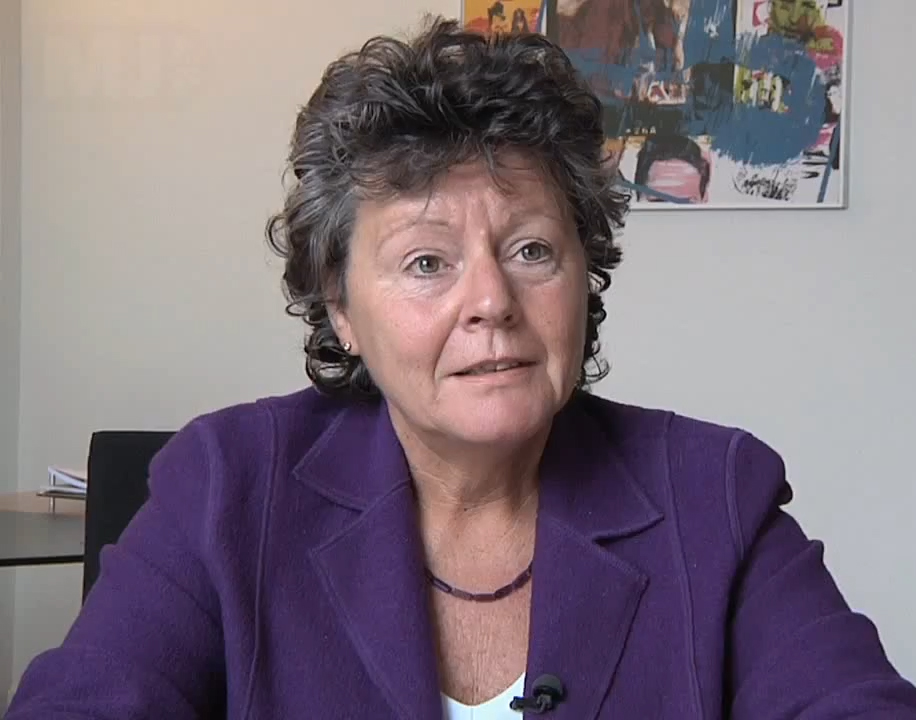
Dorette Corbey, 2012

Dorette Corbey (born July 19, 1957, in Eindhoven, North Brabant) is a Dutch politician and former Member of the European Parliament (MEP). She is a member of the Partij van de Arbeid (Dutch Labour Party), which is part of the Party of European Socialists, and sat on the European Parliament's Committee on the Environment, Public Health and Food Safety.

She was also a substitute for the Committee on Industry, Research and Energy and a member of the delegation for relations with the People's Republic of China.

== Education ==
- General nursing training
- Higher degree in social geography, University of Amsterdam
- Doctoral degree in law and international relations, State University of Leiden

== Career ==
- 1976-1988: Worked as a general nurse (part-time from 1981)
- 1988-1993: Researcher, Netherlands Institute for International Relations, 'Clingendael', The Hague
- 1993-1999: Policy adviser, Building and Timber Federation, FNV (Dutch Trade Union Federation)
- 1996-1997: Project coordinator - European Works Councils, European Federation of Building and Woodworkers, Brussels
- 1997-1999: Member of the European Integration Committee of the Advisory Council on International Affairs
- since 1999: Member of the European Parliament
