= Jules Maaten =

Dutch politician

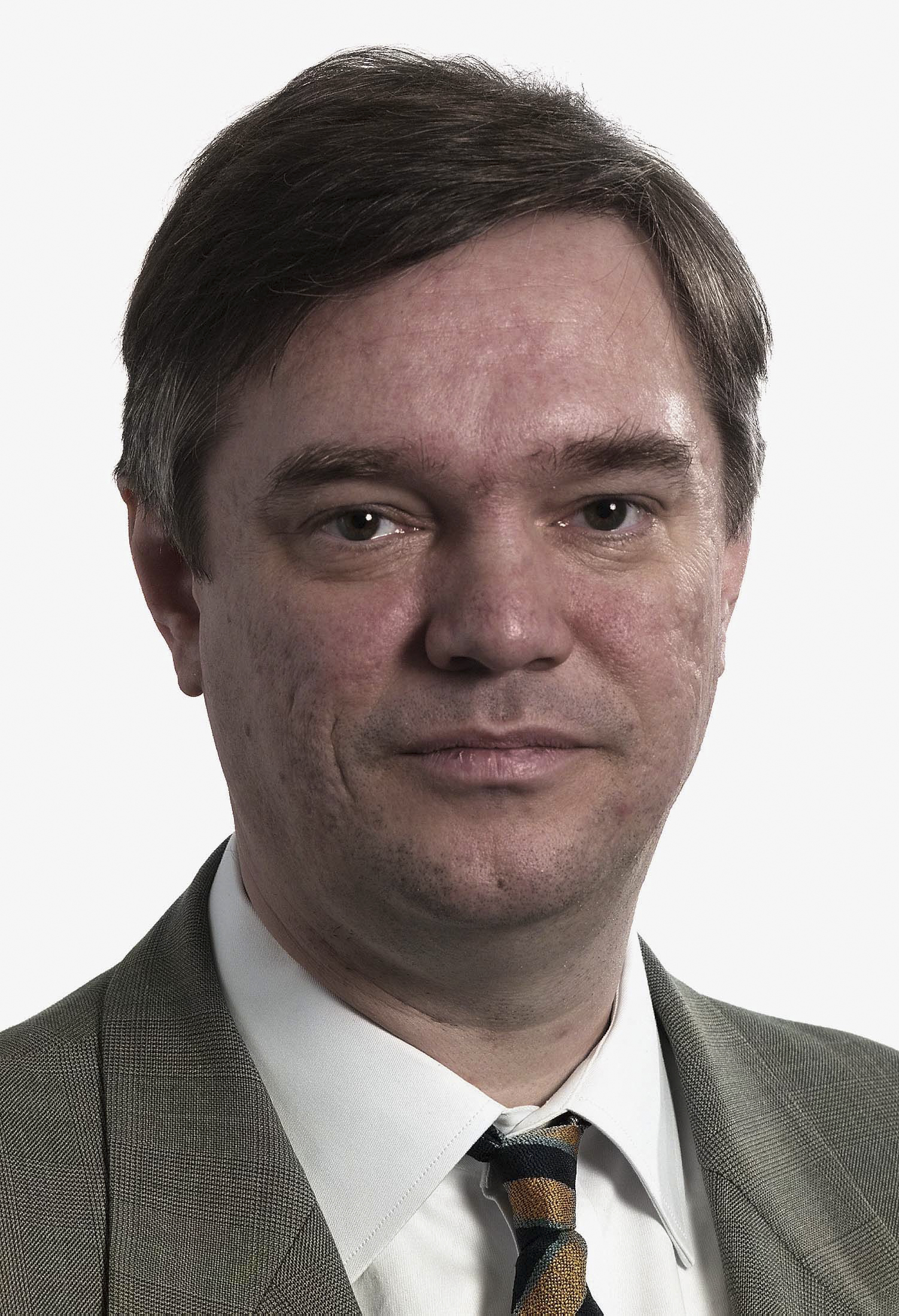
- Maaten in 1999

Member of the European Parliament
- In office 1999–2009
- Constituency: Netherlands

Personal details
- Born: 17 April 1961 (age 64) Nieuwer-Amstel, Netherlands
- Party: People's Party for Freedom and Democracy
- Website: Jules Maaten

Jules Maaten (born 17 April 1961) is a Dutch politician and since August 2022 Regional Director of the European Dialogue office in Brussels of the Friedrich Naumann Foundation for Freedom (FNF). Prior to that he was FNF Head of International Regions at the Headquarters in Potsdam (2020-2022), FNF Regional Director for sub-Sahara Africa, based in Johannesburg (2016-2020) and FNF country director in the Philippines (2010-2016), supporting projects for good governance, human rights, free trade and introduced the annual Africa Freedom Prize and in Manila the "It's All About Freedom"-project that includes an annual Freedom Run against corruption.

== Life ==
From 1999 to 2009 he was a Member of the European Parliament for the Dutch People's Party for Freedom and Democracy (Volkspartij voor Vrijheid en Democratie), Member of the Bureau of the Alliance of Liberals and Democrats for Europe and sat on the European Parliament's Committee on the Environment, Public Health and Food Safety. He was a substitute for the Committee on Constitutional Affairs and the Committee on Economic and Monetary Affairs. He was also a member of the Delegation for relations with the countries of Southeast Asia and the Association of Southeast Asian Nations (ASEAN).

Jules Maaten was elected as a member of the European Parliament in the European Elections of 10 June 1999, on the list of the Dutch Liberal Party VVD and he joined the Liberal Group in the Parliament. He sat on the Committee for the Environment, Public Health and Consumer Affairs and, from 2002, on the Foreign Affairs Committee. During the first part of the legislature he sat on Economic and Monetary Committee. He has done legislative work on such issues as the Tobacco Directive, the introduction of the euro currency, water quality, AIDS, completion of the EU's internal market in alcohol products, international banking fees, the European Central Bank, safety of children's toys, car exhaust emissions, food safety, and genetically modified organisms and human genetics, homeopathic and pharmaceutical products, Dutch prisoners in Thailand.

Jules Maaten MEP was part of the parliamentary delegation maintaining relations with the ASEAN countries and Korea and of a number of parliamentary Inter-Groups including Population & Sustainable Development, and Animal Welfare. He has been active on EU foreign policy issues including human rights, shipments of nuclear material, East Timor, Burma, Cambodia, Indonesia, the International Criminal Court, death penalty and the war in Chechnya. In 1999 he was also elected board member of the European Liberal Democratic Party. Since the end of 2001 he has been leader of the VVD-group in the European Parliament. The VVD members elected him as leader of the VVD list for the European elections of June 2004.

Before his election as MEP Jules Maaten was Secretary General of the world union of liberal parties, the Liberal International, in London (1992–1999), during which time he was involved among others in supporting democratic movements in Asia, Latin America, Africa and Central and Eastern Europe. Prior to that (1986–1991) he was a municipal councillor in his hometown Amstelveen, near Amsterdam, where he dealt with public finance education and social affairs. As President of the World Union of Liberal IFLRY (1983–1989) he worked on issues of disarmament and east–west co-operation.

He began his political activities in 1979 as Personal Assistant of a Member of Parliament in the Netherlands (1979–1981), and as Member and Chairman of the European Youth Policy group of the Dutch International Youth Council, in which Dutch youth organisations discussed their views on the future of European unification. A year later Jules Maaten became national Board Member of the Dutch Young Liberals JOVD (1980–1984) and in 1981 joined the board of IFLRY. In 1982 he joined the executive committee of the Youth Forum of the European Communities in Brussels (a European-wide body of youth organisations), and he was on the staff of the Netherlands committee for the UN International Youth Year (1983–1985) where he dealt with such issues as unemployment and youth culture. From 1985 to 1989 he was a member of the executive committee of Liberal International. In 1987 he co-authored a book on Dutch liberalism, and he published numerous articles on political and international issues.

For a number of years he studied History and Law in Amsterdam. He lives in Berlin (Germany) and is married to Eva Horstmann; together they have a daughter Anna (2002).

== Career ==
- 1978-1979: History student (Vrije Universiteit Amsterdam)
- 1978-1979: Journalist, Amstelveens Nieuwsblad
- 1979-1981: Personal assistant, Tweede Kamer House of Representatives (Netherlands)
- 1979-1985: Foundation course in international law (University of Amsterdam)
- 1980-1984: International Officer, Dutch Young Liberals (Youth Organisation Freedom and Democracy JOVD) executive
- 1983-1986: Staff assistant, National Working Party on the UN International Youth Year, Amsterdam
- 1983-1989: Chairman of International Federation of Liberal Youth (IFLRY)
- 1985-1989: Member of executive of European Political Youth Council
- 1986-1991: Member of Amstelveen Municipal Council
- 1992-1999: Secretary-General, Liberal International, London
- 1999-2009: Member of the European Parliament in the liberal-democrat group (Alliance of Liberals and Democrats for Europe)
- 2009-2010: Independent consultant on good governance issues
- 2010-2016: Philippines Country Director for the Friedrich Naumann Foundation for Freedom (Manila)
- 2016-2020: Africa Regional Director for the Friedrich Naumann Foundation for Freedom (Johannesburg)
- 2020-2022: Head of International Regions of the Friedrich Naumann Foundation for Freedom (Potsdam)
- 2022-now: Regional Director of the European Dialogue (EU) project of the Friedrich Naumann Foundation for Freedom (Brussels)

== Decorations ==
- 1989: Member of the JOVD Order of Merit
- 2009: Knight of the Order of Orange-Nassau

== See also ==
- 2004 European Parliament election in the Netherlands
