= Els de Groen =

Dutch politician (1949–2025)

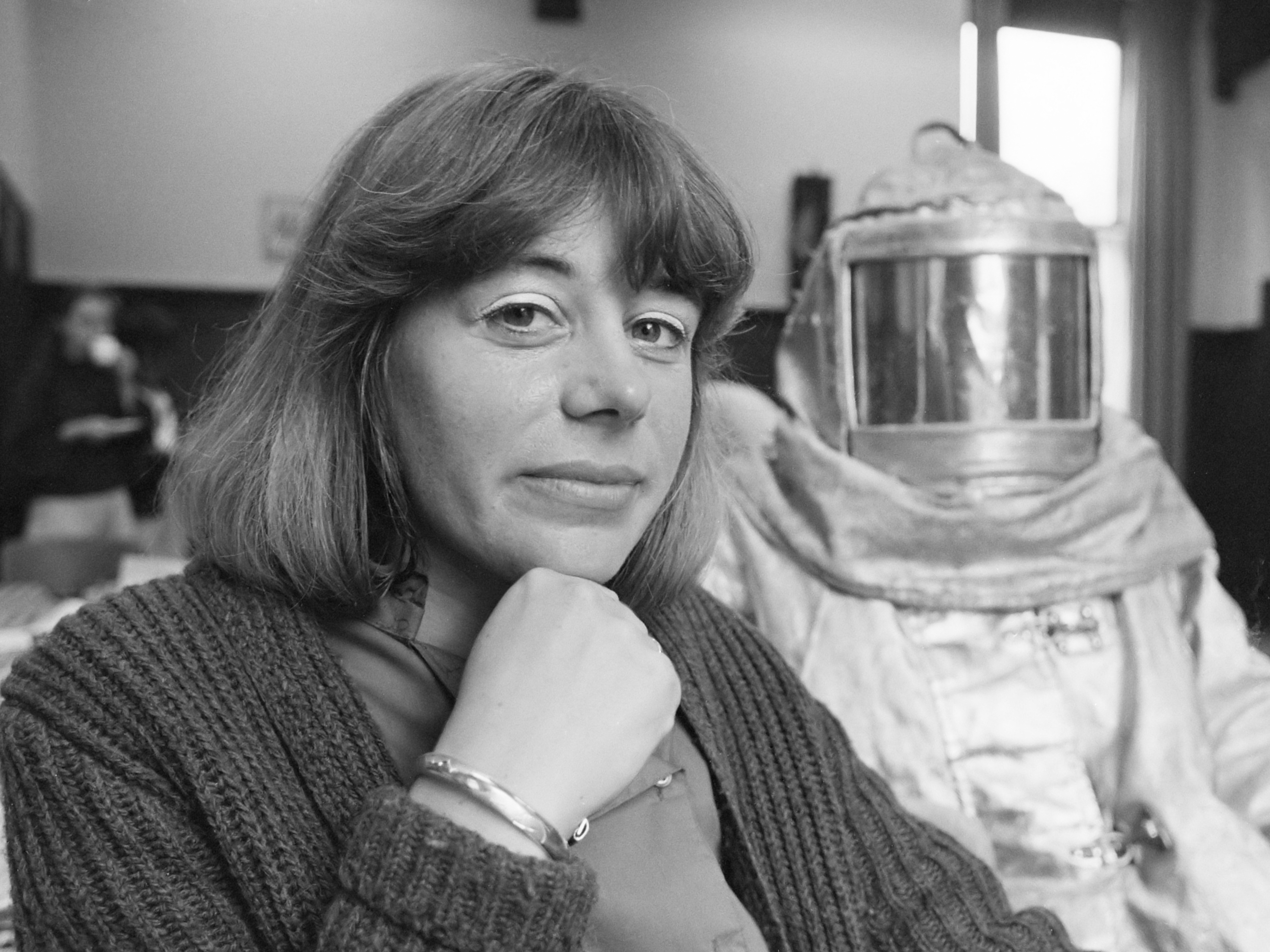
- De Groen in 1987

Member of the European Parliament for the Netherlands
- In office 2004–2009

Personal details
- Born: Elly Kouwenhoven; 23 December 1949 The Hague, Netherlands
- Died: 19 October 2025 (aged 75)
- Party: Europa Transparant; The Greens–European Free Alliance
- Profession: Journalist; writer; politician

Elly de Groen-Kouwenhoven (Dutch pronunciation: [ˈɛli də ɣruŋ ˈkʌuə(n)ˌɦoːvə(n)]; (Note: Groen in isolation: [ˈɣrun].) née Kouwenhoven; 23 December 1949 – 19 October 2025), generally known as Els de Groen, was a Dutch author and politician, who served as a Member of the European Parliament 2004–2009. She was a member of Europe Transparent, which sat with the Greens/EFA party group. As an MEP, she was a member of the Committee on Civil Liberties, Justice and Home Affairs and the Committee on Petitions, as well as a member of the delegation to the EU–Bulgaria Joint Parliamentary Committee and a substitute for the delegation for relations with the countries of Southeast Europe. De Groen died on 19 October 2025, at the age of 75.

== Career ==
- Senior secondary teaching certificate
- French teacher (1970–1975)
- Writer, essayist and commentator
- Literary reviewer, children's books (1985–1992)
- Editor of the Algemeen Dagblad's children's newspaper (1986–1989)
- Worked for 20 years on news magazines
- Author of various works of fiction and non-fiction for adults
- Her work over 20 years placed a strong emphasis on Eastern Europe
- Unpaid adviser to the Dutch foundation 'Roma-Emancipatie' in Oss (from 2002)
- Various literary awards
