= List of candidates in the 1999 European Parliament election in the Netherlands =

The 1999 European Parliament election for the election of the delegation from the Netherlands was held on 10 June 1999. This is the 5th time the elections have been held for the European elections in the Netherlands.

Sources for everything below:

== Numbering of the candidates list ==
The official order and names of candidate lists:

Candidate lists for the 1999 European Parliament election in the Netherlands
List		English translation	List name (Dutch)
1	list	CDA - European People's Party	CDA – Europese Volkspartij
2	list	P.v.d.A./European Social Democrats	P.v.d.A./Europese Sociaaldemocraten
3	list	VVD - European Liberal-Democrats	VVD – Europese Liberaal-Democraten
4	list	D66	
5	list	SGP, GPV and RPF	SGP, GPV en RPF
6	list	GREENLEFT	GROENLINKS
7	list	CD/Conservative Democrats	CD/Conservatieve Democraten
8	list	List Sala	Lijst Sala
9	list	European Electorate Platform Netherlands	Europees Verkiezers Platform Nederland
10	list	SP (Socialist Party)	SP (Socialistische Partij)
11	list	THE EUROPEAN PARTY	DE EUROPESE PARTIJ

== Candidate lists ==
=== CDA - European People's Party ===
Elected members are in bold

Number	Candidate	Sex	Preference vote	Photo
1	**Hanja Maij-Weggen**	Female	591,505	
2	**Wim van Velzen**	Male	103,743	
3	**Ria Oomen-Ruijten**	Female	99,584	
4	**Albert Jan Maat**	Male	34,622	
5	**Karla Peijs**	Female	11,975	
6	**Bert Doorn**	Male	3,598	
7	**Arie Oostlander**	Male	17,628	
8	**Bartho Pronk**	Male	7,929	
9	Peter Pex	Male	8,380	
10	**Maria Martens**	Female	16,254	
11	Cees Bremmer	Male	2,956	
12	Bart van Winsen	Male	9,527	
13	Birgit van Dongen-Svensgaard	Female	3,047	
14	Nihat Eski	Male	7,505	
15	Ciel Meewis	Female	2,566	
16	Cornelis Visser	Male	8,858	
17	Hillie van de Streek	Female	1,086	
18	Jacob Wiersma	Male	2,480	
19	Jan Koster	Male	975	
20	Chantal Hector	Female	485	
21	Albert Schouten	Male	1,439	
22	Ellen Timmers-van Moorsel	Female	994	
23	Bearn Bilker	Male	2,650	
24	Irene Drexhage-Zijlstra	Female	1,038	
25	Hein Pieper	Male	1,400	
26	Willem Peek	Male	3,912	
27	Rick Matser	Male	742	
28	Huub Verhoeven	Male	1,717	
29	Gerardus ten Thij	Male	2,372	
30	Jan Simons	Male	3,931	
Total:			954,898	

=== P.v.d.A./European Social Democrats ===
Elected members are in bold

Number	Candidate	Sex	Preference vote	Photo
1	**Max van den Berg**	Male	584,167	
2	**Ieke van den Burg**	Female	55,016	
3	**Jan Marinus Wiersma**	Male	9,753	
4	**Joke Swiebel**	Female	12,554	
5	**Michiel van Hulten**	Male	5,710	
6	**Dorette Corbey**	Female	4,898	
7	Alman Metten	Male	4,542	
8	Josephine Verspaget	Female	7,988	
9	Hugo Fernandez Mendes	Male	6,381	
10	Jan Cremers	Male	4,752	
11	Henny Helmich	Male	995	
12	Kees Marges	Male	1,031	
13	Jenny IJtsma	Female	1,191	
14	Alvaro Pinto Scholtbach	Male	1,135	
15	Lo Breemer	Male	1,072	
16	Ria Meijvogel	Female	2,504	
17	Joost de Jong	Male	2,119	
18	Emine Bozkurt	Female	7,121	
Total:			712,929	

=== VVD - European Liberal-Democrats ===
Elected members are in bold

Number	Candidate	Sex	Preference vote	Photo
1	**Jan-Kees Wiebenga**	Male	535,904	
2	**Elly Plooij-van Gorsel**	Female	45,855	
3	**Jan Mulder**	Male	13,825	
4	**Jules Maaten**	Male	4,341	
5	**Marieke Sanders**	Female	11,670	
6	Robert Goedbloed	Male	6,860	
7	Klaas Groenveld	Male	4,620	
8	Herman Vermeer	Male	6,535	
9	Roland van Benthem	Male	5,649	
10	Ria Tamis	Female	4,594	
11	Wytze Russchen	Male	4,040	
12	Raymond van der Meer	Male	1,698	
13	Ineke van Ark-Hessing	Female	2,512	
14	Albert Holtland	Male	1,338	
15	Mark Onur	Male	1,575	
16	Ted Versteegh-Weijers	Female	5,048	
17	Rinus van Greuningen	Male	688	
18	Mark Boumans	Male	2,265	
19	Giel Dubbeld	Male	1,706	
20	Dennis Straat	Male	2,410	
21	**Toine Manders**	Male	14,237	
22	Peter Sijmons	Male	1,677	
23	Leo de Kok	Male	1,840	
24	Stan Lyczak	Male	1,224	
25	Jan Pieter Vos	Male	3,787	
26	Hans-Peter Schoonenberg	Male	960	
27	Titia van Blommestein-Buttinger	Female	5,083	
28	Florus Wijsenbeek	Male	6,109	
Total:			698,050	

=== D66 ===
Elected members are in bold

Number	Candidate	Sex	Preference vote	Photo
1	**Lousewies van der Laan**	Female	143,009	
2	**Bob van den Bos**	Male	8,712	
3	Johanna Boogerd-Quaak	Female	10,992	
4	Floor Kist	Male	5,244	
5	Sophie in ’t Veld	Female	2,838	
6	Ien Peijnenburg-van der Pol	Female	3,809	
7	Bert Kamphuis	Male	2,972	
8	Marijn de Koning	Female	4,755	
9	Tom Stroobach	Male	690	
10	Erica Jaspers	Female	1,328	
11	Hans Roos	Male	733	
12	Joan van Rijswijk	Female	600	
13	Ralph de Vries	Male	750	
14	Jan Flameling	Male	5,974	
15	Gaitrie Bharos	Female	8,936	
16	Henk Roelofs	Male	898	
17	Laurens Bonnema	Male	834	
18	Wim Ritsema	Male	387	
19	Robbert Vegter	Male	384	
20	Jaap van den Donker	Male	324	
21	Brian Eley	Male	1,454	
Total:			205,623	

=== SGP, GPV and RPF ===
Elected members are in bold

Number	Candidate	Sex	Preference vote	Photo
1	**Hans Blokland**	Male	245,214	
2	**Rijk van Dam**	Male	10,630	
3	**Bas Belder**	Male	20,491	
4	Peter van Dalen	Male	1,436	
5	C.S.L. Janse		1,473	
6	H. van Dijk		3,542	
7	W. Nuis		1,587	
8	Gerrit Holdijk		1,340	
9	L. Bezemer		1,042	
10	W. van Grootheest		490	
11	J.J. Verboom		643	
12	I.G. Mostert		729	
13	J. Pleijsier		354	
14	A.P. de Jong		630	
15	F. Godschalk		422	
16	A.B.F. Hoek-van Kooten		9,382	
17	Roelof Bisschop		847	
18	R. Janssens		324	
19	Roel Kuiper		370	
20	H.G. Leertouwer		521	
21	M.A. Niemeijer		256	
22	J.H. ten Hove		759	
23	W.B. Kranendonk		161	
24	J.L. de Vries		426	
25	A.W. Biersteker		354	
26	W. Fieret		517	
27	S. de Vries		609	
28	Meindert Leerling		2,966	
29	A. de Boer		511	
30	Kars Veling		1,586	
Total:			309,612	

=== GreenLeft ===
Elected members are in bold

Number	Candidate	Sex	Preference vote	Photo
1	**Joost Lagendijk**	Male	245,642	
2	**Kathalijne Buitenweg**	Female	90,549	
3	**Alexander de Roo**	Male	4,343	
4	**Theo Bouwman**	Male	6,012	
5	Titia van Leeuwen	Female	9,093	
6	Jan Juffermans	Male	5,430	
7	Hein Verkerk	Male	1,519	
8	Aletta van der Stap	Female	6,794	
9	Nesrin Cingöz	Female	8,711	
10	Richard Wouters	Male	854	
11	Ans Zwerver	Female	2,822	
12	Jan Muijtjens	Male	3,465	
13	Ben Crum	Male	624	
14	Wies Dulfer	Female	1,895	
15	Antionette Fonville	Female	2,214	
16	Karien Kienhuis-Smits	Female	2,293	
17	Andre Bos	Male	519	
18	Bart Kuiper	Male	1,124	
19	Karin Spaink	Female	5,051	
20	Bas de Gaay Fortman	Male	8,603	
21	Lydia Rood	Female	4,099	
22	Radi Suudi	Male	1,097	
23	Jan Oosterwijk	Male	534	
24	Nel van Dijk	Female	6,582	
Total:			419,869	

=== CD/Conservative Democrats ===
Number	Candidate	Sex	Preference vote	Photo
1	Chiel Koning	Male	7799	
2	Hans Janmaat	Male	6,611	
3	J.A. Gilles	Male	227	
4	G.F. Rieff	Male	234	
5	W. Elsthout	Male	225	
6	P. van der Pol	Female	215	
7	Wil Schuurman	Female	300	
8	P.G. Zillen	Male	277	
9	A.A.J. Poppe	Male	250	
10	J. Stoops	Male	71	
11	R. Schuurman	Male	119	
12	H.G.T. Selhorst	Male	149	
13	A.B. de Jong	Male	179	
14	D.A. Meijer	Male	96	
15	J.L. de Graaff	Male	90	
16	J.M. van Herwijnen	Male	162	
17	J. van den Broek	Female	117	
18	A. Bierhuizen	Male	102	
19	C. van Vale	Male	139	
20	W.G.M.T. van Ginneke	Male	66	
21	J.J. Moll	Male	43	
22	C.J. van Gils	Male	45	
23	J.C. van der Kooi	Male	224	
Total:			17,740	

=== List Sala ===
Number	Candidate	Sex	Preference vote	Photo
1	Luc Sala	Male	10,580	
Total:			10,580	

=== European Electorate Platform Netherlands ===
Number	Candidate	Sex	Preference vote	Photo
1	Jim Janssen van Raaij		7,766	
2	R.S. Hamelers		1,443	
3	M.J. van den Acker		458	
4	C. Raaphorst-de Groot		374	
5	C.H. Abrahams-Devid		227	
6	E.C.C. Lathouwers		101	
7	J.D.C. Strijk		411	
8	E. Bal-Anthonissen		81	
9	W.J. ter Kulve-van Os		199	
10	J.M. Spätgens		356	
11	A. van Maanen		79	
12	R.A. Kraft		110	
13	J. Harte		112	
14	J.E. van Leeuwen-Veldhuizen		137	
15	T. Jansen		111	
16	J. Kollaard		66	
17	D.J. Zeefuik		115	
18	A. Dubbeldam		92	
19	J.P.E.M. Hageman		334	
20	B.G.L. Wild		56	
21	R.G.J. Reker		124	
22	A.J. Kortekaas		126	
23	J.G.M. ten Oever		139	
24	W.R. Meijer		217	
Total:			13,234	

=== SP (Socialist Party) ===
Candidates for the European Parliament from the SP
SP candidates 1989	(1989)
SP candidates 1994	(1994)
SP candidates 1999	(1999)
SP candidates 2004	(2004)
SP candidates 2009	(2009)
SP candidates 2014	(2014)
SP candidates 2019	(2019)
SP candidates 2024	(2024)

Elected members are in bold

Number	Candidate	Sex	Preference vote	Photo
1	**Erik Meijer**	Male	124,800	
2	Peter van Zutphen		8,051	
3	Jeanette de Jong		14,682	
4	Hans van Hooft Sr.		2,671	
5	Paulus Jansen		1,531	
6	Havva Çinar		1,708	
7	Nico Schouten		2,410	
8	Johan van den Hout		1,416	
9	Marian Beldsnijder		1,663	
10	Edith Kuitert		1,127	
11	Peter Verschuren		1,764	
12	Emile Roemer	Male	870	
13	René Roovers		959	
14	Arda Gerkens		1,294	
15	Tonnie Wouters		1,003	
16	Peter de Jonge		739	
17	Aaltjo Kerbof		297	
18	Willemieke Arts		1,554	
19	Gijs Stavinga		828	
20	Riet de Wit-Romans		999	
21	Hilde van der Molen		443	
22	Ronald Boorsma		701	
23	Tiny Kox	Male	1,111	
24	Jef Kleijnen		625	
25	Gerda Verwoort		536	
26	Helga Hijmans		434	
27	Marijke Folmer		578	
28	Mieke van de Weijer-van den Berg		723	
29	Philip Oosterlaak		388	
30	Romy van Zeeland		2,737	
Total:			178,642	

=== The European Party ===
Number	Candidate	Sex	Preference vote	Photo
1	Roel Nieuwenkamp		15,070	
2	Kees Nieuwenkamp		1,240	
3	Gerben Dijkstra		952	
4	Tonnis Poppema		427	
5	Stoffel Dewil		194	
6	Percy van Woerkom		197	
7	Corine Selders		993	
8	Mark Jans		200	
9	Henk Stuurman		222	
10	Paul Visser		204	
11	Arnaud van Oers		390	
12	Lotje Meijknecht		340	
13	Peter Pol		119	
14	Roger Sutmuller		105	
15	Monica Beek		188	
16	Casper Barendse		225	
17	Ingrid Meier		269	
18	Gerrit Jan Tap		233	
19	Clemens Braams		100	
20	Sebastian Couturier		123	
21	Jacques van Rensen		202	
22	Steven Zaat		191	
23	Anouk Terstegen		1,047	
Total:			23,231	
