= Bochum I =

Federal electoral district of Germany

139 Bochum I
- Electoral district for the Bundestag
- Bochum I in 2025
- State: North Rhine-Westphalia
- Population: 277,700 (2019)
- Electorate: 202,393 (2021)
- Major settlements: Bochum (partial)
- Area: 103.3 km^{2}

Current electoral district
- Created: 1949
- Party: SPD
- Member: Serdar Yüksel
- Elected: 2025

Bochum I is an electoral constituency (German: Wahlkreis) represented in the Bundestag. It elects one member via first-past-the-post voting. Under the current constituency numbering system, it is designated as constituency 139. It is located in the Ruhr region of North Rhine-Westphalia, comprising the western and central part of the city of Bochum.

Bochum I was created for the inaugural 1949 federal election. From 2002 to 2025, it was represented by Axel Schäfer of the Social Democratic Party (SPD). Since 2025 it has been represented by Serdar Yüksel of the SPD.

== Geography ==
Bochum I is located in the Ruhr region of North Rhine-Westphalia. As of the 2021 federal election, it comprises the city districts (Stadtbezirke) of 1 Bochum-Mitte, 2 Bochum-Wattenscheid, 5 Bochum-Süd, and 6 Bochum-Südwest from the independent city of Bochum.

== History ==
Bochum I was created in 1949, then known as Bochum. It acquired its current name in the 1980 election. In the 1949 election, it was North Rhine-Westphalia constituency 59 in the numbering system. From 1953 through 1961, it was number 118. From 1965 through 1976, it was number 117. From 1980 through 1998, it was number 110. From 2002 through 2009, it was number 141. In the 2013 through 2021 elections, it was number 140. From the 2025 election, it has been number 139.

Originally, the constituency was coterminous with the independent city of Bochum. From 1965 through 1976, it comprised western parts of Bochum. From 1980 through 1998, it comprised the 1 Bochum-Mitte, 2 Bochum-Wattenscheid, and 6 Bochum-Südwest Stadtbezirke from Bochum. It acquired its current borders in the 2002 election.

Election	No.	Name	Borders
1949	59	Bochum	Bochum city
1953	118	Bochum	Bochum city
1957	118	Bochum	Bochum city
1961	118	Bochum	Bochum city
1965	117	Bochum	Bochum city (only western parts)
1969	117	Bochum	Bochum city (only western parts)
1972	117	Bochum	Bochum city (only western parts)
1976	117	Bochum	Bochum city (only western parts)
1980	110	Bochum I	Bochum city (only 1 Bochum-Mitte, 2 Bochum-Wattenscheid, and 6 Bochum-Südwest Stadtbezirke)
1983	110	Bochum I	Bochum city (only 1 Bochum-Mitte, 2 Bochum-Wattenscheid, and 6 Bochum-Südwest Stadtbezirke)
1987	110	Bochum I	Bochum city (only 1 Bochum-Mitte, 2 Bochum-Wattenscheid, and 6 Bochum-Südwest Stadtbezirke)
1990	110	Bochum I	Bochum city (only 1 Bochum-Mitte, 2 Bochum-Wattenscheid, and 6 Bochum-Südwest Stadtbezirke)
1994	110	Bochum I	Bochum city (only 1 Bochum-Mitte, 2 Bochum-Wattenscheid, and 6 Bochum-Südwest Stadtbezirke)
1998	110	Bochum I	Bochum city (only 1 Bochum-Mitte, 2 Bochum-Wattenscheid, and 6 Bochum-Südwest Stadtbezirke)
2002	141	Bochum I	Bochum city (only 1 Bochum-Mitte, 2 Bochum-Wattenscheid, 5 Bochum-Süd, and 6 Bochum-Südwest Stadtbezirke)
2005	141	Bochum I	Bochum city (only 1 Bochum-Mitte, 2 Bochum-Wattenscheid, 5 Bochum-Süd, and 6 Bochum-Südwest Stadtbezirke)
2009	141	Bochum I	Bochum city (only 1 Bochum-Mitte, 2 Bochum-Wattenscheid, 5 Bochum-Süd, and 6 Bochum-Südwest Stadtbezirke)
2013	140	Bochum I	Bochum city (only 1 Bochum-Mitte, 2 Bochum-Wattenscheid, 5 Bochum-Süd, and 6 Bochum-Südwest Stadtbezirke)
2017	140	Bochum I	Bochum city (only 1 Bochum-Mitte, 2 Bochum-Wattenscheid, 5 Bochum-Süd, and 6 Bochum-Südwest Stadtbezirke)
2021	140	Bochum I	Bochum city (only 1 Bochum-Mitte, 2 Bochum-Wattenscheid, 5 Bochum-Süd, and 6 Bochum-Südwest Stadtbezirke)
2025	139	Bochum I	Bochum city (only 1 Bochum-Mitte, 2 Bochum-Wattenscheid, 5 Bochum-Süd, and 6 Bochum-Südwest Stadtbezirke)

== Members ==
The constituency has been held by the Social Democratic Party (SPD) during all but two Bundestag terms since its creation. It was first represented by Erich Ollenhauer of the SPD 1949 until 1953, when it was won by Franzjosef Müser of the Christian Democratic Union (CDU) for two terms. Heinrich Deist regained it for the SPD in 1961 and served a single term. Karl Liedtke was elected in 1965 and served until 1987. He was succeeded by Klaus Hasenfratz, who was then representative until 2002. Axel Schäfer was elected in 2002 and re-elected in 2005, 2009, 2013, 2017, and 2021. Schäfer was succeedeed by Serdar Yüksel in 2025.

Election	Member	Party	%
1949	Erich Ollenhauer	SPD	39.1
1953	Franzjosef Müser	CDU	45.0
1957	Franzjosef Müser	CDU	47.2
1961	Heinrich Deist	SPD	50.6
1965	Karl Liedtke	SPD	55.2
1969	Karl Liedtke	SPD	59.1
1972	Karl Liedtke	SPD	64.0
1976	Karl Liedtke	SPD	59.4
1980	Karl Liedtke	SPD	59.9
1983	Karl Liedtke	SPD	56.7
1987	Klaus Hasenfratz	SPD	56.8
1990	Klaus Hasenfratz	SPD	54.5
1994	Klaus Hasenfratz	SPD	55.7
1998	Klaus Hasenfratz	SPD	60.7
2002	Axel Schäfer	SPD	57.0
2005	Axel Schäfer	SPD	55.7
2009	Axel Schäfer	SPD	43.3
2013	Axel Schäfer	SPD	44.2
2017	Axel Schäfer	SPD	37.2
2021	Axel Schäfer	SPD	38.3
2025	Serdar Yüksel	SPD	32.7

== Election results ==
=== 2025 election ===
Federal election (2025): Bochum I
Notes:	Blue background denotes the winner of the electorate vote. Pink background denotes a candidate elected from their party list. Yellow background denotes an electorate win by a list member, or other incumbent. A ✓ or ✗ denotes status of any incumbent, win or lose respectively.						
Party	Candidate	Votes	%	±%	Party votes	%	±%
SPD	Serdar Yüksel	53,007	32.7	▼5.6	39,363	24.2	▼8.5
CDU	Vivienne Roth	39,934	24.6	▲3.0	38,267	23.5	▲4.1
AfD	Knuth Meyer-Soltau	22,797	14.1		22,483	13.8	▲7.2
Greens	Max Lucks	22,181	13.7	▼4.9	24,224	14.9	▼5.2
Left	Cansin Köktürk	15,274	9.4	▲3.3	19,652	12.2	▲6.7
BSW					6,344	3.9	
FDP	Leon Beck	4,681	2.9	▼6.1	5,942	3.7	▼5.8
PARTEI	Lena Bormann	2,795	1.7	▼1.4	1,078	0.7	▼0.6
Tierschutzpartei					2,158	1.3	0.0
Volt					1,172	0.7	▲0.4
BD	Nicole Scheer	1,050	0.6		353	0.2	
FW					477	0.3	▼0.1
MLPD	Anna Schmit	419	0.3	▼0.1	132	0.1	0.0
Team Todenhöfer					339	0.2	▼0.6
PdF					269	0.2	▲0.1
dieBasis				▼2.5	251	0.2	▼0.6
MERA25					72	0.0	
Values					67	0.0	
Humanists				▼0.3			▼0.1
Pirates							▼0.3
Gesundheitsforschung							▼0.1
ÖDP							▼0.1
Bündnis C							▼0.1
SGP							0.0
Informal votes		1,377			872		
Total valid votes		162,138			162,643		
Turnout		163,515	81.7	▲5.3			
SPD hold	Majority	13,073	8.1				

=== 2021 election ===
Federal election (2021): Bochum I
Notes:	Blue background denotes the winner of the electorate vote. Pink background denotes a candidate elected from their party list. Yellow background denotes an electorate win by a list member, or other incumbent. A ✓ or ✗ denotes status of any incumbent, win or lose respectively.						
Party	Candidate	Votes	%	±%	Party votes	%	±%
SPD	✓ Axel Schäfer	58,235	38.3	▲1.1	50,162	32.7	▲3.0
CDU	Fabian Schütz	32,962	21.7	▼6.6	29,811	19.4	▼6.0
Greens	Max Lucks	28,288	18.6	▲10.9	30,795	20.1	▲11.1
FDP	Olaf in der Beek	13,657	9.0	▲1.9	14,583	9.5	▼1.7
AfD					10,232	6.7	▼3.1
Left	Sevim Dağdelen	9,361	6.2	▼3.8	8,225	5.4	▼4.9
Tierschutzpartei					2,079	1.4	▲0.4
PARTEI	Lena Bormann	4,700	3.1		1,914	1.2	0.0
Team Todenhöfer					1,303	0.8	
dieBasis	Andreas Triebel	3,846	2.5		1,222	0.8	
FW					636	0.4	▲0.2
Pirates					531	0.3	▼0.1
Volt					519	0.3	
NPD					205	0.1	▼0.1
Gesundheitsforschung					195	0.1	0.0
MLPD	Anna Vöhringer	530	0.3	0.0	100	0.1	0.0
Humanists	Yan Ugodnikov	488	0.3		189	0.1	0.0
LIEBE					177	0.1	
ÖDP					135	0.1	0.0
LfK					126	0.1	
V-Partei3					121	0.1	▼0.1
Bündnis C					90	0.1	
du.					82	0.1	
DKP					59	0.0	0.0
LKR					46	0.0	
PdF					39	0.0	
SGP					12	0.0	0.0
Informal votes		2,624			1,103		
Total valid votes		152,067			153,588		
Turnout		154,691	76.4	▲0.4			
SPD hold	Majority	25,273	16.6	▲7.7			

=== 2017 election ===
Federal election (2017): Bochum I
Notes:	Blue background denotes the winner of the electorate vote. Pink background denotes a candidate elected from their party list. Yellow background denotes an electorate win by a list member, or other incumbent. A ✓ or ✗ denotes status of any incumbent, win or lose respectively.						
Party	Candidate	Votes	%	±%	Party votes	%	±%
SPD	✓ Axel Schäfer	57,655	37.2	▼7.0	46,243	29.7	▼8.9
CDU	Christian Haardt	43,773	28.2	▼7.4	39,580	25.4	▼5.1
Left	Sevim Dağdelen	15,462	10.0	▲3.1	15,953	10.2	▲2.3
AfD	Wolf-Dieter Liese	14,775	9.5		15,190	9.8	▲5.9
Greens	Frithjof Schmidt	11,937	7.7	▲0.9	13,862	8.9	▼0.7
FDP	Olaf in der Beek	10,923	7.0	▲5.7	17,449	11.2	▲7.4
PARTEI					1,924	1.2	▲0.8
Tierschutzpartei					1,418	0.9	
AD-DEMOKRATEN					904	0.6	
Pirates					765	0.5	▼2.1
NPD					408	0.3	▼0.0
FW					302	0.2	0.0
DiB					270	0.2	
BGE					219	0.1	
V-Partei³					217	0.1	
ÖDP					180	0.1	0.0
MLPD	Klaus Leymann	492	0.3	▲0.1	167	0.1	0.0
Gesundheitsforschung					158	0.1	
DM					155	0.1	
Die Humanisten					143	0.1	
Volksabstimmung					138	0.1	▼0.1
DKP					45	0.0	
SGP					14	0.0	0.0
Informal votes		1,924			1,237		
Total valid votes		155,017			155,704		
Turnout		156,941	76.0	▲3.0			
SPD hold	Majority	13,882	9.0	▲0.4			

=== 2013 election ===
Federal election (2013): Bochum I
Notes:	Blue background denotes the winner of the electorate vote. Pink background denotes a candidate elected from their party list. Yellow background denotes an electorate win by a list member, or other incumbent. A ✓ or ✗ denotes status of any incumbent, win or lose respectively.						
Party	Candidate	Votes	%	±%	Party votes	%	±%
SPD	✓ Axel Schäfer	66,851	44.2	▲0.9	58,766	38.6	▲2.3
CDU	Norbert Lammert	53,861	35.6	▲4.7	46,448	30.5	▲5.7
Left	Sevim Dağdelen	10,331	6.8	▼2.9	12,022	7.9	▼2.9
Greens	Frithjof Schmidt	10,323	6.8	▼1.6	14,667	9.6	▼2.2
AfD					5,820	3.8	
Pirates	Christina Worm	4,608	3.0		3,903	2.6	▲0.6
NPD	Claus Cremer	2,832	1.9	▼0.4	1,916	1.3	▼0.1
FDP	Dennis Rademacher	2,069	1.4	▼4.3	5,862	3.9	▼6.9
PARTEI					678	0.4	
PRO					374	0.2	
FW					286	0.2	
Volksabstimmung					245	0.2	▲0.1
ÖDP					237	0.2	▲0.1
BIG					196	0.1	
Nichtwahler					187	0.1	
REP					170	0.1	▼0.1
MLPD	Vesna Buljevic	290	0.2	0.0	145	0.1	0.0
Party of Reason					71	0.1	
RRP					69	0.0	▼0.1
Die Rechte					48	0.0	
BüSo					36	0.0	0.0
PSG					36	0.0	0.0
Informal votes		2,865			1,848		
Total valid votes		151,165			152,182		
Turnout		154,030	73.0	▲1.3			
SPD hold	Majority	12,990	8.6	▼3.8			

=== 2009 election ===
Federal election (2009): Bochum I
Notes:	Blue background denotes the winner of the electorate vote. Pink background denotes a candidate elected from their party list. Yellow background denotes an electorate win by a list member, or other incumbent. A ✓ or ✗ denotes status of any incumbent, win or lose respectively.						
Party	Candidate	Votes	%	±%	Party votes	%	±%
SPD	✓ Axel Schäfer	65,810	43.3	▼12.3	55,224	36.3	▼12.9
CDU	Norbert Lammert	47,030	31.0	▲1.0	37,763	24.8	▼0.4
Left	Sevim Dağdelen	14,741	9.7	▲4.1	16,442	10.8	▲3.8
Greens	Frithjof Schmidt	12,775	8.4	▲3.3	18,094	11.9	▲2.6
FDP	Markus Selzener	8,578	5.6	▲3.3	16,390	10.8	▲4.1
Pirates					2,943	1.9	
NPD	Claus Cremer	2,268	1.5	▲0.4	1,796	1.2	▲0.3
Tierschutzpartei					1,171	0.8	▲0.2
FAMILIE					608	0.4	0.0
RENTNER					538	0.4	
REP					360	0.2	0.0
RRP					214	0.1	
MLPD	Annegret Gärtner-Leymann	259	0.2	0.0	126	0.1	0.0
Volksabstimmung					126	0.1	0.0
ÖDP					119	0.1	
DVU					101	0.1	
BüSo	Stephan Hochstein	486	0.3		100	0.1	0.0
Centre					57	0.0	0.0
PSG					49	0.0	0.0
Informal votes		1,853			1,579		
Total valid votes		151,947			152,221		
Turnout		153,800	71.7	▼7.7			
SPD hold	Majority	18,780	12.3	▼13.3			

=== 2005 election ===
Federal election (2005): Bochum I
Notes:	Blue background denotes the winner of the electorate vote. Pink background denotes a candidate elected from their party list. Yellow background denotes an electorate win by a list member, or other incumbent. A ✓ or ✗ denotes status of any incumbent, win or lose respectively.						
Party	Candidate	Votes	%	±%	Party votes	%	±%
SPD	✓ Axel Schäfer	94,985	55.7	▼1.3	83,998	49.2	▼2.8
CDU	Norbert Lammert	51,120	30.0	▲1.6	42,992	25.2	▼2.8
Left	Lena Orlowski	9,497	5.6	▲3.9	11,873	7.0	▲5.1
Greens	Barbara Jung	8,786	5.1	▼1.8	15,809	9.3	▼1.5
FDP	Felix Haltt	4,071	2.4	▼2.4	11,304	6.6	▼0.6
NPD	Claus Cremer	1,883	1.1		1,548	0.9	▲0.6
Tierschutzpartei					937	0.5	0.0
GRAUEN					633	0.4	▲0.1
Familie					614	0.4	▲0.2
REP					400	0.2	▼0.1
MLPD	Anne Fuchs	316	0.2		204	0.1	
From Now on... Democracy Through Referendum					153	0.1	
PBC					124	0.1	
BüSo					62	0.0	
Centre					31	0.0	
Socialist Equality Party					49	0.0	
Informal votes		2,315			2,227		
Total valid votes		170,658			170,746		
Turnout		172,973	79.4	▼1.7			
SPD hold	Majority	43,865	25.7				
