= List of People's Party for Freedom and Democracy members of the European Parliament =

This is a list of all (former) Members of the European Parliament for the People's Party for Freedom and Democracy (VVD).

== List ==
Name	Start of term	End of term	Ref.
Malik Azmani	2 July 2019		
Hans van Baalen	14 July 2009	2 July 2019	
Jan Baas	16 September 1963	17 July 1979	
Jeannette Baljeu	16 July 2024		
Cees Berkhouwer	16 September 1963	12 July 1979	
Cees Berkhouwer	17 July 1979	24 July 1984	
Anouk van Brug	16 July 2024		
Frederik Gerard van Dijk	22 June 1959	4 September 1963	
Aart Geurtsen	17 July 1979	24 July 1984	
Robert Jan Goedbloed	30 September 1998	20 July 1999	
Bart Groothuis	12 February 2020		
Jeanine Hennis-Plasschaert	20 July 2004	17 June 2010	
Jan Huitema	1 July 2014	16 July 2024	
Henk Korthals	10 September 1952	1 January 1958	
Henk Korthals	1 January 1958	19 May 1959	
Jessica Larive	24 July 1984	20 July 1999	
Hendrik Jan Louwes	17 July 1979	24 July 1989	
Jules Maaten	20 July 1999	14 July 2009	
Toine Manders	20 July 1999	17 October 2013 (Note: Served the rest of his term as an independent)	
Jan Mulder	19 July 1994	14 July 2009	
Jan Mulder	22 June 2010	1 July 2014	
Caroline Nagtegaal	14 November 2017	16 July 2024	
Cora van Nieuwenhuizen	1 July 2014	26 October 2017	
Hans Nord	17 July 1979	24 July 1989	
Elly Plooij-van Gorsel	19 July 1994	20 July 2004	
Catharina Rinzema	18 January 2022	16 July 2024	
Marieke Sanders-ten Holte	20 July 1999	20 July 2004	
Jo Schouwenaar-Franssen	16 January 1961	24 July 1963	
Liesje Schreinemacher	2 July 2019	10 January 2022	
Herman Vermeer	12 November 2001	20 July 2004	
Gijs de Vries	24 July 1984	3 August 1998	
Jan-Kees Wiebenga	19 July 1994	8 October 2001	
Florus Wijsenbeek	24 July 1984	20 July 1999	
Bob de Wilde	14 May 1959	20 December 1960	
