= List of candidates in the 1994 European Parliament election in the Netherlands =

The 1994 European Parliament election for the election of the delegation from the Netherlands was held on 9 June 1994. This is the 4th time the elections have been held for the European elections in the Netherlands.

== Numbering of the candidates list ==
The official order and names of candidate lists:

Candidate lists for the 1994 European Parliament election in the Netherlands
List		English translation	List name (Dutch)
1	list	CDA - European People's Party	CDA – Europese Volkspartij
2	list	P.v.d.A./European Social Democrats	P.v.d.A./Europese Sociaaldemocraten
3	list	VVD/European Liberal-Democrats	VVD/Europese Liberaal-Democraten
4	list	D66	
5	list	SGP, GPV and RPF	SGP, GPV en RPF
6	list	A Better Future...	Een Betere Toekomst...
7	list	SP (Socialist Party)	SP (Socialistische Partij)
8	list	The Greens	De Groenen
9	list	List De Groen	Lijst De Groen
10	list	CD	
11	list	GREENLEFT	GROENLINKS

== CDA - European People's Party ==
Candidate list for the Christian Democratic Appeal (CDA)
Number	Candidate	Votes	Result
1	Hanja Maij-Weggen	963,751	Elected
2	Wim van Velzen	82,158	Elected
3	Pam Cornelissen	28,809	Elected
4	Jan Sonneveld	16,528	Elected
5	Ria Oomen-Ruijten	82,472	Elected
6	Karla Peijs	4,391	Elected
7	Jim Janssen van Raay	15,944	Elected
8	Arie Oostlander	25,566	Elected
9	Bartho Pronk	8,973	Elected
10	Peter Pex	1,872	Elected
11	L. Doorn	1,002	
12	P.J.M. Thomeer	2,334	
13	J.J. Bouw	829	
14	A.J. Maat	1,727	
15	E.M.H. Joosten	1,339	
16	Jan Peter Balkenende	921	
17	E.J.W. van Rij	365	
18	J.G.W. Simons	597	
19	P.M.M. van Ostaijen	442	
20	E. Wermuth	536	
21	G.L.O. baron van Boetzelaer	10,674	
22	W.H.M. Aalbers	758	
23	D.A.M. Akkermans	2,029	
24	D.H.A. van Hemmen	977	
25	J.H. Ketel	345	
26	D.R. van Ee	1,173	
27	W. Waterreus	546	
28	B. van der Kolk	757	
29	J.M. Groffen	462	
30	A.H.W. Hazenkamp	4,927	
Total		1,263,204	

== P.v.d.A./European Social Democrats ==
Candidate list for the Labour Party (PvdA)
Number	Candidate	Votes	Result
1	Hedy d'Ancona	754,536	Elected
2	Frits Castricum	23,848	Elected
3	Piet Dankert	111,304	Elected
4	Leonie van Bladel	10,628	Elected
5	Wim van Velzen	3,330	Elected
6	Maartje van Putten	8,608	Elected
7	Jan Marinus Wiersma	2,279	Elected
8	Alman Metten	1,456	Elected
9	Michiel van Hulten	2,475	
10	Mathilde van den Brink	3,466	
11	Joke Kniesmeijer	1,904	
12	Myriam Bergervoet	1,078	
13	Hylke Tromp	8,371	
14	Fred Andrioli	836	
15	Annemarie Goedmakers	5,248	
Total		939,367	

== VVD/European Liberal-Democrats ==
Candidate list for the VVD
Number	Candidate	Votes	Result
1	Gijs de Vries	565,606	Elected
2	Jan-Kees Wiebenga	39,444	Elected
3	Jessica Larive	64,521	Elected
4	Jan Mulder	8,461	Elected
5	Florus Wijsenbeek	5,340	Elected
6	Elly Plooij-van Gorsel	7,221	Elected
7	Robert Jan Goedbloed	3,411	Replacement
8	Jan Muntinga	3,723	
9	M. van Greuningen	746	
10	Ad Schouwenaars	3,900	
11	Elisabeth Brandenburg	5,839	
12	G. van Winkoop	1,118	
13	Michel Lodewijks	4,565	
14	Tjeerd Kaastra	895	
15	Koen Kraak	942	
16	Stan Lyczak	850	
17	Eric Neef	2,300	
18	R.A. Haverhoek	1,990	
19	Rob de Bakker	1,001	
20	Jac Poelman	764	
21	T.T. van Blommestein-Buttinger	2,178	
22	D.T. Barlagen	1,072	
23	B. Kamminga	4,738	
24	Ab Verhage	2,636	
25	Wouter Vogelesang	3,040	
Total		736,301	

== D66 ==
Candidate list for D66
Number	Candidate	Votes	Result
1	Jan-Willem Bertens	338,632	Elected
2	Laurens-Jan Brinkhorst	50,684	Elected
3	Doeke Eisma	10,566	Elected
4	Johanna Boogerd-Quaak	28,638	Elected
5	Hanneke Gelderblom-Lankhout	14,552	
6	Hans Glaubitz	4,645	
7	Ineke Herweijer	8,488	
8	Arjen Bouter	1,350	
9	Martien van der Does	2,190	
10	Lousewies van der Laan	1,126	
11	Jan-Willem Tellegen	2,332	
12	Joan van Rijswijk	620	
13	Ernst Klatte	375	
14	Jörgen van Nistelrooij	2,032	
15	Erica Jaspers	2,415	
16	Désirée Hoefnagel	976	
17	Gerben Poortinga	1,566	
18	Mamadou Drame	962	
19	Edith Jekel	1,654	
20	Patrick Peters	739	
21	Cees de Geus	865	
22	Hilmar Schurink	880	
23	Willem Heemskerk	3,532	
Total		479,819	

== SGP, GPV and RPF ==
Candidate list for the SGP, GPV and RPF
Number	Candidate	Votes	Result
1	Leen van der Waal	273,343	Elected
2	Hans Blokland	19,393	Elected
3	Rijk van Dam	6,253	Replacement
4	G. Holdijk	1,266	
5	A.H. Poelman	637	
6	Peter van Dalen	559	
7	W. Fieret	705	
8	S. de Vries	1,175	
9	A.W. Biersteker	603	
10	J.J. Verboom	396	
11	H. van Dijk	1,069	
12	W.J.E. Hendriks	462	
13	A.K. van der Staaij	213	
14	Th. Haasdijk	238	
15	J.H. ten Hove	927	
16	G. van den Berg	547	
17	M.P.H. van Haeften	333	
18	J. Pleijsier	145	
19	Roelof Bisschop	402	
20	P. Dijkstra	617	
21	S.O. Voogt	241	
22	H.G. Leertouwer	238	
23	H. Veldman	271	
24	W.G. Rietkerk	949	
25	W.B. Kranendonk	107	
26	E. Boerma	168	
27	A. de Graaf	488	
28	A. de Boer	271	
29	Th. Niemeijer	4,776	
30	N.C. van Velzen	1,232	
Total		313,724	

== A Better Future... ==
Candidate list for A Better Future...
Number	Candidate	Votes	Result
1	Nigel Franks	11,486	
Total		11,486	

== SP (Socialist Party) ==
Candidates for the European Parliament from the SP
SP candidates 1989	(1989)
SP candidates 1994	(1994)
SP candidates 1999	(1999)
SP candidates 2004	(2004)
SP candidates 2009	(2009)
SP candidates 2014	(2014)
SP candidates 2019	(2019)
SP candidates 2024	(2024)

Candidate list for the SP
Number	Candidate	Votes	Result
1	Tiny Kox	38,006	
2	Hans van Hooft	2,233	
3	Fenna Vergeer-Mudde	1,280	
4	Willem Paquay	563	
5	Remi Poppe	1,857	
6	Bob Ruers	519	
7	Jan de Wit	2,881	
8	Mariet Berendsen	606	
9	Theo Cornelissen	696	
10	Yvonne Visser	593	
11	Piet de Ruiter	175	
12	Jean Rouwet	290	
13	Edwin Klomp	158	
14	Olga Jonas-Bakers	498	
15	Jules Iding	873	
16	René Roevers	239	
17	Ger Wouters	388	
18	Peter Verschuren	736	
19	Bernard Gerard	338	
20	Cees Witte	226	
21	Mienk Graatsma	257	
22	Ron van Zeeland	230	
23	Marijke Folmer	302	
24	Josée van der Molen-van Horrik	67	
25	Willy Lourenssen	130	
26	Jan van den Bos	92	
27	Ger van Aalst	99	
28	Johan de Weijs	70	
29	Wiel Senden	96	
30	Ger Klaus	657	
Total		55,155	

== The Greens ==
Candidate list for The Greens
Number	Candidate	Votes	Result
1	Herman Verbeek	76,025	
2	Anneke Boerma	13,020	
3	Miny ten Den	1,058	
4	John Smit	200	
5	Otto ter Haar	405	
6	Olaf Tulen	194	
7	Sanne Trip	1,081	
8	Ron van Wonderen	466	
9	Danielle Kooi	642	
10	Bart Kuiper	260	
11	Jan van Dam	124	
12	Helene Stafleu	239	
13	Gerard Meereboer	113	
14	Maria Kienhuis	282	
15	Jelle Theunisz	104	
16	Peter Pot	138	
17	Nora Borsboom	256	
18	Leo Jacobs	135	
19	Harold Fieren	93	
20	Toine van Bergen	150	
21	Winnie Zaaijer-Bijleveld	131	
22	Ernst Sonneveldt	97	
23	Dirk van Niekerk	108	
24	Jan de Boer	182	
25	Hans Ramaer	277	
26	Ingrid Walda	150	
27	Ferry Colon	59	
28	Kirsten Kuipers	280	
29	Christy Duijvelaar	187	
30	Hein Westerouen van Meeteren	345	
Total		96,801	

== List De Groen ==
Candidate list for List De Groen
Number	Candidate	Votes	Result
1	Jan de Groen	6,915	
2	Peter Schmid	499	
3	Wim van den Berg	167	
4	Hans Nipper	85	
5	Ritz Mual	394	
6	Coos Visser	92	
7	Peter Jacobs	99	
8	Ralph Bakker	57	
9	Roepsing Lalhabadursing	185	
10	Niek Wijngaards	47	
11	Vincent Breed	51	
12	Pieter Hoenderdos	72	
13	Eric Wirtz	163	
Total		8,826	

== CD ==
Candidate list for the CD
Number	Candidate	Votes	Result
1	Wil Schuurman	27,169	
2	Gerard van der Spek	1,567	
3	Chiel Koning	1,325	
4	John Groeneweg	860	
5	Toon Poppe	2,026	
6	Toos Moesman	228	
7	Martin de Regt	369	
8	Willem van Sitteren	387	
9	Nel van der Pol	286	
10	Peter Kossen	147	
11	Cees Krommenhoek	170	
12	Bas Rietveld	156	
13	Gerard Rieff	132	
14	Mart Giesen	223	
15	Eddy Derkink	40	
16	Annie van Elswijk	148	
17	Wim Elsthout	250	
18	Ruud Snijders	51	
19	Cor Rietveld	80	
20	Jan Stoops	33	
21	Cor Zonneveld	274	
22	Hans Janmaat	7,156	
Total		43,077	

== GreenLeft ==
Candidate list for GreenLeft
Number	Candidate	Votes	Result
1	Nel van Dijk	113,346	Elected
2	Joost Lagendijk	3,678	Replacement
3	Hans Schoen	2,196	
4	Alexander de Roo	712	
5	Renée Broekmeulen	2,021	
6	Aletta van der Stap	2,761	
7	Carry-Ann Tjong-Ayong	3,806	
8	Tim Verhoef	593	
9	Erik Meijer	932	
10	Nesrin Cingöz	2,800	
11	Mardoeke Boekraad	344	
12	Saar Boerlage	1,451	
13	Hein Verkerk	308	
14	Ria van der Rijt	437	
15	Ilse Mutsaers	444	
16	Hendrik Jan ter Bals	112	
17	Hans Feddema	305	
18	Jan Muijtjens	1,183	
19	Pyt Jon Sikkema	713	
20	Simone van Geest	2,356	
21	Jack Verduyn Lunel	273	
22	Karin Spaink	2,093	
23	Raf Janssen	402	
24	Rosi Braidotti	1,401	
25	Marcus Bakker	2,257	
26	Bas de Gaaij Fortman	4,770	
27	Bram van der Lek	2,496	
Total		154,190	
