= Bas Belder =

Dutch historian, journalist and politician

Bas Belder MEP
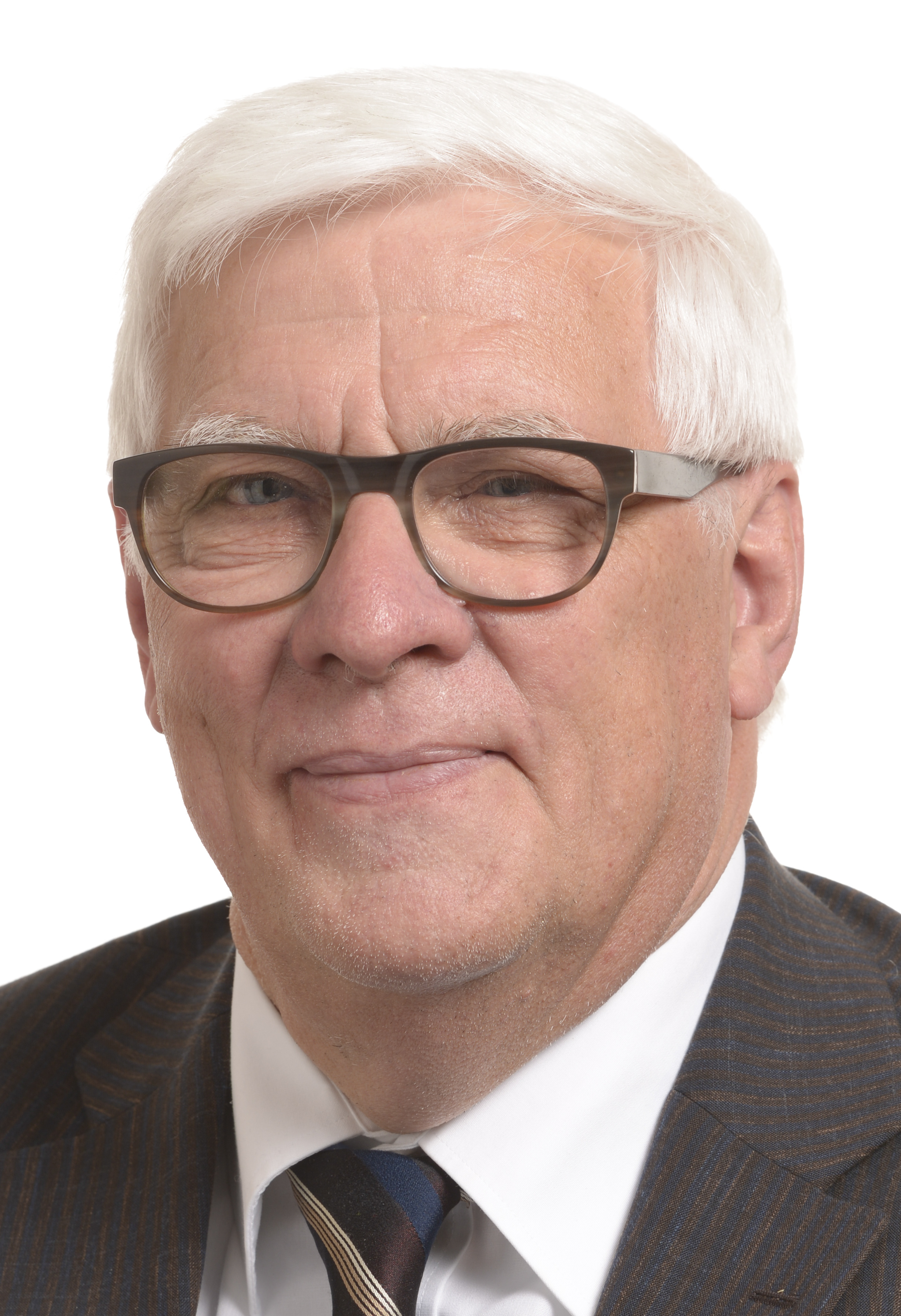

Member of the European Parliament
- In office 13 June 1999 – 2 July 2019
- Constituency: Netherlands

Personal details
- Born: Bastiaan Belder; 25 October 1946 (age 79) Ridderkerk, South Holland, Netherlands
- Party: Dutch; Reformed Political Party; EU; European Conservatives and Reformists
- Children: 3
- Education: Utrecht University
- Website: www.ecpm.info

Bastiaan "Bas" Belder (born 25 October 1946) is a Dutch politician and former Member of the European Parliament (MEP) from the Netherlands. He is a member of the Staatkundig Gereformeerde Partij, part of the European Conservatives and Reformists.

He sat on the European Parliament's Committee on Foreign Affairs. He was a substitute for the Committee on Agriculture. Furthermore he was vice-chairman of the delegation for the relations between the European Parliament and Israel and chairman of the European Parliament Working Group on Human Dignity.

In the 2019 European Parliament election he was succeeded by Bert-Jan Ruissen.

== Education ==
- Higher degree in the history of Eastern Europe from Utrecht University

== Career ==
- 1969–1984: Secondary school teacher (Rotterdam)
- 1984–1999: Foreign editor/commentator Reformatorisch Dagblad (Apeldoorn)
- 1999–2019: Member of the European Parliament
- 1999–2004: First Chairman of the Delegation for relations with the United States
- 2009–2014: Chairman of the Delegation for the relations with Israel
- 2014–2019: Vice-Chairman of the Delegation for the relations with Israel

== Personal life ==
Bas Belder is married and has three children. He is a member of the Protestant Church in the Netherlands (PKN).

== See also ==
- 1999 European Parliament election in the Netherlands
- 2004 European Parliament election in the Netherlands
- 2009 European Parliament election in the Netherlands
- 2014 European Parliament election in the Netherlands
