= Frithjof Schmidt =

German politician (born 1953)

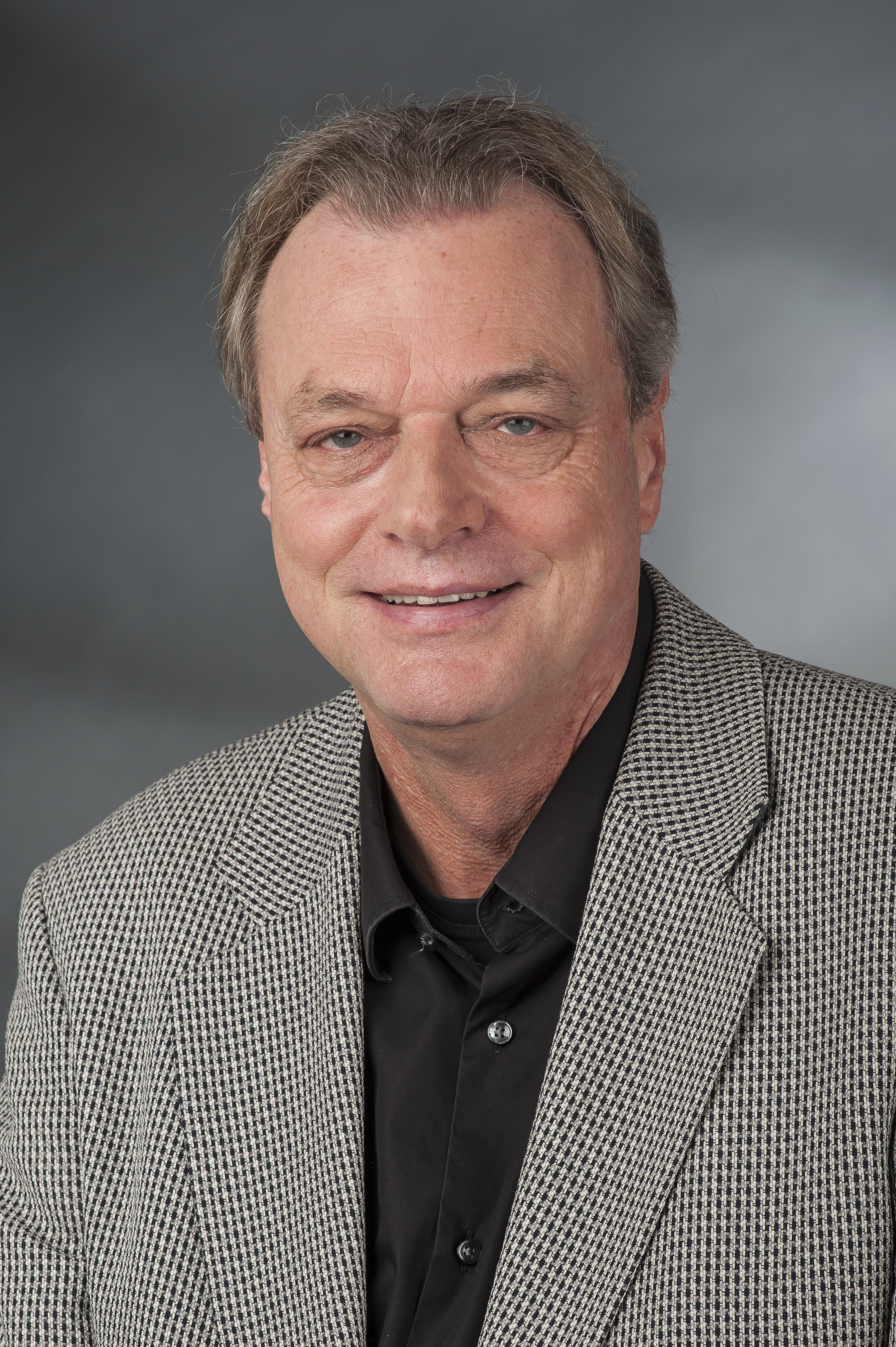

Member of the Bundestag
- In office 2009–2021

Personal details
- Born: April 17, 1952 (age 74) Bad Harzburg, Lower Saxony, West Germany (now Germany)
- Citizenship: German
- Party: Alliance 90/The Greens

Frithjof Schmidt (born 17 April 1953 in Bad Harzburg) is a German politician of the Alliance 90/The Greens who served as member of the Bundestag from 2009 until 2021 and as Member of the European Parliament from 2004 until 2009.

== Early life and career ==
Between 2006 and 2012, Schmidt was publisher-editor of German weekly newspaper Der Freitag.

== Political career ==
Schmidt became a member of Alliance 90/The Greens in 1988. From 1996 to 1998, he was a member of the party's federal executive board under the leadership of Gunda Röstel and Jürgen Trittin.

=== Member of the European Parliament, 2004-2009 ===
Throughout his tenure, Schmidt was a member of the Committee on Development, which he became the vice-chairman of in 2007. From 2005, he also served as a member of the ACP–EU Joint Parliamentary Assembly.

During his time in the European Parliament, Schmidt served as rapporteur on parliamentary resolutions on fair trade and development (2006) as well as on policy coherence for development and the effects of the EU's exploitation of certain biological natural resources on development in West Africa (2008).

=== Member of the Bundestag, 2009-2021 ===
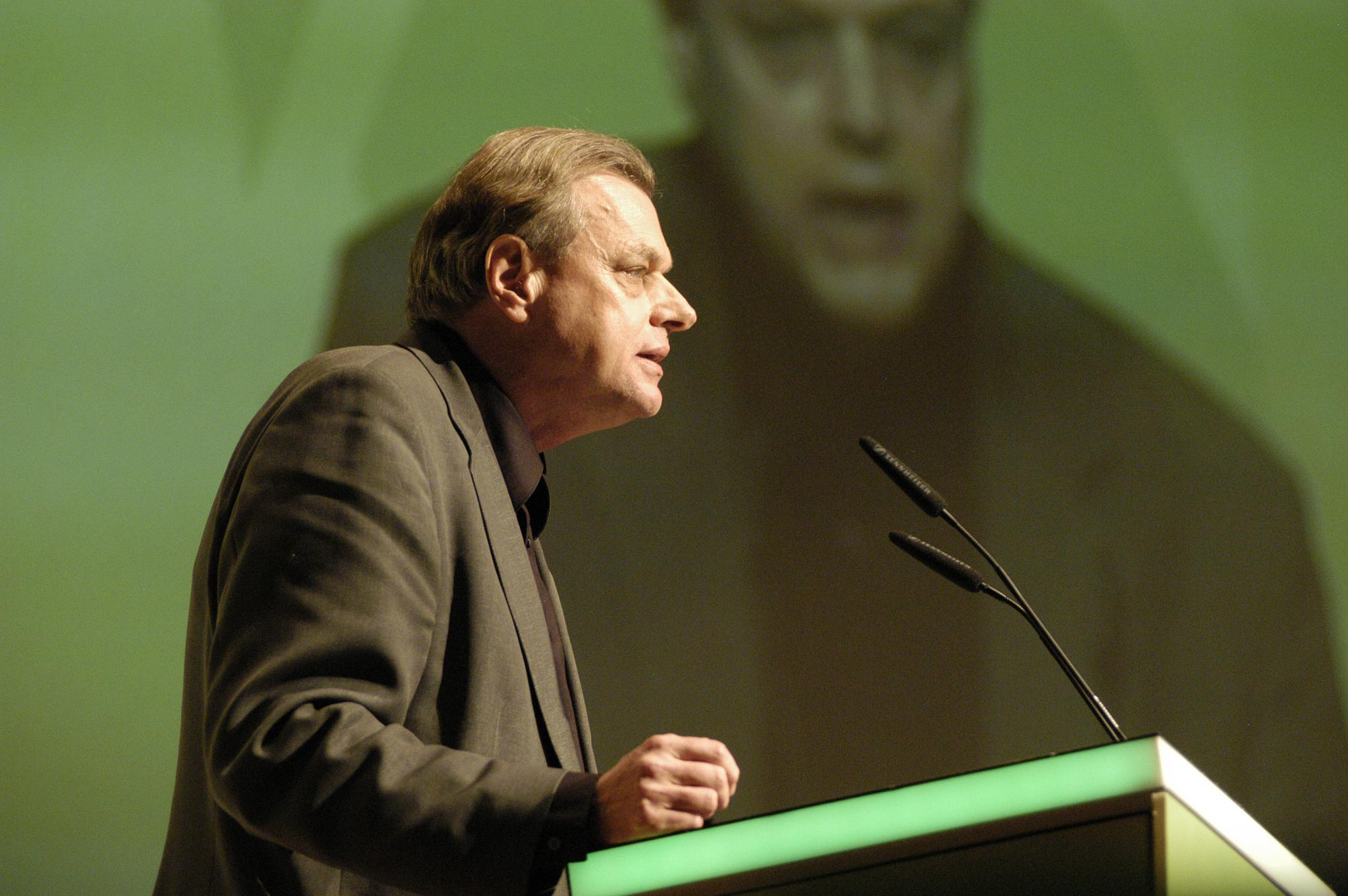
Frithjof Schmidt

In the 2009 German federal elections, Schmidt was elected into the Bundestag. He has since been a member of the Committee on Foreign Affairs.

In his first term between 2009 and 2013, Schmidt was part of his parliamentary group’s leadership around co-chairs Renate Künast and Jürgen Trittin, in charge of foreign policy issues. He was re-elected to that position in 2013, this time under the leadership of Katrin Göring-Eckardt and Anton Hofreiter. Following the 2017 elections, he was replaced by Agnieszka Brugger; instead, he joined the Committee on Foreign Affairs and its Sub-Committee on the United Nations.

In addition to his committee assignments, Schmidt has been a member of the German delegation to the Parliamentary Assembly of the Council of Europe (PACE) from 2018 until 2021. A delegate of the Alliance of Liberals and Democrats for Europe group, he served on the Committee on Political Affairs and Democracy. In this capacity, he authored a 2019 report on the use of digital technologies in the context of elections.

== Other activities ==
- German Council on Foreign Relations (DGAP), Member of the Presidium (since 2014)
- Heinrich Böll Foundation, Member of the Assembly (since 2014)

== Political positions ==
In August 2012, Schmidt was one of 124 members of the Bundestag to sign a letter that was sent to the Russian ambassador to Germany, Vladimir Grinin, expressing concern over the trial against the three members of Pussy Riot. “Being held in detention for months and the threat of lengthy punishment are draconian and disproportionate,” the lawmakers said in the letter. “In a secular and pluralist state, peaceful artistic acts -- even if they can be seen as provocative -- must not lead to the accusation of serious criminal acts that lead to lengthy prison terms.”

In late 2016, Schmidt was part of a group of German left-leaning lawmakers from the Green Party, the center-left Social Democrats (SPD) and the Left Party who met to explore the possibility of forming a coalition government to replace Chancellor Angela Merkel in the 2017 elections.
