= Elly Plooij-van Gorsel =

Dutch politician (born 1947)

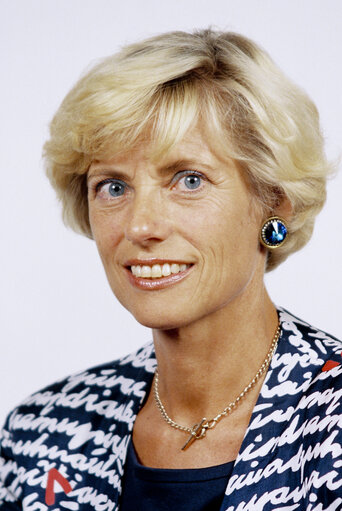
- Born: Pieternella Cornelia Plooij-van Gorsel; 20 March 1947 (age 79); Tholen, Netherlands
- Occupation: Politician
- Political party: People's Party for Freedom and Democracy (Volkspartij voor Vrijheid en Democratie - VVD)

Pieternella Cornelia (Elly) Plooij-van Gorsel (born 20 March 1947 in Tholen, Zeeland) is a former Member of the European Parliament (MEP) in the delegation of the liberal People's Party for Freedom and Democracy (Volkspartij voor Vrijheid en Democratie - VVD), having served in said capacity for a period of ten years.

== Biography ==
=== Early life (1947–1994) ===
Van Gorsel attended high school until 1965, specializing in science. She studied psychology at the University of Utrecht, where she graduated in 1971. In 1971, she became a researcher at the University of Leiden, where she received a PhD in 1980. Her thesis was titled Personality and Arousal: A Research into the Cortical and Autonomous Functions into Relation to Personality. She continued at the University of Leiden as a lecturer. There, she took courses in management and information technology. During this period, she was secretary of the church council of the Remonstrant Church in Oude Wetering and citizen-councillor for the VVD in Alkemade. She was vice-chairperson of the commission for emancipation of the Leiden University Council.

In 1987, van Gorsel switched from science to business and became head of Seminars and Conferences at the NIVE; she also became secretary of the Dutch Association of Professional Conference Organisers. From 1987 and 1991, she was editor for The Liberal Woman, the magazine of the feminist group within the VVD. In 1988, she became chairperson of the Foundation Woman and Management and a member of the International Advisors Board of Governors of the American National Women's Economic Alliance in Washington, D.C. After taking courses in commercial economics in 1990, she became head of sales for Service One Business Catering. From 1991 and 1994, she was treasurer of the Leiden branch of the VVD, and its European contact.

=== Political career (1994–2004) ===
In 1994, she was elected into the European Parliament for the VVD, which is part of the European Liberal Democrat and Reform Party. She became a member of the committee for Research, Technology and Energy and of the committee for External Economic Relations. She was a member of the Delegation for Relations with the United States, and a substitute of the Delegation for Relations with the Czech Republic.

After the 1999 elections, she became a member of the committee for Industry, External Trade, Research and Energy and a substitute for the committee for Economic and Monetary Affairs. She became chairperson of the Delegation for Relations with the People's Republic of China, and a member of the conference of delegation chairpersons. During this period, she was a reporter on the Registration, Evaluation and Authorisation of Chemicals. In 2003, she was appointed draftsperson for the Directive on the patentability of computer-implemented inventions and proposed an amendment for a "grace period" which would have brought European patent practice in the field of software patents closer to the United States practice of "first to invent" as opposed to the European practice of "first to file". Between 2001 and 2002, she was vice-president of the European Parliament.

=== After political career (2004–present) ===
In 2004, Van Gorsel joined Blueprint Partners as senior counsellor. She co-founded the European Internet Foundation, an independent, neutral and non-partisan discussion forum on ICT-related topics, governed by elected members of the European Parliament. She was a member of the Steering Committee of the Trans-Atlantic Policy Network, a network for European and American politicians and businessmen. Van Gorsel is chairperson of the Dutch Expert Council for national standards. She currently resides in Brussels, Belgium.
