= Wytze Russchen =

Dutch writer and politician

- Born: 22 December 1970 (age 55); Netherlands
- Occupations: Writer, lobbyist, politician
- Writing career
- Language: Dutch

Wytze Russchen (born 22 December 1970) is a Dutch writer, lobbyist, and politician.

== Early life and education ==
Russchen was born on 22 December 1970 in Friesland in the Netherlands. During his studies, he started working in the European Parliament in Brussels and Strasbourg, first as an employee of the Euro Liberal Group and later as the political right-hand man of the late Willy De Clercq. For more than three years, he accompanied the former Belgian deputy prime minister, European commissioner and minister of state in his duties as Chairman of the Committee on International Trade and then of the Committee on Legal Affairs and the Internal Market in Parliament.

In 1999, he became a spokesperson and lobbyist for BusinessEurope, the association of European employers. Two years later, he joined the employers' association VNO-NCW in The Hague. In 2004 he returned to Brussels to coordinate the Dutch Presidency of the European Council as Principal Secretary for European Affairs. In 2005, he did the same during the Luxembourg EU presidency, but seconded to Luxembourg employers. In 1999 and 2004 he was a candidate for the European Parliament. In 2006, he was a candidate for the Brussels parliament.

Russchen was the founder of the Dutch Network Brussels, Political Café Brussels, Crazy Orange, former president of the VVD in Brussels and Belgium, and advisor to the Flemish Parkinson's League.

In 2017, he was considered one of the most influential Dutch people in Brussels by the euknowhow.eu platform.
