= Serdar Yüksel =

German politician (born 1973)

Serdar Yüksel MdB
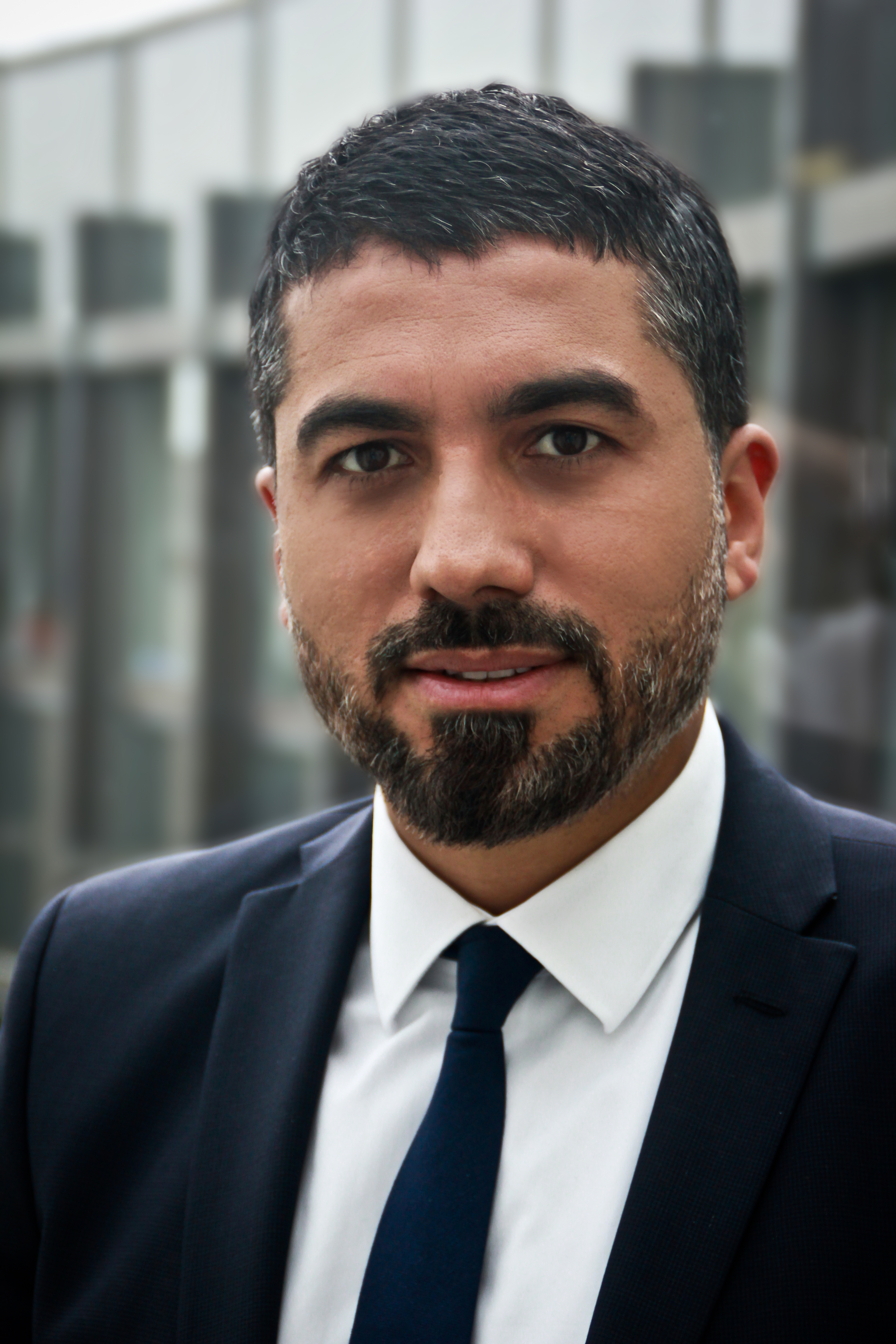
- Yüksel in 2014

Personal details
- Born: 27 April 1973 (age 52) Essen, North Rhine-Westphalia, West Germany
- Party: Social Democratic Party (since 1989)

Serdar Yüksel (born April 27, 1973) is a German politician of the Social Democratic Party (SPD) and current Member of the Bundestag since the 2025 election. He has also been a member of the Landtag of North Rhine-Westphalia since the 2010 election.

== Early life and education ==
Yüksel is the son of a worker of Kurdish descent who immigrated from Turkey to Essen in 1964. His father worked at Krupp and was active in the IG Metall union. Despite a recommendation after primary school to attend Gymnasium, Yüksel first attended Hauptschule. After completing his Hauptschule in Wattenscheid, he attended the Fachoberschule in Bochum and completed an apprenticeship as a nurse in 1994. He worked as an intensive care nurse until 2010. He joined the Social Democratic Party at 15 years old, in 1989.

He is a follower of Alevism.
