= Axel Schäfer =

German politician

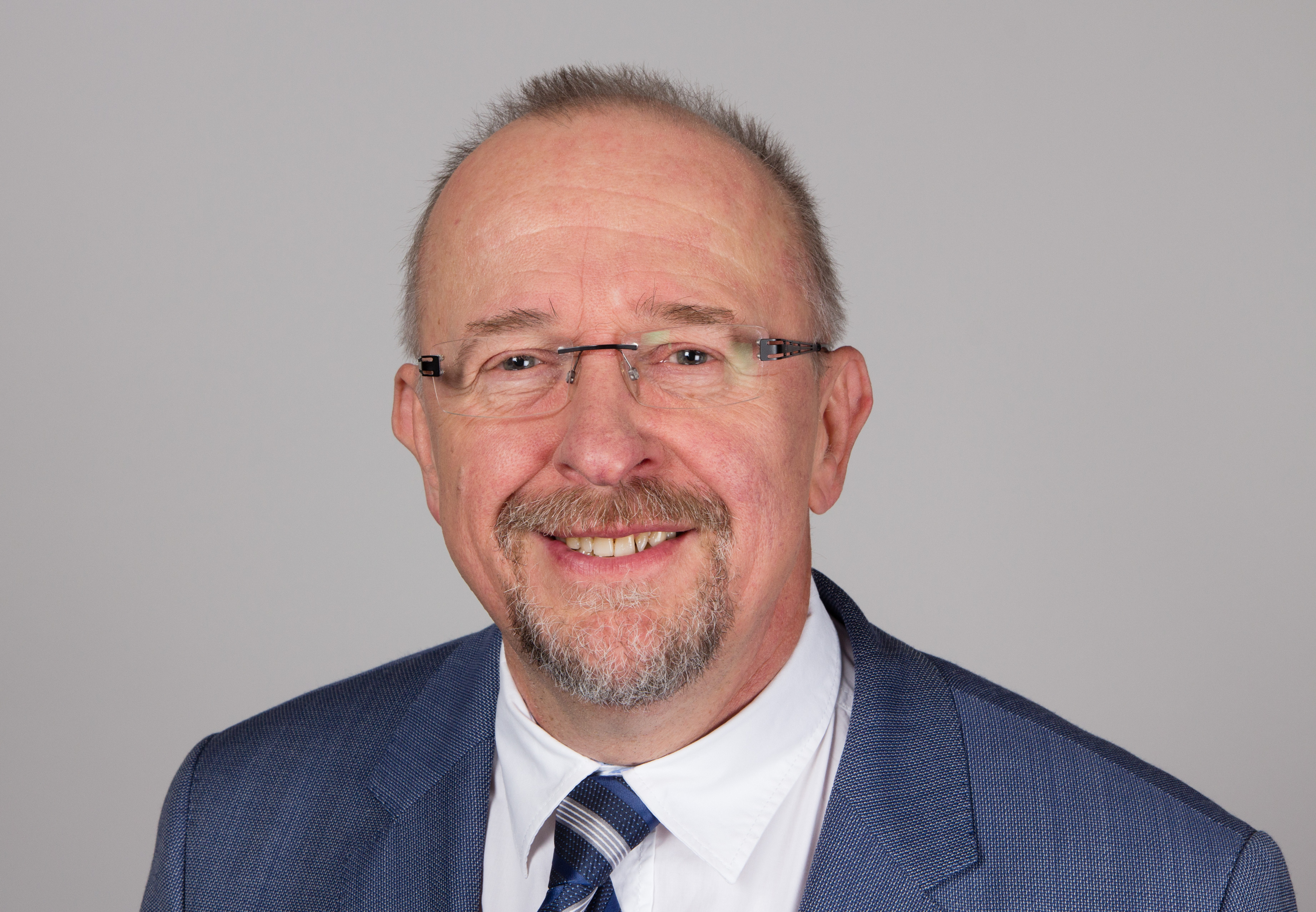
- Axel Schäfer in 2014

Member of the Bundestag
- In office 2002–2025

Member of the European Parliament for Germany
- In office 1994–1999
- Constituency: Party list

Personal details
- Born: Axel Helmut Schäfer; 3 August 1952 (age 73) Frankfurt, West Germany (now Germany)
- Party: SPD

Axel Helmut Schäfer (born 3 August 1952) is a German politician of the Social Democratic Party (SPD). Born in Frankfurt, Hesse, he served as a member of the Bundestag from the state of North Rhine-Westphalia from 2002 to 2025.

== Early life and career ==
After attending elementary school in 1959, he transferred to high school in 1963, graduating in 1968. In the same year, he began vocational training in the public service, which included both vocational school and a training institute. Subsequently, he participated in further education at Ruhr University Bochum from 1981 to 1982 to deepen his knowledge and skills.

He began his professional career in 1968 in the city administration of Frankfurt am Main before moving to the city administration of Bochum in 1972. From 1983 to 1984, he served as the head of the European election office in the SPD party headquarters, where he gained significant experience in the political arena under the leadership of Willy Brandt. Following this, he took over as head of the European office in the SPD district of Western Westphalia from 1984 to 1994, where he played a key role in shaping and implementing European policy issues.

== Political career ==
=== Member of the European Parliament, 1994–1999 ===
Following the 1994 elections, Schäfer served as a one-term Member of the European Parliament. During his time in parliament, he was a member of the Committee on Institutional Affairs and the parliament's delegation to the EU-Poland Joint Parliamentary Committee.

=== Member of the German Parliament, 2002–2025 ===
Schäfer first became a member of the Bundestag in the 2002 German federal election. He was a member of the Committee on European Union Affairs.

Schäfer led the Bundestag group of SPD parliamentarians from North Rhine-Westphalia, the largest delegation within the party's parliamentary group from 2005 until 2013. From 2010 until 2017, he served as deputy chairman of the SPD parliamentary group under the leadership of successive chairpersons Frank-Walter Steinmeier (2010–2013), Thomas Oppermann (2013–2017) and Andrea Nahles (2017).

In the negotiations to form a Grand Coalition of Chancellor Angela Merkel's Christian Democrats (CDU together with the Bavarian CSU) and the SPD following the 2013 German elections, Schäfer was part of the SPD delegation in the working group on banking regulation and the Eurozone, led by Herbert Reul and Martin Schulz.

In addition to his committee assignments, Schäfer chaired the German-Italian Parliamentary Friendship Group from 2018 to 2025. Also in 2018, he joined the German delegation to the Parliamentary Assembly of the Council of Europe (PACE). In the Assembly, he served on the Committee on the Honouring of Obligations and Commitments by Member States of the Council of Europe (Monitoring Committee); the Committee on Culture, Science, Education and Media; and the Sub-Committee on Conflicts between Council of Europe Member States. Alongside Ria Oomen-Ruijten, he was the Assembly’s co-rapporteur on Russia.

In October 2024, Schäfer announced that he would not stand in the 2025 federal elections but instead resign from active politics by the end of the parliamentary term.

== Other activities ==
- German United Services Trade Union (ver.di), Member
- IG BCE, Member
- VfL Bochum, Member

== Political positions ==
Within his parliamentary group, Schäfer belongs to the Parliamentary Left, a left-wing movement.

Following Andrea Nahles’ resignation as chairwoman of the SPD in 2019, Schäfer proposed Manuela Schwesig and Stefan Weil as new leaders. Ahead of the party’s 2019 leadership election, he publicly endorsed Olaf Scholz and Franziska Giffey as potential chairpersons.

Amid the COVID-19 pandemic in Germany, Schäfer supported legislation requiring all adults to be vaccinated.

Following the 2025 elections, Schäfer endorsed Bärbel Bas as candidate to succeed Saskia Esken as co-chair of the SPD.
