= Caroline Nagtegaal =

Dutch politician

Caroline Nagtegaal MEP
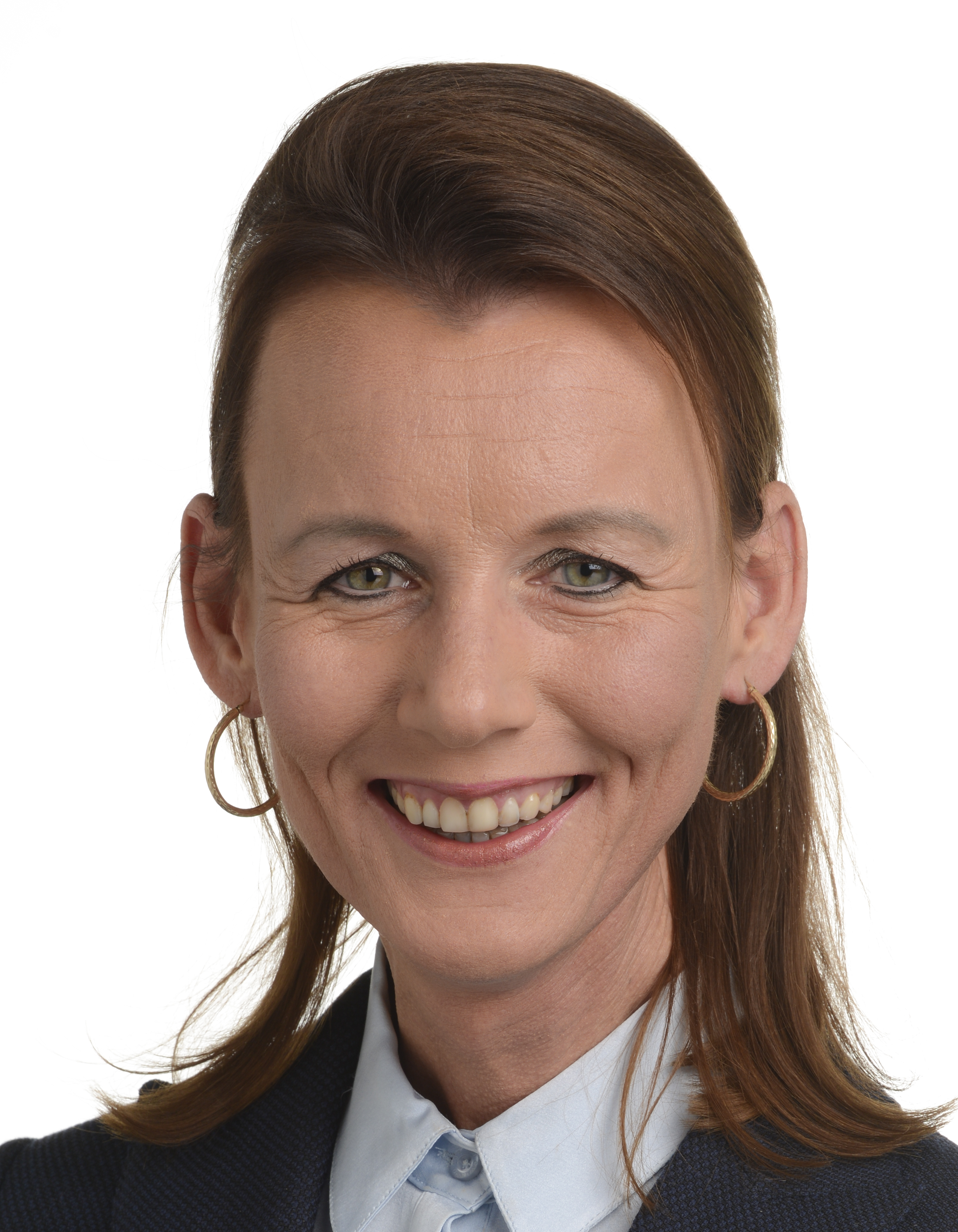

Member of the European Parliament for Netherlands
- In office 14 November 2017 – 15 July 2024

Personal details
- Born: 1 June 1980 (age 45) Utrecht
- Party: People's Party for Freedom and Democracy

Caroline Nagtegaal-van Doorn is a Dutch politician of the People's Party for Freedom and Democracy (VVD) who served as a Member of the European Parliament between 2017 and 2024.

From 2017 until 2019, Nagtegaal served on the Committee on Economic and Monetary Affairs. Following the 2019 elections, she moved to the Committee on Transport and Tourism. In this capacity, she co-authored a 2019 resolution on the cybersecurity risks posed by trade with China. She was shadow rapporteur of a regulation mandating that the distance to the closest charging station can be no more than 60 kilometres (37 mi) on European highways by 2028.

In addition to her committee assignments, Nagtegaal was part of the Parliament's delegations for relations with the Arabian Peninsula, Mercosur and to the Euro-Latin American Parliamentary Assembly (EuroLat). She was also a member of the European Parliament Intergroup on Seas, Rivers, Islands and Coastal Areas and the European Parliament Intergroup on LGBT Rights.

Nagtegaal did not run for re-election in June 2024, and her term as MEP ended on 15 July 2024.
