= Olaf in der Beek =

German politician (born 1967)

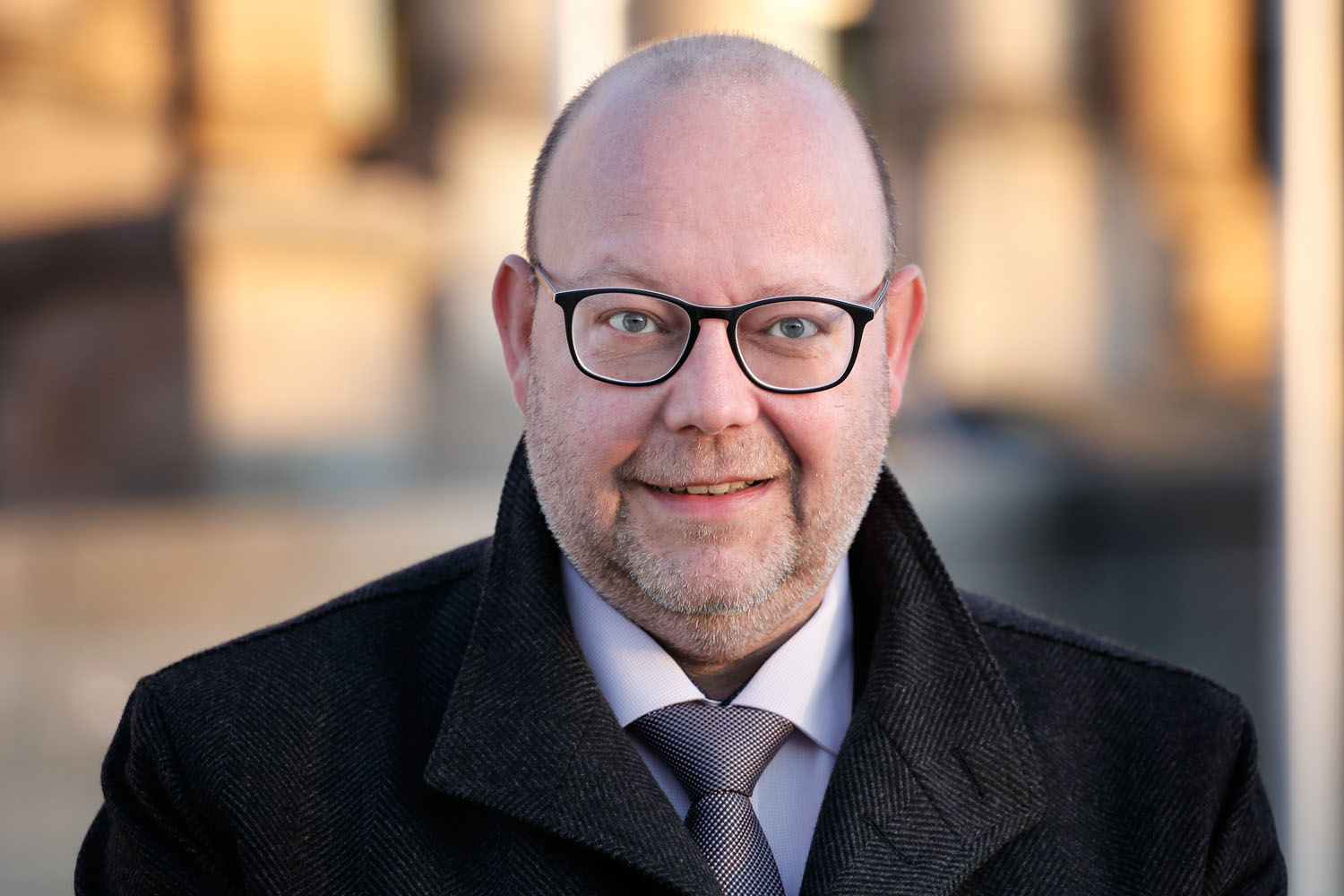
- Beek in 2017

Member of the Bundestag for North Rhine-Westphalia
- In office 24 October 2017 – 2025
- Constituency: FDP List

Personal details
- Born: 31 July 1967 (age 59) Bochum, West Germany
- Party: Free Democratic Party
- Children: 2
- Education: Bochum University of Applied Sciences

Olaf in der Beek (born 31 July 1967) is a German politician of the Free Democratic Party (FDP) who served as a member of the Bundestag from the state of North Rhine-Westphalia from 2017 to 2025.

== Early life and career ==
After obtaining his advanced technical college entrance qualification, in der Beek began studying business administration at the Bochum University of Applied Sciences, which he was unable to complete for family reasons.

Until the completion of his studies, in der Beek worked as advisor to a member of the State Parliament of North Rhine-Westphalia before moving to the media industry in 1993. After being promoted to an executive in the publishing and printing industry, he became self-employed in the media industry in 2008 and was managing partner of a medium-sized affiliated company before moving to the German Bundestag.

== Political career ==
After being active in the FDP and the Young Liberals in der Beek in the 1980s, his membership was then suspended for 20 years and he finally resigned from the party, he re-registered with the Free Democrats in 2013.

In parliament, in der Beek served on the Committee on Economic Cooperation and Development (from 2018), the Committee on the Environment, Nature Conservation and Nuclear Safety (from 2018) and the Subcommittee on International Climate and Energy Policy (since 2022). Following the 2021 elections, he served as his parliamentary group’s spokesperson for climate action.

In addition to his committee assignments, in der Beek was part of the German Parliamentary Friendship Group for Relations with the Southern African States and the German Parliamentary Friendship Group for Relations with Arabic-Speaking States in the Middle East.

In the negotiations to form a so-called traffic light coalition of the Social Democratic Party (SPD), the Green Party and the FDP following the 2021 German elections, in der Beek was part of his party's delegation in the working group on environmental policy, co-chaired by Rita Schwarzelühr-Sutter, Steffi Lemke and Stefan Birkner.

In 2024, in der Beek announced that he wasn't seeking re-election for Bundestag.

== Other activities ==
- German Foundation for World Population (DSW), Member of the Parliamentary Advisory Board
- German-Jordanian Society, Member of the Parliamentary Advisory Board
- German-Mozambican Society, Member of the Advisory Board
