= Marieke Sanders-ten Holte =

Dutch politician (born 1941)

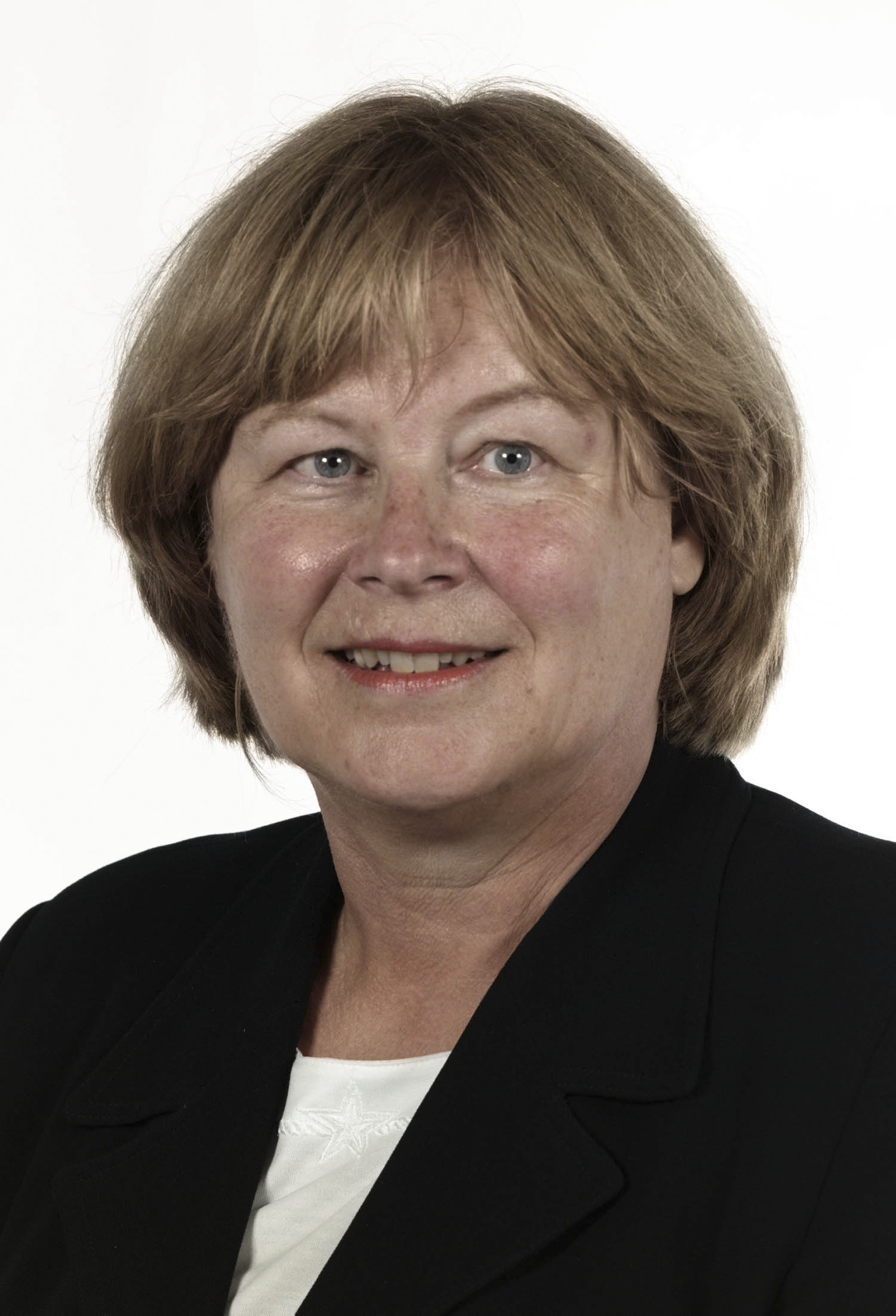
- Sanders-ten Holte in 1999

Member of the European Parliament
- In office 20 July 1999 – 20 July 2004

Member of the provincial council of North Holland
- In office 1987–1999

Personal details
- Born: Maria Johanna ten Holte; 7 November 1941 (age 84) Assen, Netherlands
- Party: VVD
- Spouse: Pieter Sanders (m. 1967; died 2012)
- Children: 2
- Education: University of Groningen Vrije Universiteit Amsterdam

Maria Johanna (Marieke) Sanders-ten Holte (born 7 November 1941) is a Dutch former principal and politician for the People's Party for Freedom and Democracy (VVD).

== Early life and education ==
Sanders-ten Holte was born on 7 November 1941 in Assen, the daughter of a lawyer. After the Municipal Lyceum in Emmen, she studied English at the University of Groningen and literary theory at the Vrije Universiteit Amsterdam.

== Career ==
Sanders-ten Holte started her career as an English teacher. From 1987 to 1999 she was a member of the provincial council of North Holland. Afterwards she was vice-principal at the Coornhert Lyceum in Haarlem. From 1992 to 1994 she served as head of the central office of contract activities at the Inholland University of Applied Sciences in Diemen. In 1994 she continued her career as director of the Dutch Reading Foundation. From 20 July 1999 to 20 July 2004 she was a member of the European Parliament.

Sanders-ten Holte was subsequently appointed Advisor to the Committee of Ministers of the Council of Europe on the Framework Convention for the Protection of National Minorities and the European Charter for Regional or Minority Languages from 2004 to 2019.

In 2006, she was a United Nations Women's Representative and went to the United Nations General Assembly to give a speech.

== Personal life ==
Sanders-ten Holte married Pieter Sanders on 18 March 1967 in Emmen, and has two children.

== Decorations ==
Honours
Ribbon bar	Honour	Country	Date
	Knight of the Order of the Netherlands Lion	Netherlands	1985
