= Ria Oomen-Ruijten =

Dutch politician (born 1950)

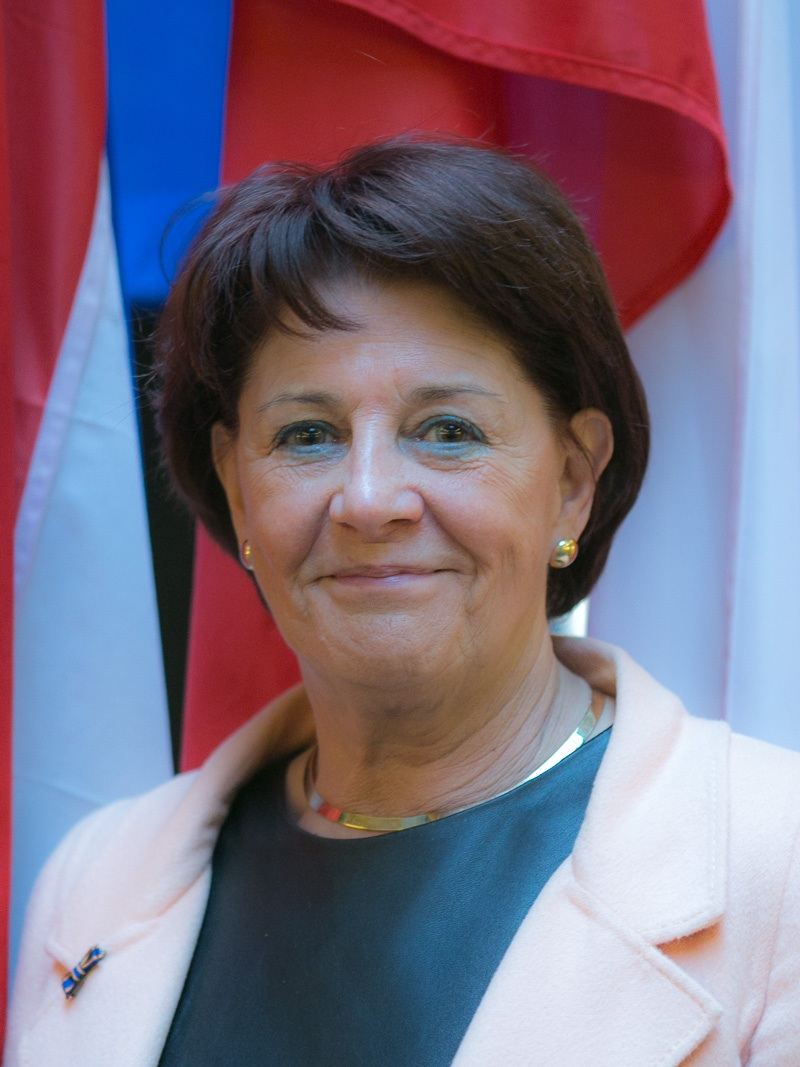
Ria Oomen-Ruijten

Ria Oomen-Ruijten (born 6 September 1950 in Echt, Limburg) is a Dutch politician of the Christian Democratic Appeal (CDA) who has been serving as a member of the Senate since 9 June 2015.

Oomen is a former Member of the European Parliament. As an MEP, she was a member of the bureau of the European People's Party (Christian Democrats) group, she was a member of the European Parliament's Committee on Foreign Affairs, and a substitute member of the Committee on Employment and Social Affairs.

Previously, she was a member of the House of Representatives (June 1981 – September 1989). She dealt mainly with social affairs.

From May 1985, she was chair of The Dutch Foundation for Consumer Complaints Boards (De Geschillencommissie). The Foundation deals with consumer complaints and complaints between enterprises. From January 2013 Hein Blocks succeeded her as chair.

== Early life and education ==
Oomen-Ruijten was born in St. Joost (Echt, province of Limburg in the Netherlands) on 6 September 1950. She obtained a higher vocational diploma in Communication and Public Relations. She studied in Eindhoven, The Netherlands.

== Political career ==
=== Early beginnings ===
From 1974 to 1981, Oomen-Ruijten worked for Provincial Electricity Company (PLEM) as Public Relations Assistant. She became a member of the Politician Youth Organization of the Catholic People's Party, one of the predecessors of the Christian Democratic Appeal, and was elected chairman of the newly founded youth organization of the Christian Democrats before becoming a member of the Dutch House of Representatives in 1981. She was the youngest member at the time and particularly active in the field of social affairs.[2]

=== Member of the European Parliament, 1989–2014 ===
In 1989, Oomen-Ruijten moved to the European Parliament, where she was elected on behalf of the CDA within the Group of the European People's Party (EPP). Between 1989 and 1999, she was a vice president of the EPP.

In parliament, Oomen-Ruijten first served on the Committee on the Environment, Public Health and Consumer Protection (1989–2004) and the temporary Committee on Genetics (2001). Furthermore, she was also a member of the Committee on Employment and Social Affairs (1994–1999, 2004–2007) and the Committee on Equal Rights of Women. Later, she was a member of the Committee on Foreign Affairs (from 2007) and its Subcommittee on Human Rights (from 2009) Among other assignments, she was the European Parliament's rapporteur on the possible accession of Turkey to the European Union, on pension rights of EU citizens on measures against cervical cancer, and on cutting emissions from plants powered by coal and oil.

In addition to her committee assignments, Oomen-Ruijten was part of the parliament's delegations for the EU-Russia Parliamentary Cooperation Committee (2007–2014) as well as for relations with China (2004–2009), South Africa (1994–2004), and the countries of Central America and Mexico (1989–1994).

In 2013, Oomen-Ruijten was one of the candidates to become European Ombudsman. She eventually lost the election in the final round to Emily O'Reilly. On 1 July 2014, she left the European Parliament after 25 years.

=== Member of the Dutch Senate, 2015–present ===
In the Senate, Oomen-Ruijten has been chairing the Committee on European Affairs.

In addition to her role in the Senate, Oomen-Ruijten has been serving as member of the Dutch delegation to the Parliamentary Assembly of the Council of Europe since 2015. In the Assembly, she serves on the Committee on Political Affairs and Democracy (since 2015); the Sub-Committee on Conflicts between Council of Europe Member States (since 2018); the Committee on the Honouring of Obligations and Commitments by Member States of the Council of Europe (since 2020); and the Sub-Committee on External Relations (since 2020). Alongside Axel Schäfer, she was the Assembly's co-rapporteur on Russia from 2020 to 2022. Since 2021, she has been one of the Assembly's vice-presidents, under the leadership of presidents Rik Daems (2021–2022) and Tiny Kox (since 2022).

== Other activities ==
Besides her function as MEP, Oomen-Ruijten remains active in several other fields. She is chairwoman of various social welfare and non-governmental organizations such as the Foundation for the Support and Archers Guild Commission (SAS). She is also committed her to numerous administrative activities in social and cultural institutions.

From May 1985, Oomen was chair of The Dutch Foundation for Consumer Complaints Boards (De Geschillencommissie). The Foundation deals with consumer complaints and complaints between enterprises. From January 2013 Mr Hein Blocks succeeded Ria Oomen-Ruijten as chair.

== Personal life ==
Oomen-Ruijten keeps her voters frequently up to date with her activities within for the Parliament in Brussels and Strasbourg by issuing a monthly newsletter www.riaoomen.nl.[5] On 29 April 1994, Ria Oomen-Ruijten was appointed Knight of the Order of the Dutch Lion. Since April 2004, she is also Grand Officer of the Order of Merit (blue-white cross) from Luxembourg, an award from the European Union. Ria Oomen-Ruijten is a widow of Steph Oomen.

== Curriculum vitae ==
- Higher vocational diploma as PR information/communications assistant
- National Chairwoman, CDA Youth Federation and member of CDA federation administrative committee (1976)
- Member of the Second Chamber and member of CDA parliamentary party executive (1981–1989)
- Chairwoman of The Dutch Foundation for Consumer Complaints Boards (1985–2013)
- Member of EPP Council and Member of EPP Bureau (1989–1999)
- Member of the European Parliament (1989–2014)
- Member of the Bureau of the EPP Group (1989–1999)
- Chairwoman of various social welfare and non-governmental organisations
- Knight of the Order of the Netherlands Lion (1994)
- Member of the Senate (2015–present)
