= 1994 European Parliament election in the Netherlands =

- 9 June 1994

31 seats to the European Parliament
- Turnout: 35.69%
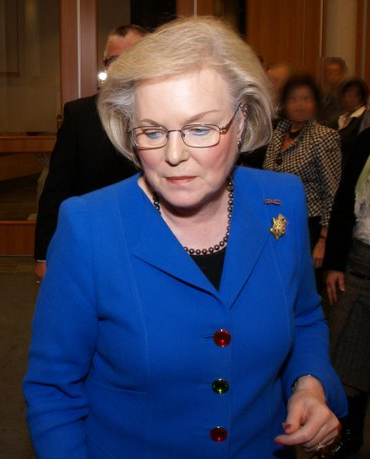

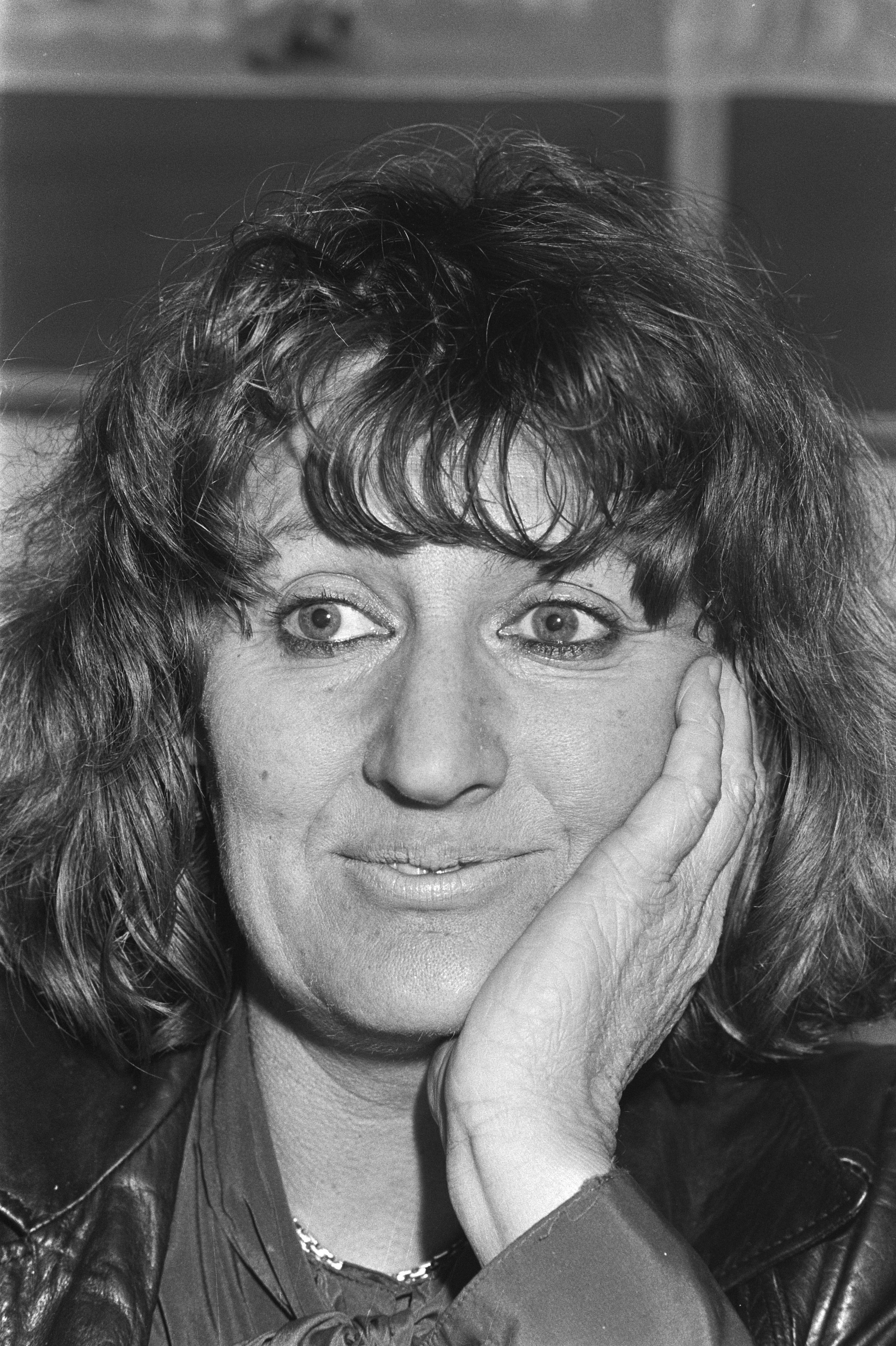

| | First party | Second party | Third party |
|---|---|---|---|
| Leader | Hanja Maij-Weggen | Hedy d'Ancona | Gijs de Vries |
| Party | CDA | PvdA | VVD |
| Alliance | EPP | PES | ELDR |
| Seats won | 10 / 31 | 8 / 31 | 6 / 31 |
| Seat change | 0 | 0 | 3 ▲ |
| Popular vote | 1,271,855 | 945,869 | 740,443 |
| Percentage | 30.77% | 22.88% | 17.91% |
| Swing | 3.8% ▼ | 7.8% ▼ | 3.7% ▲ |
| | Fourth party | Fifth party | Sixth party |
| Leader | Jan-Willem Bertens | Leen van der Waal | Nel van Dijk |
| Party | D66 | SGP/RPF/GPV | GL |
| Alliance | ELDR | EN /I-EN | Greens-EFA |
| Seats won | 4 / 31 | 2 / 31 | 1 / 31 |
| Seat change | 3 ▲ | 1 ▲ | 1 ▼ |
| Popular vote | 481,843 | 322,793 | 154,547 |
| Percentage | 11.66% | 7.81% | 3.74% |
| Swing | 5.7% ▲ | 1.9% ▲ | 3.3% ▼ |

An election of Members of the European Parliament representing Netherlands constituency for the 1994–1999 term of the European Parliament was held on 9 June 1994. It was part of the wider 1994 European election. Eleven parties competed in a D'Hondt type election for 31 seats (up from 25).

== Background ==
=== Combined lists ===
Several parties combined in one list to take part in this European Election and increase their chance on a seat in the European Parliament. These combined lists are:

1. SGP, RPF and GPV

=== Electoral alliances ===
No lists formed an electoral alliance.

=== Voting right ===
All subjects from other member states in the Netherlands were allowed to vote this election. It's no longer necessary that the member state of which the subject is from does the same. Only for this election no ahead registration had to take place to take part.

These people got right to vote in this fifth election for the European Parliament in 1994 in the Netherlands:

- Everyone who was allowed to vote in the Dutch parliament elections;
- Dutch who are resident anywhere in the world and did not already have voting rights for the Dutch Parliament elections; (except for Dutch living in the Netherlands Antilles and Aruba, because they vote for the Estates of the Netherlands Antilles. Dutch from the Netherlands Antilles en Aruba are allowed to vote for European Elections if they lived for at least 10 years in the Netherlands.)
- Subjects of one of the other Member States which have residence in the Netherlands.

=== Numbering of the candidates list ===
The official order and names of candidate lists:

Candidate lists for the 1994 European Parliament election in the Netherlands
| List | | English translation | List name (Dutch) |
|---|---|---|---|
| 1 | list | CDA - European People's Party | CDA – Europese Volkspartij |
| 2 | list | P.v.d.A./European Social Democrats | P.v.d.A./Europese Sociaaldemocraten |
| 3 | list | VVD/European Liberal-Democrats | VVD/Europese Liberaal-Democraten |
| 4 | list | D66 | |
| 5 | list | SGP, GPV and RPF | SGP, GPV en RPF |
| 6 | list | A Better Future... | Een Betere Toekomst... |
| 7 | list | SP (Socialist Party) | SP (Socialistische Partij) |
| 8 | list | The Greens | De Groenen |
| 9 | list | List De Groen | Lijst De Groen |
| 10 | list | CD | |
| 11 | list | GREENLEFT | GROENLINKS |

== Results ==
The liberal VVD and D66 parties and the orthodox Protestant alliance of Political Reformed Party, Reformatory Political Federation and Reformed Political Alliance profited from the expansion of the number of seats. While the Christian Democratic Appeal and the Labour Party lost a considerable number of votes, but remained stabile in seats. 35.69% of Dutch citizens turned out on election day.

| Party | Votes | % | Seats | +/– |
|---|---|---|---|---|
| Christian Democratic Appeal | 1,271,855 | 30.77 | 10 | 0 |
| Labour Party | 945,869 | 22.88 | 8 | 0 |
| People's Party for Freedom and Democracy | 740,443 | 17.91 | 6 | +3 |
| Democrats 66 | 481,843 | 11.66 | 4 | +3 |
| SGP–GPV–RPF | 322,793 | 7.81 | 2 | +1 |
| GroenLinks | 154,547 | 3.74 | 1 | –1 |
| The Greens | 97,206 | 2.35 | 0 | New |
| Socialist Party | 55,311 | 1.34 | 0 | 0 |
| Centre Democrats | 43,299 | 1.05 | 0 | 0 |
| A Better Future... | 11,547 | 0.28 | 0 | New |
| List de Groen | 8,844 | 0.21 | 0 | New |
| Total | 4,133,557 | 100.00 | 31 | +6 |
| Valid votes | 4,133,557 | 99.68 | | |
| Invalid/blank votes | 13,173 | 0.32 | | |
| Total votes | 4,146,730 | 100.00 | | |
| Registered voters/turnout | 11,618,677 | 35.69 | | |
Source: Kiesraad

=== European groups ===
Summary of the 9 June 1994 European Parliament elections in the Netherlands
1994
| European group | | Seats 1989 | Seats 1994 | Change |
| European People's Party | EPP | 10 | 10 | 0 |
| European Liberal Democrat and Reform Party | ELDR | 4 | 10 | 6 ▲ |
| Party of European Socialists | PES | 8 | 8 | 0 |
| Green Group in the European Parliament | G/EFA | 2 | 1 | 1 ▼ |
| Europe of Nations | EN | 0 | 2 | 2 ▲ |
| Non-Inscrits | NI | 1 | 0 | 1 ▼ |
| | | 25 | 31 | 6 ▲ |
