= 1999 European Parliament election in the Netherlands =

- 10 June 1999

31 seats to the European Parliament
- Turnout: 30.02%
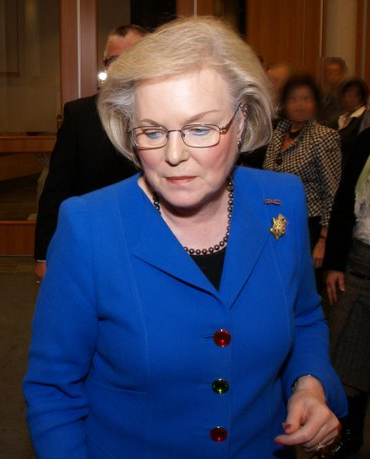

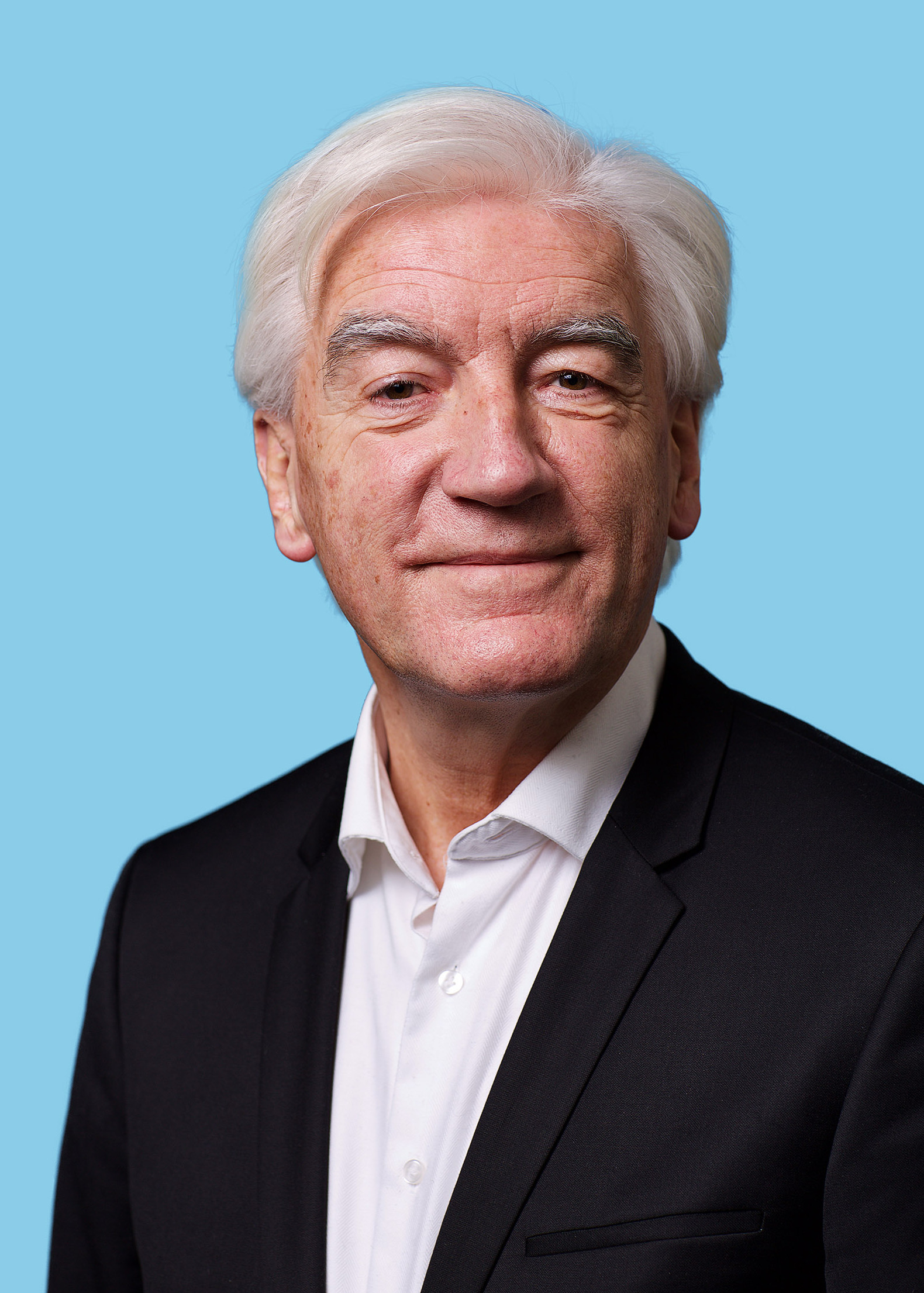

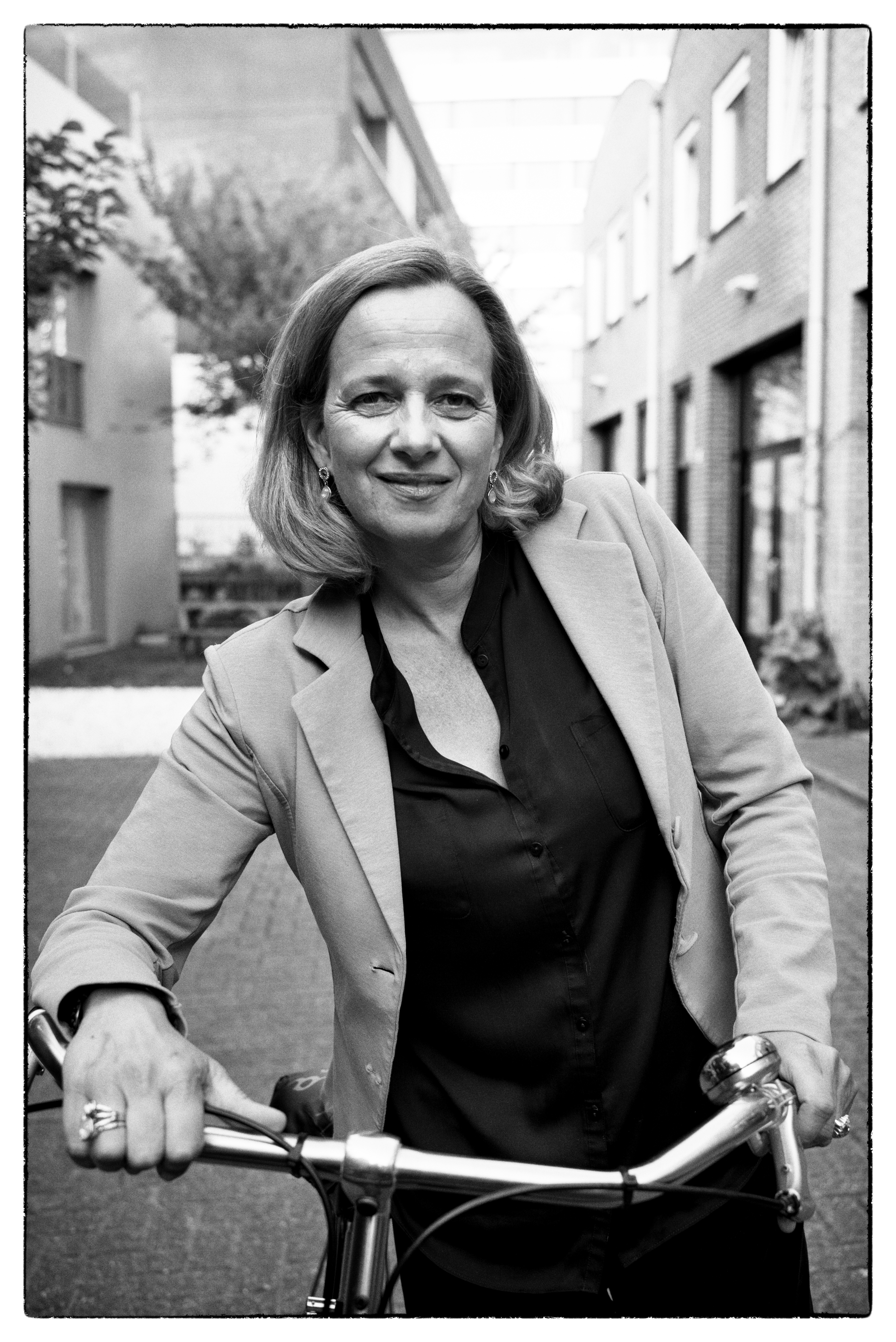

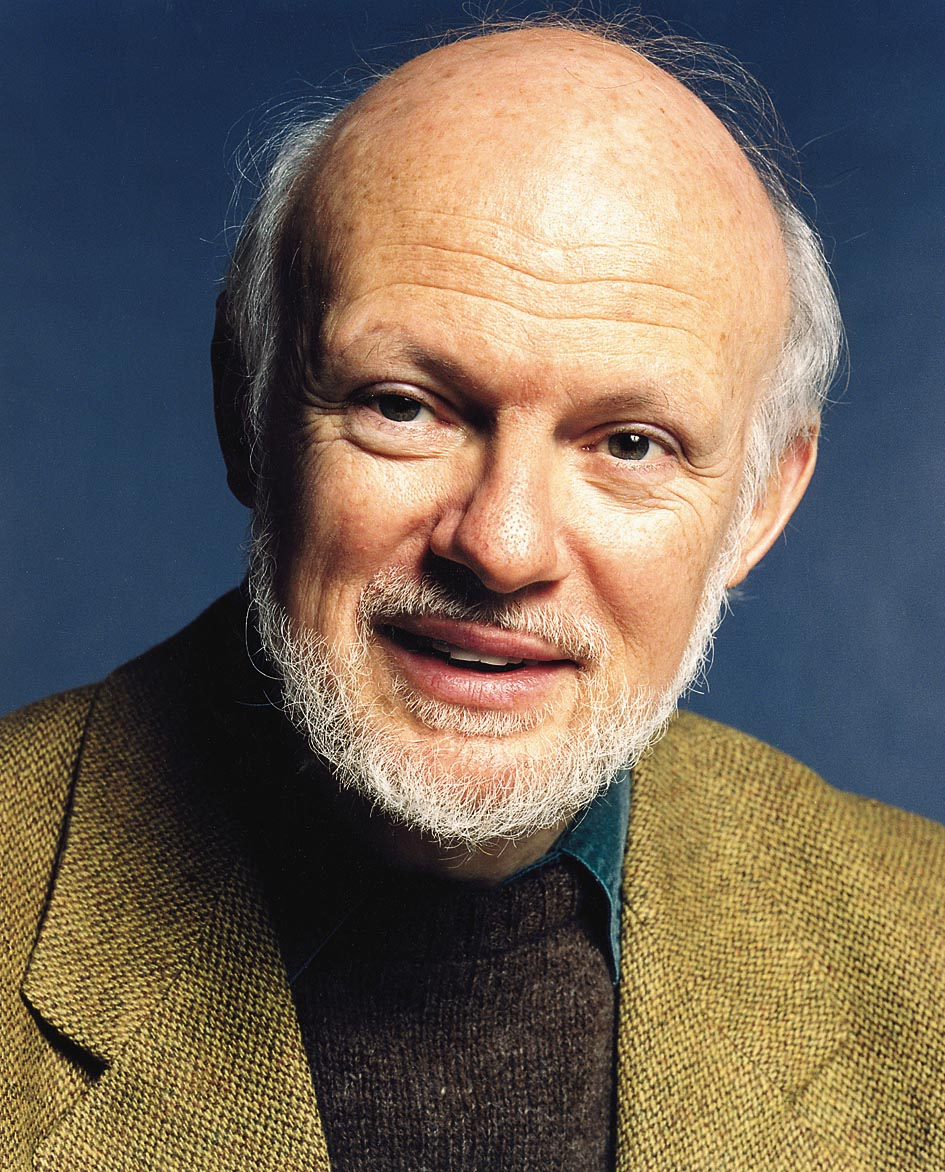
	First party	Second party	Third party
Leader	Hanja Maij-Weggen	Max van den Berg	Jan-Kees Wiebenga
Party	CDA	PvdA	VVD
Alliance	EPP-ED	PES	ELDR
Seats won	9 / 31	6 / 31	6 / 31
Seat change	1 ▼	2 ▼	0
Popular vote	954,898	712,929	698,050
Percentage	26.94%	20.11%	19.69%
Swing	3.9% ▼	2.8% ▼	2.2% ▲
	Fourth party	Fifth party	Sixth party
Leader	Joost Lagendijk	Hans Blokland	Lousewies van der Laan
Party	GL	SGP/RPF/GPV	D66
Alliance	Greens-EFA	EDD	ELDR
Seats won	4 / 31	3 / 31	2 / 31
Seat change	3 ▲	1 ▲	2 ▼
Popular vote	419,869	309,612	205,623
Percentage	11.85%	8.74%	5.80%
Swing	8.1% ▲	0.9% ▲	5.9% ▼
	Seventh party
Leader	Erik Meijer
Party	SP
Alliance	EUL/NGL
Seats won	1 / 31
Seat change	1 ▲
Popular vote	178,642
Percentage	5.04%
Swing	3.7 ▲

An election of Members of the European Parliament representing Netherlands constituency for the 1999–2004 term of the European Parliament was held on 10 June 1999. It was part of the wider 1999 European election. Eleven parties competed in a D'Hondt type election for 31 seats.

== Background ==
=== Combined lists ===
Several parties combined in one list to take part in this European Election and increase their chance on a seat in the European Parliament. These combined lists are:

1. SGP, RPF and GPV

=== Electoral alliances ===
No lists formed an electoral alliance.

=== Numbering of the candidates list ===
The official order and names of candidate lists:

Candidate lists for the 1999 European Parliament election in the Netherlands
List		English translation	List name (Dutch)
1	list	CDA - European People's Party	CDA – Europese Volkspartij
2	list	P.v.d.A./European Social Democrats	P.v.d.A./Europese Sociaaldemocraten
3	list	VVD - European Liberal-Democrats	VVD – Europese Liberaal-Democraten
4	list	D66	
5	list	SGP, GPV and RPF	SGP, GPV en RPF
6	list	GREENLEFT	GROENLINKS
7	list	CD/Conservative Democrats	CD/Conservatieve Democraten
8	list	List Sala	Lijst Sala
9	list	European Electorate Platform Netherlands	Europees Verkiezers Platform Nederland
10	list	SP (Socialist Party)	SP (Socialistische Partij)
11	list	THE EUROPEAN PARTY	DE EUROPESE PARTIJ

== Results ==
Voter turnout was a record low for a national election of just 30.02%. In the election the GreenLeft performed particularly well quadrupling their seats from one to four. The Socialist Party won its first seat. These gains were made at the cost of the Christian Democratic Appeal, Democrats 66 and the PvdA, which lost one, two and two seats respectively.

Party	Votes	%	Seats	+/–
Christian Democratic Appeal	954,898	26.94	9	–1
Labour Party	712,929	20.11	6	–2
People's Party for Freedom and Democracy	698,050	19.69	6	0
GroenLinks	419,869	11.85	4	+3
SGP–GPV–RPF	309,612	8.74	3	+1
Democrats 66	205,623	5.80	2	–2
Socialist Party	178,642	5.04	1	+1
European Party	23,231	0.66	0	New
Centre Democrats	17,740	0.50	0	0
European Electorate Platform Netherlands	13,234	0.37	0	New
List Sala	10,580	0.30	0	New
Total	3,544,408	100.00	31	0
Valid votes	3,544,408	99.54		
Invalid/blank votes	16,356	0.46		
Total votes	3,560,764	100.00		
Registered voters/turnout	11,862,864	30.02		
Source: Kiesraad

=== European groups ===
The EPP-ED group becomes the biggest group this election despite losing seat. This because the ELDR group in the Netherlands lost 2 seats from the Democrats 66. The EG-EFA group makes a big gain in seat, thanks to the win of GreenLeft. The Socialist Party won EUL-NGL its first seat in the Netherlands.

Summary of the 10 June 1999 European Parliament elections in the Netherlands
1999
European group		Seats 1994	Seats 1999	Change
European People's Party–European Democrats	EPP-ED	10	9	1 ▼
European Liberal Democrat and Reform Party	ELDR	10	8	2 ▼
Party of European Socialists	PES	8	6	2 ▼
The Greens–European Free Alliance	Greens-EFA	1	4	3 ▲
Europe of Democracies and Diversities	EDD	2	3	1 ▲
European United Left–Nordic Green Left	EUL-NGL	0	1	1 ▲
Non-Inscrits	NI	0	0	0
		31	31	0

=== 5 largest municipalities ===
Results in the five largest municipalities
Municipality	CDA	PvdA	VVD	GL	SGP–GPV–RPF	D66	SP	Others
Amsterdam	9.1 (11 957)	27.2 (35 921)	17.4 (22 886)	24.6 (32 469)	1.5 (2 021)	9.1 (11 938)	7.2 (9 431)	4.0 (5 251)
Rotterdam	16.5 (15 649)	27.3 (25 936)	18.4 (17 412)	13.1 (12 459)	5.8 (5 503)	7.4 (7 056)	8.1 (7 707)	3.3 (3 113)
The Hague	16.7 (13 068)	20.5 (16 058)	26.2 (20 490)	13.6 (10 605)	4.0 (3 103)	12.2 (9 516)	4.8 (3 782)	2.0 (1 589)
(Utrecht (municipality)) Utrecht	14.2 (8 094)	22.3 (12 710)	16.0 (9 109)	26.2 (14 900)	3.3 (1 862)	9.6 (5 442)	6.9 (3 923)	1.5 (880)
Eindhoven	27.1 (11 294)	19.7 (8 205)	19.5 (8 120)	15.2 (6 325)	2.0 (849)	6.5 (2 727)	8.1 (3 393)	1.9 (789)
