= FI =

FI or fi may refer to:

== Places ==
- Falkland Islands, a British Overseas Territory
- Finland (ISO country code FI)
  - Finnish language (ISO 639 alpha-2 code "fi")
  - .fi, top-level domain of Finland
- Province of Firenze, Italy

== Arts, entertainment, and media ==
- fi (album), a 2005 album by Bibio
- Fi (TV series), a 2017 Turkish Internet TV series
- Fi (The Legend of Zelda), a character in the 2011 video game The Legend of Zelda: Skyward Sword
- Fi, the pitch equivalent to the fourth scale degree raised a half step, in the Solfège music education method
- Films Incorporated, a defunct educational movie company abbreviated to FI

== Businesses and organizations ==
- Feminist Initiative (Sweden), a political party
- Finansinspektionen, the Financial Supervisory Authority in Sweden
- Forza Italia, an Italian political party
- Fourth International, an international communist organisation
- Franciscans International, an NGO at the United Nations
- Freudenthal Institute, a research institute that is part of Utrecht University
- Front de l'Indépendance, a Belgian resistance organization in World War II
- Icelandair (IATA code FI, from the old name of the company, Flugfélag Íslands)
- La France Insoumise, a French political party
- Financial Institution, establishment that focuses on the financial and/or monetary sector

== Technology ==
- fi, a scripting command in the Bourne shell and its derivatives
- Fast Infoset, a standard for binary XML Infoset encoding
- Fuel injection, a system for introducing fuel into internal combustion engines
- High fidelity (disambiguation) (hi-fi)
- Lo-fi (disambiguation)
- Google Fi Wireless, a mobile virtual network operated by Google

== Other uses ==
- ﬁ (fi), a typographical ligature
- Fecal incontinence
- Fi (letter), a Georgian letter
- Fiona Hammond (born 1983), Australian water polo player nicknamed "Fi"

== See also ==
- "Fee-fi-fo-fum", the first line of an historical quatrain (or sometimes couplet) famous for its use in the classic English fairy tale "Jack and the Beanstalk"
- FEI (disambiguation)
- Fie (disambiguation)
- Phi (Φ), a letter of the Greek alphabet
