= Fie =

Fie or FIE may refer to:

== People ==
- Fie Hækkerup (born 1994), Danish politician
- Fie Woller (born 1992), a Danish handball player for SG BBM Bietigheim and the Danish national team

== Places ==
- Fie, Norway or Fidje, a village in the municipality of Risør in Norway
- Cape Fie, a cape marking the southeast extremity of Bouvetøya in the South Atlantic Ocean
- Fair Isle Airport (IATA airport code FIE), Fair Isle, Shetland, Scotland, UK

== Groups, companies, organizations ==
- Fédération Internationale d'Escrime, an international fencing body
- FIE Foundation, a charity trust established in 1970
- Fie! Records, a record label
- FlyOne Armenia (ICAO airline code FIE)

== Other uses ==
- Fyer language (ISO 639 language code fie)
- Fie (grape), a French wine grape
- FIE Standard, a program by Reuven Feuerstein (Feuerstein's Instrumental Enrichment)
- FIE3 (ftz instability element 3') element, an RNA element found in the 3' UTR of the fushi tarazu mRNA

== See also ==
- FEI (disambiguation)
- FI (disambiguation)
- FLE (disambiguation)
- F1E (disambiguation)
