= Hyundai Corporation =

South Korean investment firm

Korean name
- Hangul: 현대코퍼레이션
- Hanja: 現代綜合商事
- RR: Hyeondaekopeoreisyeon
- MR: Hyŏndaek'op'ŏreisyŏn

Hyundai Corporation (Korean: 현대코퍼레이션; KRX: 011760) is a South Korean trading and investment company headquartered in Seoul.

Founded in 1976 as part of the Hyundai chaebol, the company conducts international trading, resource development, overseas investment, project development, and related business across the automotive, steel, machinery, electrical equipment, chemicals, energy, industrial sectors, etc.

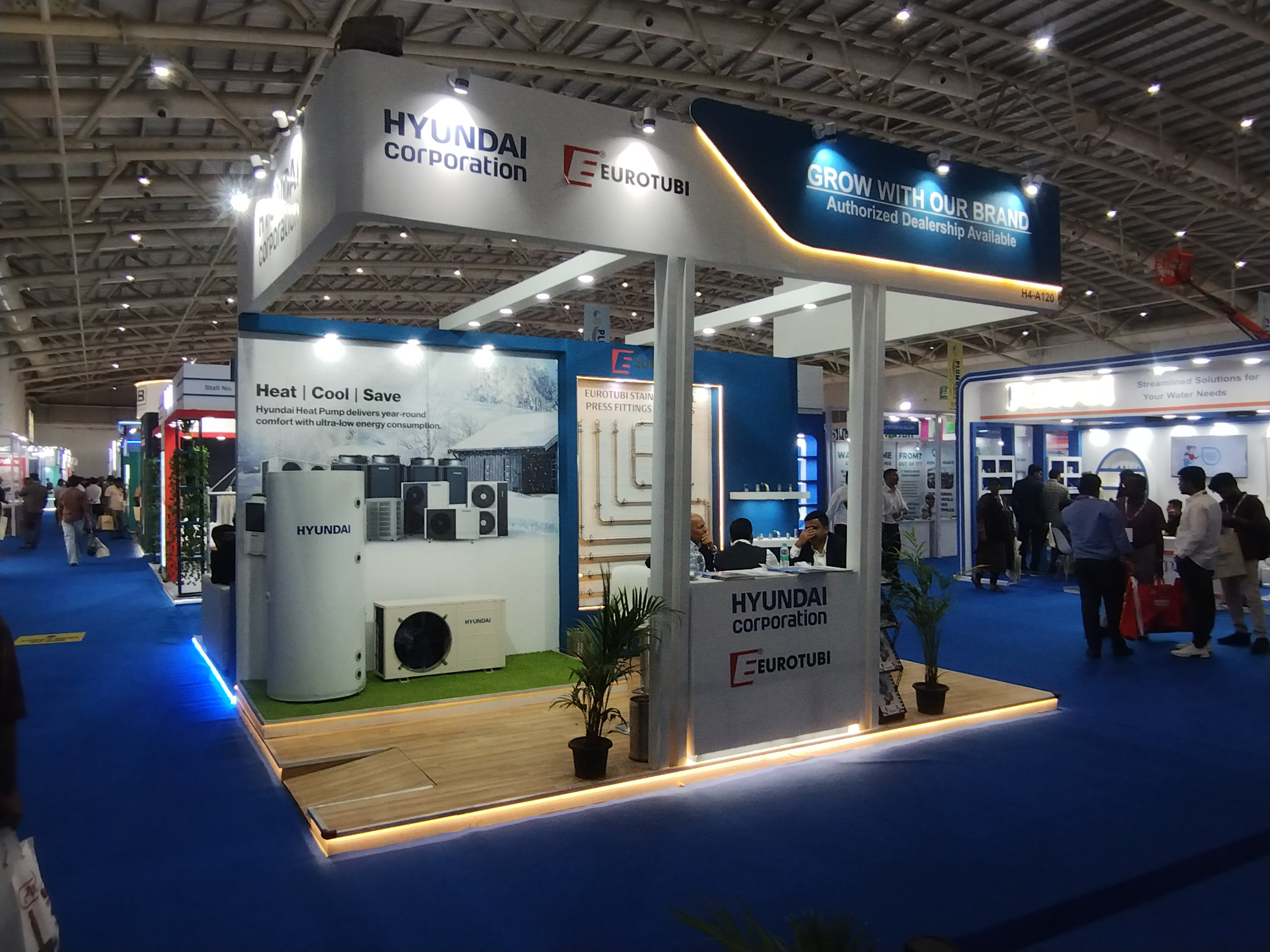
Hyundai Corporation at Plumbex India 2026, BIEC

Hyundai Corporation remains primarily a trading company, but since the early 2020s it has expanded its activities through equity investments, acquisitions and new operating businesses, including automotive components, renewable-energy recycling and construction-equipment rental.

Hyundai Corporation recorded sales of ₩41,000,000,000,000 in 2001. It was the highest sales in Korea as a company. Hyundai Corporation was awarded US$25,000,000,000 Export-Tower Award, due to its export was $25,280,000,000 (1999 July-2000 June). During the same period, those the company behind Hyundai Corporation such as Samsung, LG, SK, Daewoo recorded its export respectively $22,500,000,000, $12,300,000,000, $5,800,000,000, $5,800,000,000.

FY2025 consolidated sales were ₩ 7.5543 trillion, operating profit ₩ 140.1 billion, and net income ₩86.8 billion.

== History ==
Hyundai Corporation was established in December 1976, and was listed on the Korea Stock Exchange in 1977. It developed as one of South Korea's major general trading companies, handling exports and imports of automobiles, machinery, industrial equipment, steel, chemicals and other commodities.

During the 1980s and 1990s, the company expanded its international trading network and participated in overseas resource-development and infrastructure projects.

In 2000, Hyundai Corporation recorded annual exports of approximately $25 billion. During the same period, the company participated in overseas natural-resource projects, including liquefied natural gas projects in Oman, Qatar, and Yemen.

In December 2009, HD Hyundai Heavy Industries acquired a controlling interest in Hyundai Corporation. Hyundai Corporation subsequently separated from the HHI group in March 2016, and became part of an independent Hyundai Corporation Group.

In 2021, the company changed its Korean corporate name from Hyundai Jonghap Sangsa (Korean: 현대종합상사) to Hyundai Corporation. The company stated that the change was intended to reduce its identification solely with general trading and reflect the diversification of its business activities.

During the 2020s, Hyundai Corporation expanded into new operating and investment businesses. These included an automotive-parts manufacturer in Korea, construction-equipment rental activities in Australia, investment in German PV module recycling company, etc.

== Hyundai Corporation's business fields ==
Hyundai Corporation's principal activity remains international trading.

Its major business areas include:

- Trading; Ships, Automobiles, Machinery, Plant, Electric & Electronics, Chemicals, Steel & Metal, Coal, and other raw materials etc.
- Project Organization; Power Plants, Roads, Off-Shore Facilities, and Industrial Plants etc.
- Resource Development; LNG in Yemen/Oman/Qatar, Coal Mine in Drayton Australia, and 11-2 Gas block in Vietnam etc.
- Overseas Investment; Qingdao Hyundai Shipbuilding in China, Inti Industrial Complex in Indonesia, POS-Hyundai Coil Center etc.
- Manufacturing the small sub brands: Licences and manufacturers power equipment for the Hyundai Power Products brand, and exports them to many regions (except UK and Ireland which is done under Genpower Ltd for imported, distributed, and supported).

== Business Diversification and Investments ==
Since the early 2020s, Hyundai Corporation has sought to diversify its business model beyond traditional general trading through direct investments, acquisitions and the development of new businesses. The company has described this strategy as developing into an investment-oriented trading company, using its international trading network and financing capabilities to invest in and expand businesses in adjacent industries.

In 2025, Hyundai Corporation acquired a controlling interest in Sigma, a South Korean manufacturer of automotive components specializing in vehicle interior lighting. The company was subsequently renamed Lucinova Co., Ltd. Hyundai Corporation's consolidated financial statements reported KRW 52.3 billion in cash consideration related to the acquisition. The transaction formed part of Hyundai Corporation's efforts to expand from automobile trading and distribution into automotive component manufacturing.

== Global Operations ==
Hyundai Corporation operates through 42 global business networks across Asia, Europe, the Middle East, Africa, North America, South America and Oceania.

Its overseas operations include trading subsidiaries, representative offices, industrial operations and investments. Examples include operations in the U.S., Canada, Germany, Poland, Turkey, Italy, UAE, China, Japan, Singapore, Indonesia, Vietnam, India, South Africa, Australia, etc.

== Management ==
As of 2026, Hyundai Corporation's representative directors are:

- Chung Mong-hyuck - Group Chairman
- Kim Won-kab - Group Vice Chairman
- Chang Ahn-seok - Group CEO
