= Lifi =

Lifi may refer to:

- Lifi (manhwa), Korean manhwa comic by Sanho Kim
- Li-Fi (light fidelity), wireless data networking using light
- Li-Fi Consortium, industry consortium for the promotion and development of the LiFi standard

== See also ==
- High fidelity (disambiguation)
- Hi-fi
- Wi-Fi
- Fi (disambiguation)
- Li (disambiguation)
