= FLE =

FLE may refer to:

- Family life education
- Federal law enforcement in the United States
- Field-level encryption in databases
- Flair Airlines (ICAO airline code FLE), Canadian ULCC discount airline
- FLE receiver, an East German spy radio
- Fleet railway station (station code FLE), Fleet, Hampshire, England, UK
- Football League of Europe
- Four Lane Ends Interchange, of the Tyne and Wear Metro
- Français langue étrangère (FLE, FLÉ), French as a foreign language
- Frontal lobe epilepsy
- FLE standard time (Finland, Lithuania/Latvia, Estonia time) - see Eastern European Time

== See also ==
- Fles (disambiguation)
- F1E (disambiguation)
- FIE (disambiguation)
