= FEIS =

FEIS or Feis may refer to:

- Feis, a traditional Gaelic arts and culture festival
- Fellow of the Educational Institute of Scotland
- Herbert Feis (1893–1972), American historian
- Feis (rapper) (1986–2019), Dutch rapper

== See also ==
- FEI (disambiguation)
