= Bengaluru Space Expo =

- Bengaluru Space Expo logo

- Inauguration of 9th Bengaluru Space Expo (2026)

- Location inside the Indian state of Karnataka Bengaluru Space Expo (Karnataka)
- Venue: Bangalore International Exhibition Centre
- Location: 13.060919°N 77.47683°E
- Also known as: BSX
- Type: Exhibitions, conferences
- Theme: Harnessing space for global progress: Innovation, policy, and growth
- Organised by: ISRO, IN-SPACe, NSIL, CII,
- Participants: 20+ countries
- Website: bsxindia.com

Bengaluru Space Expo is an international exhibition and conference related to space, held biennially at BIEC.

Bengaluru Space Expo is an UFI approved event and is organized by ISRO, IN-SPACe, NSIL, CII

== Event(s) ==
The first event was held from 29 November to 1 December 2008. The 9th edition was held from 7 to 9 September 2026.

== Media gallery ==
9th Bengaluru Space Expo (2026)
ISRO

Jindal Quanta

Italia pavilion

Schott AG

== See also ==
- Bengaluru Tech Summit

== External sources ==
- Official website of Bengaluru Space Expo
