= FTZ (disambiguation) =

FTZ stands for Free trade zone. It may also refer to:

- Foreign trade zone
- FTZ 1 TR 6, German national digital signalling protocol formerly used for ISDN
- ftz instability element; see FIE3 (ftz instability element 3') element
- Flush-to-zero; see Denormal number
- Fushi tarazu; see Pair-rule gene
- Nikon FTZ (F-to-Z) and FTZ II, Nikon lens adapters allowing Nikon F-mount lenses to be used on Nikon Z-mount cameras
