= IMTEX =

- Logo of IMTEX

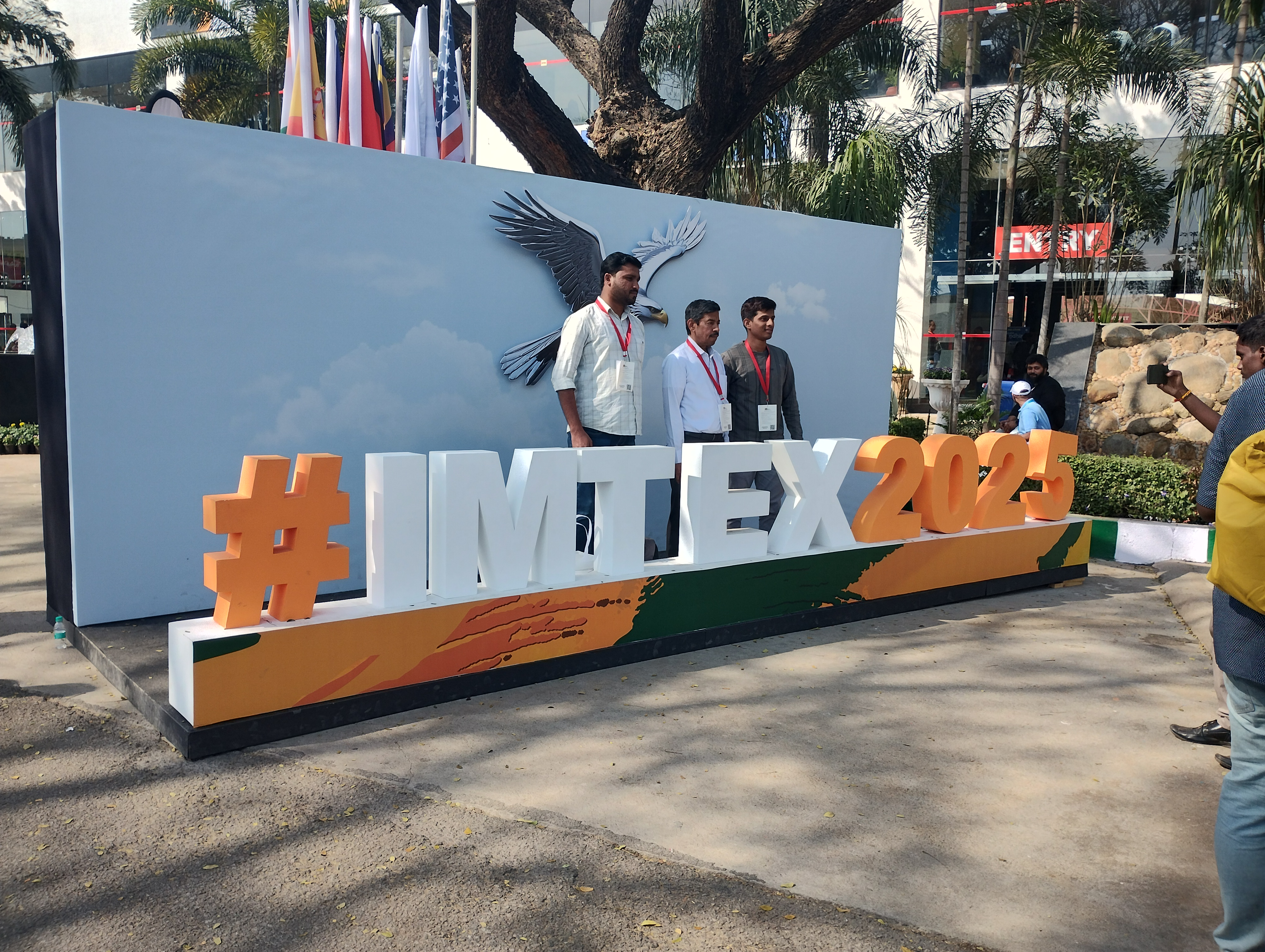
- IMTEX 2025 signboard

- Location of the event IMTEX (India)
- Time: (+5:30)
- Duration: 6 days (as per 2025 event)
- Venue: Madavara, Bengaluru
- Location: BIEC, Bengaluru; 13.060919°N 77.47683°E
- Type: Exhibitions, conferences
- Target: Machine tool & manufacturing industry
- Organised by: Indian Machine Tool Manufacturers' Association (IMTMA)
- Participants: 23 countries; 1183 exhibitors
- Website: www.imtex.in

IMTEX (International Machine Tool & Manufacturing Technology Exhibition) is South and South-East Asia's largest machine tool and manufacturing show held annually at BIEC.

It is organized by Indian Machine Tool Manufacturers' Association.

== Event(s) ==
- IMTEX, Tooltech & Digital Manufacturing 2027
- IMTEX FORMING 2026
- IMTEX (Retrospect) Tooltech & Digital Manufacturing 2025

== Media gallery ==
IMTEX 2025
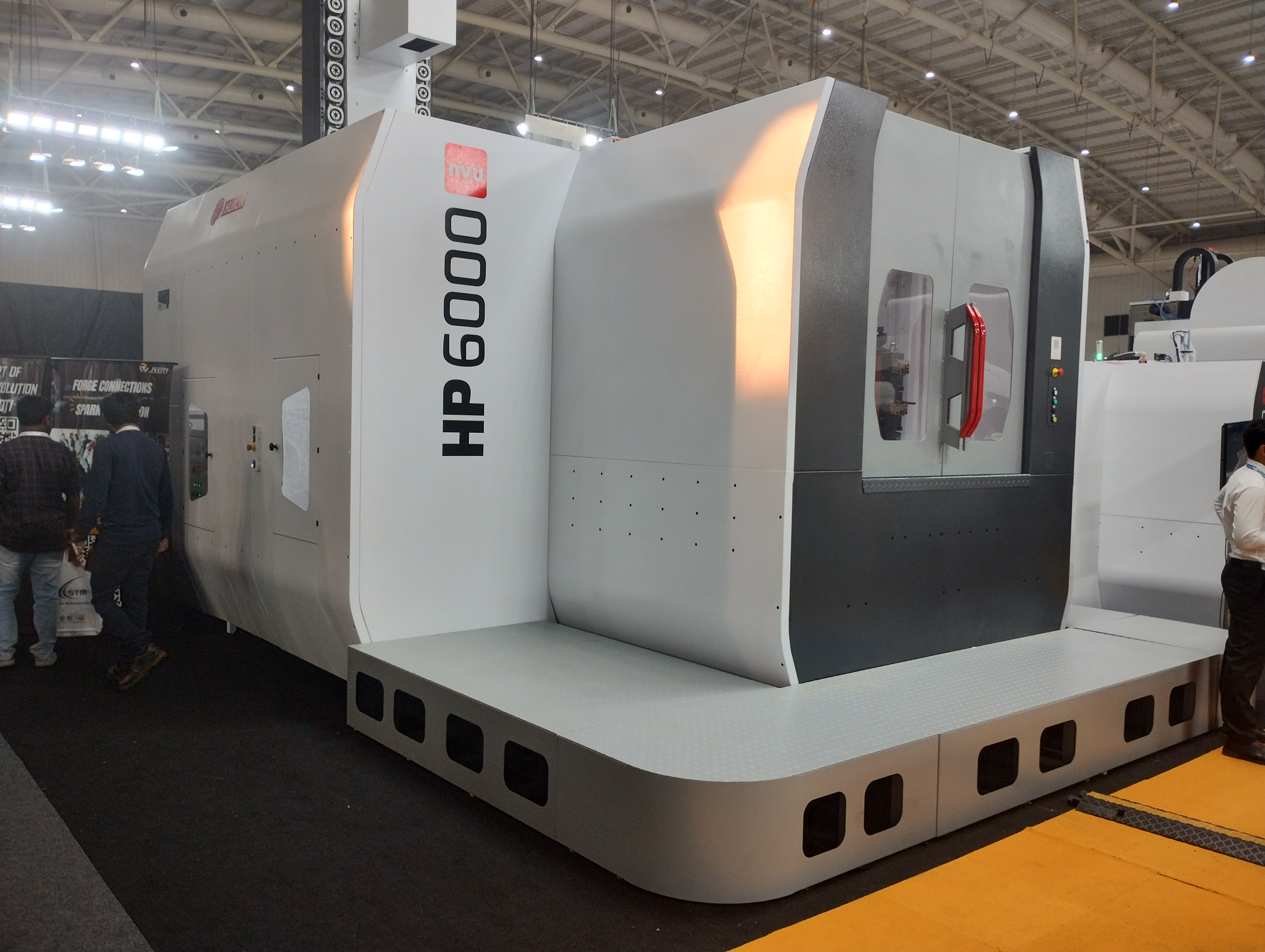

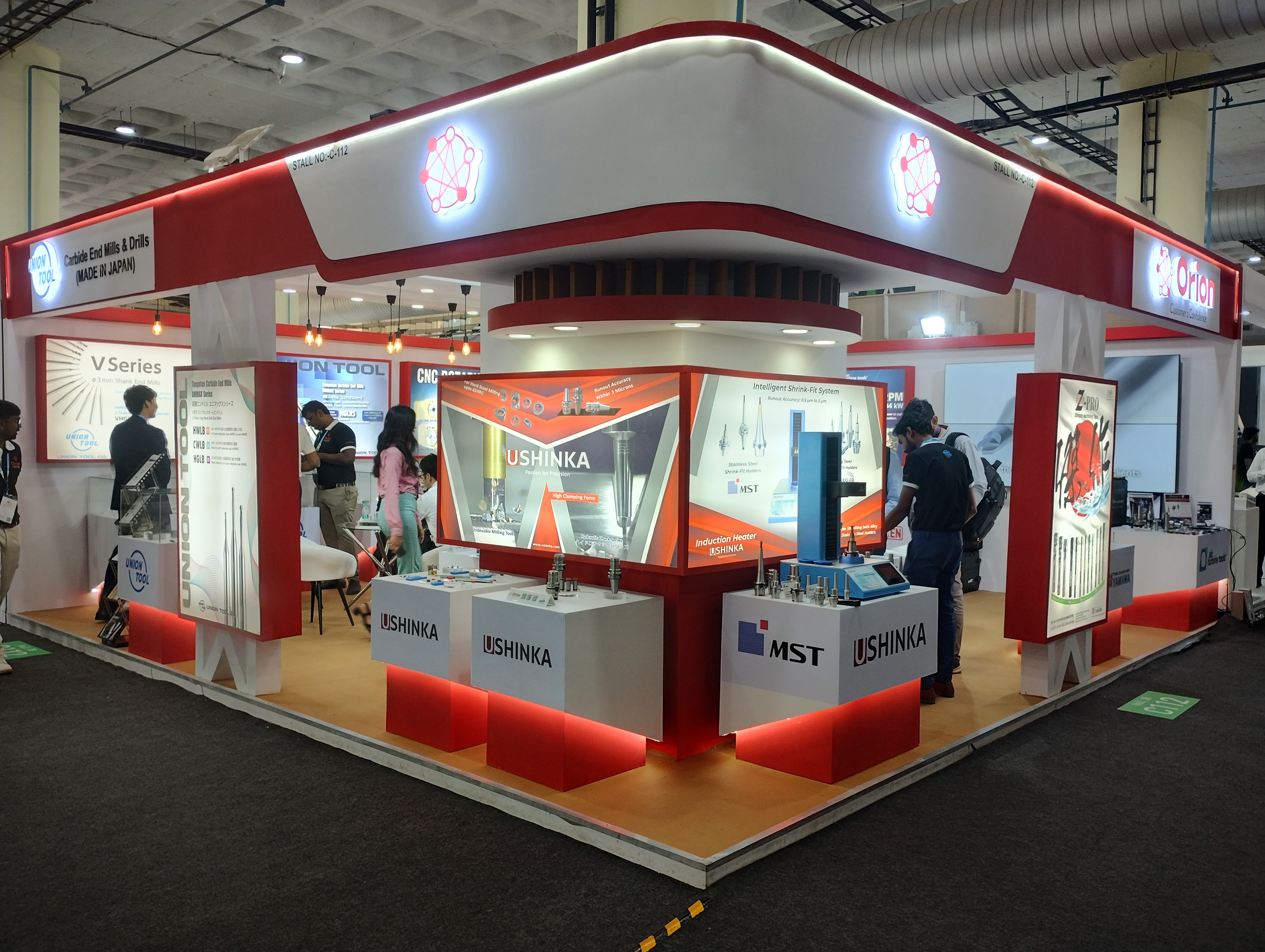

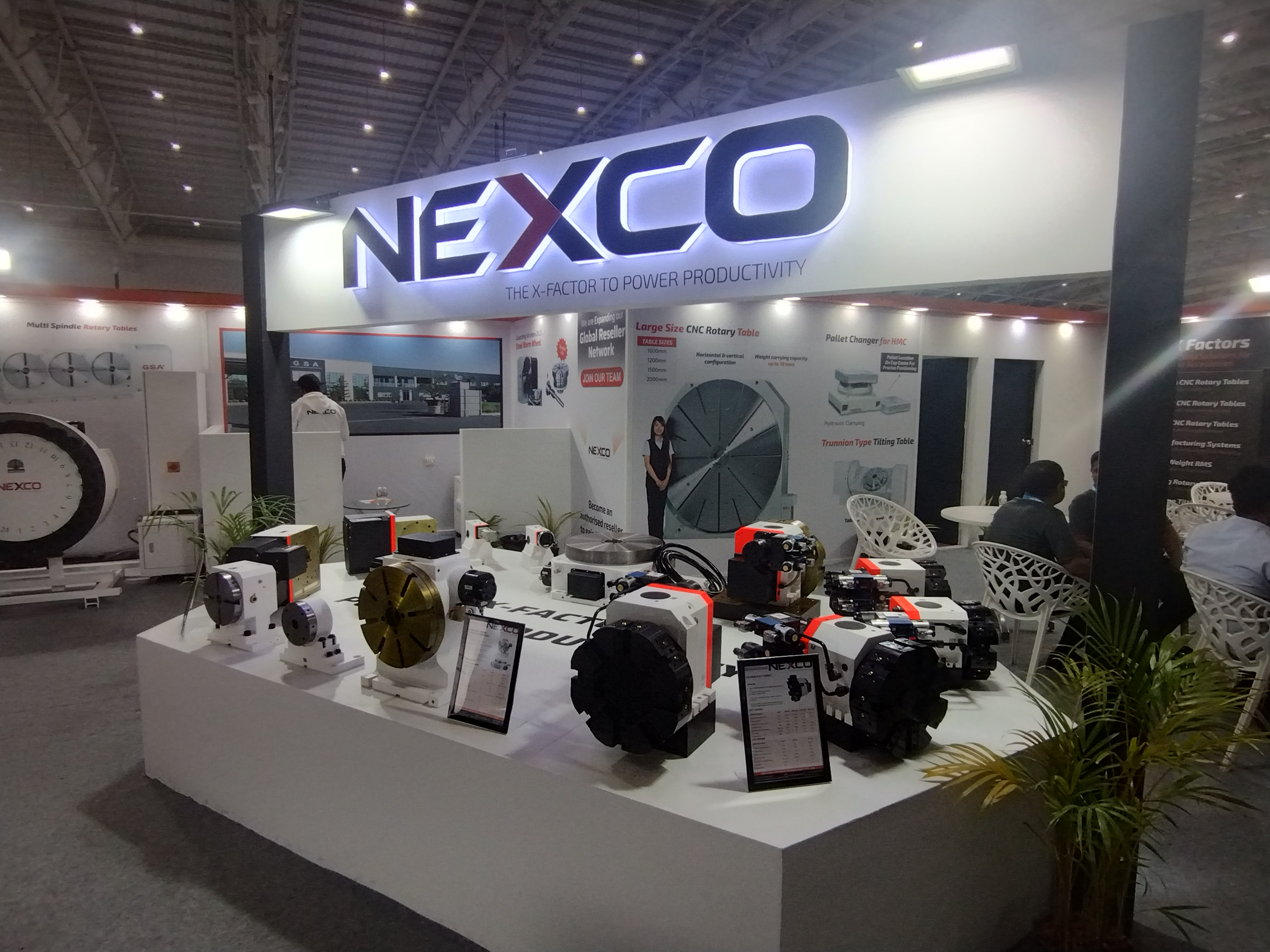

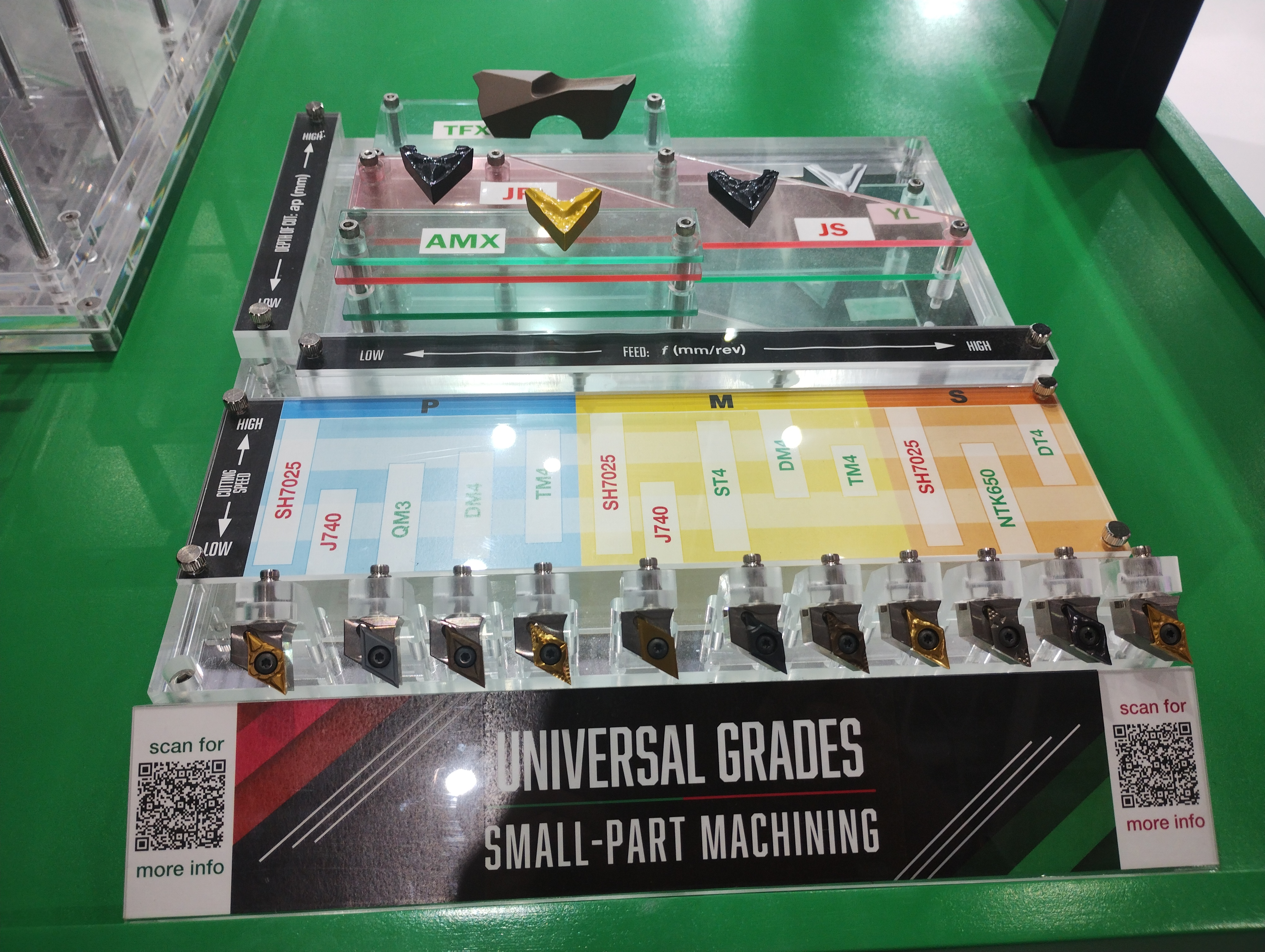

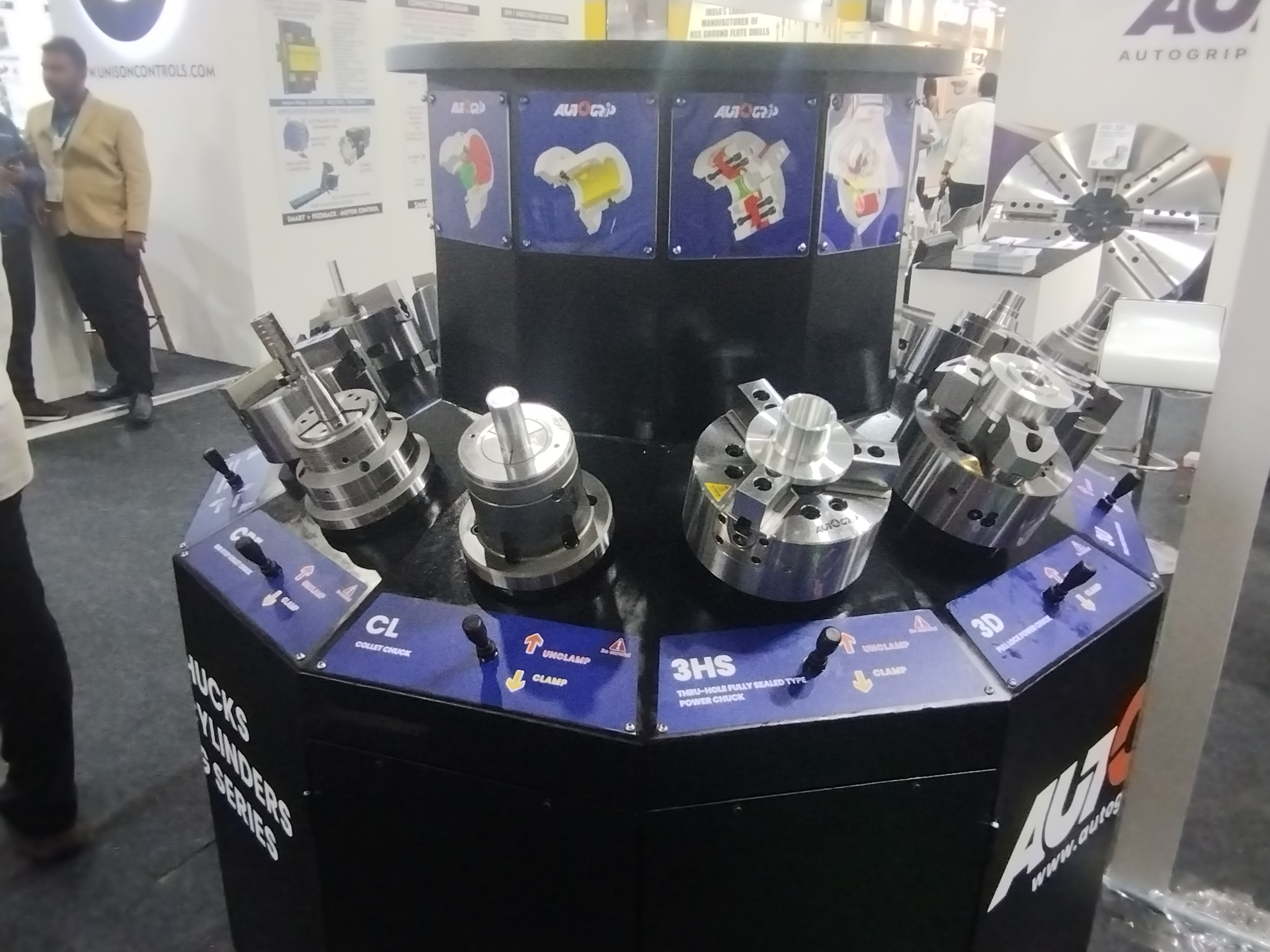

== See also ==
- EXCON, South Asia's largest trade fair
