= FEI =

Fei or FEI may refer to:

== Places ==
- Fei County, in Shandong, China

== People ==
- Fei (surname) (费), a Chinese surname and given name
- Fei (singer), stage name of Chinese singer, actress, presenter and model Wang Feifei (born 1987)

== Organizations ==
- Centro Universitário da FEI, a university in Brazil
- Falange Española Independiente, a defunct Spanish political party
- Federal Executive Institute, an American government executive learning institute
- Financial Executives International, an American organization for senior-level financial executives
- International Federation for Equestrian Sports (French: Fédération Équestre Internationale)
- Italian Esperanto Federation (Italian: Federazione Esperantista Italiana)

== Other uses ==
- Fei (letter) in the Hebrew alphabet
- Battle of Fei (disambiguation)
- FEI Company, an American scientific instrumentation company
- Special Independent Prosecutor (Spanish: Fiscal Especial Independiente), in Puerto Rico

== See also ==
- FI (disambiguation)
- Fie (disambiguation)
