= FIE Foundation =

Indian charity

- Formation: 1970
- Type: NGO
- Legal status: Charitable Trust
- Headquarters: Ichalkaranji
- Coordinates: 16.7°N 74.47°E
- Region served: India
- Chairman of the Trust: Pandit Daji Kulkarni
- Parent organization: FIE group of Industries.
- Website: fiefoundation.org

FIE Foundation is a charity trust established in 1970. It belongs to FIE (Fuel Instruments and Engineers) Group of Industries, located in Ichalkaranji, Maharashtra, India.

== Background ==
P. D. (Panditkaka Daji) Kulkarni, chairman and trustee of FIE Group, established the FIE Foundation trust to recognize and award eminent and emerging personalities of India in different fields for their contribution to the nation and society. The award winners are generally selected from industries including engineering, science and technology, humanities, education, agriculture, music and arts, sports, literature, child artists, and local talents.

The highest award conferred is Rashtrabhushan Award. The awards are given yearly in a ceremony held in Ichalkaranji in January or February. Guests have included Prime Minister of India Chandra Shekhar, Chief Minister of Maharashtra Manohar Joshi, actor Dilip Kumar, and industrialist Rahul Bajaj.

== Rashtrabhushan Awardees ==
Sumant Moolgaokar (Architect of Tata Motor), Jayant Narlikar, S. L. Kirloskar, Krishnaswami Kasturirangan, Dr. Raja Ramanna, Russy Modi, Navalmal Firodiya, Aditya Birla, Ratan Tata, Rahul Bajaj, H. P. Nanda, Jayaprakash Narayan, Baba Amte, Lata Mangeshkar, Tarkteerth Laxmanshastri Joshi, Nanasaheb Gore, Ashok Kumar, T. N. Seshan, Keshub Mahindra, Dr. R. N. Dandekar, Pandurang Shastri Athavale, B. R. Chopra, Kamal Haasan, Narayan Murthy, Hema Malini, Dr. Sudha Murthy (Infosys Foundation chairperson), Rajeev Bajaj, Ramoji Rao, Brijmohan Munjal

== National Awardees ==
- Byron Damania ( high speed indigenous spindle 60,000rpm)
- Kapil Dev ( Sports)
- Shriram Bhavsar (sports)
- Rajdeep Sardesai (Journalism)
- Vinita Singhania (Industry)
- Vasant Purushottam Kale (Literature)
- Shobhaa De (Writer)
- Siddharth Kak (T.V. Personality)
- Yash Pal
- Byron Damania ( CNC Controller)
- S. D. Kulkarni (Industry)
- S. K. Mohanty (Language Technology)
- Veerendra Heggade (Education)
- Naresh Goyal (Engineering)
- Mallika Sarabhai (Performing Arts)
- Nana Chudasama (Social )
- Vitthal Kamat (Industry)
- Nilu Phule (Arts)
- Veena Patil (Industry)

== IMTEX Awards ==
IMTEX is an International Machine Tool Exhibition organised every three years by the Indian Machine Tool Manufacturing Association of India, during which awards are presented for latest technical innovations in machine tools. In 2009, ALFA SYSTEMS PVT LTD was granted the award.
