= Bangalore International Exhibition Centre =

International exhibition centre in Bangalore, India

- Logo of BIEC

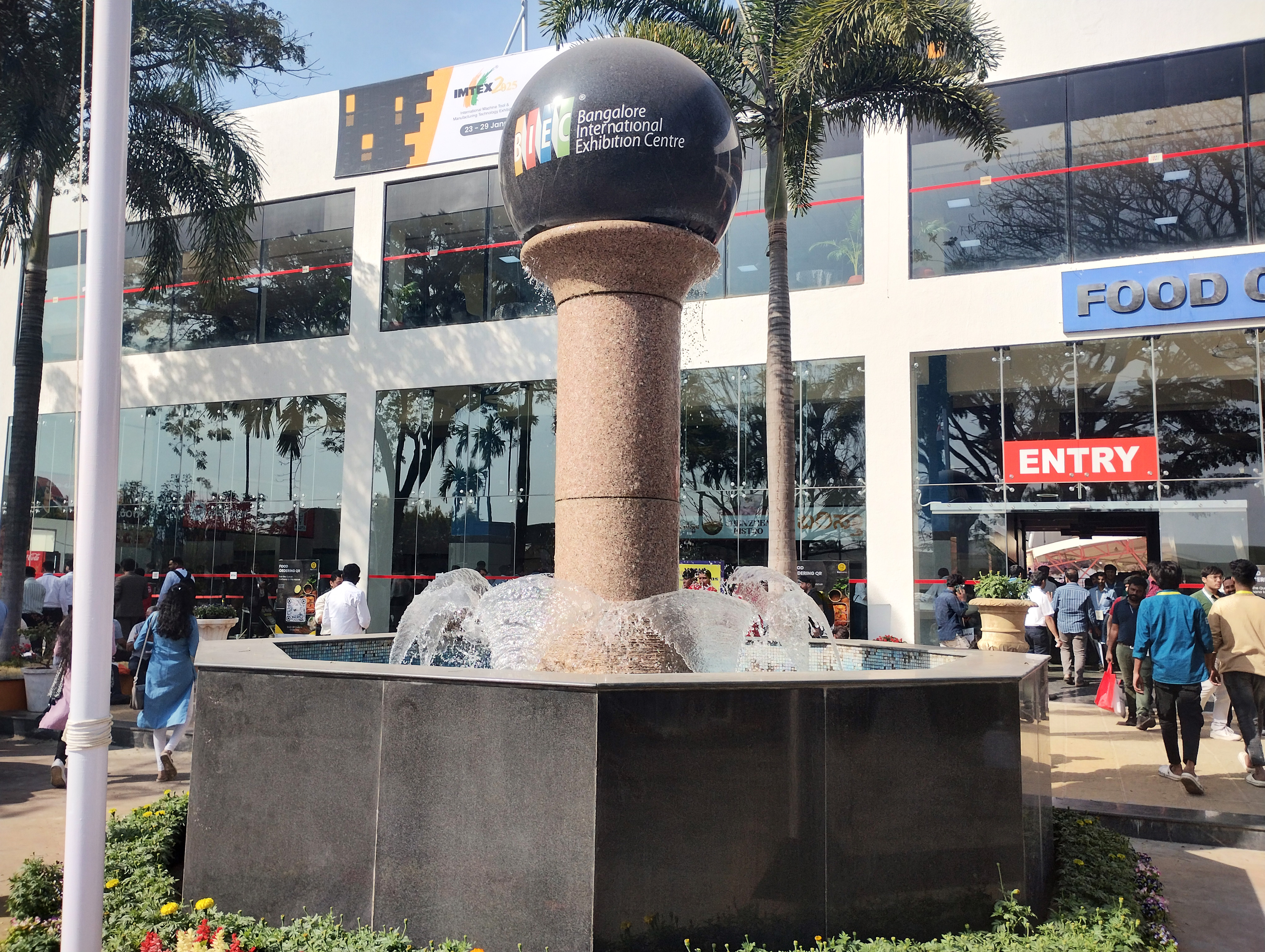
- BIEC in 2025

- Location within Asia Location within India
- Address: 10th mile, Tumkur Road, Bengaluru 562162; Bangalore; India
- Location: Karnataka, India
- Coordinates: 13°03′21.25″N 77°28′31.43″E
- Owner: Indian Machine Tool Manufacturers' Association (IMTMA)
- Operator: Indian Machine Tool Manufacturers' Association (IMTMA)
- Type: Exhibition venue
- Field shape: Oval
- Current use: Exhibitions, conferences, B2B sessions etc.
- Public transit: Madavara metro station Madavara bus stop
- Parking: 10000 vehicles

Construction
- Built: 2007
- Opened: 2007

Website
- biec.in

Bangalore International Exhibition Centre (BIEC) is located in Tumkur Road, Bengaluru, Karnataka, India. It is run by Indian Machine Tool Manufacturers' Association.

This centre is India’s first LEED-certified green facility for exhibitions, conferences, B2B events. Since 2007, BIEC has hosted more than 400 events (including many national and international).

== Media gallery ==
Exhibitions at BIEC in 2025
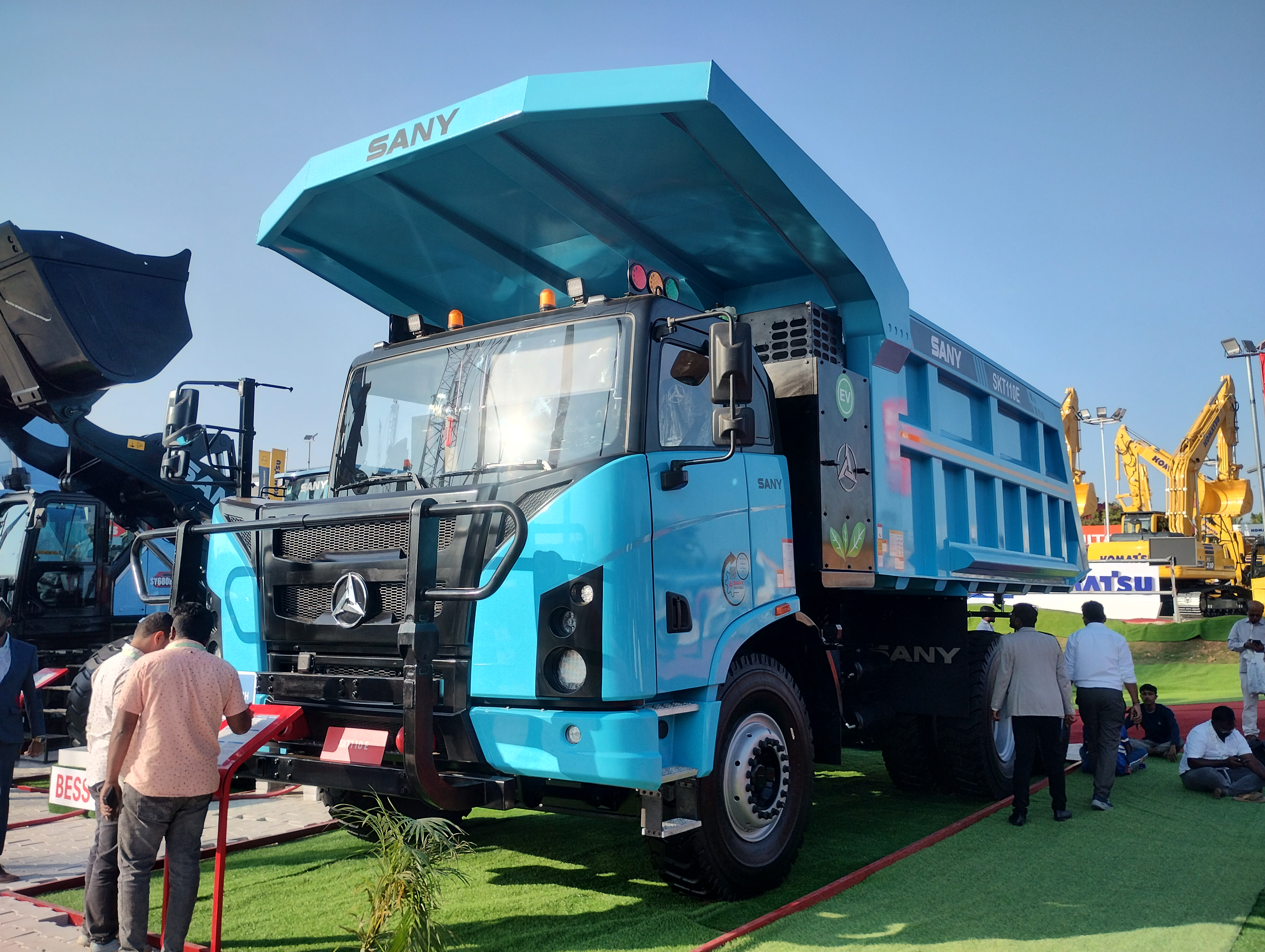
EXCON 2025

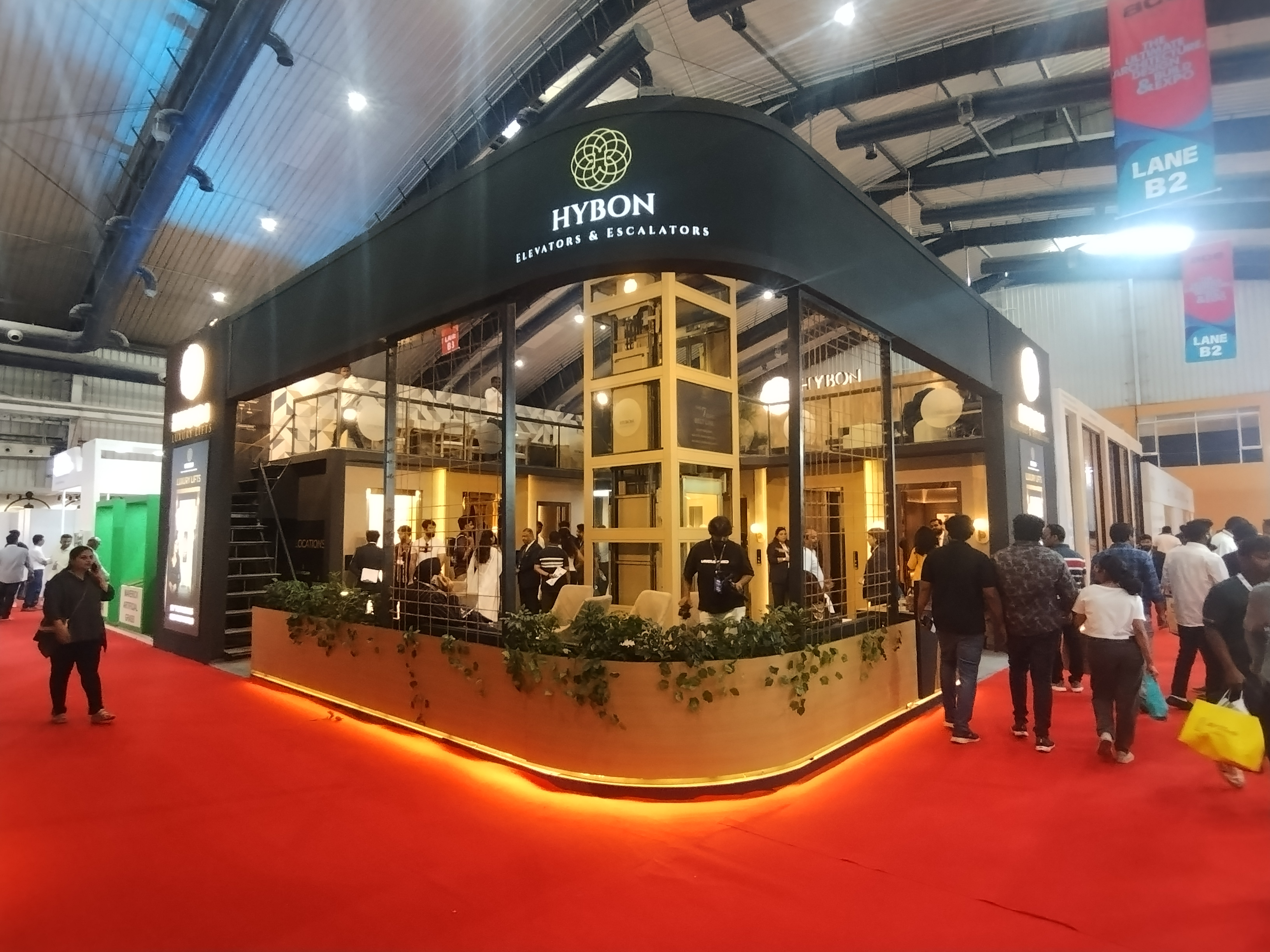
Acetech 2025

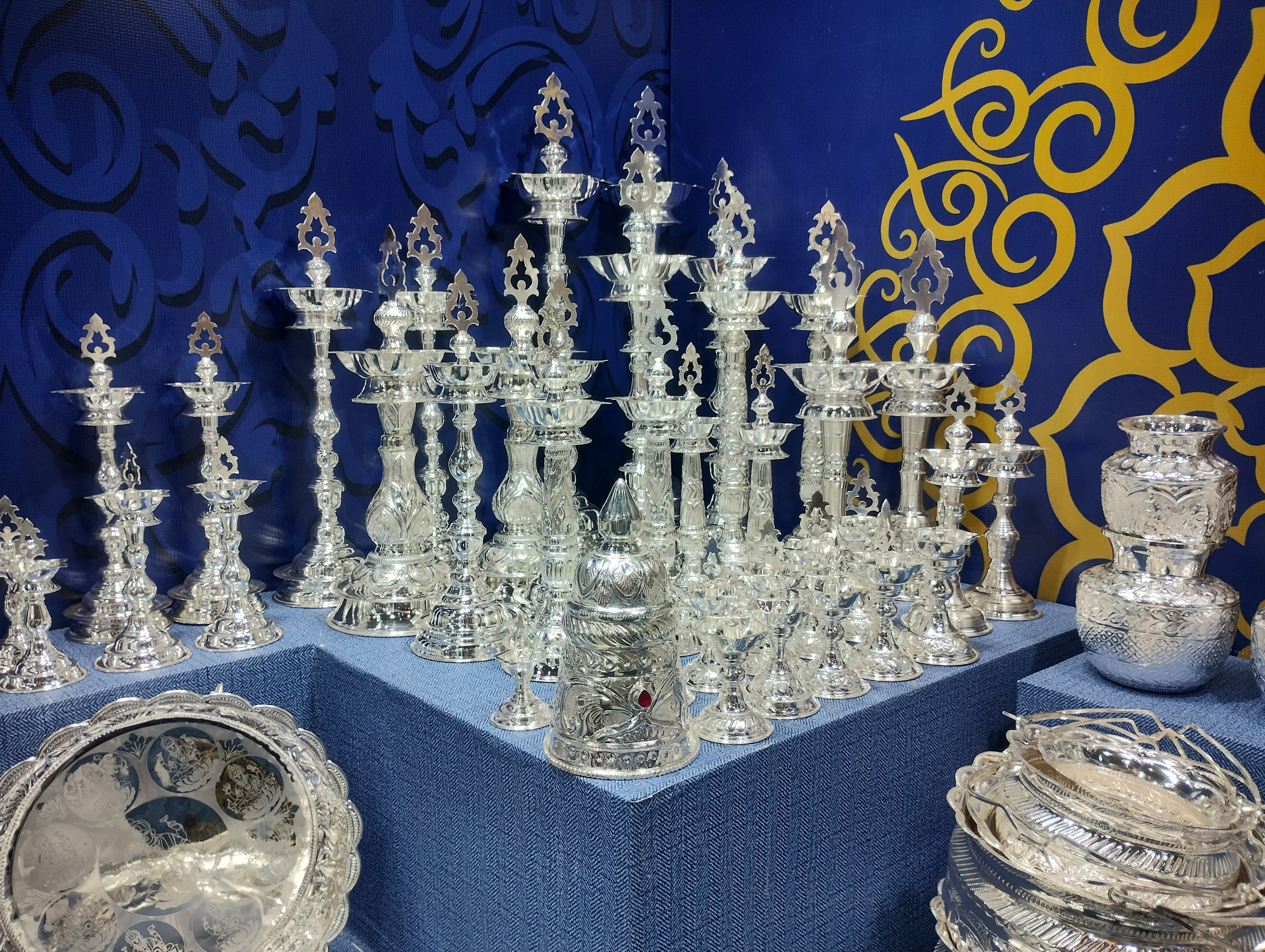
5th Silver Show of India 2025

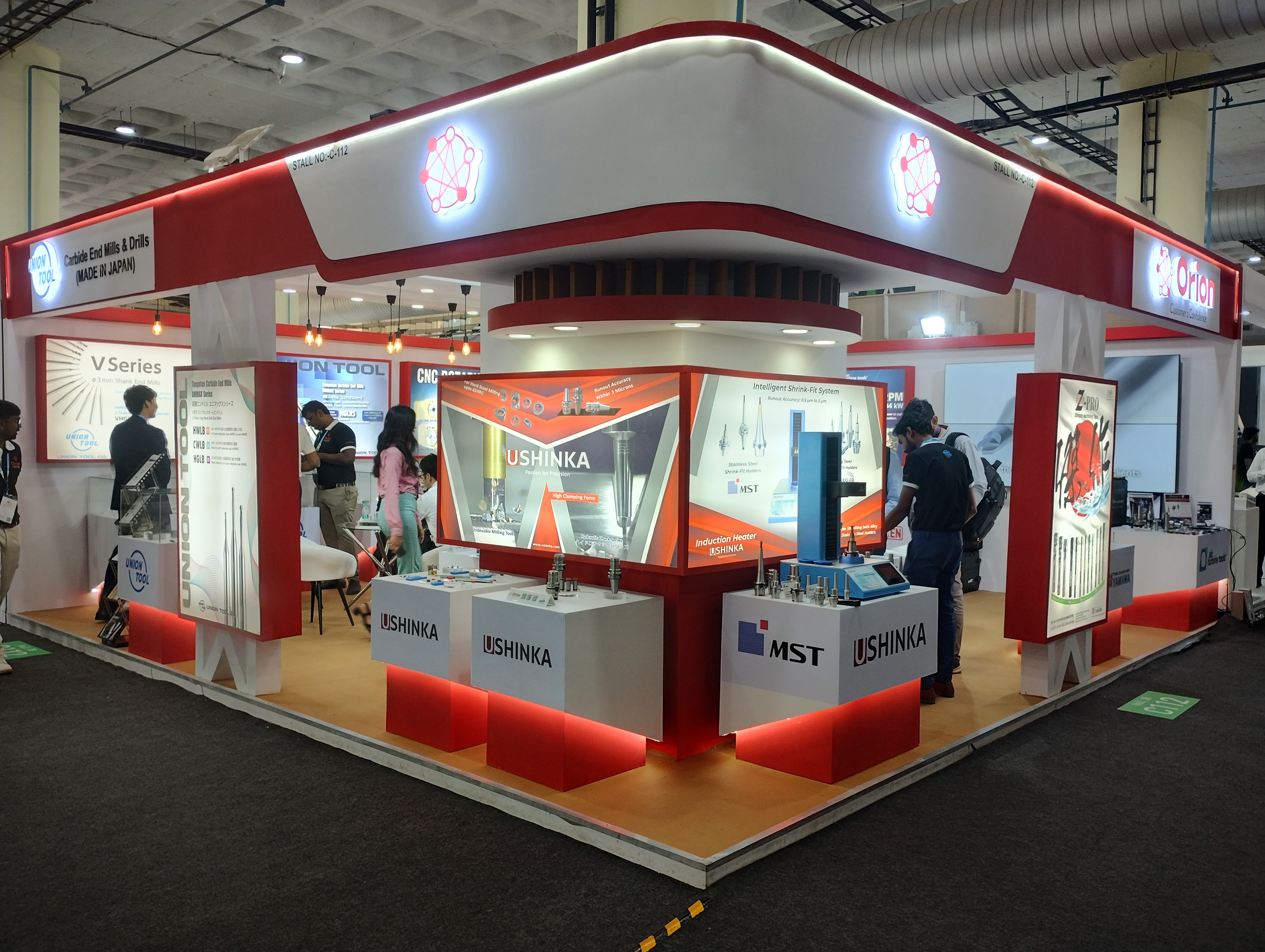
IMTEX 2025
BIEC in 2025
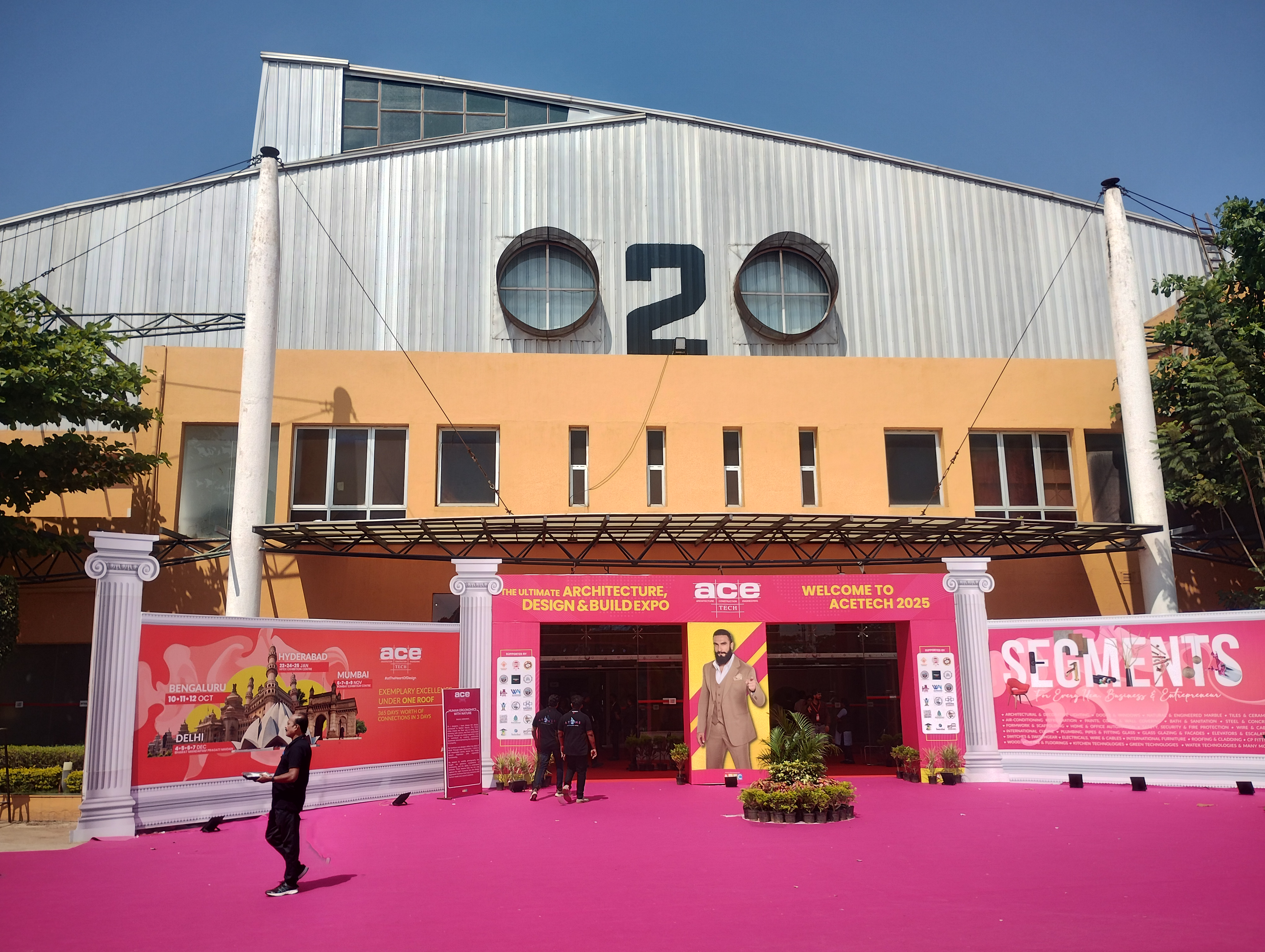
Exhibition halls at BIEC

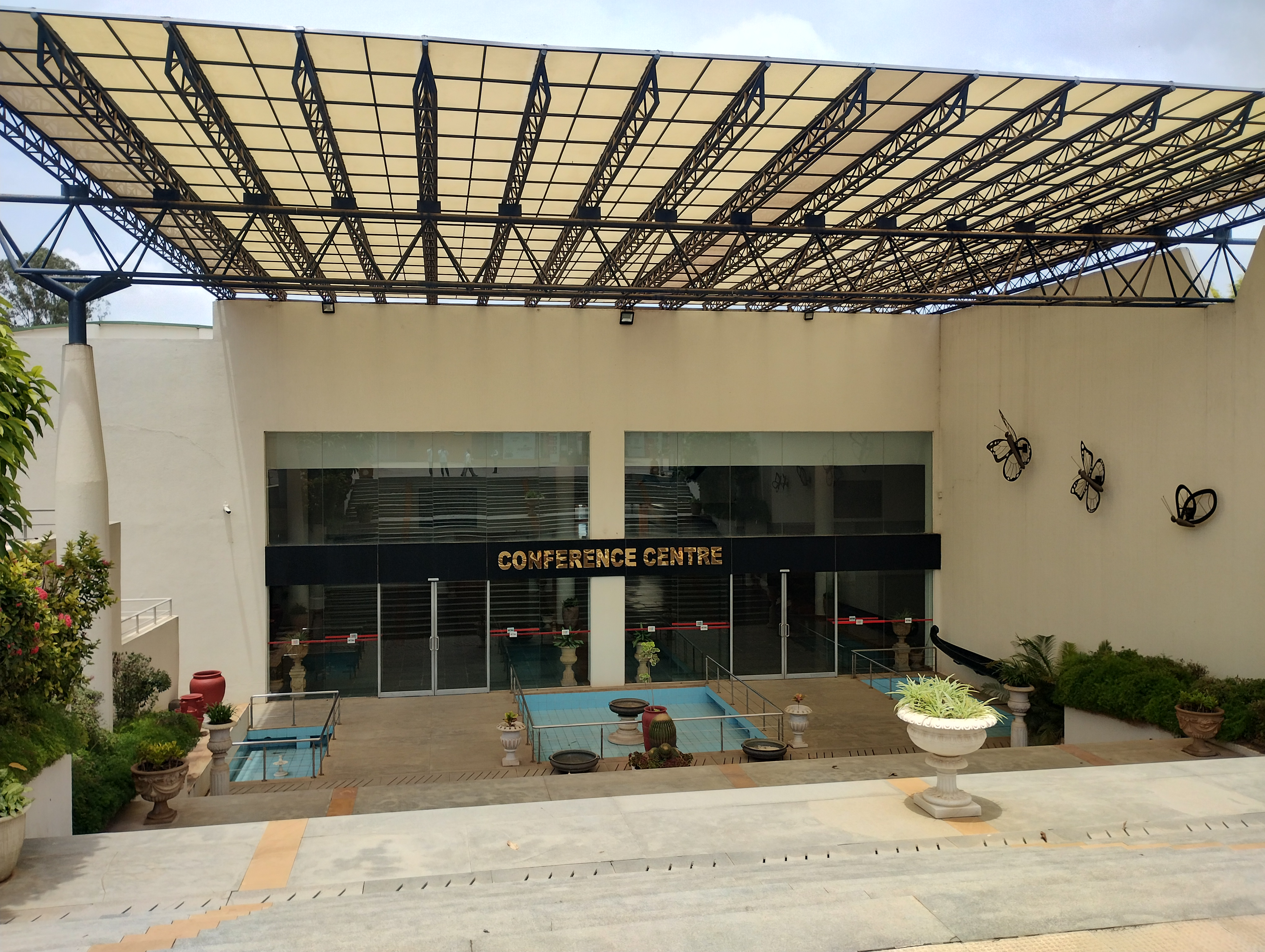
Conference centers at BIEC

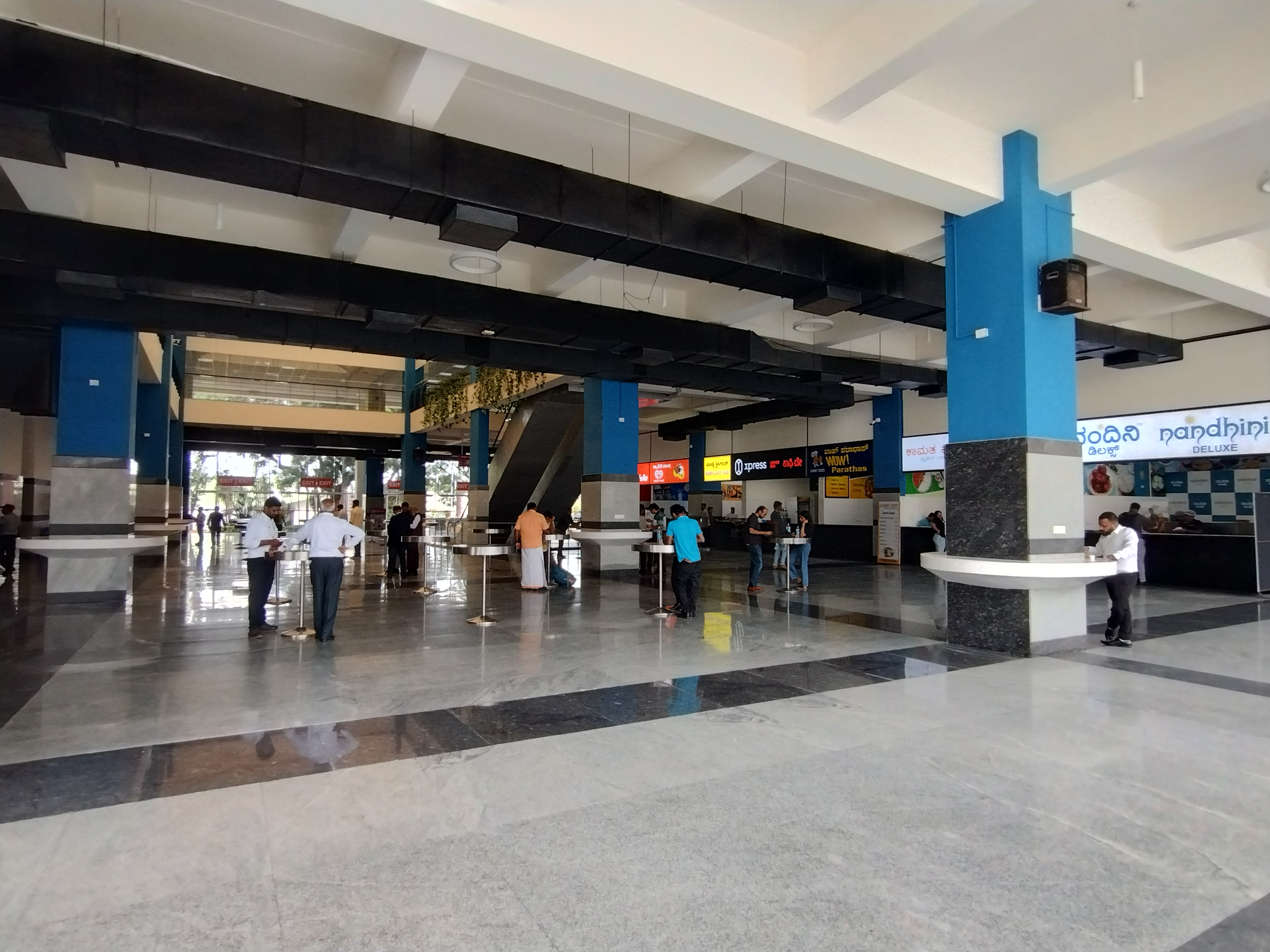
Food courts at BIEC

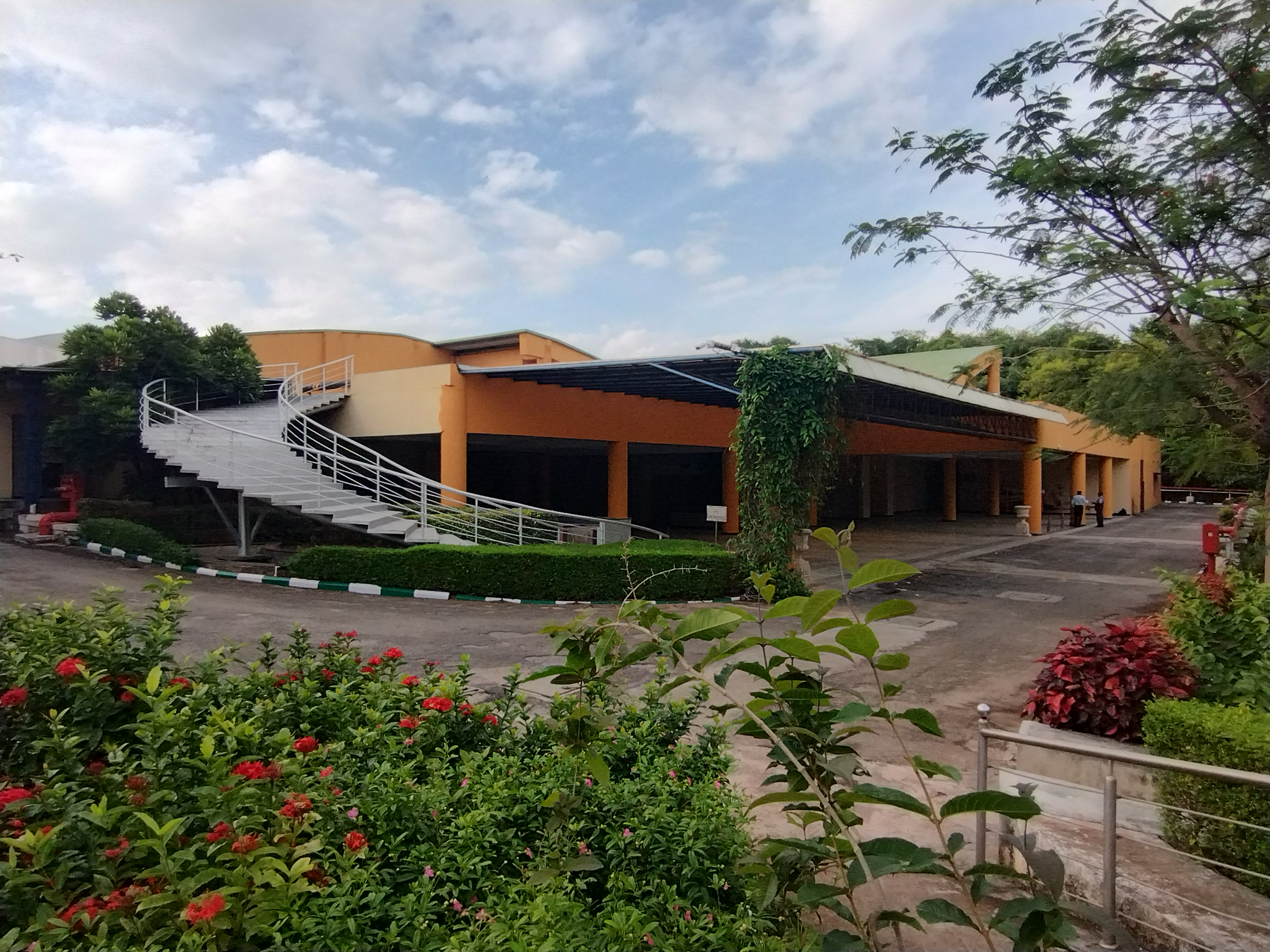
Flora and interiors of BIEC

== Exhibitions list ==
=== 2026 ===
Levis Show (January 15 - 17) (Invitees only); IMTEX FORMING 2026 / Tooltech 2026 (January 21 - 25); Moldex and Fastnex India (January 21 - 25); Smart Lift and Mobility World Expo 2026 (February 5 - 7); INDEXPLUS (February 6 - 8); Herbalife Future Business Builders (February 17); Indian Surface Finishing (February 18 - 20); Mattress Tech Expo (February 26 - March 01); Indiawood (February 26 - March 02); India International Jewellery Show (March 21 - 23); India Automation & Robotics Expo, Warehouse Logistic & Material Handling Expo, India Information Technology Expo, Cyber Security Expo (April 6- 8); Smart Home & Office Expo, Interior and Décor Expo, Cable & Wire Expo (April 6- 8); Target India Annual Meet (April 9); HYROX - Fitness Shaping Event (April 10 - 12); India Paint & Coating Expo, Doors Windows & Facades Expo (April 13- 15); Print and Packaging Expo, Label and Bar Code Expo, Paper India Expo (April 13- 15); Plumbex India (April 16 - 18); Drone Expo & Conference (April 17 - 18); Roof India (Apr 23 - 25); Herbalife Extravaganza (April 23 - 25); Zak Fenestration India Expo (April 28 - 30); Agarbatti & Perfume Expo 2026 (May 9 - 10); ELASIA (May 14 - 17); Renewable Asia 2026 / EV (May 14 - 17); Asia Labex (May 27 - 29); India Tea & Coffee, Dairy, Poultry & Food Expo (Jun 11 - 13); Herbalife Future Business Builders (June 20); D-arc Build 2026 (June 26 - 28); Google I/O Connect (July 14) (Pre-approved registrations only); ELCINA Defence and Aerospace SES (15th Strategic Electronics Summit) (July 23 - 24); Levis Show (July 23-25) (Invitees only); India Green Energy Expo/ Green Vehicle Expo (July 29 - 31); Symposium on Automation & Robotics (Aug 13 - 14); Franchise India (Aug 22 - 23); India Med Expo (Sep 5 - 7); Bengaluru Space Expo (Sep 7 - 9); Electronica- Productronica (Sep 16 - 18); Laser World of Photonics (Sep 16 - 18); HBLF Show (Sep 25 - 27); Expodent (Sep 25 - 27); AgriCon India (Oct 1 - 3); Acetech (Oct 9 - 11); Herbalife Future Business Builders (Oct 23); Hindustan International Furniture Fair (Oct 24 - 26); Bengaluru Tech Summit 2026 (Nov 17 - 19); Didac India 2026 & Didac Skills 2026 (Nov 25 - 27); Indus Food Regional (South) (Nov 25 - 27); Udyami Bharath (Dec 4 - 6); Print & Pack Tech Expo 2026 (Dec 19 - 20)

=== 2025 ===
Exhibitions in BIEC in 2025

Microsoft AI Tour (January 7, 2025); Pharmatech and Labtech Expo (January 8 - 10, 2025); Levis Show (January 11 - 17, 2025) (Invitees only); IMTEX, Tooltech & Digital Manufacturing 2025 (January 23 - 29, 2025); Apparel Manufacturing of India (February 5 - 7, 2025); STONA (February 12 - 15, 2025); ACREX India 2025 (February 20 - 22, 2025); MATECIA (February 21 - 23, 2025); Karnataka International Travel Expo (February 27 - 28, 2025); IIJS Tritiya and IGJME Tritiya 2025 (March 21 - 24, 2025); Herbalife Future Business Builders (28 March 2025); Doors Windows and Facades Expo (April 10 - 12, 2025); India Paint and Coating Expo (April 10 - 12, 2025); Target in India Annual Meeting (TIIAM) (April 10, 2025); Herbalife Extravaganza (April 18 - 20, 2025); Bharat Print Expo 2025 (April 24 - 26, 2025); Salesforce Hackathon (April 29 - 30, 2025); Salesforce - TrailheaDX India 2025 (May 2 - 3, 2025); PLASTASIA (4)- IDMEX (5) (May 9 - 12, 2025); Green Vehicle Expo (May 22 - 24, 2025); Bharat Drone Stack Conference 2025 (June 5 - 6, 2025); Asia Lab Expo (June 11 - 13, 2025); Poultry Expo (June 12 - 14, 2025); Food Expo (June 12 - 14, 2025); Dairy Expo (June 12 - 14, 2025); Bakery and Kitchen Equipment Expo (June 12 - 14, 2025); India Green Energy Expo (June 19 - 21, 2025); D-arc Build 2025 (June 20 - 22, 2025); Herbalife Future Business Builders (June 26, 2025); Tata Small Commercial Vehicle Test Drive Expo (June 27 - 28, 2025); Silver Show of India - Gold (June 28 - 30, 2025); Levis Show (July 09 - 11, 2025) (Invitees only); Google IO Connect (July 23, 2025) (Pre-approved registrations only); Google Hackathon (July 26 - 27, 2025) (Pre-approved registrations only); Agritech (August 1 - 3, 2025); Elcina (August 7 - 8, 2025); FREX: Franchise - Retail - Scale (August 30 - 31, 2025); Expodent (September 5 - 7, 2025); Electronica India (September 17 - 19, 2025); Laser World of Photonics (September 17 - 19, 2025); Horti Connect (September 25 - 27, 2025); Herbalife Spectacular (September 26 - 28, 2025); Acetech (October 10 - 12, 2025); Herbalife Future Business Builders (October 28, 2025); India Manufacturing Show (November 6 - 8, 2025); Bengaluru Tech Summit (November 18 - 20, 2025); HGH India (November 25 - 28, 2025); SAP TechEd (November 25 - 26, 2025); Excon (December 9 - 13, 2025); Green Energy India Expo (December 16 - 18, 2025); Indian Pharma Congress (December 19 - 21, 2025); Silver Show of India (December 26 - 29, 2025)

== See also ==
- KTPO Exhibition and Convention Centre, Bangalore
