= Bengaluru Tech Summit =

Indian technology exhibition

- Bengaluru Tech Summit logo

- Location of event Bengaluru Tech Summit (India)
- Time: (+5:30)
- Venue: Bangalore International Exhibition Centre (from 2025)
- Location: Maadavara, Bengaluru; 13°03′21.25″N 77°28′31.43″E
- Also known as: BTS
- Type: Exhibitions, conferences etc.
- Target: Entrepreneurs, investors, academics, tech enthusiasts etc.
- Organised by: Government of Karnataka; Karnataka Innovation and Technology Society (KITS); Software Technology Parks of India (STPI); Vision Groups on (Information Technology, Biotechnology, StartUp & Space); MM Activ Sci-Tech Communications
- Participants: 75+ countries; 1,600+ exhibitors (incl. 175+ international exhibitors)
- Website: www.bengalurutechsummit.com

Bengaluru Tech Summit or previously Bangalore IT.in is an international technology exhibition held yearly, in India. It is held annually sometime between October and December in Bangalore International Exhibition Centre and Palace grounds, Bengaluru, Karnataka, India.

The name of this event was changed from BangaloreIT.com to BangaloreIT.in starting with the 2005 edition. In 2018, it was renamed to Bengaluru tech summit. The event is an initiative of the Department of IT & Biotechnology of the State Government of Karnataka, India.

The event is supported by Indian trade consortiums such as the National Association of Software and Services Companies, and government bodies such as the Software Technology Parks of India.

== Events ==
The 28th edition of the event was held at Bangalore International Exhibition Centre, from 18 to 20 November 2025.

== See also ==
- Bengaluru Space Expo
