= Fles =

Fles or FLES may refer to:

== People ==
Three generations of a Jewish-Dutch-American family:

- Louis Fles, Dutch businessman and activist (father of Barthold Fles and George Fles)
  - Barthold Fles, Dutch-American literary agent (son of Louis Fles)
  - George Fles, Dutch victim of the Great Purge (son of Louis Fles, father of Michael John Fles)
    - Michael John Fles, American poet and musician (son of George Fles)

== Other uses ==
- De Koninklijke Porceleyne Fles, Dutch earthenware factory
- Language immersion, also known as Foreign Languages in Elementary Schools (FLES) program

== See also ==
- FLE (disambiguation)
