= F1E =

F1E or variant, may refer to:

== Aerospace ==
- North American F-1E Fury, a U.S. fighter plane
- Dassault Mirage F1E, a French fighter plane from Dassault, variant of the Mirage F1
- Falcon 1e (F1e), a proposed space launch rocket from SpaceX, a variant of the Falcon 1
- F1E, a competition sports class of flying model aircraft; see Free flight (model aircraft)

== Other uses ==
- Apricot Computers F1e, a personal computer
- F1e, a subgroup of Haplogroup F (mtDNA)

== See also ==
- F1 (disambiguation)
- E1F vacuum tube, an acorn tube
- FLE (disambiguation) and "fle", "Fle"
- FIE (disambiguation)
