= Silver Show of India =

Silver Show of India (SSI)
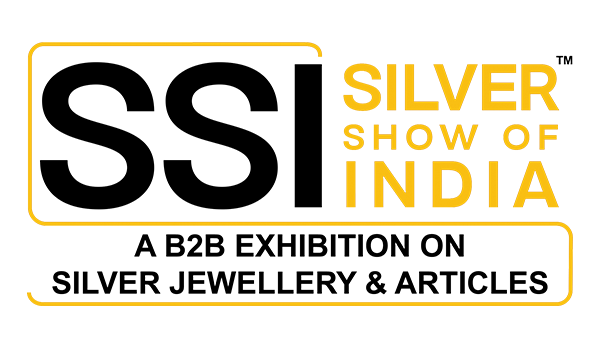
- Silver Show of India logo
- B2B exhibition on silver jewellery and articles, in India
- Country: India
- Location: New Delhi, Mumbai, Bangalore
- Organiser: GES Worldex India Pvt. Ltd.

Silver Show of India (SSI) is India's biggest silver specific B2B trade show, for silver jewellery manufacturers, wholesalers, retailers, designers, and allied industry stakeholders.

It is organized by GES Worldex India Pvt. Ltd.

== Past events ==
Dates	Location	Reference(s)
12 to 15 September 2024	New Delhi (Yashbhoomi, India International Convention & Expo Centre)	
6 to 9 September 2025	New Delhi (Yashbhoomi, India International Convention & Expo Centre)	
6 to 9 June 2025	Mumbai (Jio World Centre)	
26 to 29 December 2025	Bangalore (Bangalore International Exhibition Centre (BIEC))	

The 5th edition of the event was inaugurated by politician Santosh Lad, in Bangalore International Exhibition Centre, (BIEC).

== Media gallery ==
5th edition Silver Show of India, BIEC, Bangalore
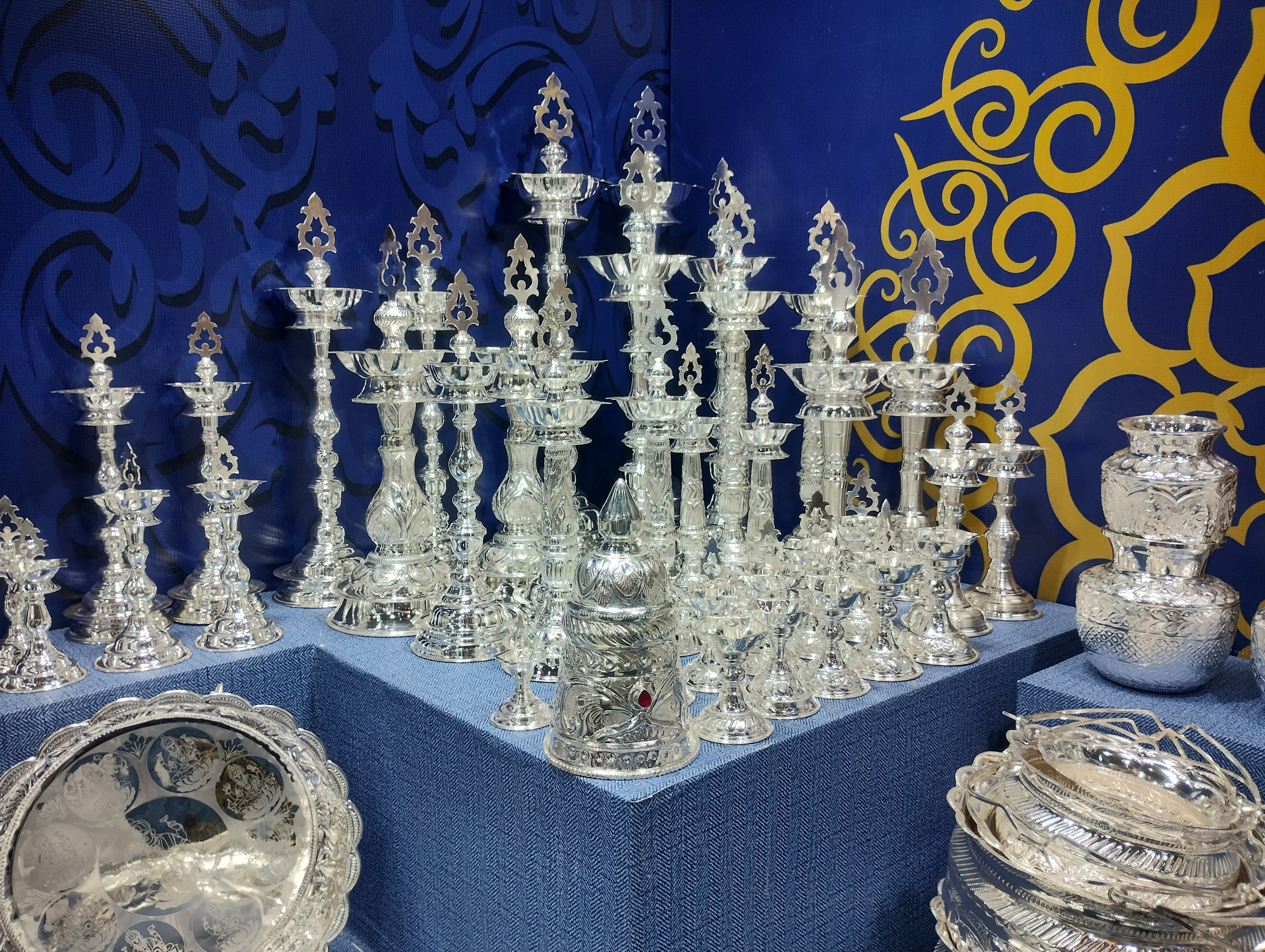
Silver ornaments

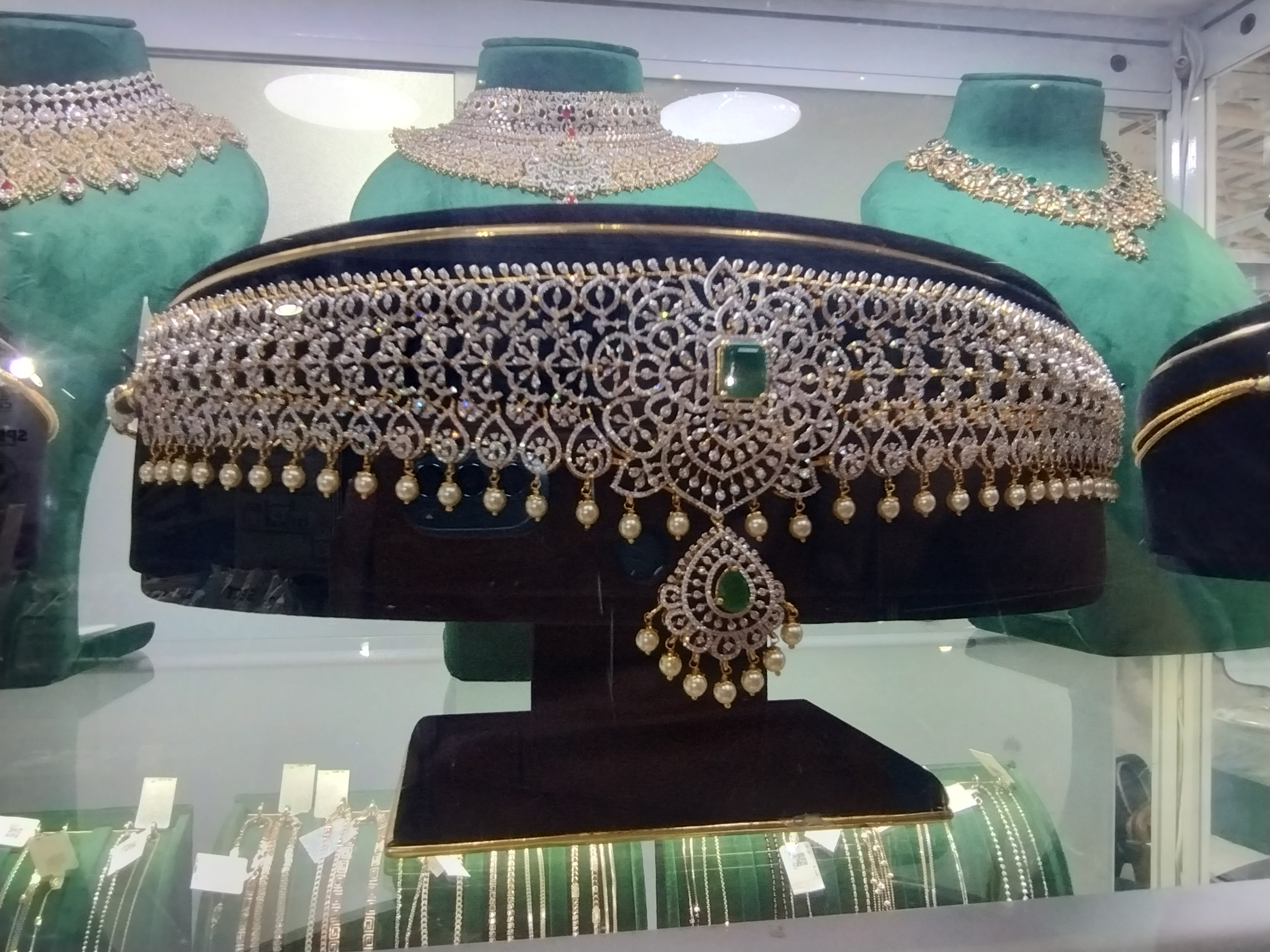
Silver ornaments

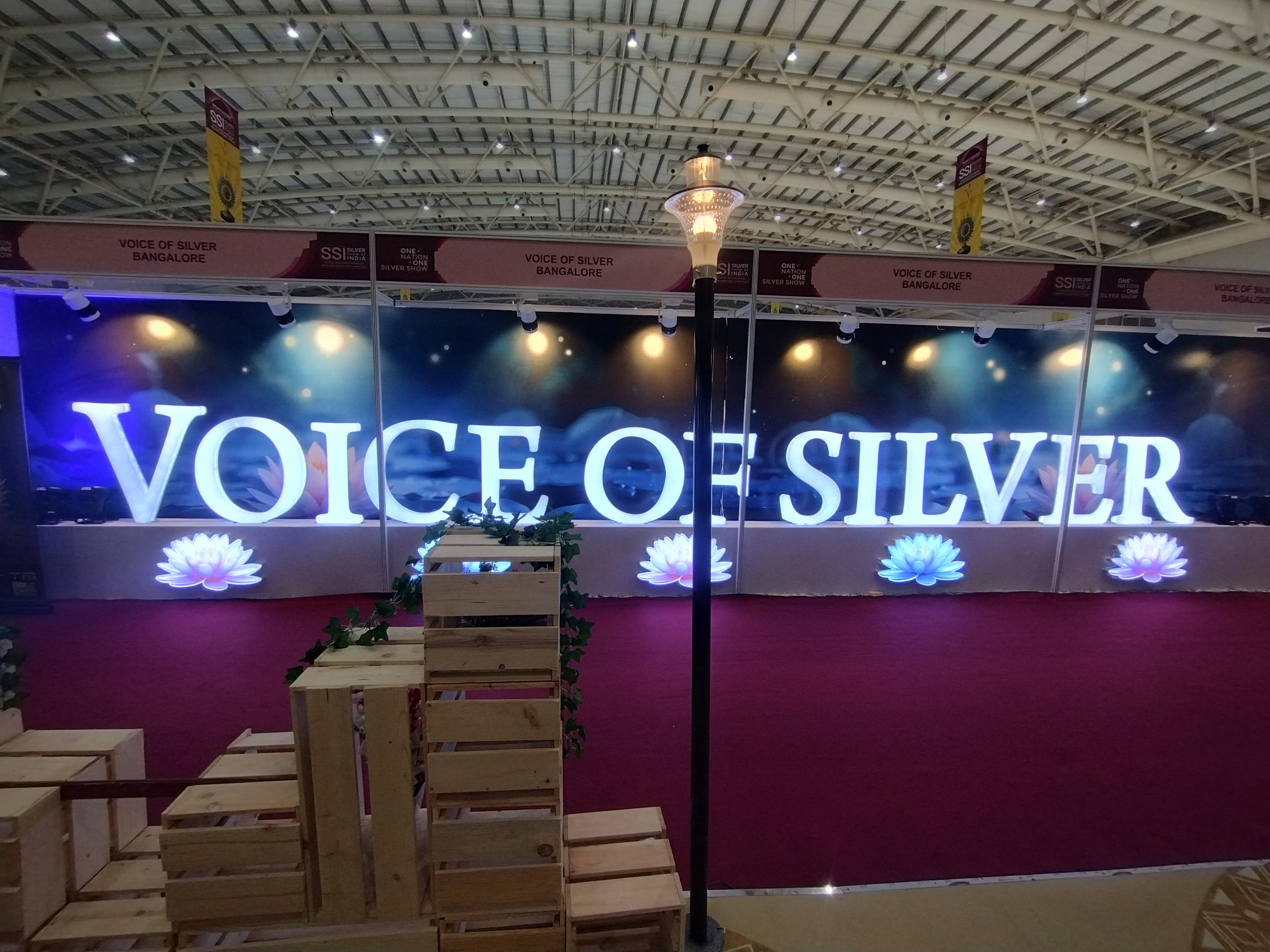
Exhibitors

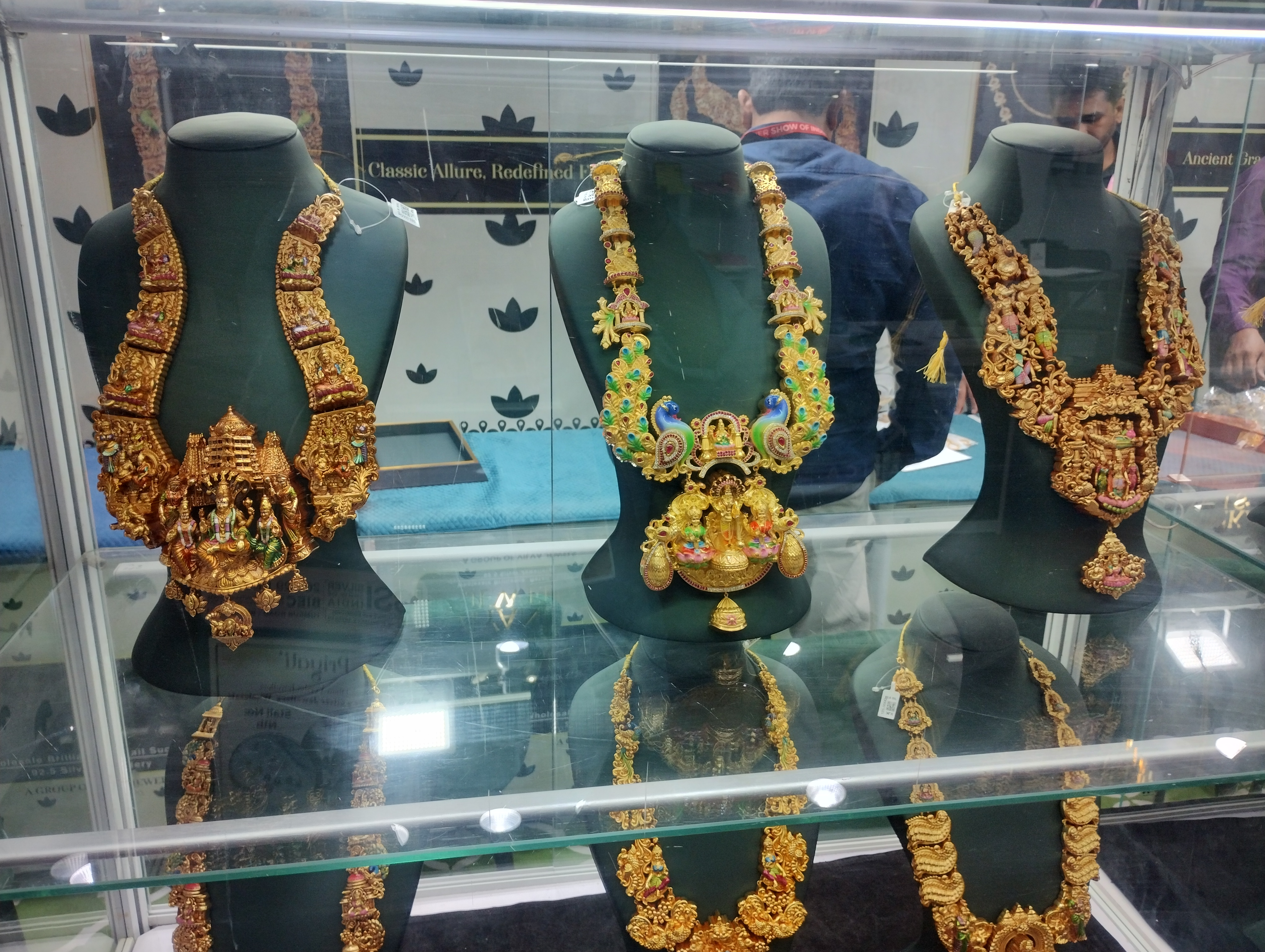
Gold coated silver ornaments

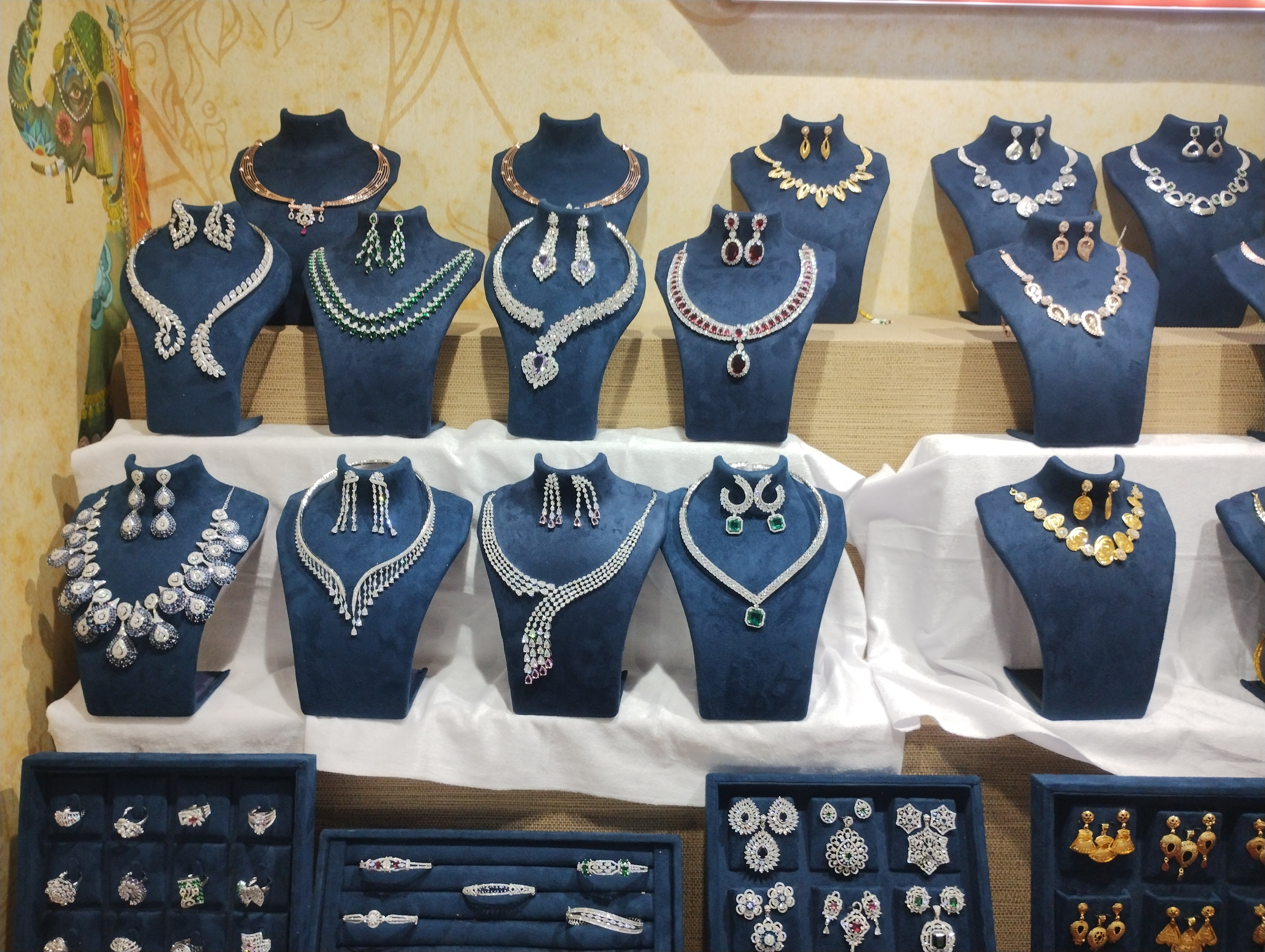
Silver ornaments
