= FLE receiver =

The FLE Projekt 32310 is a miniature modular spy receiver (Kleinstempfänger) developed and used by the Hauptverwaltung Aufklärung, the foreign intelligence agency of the East German Stasi. Developed for standalone for Base-to-Agent communication use, it operated completely independently of a transmitter and was designed for covert agents to receive one-way transmissions. It was also supplied in conjunction with the WSA-1 spy transmitter, as part of communication system 32210

== See also ==
- List of radios
