= Franciscans International =

Franciscans International (FI) is a non-governmental organization (NGO) with general Consultative Status at the United Nations. The organization operates under the sponsorship of the Conference of the Franciscan Family (CFF) and serves all members of the Franciscan family, as well as the global community by bringing spiritual, ethical, and Franciscan values to the United Nations and international organizations". The organization has headquarters in New York City, Geneva, and Bangkok.

FI closely follows the tradition of Saint Francis and Saint Clare, attempting to put Franciscan ideals into practice at the international level. The organization is guided by the Saints' proclaimed concern for the poor, care of creation, and peacemaking.

Franciscans around the world run schools, hospitals, Justice and Peace offices, shelters, and specialise in many services for the poor. The programmes at FI bring grassroots Franciscans to the United Nations forums in New York and Geneva, influencing international human rights standards and bringing witness to human rights violations.

Franciscans International is supported by the freewill offerings of Franciscan communities and their partners. A large part of the organization's funding comes from individuals who support Franciscan work for human rights, care for creation, and peacemaking. FI's advocacy programmes are designed in response to Franciscan needs worldwide.

== Vision statement ==
Vision: A global community built on Franciscan values, in which the dignity of every person is respected; resources are shared equitably; the environment is sustained; and nations and peoples live in peace.

Mission: We are a Franciscan voice at the United Nations protecting the vulnerable, the forgotten, and our wounded earth.

Advocacy Focus: The ministry of Franciscans International at the United Nations flows from its Vision. Our priority areas are: Extreme poverty, Environment, Peace-building. FI addresses these issues from an integrated rights-based approach. To do this FI uses the Universal Periodic Review (UPR) as the primary mechanism for advocacy work at the UN. As part of the UPR process, FI solicits issues of concern from Franciscans working at the grassroots, voices these concerns at the UN, and reports back to the Franciscan Family on progress made at the UN, who then in turn monitor these developments at the national level. FI further supports the Franciscan Family with issue and country-specific workshops relevant to these issues.

== History ==
1982: The origins of Franciscans International (FI) emerge when two Franciscans, Fr. Dionysius Mintoff OFM from Malta and Sr. Elizabeth Cameron OSF from the United States, write to the Franciscan Family in the USA, suggesting the possibility of having a Franciscan presence at the United Nations.

1984 – 1988: The idea quickly grows into a common project of the Franciscan Family (FF) and an interfamilial Preparatory Committee is organised in the US for this future ministry. This Committee prepares the FI Vision Statement based on three main goals: Raise awareness of the interconnectedness of all creation, and thus stressing the need to care for creation – both human and environmental; Promote peace; Voice concern for the world's poor.

1989: The UN Department of Public Information (DPI) officially recognises Franciscans International as a non-governmental organisation (NGO).

1990: FI opens an office in New York. At this stage the organisation is one based on "membership", with each member paying annual dues.

1991: The Preparatory Committee serves as the executive committee for FI and begins the process of applying for Consultative Status (Category 1) with the Economic and Social Council (ECOSOC) of the UN.

1995: FI receives General Consultative Status with ECOSOC at the UN. This allows FI to participate through oral interventions and written statements in the activities of ECOSOC. There are two directors: Br. Ignacio Harding OFM and Sr. Kathie Uhler OSF

1996: The Conference of the Franciscan Family (CFF), which includes the Ministers General of Friar Minors, Capuchins, Conventuals, the Third Order Regular and Secular Franciscan Order and the President of the Inter-Franciscan Conference Third Order Regular, meets in Rome and appoints a working group to prepare a new organizational ‘Charter’ for FI.

1997: FI, with Dominicans for Justice and Peace, opens an office in Geneva, Switzerland, where the Human Rights Commission (HRC) of the UN is located. Its focus is on the promotion and protection of human rights: civil, cultural, economic, political and social. Br. John Quigley OFM is the Director and Alessandra Aula the first advocacy officer.

1999: The Conference of the Franciscan Family (CFF) approves the new "FI Charter" and assumes its role as sponsor. The CFF appoints 13 men and women to the new FI international board of directors (IBD). The CFF abolish ‘membership dues’ stating that all Franciscans belong to FI and that each branch of the FF should contribute to the running costs of the organization.

2000: The FI board meets annually and aligns FI with its new ‘FI Charter’ under the direction of Fr. David B. Couturier OFM Cap, who was elected president of the first IBD.

2001: The CFF writes a letter to the international Franciscan Family, asking for their participation and support for the work of FI.

2003: The CFF appoints a second international board of directors, at their first meeting in Maryknoll Seminary in New York, and Sr. Denise Boyle FMDM is elected president.

2004, November: Fr. John Quigley OFM is appointed executive director for a three-year term with responsibility for the New York and Geneva offices.

2005: Through a generous grant from the OFM Capuchins Conference of the United States, FI establishes an Africa Desk to address issues of HIV and AIDS, peacemaking and conflict resolution. Br. Mike Perry, OFM is given responsibility for the implementation of the Africa Desk programme out of the New York office. The Anglican First and Third Order Franciscans formally join the CFF as FI sponsors. A partnership is established with the Marist Foundation for International Solidarity (FMSI); who will work with FI out of the Geneva office.

2006: The CFF appoints a third international board of directors. Fr. John Celichowski OFM Cap is elected president.

2008: FI opens its third office in Bangkok, Thailand, under the direction of Ms Julie Morgan, the first Regional Director for the Asia Pacific Programme. The primary role of the office is to bring the services of FI closer to the Franciscan Family and the most vulnerable in the Asia Pacific region. FI will simultaneously work with the regional arm of the UN, known as the Economic and Social Commission for Asia and the Pacific (ESCAP), located in Bangkok.

2008: Sr. Denise Boyle FMDM is appointed the new executive director by the IBD after an international employment search, with responsibility for the FI programme including the three regional offices in Bangkok, Geneva and New York.

2009: The CFF appoints a fourth International Board of Directors. Fr. John Doctor OFM is elected the President. FI begins preparatory work for its first 3-year strategic plan holding consultations with principle stakeholders, the Franciscan Family, funding agencies, donors and service providers.

2010: Regional Directors in place in each of the FI offices: Fr. Markus Heinze OFM in Geneva (Germany); Fr. Mike Lasky OFM Conv. in New York (USA); and Mr. Mateusz Tuniewicz in Bangkok, (Poland).

2010: First FI ‘Human Rights Award’ is presented to Fr. Dionysius Mintoff OFM, Malta, for his significant role in encouraging Franciscans to get involved in the UN, specifically for their international work on JPIC. In New York Sr. Mary Teresa Plante and Sr. Bernadette Sullivan receive the first ‘Outstanding Achievement Awards’ for their service to FI from its very inception.

2011: The international board of directors renews contract of Sr. Denise Boyle FMDM as executive director, for another three-year term to April 2014.

2010–2012: FI implements its 2010–2012 strategic plan detailing a revised vision and mission statement, which better suits the current advocacy work of FI, as requested by the Franciscan Family worldwide.

2011 August: Mateusz Tuniewicz drowns in Bali on his way home from an FI workshop in Indonesia. Sanjay Gathia is appointed the interim regional director until a new director is appointed.

2012, March: Fr. Elias Manuel OFM, Bangalore, India is appointed the new regional director for the Asia Pacific Programme after an international employment search.

2012: A new international board of directors is appointed by the CFF, with four members from the previous IBD and seven new members. Their first meeting is in Geneva in April, where Doug Clorey OFS, was elected president.
