= Plumbex India =

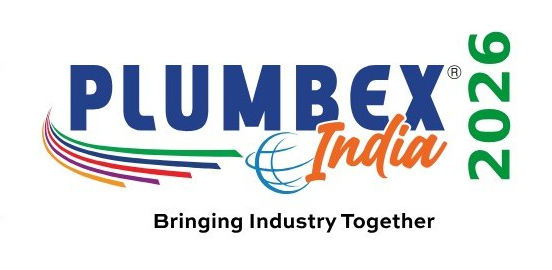
- Logo of Plumbex India 2026

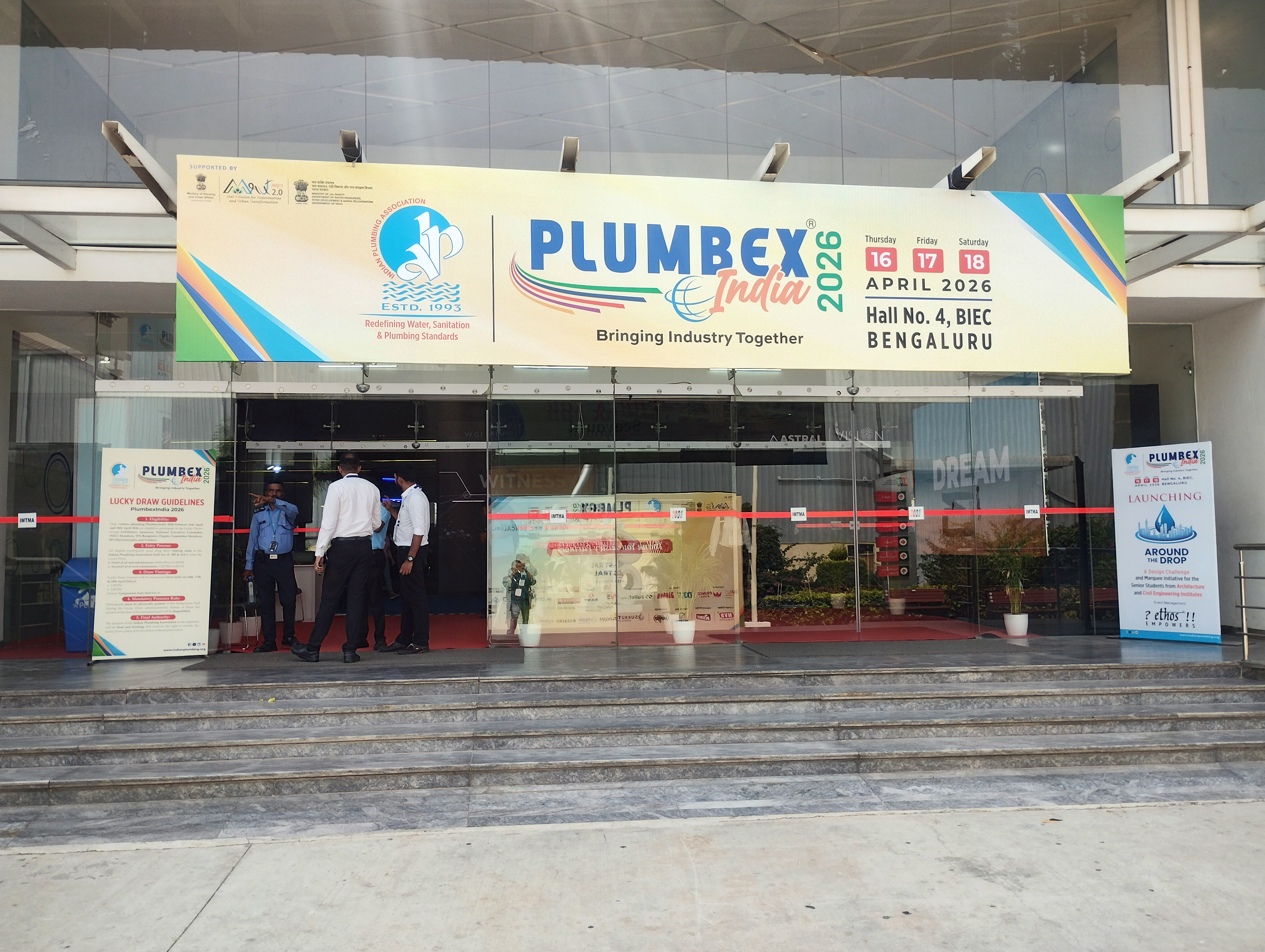
- Plumbex India 2026, BIEC

- Location of the event Plumbex India (India)
- Time: (+5:30)
- Duration: 2 days
- Venue: Madavara, Bengaluru
- Location: BIEC; 13°03′21.25″N 77°28′31.43″E
- Type: Exhibitions, conferences
- Theme: Bringing industry together
- Organised by: Ministry of Housing and Urban Affairs (MoHUA); Ministry of Jal Shakti (MoJS)
- Participants: 180+ exhibitors (2026 event)
- Website: www.plumbexindia.in

Plumbex India is India's largest exhibition on water, sanitation and plumbing. It is organized by Indian Plumbing Association.

The event is supported by the Ministry of Housing and Urban Affairs (MoHUA) and the Ministry of Jal Shakti (MoJS), the two ministries of the Government of India.

== Events ==
Plumbex India 2026 was organized in Bangalore International Exhibition Centre.

Plumbex India 2024 was organized in Jio World Convention Centre, Mumbai.

== Media gallery ==
Plumbex India 2026, BIEC, Bengaluru
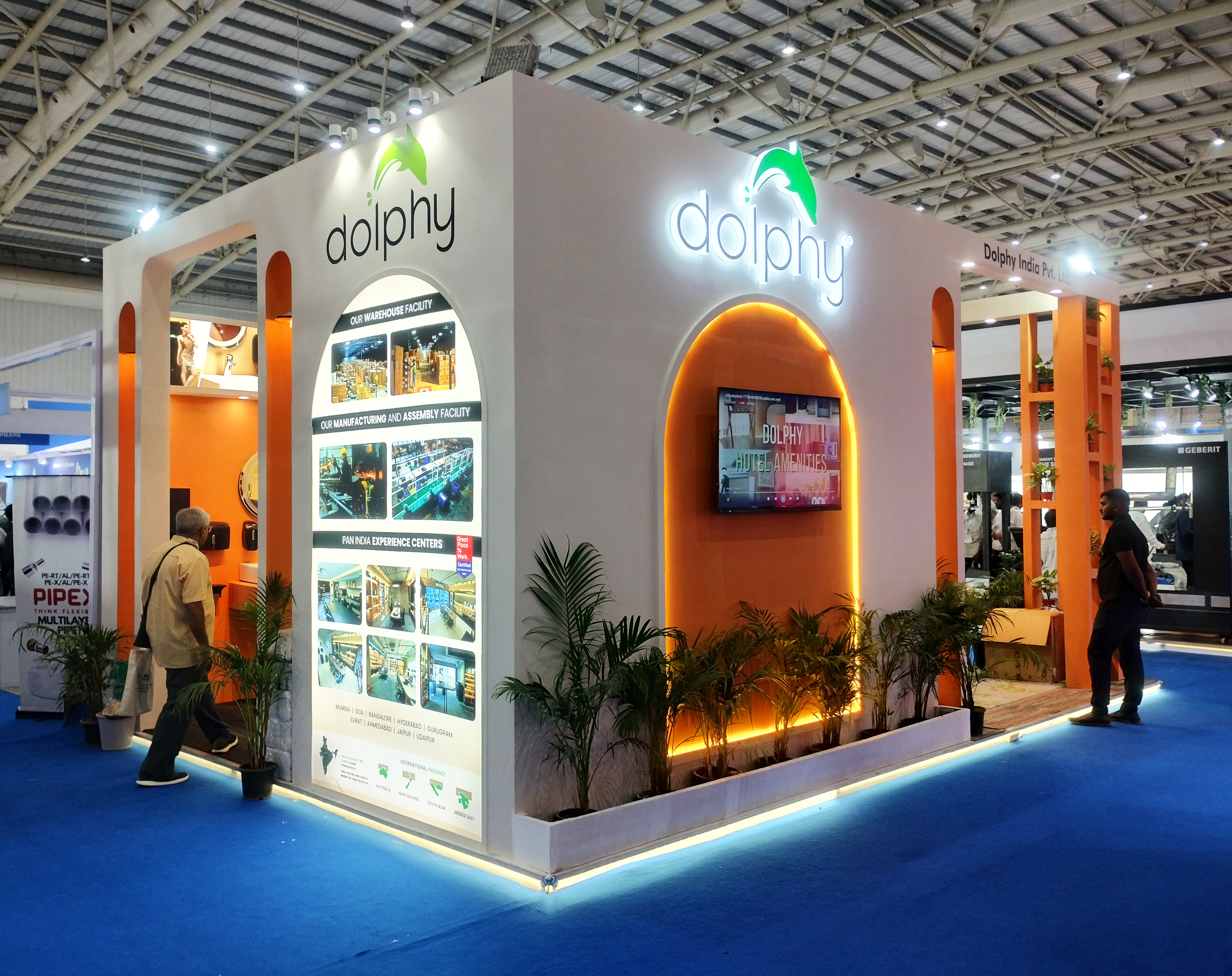

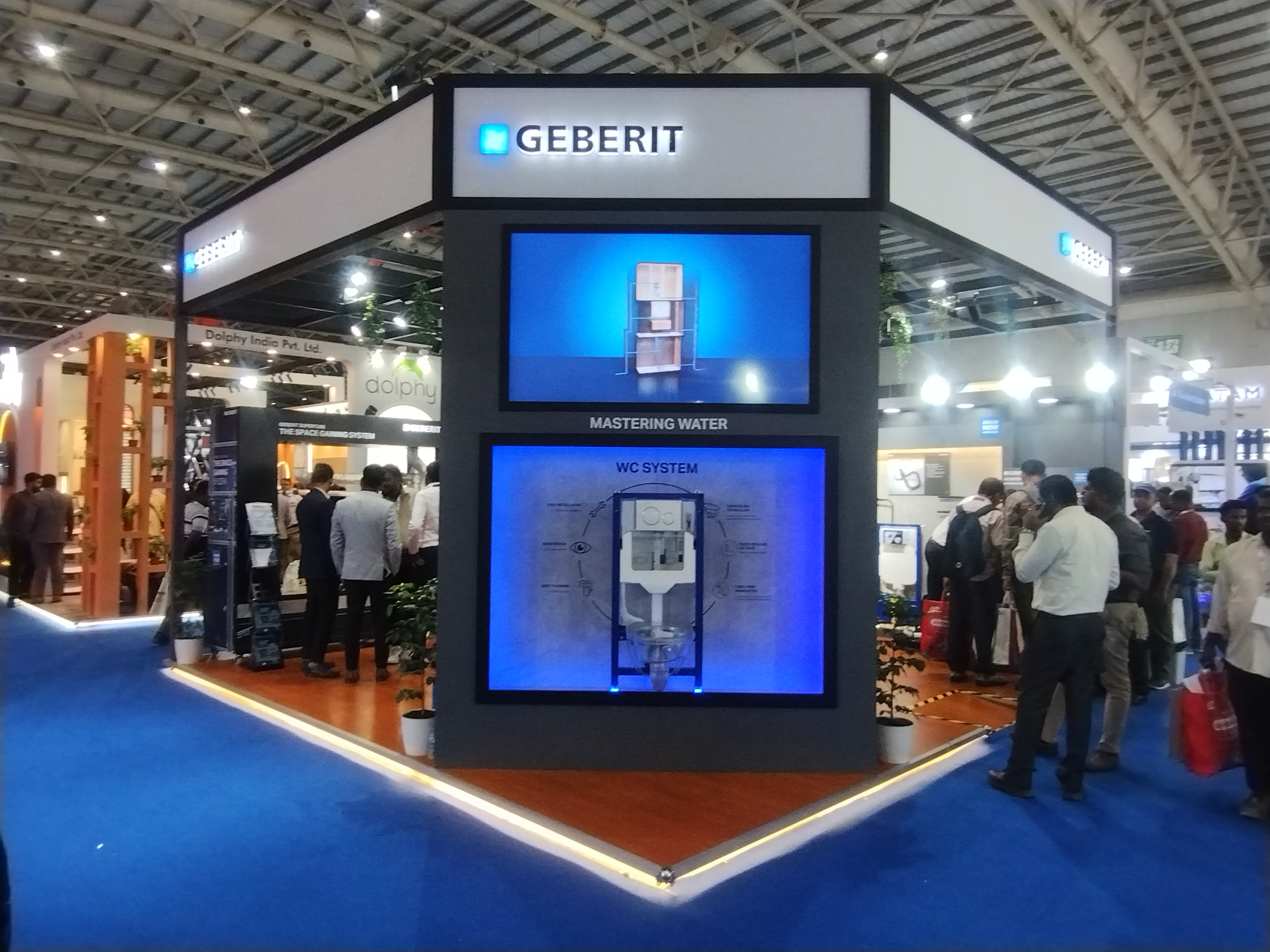

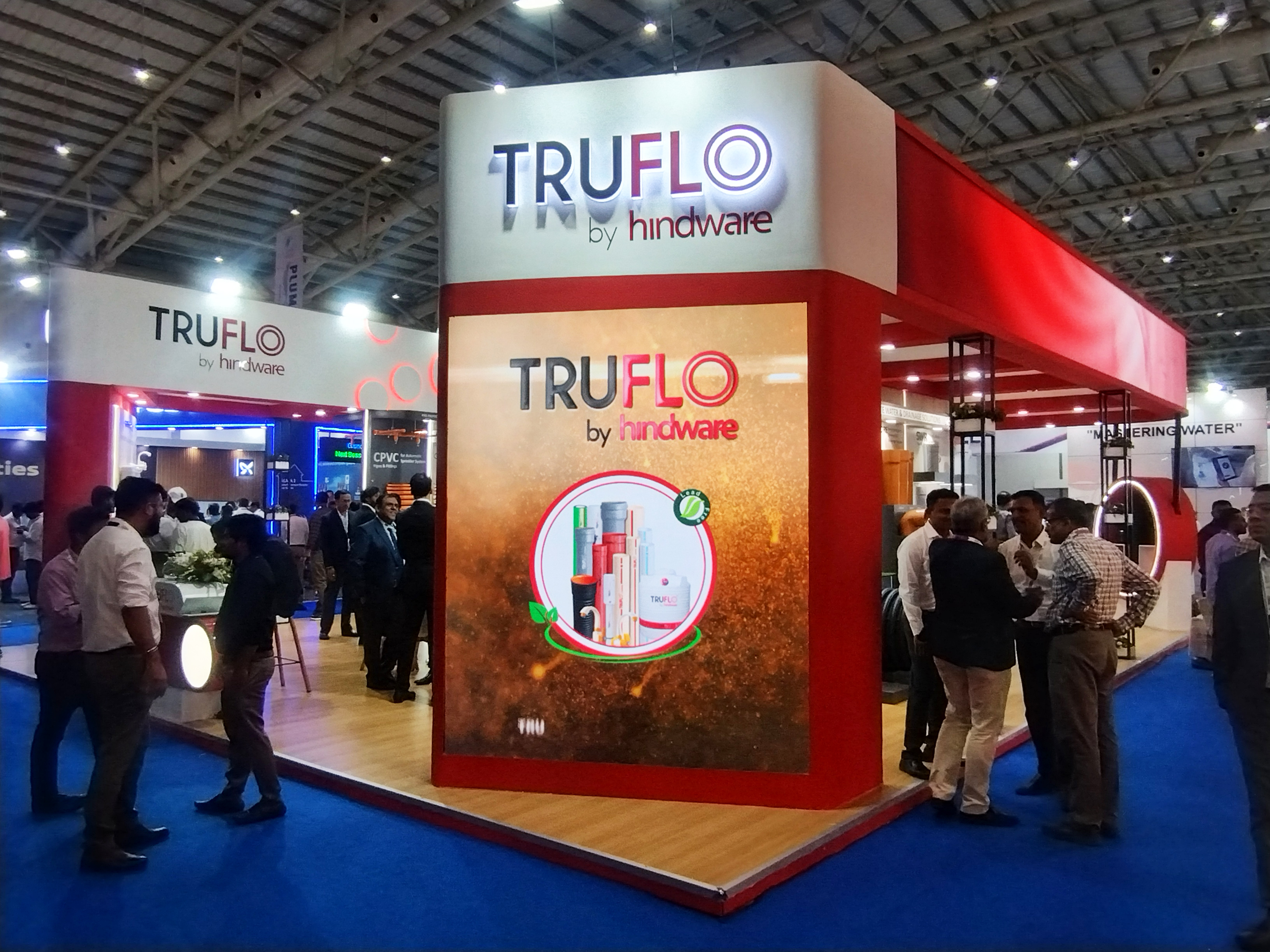

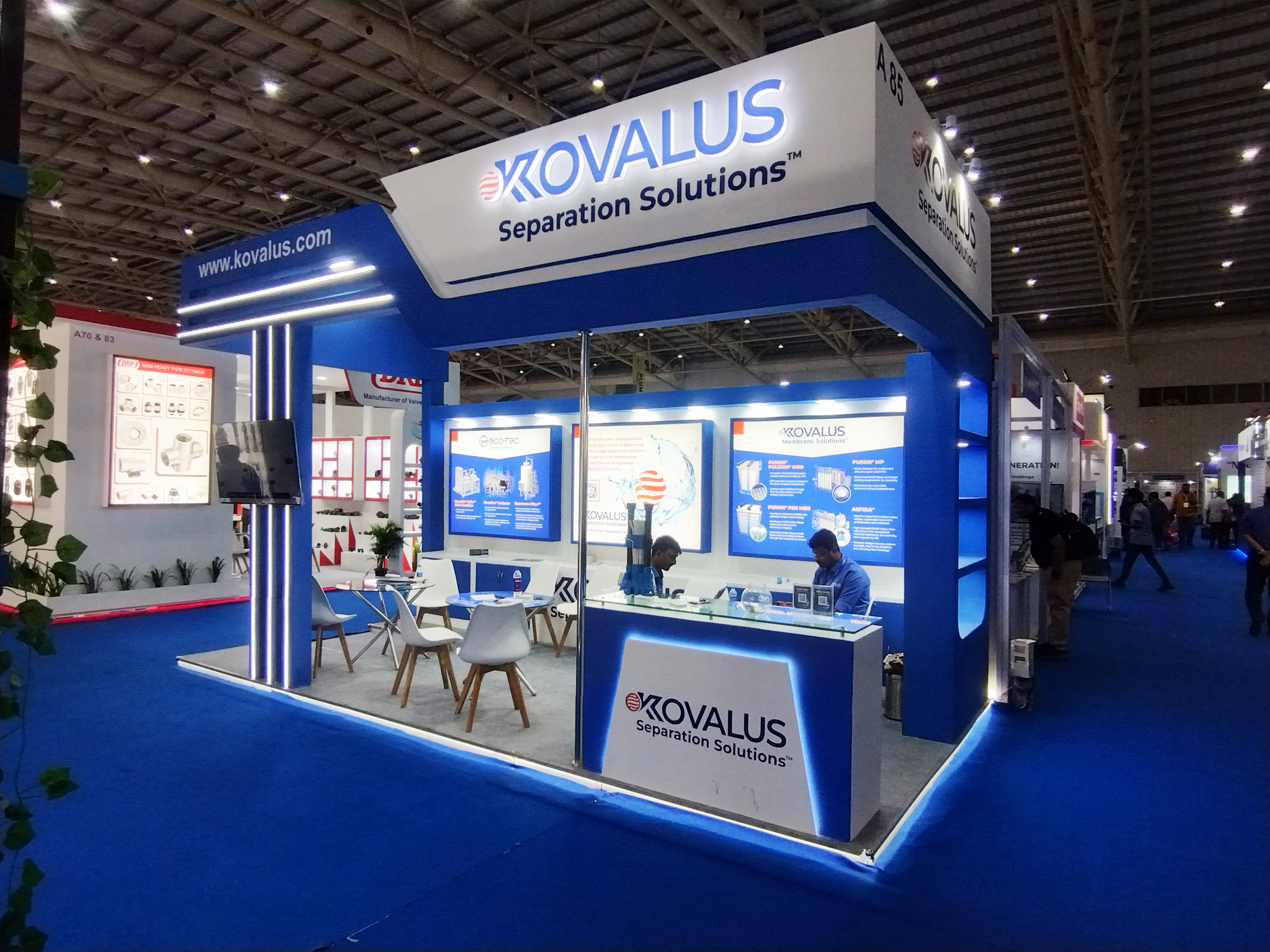
