= Biennial =

Biennial means (an event) lasting for two years or occurring every two years. The related term biennium is used in reference to a period of two years.

In particular, it can refer to:

- Biennial bearing trees, which produce fruit once every two years
- Biennial plant, a plant which blooms in its second year and then dies

== See also ==
- Biennale, the Italian word for "biennial" and a term used within the art world to describe an international exhibition of contemporary art, stemming from the use of the phrase for the Venice Biennale. (The English form, "biennial", is also commonly used to describe these art events.)
- Biannual, meaning twice a year
