= High fidelity (disambiguation) =

High fidelity or hi-fi is most commonly a term for the high-quality reproduction of sound or images.

High Fidelity or Hi-Fi may also refer to:

== Arts, entertainment, and media ==
=== Literature ===
- High Fidelity (novel), a 1995 novel by British author Nick Hornby

=== Music ===
==== Groups ====
- Hi-Fi (band), Russian pop and dance group
- Hi-Fi (American band)
- The High Fidelity, a British band

==== Albums ====
- Hi Fi (album), an album by Hugh Cornwell
- Hi Fi, a Tommy James album
- Hi-Fi (album), an album by Compulsion

==== Songs ====
- "High Fidelity" (song), a song by Elvis Costello and the Attractions
- "High Fidelity", a song by Daft Punk from their 1997 album Homework
- "High Fidelity", a song from the Jurassic 5 album Power in Numbers
- "Hi Fidelity", a song by The Kids from "Fame"
- "Hi-Fi", a song by Suede on their 1999 album Head Music
- "High Fidelity", a song by New Zealand pop singer Alisa Xayalith

=== Film ===
- High Fidelity (film), a 2000 film based on Nick Hornby's novel

=== Television ===
- HIFI (TV channel), a Canadian TV channel focusing on music and arts programming
- "High Fidelity" (Degrassi: The Next Generation), a 2006 teen drama episode
- High Fidelity (TV series), a Hulu television series

=== Other arts, entertainment, and media ===
- High Fidelity (musical), a 2006 Broadway musical based on Nick Hornby's novel
- High Fidelity (magazine), an American magazine — often abbreviated HiFi
- Hi, Fidelity (2011), a 2011 Hong Kong film directed by Calvin Poon
- High Fidelity, a 1984 computer-animated short film
- Hifi, a Finnish magazine published from 1978 to 2006, when it merged with MikroBitti

== Other uses ==
- High fidelity in space mapping
- Hi-Fi murders, a crime that occurred in Ogden, Utah, in 1974
- High Fidelity Inc, a virtual world company launched by former Second Life founder Philip Rosedale
- HiFi, a range of digital signal processing equipment by Tensilica

== See also ==
- Lo-fi (disambiguation)
- Hi Infidelity, a 1980 music album by REO Speedwagon
- High Infidelity, a 1964 Italian comedy film
- "High Infidelity", a 2022 song by Taylor Swift
- The B-52's (album), an album sometimes erroneously called "High Fidelity"
