= Battle of Fei =

Battle of Fei may refer to:

- Battle of Fei (233 BC) (肥之戰), fought between the Qin and Zhao states in 233 BC
- Battle of Fei River (淝水之戰), fought between Former Qin and Eastern Jin Dynasty in AD 383
