= Lo-fi (disambiguation) =

Lo-fi music is music which deliberately includes recording imperfections.

Lo-fi may also refer to:

- Lofi hip-hop, a downtempo genre
- Lo-fi photography, photographic practices giving an impression of low quality
- "Lo-Fi", a 2008 episode of American TV series Criminal Minds
- Lofi, Unix feature, short for "loop file interface" or loop device
- Lo-fi, in audio electronics, colloquial term referring to (the opposite of) high fidelity

== See also ==
- Lofi Girl, a YouTube channel featuring an animated character of the same name
