= FIE3 (ftz instability element 3′) element =

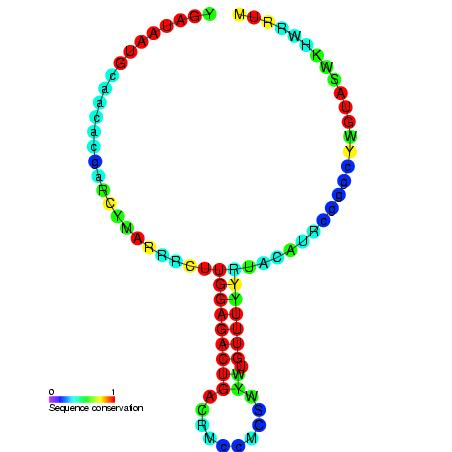
- Predicted secondary structure and sequence conservation of FIE3

Identifiers
- Symbol: FIE3
- Rfam: RF00227

Other data
- RNA type: Cis-reg
- Domain(s): Eukaryota
- SO: SO:0000233
- PDB structures: PDBe

The FIE3 (ftz instability element 3′) element is an RNA element found in the 3′ UTR of the fushi tarazu mRNA. The fushi tarazu gene is essential for the establishment of the Drosophila embryonic body plan. When first expressed in early embryogenesis, fushi tarazu mRNA is uniformly distributed over most of the embryo. Subsequently, fushi tarazu mRNA expression rapidly evolves into a pattern of seven stripes that encircle the embryo. The instability of fushi tarazu mRNA may contribute to the localization of this pattern of expression, but this is unlikely to be a dominant effect since the 744 base-pair ftz zebra stripe element can drive the ectopic expression of a reporter construct (with mRNA structure entirely unrelated to the ftz transcript) in a qualitatively highly similar pattern. Experiments provide evidence for at least two destabilizing elements in the fushi tarazu mRNA, one located within the 5′ one-third of the mRNA and the other near the 3′ end (termed FIE3 for ftz instability element 3′). The FIE3 lies within a 201-nucleotide sequence just upstream of the polyadenylation signal and can act autonomously to destabilize a heterologous mRNA. Further deletion constructs identified an essential 68-nucleotide element within the FIE3. Although this element is predicted to contain a secondary structure, it also contains a GU rich sequence (UGUUUUGUUU) that is similar to GU rich instability elements subsequently identified in other systems.
