= Indian Machine Tool Manufacturers' Association =

Indian industrial body

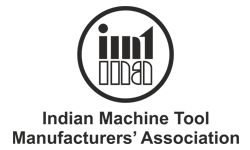
- Abbreviation: IMTMA
- Formation: 1946; 80 years ago
- Type: Non-governmental trade association
- Purpose: Policy advocacy
- Headquarters: Bangalore, India
- Region served: India
- Services: Policy Advocacy; Imparting Training for Machine Tool and Manufacturing Industries; Business Development; Conferences and Trade Fairs
- Field: Machine tools
- Members: 484
- Employees: 89
- Website: www.imtma.in

Indian Machine Tool Manufacturers' Association (IMTMA) is the apex industry body for the machine tool sector in India. Comprising large-, medium- and small-scale units, the membership of IMTMA includes manufacturers in the entire range of metal working machine tools, accessories and other ancillary equipment for machine tools, cutting tools and tooling systems along with trading companies.

== Objectives ==
IMTMA supports the machine tool industry of India in increasing its competitiveness, technology, productivity and quality for overall advancement and growth. The association has actively supported initiatives for advancement of metalworking manufacturing industry in India.

== Association activities ==
=== Membership ===
The membership of IMTMA is open to any Indian company including large, medium and small scale units engaged in metalworking machine tools, machine tool consumables, accessories and other ancillary equipment for machine tool industry.

=== Policy advocacy ===
The association vouches member concerns to the government for formulating policies supporting the machine tool industry. IMTMA provides policy inputs to various government agencies on specific issues referred to it from time to time.

=== Publications ===
IMTMA consistently produces research publications. These publications, including the Comprehensive Metal Working Report, Market Research Reports, User Sector Updates, and more, are published at regular intervals and are accessible to both the public and member companies. Covering a wide range of topics, Additionally, IMTMA's newsletters and industry databases serve as resources.

=== Export development ===
IMTMA supports the export efforts of its members through various initiatives such as group participation in overseas fairs, trade missions, etc. In view of the periodic variation in machine tool markets it is imperative to develop a healthy market mix between domestic and export market.

=== Cluster development ===
IMTMA Cluster Development cell was conceptualized and implemented for the overall development of the cluster. This initiative acted as a focal point for all formal and informal linkages between various cluster actors.

=== Technology development ===
IMTMA has taken several initiatives to catalyze technology development among its members and open up new opportunities for research and development by initiating academia-industry cooperation in R&D projects. IMTMA helps members with their technology issues by identifying suitable academic / R&D institutions which have required expertise to develop solutions for them. After sustained advocacy with the Government of India, it was possible to create an Advanced Centre of Excellence for R&D and Technology Development in machine tools with IIT, Madras. This will help develop new technology and products by the machine tool units where the government funds 80% of the development cost as a grant.

=== C-MAT ===
As a result of IMTMA's interaction, the Government of India in the year 2009 constituted a C-MAT (Core Advisory Group for Research and Development in the Machine Tools Sector). The industry has implemented several R&D projects through industry-academia partnership by this scheme.

=== Regional councils ===
The regional councils of IMTMA promote the growth of the association activities and in particular serve as brand ambassadors for membership enhancement drive. IMTMA has 3 regional councils which play a role in addressing issues of regional importance and serve as liaison between IMTMA head office and regional members.

=== Bangalore International Exhibition Centre ===
Bangalore International Exhibition Centre (BIEC) was conceptualized by IMTMA with an objective of providing an international standard infrastructure for organizing trade exhibitions, industrial conferences and other business-to-business (B2B) events. Besides hosting IMTEX, BIEC acted as the facilitator for business cooperation in a wide segment of industries such as capital goods, oil and gas equipment, plastics processing, telecom equipment, textile machinery sector, food processing and dairy equipment, automobiles, auto components, aluminum extrusion, electrical and electronics industries and many more.

BIEC venue has also been used by leading industry associations such as Confederation of Indian Industry (CII), Federation of Indian Chambers of Commerce & Industry (FICCI) and many other trade associations for their B2B events. Some of these being:

- EXCON 2015 (8th edition) organized by CII in November 2015 for propelling sustainable infrastructure growth.
- Bengaluru Space Expo 2014 (Asia's only focused exhibition on space technologies, products and innovations) organized by CII in November 2014.
- Indian Medical Expo to be jointly organized by the Department of Pharmaceuticals, Ministry of Chemicals & Fertilizers and FICCI in January 2016 is expected to give a huge boost to the medical electronics industry.
- STONA 2016 organized by Federation of Indian Granite and Stone Industry – FIGSI (earlier known as All India Granites and Stone Association - AIGSA) in February 2016. The event is expected to give the natural stone industry in India a significant growth opportunity with higher visibility.

BIEC has hosted prominent events organized by the Government of India as well as the Government of Karnataka at its premises. These being:

- Mobile-One E Governance by the Department of IT, BT & ST, Government of Karnataka in December 2014 which had the President of India, Shri Pranab Mukherjee visiting BIEC.
- Global Investors Meet by the Government of Karnataka in June 2012 for bringing together business leaders, investors, corporations, thought leaders, policy and opinion makers.
- PATA Travel Mart, a travel trade show to showcase travel products and services organized by the Department of Tourism, Government of Karnataka in September 2015.
- Mining, Exploration Convention & Trade Show supported by the Ministry of Mines, Government of India in September 2015 to attract investments and technology in the sector.
- CeBIT India supported by the Government of Karnataka in October 2015 to help the information technology fraternity in the state.

==== Expansion ====
BIEC has constructed a new hall of 17,500 m^{2}, which is an add-on facility to its existing infrastructure. The newly built Hall 4 was inaugurated by Mr. Girish Shankar, Department of Heavy Industry, Ministry of Heavy Industries, Govt. of India on 26 January 2017. IMTEX 2017 inaugurated by Chief Minister of Karnataka Shri Siddaramaiah was the first exhibition held in this hall.

== History ==
The history of the association is the history of the machine tool industry in India. The concept of binding machine tool manufacturers into an association was first mooted at an informal gathering of ‘like-minded’ manufacturers. The manufacturers met at a formal gathering in New Delhi on 20 September 1946 to concretise the thoughts of bringing together all machine tool manufacturers under one umbrella body. The meeting chaired by Sir Dhunjishaw B. Cooper came up with the name of "Indian Machine Tool Manufacturers’ Association" or IMTMA in short for this umbrella body representing the interest of the machine tool industry. The association was granted instant recognition by the government as a body representing machine tool manufacturers in the country. IMTMA was constituted with 19 members.

=== Executive committee ===
The seal of recognition of IMTMA was affirmed at the first meeting of the association's executive committee on 28 August 1947 at Indian Merchant's Chamber in Bombay. The chairman of the first executive committee was Sir Dhunjishaw B. Cooper.

=== Annual meeting ===
The first annual general meeting of IMTMA was held on 29 January 1948 at Indian Merchant's Chamber at Lalji Naranji Memorial Building in Bombay. A meeting of the first-elected members of IMTMA executive committee followed the first annual general meeting. The meeting unanimously elected M.B. Jambhekar as president of IMTMA and D.S. Mulla as the first vice president of the association. Subsequent annual general meetings of the association were held every year.

=== Registration ===
IMTMA was reconstituted as an association registered under the Indian Companies Act in Bombay on 26 March 1973.

=== Secretariat ===
In its early days the association operated from Bombay. In 1965 IMTMA moved into its own premises in Rampart Row. In 1991 the association shifted from Bombay to Delhi. IMTMA office in Bangalore came into existence two years later in 1993. With nearly 50% of the machine tool companies being based in Bangalore besides a large concentration of manufacturers in prominent industry sectors such as aerospace, defence, etc. also in the city, IMTMA felt the need of setting up a Centre of Excellence to cater requirements of the industries based in the region and also the need to have a world class exhibition infrastructure. With those thoughts BIEC was constituted. This eventually became the head office of IMTMA and the Gurgaon office becoming the regional office in north.

=== IMTEX ===
The first "All India Machine Tool Exhibition" was held in 1969 in the premises Godrej & Boyce Manufacturing Company Private Limited in Vikhroli, Mumbai, over 7,000 square metres. Initially christened as the "All India Machine Tool Exhibition", this later became "IMTEX". Bombay continued to host IMTEX for the next two decades until 1989. In 1992, IMTEX moved from Bombay to New Delhi and was held in Pragati Maidan with participation from over 600 companies. IMTEX and concurrent Tooltech exhibition was held in Bangalore for the first time in 2007, when IMTMA constructed a new venue called the Bangalore International Exhibition Centre (BIEC). IMTMA continues to host the IMTEX (metal cutting) every odd year and IMTEX FORMING (metal forming) every even year at BIEC.

== See also ==
- International Textile Machinery Association exhibition
