= Barthold Fles =

American writer (1902–1989)

- Born: February 7, 1902; Amsterdam, Netherlands
- Died: December 19, 1989 (aged 87); Laren, Netherlands
- Occupations: literary agent; author; translator; editor; publisher
- Spouse: Ruth Grünwald (div.)
- Relatives: Louis Fles (father); George Fles (brother); Michael John Fles (nephew); Bart Berman (nephew)
- Writing career
- Pen name: Jan van Straaten
- Genres: non-fiction; juvenile
- Subjects: music; literature
- Notable works: books: Slavonic rhapsody, Briefwechsel; translations: Music here and now, Bambi's children; articles: Chávez lights new music with old fires, Literature in exile

Barthold Fles (February 7, 1902 – December 19, 1989) was a Dutch-American literary agent, author, translator, editor and publisher. Among his many clients were Elias Canetti, Raymond Loewy, Heinrich Mann, Joseph Roth, Felix Salten, Ignazio Silone, Bruno Walter and Arnold Zweig.

== Early life and education ==
Barthold Fles was born in Amsterdam into an assimilating Jewish family. His father, Louis Fles, was a businessman and an activist against religion. Barthold had a tense relationship with his father, who wanted him into his business, while the young Fles was mostly interested in reading. Barthold read in Dutch, German, English, and French. He studied business at a vocational school and found employment at De Lange publishers.

In 1923 he left for the United States. In New York Fles found temporary employment as a violinist, painting apartments, selling vacuum cleaners and working for publishers.

== Literary agency ==
In 1933, he established a literary agency in Manhattan, New York. Initially many of his clients were German refugees and other foreign authors. He organized evenings for these authors in New York, in order to get them acquainted with the American book market. From the 1940s onwards most of his clientele was from the United States.

Fles was influential in the lives of many of his clients. He kept closely in touch, encouraged his authors to concentrate on their art, and arranged fellowships with literary funds. Still, some clients moved on to larger agencies, or were later represented by publishing houses, lawyers, or by themselves, often after long relationships. An exception was Anaïs Nin who left him soon after she joined his client circle, citing unorganized business conduct as a reason. "Bonjour, friend, and good-bye, literary agent", she wrote to him. In biographical notes on Fles, she stated that he had refused to take on her boyfriend Henry Miller. Miller himself also had hard feelings, calling Fles dishonest and part of the publishing establishment. Fles was active during several decades in getting blacklisted authors published.

Barthold Fles wrote two juvenile books: Slavonic rhapsody: the life of Antonín Dvořák (1948) under the pseudonym Jan van Straaten (Van Straaten being his mother's maiden name) and East Germany (1973). He also wrote introductions to compilations and many articles and translated several books from German to English. Among the translations was another children's book, Bambi's Children by Felix Salten. His non-fictional writings and his translations received considerable praise, except for his book on Germany. This book was outside his (music and literature) expertise and sealed his writing for publication, set aside an intro to More by Dell Shannon (1982), by his prolific client Elizabeth Linington.

== Personal and legacy ==
In 1936 Barthold married Ruth Grünwald, a dancer at the Metropolitan Opera who had been just one year in the United States. Ruth assisted Barthold at his literary agency. Later she left him.

In 1986, at the age of 84, Fles closed his agency. Subsequently, he returned to his native Netherlands, where he spent his last three years in Laren's Rosa Spier home for retired artists. At Rosa Spier he was approached by Madeleine Rietra, a Dutch expert on German literature, who posthumously published his letter exchange with clients Joseph Roth (bookchapter in 1991) and Heinrich Mann (book in 1993), along with commentaries and biographical notes.

Barthold Fles, a diabetic for several decades, died on December 19, 1989, aged 87.

== Clients ==
- Rankin Barbee
- Cedric Belfrage
- Don Berry
- Wilhelmina de Bois
- Robbie Branscum
- Bertolt Brecht
- Elias Canetti
- Whittaker Chambers
- Fred Cook
- L. Sprague de Camp
- Maurits Dekker
- Ed Dolan
- Mary Dolim
- A. den Doolaard
- Albert Ehrenstein
- Otto Eisenschiml
- Carlos Embry
- Guy Endore
- Charles Finney
- Lion Feuchtwanger
- James Herndon
- Langston Hughes
- Dola de Jong
- Carl Jung
- Irmgard Keun
- Otto Klemperer
- Oskar Kokoschka
- Dean Koontz
- Ernst Krenek
- Joseph Wood Krutch
- Margaret Larkin
- Raymond Loewy
- Walter Lowenfels
- Elizabeth Linington
- Richard Lyttle
- Erika Mann
- Heinrich Mann
- Klaus Mann
- Margaret Maron
- Walter Mehring
- Jessica Mitford
- Helen Markley Miller
- Rutherford Montgomery
- Gorham Munson
- Bud Murphy
- Hans Natonek
- Rose Naumann
- Anaïs Nin
- Hollister Noble
- Iris Noble
- Leo Perutz
- Lea Bayers Rapp
- Theodor Reik
- Jean Rikhoff
- Henriette Roland Holst
- Joseph Roth
- Jean Rouverol
- Felix Salten
- Richard Sharpe
- Ignazio Silone
- Henry Simon
- Stan Steiner
- Janet Stevenson
- Philip Stevenson
- Bruno Walter
- Jakob Wassermann
- Frank Waters
- Kurt Weill
- Arnold Zweig

== Publications ==
=== Books ===
==== Written ====
- 1948 - Slavonic rhapsody: The life of Antonín Dvořák
- 1973 - East Germany
- 1993 - Briefwechsel mit Barthold Fles, 1942-1949 (with Heinrich Mann; editor Madeleine Rietra)

==== Compiled ====
- 1948 - The best short stories from Collier's
- 1949 - Seven short novels from the Woman's Home Companion
- 1951 - The Saturday Evening Post western stories
- 1951 - The Saturday Evening Post Fantasy Stories

==== Translated ====
- 1939 - Ernst Krenek: Music here and now
- 1939 - Felix Salten: Bambi's children
- 1943 - Hans Natonek: In search of myself

==== Published ====
These German Exilliteratur poetry books were published by Barthold Fles Verlag, New York

- 1941 - Max Herrmann-Neisse: Letzte Gedichte
- 1941 - Berthold Viertel: Fürchte dich nicht! Neue Gedichte
- 1942 - Hans Sahl: Der hellen Nächte, Gedichte Aus Frankreich
- 1942 - Max Hermann-Neisse: Mir bleibt mein Lied, Auswahl aus unveröffentlichten Gedichten (posthumous publication)

=== Articles ===
==== Written ====
- 1928-09-15 - Chávez lights new music with old fires. Musical America 48 (22): 5 & 21.
- 1932-05-18 - The Price of Being Sensible. The Nation 134 (3489): 576.
- 1934-07-04 - Now as a Story Teller. The New Republic: 216. (book review of Kaleidoscope by Stefan Zweig)
- 1935-03-10 - In Holland Writers Favor the Exotic. The New York Times: BR 8 & ?.
- 1935-10-27 - Van Gogh Letters and Other Dutch Books. The New York Times: BR 8 & ?.
- 1935-12-24 - The Literary Scene In Holland. The New York Times: 61.
- 1935-11-02 - Rococo Italy in a Picaresque Novel. The Saturday Review of Literature 8 (1): 12.
- 1936 - Literature in Exile. Story 9: 8, 101-102.
- 1936-08-23 - Holland Turns to the Historical Novel. The New York Times: BR 8.
- 1945-07-28 - What Has Happened to Them Since? Reply. Publishers Weekly: 307.
- 1950-06-04 - A Literary Letter about Holland. The New York Times: BR 11.
- 1951-10 and 11 - The Literary Agent. The Writer 64 (10): 319-323, (11): 361-365. (also included in the book Briefwechsel mit Barthold Fles)

==== Translated ====
- 1935 - Nettie Sutro: Biographical Note on the author in Ignazio Silone: Mr. Aristotle

== Biography ==
- Madeleine Rietra: "Der New Yorker Literaturagent Barthold Fles als Vermittler zwischen der alten und neuen Welt (1933-1945)" in Batts MS (ed.): Alte Welten - neue Welten, Akten des IX. Kongresses der Internationale Vereinigung für Germanische Sprach- und Literaturwissenschaft. Tübingen: Niemeyer, 1996, p. 164. ISBN 3-484-10718-9.
- Madeleine Rietra: "Heinrich Mann/Barthold Fles: Autor/Agent" in Würzner H, Kröhnke K (eds.): Deutsche Literatur im Exil in den Niederlanden 1933-1940. Amsterdam: Rodopi, 1994, p 151-162. ISBN 978-90-5183-649-3.
- Els Andringa (2012): "Mediatie en transfer van Duitse Exilliteratuur in Nederlandse setting; Over de rol van mediatoren met bijzondere aandacht voor de opkomst van literaire agenten". Tijdschrift voor Nederlandse Taal- en Letterkunde, volume 128, p. 276.
