= Giorgio van Straten =

Italian novelist and librettist (born 1955)

- Born: 1955 (age 70–71); Florence, Italy
- Occupations: Novelist, librettist, playwright, editor, translator, critic, manager
- Relatives: Louis Fles, Barthold Fles; George Fles, Michael Fles; Bart Berman, Helen Berman, Thijs Berman
- Writing career
- Genre: fiction
- Notable works: Il mio nome a memoria (My Name, A Living Memory)
- Notable awards: Grand Official Order of Merit of the Republic, Viareggio Prize, Zerilli-Marimò Prize for Italian Fiction

Giorgio van Straten (born 1955) is an Italian writer and manager of arts organizations. His first novel Generazione was published in 1987. In 2000, he won four literary prizes for Il mio nome a memoria, published in English as My Name, A Living Memory (2003), the story of his Jewish-Dutch family from 1811 to our days. That same year, he was awarded the Grand Official Order of Merit of the Italian Republic.

== Writing career ==
Van Straten translated from English into Italian The Secret Garden by Frances Hodgson Burnett (Giunti, 1992), The Call of the Wild by Jack London (Giunti, 1994), The Jungle Book by Rudyard Kipling (Giunti, 1995) and The Pavilion on the dunes of Robert Louis Stevenson (The Unit, 1997).

For musical theatre he wrote Tre voci for voice, string orchestra, percussion and tape, music by Giorgio Battistelli, commissioned by the Sagra Musicale Umbra (First performance: Assisi, 1996); Auf den Marmorklippen (On the Marble Cliffs), from the novel by Ernst Jünger, music by Giorgio Battistelli (First performance: National Theatre, Mannheim, 2002); Open Air, music of Andrea Molino, commissioned by the Società Aquilana dei Concerti (First performance: L'Aquila, 2012); Here there is no why, multimedia music theatre project by Andrea Molino (first performance at the Teatro Comunale, Bologna, 2014).

=== Books written ===
- Generazione (1987)
- Hai sbagliato foresta (1989)
- Ritmi per il nostro ballo (1992)
- Corruzione (1995)
- Il mio nome a memoria (2000) English translation "My name a living memory"
- L'impegno spaesato (2002)
- La verità non serve a niente (2008)
- Storia d'amore in tempo di guerra (2014)
- Storie di libri perduti (2016) English translation "In search of lost books" (Pushkin Press, 2017)
- Una disperata vitalità (2022)
- La ribelle (2025) English translation The Rebel (2027)

== Management career ==
From 1985 to 2002, van Straten was the chairman of the Orchestra della Toscana. From 1997 to 2002, he was on the board of directors of the Biennale di Venezia and from 1998 to 2002 he also served as president of AGIS, the Italian Association for the Performing Arts.

From 2002 to 2005, Van Straten was the general director of the Maggio Musicale Fiorentino. From 2005 to 2008, he managed Palazzo delle Esposizioni e Scuderie del Quirinale in Rome. From 2009 to 2012, he was on the board of directors of the RAI. From 2015 to 2019, he was the director of the Italian Cultural Institute in New York.

Since 2020, he has been the President of FAF Toscana – Fondazione Alinari per la Fotografia.

== Honours and awards ==
- Il Ceppo Prize (1989)
- Castiglioncello Prize (1995)
- Grand Official Order of Merit of the Italian Republic (2000)
- Adei-Wizo Prize (2000)
- Procida-Isola di Arturo-Elsa Morante Prize (2000)
- Viareggio Prize (2000)
- Zerilli-Marimò Prize for Italian Fiction (2000)
- Giacomo Matteotti Prize (2015)
