= Michael John Fles =

American poet

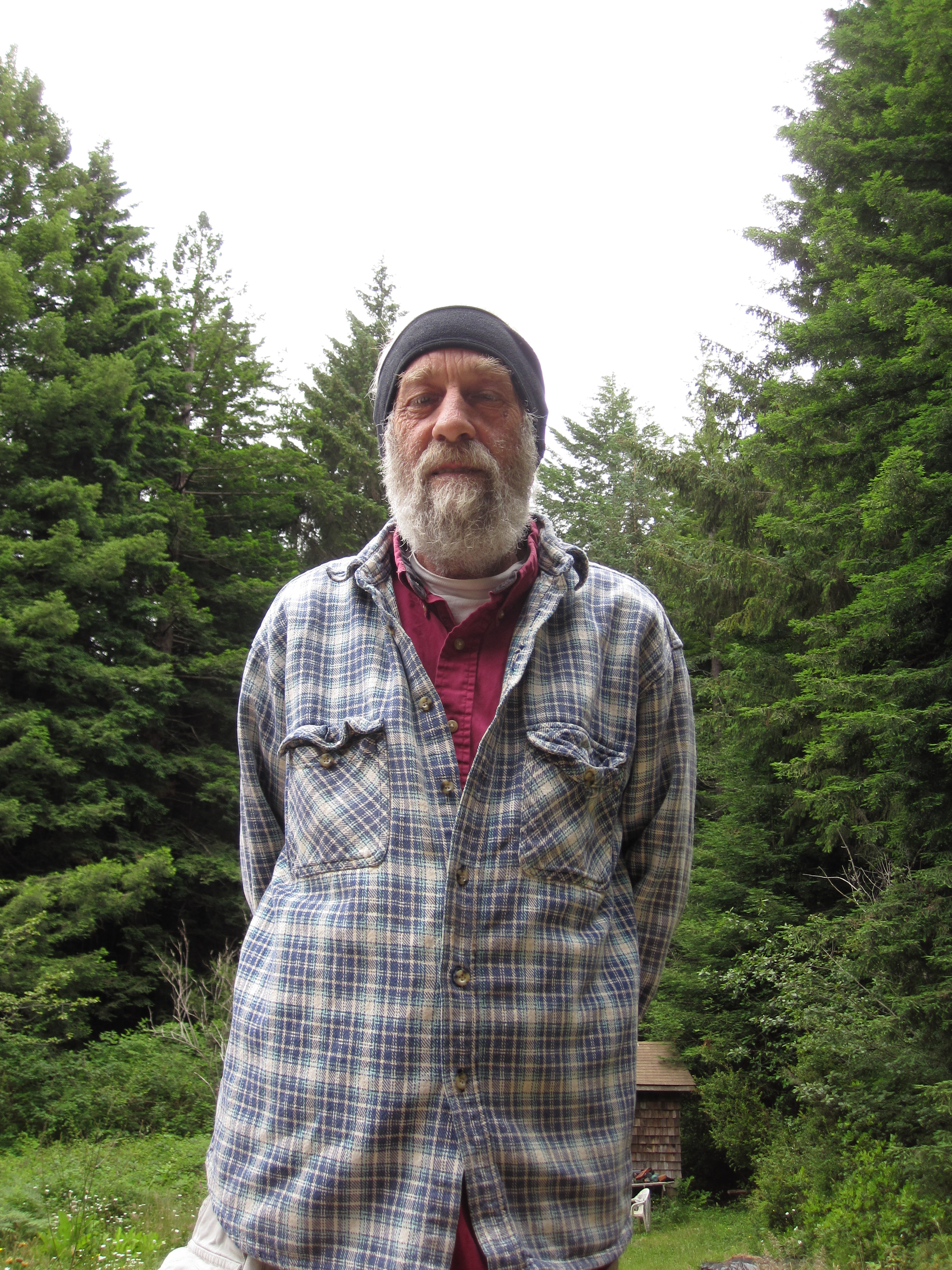
- Born: 11 November 1936 (age 89); London, England
- Occupations: Poet; editor; musician; film personality
- Spouse: 3
- Children: 5
- Parent(s): George Fles, Pearl Rimel
- Relatives: Louis Fles, Barthold Fles, Bart Berman, Helen Berman, Thijs Berman, Giorgio van Straten
- Writing career
- Period: 1959–1995
- Genres: poetry, fiction, non-fiction
- Notable work: Beyond the Beat Generation

Michael John Fles (born 11 November 1936), known both as John Fles and Michael Fles, is an American poet, editor, musician and film personality. Professor David James referred to him as "the single most important promoter of underground film" in Los Angeles.

== Early life ==
Michael John Fles was born to a Dutch father, George Fles, and a British mother, Pearl Rimel. As conscious communists, his parents had moved to the Soviet Union, where his father fell victim to Joseph Stalin's Great Purge. The mother, pregnant with Michael John, had left the Soviet Union to give birth in London. Mother and son later emigrated to the United States, where Pearl Rimel found employment in the aircraft industry. Michael John grew up in Los Angeles and Ojai, California, where he graduated from the Ojai Valley School in 1950.

== Career ==
=== Beat poet and editor ===
Fles studied philosophy at the University of Chicago, but did not graduate. While a student, he became the managing editor of the Chicago Review. In 1959 Fles was involved in the founding of the influential literary magazine Big Table. Later he was the editor of The Trembling Lamb, a one shot literary magazine that published Antonin Artaud's "Van Gogh: The Man Suicided by Society", LeRoi Jones's "The System of Dante's Inferno", and Carl Solomon's "Danish Impasse". In 1960 and 1961 he was a managing and contributing editor of Kulchur. During all these years he published his poetry far and wide.

=== Film personality and musician ===
In October 1963 he founded the Movies Round Midnight program at the Cinema Theatre at 1122 N. Western Ave. in Los Angeles, along with Mike Getz. He ran the program until 1965. From 1962 and into the 1980s he wrote over a dozen movie scripts, usually with co-authors.

Since, Fles has been active as a musician and music therapist, in the US, Canada, Mexico, and Israel. He lives in Trinidad, California and is now retired.

== Bibliography ==
=== Poetry ===
- 1957 – Arrow-less Alleys (Three Penny Press)
- 1957 – Beat and Beatific (Three Penny Press), with Gene Maslow
- 1958 – Testament (Three Penny Press)
- 1959 – Lawrence Lies Crucified (Three Penny Press)
- 1964 – Doon Glyn, Summer 1963 (self-published)

=== Fiction ===
- 1958 – The Man Who Lived Underground (unpublished screenplay), with John Evans after a story by Richard Wright

=== Nonfiction ===
- 1960 – "The End of the Affair, or Beyond the Beat Generation", Village Voice 6 (8) (15 Dec): 4, 12.
- 1960 – "The Root", Kulchur 1960 (Spring): 39–41
- 1961 – "The Great Chicago Poetry Reading", Swank 8 (1) (March) 65–68, 70.
- 1961 – "Uncle Bill Burroughs' Guided Tour: Naked Lunch", Swank 8 (3) (July): 50.
- 1963 – Fles, John (2015). "Personal State Meant". In Hyman, Adam; James, David E. (eds.). Alternative Projections: Experimental Film in Los Angeles, 1945-1980. Indiana University Press. pp. 41–42. ISBN 978-0-86196-909-8. Project MUSE chapter 1533979.
- 1963 – "Are Movies Junk?", Film Culture 29, republished as Fles, John (2015). "Seeing Is Believing". In Hyman, Adam; James, David E. (eds.). Alternative Projections: Experimental Film in Los Angeles, 1945-1980. Indiana University Press. pp. 53–60. ISBN 978-0-86196-909-8. Project MUSE chapter 1533981.
- 1964 – Fles, John (2015). "Seeing Is Believing". In Hyman, Adam; James, David E. (eds.). Alternative Projections: Experimental Film in Los Angeles, 1945-1980. Indiana University Press. pp. 53–60. ISBN 978-0-86196-909-8. Project MUSE chapter 1533981.
- 1995 – "Sound Wave Mirror", chapter 11 in Kenny CB (editor): Listening, Playing, Creating: Essays on the Power of Sound. Albany, New York: State University of New York Press.
