= Gérard Mfuranzima =

Burundian journalist

Gérard Mfuranzima is a Burundian journalist. From 2011 to 2015 he was the Burundian representative for the Association of European Parliamentarians with Africa.

== Career ==
From 1985, Mfuranzima was a journalist at the Burundi National Radio and Television (RTNB), and was twice Director of National Radio (1993–1995 and 2003–2006). He was expected to assist the Minister of Information in communications and public relations between Parliament and Government, and was government Chief of the Cabinet from 2009 to 2010.

He is also known for teaching young journalists in Burundi. He uses his wide experience in journalism and communication, having worked as the local correspondent in Bujumbura for Radio France Internationale and Radio Vatican (1990–1995), and contributor to the Bulletin d'Information Africaine (BIA, "African News Bulletin") and for the Syfia International news agency.

He is the author of several communication strategies, including the fight in Burundi against small arms and light weapons (2007), the first government pension scheme (2008), and strategic three-year plans for the Conseil National de Communication ("National Communication Council", CNC) of Burundi (2009–2011; 2012–2014).

In March 2016, Mfuranzima became responsible for the Unité de Gestion Gouvernance (Government Management Unit) under the Security Sector Development programme, created out of a memorandum of understanding of April 2009 between Burundi and the Netherlands.
