= Louis Fles =

Dutch businessman, activist and author

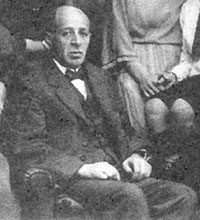
- Born: Levie Jacob Fles; 19 October 1871; Maassluis, Netherlands
- Died: 24 May 1940 (aged 68); Amsterdam, Netherlands
- Occupations: Businessman, author, activist
- Spouse: Zipporah Celine van Straaten
- Children: Mina, Rosine, Henriette, Clara, Barthold, George
- Relatives: Michael John Fles (grandson); Bart Berman (grandson); Helen Berman (w. of grandson); Thijs Berman (great-grandson); Giorgio van Straten (wife's grandnephew)
- Writing career
- Pen name: Dr. W. Bottema C.Az.
- Period: 1918–1939
- Genre: non-fiction
- Subjects: Jewish assimilation, anti-Zionism, Nazism, business
- Notable works: Forbidden radio-speech Hitler, reformer or criminal Away with Zionism!

Levie Jacob "Louis" Fles (19 October 1872 – 24 May 1940) was a Dutch businessman, activist and author. He is best known for writing and broadcasting against Zionism, Nazism, and organized religion. A self-described freethinker, Fles was a vocal supporter of Humanism and Jewish assimilation. His relationship with the Dutch Social Democratic Workers' Party was more problematic. While he generally supported the ideals of socialism, he wrote extensively about his disagreements with the party as well. After a life filled with personal tragedy and devotion to political and social activism, Fles committed suicide in May 1940, only a few weeks after the German occupation of the Netherlands.

== Family life ==
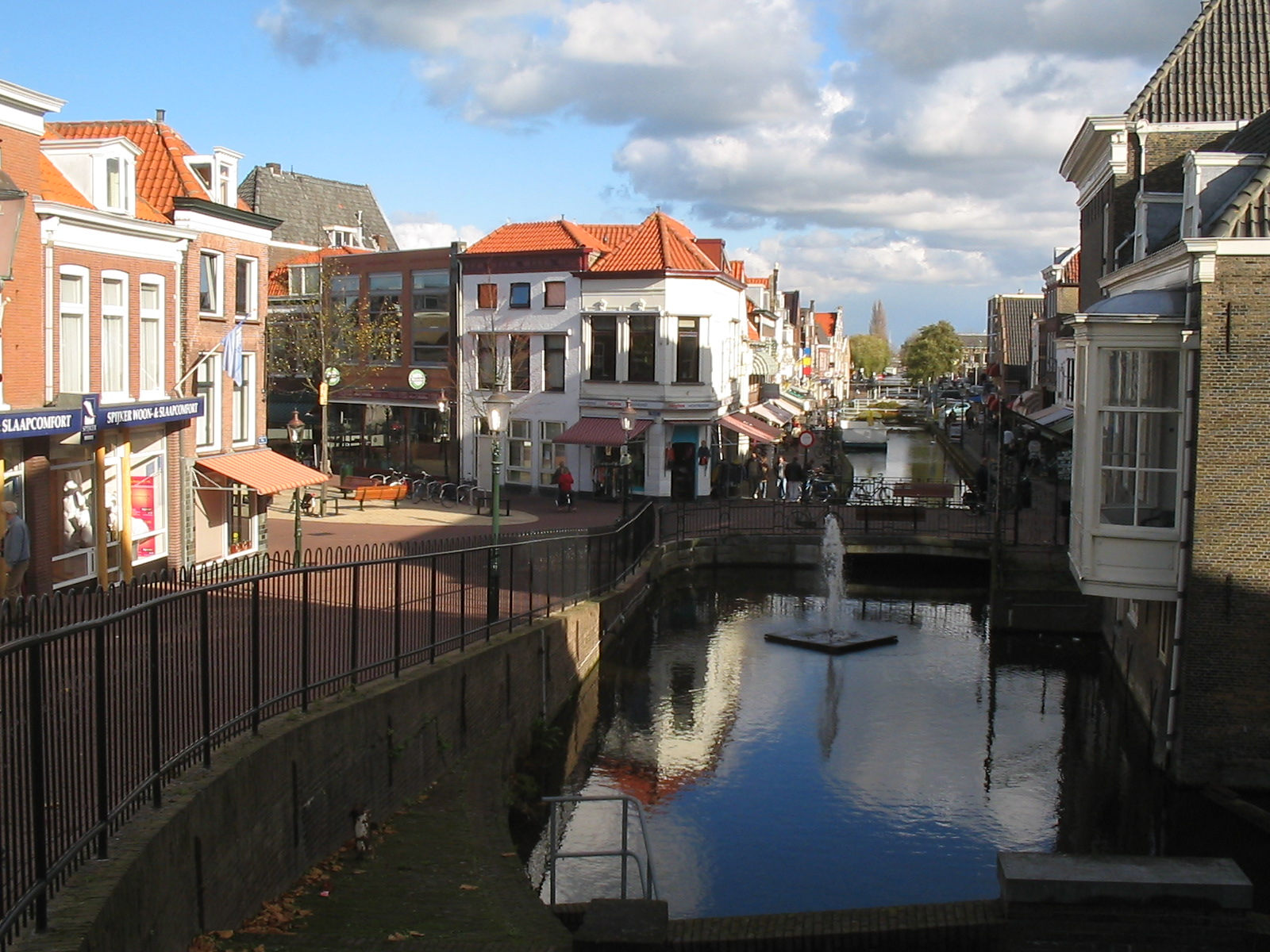
Maassluis Center

Louis Fles was born in Maassluis, Netherlands on 19 October 1871 to Jewish parents. His father, Jacob Levie Fles, worked as a diamond cutter, and his mother, Saartje van Blijdestein, ran a hosiery shop, placing young Louis squarely in the newly expanding merchant class. After his father died in 1873 his mother married a man named Swaab. Upon his mother's death in 1878, Louis was taken in and raised by his stepfather's family. As a successful business owner himself, Swaab took the young Louis into his company shortly after the boy had completed primary school.

On 13 August 1896 Fles married Zipporah van Straten in the city of Rotterdam. They had six children; Mina, Rosine, Henriette, Clara, Barthold, and George. Barthold became a successful literary agent in New York City in the United States. George worked as a translator in the Soviet Union during the regime of Joseph Stalin. In 1938 George was arrested as a political dissident due to his Trotskyist sympathies. Upon hearing of George's arrest, Louis travelled to Moscow, but was unable to find his son before his visa expired. George died in prison in 1939. Around this same time news arrived from the United States that daughter Rosine had died shortly after giving birth.

Fles was widely known as an opponent of Nazism when the German army occupied the Netherlands in May 1940. Even so, it was a shock to many of his family members when, on 25 May 1940, Fles committed suicide by means of pills acquired from a pharmacist in Keppel. He was buried in Amsterdam in Zorgvlied Cemetery.

== Business ==
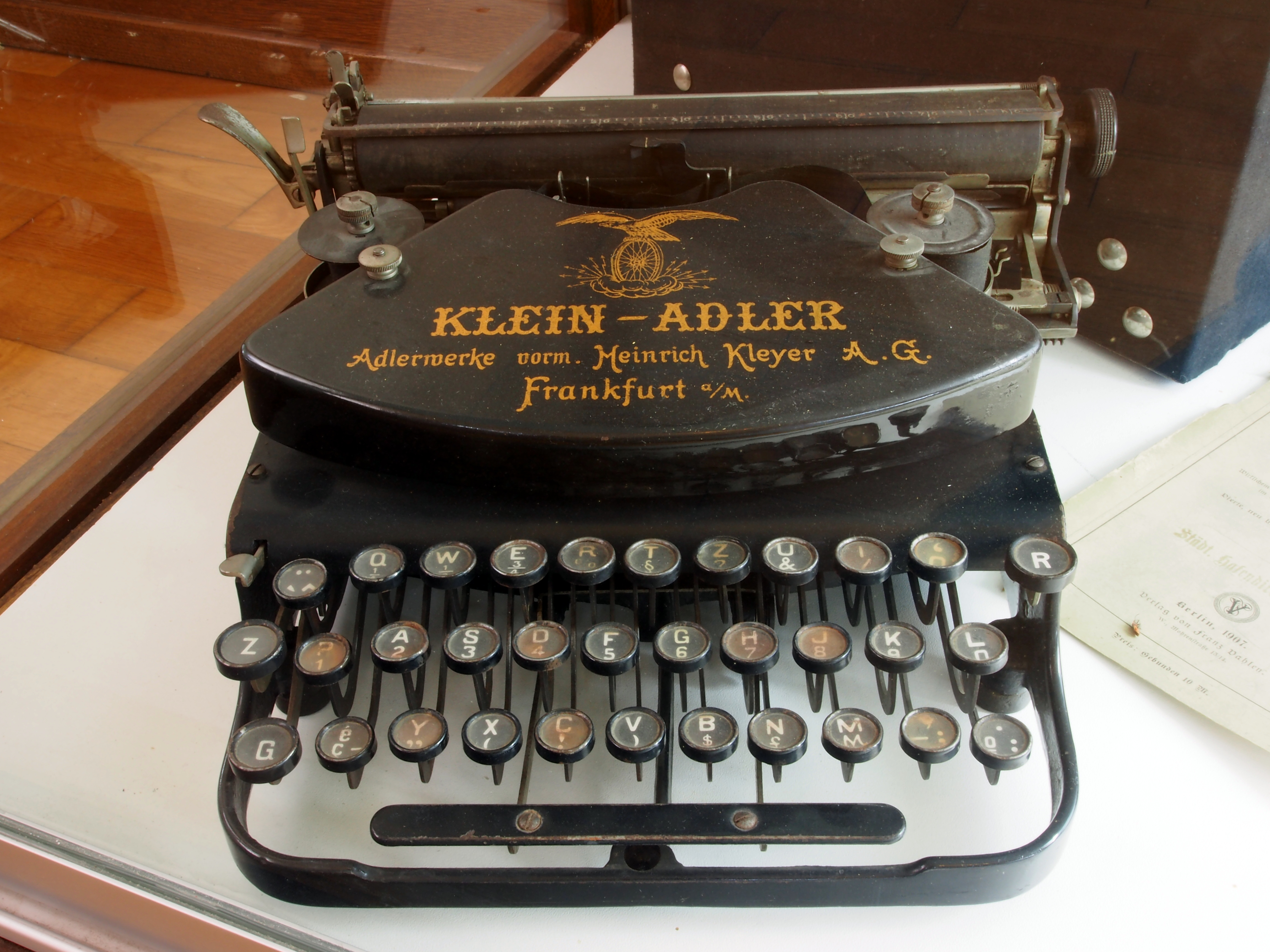
Museum Wilhelmsbau, Klein-Adler typewriter

Fles began working in his stepfather's office shortly after completing primary school. Soon, however, he went into business for himself. He gave lessons in French, English, and German before passing the accounting examination. This allowed him to become a bookkeeper for the Bank of Amsterdam.

With these experiences as a foundation, Fles soon founded his own company. Fles & Company had many interests, all related to serving the needs of other businesses. These included advertising and publishing, as well as the import and sale of high-end German-made Adler typewriters. The addition of a highly successful line of office furniture helped the company expand and establish branch offices throughout the Netherlands.

The rise of Nazism in Germany presented both moral and practical problems for the importer of German goods. In 1933, Fles published the brochure Hitler, hervormer of misdadiger? (Hitler, reformer or criminal?) in which he called for a boycott on the importation of all German goods. Fles sold his business and retired in 1934.

== Activism ==
=== Writing ===
Fles' earliest published pamphlets, Is in de moderne boekhouding plaats voor het copieboek? (Can copybooks serve a function in modern accounting?) (1918) and Efficiency (1922), were both related to the world of business. However, Louis Fles is better known for his extensive writings on politics, religion, and education. As early as 1917, De Groene Amsterdammer printed his criticism of the way Social Democratic Workers' Party (SDAP) allowed churches to influence the Dutch educational system. In this article, he accused the SDAP of having "sacrificed children to politics".

Later writings continued to criticize both political and religious authorities. In Kalenderhervorming, Sjabbat en Kerk (Calendar Reform, Shabbat and Church) (1930), Fles first observed that clinging to cultural and religious practices that set Jewish people apart from the surrounding Dutch culture served to feed the anti-Semitic narrative of Jews as foreigners. He then went on to propose alternative activities families might engage in, such as visiting a museum or other educational pursuits and admonished his reader, "durf vrij te denken", "Dare to think freely." He expanded upon these ideas in Water en vuur (Water and Fire) (1931). Religion, Fles wrote, was as antithetical to socialism as water was to fire. Here Fles repeated his accusation that the government deferred too much to religious—particularly Catholic—authorities, especially in the area of children's education.

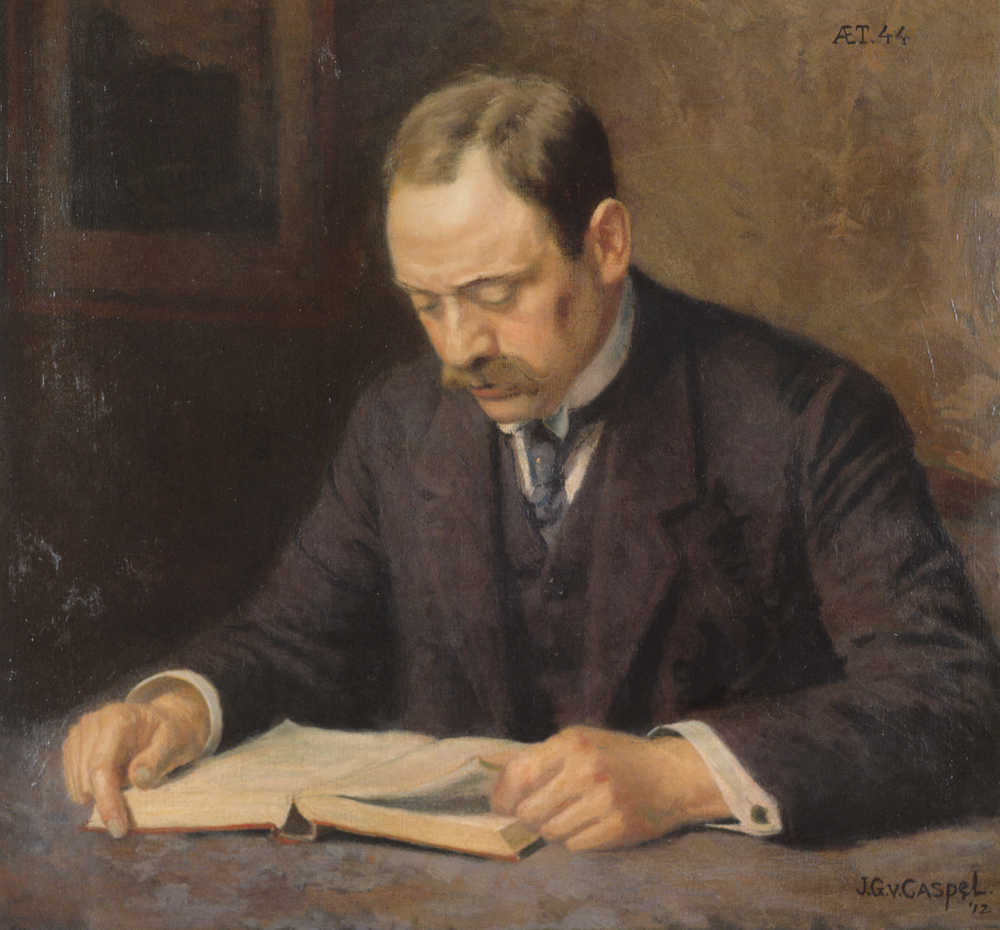
Henri Polak painted by Johan van Caspel (1912)

In 1933 Fles used a pseudonym, Dr. W. Bottema C. Az, to publish Hitler, hervormer of misdadiger? (Hitler, reformer or criminal?). Here Fles enumerated and described the treatment of Jewish people under the Nazi regime, and declared that "every relationship with Germany, in the area of commerce, art, science, sports and traffic should be discontinued, so that Germany is economically and otherwise crushed." Fles would later put this sentiment into practice. He sold his business that depended largely upon selling imported German merchandise, and, in 1936, served on the planning committee for De Olympiade Onder Dictatuur (The Olympiad under Dictatorship), which served as counter to the summer Olympics being held in Berlin.

Additionally, Fles carried on correspondences with other leading thinkers of his day, including an extended debate with Henri Polak regarding the nature of socialism and Fles' determined opposition to Zionism. Fles felt himself to be Dutch, and saw Zionism as further separating Jews from their non-Jewish Dutch neighbors while reinforcing the image of the Jew as a foreigner. Instead, Fles favored assimilation into the cultures in which Jews found themselves. He endorsed mixed marriages to accelerate this process. Fles gathered many of his thoughts from this correspondence into the 1939 pamphlet Weg met het zionisme! (Down with Zionism!).

=== Broadcasting ===
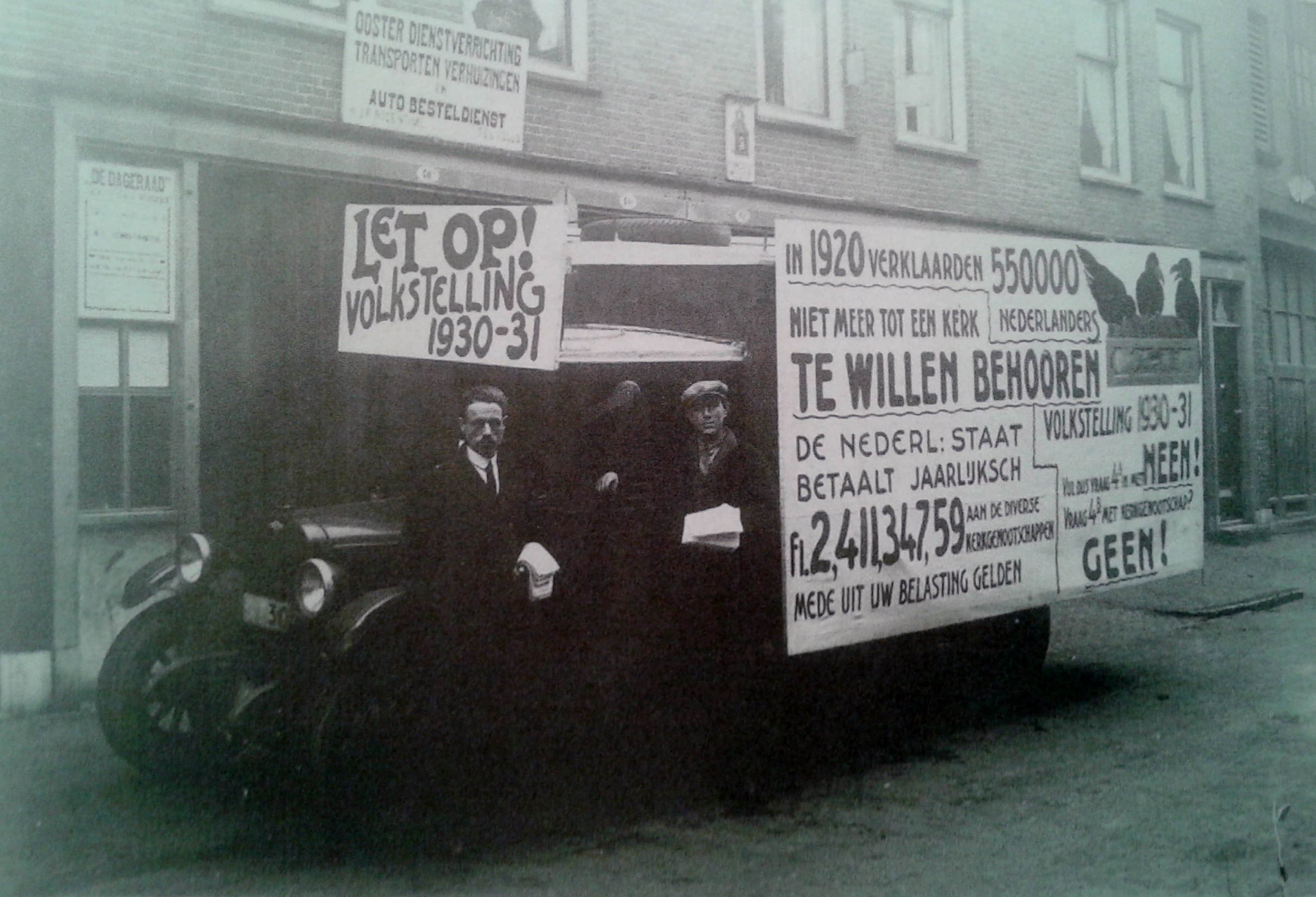
Action by Rotterdam freethinkers of De Dageraad against the 1930 census. The goal was to persuade people to have themselves registered as "unchurched" and "not religious", and thus reduce public subsidy of church associations. Text left sign: "Caution! 1930–31 Census" Text right sign: "In 1920, 550,000 Dutch people declared they no longer wanted to belong to a church. The Dutch state annually pays 2,411,347.59 guilders to all the church associations, also from your tax money. 1930–31 Census. So fill in Question 4A with NO! Question 4B with church association? NONE!"

Fles became involved with Vrijdenkers Radio Omroep (VRO) (Freethinkers Radio Broadcasting), which had been established in 1928 as an outreach program of the freethinkers' association De Dageraad (The Dawn). In 1929, the newly established Dutch Radio Broadcasting Control Commission labeled the group's material as subversive, and began to monitor its broadcasts closely. Fles' radio speech Los van de kerk (Free from the Church) was banned altogether, and many other broadcasts were censored for their subversive content, although they later found an audience in print form.

In 1933 Fles challenged the secretary of the Radio Broadcasting Control Commission regarding the lack of support VRO received from the government. He pointed out that the 1930 census had shown that the number of "unchurched" citizens had risen sharply, and, since this was VRO's intended audience, it should receive commensurate support. However, in that same year broadcast content restrictions were sharply tightened and, in 1936, VRO's broadcasting license was revoked. However, documents from the organization show that Fles was elected to the VRO's general board, showing that the organization continued to work toward regaining the right to broadcast.

=== The Olympiad Under Dictatorship ===
When the 1936 Olympic games in Berlin were declared off limits to Jews and other groups that the Nazi government deemed undesirable, Fles was among a group of Dutch businessmen and politicians who organized De Olympiade Onder Dictatuur ("The Olympiad Under Dictatorship") both to showcase the artists of the Netherlands and to protest the policies of the Third Reich. Organizers of the exhibition included Fles' friend and correspondent Henri Polak, as well as other left-leaning Dutch leaders. The committee made it clear that their exhibition was as much about protesting the Nazis' manipulation of the arts and sciences for political purposes as it was about showcasing Dutch excellence. Artists from neighboring countries and even German artists who had fled the Nazi regime were invited to participate. The initials of the name itself spell out D.O.O.D, or "death" in Dutch.

The travelling exhibition opened on 1 August 1936 amid much controversy. In Amsterdam, the use of public buildings was prohibited, and in Rotterdam, the show was closed down after only a few days. Nineteen works were considered by the Dutch government to be too insulting to Hitler and were removed from display. The German consul himself characterized the event as "sheer provocation", showing that the committee's efforts had not escaped official German notice. Many of the organizers and participants went to prison or were executed after German forces occupied the Netherlands in 1940.

In 1996, in celebration of the 60th anniversary of the D.O.O.D., the Amsterdam Municipal Archives allowed a number of the works from the original exhibition to be displayed at the Sports Museum in Berlin, Germany.

== Published works ==
- Is in de moderne boekhouding plaats voor het copieboek? (Can copybooks serve a function in modern accounting?) (1918)
- Efficiency (1922)
- Kalenderhervorming, sabbath en kerk (Calendar Reform, Sabbath and Church) (1930)
- Mijn antwoord aan opperrabbijn I. Maarssen (My Answer to Chief Rabbi I. Maarssen) (1930)
- De schuldbekentenis van de SDAP (The Confession of the SDAP) (1930)
- Water en vuur (Water and Fire) (1931)
- Onderwijs zonder godsdienst (Education without Religion) (1932)
- Open brief aan den heer J.F. Ankersmit te Amsterdam (Open Letter to Mr. J.F. Ankersmit Amsterdam) (1932)
- Hitler, hervormer of misdadiger? (Hitler, Reformer or Criminal?) (1933)
- Een verboden radiorede: Los van de kerk (A Forbidden Radio Speech: Free from the Church) (1933)
- Godsdienst, openbare school en zionisme (Religion, Public School and Zionism) (1935)
- Weg met het zionisme! (Down with Zionism!) (1939)
