= Miet Smet =

Belgian politician (1943–2024)

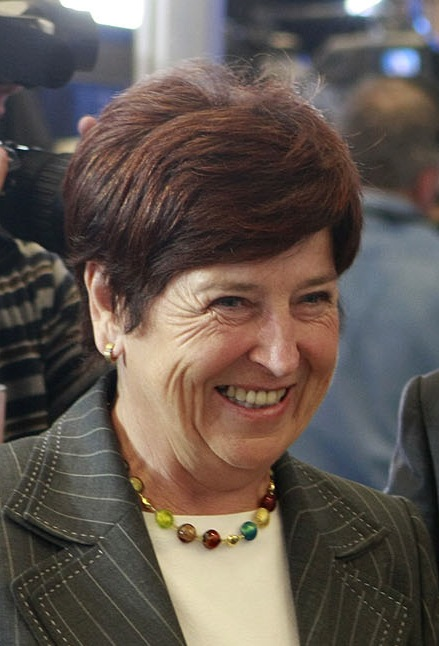
- Smet in 2009

Senator
- In office 12 July 2007 – 30 June 2009

Member of the Flemish Parliament
- In office 3 October 2004 – 6 June 2009

Member of the European Parliament
- In office 7 August 1999 – 7 August 2004

Personal details
- Born: 5 April 1943 Sint-Niklaas, German-occupied Belgium
- Died: 19 December 2024 (aged 81)
- Party: Christen-Democratisch en Vlaams
- Spouse: Wilfried Martens (m. 2008; died 2013)
- Committees: President and Chair of AWEPA
- Website: www.mietsmet.be

Miet Smet (5 April 1943 – 19 December 2024) was a Belgian politician for the Christian Democratic and Flemish party (CD&V).

== Career ==
In 1988, Smet became the president of the European Centre for Workers' Questions, a position which she held till 1995.

=== Career in national politics ===
Smet was the founder (1973), and first president (until 1982) of the Christian People's Party political women's organisation, Vrouw en Maatschappij (Woman and Society).

She was elected to the Belgian Chamber of People's Representatives in 1978. In 1985, she became State Secretary of Environmental Affairs, and negotiated an Equal Opportunities portfolio. While Smet's competencies cover all aspects of social emancipation, she focused on violence against women, women's economic position and their participation in decision-making. When Smet became Minister of Labour and Employment in 1991, she kept the Equal Opportunities portfolio.

=== Member of the European Parliament ===
When she was offered first place in the CD&V list for the European elections in 1999 instead of Wilfried Martens, Martens, at the instigation of then-wife Ilse Schouteden, refused to run at all.

Miet Smet was a Member of the European Parliament from 1999 to 2004.

She became a Minister of State in 2002, and has been a member of the Flemish Parliament from 2004 to 2009, and a Belgian senator between 2007 and 2010.

In 2009, Smet was elected president of the Association of European Parliamentarians with Africa (AWEPA), taking over from former president Dr. Jan Nico Scholten.

== Personal life and death ==
On 27 September 2008, Miet married fellow CD&V politician and former Belgian Prime Minister Wilfried Martens. After the death of Martens' first wife, Lieve Verschroeven, the marriage was confirmed in the Catholic Church on 27 April 2013.

Miet died on 19 December 2024, at the age of 81.

== Other activities ==
- Wilfried Martens Centre for European Studies, Member of the Academic Council

== Honours ==
- 2002 : Minister of state by Royal Decree.
- 2004 : Grand Officer in the Order of Leopold.
- 2002 : Dame Grand Cross in the Order of Merit of the Federal Republic of Germany.
