= Association of European Parliamentarians with Africa =

International parliamentary association

The Association of European Parliamentarians with Africa (AWEPA) is an international parliamentary association that is strictly non-partisan, founded by European parliamentarians in 1984. In cooperation with African parliaments, AWEPA works to strengthen parliamentary democracy in Africa, keep Africa high on the political agenda in Europe, and facilitate African-European parliamentary dialogue.

With its roots in the campaign to end apartheid in South Africa, AWEPA now works in Africa from a development perspective to strengthen the core functions of parliaments: oversight, representation and legislation.

AWEPA has some 1500 current and former European parliamentarians as members from the European Parliament, almost all member states of the European Union, Norway, Switzerland, and the United Kingdom. AWEPA has two offices in the European cities of Brussels and its headquarters in Amsterdam; and 9 African offices in Arusha, Bujumbura, Cape Town, Juba, Kampala, Kigali, Kinshasa, Maputo, and Nairobi.

== Founder ==
In 1984, Jan Nico Scholten took the initiative for the foundation of AWEPAA, the Association of West European Parliamentarians for Action against Apartheid. He sought to coordinate at the international level the struggle against the apartheid regime in South Africa. As President of AWEPAA he travelled through Europe and to the United States and Canada to stimulate support for sanctions.

== History ==
Since its founding in 1984, AWEPAA has worked by implementing parliamentary capacity building programmes in Africa. The organisation's primary orientation, being established for and by parliamentarians,

The first AWEPA conference

was to mobilise politicians, from democratically elected European parliaments, against apartheid. The organization grew from a small group of members in 16 national parliaments and in the European Parliament in September 1985, to some 1000 members in the early 1990s. Parliamentarians ensured effective sanction policies by passing laws, they monitored the implementation of these laws, and they sought to hold governments accountable for their policies.

After the apartheid regime was voted out in South Africa, AWEPAA broadened its mission: to promote democracy, peace, human rights, and democratic governance in Africa. With apartheid over, AWEPAA was renamed 'The Association of European Parliamentarians for Africa' (AWEPA) in 1993, and has since grown to some 1500 members.

Parliamentarians from Central and Eastern Europe began to join AWEPA in the early 1990s, and AWEPA developed into a non-partisan organization with members in parliaments all over Europe. Its political objective is to strengthen parliamentary democracy in Africa, to maintain an effective lobby to keep Africa on the political agenda in Europe, and to improve European-African relations.

During the 1990s, AWEPA became active in areas such as election observation and parliamentary and democratic capacity building at regional, national, provincial and local levels in Southern, Central, and Eastern Africa. Since 2000, AWEPA has also become involved in West Africa and the Horn of Africa, responding to emerging needs in these areas. Thematically, AWEPA activities promote the achievement of the Millennium Development Goals in Africa, including such areas as poverty reduction, women and children's rights, HIV and AIDS, and peace and security.

== Programmes ==
AWEPA's activities are divided into programs that either take an institutional focus, or programs that are more thematic in nature. At the institutional level, AWEPA works with African parliaments at a national, regional, or continental level as well as decentralized local authorities. Thematic programmes are programmes that carry a theme informing parliamentarians and mobilizing parliamentary action on specific issues through conferences, exchanges and publications.

=== Institutional programmes ===
AWEPA Programme Countries

AWEPA currently works with 25 parliaments in Africa through jointly agreed capacity building programmes. These include national parliaments, continental parliamentary institutions such as the Pan-African Parliament or the East African Legislative Assembly (EALA), as well as decentralised authorities.

In addition to working in countries with established parliamentary system, AWEPA also works in post-conflict countries. Strengthening the role of parliament in promoting peace, reconciliation and good governance are strong elements of the capacity building programmes in these countries. Representatives from other countries in Central and Eastern Africa and from countries in Western Africa regularly participate in AWEPA's regional and international activities. AWEPA has also become an active partner with NEPAD and has a number of MoU's in operation.

AWEPA Institutional Programmes include: Pan-African Parliament, East African Legislative Assembly, Réseau de Femmes Parlementaires d'Afrique Centrale, Parliament of the Democratic Republic of the Congo, Parliament of Rwanda, Parliament of Burundi, Parliament of Kenya, Parliament of Uganda, Parliament of Somalia, Parliament of Mozambique, The South Africa Provincial Legislatures (SAPL) Support Programme, The South Sudan Legislative Assembly (SSLA), and the Stability Pact for the Great Lakes peace process.

=== Thematic programmes ===
Through thematic programmes, AWEPA informs and mobilizes parliaments to take action on developmental issues. Thematic programmes include:

- Famine in the Horn of Africa
- Female Genital Mutilation
- Strengthening Regional Parliaments towards Achieving The Millennium Development Goals
- Climate Change Mitigation
- Aid Effectiveness

=== Research ===
AWEPA conducts research and produces parliamentary handbooks and other tools. Recent publications include:

- Mark van Dorp, Jeff Balch, David Batali, Emmanuela Darious Lado, Paul Lado Demetry and Isaac Woja's "No Time To Waste: Sustainable Environmental Management in a Changing Southern Sudan", which looks at waste management and pollution; deforestation and unsustainable forest use; climate change, drought, desertification and flooding; the relationship between natural resources, environment and conflict; and potential solutions to environmental management.
- Jos Havermans' "A Parliamentarians' Handbook on The Small Arms Issue", which covers the impact small arms and light weapons have on the Great Lakes Region and the Horn of Africa and gives suggestions about how parliamentarians can address this problem.
- Alta Fölscher, Mokoro's "Safeguarding the Interests of the People: Parliamentarians and Aid Effectiveness", which sheds light on the issues surrounding the aid process.
- Prof. Luc Huyse's "All Things Pass Except the Past", which examines the impact of civil war on a country's national psyche.
- Lucia van den Bergh's "Why peace worked: Mozambicans look back", which examines the interaction between Mozambican leaders and a civil society anxious for peace

== Organisation ==
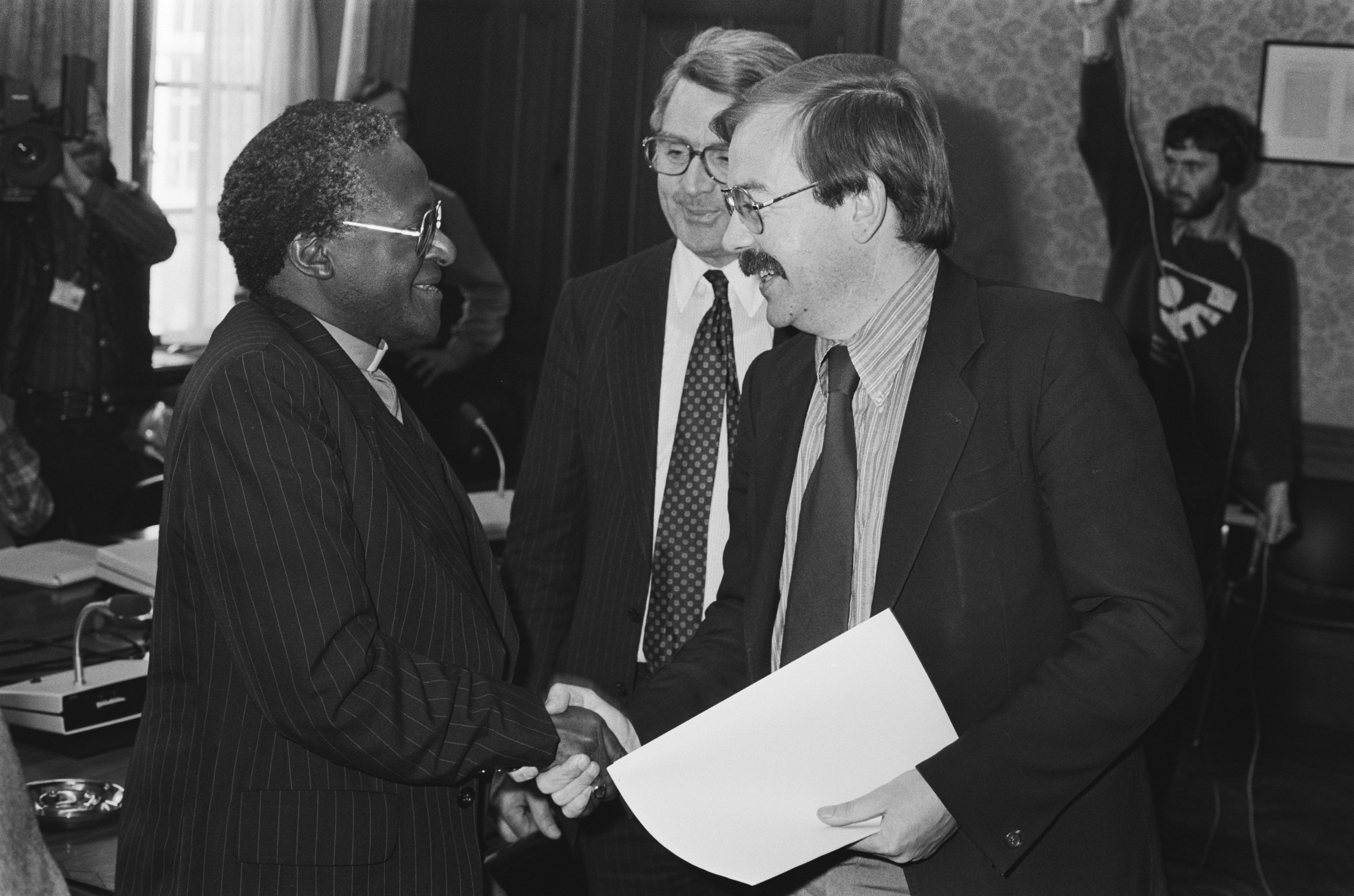
Archbishop Desmond Tutu and dr. Jan Nico Scholten

=== Eminent Advisory Board ===
Of special importance to AWEPA is its Eminent Advisory Board, which meets annually and advises AWEPA on wide-ranging policies regarding its work in Africa and Europe. In 2011, this Board was composed of Archbishop Desmond Tutu, Ms. Graça Machel, then Prof. Wangari Maathai (now Dr. Wangari Maathai), Ms. Mary Robinson, Dr. Jan Nico Scholten, His Excellency Mohamed A. Sahnoun, and Prof. Albert Tevoedjre.

=== Council and President ===
The highest political body within AWEPA is the council, which comprises representatives from the AWEPA sections in the European Parliament and the national parliaments of Europe. The Council elects the executive committee, which is accountable to the council. The President of the council, Miet Smet, is also member of the executive committee.

=== Executive Committee and Secretary-General ===
AWEPA's executive committee is the executive board of the organisation and meets four times a year. It is elected by the Governing Council for a period of five years to prepare and execute the policy of AWEPA. It is composed of the President and vice-presidents. AWEPA's president of the executive committee is Miet Smet of Belgium. AWEPA's Vice-president's are Maja Ingold of Switzerland, Jeppe Kofod of Denmark, Patrick Meinhardt of Germany, Olivia Mitchell of Ireland, Henk Jan Ormel of the Netherlands, Rosita Runegrund of Sweden, and Egidijus Vareikis of Lithuania.

=== Partnership Council ===
The AWEPA Partnership Council is an organ consisting of members of the AWEPA Eminent Advisory Board, AWEPA's main African partners, and the AWEPA Executive Committee. It is jointly chaired by the Chair of the Eminent Advisory Board, Ms. Graça Machel, and AWEPA President, Ms. Miet Smet. The parliaments which AWEPA supports are its primary partners and this cooperation is normally laid down in a Memorandum of Understanding. In the implementation of its programmes AWEPA also works together with a variety of other organisations to increase the impact of the programmes. Partners on the council include: Pan-African Parliament, East African Legislative Assembly, Economic Community of West African States, NEPAD Planning and Coordinating Agency, Network of African Parliamentarians, and the Southern African Development Community Parliamentary Forum.

=== Governing Council ===
The council operates as a general assembly for a five-year term and meets at least once a year. The Council decides on the overall policy of AWEPA and is chaired by the President, Ms. Miet Smet. The council is composed of the members of the executive committee, Dr. Jan Nico Scholten (Honorary President of AWEPA), and the following persons: Thijs Berman, Jan Willem Bertens, Sabine de Bethune, Katharine Bulbulia, Baron Chidgey, Ingrida Circene, Minodora Cliveti, John Corrie, Alain Destexhe, Luc Dhoore, Therese Frösch, Barty L. Fuchs, Theodossis Georgiou, Chantal Gill’ard, Pär Granstedt, Carina Hägg, Jan Hamáček, Johan van Hecke, Maja Ingold, Brunhilde Irber, Tadeusz Iwiński, Inge Jäger, Kimmo Kiljunen, Krista Kiuru, Karsten Lauritzen, Kerstin Lundgren, Josep Maldonado, Lydia Maximus, Silver Meikar, Magda de Meyer, Denis Naughten, Charlie O'Connor, Matthew Offord, Maria Antonia Moreno Areias De Almeida Santos, and Judith Schwentner.

=== European sections ===
AWEPA has built up a broad member network of European parliamentarians that are supportive of its work. Within the different parliaments in Europe, these members form a section. The European Sections seek to keep Africa high on the political agenda in Europe and facilitate African-European Parliamentary dialogue. AWEPA works to support its existing and new sections so that they may perform advocacy and support functions effectively and efficiently. By promoting African issues on the political agendas of the EU and separate EU member states and by lobbying on decision-making, AWEPA tries to contribute to more favourable and more coherent trade, aid, investment, and agricultural policies towards Africa. Current sections include: Austria, Belgium, Czech Republic, Cyprus, Denmark, Estonia, Finland, Flanders, France, Germany, Greece, Hungary, Ireland, Italy, Latvia, Lithuania, Malta, The Netherlands, Norway, Poland, Portugal, Romania, Slovakia, Slovenia, Spain, Sweden, Switzerland, United Kingdom and The European Parliament.

== Donors ==
The execution of the AWEPA programmes is made possible through the financial support a broad funding base composed of government agencies, NGO's, and INGO's. In particular, major 2010 donors include: ADA, the Belgian Government, DANIDA, the Danish Embassy in Maputo, GTZ, the European Commission, the Finnish Embassy in Maputo, Irish Aid, AIID, DGIS, MINIBUZA, NORAD, SIDA, Swiss - SAPL, UK - FCO, UK - NRIL, UK - AGRA, UNDP, UNICEF, and others.
