= Silver Meikar =

Estonian activist

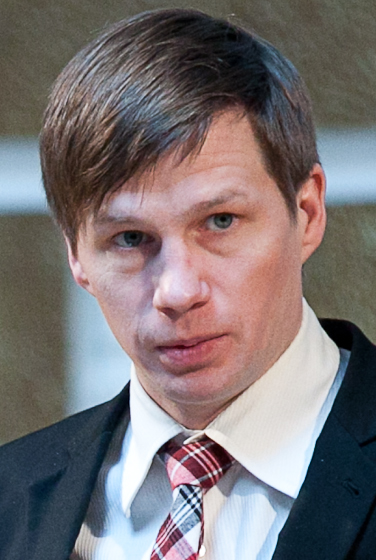
Silver Meikar in 2012

Silver Meikar (born February 12, 1978) is an Estonian human rights activist, a freelance journalist and founder of the Estonian Institute of Digital Rights. Silver Meikar was a member of the parliament of Estonia - Riigikogu in 2003-2004 and 2006-2011 in the Estonian Reform Party faction.

Silver Meikar was born in Tartu and received the basic and secondary school education in Tartu Miina Härma Gymnasium. He graduated from the University of Tartu with a degree in economics in 2005.

He served as a member of Tartu City Council in 1999 - 2002 and 2005 - 2006. In 2003 Silver Meikar became a substitute member of the parliament of Estonia as Margus Hanson became the minister of defence. Silver Meikar was set up as a candidate to the European Parliament in 2004. He lost his seat in Riigikogu as Margus Hanson was dismissed in November 2004 due to the theft of classified documents from his home. Silver Meikar re-gained his seat on November 23, 2006 as Margus Hanson was convicted for leaking state-classified data.

Silver Meikar was re-elected to Riigikogu on March 4, 2007 and he served throughout his mandate as a member of the Foreign Affairs Committee.

He became notable with political activities that encompass defending the Human rights in Belarus, Burma, China, Russia and elsewhere, drawing attention to the difficult situation in developing countries and supporting the reform process in Ukraine and Georgia. He has also been advocating for the respect of civil liberties in Estonia. Silver Meikar has been the protagonist of electronic voting and e-democracy in Estonia. He was the first Estonian politician to create a personal weblog.

Silver Meikar was a member of the AWEPA governing council in 2009-2011. He was a member of the bureau of the Liberal International in 2008-2011.

In May 2012 Meikar published an article, admitting that he had donated cash to Estonian Reform Party in 2009 and 2010, coming from unknown sources and given him by co-politician Kalev Lillo, according to a proposition made by Kristen Michal, Reform Party's secretary general. The scandal became known as Silvergate. Lillo and Michal were presented with criminal charges. After a long and heated discussion in media, charges were dropped, as it was not possible to gather enough evidence. On October 24, 2012, Meikar was expelled from the party. Consequently, Kristen Michal stepped down as the minister of justice.

In 2006 Silver Meikar published the book The Diary of the Orange Revolution ("Oranži revolutsiooni päevik" in Estonian) on the events in Ukraine from November 2004 to January 2005 when he was one of the observers of the presidential elections in Ukraine and later on a participant in the Orange Revolution.

His book Political Malaria. A View from Burma ("Poliitmalaaria. Pilk Birmast" in Estonian), discussing politics, culture and political culture, was published in 2013. In the book Silver Meikar is travelling in Burma, while unravelling the events that had taken place in the Estonian politics in previous years.

He published an article in "Russian Federation 2011: short-term prognosis" of the Academic Center for Baltic and Russian Studies on the relations between Belarus and Russia. He has published numerous articles in the Estonian media and is a regular contributor to Estonian daily newspapers Postimees, Eesti Päevaleht and the weekly Sirp.

Since December 2013 Silver Meikar has been covering the events of Euromaidan and its aftermath in Ukraine. He has contributed to Reporter of Kanal 2 and Eesti Päevaleht/Delfi (web portal), while following the situation in Kyiv, Crimea and cities of Eastern Ukraine unfolding on the spot.

The President of Estonia awarded Silver Meikar with the Order of the White Star, 4th class, in 2012 for standing consistently for human rights, civil liberties, democracy and the principles of a state based on the rule of law.

Silver Meikar is married and has 2 sons.
