= Tadeusz Iwiński =

Polish politician (born 1944)

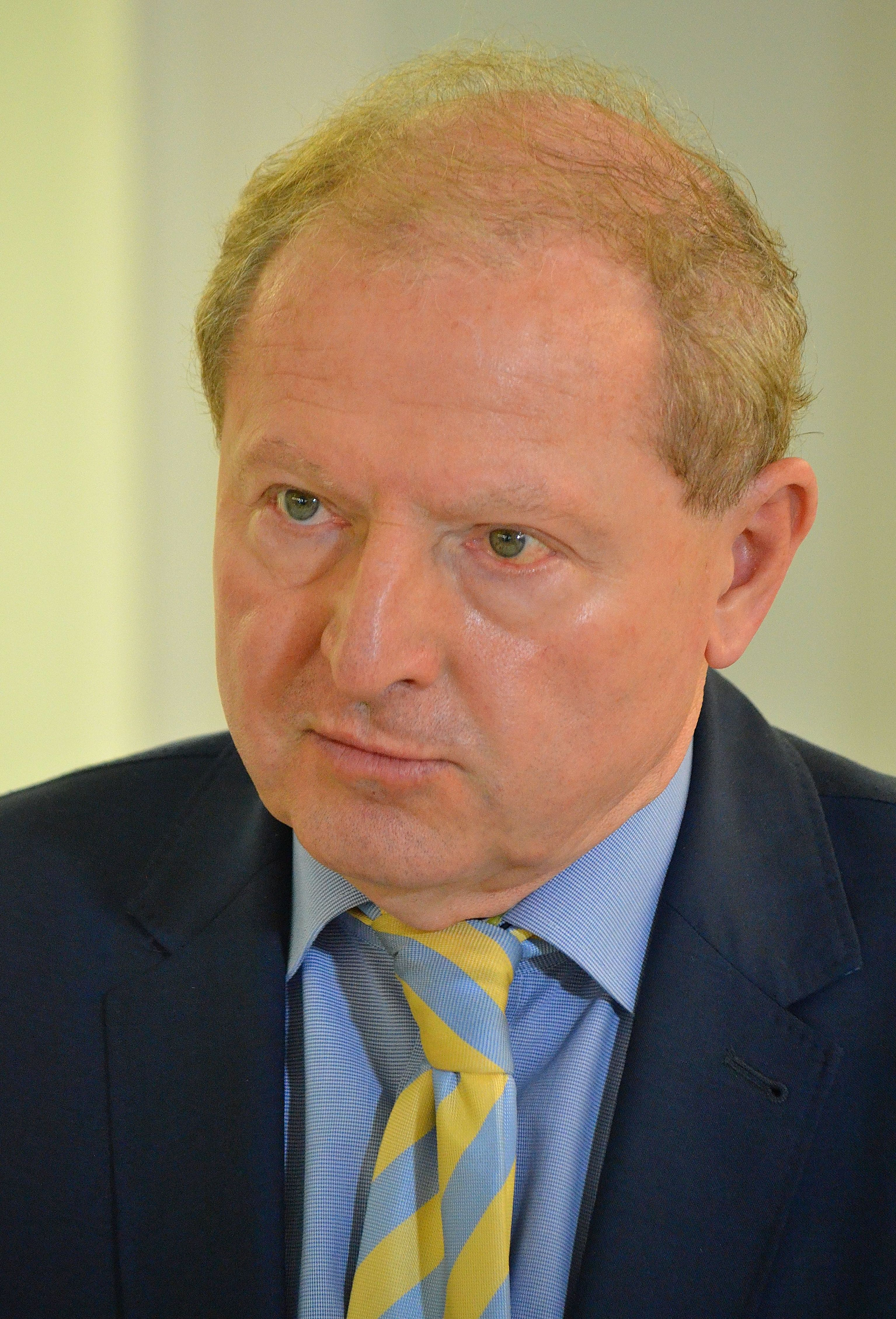

Member of the Sejm
- In office 25 November 1991 – 11 November 2015
- Constituency: 35 – Olsztyn

Personal details
- Born: October 28, 1944 (age 81) Piastów
- Party: Democratic Left Alliance
- Committees: AWEPA Governing Council

Tadeusz Iwiński (pronounced [taˈdɛ.uʂ iˈvij̃skʲi]; born 28 October 1944 in Piastow) is a Polish politician. He was from 1991 to 2015 a member of the Sejm (the lower house of the Polish parliament), elected to represent the Olsztyn electoral district from the list presented by the Democratic Left Alliance (Sojusz Lewicy Demokratycznej). He had earlier (1967–1990) been a long-serving member of the communist Polish United Workers' Party (Polska Zjednoczona Partia Robotnicza).

In 1968 Iwiński obtained an MSc in industrial chemistry from the Warsaw University of Technology and he later studied at the Faculty of Journalism and Political Science of the University of Warsaw. In 1973 he was awarded a PhD in International Affairs. In 1981, during the period of martial law introduced by the Jaruzelski government, Iwiński was appointed to the post of assistant professor at the Polish United Workers' Party Central Committee's Higher School of Social Science (Wyższa Szkoła Nauk Społecznych KC PZPR). In 1977–1978 he was a Fulbright Scholar (at Harvard University) and he obtained a second scholarship from the International Research & Exchanges Board (IREX). In the 1980s he was a scholar at the United Nations University in Tokyo. After returning to Poland he taught at the University of Warmia and Mazury in Olsztyn where, in 1999, he became a professor. Iwiński has been active in several scientific and political institutions concerned with African, Asian, and Oceanian affairs and studies. He was a member of The Committee on Political Science of the Polish Academy of Sciences. Iwiński is a serving member of the governing council of the Association of European Parliamentarians with Africa.

He has been a member of the Parliamentary Assembly of the Council of Europe since 1992. The investigation by the European Stability Initiative revealed Iwinski's engagement in Azerbaijani “Caviar Diplomacy”. Co-rapporteur on Azerbaijan in PACE in 2014-2015 he was one of the main apologists of the country systematically protecting the Azerbaijani government from criticism on human rights. He participated in parliamentary and presidential elections in Azerbaijan as an observer and issued reports which were significantly less critical than the findings of the OSCE/ODIHR observers. He lost in 2015 elections in Poland and is not PACE member anymore.

== Publications ==
Iwiński's publications include

- Współczesny neokolonializm – Contemporary neocolonialism – 1979 / 1986
- Burżuazyjne i emigracyjne próby deprecjacji roli i polityki PZPR (red.) – Bourgeois and exile attempts to depreciate the role and policy of the PZPR (ed.) – 1980–85
- Geneza, źródła i rola antykomunistycznej krucjaty w strategii i taktyce amerykańskiego imperializmu – Genesis, sources, and role of the anti-communist crusade in the strategy and tactics of American imperialism – 1983

== See also ==
- Members of the Polish Sejm 2005–2007
- Members of the Polish Sejm 2007–2011
- Members of the Polish Sejm 2011–2015
