= Rankin Barbee =

American journalist (1874–1958)

David Rankin Barbee
- Born: October 15, 1874; Murfreesboro, Tennessee, U.S.
- Died: March 7, 1958 (aged 83); Orange, Texas, U.S.
- Occupation: Journalist
- Writing career
- Genre: Non-fiction

David Rankin Barbee (October 15, 1874 — March 7, 1958) was an American journalist, a public relations writer for the Franklin D. Roosevelt administration, and a researcher in American history, best known for writing on Southern history. Barbee, known by his middle name Rankin, was descended from a powerful Tennessee political family.

== Biography ==
Barbee was born on October 15, 1874, in Murfreesboro, Tennessee. He attended high school in Nashville, Tennessee. Barbee then studied at Emory and Henry College and at Vanderbilt University. He later claimed that he never graduated from any school.

In 1896, Barbee became a journalist working for the Nashville Banner. He then worked for the Nashville American, the Memphis Commercial Appeal and the Mobile Register. Barbee served as editor and publisher of The Chattanooga Star and as news editor of the New Orleans States. He also worked as managing editor of the Montgomery Advertiser and, beginning in March 1926, the Asheville Citizen.

From 1928 to 1933, Rankin Barbee wrote the column "Profiles" in The Washington Post, earning him "a large and loyal audience". He joined the administration of President Franklin D. Roosevelt as a public relations writer for the Federal Alcohol Administration.

After his retirement in 1942, he became a full-time historic researcher, mostly writing on Southern history and on President Abraham Lincoln. He published articles in history magazines and books. He was represented by the literary agent Barthold Fles. Today his papers are held in the special collections of the Georgetown University Library.

Barbee died from stomach cancer at the age of 83 on March 7, 1958 in Orange, Texas. He had moved there from Washington, D.C. in his late 70s to live with one of his daughters. Barbee was buried at Cedar Hill Cemetery in Suitland, Maryland, on March 10.

== Family ==
Rankin Barbee was the son of Rev. Dr. James Barbee and Margaret Rankin of Jasper, Tennessee. He was the nephew of Tennessee Attorney General George J. Stubblefield and Federal District Judge William R. Rankin. Barbee Sr., was the Publishing Agent for the United Methodist Publishing House in the 1890s and pastor of McKendree Methodist Church at the same time. Rankin Barbee's mother and uncle had moved to Nashville during the Civil War to be closer to their sister, Mary Anne Rankin, and her husband George Stubblefield. The family's political fortunes were tied to its relationship with then Tennessee Governor and future President Andrew Johnson. Rankin Barbee's grandfather, David Rankin of Jasper, Tennessee, was born in Greeneville, Tennessee, and had served in the State legislature with Johnson in the 1830s. In addition, Johnson's maternal grandfather, Andrew McDonough, had married Barbee's great-grandmother, Rhoda Sartain Roberson, in his second marriage.

Barbee's family included first cousin Thomas Turley Rankin, who was head attorney for the Home Owners Loan Corporation and the War Assets Administration. Rankin's uncle William Roberson Rankin was a Federal District Judge in Nashville from 1863 to 1865.

On April 15, 1913, Barbee married Elina Gusman. They had two daughters.

== Bibliography ==
=== Books ===
- 1928 - An Excursion in Southern History
- 1930 - Washington, City of Mighty Events
- 1946 - Did James F. Shunk Forge the Cotton Mather Letter? The Answer Is: Definitely No.
- 1947 - The Capture of Jefferson Davis
- 1951 - Lincoln, Chase, and the Rev. Dr. Richard Fuller

=== Manuscripts ===
- The Inside Story of Lamon's Life of Lincoln
- Lincoln and Booth
- The Story of Mrs. Robert Greenhow (or The Nemesis of Abraham Lincoln)
