= George Fles =

Dutch translator

- Born: 1908; Amsterdam, Netherlands
- Died: 1939 (aged 30–31); Smolensk, Russia
- Other name: Sjoppie
- Occupation: translator
- Known for: Dutch victim of the Great Purge
- Spouse: Pearl Rimel
- Children: Michael John Fles
- Parent(s): Louis Fles (father); Celine van Straaten (mother)

George "Sjoppie" Fles (Russian: Георгий Людвигович Флэс, romanized: Georgiy Lyudvigovich Fles; 1908–1939) was a Dutch translator with a strong communist conviction. He fell victim to Stalin's repressions.

== Personal life ==
George was born in 1908 in Amsterdam, as the youngest son of Louis Fles and Celine van Straaten. He spent time in France and in the United Kingdom, where he married Pearl Rimel. With his newlywed wife, he moved to the Soviet Union.

== Career ==
In Moscow, he worked as a translator. Later he was sent to Tbilisi, Georgia, where he also worked as a translator. He was informally warned that he should leave, advice that he did not follow. He did send his pregnant wife back to England.

George was arrested and put on trial for espionage and Trotskyism. He was convicted of Trotskyism. As he was asthmatic his health deteriorated quickly in Russian prison. His father and his brother Barthold Fles tried to have him released but to no avail. He died on May 31, 1939, in a prison near Smolensk.

After George's death, Pearl Rimel and their son Michael John Fles emigrated to the United States and settled in Los Angeles. At the request of family members, the Soviet Union later "rehabilitated" George Fles.

== Biography ==
- Thijs Berman: Op zoek naar George Fles, het einde van een Hollandse revolutionair in de Sovjetunie (Dutch for Searching for George Fles, the end of a Dutch revolutionary in the Soviet Union). Amsterdam: Van Gennep, 1993. ISBN 90-6012-992-X

== Sources ==
- David Aaronovitch: "Stalin's British victims (book review)." New Statesman 16 August 2004.
- Francis Beckett: Stalin's British Victims. Phoenix Mill: Sutton, 2004. ISBN 0-7509-3223-6
- Giorgio van Straten: My name, a living memory. South Royalton, Vermont: Steerforth Italia, 2003. ISBN 1-58642-071-2
