= Jean Rikhoff =

American journalist

- Born: May 28, 1926; Chicago, Illinois
- Died: June 19, 2018 (aged 92); Glens Falls, New York
- Occupations: Author; editor; teacher
- Spouse(s): Rust Hills, Mark Branson
- Children: 2
- Writing career
- Period: Books published 1961–2011
- Genres: Historical fiction; children's literature; feminist literature
- Notable works: Timble trilogy (Dear Ones All, Voyage In, Voyage Out, and Rites of Passage) and the Buttes Landing-Sweetwater trilogy (Buttes Landing, One of the Raymonds, and Sweetwater)

Jean Marie Rikhoff (May 28, 1926 – June 19, 2018) was an American author and editor. She is best known for writing two trilogies: the Timble Trilogy, made up of Dear Ones All, Voyage In, Voyage Out, and Rites of Passage, and the trilogy of the North Country, consisting of Buttes Landing, One of the Raymonds, and The Sweetwater.

Rikhoff received a National Endowment for the Humanities fellowship, a Eugene Saxton fellowship in creative writing (1958), and two State University of New York creative writing fellowships. Two of her books were selected as book of the month alternates and her autobiography was selected Best Memoir of 2011 by the Adirondack Center for Writing.

== Life and work ==
Jean Rikhoff was born in Chicago, Illinois, and grew up in Indianapolis, Indiana. She received her B.A. in English from Mount Holyoke College in 1948 and completed graduate work in English and philosophy at Wesleyan University. Her dissertation was on The Classical Imagery in Christopher Marlowe's Plays.

Rikhoff then left for Europe where she traveled with her first husband and taught for seven years. During this time she wrote her first novel, Dear Ones All, in Seville. Back in the US, she settled with her young daughter in the Adirondack Mountains, first living in Bolton Landing.

In 1954 she established Quixote, a literary magazine, which she also edited. Rikhoff described the magazine as a financial failure, yet continued to publish until 1966. In Quixote she wrote an annual report called "Troubles of a Small Magazine". The collected reports were published by Grosset & Dunlap as the Quixote Anthology, along with selected works from the magazine.

In the meantime, she had started to work with literary agent Barthold Fles, who was of great support to her creative writing. Rikhoff remarried and spent 20 years on a horse farm in West Hebron, where she wrote some of her best known books. In 1983 she co-founded the Loft Press in Glens Falls, for which she served as publisher and editor of the Glens Falls Review. She also worked as an editorial assistant for Gourmet Magazine.

Rikhoff took up teaching again, now at the State University of New York's Adirondack Community College. Among others, she served as faculty advisor to Expressions, the literary magazine of the Adirondack students. At the time of her retirement she was the chair of the English Department at Adirondack College. For her teaching and academic leadership, she won the Adirondack Community College President's Award for Academic Excellence (1990) and State University of New York Chancellor's Award for Excellence in Teaching (1992).

Rikhoff died on June 19, 2018.

== Bibliography ==
=== Books written ===
- 1961 - Dear Ones All
- 1961 - Writing About the Frontier: Mark Twain
- 1963 - Voyage In, Voyage Out
- 1966 - Rites of Passage
- 1968 - Robert E. Lee, Soldier of the South
- 1973 - Buttes Landing (Book of the Month alternate)
- 1974 - One of the Raymonds (Book of the Month alternate)
- 1976 - The Sweetwater
- 1979 - Where Were You in '76?
- 1984 - David Smith, I Remember
- 2011 - Earth, Air, Fire, and Water: A Memoir (won Best Memoir 2011 by Adirondack Center for Writing)

=== Books edited ===
- 1961 - Quixote Anthology
- 1986 - North Country Anthology (co-editor)
