= Fanatic (film) =

1965 British film by Silvio Narizzano

- U.K. theatrical release poster
- Directed by: Silvio Narizzano
- Written by: Richard Matheson
- Based on: Nightmare (1961 novel) by Anne Blaisdell
- Produced by: Anthony Hinds
- Starring: Tallulah Bankhead; Stefanie Powers; Maurice Kaufmann; Peter Vaughan; Yootha Joyce; Donald Sutherland
- Cinematography: Arthur Ibbetson
- Edited by: John Dunsford
- Music by: Wilfred Josephs
- Production company: Hammer Film Productions
- Distributed by: Columbia Pictures
- Release date: 21 March 1965
- Running time: 97 minutes
- Country: United Kingdom
- Language: English

Fanatic (released in the United States as Die! Die! My Darling!) is a 1965 British horror thriller film directed by Silvio Narizzano in his feature directorial debut, written by Richard Matheson, and produced by Anthony Hinds for Hammer Film Productions. It stars Tallulah Bankhead (in her final feature film), Stefanie Powers, Peter Vaughan, Yootha Joyce, Maurice Kaufmann and Donald Sutherland.

Based on the 1961 novel Nightmare by Anne Blaisdell (pen name of Elizabeth Linington), the film is about a woman who is kidnapped by the deranged mother of her late fiancé. Fanatic is often characterized as part of the "psycho-biddy" subgenre.

The film was released in the United Kingdom by Columbia Pictures on 21 March 1965.

== Plot ==
An American woman, Patricia Carroll, arrives in England to marry her lover Alan Glentower. Before tying the knot, however, Patricia pays a visit to Mrs. Trefoile, the mother of her deceased fiancé Stephen, who died in an automobile accident several years earlier. Trefoile resides in a secluded house on the edge of an English village. She is fanatically religious, and it soon becomes apparent that she blames Patricia for her son's death. Indeed, when Patricia reveals to her that she never actually intended to marry Stephen, Trefoile enlists the aid of her servants, Harry and Anna, in holding Patricia captive so she can exorcise the young woman's soul. After several attempts to escape the Trefoile house, one of which nearly results in Patricia's being sexually assaulted by Harry, she is rescued by Alan; and in the end, Mrs. Trefoile winds up dead with a knife in her back, the same knife with which she earlier attempted to murder Patricia.

== Cast ==
- Tallulah Bankhead as Mrs. Trefoile
- Stefanie Powers as Patricia Carroll
- Peter Vaughan as Harry
- Maurice Kaufmann as Alan Glentower
- Yootha Joyce as Anna
- Donald Sutherland as Joseph
- Gwendolyn Watts as Gloria
- Robert Dorning as Ormsby
- Philip Gilbert as Oscar
- Winifred Dennis as Shopkeeper
- Diana King as Shopper
- Henry McGee as Rector

== Production ==
Fanatic was filmed at Elstree Studios and on location in Letchmore Heath, Hertfordshire, during the summer of 1964.

During production, Tallulah Bankhead's health issues and well-publicised substance usage caused difficulties, and producers considered replacing her. The recording of a single line of dialogue during a dubbing session reportedly took several hours. The episode was dramatized in the stage play Looped.

== Reception ==
=== Critical response ===
Variety wrote that the film "should click with fright fans," praising Narizzano's direction as "imaginative" and the script as having dialogue that was generally "fresher than most pix of its class" while giving Bankhead "numerous chances to display virtuosity, from sweet-tongued menace to maniacal blood-lust."

The Monthly Film Bulletin wrote: "Though uneven in tone (to put it mildly), this piece of extravagance is at least consistently enjoyable ... One suspects here a laudable determination in Miss Bankhead not to be outdone by Bette Davis' Baby Jane. Still, why cavil? There is enough here to give horror addicts a field day on various levels."

A. H. Weiler of The New York Times wrote that although Bankhead "towers above the cast and story, her present effort adds little to her record."

The film maintains a 50% rating on review aggregation website Rotten Tomatoes, based on 10 reviews.

== See also ==
- Looped, a 2010 Broadway play that uses the production of this film as its setting
- Psycho-biddy genre
- "Die, Die My Darling", 1984 single by punk band the Misfits which took its name from the American title
