= European Centre for Workers' Questions =

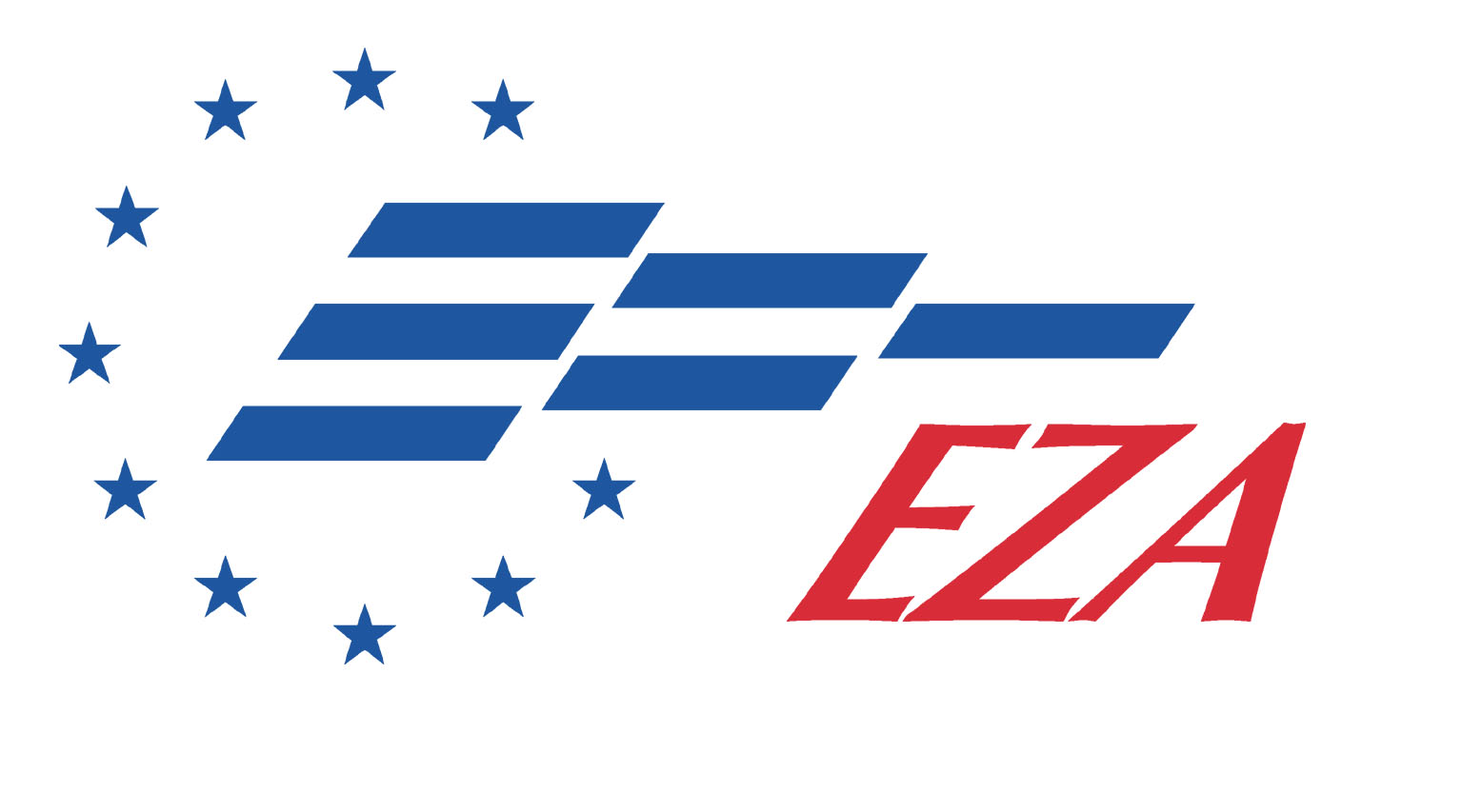
- Formation: January 29, 1985
- Type: Nonprofit organization
- Purpose: Workers' questions, european social dialogue
- Headquarters: Königswinter
- Region served: Austria, Belgium, Bulgaria, Croatia, Cyprus, Czech Republic, Danemark, Estonia, France, Germany, Greece, Italy, Hungary, Latvia, Lithuania, Luxembourg, Malta, Netherlands, North Macedonia, Poland, Portugal, Romania, Switzerland, Serbia, Slovakia, Slovenia, Spain, Ukraine, United Kingdom
- Website: www.eza.org

The European Centre for Workers' Questions (EZA) is a European network of 70 labor unions from 29 countries. The administration is located in Königswinter. Members of EZA are worker's organizations and educational and research institutes that deal with worker's questions with reference to Christian social values. These organizations have around 8 million members. Moreover, the EZA has further partners in Europe and cultivates relations to worker's organizations in other regions.

The work of the EZA is being funded by the European Union.

== Goals ==
The EZA attempts to achieve two goals with its work:

- Support of social dialogue to be used as an instrument to advance social partnerships and political consultation of the European Union. In using this dialogue they connect themselves to social challenges within the European plane.
- Promotion of the social and economic development of the society as well as integrating Europe in employment fields.

With this background, the EZA wants to contribute to finding answers for employment and social questions, where they place special attention on those who are socially disadvantaged. In particular, they see education as a means to build a better and more cohesive European society in order to counter social inequalities.

== Activity ==
The EZA conducts seminars about relevant, current questions of the European social dialogue with its members and partners to present possible solutions. The themes consist of structural challenges of the personnel selection, equal opportunity for women and men, the compatibility of family and work, as well as the migration of employees.

The EZA also addresses multipliers and those responsible of labor unions. Moreover, the EZA conducts courses for executives and employees of labor unions for the consolidation and expansion of competencies and knowledge within the European context.

Additionally, it advises its members and partners in the development of projects for the execution of European educational measures and promotes topic orientated networks and platforms to its members and other organisations.

Countries with EZA Members

== History ==
The EZA was founded on January 29, 1985 in Brussels. The goal was to create a Europe-wide workers education with an emphasis on Christian social values. At first, there were members from ten organizations from Belgium, France, Germany, Italy, Ireland, Luxembourg, Austria, and Switzerland.

== Committees ==
The EZA committees include the general assembly, the administrative board and the presidium.

The general assembly consists of complete members, candidate members, associate members and members of the administrative board. Candidate members, associate members, and observers take part in advising, whereas the general assembly has power to vote on the administrative board.

The administrative board consists of the president, co-president, at least five vice presidents, a treasurer, at least seven assessors, a general secretary and three auditors. They are voted for four years and are in charge of voting for the general secretaries, the acceptance of the yearly tasks and financial reports from the presidum and the secretaries, and the acceptance of the members.

The presidium consists of the president, the co-president, the five vice presidents, the treasurer, as well as the general secretary. They are voted in for five years and work together with the secretariat of businesses.

== Presidents ==
- 1985–1988: Wolfgang Vogt, MdB, Parliamentary State Secretary at the Federal Minister of Labor and Social Affairs, Germany
- 1988–1995: Miet Smet, Secretary of State for the Environment, Social Emancipation, Employment, and Work and since March 1992 the Minister for Employment and Work in Belgium
- 1995–1998: Arie Hordijk, former General Secretary of the Christelijk Nationaal Vakverbond in the Netherlands (CNV)
- 1998–2006: Leo Pauwels, formerly in the ACW (Koepel van Chritelijke Werknemersorganisaties) in Belgium
- 2006–2011: Raf Chanterie, former member of European Parliament in Belgium
- 2011-2018: Bartho Pronk, former member of European Parliament in the Netherlands
- Since 2018: Luc Van den Brande, former Minister-president of Flanders and the European Union's Committee of the Regions.

=== Co-Presidents ===
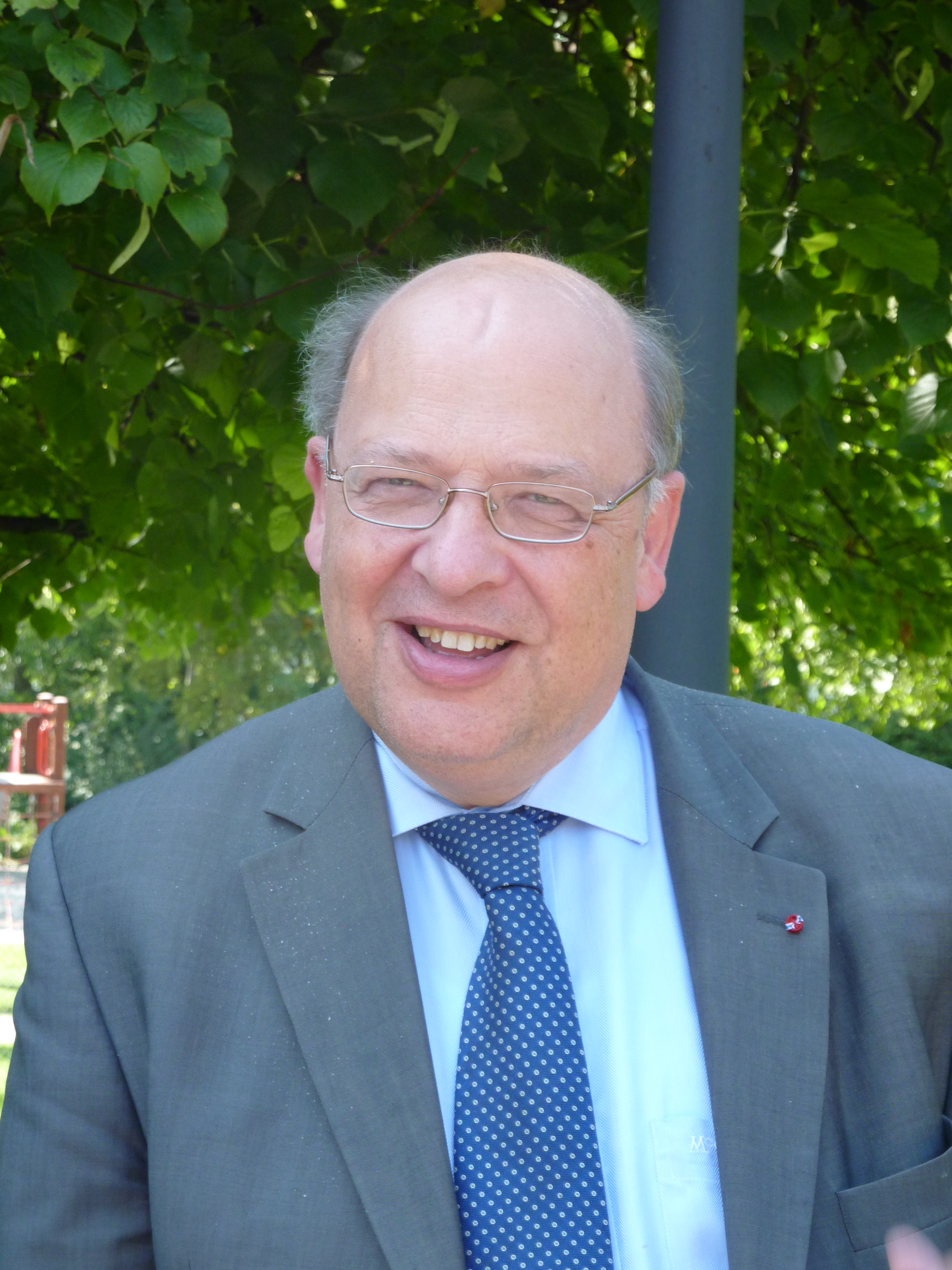
Bartho Pronk, President of the European Centre for Workers' Questions

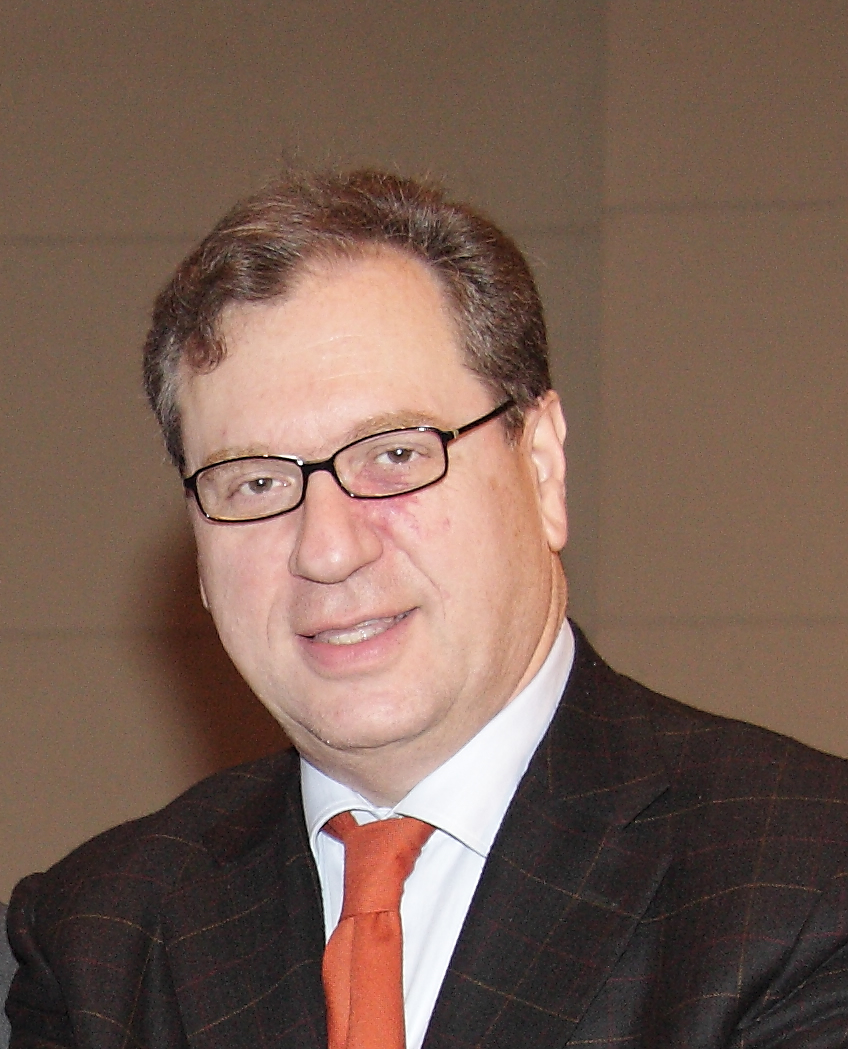
Piergiorgio Sciacqua, Co-President of the European Centre for Workers' Questions

since 2010: Piergiorgio Sciacqua, Member of MCL (Movimento Cristiano Lavoratori) / EFAL (Ente Nazionale per la Formazione e l’Addestramento dei Lavoratori), Italy

=== Former Presidents ===
since 2006: 1998-2006: Leo Pauwels, formerly in the ACW (Koepel van Chritelijke Werknemersorganisaties) in Belgium

== Publications ==
Aside from side projects and annual reports, the EZA publishes their series, Contributions to Social Dialogue and educational programs such as the European Social Dialogue. They also publish a quarterly journal called the "EZA-Magazine" that reports the work of the EZA.

== Websites ==
- European Centre for Workers' Questions
- EurActiv.de
- Johannes-Albers-Bildungsforum gGmbH
- KAB Switzerland
