= Helen Markley Miller =

American novelist (1896–1984)

Helen Catherine Knapp Markley Miller (December 4, 1896 – November 1984) was an American writer of historical and biographical fiction for children taking place in the Western United States.

== Biography ==
Miller was born on December 4, 1896, in Cedar Falls, Iowa. In 1919, she graduated from the Iowa Teachers College in her city of birth. Subsequently, she worked as an English teacher until her marriage. She married journalist Martin Baxter Miller (May 30, 1900 – May 14, 1944), who became managing editor at the Idaho Statesman. After her husband died of a heart attack, she picked up teaching again.

In 1953, Doubleday published Miller's first book, Promenade All. In 1954 she graduated with a master's degree from Western State College of Colorado. Her masters' thesis, Let me be a free man, was about Chief Joseph. Like many of her books, it was a fictionalized biography.

After her graduate studies, Miller lived in McCall, Idaho and wrote 21 more books. All were published by major publishing houses. She was represented by literary agent Barthold Fles. She taught at the University of Idaho.

Miller's only son, Mack Miller, participated as a cross-country skier in the Winter Olympics of 1956 and 1960. Mack and his sport formed the inspiration to Mrs. Miller's sixth novel, Ski fast, ski long.

In 1966, Promenade all was published in German as Indianerblut (Indian blood).

== Bibliography ==
- 1953 - Promenade all (Doubleday)
- 1957 - Dust in the gold sack (Doubleday)
- 1957 - Benjamin Bonneville, soldier explorer, 1796-1878 (Messner)
- 1959 - Miss Gail (Doubleday)
- 1959 - Thunder Rolling; the Story of Chief Joseph (Putnam)
- 1960 - Ski fast, ski long (Doubleday)
- 1960 - Woman doctor of the West, Bethenia Owens-Adair (Messner)
- 1961 - The long valley (Doubleday)
- 1961 - Westering women (Doubleday)
- 1962 - The lucky laces (Doubleday)
- 1962 - Sagebrush ranch (Doubleday)
- 1962 - Striving to be champion, Babe Didrikson Zaharias (Kingston House)
- 1963 - Blades of Grass (Doubleday)
- 1964 - Kirsti (Doubleday)
- 1965 - Ski the mountain (Doubleday)
- 1966 - Julie (Doubleday)
- 1966 - Lens on the West; the story of William Henry Jackson (Doubleday)
- 1967 - Janey and friends (Doubleday)
- 1968 - Beloved Monster (Doubleday)
- 1968 - George Rogers Clark, frontier fighter (Putnam)
- 1970 - The San Francisco earthquake and fire (Putnam)
- 1971 - Jedediah Smith on the far frontier (Putnam)

== Honors and awards ==
- 1966 - Nominee for the Dorothy Canfield Fisher Children's Book Award with Kirsti (Ribsy by Beverly Cleary won)
