= Elizabeth Linington =

American novelist (1921–1988)

- Born: March 11, 1921; Aurora, Illinois, U.S.
- Died: April 5, 1988 (aged 67); Arroyo Grande, California, U.S.
- Writing career
- Pen name: Anne Blaisdell, Lesley Egan, Egan O'Neill, Dell Shannon

Barbara "Elizabeth" Linington (March 11, 1921 – April 5, 1988) was an American novelist and mystery writer. She was one of the first women to write in the style of a police procedural.

== Biography ==
She was born on March 11, 1921, in Aurora, Kane County, Illinois; and died on April 5, 1988, in Arroyo Grande, San Luis Obispo County, California. During much of her career she was represented by literary agent Barthold Fles.

Besides crime, Linington also took interest in archaeology, the occult, gemstones, antique weapons and languages. Linington was a conservative political activist who was an active member of the John Birch Society.

== Pseudonyms ==
Linington wrote under several monikers, including 'Anne Blaisdell', 'Lesley Egan', 'Egan O'Neill' and 'Dell Shannon'.

== Bibliography ==
Books she authored include:

=== Elizabeth Linington ===
- The Proud Man (1955)
- The Long Watch (1956)
- Greenmask! (1964)
- No Evil Angel (1964)
- Date with Death (1966)
- Something Wrong (1967)
- Policeman's Lot (1968)
- Practice to Deceive (1971)
- Crime by Chance (1973)
- Perchance of Death (1977)
- No Villain Need Be (1979)
- Consequence of Crime (1980)
- Skeletons in the Closet (1982)
- Felony Report (1984)
- Strange Felony (1986)
- Alter Ego (1988)

=== Anne Blaisdell ===
- Nightmare (1961). Filmed by Hammer Films as Fanatic (US title: Die! Die! My Darling!). Screenplay by Richard Matheson

=== Lesley Egan ===
- A Case for appeal (1961)
- The Borrowed Alibi (1962)
- Against the Evidence (1962)
- Run to Evil (1963)
- My Name Is Death (1964)
- Detective's Due (1965)
- Some Avenger, Rise! (1966)
- The Nameless Ones (1967)
- A Serious Investigation (1968)
- The Wine of Violence (1969)
- In the Death of a Man (1970)
- Malicious Mischief (1971)
- Paper Chase (1972)
- Scenes of Crime (1976)
- The Blind Search (1977)
- A Dream Apart (1978)
- Look Back on Death (1978)
- The Hunters and the Hunted (1979)
- Motive in Shadow (1980)
- A Choice of Crimes (1980)
- The Miser (1981)
- Random Death (1982)
- Little Boy Lost (1983)
- Crime for Christmas (1983)
- Chain of Violence (1985)
- The Wine of Life (1985)

=== Egan O'Neill ===
- The Anglophile (1957)

=== Dell Shannon ===
- Case Pending (1960)
- The Ace of Spades (1961)
- Extra Kill (1962)
- Knave of Hearts (1962)
- Death of a Busybody (1963)
- Double Bluff (1963)
- Mark of Murder (1964)
- Root of All Evil (1964)
- The Death-Bringers (1965)
- Death by Inches (1965)
- Coffin Corner (1966)
- With a Vengeance (1966)
- Chance to Kill (1967)
- Rain with Violence (1967)
- Kill with Kindness (1968)
- Schooled to Kill (1969)
- Crime on their Hands (1969)
- Unexpected Death (1970)
- Whim to Kill (1971)
- The Ringer (1971)
- Murder with Love (1972)
- With Intent to Kill (1972)
- No Holiday for Crime (1973)
- Spring of Violence (1973)
- Crime File (1974)
- Deuces Wild (1975)
- Streets of Death (1976)
- Appearances of Death (1977)
- Cold Trail (1978)
- Felony at Random (1979)
- Felony File (1980)
- Murder Most Strange (1981)
- The Motive on Record (1982)
- Exploit of Death (1983)
- Destiny of Death (1984)
- Chaos of Crime (1985)
- Blood Count (1986)
- Murder by the Tale (short stories) (1987)
- The Dispossessed (1988)
- The Manson Curse (1990)
- Sorrow in the Grave (1992)

== Awards ==
She was awarded runner-up scrolls for best first mystery novel from the Mystery Writers of America for her 1960 novel, Case Pending, which introduced her most popular series character, LAPD Homicide Lieutenant Luis Mendoza. Her 1961 book, Nightmare, and her 1962 novel, Knave of Hearts, another entry in the Mendoza series, were both nominated for the Edgar Award in the Best Novel category. Regarded as the "Queen of the Procedurals," she was one of the first women to write police procedurals — a male-dominated genre of police-story writing.
