= Dola de Jong =

American novelist

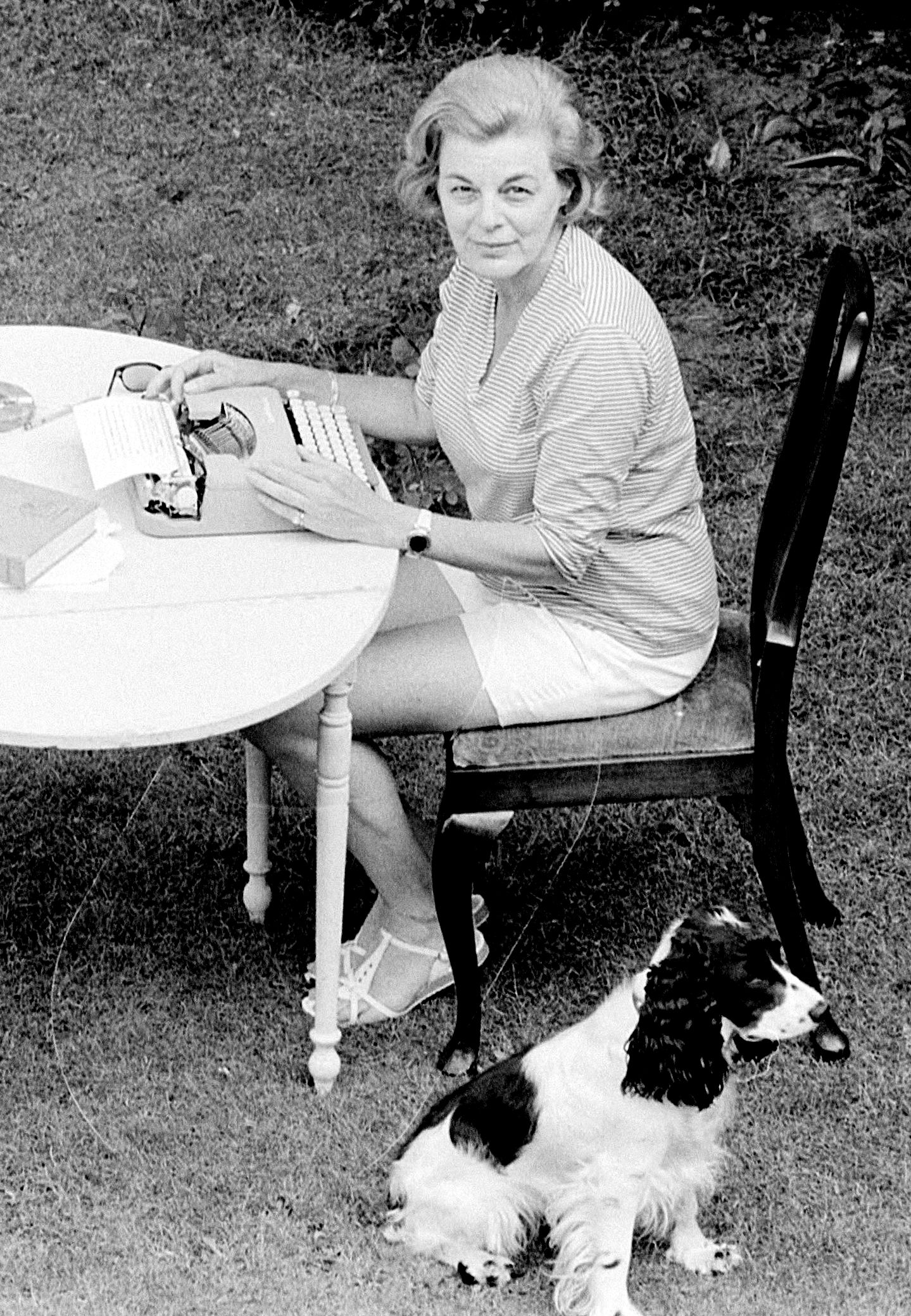
- Dola de Jong, 1963
- Born: Dorothea Rosalie de Jong; October 10, 1911 Arnhem
- Died: November 12, 2003 (aged 92) Laguna Woods, California, US
- Occupation: Literary agent; author; dancer
- Language: Dutch and English
- Notable works: The Tree and the Vine (1954)

Dola de Jong (10 October 1911 - 12 November 2003) was a Jewish Dutch-American writer. She is most well-known for her publication of The Tree and the Vine in 1954, which depicts a lesbian relationship.

== Personal life and education ==
Dola de Jong was born Dorothea Rosalie de Jong in 1911 in Arnhem, The Netherlands, to a wealthy Jewish father, Salomon Louis de Jong, and a German mother, Lotte Rosalie Benjamin.

De Jong had two brothers. She owes her name to her older brother Hans, who changed Dorothea (or Dora) into Dola. Her mother, German by birth, was in poor health, so Dola often stayed with an ‘aunt Mathilde’ in Haarlem. Her mother died when Dola was five years old.

As a young woman, she aspired to become a ballet dancer, but her conservative father viewed ballet as “one step away from prostitution,” as she told Het Parool in a 1982 interview. Her father wanted to send her to a finishing school in Lausanne, “but I was a rebel,” she said, “I always have been.”

Instead, she took a job at a local newspaper, Nieuwe Arnhemsche Courant. When the newspaper went bankrupt, de Jong moved to Amsterdam in the early 1930s where she started taking dance lessons. She became a member of the Royal Dutch Ballet for eight years and toured the Netherlands with the Yvonne Georgi. To fund her dance lessons, de Jong started working as a freelance journalist, writing under the pseudonym Sourit Ballon. During this time, she also published some children's books.

While many around her were in denial of the growing threat to the east, de Jong was quick to realize that the Netherlands was no longer safe for Jewish people. She fled the country for Tangier, Morocco in April 1940, weeks before the Nazis invaded Holland. Her father, stepmother, and one brother, whom she could not convince to leave with her, were killed by the Nazis.

In Tangier, de Jong married the painter Jan Hoowij in 1941. In the same year, the two moved to New York City. de Jong became an American citizen in 1947. She later divorced Hoowij and married her second husband, Robert Joseph. Together they had one son, Ian, in 1951.

In 1970, she separated from Robert Joseph and started a relationship with Oscar Van Leer. The couple moved to The Netherlands, where she lived until their breakup. In 1978, she returned to New York, where she began started studying psychology and literature at the Empire State College of the State University of New York. After graduating in 1983, at 72, Dola worked as a teacher at the same institution until she was 78.

In the late 1980s, she started painting, and wrote for De Nieuwe Amsterdammer.

== Career ==
Dola de Jong published her first adult novel in 1939. In 1945, she published a novel about war refugees, The Field is the World, which was inspired by her stay in Tangier. Two years later, the novel was published in Dutch as En de akker is de wereld, and was awarded the City of Amsterdam's Literature Prize in 1947. Dola was nominated for the Edgar Allan Poe Award for the thriller The House on Charlton Street (1962), and later won the Edgar Allan Poe Award for the mystery novel The Whirligig of Time (1964), which she later translated into Dutch.

Along with her writing, de Jong worked as a literary agent for publishing houses, resulting in the U.S. publications of Anne Frank, Hugo Claus, Jan Cremer, etc.

The Tree and the Vine is one of de Jong's most prominent works. It was originally published in Dutch in 1954, and translated to English in 1961. It is set in the Netherlands in the 1930s, and describes a love between two women. It is candid in its depiction of queer desire. The relationship is complicated, and explores many aspects of love and life in the Netherlands during the Nazi occupation. The lesbian subject matter is surprising, considering the time in which the book was published. It fits into the tradition of American lesbian pulp fiction books, and like many of those books, the story does not end happily for the lesbian relationship. Instead, it normalizes the characters’ unhappinesses, showing them to be just as complicated as anyone else’s, despite sexuality. Because of its setting, it's possible de Jong drew on her own life to write this novel. Before its publication in the Netherlands, it was rejected as “unpublishable” and “shameless.” To publish in America, it took the intervention of distinguished friends abroad, including de Jong’s American editor, Maxwell Perkins, to get the novel into print. When it first appeared in English in 1961, reviewers likewise misread this subtle character study, bizarrely, as trash about “compulsive sin” and “the world of the sexual pervert,” Lillian Faderman noted in a later reissue.

The Tree and the Vine was reissued by the Feminist Press in 1996.

== Death ==
Dola de Jong started to have heart problems in the 1980s, and was diagnosed with cancer of the bone marrow in 1995. She left New York in 1995 to live in a nursing home in Laguna Woods, California, not far from her son Ian.

Dola died in California on November 12, 2003, at 92.

== Notable works ==
- 1936 or 1938 – Tussen huis en horizon
  - English: Between Home and Horizon (1962)
- 1939 – Van Klaas Vaak en zijn brave zandkaboutertjes
  - English: Sand for the Sandmen (1946)
- 1940 – En de akker is de wereld
  - English: And the Field is the World (1945)
- 1940 or 1942 – Knikkernik, Knakkernak en Knokkernok
  - English: Nikkernik, Nakkernak and Nokkernok (1942)
- 1943 – The Level Land
- 1946 – The Picture Story of Holland
- 1947 – Return to the Level Land
- 1954 – De thuiswacht
  - English: The Tree and the Vine (1961, tr. Ilona Kinzer; 2020, tr. Kristen Gehrman)
- 1960 – By Marvelous Agreement
- 1962 – The House on Charlton Street
- 1963 – One Summer’s Secret
- 1964 – The Whirligig of Time
