= Jan Nico Scholten =

Dutch politician (1932–2026)

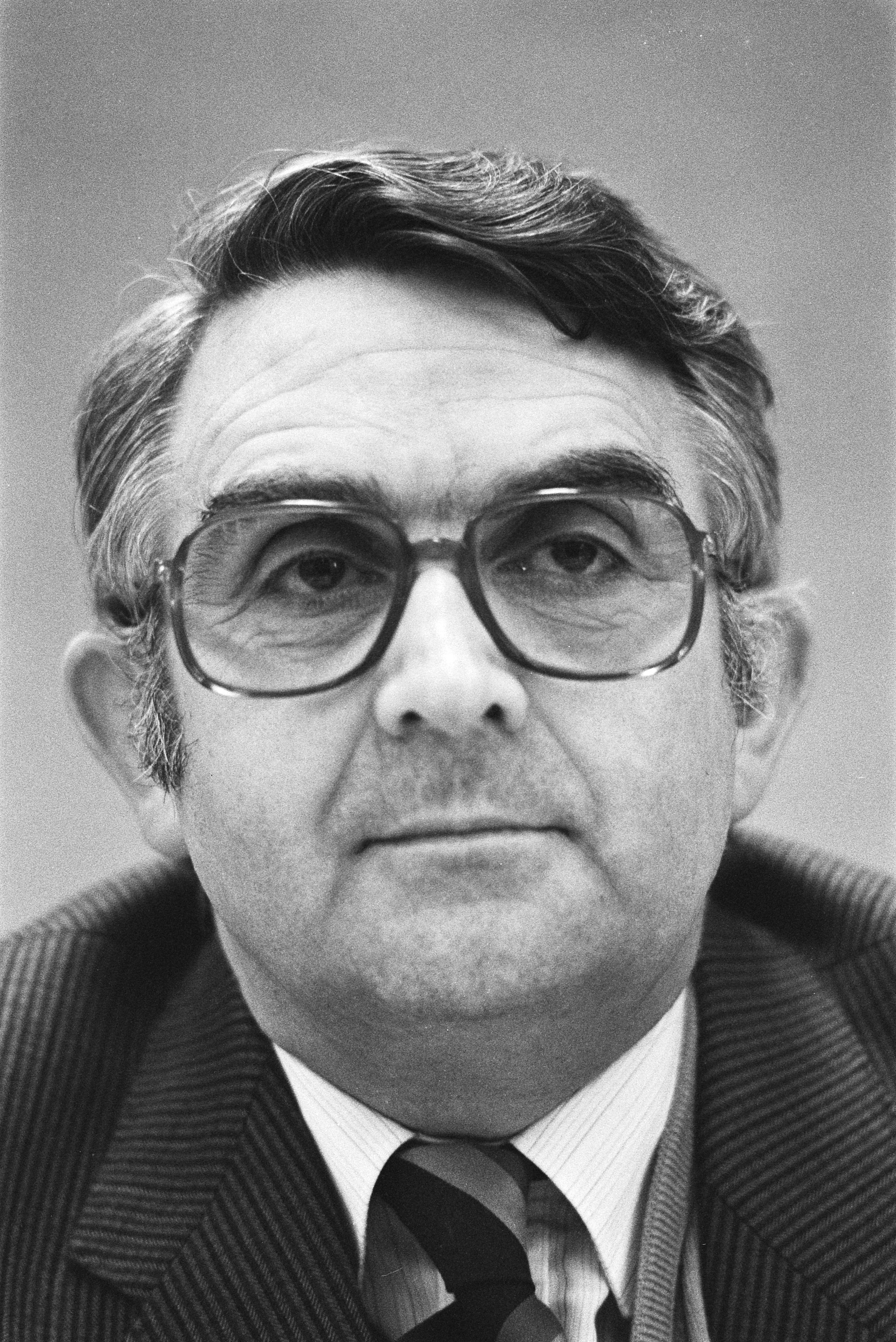
- Scholten in 1984

Member of the Senate
- In office 31 March 1998 – 8 June 1999
- Parliamentary group: Labour Party

Member of the House of Representatives
- In office 11 November 1982 – 3 June 1986
- Parliamentary group: Independent (1983–1986); Christian Democratic Appeal (1982–1983)
- In office 15 September 1981 – 16 September 1982
- Parliamentary group: Christian Democratic Appeal
- In office 1 March 1973 – 10 June 1981
- Parliamentary group: Christian Democratic Appeal (1980–1981); Anti-Revolutionary Party (1973–1980)
- In office 3 August 1971 – 7 December 1972
- Parliamentary group: Anti-Revolutionary Party
- In office 15 September 1970 – 10 May 1971
- Parliamentary group: Anti-Revolutionary Party

Mayor of Andel, Giessen and Rijswijk
- In office 16 May 1964 – 1 January 1973
- Preceded by: Gerrit Adriaan Bax
- Succeeded by: Lou Voster (as Mayor of Woudrichem)

Personal details
- Born: Jan Nico Scholten; 4 June 1932 Dalen, Netherlands
- Died: 21 January 2026 (aged 93) Amsterdam, Netherlands
- Party: Labour Party (from 1986)
- Other political affiliations: Independent (1983–1986); Christian Democratic Appeal (1980–1983); Anti-Revolutionary Party (until 1980)
- Education: Vrije Universiteit Amsterdam (Bachelor of Laws, Master of Laws)
- Occupation: Politician; Civil servant; Jurist; Nonprofit director; Activist

Jan Nico Scholten (4 June 1932 – 21 January 2026) was a Dutch politician.

== Early life and education ==
Scholten was born in Dalen. He studied law and political science at VU University Amsterdam. After being mayor of the municipalities Andel, Giessen and Rijswijk for nine years and Chairman of a District Council for ten years, he joined the Dutch Parliament from 1970–1986 (House) and later in 1998–1999 (Senate). He served as a member of the Benelux-Parliament and of the Assembly of the Council of Europe.

== AWEPAA ==
In 1984, Jan Nico Scholten took the initiative for the foundation of AWEPAA, the Association of West European Parliamentarians for Action against Apartheid. He sought to coordinate at the international level the struggle against the apartheid regime in South Africa. As President of AWEPAA he travelled through Europe and to the United States and Canada to stimulate support for sanctions. In 1985, he was arrested in Washington D.C. at a demonstration in front of the South African embassy. There he spent the night in prison reading a prayer book by Archbishop Desmond Tutu before being released the following day.

As President of AWEPAA he also worked for the independence of Namibia and for the support to the Frontline States of Southern Africa. In 1986 he left parliament—although at the end of the nineties he became a member of the Dutch Senate for two years- which allowed him more time for his work at AWEPAA. At the invitation of the Council of Churches in Namibia he participated in the Eminent Persons Observer Mission in Namibia, which monitored the independence elections. On 21 March 1990, he was a guest of the new government when the Namibia flag was first raised in Windhoek. On this occasion he declared: “Today Windhoek, tomorrow Pretoria”. On numerous occasions, AWEPAA organised conferences on Namibia to bring the need for European support for independent Namibia to the attention of European politicians.

In order to promote the dialogue between Africa and Europe, the African-European Institute was established in 1988 on the initiative of Jan Nico Scholten. Africans and Europeans work together in the Institute for increased understanding and cooperation, among them Archbishop Desmond Tutu, Ms. Graça Machel and late Dr. Mosé Tjitendero, Speaker of Namibia.

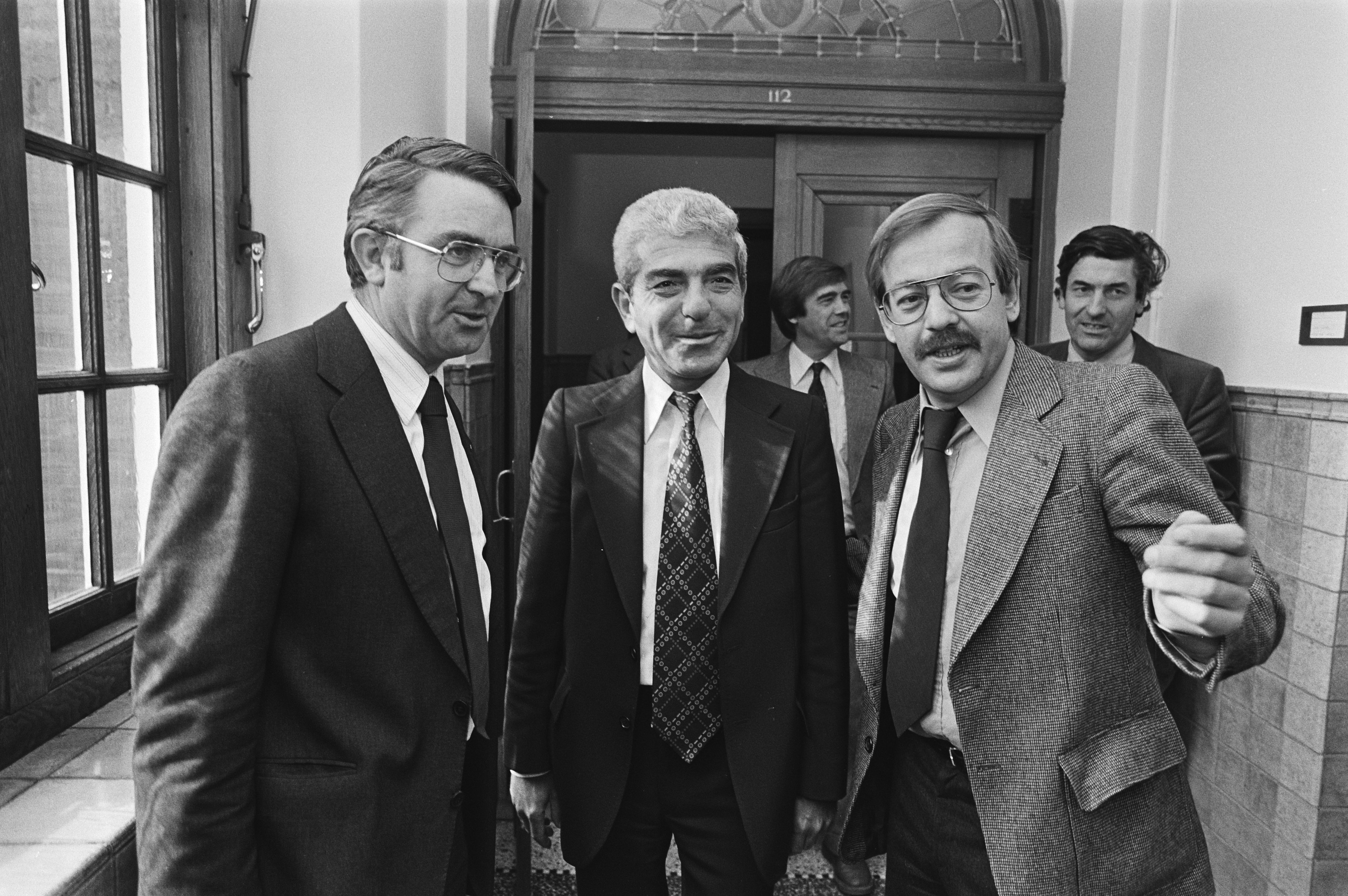
Scholten, Palestinian diplomat Issam Sartawi and Relus ter Beek pictured in the Hague (1979)

Besides being President of AWEPAA, Jan Nico Scholten was from 1983-1998 the chairman of the Dutch Refugee Council, the coordinating organisation for support of refugees in the Netherlands. Assistance to refugees was always a great concern for him. In the 1970s he visited Palestinian refugee camps and was deeply moved by the misery of above all women and children. He worked for a resolution of the Middle East conflict in which both the rights of the Palestinians and the continued existence of Israel would be honoured.

In the Netherlands he was involved in many social issues, like housing for low income and elderly people and services to the handicapped. Furthermore, he was Chairman of the Federation of Employees in the non-profit sector for ten years.

== AWEPA ==
Following the abolition of apartheid in the early 1990s, Jan Nico Scholten transformed AWEPAA into a new organization, The Association of European Parliamentarians for Africa (AWEPA). In his work for AWEPA he remained dedicated to supporting parliamentary democracy in Africa while also striving to keep Africa high on the agenda of European parliamentarians.

Dedicated to humanitarian solidarity, Dr. Jan Nico Scholten was Mayor and Chairman of a District Council before joining the Dutch Parliament (house and senate) as well as serving as a member of the Benelux-Parliament and the Assembly of the Council of Europe. In 1984 he took the initiative in the founding of what is now called AWEPA. He served as Executive and non-Executive President for AWEPA's first 25 years. He received awards from the United Nations, various African countries and the Queen of the Netherlands honouring his commitment to human dignity. After completing his term as President in 2009, Dr. Scholten was on the eminent advisory board of AWEPA and continued to be a valued asset to the organisation.

== Death ==
Scholten died in Amsterdam on 21 January 2026, at the age of 93.

== Awards received ==
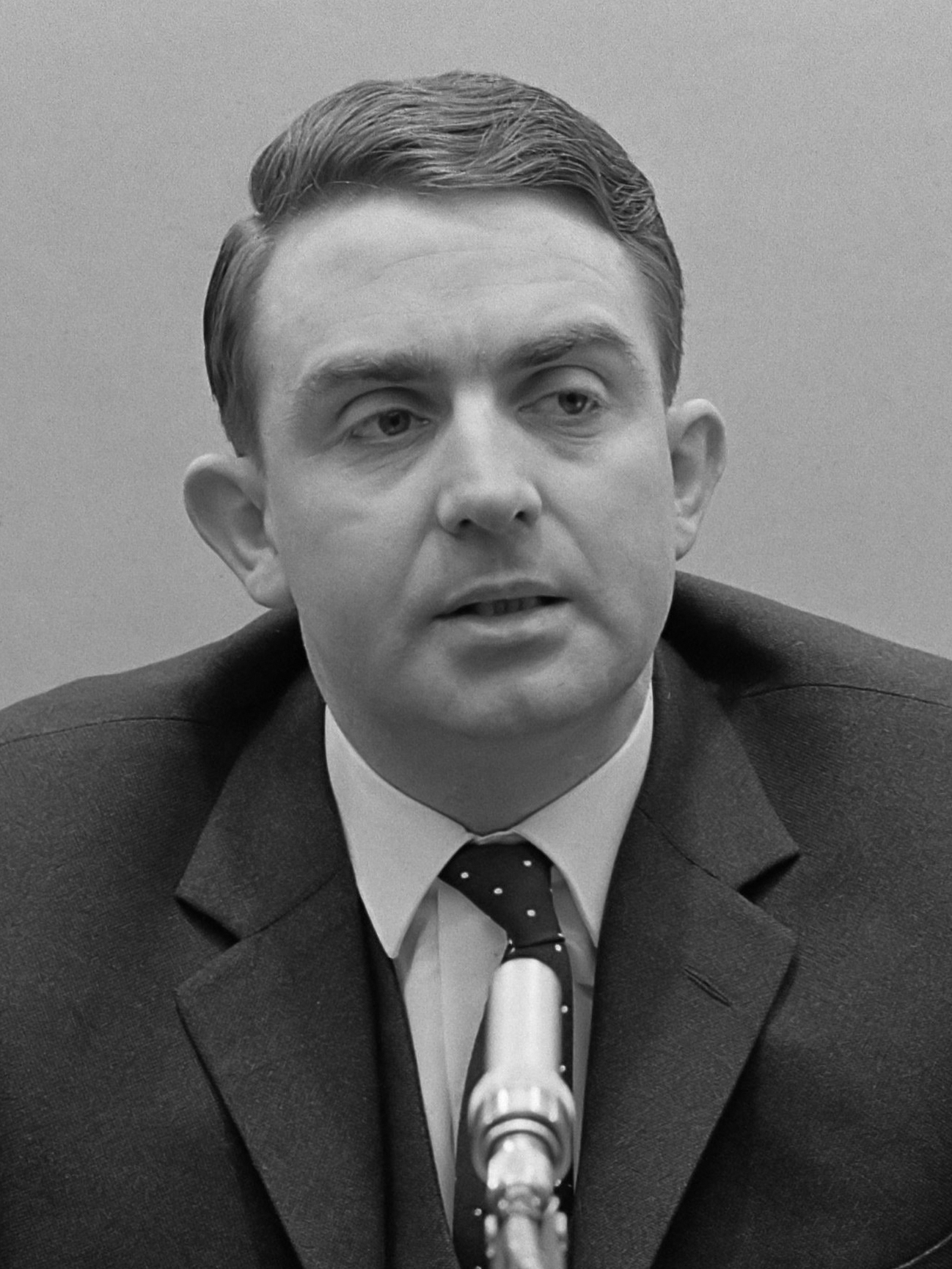
Jan Nico Scholten (1963)

- Decorated in 1973 by PAIGC, the Liberation Movement of Guinea Bissau and the Cape Verde Islands, for continuous support to this organisation as a Member of the Dutch Parliament
- Honoured in 1982 with the Gold Medal of the United Nations General Assembly on the recommendation of the OAU and the UN Special Committee Against Apartheid "for outstanding contribution to the international movement for sanctions against South Africa in solidarity with the national liberation movement of South Africa"
- Decorated in 1982 by Her Majesty the Queen of the Netherlands with a Knighthood in the Order of the Netherlands Lion
- 1997 -Doctor Honoris Causa, Law Faculty of Western Cape University (South Africa)
- Decorated in 1999 by Her Majesty the Queen of the Netherlands with a Knighthood in the Order of "Oranje-Nassau".
- Decorated in 2002 by the President of Gabon for Contribution to Peace Building in Africa with l’Ordre d’Etoile Equatoriale
- Decorated in 2006 by President Mbeki “in recognition of his exceptional contribution during the struggle of the people of South Africa against Apartheid”
