= Maurits Dekker =

Dutch novelist and playwright (1896–1962)

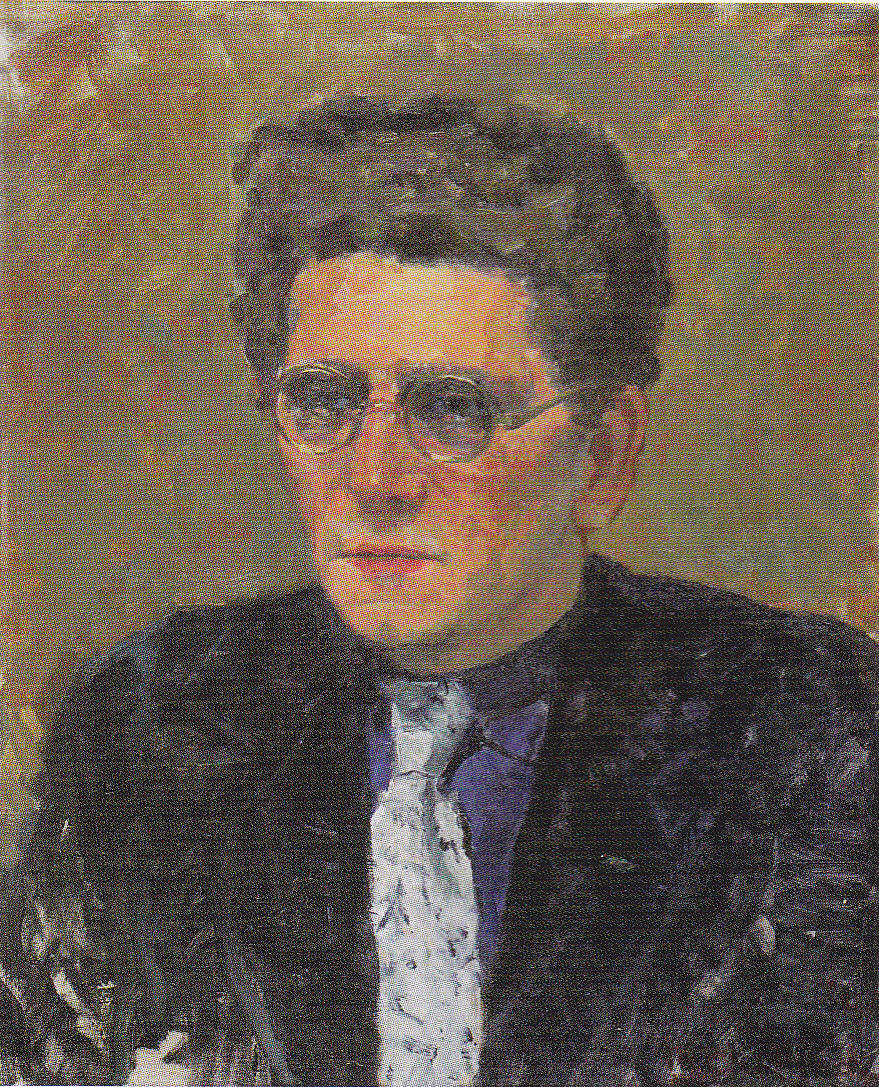
Maurits Dekker (1941) (Portrait by Meijer Bleekrode)

Maurits Rudolph Joël Dekker (16 July 1896, in Amsterdam – 7 October 1962) was a Dutch novelist and playwright.

He was the son of Joël Dekker, a Jewish merchant and house painter, and Betje Turksma, a nurse.

== Honors and awards ==
- 1949 Prize of the Society Kunstenaarsverzet
- 1955 Marianne Philips Prize
- 1956 Special Award from the Jan Campert Society for his works
- 1956 Literary Prize of City of Amsterdam for Op zwart stramien
