= Mary Dolim =

American novelist

Mary Nuzum Dolim (August 15, 1925 – January 15, 2002) was an American children's writer. She published four books and penned several articles and short stories. Mary Dolim was noted for writing about the Southern United States and for writing about career women in the 1960s.

Mary Dolim was married to Abel Dolim (1922–2012), an airplane navigator who later became a builder, with whom she had a son and a daughter. They lived in the San Francisco East Bay Area.

== Books ==
- Bishop Pattern (New York: Morrow), 1963
  - Also published as The Ruling Family (New York: Avon Books), 1963
- Miss Mac (Princeton, NJ: Van Nostrand), 1963
- The Omen (New York: Morrow), 196?
- Four Hands for Mercy (New York: Grosset & Dunlap), 1965, with Gen Kakacek
