= Hans Natonek =

Hans Natonek (28 October 1892 – 23 October 1963), pen name N. O. Kent, was a Jewish-Czech-German-American author and journalist.

He was born in Königliche Weinberge, Prague and died in Tucson, Arizona.

== Literature ==
- Paul Pinchas Maurer, Hans Natonek. Ein Leben in Exil, Jerusalem, 2023, ISBN 978-965-92856-17
