= Thijs Berman =

Dutch politician and journalist

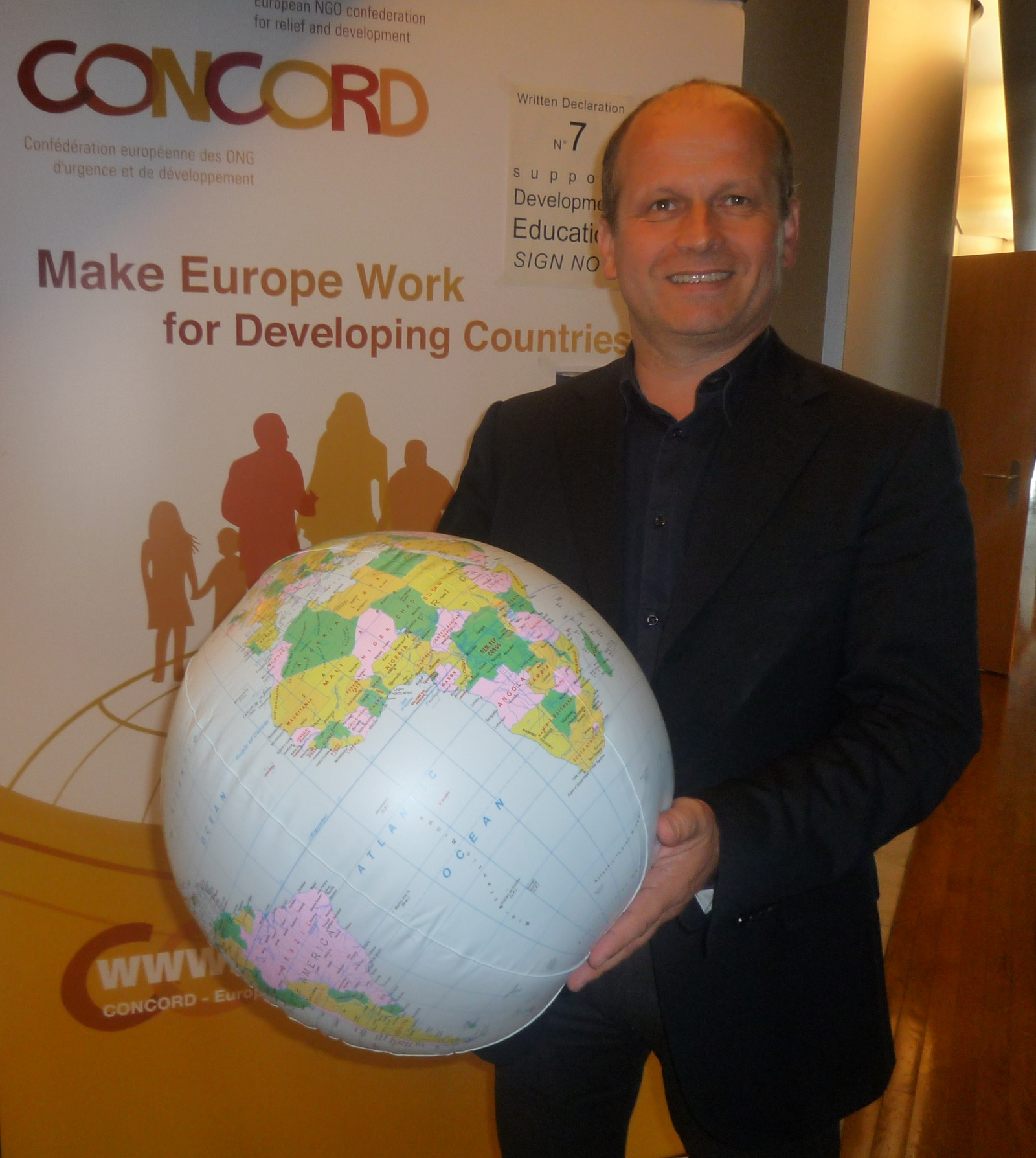
- Berman in 2012
- Born: 26 September 1957 (age 68); Coevorden, Netherlands
- Education: Psychology
- Alma mater: University of Amsterdam, Utrecht University
- Occupation: Executive Director, Netherlands Institute for Multiparty Democracy
- Political party: Partij van de Arbeid (Netherlands)

Thijs Berman (born 26 September 1957) is a Dutch former journalist. Between 2004 and 2014, he was a Dutch politician and a Member of the European Parliament.

== Biography ==
Berman was a correspondent in Paris and Moscow for Dutch weekly De Groene Amsterdammer, for the Dutch Public Radio (Radio 1), the Dutch Inter-Churches radio and television IKON, the Dutch international radio Wereldomroep, the agrarian daily Agrarisch Dagblad, and magazine Elsevier. He presented radio and television shows, notably for broadcaster IKON. He was also a regular contributor to TV5, the international French-speaking TV-station.

In June 2004 he was elected to the European Parliament. He is a member of the Dutch Partij van de Arbeid, which is part of the Party of European Socialists, and was, between 2004 and 2008, member of the Committees on Agriculture and on Regional Development. In 2008, he joined the Committees on Budget, and on Development and Humanitarian Affairs. Between 2009 and 2014 he was a member of the European Parliament's Committee on Development and the Subcommittee on Human Rights. He also was a substitute for the Committee on Economic and Monetary Affairs and for the Committee on Budgetary Control. Further he was the chair of the Delegation for relations with Afghanistan.

In 2009 he headed Dutch Labour in the European elections after winning the party primaries.

In 2009, he terminated the EU Election Observation Mission at the presidential elections in Afghanistan, as the successor of French general and politician Philippe Morillon. In 2010, he was appointed as head of the EU Election Observer Mission to Ethiopia. In 2012, he was the EU Chief Observer to the presidential elections in Senegal. In 2014, he was the EU Chief Observer to the presidential elections in Afghanistan.

In 2016, Berman took up a role in Vienna, Austria, as the Principal Adviser to the OSCE Representative on Freedom of the Media.

Berman now resides in the Netherlands, where he works as Executive Director of the Netherlands Institute for Multiparty Democracy (NIMD).

== Controversy ==
Following the Ugandan elections of 2021 Berman's institute NIMD was accused of failing to address the rigging of the elections. On July 1, 2022 the Ugandan community demonstrated in front of NIMD office in The Hague. As a result, the NIMD decided to no longer fund the Inter Party Organization for Dialogue (IPOD) program. Berman is also criticized for having a local representative in Uganda Frank Rusa who is an NRM member and former member of the Ugandan Electoral Commission.

== Bibliography ==
- (in Dutch) Op zoek naar George Fles, het einde van een Hollandse revolutionair in de Sovjetunie ('Searching for George Fles, the end of a Dutch revolutionary in the Soviet Union'). Amsterdam: Van Gennep, 1993. ISBN 90-6012-992-X
