= Gloomy Juncture =

Portuguese neo-noir adventure game

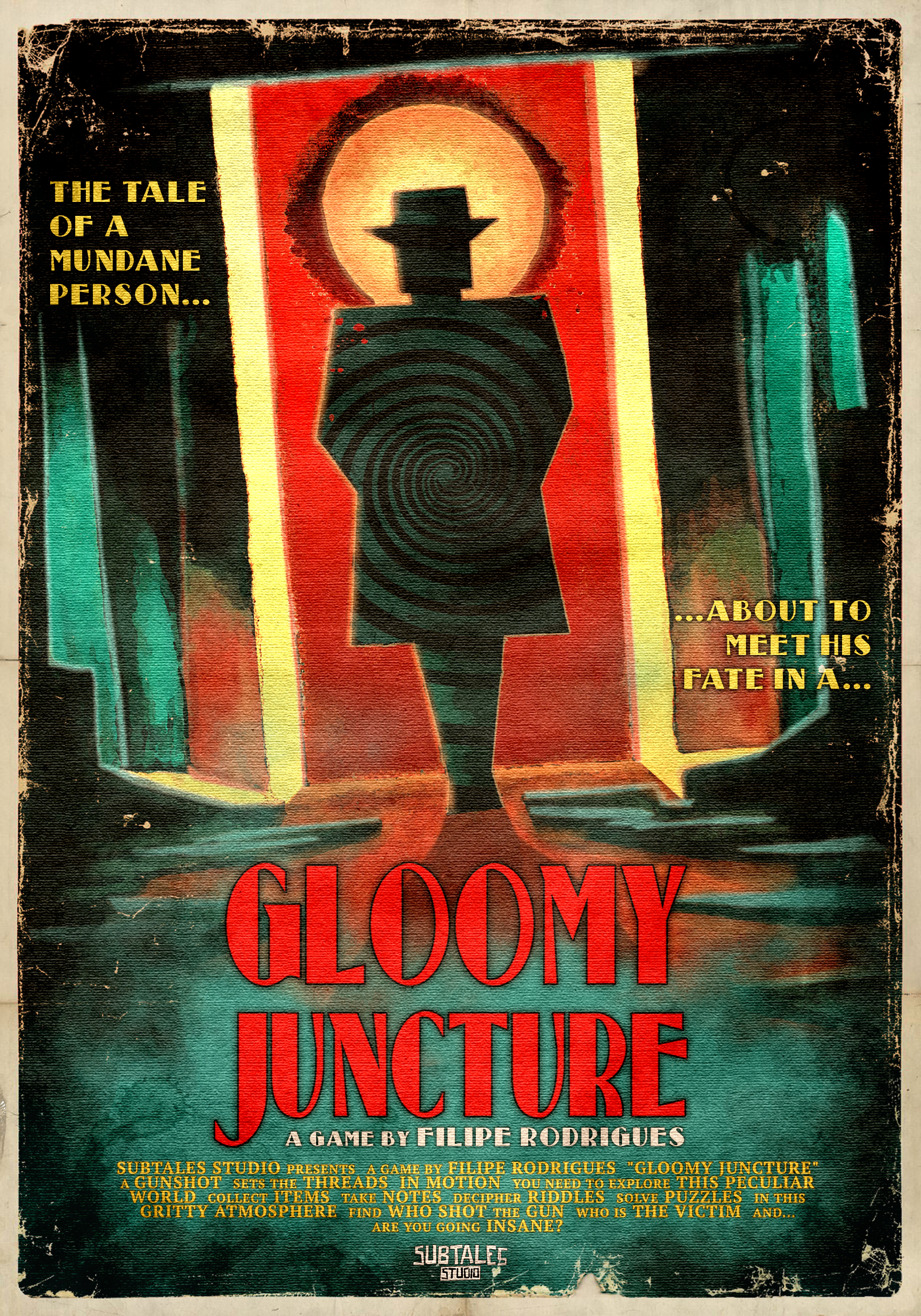
- Developer: Filipe Rodrigues
- Publisher: Filipe Rodrigues
- Designer: Filipe Rodrigues (Note: Rodrigues handled all aspects of development single-handedly, including game design, programming, art, writing, audio, and marketing.)
- Engine: Unity
- Platforms: Windows; macOS
- Genres: Adventure, Psychological thriller
- Mode: Single-player

Gloomy Juncture is an upcoming neo-noir psychological thriller and character-driven adventure game developed by Portuguese indie video game developer Filipe "Subtales" Rodrigues. The game has been praised for its hand-drawn art style, approach to game design, and cinematic storytelling.

Gloomy Juncture's storyline focuses on character interations in a corrupt city. The player controls a mundane janitor whose fate becomes intertwined with a mysterious gunshot, which spirals into a neo-noir mystery with surreal elements.

The visual assets are modelled in a low-poly 3D style, and textures are hand-painted and digitized creating what Rodrigues describes as a juxtaposition of "gritty and pretty."

Rodrigues began the project part-time in early 2021 to improve his game design skills during the COVID-19 pandemic, before committing full-time in 2023. The game is scheduled for release on PC and Mac via Steam.

Prior to release, Gloomy Juncture has attracted attention from the video game industry and press. Edge Magazine hosted an exclusive interview and preview to the game in January 2026, and Vice predicted it could be one of the most talked-about indie games of the year upon release. The game won the Visual Excellence Award at BitSummit Drift 2024, the Bronze Award at the Tencent GWB Game Awards 2024, and both Game of the Year and Reveal of the Year at the Spotlight Awards 2024. Game director SWERY (Deadly Premonition) selected it as one of his top five favourite games from over 100 titles at BitSummit, and the game poster was exhibited in an Art Gallery as part of the Raw Fury "Games Are Art" initiative at Reboot Develop Blue in Dubrovnik, Croatia.

== Gameplay ==
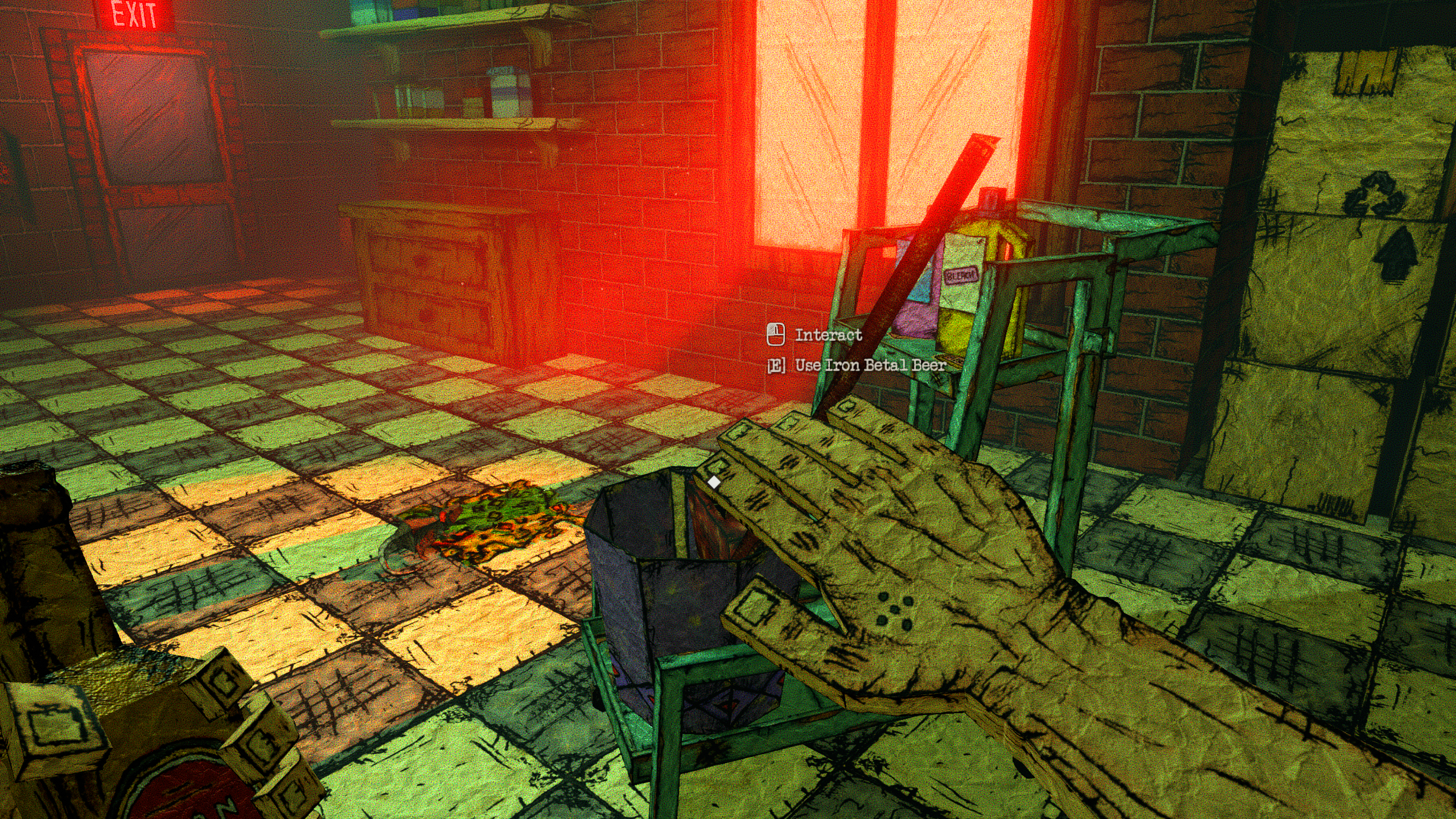
The protagonist interacting with a cleaning trolley while exploring a location in Gloomy Juncture

Gloomy Juncture's gameplay revolves around gathering items, interacting with the environment, and solving increasingly complex puzzles that evolve in scale and complexity as the narrative progresses. The player controls a janitor who becomes embroiled in a neo-noir mystery after a gunshot.

The puzzles range from traditional close-up logic challenges to large-scale environmental ones, dynamic dream sequences, and action-oriented encounters. Exploration is encouraged by interacting with characters, collecting items and notes, and triggering dynamically narrated events that lead to experimentation. There is no repetition in puzzle design, and the more puzzles the player solves the more chaotic and surreal the world becomes, reflecting the janitor's mental state. Hidden objects throughout the game may provide alternate solutions.

The protagonist reacts to player actions with hints and sarcastic observations, providing a noir dynamic narration that offers minimal diegetic tips throughout the adventure.

The game features social commentary while exploring the human condition. The central theme is obsession, expanding on related themes of isolation, unease, and hopelessness.

== Development ==
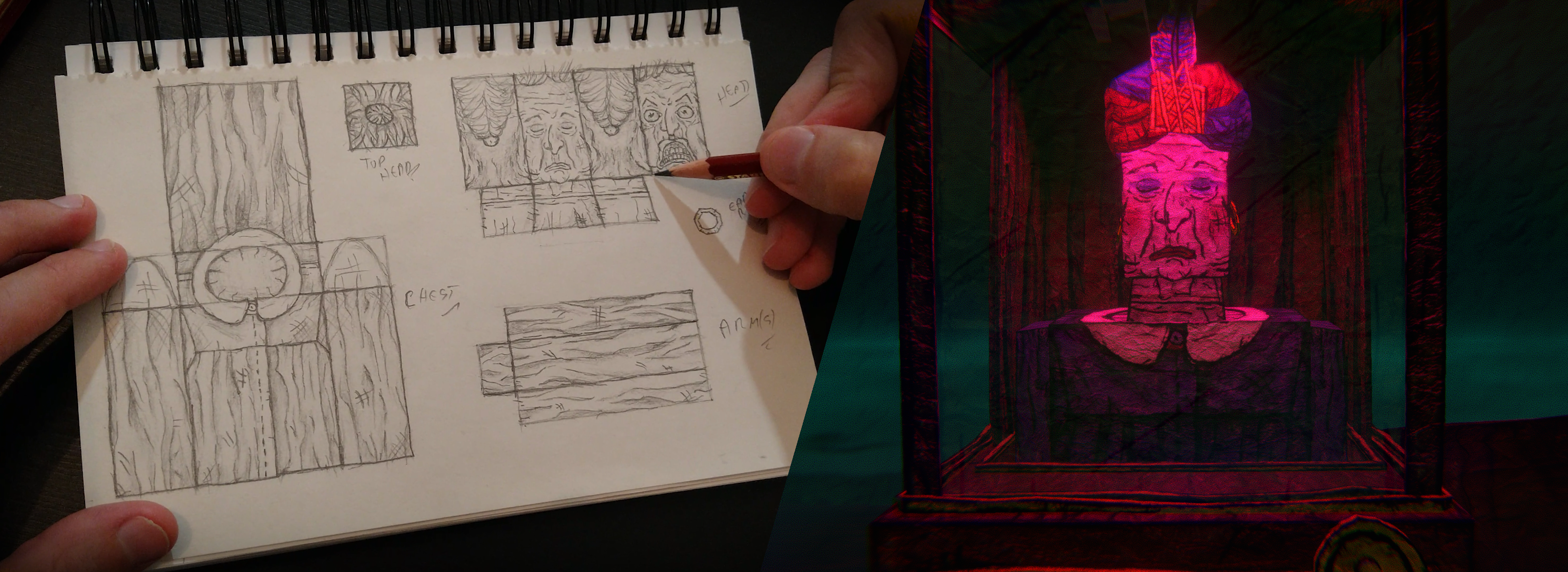
Paper texture drawn by hand (left) and the corresponding in-game 3D character (right)

Rodrigues is the sole developer of the game, including all of the funding, writing, art, 3D models, and audio. The game's visual style results from a handcrafted pipeline in which every object is first drawn by hand on paper, then digitised and modelled in a low-poly three-dimensional style keeping the hi-fidelity hand-drawn textures. This process creates what Rodrigues describes as a "gritty and pretty" style inspired by N64-era graphics. The game uses deferred rendering with custom shaders that highlight the paper feel while adding a squiggly line effect reminiscent of 1990s animation, originally intended to animate the static backgrounds and billboard 2D NPCs from an earlier design approach, and also used to highlight important objects. The engine supports volumetric lighting and fog, dynamic shadows, and multiple dynamic light sources.

Gloomy Juncture draws from a wide range of cinematic influences, including neo-noir films and psychological dramas such as Alfred Hitchcock's Vertigo, Martin Scorsese's Taxi Driver, and Park Chan-wook's Oldboy. For visuals and pacing Rodrigues mentions Dario Argento's Suspiria, David Lynch's Blue Velvet, and Darren Aronofsky's Requiem for a Dream. For gameplay, he has mentioned the desire to recreate the experience of getting lost in a classic graphic adventure looking to see "what's next", both in terms of visuals and story; mentioning such as Grim Fandango and Broken Sword as key inspirations for the core mechanics, while mentioning titles such as Tomb Raider (1996) and Hotel Dusk: Room 215 as influences for the puzzle-solving. The gritty, noir atmosphere is heavily inspired from Max Payne, as Rodrigues has mentioned it being the first time he understood that games could go "that route" narratively. Rodrigues authored an article for Game Developer elaborating on how point-and-click mechanics can serve as a vehicle for a psychological thriller in the form of a video game, using Gloomy Juncture as a case study, exploring how puzzles and visual design can reflect a character's mental decline.

Rodrigues teased the first public demo in November 2023 at DevGAMM, during Indie X, where it was nominated for Best Portuguese Game. The first public demo was released in February 2024 on Steam as part of Steam Next Fest. The feedback from these events was positive, so Rodrigues began to further expand the game's story scope and themes. He has stated this created an extra challenge with him expanding the hand-drawn assets, writing the extra dialogue for the scenes, and hiring extra professional voice actors found on Fiverr capable of performing the specific noir accents.

Rodrigues has stated he is not worried about how Gloomy Juncture performs financially, as he considers it a passion project and decided to reject publishers so he can be true to the story being told, and not pressuring himself with marketing algorithms or deadlines.

== Reception ==
Prior to release, Gloomy Juncture received attention from the video game industry and press. EDGE Magazine featured the game in issue 418 with an exclusive interview and preview, writing that "Rodrigues rejects convention, and Gloomy Juncture takes a series of unexpected turns, introducing new mechanics whenever its plot swerves require. A cruel world that nevertheless compels you to explore it, with a cast of hardened characters that you still feel sympathy for. There's a sweetness and warmth to its deadbeats and night owls."

VICE Magazine published a dedicated demo review, saying that "there are games like Gloomy Juncture that twist my brain around in such ways that I'll be unraveling it for days, or maybe even weeks. I am very clearly going to question not only my character's sanity, but my own. I genuinely believe that Gloomy Juncture could be one of the most talked-about indie games of the year when it releases." Rodrigues gave an early interview for Wireframe Magazine, with the game previewed in issue 66; the piece noted its cinematic influences and eerie tone, observing that it "veers closer to the pessimism and grimness of Taxi Driver and Oldboy as opposed to Hollywood's conventional blockbuster fare", and praised its innovative artstyle approach. Rock Paper Shotgun also included the game in an indie roundup of games with "non-game inspirations". GameDaily featured the game on Yahoo Entertainment, saying it's "one indie [game] to watch closely". The Nerdy Type published a dedicated preview and demo review, urging readers to "go and wishlist the game, download the demo, and fall in love with this indie masterpiece right alongside me." The game was also included in showcase roundups by outlets such as Game Informer and GameSpot. Spanish outlet HyperHype.es published an in-depth interview with Rodrigues.

The game has attracted attention from Asian outlets. Japanese video game website 4Gamer published an article dedicated to the game. GameMakers Japan published an interview focusing on the game's handcrafted art style and cinematic influences.

The game was featured in the September 2025 Six One Indie Showcase, receiving a special developer featurette and the world premiere of its official trailer, and was selected as a Breakout Game. Gaming critic Skill Up selected Gloomy Juncture as one of his top three games from the showcase, and Kinda Funny highlighted it as one of the standout games during a live reaction. The game was also selected for the Yogscast Tiny Teams 2024 live stream, where it was played by streamers Mousie and Rythian, and received praise for the graphics and the nature of puzzles from Save Your Game, a podcast hosted by PushingUpRoses and Matt Aukamp.

In Portugal, the game was covered on Portuguese national television by RTP Arena, in a live interview with Rodrigues, and received coverage in Brazil from Quebrando o Controle and Watermelo. Portuguese outlet Rubber Chicken published an in-depth interview covering the solo development process, Café Mais Geek conducted a live interview accompanied by a gameplay walkthrough, and the game was featured in Meus Jogos' roundup of Portuguese games to look for in 2026. A live interview with Rodrigues was also conducted by Glitch Gamecast at Game Dev Lisbon. The game was cited by the president of the APVP in a Tek Sapo year-in-review for bringing international recognition for Portuguese games.

The game's poster was selected for the Raw Fury "Games Are Art" initiative, exhibited in an art gallery during Reboot Develop Blue 2024 in Dubrovnik, Croatia.

At BitSummit Drift 2024 in Japan, Gloomy Juncture won the Visual Excellence Award. During the award ceremony, jury member and game designer Iida Kazutoshi described it as "a puzzle game in a chaotic world that calls in for your sanity. The paradoxical feeling of being drawn deeper into a person's world of madness the more puzzles you solve is very appealing, making it the most audacious work in the history of BitSummit." Game director SWERY (Deadly Premonition) selected it as one of his top five favourite games showcased at the event, stating that "the art style of Gloomy Juncture is breathtaking! This game immerses players in a mysterious noir world, and through its unique artstyle, makes you feel like you're inside the protagonist's complex mental state."

Prior to its release, Edge Magazine interviewed Rodrigues and featured the game. It won multiple awards, including the Visual Excellence Award at BitSummit Drift 2024 in Japan and Game of the Year at the Spotlight Awards 2024.

=== Awards and nominations ===
Prior to release, Gloomy Juncture won five awards. Notable wins include the Visual Excellence Award at BitSummit Drift 2024 — the largest and oldest indie game convention in Japan — the Bronze Award at the Tencent GWB Game Awards 2024 in China, and both Game of the Year and Reveal of the Year at the Spotlight Awards 2024 held at DevGAMM Portugal. The game was also nominated for the Critics' Choice Award at Indie Cup Europe 2024, Best Audio at the Indie Game Award 2026 held at the Taipei Game Show, Best Game from Portugal at DevGAMM Awards 2024, Indie of The Year at IndieDB Awards 2024, and Best Portuguese Game Award at Indie X 2023.

Year	Award	Category	Result	Ref
2024	BitSummit Drift	Visual Excellence Award	Won	
2024	Tencent GWB Game Awards	Bronze Award (Small Teams)	Won	
2024	Spotlight Awards	Game of the Year	Won	
2024	Spotlight Awards	Reveal of the Year	Won	
2024	TGAGWCAGA	Curviest Polygon Award	Won	
2024	Indie Cup Europe	Critics' Choice Award	Nominated	
2026	Indie Game Award (Taipei Game Show)	Best Audio	Nominated	
2024	DevGAMM Awards	Best Game From Portugal	Nominated	
2023	Indie X	Best Portuguese Game	Nominated	
2024	Reboot Art in Games, Develop Blue	Raw Fury Games Are Art Initiative	Finalist	
2024	IndieDB Indie of the Year Awards	Indie of the Year	Finalist	

== Filipe Rodrigues ==
Filipe Rodrigues
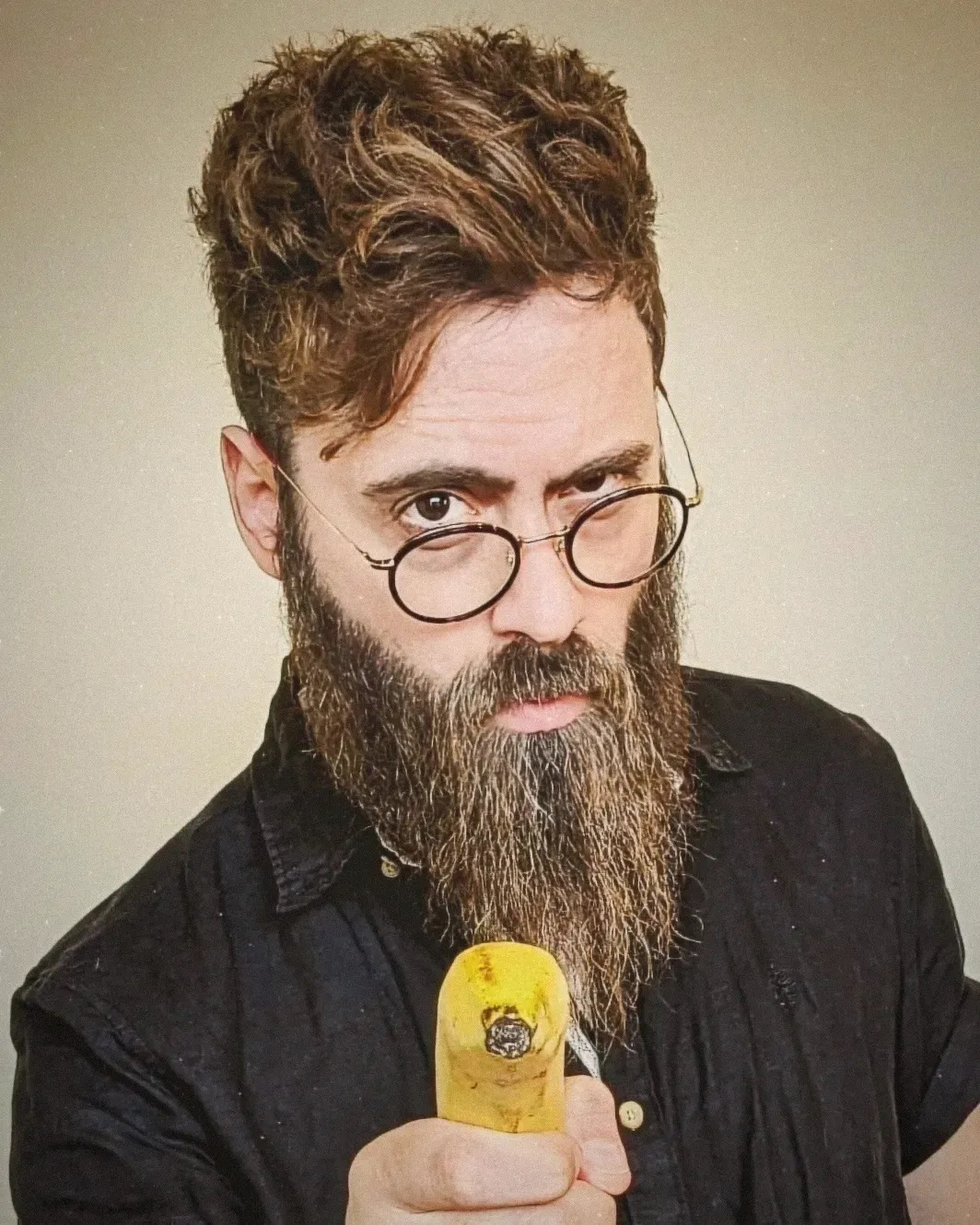
- Born: Porto, Portugal
- Other name: Subtales
- Education: Faculdade de Engenharia da Universidade do Porto, University of Porto
- Occupations: Video game developer; software engineer
- Known for: Gloomy Juncture
- Website: subtales.studio

Filipe Rodrigues, also known as Subtales, is a Portuguese indie game developer. He is known for developing Gloomy Juncture.

=== Early life ===
Filipe Rodrigues grew up in Vila do Conde, a coastal town north of Porto. He describes his first memory as seeing Super Mario Bros. running on a television in the window of an electronics shop in Póvoa de Varzim at around four or five years of age, which sparked a passion for video games. He subsequently received a Famiclone console.

Rodrigues grew up in a dysfunctional family, being exposed to substance abuse and domestic violence from an early age, with video games and horror films being a form of escapism during that time. He is a school dropout from seventh grade and worked as a waiter for several years before returning to night school around the age of 18 to complete mandatory education. He has spoken in a few interviews about facing mental health challenges from an early age and has cited these experiences as a major influence on the themes explored in his work.

Rodrigues pursued an academic and professional career in software engineering and digital media research at Faculdade de Engenharia da Universidade do Porto (FEUP), graduating in 2014.

=== Career ===
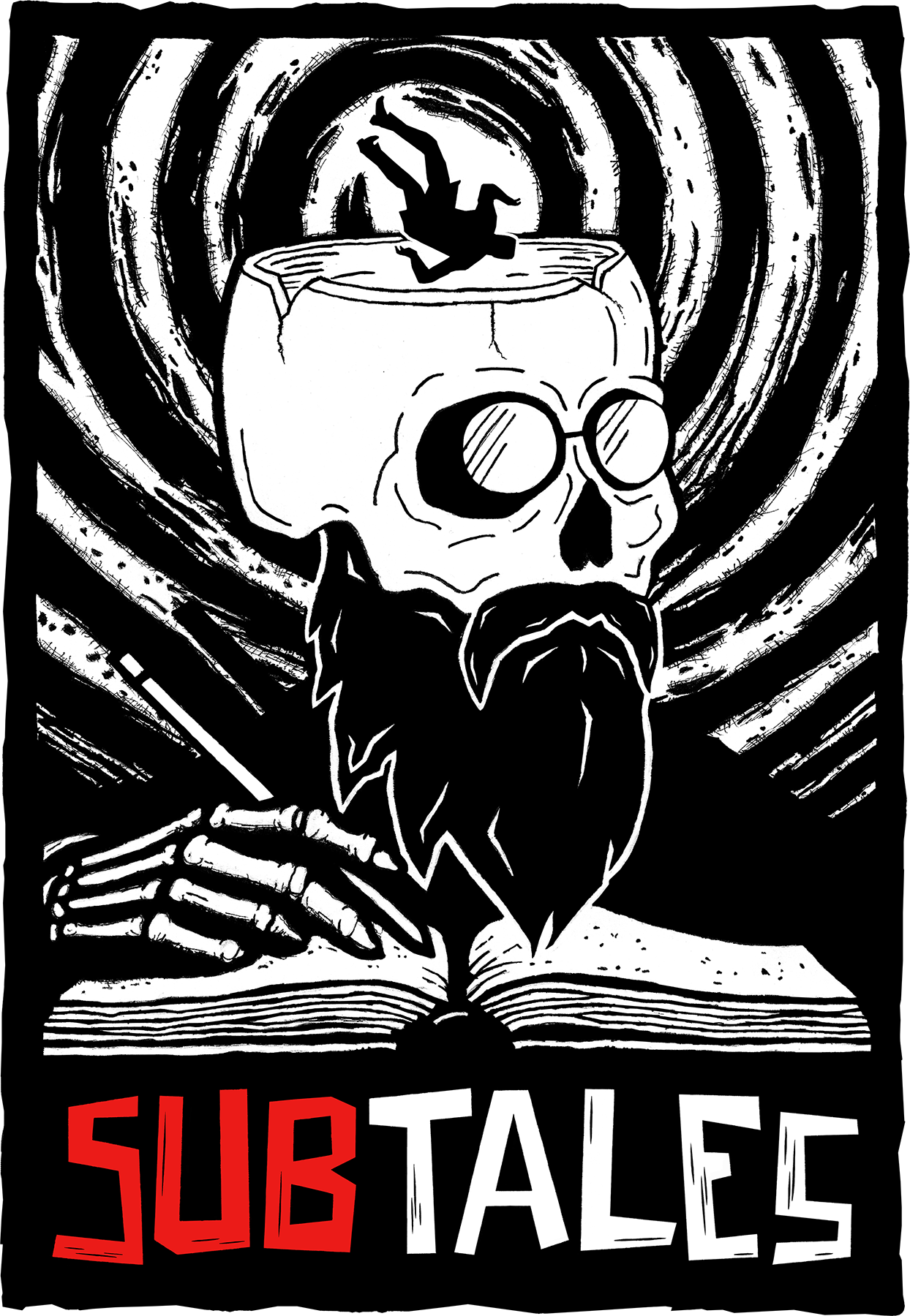
Subtales brand logo used by Rodrigues

==== Software engineering ====
Following his master's degree, Rodrigues worked as a software engineer, developing distributed systems and native mobile applications. After several years he sought a new direction, returning to FEUP to pursue doctoral research in digital media as a way of reconnecting with the world of games and computer graphics. Rodrigues completed the advanced studies phase of the programme, comprising the PhD coursework and thesis preparation, before pausing the remaining doctoral research during the COVID-19 pandemic due to health issues. During his time at FEUP, Rodrigues also lectured in computer graphics, virtual reality, computer vision, and video game development, and co-supervised master's theses in the Integrated Master in Informatics and Computing Engineering. He left his software engineering career entirely in 2023 to develop Gloomy Juncture full-time.

==== Game development ====
During the COVID-19 pandemic, Rodrigues needed to stay isolated due to health issues and began sketching game prototypes in late 2020. In 2021 the concept that became Gloomy Juncture took shape. He has described the project as deeply personal, with the story drawing on his own experiences growing up, and as a form of creative therapy. He began developing Gloomy Juncture part-time in 2021 during the COVID-19 pandemic before leaving his career as a software engineer to commit to the project full-time in 2023, funding it entirely from personal savings.

Rodrigues had the idea to create a game that would pull from his love for cinema and arts in general, while taking inspiration from his childhood until adult life. According to Rodrigues, he grew up in poverty while being exposed to substance abuse and domestic violence, which led to him dropping out of school around age 13. He has also stated that filmmaking is his biggest source of personal growth and inspiration.

Rodrigues handles every aspect of the game's development, including game design, programming, art, writing, sound design, and marketing, alongside his cat Link, whom he jokingly refers to as the official boss. The game's visual style results from a handcrafted pipeline he developed largely by accident: wanting to lean on his love of drawing while working within the limitations of solo development, Rodrigues began sketching characters on paper and experimenting with ways to bring them to life digitally, eventually discovering that folding the paper created an unexpected papercraft aesthetic, leading to what he calls a "reversed pipeline" from classical 3D modelling, with each hand-drawn object drawn with the 3D projection already in mind, then digitised and modelled in a low-poly three-dimensional style. He authored an article for Game Developer elaborating on how point-and-click mechanics can serve as a vehicle for psychological storytelling.

Prior to release, Gloomy Juncture attracted attention from the international press and industry, receiving coverage from EDGE Magazine, VICE, Wireframe, 4Gamer, Rock Paper Shotgun, Game Informer, and GameSpot, among others. In Portugal, Rodrigues was interviewed live on RTP Arena, the Portuguese national television, covering his personal story and journey as a solo developer. HyperHype.es published an in-depth interview with Rodrigues about his life and creative process, and Portuguese outlet Rubber Chicken also published an in-depth interview covering the solo development process. A live interview with Rodrigues was conducted by Glitch Gamecast at Game Dev Lisbon. He was also invited as an industry guest on the Combo Up! podcast to discuss the games industry.

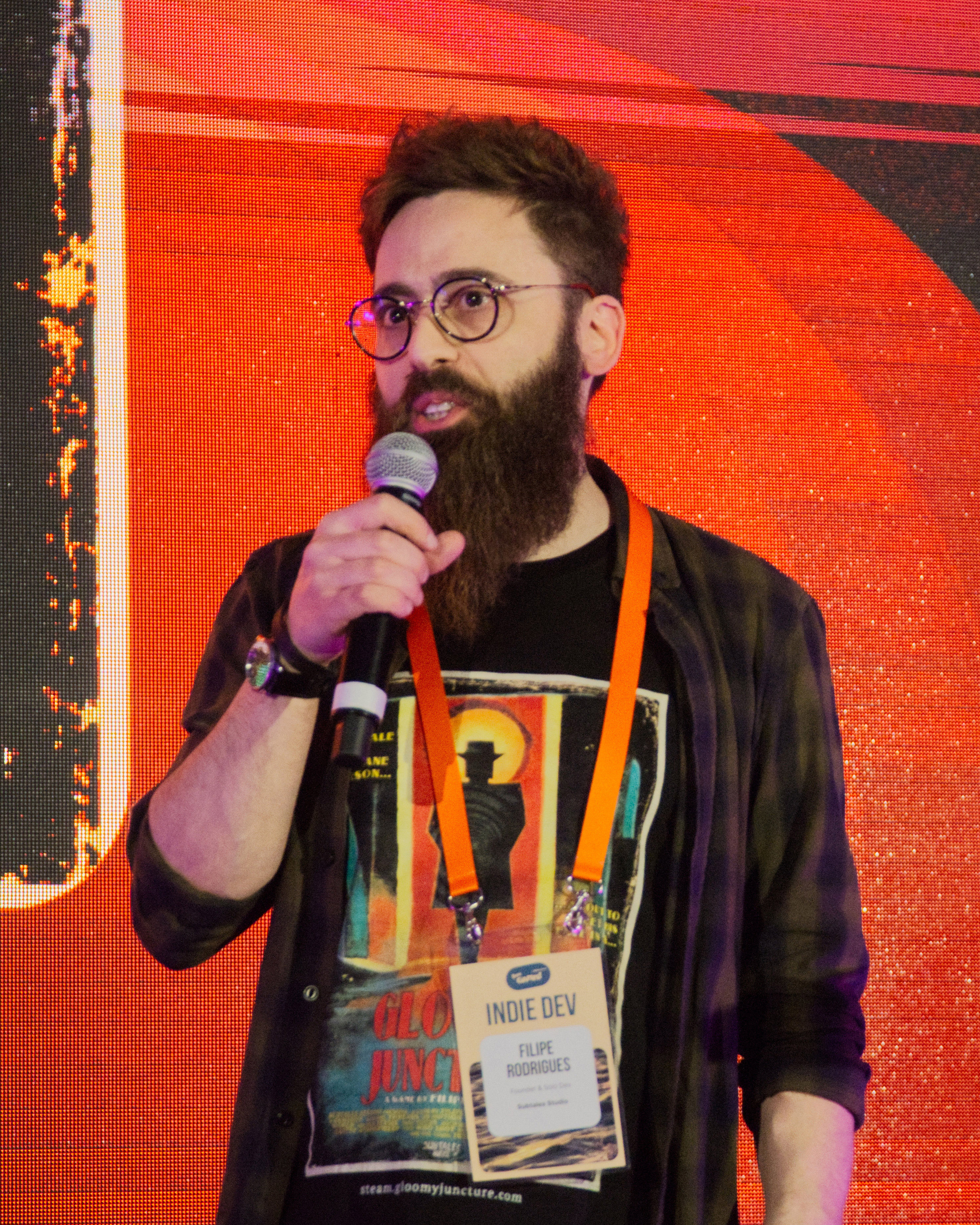
Filipe Rodrigues speaking at DevGAMM Portugal 2024, where Gloomy Juncture won Game of the Year and Reveal of the Year at the Spotlight Awards

Gloomy Juncture is being critically praised, winning several awards including the Visual Excellence Award at BitSummit Drift 2024 in Japan, the Bronze Award at the Tencent GWB Game Awards 2024 in China, and both Game of the Year and Reveal of the Year from the Portuguese industry at the Spotlight Awards 2024, held at DevGAMM Portugal. The game was also nominated for the Critics' Choice Award at Indie Cup Europe 2024, Best Audio at the Indie Game Award 2026 held at the Taipei Game Show in Taipei, Best Game from Portugal at DevGAMM Awards 2024, Indie of the Year at IndieDB Awards 2024, and Best Portuguese Game at Indie X 2023. The game's poster was also selected for the Raw Fury "Games Are Art" initiative, exhibited in an art gallery during Reboot Develop Blue 2024 in Dubrovnik, Croatia.

Rodrigues has stated he rejected publisher offers in order to take control, and remain true to the story he wanted to tell, and is not focused on the game's financial performance, considering it a passion project.

=== Games developed ===
Year	Title	Platforms	Notes
TBA	Gloomy Juncture	PC, Mac	Upcoming; solo-developed
