= Casagrande Group =

- Casagrande SPA logo
- Company type: S.p.A. (public limited company)
- Industry: Machines and equipment manufacturer
- Founded: 1963, Italy
- Headquarters: Pordenone, Italy
- Area served: Worldwide
- Subsidiaries: Casagrande S.p.A. (website) Hütte Bohrtechnik (website); H-C Bohrtechnik; IMM; SC EEC; SC Constructii; Casagrande USA Casagrande India
- Website: casagrandegroup.com

Casagrande Group is an international industrial group involved in the design, manufacturing, and distribution of machinery and equipment for foundation engineering, geotechnical applications, drilling, and related mechanical components.

The group includes several companies located in Europe, North America, and Asia operating in manufacturing, engineering, and commercial distribution. The companies collaborate in the development of drilling technologies, geotechnical equipment, structural steelwork, and mechanical components used in foundation construction and civil engineering projects.

== History ==
The origins of the group are connected to the foundation of Casagrande S.p.A. in 1963 by Bruno Casagrande in Italy. Over time, additional companies specializing in drilling technology, mechanical manufacturing, engineering services, and international distribution were incorporated into the group structure.

The group expanded internationally through the establishment of commercial branches and the acquisition or integration of companies operating in drilling technology, engineering design, and structural steelwork.

== Structure ==
Casagrande Group includes manufacturing companies, engineering companies, and commercial branches supporting the production and distribution of drilling and foundation equipment worldwide. The structure integrates production, engineering design, and international distribution activities.

== Companies ==
=== Casagrande S.p.A. (Italy) ===
Casagrande S.p.A., headquartered in Italy, designs and manufactures machinery for foundation engineering. Its production includes:

- piling rigs
- equipment for diaphragm walls
- micropiling machinery
- anchoring equipment
- jet grouting machinery
- tunnel consolidation equipment

The company represents the main manufacturing entity within the group.

=== Casagrande India ===
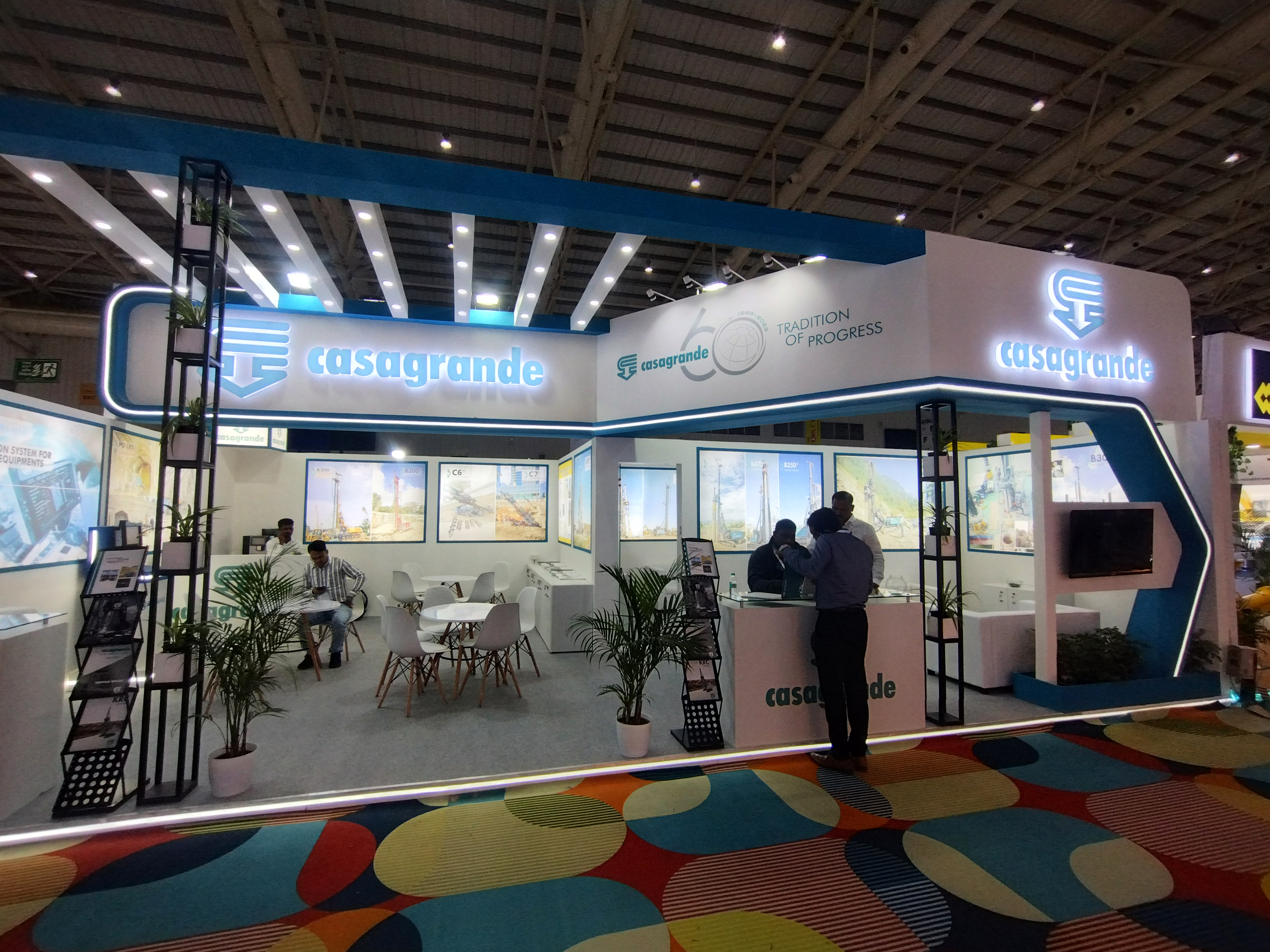
Casagrande India at EXCON 2025, BIEC

Casagrande India operates as a commercial branch responsible for the distribution of Casagrande products in the Middle East.

=== Casagrande USA ===
Casagrande USA is the group’s commercial branch for the United States market and handles the distribution of Casagrande equipment and related services in North America.

=== Hütte Bohrtechnik (Germany) ===
Hütte Bohrtechnik GmbH is a German manufacturer within the group specializing in hydraulic drilling rigs and related equipment used in:

- geothermal drilling
- micropiling
- civil engineering

=== H-C Bohrtechnik (Switzerland) ===
H-C Bohrtechnik manufactures and distributes hydraulic drilling equipment and accessories for geothermal drilling, micropiling, and civil engineering projects.

=== IMM (Italy) ===
IMM operates in Italy and specializes in precision mechanical manufacturing and structural steelwork. The company produces custom mechanical components and structural elements used in drilling equipment.

=== SC EEC (Romania) ===
SC EEC provides engineering and design services for structural steelwork used in Casagrande machines. Its activities include:

- structural steelwork project design
- 3D modelling
- 2D technical drawings
- preparation of project control plans

=== SC Constructii (Romania) ===
SC Constructii specializes in medium and heavy structural steelwork and mechanical processing for companies within the group.

== Activities ==
Companies within Casagrande Group operate in several industrial and engineering fields, including:

- foundation engineering equipment
- geotechnical drilling machinery
- geothermal drilling equipment
- micropiling and anchoring systems
- mechanical manufacturing and structural steelwork
- engineering design and technical documentation

These companies collaborate in the development, manufacturing, and distribution of machinery used in civil engineering and infrastructure construction projects.

== See also ==
- Deep foundation
- Geotechnical engineering
- Drilling rig
