= Montanhydraulik =

- Montanhydraulik GmbH logo

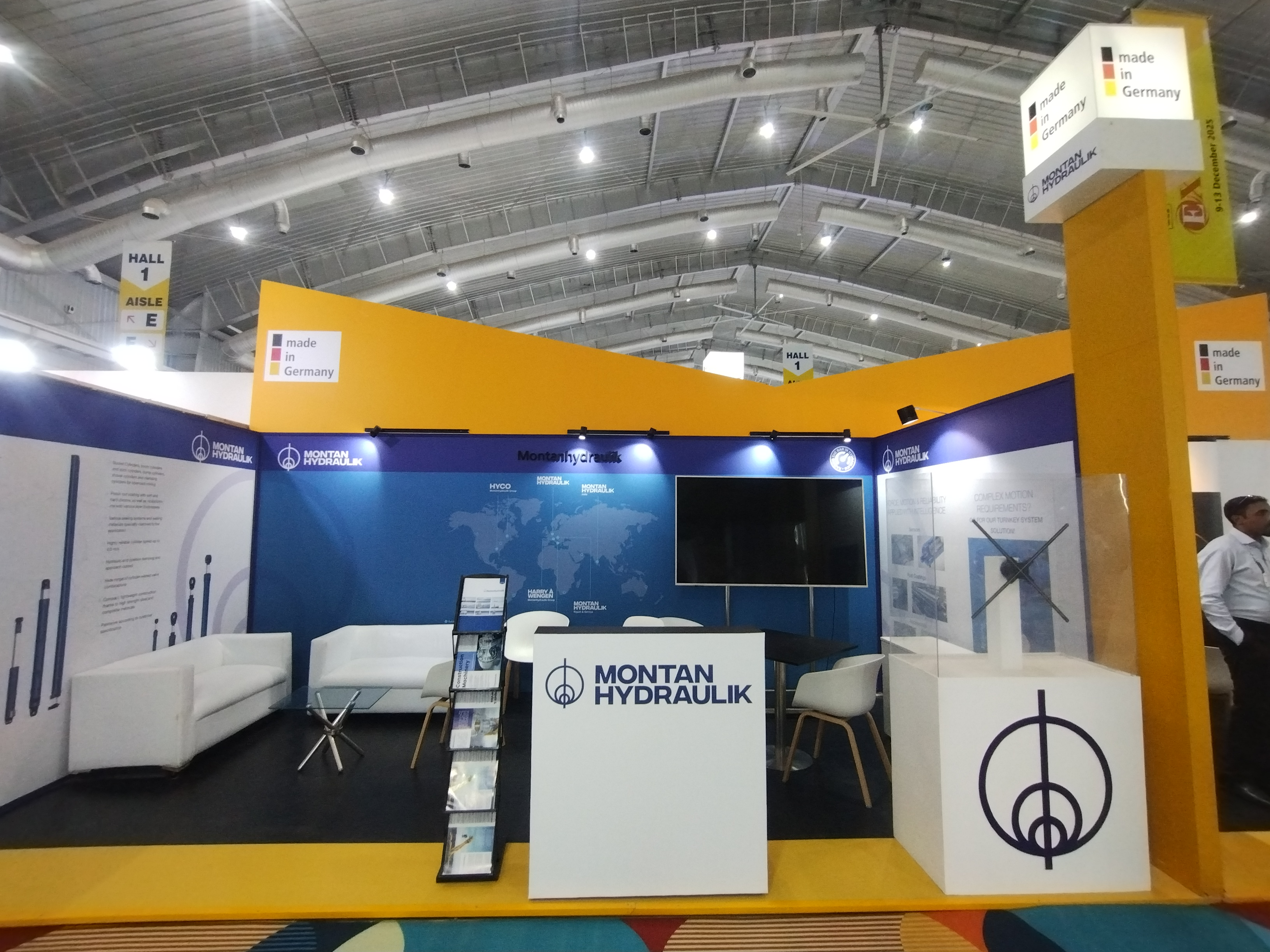
- Montanhydraulik at EXCON 2025, BIEC
- Trade name: Montanhydraulik GmbH
- Company type: GmbH
- Industry: Manufacturer
- Genre: Hydraulic cylinder
- Founded: 1952 in Holzwickede, Germany
- Headquarters: Holzwickede, Germany
- Number of locations: Germany, Italy, India, Canada, and the USA
- Area served: Worldwide
- Revenue: € 260 million
- Parent: Above 1,100
- Website: www.montanhydraulik.com/en

Montanhydraulik GmbH is German worldwide hydraulic cylinder manufacturer company.

Montanhydraulik participated in Bauma and EXCON exhibitions.

== Company ==
One Equity Partners (OEP) acquired Montanhydraulik on 16 December 2025.
