= Mindhack =

2023 video game

MINDHACK
- One of the logos for the game. Multiple characters from the game are depicted in the image, Newbie (bottom far left), Hugo (top far left), Unid (left), Captain (middle), SINO (right), COM_Z (top far right), Ivrig (bottom far right), FORMAT (wavy sensors), and Doctor (hands in the corners).
- Developer: VODKAdemo?
- Publishers: VODKAdemo?; room6 Inc.; yokaze
- Composer: Kotetsu Shoichiro
- Engine: Unity Engine
- Platforms: Windows; MacOS
- Release: Windows; MacOS; 5 April 2023 (Note: In early access)
- Genres: Adventure, Visual Novel
- Mode: Single-player

Mindhack (stylized as MINDHACK) is a 2023 text based adventure game developed and published by VODKAdemo?. The story follows a doctor who has the job of eradicating errors known as BUGs in an evildoer's personality and rewriting their minds turning them into happy-go-lucky saints. The game is in early access and is still receiving updates. The game is developed by VODKAdemo?, a small indie development studio from Japan. The team was founded in March of 2021 by three members, Realkey, Hodev, and Sassan03. The game's soundtrack was written and composed by Kotetsu Shoichiro.

The game is split into chapters with 1, 2, & 3 releasing with the game's release on 5 April 2023, Chapter 4 on 3 December 2023, Chapter 5 on 2 March 2025, and Chapter 6 on 5 February 2026. (Note: While the game was announced to come out on 6 April 2023 in December 2022, the actual release date was a day earlier on 5 April 2023.) There is planned to be around 8 or 9 chapters in total.

The game was previewed at BitSummit 2022. The game was also a part of the 2025 Tokyo Indie Game Summit.

Meg Pelliccio of TheGamer described the graphic style and premise as interesting, but found the gameplay repetitive.

== Characters ==
Unid

Captain

Ivrig

=== Major characters ===
- Doctor The Doctor is the main protagonist of the game, they are an impeccable Mindhacker who won the first ever Kids Mindhacking Championship.
- Captain Rebecca Thorn (better known as Captain) is the captain of the security team, HOTFIX, which originally was created as a paramilitary force meant to stop BUGs from manifesting by killing their hosts. The directive was later shifted to protect Mindhackers from their targets during their mindhacking sessions.
- Newbie Guard Shogo Komagome (better known as Newbie and Newbie Guard) is a member of HOTFIX, and is the sixth Mindhacking subject that players encounter in the game. He is the newest member, replacing a guard, Koreeda that was killed in the game's opening.
- FORMAT FORMAT is the AI that is in control of Mindhacking facility. She takes care of Doctor and constantly praises them for their work. She was created by a team that had help from a company so that there could be a way to scan for BUGs.
- Unid Unid is the first Mindhacking subject players encounter in the game. He is an anthropomorphic sea urchin that is the leader of a gang called Bloody Paella, which distributed a drug known as Gonbessa.
- Ivrig Kosuke Yamamura (better known as Ivrig) is the second Mindhacking subject that players encounter in the game. He is a college student who is a devout follower of a cult called LAGOM, which preaches that humanity must turn themselves into an inorganic state, so that they could get rid of BUGs, due to them believing that they are caused by human greed, and so when the end times come, that could be stored safely into God's house.
- SINO SINO is the third Mindhacking subject players encounter in the game. They were a former HOTFIX Scout, until being caught in a BUG burst, which transformed them into a BUG variant. After becoming a BUG variant, they began to enjoy and feel pleasure from the cries of pain from others, which led them to start torturing other people who were wounded on the battlefield. They were stopped by COM_Z who decapitated them via drones and then stored their mind in a floppy disk, believing that it might be possible to rehabilitate them.
- COM_Z COM_Z is a humanoid robot who is the fourth Mindhacking subject players encounter in the game. They are a professor who studies and creates new technologies related to Mindhacking.
- Hugo Hugo Patrick is the fifth Mindhacking subject players encounter in the game. He is an astronaut from Earth who was the pilot of a spaceship called Hermes. He has a wife and two children, both daughters.

=== Minor characters ===
- Experienced Guard Experienced Guard is a member of HOTFIX. He supervised Ivrig after his Mindhack.
- Support Guard Support Guard is a member of HOTFIX. He has a prosthetic arm.
- Bearded Guard Bearded Guard is a member of HOTFIX. He has a wife and daughter.
- Veteran Guard Veteran Guard is a member of HOTFIX. Unlike most of the members of HOTFIX which are grey humanoids, Veteran Guard resembles a stick figure and has greyish-blue skin. He has two sisters and one brother.
- Miki Miki Yamamura is Ivrig's younger sister. She is mentioned briefly in Chapter 2 when Ivrig explains his backstory during his Mindhack, and when he shouts her name after his Mindhack goes awry, she also appears in Chapter 4 to pick Ivrig up to bring him back home.
- Senior Guard Koreeda (also known as Senior Guard) was a member of HOTFIX. He is similar to most of the members of HOTFIX, with the only key difference being him having antlers. He is killed by a BUG manifestation in the game's opening, he is later replaced by Newbie.
