= USCO ITR Group =

Italian worldwide manufacturing company

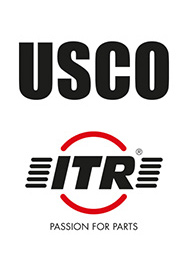
- USCO ITR Group logo
- Type: S.p.A. (public limited company)
- Founded: 1989 Italy
- Headquarters: Modena, Italy
- Area served: 5 continents, 174 countries
- Subsidiaries: ITR Africa; ITR Pacific; ITR Mining; ITR Agri; ITR New Zealand
- Website: USCO; ITR World

USCO ITR Group is an Italian worldwide manufacturer company. It is world's largest aftermarket supplier of earthmoving machinery parts.

== Media gallery ==
ITR at EXCON 2025, BIEC
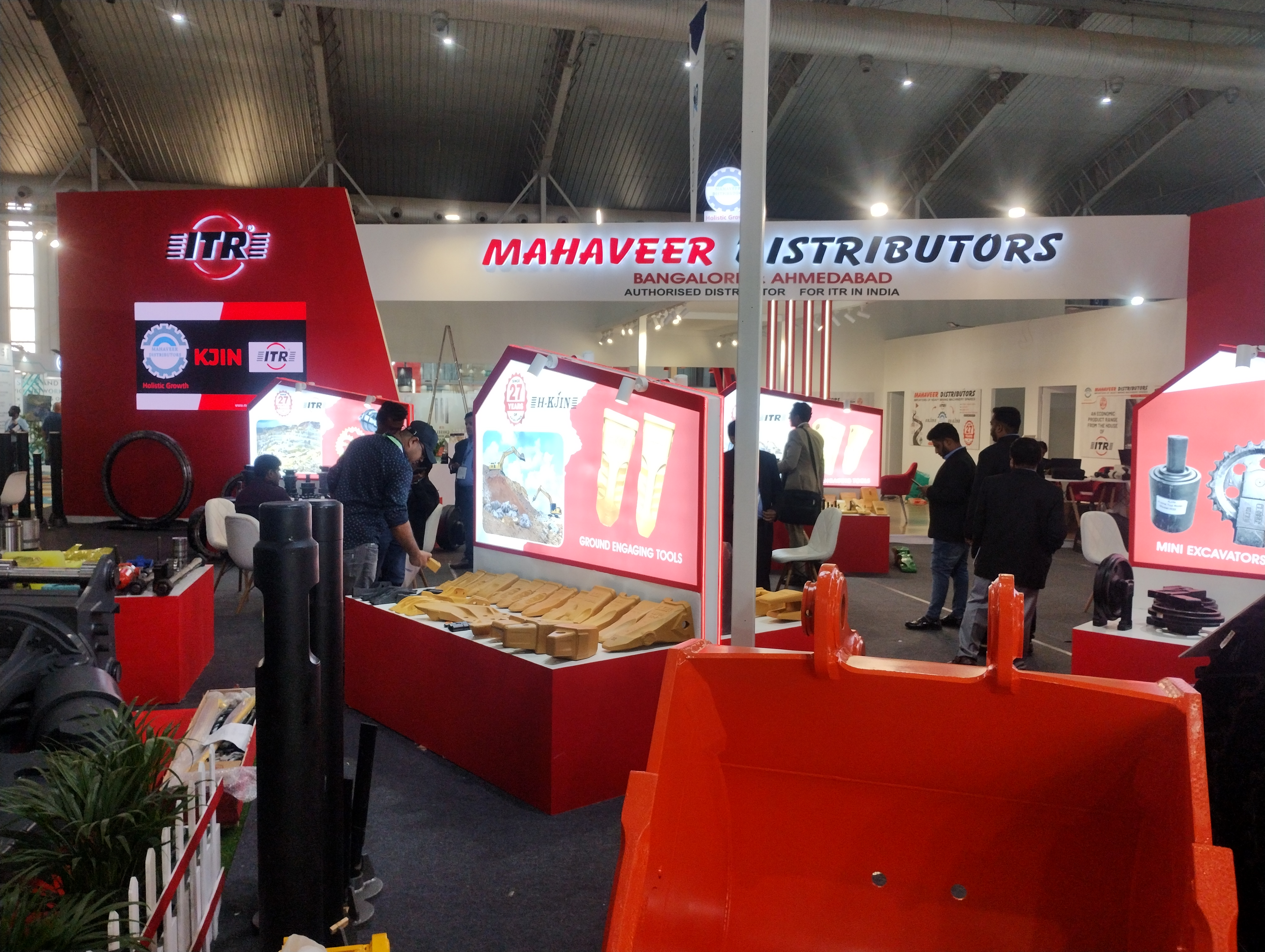

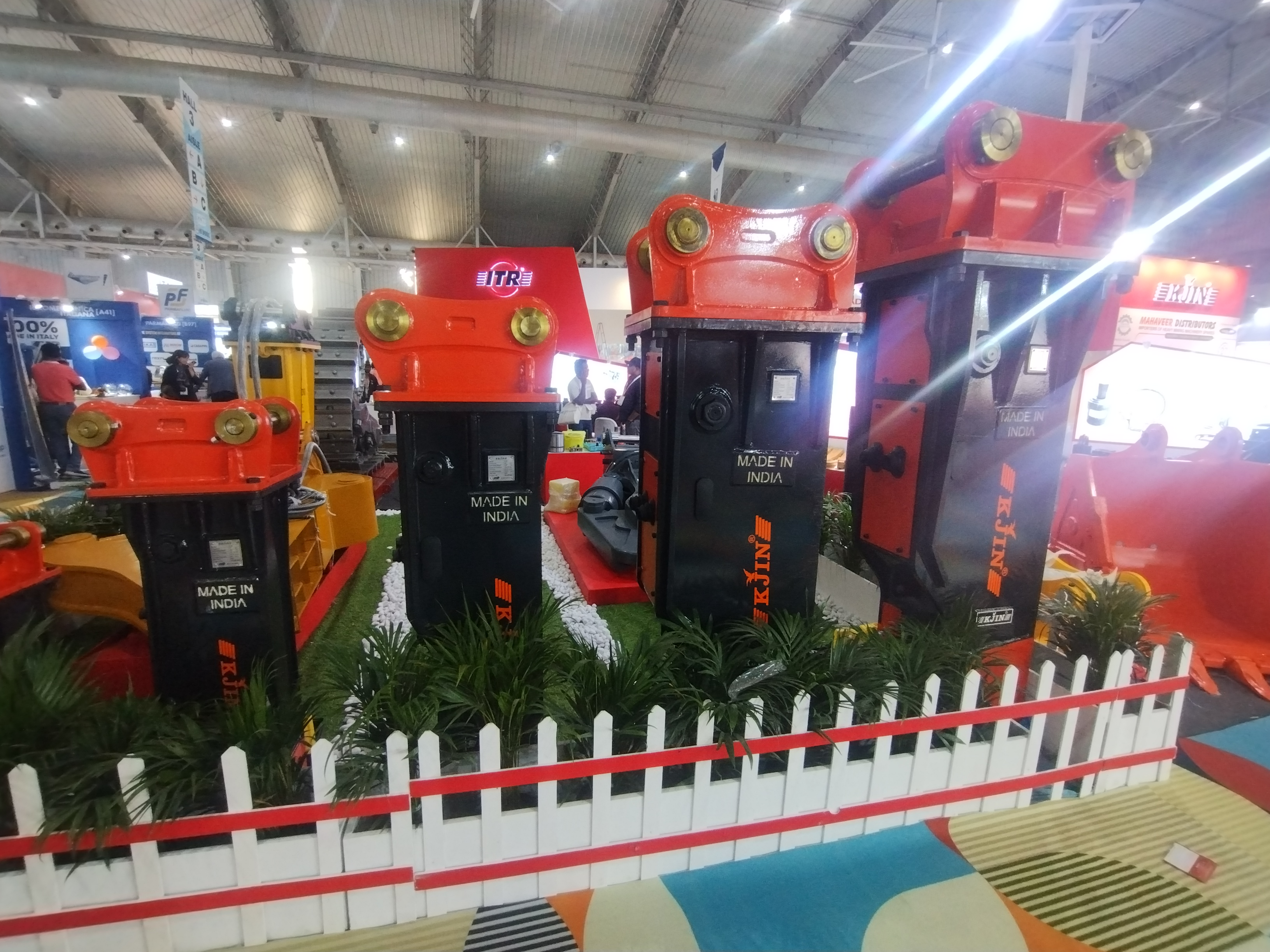

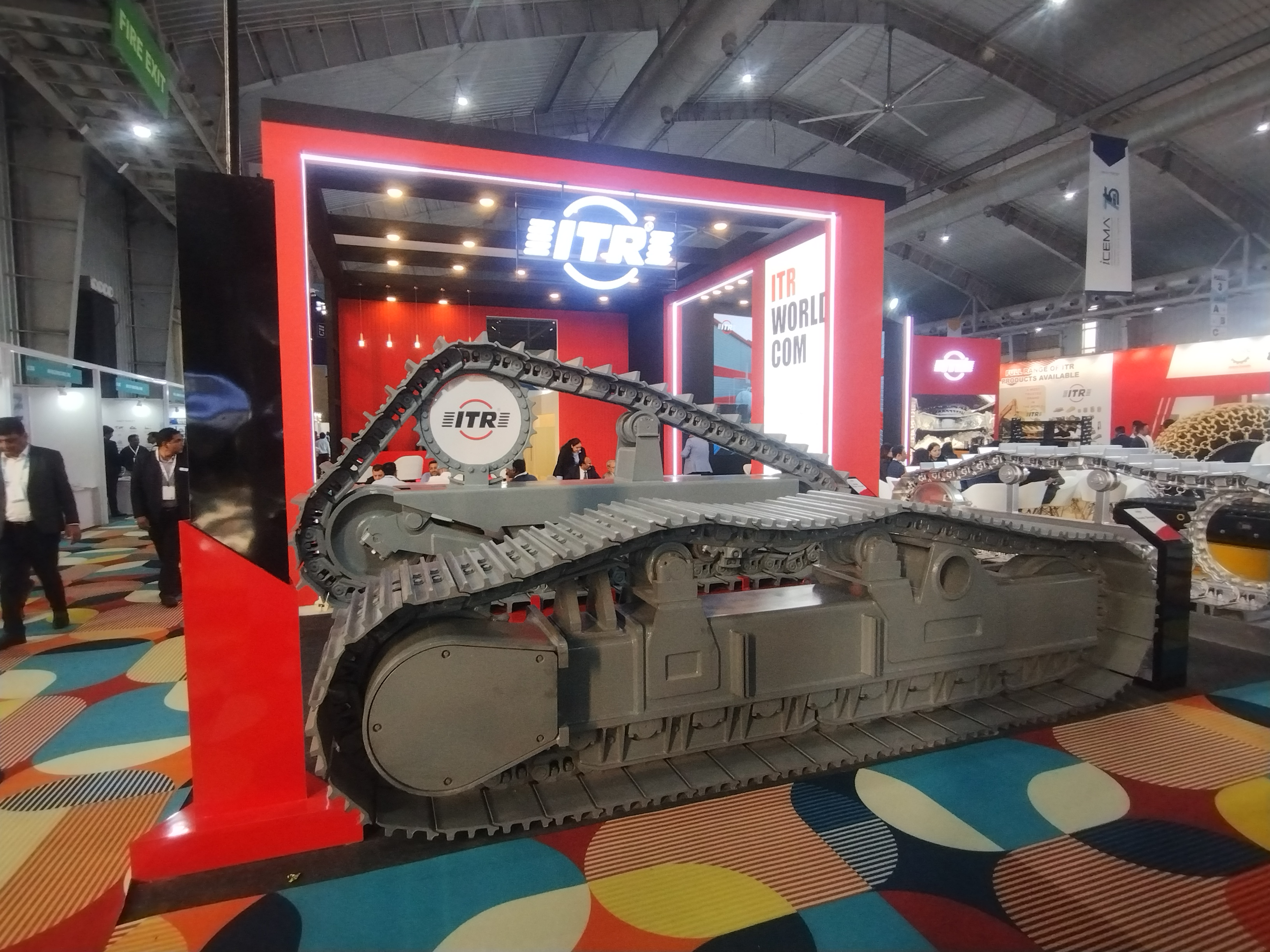

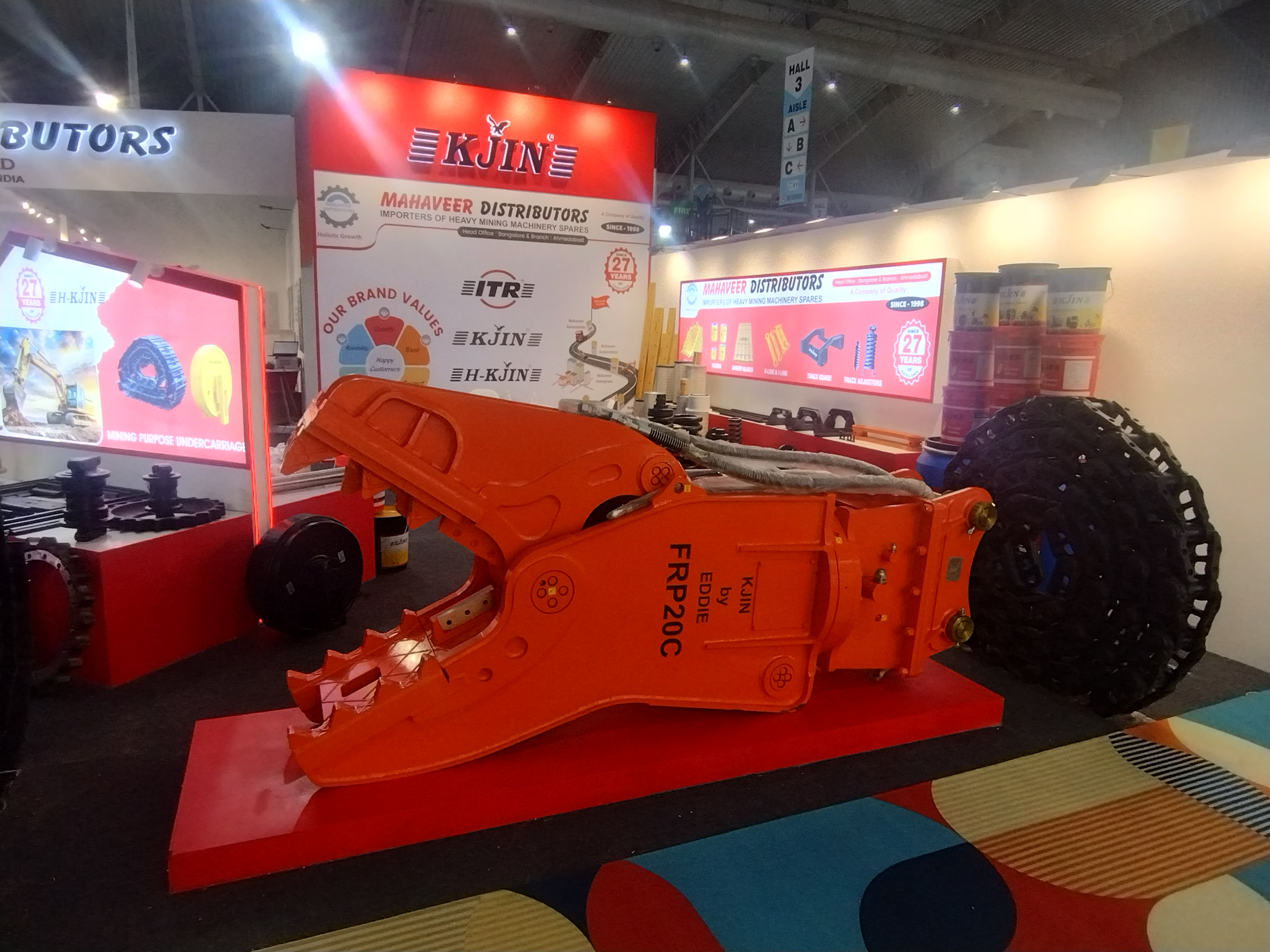

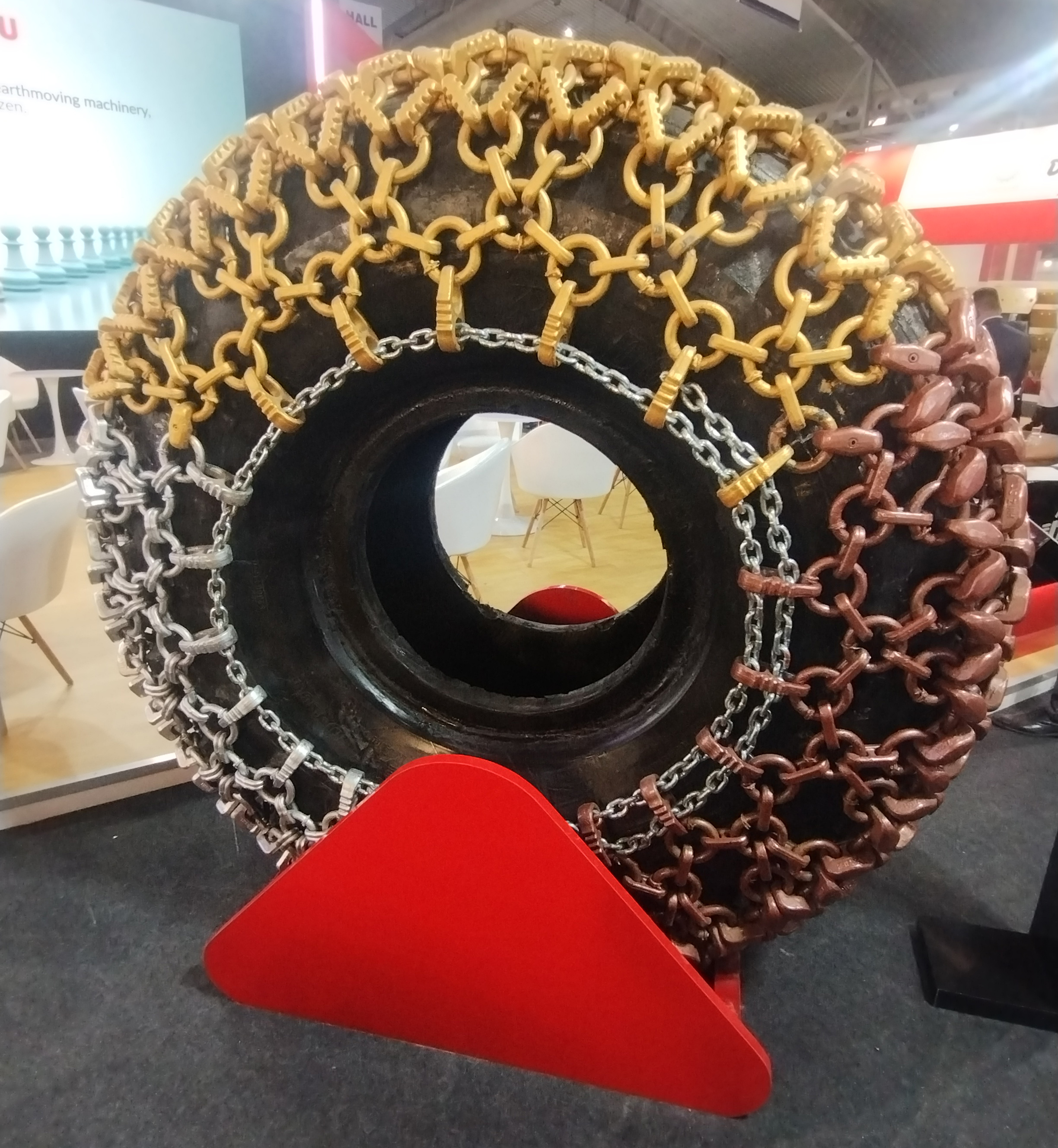

== History ==
USCO SpA was established in 1989 and USCO acquired ITR in 1994.
