= Puzzolana =

Indian manufacturing company

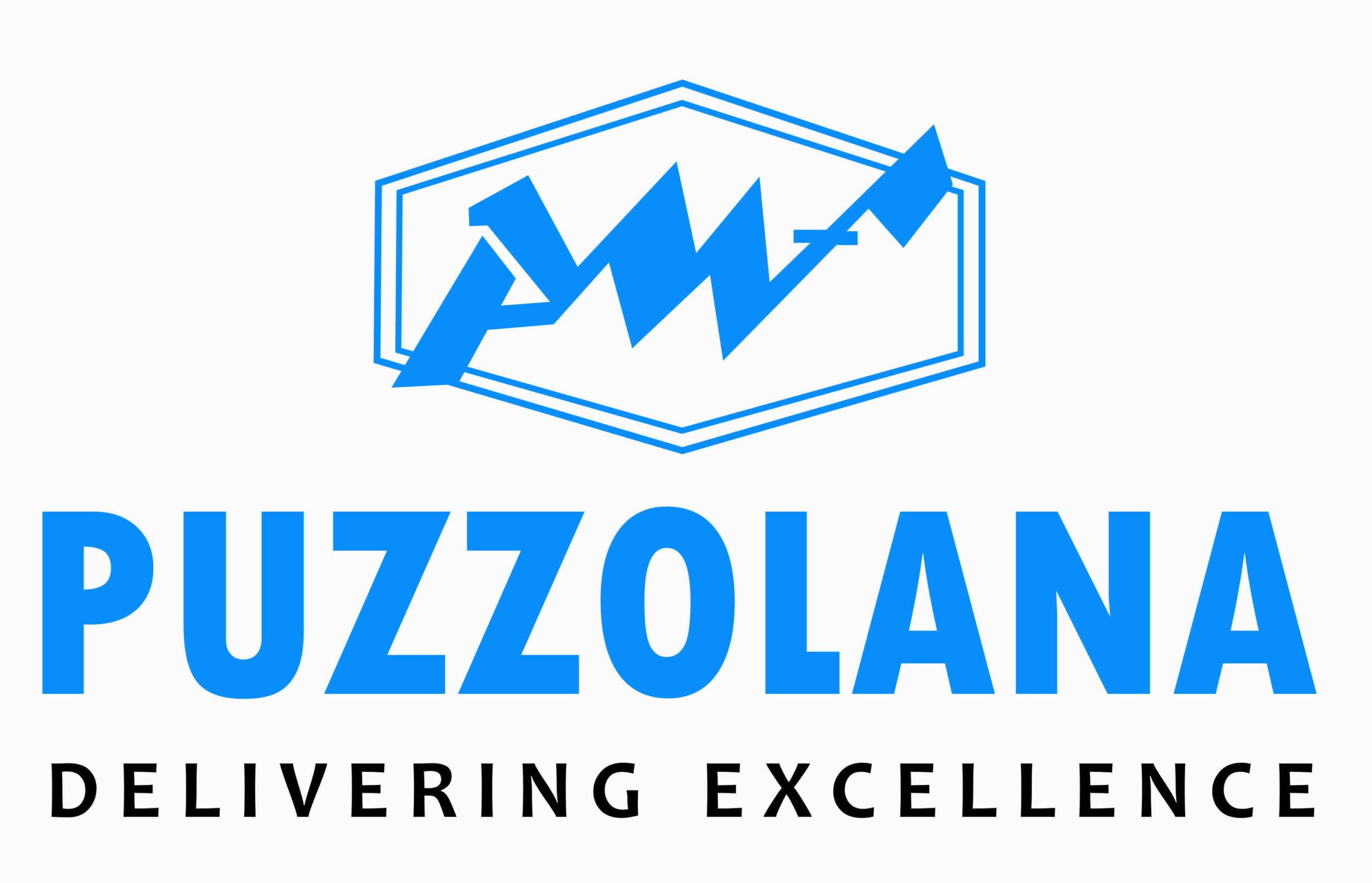
- Founded: Hyderabad
- Headquarters: Hyderabad, India
- Key people: Prakash Pai (Designated Partner) Anantha Pai (Designated Partner)
- Website: puzzolana.com

Puzzolana is an Indian manufacturing company specializing in crushing and screening equipment within the heavy machinery sector.

== Company ==
Puzzolana participated in Bauma and EXCON exhibitions.

== Media gallery ==
Puzzolana at EXCON 2025, BIEC
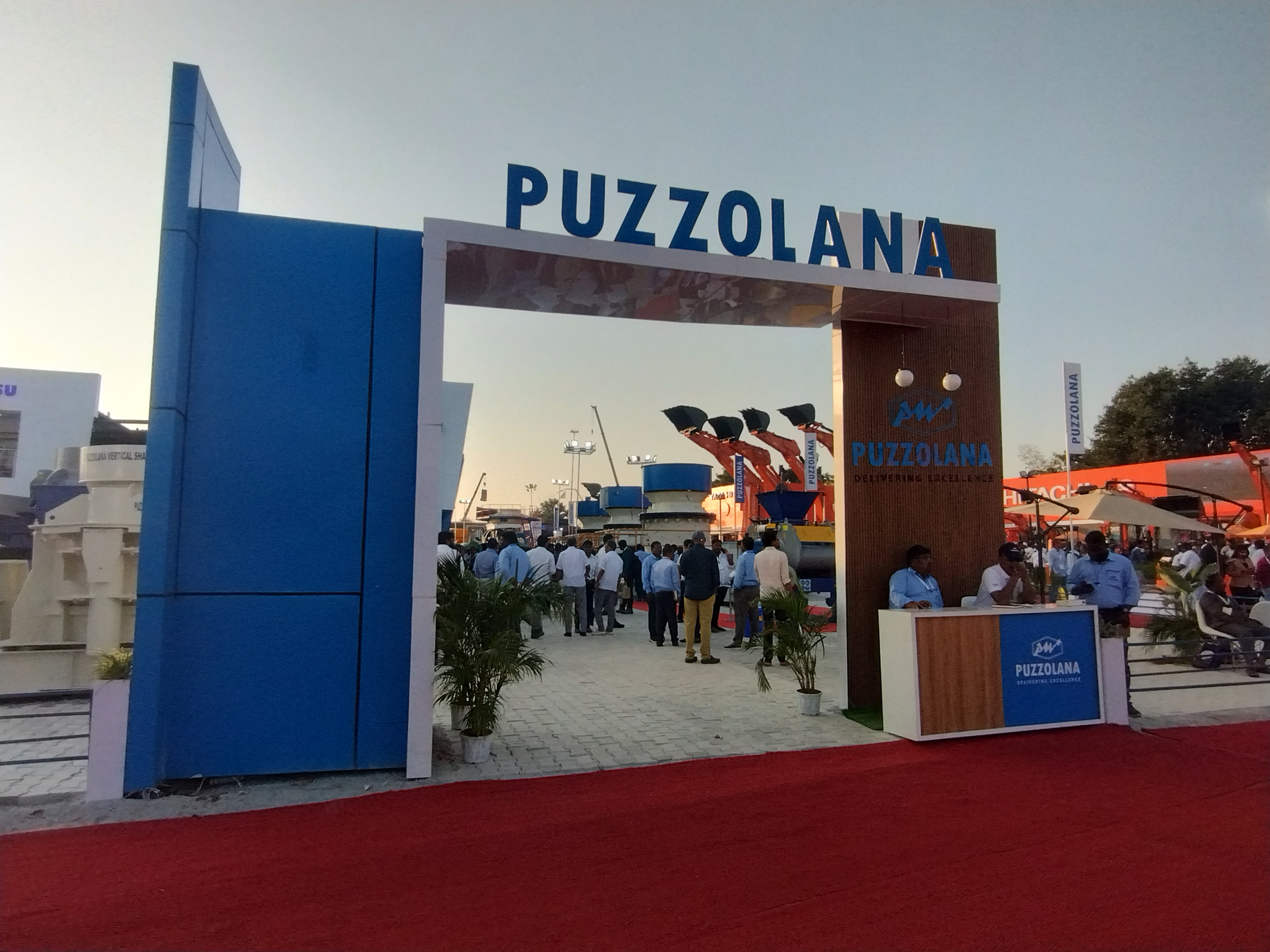

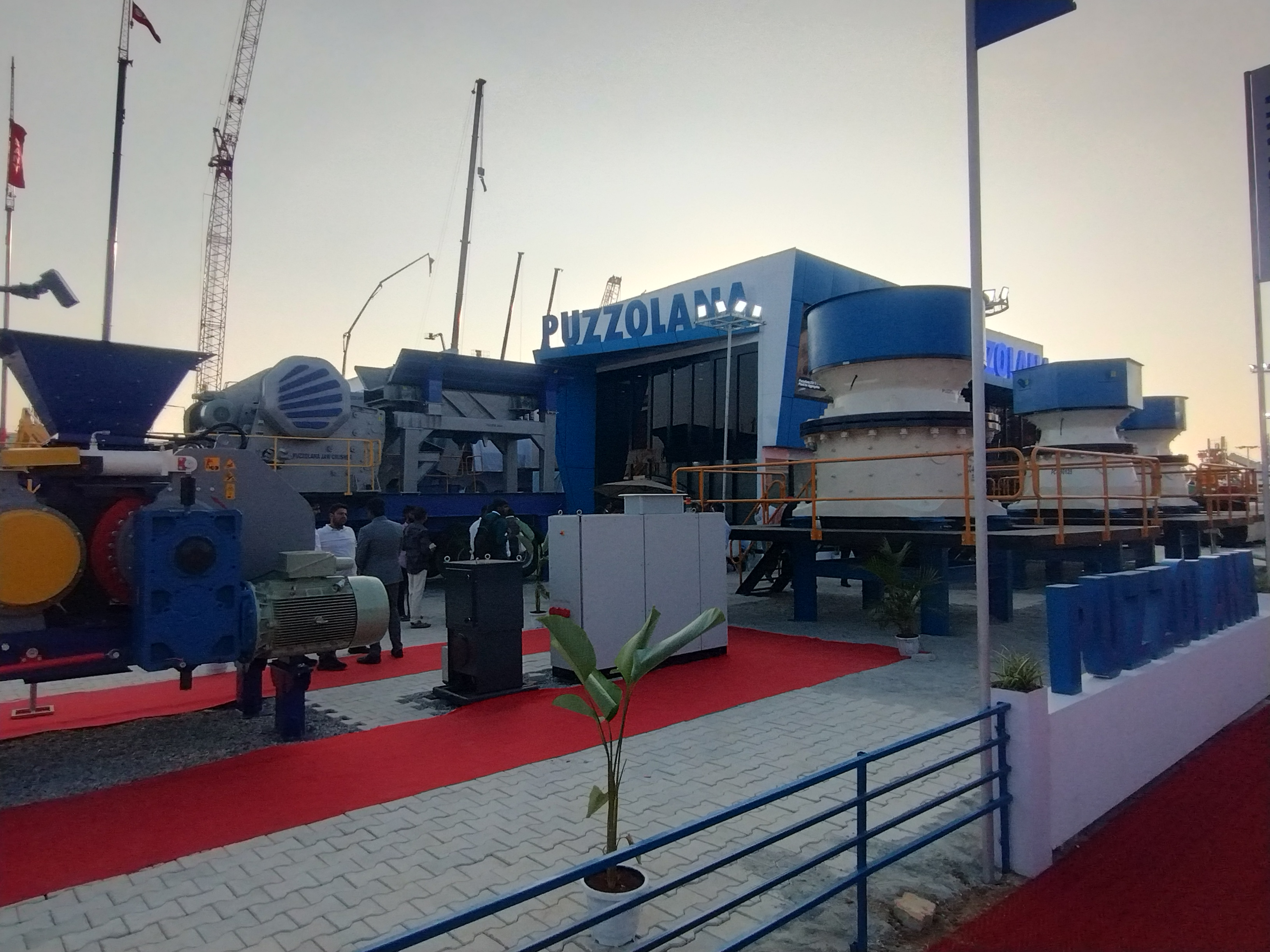
