= Smiley Monroe =

Irish worldwide manufacturer company

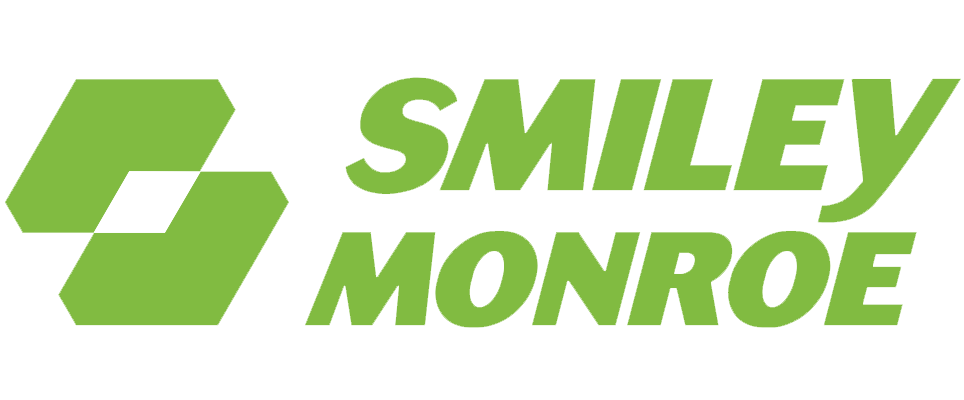
- Smiley Monroe logo
- Type: Public Limited
- Industry: Construction
- Founded: 1979, Northern Ireland
- Founder: Mark Smiley, Vaughan Monroe
- Successor: Chris Monroe
- Headquarters: Northern Ireland, Lisburn, Ireland
- Number of locations: Lisburn, Northern Ireland. Kentucky USA. Ilkeston, Great Britain. Hosur, Tamil Nadu, India.
- Area served: Northern Ireland, USA. India, Great Britain
- Key people: Chris Monroe, Tim Monroe
- Products: Conveyor Belts, ZipClip Belts, Rubber Parts, Impact Bars
- Website: smileymonroe.com

Smiley Monroe is an Irish worldwide manufacturer company of conveyor belts and rubber parts.

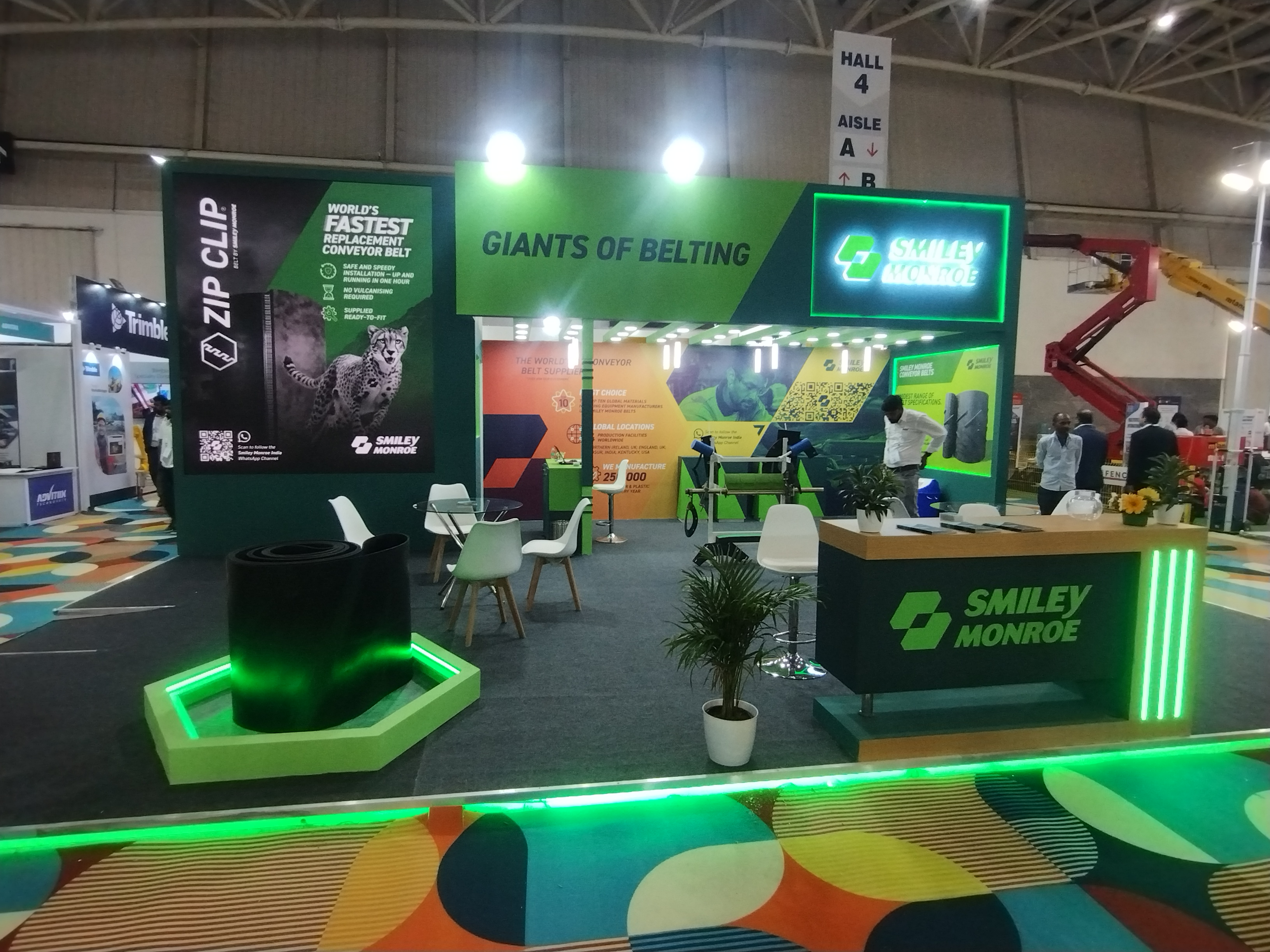
Smiley Monroe at EXCON 2025, BIEC
