= MP Filtri =

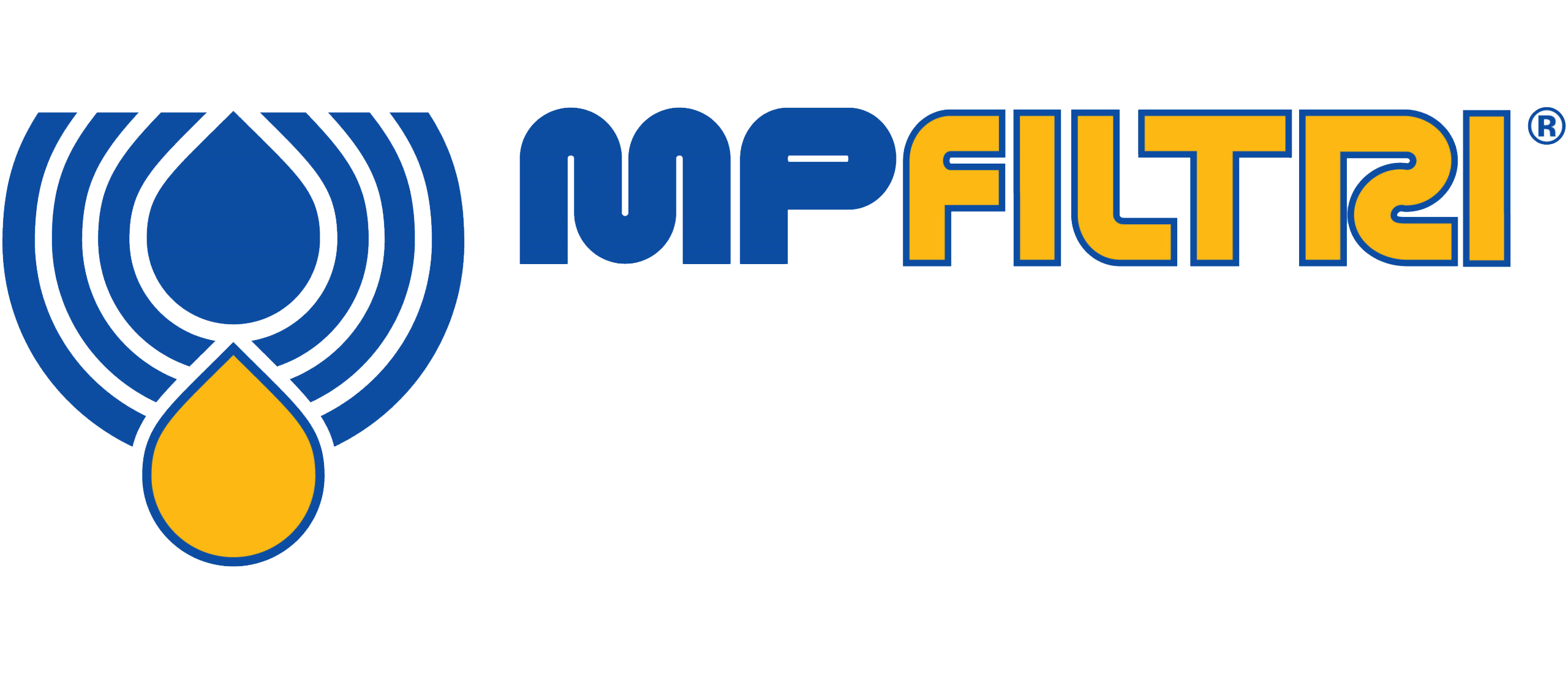
- MP Filtri logo
- Company type: S.p.A. (public limited company)
- Founded: 1964 in Italy
- Founder: Bruno Pasotto
- Headquarters: Milan, Italy
- Area served: Worldwide
- Number of employees: Over 300
- Website: www.mpfiltri.com

MP Filtri S.p.A. is an Italian worldwide company specializing in filtration products for the hydraulic fluids sector.

== Media gallery ==
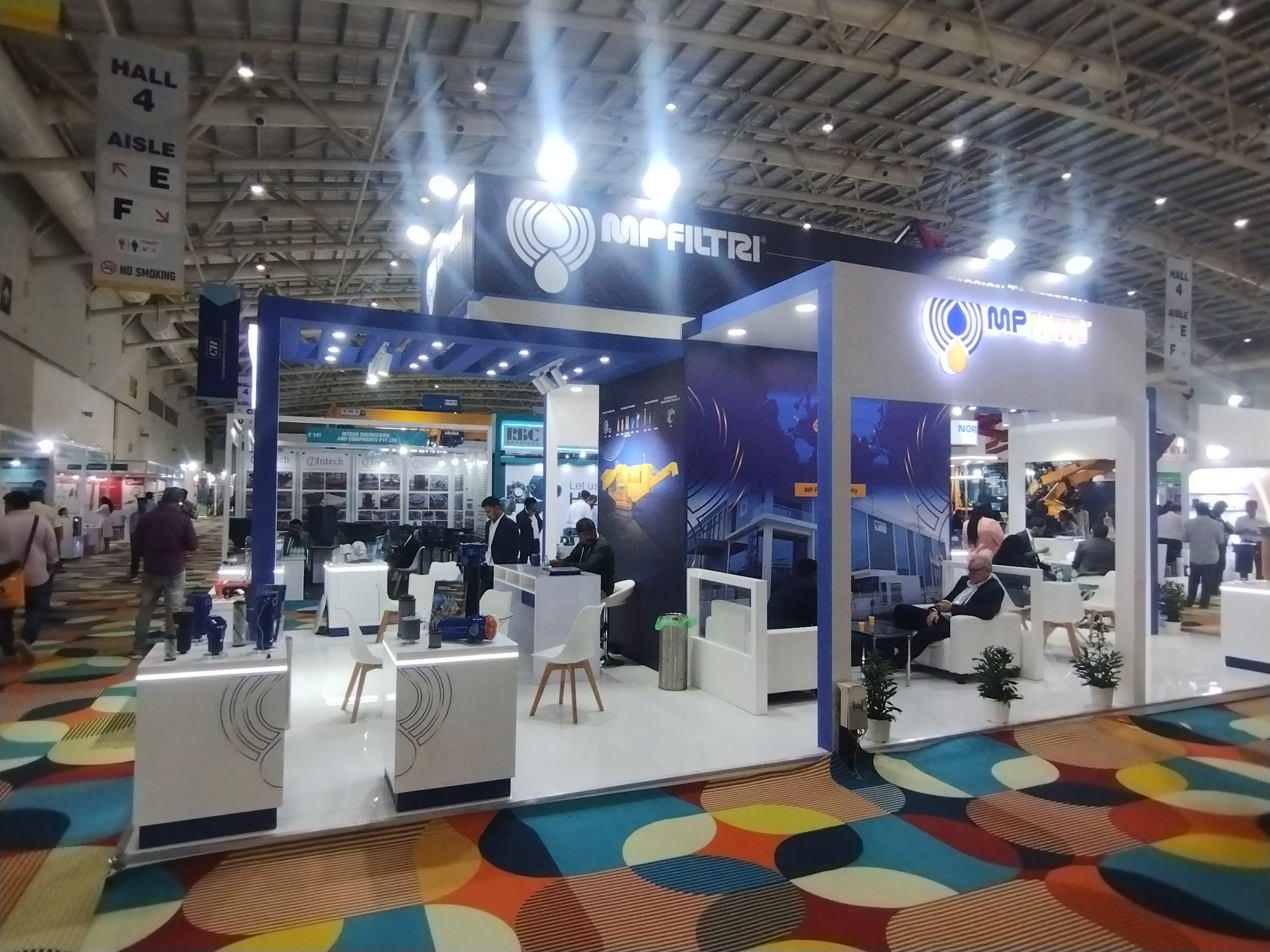
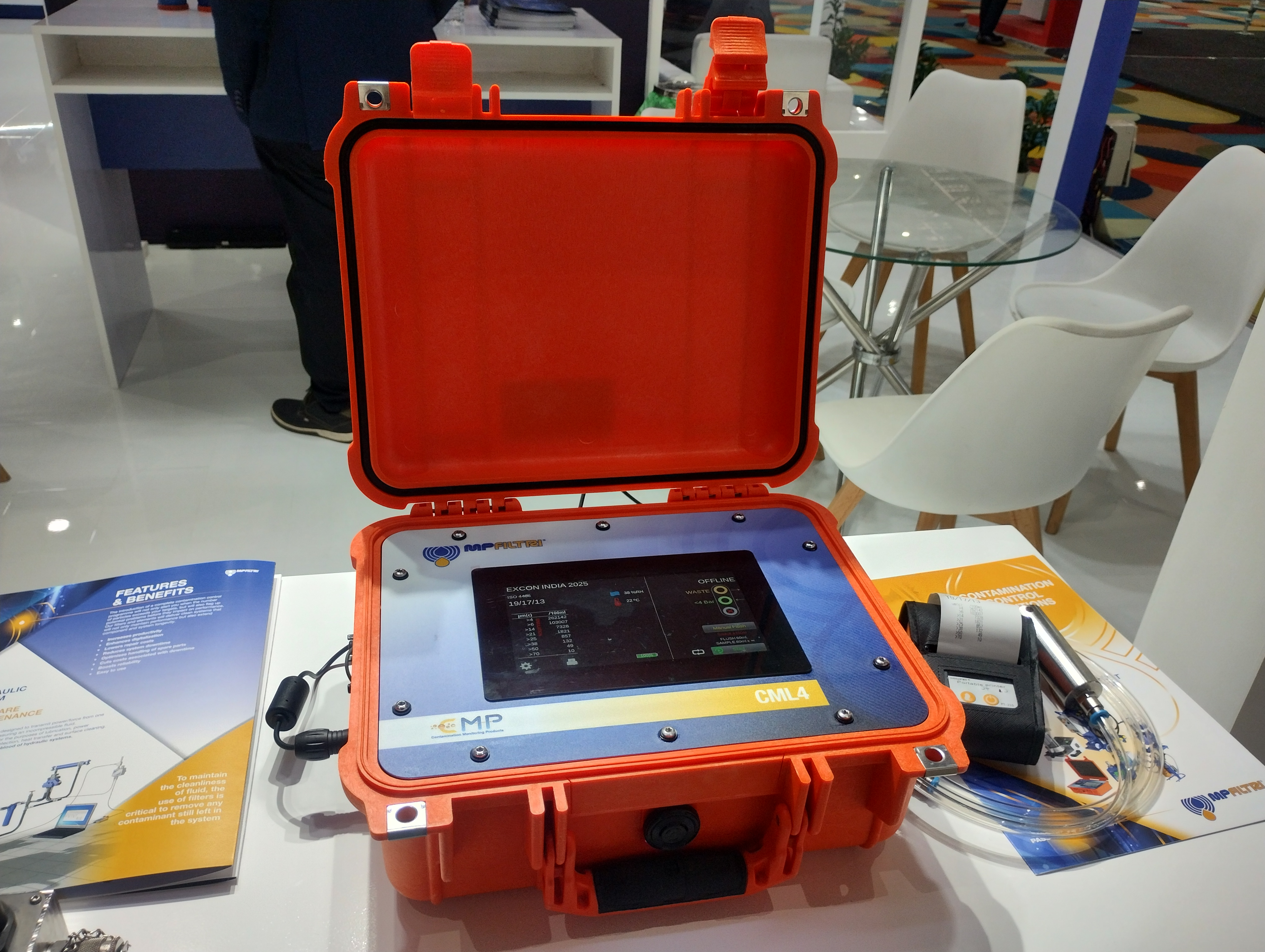
MP Filtri (left), MP Filtri's CML 4 (Portable hydraulic fluid contamination monitor) (right), at EXCON 2025, BIEC
