= Taipei Game Show =

Annual video game expo held in Taipei, Taiwan

- Status: Active
- Genre: Video Games
- Venue: Taipei Nangang Exhibition Center
- Location: Nangang District, Taipei
- Country: Taiwan
- Inaugurated: February 21, 2003; 23 years ago
- Most recent: February 16, 2026; 8 months ago
- Next event: January 21, 2027; 2 months' time
- Attendance: ▲370,000+ (2025)
- Organizer: Taipei Computer Association
- Website: tgs.tca.org.tw

Taipei Game Show (Chinese: 台北國際電玩展) is an annual video game trade show and consumer exhibition held in January or February at the Taipei Nangang Exhibition Center in Taipei, Taiwan. It is organized by the Taipei Computer Association and was first held at the Taipei World Trade Center in 2003 with an attendance of only 50,000.

The attendance has grown steadily over the years after being recognized by the The Global Association of the Exhibition Industry (UFI). According to Focus Taiwan, in 2025, the attendance exceeded 370,000 visitors with 346 companies from 30 countries. The trade show is also recognized as the biggest indie game exhibition in Asia.

Major international companies like Bandai Namco Entertainment, Sega, Capcom, PlayStation, Xbox, and MiHoYo have participated in past editions, alongside prominent Taiwanese companies including Softstar Entertainment and XFLAG Taiwan.
