= The Global Association of the Exhibition Industry =

UFI
- The Global Association of the Exhibition Industry (Union of International Fairs)
- Union des Foires Internationales (UFI)

- Location inside the European country of France Union des Foires Internationales (UFI) (France)
- Formation: April 15, 1925; 101 years ago
- Founded at: Milan, Italy
- Type: Non-political international association
- Legal status: Non profit
- Headquarters: Louise Michel, Levallois-Perret, France
- Coordinates: 48.888055562667°N 2.2855677687503°E
- Region served: 90+ countries
- Fields: International trade fair, exhibition
- Members: around 900
- Website: www.ufi.org

The Global Association of the Exhibition Industry (French:Union des Foires Internationales (UFI)) is an association of international trade fair organizers, exhibition park managers, national and international exhibition industry associations, and service providers with a global activity.

UFI operates in more than 90 countries and there are around 895 member organisations of UFI with more than 890 UFI approved events worldwide.

== History ==
UFI was founded on 15 April 1925 in Milan, Italy, by twenty of Europe's leading international trade fairs.

== Media gallery ==
Few UFI approved international events
Agritechnica

Bauma

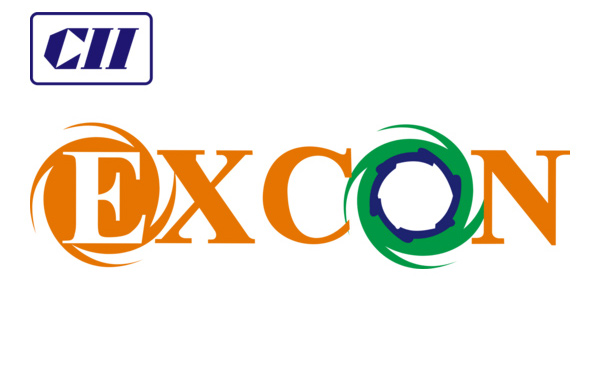
EXCON
