= Asobu =

Indie game incubator

Asobu is an indie game incubator based in Tokyo, Japan established in 2019. It broadcasts the Asobu Indie Showcase.

== History ==
Asobu was co-founded by Mark MacDonald (Enhance), Zen Chao (Makers Fund) and Anne Ferrero (documentary filmmaker) in 2019, with sponsors Makers Fund and ID@Xbox. Developers included Downwell creator Ojiro Fumoto and Chibi-Robo! director Kenichi Nishi.

It began broadcasting the annual Asobu Indie Showcase on September 21, 2020. Additionally, game demos and sales occur on online storefront Steam and are held as part of indie game event BitSummit.
