= EXCON =

Construction equipment trade fair

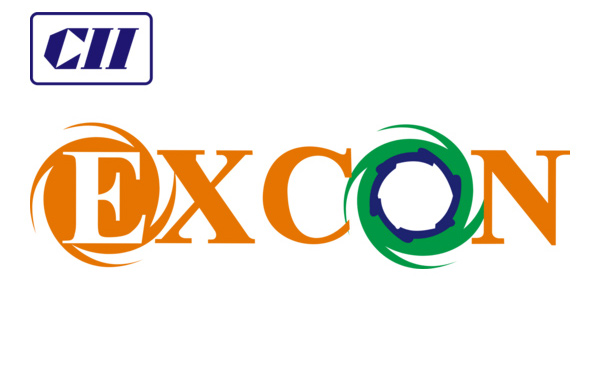
- Logo of EXCON

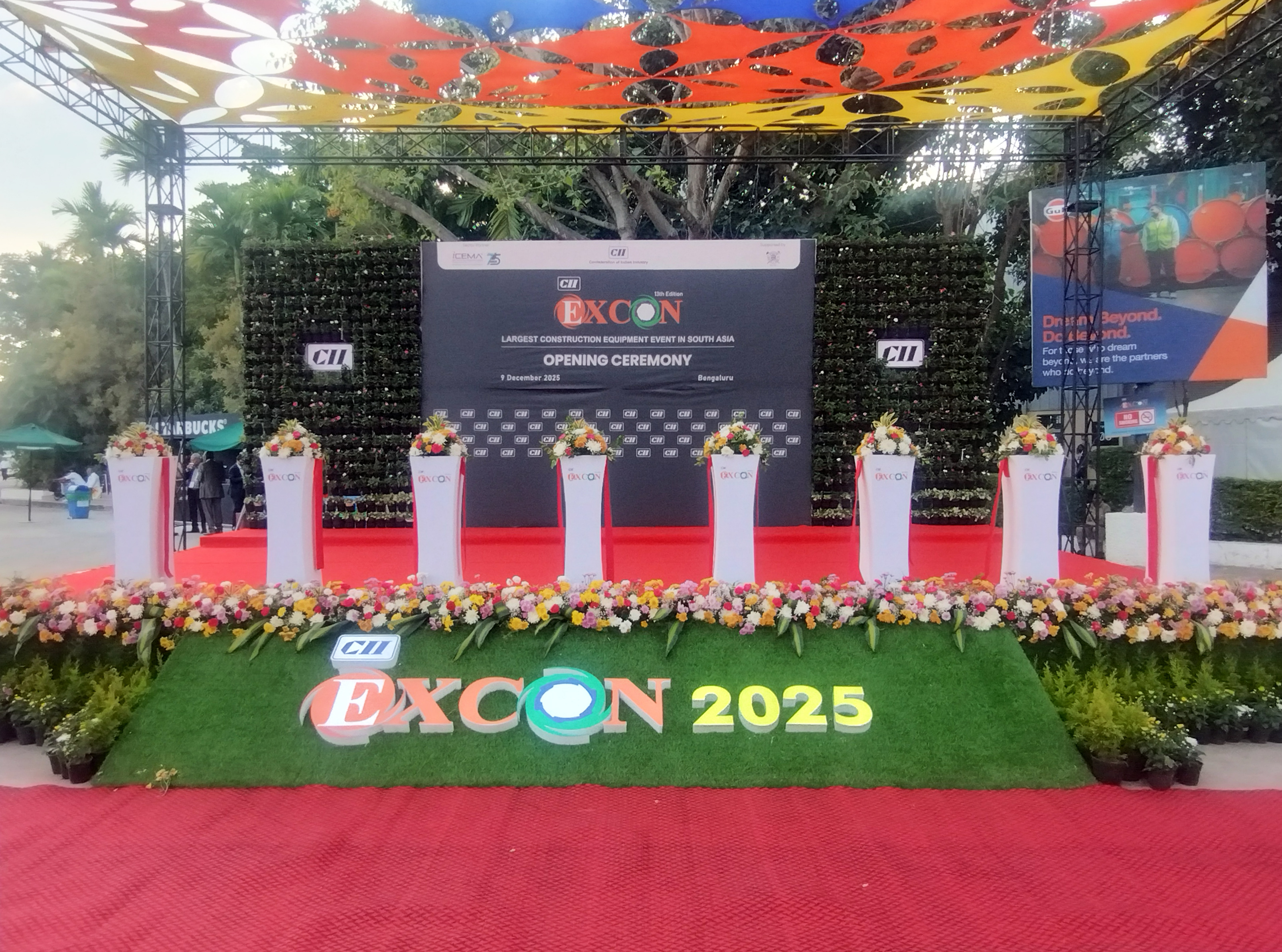
- Inauguration of EXCON 2025

- Location of the event EXCON (India)
- Time: (+5:30)
- Duration: 4 days
- Venue: Madavara, Bengaluru
- Location: BIEC, Bengaluru; 13.060919°N 77.47683°E
- Also known as: Exhibition on construction equipments
- Type: Exhibitions, conferences
- Theme: Building India’s Tomorrow (2025 event theme)
- Organised by: Confederation of Indian Industry (CII); Indian Construction Equipment Manufacturers Association (ICEMA)
- Participants: 25 countries; 160+ international participants; 1500 exhibitors
- Website: www.excon.in

EXCON (Exhibition on construction equipments) is South Asia's largest trade fair and exhibition of construction equipments. EXCON is held biennially in BIEC, Bangalore. The trade fair provides platform for construction equipment manufacturers, component suppliers, and service providers to showcase their products and services.

EXCON is approved by The Global Association of the Exhibition Industry (UFI). and is organized by the Confederation of Indian Industry (CII).

The 13th edition of the event, EXCON 2025 was held between 9 and 13 December 2025.

== About ==
The event is organized in an area of 300,000+ sq.m. with around 1,400 exhibitors, including more than 350 international participants and 80,000 business visitors.

The event includes product launches, live equipment demos, and high-level conferences by CII, Builders Association of India (BAI), and Indian Construction Equipment Manufacturers' Association (ICEMA).

== History ==
EXCON was incepted in 2000.

== Media gallery ==
EXCON 2025
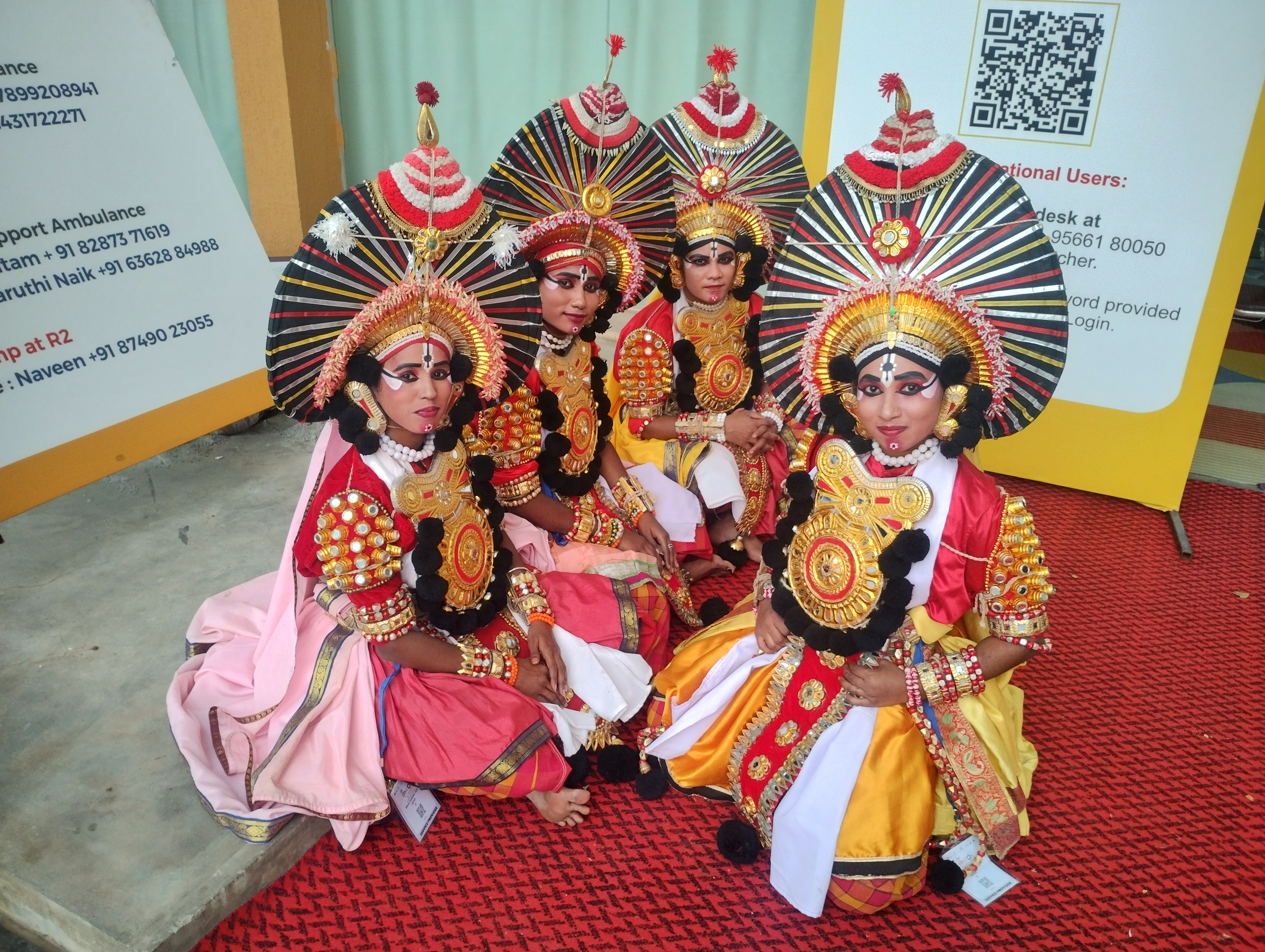
Culture

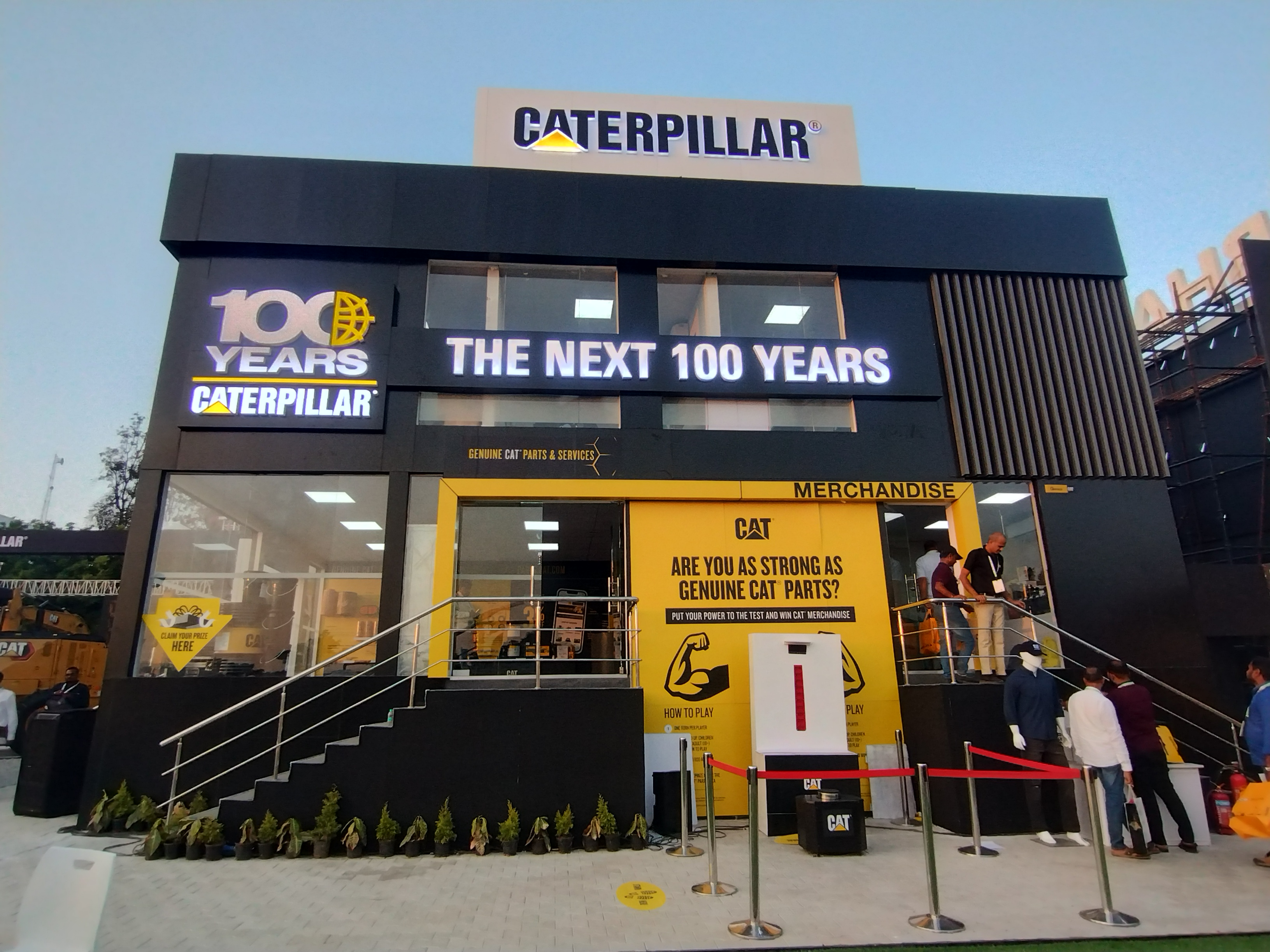
Caterpillar Inc.

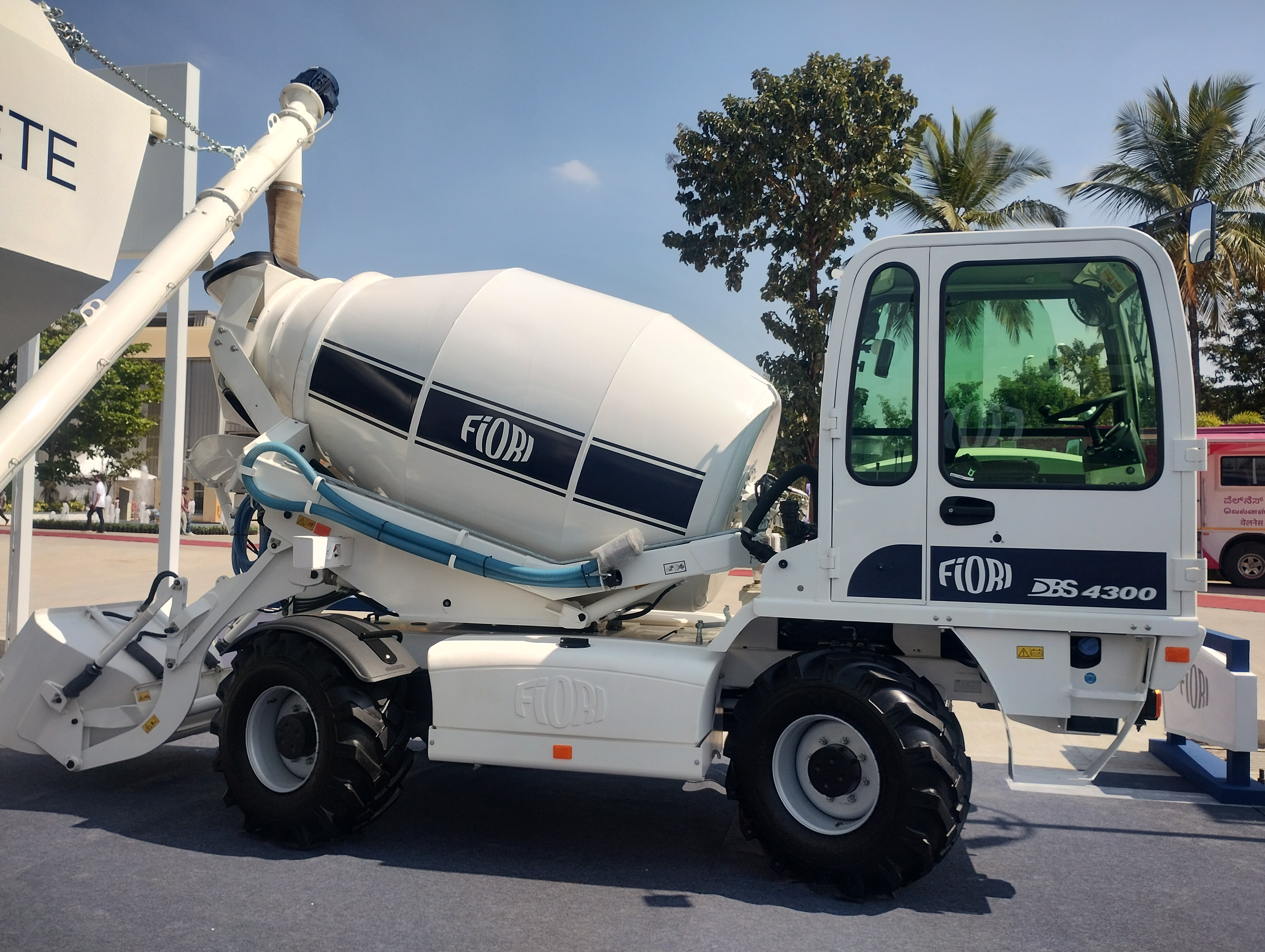
Fiori Group

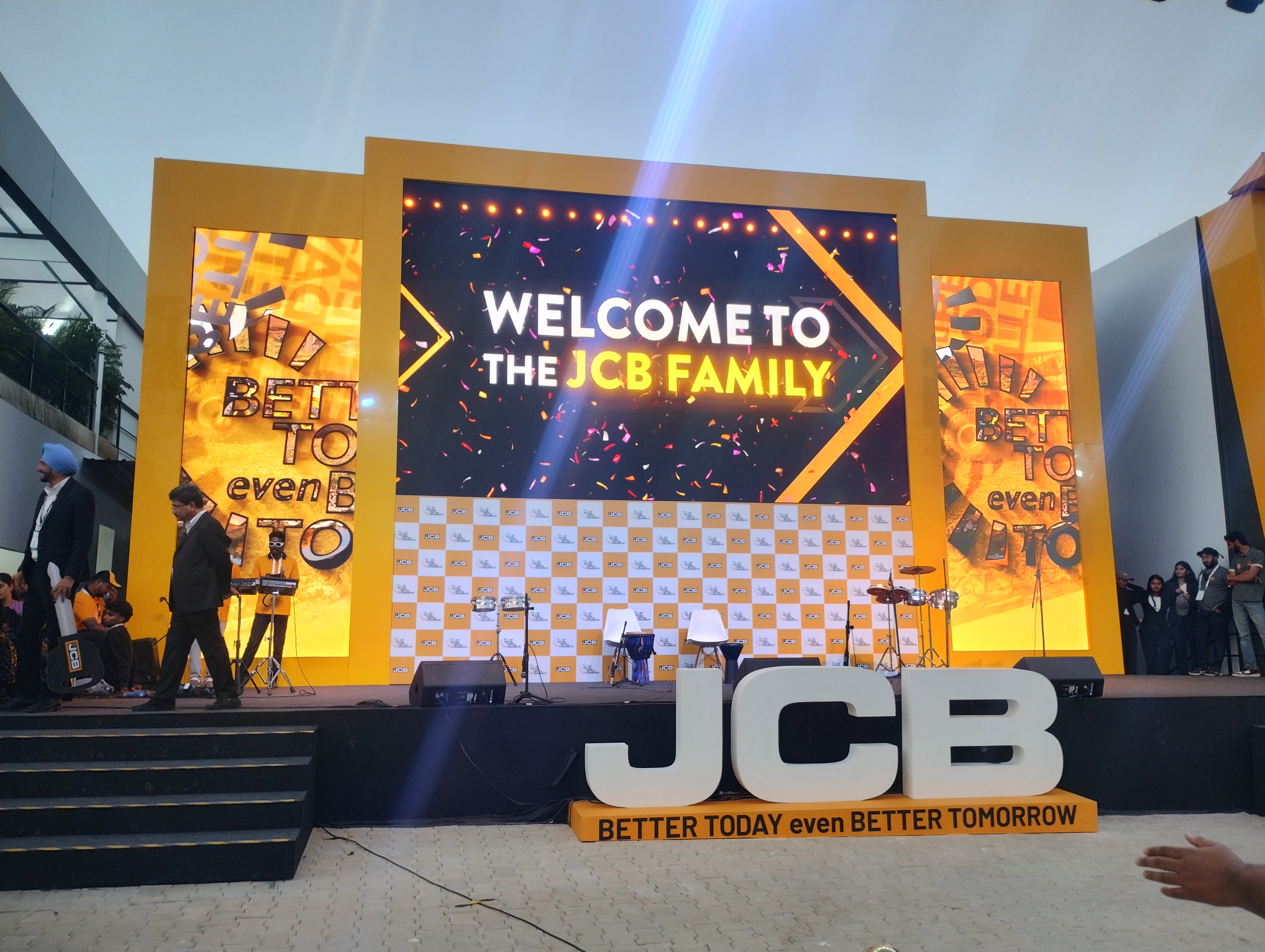
JCB

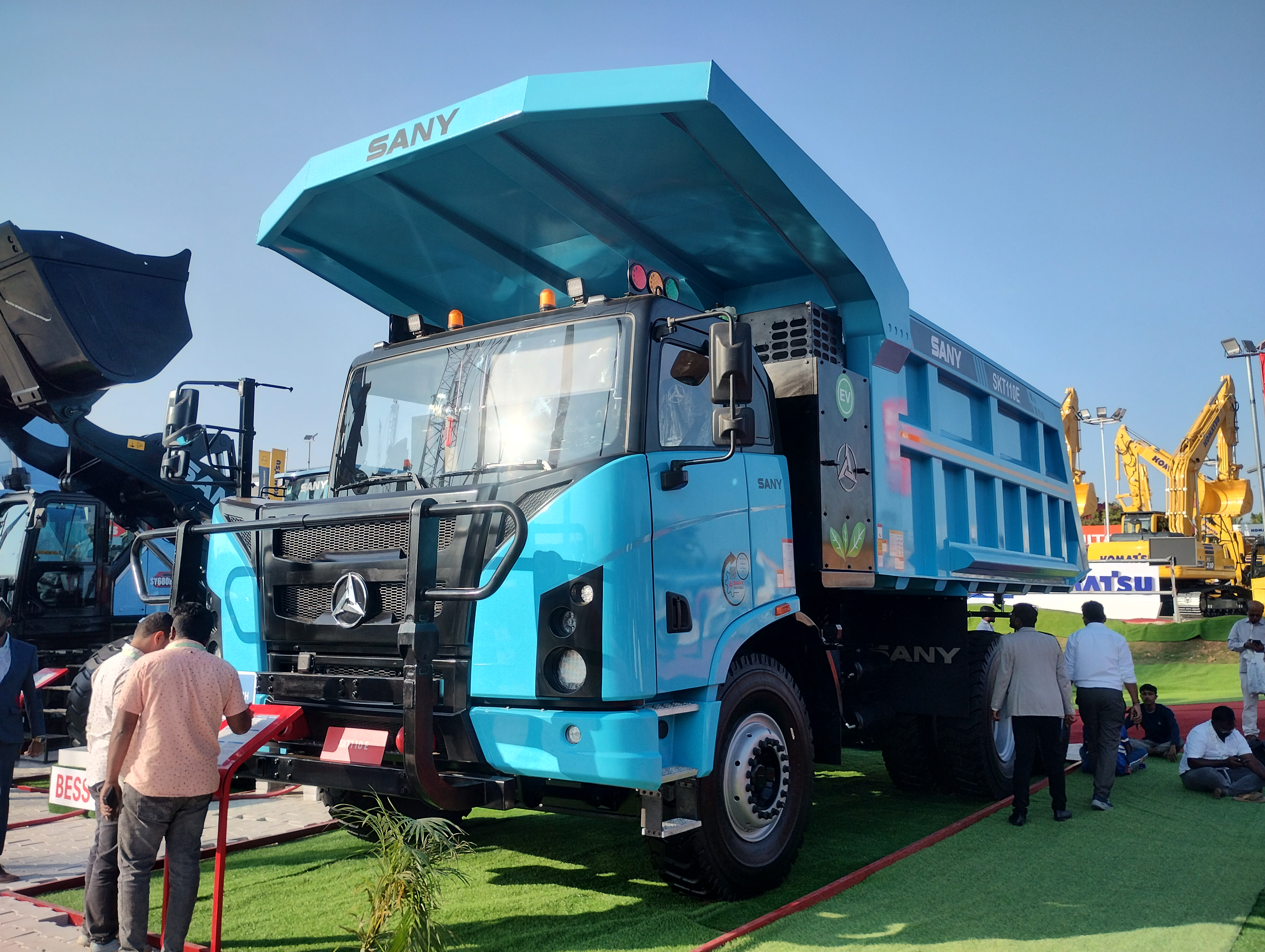
Sany

== See also ==
- IMTEX, South and South-East Asia's largest machine tool and manufacturing show
- Bauma, world's largest trade fair

== External sources ==
- Official website
