= List of members of the House of Representatives of the Netherlands for the Reformed Political Party =

This is a list of all members of the House of Representatives of the Netherlands for the Reformed Political Party (SGP), as well as its parliamentary leaders.

== Members ==
Name	Start	End	Ref.
Hette Abma	31 July 1963	9 June 1981	
Koos van den Berg	3 June 1986	22 May 2002	
Roelof Bisschop	20 September 2012	5 December 2023	
Jan van Bochove	20 November 1945	3 June 1946	
Diederik van Dijk	6 December 2023		
Elbert Dijkgraaf	17 June 2010	10 April 2018	
Cor van Dis sr.	17 September 1929	7 June 1937	
Cor van Dis sr.	4 June 1946	9 May 1971	
André Flach	6 December 2023		
Gerrit Hendrik Kersten	25 July 1922	13 September 1945	
David Kodde	6 November 1956	4 June 1963	
David Kodde	18 June 1963	16 September 1963	
Marinus Abraham Mieras	13 June 1961	4 June 1963	
Marinus Abraham Mieras	29 October 1963	21 February 1967	
Henk van Rossum	1 March 1967	2 June 1986	
Kees van der Staaij	19 May 1998	5 December 2023	
Chris Stoffer	11 April 2018		
Bas van der Vlies	10 June 1981	16 June 2010	
Pieter Zandt	15 September 1925	3 March 1961	

== Parliamentary leaders ==
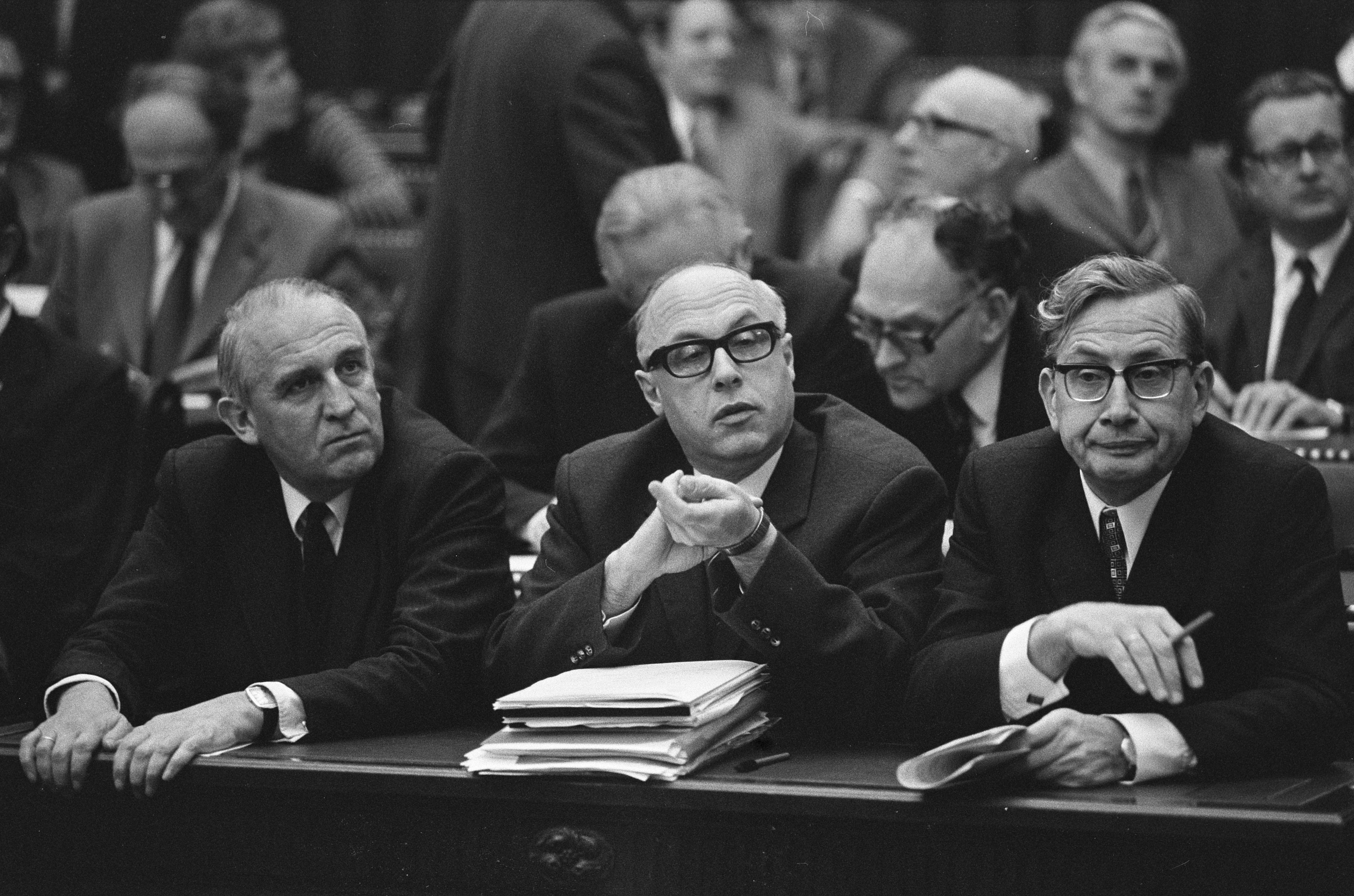
Henk van Rossum (parliamentary leader 1981–1986), Cor van Dis Sr. (parliamentary leader 1961–1971) and Hette Abma (parliamentary leader 1971–1981) in the House of Representatives in 1973.

Name	Start	End	Ref.
Gerrit Hendrik Kersten	25 July 1922	13 September 1945	
Pieter Zandt	18 September 1945	3 March 1961	
Cor van Dis sr.	7 March 1961	27 April 1971	
Hette Abma	29 April 1971	23 May 1981	
Henk van Rossum	27 May 1981	20 May 1986	
Bas van der Vlies	22 May 1986	9 May 2010	
Kees van der Staaij	9 June 2010	4 September 2023	
Chris Stoffer	5 September 2023		
