= List of members of the Senate of the Netherlands for the Reformed Political Party =

This is a list of all members of the Senate of the Netherlands for Reformed Political Party (SGP).

== Members ==
| Name | Start | End | Ref. |
|---|---|---|---|
| Hette Abma | 10 June 1981 | 2 June 1986 | |
| Driekus Barendregt | 13 September 1983 | 12 June 1995 | |
| Gert van den Berg | 13 June 1995 | 6 June 2011 | |
| Diederik van Dijk | 9 June 2015 | 5 December 2023 | |
| Cor van Dis sr. | 11 May 1971 | 4 January 1973 | |
| Herman Fokker | 27 October 1959 | 19 September 1960 | |
| Gerrit Holdijk | 3 June 1986 | 22 June 1987 | |
| Gerrit Holdijk | 11 June 1991 | 8 June 2015 | |
| Koert Meuleman | 13 February 1973 | 9 June 1981 | |
| Peter Schalk | 9 June 2015 | | |
| Cornelis Smits | 6 November 1956 | 20 September 1959 | |
| Marc de Vries | 12 December 2023 | | |

== Parliamentary leaders ==
| Name | Start | End | Ref. |
|---|---|---|---|
| Cornelis Smits | 6 November 1956 | 20 September 1959 | |
| Herman Fokker | 27 October 1959 | 19 September 1960 | |
| Cor van Dis sr. | 11 May 1971 | 4 January 1973 | |
| Koert Meuleman | 13 February 1973 | 9 June 1981 | |
| Hette Abma | 10 June 1981 | 26 May 1986 | |
| Driekus Barendregt | 27 May 1986 | 12 June 1995 | |
| Gerrit Holdijk | 8 June 1995 | 8 June 2015 | |
| Peter Schalk | 9 June 2015 | | |
