= List of candidates in the 1981 Dutch general election =

Prior to the 1981 Dutch general election, contesting parties put forward party lists.

== 1: Labour Party ==
Candidate list for the Labour Party
Position	Candidate	Votes	Result
1	Joop den Uyl	2,334,834	
2-31	Regional candidates		
Total			

== 5: Reformed Political Party ==
Candidate list for the Reformed Political Party
Position	Candidate	Votes	Result	Ref.
1	Henk van Rossum	134,284	Elected	
2	Cor van Dis jr.	2,035	Elected	
3	Bas van der Vlies	20,329	Elected	
4	Gerrit Holdijk	10,047		
5	R. van Ommeren	391		
6	P.H.D. van Ree	203		
7	Gert van den Berg	226		
8	Driekus Barendregt	116		
9	P.J. Dorsman	441		
10	Bert Scholten	375		
11	J.H. Wolterink	179		
12	Cor Boender	180		
13	J. Dankers	91		
14	J. Blaauwendraad	91		
15	J. Catsburg	449		
16	C.S.L. Janse	31		
17	W. Bron	49		
18	M. Pronk	328		
19	W.C. Hovius	367		
20	K. van der Plas	137		
21	B. Stolk	58		
22	Rinus Houtman	69		
23	W. Kroon	47		
24	M. Golverdingen	62		
25	Leen van der Waal	46		
26	M.C. Tanis	191		
27	J. Pijl	17		
28	E. Venema	138		
29	S. de Jong	216		
30	W. van der Zwaag	131		

== Source ==
- Kiesraad (14 September 1981). "Proces-verbaal zitting Kiesraad uitslag Tweede Kamerverkiezing 1981" (PDF) (in Dutch). Archived from the original (PDF) on 13 November 2025.
