= List of candidates in the 1982 Dutch general election =

Prior to the 1982 Dutch general election, contesting parties put forward party lists.

== 7: Reformed Political Party ==
Candidate list for the Reformed Political Party
Number	Candidate	Votes	Result
1	Henk van Rossum	146,074	Elected
2	Cor van Dis	1,460	Elected
3	Bas van der Vlies	3,221	Elected
4	Gerrit Holdijk	930	
5	R. van Ommeren	253	
6	P.H.D. van Ree	190	
7	Gert van den Berg	256	
8	Driekus Barendregt	177	
9	Bert Scholten	754	
10	J.H. Wolterink	208	
11	Cor Boender	159	
12	J. Dankers	112	
13	J. Blaauwendraad	102	
14	J. Catsburg	624	
15	C.S.L. Janse	18	
16	W. Bron	114	
17	M. Pronk	507	
18	W.C. Hovius	294	
19	K. van der Plas	119	
20	B. Stolk	64	
21	Rinus Houtman	63	
22	W. Kroon	38	
23	M. Golverdingen	79	
24	Leen van der Waal	50	
25	M.C. Tanis	151	
26	J. Pijl	25	
27	E. Venema	179	
28	S. de Jong	233	
29	W. van der Zwaag	73	
30	W. Nagtegaal	106	

== Source ==
- Kiesraad (14 September 1982). "Proces-verbaal zitting Kiesraad uitslag Tweede Kamerverkiezing 1982" (PDF) (in Dutch).
