= List of party chairs of the Reformed Political Party =

This is a list of party chairs of the Dutch political party Reformed Political Party (SGP).

== List ==
Name	Start	End	Ref.
Gerrit Hendrik Kersten	24 April 1918	7 March 1946	
Pieter Zandt	7 March 1946	4 March 1961	
David Kodde (Note: Interim)	6 April 1961	13 September 1961	
Hette Abma	13 September 1961	23 February 1985	
D. Slagboom (Note: Interim until 28 May 1986.)	23 February 1985	1 October 1992	
W. Chr. Hovius (Note: Interim until 30 July 1993.)	1 October 1992	2 October 1993	
Dirk Jan Budding (Note: Interim until 27 May 1994.)	2 October 1993	28 February 2004	
Wim Kolijn	1 January 2001	19 March 2011	
Maarten van Leeuwen	19 March 2011	12 September 2018	
Peter Zevenbergen	12 September 2018	9 November 2019	
Maarten van Leeuwen	9 November 2019	16 January 2021	
Dick van Meeuwen	16 January 2021		
