= Leader of the Reformed Political Party =

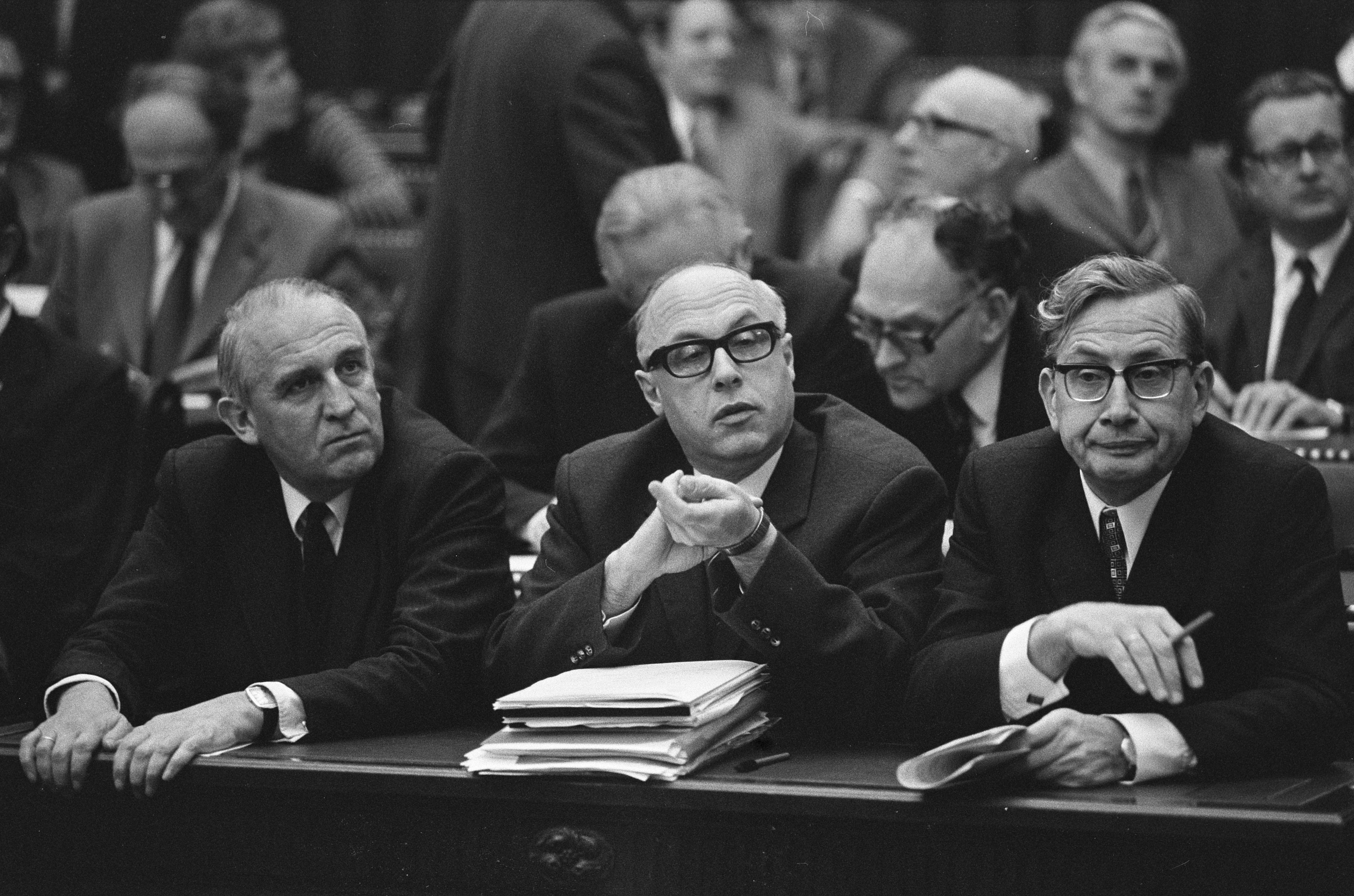
Henk van Rossum (party leader 1981–1986), Cor van Dis Sr. (party leader 1961–1971) and Hette Abma (party leader 1971–1981) in the House of Representatives in 1973.

The Leader of the Reformed Political Party is the most senior politician within the Reformed Political Party (Dutch: Staatkundig Gereformeerde Partij, SGP) in the Netherlands. The post is currently held by Chris Stoffer, who succeeded Kees van der Staaij in 2023.

== History ==
The leaders outwardly act as the 'figurehead' and the main representative of the party. Within the party, they must ensure political consensus. At election time the leader is always the lead candidate of the party list. In the Reformed Political Party the leader has also been the parliamentary leader in the House of Representatives since it was first elected in 1922.

Leader		Term of office	Age as leader	Position(s)	Religion	Lead candidate
Gerrit Hendrik Kersten	Gerrit Hendrik; Kersten (1882–1948)	24 April 1918 – 14 September 1945 (27 years, 143 days)^{[Retired]}	35–63	Member of the House of Representatives (1922–1945); Parliamentary leader in the House of Representatives (1922–1945)	Reformed; Congregations	1922; 1925; 1929; 1933; 1937
Pieter Zandt	Pieter Zandt (1880–1961)	14 September 1945 – 4 March 1961 (15 years, 171 days)^{[Died]}	65–80	Member of the House of Representatives (1925–1961); Member of the Provincial council of South Holland (1931–1941, 1946–1961); Parliamentary leader in the House of Representatives (1945–1961); Member of the Municipal council of Delft (1945–1946, 1946–1961)	Reformed; Church (Reformed; Association)	1946; 1948; 1952; 1956; 1959
^{[Vacant]} (4 March 1961 – 7 March 1961)
Cor van Dis Sr.	Cor van Dis Sr. (1893–1973)	7 March 1961 – 28 April 1971 (10 years, 52 days)^{[Retired]}	67–77	Member of the House of Representatives (1929–1937, 1946–1971); Member of the Municipal council of Ermelo (1946–1949); Member of the Provincial council of Gelderland (1949); Parliamentary leader in the House of Representatives (1961–1971); Member of the Provincial council of South Holland (1961–1970); Member of the Senate (1971–1973); Parliamentary leader in the Senate (1971–1973)	Christian; Reformed; Churches	1963; 1967
Hette Abma	Hette Abma (1917–1992)	28 April 1971 – 26 May 1981 (10 years, 28 days)^{[Retired]}	54–64	Member of the House of Representatives (1963–1981); Member of the Municipal council of Gouda (1966–1970); Parliamentary leader in the House of Representatives (1971–1981); Member of the Senate (1981–1986); Parliamentary leader in the Senate (1981–1986); Member of the Municipal council of Putten (1982–1987)	Reformed; Church (Reformed; Association)	1971; 1972; 1977
Henk van Rossum	Henk van Rossum (1919–2017)	26 May 1981 – 22 May 1986 (4 years, 361 days)^{[Retired]}	61–66	Member of the House of Representatives (1967–1986); Parliamentary leader in the House of Representatives (1981–1986)	Reformed; Congregations	1981; 1982
Bas van der Vlies	Bas van der Vlies (1942–2021)	22 May 1986 – 27 March 2010 (23 years, 309 days)^{[Retired]}	43–67	Member of the Provincial council of Utrecht (1974–1982); Member of the House of Representatives (1981–2010); Parliamentary leader in the House of Representatives (1986–1986)	Restored; Reformed; Church	1986; 1989; 1994; 1998; 2002; 2003; 2006
Kees van der Staaij	Kees van der Staaij (born 1968)	27 March 2010 – 25 August 2023 (13 years, 59 days)^{[Retired]}	41–54	Member of the House of Representatives (1998–2023); Parliamentary leader in the House of Representatives (2010–2023); Member of the Council of State (since 2024)	Old-Reformed; Congregations	2010; 2012; 2017; 2021
Chris Stoffer	Chris Stoffer (born 1974)	25 August 2023 – Incumbent (1 year, 354 days)	48–50	Member of the Municipal council of Nunspeet (2002–2018); Member of the Water board of Veluwe (2009–2012); Member of the House of Representatives (since 2018); Parliamentary leader in the House of Representatives (since 2023)	Reformed; Congregations	2023; 2025
