= George van Heukelom =

Dutch politician (1949–2023)

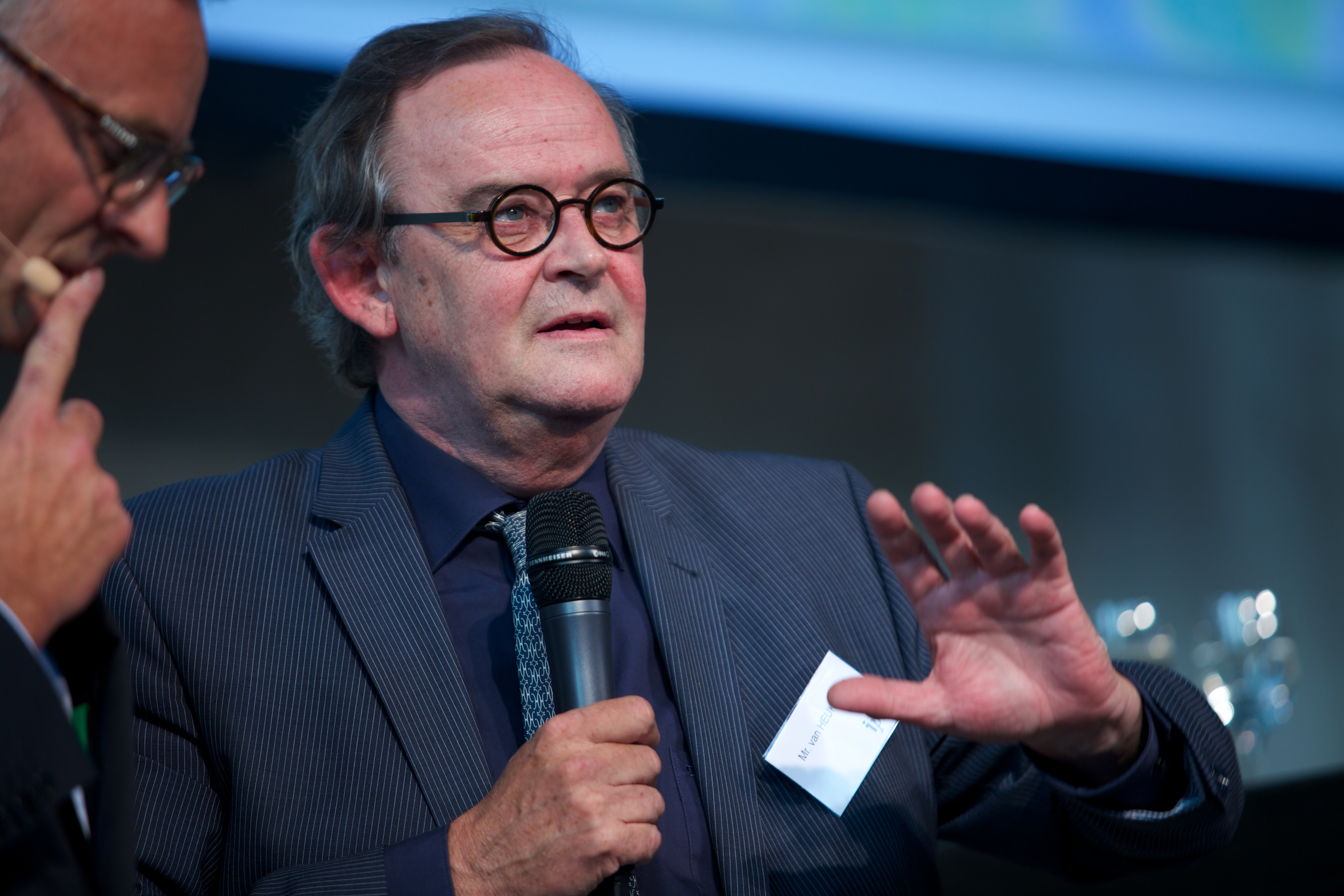
- Van Heukelom in 2014

Member of the Provincial Executive of Zeeland
- In office 2003–2015

Member of the Provincial Council of Zeeland
- In office 1987–2003

Member of the Provincial Council of Zeeland
- In office 1986–1991
- Preceded by: Gert van den Berg
- Succeeded by: Hans Tanis

Personal details
- Born: 9 August 1949
- Died: 14 April 2023 (aged 73)
- Political party: Reformed Political Party

George Richard Johannes van Heukelom (9 August 1949 – 14 April 2023) was a Dutch politician, academic administrator, and member of the Reformed Political Party (SGP). During his early career, he was President of the Reformed Political Party Youth, the youth wing of the SGP, from 1986 until 1991. He then served as a member of the Provincial Council of the province of Zeeland from 1987 to 2003 and the Provincial Executive of Zeeland (the province's executive branch) from 2003 until 2015.

A resident of the village of Nieuwerkerk, George van Heukelom died on 14 April 2023, at the age of 73.
