= Lilian Janse =

Dutch politician

Lilian Janse (2014)

Lilian E.J. Janse-van der Weele (born in 1973) is a Dutch local politician of the Reformed Political Party (SGP).

== Early life and politics ==
Born in Vlissingen, she graduated with a meao diploma. Her father, Cees van der Weele, was a member of the Vlissingen Municipal Council, representing a local alliance of the SGP. Janse has described how she followed her father's work and helped him type out his hand-written debate contributions.

Janse participated in the 2014 municipal election in Vlissingen, becoming the first female candidate of the SGP. The Reformed Political Party did not allow women to run for office until an order by the European Court of Human Rights in 2012. She was elected and became a member of the municipal council on 27 March 2014. She has served as her party's parliamentary leader in Vlissingen. Alongside, she worked successively as a newspaper delivery person and an automobile loader for cargo ships. Following a work accident, she transitioned to an administrative role at a debt assistance agency.

In 2024, the Vlissingen chapter of the SGP nominated Janse to be included on the party list in the next general election, scheduled for 29 October 2025. The local chapter also proposed to remove an article from the SGP's foundational principles document that states that women's suffrage and political participation are in conflict with a woman's calling. Janse expressed support for the initiative. At the SGP's party conference in May 2025, the initiative to allow women to stand as members of parliament failed in a vote of party members.

== Personal life ==
Janse is married to Ko Janse, a paint sprayer, and they have three children.
