= Reformed Political Party Youth =

Dutch youth political organisation

Reformed Political Party Youth Staatkundig Gereformeerde Partij-jongeren
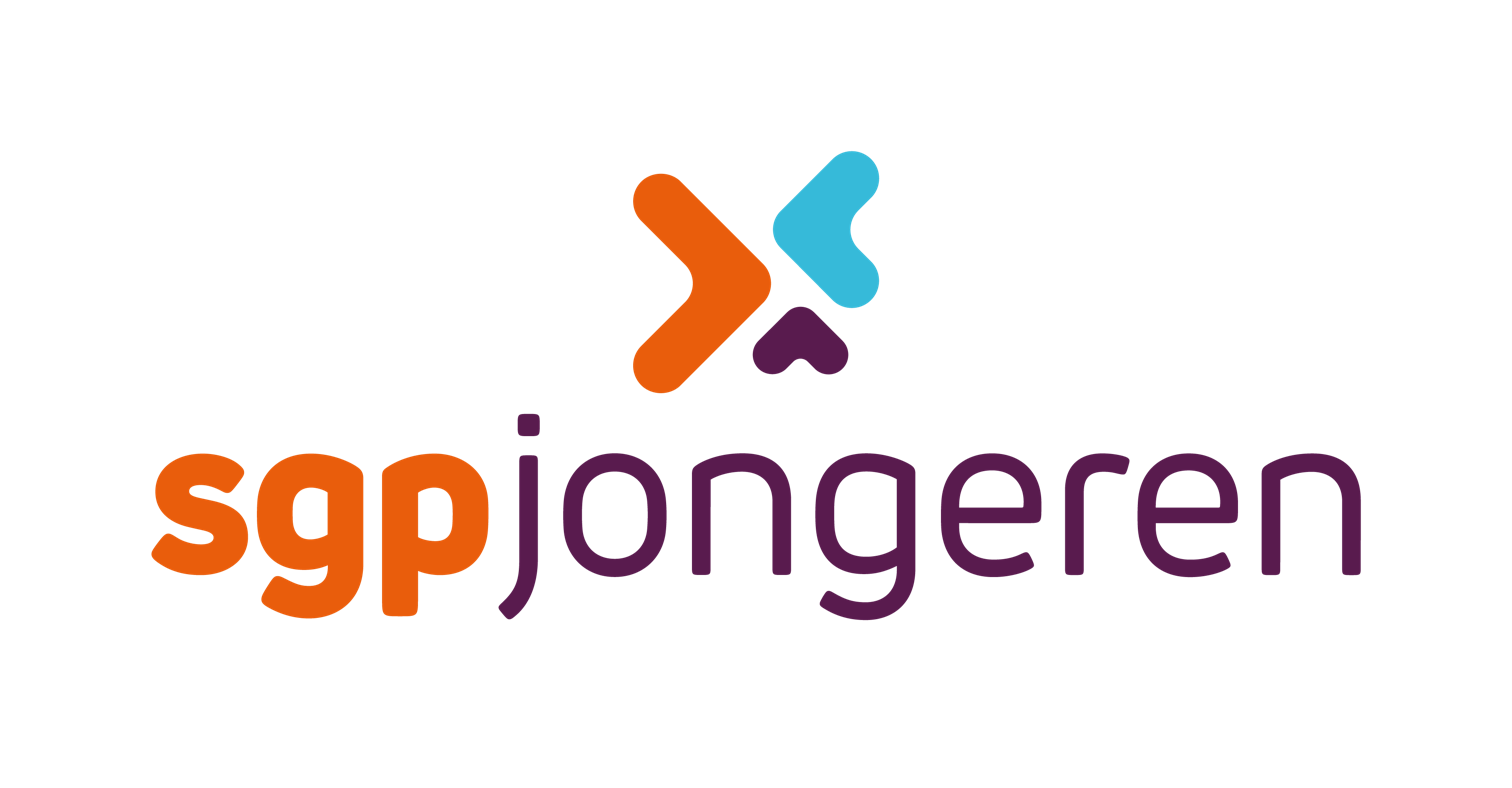
- Chairperson: Johan Roodnat
- Founded: 24 January 1934
- Headquarters: Dinkel 7 3068 HB; Rotterdam
- Ideology: Calvinism
- Mother party: Reformed Political Party (SGP)
- Website: www.sgpj.nl

The Reformed Political Party Youth (Dutch: Staatkundig Gereformeerde Partij-jongeren), officially abbreviated as SGPJ or SGP-jongeren, is the youth wing of the Dutch Reformed Political Party, an Calvinist political party.

The SGPJ is officially independent and established as Landelijk Verband van Staatkundig Gereformeerde Studieverenigingen (LVSGS) in 1934 in Rotterdam and is with over 12,000 members in 2011 the largest political youth organization of the Netherlands.

In 1987, women were allowed to become members and in 2007 a woman was elected for the first time to the board.

== Magazines ==
The SGPJ publishes two magazines:

- Klik, SGP Jeugdblad ('Click, SGP youth magazine') for under sixteen youth
- In Contact, SGP Jongerenblad ('In Contact, SGP youth magazine')

== Chairpersons ==
Chairpersons of the SGPJ:

1. D. Bogaard (1934–1938)
2. C. Meijer (1938–1946)
3. J.C. Hooykaas (1946–1947)
4. Pieter Jan Dorsman (1947–1971)
5. Gert van den Berg (1972–1986)
6. George van Heukelom (1986–1991)
7. Hans Tanis (1991–1999)
8. Elbert Dijkgraaf (1999–2003)
9. Christian van Bemmel (2003–2006)
10. Jan Kloosterman (2006–2009)
11. Jacques Rozendaal (2009–2013)
12. Jan–Willem Kranendonk (2013–2016)
13. Willem Pos (2016–2019)
14. Arie Rijneveld (2019–2021)
15. Leander Tramper (2021–2021)
16. Rody van Heijst (2021–2024)
17. Jelmer Kruidenier (2024)
18. Johan Roodnat (2024–present)
