= Cor van Dis Sr. =

Dutch politician (1893-1973)

Cor van Dis sr.
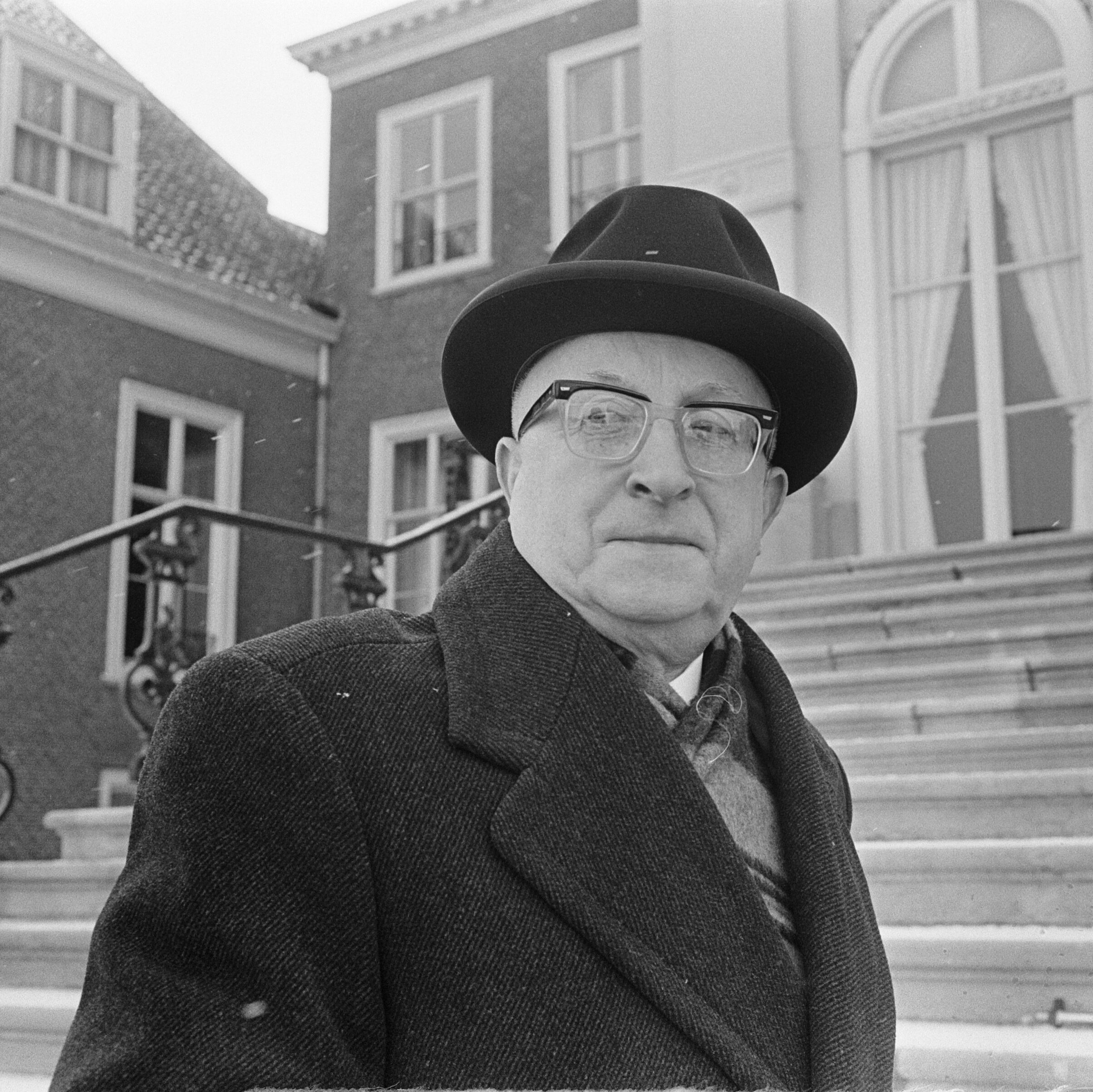
- Cor van Dis Sr. in 1965

Member of the House of Representatives
- In office 17 September 1929 – 8 June 1937
- In office 4 June 1946 – 10 May 1971

Member of the Senate
- In office 11 May 1971 – 5 January 1973

Leader of the Reformed Political Party
- In office 7 March 1961 – 28 April 1971
- Preceded by: Pieter Zandt
- Succeeded by: Hette Abma

Personal details
- Born: Cornelis Nicolaas van Dis; 23 August 1893 Leiden, Netherlands
- Died: 5 January 1973 (aged 79) The Hague, Netherlands
- Party: SGP
- Spouse(s): Hermina Berendina Eikendal (m. 1919; died 1932) Antoinette Betsy Cornelia Polsbroek (m. 1948)
- Children: 7, including Cor van Dis Jr.
- Education: Delft University of Technology

Cornelis Nicolaas "Cor" van Dis (23 August 1893 – 5 January 1973) was a Dutch chemist and politician. He was a member of the Dutch House of Representatives for the Reformed Political Party (SGP) from 1929 to 1937 and from 1946 to 1971, leading the SGP from 1961 to 1971.

== Early life ==
Cor van Dis Sr. was born on 23 August 1893 in Leiden to Pieter van Dis, a grocer who died when Cor was 12 years old, and Sara Maria Bink, as the youngest of seven children. After completing his secondary education, Van Dis, along with his mother and sister, moved to Delft to attend college, graduating from the Technische Hogeschool (today known as the Delft University of Technology) in chemical engineering in 1919. He found employment as a chemist at a factory in Utrecht, where he worked until 1929.

According to Van Dis, he had undergone significant religious transitions during this period, having been an adherent to the Reformed Churches in the Netherlands at age 16, losing his faith at age 21 before becoming an orthodox Reformed Protestant at age 23.

== Political career ==
In the 1920s, Van Dis became acquainted with Gerrit Hendrik Kersten, the leader of the Reformed Political Party (SGP), who drew him into the SGP and eventually encouraged him to seek election to the House of Representatives. Van Dis was first elected as an MP following the 1929 Dutch general election. As an MP, he was the SGP's spokesperson on finance and economic affairs, social affairs, defence, and foreign affairs. After the SGP lost its third seat in the House of Representatives in the 1937 Dutch general election, Van Dis left office. During World War II, Van Dis survived the May 1940 German bombing of Rotterdam in the cellar of a hospital, after which he and his family moved to Ermelo in July 1940, finding work as a representative of a pharmaceutical factory in 1943.

Following World War II, Van Dis reentered the House of Representatives in 1946. After the death of Pieter Zandt in 1961, Van Dis succeeded him as leader of the SGP. Politically, Van Dis was strongly conservative, opposing women's suffrage, lotteries, cremation, sports, and the United Nations on orthodox Calvinist grounds. As Dutch society grew increasingly liberal during the 1960s, Van Dis continued publicly condemning homosexuality, obscene television and modern literature and abortion, all of which he viewed as a manifestation of "unbound freedom", serving as a "cloak of wickedness". In 1971 Van Dis left the House of Representatives and became a member of the Senate, the first SGP politician to do so, being succeeded as MP by his son Cor van Dis Jr.

In addition to his membership of the House of Representatives, Van Dis also served as a member of the municipal councils of Rotterdam from 1931 to 1940 and of Ermelo from 1946 to 1949, as well as of the Gelderland provincial council from January to September 1949 and the South Holland provincial council from 1961 to 1970.

=== Donkey trial ===
Van Dis became best known for suing writer Gerard Reve in 1966 for 'mocking blasphemy', a lawsuit which became known as the Donkey Trial. In the book Nader tot U, the author had the protagonist have sexual intercourse with a God incarnated as a donkey. Ultimately, the Supreme Court of the Netherlands ruled in 1968 that the complaint was inadmissible. According to the judge, passages in Reve's work were indeed blasphemous, but they did not have a mocking character.

In response, Van Dis was also sued by a teacher for "a loveless, and mocking blasphemous manner of speaking". In an interview with Bibeb in Vrij Nederland in December 1965, he had stated that homosexuals cannot believe in God and will go to hell, where "they will chew their tongues in pain in the company of the devil, separated from God". Van Dis was not prosecuted for this by the Public Prosecution Service. He later stated that he was dissatisfied with the interview, because he had been tempted to make remarks about matters he preferred not to speak about.

=== Death ===
Cor van Dis Sr. died on 5 January 1973 in The Hague of stomach flu.

== Personal life ==
Van Dis married Hermina Berendina Eikendal on 14 May 1919, they had 7 children together, including later SGP MP Cor van Dis Jr. After her death from cancer in 1932, he remarried to Antoinette Betsy Cornelia Polsbroek, a French teacher from Suriname, on 27 May 1948.
