= Herman Fokker =

Dutch engineer and politician

Herman Fokker (10 March 1921, Leiden – 23 August 2001, Capelle aan den IJssel) was a Dutch engineer and politician. As a member of the Reformed Political Party (SGP) he was a member of the Senate from 1959 to 1960. He was also a SGP member of the municipal council of Rhenen from 1978 to 1990.
