= Diplomatic mission of the Netherlands to the Holy See =

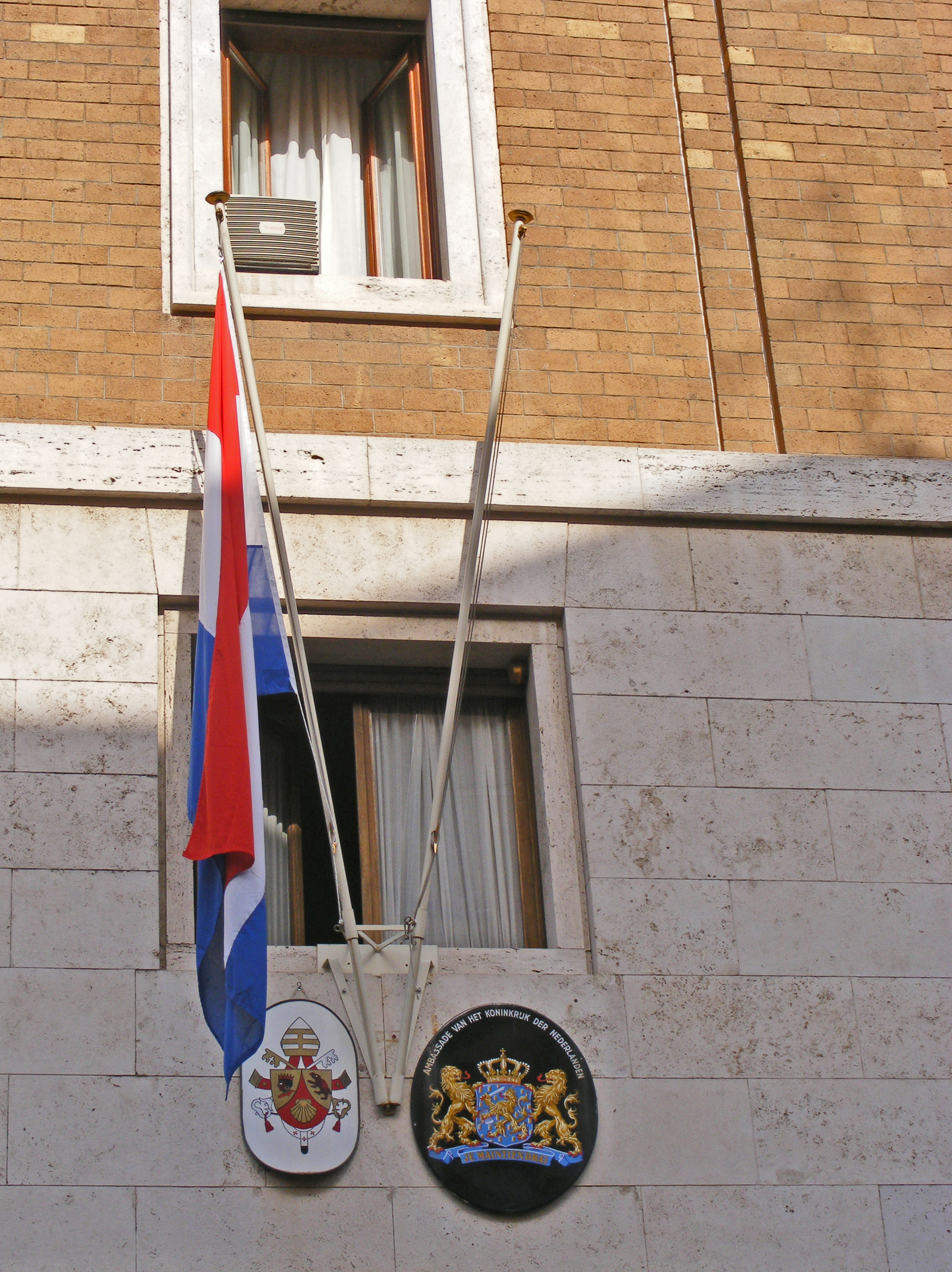
- Address: Via Michele Mercati 6, Rome
- Ambassador: Annemieke Ruigrok

The Kingdom of the Netherlands has had a diplomatic representation at the Holy See since 1944. Previously this was the case from 1814 to 1871 and from 1918 to 1925. Initially this was in the form of a legation, but this was converted to ambassador in 1967.

The diplomatic mission to the Holy See was a contested issue, which even led to the fall of the cabinet in 1925 after the Night of Kersten.

== History ==
The mission was established in 1814, just after the emergence of the Netherlands as an independent unitary state. After the Capture of Rome and the unification of Italy in 1870, the Papal States and territorial power of the Pope came to an end. This was a reason for the liberal Member of Parliament Gerard Dumbar to submit an amendment in 1871 to delete the item from the budget. The amendment was adopted with 39 votes in favor and 33 votes against. The recall followed in early 1872. It contributed to alienation between the liberals and the Catholics, who had worked together until then.

During the First World War, a lot of diplomacy took place in the Vatican between warring countries. In 1915, the liberal Cort van der Linden cabinet decided to temporarily reestablish the embassy as a 'listening post' for the neutral Netherlands. In 1920 it was converted from temporary to permanent legation. In 1925, the leader of the Reformed Political Party (SGP) Gerrit Hendrik Kersten submitted an amendment to abolish the legation. This was supported by opposition parties and the Protestant ruling party Christian-Historical Union (CHU). The so-called Night of Kersten led to the fall of the first Colijn cabinet and the abolition of the legation in 1926.

At the beginning of the Second World War, representation became relevant again. The Americans already insisted on this in 1940. During the war, however, this proved difficult for the Dutch government-in-exile, partly because they did not know how the Protestant part of the population would react to this. Queen Wilhelmina, who was not enthusiastic about the embassy anyway, was particularly concerned about this. Minister of Foreign Affairs Eelco van Kleffens even briefly threatened to resign if it was not instituted. Ultimately, Wilhelmina agreed and the embassy was established in 1944.

Since then, CHU, SGP and Democrats 66 (D66) have tried at various times to abolish the post, but without success.

== List of representatives ==
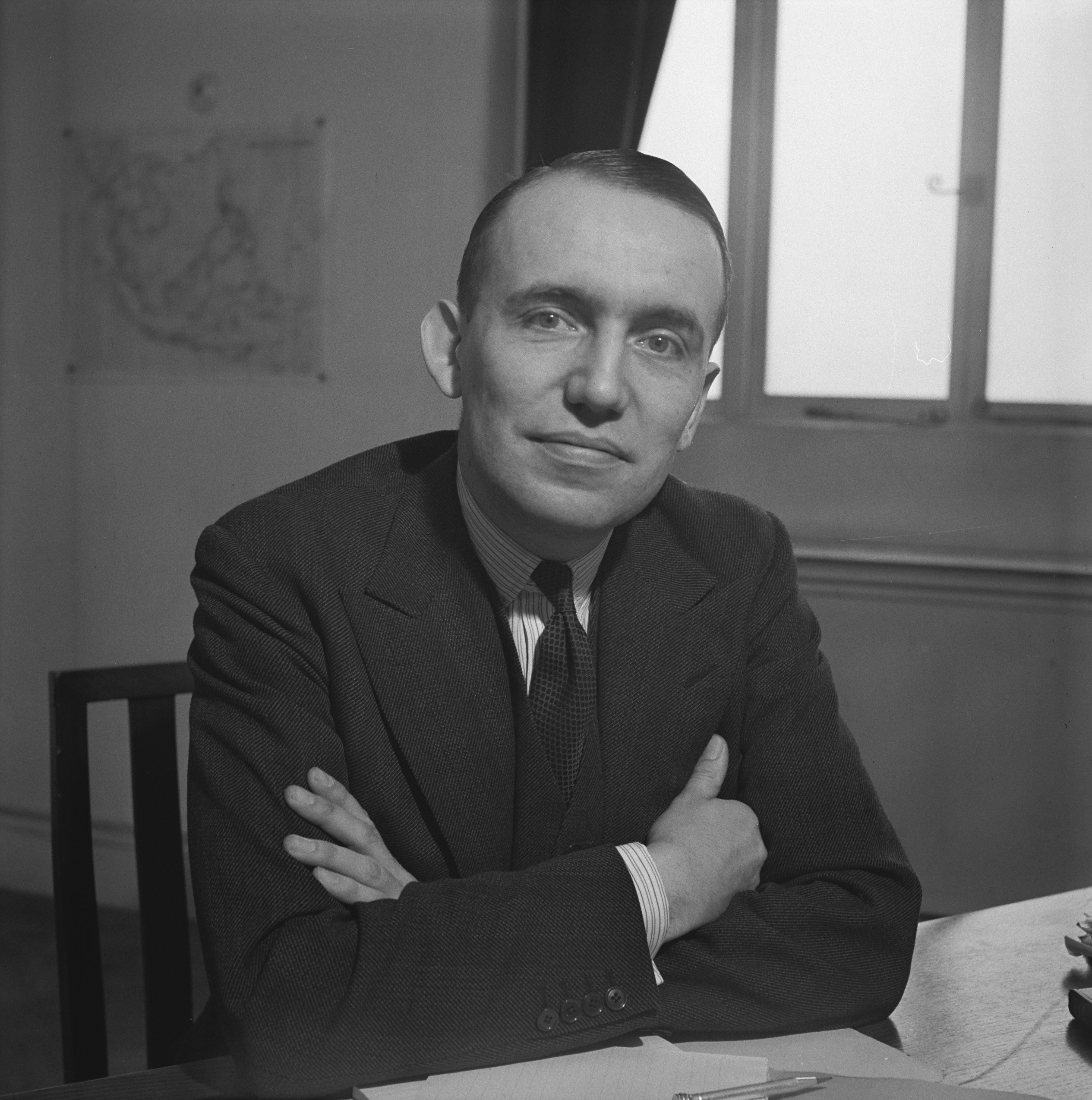
S.G.M. baron van Voorst tot Voorst in 1942

- Octaaf van Nispen tot Sevenaer (1915–1926)
- M.W. van Weede (1944–1954)
- F.R.W.H.M.J. graaf de Marchant d'Ansembourg (1954–1967)
- S.G.M. baron van Voorst tot Voorst (1967–1975)
- J.I.M. Welsing (1975-?)
- J. Ceulen
- Johan Anthony Beelaerts van Blokland (1981–1986)
- S.J.J. baron van Voorst tot Voorst (1986–1991)
- R.H. graaf van Limburg Stirum (1991–?)
- Monique Frank (2005–2009)
- Henriette van Lynden-Leijten (2009–2010)
- Jaime de Bourbon de Parme (2014–2018)
- Caroline Weijers (2018–2022)
- Annemieke Ruigrok (2022–2026)
- Paul Bekkers (2026–present)

== See also ==
- Apostolic Nunciature to the Netherlands
