= Driewegen, Terneuzen =

Driewegen
- Hamlet
- Location in the province of Zeeland in the Netherlands Driewegen (Netherlands)
- Coordinates: 51°20′35″N 3°39′27″E
- Country: Netherlands
- Province: Zeeland
- Municipality: Terneuzen

Area
  - Total: 0.26 km^{2} (0.10 sq mi)

Population (2021)
  - Total: 185
  - Density: 710/km^{2} (1,800/sq mi)
- Time zone: UTC+1 (CET)
  - Summer (DST): UTC+2 (CEST)
- Postal code: 4536
- Dialing code: 0115

Driewegen is a hamlet in the Dutch province of Zeeland. It is a part of the municipality of Terneuzen.

The hamlet was first mentioned between 1838 and 1857 as Driewegen, and means "(intersection of) three roads". Driewegen has place name signs.

== Notable inhabitants ==
- Wim Kolijn (1944-2015), politician
