= Wim Kolijn =

Dutch politician

Wim Kolijn (12 January 1944 – 2 December 2015) was a Dutch politician of the Reformed Political Party (SGP).

Kolijn was born in Driewegen, Terneuzen. He was SGP chairman between 2000 and 2011. He also was the leader of the SGP Fraction of the Provincial States of Zeeland, of which he was member for 21 years. He was a citizen of the city of Terneuzen and served on its municipal council for twelve years.

Kolijn was trained as a mechanical engineer and worked at the company Dow Chemical from 1966 to 2005.

He became a member of the church council of the Reformed Congregations in the Netherlands to Terneuzen in 2008. In 2010, he also became an elder.

Kolijn died at the age of 71 in Terneuzen on 2 December 2015.
