= Diederik van Dijk =

Dutch politician (born 1971)

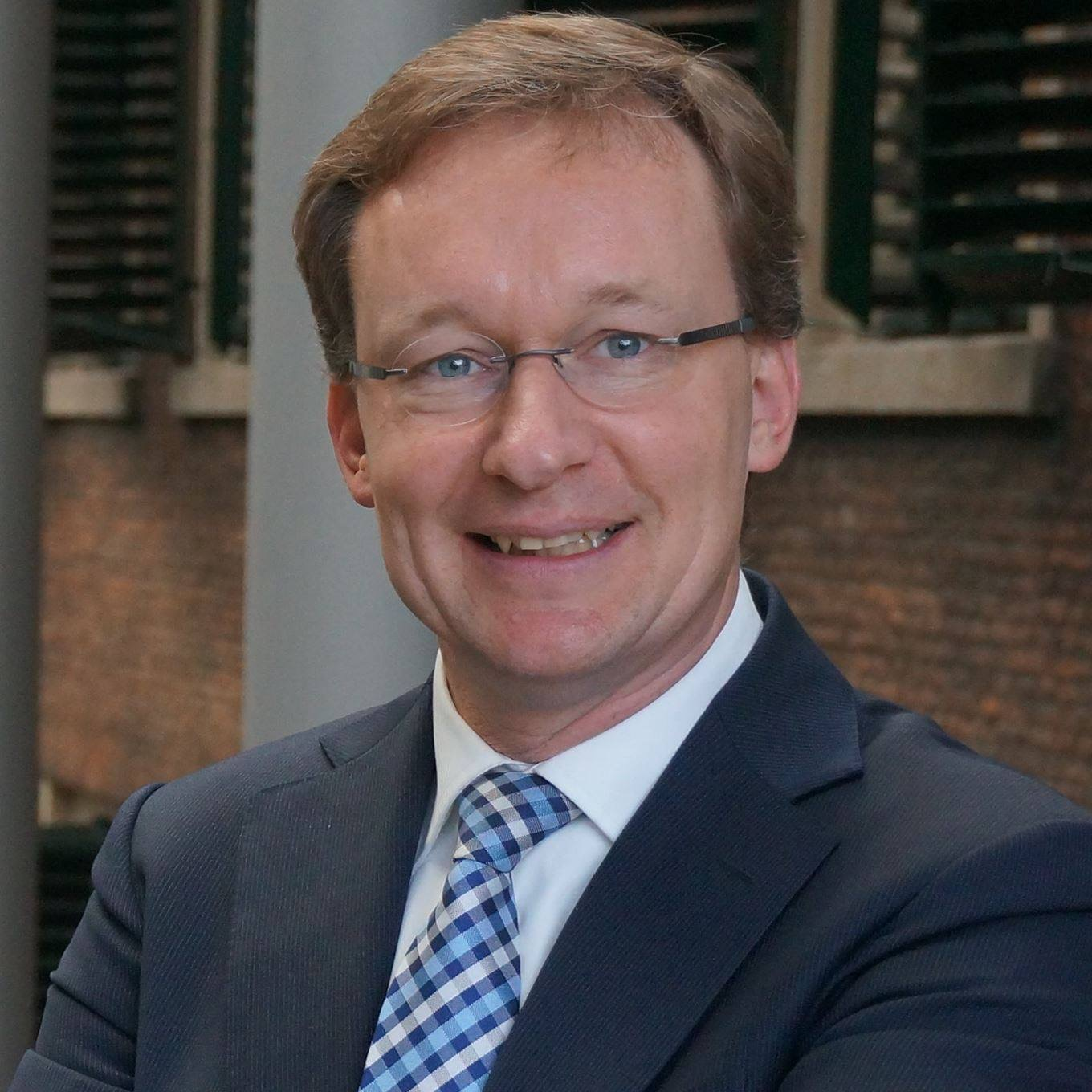

Member of the House of Representatives
- Incumbent
- Assumed office 6 December 2023

Member of the Senate
- In office 9 June 2015 – 5 December 2023

Personal details
- Born: Dirk Jacob Huibert van Dijk; 22 November 1971 (age 54) Driebergen-Rijsenburg, Netherlands
- Party: Reformed Political Party
- Children: 5
- Education: Utrecht University (LLM, law)
- Occupation: Politician, director, columnist

Dirk Jacob Huibert "Diederik" van Dijk (born 22 November 1971) is a Dutch non-executive director and politician of the Reformed Political Party (SGP). He has served in the Senate from 2015 to 2023 and in the House of Representatives since 2023.

== Biography ==
Van Dijk studied law at Utrecht University. Starting in 1996, he has been a policy assistant to the Reformed Political Party fraction in the House of Representatives, dealing with foreign affairs, defense, European affairs, infrastructure and environment. While a member of the body in 2024, a motion of Van Dijk was carried calling on the Dutch Health Council to investigate the appropriateness of the policy regarding gender-affirming care for transgender minors. Minister Conny Helder had advised against the motion, saying that periodic evaluations were already occurring, while Van Dijk raised concerns about safety and effectivity. Later in the year, he signed a declaration against surrogacy.

In the past, he was among others chair of the Reformed Political Party election committee in The Hague, a member of the board of directors of the Reformed teachers' college Driestar Hogeschool at Gouda, and an elder as well as chair of the diaconate in the Dutch Reformed Bethlehemkerk at The Hague. Nowadays he is among others a member of the supervisory board of the Reformed news media company Erdee Media Groep as well as of the care facilities Sorg and Lelie Zorggroep, and an elder in the Restored Reformed Church at Waddinxveen.

=== House committee assignments ===
- Committee for Justice and Security
- Temporary committee Fundamental rights and constitutional review
- Committee for Health, Welfare and Sport
- Committee for European Affairs
- Committee for Defence
- Committee for Asylum and Migration

== Personal life ==
Diederik van Dijk is married with five children, and he lives in Benthuizen. His hobbies include water skiing and motorcycling.

== Electoral history ==
Electoral history of Diederik van Dijk
| Year | Body | Party | Pos. | Votes | Result | | Ref. |
| Year | Body | Party | Pos. | Votes | Party seats | Individual | Ref. |
|---|---|---|---|---|---|---|---|
| 2002 | House of Representatives | Reformed Political Party | 6 | 518 | 2 | Lost | |
| 2003 | House of Representatives | Reformed Political Party | 6 | 343 | 2 | Lost | |
| 2006 | House of Representatives | Reformed Political Party | 6 | 237 | 2 | Lost | |
| 2010 | House of Representatives | Reformed Political Party | 6 | 238 | 2 | Lost | |
| 2012 | House of Representatives | Reformed Political Party | 6 | 243 | 3 | Lost | |
| 2021 | House of Representatives | Reformed Political Party | 5 | 722 | 3 | Lost | |
| 2023 | House of Representatives | Reformed Political Party | 2 | 5,776 | 3 | Won | |
| 2025 | House of Representatives | Reformed Political Party | 2 | 4,932 | 3 | Won | |
