= Peter Schalk =

Dutch politician (born 1961)

Leader of the Reformed Political Party in the Senate
- Incumbent
- Assumed office 9 June 2015
- Preceded by: Gerrit Holdijk

Member of the Senate
- Incumbent
- Assumed office 9 June 2015

Personal details
- Born: 7 June 1961 (age 65) Haarlemmermeer, Netherlands
- Party: Reformed Political Party
- Children: 5
- Education: Driestar Hogeschool (B.Ed)
- Occupation: Politician, director, educator

Peter Schalk (born 7 June 1961) is a Dutch non-executive director and also a politician of the Reformed Political Party (SGP). Since 9 June 2015, he has been a member of the Senate, and also Senate group leader.

Schalk studied at the Reformed teachers' college Driestar Hogeschool in Gouda, and subsequently worked as an educator. Nowadays he is a member of the board of directors of the reformed Reformatorisch Maatschappelijke Unie.

Peter Schalk is married, has five children and lives in Veenendaal. He is a member of the Reformed Congregations.
