= Hette Abma =

Dutch politician (1917–1992)

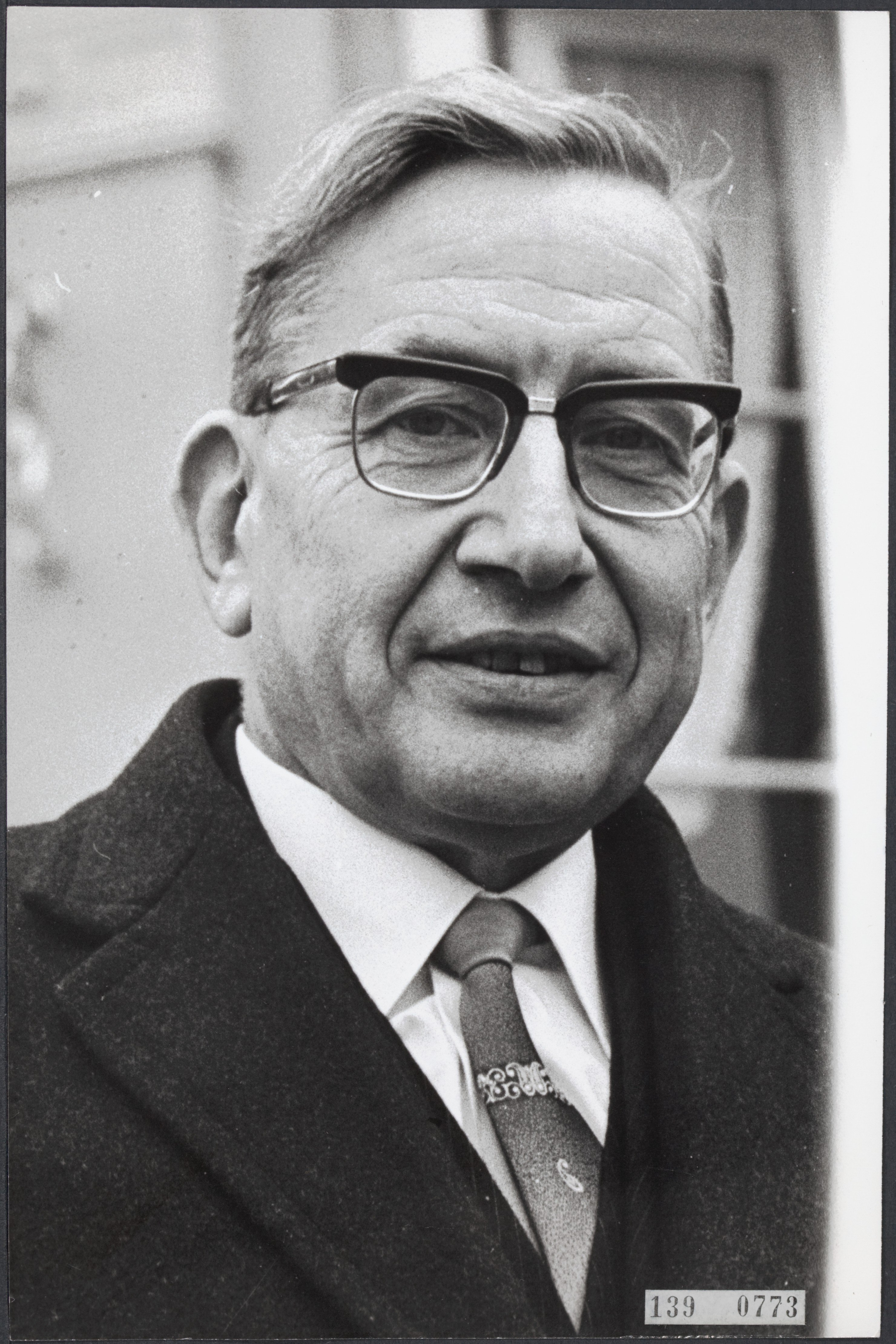
- Hette Abma in 1972

Member of the House of Representatives
- In office 31 July 1963 – 10 June 1981

Member of the Senate
- In office 10 June 1981 – 3 June 1986

Leader of the Reformed Political Party
- In office 1971–1981
- Preceded by: Cor van Dis Sr.
- Succeeded by: Henk van Rossum

Personal details
- Born: Hette Gerrit Abma; 27 January 1917 Wouterswoude
- Died: 2 January 1992 (aged 74) Putten
- Party: SGP
- Other political affiliations: Gereformeerde Gezindte Putten (from 1985)
- Spouse: Johanna Hendrina Leenmans (m. 1941)
- Children: 4
- Education: Utrecht University

Hette Gerrit Abma (23 January 1917 – 2 January 1992) was a Dutch Reformed minister and politician who was a member of the House of Representatives from 1963 to 1981 and the Senate from 1981 to 1986 for the Reformed Political Party (SGP). He was the SGP's parliamentary leader from 1971 to 1981, succeeding Cor van Dis sr..

== Early life ==
Hette Abma was born on 23 January 1917 in Wouterswoude into a Frisian family which belonged to the Dutch Reformed Church, and which traditionally supported the Christian Historical Union. His father was a teacher, and moved around the Netherlands working at various schools. After finishing his secondary education at the Christelijk Lyceum in Arnhem in 1937, he went on to study theology at Utrecht University, graduating in 1940 and being ordained as a minister in the Dutch Reformed Church the next year.

He first became a minister in the Frisian town of Driezum, moving to a parish in IJsselstein in 1944 and Rotterdam between 1948 and 1955. In the late 1940s, he started becoming politically active in the SGP, likely influenced by the family of his wife Johanna, whose father Hendrik Arie Leenmans was part of the party's leadership. While serving as a minister in the town of Monster from 1955 to 1959, he became acquainted with Pieter Zandt, at that time the leader of the SGP. Zandt recommended him to become a member of the party leadership in 1956, and in 1961 he became the SGP's chairman.

== Political career ==
Abma was first elected to the House of Representatives in the 1963 general election, and was made parliamentary leader in 1971. Because of his desire to remain a minister in Putten, where he had worked since 1959, he got into a conflict with the Dutch Reformed Church, which saw the two functions as incompatible. This was only resolved years later with Abma being granted the status minister-emeritus, allowing him to continue to preach, which he would continue to do weekly throughout his political career.

In parliament, he sought to present a more pragmatic face for the SGP, working together with like-minded figures in the Reformed Political League (GPV) and the Reformatory Political Federation (RPF) to oppose issues such as abortion or euthanasia. This was met with severe opposition from more conservative SGP members, who united in the Committee of Objectors in 1969, which reorganised into the National Foundation for Protection for Upholding Reformed State Principles in 1977, accusing Abma of being a "blasphemer" and an "enemy of God's people". Outside of the SGP, his constructive attitude and his calm and collected preacher-like speeches in the House of Representatives garnered Abma much goodwill. In 1981, he left the House due to his advanced age and became a member of the Senate, in which he would serve until 1986.

== Ideology ==
During Abma's leadership of the SGP, the party adopted a more moderate and practically oriented stance in regard to its religious beliefs. Inspired by the thought of Arnold van Ruler, Abma introduced the term "theocracy" into the SGP, not as a desired form of government, but meaning that the government should serve as "the servant of God", obeying divine commandments as laid out in the Bible but not necessarily incompatible with democracy as long as the public does not infringe upon God's sovereignty. While the SGP had always seen the state as an instrument to "advance the kingdom of Jesus Christ" and protect God's law, under Gerrit Hendrik Kersten and Zandt this had traditionally been interpreted in a militant manner, seeing World War II and the North Sea flood of 1953 as divine punishment. Abma on the other hand sought to present his ideal of "theocracy" less as a condemnation and more a means of promoting a conception of the good life. In contrast to the SGP's reputation as a rigid testimonial party, Abma saw constructive political action as a more effective way of spreading the word of God. This also implied a more tolerant attitude towards non-Christian views in society, without abandoning the party's founding principles. He also sought to soften the party's traditional opposition to women's suffrage, which was officially dropped in 1989, although the party continued to ban women from becoming members or holding office.

In the House, Abma continued to support conservative Christian views in line with the SGP's ideology. For instance, Abma refused to be interviewed on television during his political career due to the party's longstanding opposition to the medium. He strongly opposed abortion, proposing a law along with GPV leader Bart Verbrugh aimed at banning the practice in 1979, which was rejected by a wide margin in a parliamentary vote the next year. He also supported the reintroduction of the death penalty in line with Biblical teachings.

== Later life ==
In 1982 Abma was elected to the municipal council of Putten, where he came into conflict with the local SGP over his policy of pursuing cooperation with the local RPF, leading to him founding an independent local political faction (Gereformeerde Gezindte Putten) in 1985. That same year, he resigned as SGP chairman over conflicts related to the appointment of Bas van der Vlies as party leader.

Abma died on 2 January 1992 in Putten.
