= Reformatorisch Dagblad =

Dutch newspaper

- Type: Daily newspaper
- Format: Compact
- Founded: 1971
- Political alignment: Conservative, Orthodox Protestant
- Headquarters: Apeldoorn
- Circulation: 42,000
- Website: rd.nl

The Reformatorisch Dagblad (Dutch pronunciation: [reːfɔrmaːˈtoːriz ˈdɑɣblɑt]; "Reformed Daily") is a Dutch Protestant newspaper with a circulation of around 60,000, headquartered in Apeldoorn. The conservative newspaper was founded in 1971 and is associated with the Reformed Political Party. It is one of only a handful of daily national papers remaining in the Netherlands.

== Website ==
Reformatorisch Dagblad has had a website since 1997. To honor the day of rest, pages on their website are not available on Sundays. It is closed on Sunday, exactly from midnight to midnight (according to the IP address location). A message is shown that the newspapers would like to see them come back on another day of the week. The news items and many other parts are therefore not available. In January 2012, the website received the domain name rd.nl, which had long been desired by the newspaper, but previously belonged to the Rotterdams Dagblad.

== Circulation ==
Total paid and targeted circulation in accordance to HOI, Instituut for Media Auditing and Jan van de Plasse: Kroniek van de Nederlandse dagblad- en opiniepers, Otto Cramwinckel Uitgever, Amsterdam 2005, ISBN 90-75727-77-1.

- 1975: 31.200
- 1980: 46.200
- 1985: 48.290
- 1990: 52.240
- 1995: 56.540
- 2000: 58.023
- 2003: 57.324
- 2015: 43.528
- 2016: 42.740
- 2017: 41.513
