= Testimonial party =

Type of political party

A testimonial party (Dutch: beginselpartij/getuigenispartij) is a political party that focuses on its principles, instead of adapting them to local or temporal issues in the pursuit of coalition government participation.

== In the Netherlands ==
It is a peculiar phenomenon in the Netherlands, because of the Dutch system of proportional representation, in which any party that has over 0.66% of the vote can enter the House of Representatives; thus the House typically has 10 or more factions represented. With such a large number of parties, it is all but impossible for one single party to win the 76 seats needed for a majority in its own right.

As a result, most Dutch political parties will negotiate and compromise to form a coalition government. Testimonial parties will not compromise; this, combined with the fact that they are usually small parties, makes their participation in a coalition government extremely unlikely. Examples of parties that have referred to themselves as "testimonial" include the orthodox Protestant Reformed Political Party (SGP) and the animal rights-advocating Party for the Animals. In contrast, the term 'program party' is used for parties oriented toward participation in coalitions.

== In other countries ==
- The Christian Heritage Party of New Zealand and the Christian Heritage Party of Canada, many members of which had Dutch ancestry, may have been a version of a 'testimonial party' effectively exported to a foreign context.
- The Communist Party of Greece refuses to join any coalition like in May 2012 or January 2015.
- Many Trotskyist parties, such as the Workers' Party of Uruguay, usually obtain less than 1000 votes in every election.

== See also ==
- Protest party
- Single-issue politics
- Abstentionism
