= Rinus Houtman =

Dutch politician

Rinus Houtman (born 6 December 1942 in Maastricht) is a Dutch politician of the Reformed Political Party (SGP). He was mayor of Nieuw-Lekkerland from 2007 to 2012, and has been mayor of Leerdam since 2013.
