= Bibeb =

Dutch journalist (1914–2010)

Bibeb in 1987

Bibeb, pseudonym of Elisabeth Maria Lampe-Soutberg (June 15, 1914 – January 18, 2010) was a Dutch journalist known for conducting more than 600 in-depth interviews with public figures including Picasso, M. C. Escher, and Andy Warhol over her long-spanning career, becoming a fixture of the Vrij Nederland newspaper her extensive career, which spanned from the early 1950s to 1997. Bibeb's exhaustive preparation and in-depth interview practices left a lasting influence on Dutch culture and transformed the written portrait interview.

== Early career ==
Bibeb registered as a journalist in 1931, at age 17, and started her career at De Nieuwe Pers, writing for the outlet Haarlems Dagblad, where she entered a romantic relationship with editor-in-chief Walther Schaper. A year after Schaper accepted a job in Medan, North Sumatra in 1936, Bibeb followed him there. She joined him in working at De Sumatra Post, where she wrote a children's and fashion column. While in Sumatra, she also contributed to the monthly magazine Oké. Bibeb and Schaper were married on June 6, 1937, and had a son, Wouter. During World War II, the family was captured during Japanese occupation of the Dutch East Indies and spent three years in captivity. Bibeb wrote an account of her years spent in the women's camp trying to keep herself and her young son alive, which appears in the collection Den vaderland getrouwe (1962), compiled by Mathieu Smedts.

Following the war, the family returned to the Netherlands, where Shaper was hired as editor-in-chief of De Nieuwe Pers. Bibeb gave birth to a daughter, and worked writing travelogues for Haagsch Dagblad where she began to conduct interviews more frequently, first for De Nieuwe Pers and then for Vrij Nederland. Bibeb and Shaper divorced in 1950, and two years later she later married George Lampe, a painter and director of the Vrije Academie voor Beeldende Kunsten, an art academy in The Hague.

== Interviews ==
Because Bibeb initially wrote for the women's page of Vrij Nederland, her early interviews were exclusively with women. She expanded beyond women in the mid-1950s, and developed her signature style of major, substantive dialogues in which the subject reveals stunningly personal details about themselves. She soon gained such a reputation that you only counted as a Dutch celebrity if you had been interviewed by Bibeb. In addition to her interviews, she wrote the column "Zomaarwatvrouwelijkheid" for Vrij Nederland, in which she summarized foreign magazine articles.

From the early 1950s to 1997, Bibeb published approximately six hundred in-depth interviews in Vrij Nederland with high-profile artists and celebrities, like Brigitte Bardot, Breyten Breytenbach, Truman Capote, Marc Chagall, Juliette Gréco, Federico Fellini, and Marcello Mastroianni, as well as certain political figures including the Israeli military leader Moshe Dayan. Bibeb's interview with then-Dutch minister of defence, Henk Vredeling, in the August 31, 1974 issue was so popular that an additional 26,000 copies of the newspaper were printed.

=== Techniques ===
Bibeb was the first interviewer of her kind, and transformed the practice with her unprecedentedly personal questions about sex, relationships, and emotion. Readers and reviewers frequently wondered how she got such revealing and sensational statements from her interview subjects.In order to coax sensitive statements from these high-profile people, Bibeb approached each interaction with elaborate, labor-intensive techniques. The conversations frequently took place over multiple hours-long sessions at the interviewee's home, or occasionally at Bibeb's own home in Scheveningen, but in some cases they were known to stretch to days on end. Prior to asking questions, she attempted to build a bond with interview subjects by taking them out to dinner or the movies, showing up to their homes multiple times with gifts such as flowers. During conversation, Bibeb would look her interviewee in the eyes, staring intently while writing constant, extensive notes in her illegible script. She prepared meticulously prior to interviews, reading and watching all available material about a person, and had an uncanny memory for details mentioned earlier in the interview.

== Personal life ==
Bibeb did not give interviews about herself, and her public persona remained mysterious, in part because of an agreement with her editor Rinus Ferdinandusse that allowed her to reveal almost nothing. Following the death of her husband George Lampe in 1982, Bibeb withdrew from public life, slowly becoming more isolated and despondent for nearly 30 years, until her death on January 18, 2010, at age 95. She lived in a nursing home during her final years.

She returned bouquets of flowers from interviewees and declined invitations to dinners and drinks. From her interviewees, we know that she lived in a 'witch's cottage' filled with shells, pebbles, and art on the walls, that she wore extravagant clothing, and that she was interested in astrology.

Her vague statements about her age led some to believe she was born in 1922. She died on January 18, 2010, at the age of 95. Following her death there was doubt about her actual surname, with some reports claiming it was actually "Santberg" (not "Soutberg"). A week after her death Vrij Nederland reported that despite the claims, Bibeb's birth name was indeed "Soutberg".

== Legacy ==
She acquired nicknames such as "the mother of all interviewers", the "Greta Garbo of Dutch journalism" and the "queen of the interview" (or the "inventor" or "grandmaster" of the portrait interview). She won the Lucas Ooms Prize in 1975 and the Victorine Hefting Prize in 1997. In 2008, Bibeb was honored with De Tegel, an annual Dutch journalism prize awarded by the Dutch Association of Journalists, RTL Nederland, and several other media organizations. A selection of Bibeb's interviews have been collected into twelve books, including Bibeb in Paris (1957), Bibeb and VIPs (1965), andYou Must Follow a Great Passion (1993).
