= Middelbaar economisch en administratief onderwijs =

Explaining a former education type/.qualification (1968-1996) in the Netherlands

Middelbaar Economisch en Administratief Onderwijs or M.E.A.O. is a former type of further trade education providing vocational instruction and training in economic and administrative subjects, preparing students for office and trade jobs (secretary, administrator, accounts assistant, etc.) or higher business education. Education generally took two to four years, although some courses establishments offered accelerated programmes enabling students to obtain the qualification in one year.

The name MEAO was introduced in the Dutch education system through the education act ("Mammoth Law") of 1963 (which took effect in 1968), and was abolished in 1996 after the education law reforms of 1995, when the education type was integrated into Middelbaar Beroepsonderwijs (MBO).

== Business economics (CE) ==
Business economics was also known as commercial economics (CE) genoemd.

== See also ==
- Education in the Netherlands
