= Chris Stoffer =

Dutch politician (born 1974)

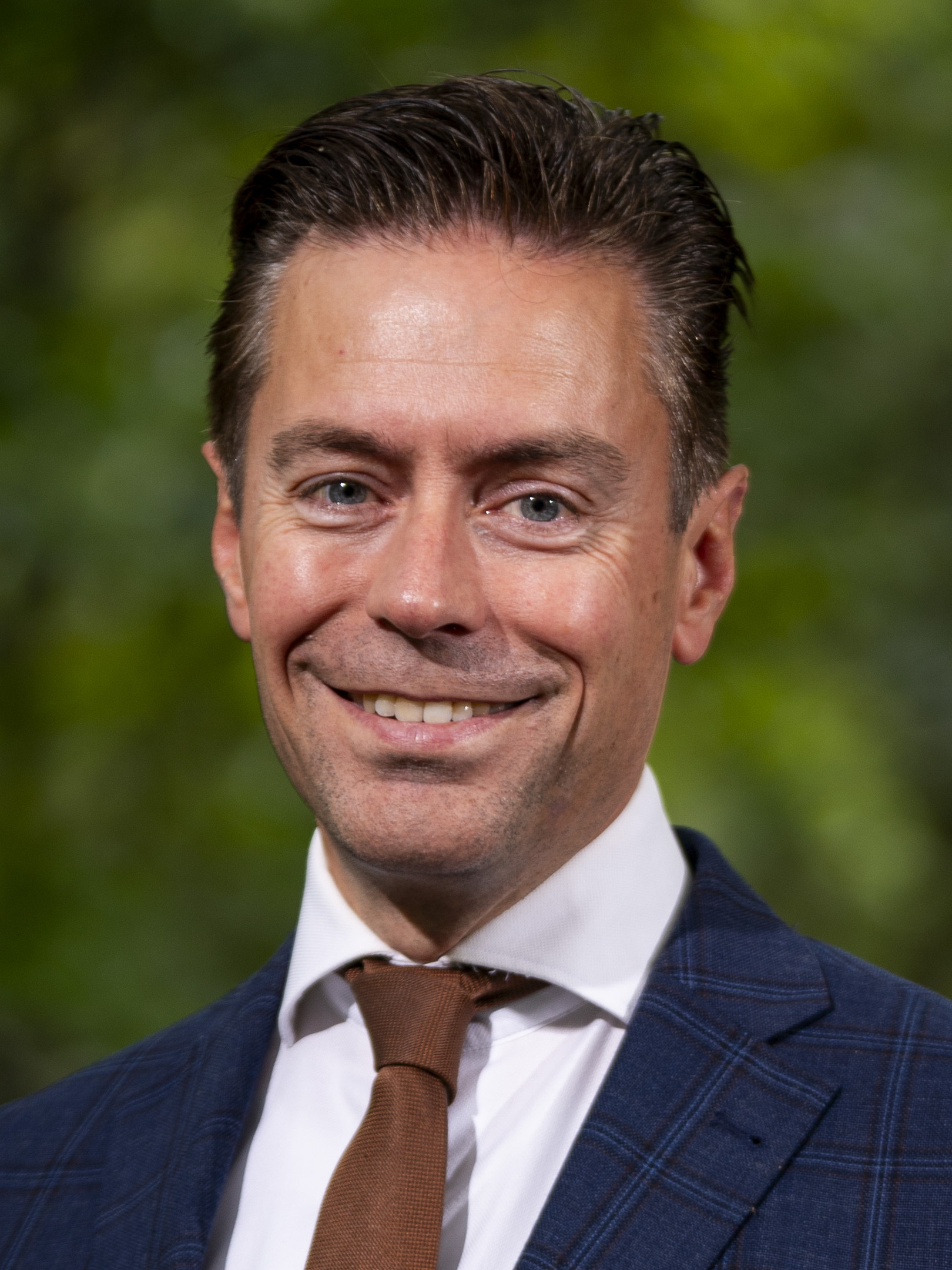
- Stoffer in 2023

Leader of the Reformed Political Party
- Incumbent
- Assumed office 25 August 2023
- Preceded by: Kees van der Staaij

Member of the House of Representatives
- Incumbent
- Assumed office 11 April 2018

Member of the Nunspeet Municipal Council
- In office 14 March 2002 – 31 May 2018

Personal details
- Born: Christiaan Stoffer; 19 September 1974 (age 52) Harderwijk, Netherlands
- Party: SGP (2001–present)
- Children: 3
- Education: University of Twente
- Occupation: Civil engineer; politician

Christiaan "Chris" Stoffer (born 19 September 1974) is a Dutch politician who has served as Leader of the Reformed Political Party (Staatkundig Gereformeerde Partij, SGP) since 25 August 2023.

== Career ==
Prior to his service in the House of Representatives, he was a member of the municipal council of Nunspeet from 2002 to 2018. From 2010 onwards, he led the SGP group in the municipal council. As a civil engineer, Stoffer worked for the Rijkswaterstaat government organisation until 2018, for which he was a project leader and team manager.

Stoffer has been a member of the House of Representatives since 11 April 2018, when he succeeded Elbert Dijkgraaf. After having come party leader on 25 August 2023, he led the party during the 2023 general election.

Nederlands Dagblad described Stoffer's political style as more impulsive than that of his predecessor, Kees van der Staaij, citing Stoffer's organizing of a protest supporting Israel following its Gaza war and a billboard campaign opposing the results of a submarine tender.

At the invitation of ELNET, Stoffer visited Israel at the start of 2024. He said he wanted to show his solidarity with Israel following the October 2023 Hamas-led attack that had sparked the conflict, and he dismissed calls for a ceasefire in the Gaza Strip amongst considerable civilian casualties, saying Hamas infrastructure first had to be destroyed.

Stoffer organized a pro–Israeli protest at Dam Square in Amsterdam in response to pro-Palestinian protests on university campuses.

== Personal life ==
Stoffer is a member of the Reformed Congregations in the Netherlands. At the age of 13, Stoffer's mother died. He is married and has three children.

== Electoral history ==
Electoral history of Chris Stoffer
Year	Body	Party	Pos.	Votes	Result		Ref.
Year	Body	Party	Pos.	Votes	Party seats	Individual	Ref.
2017	House of Representatives	Reformed Political Party	5	926	3	Lost	
2021	House of Representatives	Reformed Political Party	2	4,690	3	Won	
2023	House of Representatives	Reformed Political Party	1	188,755	3	Won	
2025	House of Representatives	Reformed Political Party	1	210,929	3	Won	

Party political offices
Preceded by Kees van der Staaij	Leader of the Reformed Political Party; 2023–present	Incumbent
