= Kees van der Staaij =

Dutch politician (born 1968)

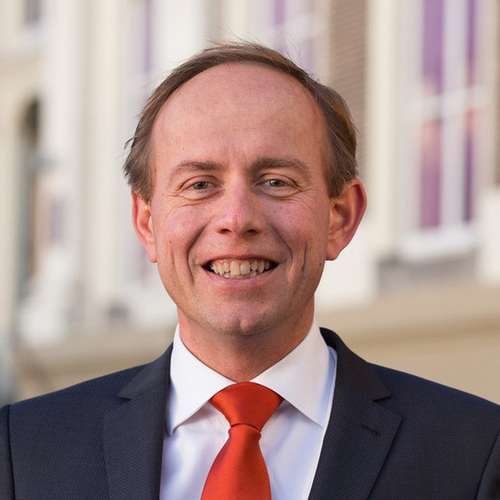

Leader of the Reformed Political Party
- In office 27 March 2010 – 25 August 2023
- Preceded by: Bas van der Vlies
- Succeeded by: Chris Stoffer

Leader of the Reformed Political Party in the House of Representatives
- In office 10 May 2010 – 25 August 2023
- Preceded by: Bas van der Vlies
- Succeeded by: Chris Stoffer

Member of the House of Representatives
- In office 19 May 1998 – 5 December 2023

Personal details
- Born: Cornelis Gerrit van der Staaij; 12 September 1968 (age 58) Vlaardingen, Netherlands
- Party: Reformed Political Party (1986–present)
- Spouse: Marlies van Ree (m. 1994)
- Education: Leiden University (LLM)
- Occupation: Politician; Jurist; civil servant
- Website: (in Dutch) Official website
- Kees van der Staaij introducing himself in English recorded October 2017

Cornelis Gerrit "Kees" van der Staaij (Dutch pronunciation: [ˈkeːs fɑn dər ˈstaːi]; (Note: In isolation, van is pronounced [vɑn] or also [fɑn].) born 12 September 1968) is a Dutch former politician who served as a member of the House of Representatives from 1998 to 2023 and Leader of the Reformed Political Party (Staatkundig Gereformeerde Partij, SGP) between 2010 and 2023. As a parliamentarian, he focused on matters of judiciary, home affairs, Kingdom relations, foreign policy, the European Union, development aid, the defense, public health, welfare, sports, immigration and political asylum. Van der Staaij was the longest-serving member of the House of Representatives from 2017 until 2023.

== Early life ==
Van der Staaij was born in Vlaardingen, a city in the province of South Holland. His father was a civil servant in the municipality of Maartensdijk.

He went to two Reformed primary schools in Vlaardingen (1974–1979) and Geldermalsen (1979–1980) and to a Reformed secondary school in Amersfoort (1980–1986). He studied law at Leiden University, specialising in constitutional and administrative law.

== Politics ==
Van der Staaij was attracted to politics and became a member of the conservative Reformed Christian SGP party in 1986.

After several jobs at the Council of State, he was elected to the House of Representatives in 1998. In 2010 he became party leader as well as parliamentary leader in both cases succeeding Bas van der Vlies. He led his party as lead candidate in the 2010, 2012, 2017 and 2021 general elections.

Van der Staaij announced that he would not seek re-election in November 2023. He succeeded Marja van Bijsterveldt as special envoy for the maritime industry, advising the Minister of Economic Affairs and Climate Policy, in February 2024, and he returned to the Council of State in June 2024 as a state councillor in its advisory division.

== Political positions ==
Van der Staaij was considered one of the most conservative and right-wing political leaders in the Netherlands. He signed the 2017 anti-LGBTQ Nashville Statement and supported anti-abortion organisations, making sure such organisations were granted more subsidies. Before the 2012 general election, when asked whether he agreed with American politician Todd Akin's comments on "legitimate rape" and pregnancy, he said "it is a fact" that women "seldom" become pregnant after being raped, although he added rape is "terrible". He later pointed towards a study he read on the matter, adding: "There may be conflicting studies on this, I will take note of that with respect." He stated that Akin lacked compassion in his comments, but that abortion policy in the Netherlands had gone too far. After his comments, Van der Staaij was briefly placed under police protection. BNR published data related to Van der Staaij's comments, showing that only 7% of women in the Netherlands reported becoming pregnant after a rape. During the campaign he and his party focused on the importance of faith and community in society and advocated for theocracy.

== Personal life ==
Van der Staaij is married and lives in Benthuizen, South Holland. He and his wife adopted two children born in Colombia.

== Decorations ==
Honours
Ribbon bar	Honour	Country	Date	Comment
	Knight of the Order of Orange-Nassau	Netherlands	5 December 2023	

== Electoral history ==
Electoral history of Kees van der Staaij
Year	Body	Party	Pos.	Votes	Result		Ref.
Year	Body	Party	Pos.	Votes	Party seats	Individual	Ref.
1998	House of Representatives	Reformed Political Party	3	2,250	3	Won	
2002	House of Representatives	Reformed Political Party	2	7,107	2	Won	
2003	House of Representatives	Reformed Political Party	2	8,060	2	Won	
2006	House of Representatives	Reformed Political Party	2	5,878	2	Won	
2010	House of Representatives	Reformed Political Party	1	152,493	2	Won	
2012	House of Representatives	Reformed Political Party	1	182,189	3	Won	
2017	House of Representatives	Reformed Political Party	1	196,205	3	Won	
2021	House of Representatives	Reformed Political Party	1	193,605	3	Won	
2024	European Parliament	Reformed Political Party	39 (Note: Van der Staaij participated as lijstduwer.)	9,276	1	Lost	

== Notes ==
Party political offices
Preceded by Bas van der Vlies	Leader of the Reformed Political Party; 2010–2023	Succeeded by Chris Stoffer
Preceded by Bas van der Vlies	Leader of the Reformed Political Party in the House of Representatives; 2010–2023	Succeeded by Chris Stoffer
