= Gerrit Holdijk =

Dutch jurist and politician

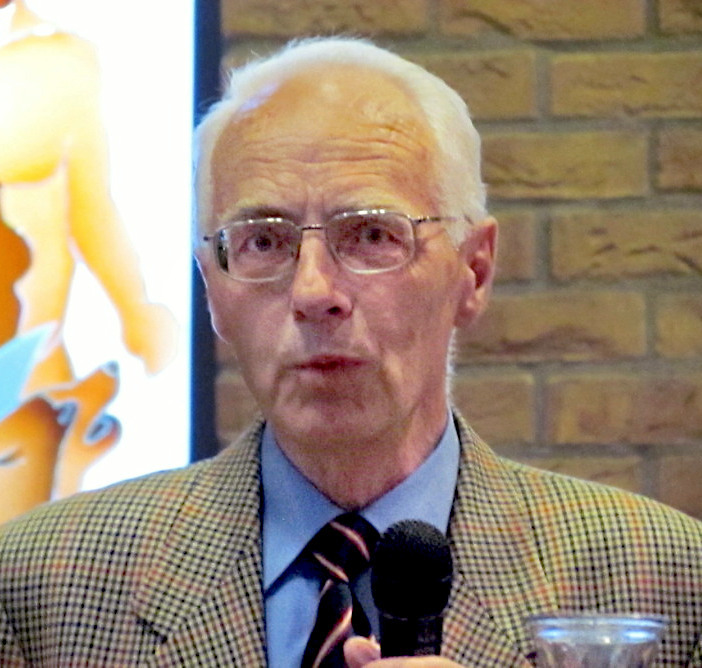
Gerrit Holdijk in 2012

Gerrit Holdijk (17 November 1944 – 30 November 2015) was a Dutch jurist and politician of the Reformed Political Party (SGP).

Holdijk was born in Uddel, a village in the Veluwe region. He studied notary at a post-secondary level, and also law at Utrecht University. Till his retirement at the age of 65 he was performing a judicial practice.

Belonging to the Reformed Association in the Protestant Church in the Netherlands, he was a member of its executive committee since 1983.

On behalf of his party he was a member of the States-Provincial of Gelderland from 1987 to 2011. He was also a member of the Senate from 1986 to 1987 and again from 1991 to 2015. As a senator he was dealing with matters in the field of justice, home affairs and agriculture.

Holdijk was well known for pipe smoking. On 30 November 2015 he died in his hometown of a serious illness at the age of 71.
