= Leen van der Waal =

Dutch politician (1928–2020)

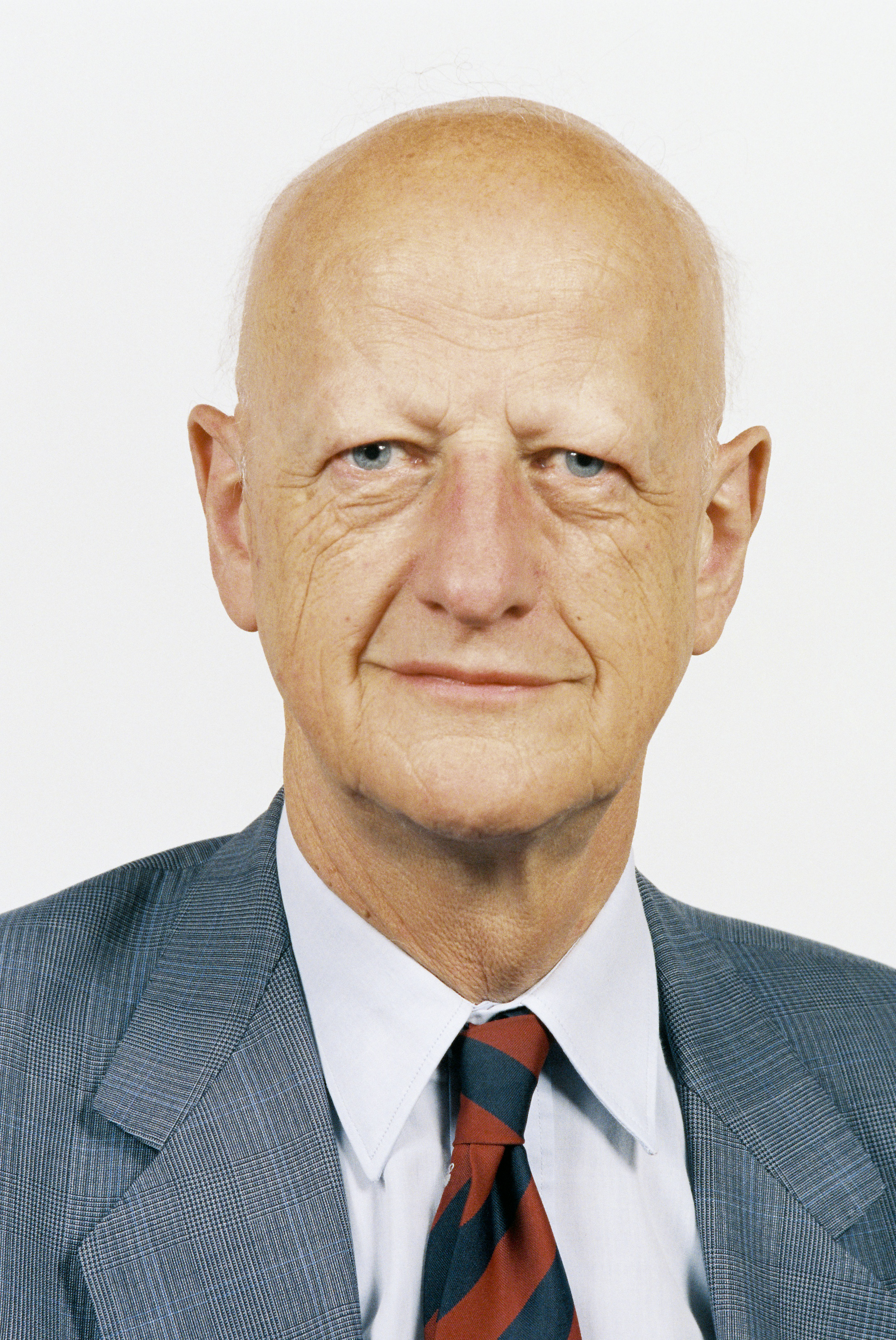

Member of the European Parliament
- In office 1984–1997
- Succeeded by: Rijk van Dam
- Constituency: Netherlands

Personal details
- Born: Leendert van der Waal; 23 September 1928 Ridderkerk, Netherlands
- Died: 10 September 2020 (aged 91)
- Political party: Reformed Political Party (SGP)

Leendert van der Waal (23 September 1928 – 10 September 2020) was a Dutch politician who was a Member of the European Parliament from the Reformed Political Party (SGP).

Van der Waal was born in Ridderkerk, South Holland, and studied mechanical engineering at the Delft University of Technology. In 1984, he was elected to the European Parliament for the combined list of SGP, GPV and RPF, and served until 1997.
