= Henk van Rossum =

Dutch politician

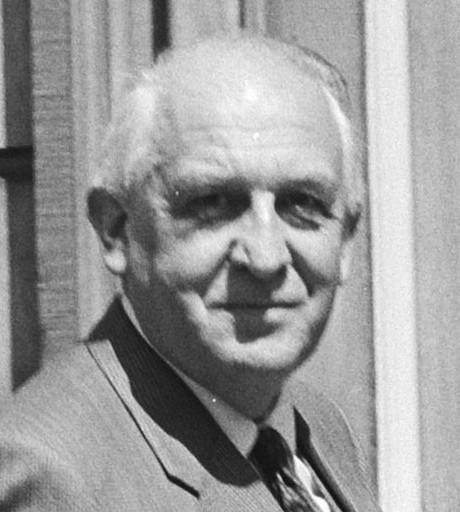
- Henk van Rossum in 1982

Member of the House of Representatives
- In office 1 March 1967 – 3 June 1986

Leader of the Reformed Political Party
- In office 27 May 1981 – 21 May 1986
- Preceded by: Hette Abma
- Succeeded by: Bas van der Vlies

Personal details
- Born: Hendrik van Rossum; 14 December 1919 Melissant
- Died: 17 June 2017 (aged 97) Zeist
- Party: SGP

Hendrik van Rossum (14 December 1919 – 17 June 2017) was a Dutch politician who served in the House of Representatives from 1967 to 1986 as a member of the Reformed Political Party. From 1981 to 1986, he was Leader of the Reformed Political Party.

He died in Zeist on 17 June 2017, aged 97.
