= Pieter Zandt =

Dutch politician (1880–1961)

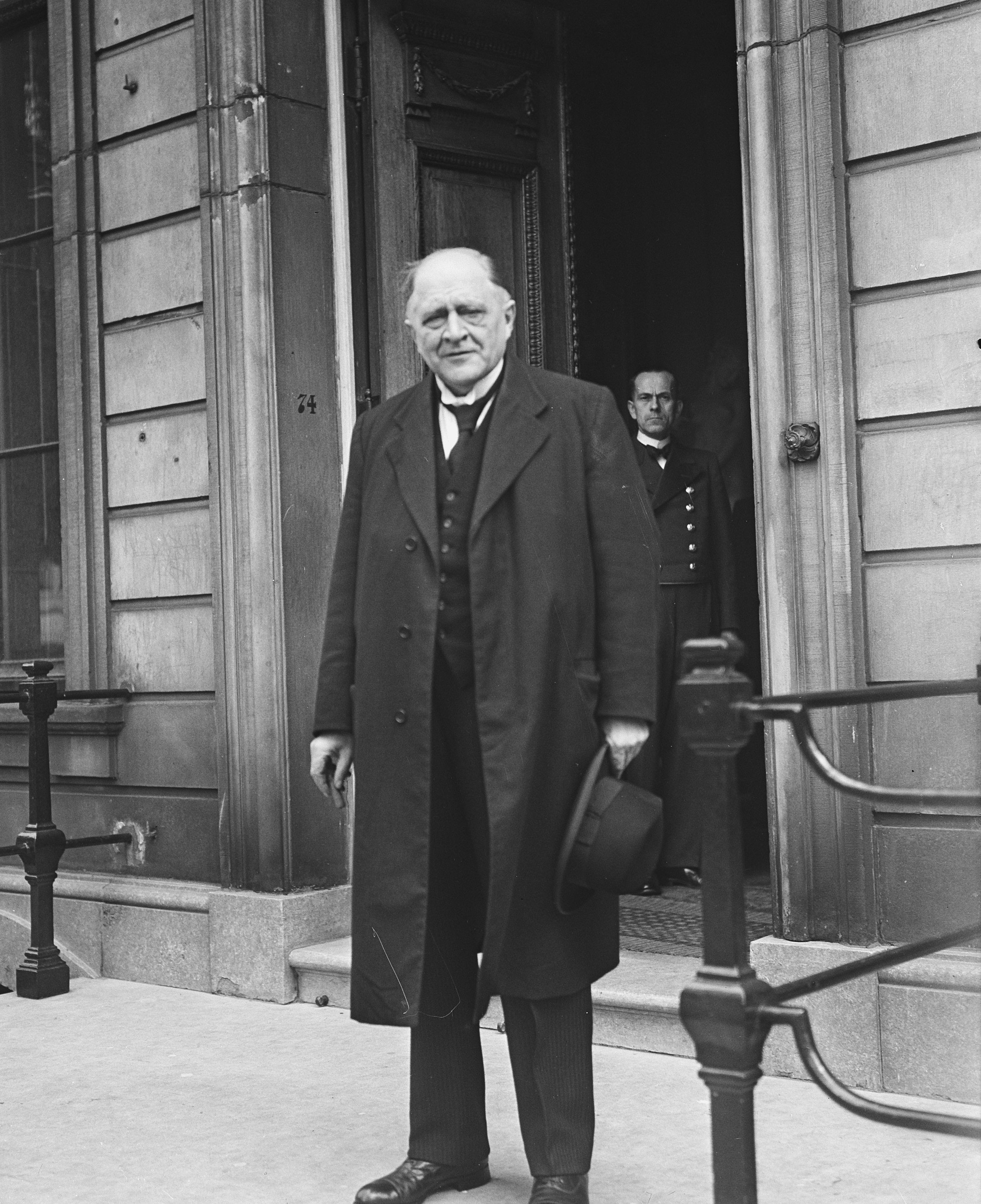
- Pieter Zandt in 1955

Member of the House of Representatives
- In office 15 September 1925 – 4 March 1961

Leader of the Reformed Political Party
- In office 1945–1961
- Preceded by: Gerrit Hendrik Kersten
- Succeeded by: Cor van Dis Sr.

Personal details
- Born: 6 March 1880 Stedum
- Died: 4 March 1961 (aged 80) Delft
- Party: SGP
- Spouse: Jantienne Gerharda Helene Pruissen (m. 1906)
- Education: Utrecht University

Pieter Zandt (6 March 1880–4 March 1961) was a Dutch Reformed minister and politician who was a member of the House of Representatives from 1925 to 1961 for the Reformed Political Party (SGP). He served as the SGP's parliamentary leader from 1945 until his death, succeeding the party's founder Gerrit Hendrik Kersten.

== Early life ==
Pieter Zandt was born on 6 March 1880 in the village of Stedum in the province of Groningen. After completing his secondary education at a Reformed gymnasium in Kampen, he began his studies in theology at Utrecht University in 1900. While initially influenced by the thought of Tolstoy and Hegel, he underwent a sudden conversion to orthodox Reformed Christianity in 1902 and 1903 and would later go on to label them as "unbelievers".

In 1905, he was ordained as minister in the Dutch Reformed Church, and took on a position as minister in Kamperveen the next year. For the next two decades he worked as minister for various parishes, moving to Loon op Zand in 1909, Grafhorst the next year, Ede in 1915 and finally to Delft in 1919 where he remained as minister until 1925.

== Political career ==
In 1922, Zandt joined the Reformed Political Party due to his disillusionment with mainstream Protestant political parties, the Anti-Revolutionary Party and the Christian Historical Union, and joined party leadership the next year. In the 1925 Dutch general election, Zandt was first elected to the House of Representatives as a representative of the SGP, serving alongside Gerrit Hendrik Kersten until 1945. In 1931, Zandt was elected to the provincial council of South Holland, serving until its disbandment by the German occupation in 1941. In 1945, Zandt was made leader of the SGP and its parliamentary leader in the House of Representatives. In 1946, he became SGP party chairman after having been made head editor of party publication De Banier the year prior. Zandt also again became a member of the provincial council of South Holland that year, and also joined the municipal council of Delft, serving in both offices until his death in 1961.

Like Kersten, Zandt thought the government should act directly according to the commandments of the Bible, and saw the other Protestant political parties of the time as apostates. The SGP under Zandt's leadership too sought to condemn matters those parties ignored, such as blasphemy and Catholicism. In November 1925, during Zandt's first year as MP, the SGP had caused the collapse of the First Colijn cabinet by introducing an amendment stripping funds for the Dutch mission to the Holy See, leading to the resignation of the Catholic ministers in the cabinet after the CHU voted in favour in what became known as the Night of Kersten. Throughout his career he would continue to harshly criticise the ARP and CHU for their cooperation with the Catholic People's Party, though with significantly less influence than his predecessor. In 1953, he demanded the withdrawal of the 25 guilders banknote after discovering it depicted St. Martin of Tours, seeing it as a sign of the growing, pernicious influence of the Roman Catholic Church in Dutch society.

On domestic affairs, Zandt was deeply conservative, seeing his political activity as a way to combat the shifting zeitgeist and uphold what he saw as "the old, proven truth" of the word of God. He opposed mandatory government insurance as Kersten had, as well as vaccines as being a government imposition contrary to the will of God. He opposed cultural subsidies, swearing, and state lotteries. On foreign policy, he was opposed to Indonesian independence, strongly condemned Dutch membership in international organizations, speaking out against the League of Nations in 1931 because the organisation was not founded on Biblical principles, and opposed the United Nations on similar grounds.

Zandt died in Delft on 4 March 1961 at the age of 80 as the oldest sitting MP in the House of Representatives.
