= Reformed Association in the Protestant Church in the Netherlands =

The Reformed Association in the Protestant Church in the Netherlands (Dutch: Gereformeerde Bond in de Protestantse Kerk in Nederland) is a confessional orthodox Calvinist group and movement within the Protestant Church in the Netherlands (abbreviated PCN; Dutch: Protestantse Kerk in Nederland, abbreviated PKN).

From 1906 to 2005 the official name was Reformed Association to spread and defend the Dutch Reformed Calvinist Church. On May 24, 2005, the new name of the association has become Federation of Reformed Protestant Church in the Netherlands. It consists of 475 congregations and 290,000 members within the PCN.

It was founded on April 18, 1906, in the former Dutch Reformed Church (Dutch: Nederlandse Hervormde Kerk). The reason was that Rev. Adrian Bahler who had written that Christianity could learn a lot from Buddhism, but the Synod didn't respond to this.

It adheres to the Three Forms of Unity.

The Reformed Association also involved in the Reformed Youth Association and the Reformed Mission League.

Within the Reformed Association there was strong resistance against the formation of the Protestant Church in the Netherlands, a union of the Dutch Reformed Church, the Reformed Churches in the Netherlands and the Evangelical Lutheran Church in the Kingdom of the Netherlands. When the merger of these denominations took place on May 1, 2004, some congregations separated to form the Restored Reformed Church (Dutch: Hersteld Hervormde Kerk, abbreviated HHK).
