= Gert van den Berg (politician) =

Dutch politician (1935–2024)

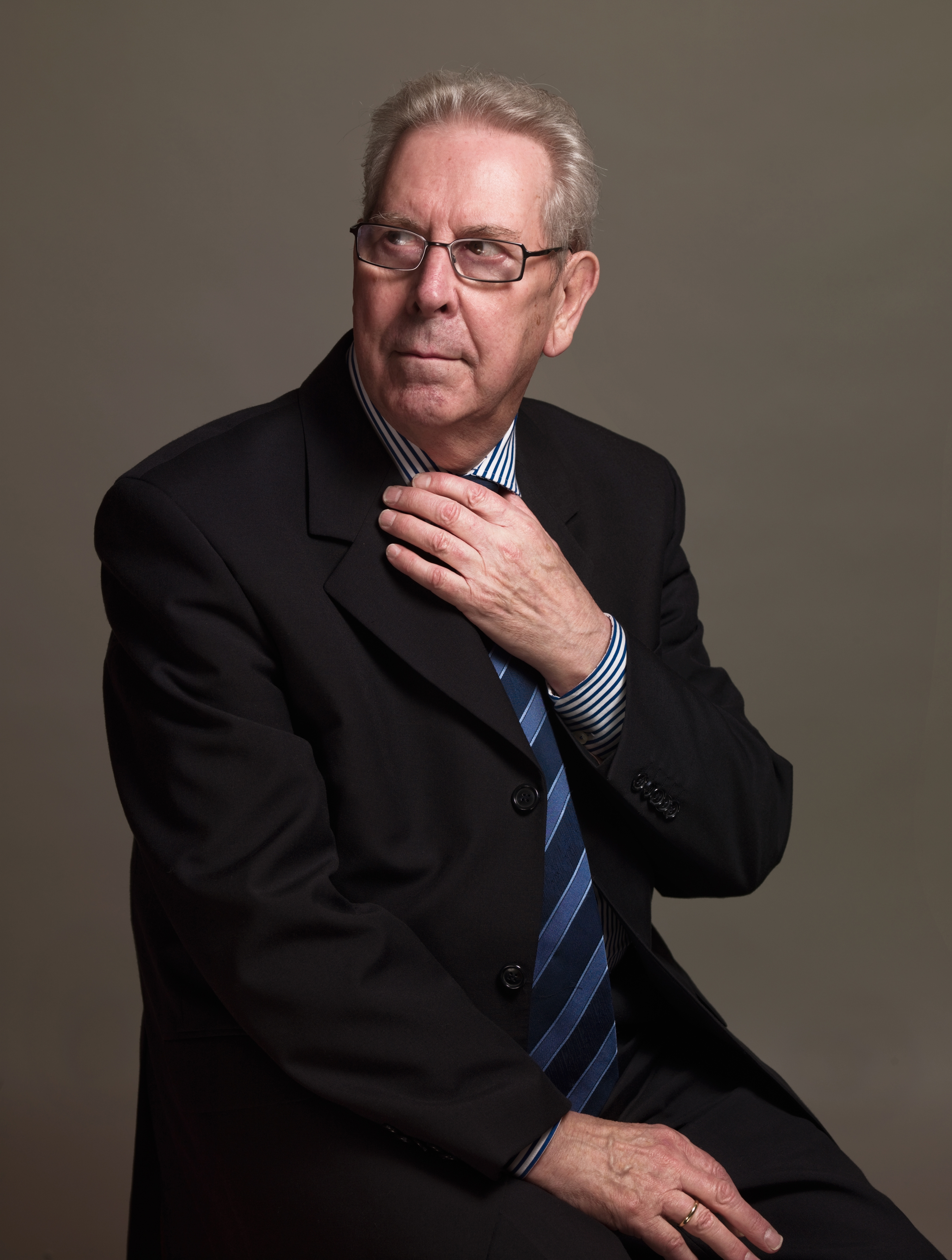
Van den Berg in 2011

Gerrit "Gert" van den Berg (10 October 1935 – 13 June 2024) was a Dutch politician. As a member of the Reformed Political Party (SGP) he was a member of the Dutch Senate from 1995 to 2011.

Van den Berg was a member of the Reformed Congregations. He died on 13 June 2024, at the age of 88.

== Sources ==
- (in Dutch) Parlement.com biography
