= Gerrit Hendrik Kersten =

Dutch Christian minister and politician

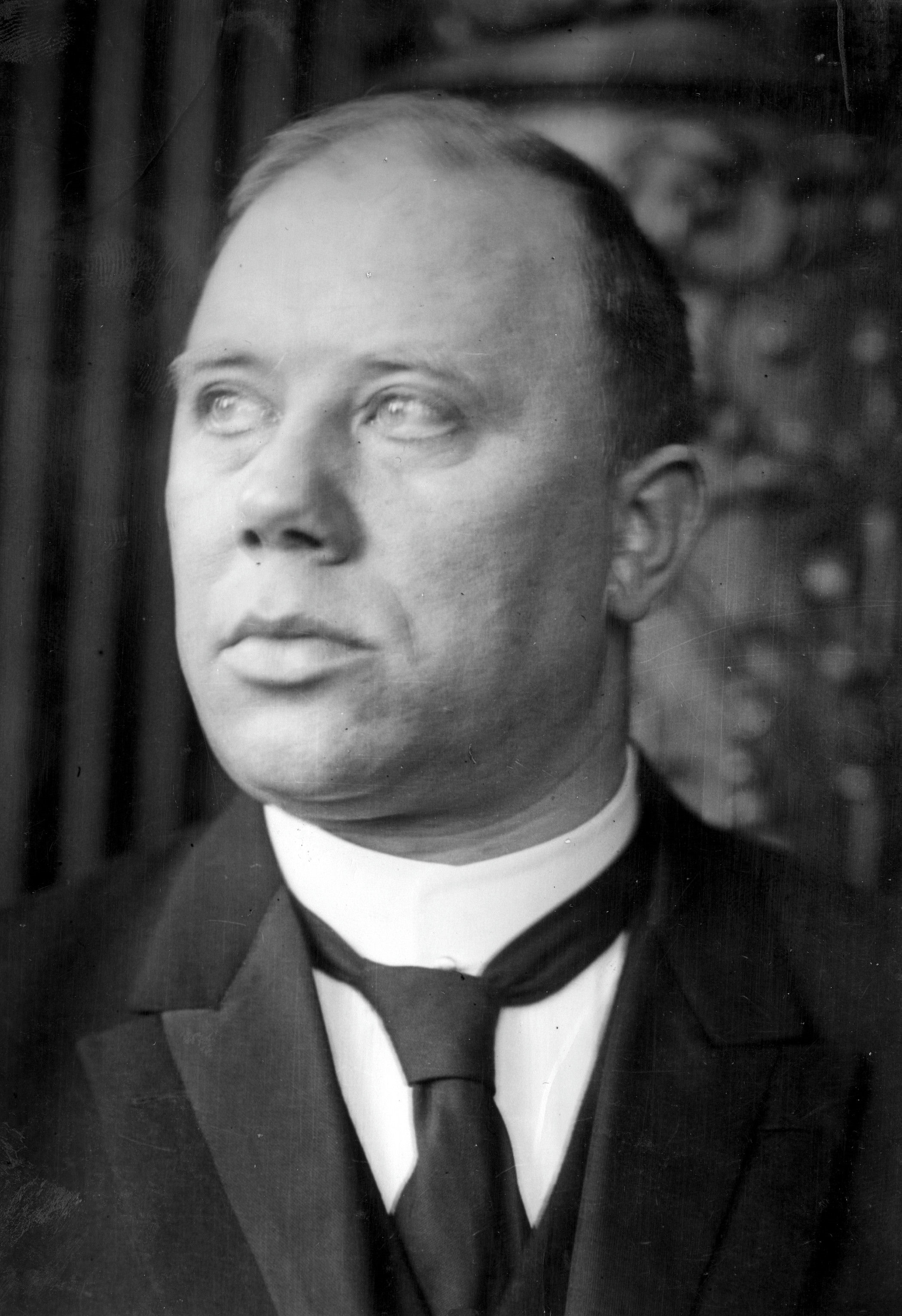

Party leader – Reformed Political Party
- In office April 1918 – 14 September 1945
- Preceded by: Barend Lemans
- Succeeded by: Pieter Zandt

Party Chair – Reformed Political Party
- In office April 1918 – 1945
- Preceded by: none
- Succeeded by: Pieter Zandt

Parliamentary leader – Reformed Political Party
- In office 25 July 1922 – 14 September 1945
- Preceded by: none
- Succeeded by: Pieter Zandt

Member of the House of Representatives
- In office 25 July 1922 – 14 September 1945

Personal details
- Born: 6 August 1882 Deventer, Netherlands
- Died: 6 September 1948 (aged 66) Waarde, Netherlands
- Party: Reformed Political (1918–1948)
- Spouse: Catharina Adriana Wisse
- Children: 6 sons, 4 daughters
- Occupation: Politician, minister, journalist, educator

Gerrit Hendrik Kersten (6 August 1882 – 6 September 1948) was a Dutch Calvinist minister and politician. After briefly working as a primary school teacher Kersten was inducted into his first pastorate in Meliskerke in 1905 without formal theological training. In 1907 Kersten was instrumental in achieving a union of two groups of disparate, low-church groups of small secessional congregations, resulting in the formation of the Reformed Congregations. Eleven years later, in 1918, he established the Reformed Political Party to realize his vision of "a Calvinist Netherlands ruled on a biblical basis without cinema, sports, vaccination and social security". He was the party's first member of the House of Representatives, being elected in 1922. He would remain in parliament until his debarment in 1945.

On the evening of 10 November 1925, Kersten, ever opposed to Catholicism, proposed an amendment to the 1926 budget for the Ministry for Foreign Affairs. Kersten's proposal would result in ending financial support for a Dutch diplomatic office at the Holy See. The amendment was adopted the next day with support from one of the government parties Christian Historical Union, which in turn led to the resignation of four Catholic government ministers and the fall of the first coalition government of Hendrik Colijn. The fall of the first Colijn cabinet after only three months became known as the Night of Kersten.

Kersten was a staunch critic of the policies of Colijn. The speaker of the Dutch parliament had parts of Kersten's contributions to debates edited in the Proceedings no less than thirteen times between 1922 and 1940. Kersten feared the rise of fascism and Nazism in the inter-war period, but assessed fascism's authoritarian tendencies favourably, seeing socialism and Catholic Christianity as greater evils.

During World War II, Kersten denounced resistance against the Nazis, claiming the occupation of the Netherlands was a deserved divine punishment for desecration of the Lord's Day (Sunday). He also refused to sign a 1941 protest of the Convent of Dutch Churches (Dutch: Convent der Kerken) against the persecution of Jews during the war. After the war, a government committee barred him from returning to Parliament. He focused on writing theological works. Kersten died three years later, in 1948.
