= Reformed Political Party =

Dutch political party

Reformed Political Party Staatkundig Gereformeerde Partij
- Abbreviation: SGP
- Leader: Chris Stoffer (list)
- Chairman: Dick van Meeuwen (list)
- Leader in the Senate: Peter Schalk (list)
- Leader in the House of Representatives: Chris Stoffer (list)
- Leader in the European Parliament: Bert-Jan Ruissen
- Founded: 1918 (Note: 24 April 1918 is often named the foundation date, but the foundation meeting took place earlier in the year, although the exact date is unknown.)
- Headquarters: Dinkel 7 Rotterdam
- Youth wing: Reformed Political Party Youth
- Think tank: Guido de Brès Foundation
- Membership (2026): ▲31,426
- Ideology: Christian right; Social conservatism; Theocracy
- Political position: Right-wing
- Religion: Reformed Christianity
- European affiliation: European Christian Political Party
- European Parliament group: European Conservatives and Reformists Group
- Colours: Orange; Blue
- House of Representatives: 3 / 150
- Senate: 2 / 75
- European Parliament: 1 / 31
- provincial councils: 16 / 570

Website
- sgp.nl (not accessible on Sundays)

The Reformed Political Party (Dutch: Staatkundig Gereformeerde Partij [ˌstaːtˈkʏndə(x) xəˌreːfɔrˈmeːrdə pɑrˈtɛi], SGP) is a theocratic and ultraconservative Reformed Christian political party in the Netherlands. The SGP is the oldest political party in the Netherlands existing in its present form, and has been in opposition for its entire existence. Since 1925, it has won between 1.5% and 2.5% of the votes in general elections – invariably receiving 2–3 seats in the House of Representatives, making it the country's most stable political party in terms of representation. Owing to its orthodox political ideals and its traditional role in the opposition, the party is considered a testimonial party. Since 2023 its leader has been Chris Stoffer.

== History ==
=== Foundation ===
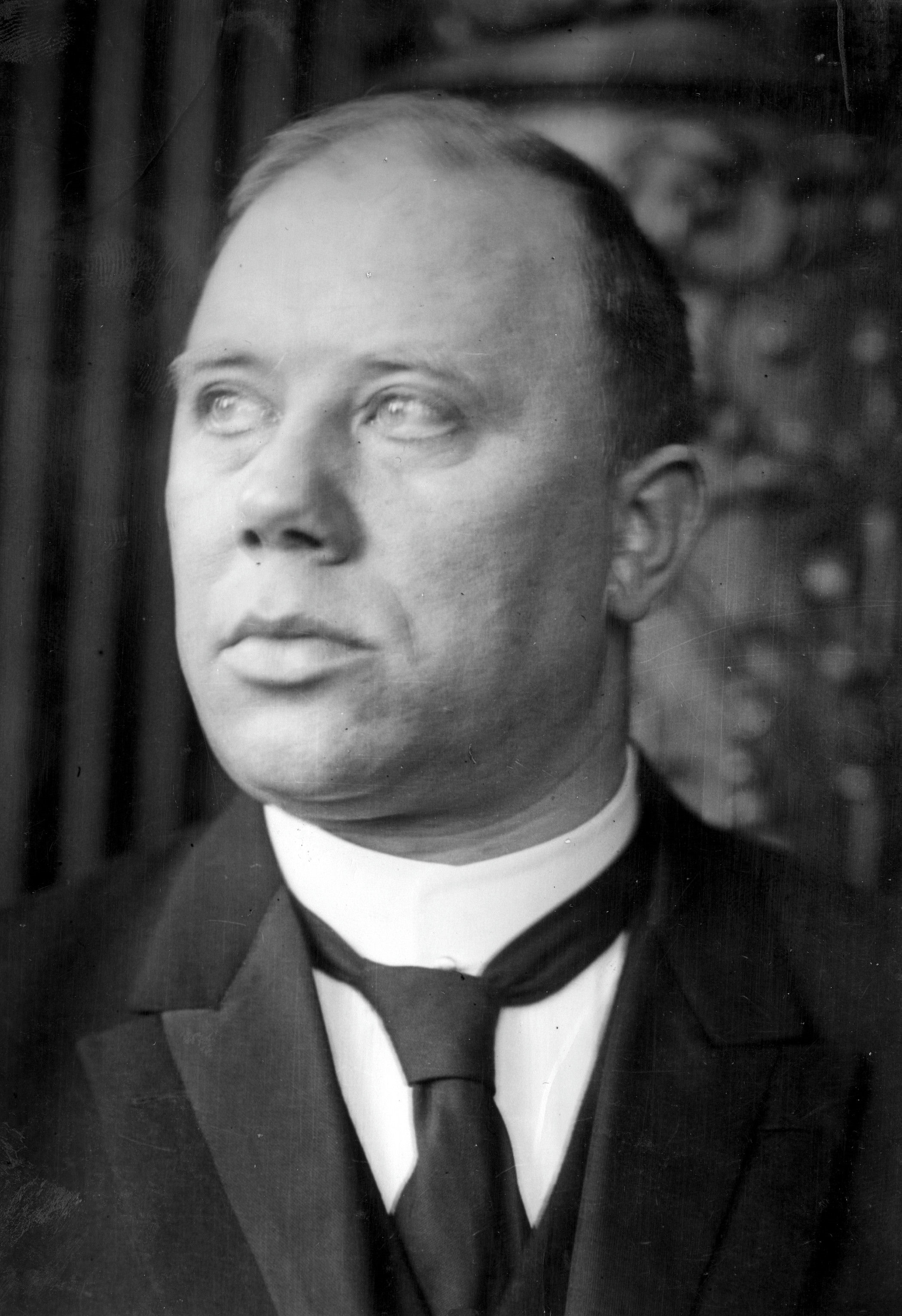
Founder of the SGP, Gerrit Hendrik Kersten

The SGP was founded in 1918 by orthodox Protestants led by Yerseke pastor Gerrit Hendrik Kersten, some of which originated from the Protestant Anti-Revolutionary Party (ARP). After the Pacification of 1917, compulsory voting and proportional representation was introduced in the Netherlands. The founders did not want to vote for existing parties, but saw an opportunity for a smaller party because of proportional representation. The party first participated in the 1918 general election. The hastily organised campaign focused on the ARP and its support of what SGP called state coercion, such as compulsory vaccination and insurance law. Because some might object to him combining being politician and pastor, Kersten was not a candidate, but instead Barend Lemans and Pieter Gijze. The party received over 5,000 votes, not enough for a seat.

Despite not winning a seat, the SGP continued its activities In 1919, the party board started a petition against the Invaliditeitswet (Disability Act), which forced workers to pay premiums to insure against disability. It received 4,800 signatures. The party encouraged its members to send back their stamp cards which tracked their premiums. In December 1920, the Senate passed a law that would accommodate their conscientious objections. A similar petition against compulsory vaccination received 27,059 signatures in 1922, but sorted no effect.

=== 1922–1945 ===
For the 1922 general election, Kersten was lead candidate, accepting objections within his electorate. The party won one seat in the House of Representatives, which was taken by Kersten. His speeches in parliament regularly received media attention, for example when he opposed the 1928 Summer Olympics in Amsterdam. In the 1925 general election, the party won another seat which was taken by Pieter Zandt.

Later that year, the anti-Catholic SGP would cause the fall of the second Ruijs de Beerenbrouck cabinet in what became known as the Night of Kersten. During the debate on the budget of the Foreign Affairs Ministry, Kersten had proposed cutting the budget of the diplomatic mission of the Netherlands to the Holy See. The amendment received a majority, because it was supported by the Protestant Christian Historical Union (CHU), which was in cabinet together with the Catholic General League. It resulted in more publicity and a third seat in the 1929 general election, which was taken by Cor van Dis sr.. Kersten, Zandt and Van Dis formed the parliamentary group until the 1937 general election, when the SGP lost one seat. The SGP did not achieve much in parliament other than during the Night of Kersten, but achieved some smaller goals outside of parliament through contact with the ministers.

Kersten saw the German invasion of the Netherlands in 1940 as a punishment for its sins. He rejected resistance against the German occupation and was seen as friendly towards them. After the war, he was nominated again as lead candidate, but he was barred from the House of Representatives for his stances during the war.

=== 1945–present ===
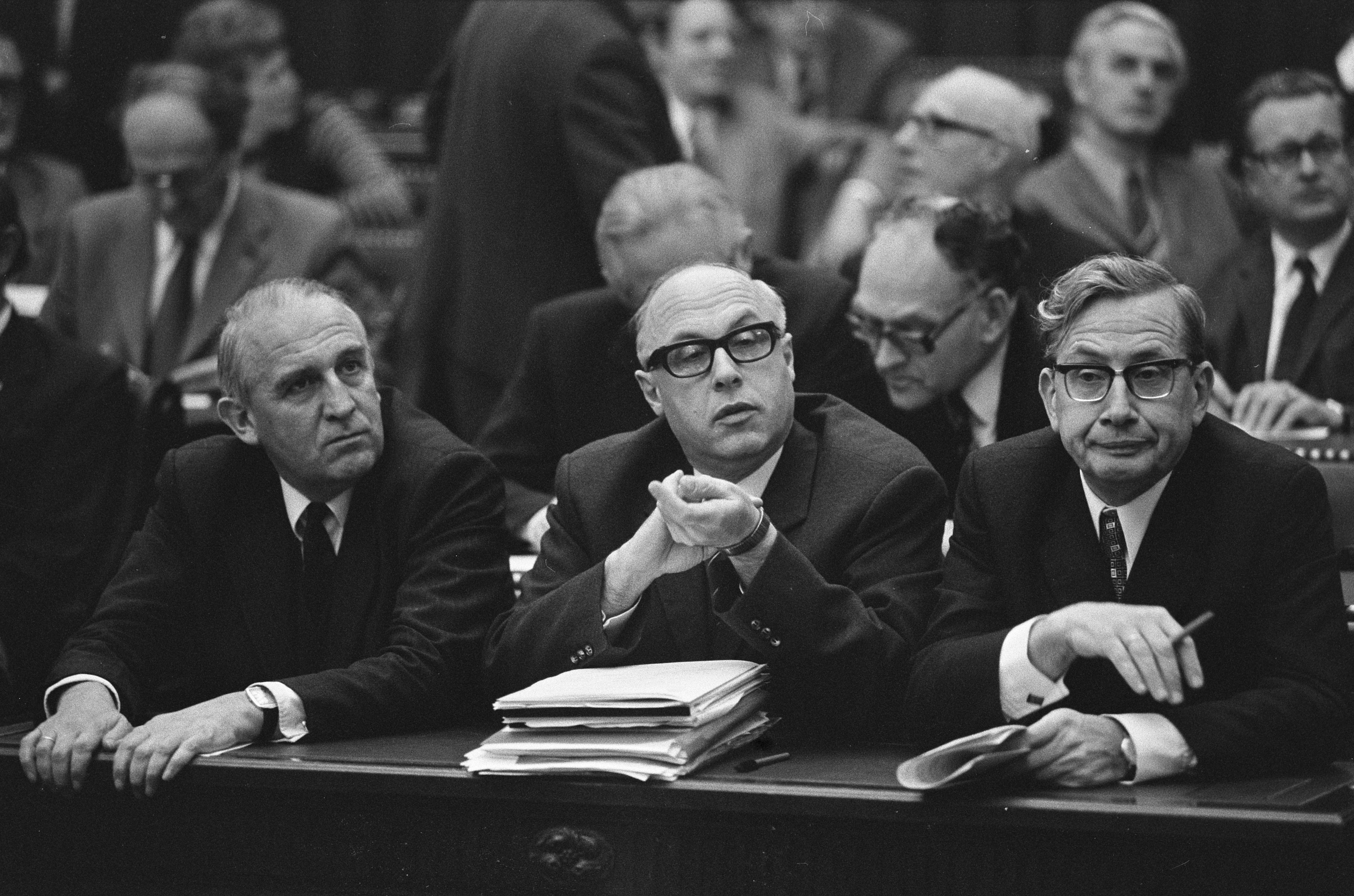
Henk van Rossum (party leader 1981–1986), Cor van Dis Sr. (party leader 1961–1971) and Hette Abma (party leader 1971–1981) in the House of Representatives in 1973.

Kersten was succeeded by Zandt, under whose leadership the SGP was very stable, continually getting 2% of votes. In the 1956 general election, the SGP profited from the enlargement of parliament, and entered the Senate for the first time. It lost that seat in 1960 Senate election, but regained it in the 1971 Senate election.

In 1961 Zandt died and was succeeded by Van Dis sr. After ten years he stood down in favour of Reverend Hette Abma, who also stepped down after ten years, in favour of Henk van Rossum, a civil engineer. In the 1984 European Parliament election, the SGP joined the two other orthodox Protestant parties, the Reformatory Political Federation (RPF) and the Reformed Political League (GPV). They won one seat in the European Parliament, which was taken by SGP member Leen van der Waal, a mechanical engineer.

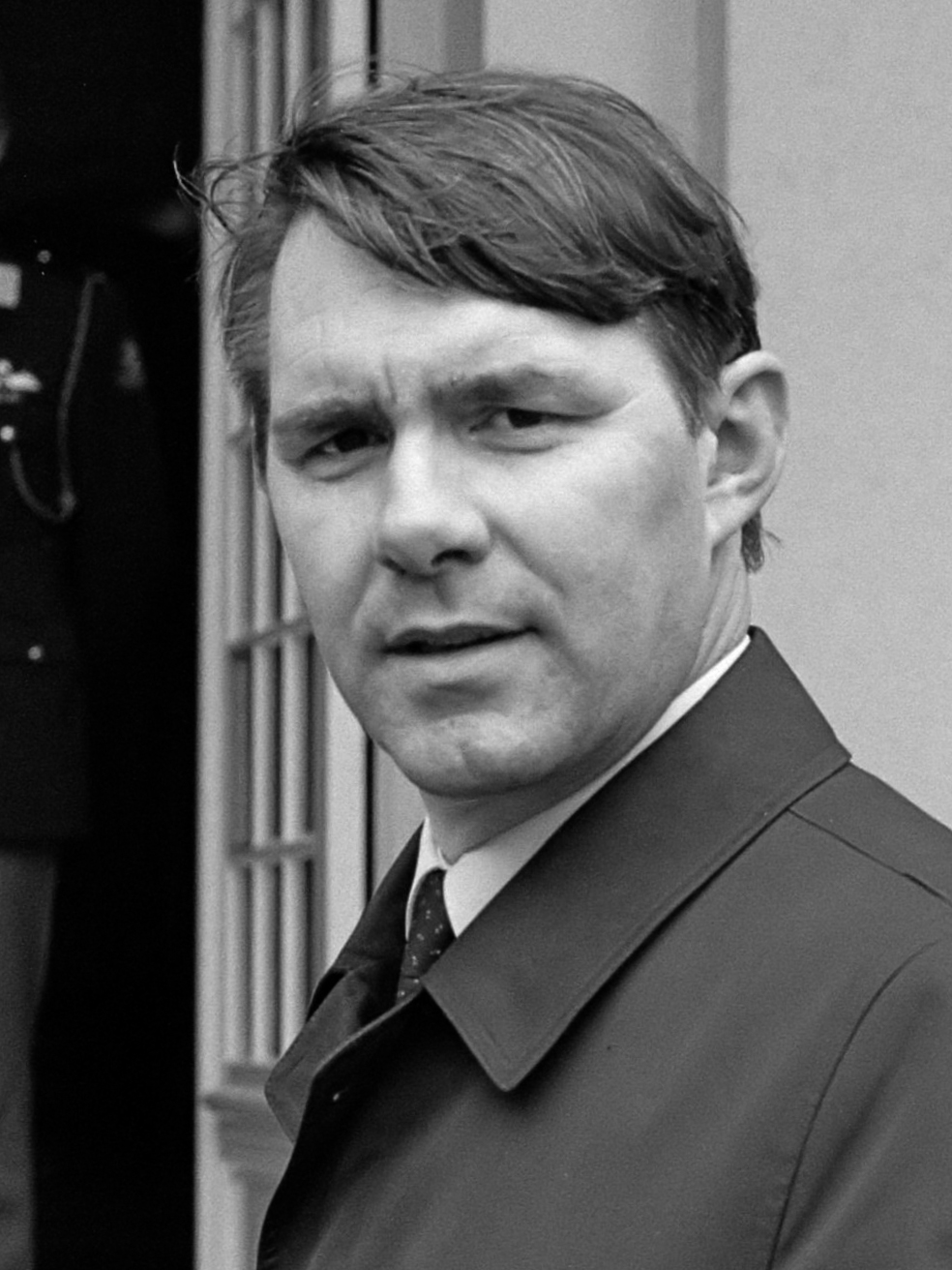
Bas van der Vlies, party leader from 1986 to 2010.

In 1986, Van Rossum was succeeded by Bas van der Vlies. In the 1994 election the party lost one seat in the House, regained it in 1998, and lost it again in 2002. During the 2003 cabinet formation, the Christian Democratic Appeal (CDA) and the People's Party for Freedom and Democracy (VVD) held talks with the SGP — the first time that the SGP was seriously considered as a possible coalition partner. Ultimately, the Democrats 66 joined the second Balkenende cabinet instead of the SGP, mostly because of the ideological differences between the VVD and the SGP.

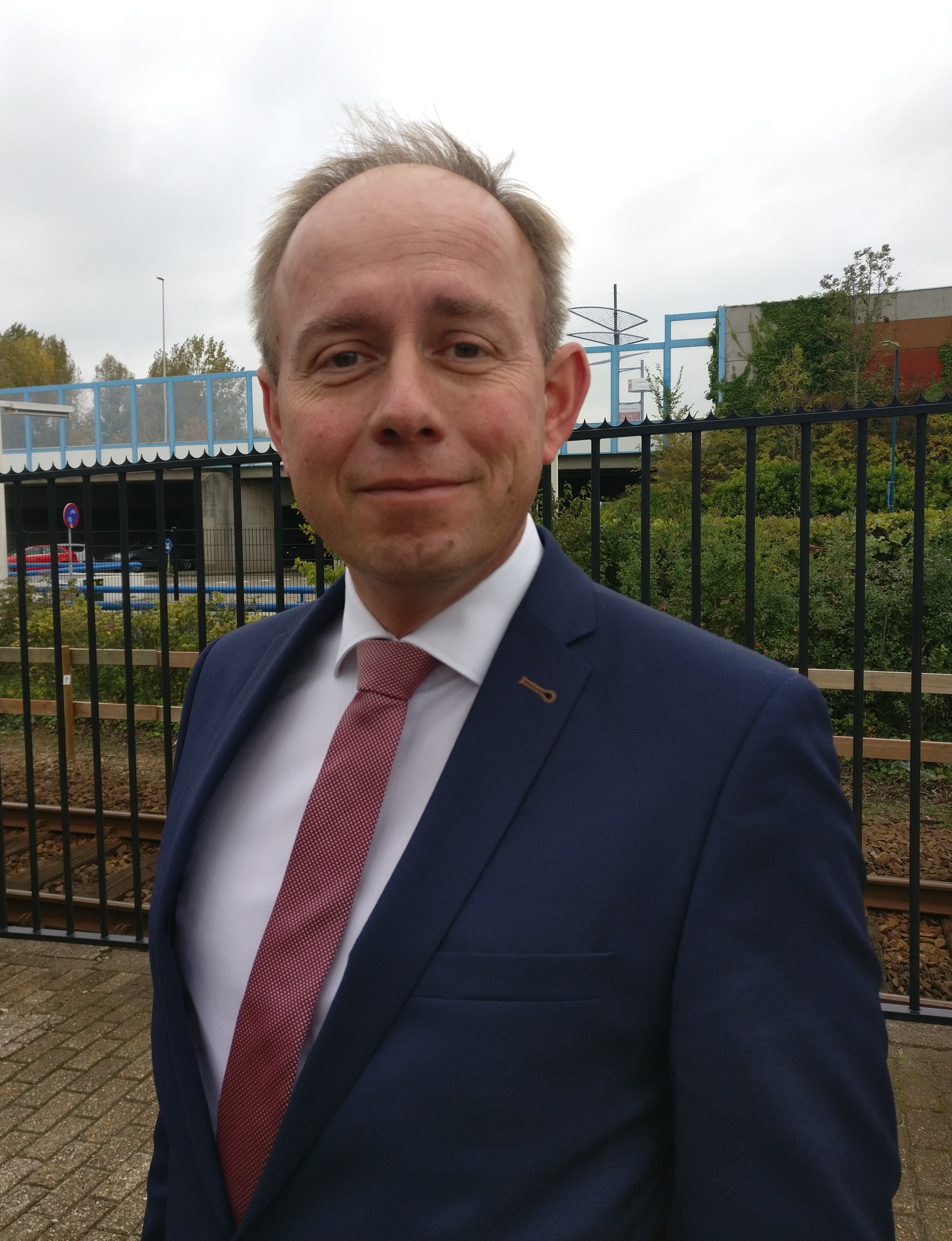
Kees van der Staaij, party leader from 2010 to 2023

In 2010, Kees van der Staaij succeeded Van der Vlies. During the 2010 cabinet formation, the negotiating CDA, VVD and Party for Freedom (PVV) took into account some wishes of the SGP, so that SGP would provide confidence and supply in the Senate where the first Rutte cabinet did not have a majority.

== Ideology and political positions ==
As a Protestant fundamentalist party the SGP draws much from its ideology from the Reformed Christian tradition, specifically the ecclesiastical doctrinal standards known as the Three Forms of Unity, including an unamended version of the Belgic Confession (Dutch: Nederlandse Geloofsbelijdenis). It includes 21 words that were removed by the synod of the Reformed Churches in the Netherlands in 1905, which state that the government must "eliminate and eradicate all idolatry and false religion, so as to destroy the kingdom of Antichrist". This contrasted with the other two Protestant parties, the Anti-Revolutionary Party (ARP) and the Christian Historical Union (CHU) when SGP was founded, which had accepted the change.

=== Church and state ===
The SGP is a theocratic party, although its precise position on the relation between religion and politics has changed over time. The SGP does favor some, but no strict, separation of church and state. The church and state should cooperate, including the advancement of the true faith. (Note: Both Kersten and Abma did not specify which Reformed denomination this referred to.) The state should not curtail the freedom of the church, while the church similarly should not impose upon the state. Abma rejected theocracy as form of government, instead harmonizing theocracy and democracy. Over time, it has however become more realistic, accepting the religiously neutral state. The party has also tried to distinguish its theocratic positions from Islamic theocracy. The SGP supports freedom of conscience, but not an unconditional freedom of religion.

The SGP is critical of Islam, although Muslims have also been seen as allies against secularism. With the argument that Judeo-Christian culture must be preserved, the party opposes public expressions such as public calls to prayer, big mosques and minarets.

=== Social issues ===
The SGP has generally opposed women's suffrage, both passive and active, believing it to be contrary to a "woman's calling". Some within the party however argue that the biblical argumentation is not clear or that this could hurt them electorally. In 1989 the party changed its principles, approving women voting if they can answer this to God in their conscience. No similar change was made for passive suffrage.

The SGP opposes gay rights. In May 2019, the party voted against banning conversion therapy. In 2024, the SGP introduced a motion in the House of Representatives to call on the government to withdraw the so-called "transgender bill" which had been introduced by the previous Dutch government and would enable people under the age of 16 to legally declare their gender without requiring a medical diagnosis.

The SGP is opposed to abortion and euthanasia. It supports the reintroduction of the death penalty.

=== Israel and Judaism ===
The party has evolved into a pro-Israel party. Due to its early focus on anti-Catholicism and belief in supersessionism, the SGP and Kersten were critical of the reception of German-Jewish refugees in the years leading up to World War II. The establishment of the state of Israel in 1948 and its victories against neighboring Arab countries contributed to increased sympathy among SGP members. From 1968 onwards, this was also evident in Abma's contributions in parliament. In 2000, a separate article was included in the party's manifesto emphasizing the importance of good diplomatic relations with Israel and advocating for secure borders for Israel.

== Representation ==
=== House of Representatives ===
Election	Lead candidate	List	Votes	%	Seats	+/–	Ref.
1918	Barend Lemans	List	5,180	0.39	0 / 100	New	
1922	Gerrit Hendrik Kersten	List	26,744	0.91	1 / 100	▲1	
1925	Gerrit Hendrik Kersten	List	62,513	2.03	2 / 100	▲1	
1929	Gerrit Hendrik Kersten	List	71,420	2.27	3 / 100	▲1	
1933	Gerrit Hendrik Kersten	List	93,275	2.51	3 / 100	0	
1937	Gerrit Hendrik Kersten	List	78,619	1.94	2 / 100	▼1	
1946	Pieter Zandt	List	101,761	2.16	2 / 100	0	
1948	Pieter Zandt	List	116,864	2.37	2 / 100	0	
1952	Pieter Zandt	List	129,073	2.42	2 / 100	0	
1956	Pieter Zandt	List	129,515	2.26	3 / 150	▲1	
1959	Pieter Zandt	List	129,678	2.16	3 / 150	0	
1963	Cor van Dis Sr.	List	143,549	2.29	3 / 150	0	
1967	Cor van Dis Sr.	List	138,119	2.01	3 / 150	0	
1971	Hette Abma	List	148,221	2.35	3 / 150	0	
1972	Hette Abma	List	163,114	2.21	3 / 150	0	
1977	Hette Abma	List	177,010	2.13	3 / 150	0	
1981	Henk van Rossum	List	171,324	1.97	3 / 150	0	
1982	Henk van Rossum	List	156,636	1.90	3 / 150	0	
1986	Bas van der Vlies	List	159,740	1.74	3 / 150	0	
1989	Bas van der Vlies	List	166,082	1.87	3 / 150	0	
1994	Bas van der Vlies	List	155,251	1.73	2 / 150	▼1	
1998	Bas van der Vlies	List	153,583	1.78	3 / 150	▲1	
2002	Bas van der Vlies	List	163,562	1.72	2 / 150	▼1	
2003	Bas van der Vlies	List	150,305	1.56	2 / 150	0	
2006	Bas van der Vlies	List	153,266	1.56	2 / 150	0	
2010	Kees van der Staaij	List	163,581	1.74	2 / 150	0	
2012	Kees van der Staaij	List	196,780	2.09	3 / 150	▲1	
2017	Kees van der Staaij	List	218,950	2.08	3 / 150	0	
2021	Kees van der Staaij	List	215,249	2.07	3 / 150	0	
2023	Chris Stoffer	List	217,270	2.08	3 / 150	0	
2025	Chris Stoffer	List	238,093	2.25	3 / 150	0	

=== Senate ===
Election	Lead candidate	List	Votes	Weighted votes	%	Seats	+/–	Ref.
2023	Peter Schalk	List	17	4,436	2.76	2 / 75		

=== European Parliament ===
Election	List	Votes	%	Seats	+/–	EP Group
1979	List	126,412	2.23	0 / 25	New	
2024	List	228,036	3.66	1 / 31	0	

Between 1984 and 2019, the SGP filed joint candidate lists with the Christian Union and its predecessors. See CU-SGP for these election results.

Since the 1984 European Parliament election the party has had one elected representative in the European Parliament. From 1984 to 1997 Leen van der Waal was the representative, from 1999 Bas Belder was the party's representative, succeeded by Bert-Jan Ruissen in the 2019 European Parliament election. In European Parliament elections, the SGP formed one candidate list with the Christian Union, called CU–SGP, until the 2024 European Parliament election. The SGP's representative is a member of the European Christian Political Party and European Conservatives and Reformists Group (ECR Group).

== Electorate ==
The SGP has had a very stable electorate since first entering the States-General in 1922. Since winning a second seat in 1926, it has varied between two and three seats in the House of Representatives.

=== Religion ===
Most of its electorate is formed by so-called pietistic Reformed Protestants ("bevindelijk gereformeerden"), (Note: Translation derived from: De Jager, Koos-jan (2018). "Die Mij tergen, hebben verzekeringen". Religie & Samenleving. 13 (2): 87–106. doi:10.54195/RS.11853.) Reformed Protestants for whom personal religious experience is very important. Most of the Old Reformed Congregations and the Reformed Congregations are considered pietistic Reformed Protestants. Pietistic Reformed Protestants are also present in the Christian Reformed Churches, the Reformed Association in the Protestant Church in the Netherlands and the Restored Reformed Church.

=== Geographical ===
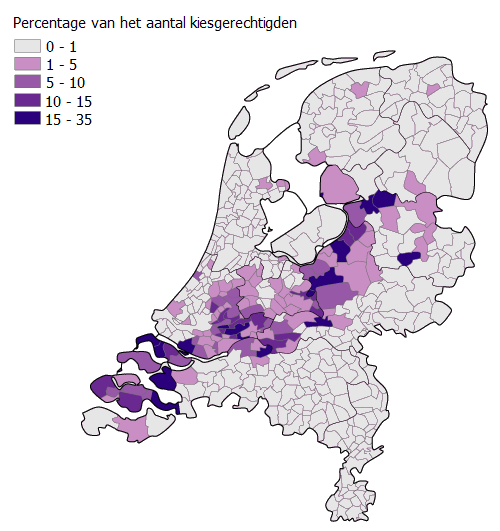
Areas where the SGP received a significant number of votes in the 2010 general election, largely co-extensive with the Dutch Bible Belt.

The SGP's support is concentrated geographically in the Dutch Bible Belt, a band of strongly Reformed and mostly rural municipalities ranging from Zeeland in the South via Goeree-Overflakkee and the Alblasserwaard in South Holland and the Veluwe in Gelderland to the Western part of Overijssel, around Staphorst. Outside the Bible Belt, the SGP also performs well in Urk, Uddel and Rijssen-Holten. The geographical concentration of SGP voters has however decreased between 1956 and 2017. Its votes have shifted away from Utrecht and South Holland towards Zeeland, Gelderland, Overijssel, with a modest turnout in Drenthe and Gelderland.

=== Gender ===
Despite SGP's opposition to women's suffrage, it draws significant support from women. In the period 1971–1977, when the Dutch National Voter Survey started, around half of its voters were female. This declined to 34% in 1989–1998, but rose back to half in 2010–2017. In the March 2021 general election and the March 2023 provincial elections, nearly 60% of SGP voters were female.

== Organisation ==
=== Organisational structure ===
The highest organ of the SGP is the congress, which is formed by delegates from the municipal branches. It convenes once every year. It appoints the party board and decides the order of the Senate, House of Representatives, European Parliament candidates list and has the last say over the party program. The SGP chairman is always a minister. Since 2001 this position is ceremonial, as the general chair leads the party's organisation.

The party has 245 municipal branches and has a provincial federation in each province, except for Limburg.

=== Membership ===
==== Female membership ====
Lilian Janse, the first female elected representative for the SGP, being sworn in as municipal councilor of Vlissingen in 2014.

Initially, women were not allowed to be members of the party. In 1983, the first woman, W. van Donge-van Bezooijen, applied for membership, but The Hague electoral association had rejected her application because she was a woman. She then wrote to the national party board, after which she and Riet Grabijn-van Putten became member in 1985. The party board however changed its position in 1991, rejecting membership for women. This position was supported by ninety percent of electoral associations in 1993. The party was aware that this might be against the Convention on the Elimination of All Forms of Discrimination Against Women.

Meanwhile, public opinion in the Netherlands turned against SGP's decision not to allow women. UN committees also recommended intervention. In 2003, the Clara Wichmann Institute and some other organisations sued the Dutch government, for subsidising SGP. The district court of The Hague ruled that the party could no longer receive subsidies from the government, while it did not force the SGP to change it statutes. Based on the verdict, the party decided to allow female membership, while still not allowing them on candidate lists. At the end of 2017, SGP had 800 female members.

Meanwhile, in 2005, the Dutch government had refused the SGP's application for subsidies. The administrative law division of the district court of The Hague supported the rejection. However, the Council of State overturned this decision in December 2007, maintaining that a party's political philosophy takes precedence, and that women have the opportunity to join other political parties where they can obtain a leadership role. Two weeks later, The Hague courts of appeal ruled on the first case that the SGP should also allow women's passive suffrage. The Supreme Court of the Netherlands affirmed this decision in 2010 and an appeal to the European Court of Human Rights was unsuccessful in 2012. As a result, the SGP changed its internal regulations to formally allow women to be candidates in elections, while still discouraging it in their principles.

Some women have been candidates starting with the 2014 municipal elections, with lead candidate Lilian Janse becoming the first female elected representative for the SGP when she was elected municipal councilor in Vlissingen in 2014. However the party hasn't put a woman on the candidates list for a general election.

=== Linked organisations ===
The party publishes the Banner (Dutch: De Banier) two-weekly since 1921. Its think tank was founded in 1974, and it was renamed after Walloon theologian Guido de Brès in 1992. It publishes the quarterly magazine Zicht (Sight). The youth organisation of the SGP is called the Reformed Political Party Youth (SGPJ).

The SGP participates in the Netherlands Institute for Multiparty Democracy, a democracy assistance organisation of seven Dutch political parties.

=== Pillarised organisations ===
The SGP has close links with several other orthodox Protestant organisations, such as several Reformed churches and the newspaper Reformatorisch Dagblad. Together they form a small but strong orthodox-Reformed pillar.

=== Relationships to other parties ===
The SGP has traditionally been very focused on its independence. In the 1950s, the SGP created common candidates lists in municipal elections with the Anti-Revolutionary Party (ARP) and/or Christian Historical Union (CHU). These collaborations stalled when these two parties intensified their collaboration with the Catholic People's Party (KVP).

==== CU, GPV and RPF ====
In 1963 another orthodox Protestant party, the Reformed Political League (GPV) entered parliament, although they had little contact with the SGP at first. Another orthodox Protestant party, the Reformatory Political Federation (RPF). Over time they started to work together to oppose the secularisation and created shared lists and connections between their lists (Dutch: lijstverbinding). This included common lists for the European Parliamentary elections starting in 1984.

After 1993 the cooperation between the GPV and the RPF intensified, but the SGP's position at the time on female suffrage prevented the SGP joining this closer cooperation. However, in 2000 the GPV and RPF merged to form the ChristianUnion (CU). Traditionally the SGP and the CU worked together closely as they were both based on Protestant Christian politics. Recently however, as the CU has moved more towards the centre-left, discernible differences of philosophy between the SGP and CU have caused the parties to not join in elections.

==== Far-right ====
In the 2019 Senate election, some provincial councillors of the far-right Forum for Democracy (FvD) strategically voted for the SGP to keep their second seat. The parties also joined the same European Parliament Group after the 2019 European Parliament election. In 2021, incoming party chair Van Meeuwen ruled out cooperation with the FvD, although party leader Van der Staaij didn't want to rule any parties out in advance.
