= List of candidates in the 1986 Dutch general election =

Prior to the 1986 Dutch general election, contesting parties put forward party lists.

== 6: Reformed Political Party ==
Candidate list for the Reformed Political Party
Number	Candidate	Votes	Result	Ref.
1	Bas van der Vlies	150,549	Elected	
2	Cor van Dis	1,588	Elected	
3	Koos van den Berg	899	Elected	
4	Bert Scholten	2,378		
5	Gerrit Holdijk	435		
6	P.H.D. van Ree	192		
7	Gert van den Berg	232		
8	Driekus Barendregt	149		
9	R. van Ommeren	111		
10	J.H. Wolterink	173		
11	C.S.L. Janse	58		
12	L. Bolier	125		
13	J. Dankers	134		
14	Leen van der Waal	125		
15	S. de Jong	225		
16	W.Chr. Hovius	517		
17	W. Bron	161		
18	W. Pieters	447		
19	N. Verdouw	173		
20	K. van der Plas	135		
21	Mark Markusse	50		
22	P.C. den Uil	139		
23	Rinus Houtman	68		
24	J.A. Coster	43		
25	M. Burggraaf	118		
26	W. Nagtegaal	46		
27	M.C. Tanis	197		
28	Cor Boender	121		
29	B. Stolk	60		
30	A.K. van der Staaij	92		

== Source ==
- Kiesraad (27 May 1986). "Proces-verbaal zitting Kiesraad uitslag Tweede Kamerverkiezing 1986" (PDF) (in Dutch).
