= Uddel =

- Village
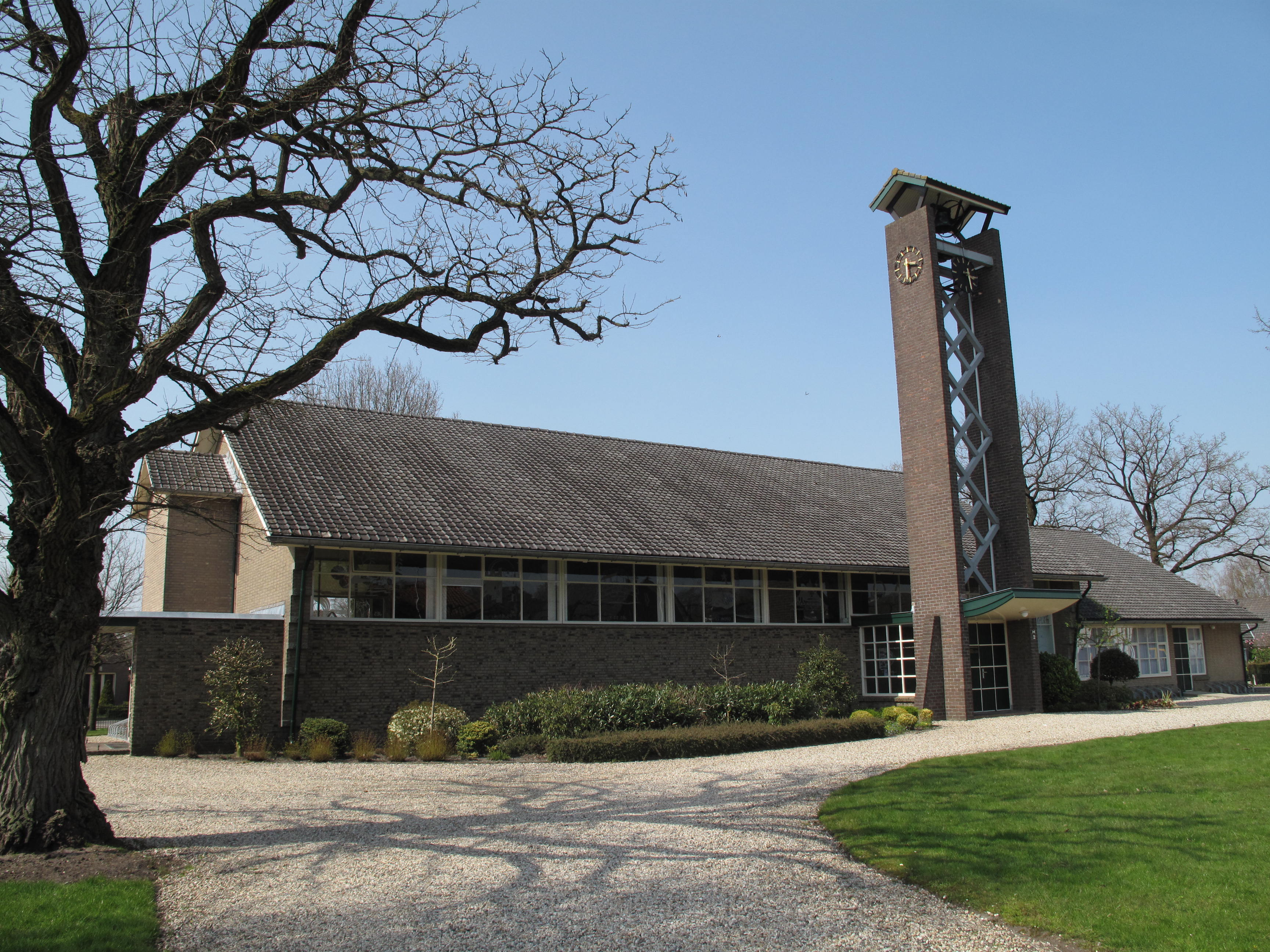
- Church of Uddel

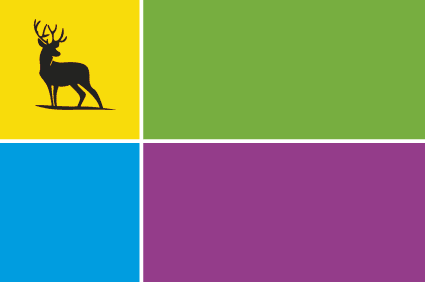
- Flag

- Location of Uddel in the municipality of Apeldoorn (the urban area of Uddel is red and the rural area is pink)

- Location of Uddel in Gelderland Uddel (Netherlands)
- Coordinates: 52°15′27″N 5°46′57″E
- Country: Netherlands
- Province: Gelderland
- Municipality: Apeldoorn

Area
  - Village: 57.9 km^{2} (22.4 sq mi)
  - Urban: 0.9 km^{2} (0.35 sq mi)
- Elevation: 35 m (115 ft)

Population (1 January 2015)
  - Village: 2,927
  - Density: 50.6/km^{2} (131/sq mi)
  - Urban: 1,867
- Time zone: UTC+1 (CET)
  - Summer (DST): UTC+2 (CEST)
- Postcodes: 3888
- Area code: 0577

Uddel is a village in the Netherlands, on the Veluwe, in the municipality of Apeldoorn, Gelderland, Netherlands. Uddel is located on the N310 from Elburg to Arnhem. The oldest mention of Uddel dates back to the year 792, as the settlement Uttiloch. The village had 2,927 inhabitants in 2016.

Uddel is a conservative Protestant village, located on the Dutch Bible Belt. In the 2017 general election, 57 percent of the local population voted for the Reformed Political Party. The three Christian parties in the elections (the Reformed Political Party, the ChristianUnion and the Christian Democratic Appeal) had a combined total of almost 76 percent of the votes.

Uddel is well known for its lake, the Uddelermeer, with its unique geological formation. The lake is mentioned in the folk tale documented by van de Wall Perne in his book Veluwsche Sagen.

== Notable inhabitants ==
- Gerrit Holdijk (1944-2015), jurist and politician (SGP)
- Peter Boeve (1957), Dutch international footballer

== Gallery ==
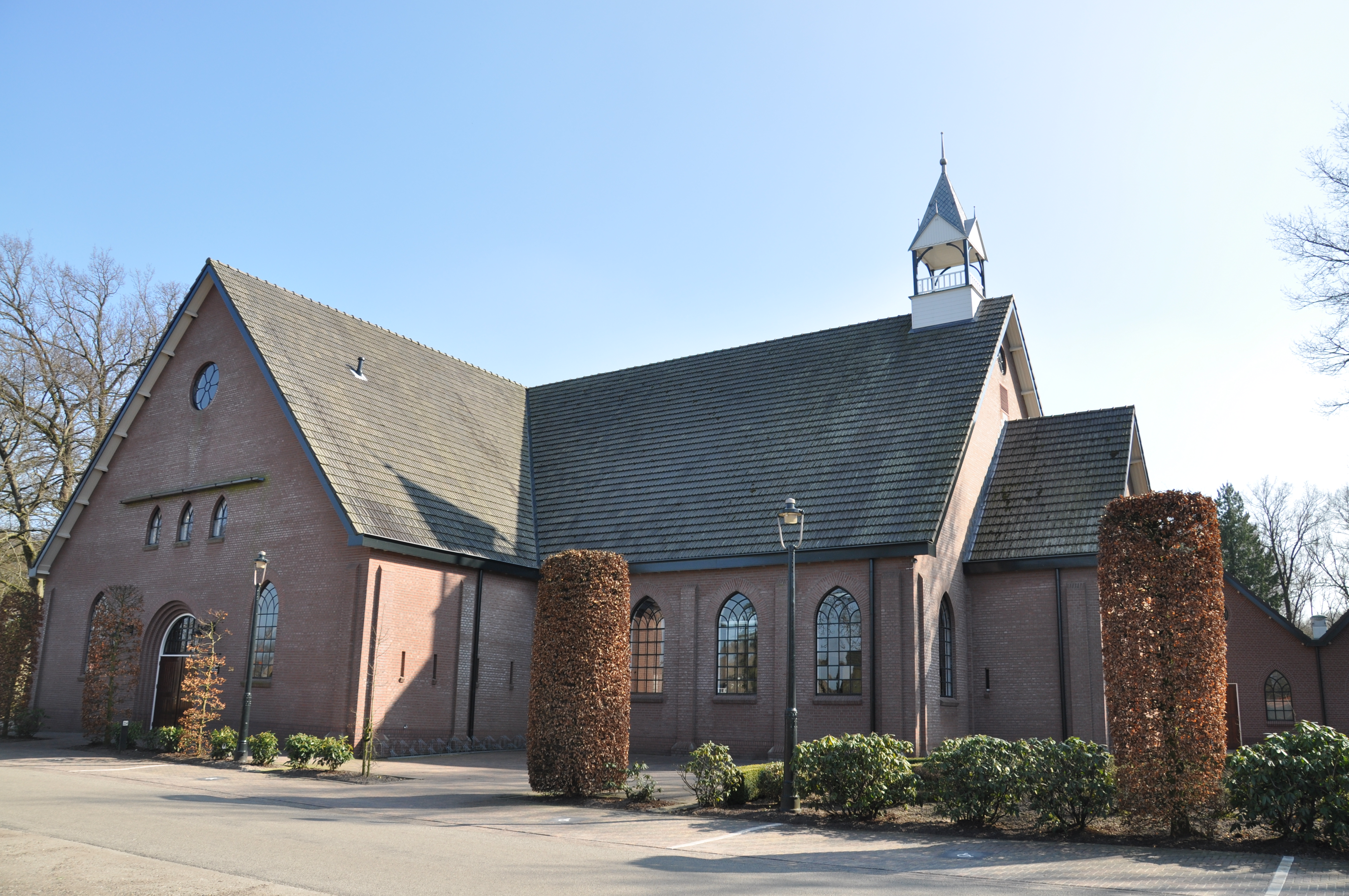
Reformed Congregation in the Netherlands De Beek-Uddel

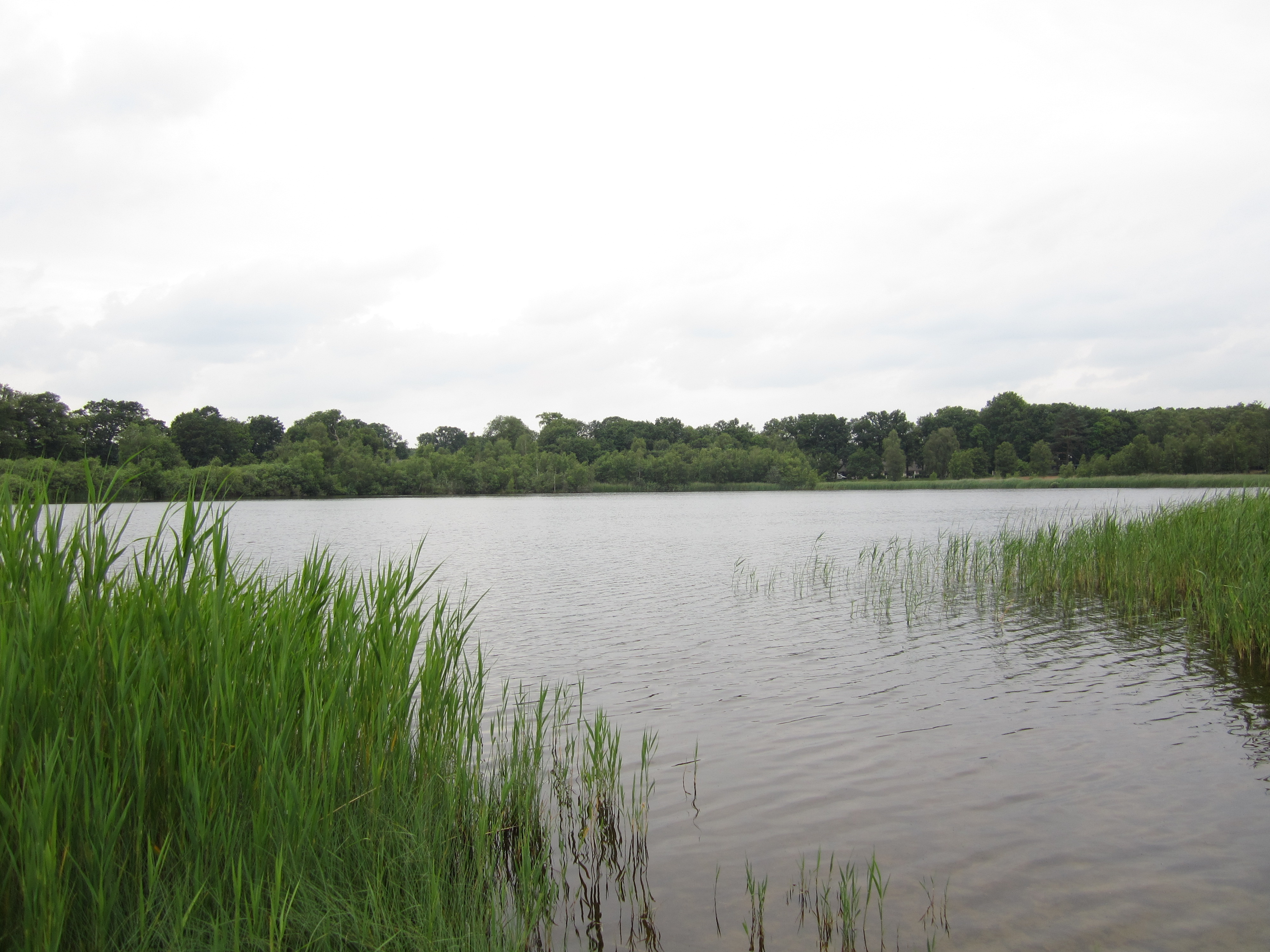
Uddelermeer

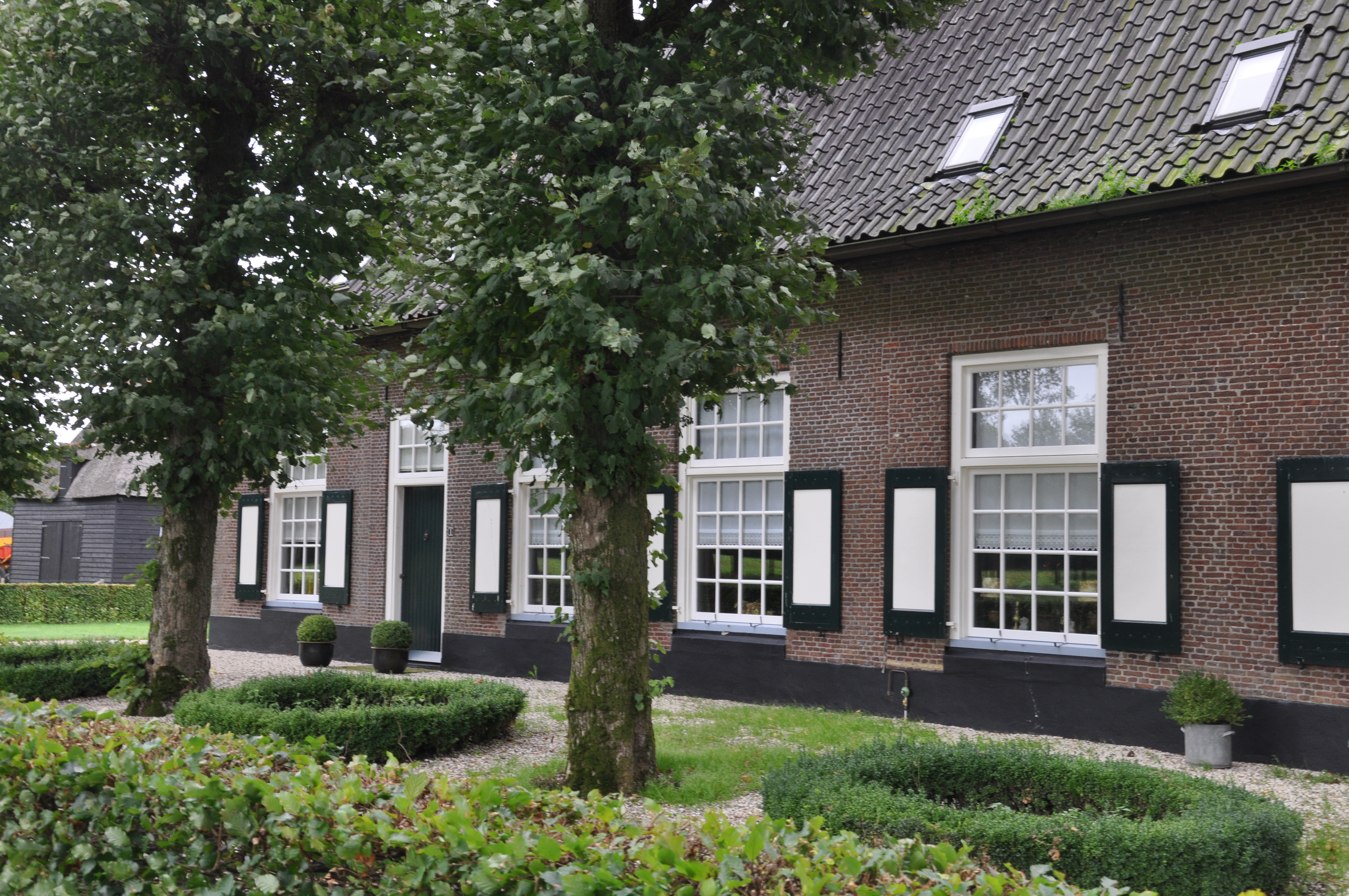
House in Uddel

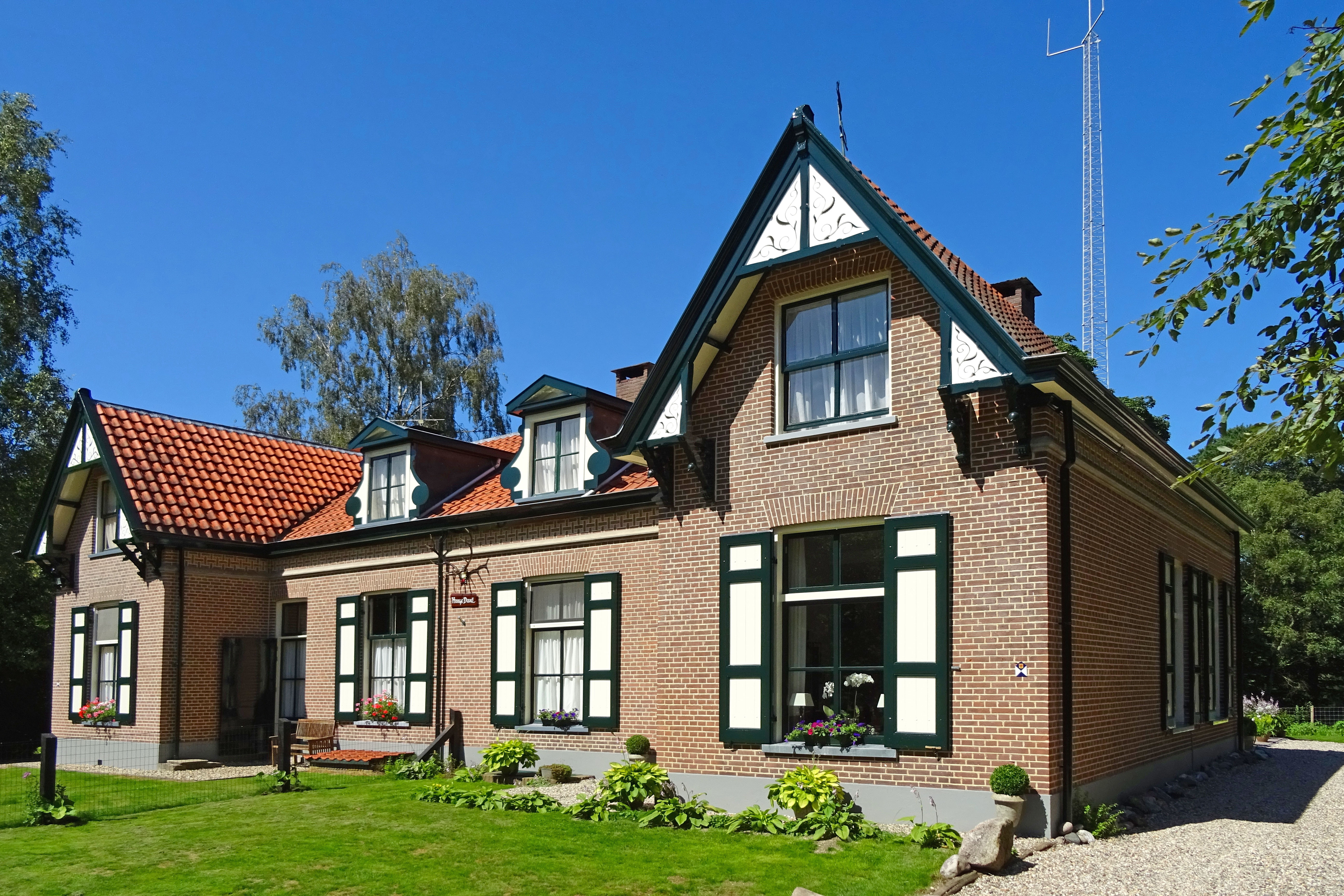
Game warden residence of the Crown domain
