= Arie Slob =

Dutch politician

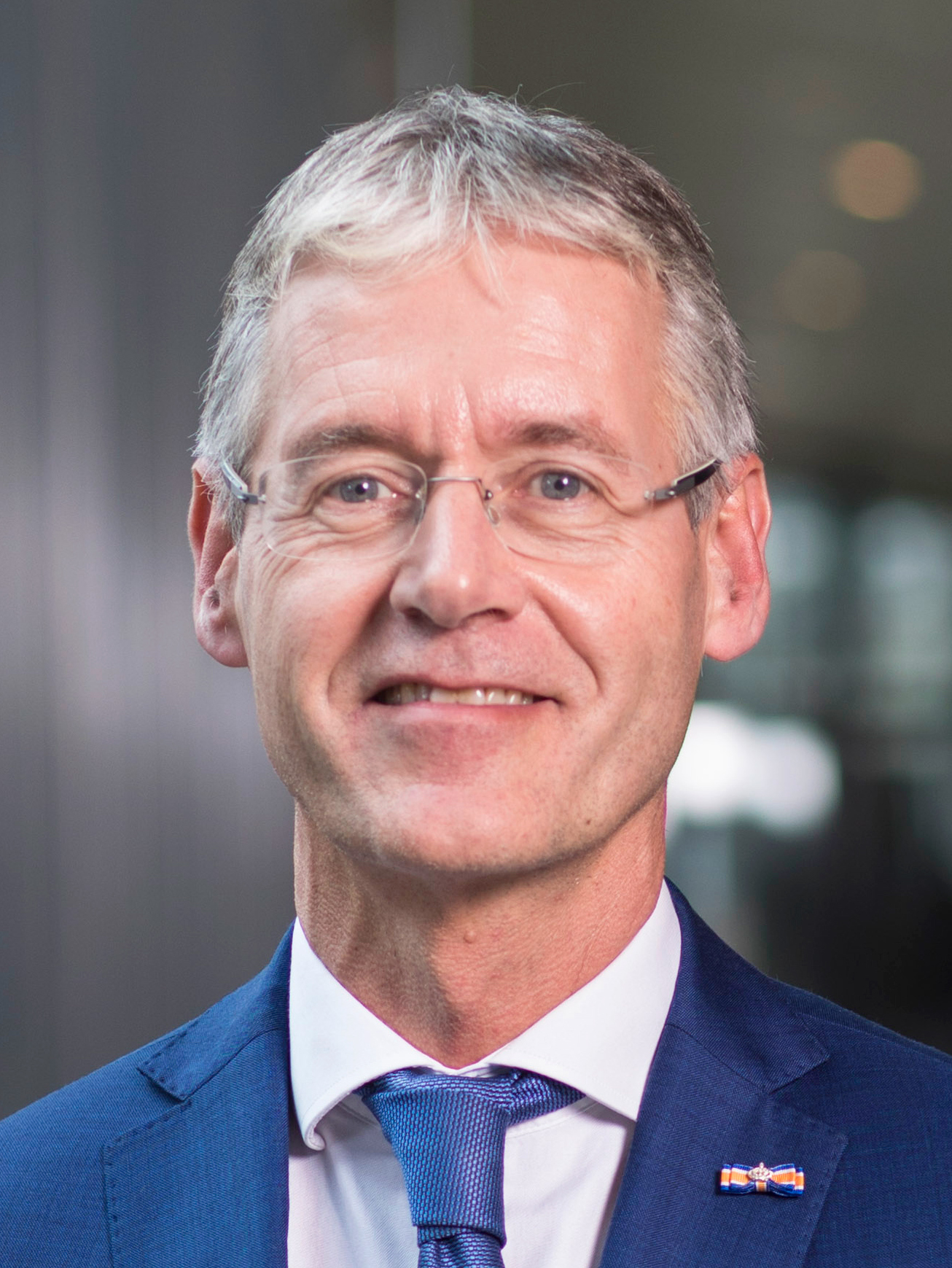
- Slob in 2017

Minister for Primary and Secondary Education and Media
- In office 26 October 2017 – 10 January 2022
- Prime Minister: Mark Rutte
- Preceded by: Office re-established
- Succeeded by: Dennis Wiersma

Leader of the Christian Union
- In office 28 April 2011 – 10 November 2015
- Preceded by: André Rouvoet
- Succeeded by: Gert-Jan Segers

Leader of the Christian Union in the House of Representatives
- In office 28 April 2011 – 10 November 2015
- Preceded by: André Rouvoet
- Succeeded by: Gert-Jan Segers
- In office 15 February 2007 – 10 June 2010
- Preceded by: André Rouvoet
- Succeeded by: André Rouvoet

Member of the House of Representatives
- In office 19 November 2002 – 1 December 2015
- In office 14 February 2001 – 23 May 2002

Personal details
- Born: 16 November 1961 (age 64) Nieuwerkerk aan den IJssel, Netherlands
- Party: Christian Union (since 2002)
- Other political affiliations: Reformed Political League (1987–2002)
- Spouse: Marjette Slob (m. 1986)
- Children: Esther, Aron, Lotte and Karen
- Education: University of Groningen (Bachelor of Arts, Master of Arts)
- Occupation: Politician · Teacher · Education administrator · Historian · Nonprofit director
- Website: (in English) Minister for Primary and Secondary Education and Media

Arie Slob (Dutch pronunciation: [ˈaːri ˈslɔp]; born 16 November 1961) is a Dutch politician and history teacher who served as Minister for Primary and Secondary Education and Media in the Third Rutte cabinet from 26 October 2017 until 10 January 2022.

A member of the Christian Union (CU), he was a member of the House of Representatives from 19 November 2002 until 1 December 2015. From 28 April 2011 to 10 November 2015, he was also party leader and parliamentary leader, in both positions succeeding André Rouvoet. He focused on matters of the Royal House, security, constitutional rights, infrastructure and fishery.

== Early political career ==
A native of Nieuwerkerk aan den IJssel, Slob studied history at the University of Groningen. He started his political career as a member of the municipal council of Zwolle from 1993 to 2001. In 2001, Slob became a member of the House of Representatives for the Reformed Political League (GPV) when its leader, Gert Schutte, retired. After the 2002 election, the newly formed Christian Union lost a seat and Slob did not return to Parliament. When Kars Veling, the party's lijsttrekker, stepped down as a result of the election loss, Slob took his place. He was put in second place on the list of Christian Union candidates for the 2003 election and was reelected.

== Leader of the Christian Union ==
After the 2006 general election, Slob and party lijsttrekker André Rouvoet represented the Christian Union in the negotiations for the formation of the new cabinet of the Netherlands, the Fourth Balkenende cabinet; Rouvoet was appointed Deputy Prime Minister of the Netherlands. Slob took his place as parliamentary leader. In 2011, when Rouvoet stepped down as party leader, Slob succeeded him.

As a member of the House of Representatives, he was also a member of the Temporary Committee on Infrastructural Projects.

== Minister for Primary and Secondary Education and Media ==
Slob retired from politics effective on 1 December 2015. He was invested as a Knight of the Order of Orange-Nassau on his departure from the House of Representatives. He was replaced by Eppo Bruins.

Slob was named director of the Historical Center Overijssel in Zwolle per 1 January 2016. On 26 October 2017, he was appointed Minister for Primary and Secondary Education and Media in Mark Rutte's third cabinet under the supervision of Education Minister Ingrid van Engelshoven.
