= Van der Jagt =

van der Jagt, Vander Jagt or Vanderjagt is a surname. Notable people with the surname include:

- Greg Vanderjagt (born 1984), Australian basketball player
- Guy Vander Jagt (1931–2007), American politician
- Jan van der Jagt (1924–2001), Dutch politician and architect
- Mike Vanderjagt (born 1970), Canadian gridiron football placekicker
