= Mirjam Bikker =

Dutch politician (born 1982)

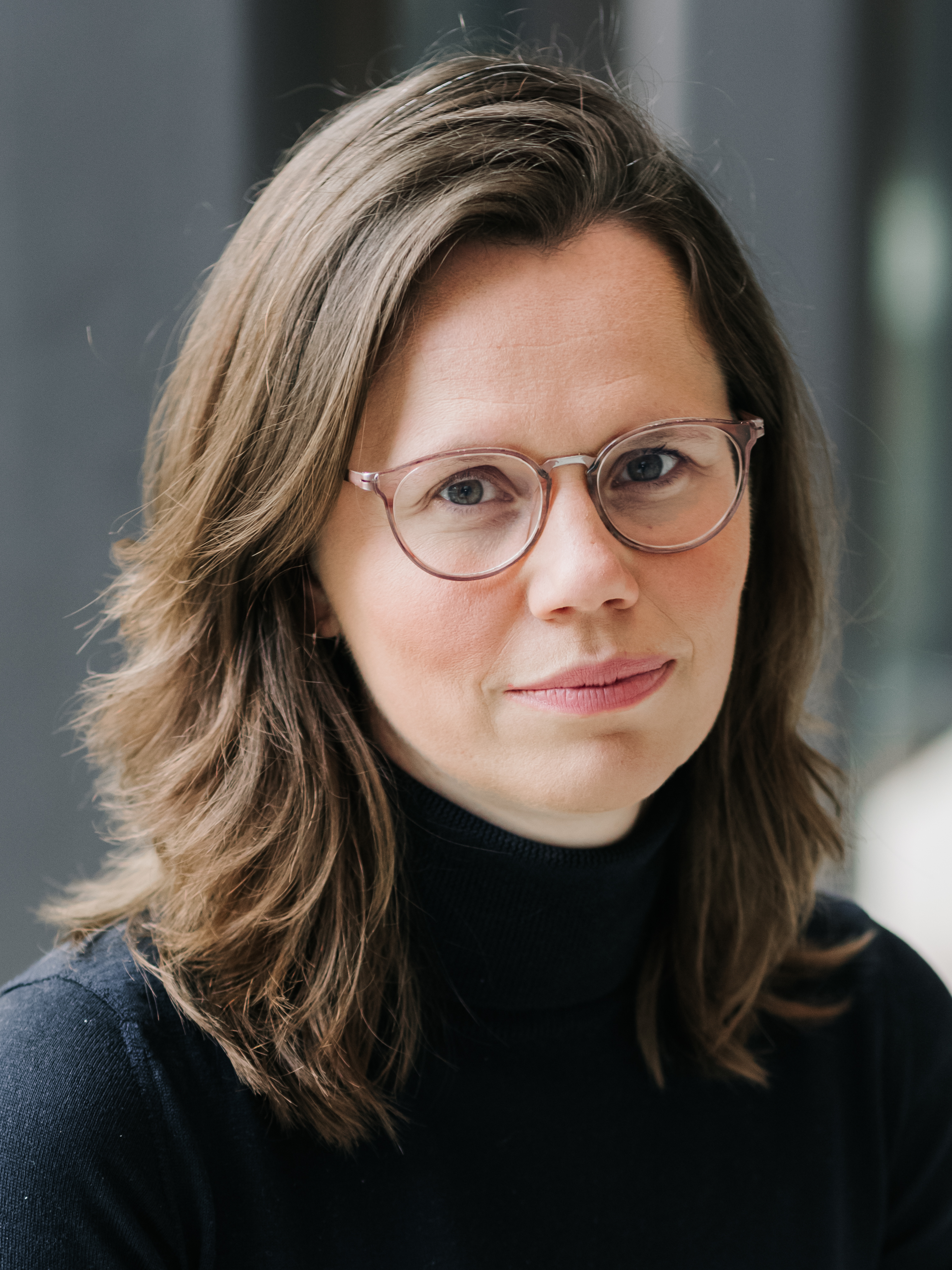
- Bikker in 2023

Leader of the Christian Union
- Incumbent
- Assumed office 17 January 2023
- Preceded by: Gert-Jan Segers

Member of the House of Representatives
- Incumbent
- Assumed office 31 March 2021

Leader of the Christian Union in the Senate
- In office 11 June 2019 – 31 March 2021
- Preceded by: Roel Kuiper
- Succeeded by: Tineke Huizinga

Senator of the Netherlands
- In office 22 December 2016 – 31 March 2021
- In office 9 June 2015 – 1 September 2016

Municipal councillor of Utrecht
- In office 16 March 2006 – 24 January 2013

Personal details
- Born: Mirjam Hannah Bikker; 8 September 1982 (age 43) Gouda, Netherlands
- Party: Christian Union
- Children: 3
- Education: Utrecht University (LLM)
- Occupation: Politician

Mirjam Hannah Bikker (born 8 September 1982) is a Dutch politician who has served as the leader of the Christian Union since January 2023. She is also a member of the House of Representatives since 2021. She was previously elected to the municipal council of Utrecht in 2006 and Senate in 2015.

== Biography ==
Bikker grew up in Moordrecht and Nunspeet; she attended her secondary education in Elburg. She studied law at Utrecht University and specialised in constitutional and administrative law. As a student she was also chairwoman of Sola Scriptura, a local student society belonging to the Reformed CSFR.

From 2006 to 2013, she was a member of the municipal council of the city of Utrecht, as well as also group chairwoman. In 2007, she received national attention by protesting against a woman in a golden bikini on a big poster in the centre of Utrecht. From 2008 to 2010 and again from 2013 to 2015, she was a policy assistant to the Christian Union group in the House of Representatives. In 2015, she joined the Senate. In 2019, she became group chairwoman, succeeding Roel Kuiper.

=== House of Representatives ===
In 2021, she was elected to the House of Representatives. She was mentioned as a potential minister in the formation phase of the Fourth Rutte cabinet. On 17 January 2023 Bikker became the leader of the Christian Union, becoming the first female leader of the party. She was re-elected to the House in November 2023. Next to her role as parliamentary leader, Bikker served as her party's spokesperson for health, welfare, sport, justice, security, the interior, Dutch royal family, and gas extraction in Groningen.

A motion by Bikker was passed in early 2024 compelling Minister Franc Weerwind to make a spending cap on online gambling more stringent, after the practice was legalized in 2021. Along with Michiel van Nispen (SP), she announced a bill with several measures to tackle online gambling issues, including a ban on advertisements and credit card payments and increased contributions from operators toward addiction prevention. Her party favored prohibiting online gambling, but such a proposal was unlikely to pass the House. Bikker also spoke out against antisemitism during the Gaza war. At Bikker's initiative, a statement was signed by most political parties speaking out against it, and a session about the topic was held at the prime minister's official residence amongst industry leaders. Along with Frans Timmermans of GroenLinks–PvdA, she carried forward a bill to impose harsher penalties in cases of hate crimes, including acts of violence or insults motivated by discrimination. It was passed by an overwhelming majority of the House in December 2024.

When the right-wing Schoof cabinet presented its 2025 budget that included €2 billion in education cuts, Bikker joined the self-named "unholy alliance" with centrist and conservative opposition parties. To gain support in the Senate, the governing coalition agreed in December 2024 to reverse €750 million of the cuts. Bikker did not embrace the revised budget, declaring that they had made "a bad budget less bad".

== Political positions ==
Bikker is in favor of stricter regulations on social media, and she wants to ban online gambling in order to improve mental health among young people. She supports the civilian service that was introduced in 2020.

== Personal life ==
Mirjam Bikker is married, has three children and lives in Gouda. She is a member of the Protestant Church in the Netherlands (PKN).

== Electoral history ==
Electoral history of Mirjam Bikker
Year	Body	Party	Pos.	Votes	Result		Ref.
Year	Body	Party	Pos.	Votes	Party seats	Individual	Ref.
2010	House of Representatives	Christian Union	19	297	5	Lost	
2012	House of Representatives	Christian Union	31	298	5	Lost	
2021	House of Representatives	Christian Union	3	8,519	5	Won	
2023	House of Representatives	Christian Union	1	158,057	3	Won	
2025	House of Representatives	Christian Union	1	157,021	3	Won	
