= Administration (government) =

Decision-making body

The term administration, as used in the context of government, differs according to the jurisdiction under which it operates. In general terms, the administration can be described as a decision-making body.

== United States ==
In American usage, the term generally refers to the executive branch under a specific president (or governor, mayor, or other local executives); or the term of a particular executive; for example: "President Y's administration" or "Secretary of Defense X during President Y's administration." It can also mean an executive branch agency headed by an administrator, as the National Aeronautics and Space Administration (NASA), Small Business Administration or the National Archives and Records Administration.

The term "administration" has been used to denote the executive branch in presidential systems of government.

== Europe ==
The term's usage in Europe varies by country. Still, most typically the word "administration" refers to managerial functions in general, which may include local governments, or the hierarchy of national and local government, that applies to a town or district. More specifically, it may refer to public administration, the business of administering public policy as determined by the government. However, outside France and Romania, this usage of the word is uncommon.

For the British sense of the word, most countries use the term government, referring to the "administration" of Winston Churchill as the "Churchill government". This is also true for the non-European members of the Commonwealth of Nations. An older, chiefly Commonwealth usage, is the term "ministry", as in "Churchill Ministry", which is still in official and academic use in Britain, Australia, and Canada to refer the terms of prime ministers.

The word coalition may be used for a specific government depending on the type of government. In the Netherlands, cabinet is the most-used term (as in "the fourth Balkenende cabinet"). However "coalition" or "government" are also used when one does not refer to a specific coalition (note that the two terms have slightly different meanings).

== See also ==
- Executive (government)
