= Frans Timmermans =

Dutch politician (born 1961)

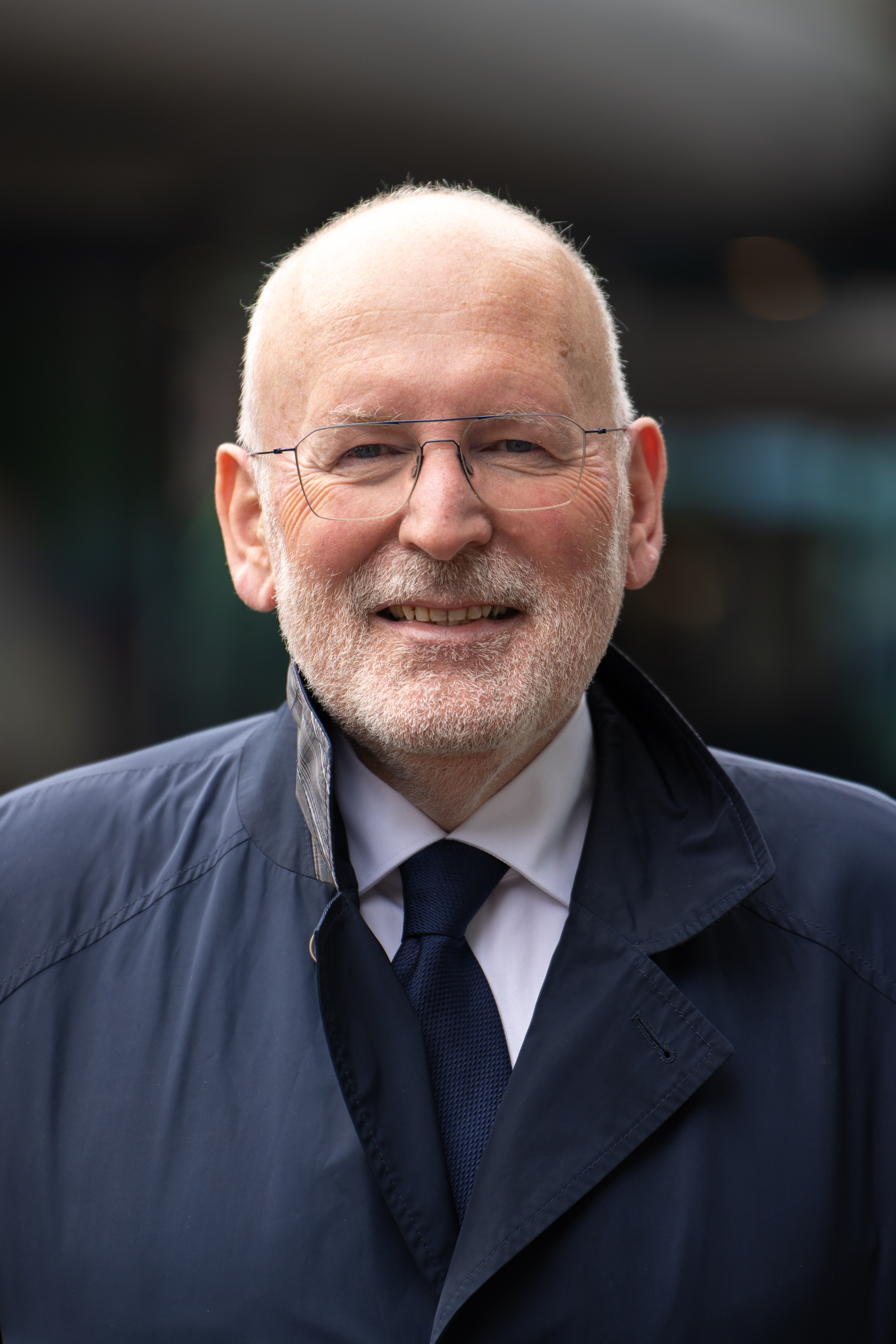
- Timmermans in 2025

Leader of GroenLinks–PvdA in the House of Representatives
- In office 6 December 2023 – 3 November 2025
- Preceded by: Office established
- Succeeded by: Jesse Klaver

Executive Vice President of the European Commission for the European Green Deal
- In office 1 December 2019 – 22 August 2023
- Commission: Von der Leyen I
- Preceded by: Position established
- Succeeded by: Maroš Šefčovič

European Commissioner for Climate Action
- In office 1 December 2019 – 22 August 2023
- Commission: Von der Leyen I
- Preceded by: Miguel Arias Cañete
- Succeeded by: Maroš Šefčovič (acting)

First Vice President of the European Commission
- In office 1 November 2014 – 30 November 2019
- Commission: Juncker
- Preceded by: Catherine Ashton
- Succeeded by: Position abolished

Minister of Foreign Affairs
- In office 5 November 2012 – 17 October 2014
- Prime Minister: Mark Rutte
- Preceded by: Uri Rosenthal
- Succeeded by: Bert Koenders

State Secretary for European Affairs
- In office 22 February 2007 – 23 February 2010
- Prime Minister: Jan Peter Balkenende
- Preceded by: Atzo Nicolaï
- Succeeded by: Ben Knapen

Member of the House of Representatives
- In office 6 December 2023 – 11 November 2025
- In office 9 June 2010 – 5 November 2012
- In office 6 May 1998 – 22 February 2007
House positions
Parliamentary leader of GroenLinks–PvdA
In office 6 December 2023 – 3 November 2025
Preceded by	Jesse Klaver
Succeeded by	Jesse Klaver

Personal details
- Born: Franciscus Cornelis Gerardus Maria Timmermans; 6 May 1961 (age 65) Maastricht, Netherlands
- Party: Labour (since 1990)
- Other political affiliations: Democrats 66 (1985)
- Spouse: Irene Timmermans (m. 2000)
- Children: 4
- Education: Radboud University (BA, MA); Nancy 2 University (LLM, MA)

Military service
- Allegiance: Netherlands
- Branch/service: Royal Netherlands Army
- Years of service: 1986–1987
- Unit: Military Intelligence and Security Service

Franciscus Cornelis Gerardus Maria Timmermans (Note: Dutch pronunciation: [frɑnˈsɪskʏs kɔrˈneːlɪs xeːˈrɑrdʏs frɑns ˈtɪmərˌmɑns]; In isolation, Gerardus is pronounced [ɣeːˈrɑrdʏs]) (born 6 May 1961) is a Dutch politician who was the leader of GroenLinks–PvdA in the House of Representatives from 2023 to 2025.

From 2019 to 2023, Timmermans was Executive Vice President of the European Commission for the European Green Deal and European Commissioner for Climate Action in the von der Leyen I Commission. Prior to that, he was First Vice-President under Jean-Claude Juncker (2014–2019), overseeing Better Regulation, Interinstitutional Relations, the Rule of Law, and the Charter of Fundamental Rights. He was also the Party of European Socialists’ lead candidate for the European Commission presidency in the 2019 European elections.

Before his roles in Brussels, Timmermans served as Dutch Minister of Foreign Affairs (2012–2014) in the Second Rutte cabinet and as State Secretary for European Affairs (2007–2010) in the Fourth Balkenende cabinet. He was a member of the House of Representatives for the Labour Party from 1998 to 2007 and again from 2010 to 2012. Earlier in his career, from 1987 to 1998, he worked as a diplomat in the Dutch foreign service.

Timmermans resigned from the European Commission in 2023 to lead the joint GroenLinks–PvdA alliance in the 2023 Dutch general election. The alliance emerged as the second-largest parliamentary group, with Timmermans now serving as its leader in the House of Representatives. After disappointing results at the 2025 general election, Timmermans announced his resignation as leader of the alliance.

== Early life and education ==
Timmermans was born on 6 May 1961 in Maastricht to a Roman Catholic family. His parents divorced during his childhood, after which his father was mostly absent because of his career as security officer at the Dutch foreign ministry. Timmermans attended elementary school in Sint-Stevens-Woluwe, Belgium, before attending, from 1972 to 1975, the private Saint George's English School in Rome. From 1975 until 1980, he attended the athenaeum Bernardinuscollege in Heerlen, where he settled.

In 1980, Timmermans enrolled at Radboud University Nijmegen, where he studied French language and literature and graduated with a Master of Arts degree in 1985. During his studies, in 1984, he also attended Nancy University in Nancy, France, where he pursued European law, history and French literature, earning both a Master of Laws in European Law and an additional MA degree in 1985.

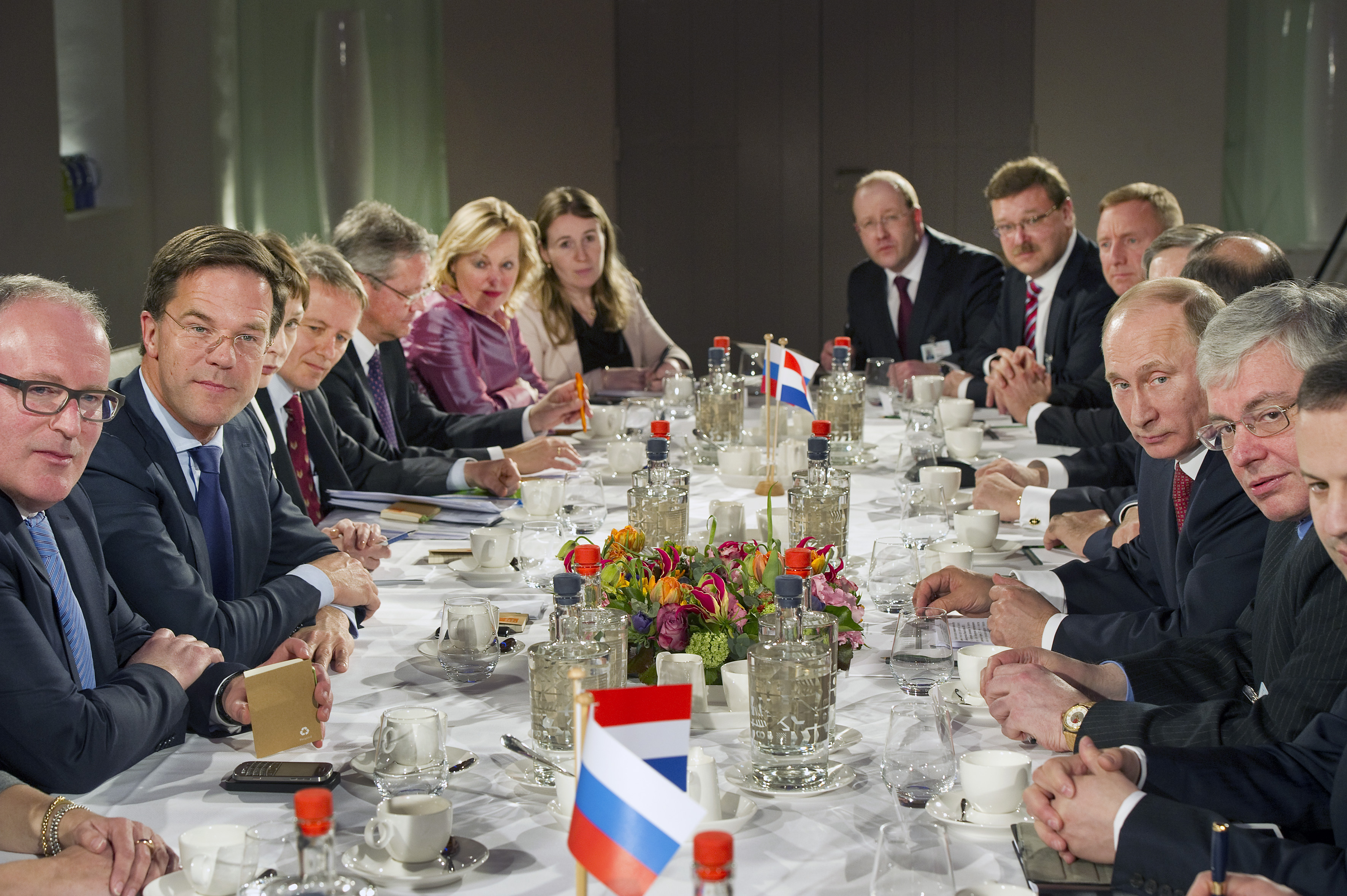
Timmermans with Dutch Prime Minister Mark Rutte and Russian President Vladimir Putin, 6 March 2013

== Diplomatic career ==
Timmermans completed his military service in the Royal Netherlands Army, where he served as a private first class and Russian POW interrogator with the Military Intelligence and Security Service, until his discharge in August 1987. Immediately thereafter, he joined the Ministry of Foreign Affairs as an Officer in the Integration Department, focusing on European cooperation and international affairs. In 1990, he was appointed Second Secretary at the Dutch Embassy in Moscow, where he served during a period of major political change following the dissolution of the Soviet Union. He returned to the Ministry of Foreign Affairs in 1993 as Deputy Head of the Bureau for European Development Cooperation, overseeing European aid and partnership programs.

In 1994, Timmermans left the ministry to work as Assistant to Hans van den Broek, the European Commissioner for External Relations at the time. A year later, he became Senior Advisor and Private Secretary to Max van der Stoel, then serving as the High Commissioner on National Minorities for the Organization for Security and Co-operation in Europe (OSCE), a position he held until entering national politics in 1998.

== Political career ==
=== Member of the House of Representatives (1998–2007) ===
After the 1998 Dutch general election, Timmermans was elected as a member of the House of Representatives for the Labour Party (PvdA). He was re‑elected following the 2002 and 2003 general elections, serving in the House until 2007. During his tenure, Timmermans held several committee leadership roles. From 2001 to 2002, he served as Deputy Chairman of the Committee on Foreign Affairs. He subsequently chaired the Committee on Economic Affairs from 2002 to 2003, after which he resumed his position as Deputy Chairman of the Committee on Foreign Affairs, a post he held until 2007.

In addition to his domestic parliamentary work, Timmermans represented the House of Representatives in the Convention on the Future of Europe from March 2002 to July 2003, contributing to the drafting of the proposed Treaty establishing a Constitution for Europe. He was also a member of the Parliamentary Assembly of the Council of Europe from 1998 to 2007.

=== State Secretary for European Affairs (2007–2010) ===
After the Dutch general election of 2006 the Labour Party, Christian Democratic Appeal (CDA) and the ChristianUnion (CU) formed a coalition agreement which resulted in the formation of the Cabinet Balkenende IV. Timmermans became Undersecretary for Foreign Affairs and was responsible for the co-ordination of government policy towards the European Union, and was conferred the diplomatic title of Minister of European Affairs during international visits. A major theme of his time as Undersecretary for European Affairs was to increase support for European integration. This was done both by seeking greater influence of citizens on European policies and by improving communication and public perception; besides citizens the aim was that education should have also been more involved with Europe. The Treaty of Lisbon was signed whilst he was Undersecretary, before which Timmermans and Prime Minister Jan Peter Balkenende successfully lobbied to secure a greater role for national parliaments in European Union decision-making processes. In February 2010, NATO officially requested the Netherlands to extend its military involvement in Task Force Uruzgan. The Labour Party strongly opposed the extension of the mission and on 23 February 2010 the Cabinet Balkenende IV fell after the Labour Party officially withdrew its support with all Labour Party Cabinet members resigning.

=== Return as a Member of the House of Representatives (2010–2012) ===
Following the withdrawal of the Labour Party from the coalition government, the Cabinet Balkenende IV remained as a Demissionary Cabinet until the Dutch general election of 2010. Following a coalition agreement between the People's Party for Freedom and Democracy (VVD), Christian Democratic Appeal (CDA) and the Party for Freedom (PVV), the Labour Party became the official opposition. Timmermans was returned to the House of Representatives, being installed on 17 June 2010. During his second term as a Member of the House of Representatives he served as Parliamentary Spokesman of the Labour Party for Foreign Affairs and European Affairs. Labour politician Ronald Plasterk accused Timmermans in 2016 of doing nothing for half a year in order to acquire this responsibility, which had initially been refused because of his previous office. He declined to comment.

=== Minister of Foreign Affairs (2012–2014) ===
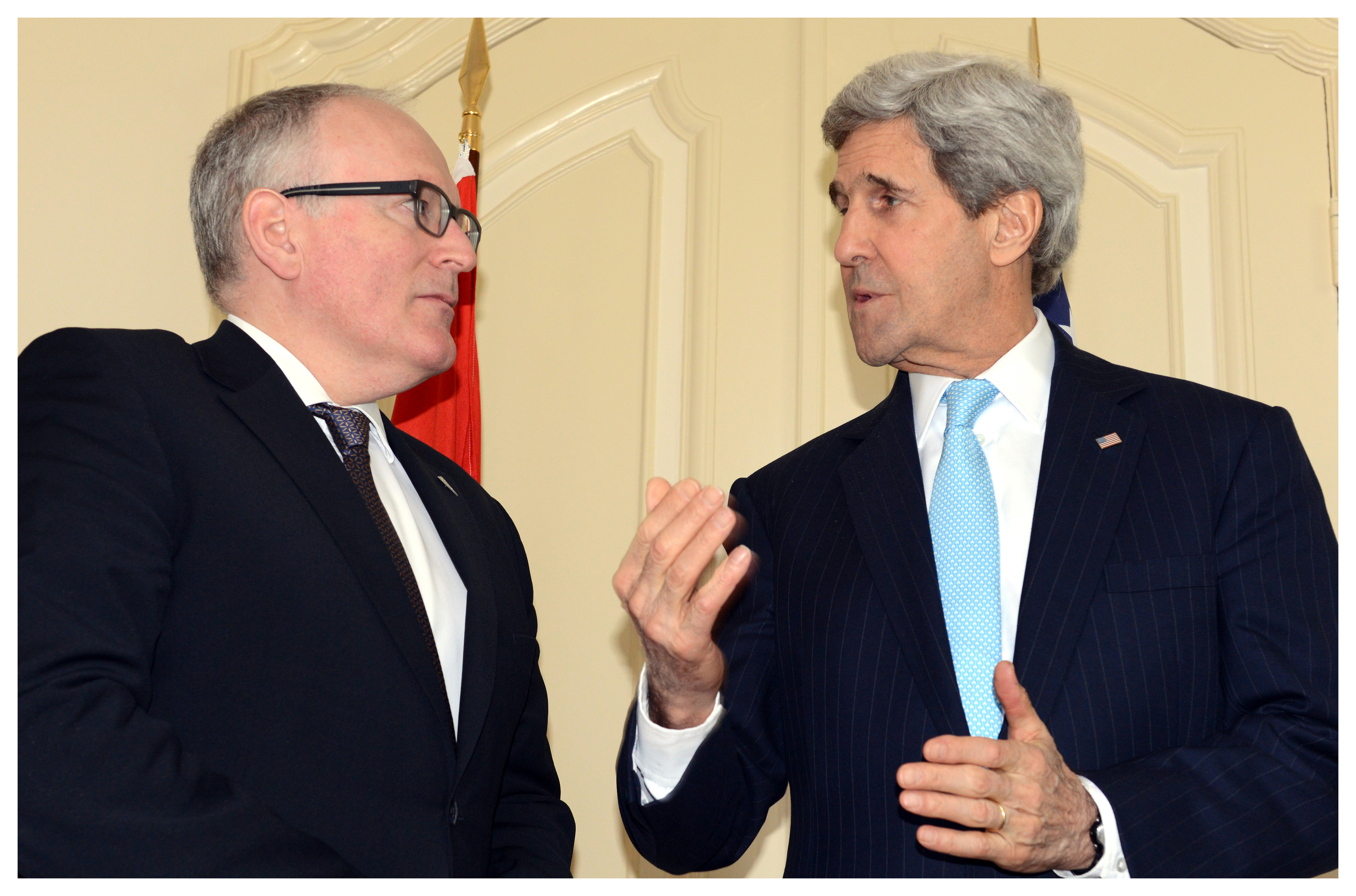
Timmermans with US Secretary of State John Kerry at the 2014 Nuclear Security Summit

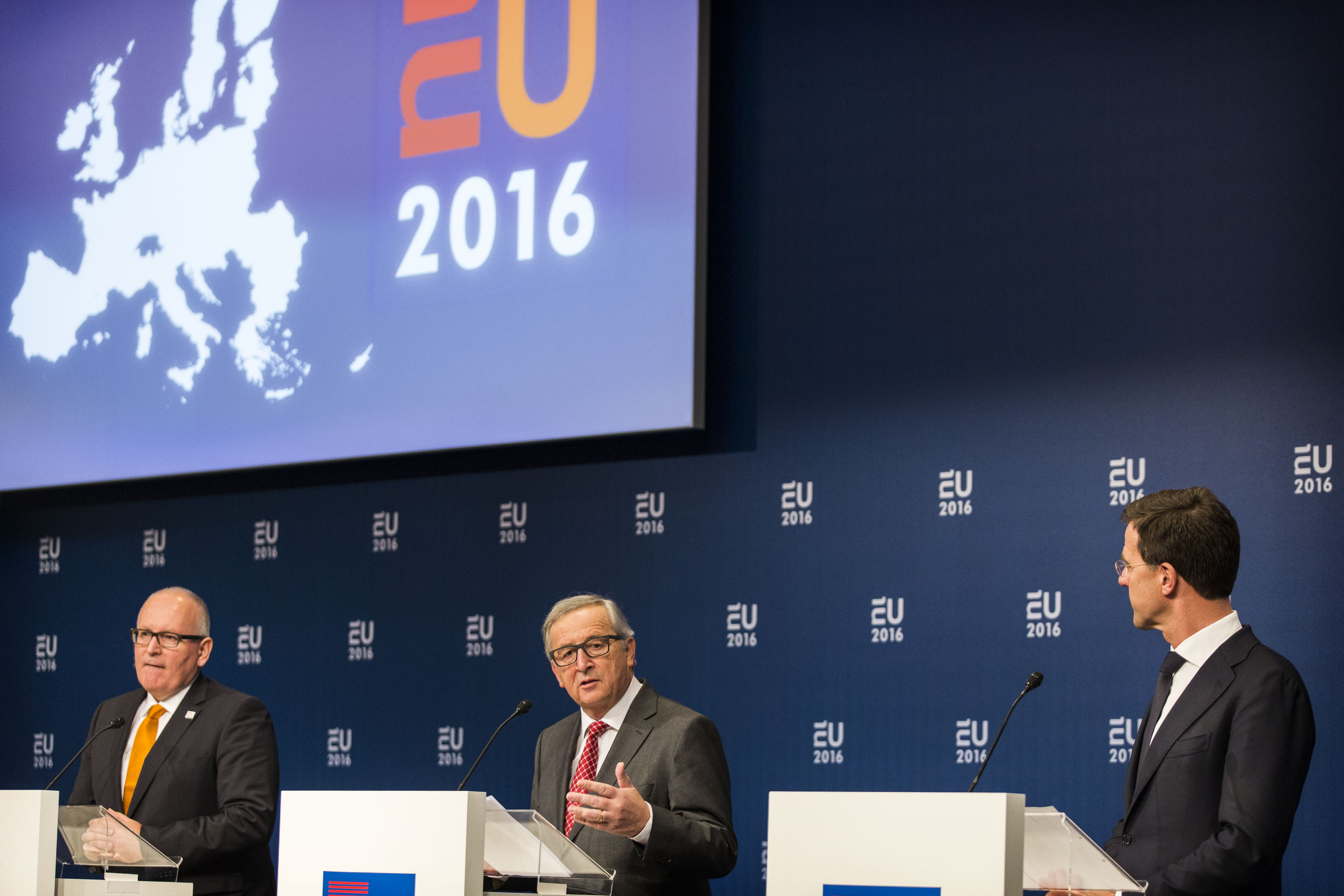
Timmermans with President of the European Commission Jean-Claude Juncker and Dutch Prime Minister Mark Rutte, 7 January 2016

After the fall of the first Rutte cabinet, the 2012 Dutch general election resulted in the Labour Party and the People's Party for Freedom and Democracy negotiating a coalition agreement which led to the formation of the second Rutte cabinet and Timmermans being appointed Minister of Foreign Affairs, taking office on 5 November 2012.

On 24 and 25 March 2014 the Netherlands hosted the 2014 Nuclear Security Summit, where Timmermans as Minister of Foreign Affairs was responsible for welcoming all attending representatives.

In May 2014, Timmermans condemned Geert Wilders' anti-Islam sticker, saying that "The Netherlands cannot be held responsible for the adolescent behaviour of a single parliamentarian." Timmermans said that Saudi Arabia is "deeply offended by the sticker action."

On 17 July 2014, passenger flight Malaysia Airlines Flight 17 was shot down over Ukraine resulting in the deaths of 194 Dutch citizens. The next day Timmermans flew to Kyiv to meet with President Petro Poroshenko and Prime Minister Arseniy Yatsenyuk to discuss the matter, following which, on 21 July 2014, Timmermans addressed the United Nations Security Council in New York. Timmermans delivered an emotional speech which was widely praised by the international community. His speech called for Dutch Prime Minister Rutte and the International Community to help bring the victims home and start an investigation to make sure that those responsible are brought to justice. He states: "I call on the international community, on the Security Council, on anyone with influence on the situation on the ground: allow us to bring the victims’ remains home to their loved ones without any further delay. They deserve to be home." A statement in his speech about the careless way with which the local population was said to have treated the bodies of the victims appeared to be imprecise. Timmermans acknowledged this later on in a letter to the Dutch parliament.

In August 2014, Timmermans called for an independent investigation into Israel's actions during the 2014 Israel–Gaza conflict.

In a speech at the Israel Council on Foreign Relations Timmermans explains the interconnectedness between Israel and Europe. These similarities, culture-wise and governmentally, mean that Europe holds Israel to a higher standard: namely, as a European country rather than a Middle Eastern country. While this double standard could be perceived as antisemitic, Timmermans points out that "there is no way we can disentangle the destiny of Israel from the destiny of Europe". In pointing out this connection, Timmermans alludes to the responsibility that Europe has to maintain positive relations with Israel. While recognizing how young people in Europe are facing "rising disenchantment" to democracy, he calls on the European community to "help us find new, innovative ways of translating this inherent human necessity to be heard, to influence one's environment to be part of the decision making process". He believes the Netherlands should help fortify security guarantees for Israel, but cautions that Israel must be willing to give Palestinians full and equal rights in the West Bank and in Gaza.

=== European Commission ===
==== Juncker Commission (2014–2019) ====
7 July 2016 speech to EU Parliament by Timmermans (5 1/2 min.)

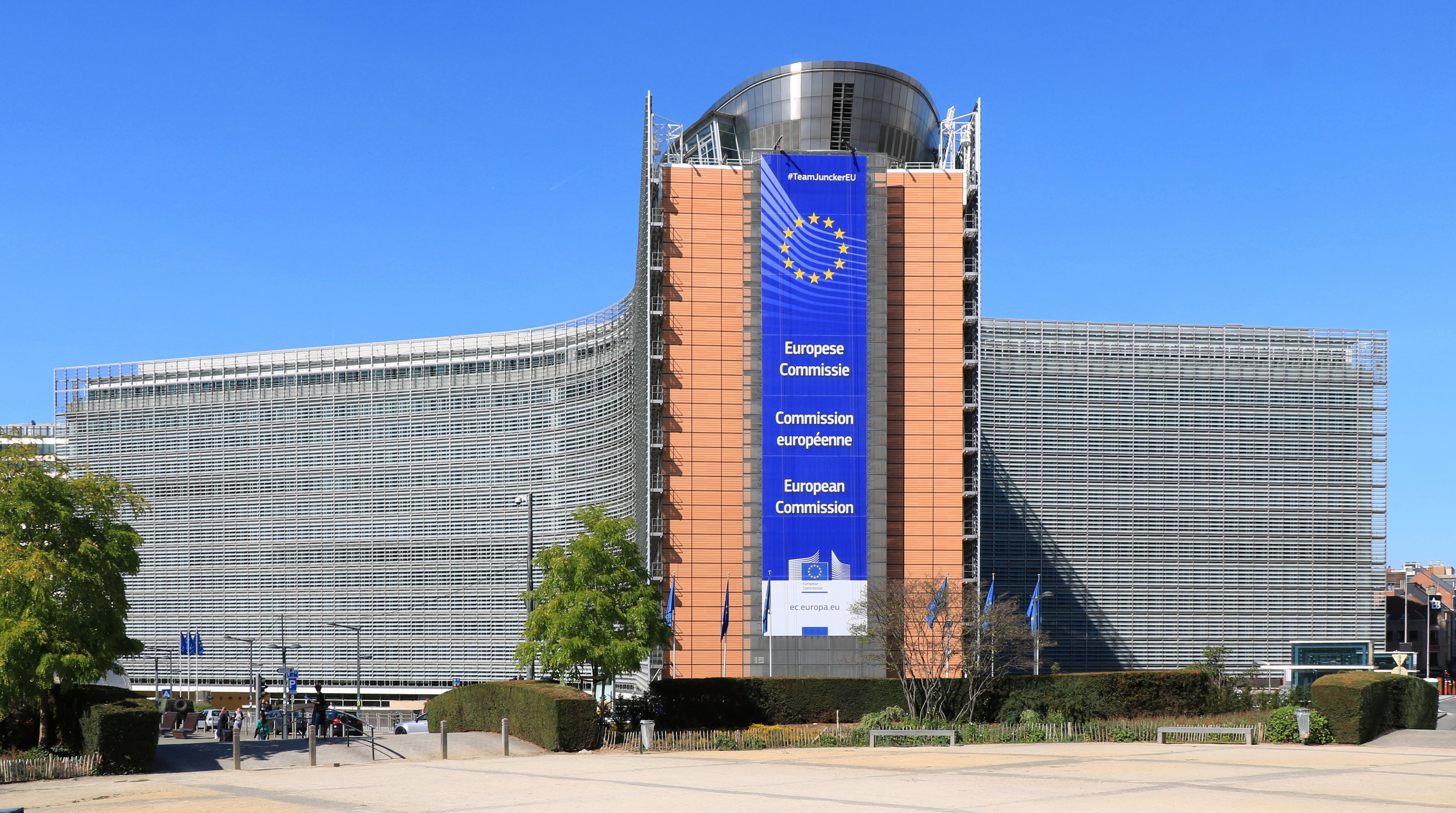
The European Commission, of which Frans Timmermans was a vice-president from 2014 through 2023

In September 2014, the Dutch Government nominated Frans Timmermans as its prospective member of the European Commission under President-elect Jean-Claude Juncker. On 1 November 2014, Timmermans took office as First Vice President in Juncker's European Commission, and served as President Juncker's first deputy and right-hand man. Timmermans' portfolio comprised Better Regulation, Inter-Institutional Relations, Rule of Law and Charter of Fundamental Rights.

In May 2016, Timmermans said that Erdoğan's Turkey "has made impressive progress, particularly in recent weeks, on meeting the benchmarks of its visa liberalisation roadmap. There is still work to be done as a matter of urgency but if Turkey sustains the progress made, they can meet the remaining benchmarks."

Timmermans repeatedly criticized Poland's judiciary reform, saying that "these laws considerably increase the systemic threats to the rule of law in Poland." In April 2019, the commission had launched a new infringement proceedings against Poland over independence of judges. Timmermans said: "The new disciplinary regime undermines the judicial independence of Polish judges by not offering necessary guarantees to protect them from political control, as required by the Court of Justice of the European Union."

Timmermans supported the mandatory migrant quotas within the EU. He said that people coming to the EU "are fellow human beings who, I think, deserve to seek refuge when they flee the barbarism that the jihadists are inflicting upon them."

==== Unsuccessful candidacy for the European Commission presidency ====
In October 2018, Frans Timmermans announced his candidacy for the office of President of the European Commission ahead of the 2019 European election. In December 2018, during the Congress of Lisbon, the Party of European Socialists acclaimed him as its candidate. He was formally nominated as the PES Common Candidate in Madrid in February 2019. Timmermans said he intended to challenge the dominance of the EPP by building a left coalition in the European Parliament. His party finished second in the election behind the EPP, but after having discussed the parliamentary lead candidates Manfred Weber, Timmermans and occasionally also Margrethe Vestager of the three largest European parties in the parliament several times, the European Council initially intended to nominate Timmermans for the office of commission president mostly because of Weber's alleged missing experience on the international stage. However, when governments from Eastern Europe protested this decision because of their strong opposition against Timmerman's fight on behalf of the commission for the rule of law and against reforms which are prospected to undermine it in these countries, the Council almost unanimously proposed German Defense Minister Ursula von der Leyen as a compromise candidate in July 2019, a controversial decision among many members of the European Parliament, as she had neither been running for the office nor taken part in the European election, while such a process had informally been agreed as the gold standard since 2014. Therefore, the sole abstention with her nomination came from Germany themselves because part of the German coalition government did not accept such a move. Yet, von der Leyen was subsequently elected with a narrow majority by the European Parliament, promised to argue for a better implementation and formalisation of the desired parliamentary process in the future and announced that lead candidates Timmermans and Vestager would become vice-presidents in her commission.

==== Von der Leyen Commission (2019–2023) ====
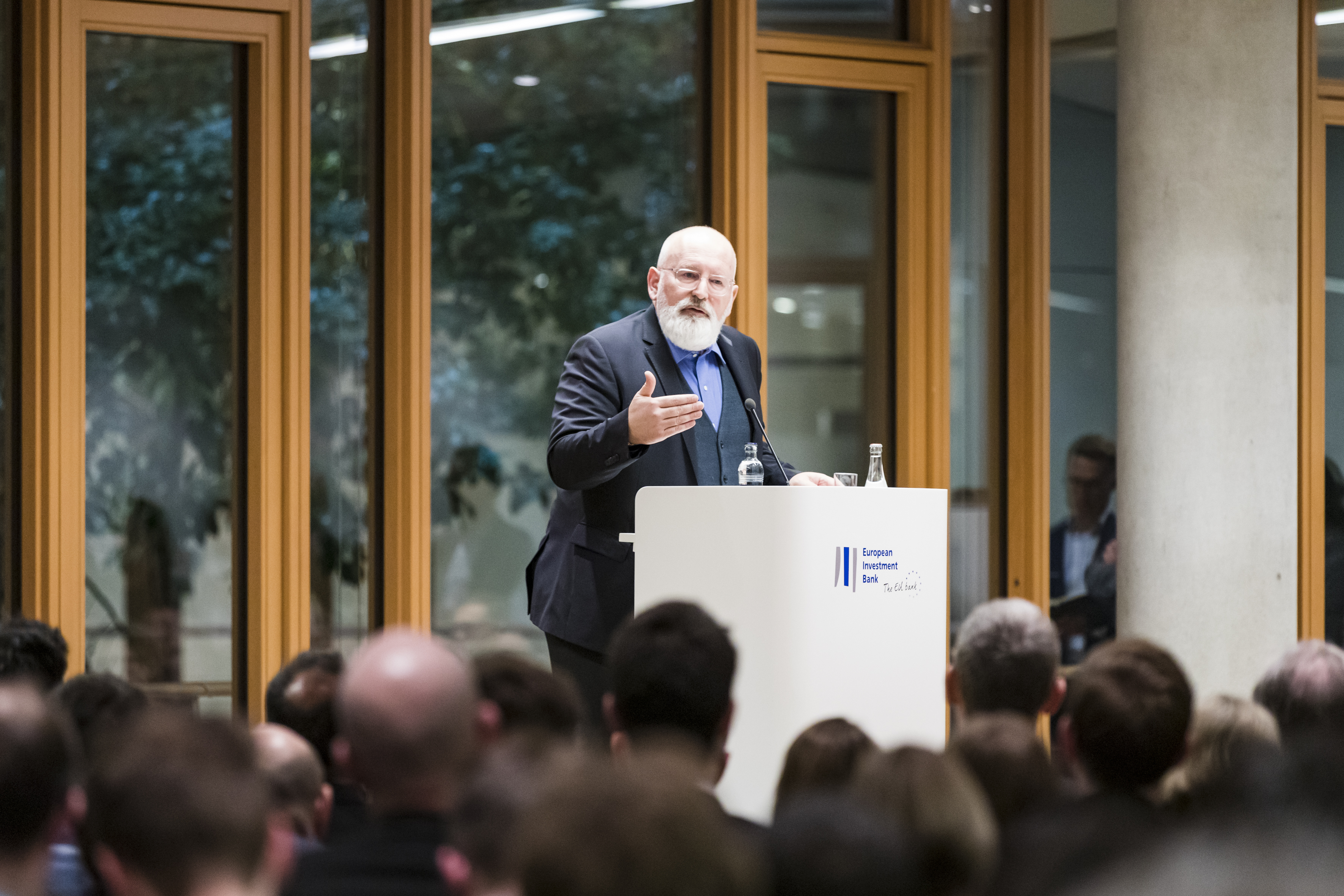
Timmermans delivering a speech about the Green Deal at the European Investment Bank Headquarters

In 2019, President of the European Commission, Ursula von der Leyen requested Frans Timmermans continue in his role as First Vice President while also designating him as one of the three new Executive Vice Presidents of the European Commission. As Executive Vice President, Timmermans was responsible for the European Green Deal. Timmermans was also responsible for a European Green Deal and a European Climate Law in their first hundred days in office.

On 30 March 2021, Timmermans said in a tweet after talking to Swedish environmental activist Greta Thunberg that "The Commission remains committed" to making the Common Agricultural Policy "fulfill the objectives" of the European Green Deal.

In October 2021, Timmermans suggested "the best answer" to the 2021 global energy crisis is "to reduce our reliance on fossil fuels." He said those blaming the European Green Deal were doing so "for perhaps ideological reasons or sometimes economic reasons in protecting their vested interests." Euractiv reported that Timmermans told the European Parliament in Strasbourg "that “about one fifth” of the energy price increase can be attributed to rising CO2 prices on the EU's carbon market."

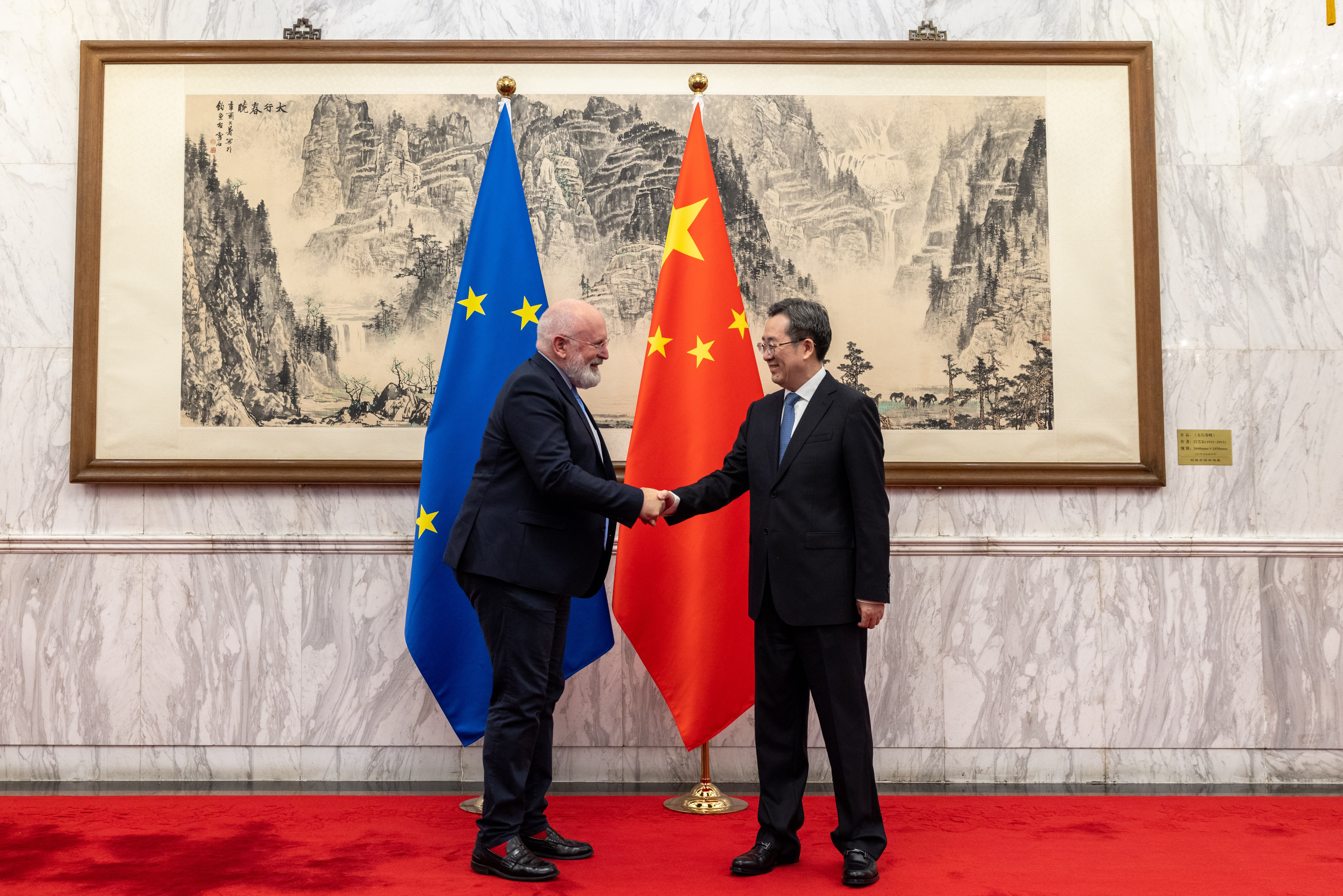
Timmermans with Chinese Vice Premier Ding Xuexiang in Beijing, 4 July 2023

In July 2023 China and the European Union held the Fourth EU-China High Level Environment and Climate Dialogue. The European delegation to China was led by Frans Timmermans. Both sides declared they will continue to cooperate in stopping climate change, biodiversity loss and pollution. Both sides agreed to ensure the success of COP28, implement the Kunming-Montreal Global Biodiversity Framework, advance the High Seas Treaty, cooperate in water policy, reach a global agreement on plastic pollution by 2024. Both sides also agreed to support circular economy.

=== GL-PvdA leader (2023–2025) ===
In July 2023, a snap election was called in the Netherlands after the collapse of the fourth Rutte cabinet. After members of the Labour Party and GroenLinks voted to contest the election on a joint list, Timmermans declared his intention to become lead candidate (lijsttrekker) for the alliance and to succeed Mark Rutte as Prime Minister of the Netherlands. His candidacy was met with widespread approval from both parties, including Labour Party leader Attje Kuiken and GroenLinks leader Jesse Klaver. On 22 August 2023, during a joint GroenLinks–PvdA party meeting, Timmermans was confirmed as lead candidate with 92 percent of the vote. He resigned from the European Commission on the same day, and was replaced in his role as Executive Vice-President for the European Green Deal by fellow vice president Maroš Šefčovič.

The 2023 Dutch general election was held on 22 November 2023, and GL–PvdA ultimately finished in second place, with 25 seats, behind Geert Wilders' anti-immigration Party for Freedom (PVV). Timmermans ruled out working with the PVV, remarking that "we will never form a coalition with parties that pretend that asylum seekers are the source of all misery". He was sworn into the House of Representatives on 6 December, and he has been serving as the parliamentary leader of GL–PvdA since. Along with Mirjam Bikker of the Christian Union, Timmermans carried forward a bill to impose harsher penalties in cases of hate crimes, including acts of violence or insults motivated by discrimination. It was passed by an overwhelming majority of the House in December 2024.

After the fall of the Schoof cabinet, Timmermans was elected on 20 June 2025 to lead another joint GL–PvdA list for the snap elections in October 2025. He was the only candidate for the position and received 78.7% of the votes by members of the parties. After an exit poll projected that GL–PvdA would lose five seats compared to the 2023 election, Timmermans announced his resignation as party leader. He received the honorary title of Minister of State in July 2026.

== Personal life ==
Timmermans has married twice, having two children in his first marriage, a daughter (born 1986) and a son (born 1989). Timmermans remarried in 2000 to Irene Timmermans; he and his second wife have a son (born 2004) and a daughter (born 2006). After returning from Brussels in 2023, he moved back to his birthplace of Maastricht. He is a fan of AS Roma. Timmermans has talked about his struggle with morbid obesity in interviews. He said that he had his weight under control until around 2015, after which he was no longer able to control his eating behaviour. His condition remained manageable under the assistance of medical specialists and medicine, but it deteriorated following his 2023 move back to the Netherlands. In October 2024, he underwent gastric bypass surgery.

In 2021, he appeared on the Time 100, Time's annual list of the 100 most influential people in the world and was named one of the 28 most influential people in Europe (in the "Doers" category) by Politico Europe.

Aside from his native Dutch and Limburgish, Timmermans is fluent in English, French, German, Italian and Russian.

== Honours and decorations ==
=== Decorations ===
- Commander of the Order For Merit (Romania, 2006)
- Officer of the Order of Merit of the Republic of Poland (Poland, 2006)
- Knight of the Legion of Honour (France, 2007)
- Grand Cross of the Order of the Southern Cross (Brazil, 2008)
- 1st Class of the Order of the Cross of Terra Mariana (Estonia, 2008)
- Grand Cross of the Order of the Lithuanian Grand Duke Gediminas (Lithuania, 2008)
- Commander of the Order of the Polar Star (Sweden, 2009)
- Grand Cross of the Order of Merit (Chile, 2009)
- Knight of the Order of Orange-Nassau (Netherlands, 2010)
- Golden Palm Decoration of Honour (Bulgaria, 2018)

=== Honorary degrees ===
- On 16 January 2015, Timmermans was awarded an honorary doctorate from the Faculty of Arts and Social Sciences of Maastricht University.
- On 11 March 2019, he was awarded the title doctor honoris causa by National University of Political Studies and Public Administration (SNSPA) in Bucharest, Romania.
- On 10 September 2021, Frans Timmermans was awarded the title doctor honoris causa by University of Salamanca in Salamanca, Spain.
- On 14 January 2022, Timmermans was awarded an honorary doctorate by Delft University of Technology for his efforts to put climate issues on the agenda.

== Electoral history ==
Electoral history of Frans Timmermans
Year	Body	Party	Pos.	Votes	Result		Ref.
Year	Body	Party	Pos.	Votes	Party seats	Individual	Ref.
1998	House of Representatives	Labour Party	18	7,561	45	Won	
2002	House of Representatives	Labour Party	19	4,780	23	Won	
2003	House of Representatives	Labour Party	19	7,786	42	Won	
2006	House of Representatives	Labour Party	11	6,599	33	Won	
2010	House of Representatives	Labour Party	9	8,684	30	Won	
2012	House of Representatives	Labour Party	8	15,150	38	Won	
2019	European Parliament	Labour Party	1	839,240	6	Won	
2023	House of Representatives	GroenLinks–PvdA	1	760,521	25	Won	
2025	House of Representatives	GroenLinks–PvdA	1	519,850	20	Won (Note: Timmermans declined his seat.)	

== See also ==
- Climate change mitigation

== Notes ==
Political offices
Preceded by Uri Rosenthal	Minister of Foreign Affairs; 2012–2014	Succeeded by Bert Koenders
Preceded by Neelie Kroes	Dutch European Commissioner; 2014–2023	Succeeded by TBD
Preceded by Cathy Ashton	First Vice President of the European Commission; 2014–2019	Office abolished
Preceded by Maroš Šefčovič as European Commissioner for Inter-Institutional Relations and Administration	European Commissioner for Better Regulation, Inter-Institutional Relations-European Climate Commission, Rule of Law and Charter of Fundamental Rights; 2014–2019	
Preceded by Martine Reicherts as European Commissioner for Justice, Fundamental Rights and Citizenship	European Commissioner for Better Regulation, Inter-Institutional Relations-European Climate Commission, Rule of Law and Charter of Fundamental Rights; 2014–2019	
New office	Executive Vice President of the European Commission for the European Green Deal; 2019–2023	Succeeded by Maroš Šefčovič; Acting
Preceded by Miguel Arias Cañete	European Commissioner for Climate Action; 2019–2023	Succeeded by Maroš Šefčovič; Acting
