= Leader of the Christian Union =

Christian Union

The Leader of the Christian Union is the most senior politician within the Christian Union (Dutch: ChristenUnie, CU) in the Netherlands. The post is currently held by Mirjam Bikker, who succeeded Gert-Jan Segers in 2023.

== History ==
The leaders outwardly act as the 'figurehead' and the main representative of the party. Within the party, they must ensure political consensus. At election time the leader is always the lead candidate of the party list. Outside election time the leader can serve as the opposition leader. In the Christian Union the leader is often the parliamentary leader in the House of Representatives. One Christian Union leader became a Minister in a cabinet.

Leader		Term of office	Age as leader	Position(s)	Religion	Lead candidate
	Kars Veling (1948–2025)	23 January 2001 – 12 November 2002 (1 year, 293 days)^{[Removed]}	52–54	Member of the Senate (1991–2002); Parliamentary leader in the Senate (1991–1999); Member of the House of Representatives (2002); Parliamentary leader in the House of Representatives (2002)	Reformed; Churches; Liberated	2002
André Rouvoet	André Rouvoet (born 1962)	12 November 2002 – 28 April 2011 (8 years, 167 days)^{[Retired]}	40–49	Member of the House of Representatives (1994–2007, 2010–2011); Parliamentary leader in the House of Representatives (2002–2007, 2010–2011); Minister without Portfolio (2007–2010); Deputy Prime Minister (2007–2010); Minister of Education, Culture and Science (2010)	Christian; Reformed; Churches	2003; 2006; 2010
Arie Slob	Arie Slob (born 1961)	28 April 2011 – 10 November 2015 (4 years, 196 days)^{[Retired]}	49–53	Member of the Municipal council of Zwolle (1993–2001); Member of the House of Representatives (2001–2002, 2002–2015); Parliamentary leader in the House of Representatives (2007–2010, 2011–2015); Minister without Portfolio (2017–2022)	Reformed; Churches; Liberated	2012
Gert-Jan Segers	Gert-Jan Segers (born 1969)	10 November 2015 – 17 January 2023 (7 years, 68 days)^{[Retired]}	46–53	Member of the House of Representatives (2012–2023); Parliamentary leader in the House of Representatives (2015–2023)	Protestant; Church	2017; 2021
Mirjam Bikker	Mirjam Bikker (born 1982)	17 January 2023 – Incumbent (2 years, 208 days)	40–42	Member of the Municipal council of Utrecht (2006–2013); Member of the Senate (2015–2016, 2016–2021); Parliamentary leader in the Senate (2019–2021); Member of the House of Representatives (since 2021); Parliamentary leader in the House of Representatives (since 2023)	Protestant; Church (Reformed; Association)	2023; 2025
