= Gert-Jan Segers =

Dutch politician

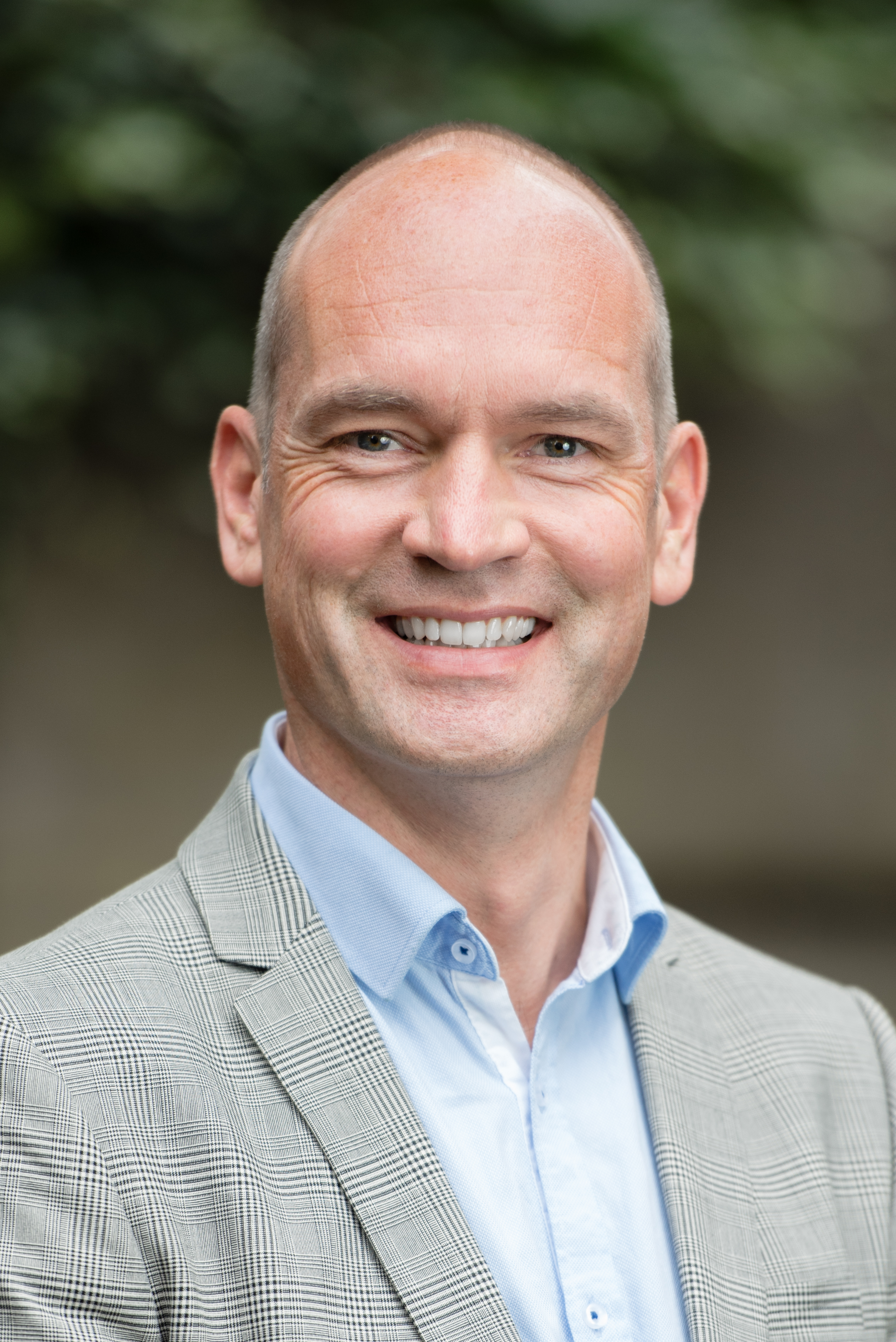
- Segers in 2016

Leader of the Christian Union
- In office 10 November 2015 – 17 January 2023
- Preceded by: Arie Slob
- Succeeded by: Mirjam Bikker

Leader of the Christian Union in the House of Representatives
- In office 10 November 2015 – 17 January 2023
- Preceded by: Arie Slob
- Succeeded by: Mirjam Bikker

Member of the House of Representatives
- In office 20 September 2012 – 20 January 2023

Personal details
- Born: 9 July 1969 (age 57) Lisse, Netherlands
- Party: Christian Union
- Other political affiliations: Reformatory Political Federation (until 2001)
- Relations: Married
- Children: 3
- Education: Leiden University (BSc, MSc); Johns Hopkins University (MIPP)

Gert Jan Maarten "Gert-Jan" Segers (born 9 July 1969) is a Dutch politician who was Leader of the Christian Union between 2015 and 2023. He has been a member of the House of Representatives between 2012 and 2023 and was parliamentary leader between 2015 and 2023.

== Early career ==
A native of Lisse, Segers studied political science at Leiden University and obtained a master's degree in Western–Islamic relations and the Middle East at Johns Hopkins University. From 2000 to 2007 he was a Christian missionary in Egypt. From 2008 to 2012, he was the chairman of the Christian Union think tank Mr. G. Groen van Prinsterer Stichting. He is also a columnist for the Dutch newspaper Nederlands Dagblad; he wrote two books criticising political Islam, as well as two novels.

== Politics ==
Segers entered the House of Representatives following the 2012 general election. In 2015, he succeeded Arie Slob as party leader and parliamentary leader. In the 2017 general election, the Christian Union remained stable with five seats. Prime Minister Mark Rutte first turned toward GroenLinks to form his third cabinet, but policy disagreement between the parties prevented participation. Rutte then turned toward the Christian Union, who accepted the offer to govern: two Christian Union members were appointed (Carola Schouten and Arie Slob).

On 13 January 2023, Segers announced his resignation as leader of the Christian Union. He was succeeded by Mirjam Bikker on 17 January.

== Personal ==
Gert-Jan Segers is married and has three children. Theo Segers, the former mayor of Staphorst and current mayor of Molenlanden, is his cousin.
