= André Rouvoet =

Dutch politician (born 1962)

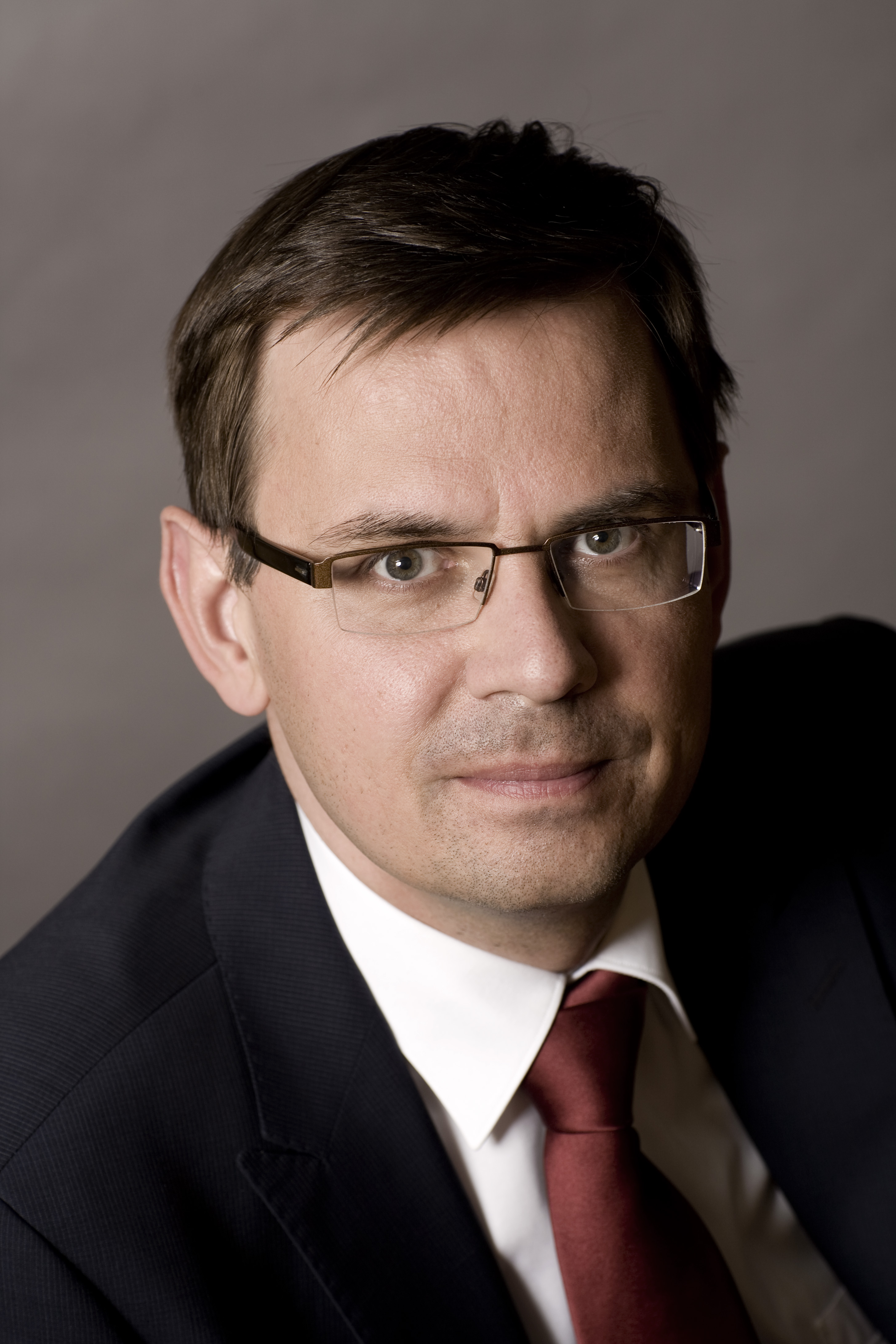
- Rouvoet in 2009

Minister of Education, Culture and Science
- In office 23 February 2010 – 14 October 2010
- Prime Minister: Jan Peter Balkenende
- Preceded by: Ronald Plasterk
- Succeeded by: Marja van Bijsterveldt

Deputy Prime Minister of the Netherlands
- In office 22 February 2007 – 14 October 2010 Serving with Wouter Bos (2007–2010)
- Prime Minister: Jan Peter Balkenende
- Preceded by: Gerrit Zalm
- Succeeded by: Maxime Verhagen

Minister for Youth and Family Policy
- In office 22 February 2007 – 14 October 2010
- Prime Minister: Jan Peter Balkenende
- Preceded by: Office established
- Succeeded by: Office discontinued

Leader of the Christian Union
- In office 12 November 2002 – 28 April 2011
- Deputy: Arie Slob (2003–2011)
- Preceded by: Kars Veling
- Succeeded by: Arie Slob

Parliamentary leader in the House of Representatives
- In office 17 June 2010 – 28 April 2011
- Preceded by: Arie Slob
- Succeeded by: Arie Slob
- In office 12 November 2002 – 22 February 2007
- Preceded by: Kars Veling
- Succeeded by: Arie Slob
- Parliamentary group: Christian Union

Member of the House of Representatives
- In office 17 June 2010 – 19 May 2011
- Succeeded by: Carola Schouten
- In office 17 May 1994 – 22 February 2007
- Parliamentary group: Christian Union (2002–2011); Reformatory Political Federation (1994–2002)

Personal details
- Born: André Rouvoet; 4 January 1962 (age 64) Hilversum, Netherlands
- Party: Christian Union (from 2002)
- Other political affiliations: Reformatory Political Federation (1985–2002)
- Spouse: Liesbeth Rouvoet (m. 1986)
- Children: 4 daughters and 1 son
- Education: Free University Amsterdam (Bachelor of Laws, Master of Laws)
- Occupation: Politician · Civil servant · Jurist · Researcher · Nonprofit director · Trade association executive · Political consultant · Teacher · Author

André Rouvoet (Dutch pronunciation: [ˈɑndreː ˈrʌuvut]; born 4 January 1962) is a retired Dutch politician of the Reformatory Political Federation (RPF) party and later the Christian Union (CU) party and jurist. He is the chairman of the executive board of the Healthcare Insurance association (ZN) since 1 February 2012.

Rouvoet applied at the Free University Amsterdam in June 1982 majoring in Philosophy of law and obtaining a Bachelor of Laws degree in July 1984 and worked as a student researcher before graduating with a Master of Laws degree in July 1986. Rouvoet worked as a political consultant for the Reformatory Political Federation (RPF) from September 1986 until November 1987 and for the Marnix van St. Aldegonde Foundation from November 1987 until May 1994 as a researcher from November 1987 until January 1989 and as director from January 1989 until May 1994. Rouvoet also worked as a political science teacher at an Evangelical School for Journalism in Amersfoort from September 1989 until July 1993. Rouvoet was elected as a Member of the House of Representatives after the election of 1994, taking office on 17 May 1994. On 22 January 2000 the Reformatory Political Federation and the Reformed Political League (GVP) choose to merge in a political alliance to form the Christian Union. Member of the Senate Kars Veling of the Reformed Political League was choose as the first Leader of the Christian Union and became the Lijsttrekker (top candidate) of the Christian Union for the election of 2002. The Christian Union had 5 seats in the House of House of Representatives previously held by the Reformed Political League and the Reformatory Political Federation and suffered a small loss, losing 1 seat and now had 4 seats in the House of Representatives with Veling being partially blamed for the defeat. Veling took responsibility for the defeat and subsequently announced his retirement from national politics and that he was stepping down as Leader and Parliamentary leader of the Christian Union in the House of House of Representatives in November 2002. Rouvoet soon thereafter announced his candidacy for the Christian Union leadership and won unopposed and succeeded Veling as Leader and Parliamentary leader in the House of House of Representatives on 12 November 2002.

For the election of 2003 Rouvoet served as Lijsttrekker of the Christian Union. The Christian Union suffered a small loss, losing 1 seat and now had 3 seats in the House of Representatives. For the election of 2006 Rouvoet served again as Lijsttrekker. The Christian Union made a win, gaining 3 seats and now had 6 seats in the House of Representatives. The following cabinet formation of 2006-2007 resulted in a coalition agreement between the Christian Union, the Christian Democratic Appeal (CDA) and the Labour Party (PvdA) which formed the Cabinet Balkenende IV with Rouvoet appointed as Deputy Prime Minister and Minister for Youth and Family Policy, taking office on 22 February 2007. The Cabinet Balkenende IV fell on 20 February 2010 and continued to serve in a demissionary capacity with Rouvoet appointed as Minister of Education, Culture and Science following the resignation Ronald Plasterk dual serving in both positions, taking office on 23 February 2010. For the election of 2010 Rouvoet served for a third and last time as Lijsttrekker. The Christian Union suffered a small loss, losing 1 seat and now had 5 seats in the House of Representatives. Rouvoet subsequently returned as a Member of the House of Representatives and as Parliamentary leader in the House of Representatives, taking office on 17 June 2010. The Cabinet Balkenende IV was replaced by the Cabinet Rutte I on 14 October 2010. On 28 April 2011 Rouvoet unexpectedly announced his retirement from national politics and that he was stepping down as Leader and Parliamentary leader in the House of House of Representatives and was succeeded by his long serving Deputy Arie Slob but retained his seat in the House of Representatives and continued to serve as a backbencher until his resignation on 19 May 2011.

Rouvoet retired from active politic and became active in the public sector and occupies numerous seats as a nonprofit director on several boards of directors and supervisory boards (International Red Cross and Red Crescent Movement Netherlands, Present Foundation, Bartiméus Fonds and STUDIO'van De Balie) and served on several state commissions and councils on behalf of the government (Divorce Challenge Comité and the Youth-care Abuse Investigation). On 24 October 2011 Rouvoet was nominated as chairman of the executive board of the Healthcare Insurance association (ZN) serving since 1 February 2012.

== Biography ==
=== Early life ===
Rouvoet was born in Hilversum. After attending a Protestant primary school in Hilversum, Rouvoet continued at a Protestant gymnasium, specializing in humanities until 1980. In 1981 he began to study law at the Vrije Universiteit of Amsterdam where he received his LL.M. degree in philosophy of law in 1986. During his study he became assistant to the Reformatory Political Federation party. He also was chairperson of the Reformatory Political Federation branch in Hilversum and later in Maarssen.

Between 1986 and 1987 he combined working for the Foundation of Schools of Protestant Christian Children's Homes, and an assistantship at the RPF parliamentary party. After that he became an employee and later director (in 1989) of the Marnix van St. Aldegonde Foundation, the scientific foundation linked to the RPF, as such he was member of the committee on the party's election manifesto for 1989 elections. During this period he also taught political science at the Evangelical School for Journalism in Amersfoort.

=== Politics ===
In the Dutch general election of 1994 Rouvoet was heavily involved in the programmatic preparation of the election. He was editor of the party's election manifesto and the party's manifesto of principals. Rouvoet was also a candidate in these elections. The RPF won considerably and Rouvoet was elected to the House of Representatives. He immediately became secretary of the RPF political party. Rouvoet was member of the parliamentary research committee on the IRT affair, which involved failures in a criminal investigation unit. In 1997 he was made fellow of the Marnix van Sint Aldegonde Foundation.

After the Dutch general election of 1998 Rouvoet became a member of the presidium of the House of Representatives. In 2000 Rouvoet published the book "Politics with a Heart. a reflection on politics and morality". In 2001 the RPF united with another Protestant-Christian party, the Reformed Political League, to become the ChristianUnion. When its parliamentary party was formed Rouvoet became secretary of the parliamentary party. After the unexpected Dutch general election of 2002, Rouvoet became party leader of the ChristianUnion. He led the party in the Dutch general election of 2003, which also ended in defeat.

In 2005 Rouvoet's star rose as his party, together with the Pim Fortuyn List, Geert Wilders and the Socialist Party, opposed the European Constitution in the 2005 referendum. This proposal was subsequently rejected by the Dutch electorate, three days after the French had turned it down.

As a member of parliament, Rouvoet served as spokesperson for Justice, Finance, Health, Antillian and European Affairs. He was particularly involved in the debate on moral values and norms, which was initiated by Prime Minister Jan Peter Balkenende.

In 2007 he became Minister of Youth and Family and deputy prime minister of the Netherlands. As minister he was responsible for Youth, Children and Family affairs. His post was one of the two newly formed 'programme ministers'. His office was housed at the Ministry of Health, Welfare and Sport, but civil servants of other departments also worked directly for the programme ministry. The ministry had a budget of its own, among which were the child benefits and youth care budget.

Rouvoet in 2003 received the Johan Rudolph Thorbecke award for eloquence and was elected "Politician of the Year 2004" by the parliamentary press.

== Personal ==
Rouvoet is married to Liesbeth Rouvoet, a medical doctor; they have been married since 1986 and have 4 daughters and 1 son. He lives in Woerden and is a member of the Christian Reformed Churches. His hobbies include snooker.

== Decorations ==
Honours
Ribbon bar	Honour	Country	Date	Comment
	Officer of the Order of Orange-Nassau	Netherlands	3 December 2010	

Party political offices
Preceded by Kars Veling	Leader of the Christian Union; 2002–2011	Succeeded by Arie Slob
Preceded by Kars Veling	Parliamentary leader of the Christian Union in the House of Representatives; 2002–2007; 2010–2011	Succeeded by Arie Slob
Preceded by Arie Slob	Parliamentary leader of the Christian Union in the House of Representatives; 2002–2007; 2010–2011	Succeeded by Arie Slob
Preceded by Kars Veling; 2002	Lijsttrekker of the Christian Union; 2003 • 2006 • 2010	Succeeded by Arie Slob; 2012
Political offices
Preceded by Gerrit Zalm	Deputy Prime Minister; 2007–2010; Served alongside: Wouter Bos (2007–2010)	Succeeded by Maxime Verhagen
Preceded by Office established	Minister for Youth and Family Policy; 2007–2010	Succeeded by Office discontinued
Preceded by Ronald Plasterk	Minister of Education, Culture and Science; 2010	Succeeded by Marja van Bijsterveldt
Business positions
Preceded by Hans Wiegel	Chairman of the Executive Board of the Healthcare Insurance association 2012–present	Incumbent
