= Kars Veling =

Dutch politician and philosopher (1948–2025)

Leader of the Christian Union in the House of Representatives
- In office 23 May 2002 – 12 November 2002
- Preceded by: Leen van Dijke
- Succeeded by: André Rouvoet

Member of the House of Representatives
- In office 23 May 2002 – 12 November 2002

Leader of the Christian Union
- In office 17 January 2001 – 12 November 2002
- Preceded by: Office established
- Succeeded by: André Rouvoet

Member of the Senate
- In office 11 June 1991 – 15 May 2002

Leader of the Reformed Political League in the Senate
- In office 11 June 1991 – 8 June 1999
- Preceded by: Jan van der Jagt
- Succeeded by: Egbert Schuurman

Personal details
- Born: 30 June 1948 Groningen, Netherlands
- Died: 13 August 2025 (aged 77) Nijkerk, Netherlands
- Party: Christian Union (from 2002)
- Other political affiliations: Reformed Political League (1970–2002)
- Education: University of Groningen
- Occupation: Politician · Theologian · Philosopher · Historian · Researcher · Author · Activist · Nonprofit director · Academic administrator · Professor

Kars Veling (30 June 1948 – 13 August 2025) was a Dutch politician and philosopher. A member of the Reformed Political League (GPV) and later Christian Union (CU), he served as Leader of the Christian Union from 2001 to 2002.

== Education ==
Veling followed the HBS-B education in Groningen, the town where he was born. After finishing the HBS, he studied mathematics, physics and astronomy at the University of Groningen, where he received his candidate exam (comparable with a bachelor's degree). After that he studied philosophy and promoted at the faculty of social sciences of the University of Leiden in 1982.

== Career ==
After finishing his study in Groningen in 1969, Veling started as a teacher in mathematics for five years in Groningen. From 1972 until 1987 he taught philosophy at the Gereformeerde Sociale Academie (Reformed Social Academy) in Zwolle. He was vice-director of that academy from 1974 until 1980. He was also lector at the theological Kampen Theological University of the Reformed Churches (Liberated) from 1972 until 1987, when he became special professor at the same university (dissertation: Methodologie en de grondslagen van een pluriforme sociologie (methodology and the foundations of a pluriform sociology)).

In 1988 Veling became vice-rector of the reformed high school-group Prof.dr. S. Greijdanus in Zwolle for seven years. From 11 June 1991 until 12 November 2002 Veling was member of the Dutch Parliament. Until 16 May 2002 he was member of the First Chamber (Senate) of the Parliament, the rest of the time member of the Second Chamber and president of the fraction of the Christen Union. First, Veling represented the GPV in the parliament, and after the merger with the RPF he was fraction president of the joint fraction of GPV and RPF and after the May 2002 elections the Christen Union.

After his party lost the elections of November 2002, Veling stepped down from politics, and returned in June 2003 to education. He became rector of the Johan de Witt College school group in The Hague.

== Death ==
Veling died in Nijkerk on 13 August 2025, at the age of 77.

== Decorations ==
Honours
Ribbon bar	Honour	Country	Date	Comment
	Officer of the Order of Orange-Nassau	Netherlands	30 June 2016	Elevated from Knight (12 November 2002)

Party political offices
Preceded by Jan van der Jagt	Parliamentary leader of the Reformed Political League in the Senate; 1991–1999	Succeeded by Egbert Schuurman
New political party	Lead candidate of the Christian Union; 2002	Succeeded by André Rouvoet; 2003
New political party	Leader of the Christian Union; 2001–2002	Succeeded by André Rouvoet
Preceded by Leen van Dijke	Parliamentary leader of the Christian Union in the House of Representatives; 2002	Succeeded by André Rouvoet
Non-profit organization positions
Unknown	Executive Director of ProDemos; 2011–2016	Succeeded by Eddy Habben Jansen
