= Fourth Balkenende cabinet =

Cabinet of the Netherlands, 2007 to 2010

- Cabinet of the Netherlands

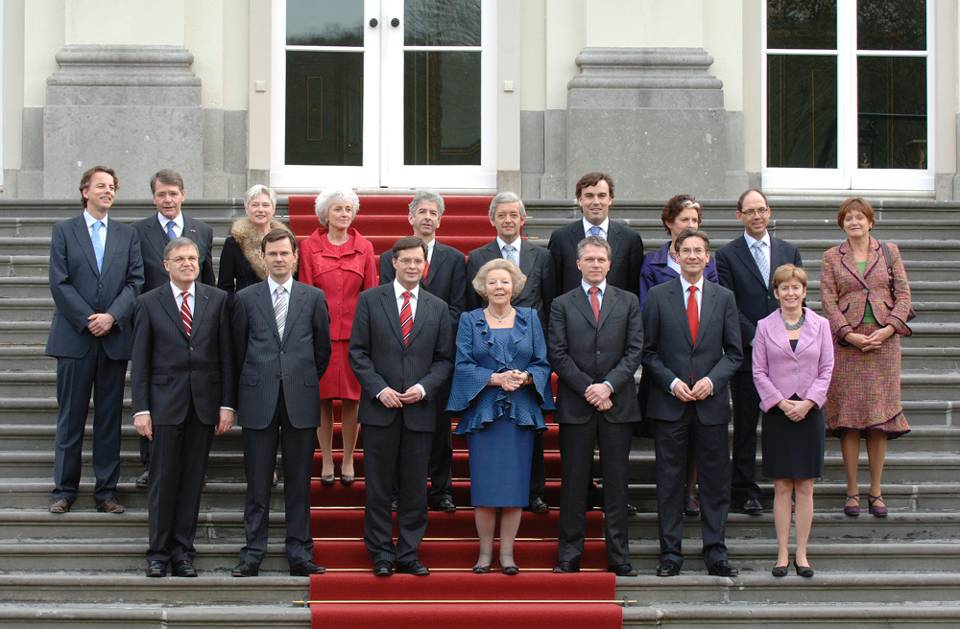
- The installation of the fourth Balkenende cabinet on 22 February 2007
- Date formed: 22 February 2007
- Date dissolved: 14 October 2010; 3 years, 234 days in office (demissionary from 20 February 2010)

People and organisations
- Head of state: Queen Beatrix
- Head of government: Jan Peter Balkenende
- Deputy head of government: Wouter Bos; André Rouvoet
- No. of ministers: 16
- Ministers removed: 7
- Total no. of members: 19
- Member party: Christian Democratic Appeal (CDA); Labour Party (PvdA); Christian Union (CU)
- Status in legislature: Centrist majority government (Grand coalition)

History
- Incoming formation: 2006–2007 formation
- Outgoing formation: 2010 formation
- Election: 2006 election
- Outgoing election: 2010 election
- Legislature terms: 2006–2010
- Predecessor: Third Balkenende cabinet
- Successor: First Rutte cabinet

The fourth Balkenende cabinet was the executive branch of the Government of the Netherlands from 22 February 2007 until 14 October 2010. The cabinet was formed by the Christian-democratic Christian Democratic Appeal (CDA) and Christian Union (CU) and the social-democratic Labour Party (PvdA) after the election of 2006. The cabinet was a centrist grand coalition and had a slim majority in the House of Representatives with Christian Democratic Leader Jan Peter Balkenende serving as prime minister. Labour Leader Wouter Bos served as Deputy Prime Minister and Minister of Finance while Social Christian Leader André Rouvoet served as Deputy Prime Minister and Minister without Portfolio for Health, Welfare and Sport.

The cabinet served during the unstable late 2000s; domestically it had to deal with the 2008 financial crisis and major reforms to the education system, while internationally, it had to deal with the war on terror and the government support for the Task Force Uruzgan. The cabinet suffered several major internal conflicts including multiple cabinet resignations. The cabinet fell prematurely on 20 February 2010 after the Labour Party refused to support an extension of the Task Force Uruzgan mission with the Labour Party cabinet members resigning on 23 February 2010, and the cabinet continued in a demissionary capacity until it was replaced after the election of 2010. As of 2026 the fourth Balkenende cabinet remains the only cabinet between 1994 and 2025 with the People's Party for Freedom and Democracy (VVD) not as part of the government.

== Formation ==
Composition of the cabinet in relation to the rest of the legislature

Following the fall of the Second Balkenende cabinet on 30 June 2006 the Democrats 66 (D66) left the coalition and the Christian Democratic Appeal and the People's Party for Freedom and Democracy (VVD) formed a rump cabinet. The Third Balkenende cabinet was installed on 7 July 2006 and served as a caretaker government until the election of 2006 on 22 November 2006. After the election the Christian Democratic Appeal (CDA) of incumbent Prime Minister Jan Peter Balkenende was the winner of the election but lost 3 seats and had now a total of 41 seats. The Labour Party (PvdA) of Wouter Bos lost 9 seats and had now 33 seats. The Socialist Party (SP) of Jan Marijnissen was the biggest winner with 16 new seats and had now 25 seats. Two new parties won representation in the House of Representatives, the recently founded Party for Freedom (PVV) of Geert Wilders, a former Member of the House of Representatives for the People's Party for Freedom and Democracy won nine seats and the Party for the Animals (PvdD) of Marianne Thieme, a noted animal rights activist won two seats, the first time an animal advocacy party won representation in a national legislative body.

On 25 November 2006 Queen Beatrix appointed Member of the Council of State Rein Jan Hoekstra (CDA) as Informateur. Hoekstra explored the possibilities for the different three party coalitions, since no two parties could form a majority in the House of Representatives together. This resulted in a coalition agreement between the Christian Democratic Appeal (CDA), Labour Party (PvdA) and the Christian Union (CU), together these three parties had 79 seats out of 150 seats in the House of Representatives.

On 20 December 2006 Queen Beatrix appointed former Chairman of the Social-Economic Council Herman Wijffels (CDA) as Informateur to start the second information round and negotiate a coalition agreement between the Leader of the Christian Democratic Appeal Jan Peter Balkenende, the Leader of the Labour Party Wouter Bos and the Leader of the Christian Union André Rouvoet. On 7 February 2007 a coalition was reached with the motto of the agreement: "Samen leven, samen werken" ("Living together, working together"). On 9 February 2007 Queen Beatrix appointed incumbent Prime Minister Jan Peter Balkenende (CDA) as Formateur to start the last phase of the formation. On 22 February the cabinet members were sworn in by Queen Beatrix.

== Term ==
=== Policy ===
The coalition agreement titled "Living together, working together" was presented on 7 February in a press conference by Balkenende, Bos, Rouvoet. It is structured into six commitments of the new cabinet. If a proposal was included in a party's electoral manifesto, this is mentioned as well.

- An active and constructive role in the world, which is characterized by these policies:
  - Continued investments into the Joint Strike Fighter (as the CDA proposed).
  - The new cabinet is not in favour of a new referendum on the European Constitution, which was voted down in 2005, but will consider new initiatives (both the CDA and CU opposed the referendum initially).
- An innovative, competitive and entrepreneurial economy, which is characterized by these policies:
  - 1 billion increased spending on education (as all parties proposed).
  - Privatization of Schiphol airport is shelved (as the CU and the PvdA proposed).
- A durable environment, which is characterized by these policies:
  - 800 million euros additional spending on renewable energy (as both the PvdA and the CU proposed).
  - Pollution will be taxed more heavily (as both the PvdA and the CU proposed).
  - A tax on airline tickets totalling 350 million euros (as all parties proposed).
  - No new investments in nuclear energy (as the CU and the PvdA proposed).
- Social cohesion, which is characterized by these policies:
  - A reform of the system of basic state pensions: people who have private pensions of 15,000 euros and higher and who stop working before the age of 65 will pay an additional tax as of 2011. People who work beyond 65 receive tax breaks. This measure should guarantee an affordable basic state pension (AOW) despite trends in population ageing (a compromise between the PvdA, which wanted to tax all rich elderly and the CDA which wanted incentives to make people work longer).
  - Public social housing will not be liberalised, rent rates may be raised only in line with inflation (as the PvdA proposed).
  - The tax deduction on mortgage interest payments remains unchanged (as the CDA proposed).
  - Investments in problem areas in the large cities to make them "beautiful neighbourhoods" (as the PvdA proposed).
  - Re-implementation of the subsidized jobs-scheme for the unemployed (as the PvdA proposed).
  - Childcare spending totalling 700 million euros (free child care was a PvdA election promise and opposed by CDA).
- Safety, stability and respect, which is characterized by these policies:
  - Reduction of all crimes by 25%.
  - A ban on burqas and other face covering clothing for security reasons (as the CDA proposed).
- Government and a servile public sector
  - In response to opposition to extravagant wages earned by some top civil servants and top-level managers of quangos, sometimes five times that of the prime minister, no one will be allowed an income greater than the prime minister's. To accomplish this, the prime minister's salary will be increased.
  - Cutting the number of civil servants to save 750 million euros.
  - Women seeking an abortion are to expect an additional waiting period between first consultation and actual procedure on top of the already mandatory five days waiting period (as the CU proposed).
  - Minor reforms of the health care-system, including the abolishment of the no claim and the re-inclusion of dental care into the basic insurance.
  - Increased taxation on cigarettes and liquor, smoke-free bars and restaurants by 2011.
  - A general pardon for asylum seekers who entered the Netherlands before the new Asylum Law came into effect (as both the CU and the PvdA proposed).
  - The coalition wants to have a budget surplus of 1% of the GDP by 2011 with a projected 2% annual economic growth (as all parties proposed).

=== Fall and aftermath ===
In February 2010, NATO had officially requested the Netherlands to extend its military involvement in Task Force Uruzgan, the ISAF operation in the Afghan province of Uruzgan, aimed at training Afghan security forces and transfer of responsibilities to the local authorities. Coalition party PvdA strongly opposed the extension of the mission. The collision between the government and the parliament, of which the majority disagreed with an extension of the mission, as well as between the coalition partners in the cabinet, threatened the existence of the cabinet and led to its fall in the night between 19 and 20 February 2010, after 16 hours of deliberations between the cabinet members. The Labour members resigned from the cabinet.

As queen Beatrix was on holiday in Austria (Lech am Arlberg) at the time, Balkenende informed her formally by phone about the break-up of the cabinet. She returned soon to The Hague and held consultations with advisors and with the leaders of all political groupings in parliament on 22 and 23 February. On the latter day, the queen accepted the resignations of the PvdA ministers and secretaries, and maintained the 15 remaining cabinet members of CDA and Christian Union (whose positions had also been offered to the queen for consideration, a customary procedure in the Netherlands) to run a demissionary cabinet (caretaker government), which meant that it could not make large decisions or proposals on topics deemed controversial. No new cabinet members were appointed, the already functioning ministers and state secretaries taking care of the empty positions until a new government would be formed. Early elections were held on 9 June 2010. The cabinet formation started a day later.

Labour leader Wouter Bos, who resigned as deputy prime minister and finance minister, announced that he wanted to continue to lead his party. Labour Party leader Bos denied that the upcoming local elections in the Netherlands played a role in the decision to refuse to compromise on a possible extension of the Dutch military mission in Afghanistan.

== Cabinet members ==
Ministers
Ministers		Title/Ministry		Term of office		Party
Ministers		Title/Ministry		Begin	End	Party
Jan Peter Balkenende	Jan Peter Balkenende	Prime Minister	General Affairs	22 July 2002^{[Retained]}	14 October 2010	CDA
Wouter Bos	Wouter Bos	Deputy; Prime Minister	Finance	22 February 2007	23 February 2010^{[Res]}	PvdA
Wouter Bos	Wouter Bos	Minister	Finance	22 February 2007	23 February 2010^{[Res]}	PvdA
André Rouvoet	André Rouvoet	Deputy; Prime Minister	Health, Welfare and Sport	22 February 2007	14 October 2010	CU
André Rouvoet	André Rouvoet	Minister	Health, Welfare and Sport	22 February 2007	14 October 2010	CU
André Rouvoet	André Rouvoet	Minister	Education, Culture and Science	23 February 2010	14 October 2010	CU
Guusje ter Horst	Guusje ter Horst	Minister	Interior and Kingdom Relations	22 February 2007	23 February 2010^{[Res]}	PvdA
Ernst Hirsch Ballin	Ernst Hirsch Ballin	Minister	Interior and Kingdom Relations	23 February 2010	14 October 2010	CDA
Ernst Hirsch Ballin	Ernst Hirsch Ballin	Minister	Justice	22 September 2006^{[Retained]}	14 October 2010	CDA
Maxime Verhagen	Maxime Verhagen	Minister	Foreign Affairs	22 February 2007	14 October 2010	CDA
Maxime Verhagen	Maxime Verhagen	Minister	Foreign Affairs	23 February 2010	14 October 2010	CDA
Jan Kees de Jager	Jan Kees de Jager	Minister	Finance	23 February 2010	14 October 2010^{[Continued]}	CDA
Maria van der Hoeven	Maria van der Hoeven	Minister	Economic Affairs	22 February 2007	14 October 2010	CDA
Eimert van Middelkoop	Eimert van Middelkoop	Minister	Defence	22 February 2007	14 October 2010	CU
Eimert van Middelkoop	Eimert van Middelkoop	Minister	Housing, Spatial; Planning and the Environment	23 February 2010	14 October 2010	CU
Ab Klink	Ab Klink	Minister	Health, Welfare and Sport	22 February 2007	14 October 2010	CDA
Piet Hein Donner	Piet Hein Donner	Minister	Social Affairs and Employment	22 February 2007	14 October 2010	CDA
Ronald Plasterk	Ronald Plasterk	Minister	Education, Culture and Science	22 February 2007	23 February 2010^{[Res]}	PvdA
Camiel Eurlings	Camiel Eurlings	Minister	Transport and Water Management	22 February 2007	14 October 2010	CDA
Gerda Verburg	Gerda Verburg	Minister	Agriculture, Nature and Food Quality	22 February 2007	14 October 2010	CDA
Jacqueline Cramer	Jacqueline Cramer	Minister	Housing, Spatial; Planning and the Environment	22 February 2007	23 February 2010^{[Res]}	PvdA
Tineke Huizinga	Tineke Huizinga	Minister	Housing, Spatial; Planning and the Environment	23 February 2010	14 October 2010	CU

Minister without portfolio
Minister		Title/Ministry/Portfolio(s)			Term of office		Party
Minister		Title/Ministry/Portfolio(s)			Begin	End	Party
Bert Koenders	Bert Koenders	Minister	Foreign Affairs	• Development; Cooperation	22 February 2007	23 February 2010^{[Res]}	PvdA
Ella Vogelaar	Ella Vogelaar	Minister	Housing, Spatial; Planning and the Environment	• Integration • Public Housing • Minorities	22 February 2007	14 November 2008^{[Res]}	PvdA
Eberhard van der Laan	Eberhard van der Laan	Minister	Housing, Spatial; Planning and the Environment	• Integration • Public Housing • Minorities	14 November 2008	23 February 2010^{[Res]}	PvdA

State Secretaries
State Secretary		Title/Ministry/Portfolio(s)			Term of office		Party
State Secretary		Title/Ministry/Portfolio(s)			Begin	End	Party
Ank Bijleveld	Ank Bijleveld	State Secretary	Interior and Kingdom; Relations	• Kingdom; Relations • Municipalities • Provinces • Emergency; Management	22 February 2007	14 October 2010	CDA
Frans Timmermans	Frans Timmermans	State Secretary^{[Title]}	Foreign Affairs	• European Union • Benelux	22 February 2007	23 February 2010^{[Res]}	PvdA
Jan Kees de Jager	Jan Kees de Jager	State Secretary	Finance	• Fiscal Policy • Tax and Customs • Governmental; Budget	22 February 2007	23 February 2010^{[App]}	CDA
Nebahat Albayrak	Nebahat Albayrak	State Secretary	Justice	• Immigration and Asylum • Penitentiaries	22 February 2007	23 February 2010^{[Res]}	PvdA
Frank Heemskerk	Frank Heemskerk	State Secretary^{[Title]}	Economic Affairs	• Trade and Export • Small and Medium-sized; Businesses • Consumer; Protection • Telecommunication • Postal Service • Tourism^{[Title]}	22 February 2007	23 February 2010^{[Res]}	PvdA
Cees van der Knaap	Cees van der Knaap	State Secretary	Defence	• Human; Resources • Equipment	22 February 2007^{[Retained]}	18 December 2007^{[App]}	CDA
Jack de Vries	Jack de Vries	State Secretary	Defence	• Human; Resources • Equipment	18 December 2007	18 May 2010^{[Res]}	CDA
Jet Bussemaker	Jet Bussemaker	State Secretary	Health, Welfare and Sport	• Elderly care • Disability policy • Medical ethics • Sport	22 February 2007	23 February 2010^{[Res]}	PvdA
Ahmed Aboutaleb	Ahmed Aboutaleb	State Secretary	Social Affairs and Employment	• Social Security • Unemployment • Occupational; Safety • Social Services	22 February 2007	18 December 2008^{[App]}	PvdA
Jetta Klijnsma	Jetta Klijnsma	State Secretary	Social Affairs and Employment	• Social Security • Unemployment • Occupational; Safety • Social Services	18 December 2008	23 February 2010^{[Res]}	PvdA
Marja van Bijsterveldt	Marja van Bijsterveldt	State Secretary	Education, Culture and Science	• Secondary; Education	22 February 2007	23 February 2010	CDA
Marja van Bijsterveldt	Marja van Bijsterveldt	State Secretary	Education, Culture and Science	• Higher; Education • Secondary; Education • Science Policy • Media • Culture • Art • Emancipation	23 February 2010	14 October 2010	CDA
Sharon Dijksma	Sharon Dijksma	State Secretary	Education, Culture and Science	• Primary; Education • Special; Education • Preschool	22 February 2007	23 February 2010^{[Res]}	PvdA
Tineke Huizinga	Tineke Huizinga	State Secretary	Transport and Water Management	• Public; Transport • Water; Management • Weather; Forecasting	22 February 2007	23 February 2010^{[App]}	CU

^{Resigned}
^{Retained from the previous cabinet}
^{Continued in the next cabinet}
^{Designated with the diplomatic rank of Minister}
^{Appointed as Minister of Finance}
^{Appointed as Mayor of Ede}
^{Appointed as Mayor of Rotterdam}
^{Appointed as Minister of Housing, Spatial Planning and the Environment}

== Trivia ==
- Six cabinet members had previous experience as scholars and professors: Jan Peter Balkenende (Christian Theology), Guusje ter Horst (Dental Medicine), Ernst Hirsch Ballin (Constitutional and Administrative Law), Ronald Plasterk (Molecular Genetics), Jacqueline Cramer (Environmental Studies) and Jet Bussemaker (Political Science).
- Seven cabinet members (later) served as Mayor: Guusje ter Horst (Nijmegen), Eberhard van der Laan (Amsterdam), Ank Bijleveld (Hof van Twente), Cees van der Knaap (Ede), Ahmed Aboutaleb (Rotterdam), Jetta Klijnsma (The Hague) and Marja van Bijsterveldt (Schipluiden and Delft).
- Ten cabinet members would later have other high-profile work, in the public sector: Wouter Bos (Dutch Investment Agency), André Rouvoet (Healthcare Insurance association) and Maxime Verhagen (Construction association), in the private sector: Jan Kees de Jager (KPN) and Ab Klink (VGZ Cooperative), and international functions: Maria van der Hoeven (International Energy Agency), Gerda Verburg (Food and Agriculture Organization), Bert Koenders (United Nations), Frans Timmermans (European Commission) and Frank Heemskerk (World Bank Group).

== Gallery ==
Photos of the fourth Balkenende cabinet
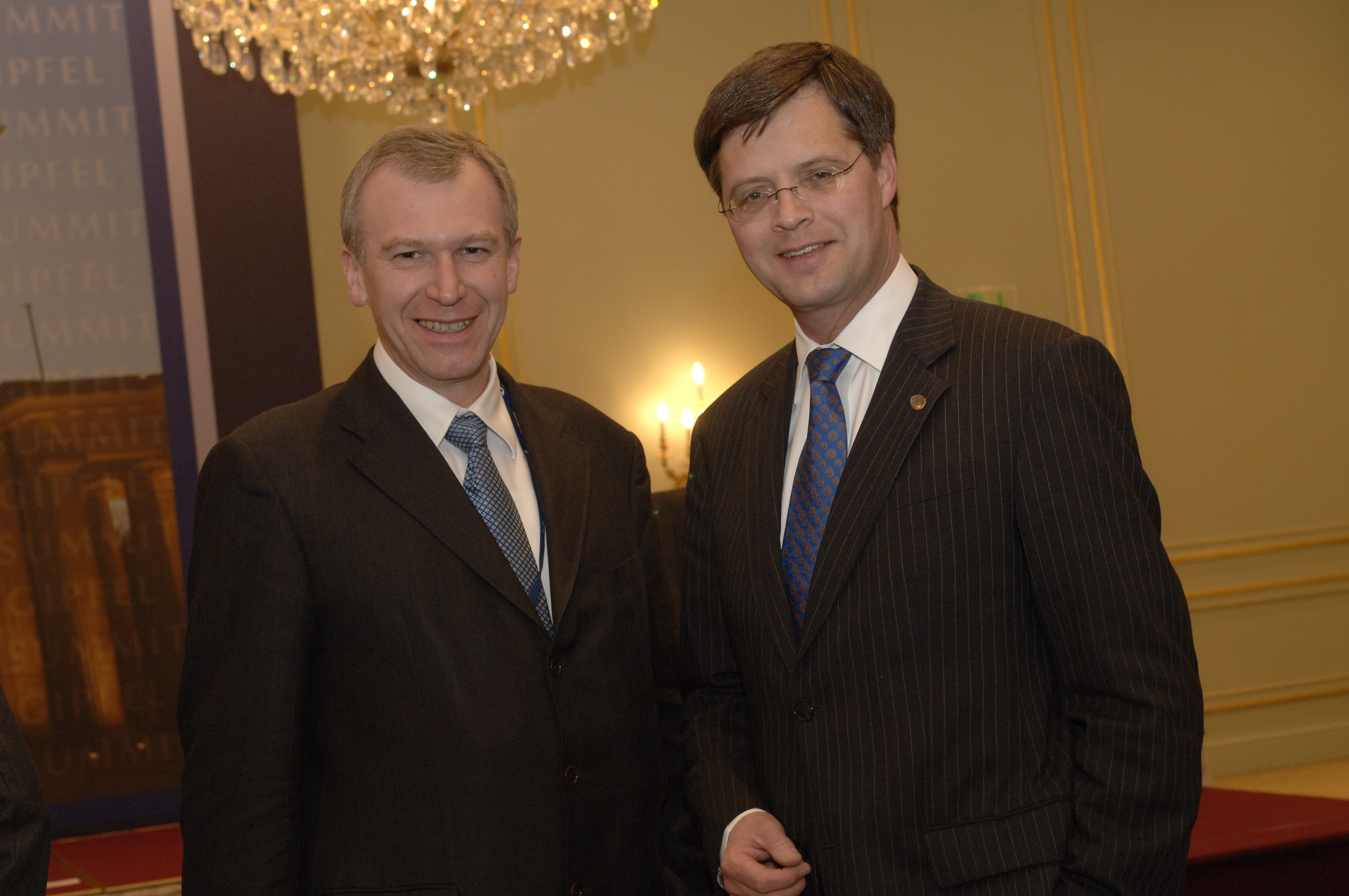
Flemish Christian Democratic Leader Yves Leterme and Prime Minister Jan Peter Balkenende at a European People's Party conference in Berlin on 24 March 2007.

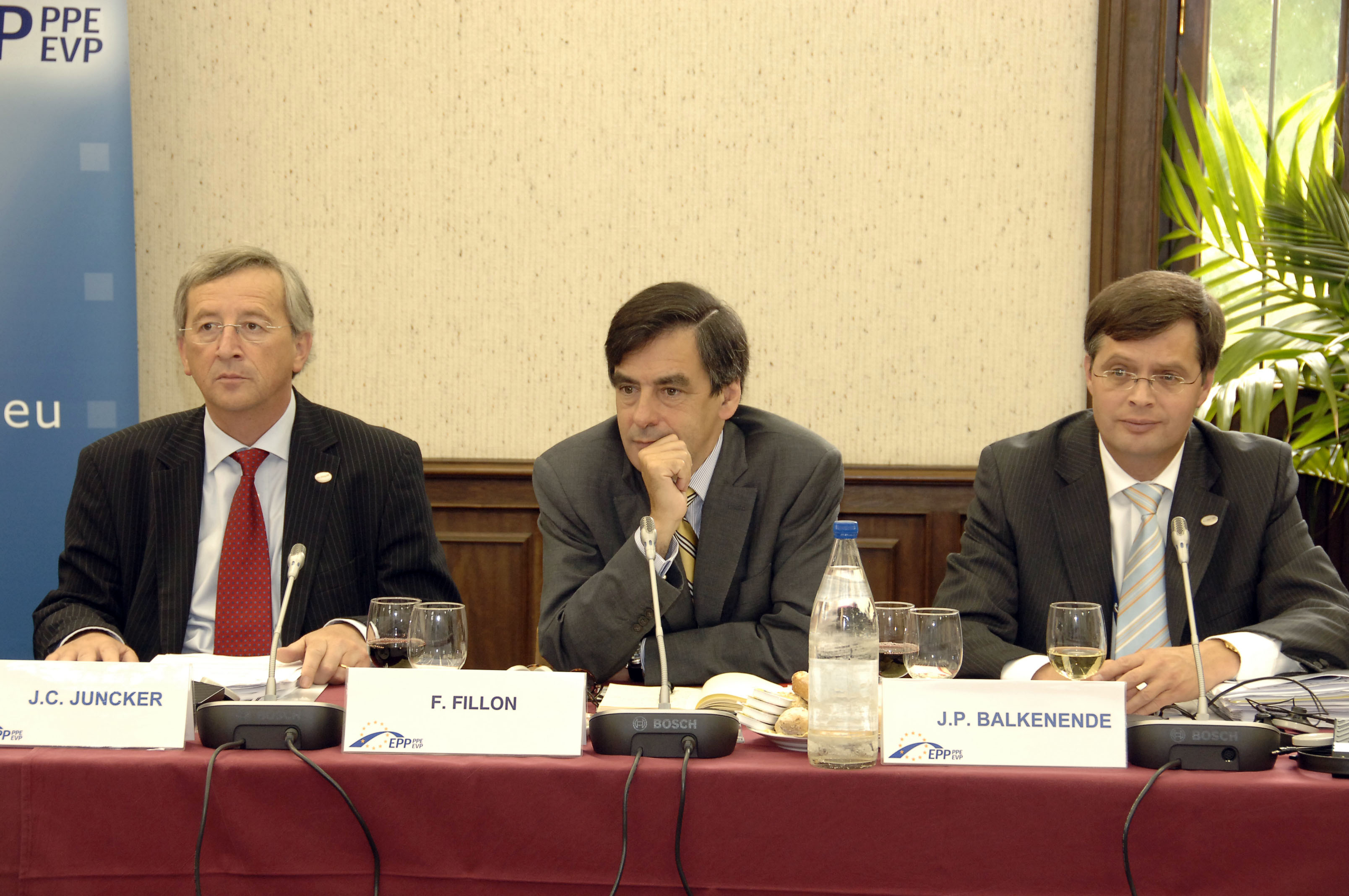
Prime Minister of Luxembourg Jean-Claude Juncker, Prime Minister of France François Fillon and Prime Minister Jan Peter Balkenende at a European People's Party conference in Brussels on 21 June 2007.

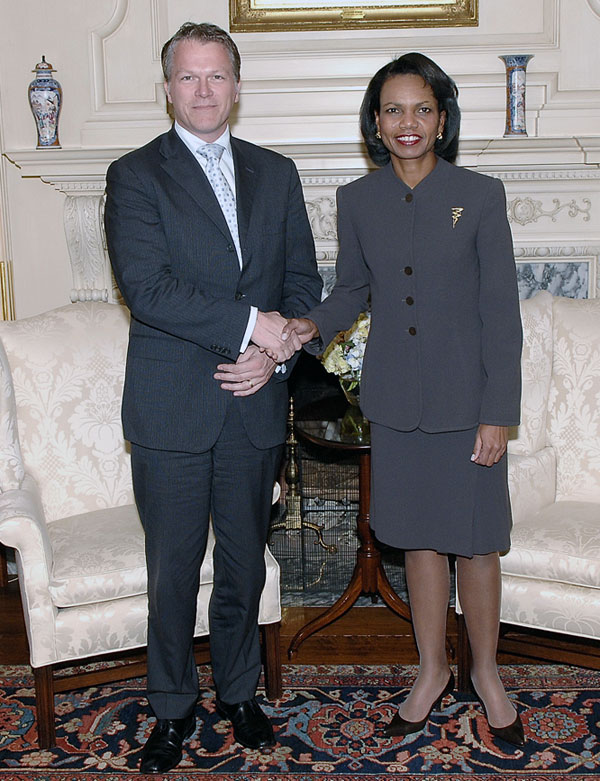
Deputy Prime Minister Wouter Bos and United States Secretary of State Condoleezza Rice at the United States Department of State in Washington, D.C., on 23 October 2007.

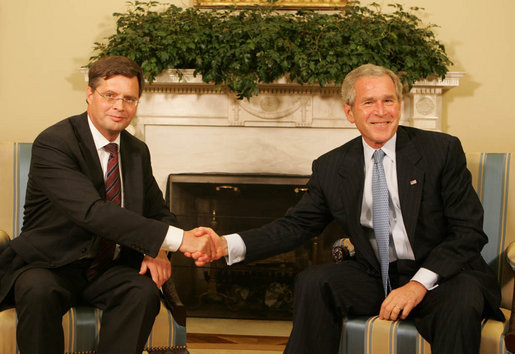
Prime Minister Jan Peter Balkenende and President of the United States George W. Bush in the Oval Office on 5 June 2008.

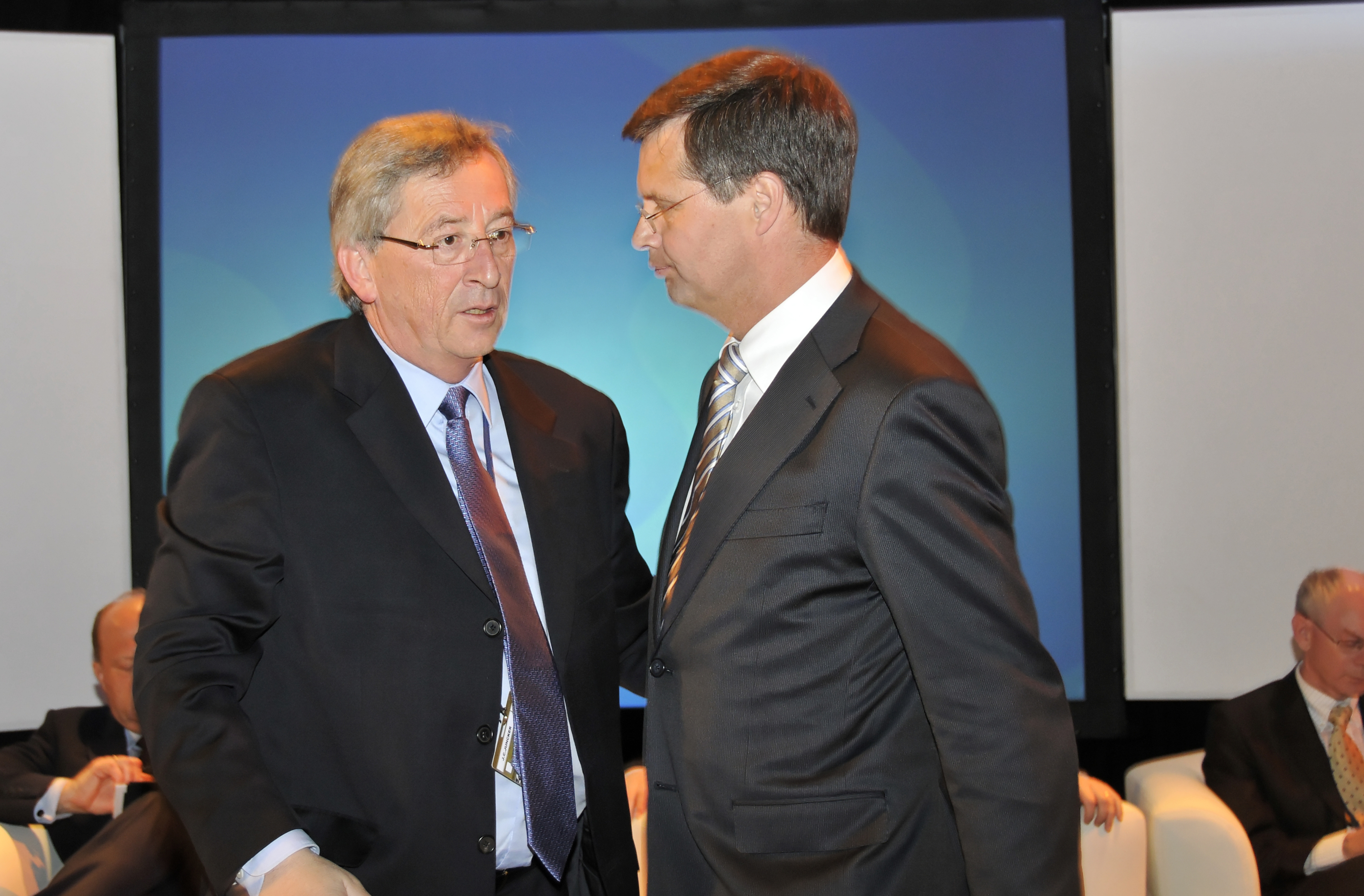
Prime Minister of Luxembourg Jean-Claude Juncker and Prime Minister Jan Peter Balkenende at a European People's Party conference in Warsaw on 29 April 2009.

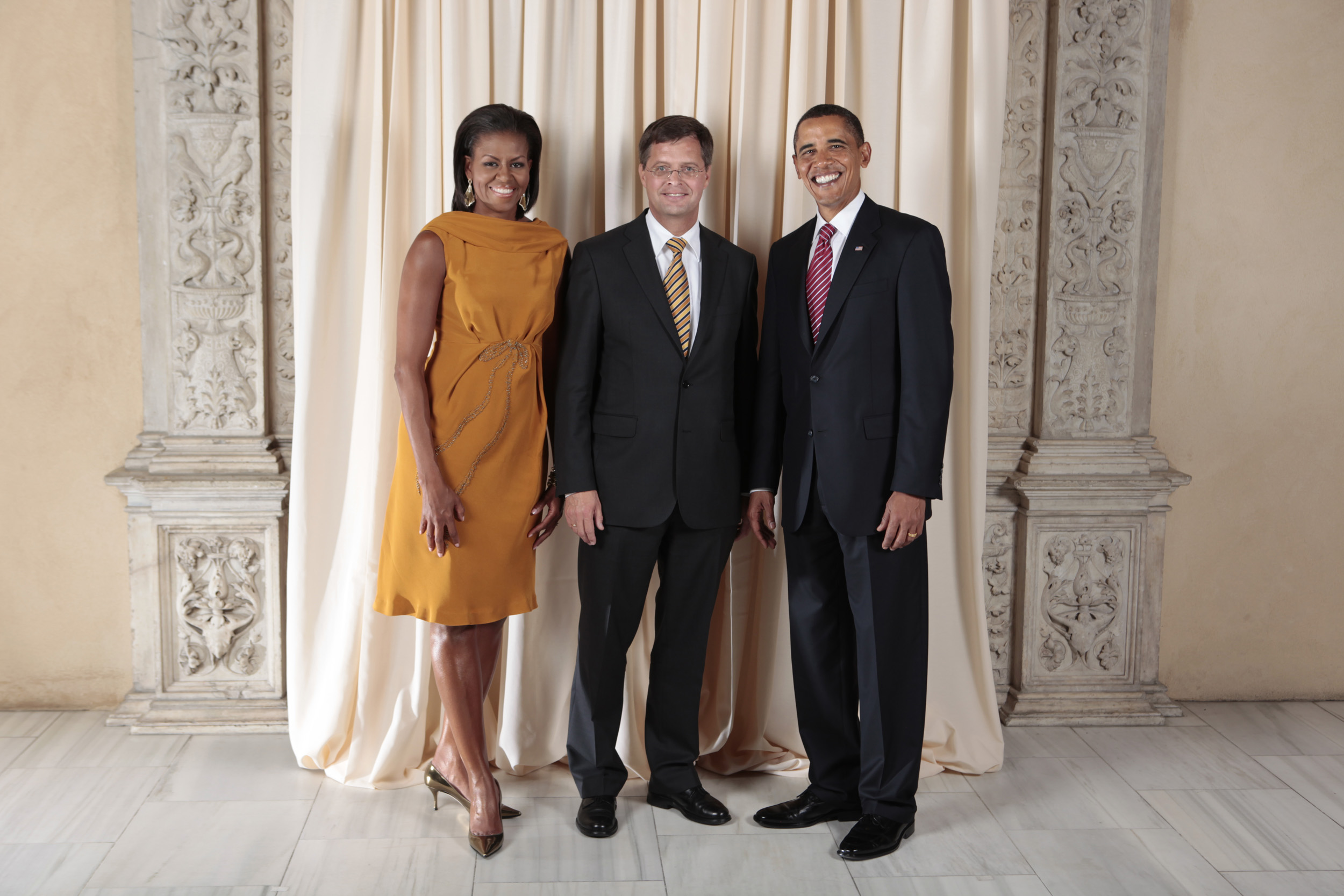
American First Lady Michelle Obama, Prime Minister Jan Peter Balkenende and President of the United States Barack Obama at the Metropolitan Museum of Art in New York City on 23 September 2009.

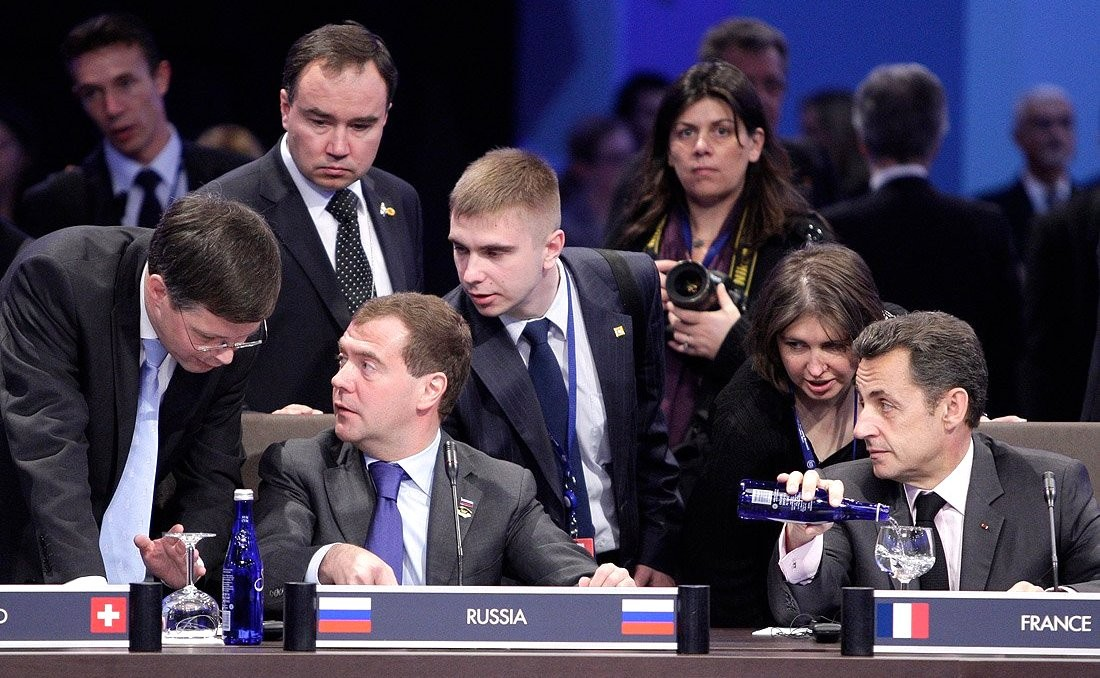
Prime Minister Jan Peter Balkenende, President of Russia Dmitry Medvedev and President of France Nicolas Sarkozy at the 2010 Nuclear Security Summit in Washington, D.C., on 14 April 2010.

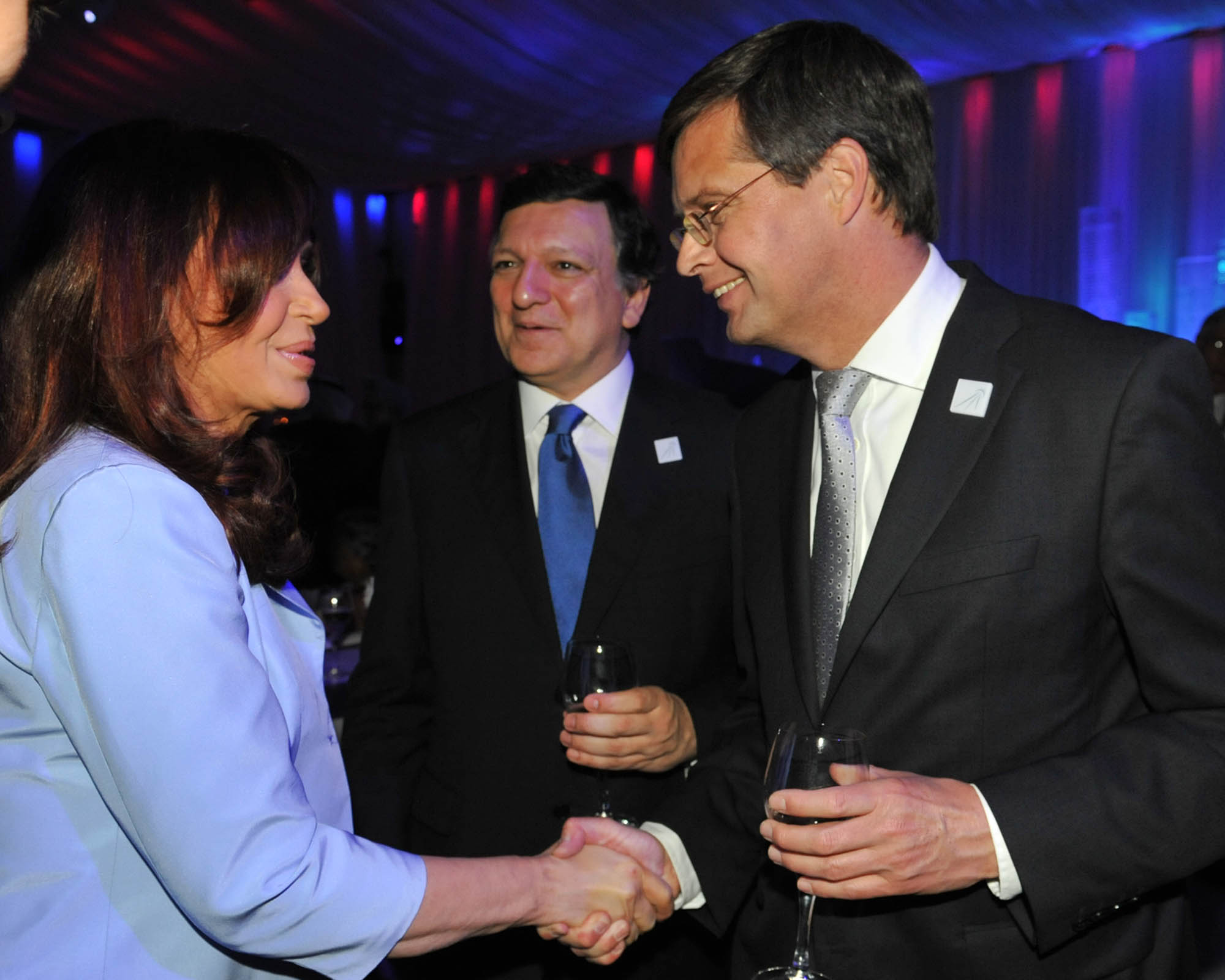
President of Argentina Cristina Fernández de Kirchner, President of the European Commission José Manuel Barroso and Prime Minister Jan Peter Balkenende in Toronto on 10 June 2010.

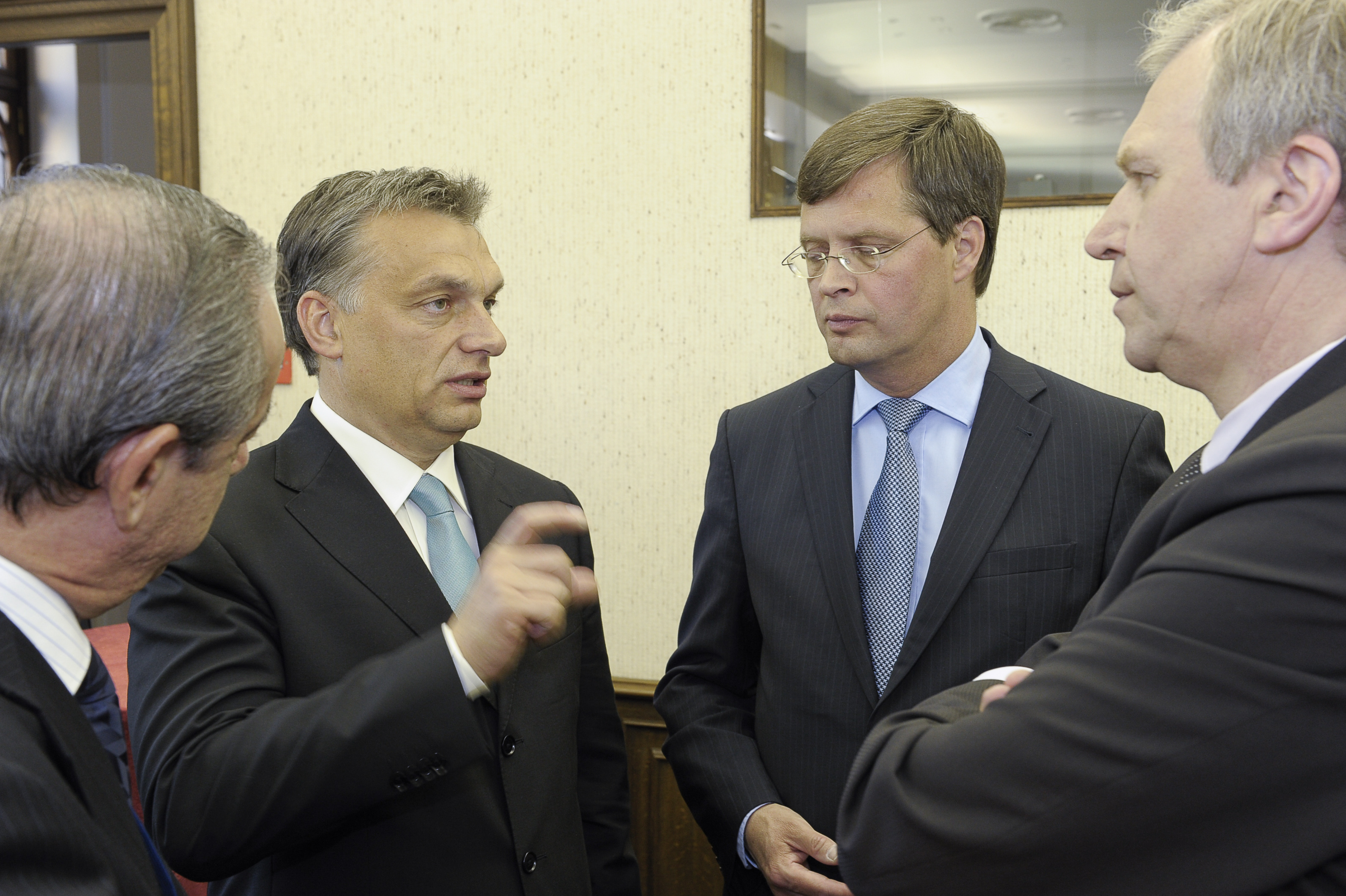
Prime Minister of Hungary Viktor Orbán, Prime Minister Jan Peter Balkenende and Prime Minister of Belgium Yves Leterme at a European People's Party conference in Meise on 16 June 2010.
