= Frank Heemskerk =

Dutch politician (born 1969)

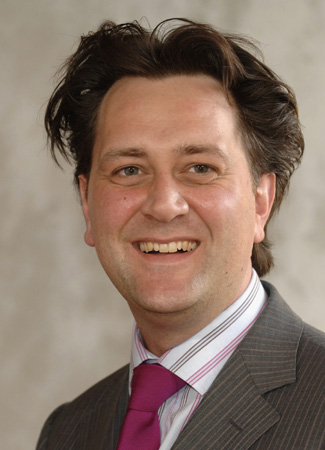

Executive Director at World Bank Group
- In office April 2013 – Present

Minister for Foreign Trade within the Ministry of Economic Affairs
- In office 22 February 2007 – 23 February 2010

Member of the House of Representatives
- In office 2003–2006

Personal details
- Born: July 26, 1969 (age 56) Haarlem, Netherlands
- Party: Labour Party (Netherlands)

Frank Heemskerk (born July 26, 1969, in Haarlem) is a former Dutch politician. He was member of Parliament for the Labour Party between 2003 and 2006 and was Minister for Foreign Trade within the Ministry of Economic Affairs from 2006 till 2010.

He serves as an executive director at the Board of the World Bank Group, and represents the constituency of Armenia, Bosnia & Herzegovina, Bulgaria, Croatia, Cyprus, Georgia, Israel, Macedonia, Moldova, Montenegro, The Netherlands, Romania and Ukraine.

He is the Chairman of the Audit Committee, and a member of the World Bank Pension Finance Committee. From 2013 to 2014, Mr. Heemskerk served a member of the Budget Committee, and also as a member of the Human Resources Committee.

From 2011 to 2013, Mr. Heemskerk was a member of the executive board of Royal HaskoningDHV, an independent, engineering and project management consultancy with 7,000 staff members and 100 offices worldwide. He was in charge of the Water, Buildings, and Infrastructure business lines, and responsible for Group Finance and ICT.

Mr. Heemskerk served from 2007 to 2010 as Minister for Foreign Trade of the Netherlands. During this period he was also responsible for the Post, Telecom&ICT, Consumer Policy and Tourism. From 2003 to 2006, he was a member of the House of Representatives of the Netherlands, where he was spokesman of the Dutch Labor Party (PvdA) on financial supervision, economic affairs and health care reforms.

Heemskerk studied economics at the University of Amsterdam. He worked for ABN AMRO and made a career in the banking world. He also got involved in the social-democratic renewal movement Niet Nix. Mr. Heemskerk started his career in 1995 at ABN AMRO, where he has held various positions until 2003. In the 2003 elections Heemskerk was elected to the House of Representatives. In parliament he specialized in the relationship between market and government and with the reform of the health care system. During the 2006 elections Heemskerk was not reelected, as he was the 39th candidate and the PvdA only got 34 seats.

Frank Heemskerk is a member of the Bilderberg Group.
