= Jan van der Jagt =

Dutch politician and architect

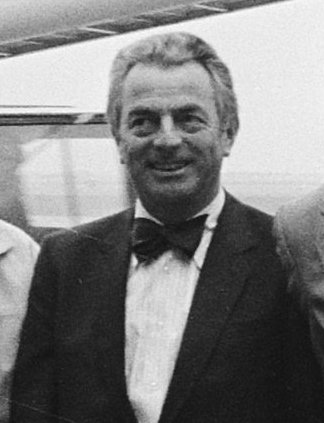
J. van der Jagt (1980)

Jan van der Jagt (30 May 1924 in Rotterdam – 4 August 2001 in Arnhem) was a Dutch politician and architect.

Van der Jagt was a member of the provincial parliament of Gelderland from 1974 to 1977, Party chair of the Reformed Political League (Gereformeerd Politiek Verbond) from 1976 to 1984, and a Senator from 1977 to 1981, and also from 1983 to 1991.

He was made Knight in the Order of the Netherlands Lion on 11 June 1991.
