= 2010 Dutch general election =

- 9 June 2010
- All 150 seats in the House of Representatives; 76 seats needed for a majority
- Turnout: 75.40% (▼4.95pp)
Party	Leader	Vote %	Seats	+/–
VVD	Mark Rutte	20.49	31	+9
PvdA	Job Cohen	19.63	30	−3
PVV	Geert Wilders	15.45	24	+15
CDA	Jan Peter Balkenende	13.61	21	−20
SP	Emile Roemer	9.82	15	−10
D66	Alexander Pechtold	6.95	10	+7
GL	Femke Halsema	6.67	10	+3
CU	André Rouvoet	3.24	5	−1
SGP	Kees van der Staaij	1.74	2	0
PvdD	Marianne Thieme	1.30	2	0
This lists parties that won seats. See the complete results below.
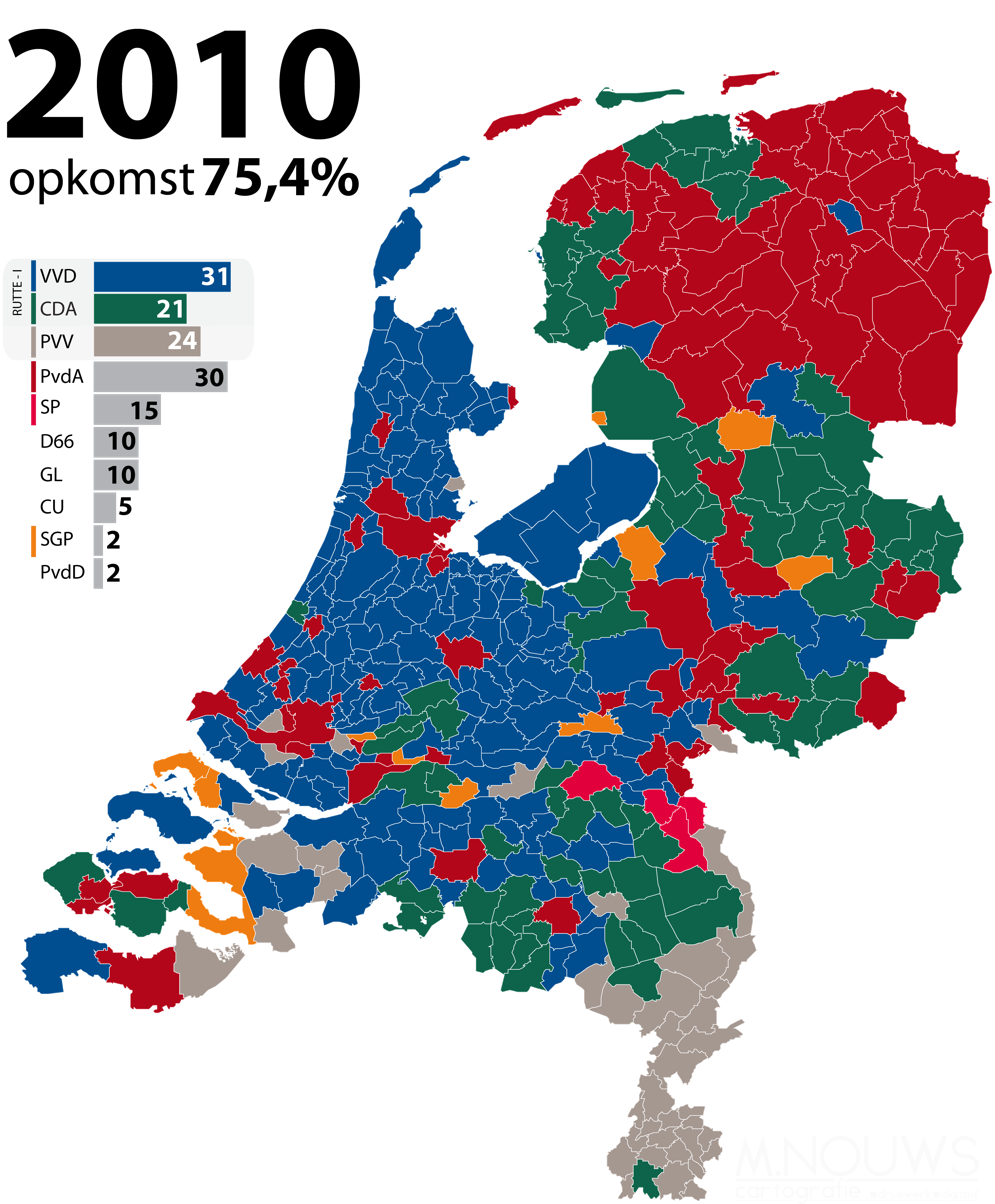
Most voted-for party by municipality
Cabinet before	Cabinet after
Fourth Balkenende cabinet CDA–PvdA–CU	First Rutte cabinet VVD–CDA

General elections were held in the Netherlands on Wednesday 9 June 2010. This was triggered by the fall of Prime Minister Jan Peter Balkenende's fourth cabinet on 20 February with Queen Beatrix accepting the resignation of the Labour Party (PvdA) ministers on 23 February. The conservative liberal People's Party for Freedom and Democracy (VVD), led by Mark Rutte, won the largest number of seats in the House of Representatives while the social democratic PvdA, led by Job Cohen, came a narrow second. The election was also noted for the rise of the Party for Freedom (PVV), which came third, led by controversial politician Geert Wilders. On the other hand, Balkenende's Christian Democratic Appeal (CDA) saw a poor result, losing half its seats (along with popular support) and dropping from first to fourth place. The Socialist Party (SP) also lost seats. Notably, the 31 seats won by the VVD was its most since 1998.

After the election, the formation of a new government took 127 days. Both the VVD and the PvdA hoped to have a leading role. VVD talks with the PvdA and other left-wing parties (trying to form a so-called purple coalition without Christian parties) broke down; however, Rutte was able to form a right-wing coalition of the VVD and CDA, with a confidence and supply agreement with the PVV. It was the first coalition government not to be led by a Christian democratic or social democratic party in 92 years, as well as the first to be led by the VVD. Rutte was sworn in as prime minister on 14 October, becoming the first liberal to hold that post since 1918.

The 150 seats of the House of Representatives were contested, and filled using party-list proportional representation for a nominal four-year term.

== Background ==
The election follows the PvdA's withdrawal in February from the coalition over the contribution of Dutch soldiers to the War in Afghanistan. According to the Dutch constitution new elections had to be held within 83 days.

== Debates ==
The first radio debate was held on 21 May 2010. The first television debate, held on 23 May was, according to instant polls, won by Mark Rutte on 36%, with Job Cohen second on 24%, and Geert Wilders and Jan Peter Balkenende third, on 18%.

== Opinion polls ==
Party	2006		Politieke Barometer		Peil.nl		TNS-NIPO	
Party	%	Seats (150)	8–6–2010	Exit polls (21.00 hrs)	7–6–2010	Exit polls	31–5–2010	Exit polls
CDA	26.5	41	24	21	25	24	21	21
PvdA	21.2	33	30	31	30	30	31	29
SP	16.6	25	14	15	12	13	13	15
VVD	14.7	22	33	31	36	34	37	36
PVV	5.9	9	17	23	18	18	17	18
GL	4.6	7	11	11	10	11	8	10
CU	4.0	6	6	5	6	6	9	6
D66	2.0	3	10	10	10	11	10	11
PvdD	1.8	2	2	1	1	1	1	1
SGP	1.6	2	3	2	2	2	3	2
ToN/Trots*	–	–	0	0	0	0	0	1
Others	1.2	0	0	0	0	0	–	–
* Trots op Nederland is the party formed by Rita Verdonk after she split from the VVD in 2007 and became an independent representative.

Polls indicated that the elections were too close to call.

== Results ==
Turnout was reported to be over 5% lower than the previous elections allegedly due to heavy rain and stormy weather.

Party	Votes	%	Seats	+/–
People's Party for Freedom and Democracy	1,929,575	20.49	31	+9
Labour Party	1,848,805	19.63	30	−3
Party for Freedom	1,454,493	15.45	24	+15
Christian Democratic Appeal	1,281,886	13.61	21	−20
Socialist Party	924,696	9.82	15	−10
Democrats 66	654,167	6.95	10	+7
GroenLinks	628,096	6.67	10	+3
Christian Union	305,094	3.24	5	−1
Reformed Political Party	163,581	1.74	2	0
Party for the Animals	122,317	1.30	2	0
Trots op Nederland	52,937	0.56	0	New
Party for Human and Spirit	26,196	0.28	0	New
Pirate Party	10,471	0.11	0	New
List 17 / Feijen List	7,456	0.08	0	New
Partij één	2,042	0.02	0	New
New Netherlands	2,010	0.02	0	New
Heel NL	1,255	0.01	0	New
Evangelical Party Netherlands	924	0.01	0	New
Total	9,416,001	100.00	150	0
Valid votes	9,416,001	99.71		
Invalid/blank votes	26,976	0.29		
Total votes	9,442,977	100.00		
Registered voters/turnout	12,524,152	75.40		
Source: Kiesraad

=== By province ===
Results by province
Province	VVD	PvdA	PVV	CDA	SP	D66	GL	CU	SGP	PvdD	Others
Drenthe	19.2	26.2	13.0	13.8	9.8	5.2	5.9	4.3	0.5	1.1	1.0
Flevoland	24.5	19.0	16.2	10.6	8.6	5.5	5.6	4.9	2.5	1.4	1.2
Friesland	15.5	24.8	11.4	18.2	11.5	4.7	6.2	5.1	0.6	1.1	0.9
Gelderland	19.4	18.7	13.5	15.7	9.7	6.6	6.6	4.2	3.4	1.1	1.1
Groningen	14.5	27.6	11.4	11.1	11.7	6.5	8.3	6.1	0.5	1.5	0.8
Limburg	15.5	15.6	26.8	16.0	12.9	4.7	5.3	0.6	0.1	1.3	1.2
North Brabant	21.0	16.1	17.4	16.2	13.4	6.5	5.5	1.0	0.4	1.1	1.4
North Holland	23.5	23.6	13.5	9.0	8.4	8.9	8.6	1.5	0.2	1.6	1.2
Overijssel	16.9	19.1	12.6	20.4	9.3	5.9	5.4	6.2	2.5	0.9	0.8
South Holland	22.4	18.6	16.9	11.2	8.2	7.4	6.4	3.6	2.7	1.5	1.1
Utrecht	23.2	18.1	12.5	12.0	7.1	9.2	8.9	4.6	2.2	1.2	1.0
Zeeland	17.5	17.4	15.0	16.3	9.2	4.3	4.8	4.3	8.6	1.4	1.2

== Reactions ==
Prime Minister Jan Peter Balkenende stepped down from his position in the CDA and resigned his parliamentary seat on the evening of the election, saying he was taking "political responsibility" for the unsatisfactory election results of his party and that "The voter has spoken, the outcome is clear."

== Government formation ==
Expectations were that the formation of a new government would take some time. The international media also read this as a slim victory for the "austerity-minded" Liberals during the euro area crisis.

On 14 October, Mark Rutte was sworn in as prime minister. Rutte's government resigned on 24 April 2012 over austerity measures.

== Analysis ==
Some international media speculated that "for the first time in this nation's history, a Jewish man, albeit a secular one, is on the verge of becoming the next prime minister ... Job Cohen, who was until recently the Mayor of Amsterdam, and represents the top of the ticket for the PvdA ... is at the end of a long battle to run the country that began in February when the PvdA backed out of the ruling coalition government because it did not want to send Dutch troops back to Afghanistan."

== See also ==
- List of members of the House of Representatives of the Netherlands, 2010–12
- List of candidates in the 2010 Dutch general election
