= Lockheed Martin F-35 Lightning II procurement =

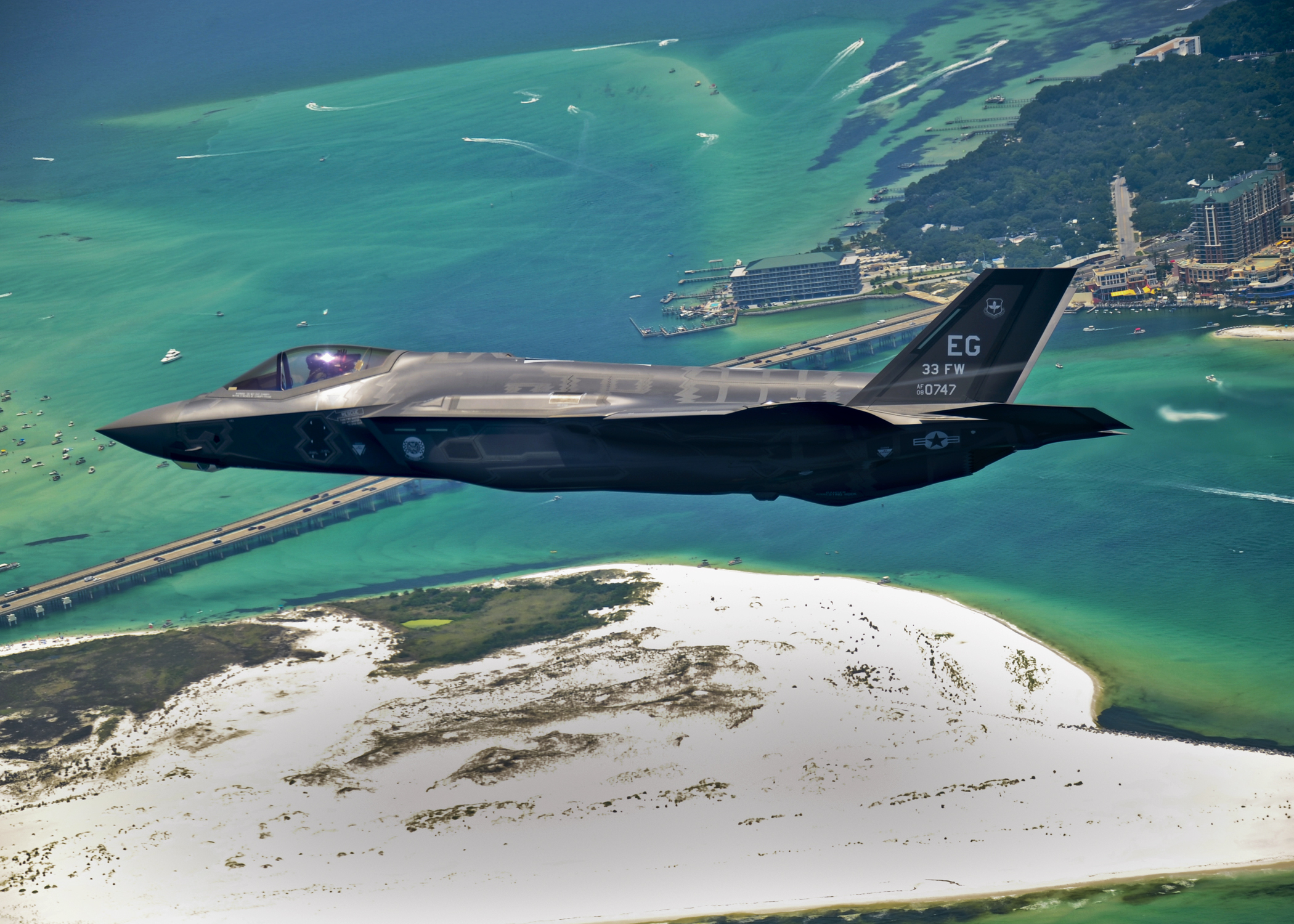
The first operational USAF F-35 on its delivery flight to Eglin Air Force Base in July 2011.

Lockheed Martin F-35 Lightning II procurement is the planned selection and purchase of the Lockheed Martin F-35 Lightning II, also known as the Joint Strike Fighter, (JSF) by various countries.

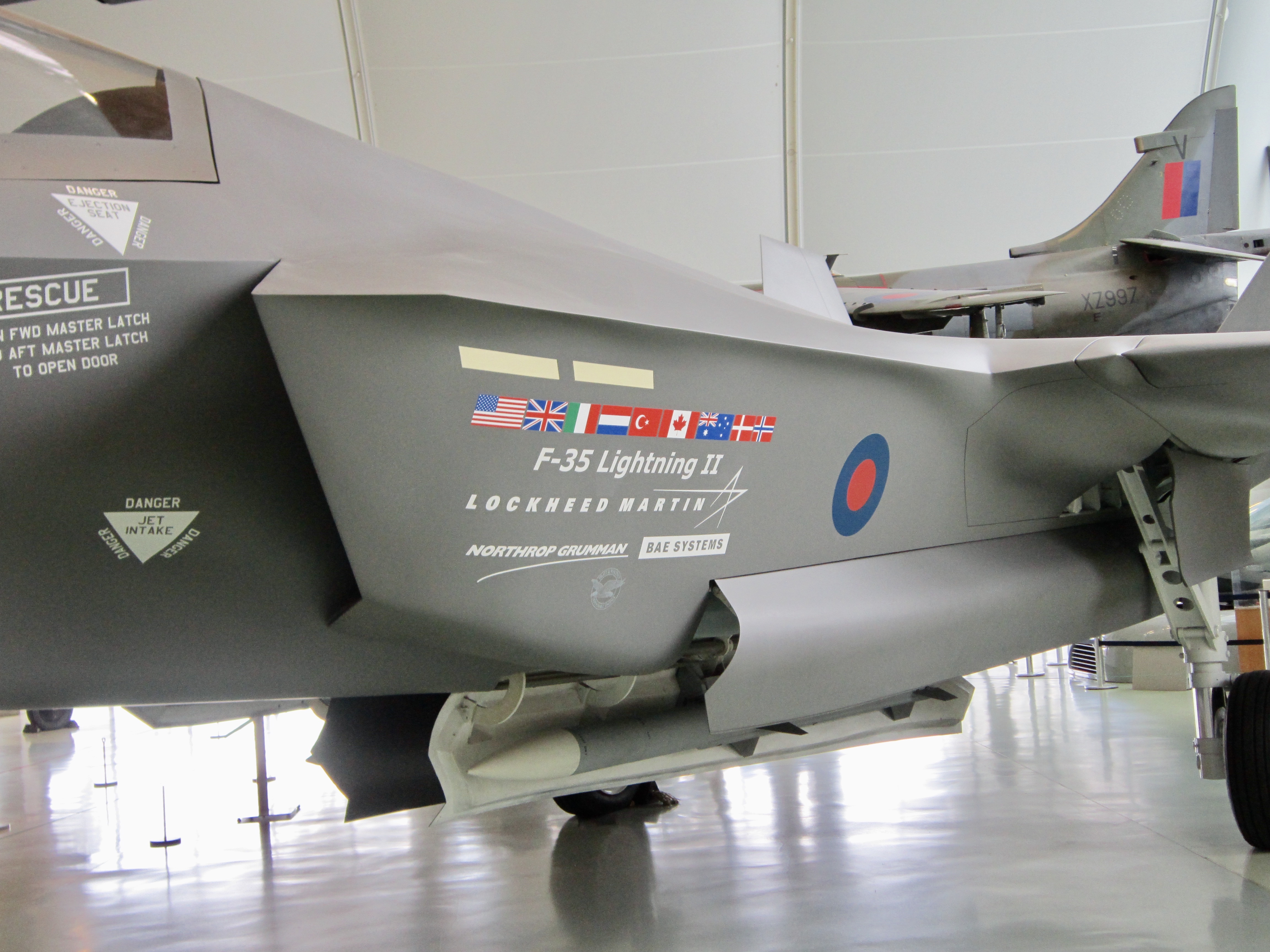
Logos and flags of major contractors and participants of the project on a RAF-coloured F-35 mockup.

The F-35 Lightning II was conceived from the start of the project as having participation from many countries, most of which would both contribute to the manufacture of the aircraft and procure it for their own armed forces. While the United States is the primary customer and financial backer, the United Kingdom, Italy, the Netherlands, Canada, Turkey, Australia, Norway and Denmark agreed to contribute US$4.375 billion toward the development costs of the program. Total development costs are estimated at more than US$40 billion, while the purchase of an estimated 2,400 planes is expected to cost an additional US$200 billion. Norway estimated that each of their planned 52 F-35 fighter jets will cost their country $769 million over their operational lifetime. The nine major partner nations, including the U.S., plan to acquire over 3,100 F-35s through 2035, which, if delivered will make the F-35 one of the most numerous jet fighters.

== Participation and orders ==
There are three levels of international participation. The levels generally reflect the financial stake in the program, the amount of technology transfer and subcontracts open for bid by national companies, and the order in which countries can obtain production aircraft. The United Kingdom is the sole "Level 1" partner, contributing US$2.5 billion, which was about 10% of the planned development costs under the 1995 Memorandum of Understanding that brought the UK into the project. Level 2 partners are Italy, and the Netherlands, who are contributing US$1 billion and US$800 million each respectively. Level 3 partners are Turkey, US$195 million; Canada US$160 million; Australia, US$144 million; Norway, US$122 million and Denmark, US$110 million. Israel and Singapore have joined as so-called "security cooperative participants" (SCP).

Participant nations: Primary customer: United States Tier 1 partner: United Kingdom Tier 2 partners: Italy • Netherlands Tier 3 partners: Australia • Canada • Denmark • Norway Security Cooperative Participants: Israel • Singapore Foreign Military Sales Participants: Belgium • Finland • Germany • Japan • Poland • South Korea • Switzerland • Czech Republic • Greece • Romania

Some initial partner countries, including the United Kingdom, and Norway, Netherlands and Israel have wavered in their public commitment to the JSF program, hinting that the design goals are overambitious or warning that unless they receive more subcontracts or technology transfer, they will forsake JSF for the Eurofighter Typhoon, Saab JAS 39 Gripen, Dassault Rafale or simply upgrade their existing aircraft. While the General Dynamics F-16E/F Fighting Falcon costs $50 million per export copy, the F-35 is likely to cost between $110–130 million. The exported F-35 versions will have the same configuration as the U.S. versions, according to Brigadier General David Heinz, program executive officer in 2009.

In 2001, Lockheed Martin claimed a potential market of 5,179 aircraft, including exports beyond the partner countries. The size of the market was instrumental in determining many of the cost calculations and economies of scale. More recent critical analysis has seriously questioned the assumptions made in estimating these markets and hence the resulting unit cost of the aircraft and its life-cycle costs as well. Congress may allow the U.S. military to perform a "block buy" of 477 aircraft over 3 years, starting the cost/scale-spiral in a desirable direction. Several government officials, including Canadian Industry Minister Tony Clement, have used the production number of 5,000 as recently as September 2010 as an indication of the supposed benefit to industry in providing components and services for this large fleet. Analyst Kenneth Epps stated in November 2010: "The global F-35 market of 'up to' 5,000 aircraft cited by Canadian industry and government officials is outdated and now greatly overstated. Realistically, the likelihood of worldwide F-35 sales is closer to the figure now given as the order total for the program partner countries, that is, 'up to' 3,500 aircraft. The uncritical use of F-35 sales projections that are now almost 10 years out of date calls into question other claims made by officials about the F-35 program."

An issue that affects all the international partners in the F-35 involves access to the computer software code for the aircraft. The F-35 relies heavily on software for operation of radar, weapons, flight controls and also maintenance. The U.S. military has stated that "no country involved in the development of the jets will have access to the software codes" and has indicated that all software upgrades will be done in the U.S. The U.S. government acknowledges that Australia, Britain, Canada, Denmark, Italy, the Netherlands, Norway and Turkey have all expressed dissatisfaction with that unilateral U.S. decision. The UK specifically indicated they might cancel its entire order of F-35s without access to the coding, without which the nation will be unable to maintain its own aircraft. Allen Sens, a defence analyst at the University of British Columbia stated in November 2009: "What has happened is really quite unusual because we're talking about some of America's very close allies. You would have thought they could build in some maintenance codes that could be accessible to their allies." Sens indicated that the decision could be as a result of concerns about software security and also pressure from Congress to protect jobs in the U.S.

In December 2010, leaked United States diplomatic cables disclosed that the US State Department is actively engaged in marketing the F-35 internationally through diplomatic channels and that serious diplomatic pressure had been applied to Norway to buy the aircraft. Jeff Abramson of the Arms Control Association has said that the push to sell the F-35 is part of Obama's "national export initiative" which seeks to double America's export sales through increased arms sales.

European participation in the Joint Strike Fighter project has divided the countries and helped preempt a European fifth generation jet fighter program, undercutting exports for their existing models.

In early 2012, after news leaked of a third restructuring of the program in three years, a parade of high-level visitors from the partner countries visited the United States to check on when they could get their aircraft. Ahead of the usual biannual meeting of military leaders in Australia in mid-March, the partner nations agreed to hold annual meetings at the political level.

In March 2014, a spokesman for Lockheed Martin Canada, Mike Barton, said "We've heard nothing about it impacting foreign interest," in reaction to General Mike Hostage, head of Air Combat Command, calling the aircraft irrelevant without accompanying F-22 Raptors.

== Primary customer ==
=== United States ===
As of April 2010, the United States intends to buy a total of 2,443 aircraft for an estimated US$323 billion, making the sale part of the most expensive defense program in U.S. history.

In September 2010, American purchase plans came under review over the rapidly escalating development and production costs of the aircraft. Initial estimates of US$50 million per aircraft had increased to at least US$92 million, with some U.S. estimates indicating US$135 million. The US Undersecretary of Defense, Ashton Carter, issued a memo in September 2010 requiring proposals on how to drive program costs down, stating "The Department is scrubbing costs with the aim of identifying unneeded cost and rewarding its elimination over time." In response, Lockheed Martin has indicated that it is on "the path to achieving an average unit cost of about $60 million".

Also in September 2010, the U.S. Senate Appropriations Committee indicated that the problems in the F-35 program were symptomatic of Pentagon mismanagement, pointing out "the lack of proper control in the defense budget process". The committee urged the Pentagon "to regain control over its budget". The committee also considered scrapping the entire program at that time, dissuaded only by the country's urgent need for new fighters.

New America Foundation defense analyst Bill Hartung has stated that the U.S. government may try to reduce the overall costs of the program purchasing fewer aircraft, but Hartung also notes that this will increase the per unit cost for international partners and reduce the amount of business given to companies bidding on manufacturing contracts in partner countries.

On 6 January 2011, United States Secretary of Defense Robert M. Gates announced that the Defense Department would cut the number of planes the military will buy from Lockheed Martin in the next two years because of "significant testing problems" which could lead to a costly redesign of the F-35B that the program could not afford during federal budget cuts. "If we cannot fix this variant [F-35B] during this time frame and get it back on track in terms of performance, cost and schedule, then I believe it should be canceled," Gates said in a statement.

The United States Department of Defense planned to buy 14 F-35Bs in fiscal year 2012 and 25 the following year. Instead, six will be bought next year and another six in fiscal year 2013. Over the next five years, the Marine Corps will receive 50 F-35s, down from a planned 110. The number of Navy F-35Cs and Air Force F-35As will also be reduced. The Navy total was reduced by seven jets over the next five years, with most of the cuts in fiscal year 2016, while the number of Air Force jets was decreased by 57 over the next five years. Only 19 jets are slated for delivery next year.

The plan as of early 2011 was that the Marine Corps would purchase 340 of the F-35B and 80 of the F-35C, while the Navy would purchase 260 of the F-35C. The five squadrons of Marine F-35Cs would be assigned to the Navy carrier air wings while the F-35Bs would be used on amphibious ships and ashore.

In March 2011, Vice Admiral David Venlet, the chief of the F-35 Joint Program Office, testified at a U.S. congressional committee that the F-35A procurement cost estimate will be $126.6 million per aircraft, including $15 million for the engine.

By the end of March 2011, the voices in the U.S. calling for the end to the F-35 program were increasing in volume. Dominic Tierney of The Atlantic pointed out the whole program cost is now forecast to exceed US$1T, more than the annual GDP of Australia. He noted, "Money is pouring into the F-35 vortex.... An internal Pentagon report concluded that: "affordability is no longer embraced as a core pillar". In January 2011, even Defense Secretary Robert Gates, a champion of the aircraft, voiced his frustration: "The culture of endless money that has taken hold must be replaced by a culture of restraint"." Tierney further noted that the F-35 is an old Cold War–concept aircraft intended for a war between major powers, and is no longer useful in the 21st century with its asymmetric warfare. He concluded: "It's hard to square the military largesse with our rampant debt."

In April 2011, Winslow Wheeler, a former U.S. advisor to both Republican and Democratic senators, employee of the General Accounting Office and now with the Center for Defense Information in Washington, criticized the F-35's price and performance. "This airplane is nothing to write home about," he stated, it is "a gigantic performance disappointment". Wheeler said: "As an American, this program should be terminated immediately. It's unaffordable and the performance is unacceptable already. We need to start over and form a competitive fly-before-you-buy selection."

In April 2011, the USAF listed "a more affordable JSF" as its top acquisition priority.

On 20 May 2011, Senators on the Armed Services Committee asked Ashton Carter to report on alternatives should the F-35 program fail to delivery timely affordable capabilities, after Carter said that there were no good alternatives to the F-35.

Retiring Defense Secretary Bob Gates has said that troop pay, benefits, and numbers may need to be cut to pay for the F-35 cost overruns.

While the 2012 defense department Selected Acquisition Report shows the USAF purchase of 60 to 80 aircraft per year from 2016 to 2030, the USAF's goals for total numbers of fighter aircraft could be met by maintaining the 48 aircraft per year purchase rate of 2017. The increase in production rate would leave the USAF with 300 more aircraft than planned for in 2030.

On 29 November 2012, the Pentagon reached an agreement on Lot 5 of the F-35 program, buying 32 aircraft. Lot 5 contains 22 F-35As, 3 F-35Bs, and 7 F-35Cs. The contract deal was rushed to protect them from possible sequestration cuts. However the JSF was noted as one of major programs that would suffer cuts if the house of representatives fails to follow the Senate's lead in passing a bill to resolve the United States fiscal cliff. Lot 6 was awarded on 28 December 2012. The contract is for 18 F-35As, 6 F-35Bs, and 7 F-35Cs. Deliveries of the Lot 6 order will begin in mid-2014. Lot 6 included the 31 aircraft for the U.S., plus 3 F-35As for Italy and 2 F-35As for Australia. As of 30 July 2013, Lockheed has delivered 67 F-35s from the first five production lots, with 28 still on order. On 30 July 2013, Lockheed agreed to reduce prices on Lot 6 by 4 percent compared to Lot 5, and will reduce the price of Lot 7 by another 4 percent. Pricing for Lot 5 took one year of negotiating, while Lots 6 and 7 took six months. Lot 6 prices are $100.8 million for the F-35A, $108.5 million for the F-35B, and $120 million for the F-35C. Lot 7 deliveries for 35 aircraft will begin in mid-2015, and includes 19 F-35As for the USAF, 6 F-35Bs for the USMC, 4 F-35Cs for the USN, 3 F-35As for Italy, 2 F-35As for Norway, and 1 F-35B for the U.K. Lot 7 prices are $96.8 million for the F-35A, $104.2 million for the F-35B, and $115.2 million for the F-35C. Full-rate production for the F-35A is expected at $80–90 million per unit. A deal for Lots 6 and 7 was officially finalized on 24 September 2013.

By March 2014, due to budgetary constraints, the US Navy indicated that it would buy only 36 F-35Cs instead of 69 between 2015 and 2020. The USAF will also defer the purchase of four F-35As in 2015, while Marine Corps orders will not change. Defense Secretary Chuck Hagel further indicated that the number of F-35s to be funded between 2014 and 2019 could be further reduced unless Congress revokes the automatic budget cuts programmed for FY2016 and later by the Bipartisan Budget Act of 2013.

The deal for Lot 8 was finalised on 22 November 2014 at a cost of $4.7 Billion.

In April 2015, the US Navy indicated that it was looking at purchasing additional F-18 Super Hornets to fill in a gap in aircraft in service forecast as a result of increasing delays in the F-35 program.

== Level 1 partner ==
=== United Kingdom ===
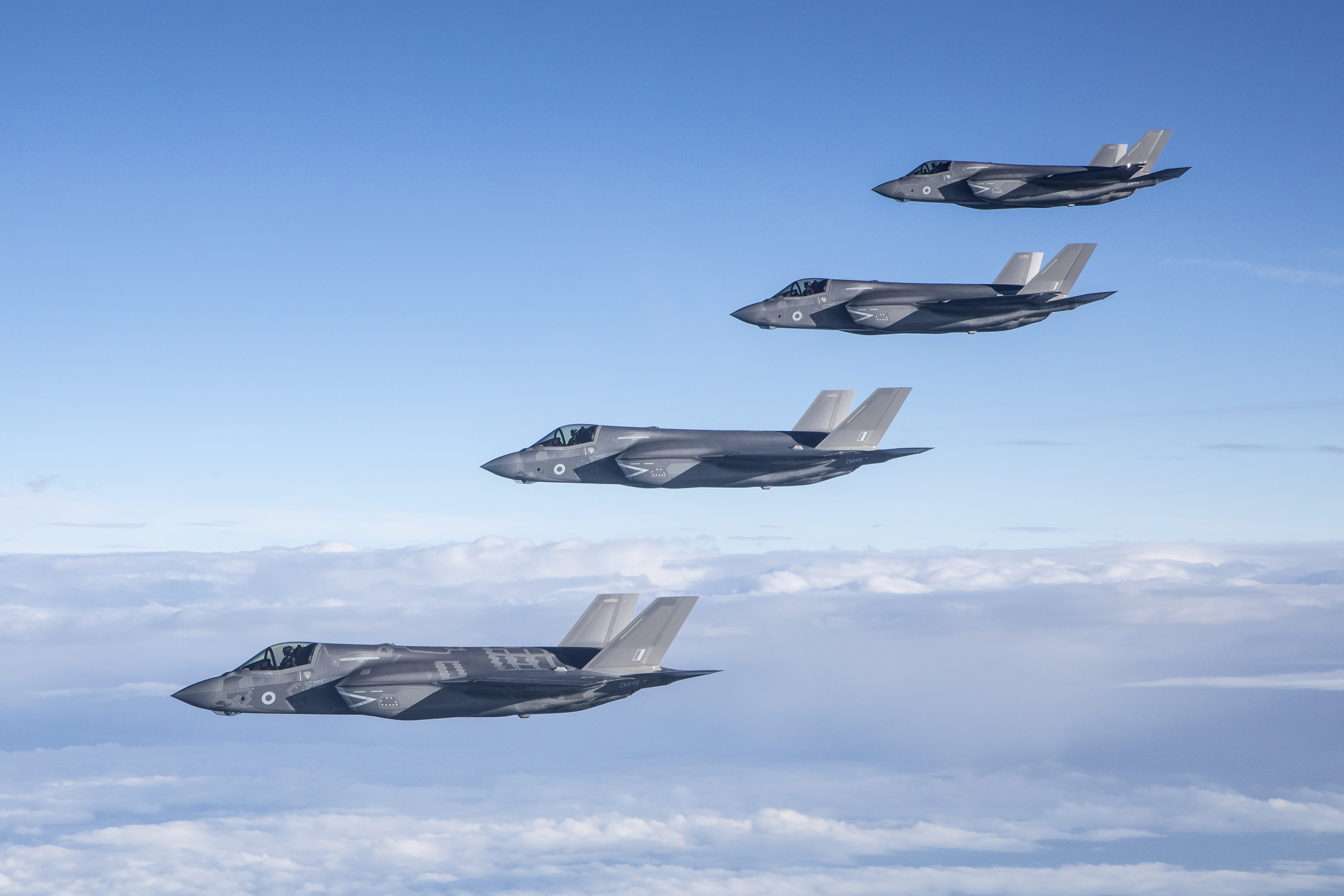
Four British F-35Bs in 2018

In 2006, the United Kingdom was expected to acquire 138 F-35s, down from the 2005 plan for 150 aircraft: 90 for the Royal Air Force; and 60 for the Royal Navy.

The UK became increasingly frustrated by a lack of U.S. commitment to grant access to the technology that would allow the UK to maintain and upgrade its F-35s without U.S. involvement. For five years, British officials sought an ITAR waiver to secure greater technology transfer. Although this had the support of the Bush administration, it was repeatedly blocked by U.S. Representative Henry Hyde, on the grounds that British laws were insufficient to prevent unauthorised transfer of U.S. technology to third parties.

On 27 May 2006, President George W. Bush and Prime Minister Tony Blair announced that "Both governments agree that the UK will have the ability to successfully operate, upgrade, employ, and maintain the Joint Strike Fighter such that the UK retains operational sovereignty over the aircraft." In December 2006, an agreement was signed which met the UK's demands for further participation, i.e., access to software source code and operational sovereignty. The agreement allows "an unbroken British chain of command" for operation of the aircraft.

In 2007, the Ministry of Defence placed orders for two Queen Elizabeth-class aircraft carriers to operate the F-35B variant.

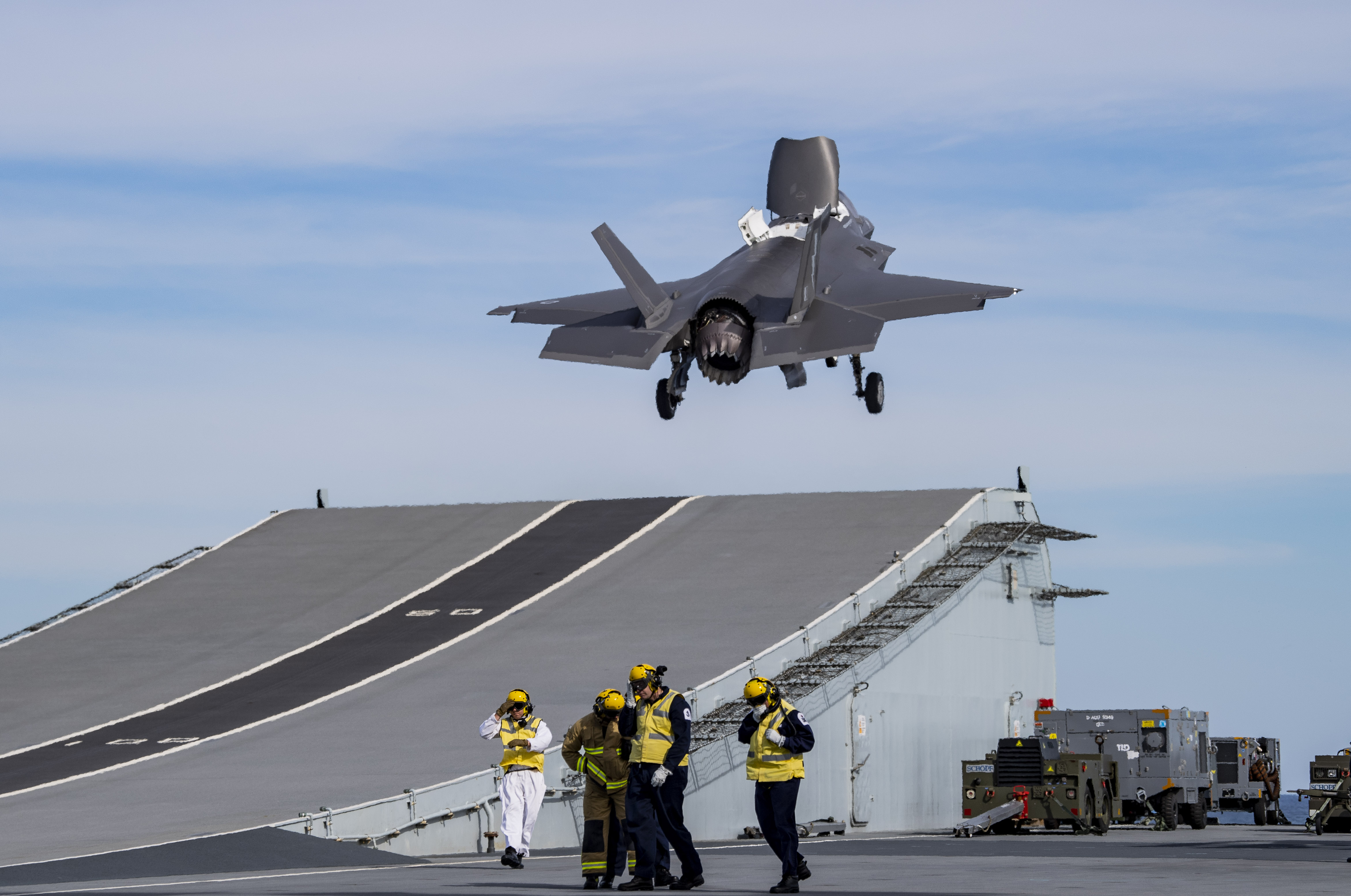
An F-35B taking off from HMS Queen Elizabeth in 2019

On 18 March 2009, Defence Secretary John Hutton announced the MoD had agreed to purchase three test F-35Bs, and on 22 December 2009 financial approval for the purchase of the third aircraft was given.

On 26 January 2010, following over 18 months of simulator training, Squadron Leader Steve Long completed a test flight becoming the first British active duty pilot to fly the F-35.

Speculation mounted in 2009 that the UK government would switch from the F-35B to the F-35C model, with its greater range and payload. The UK would require fewer F-35Cs and save about $25 million for each aircraft ordered. In October 2010, press reports suggested that the Conservative-Liberal Democrat coalition government were considering reducing the order for the F-35 from 138 to an unspecified but lower number as of the 2010 Strategic Defence and Security Review. This was confirmed by a MoD spokeswoman in 2012. The proposed cuts would also close RAF Lossiemouth, chosen as the main operating base for the F-35. On 19 October 2010, Prime Minister David Cameron announced in the Strategic Defence and Security Review that the UK would procure an unspecified number of F-35Cs, to fly from a Queen Elizabeth-class aircraft carrier, instead of the F-35B. This change would require the aircraft carrier to be equipped with catapults and arresting gear.

In January 2012, British Defence Minister Philip Hammond visited the United States to seek clarification about the impact of the new American military strategy on the availability of the F-35 for Britain's new carriers. In May 2012, Hammond announced that the UK coalition government had reverted to the previous government's plan to operate the F-35B STOVL variant, due to rising estimated shipbuilding costs associated with the F-35C, and an earlier estimated in-service date for the F-35B. In July 2012, Hammond stated that an initial 48 F-35Bs would be purchased to equip the carrier fleet, but a final figure of F-35 purchases would not be decided until the Strategic Defence and Security Review in 2015 – it was also suggested that the UK may later purchase F-35A variants to replace the country's Eurofighter Typhoon fleet.

In November 2015, the Chancellor George Osborne announced that the UK would order the full original total of 138 F-35 aircraft to equip the Royal Navy's two new Queen Elizabeth-class aircraft carriers. The aircraft would also be used by the Royal Air Force over time, and be one of the replacements for the Panavia Tornado. It was stated that at least 24 of the aircraft would be available by 2023 for use on board one of the navy's aircraft carriers, thus leaving more time for testing and training before it becomes operational. It was expected that all 138 F-35 aircraft will be in service by the 2030s. At least one permanent F-35 squadron would be stood up sometime around 2018, and expected to increase to two or three squadrons in the 2020s.

The airplane is one of the two main fast jet aircraft operated by the Royal Air Force, the other being the Eurofighter Typhoon. Further acquisition of the F-35 by the Royal Air Force has been criticized due to its possible "outdated" capabilities by the 2030s (when the RAF would seek to begin replacing its Eurofighters) and lack of interoperability of the F-35B variant on the Royal Navy's aircraft carriers. Instead, the Eurofighters may be replaced with the New Generation Fighter (NGF) or the BAE Systems Tempest.

A UK Defence Command paper released on 22 March 2021 removed the commitment to procuring 138 F-35s, stating instead that it will increase the fleet size beyond the 48 F-35Bs already ordered. On 23 March, the First Sea Lord reportedly estimated that the final fleet will total between 60 and 80 aircraft. The U.K.'s original "Level 1" status in the program was said to have expired in 2020.

In April 2022, the Deputy Chief of Defence Staff, Air Marshal Richard Knighton, told the House of Commons Defence Select Committee that the MoD was in discussions to purchase a second tranche of 26 F-35B fighters. Plans for frontline F-35B squadrons had been modified and now envisaged a total of three squadrons (rather than four) each deploying 12-16 aircraft. In surge conditions 24 F-35s might be deployed on the Queen Elizabeth-class carriers but a routine deployment would likely involve 12 aircraft.

In June 2025, the UK government announced plans to amend its F-35 order. As originally envisaged, a total of 138 aircraft, consisting entirely of the F-35B STOVL variant, were to be purchased, and were primarily intended to operate in the maritime strike role from the aircraft carriers of the Royal Navy. Delivery of the first tranche of 48 aircraft was due for completion in 2025, with another 27 to follow in the second tranche of airframes.

In 2025, concerns were raised regarding pressure on the United Kingdom's F-35 fleet due to combat operations, delayed upgrades, and fleet availability, while the government continued plans for a mixed F-35B/F-35A fleet.

But, in June of 2025, the UK indicated that it planned to restore to the RAF a nuclear role that it had not undertaken since the end of the Cold War, with aircraft capable of carrying the nuclear warheads. As a result, only 15 F-35Bs were to be procured as part of the second tranche, with the remaining 12 now to be F-35As. These would operate primarily as part of the RAF's operational conversion unit, freeing F-35Bs from this task, with the nuclear delivery role being additional to this.

Under plans confirmed in the 2025 defence review, the Fleet Air Arm and Royal Air Force had acquired 47 F-35B aircraft by 2026 and were planning to increase to that number to 62 F-35B airframes by 2033. These numbers were somewhat lower than originally envisaged due to a decision made in the review to acquire 12 non-carrier capable F-35A aircraft to serve in training and tactical nuclear-strike roles. The 2026 Defence Investment Plan did not confirm the order or specific timing for 15 additional F-35B aircraft, though it noted that 12 F-35A aircraft would likely be ordered for delivery in the early 2030s.

== Level 2 partners ==
=== Italy ===
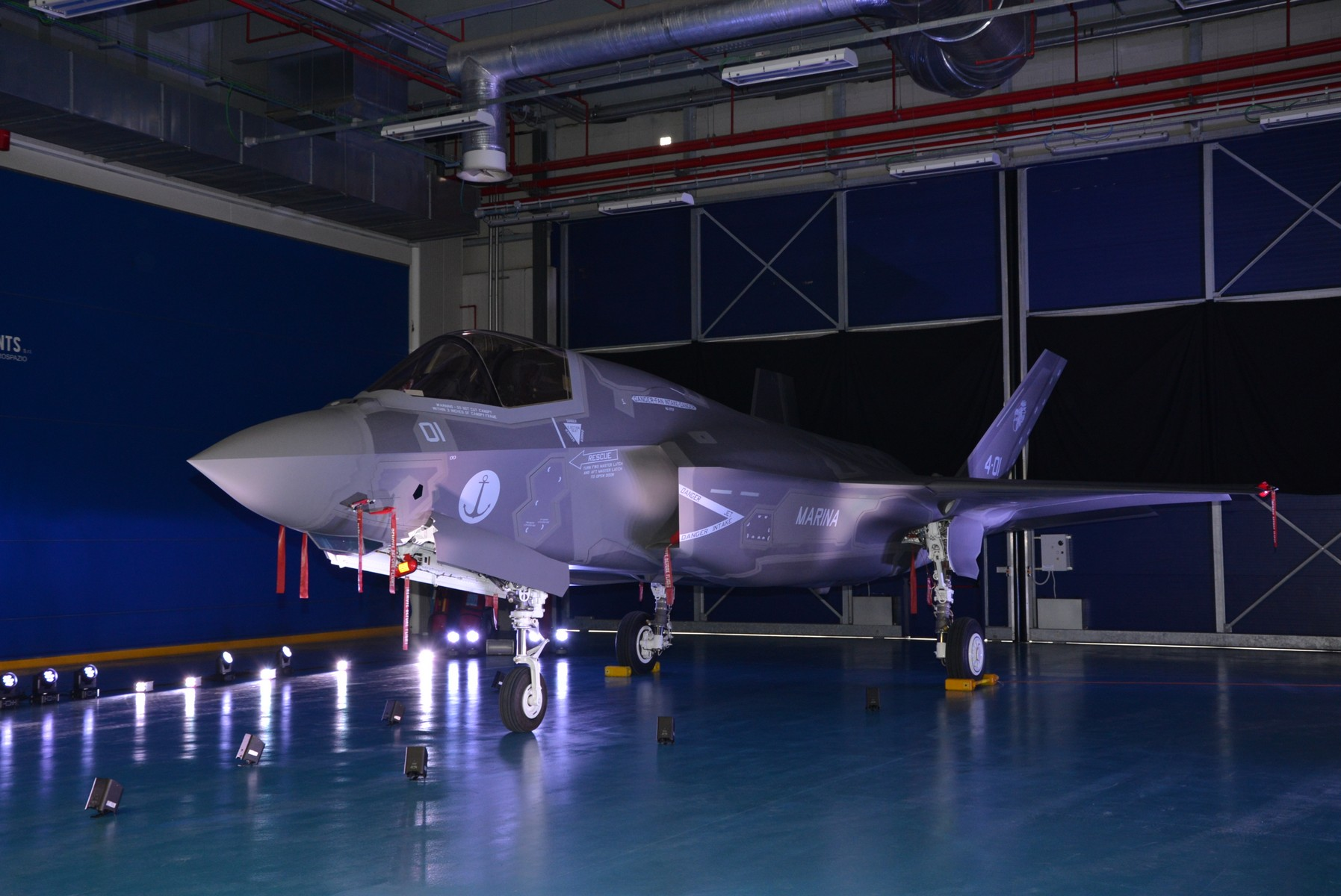
The first Italian F-35B

Italy is the second largest JSF contributing partner after the UK. In October 2008, the Italian government outlined a requirement for 131 F-35s for the Aeronautica Militare and Marina Militare, consisting of 69 F-35As and 62 F-35Bs. Under this plan, the Italian Navy would have received 22 F-35Bs while the Air Force would get 69 F-35A and 40 F-35B STOVL version aircraft. The Navy plans to use the F-35Bs on the new Cavour STOVL carrier.

Alenia Aermacchi will be the second source supplier of the wing box. Under the terms of agreement Alenia Aeronautica is slated to produce more than 1,200 wings for the F-35 for the nine partners, United States, United Kingdom, Netherlands, Turkey, Australia, Canada, Denmark and Norway. Other participation in the program includes work on the electro-optical targeting system, on the electronic-warfare suite, ejection seat, radio, 25 mm gun and DAS systems, performed by Leonardo-Finmeccanica's companies. Avio participated in both the Pratt & Whitney F135 and General Electric/Rolls-Royce F136 powerplant programs.

On 7 October 2008, Italy announced it would not participate in initial F-35 testing and evaluation, and will not purchase test aircraft.

Italy's Air Base of Cameri will be the only Final Assembly and Check Out/Maintenance, Repair, Overhaul & Upgrade (FACO/MRO&U) facility outside the US, for the final assembly of F-35s to be delivered to Italy and the Netherlands, with an estimated cost of $775 million. The FACO could also operate as a regional F-35 maintenance and support center. As of 2015, there are 800 Italians and 30-40 LM personnel at Cameri.

In early February 2012, Corriere della Sera reported that the Italian purchase would be cut back to 100 or at most 110 aircraft, but the defense ministry said at that time that no decision had been made. On 15 February, Defence Minister Giampaolo Di Paola announced that Italy would cut its F-35 order by 41 aircraft from the initially announced 131 to 90 as a result of the country's sovereign debt crisis.

On 26 June 2013, Italy's ruling parties agreed to again seek parliament approval before advancing further in the program. Parliament approved a six-month review of the program by a vote of 381 to 149. On 16 July 2013, the senate agreed to allow the existing purchase to go through, but said they would review any further purchase. The first F-35A assembled in Italy flew from Cameri on 7 September 2015.

In July 2018, after the rise of the Conte Cabinet, it was reported that no more Italian orders for F-35 are expected, and the current order could be cut to save money. In October that year, the Italian government announced it would cut €450 million from its 2019 defense budget. One of the measures taken to achieve this is a slowdown in the purchase of F-35 aircraft to spread out payment. In November 2018, it was reported that the slowdown would reduce Italy's acquisition rate from ten aircraft per year down to six or seven, but still ultimately buying 90 aircraft total. In December 2018, the Italian Defence Ministry reiterated that the government would not reduce the order, and that Italy stands by its decision to procure the F-35, despite conflicting statements by coalition party members in the past.

=== Netherlands ===
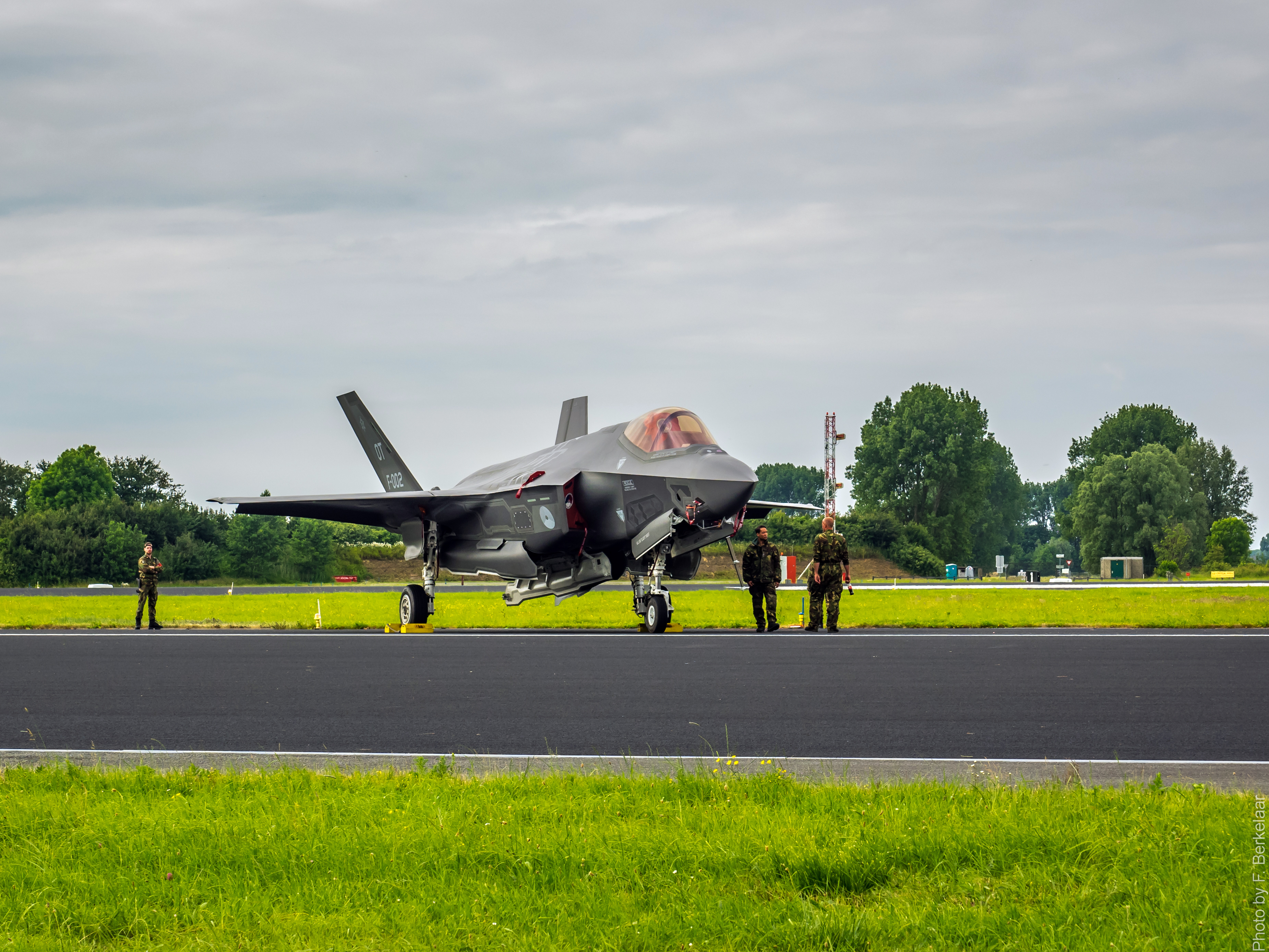
F-002, The second Royal Netherlands Air Force F-35A at Leeuwarden Air Base

The Netherlands had plans to acquire 85 F-35As for the Royal Netherlands Air Force. The aircraft will replace an aging fleet of F-16AMs. The Dutch government had expected that the costs would be €5.5 billion for the initial purchase and €9.1 billion for 30 years of service, which comes down to a lifetime cost of about US$215 million per unit. (Note: The lifetime cost per F-35 unit involved the simple calculation of a US dollar at the euro exchange rate of 1 Euro=1.25-dollar.) (Note: A simple calculation shows that the Dutch government thus expects a maximum investment of 5500/85=65 Million Euro to bring an F-35 into service.) On 19 November 2007, in the Dutch Parliament, the Secretary of Defence was questioned about the JSF delay, technical problems and rising costs. However, on 29 February 2008, the executive council of the Dutch government decided to go ahead with the purchase of two test aircraft, and a memorandum of understanding was signed. On 7 September 2008 Dutch television show "Reporter" reports that counter orders are lagging behind compared to promises and that an active lobby by the Royal Netherlands Air Force has manipulated the Dutch government into participating in the project.

In 2010, the Dutch parliament voted to cancel its order for the first test series. Because there was only a caretaker government at that time, Defence Minister Van Middelkoop stated he can and will not honor the wishes of the parliament, but that the next government should decide on the issue. The next defence Minister Hans Hillen planned to continue the purchase in the face of budget cuts that will see thousands of defense employees go as well as the sell off of Dutch military aircraft and ships, in order to maintain Dutch industrial participation in the F-35 program. On 20 April 2011 the newly elected Dutch parliament reversed the vote by its predecessor and voted to purchase a second test F-35.

In December 2010, Defence Minister Hans Hillen said that he had "great difficulty" with a cost increase of 20% over what the Netherlands had budgeted and that he would work with the UK and Norway on the issue.

On 8 April 2011, the Netherlands agreed to buy a second test aircraft, and signed a deal to purchase it at the end of the month. Later that month, Dutch defence minister Hans Hillen suggested that their purchase level would be lower than 85, as the plan was to replace F-16s on a one for one basis and Dutch F-16 numbers had already dropped to 68. Lockheed was confident that the Netherlands will purchase the full order of 85 F-35 fighters. However, the Dutch Minister of Defence announced in March 2013 that the test program would be stopped until further notice and that the purchase of the F-35 was not at all certain. The two F-35s on order will be placed in storage until a decision is made.

Considerations of some Dutch politicians to buy alternatives such as Saab AB's Gripen, Boeing F/A-18 E/F Super Hornet or the EADS Eurofighter, caused the US DoD to suggest (in April 2013) these options would cost more in the long run. In 2013 the Netherlands Court of Audit found that increasing per-unit costs of the F-35 had driven the number of aircraft that could be afforded below the minimum level needed to fulfill NATO requirements. In September the Dutch government stated a commitment to replace the F-16 with F-35. The anticipated number is 37, and the budget is 4.5 billion euros ($6.01 billion) for the warplanes and an additional 270 million euros per year in operating costs.

On 17 September 2013 the Dutch government announced that it will purchase 37 JSF fighters for a purchase price of around 4.5 billion euro.

In January 2014, the Dutch defence and foreign affairs ministers revealed that their F-35s could be used for delivery of nuclear weapons. The previous year Parliament support no nuclear role for the F-35 and the ministers still support disarmament, but they say the Netherlands still has a nuclear role "for the time being" due to their role within NATO.

In September 2018, the Ministry of Defence removed the cap of €4.5 billion allocated to the procurement of the F-35, a political decision that was reached in 2013 as it was a demand from the coalition partner Labour Party. The potentially enlarged budget would allow the Royal Netherlands Air Force to procure the initially planned 67 aircraft spread over 4 squadrons. In December 2018, Dutch Minister of Defence Ank Bijleveld stated that the Netherlands is investing in its armed forces to grow towards and eventually reach the NATO 2% of GDP defense spending norm. In this statement, minister Bijleveld also stated that NATO desires a third Dutch F-35 squadron, which equals to 15 aircraft in addition to the current order of 37.

On 30 May 2022, as part of bringing the Dutch defense budget to 2% of GDP NATO standards, the Ministry of Defense decided on an additional purchase of 6 F-35s resulting in a total order of 52.

== Level 3 partners ==
=== Australia ===
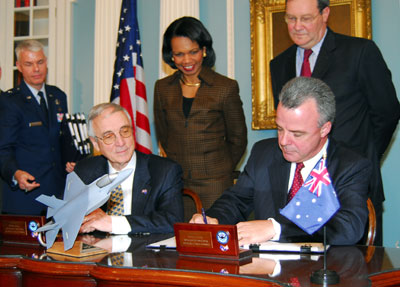
Australia's Minister for Defence Dr. Brendan Nelson signing the JSF Production, Sustainment and Follow-on Development Memorandum of Understanding in December 2006

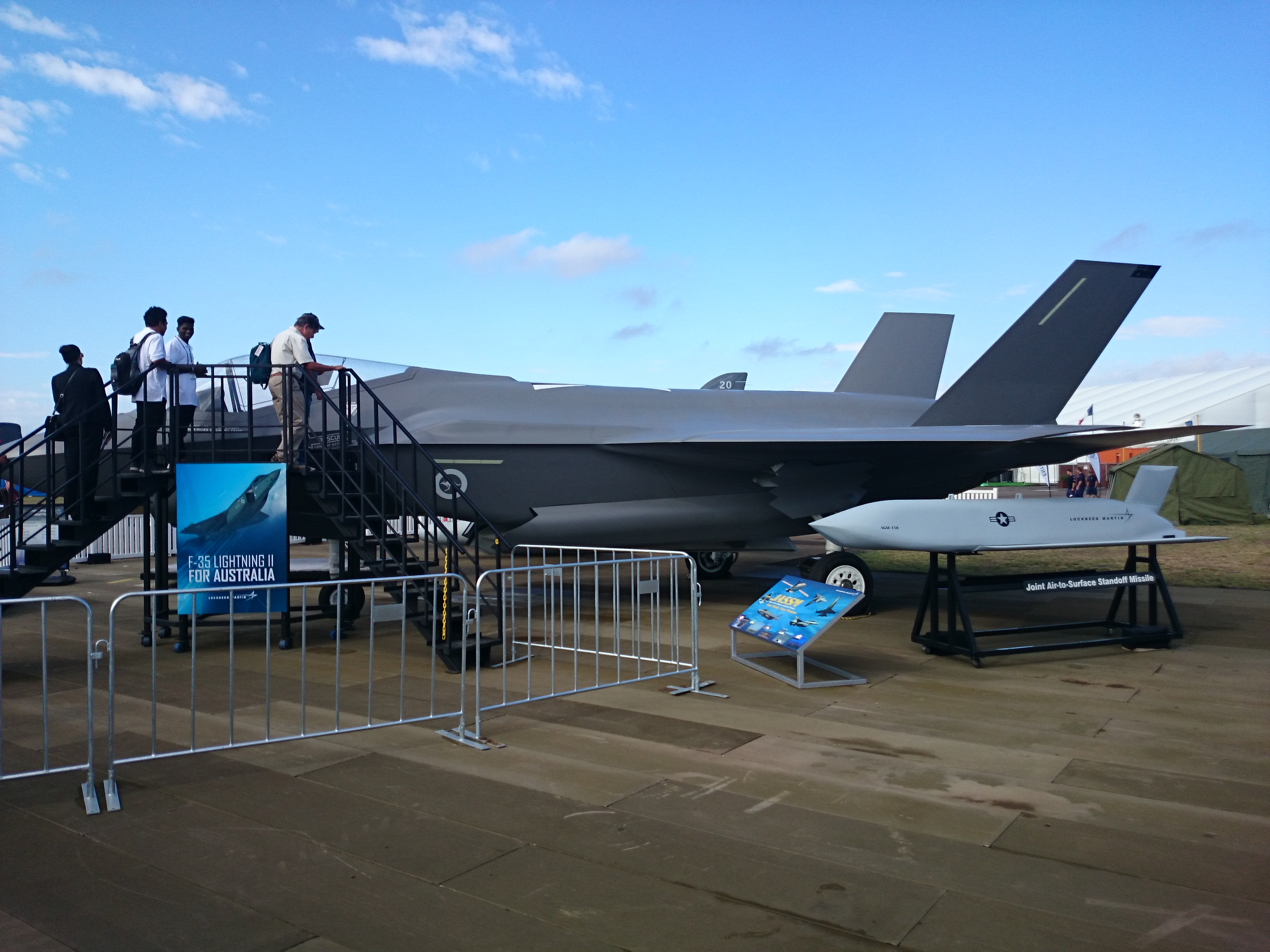
Australian F-35 Mockup, 2015

Australia is participating in the F-35's development (also known as AIR600 Phase 2A/2B), and expects that overall, 72 or more F-35As will be ordered to replace the Royal Australian Air Force's (RAAF's) F/A-18 Hornet aircraft. The government of Australia announced that it would buy into the F-35's development on 22 June 2002. This decision ended the competition to replace Australia's F/A-18 and F-111 aircraft before it formally began, with other aircraft manufacturers being advised that it would not be worth submitting proposals. The program is intended to replace the Air Force's McDonnell Douglas F/A-18 Hornet fleet. The government argued that joining the F-35 program at an early stage would allow Australia to influence the F-35's development, provide the government with information on the aircraft's suitability, and generate savings of over $600 million if an order for F-35s is eventually placed. Australia formally signed up to the F-35 "systems development and demonstration phase" as a Level 3 participant on 30 October 2002.

In 2002, the Howard government ignored military advice that it was too soon to join the F-35 program, and directed the "Air 6000" program to settle on the JSF. The expected cost was $28 million per fighter in 1994 US dollars.

In November 2006, declaring satisfaction with the F-35's progress to date, the government gave 'first-pass' initial approval to the project under which F-35s will be acquired, deferring to late 2008 a decision on whether to actually order the aircraft. Following this initial approval, on 13 December 2006 Australia signed the JSF Production, Sustainment and Follow-on Development Memorandum of Understanding, which commits Australia to the next phase of the F-35's development. In October 2006 the deputy chief of the Air Force, Air Vice Marshal John Blackburn, publicly stated that the RAAF had considered suitable aircraft which could be acquired if the F-35 was delayed, but that such aircraft were not believed to be necessary on the basis of the F-35 program's progress at the time. Concerns over the F-35 delivery schedule developed in Australia during 2007. In February the defence minister announced that a risk mitigation strategy, which involved obtaining F/A-18F Hornets, was being developed to prevent a gap in the RAAF's air combat capability if the F-35 program was delayed. This strategy was adopted, and an order for 24 F/A-18Fs was announced on 6 March 2007. The first aircraft was delivered in 2009 and the first squadron was declared operational in December 2010.

Following the 2007 Australian Federal Election, the new Australian Labor Party Government launched an inquiry into the replacement of the RAAF's air combat capability. The party had expressed concerns over the F-35's adequacy while it was in opposition, and proposed acquiring F-22s to replace or supplement the RAAF's F-35 force. An approach was made to the U.S. Government for F-22s in early 2008, but was not successful as these aircraft are not available for export. In April 2008 it was reported that the air combat review had found that the F-35 was the most suitable aircraft for Australia. In 2011 leaked documents revealed that the review and the attempt to purchase the F-22 were simply to satisfy domestic politics in Australia and no serious consideration had been given to any aircraft other than the F-35.

In October 2008 it was reported that the Australian Government may order 75 F-35s instead of the 100 originally planned, due to the impact of the 2008 financial crisis and a large long-term funding gap in the Defence budget. The Government's Defence white paper released in April 2009 argued for a purchase of up to 100 F-35s, however.

There has been much debate in Australia over whether the F-35 is the most suitable aircraft for the RAAF. It has been claimed that the F-35's performance is inferior to Russian-built fighters operated by countries near Australia (such as the Su-27 and Su-30 in Indonesia), that it cannot meet the RAAF's long-range strike requirement, and that further delays to the F-35 program may result in the RAAF experiencing a shortage of combat aircraft. The RAAF has stated that it believes that the F-35 will meet Australia's needs, and both of Australia's major political parties currently support the development and purchase of the aircraft (though differences remain on the deadline and the number of aircraft). Former defence minister Joel Fitzgibbon has charged the defence chiefs with an obsession for the JSF.

On 21 August 2009, it was reported that the RAAF would get two F-35s for testing in 2014 and that the initial squadron would be delayed until 2017. On 11 September 2009, Air Marshall Mark Binskin said that a fourth squadron of F-35s for the RAAF would be imperative.

On 25 November 2009, Australia committed to placing a first order for 14 aircraft at a cost of A$3.2 billion, with deliveries to begin in 2014. However, in May 2012, it was announced that the purchase of twelve F-35As from the initial order were being deferred to 2014 as part of wider ADF budget cuts in order to balance the Federal Government budget for the 2012-13 financial year.

Air Marshal Geoff Brown, the Chief of Air Force, has said that "anything less than 100 JSFs severely limits the options available to government and only provides a boutique capability", and that the fighter is necessary for the RAAF to be able to keep up with the aircraft other air forces in Australia's region are expected to operate in the 2020s.

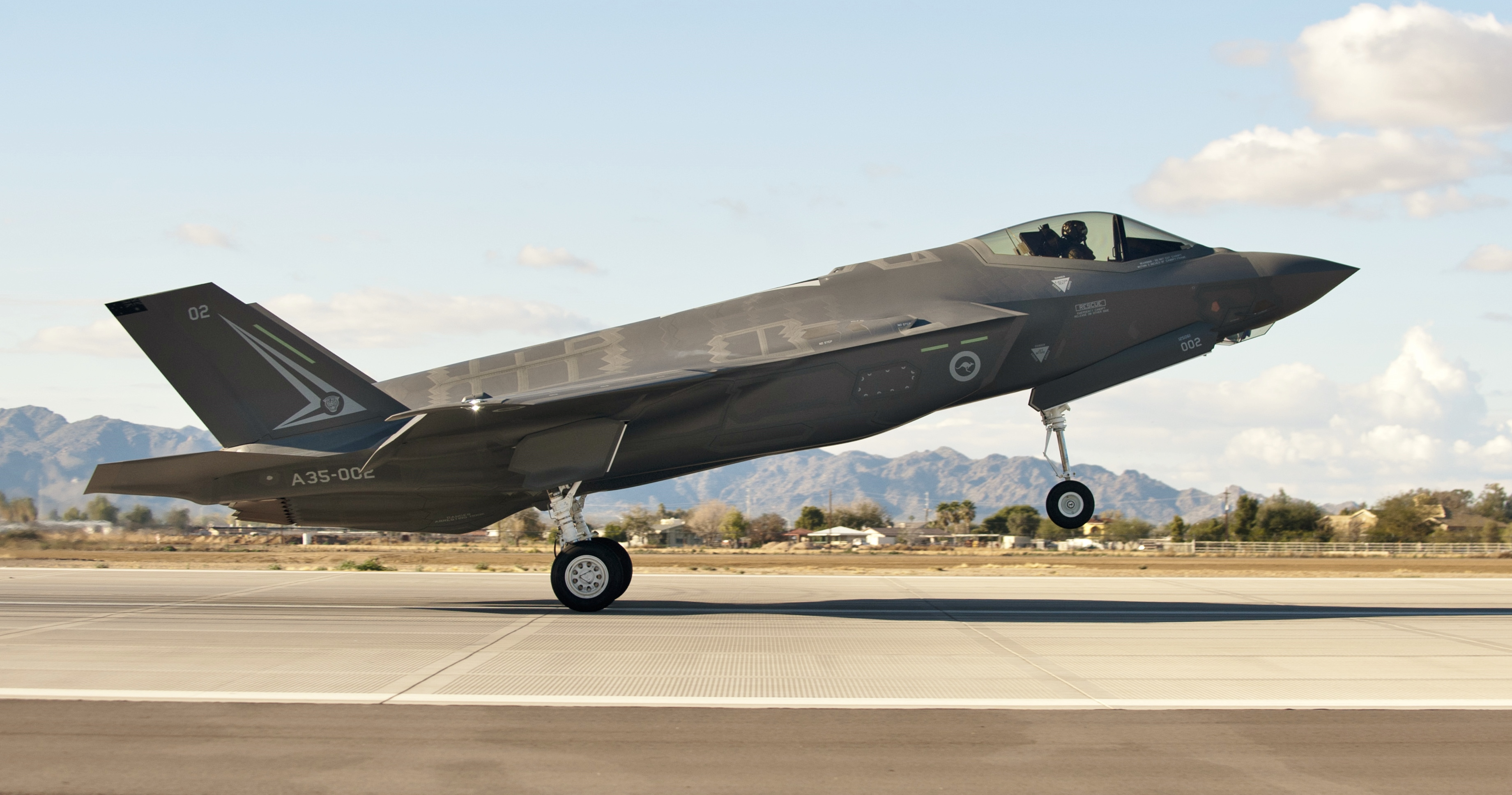
One of Australia's first two F-35s in December 2014

The construction of the Canberra-class amphibious vessels for the Royal Australian Navy has led to suggestions from some quarters that the RAN should procure a number of the F-35B STOVL version to operate from these ships. However, while cross-decking with other nations may well occur, the RAN has stated that the operation of Australian fixed wing aircraft is unlikely. In 2014 Defence Minister David Johnston said that the government was considering the purchase of F-35Bs to use aboard the ships. Tony Abbott directed that the team developing a new defence white paper consider the issue. This assessment found that the cost of modifying the ships to operate F-35Bs would be very high, and the idea was rejected before the completion of the White Paper.

On 23 April 2014, Australia confirmed the purchase of 58 F-35A Lightning II fighters in a US$11.5 billion deal. The 58 fighter order is the second tranche of the Australian Defence Force's Air 6000 Phase 2A/2B new air combat capability (NACC) project, with a previous order of 14 F-35s being the first tranche. The 72 F-35s replaced the RAAF's fleet of 71 F/A-18A/B Hornets and supplemented the country's F/A-18F Super Hornet and EA-18G Growler fleets. The first four F-35s were delivered to Australia in 2018, with initial operating capability being reached in 2020. A Phase 2C tranche of the plan is to purchase 28 more planes to replace the Air Force's 24 Super Hornets. Although Super Hornets were bought as a bridging capability until the arrival of the F-35, delays in the JSF program will keep the Super Hornets and Growlers flying for 20 years, with a decision regarding Phase 2C deferred until the early 2020s. The purchase will be in line with previous defense budget planning.

Australia's first F-35A, designated AU-1 by Lockheed and A35-001 by the RAAF, made its first flight on 29 September 2014 at the company's Fort Worth, Texas facility, flying for two hours. AU-1 and AU-2 will be transferred to the USAF training school at Luke Air Force Base in Arizona in early 2015. RAAF F-35s will remain at Luke AFB until 2018, when they will be delivered to Australia for national-specific operational test and evaluation work.

Australia started an A$950 million program in 2015 to provide better security for its F-35 bases.

At the end of 2020, The RAAF had reported that 60 out of the 72 aircraft ordered had been delivered, with the final 12 to be delivered by the end of 2023. In February 2024, 63 F-35A are already delivered to RAAF, and the last 9 are to be delivered in the second half of the year. Currently, the Royal Australian Air Force maintains three combat squadrons of the F-35A throughout Australia, one at RAAF Base Tindal, plus two and a training unit at RAAF Base Williamtown.

Timeline:

- 2014: Australia's first F-35, known as AU-1 is delivered from Fort Worth, Texas
- 2015: First Australian pilot goes through F-35 training at Eglin Air Force Base, Florida
- 2017: F-35 makes Australian public debut at Avalon Airshow
- 2018: F-35 Training Center is stood up at RAAF Base Williamtown
- 2018: First aircraft arrives for permanent basing at RAAF Base Williamtown
- 2020: Australia declares Initial Operating Capacity (IOC)
- 2021: Establishment of Williamtown Depot capability
- 2021: First aircraft arrives for permanent basing at RAAF Base Tindal
- 2023: Asia-Pacific Regional Warehouse IOC
- 2024: Final F-35 lands in Australia

=== Canada ===
Canada has been involved in the Joint Strike Fighter Program from its beginning, investing US$10 million to be an "informed partner" during the evaluation process. Once Lockheed Martin was selected as the primary contractor for the JSF program, Canada elected to become a level 3 participant, along with Norway, Denmark, Turkey and Australia. An additional US$100 million from the Canadian Department of National Defence (DND) over 10 years and another $50 million from Industry Canada were dedicated in 2002, making them an early participant of the JSF program.

On 16 July 2010, the Canadian government announced that it would buy 65 F-35s to replace the existing 80 CF-18s for $16B (with all ancillary costs included) with deliveries planned for 2016.

The intention to sign a sole-sourced, untendered F-35 contract and the government's refusal to provide detailed costing became one of the major causes of a finding of contempt of Parliament and the subsequent defeat of Stephen Harper's Conservative government through a non-confidence vote on 25 March 2011. This directly led to the F-35 purchase becoming an issue in the 2011 federal election, in which Harper's Conservatives won an increased number of seats to form a majority government.

On 19 October 2015, the Liberal Party of Canada under Justin Trudeau won a large majority in part on a campaign promise to not purchase the F-35, but instead an aircraft more suited to Canada's defence requirements. However, the new Defence Minister has refused to rule out the F-35 in a new procurement competition.

On 28 March 2022, the Government of Canada announced that the competition had placed the F-35A first and planned to buy 88 of them. Under procurement rules, the government will now enter into negotiations with Lockheed Martin for the purchase and if an acceptable agreement is not reached then negotiations for the second place Saab Gripen will begin.

In December 2022, the government placed an order for an initial batch of 16 F-35As, securing delivery positions prior to the year end.

On 9 January 2023, the Government of Canada announced the purchase of 88 F-35As, at a total cost of $19 billion Canadian Dollars. First aircraft are to arrive in 2026, first squadron will be operational in 2029 and full fleet operational between 2032 and 2034.

=== Denmark ===
Denmark has joined the Joint Strike Fighter program as a Level 3 partner in 2002. The Royal Danish Air Force is replacing its fleet of 48 aging F-16 fighters with F-35As.

Denmark's members of parliament were not expected to vote on a purchase of the F-35A before 2014, and were considering alternatives such as the JAS 39 Gripen NG and the F/A-18E/F Super Hornet, while the consortium behind the Eurofighter Typhoon withdrew in 2007.

As of 2010, a Royal Danish Air Force F-16BM (ET 210) is stationed at Edwards Air Force Base for flight testing of the F-35. The Danish test pilot Lieutenant Colonel Casper Børge Nielsen is part of the Joint Strike Fighter program.

On 13 March 2013, Denmark restarted their selection process for 30 new fighter aircraft. Candidates include the two-seated F/A-18F Super Hornet, and Eurofighter Typhoon, with the F-35A remaining as a candidate.

On 9 June 2016, the Danish defence committee agreed to purchase 27 F-35As to succeed the F-16 for US$3 billion.

In September 2016, Boeing, the builder of the F/A-18E/F Super Hornet, indicated that they would take legal action against the Danish decision to buy the F-35A, indicating that data used was flawed. In March 2018, Boeing lost the case with the court stating "The court has found that the authorities' decisions on refusal of access to the documents are legal and valid."

In October 2025, the Danish government decided to purchase an additional 16 aircraft. In total, the Danish Air Force will have 43 F-35As.

In May 2019, Danish Minister of Defence Claus Hjort Frederiksen stated that Denmark is considering stationing fighter jets in Greenland to counter Russia's expanding military presence in the Arctic region. In an additional interview with Ritzau, the minister said that to provide air defense of Greenland would require at least four fighter planes, which would require Denmark to make an additional purchase.

In January 2020, Lockheed Martin announced that assembly had begun on L-001, the first of 27 F-35As destined for the Royal Danish Air Force.

=== Norway ===
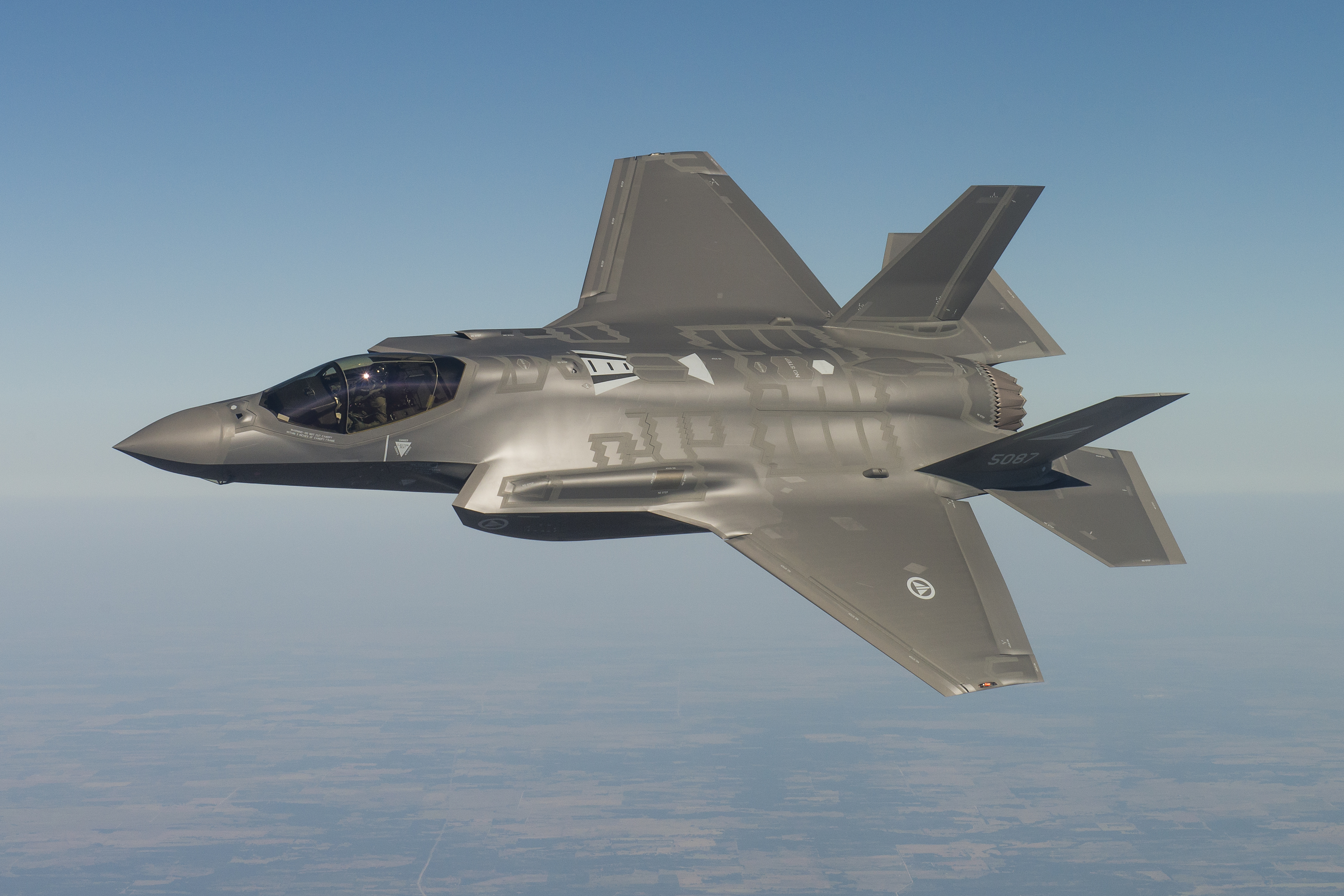
AM-1 - 5087, the First Royal Norwegian Air Force F-35A in flight testing near Fort Worth, Texas

Norway participates in the F-35 program as a Level 3 partner in the system development and demonstration phase, with a view to enabling its industry to compete for industrial opportunities. Norwegian National Deputy Rune Fagerli, the country's sole representative on the Joint Strike Fighter program, told SPACE.com that the Norwegian Royal Ministry of Defence has pledged $125 million in preparation to replace a fleet of F-16 jets that have about 12 years left of operation. "By getting involved here on the ground level, we can try and address the needs of Norway into this capable fighter early," said Fagerli, a colonel. For example, Norwegian F-16s are fitted with drag chutes because of wet, slippery runways. Likewise, international cooperation in aircraft development could also yield aircraft from cooperating nations that fit well together during combat. Fagerli also mentioned that Norwegian pilots currently fly missions over Afghanistan in F-16s alongside Danish and Dutch aviators.

Norway has several times threatened to put their support on hold unless substantial guarantees for an increased industrial share is provided. Despite this Norway has signed all the Memoranda of Understanding, including the latest one detailing the future production phase of the JSF program. They have, however, indicated that they will increase and strengthen their cooperation with both competitors of the JSF, the Typhoon and the Gripen. Norway has delayed a decision on the purchase of four training F-35s until later in 2011.

The F-35 was evaluated along with JAS 39 Gripen by the Norwegian Future Combat Aircraft Capability Project as a replacement for the F-16s. On 20 November 2008, the government released a statement saying it will support buying F-35s for the Royal Norwegian Air Force instead of the Gripen NG. The government's reasoning for choosing the F-35 over Gripen was that only the U.S. aircraft supposedly fulfilled the operational requirements, and that it was allegedly offered at a more competitive price than the Swedish fighter. This has been strongly criticized by Saab, saying that Norway made errors when calculating the cost for Gripen NG vs the cost for the JSF.

The Norwegian Air Force has decided to develop the Joint Strike Missile for the F-35 and other aircraft.

In December 2010, leaked United States diplomatic cables revealed that the U.S. decided to delay a request by Sweden for an AESA radar for the Gripen until after Norway had announced their decision to buy the F-35. The same cables indicated that Norwegian consideration of the Gripen "was just a show" and that Norway had decided to purchase the F-35 as a result of "high-level political pressure" from the US. Following the successful sale of the F-35 to Norway, U.S. officials compiled a "lessons learned" memo that included a list of tactics for future sales to other countries. These included using the active involvement of the local U.S. embassy and its ambassador to market the aircraft, coordinating sales strategies with Lockheed Martin and using diplomatic events to specifically talk about the F-35. These events could include ambassadorial luncheons with national people of influence as invited guests. The documents indicate that U.S. officials were attempting to make the sale "without appearing to bully or attempt to force a decision".

In June 2011, the Socialist Left party called for a probe into the rising costs of the jets.

Like Canada, Norway also needs to use satellite communications for operations north of the Arctic Circle, a capability not to be delivered with the first batch of aircraft.

On 24 November 2011, Norwegian officials estimated the life cycle costs for 52 F-35A to be $40 billion, in a hearing in the House of Commons of Canada.

On 14 June 2012, Norway placed an order for its first two aircraft, after receiving a promise of American support to integrate the Joint Strike Missile on the F-35. The number of aircraft ordered grew to 16 by October 2013.

On 22 September 2015, the first Norwegian F-35A was rolled out in Fort Worth, Texas. The first two examples for Norway are scheduled to be delivered to the Royal Norwegian Air Force later in 2015, and will be based at Luke Air Force Base, Arizona, where they will be used for Norwegian and partner country pilot training.

Norway received its first three F-35s in-country in November 2017, reached initial operating capability in November 2019, and scrambled its F-35s for the first time in response to two Russian Tupolev Tu-142 and a Mikoyan MiG-31 passing near Norwegian airspace in March 2020.

=== Turkey ===
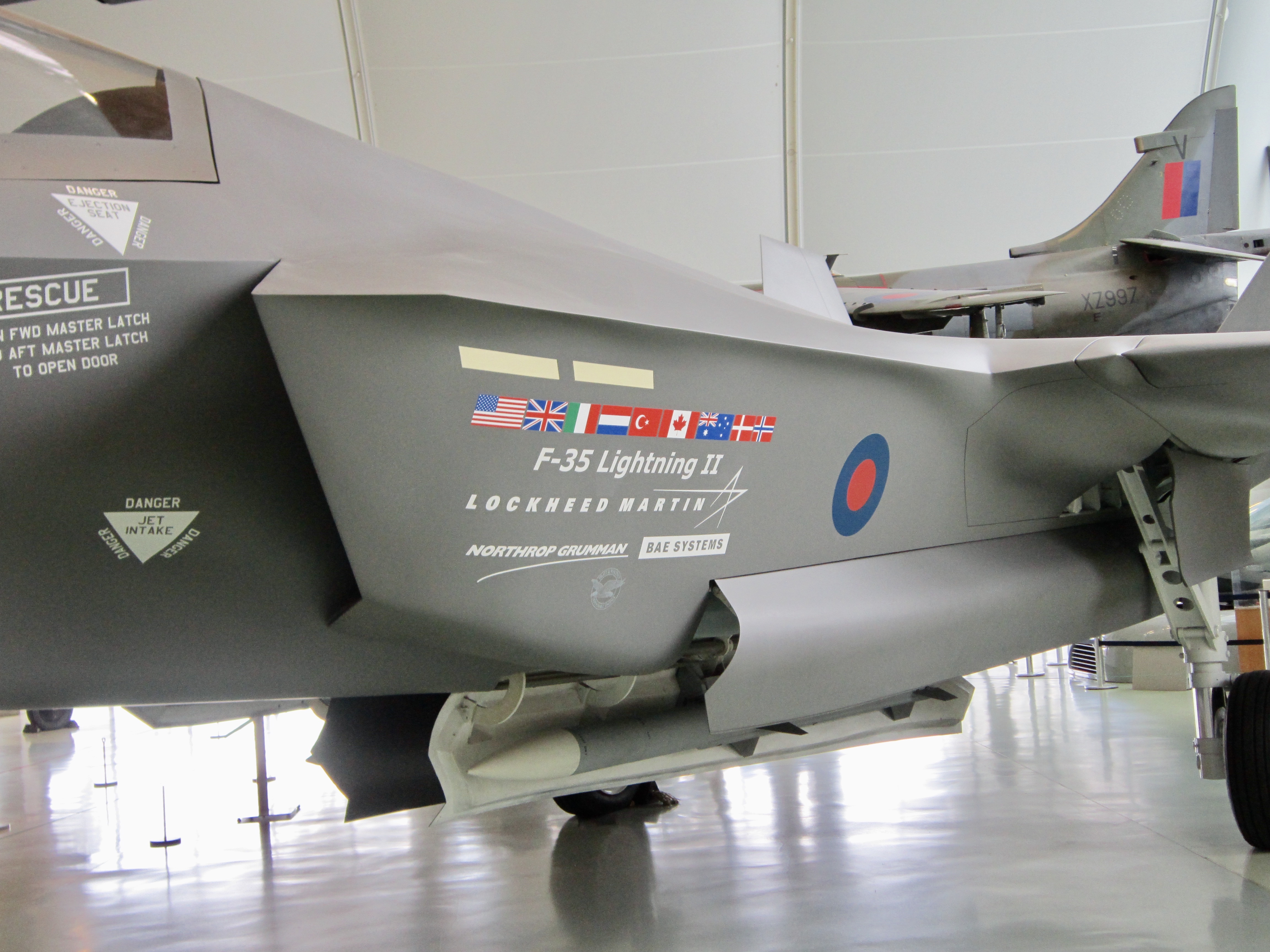
A British F-35 Mockup at RAF Museum, Hendon, featuring a Turkish flag before their removal from the program.

On 12 July 2002, Turkey became the seventh international partner in the JSF Project, joining the United Kingdom, Italy, the Netherlands, Canada, Denmark and Norway. On 25 January 2007, Turkey signed a memorandum of understanding (MoU) for involvement in F-35 production. The Turkish Air Force is planning to initially order 116 F-35A "CTOL/Air Force versions" at a reported cost of $11 billion. In October 2009, Murad Bayar, head of the Undersecretariat for Defense Industries, has said that Turkey may increase its order to 120 aircraft instead of purchasing Eurofighter Typhoons.

The plan is that the F-35 will be produced under license in Turkey by Turkish Aerospace Industries (TAI). TAI is one of the two international suppliers to Northrop Grumman (the other being Terma in Denmark). A Letter of Intent (LOI) was signed between TAI and Northrop Grumman ISS (NGISS) International on 6 February 2007. With the LOI, TAI became the second source for the F-35 center fuselage. The number of center fuselages to be produced by TAI will depend on the number of F-35s Turkey procures and the number of F-35s produced worldwide. On 10 December 2007, TAI was authorized by Northrop Grumman to commence fabricating access doors and composite parts for the first two F-35 production aircraft. These components are used in the F-35 center fuselage, a major section of the aircraft being produced by Northrop Grumman, a principal member of the Lockheed Martin-led F-35 global industry team.

Northrop Grumman currently produces all F-35 center fuselages at its F-35 assembly facility in Palmdale, California. After 2013, TAI will assemble the F-35 under license from Lockheed Martin Corporation, as was the case with the F-16 program.

By January 2011 there were indications that Turkey was reconsidering its participation in the F-35 program and its procurement of the aircraft. Political friction between Turkey and the US resulted in the US refusing to ship or delaying shipments of F-16 parts to Turkey over relations with Israel and Turkish officials are concerned that similar problems will make F-35 production and support of the 100 F-35s it has planned to buy non-viable. Rising costs in the F-35 program are also a factor and Turkey is considering developing its own fighter instead in cooperation with other nations. However Defense Minister Vecdi Gonul, has said that Turkey may buy as many as 116 of the Joint Strike Fighter.

Turkey, like other partner nations, has complained about the United States refusal to share the software source code for the F-35. On 24 March 2011 Turkey announced it is placing its order for 100 jets on hold due to the ongoing source code refusal issue. Defense Minister Vecdi Gönül said that the negotiations for access to the F-35 source codes, including codes that can be used to control the aircraft remotely, had not yielded "satisfactory results" and that under these conditions Turkey could not accept the aircraft.

In April 2012, Turkey suggested that program costs could be reduced by outsourcing more production to Turkish defense and aerospace companies, which operate with lower labour costs compared to their counterparts in the U.S. and other partner countries of the project.

Despite the software dispute, Turkey agreed in principle to order two F-35As in January 2012. However, this decision was postponed during the SSIK meeting in January 2013 due to the technical problems with the aircraft and the uncertainties over the rising costs. Turkey's first F-35s are now due to be delivered in 2017, as opposed to 2015. On 6 May 2014, Turkey approved an initial order for two F-35s after a 15-month delay. They will be manufactured in the Block 3F configuration. Turkey is to take delivery of 10 aircraft per year after they enter service in 2018, with 100 F-35s total on order. The country has invested $195 million in the program since 1999 and total program cost is expected to reach $16 billion.

In January 2015 Turkey ordered a further four F-35s, for a total of six.

On 30 June 2018, Turkey received its first F-35 at Lockheed Martin facilities in Fort Worth, Texas. The first aircraft, with tail number 18-0001, was to be assigned to Luke Air Force Base for pilot training. On 29 August 2018, a Turkish pilot carried out the first flight with an F-35 as part of training in the U.S. In total, six aircraft, given code numbers 18-0001 to 18-0006, were delivered to Luke AFB, where Turkish pilots received training until 2019.

==== Removal from program ====
On 18 June 2018, the U.S. Senate passed a bill blocking the transfer of F-35 fighter jets to Turkey. The prohibition was established due to concerns over Turkey's intent to procure the Russian S-400 air defence system, which would allegedly put the secrets of the F-35 at risk. In August 2018, U.S. President Donald Trump signed the bill, which blocked the transfer of F-35 fighter jets to Turkey. Despite the suspension of deliveries, the F-35 Joint Program Office claimed on 21 August, that it would execute the program according to existing plans. Another bill was passed by the US Senate on 23 August, which prohibited any spending related to the transfer of F-35s to Turkey until it was certified that Turkey would not purchase nor accept delivery of the Russian S-400 air defence system. In early April 2019, it was reported that delivery of F-35 jets to Turkey was suspended due to Turkey's decision to continue procuring the S-400 air defence system. On 10 April 2019, Turkish Foreign Minister reiterated that the S-400 purchase was going on as planned and suggested that Turkey could also look towards acquiring Russian jets, namely the Su-34 and Su-57, if the F-35 deal were to fall through. In early May 2019, it was reported that the Pentagon was looking to move manufacturing of parts and equipment of the F-35 out of Turkey. On 18 May 2019, the Turkish President announced that Turkey would jointly produce the S-500 missile system with Russia. In June 2019, it was reported that the United States had decided to stop training additional Turkish pilots on the F-35. Soon after, it was reported that training of all Turkish pilots was halted.

On 17 July 2019, following the delivery of Russian S-400 air defence systems, the United States announced that Turkey would be removed from the F-35 program. Besides the ban on training of pilots and delivery of the aircraft, the move would also include removing Turkey from the supply chain. Although Turkey has since been formally removed from the program, U.S. Defense officials stated in June 2020 that Turkey would still manufacture key fuselage and engine parts through 2022, as existing manufacturing contracts will still be honored to completion, and to prevent "costly, disruptive and wasteful contract terminations".

The six delivered F-35s remain in storage at Luke Air Force Base. The United States has yet to settle compensation surrounding the $1.4 billion that Turkey paid for the program. In 2024, the US announced that if Turkey were to give up its S-400 systems, it would be permitted back into the F-35 program.

== Security Cooperative Participants (SCP) ==
=== Israel ===
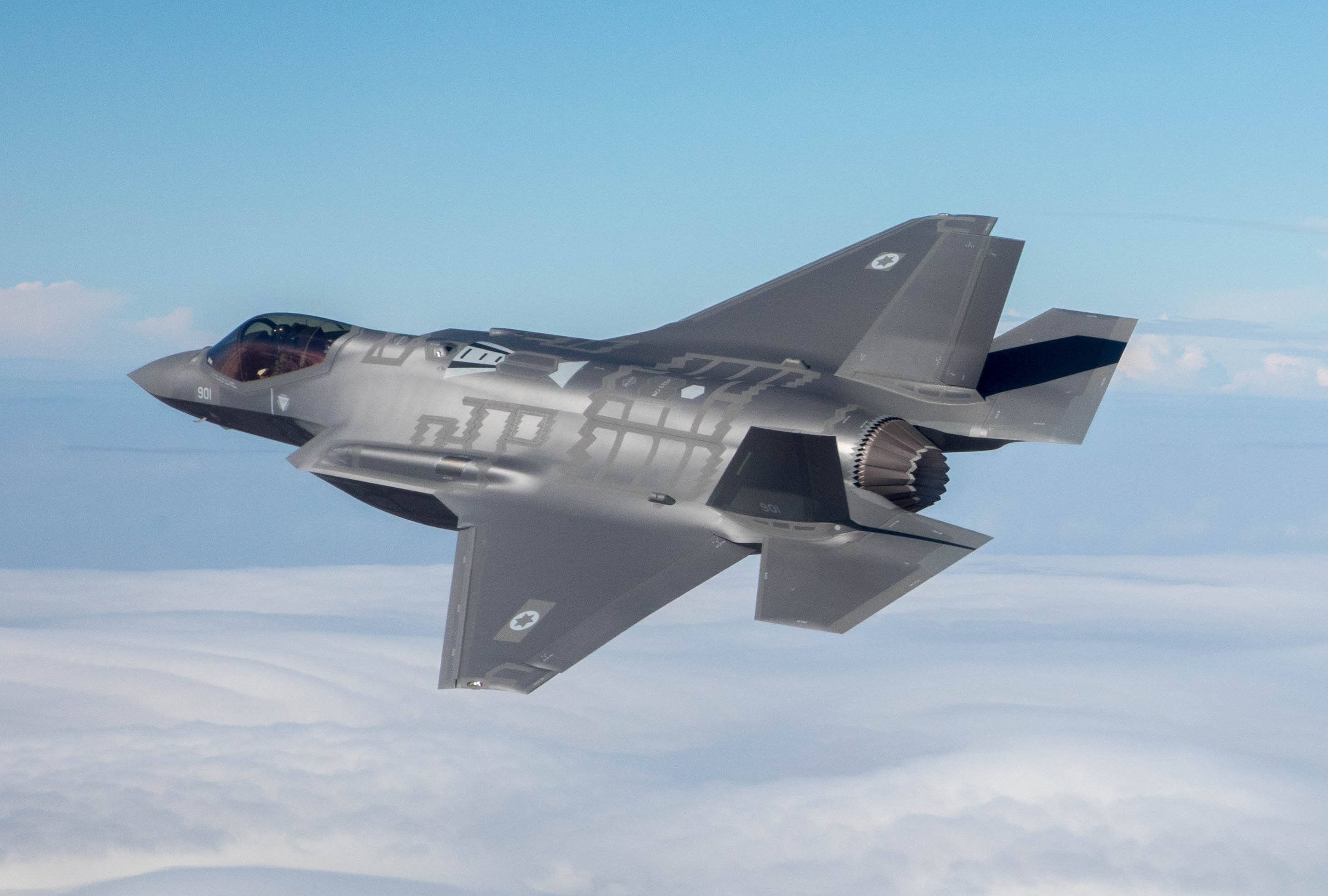
An F-35I in flight

In 2003, Israel signed a formal letter of agreement, worth almost $20 million, to join the System Development and Demonstration (SDD) effort for the F-35 as a "security cooperation participant" (SCP). The Israeli Air Force (IAF) stated in 2006 that the F-35 is a key part of IAF's recapitalization plans, and that Israel intended to buy over 100 F-35A fighters at an estimated cost of over $5 billion to replace their F-16s over time. Israel was reinstated as a partner in the development of the F-35 on 31 July 2006, after Israeli participation was put on hold following the Chinese arms deal crisis. Israel is currently in possession of 48 F-35 Adir aircraft, with 52 more on order.

=== Singapore ===
In February 2003, Singapore joined the JSF program's SDD Phase, as a SCP. It was speculated that Singapore could be buying up to 100 F-35s. In late 2013, Singapore said they were in "no particular hurry" to buy the F-35, and that they were focusing on upgrading their F-16s in the near-term. It was speculated that Singapore has specific interest in acquiring the F-35B STOVL variant due to the use of road bases adjacent to airfields, most shorter than 8,000 ft (2,400 m). It was speculated that the F-35B could also prove useful if the Endurance-class ships were converted to landing helicopter docks. In August 2016, the speculation ended with Singapore announcing it has placed on hold any decision to buy up to 12 F-35.

In January 2019, Singapore's Minister for Defense Ng Eng Hen announced that Singapore's F-16C/Ds would retire "soon after 2030", and that he was happy to report that the Defence Science and Technology Agency and Republic of Singapore Air Force completed their evaluation and decided on the F-35 to be the most likely aircraft to replace it. The Ministry of Defense announced in a statement that the Republic of Singapore Air Force would first procure an unspecified "small number" of F-35s for full evaluation of their capabilities and sustainability before deciding on a full fleet. In March, Ng announced Singapore would procure 4 F-35 aircraft for further evaluation, with an option to procure an additional 8 under the same contract. Ng added that a letter of request would be submitted to the United States in the near future, but did not clarify which variant of the F-35 was to be requested.

In January 2020, the US government approved the procurement of four F-35B jets with the option to buy eight more of the same aircraft, as well as up to 13 engines, electronic warfare systems and related support and logistics services for US$2.75 billion by Singapore.

On 28 February 2024, Minister Ng announced in parliament the procurement of 8 F-35As expected to be delivered by 2030, tallying up a total of 20 F-35s on delivery. The first delivery of F-35s is scheduled for the end of 2026.

== Exports ==
=== Belgium ===
In 2009, Belgium suggested that they might buy some F-35s in the 2020s.

An article published in Belgian newspaper L'Avenir on 19 April 2015 speculated that if the nuclear strike role as part of Belgium's Nuclear sharing policy were retained in the request for proposals, Belgium would be almost forced to buy the F-35 in order to maintain this role.

Belgium officially launched its F-16 replacement program in March 2017, issuing requests for proposals to three European and two US manufacturers: Boeing Defense, Space & Security, Lockheed Martin, Dassault Aviation, Eurofighter GmbH and Saab Group, offering the F/A-18E/F Super Hornet, F-35 Lightning II, Dassault Rafale, Eurofighter Typhoon and Saab JAS 39 Gripen respectively.

In April 2017, Boeing announced it would not compete with its F/A-18E/F Super Hornet in the competition, citing it "does not see an opportunity to compete on a truly level playing field", hinting that the program may be biased. In July 2017, Saab, too, announced it decided not to respond to the request citing Swedish foreign policy and political mandate reasons.

In October 2017, just after the deadline closed, France's Dassault Aviation responded with a much deeper offer, not only offering 34 Dassault Rafale aircraft, but also invoking broad cooperation in the fields of service, training and operations. The French Ministry of the Armed Forces stated that the offer would also strengthen European defence. The Belgian Ministry of Defence responded by stating that the offer was not submitted correctly and that only two conforming bids were received, for the Eurofighter Typhoon and Lockheed Martin F-35 Lightning II. The Ministry also stated it was seeking legal advice to further investigate the offer, but noted that none of the questions stated in the request for proposals was answered by the French offer.

In January 2018, the United States Department of State approved the potential Foreign Military Sale of 34 F-35As to Belgium for an estimated cost of US$6.53 billion.

In March 2018, leaked documents from the Belgian Ministry of Defence supposedly indicated that the Belgian Air Component leadership had long been making preparations to procure the F-35, after a promise was made to NATO about its procurement in 2013, without informing Belgium's political leaders. According to some, the procurement procedure was modified to give the F-35 an advantage and it was expected to win the competition by a wide margin. In April 2018 the leaked documents were discussed in a much publicized parliamentary hearing during which it became clear that at least some of the documents had been taken out of context. In May 2019, new documents surfaced that added to the theory that the competition was biased. These documents soon turned out to be fabricated.

In June 2018, despite earlier claims by a spokesperson of the Minister of Defence that the F-16 replacement program was going ahead as planned, the Belgian government decided to delay the decision until October and began reconsidering the option of purchasing Dassault Rafale fighters, as well as upgrading their existing fleet of aircraft.

On 25 October 2018, Belgium officially selected the offer for 34 F-35As to replace the current fleet of around 54 F-16s. In the accompanied news conference, government officials stated that the decision to select the F-35 over the Eurofighter Typhoon came down to the price, and later stated that "The offer from the Americans was the best in all seven evaluation criteria". The total purchasing price for the aircraft and its support until 2030 totaled €4 billion, €600 million cheaper than the initially budgeted €4.6 billion. First deliveries are scheduled to take place in 2023.

In March 2019, Belgium's independent parliamentary watchdog concluded that the competition had been conducted in a fair and transparent way. A December 2019 audit from the same parliamentary watchdog concluded that the F-16 was becoming increasingly hard and costly to maintain, casting serious doubt over the once proposed option to extend their service lives.

In April 2020, the first official contract for the procurement of the F-35 was signed, with deliveries scheduled to begin in 2023.

In June 2025, the Belgian government De Wever decided that Belgium will purchase additional F-35As. They talked of 21 additional aircraft. Due to budgetary challenges, the final number of additional F-35s will be reduced to 11 aircraft. That brings the total fleet to 45 F-35As.

=== Finland ===
The Finnish Air Force has expressed its interest in the F-35, and other "advanced aircraft", as the replacement for its F-18C Hornets. Major General Lauri Puranen said in June 2015, "These five fighters are Eurofighter, French Dassault Rafale, American Boeing Super Hornet or Lockheed Martin JSF F-35, and Swedish JAS 39 Gripen. All of these are possible and we don't have a favorite." The selection process began in 2018 with a decision by 2020 or 2021.

On 27 April 2018, the Finnish Defence Forces issued a Request for Quotation for the HX Fighter Program. The request asked quotations on the Boeing F/A-18 Super Hornet, Dassault Rafale, Eurofighter Typhoon, Lockheed Martin F-35 and Saab Gripen. The final quotations are to be requested in 2020 and a decision would be made in 2021. Their existing fleet of Hornets would begin to be phased out in 2025. The program also includes an obligation for at least 30 percent domestic industrial participation.

On 6 December 2021 multiple reports emerged that the Finnish Defense Forces have selected the F-35A as the winner of its HX Fighter program, to replace its legacy fleet of F/A-18 Hornets. The same sources have reported that the odds of the Finnish Government rejecting the decision are "quite slim". In 2020 the U.S. State Department granted Finland full approval to order the F-35 if it were to be selected.

On 10 December 2021 F-35A was selected as the winner of the HX programme. The order is for 64 F-35's, valued at around 8.4 billion EUR, with deliveries beginning in 2026.

=== Germany ===
German officials first met with Lockheed Martin officials in June 2017, during the Paris Air Show after having issued a request for a confidential meeting to discuss the F-35 as a potential Panavia Tornado replacement a month before.

After it became clear that the F-35 was a serious candidate by September 2017, the German Federal Ministry of Defence sent a letter to Boeing, requesting a similar classified meeting on the McDonnell Douglas F-15 Eagle and Boeing F/A-18E/F Super Hornet, as well as Airbus for additional information on the Eurofighter Typhoon, an aircraft the German Air Force already operates.

In November 2017, the German Air Force had come up with a shortlist for the types of aircraft most fit to replace its Panavia Tornado fleet. The F-35 was considered the preferred choice as it fulfilled most of the requirements and offered a number of additional benefits beside.

Soon after, however, mixed signals started arriving from the German Air Force, Federal Ministry of Defence and the Parliament, with some officials distancing themselves from the choices made in shortlisting the F-35, and touting the Eurofighter Typhoon as the preferred alternative.

In March 2018, Lieutenant general of the German Air Force Karl Müllner was dismissed from service after stating his preference for the F-35. Although the official reason was a reorganization in the German Air Force's structure, it is widely speculated that the dismissal is part of an effort to steer the German Air Force away from the F-35.

It was speculated that Germany's choice was limited to the F-35 because of its need to fulfill a credible nuclear strike capability as per the NATO nuclear sharing agreement. The Eurofighter Typhoon is not currently able to fulfill this role, and its ability to penetrate potentially hostile Russian airspace in the event of a nuclear escalation is considered weaker than that of the F-35. However, in January 2019 the F-35 was eliminated from the competition, leaving only the Typhoon and the Super Hornet as candidates.

In March 2020, German newspaper Handelsblatt reported that the German Federal Ministry of Defence was preparing to procure a mixture of 90 new Typhoons and 45 Super Hornets. The Super Hornets are to be tasked with performing nuclear strike roles under the NATO nuclear sharing agreement. As of March 2020, the Super Hornet is not currently certified to carry and launch the B61 nuclear weapons located in Germany, but Dan Gillian, head of Boeing's Super Hornet program, previously stated that "We certainly think that we, working with the U.S. government, can meet the German requirements there on the [Germans'] timeline."

On 3 February 2022, reports started spreading around from a source close to the German military that a possible F-35 purchase was "back on the table", but no decisions were expected anytime soon.

On 14 March 2022, Germany's defense ministry officially announced its intention to purchase up to 35 F-35 to replace its ageing Tornado IDS in the controversial nuclear strike role. The US State Department made a determination approving a possible Foreign Military Sale to the Government of Germany of F-35 Aircraft, Munitions, and related equipment for an estimated cost of $8.4 billion on 28 July 2022.

On 14 December 2022 funding was approved for a batch of procurements in Germany that included the F-35 deal. The first jets are expected to be delivered to Germany in 2026 with initial operating capability being expected in 2028. On 18 September 2026, Germany received its first F-35 at United States Air Force Plant 4.

=== Japan ===
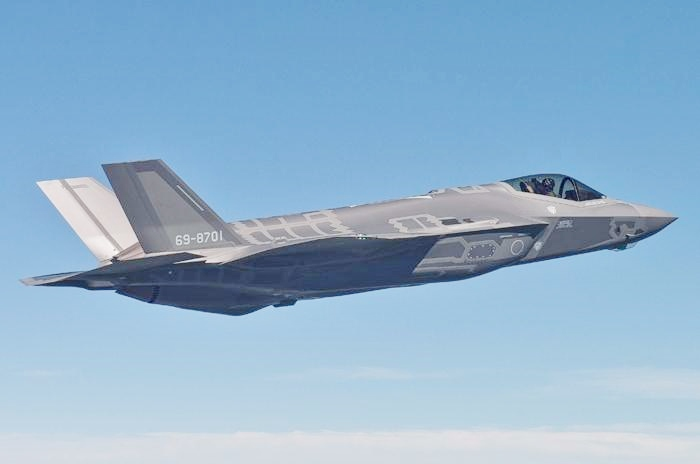
An F-35A from the Japanese Air Self-Defense Force

Japan's arms export ban has kept it out of the development phase of the F-35 project, which has contributed to the decline of its arms industries so Japan is considering an off the shelf purchase of the F-35 with no national industrial participation. Lockheed Martin has offered final assembly of the Japanese F-35s to Japanese industry, along with "maintenance, repair and upgrade capability". In October 2011 Lockheed upped the amount of workshare to be offered to the Japanese to include manufacture of major components and engine assembly. This is because the United States government has now allowed Lockheed to reveal confidential technologies to Japanese firms.

On 20 December 2011 the Japanese Government announced that it intended to purchase 42 F-35s for approximately US$8 billion, with initial delivery to begin in 2016 to replace its existing F-4 Phantom II aircraft. In order to fully participate in the program, the Japanese government is loosening their weapons export ban. May 2012, a notification to Congress, the US Defense Security Cooperation Agency outlined the details of the proposed Foreign Military Sales (FMS) deal, sale of 42 Lockheed Martin F-35A fighter aircraft to Japan at $10 billion.

In 2012 it was reported that the F-35s purchased after FY13 would include Japanese parts. In 2013, the Japanese government decided that since Japanese companies would merely function as subcontractors that these parts would be exempt from the usual weapons export ban. In August 2013, it was confirmed that Japanese companies will manufacture 24 components of the F-35 related to the engine and radar. Mitsubishi Electric will manufacture 7 components of the radar, and IHI Corporation will manufacture 17 fan and turbine components of the engine. Mitsubishi Heavy Industries will also be included in some form in the manufacturing of the rear fuselage, wings, and undercarriage, which will allow Japanese industry to gain a greater understanding of low-observability stealth technology and manufacture. While four F-35As ordered in 2012 will be finished products, the two to be ordered in 2013 will have Japanese manufactured components. Technological insights gained from the manufacture of components related to stealth will most certainly be applied to the development of the indigenous Mitsubishi ATD-X.

In 2014, Mitsubishi Heavy Industries pressed for a Japanese government subsidy to manufacture F-35 parts for export.

The first four aircraft will be assembled in Texas, with the remainder built in Nagoya.

In July 2014, Japanese Minister of Defence Itsunori Onodera unveiled plans to replace nearly 100 F-15Js not slated for upgrade with F-35s.

In September 2014 the Japanese government announced that it will develop its own stealth fighter, a design that will outperform the F-35. Harukazu Saito, chief of staff at the Air Self-Defense Force, stated, "We can respond more quickly to an unpredictable situation that might happen to our fighters if they are made domestically than in the case of foreign-made fighters, and we can operate domestically made fighters more smoothly."

In December 2017, Japanese newspaper Yomiuri Shimbun reported that the Japanese government was considering modifying its Izumo-class helicopter destroyers to operate with roughly 10 F-35B aircraft. Multiple plans are reportedly under consideration, some of which call for US Marine Corps F-35s to use the vessels, but others for Japan to procure its own aircraft. The plan quickly raised criticism from China, where government officials reacted negatively and urged Japan to "act cautiously".

In February 2018, the Yomiuri Shimbun reported that the Japanese government was also considering a purchase of F-35Bs for the defence of remote islands. Cited sources claim the Japanese government may already be considering a purchase in the 2019 defence budget, which could see the first deliveries in 2024, and operational capability from 2026.

In November 2018, Nikkei Asian Review reported that Japan was planning to order an additional 100 F-35 aircraft, including both the F-35A and F-35B variant, the latter not previously procured. The planned procurement of the F-35B is rumored to be associated with the currently researched possibility of deploying fixed-wing aircraft on the helicopter destroyers. The plans were reportedly in response of Chinese military build-up in the region. In December 2018, the Japanese government approved the plan to procure an additional 105 F-35 aircraft, reportedly 63 of these are to be F-35A aircraft, and 42 F-35B aircraft. The plan increases Japan's total F-35 aircraft ordered to 147. Initially, to save money, these additional aircraft were planned to not be assembled in Japan. This decision was reversed in 2021, due to declining F-35 local production cost.

The United States has refused to share the F-35 software source code with its partners, despite their repeated requests for it. However, in April 2019, the United States proposed disclosing portions of that source code with Japan, if Lockheed Martin is successful in its bid to develop the new Japanese F-3 stealth fighter; those portions of the F-35 software would be reused for the F-3.

On June 18, 2019, Japan's Ministry of Defense requested the Pentagon upgrade Japan's status as a customer to a full-fledge partner in the F-35 program. This request came near the time of Turkey's expulsion from the F-35 program. The letter, written by Atsuo Suzuki, director general for the Bureau of Defense Buildup Planning, and sent to Pentagon acquisition head Ellen Lord, stated, "I believe becoming a partner country in F-35 program is an option. I would like to have your thoughts on whether or not Japan has a possibility to be a partner country in the first place. Also, I would like you to provide the Ministry of Defense with detailed information about the responsibilities and rights of a partner country, as well as cost sharing and conditions such as the approval process and the required period. We would like to make a final decision whether we could proceed to become a partner country by thoroughly examining the rights and obligations associated with becoming a partner country based on the terms and conditions you would provide." The request was welcomed by some officials of the program due to Turkey's expulsion as a partner and Japan's commitment to being the second largest buyer of F-35s. However, it is likely that the request would be denied due to political reasons, as this would allow other "customer nations" to petition for partner-level status; creating further complications in the F-35 program.

In June 2020, Japan Marine United started work on refitting the first of two JMSDF Izumo-class helicopter destroyers for operations with the F-35B, confirming rumors of planned naval operation.

On 9 July 2020, the US Defense Security Cooperation Agency (DSCA) announced that the US Department of State has approved a potential US$23.11 billion sale of 105 F-35 aircraft to Japan - 63 F-35As and 42 F-35Bs, along with related equipment and services. This is in addition to the 42 F-35A already ordered. This would be the second-largest foreign military sale ever by the US. The deal still needs approval by the US Congress.

"This proposed sale will support the foreign policy goals and national security objectives of the United States by improving the security of a major ally that is a force for political stability and economic progress in the Asia-Pacific region", the DSCA said. "It is vital to U.S. national interest to assist Japan in developing and maintaining a strong and effective self-defense capability". It added that "the proposed sale of aircraft and support will augment Japan's operational aircraft inventory and enhance its air-to-air and air-to-ground self-defense capability. The Japan Air Self-Defense Force's F-4 aircraft are being decommissioned as F-35s are added to the inventory. Japan will have no difficulty absorbing these aircraft into its armed forces." The DSCA also stated that the proposed deal "will not alter the basic military balance in the region".

==== Detailed F-35 orders of the JASDF ====
Fiscal year	Budget (¥ billion)	F-35 yearly procurement		Notes
Fiscal year	Budget (¥ billion)	F-35A	F-35B	Notes
Target total	–	105	42	147 planned
2027	¥ 0	–	–	
2027	¥ 0	–	–	
2026	¥ 149.30	8	–	
2026	¥ 72.50	–	3	
2025	¥ 138.70	8	–	
2025	¥ 66.50	–	3	
2024	¥ 112.00	8	–	
2024	¥ 128.20	–	7	
2023	¥ 106.90	8	–	
2023	¥ 143.50	–	8	
2022	¥ 76.80	8	–	
2022	¥ 51.00	–	4	
2021	¥ 39.10	4	–	
2021	¥ 25.90	–	2	
2020	¥ 28.10	3	–	
2020	¥ 79.30	–	6	
2019	¥ 68.10	6	–	
2018	¥ 78.50	6	–	
2017	¥ 88.00	6	–	
2016	¥ 108.40	6	–	
2015	¥ 103.20	6	–	
2014	¥ 63.80	4	–	
2013	¥ 29.90	2	–	
2012	¥ 39.50	4	–	
Total	¥ 1,797.29 (+ ¥ 0.00)	87 (+ 0)	33 (+ 0)	–
Total	¥ 1,797.29 (+ ¥ 0.00)	120 (+ 0)		–

Targeted number of vehicles
Budget request

=== Poland ===
On 6 February 2014, the Polish Ministry of National Defence set out a budget in which its interests include buying 64 fifth-generation multi-role fighters that will not include the previous F-16 Fighting Falcon deals. Possible options are reportedly 64 F-35 fighters from 2021 to replace the MiG-29s operated by the Polish Air Force.

In June 2017, the Polish Deputy Defence Minister announced plans to acquire fifth-generation combat aircraft by around 2025 under a new project named "Harpia", which aims to replace Poland's ageing fleet of Sukhoi Su-22 and Mikoyan MiG-29 aircraft. Officials have stated this may mean a purchase of two squadrons of F-35 aircraft, totaling 32 aircraft, but that Poland is also looking into used US Air Force F-16s.

In February 2019, Poland's Minister of Defence Mariusz Błaszczak announced the signing of a military modernization plan, which includes the procurement of 32 fifth-generation aircraft as a priority procurement. The minister added he expected senior military staff to initiate action on this task immediately.

In April 2019, U.S. Vice Admiral and head of the Pentagon's F-35 office Mathias Winter submitted a written testimony to the U.S. House of Representatives in which Poland was identified as a "future potential Foreign Military Sales customer". Later that day Poland's Minister of Defence Błaszczak stated that "Since the US side talks about it publicly, it means the purchase can be accelerated", adding "I am happy with this information. It is not a surprise, because we have already started negotiations. I have prepared the legal and financial basis to acquire at least 32 fifth-generation combat aircraft". On 25 April during a visit to Warsaw, U.S. Secretary of the Air Force Heather Wilson said that a U.S. Air Force team was to visit Poland in May in order to demonstrate the F-35s capabilities. A few days later, Polish Minister of Defence Błaszczak stated on a televised interview that the signing of a contract to purchase F-35 jets was "not far away". Błaszczak implied the signing of the contract could coincide with the signing of a contract to permanently base U.S. troops in Poland, which is scheduled to be agreed before the end of the year.

On 28 May 2019, the Polish Minister of Defence announced that Poland had sent a request for quotation for the acquisition of 32 F-35A aircraft.

On 11 September 2019, the Department of Defense Security Cooperation Agency announced that Poland had been cleared to purchase 32 F-35A fighters, along with associated equipment, for an estimated cost of $6.5 billion. On 27 September 2019 the US Congress approved the sale.

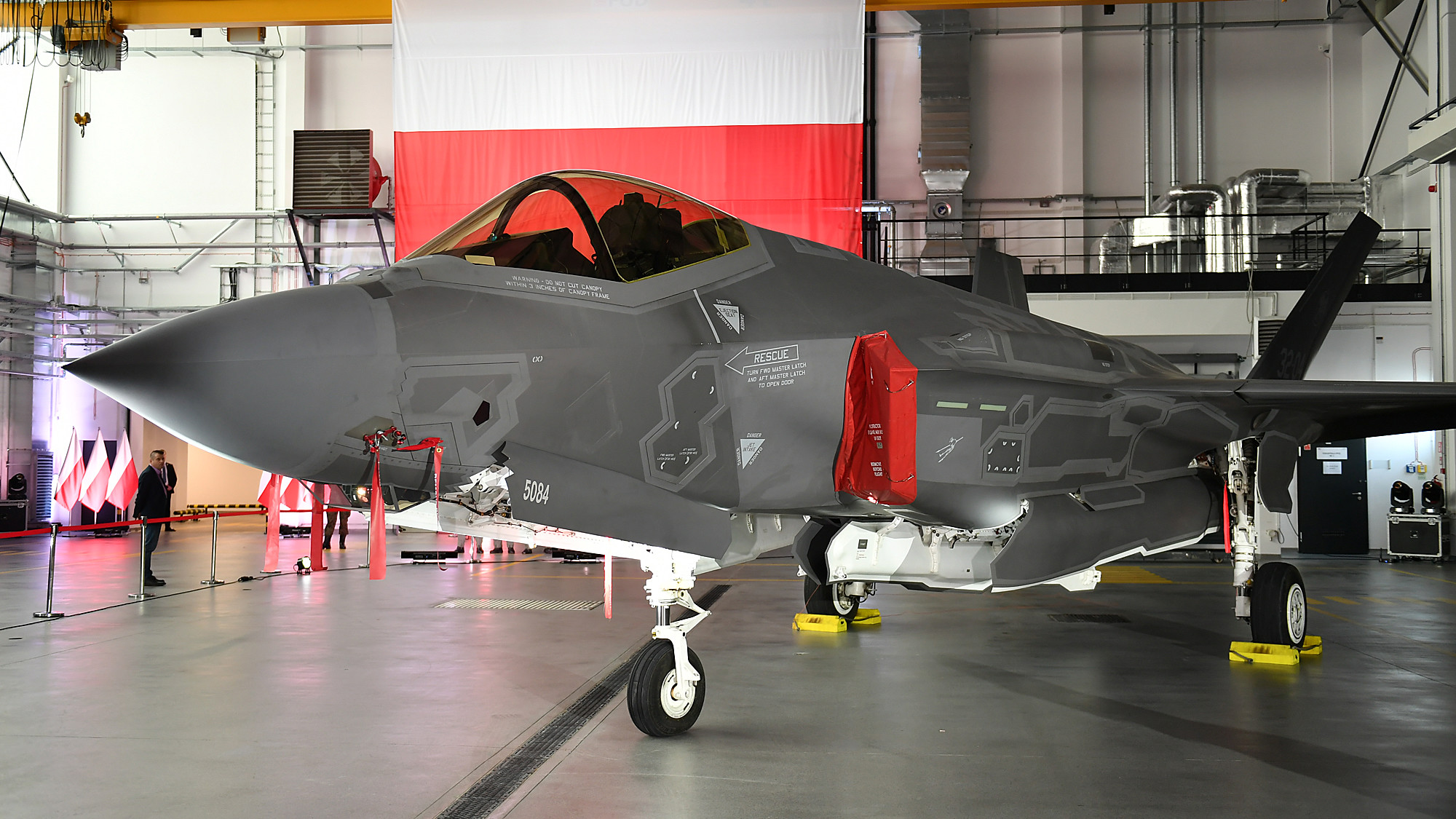
F-35 in 41st Training Air Base in Dęblin, Poland during the 2020 acquisition deal signing ceremony

On 31 January 2020, during a ceremony attended by the Polish President, Prime Minister, Minister of Defense, and the US ambassador to Poland, Poland's acquisition efforts concluded with signing of a $4.6 billion deal for procurement of 32 F-35A Block 4 jets with Technology Refresh 3 software update and drogue parachutes, for an average unit price of $87.3 million net.

In addition to the 32 jets, the deal encompasses also:

- modernization package and subsequent upgrades in the future,
- the necessary equipment, incl. the ground support equipment, and any equipment needed to secure the planes' future operation,
- ground training system to be installed in air bases, incl. an Integrated Training Center and eight Full Mission Simulators,
- personnel training in the US of 90 technicians and 24 pilots, incl. up to an instructor level,
- full logistical support until 2030 as part of the Global Support Solution (GSS) system, and
- an IT system for operations management.

The initial deliveries of the F-35s are expected to begin in 2024 with in-country deliveries to start in 2026. Yearly, 4 to 6 units are expected to be delivered, concluding deliveries in 2030. Reaching the IOC will be possible after delivery of at least 8 units together with the associated additional equipment and finalization of training of the associated personnel. The first 6 planes will be stationed in Ebbing Air National Guard Base, for training of the Polish Armed Forces personnel. After delivery, the jets are expected to be based in Łask Air Base, Poland. The first Polish F-35 "Husarz" was unveiled during an official ceremony at Fort Worth attended by Polish and American military and government officials on 28 August 2024.

=== South Korea ===
South Korea started considering the F-35 in 2009, among several other competitors, for its F-X Phase III fighter program. South Korean officials had indicated that the F-35 would only be available for delivery after 2018, but Steve O'Bryan, Lockheed's vice president for F-35 business development, said at that time that Lockheed could deliver the F-35 to South Korea by 2016. Some Republic of Korea Air Force (ROKAF) officers have outlined possible missions for the stealth fighter, such as surprise raids deep into nuclear armed North Korea. Lockheed has refused to allow ROKAF pilots access to the aircraft to test it prior to the selection, however simulations available to South Korea are more extensive than the processes used by other customers, such as Israel and Japan. In August 2013, the F-35 was essentially eliminated from the competition when the American foreign military sales process prevented Lockheed Martin from offering a price that did not exceed South Korea's budget for the program, leaving just the Boeing F-15SE Silent Eagle within the nation's budget. Lockheed Martin responded that it would work with the American government to continue to offer the F-35 to South Korea. The defense ministry rejected the award and said a new competition would be held to "secure military capability in line with recent aviation technology developments". In November 2013, the Korean Joint Chiefs of Staff Council recommended purchasing 40 F-35A as North Korea seemed to have difficulty dealing with radar-evading aircraft. On 27 January 2014, the Defense Acquisition Program Administration said that a contract for the 40 aircraft would be reviewed and, once approved, signed in September. With deliveries planned to begin in 2018, South Korea would benefit from the scale of F-35 production at the time. With full-scale production having begun, the Unit Recurring Flyaway (URF) cost of one F-35A is expected to be $80–$85 million, which includes the aircraft, avionics and mission systems, the engine, logistics support, and a flight simulator. Through the Foreign Military Sales (FMS) agreement and past budget issues, the cost projection may be likely to rise. South Korea's formal selection of the F-35 purchase was finalized on 24 September 2014. South Korea is the third FMS country to procure the F-35A after Israel and Japan.

In December 2017, Korean media reported that the Defense Acquisition Program Administration had established a process for acquiring an additional 20 F-35 aircraft, in addition to the 40 it had already ordered in 2014.

The first F-35A was delivered in Fort Worth, Texas on 28 March 2018. The aircraft will remain in the US as South Korean crews will begin training with the aircraft at Luke Air Force Base. The arrival of the first F-35s in South Korea occurred in March 2019, when two F-35As were delivered to a base in Cheongju.

In December 2019, 13 F-35A of 17th Fighter Wing has declared as operational within the Republic of Korea Air Force (ROKAF).

=== Switzerland ===
The Swiss Air Force sought a replacement for its current fleet of Northrop F-5 and McDonnell Douglas F/A-18 Hornet aircraft. These aircraft had been scheduled to be replaced by the Saab Gripen, but this was blocked by Swiss voters in a 2014 referendum. In response, the Swiss government launched the Air 2030 program, seeking again to find a replacement aircraft.

In March 2018, Swiss officials named the contenders in its Air 2030 program: The Saab Gripen E (disqualified in June 2019 as it was considered not ready to perform all tests), Dassault Rafale, Eurofighter Typhoon, Boeing F/A-18E/F Super Hornet and the Lockheed Martin F-35. The program has a budget of US$8 billion to cover both combat aircraft and ground-based air defense systems.

In October 2018, it was reported by Janes that the Swiss Air Force may limit the purchase to a single-engine fighter for budgetary reasons.

A team of four F-35s performed demonstrations for Swiss personnel at Payerne Air Base in June 2019. The aircraft was evaluated in a series of eight flights and compared with flights performed by other bidders.

The Swiss population was asked whether or not to proceed with Air 2030 program in a referendum on 27 September 2020. The program was approved with a very slim margin of less than 9,000 votes.

On 30 June 2021 the Swiss Federal Council proposed the acquisition of 36 F-35As to Parliament at a cost of up to 6 billion Swiss francs (US$6.5 billion), citing the aircraft's cost- and combat-effectiveness. However, it was later confirmed that the costs were capped for a period of just 10 years. It has also been reported that the operating costs would have been reduced by replacing some actual flying with bundled simulators. As in other countries, there have also been complaints that the F-35 is 3 dB louder than the F/A-18C/D, and the Liberal Greens promised to examine its environmental impact. The Swiss anti-military group GSoA also intended to contest the purchase in another national referendum supported by the Green Party of Switzerland and the Social Democratic Party of Switzerland (which previously managed to block the Gripen). In August 2022, they registered the initiative, with 120,000 people having signed in less than a year (with 100,000 required). The budget was narrowly approved by single majority, but rejecting the selection would have required a double majority.

On November 26, 2021, it was announced that Armasuisse had agreed to contract terms with the US government for 36 F-35As for CHF 6.035 billion. The next step was to request Parliament approve funds in the 2022 Armed Forces Dispatch. The order was then subject to parliamentary approval and the popular initiative not proceeding or failing. A parliamentary inquiry found the purchase worrisome but legal. The government did not wait for the popular initiative to proceed, which was legally permitted.

On 15 September 2022 the Swiss National council gave the Federal council permission to sign the purchase deal, with a time limit for signing of March 2023. The deal to buy 36 F-35A was signed on 19 September 2022, with deliveries to commence in 2027 and conclude by 2030.

On 20 September 2022 the popular initiative was withdrawn, due to the contract signing.

On 13 August 2025, after talks with US officials, the Federal Council said Switzerland could not assert a fixed price for the F-35A procurement. This directly contradicted Federal Councillor Viola Amherd, who had repeatedly asserted publicly the procurement prices as guaranteed or fixed and part of the contracts. It said the final procurement cost could not yet be calculated precisely and that possible additional costs, first announced at the end of June, ranged from CHF 650 million to CHF 1.3 billion. In March 2026, the Federal Council requested a supplementary credit of CHF 394 million for the F-35A procurement; Armasuisse said this would allow Switzerland to procure approximately 30 F-35A aircraft, with the final number dependent on later US contracts for aircraft and engines.

=== Czech Republic ===
The Czech Air Force has been offered 24 F-35As to replace their leased 14 JAS 39 Gripens, as their lease expires in 2027 or 2029. On 3 November 2021, Janes reported the Czech Republic's requirement for 40 aircraft, with the F-35 being offered as an option.

On 20 July 2022 the Czech government announced that they intend to begin the process of procuring 24 F-35s.

On 30 June 2023, US State Department approved sale of 24 F-35 fighters for the Czech Republic. The plan for the purchase of the aircraft, staff training, ammunition, fuel as well as upgrades to the Čáslav Air Base was approved on 27 September 2023. The total cost is CZK 150 billion or $6.47 billion. According to Czech Prime Minister Petr Fiala, the first fighters would be ready in 2029 and the others by 2035.

On 29 January 2024, the Czech government signed a memorandum of understanding with the United States for the purchase of 24 F-35A fighters. The deal is valued at $5.6 billion with the first deliveries beginning in 2031 and full operational capability in 2035.

=== Greece ===
Lockheed Martin offered the F-35 to Greece's Hellenic Air Force as a replacement for F-4E Peace Icarus 2000 and F-16C/D Block 30 aircraft in 2009.

As of October 2017, largely due to the Greek government-debt crisis, Greece has decided to upgrade the Hellenic Air Force's fleet of ageing General Dynamics F-16 Fighting Falcon aircraft, and to postpone a decision on further procurement until the 2020s. The F-35 was reportedly still on the table, and if economically viable by the 2020 timeframe, plans call for a purchase of 15 to 20 aircraft.

In April 2019, U.S. Vice Admiral and head of the Pentagon's F-35 office Mathias Winter submitted a written testimony to the U.S. House of Representatives in which Greece was identified as a "future potential Foreign Military Sales customer". Later the same day, Greek defense minister Evangelos Apostolakis stated that Greece would consider the possibility of acquiring the F-35 as part of its efforts to upgrade the Hellenic Air Force fleet.

In January 2020, Greek prime minister Kyriakos Mitsotakis visited Donald Trump in the White House and discussed Greece's interest in the F-35. In the following days, Greece's Minister for National Defence Nikos Panagiotopoulos announced that, alongside upgrading Greece's fleet of F-16s, Greece is looking to procure 24 F-35 aircraft at an estimated cost of US$3 billion.

On October 10, 2021, the Greek Minister of Defense, Nikos Panagiotopoulos, stated that "The requirement of the Greek Armed Forces to adequately cover the Defense needs of the country is for 48 new-gen aircraft, as well as for 12 to 13 frigates with maybe some corvettes". Sources claim that the requirement for 48 aircraft may not include the recently acquired 24 Rafales. Then on November 20, 2021, he directly addressed the potential acquisition of the F-35, saying "(...)when we are preparing and discussing possibly the procurement of a Fifth Generation F-35 aircraft - at some point we will enter this discussion - (...)" which confirmed a report from Janes on November 3, 2021, that Greece continues to be "in active campaign" for the F-35.

On 30 June 2022, Greece's prime minister confirmed that the country has sent a request to the U.S. for the purchase of 20 F-35s, with the option of buying a second group of jets also being examined. The expected delivery date is 2027–2028. On 27 January 2024, the US State Department formally approved Greece's request for sale of up to 40 conventional variants for $8.6 billion. The procurement program was finalized on 25 July 2024 with the signing of Letter of Offer and Acceptance for 20 F-35s. The LOA also includes the option to buy an additional 20 F-35s in the future.

=== Romania ===
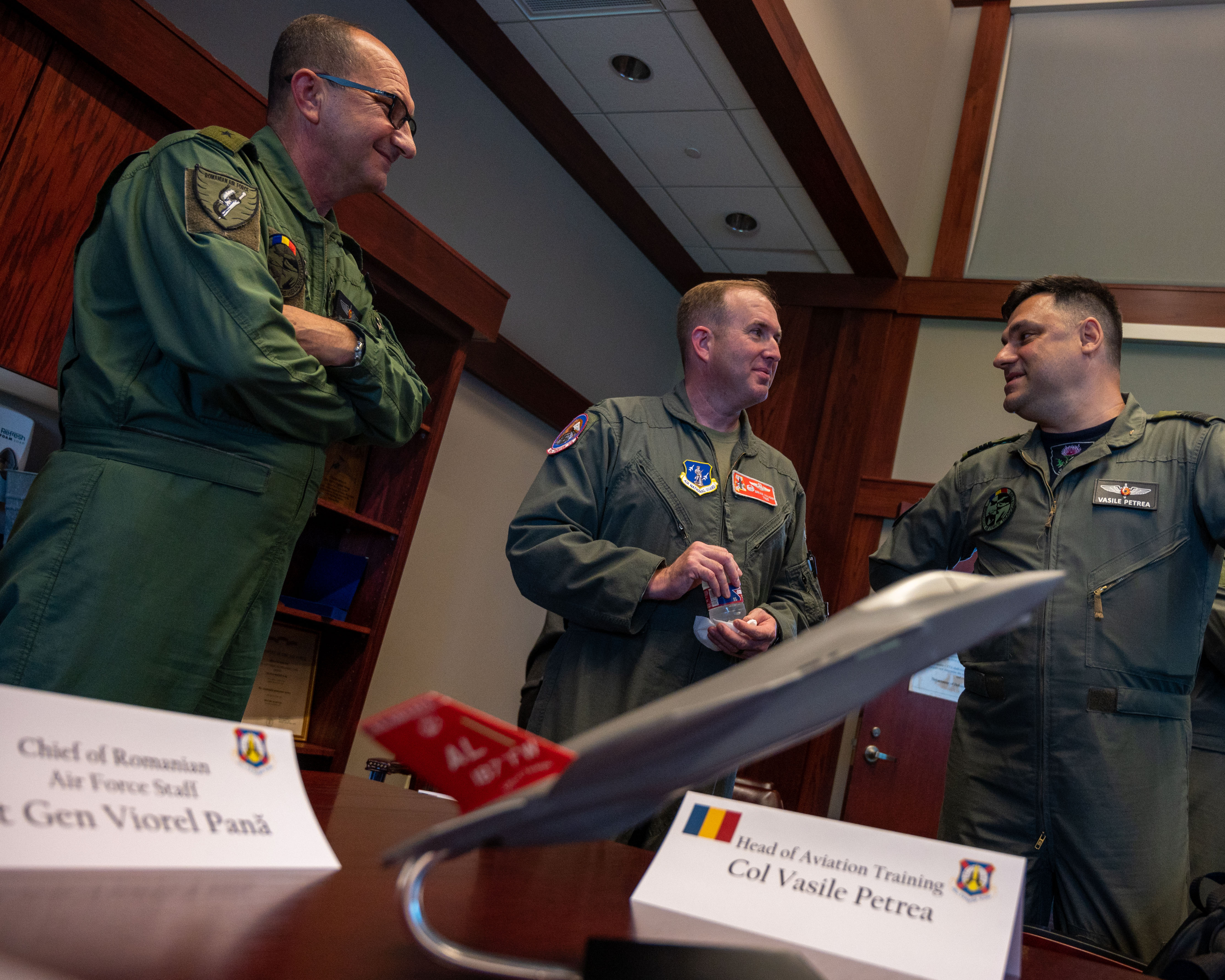
The Romanian delegation taking part in an F-35 conversion tour at Dannelly Field

In 2012, the Romanian Ministry of Defence expressed interest in buying the F-35 for its air force sometime after 2020. This proposal was based on an earlier plan from 2010 which called for the acquisition of 24 F-35 fighters that would enter service when the first lot of F-16s was retired.

In October 2017, Romania's Minister of National Defence stated that Romania was targeting one squadron of F-35 aircraft as part of a 10-year program spanning 2017 to 2026.

In April 2019, U.S. Vice Admiral and head of the Pentagon's F-35 office Mathias Winter submitted a written testimony to the U.S. House of Representatives in which Romania was identified as a "future potential Foreign Military Sales customer". Later that month, Romania's Minister of National Defence Gabriel-Beniamin Leș commented on the news during an announcement to procure additional ex-Portuguese F-16s that it would be "a bit too much" for Romania.

On 2 February 2022, the President of Romania stated the intent to purchase the F-35 as part of the Air Force modernization program, which plans to spend a total of 9.8 billion euros until 2026 to boost its defense capabilities. Soon after, then Minister of Defence Vasile Dîncu responded that the acquisition procedure for the F-35 will start from 2032. During the Black Sea Defense & Aerospace 2022 exposition, Lockheed Martin brought an F-35 simulator, and a scale model of the F-35 in Romanian markings was displayed.

In March 2023, the chief of the General Directorate for Armaments, Major-General Teodor Incicaș, stated in an interview that the first steps of the procedure are to start in 2023 or 2024, with the first F-35 squadron to be operational after 2030. On 11 April 2023, the F-35 acquisition procedure was approved following a meeting of the Romanian Supreme Council of National Defense. In June 2023, a Romanian delegation together with the Chief of the Romanian Air Force Staff, Lieutenant general Viorel Pană, took part in a tour hosted by the 187th Fighter Wing. The tour provided Romania with insight on the F-35 conversion process, as the 187th Fighter Wing was set to receive the fifth-generation fighter aircraft in December 2023. After a request for the purchase was sent to the Parliament on 9 August, the F-35 program was approved on 24 October. According to a statement given by Angel Tîlvăr, the Minister of Defence, if the acceptance letter will be signed in 2024, the first F-35s are to arrive in 2032. A total of 48 aircraft are desired for equipping three squadrons. According to General Incicaș, the acceptance letter was sent to the United States in November 2023. On 26 September, it was announced that the first phase of the contract, worth $6.5 billion, will consist of 32 aircraft as well as logistical support and training services, engines, flight simulators, ammunition. Another 16 aircraft will be procured in a second phase. Industrial cooperation and technology transfers to Romanian companies are also included in the agreement.

The draft law for acquiring the F-35 was published by the Romanian Army in August 2024. According to this draft, the F-16s will start to be retired in 2034 and by 2040, Romania will only operate the F-35. The contract for the F-35 purchase is expected to be signed sometime between October 2024 and January 2025. The possible Foreign Military Sale of F-35s to Romania for an estimated $7.2 billion, although the final price will be around $6.4 billion, was approved by the US State Department on 13 September 2024. After it was approved by the Government, then passed through the Chamber of Deputies and the Senate, the law for purchasing the F-35s was promulgated by President Iohannis on 15 November. The Letter of Offer and Acceptance contract for the first stage of the program was signed by the Romanian Minister of Defence Angel Tîlvăr and the US Ambassador to Romania Kathleen Kavalec on 21 November 2024.

== Potential exports ==
=== India ===
In 2010, the Indian Navy received a briefing from Lockheed Martin on the F-35 via an RFI.

In January 2018, sources in the Indian Ministry of Defence were reportedly considering the possibility of an order for the F-35, and a request for information should follow at an unknown later date.

In February 2018, it was reported that the Indian Air Force was interested in the procurement of 126 F-35As, and that a classified briefing by Lockheed Martin had been requested. Any deal would have to include partial local manufacturing facilities as per Indian legislation as part of the Make in India initiative.

In March 2018, Indian Air Force Chief of the Air Staff Birender Singh Dhanoa clarified that no request was made for the F-35, nor for a classified briefing. Soon after, however, US Navy Admiral and United States Pacific Command commander Harry B. Harris Jr. came out in support of a potential F-35 sale to India, stating that the US Pacific Command supports a series of potential sales, including the F-35.

In February 2025, President Donald Trump stated in a joint news conference with Prime Minister Narendra Modi that he would offer to sell the F-35 to India. However, Trump clarified that the offer was only in the proposal stage and would be part of a larger tranche of military sales to India. Furthermore, during his first official visit to India in April 2025, Vice President JD Vance expressed his admiration for the Indian Air Force and reaffirmed his government's strong support for India's acquisition of the F-35, emphasizing the jet’s unmatched capabilities to enhance India’s national defense.

However, in late July 2025, Bloomberg reported that India has already rejected its requirement of the aircraft. While the Indian Ministry of Defence has not confirmed any of this, the Indian Ministry of External Affairs maintained that India has not held any formal discussions about the aircraft's procurement with the USA.

=== Portugal ===
In the late 2010s, the Portuguese Ministry of National Defense and the Portuguese Air Force began openly considering replacing their F-16s with a fifth-generation fighter by 2030, when their F-16s reach their service retirement age. Portugal, having only received their F-16s in 1994 with a mid-life upgrade by the Air Force and OGMA in 2001, was not in any particular rush to procure a replacement compared to other European countries operating older-generation or non-stealth aircraft. The Portuguese Military Programming law, signed in 2019, points to roughly 2027 as the year funds are allocated to the Air Force for procurement. President Marcelo Rebelo de Sousa was also aware of the need to plan the F-16's replacement. In 2020, the Portuguese Air Force developed a technological solution capable of integrating the data transmission of JTACs with the F-35 platform.

On November 27, 2023, the Portuguese Air Force unveiled its "Air Force 5.3." program, which includes the acquisition of 5th generation fighters, UAVs, and light attack aircraft. In November 2023, the Chief of Staff of the Air Force announced that the F-35 was chosen to replace the F-16. An analysis article published in February 2024 by Janes mentioned Portugal as one of the possible future operators of 28 Lockheed Martin F-35 fighters. In May 2024, the Portuguese Chief of Staff of the Air Force further clarified that the intention was to purchase 27 F-35s for an estimated cost of 5.5 billion euros.

In an April 2024 interview with the news Diário de Notícias, General Cartaxo Alves of the Portuguese Air Force announced the Air Force had already started the transition to the F-35, and a workshop on this transition for the fifth-generation fighter was held in conjunction with Lockheed Martin and United States Air Force. Lockheed Martin was present at Monte Real Air Base (where Portugal's F-16s are based) with an F-35 cockpit simulator in September 2024, during the celebration of 30 years of F-16 service in Portugal.

On March 13, 2025, following disputes between the U.S. and the EU and regarding NATO spending goals and a looming trade war, Portuguese Minister of National Defence Nuno Melo announced Portugal was no longer actively seeking to procure the F-35 to replace their F-16s in the foreseeable future and that the Portuguese Air Force would likely purchase a European fighter jet instead. Melo cited the "predictability" of European countries compared to the U.S. under President Donald Trump as the primary reason, but clarified that this decision did not change Portugal's stance on the U.S. as a close ally.

On March 31, Major General João Nogueira, director of the weapons systems maintenance directorate, confirmed that the F-35 continues to be considered as a possible replacement jet for the F-16. After several news reports that pointed to Portugal's withdrawal from the purchase of the F-35, the Chief of Staff of the Air Force, on April 22, 2025, admitted that the F-35 is the only fighter that allows a technological advance in relation to the F-16, with Portugal having no alternative but to acquire the F-35.

=== Qatar ===
In October 2020, Qatar issued a formal request to discuss a potential purchase of the F-35 for the Qatar Emiri Air Force, but the U.S. government has a policy of providing Israel with a qualitative military edge, making such a purchase extremely unlikely.

=== Saudi Arabia ===
In March 2012, The Saudi Ministry of Defense was said to be keeping all options open for future fighter jet purchases, including notably the Boeing F-15SE Silent Eagle and the Lockheed Martin F-35.

In November 2017, Saudi Arabia again expressed interest in the F-35, following a similar expression from the United Arab Emirates a few days prior.

The potential sale of F-35 aircraft drew criticism with regards to maintaining Israel's qualitative military edge, a policy enshrined in U.S. law, as well as concerns regarding human rights violations during the Yemeni Civil War and Saudi Arabia's role therein. Additionally, concerns have been raised that procurement of the F-35 could spark a regional arms race.

=== Spain ===
The Spanish Navy amphibious assault ship Juan Carlos I is adapted to carry JSF and AV-8B Harrier.

JSF Program Executive Officer Air Force Major General Charles Davis said in 2008 that discussions had been held with Spain, which could eventually lead to the F-35B replacing the Spanish Navy's EAV-8B Harrier fleet.

In 2014 Spain decided to extend the lifespan of the Harriers to beyond 2025 as funding was not available to replace the type.

In November 2014 the Council of Ministers approved a section of 47.6 million euros to extend that of the AV-8B of the Spanish navy until 2034, the date on which the BPE Juan Carlos I is close to its withdrawal. It is not necessary to replace the AV-8B

In 2017 it was reported that the Spanish Air Force and Navy had a preference for the F-35 as a replacement for the Harrier and Hornet fighters. The decision needed to be reached by 2018 at the latest. It was expected to be one of the priorities of the Armed Forces Capacity Objective.

On November 22, 2017, the defense ministry declares that Spain is not interested in buying the F-35 in any of its variants

In April 2019, U.S. Vice Admiral and head of the Pentagon's F-35 office Mathias Winter submitted a written testimony to the U.S. House of Representatives in which Spain was identified as a "future potential Foreign Military Sales customer".

In June 2019, it was reported that the Spanish Navy and Spanish Air Force were as of May that year in the beginning stages of an analysis in which the F-35 is a key contender. The Spanish Navy is looking for the F-35B to replace its amphibious assault ship-based Harrier VTOL aircraft, and the Spanish Air Force is investigating the F-35A to replace its aging fleet of F-18 Hornet aircraft.

In March 2021, socialist deputy Zaida Cantera, spokesperson for the Defense Commission in Congress, stated: "The F-35 Bravo is a purely American aircraft. This purchase does not serve Europe. Strategic autonomy is important not only for military reasons, but also because European money finances industry, employment, research and technology in Europe."

On 9 November 2021, the Defense Ministry stated that there are no plans to join the F-35 project as Spain is fully committed to the FCAS.

However, on 15 November 2021, Greg Ulmer, Lockheed Martin's Vice President of Aeronautics, revealed that the Spanish government remains in contact with Lockheed Martin about a potential acquisition of F-35B jets, as the only possible replacement for fixed-wing fighter aircraft, for Spain's aging fleet of 13 VTOL Harrier II jets which operate from Spain's amphibious assault ship. Ulmer also stressed that "discussions with Spain were in the preliminary stages and had not progressed into classified briefings".

=== Ukraine ===
Ukraine has expressed interest in the F-35.

== Failed proposals ==
=== Indonesia ===
On 12 March 2020, Bloomberg reported that Indonesia canceled the Su-35 deal due to United States pressure. Indonesia is instead looking to negotiate the purchase of F-35 aircraft. On 18 March 2020, Indonesia's Deputy Defense Minister Sakti Wahyu Trenggono confirmed that the government could consider the purchase of the F-35.

On 15 October 2020, Indonesian defense minister Prabowo was told by the Trump administration that the US had refused to sell the F-35s to Indonesia, citing "production backlog" and "a 9-years waiting time."

It has been reported that the US has agreed to sell F/A-18E/F Super Hornets, F-15Es or F-16Vs instead of the F-35. In February 2022, the US State Department approved the sale of up to 36 F-15IDs, a proposed export version of the F-15EX Eagle II for the Indonesian Air Force, and related equipment to Indonesia worth around $13.9 billion.

=== Taiwan ===
Taiwan has requested to buy the F-35 from the US. However; this has been rejected by the US in fear of a critical response from China. In March 2009, Taiwan again was looking to buy U.S. fifth-generation fighter jets featuring stealth and vertical takeoff capabilities. However, in September 2011, during a visit to the US, the Deputy Minister of National Defense of Taiwan confirmed that while the country was busy upgrading its current F-16s it was still also looking to procure a next-generation aircraft such as the F-35. This received the usual critical response from China.

Taiwan renewed its push for an F-35 purchase under the Presidency of Donald Trump in early 2017, again causing criticism from China.

In March 2018, Taiwan once again reiterated its interest in the F-35 in light of an anticipated round of arms procurement from the United States. The F-35B STOVL variant is reportedly the political favorite as it would allow the Republic of China Air Force to continue operations after its limited number of runways were to be bombed in an escalation with the People's Republic of China. Following this renewed interest, senior U.S. senators publicly called for the sale of the F-35 to Taiwan as it would "retain a democracy in the face of threats from China".

In April 2018, however, it became clear that the U.S. government was reluctant about selling the F-35 to Taiwan over worries of Chinese spies within the Taiwanese military, possibly compromising classified data concerning the aircraft and granting Chinese military officials access.

In November 2018, it was reported that Taiwanese military leadership had abandoned the procurement of the F-35 in favor of a larger number of F-16V Viper aircraft. The decision was reportedly motivated by concerns about industry independence, as well as cost and previously raised espionage concerns.

=== United Arab Emirates ===
In 2010, the United Arab Emirates requested information about a possible sale of F-35s, however the United States delayed responding for months. The United States continued to decline requests by Gulf States including the United Arab Emirates until as late as 2015.

In early November 2017, the Trump administration agreed to consider the continued request by the United Arab Emirates for preliminary talks concerning potential sale of the F-35. Vice Chief of Staff of the United States Air Force Stephen W. Wilson confirmed on 11 November that preliminary talks were taking place with regional partner nations, later adding that included the United Arab Emirates. The potential sale of the F-35 to the United Arab Emirates raised concerns about maintaining Israel's Qualitative Military Edge, a policy also enshrined in US law. Additional skepticism was raised by senior US Air Force and Central Command personnel concerning the United Arab Emirates Air Force's plan to also jointly develop and procure a fifth-generation combat aircraft with Russia.

In November 2019, at the Dubai Air Show, US officials denied that the United Arab Emirates was a potential export nation.

In October 2020, the White House announced that the U.S. intended to sell 50 F-35s to the UAE. Due to the establishment of diplomatic relations between Israel and the UAE, Israel indicated it has no objections to a potential deal. On 10 November 2020, the Donald Trump administration sent a formal notification to the United States Congress about the sale of 50 F-35s to the United Arab Emirates, under an arms deal worth $23 billion. On 1 December 2020, the Human Rights Watch called to the US to stop selling weapons to the UAE, including the sale of F-35s. This advanced arms sale to the UAE was viewed by the Human Rights Watch as a threat to the humanitarian situation in conflict zones such as Yemen.

The UAE signed the deal to acquire 50 F-35s on 20 January 2021, just before the inauguration of Joe Biden as US president. After pausing the bill to review the sale, the Biden administration confirmed to move forward with the deal on 13 April 2021.

In December 2021, the United Arab Emirates unilaterally suspended talks with the US regarding the procurement, stating that technical requirements, sovereign operational restrictions, and cost/benefit analysis led to the re-assessment and suspension of the deal.

=== Thailand ===
The Royal Thai Air Force is seeking for multirole fighter to replace F-16A/B Block 15 ADF in service. On 31 December 2021, the RTAF Commander-in-chief announced that the Air Force proposes buying 8 to 12 F-35As in 2023. On 12 January 2022, Thailand's cabinet approved a budget for the first four F-35A, estimated at 13.8 billion baht in FY2023. On 22 May 2023, the United States Department of Defense has implied it will turn down Thailand's bid to buy F-35 fighter jets, and instead offer F-16 Block 70/72 Viper and F-15EX Eagle II fighters, a Royal Thai Air Force source said.

== Orders and procurement costs ==
Estimated cost of airplane in Low Rate Initial Production (LRIP) and Full Rate Production (FRP) batches:

Program year	Batch number	Lot number	Contract date	Qty. and variant	Unit cost (millions)*	Deliveries by year	Notes
2007	LRIP-1	I	Apr 2007	2 F-35A	$221.2 (excl. engine)	–	–
2007	LRIP-2	II	Jul 2007	6 F-35A; 6 F-35B	$161.7 (excl. engine)	–	Cost of the batch rose from initial 771 million to 1.15 billion. Batch includes 6 USAF and 6 USMC
2008	LRIP-3	III	May 2008	9 F-35A; 9 F-35B	$128.2 (avg. per unit) (excl. engine)	–	According to Pentagon, estimated engine costs are: F-35A – $16M, F-35B – $38M. Batch includes 1 F-35A for the Netherlands and 2 F-35B for the UK.
2009	LRIP-4	IV	Nov 2009	11 F-35A; 17 F-35B; 4 F-35C	F-35A – $111.6; F-35B – $109.4; F-35C – $142.9 (excl. engine)	–	First batch with a fixed price. Total batch price – $3.4 billion. Batch includes 1 F-35A for the Netherlands and 1 F-35B for the UK.
2011	LRIP-5	V	Dec 2011	22 F-35A; 3 F-35B; 7 F-35C	F-35A – $107; F-35B – $? F-35C – $? (excl. engine)	9	Total batch price – $4 billion
2012	LRIP-6	VI	Sep 2013	23 F-35A; 6 F-35B; 7 F-35C	F-35A – $103; F-35B – $109; F-35C – $120 (excl. engine)	29	Total batch price – $4.4 billion. Batch includes 2 F-35A for Australia and 3 F-35A for Italy.
2013	LRIP-7	VII	Sep 2013	24 F-35A; 7 F-35B; 4 F-35C	F-35A – $98; F-35B – $104; F-35C – $116 (excl. engine)	35	Total batch price – $11.45 billion. Batch includes 3 F-35A for Italy, 2 F-35A for Norway and 1 F-35B for the UK.
2014	LRIP-8	VIII	Nov 2014	29 F-35A; 10 F-35B; 4 F-35C	F-35A – $94.8; F-35B – $102; F-35C – $115.7 (excl. engine)	36	Total batch price – $4.6 billion for order of 43 units. Batch includes 2 F-35A for Israel, 2 F-35A for Italy, 4 F-35A for Japan, 2 F-35A for Norway and 4 F-35B for the UK.
2015	LRIP-9	IX	Nov 2015	41 F-35A; 12 F-35B; 2 F-35C	F-35A: $102.1; F-35B: $131.6; F-35C: $132.2 (includes engine)	45	Total batch price is $5.37 billion. Batch includes 6 F-35A for Norway, 7 F-35A for Israel, 2 F-35A for Japan and 6 F-35B for the UK.
2016	LRIP-10	X	2016	76 F-35A; 12 F-35B; 2 F-35C	F-35A: $94.6; F-35B: $122.8; F-35C: $121.8 (includes engine)	46	Total batch price is $9.5 billion. Batch includes 3 F-35B for UK, 6 F-35A for Norway, 8 F-35A for Australia, 2 F-35A for Turkey, 4 F-35A for Japan, 6 F-35A for Israel, 6 F-35A for South Korea
2017	LRIP-11	XI	2017	102 F-35A; 25 F-35B; 14 F-35C	F-35A: $89.2; F-35B: $115.5; F-35C: $107.7 (includes engine)	66	Batch includes 48 F-35A for USAF, 18 F-35B for USMC, 8 F-35C for USN/USMC, 8 F-35A for Netherlands, 6 F-35A for Norway, 4 F-35A for Turkey, 8 F-35A for Australia, 1 F-35A for Italy, 1 F-35B for United Kingdom, 22 F-35A for FMS customers.
2018	LRIP-12	XII	Oct 2019	149	F-35A: $82.4; F-35B: $108; F-35C: $103.1 (includes engine)	91	Batch includes 64 F-35A for the USAF, 26 F-35B for USMC, 16 F-35C for USN LRIP-12 was initially to be the first FRP batch. This has been delayed by the Pentagon
2019	LRIP-13	XIII	Oct 2019	160	F-35A: $79.2; F-35B: $104.8; F-35C: $98.1 (includes engine)	134	Lots 12, 13, and 14 includes a total of 478 aircraft (291 for the US Military, 127 for international partners, and 60 for FMS customers) with a total of 351 F-35A, 86 F-35B, and 41 F-35C variants. Total order price 34 billion. 400th Jet delivered in June 2019.
2020	LRIP-14	XIV	Oct 2019	169	F-35A: $77.9; F-35B: $101.3; F-35C: $94.4 (includes engine)	120	–
2023	LRIP-15	XV	Dec 2022	147		145	Lot 15 includes Technical Refresh-3 (TR-3), the modernized hardware needed to power Block 4 capabilities. TR-3 includes a new integrated core processor with greater computing power, a panoramic cockpit display and an enhanced memory unit. Full TR-3 capability was delayed due to software instability and supply chain bottlenecks, among other issues. Full TR-3 capability is expected in 2026. Lot 15 was delayed due to the COVID-19 pandemic.
2024	LRIP-16	XVI	Dec 2022			142	–
2025	LRIP-17	XVII	Dec 2022			191	Lot 17 includes the first F-35 aircraft for Belgium, Finland and Poland. Besides TR-3, Block 4 will bring a number of changes, including new or additional weapons, communications and networking upgrades, electronic warfare improvements, and cockpit and navigation enhancements. They are equipped with the new AN/APG-85 radar.
2026	LRIP-18	XVIII	Sep 2025	105 F-35A; 26 F-35B; 17 F-35C		148	
2027	LRIP-19	XIX	Sep 2025	105 F-35A; 26 F-35B; 17 F-35C		148	

- Post-2012 numbers are given in constant 2012 dollars.

== Orders ==
Operates F-35A, F-35B & F-35C variants (United States) Operates F-35A & F-35B variants (Italy, Japan) Operates F-35A variant only (Australia, Belgium, Canada, Denmark, Finland, Germany, Netherlands, Norway, Poland, South Korea) Operates F-35B variant only (United Kingdom) Operates F-35I variant only (Israel) Awaiting Delivery (Czech Republic, Greece, Romania, Singapore, Switzerland) Potential Orders & Procurement Programs (Portugal and Spain) Cancelled Orders (Turkey)

=== Confirmed Purchases ===
Confirmed orders to purchase the F-35.

Customer		Variant	Quantity
United States	Air Force	A	1763
United States	Marine Corps	B	280
United States	Marine Corps	C	140
United States	Navy	C	273
Japan		A	105
Japan		B	42
United Kingdom		B	48 (74 planned, down from 138)
Italy		A	75
Italy		B	40
South Korea		A	60
Australia		A	72
Netherlands		A	57 (down from 85)
Norway		A	52
Israel		I	75
Denmark		A	43
Belgium		A	34 (up to 45)
Poland		A	32
Turkey		A	0 (Order for 100 F-35As canceled)
Singapore		A	8
Singapore		B	12
Finland		A	64
Canada		A	88
Switzerland		A	36
Germany		A	35
Czech Republic		A	24
Greece		A	20 (up to 40)
Romania		A	32 (up to 48)

=== Potential Orders & Procurement Programs ===
Countries with on-going fighter jet procurement programs, who are considering the F-35 as a potential choice in their respective procurement programs. No final contract, nor resolute commitment made towards acquiring the F-35. Listed countries are actively engaged with Lockheed Martin and the U.S. in regards to the F-35.

Customer	Variant	Quantity	Notes
Portugal	A	27	The Portuguese Air Force intends to receive around 27 F-35 fighters to replace its F-16 fighters.
Spain	B	12	The Spanish Navy asks to eventually replace the AV-8B Harrier II instead of acquiring an aircraft carrier
United Kingdom	B	60, 80	60 batch 2, plus ~80 batch 3 planned

=== Initial Production Orders ===
Initial production orders to date.

Customer	Variant	Quantity	Order date	Note
USAF	A	2	27 July 2007	The only Lot I order.
USAF	A	6	22 May 2008	Lot II.
USMC	B	6	22 July 2008	Lot II
USAF	A	7	3 June 2009	Lot III.
USN	C	7	3 June 2009	Lot III
United Kingdom	B	2	3 June 2009	Lot III
Netherlands	A	1	3 June 2009	Lot III
USAF	A	10	22 September 2010	Lot IV
USN	C	4	22 September 2010	Lot IV
USMC	B	16	22 September 2010	Lot IV
UK	B	1	22 September 2010	Lot IV
Netherlands	A	1	8 April 2011	Lot IV
USAF	A	22	22 November 2010	Lot V
USN	C	7		Lot V
USMC	B	3		Lot V
Australia	A	14		inc two Lot VI, Lot number not known, these were initially to be British production aircraft.
Israel	I	20	October 2010	Planned delivery between 2015 and 2017. Possibly delayed to 2018.
UK	B	1	19 July 2012	Fourth test/example aircraft for the UK. Also announced the intention of an initial purchase of 48 operational F-35B (for the Royal Navy).
Italy	A	3		Lot VI

== Impact of COVID-19 ==
In early 2020, the COVID-19 pandemic impacted the F-35 global production and supply chain. In April 2020, Lockheed Martin announced an alternate week work schedule to compensate for the delay in getting supplies from vendors and entered into an agreement with International Association of Machinists and Aerospace Workers to use an alternate week work schedule.
