= Same-sex marriage in the Netherlands =

Same-sex marriage has been legal in the Netherlands since 1 April 2001. A bill for the legalisation of same-sex marriage was passed in the House of Representatives by 109 votes to 33 on 12 September 2000 and by the Senate by 49 votes to 26 on 19 December. The law received royal assent by Queen Beatrix on 21 December, and took effect on 1 April 2001. The Netherlands was the first country in the world to legalize same-sex marriage. Polling suggests that a significant majority of Dutch people support the legal recognition of same-sex marriage.

Same-sex marriage has been legal in Bonaire, Sint Eustatius and Saba, special municipalities of the Netherlands, since 10 October 2012, and in the constituent countries of Aruba and Curaçao since 12 July 2024. The other constituent country of the Kingdom of the Netherlands, Sint Maarten, does not perform or fully recognize same-sex marriages.

== Unregistered cohabitation ==
Unregistered cohabitation (samenwonen) occurs when a same-sex or opposite-sex couple cohabits but chooses to keep the legal status of their relationship unregistered or informal. This means all worldwide assets that belong to a single party remain the sole property of the party with no legal entitlement by the other party, whether owned before or acquired during the relationship. The couple can record a contract (samenlevingscontract) with a notary to receive some limited financial benefits, including for tax and pension purposes. However, the benefits are limited, e.g. the father or non-biological mother is not automatically recognized as a parent after the birth of a child, and upon the death of one of the partners, the other partner is not considered an heir. This legal status of unregistered partnerships is respected by Dutch courts.

The Netherlands was one of the first countries in the world to recognise cohabiting same-sex couples by law. The first law recognising the cohabitation of same-sex couples was passed in 1979 for the purposes of rent law. Further legislation was passed in 1981 to recognise cohabiting couples for the purposes of inheritance tax.

== Registered partnerships ==
On 1 January 1998, registered partnerships (Dutch: geregistreerd partnerschap, pronounced [ɣəreːɣɪˈstreːrt ˈpɑrtnərsxɑp]) (Note: West Frisian: registrearre partnerskip, pronounced [rɛːɣiˈstrjɛrə ˈpaːtnr̩skɪp]; Papiamento: union civil, pronounced [uˈnjon siˈvil]; Limburgish: gerezjistreerd partnersjap) were introduced in Dutch law. The partnerships were meant for same-sex couples as an alternative to marriage, though they can also be entered into by opposite-sex couples, and in fact about one third of the registered partnerships between 1999 and 2001 were of opposite-sex couples. In law, registered partnerships and marriage convey the same rights and duties, especially after some laws were changed to remedy inequalities with respect to inheritance and some other issues.

Partnerships have become particularly common among Dutch couples, with about 18,000 new partnerships registered every year.

== Same-sex marriage ==
=== Legislative action ===
As early as the mid 1980s, a group of gay rights activists, headed by Henk Krol, editor-in-chief of the Gay Krant, asked the government to allow same-sex couples to marry. By 1995, about 100 municipalities had opened an alternative "marriage register", into which some 300 same-sex couples had inscribed. That year, the municipality of Rheden said that if the government did not legalize same-sex marriage it would proceed with conducting same-sex weddings. Haarlem declared it would do the same or stop issuing marriage licenses altogether. The States General of the Netherlands decided in 1995 to create a special commission to investigate the possibility of recognizing same-sex marriages. At that time, the Christian Democratic Appeal was not part of the ruling coalition for the first time since the introduction of full democracy. The special commission finished its work in 1997 and concluded that civil marriage should be extended to include same-sex couples. After the 1998 general election, the Second Kok Cabinet promised to tackle the issue. In September 2000, the legislation was debated in the Dutch Parliament. The marriage bill passed the House of Representatives by 109 votes to 33 on 12 September 2000.

12 September 2000 vote in the House of Representatives
Party	Voted for	Voted against	Absent (Did not vote)
G Labour Party	41: Nebahat Albayrak; Khadija Arib; Marleen Barth; Judith Belinfante; Jet Bussemaker; Ferd Crone; Margreeth de Boer; Dick de Cloe; Sharon Dijksma; Jeroen Dijsselbloem; Desirée Duijkers; Adri Duivesteijn; Jaap Jelle Feenstra; Wouter Gortzak; Mariëtte Hamer; Willem Herrebrugh; Rik Hindriks; Bert Koenders; Lucy Kortram; Arie Kuijper; Ad Melkert; Bert Middel; Hillie Molenaar; Saskia Noorman-den Uyl; Rob Oudkerk; Peter Rehwinkel; Usman Santi; Gerrit Schoenmakers; José Smits; Laurette Spoelman; Frans Timmermans; Gerrit Valk; Annet van der Hoek; Rob van Gijzel; Peter van Heemst; Jeltje van Nieuwenhoven; Jan van Zijl; Harm Evert Waalkens; Marja Wagenaar; Tineke Witteveen-Hevinga; Martin Zijlstra	1: Thanasis Apostolou	3: Ella Kalsbeek; Willie Swildens-Rozendaal; Gerritjan van Oven
G People's Party for Freedom and Democracy	36: Eric Balemans; Jan Dirk Blaauw; Stef Blok; Sam Cherribi; Clemens Cornielje; Ton de Swart; Bibi de Vries; Hans Dijkstal; Jan Geluk; Enric Hessing; Pieter Hofstra; Henk Kamp; Jan Hendrik Klein Molekamp; Ruud Luchtenveld; Els Meijer; Atzo Nicolaï; Jacques Niederer; Gert-Jan Oplaat; Fadime Örgü; Wim Passtoors; Patricia Remak; Jan Rijpstra; Janneke Snijder-Hazelhoff; Jan te Veldhuis; Thijs Udo; Hans van Baalen; Willibrord van Beek; Anke van Blerck-Woerdman; Theo van den Doel; Marijke van Lente; Nellie Verbugt; Otto Vos; Hella Voûte-Droste; Frans Weekers; Frans Weisglas; Geert Wilders	–	2: Michiel Patijn; Erica Terpstra
Christian Democratic Appeal	3: Nancy Dankers; Gerda Verburg; Joop Wijn	24: Jan Peter Balkenende; Pieter Jan Biesheuvel; Ank Bijleveld-Schouten; Siem Buijs; Henk de Haan; Jaap de Hoop Scheffer; Camiel Eurlings; Hans Hillen; Gerd Leers; Theo Meijer; Aart Mosterd; Jakob Reitsma; Theo Rietkerk; Clémence Ross-van Dorp; Annie Schreijer-Pierik; Theo Stroeken; Agnes van Ardenne-van der Hoeven; Wim van de Camp; Hans van den Akker; Maria van der Hoeven; Cees van der Knaap; Peter van Wijmen; Maxime Verhagen; Marry Visser-van Doorn	2: Joop Atsma; Klaasje Eisses-Timmerman
G Democrats 66	14: Marijke Augusteijn-Esser; Bert Bakker; Thom de Graaf; Boris Dittrich; Francine Giskes; Jan Hoekema; Ursie Lambrechts; Francisca Ravestein; Olga Scheltema-de Nie; Arthie Schimmel; Pieter ter Veer; Nicky van 't Riet; Stefanie van Vliet; Jan van Walsem	–	–
GroenLinks	10: Femke Halsema; Ab Harrewijn; Corrie Hermann; Farah Karimi; Mohamed Rabbae; Paul Rosenmöller; Hugo van der Steenhoven; Ineke van Gent; Kees Vendrik; Marijke Vos	–	1: Tara Singh Varma
Socialist Party	5: Jan de Wit; Agnes Kant; Jan Marijnissen; Remi Poppe; Harry van Bommel	–	–
Christian Union	–	5: André Rouvoet (Note: Was originally a member of the Reformatory Political Federation (RPF).); Gert Schutte (Note: Was originally a member of the Reformed Political League (GPV).); Dick Stellingwerf; Leen van Dijke; Eimert van Middelkoop	–
Reformed Political Party	–	3: Koos van den Berg; Kees van der Staaij; Bas van der Vlies	–
Total	109	33	8
Total	72.7%	22.0%	5.3%

The Senate approved the bill on 19 December 2000 by 49 to 26 votes. Only the Christian parties, which held 26 of the 75 seats at the time, voted against the bill. Although the Christian Democratic Appeal would form the next government, they did not indicate any intention to repeal the law.

19 December 2000 vote in the Senate
Party	Voted for	Voted against	Absent (Did not vote)
Christian Democratic Appeal	–	20: Joeke Baarda; Marie-Louise Bemelmans-Videc; Peter Boorsma; Gerrit Braks; Alfons Dölle; Huib Eversdijk; Henk Hofstede; Wolter Lemstra; Tineke Lodders-Elfferich; Jan Pastoor; Willem Stevens; Yvonne Timmerman-Buck; Rob van de Beeten; Jannie van den Hul-Omta; René van der Linden; Jos van Gennip; Hannie van Leeuwen; Kobus Walsma; Jos Werner; Henk Woldring	–
G People's Party for Freedom and Democracy	19: Fransje Roscam Abbing-Bos; Frits Korthals Altes; Pol de Beer; Cobi de Blécourt-Maas; Ad de Jager; Dick Dees; Heleen Dupuis; Leendert Ginjaar; Niek Ketting; Liesbeth Kneppers-Heynert; Paul Luijten; Jaap Rensema; Uri Rosenthal; Paul Swenker; Marbeth Bierman-Beukema toe Water; Nicoline van den Broek-Laman Trip; Wim van Eekelen; Jan van Heukelum; Marius Varekamp	–	–
G Labour Party	15: Geertje Lycklama à Nijeholt; Frits Castricum; Ton Doesburg; Ria Jaarsma; Erik Jurgens; Fré le Poole; Margriet Meindertsma; Ruby Rabbinge; Johan Stekelenburg; Ing Yoe Tan; Elske ter Veld; Ed van Thijn; Willem Witteveen; Dik Wolfson; Thijs Wöltgens	–	–
GroenLinks	8: Wim de Boer; Diana de Wolff; Tom Pitstra; Leo Platvoet; Cobi Schoondergang-Horikx; Jos van der Lans; Bob van Schijndel; Ans Zwerver	–	–
G Democrats 66	4: Ruud Hessing; Jacob Kohnstamm; Eddy Schuyer; Jan Terlouw	–	–
Christian Union	–	4: Jurn de Vries; Egbert Schuurman; Cees van Bruchem; Kars Veling	–
Socialist Party	2: Bob Ruers; Driek van Vugt	–	–
Reformed Political Party	–	2: Gerrit Holdijk; Gert van den Berg	–
Independent Senate Group	1: Marten Bierman	–	–
Total	49	26	0
Total	65.3%	34.7%	0.0%

Queen Beatrix gave her royal assent to the legislation on 21 December 2000. The main article of the law changed article 1:30 of the Burgerlijk Wetboek to read as follows:

- in Dutch: Een huwelijk kan worden aangegaan door twee personen van verschillend of van gelijk geslacht.
- in West Frisian: In houlik kin sletten wurde troch twa persoanen fan ferskillende of itselde geslacht.

(A marriage can be entered into by two persons of different or the same sex.)

The law came into effect on 1 April 2001, and on that day four same-sex couples were married by the Mayor of Amsterdam, Job Cohen, who became a registrar specifically to officiate at the weddings. A few months earlier, Cohen had been junior Minister of Justice of the Netherlands and was responsible for putting the new marriage and adoption laws through Parliament.

In Dutch, same-sex marriage is known as huwelijk tussen personen van gelijk geslacht or more commonly as homohuwelijk (pronounced [ˈɦoːmoːˌɦyʋələk]). Similarly, in West Frisian, it is known as houlik tusken persoanen fan itselde geslacht or more commonly as homohoulik (pronounced [ˈhoːmoːˌhɔu̯lək]).

=== Requirements and rights ===
Laws regarding same-sex partnerships in Europe¹ Marriage Civil union Limited domestic recognition (cohabitation) Unrecognized Constitution limits marriage to opposite-sex couples ¹ May include recent laws or court decisions that have not yet entered into effect.

Dutch law requires that either partner have Dutch nationality or have residency in the Netherlands. The marriageable age in the Netherlands is 18. The law is only valid in the European territory of the Netherlands and on the Caribbean islands of Bonaire, Sint Eustatius and Saba, but does not apply to the other constituent countries of the Kingdom of the Netherlands.

The only legal difference between same-sex and different-sex marriages was that, in the former, parentage by both partners was not automatic. Under Dutch civil law, the legal mother of a child is the biological mother (article 1:198), while the father is, in principle, the man to whom she is married or with whom she has a registered partnership at the time of birth. Additionally, the father must be male (article 1:199). As a result, for lesbian couples, the non-biological partner could only become a legal parent through adoption. However, when the biological father did not acquire legal parenthood—such as in cases of artificial insemination—the two female spouses could automatically obtain joint parental authority (article 1:253sa). In December 2013, the Dutch Parliament amended the law to allow automatic parenthood for lesbian couples. The new law, which came into effect on 1 April 2014, stipulates that the co-mother in a marriage or registered partnership with the biological mother is automatically recognized as a legal parent if the sperm donor is anonymous. In cases involving a known donor, the biological mother decides whether the donor or the co-mother will be the child's second legal parent.

On 6 April 2016, Minister of Foreign Affairs Bert Koenders and Minister of Security and Justice Ard van der Steur confirmed the Dutch position that, like other couples, same-sex couples who are not Dutch residents or nationals cannot marry in the country. The ministers argued that it might lead to "practical and legal problems" and could even be "dangerous" to some participants. The move came after the Liberal Democratic Party had asked the ministers to look into allowing non-resident foreigners to take advantage of the Netherlands' same-sex marriage law.

=== Aruba, Curaçao and Sint Maarten ===
Marriage Limited recognition

Aruba, Curaçao and Sint Maarten have separate civil codes from the Netherlands. As a result, same-sex marriage was not automatically legalised in these constituent countries by the 2001 law. On 12 July 2024, the Supreme Court of the Netherlands upheld a lower court ruling that the same-sex marriage bans in Aruba and Curaçao were discriminatory and unconstitutional, effectively legalising same-sex marriage in both constituent countries. This makes Sint Maarten the only constituent country where same-sex marriages cannot be performed, though Dutch marriages are recognized there to some extent. Indeed, all territories of the Kingdom register same-sex marriages performed in the Netherlands following an earlier Supreme Court ruling. In 2007, the court ruled that all vital records recorded within the Kingdom are valid throughout its constituent countries, based on its interpretation of the Charter for the Kingdom of the Netherlands. However, subsequent rulings have clarified that same-sex marriages are not automatically entitled to the same privileges (e.g. social security) as opposite sex marriages.

Aruba has also recognised registered partnerships offering several of the rights and benefits of marriage since September 2021. Curaçao and Sint Maarten do not perform registered partnerships.

=== Bonaire, Sint Eustatius and Saba ===
Same-sex marriage became legal in the Caribbean Netherlands—Bonaire, Sint Eustatius and Saba—following the entry into force of a law enabling same-sex couples to marry on 10 October 2012.

=== Opposition ===
In 2007, controversy arose when the new Fourth Balkenende Cabinet announced in its policy statement that officials who objected to same-sex marriage on principle could refuse to marry such couples. Some municipal councils governed by the Labour Party and GroenLinks opposed this policy, arguing that the job of a registrar is to marry all couples, not only opposite-sex couples. The opposition parties stated that if a registrar opposed same-sex marriages, they should not hold that post. The municipality of Amsterdam announced that it would not comply with this policy, and that registrars there would still be obliged to marry same-sex couples. In reaction, many other municipalities announced their rejection of the proposal as well. The cabinet claimed that this issue lay solely within the remit of the central government. In practice, municipalities could decide whether or not to hire registrars who object to marrying same-sex couples.

In 2014, Parliament passed a law that made it illegal for marriage officiants to refuse their services to same-sex couples. Previously, they could refuse to marry same-sex couples as long as municipalities ensured that other officiants were available to solemnize the marriages.

=== Royal same-sex weddings ===
In October 2021, Prime Minister Mark Rutte confirmed that members of the Dutch royal family may enter into same-sex marriages without having to forfeit the crown, or lose their royal title and privileges or their place in the line of succession. Previously, the government had held that if an heir wanted to marry a partner of the same sex, they would have to forfeit their right to the throne.

=== Impact ===
A 2021 study by economists Shuai Chen and Jan van Ours showed that from 2001 onwards levels of anxiety and depression fell drastically among individuals in same-sex relationships and largely converged to those of heterosexuals. Chen and van Ours found that the legalisation of same-sex marriage, as well as supportive societal attitudes, significantly improved the mental health of LGBT people. They concluded, "We find a significant improvement in the mental health of sexual minorities following the legislation. We also find that marriage itself was only partially responsible for the amelioration of mental health among sexual minorities. More importantly, the legal recognition of same-sex marriage improved mental health for both male and female sexual minorities irrespective of their own marital status."

=== Statistics ===
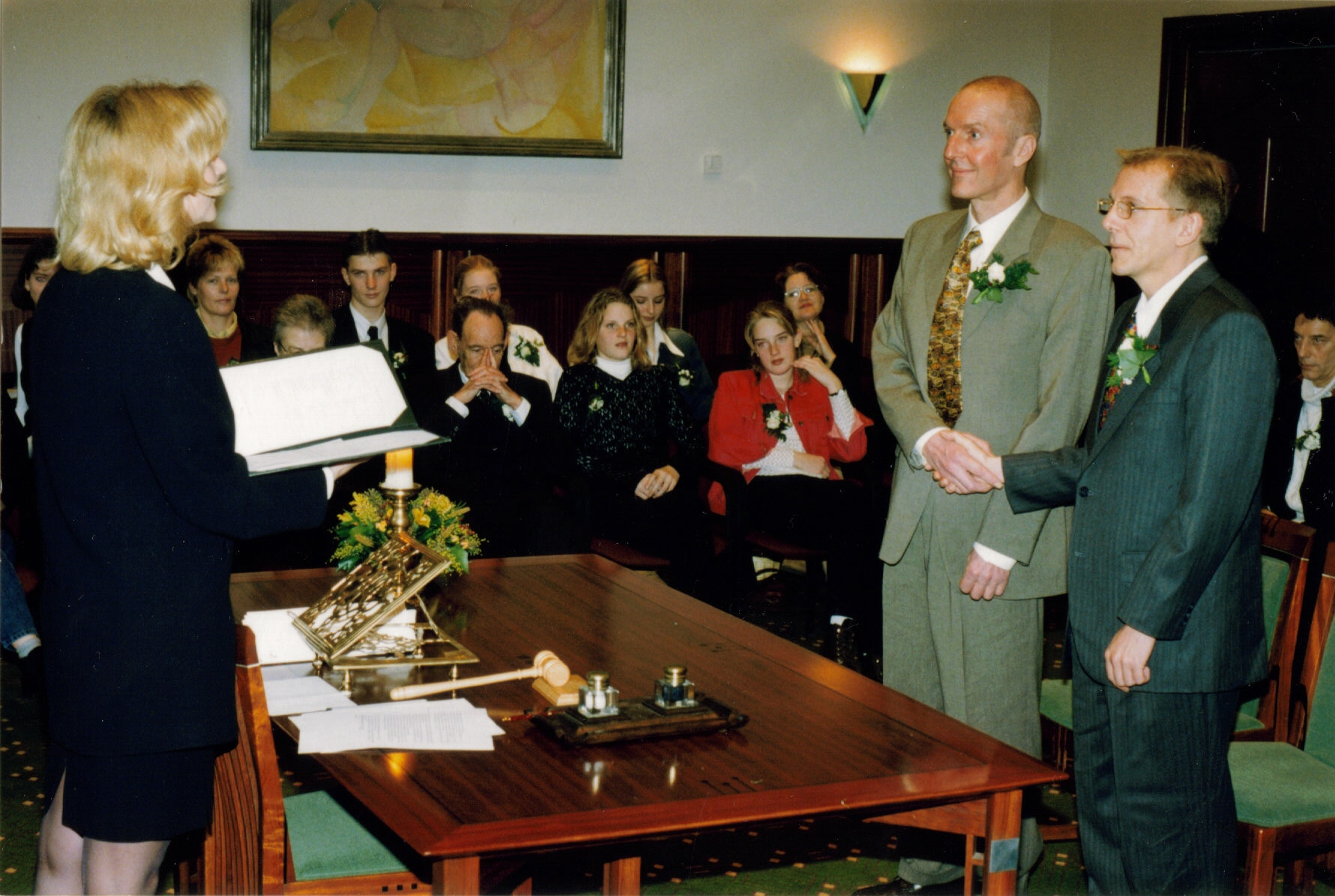
Two men marrying in Amsterdam on 1 April 2001, the first day in which the possibility to marry was opened to same-sex couples.

According to provisional figures from Statistics Netherlands, same-sex marriages made up 3% of the total number of marriages performed in 2001: a peak of around 6% in the first month followed by around 3% in the remaining months, about 1,339 male couples and 1,075 female couples in total. By June 2004, more than 6,000 same-sex marriages had been performed in the Netherlands. 14,814 same-sex marriages were performed in the Netherlands from 2001 to the end of 2010; 7,525 between two women and 7,289 between two men. There were also 1,078 same-sex divorces during this period. By 2015, 21,331 same-sex couples had married in the Netherlands; 11,196 female couples and 10,135 male couples.

On 1 April 2021, 20 years after same-sex marriage was legalized in the Netherlands, Statistics Netherlands reported that over 28,000 same-sex couples had married in the country by that time. Roughly 20,000 of these couples were still together; the remaining having divorced, moved abroad or one or both of the spouses died. Female couples were more likely to divorce, at around 26%, than heterosexual couples at 16%, and male couples at 14%. According to Statistics Netherlands, 36,270 same-sex marriages had been performed by the end of 2025:

Number of marriages performed in the Netherlands
Year	Same-sex marriages			Opposite-sex marriages	Total marriages	% same-sex
Year	Female	Male	Total	Opposite-sex marriages	Total marriages	% same-sex
2001	1,075	1,339	2,414	79,677	82,091	2.94%
2002	903	935	1,838	83,970	85,808	2.14%
2003	764	735	1,499	78,928	80,427	1.86%
2004	631	579	1,210	72,231	73,441	1.65%
2005	580	570	1,150	71,113	72,263	1.59%
2006	633	579	1,212	71,157	72,369	1.67%
2007	708	663	1,371	71,114	72,485	1.89%
2008	752	656	1,408	74,030	75,438	1.87%
2009	785	573	1,358	72,119	73,477	1.85%
2010	694	660	1,354	74,045	75,399	1.80%
2011	754	601	1,355	70,217	71,572	1.89%
2012	741	544	1,285	69,030	70,315	1.83%
2013	700	522	1,222	63,327	64,549	1.89%
2014	727	532	1,259	64,074	65,333	1.93%
2015	749	647	1,396	62,912	64,308	2.17%
2016	771	665	1,436	63,813	65,249	2.20%
2017	755	620	1,375	63,027	64,402	2.14%
2018	820	682	1,502	62,813	64,315	2.34%
2019	744	675	1,419	62,146	63,565	2.23%
2020	666	448	1,114	49,119	50,233	2.22%
2021	665	527	1,192	55,227	56,419	2.11%
2022	949	765	1,714	68,894	70,608	2.43%
2023	827	799	1,626	66,333	67,959	2.39%
2024	942	832	1,774	66,908	68,682	2.58%
2025	994	793	1,787	68,354	70,141	2.55%

=== Religious performance ===
Since the mid-1960s, religious solemnizations of same-sex relationships have taken place in some Dutch churches. The Remonstrants were Europe's first Christian denomination to officially allow such solemnizations in 1986. The first Remonstrant church marriage for two men was performed at Vrijburg in Amsterdam on 31 January 1987. The Mennonite Church in the Netherlands also allows solemnizations of same-sex marriages, while the Old Catholic Church of the Netherlands has allowed its ministers to perform same-sex marriages in its places of worship since 2006.

The Protestant Church in the Netherlands, the largest Protestant denomination in the Netherlands, has allowed its congregations to perform same-sex marriages as "a union of love and faith before God" since 2004, and in practice many churches now conduct such ceremonies. The Protestant Church was formed in 2004 by the merger of three Calvinist and Lutheran churches. The Evangelich Lutheran Church, one of these three churches, officially stated in 1995 that "there are no theological arguments against blessing same-sex couples", and many Lutheran congregations performed blessings of same-sex unions. In March 1979, a priest of the Dutch Reformed Church performed a "special but public church service" in Groningen in which two men "express[ed] the profound significance of their relationship, promise[d] fidelity to each other, and pray[ed] for their friendship". Conservative Protestants protested the decision.

The Catholic Church opposes same-sex marriage and does not allow its priests to officiate at such marriages. In 1983, the union of two Protestant women, Harmanna Kalsbeek and Ria Bultena, was blessed at St. Joseph Cathedral in Groningen. While the blessing was meant to be secret, it was leaked to the media. The priest issued a public apology. In December 2023, the Holy See published Fiducia supplicans, a declaration allowing Catholic priests to bless couples who are not considered to be married according to church teaching, including the blessing of same-sex couples. Several bishops welcomed the declaration. The Bishops' Conference of the Netherlands also expressed its support, stating that the church is "a welcoming church which will not deny anyone the support and succour of God", but emphasised its views that marriage is "only possible between a man and a woman".

== Public opinion ==
According to an Ifop poll conducted in May 2013, 85% of Dutch people supported allowing same-sex couples to marry and adopt children.

The 2015 Eurobarometer found that 91% of the Dutch population thought same-sex marriage should be allowed throughout Europe, while 7% were opposed. A Pew Research Center poll, conducted between April and August 2017 and published in May 2018, showed that 86% of Dutch people supported same-sex marriage, 10% were opposed and 4% did not know or had refused to answer. When divided by religion, 95% of religiously unaffiliated people, 90% of non-practicing Christians and 60% of church-attending Christians supported same-sex marriage. Opposition was also 10% among 18–34-year-olds.

The 2019 Eurobarometer found that 92% of Dutch people thought same-sex marriage should be allowed throughout Europe, while 8% were opposed. A Pew Research Center poll conducted between February and May 2023 showed that 89% of Dutch people supported same-sex marriage, 10% were opposed and 1% did not know or had refused to answer. When divided by political affiliation, support was highest among those on the left of the political spectrum at 94%, followed by those at the center at 92% and those on the right at 85%. Women (92%) were also more likely to support same-sex marriage than men (86%). The 2023 Eurobarometer found that support had increased to 94%, while 5% were opposed. The survey also showed that 94% of Dutch people thought that "there is nothing wrong in a sexual relationship between two persons of the same sex", while 6% disagreed.

== See also ==
- LGBT rights in the Netherlands
- Same-sex marriage in Bonaire, Sint Eustatius and Saba
- Same-sex marriage in Aruba, Curaçao and Sint Maarten
- Samenlevingscontract
- Same-sex marriage in Belgium
- Same-sex marriage in France
- Same-sex marriage in Germany
- Same-sex marriage in Luxembourg
- Same-sex marriage in the United Kingdom
- Recognition of same-sex unions in Europe
