= List of members of the Senate of the Netherlands for Christian Union =

This is a list of all members of the Senate of the Netherlands for Christian Union.

== List ==
| Name | Begin date | End date | Ref. |
|---|---|---|---|
| Mirjam Bikker | 9 June 2015 | 12 September 2016 | |
| Mirjam Bikker | 21 December 2016 | 30 March 2021 | |
| Remmelt de Boer | 12 June 2007 | 7 June 2011 | |
| Cees van Bruchem | 27 March 2001 (Note: Was previously member of the Senate for RPF.) | 9 June 2003 | |
| Peter Ester | 7 June 2011 | 11 December 2022 | |
| Bert Groen | 28 May 2002 | 9 June 2003 | |
| Eric Holterhues | 13 June 2023 | | |
| Tineke Huizinga | 11 June 2019 | | |
| Simone Kennedy | 17 January 2023 | 12 June 2023 | |
| Roel Kuiper | 12 June 2007 | 10 June 2019 | |
| Flora Lagerwerf-Vergunst | 12 June 2007 | 7 June 2011 | |
| Eimert van Middelkoop | 10 June 2003 | 21 February 2007 | |
| Egbert Schuurman | 27 March 2001 | 7 June 2011 | |
| Herman Sietsma | 13 September 2016 | 21 December 2016 | |
| Hendrik-Jan Talsma | 6 April 2021 | | |
| Kars Veling | 27 March 2001 (Note: Was previously member of the Senate for GPV) | 14 May 2002 | |
| Maarten Verkerk | 11 June 2019 | 12 June 2023 | |
| Jurn de Vries | 27 March 2001 | 9 June 2003 | |
| Jurn de Vries | 27 February 2007 | 12 June 2007 | |
