= Bart Verbrugh =

Dutch politician (1916–2003)

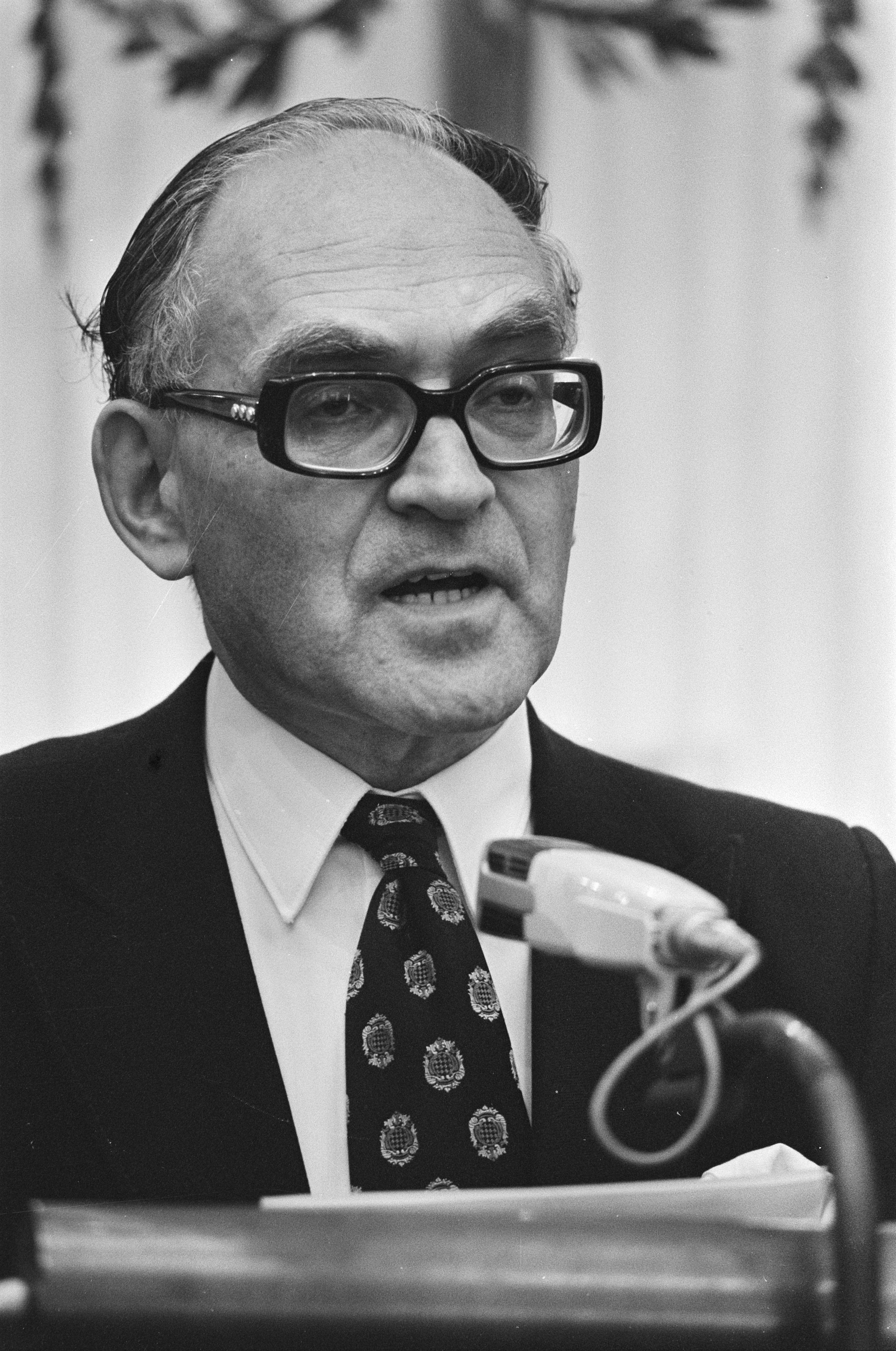
- Dutch House of Representatives debate Verbrugh (GPV) questions about defense memorandum

Member of the House of Representatives
- In office 1971–1981

Personal details
- Born: 19 July 1916 Den Haag
- Died: 5 February 2003 (aged 86) Dordrecht
- Party: GPV

Albertus Johannes (Bart) Verbrugh (July 19, 1916 in The Hague – February 5, 2003 in Dordrecht) was a Dutch politician and chemist. He was an MP for the Reformed Political League (GPV) from 1971 to 1981, serving as the GPV's parliamentary leader in the House of Representatives between 1977 and 1981.

== Early life ==
Verbrugh was born on 19 July 1916 to a liberal family in The Hague. At the age of 20 in 1936, he converted and became a member of the Reformed Churches in the Netherlands. He studied physical chemistry at the Hogere Technische School in Dordrecht, where he would later become a chemistry teacher. In 1940, he went to the Dutch East Indies to work as a research chemist at the Rubber Experiment Station in Bogor, and he would be imprisoned in an internment camp during the Japanese occupation of the Dutch East Indies from 1942 to 1945.

On his return to the Netherlands in 1946, he joined the Reformed Church (Liberated), which had split off from the mainstream Reformed Church two years prior.

In the 1950s, Verbrugh joined the GPV's administrative council ("Generale Verbondsraad"), and was the only one of its members to be reelected in 1960 following internal party conflicts. In 1966, he helped found the "Nationaal Evangelisch Verband", an organisation of former ARP members who thought their own party was not Christian enough and initially saw the GPV as the only real alternative and would go on to found the RPF in the 1970s. After the non-Liberated NEV broke with the GPV in 1972, he would found the Foundation for National Christian Politics in 1974, which was disbanded in 1980.

== Political career ==
In the 1971 Dutch general election, Bart Verbrugh was first elected to the House of Representatives for the GPV. In 1977, he would succeed Piet Jongeling as the party's parliamentary leader. In the House of Representatives, Verbrugh adopted a more confrontational and ideological stance than his relatively pragmatic predecessor, but his complicated and intellectual style and his reluctance to enter the spotlight caused many to label him as uncharismatic. In 1981, he was replaced as party leader and MP by Gert Schutte.

== Ideology ==
Verbrugh's early ideology was heavily inspired by the thought of Reformed theologian Arnold van Ruler, and while he would moderate as leader of the GPV Van Ruler's theocratic ideology would continue to be a huge influence on the ideology of Verbrugh and with him the GPV as a whole. Arnold van Ruler heavily criticized the mainstream Protestant parties of his day, the ARP and CHU, arguing that they had capitulated to the "pagan" secular state, and argued for the establishment of a Christian theocracy. In a 1948 document, Verburgh argued for a Christian state involving the disenfranchisement of "open unbelievers", the banning of political parties that did not uphold God's honour and the founding of a Supreme Court which could strike down laws inconsistent with Christian principles. In contrast to Van Ruler and other orthodox Protestants such as the SGP however, Verbrugh never adopted the theocracy label, but he would never come to accept the principles of secular democracy.

Verbrugh served as the main ideologue of the GPV throughout his political career. As a member of that party, he would become the main advocate for a "National Reformed" ideology, which formed the basis of the ideological program adopted by the GPV in 1966. This had two main pillars; the first being rewriting the Dutch constitution based on Christian principles. Verbrugh had repudiated his earlier stance on disenfranchisement and party bans, but continued to advocate for a Supreme Court, appointed by the monarch, to uphold Christian principles. The second was the Calvinist cultural mandate, which implied the need for further cultivation and urban expansion in the Netherlands. Verbrugh also argued for the colonisation of Dutch Suriname and New Guinea with Dutch families, which would be barred from intermarrying with or employing local servants to ensure ethnic homogeneity and the protection of Dutch culture, and who would participate in evangelising and civilising the native population of these regions.

Verbrugh was a staunch opponent of abortion, proposing a full ban in 1981 together with Hette Abma of the SGP, which was roundly rejected by most other parties. He also argued for the necessity of a strong military. Internationally, he was a strong supporter of Apartheid, using Acts 17:26 to justify the policies of the South African government, and an opponent of European integration, seen by him as threatening national sovereignty and the position of the Dutch monarchy.

== Later life ==
Although his power and ideological role would decline within the party from the 1980s, he continued to wield some influence within the GPV. In 1994, together with RPF member Roel Kuiper, he argued for an electoral alliance between the GPV and RPF following their failure to capitalise on the decline of the CDA in the 1994 Dutch general election. However, he would sour on this cooperation when it became clear the new Christian Union would largely reject his own ideology. On 5 February 2003, Bart Verbrugh died in Dordrecht.
