= Mayken Tooris =

Victim of witch persecution in the Spanish Netherlands (1594-1652)

- Born: 1594; Nieuwpoort, Spanish Netherlands
- Died: 10 February 1652 (aged 58); Nieuwpoort, Spanish Netherlands
- Other name: Nassel
- Occupation: Shrimp vendor
- Known for: Victim of witch trials

Mayken Tooris also known as Nassel (1594 – 10 February 1652) was a shrimp vendor from Nieuwpoort who was executed during the witch trials in Europe. She was accused of witchcraft and confessed under duress to having lived with the devil for nineteen years.

Tooris was married to Pieter Carton but left him. She was friends with Jeanne Panne, who was executed two years before her.

Tooris claimed that the devil, whom she called Geernaertje, first appeared to her at the age of twenty in the form of a sixteen-year-old boy dressed as a fisherman. In return for a basket of shrimp, she gave him her soul and received a diabolical mark under her right breast. She lived with him as man and wife, despite his foul odor, and had sexual relations with him that the court described as "abominable" and "against female decency".

According to testimony, Mayken flew through the city at night, danced with other witches and demons on the Castle grounds of Nieuwpoort, and bewitched townspeople by poisoning wine and giving cursed fruit. She was also accused of transforming into a crow and sinking fishermen’s boats at sea alongside her demonic companion.

She was convicted of witchcraft by the magistrates of Nieuwpoort and executed by burning on 10 February 1652 at the age of 58 years old.

== 2012 rehabilitation ==
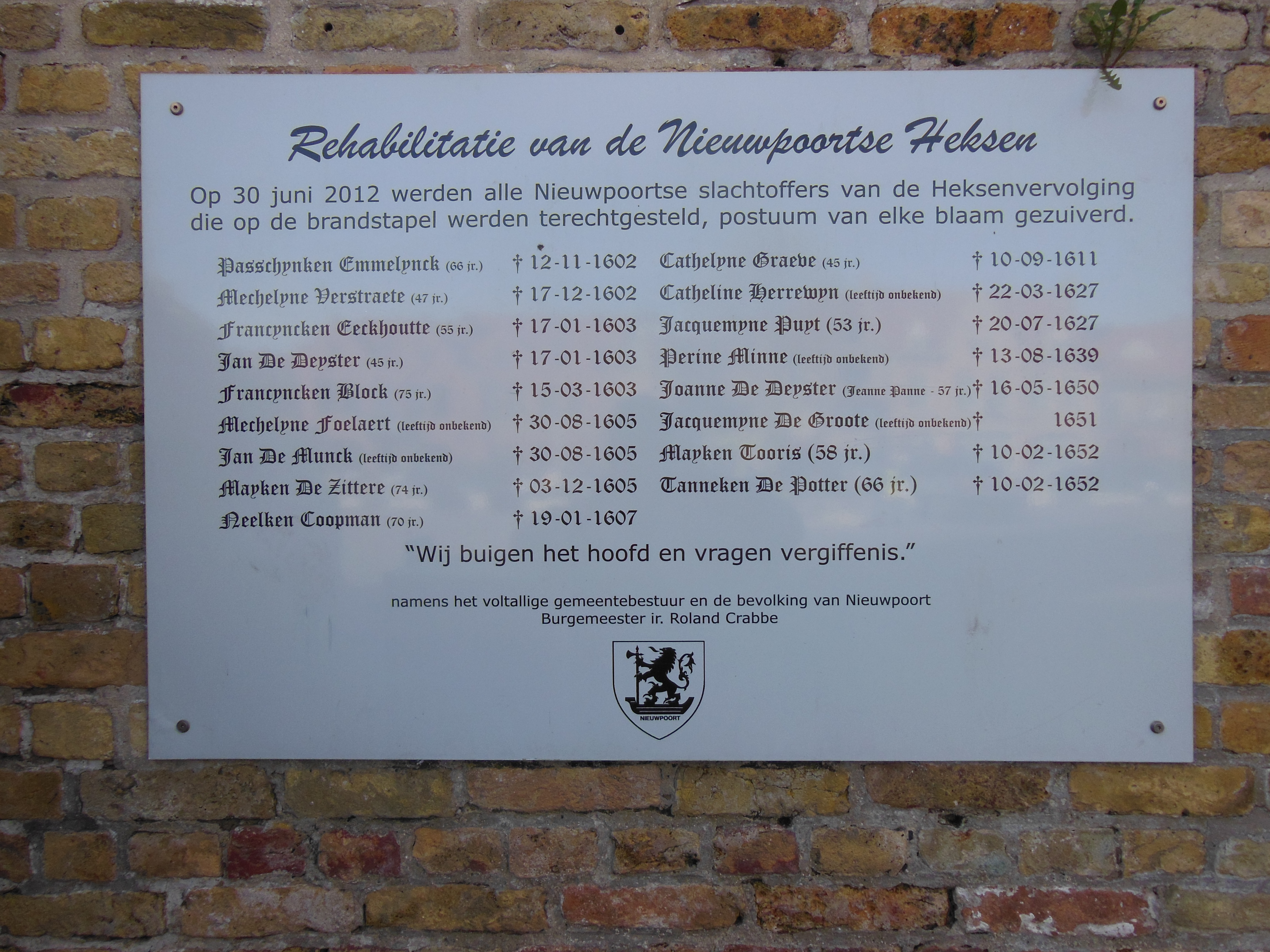
Tooris on a memorial plaque in Nieuwpoort

On 2 July 2012 the city of Nieuwpoort posthumously rehabilitated the victims of the witch trials. The rehabilitation was carried out on behalf of the entire municipal council and the population of Nieuwpoort, including Mayor Roland Crabbe. Fifteen women and two men were burned at the stake as witches in Nieuwpoort between 1602 and 1652. A memorial plaque commemorates the victims of the witch trials.
