= Reformed Political League =

Former political party in the Netherlands

Reformed Political League Gereformeerd Politiek Verbond
- Founded: 1948
- Dissolved: 2003
- Merged into: Christian Union
- Youth wing: Gereformeerd Politiek Jongeren Contact
- Membership (2000): 12,940
- Ideology: Christian democracy Social conservatism
- Political position: Centre-right
- Religion: Reformed Churches in the Netherlands (Liberated)
- European Parliament group: EDD

The Reformed Political League (Dutch: Gereformeerd Politiek Verbond, GPV) was an orthodox Protestant political party in the Netherlands founded in 1948. In 2003, the party was dissolved and merged into the Christian Union. The party was a testimonial party and had strong ties to the Reformed Churches in the Netherlands (Liberated).

== History ==
=== Founding and early history, 1948–1963 ===
The GPV was founded in 1948 as the result of a theological conflict within the Reformed Churches in the Netherlands, which led to the creation of the Reformed Churches in the Netherlands (Liberated). On 11 August 1944, a group of around 80,000–90,000 orthodox Protestants left the mainstream Reformed Church following the defrocking of Klaas Schilder, as a result of theological differences over whether baptism was valid for one's entire life or only as long as one believed, the covenant of grace and the authority of the central synod.

In 1948, adherents of the Reformed Church in the Netherlands (Liberated) left the Anti-Revolutionary Party, the party linked to the Reformed Church in the Netherlands, convinced that the 1944 schism made political cooperation with members of the mainstream Reformed Church impossible. On 1 April 1948, they officially founded the Provisional League of Reformed Electoral Associations (Voorlopig Verband van Gereformeerde Kiesverenigingen), renamed the League of Reformed Electoral Associations (Verbond van Gereformeerde Kiesverenigingen) during a congress in Amersfoort. Former ARP MP Albertus Zijlstra chaired the congress, and also led the party in its early years. Attempts at reconciliation with the ARP by the congress would fail, and in 1949 all contact with the ARP was cut off following its refusal to take sides in ecclesiastical matters. That same year, the party had its first successes in the 1949 local elections, winning 13 seats in total.

The party participated without success in the 1948, 1952 and 1956 general elections. On 11 April 1950, the party officially adopted the Gereformeerd Politiek Verbond name, after several local electoral associations had already adopted the name during the local elections the year prior. After the 1956 elections, the number of seats in parliament was increased from 100 to 150; as a consequence the minimum number of votes needed to obtain a seat decreased from one percent of the vote to two-thirds of one percent of the vote. In the 1959 general election it appeared that the GPV had finally won a seat. Its lead candidate, Bert Laning, was asked to visit Queen Juliana to advise her on the formation of a new cabinet. After the results were recalculated, however, it became clear that the GPV had missed out on a seat by just 24 votes, largely as a result of internal party conflicts weakening the party's popularity.

=== Electoral success, 1963–1989 ===
After the 1963 general election, the party finally entered the House of Representatives in the person of Piet Jongeling, the chief editor of the Nederlands Dagblad and a writer of children's books, who was made lead candidate on advice of prominent professor of theology Jaap Kamphuis. In the House, Jongeling quickly became a noted speaker, who spoke out in favor of political dualism, the right of small parties to exist and Christian moral values. Internationally, he supported the rights of Christian minorities in Indonesia and Apartheid in South Africa.

In the 1967 general election, they were able to retain their one seat. Whereas other Christian political parties were losing ground in an increasingly secular and depillarised country, the GPV was able to maintain its popularity by positioning itself as a bastion of conservative Christianity, with Jongeling in particular gaining popularity as a unwavering figure in opposition to the prevailing progressive zeitgeist.

During the early 1970s, a group called the Nationaal Evanglisch Verbond (NEV) had left the ARP because they opposed the party's alliance with the Catholic People's Party (KVP). They asked the board of the GPV whether they could join their party. This was rejected by the board of the GPV, who said that the party was open only to members of the liberated Reformed Church. This group would later become the Reformatory Political Federation (RPF). In the 1971 general election, the party was able to obtain a second seat, partially as a result of Jongeling's popularity among Reformed voters, which went to party ideologue Bart Verbrugh. The GPV managed to retain its second seat in 1972. In the 1977 general election, Jongeling was replaced by Verbrugh and the party lost one seat, the result of the uncharismatic Verbrugh's weakness as a public speaker as well as increased competition from the RPF and the newly united Christian Democratic Appeal (CDA). In contrast to the more constructive Jongeling, Verbrugh harshly criticised the government, especially focusing on opposition to abortion and the need for a strong defence.

Before the 1981 general election, Verbrugh was replaced by Gert Schutte, who would lead the party until 2001. Schutte was more of a pragmatic figure, who similar to Jongeling supported political dualism between the government and the House of Representatives. The party would shift to the left on economics, proposing a National Recovery and Development Plan (Nationaal Herstel- en Ontwikkelingsplan) in 1981 which proposed that the state do more to address unemployment. In 1985, the GPV, along with the SGP and RPF, was able to help the first Lubbers cabinet pass a motion to agree to the placement of American cruise missiles over the opposition of several CDA dissidents. He was able to retain the one seat in the 1981, 1982 and 1986 general elections. Prior to the 1986 general election, some even speculated that the GPV (along with the other smaller Christian parties) might provide confidence and support for the CDA–VVD coalition, or even enter government for the first time by itself.

=== Cooperation and merger, 1989–2003 ===
The GPV managed to win a second seat in 1989, which went to Eimert van Middelkoop. In 1993 the GPV officially opened itself to non-liberated members. This started a slow process of cooperation between the GPV and the RPF, another orthodox Protestant party. In the 1994 general election the party retained its two seats, but did not manage to profit from the decline of the CDA. In combination with the decline of religious tensions between different orthodox Reformed churches, this would gradually lead to a process whereby the two orthodox Protestant parties would grow closer together.

From the 1998 general election onwards, the two parliamentary parties began to cooperate, holding common meanings and appointing common spokespersons. The fact that the GPV had only two seats and the RPF three inhibited the cooperation. The GPV's stricter adherence to the Three Forms of Unity in its statutes as well as the more homogenous composition of the GPV as compared to the RPF further complicated matters. Yet throughout the 1990s support for further cooperation began to grow both among party prominents within the Groen van Prinsterer Foundation and figures like Bart Verbrugh as well as among ordinary party members. A 1998 poll showed 82% of GPV voters supporting a full merger.

In 1999, their parliamentary parties in the Senate officially merged, forming one parliamentary party. That same year, the two parties formally committed to a political union, running on a shared electoral list and platform in elections while leaving the possibility of a full merger open. On 22 January 2000, this union was formalised. In 2001, the two parliamentary groups in the House of Representatives merged as well. In the 2002 general election the GPV and RPF therefore presented a common electoral list of candidates for the House, entering the elections as the Christian Union: they obtained four seats. In 2003, the GPV officially disbanded, making its merger into the Christian Union final.

== Name ==
The GPV chose the name Gereformeerd Politiek Verbond (Reformed Political Alliance), because it wanted to convey that it was a reformed party, and that its organisation was decentralised: the GPV was primarily an alliance of local branches.

== Ideology and issues ==
The party was specifically linked to the liberated Reformed Church. Membership of the church was a pre-requisite for membership of the party. In its first years, the GPV did not have a separate election manifesto or manifesto of principles. Instead it claimed to base its policy directly on the Bible, claiming that a party program would only distract from its divine message. However, from the 1950s a coherent "National Reformed" ideology would begin to coalesce, with later party leader Bart Verbrugh as a guiding figure. Verbrugh thought that the Dutch constitution should be explicitly based on Christian principles, with a Supreme Court appointed by the monarch that could strike down any legislation inconsistent with those principles, but in contrast to the theocratic SGP would still allow non-Protestants freedom of worship. In accordance with the Calvinist cultural mandate, he also proposed further cultivation and development of the Dutch landscape, and the colonization of Dutch Suriname and New Guinea with ethnically homogenous Dutch families to "protect Dutch culture" and civilise the native population.

In 1966, the party would formally adopt Verbrugh's National Reformed ideology as its own and publish its first manifesto of principles, in which the party again stressed that the Bible was the basis of their policy. The party saw the Netherlands as a Protestant nation, which should be defended. Verbrugh's ideology would dominate the GPV until the 1980s, and its influence lasted until the formation of the Christian Union in 2000.

In practice, this meant that the GPV took the following stances:

- The GPV was against European integration, because it distrusted the Catholic nature of the project;
- The party was in favour of a strong defense;
- The GPV was staunchly monarchist because it saw the Dutch monarchy as a God-given institution;
- The party wanted the government to decrease its influence on society, allowing for private initiative and civil society to take over some of its functions; during the 1980s the party wanted to retain the welfare state and paid attention to the environment;
- The GPV defended the system of special schools, which allowed for schools to be founded on liberated reformed principles;
- The party favoured the independence of South Maluku and Irian Jaya, and supported Apartheid in South Africa until the early 1980s.
- As a socially conservative orthodox Protestant party, the party was against the Dutch policy on soft drugs, same-sex marriage, prostitution, abortion and euthanasia.

In the 1980s, under the more pragmatic Gert Schutte, the party shifted in a more moderate direction, being the most moderate of the three minor orthodox Protestant parties in that decade. While still openly professing the need for a Christian state, the GPV would dedicate its attention increasingly towards issues such as promoting the interests of the weak in society and protecting the environment, while some members criticised the party's opposition to European integration and argued against Verbrugh's notion of a Christian state. In the 1990s it even softened its position on marriage, arguing for legal recognition of cohabitation and same-sex couples while still opposing equal same-sex marriage, which would lead to tensions with the more socially conservative RPF.

== Election results ==
=== House of Representatives ===
Election	Lead candidate	List	Votes		Seats	Ref.
Election	Lead candidate	List	No.	%	Seats	Ref.
1952	Albertus Zijlstra	List	35,497	0.67	0 / 100	
1956	L.P. Laning	List	37,206	0.65	0 / 150	
1959	L.P. Laning	List	39,972	0.67	0 / 150	
1963	Piet Jongeling	List	46,324	0.74	1 / 150	
1967	Piet Jongeling	List	59,218	0.86	1 / 150	
1971	Piet Jongeling	List	101,797	1.61	2 / 150	
1972	Piet Jongeling	List	131,236	1.77	2 / 150	
1977	Bart Verbrugh	List	79,421	0.95	1 / 150	
1981	Gert Schutte	List	70,878	0.82	1 / 150	
1982	Gert Schutte	List	67,163	0.82	1 / 150	
1986	Gert Schutte	List	88,381	0.96	1 / 150	
1989	Gert Schutte	List	109,458	1.23	2 / 150	
1994	Gert Schutte	List	119,158	1.33	2 / 150	
1998	Gert Schutte	List	108,724	1.26	2 / 150	

== Representatives ==
=== Members of the House of Representatives ===
Name	Start	End	Ref.
Piet Jongeling	5 June 1963	7 June 1977	
Eimert van Middelkoop	14 September 1989	12 March 2001 (Note: Continued as member of Christian Union)	
Gert Schutte	10 June 1981	13 February 2001	
Arie Slob	14 February 2001	12 March 2001	
Bart Verbrugh	11 May 1971	9 June 1981	

=== Senators ===
Name	Start	End	Ref.
Cees van Bruchem	8 June 1999	26 March 2001	
Egbert Schuurman	13 September 1983	26 March 2001	

== Electorate ==
The GPV's electorate was almost entirely made up out of members of the Reformed Churches in the Netherlands (Liberated). These were concentrated in Gelderland, Utrecht and South Holland, which form part of the Dutch Bible belt, and Groningen.

== Organisation ==
=== Organisational structure ===
The GPV's organisation was modeled on that of the Reformed Church (Liberated). As such, the party did not have individual members, but was composed of relatively autonomous local Reformed electoral associations which freely associated with the party, and could largely determine their own regulations. These associations could only be expelled from the party by a national congress of party members. The party was initially headed by an Association Council (Verbondsraad), which was tasked with maintaining contact between the different local electoral associations. After repeated internal conflicts in the early 1950s, the Association Council was split into two parts. The first was the Central Association Council (Centrale Verbondsraad; CVR), responsible for the day-to-day management of the party, and the second General Association Council (Generale Verbondsraad; GVR), consisting of the members of the CVR and two representatives for every Provincial Contact Council (Provinciale Contactraad; PCR). The GVR met yearly and selected candidates for elections to the House of Representatives.

In practice however, the relative power of the two councils differed by period. In the 1950s, the CVR made most important decisions which were rubber stamped by the GVR, but when the CVR started opening up to non-Liberated Reformed groups from the 1960s onward the GVR took more of a leading role, blocking all efforts at cooperation with the RPF and SGP up to the 1980s.

The party secretariat was located in Dordrecht and later in Amersfoort.

=== Linked organisations ===
The party published Ons Politeuma ("Our Citizenship"). Its scientific institute was the Groen van Prinsterer Stichting ("Groen van Prinsterer Foundation") and its education institute was Mandaat - Gereformeerd Politiek Vormingswerk ("Mandate, Reformed Political Education work"). Its youth organisation was the Gereformeerde Politieke Jongeren Club ("Reformed Political Youth Club"), which published Plein ("Square") and Stand-By.

=== Pillarised organisations ===
The party was part of a small liberated Reformed pillar, consisting of like-minded organisations. Most prominent was the Reformed Churches in the Netherlands (Liberated), with which the party was largely synonymous for most of its existence. The paper Nederlands Dagblad was closely linked to the GPV, Pieter Jongeling, who also led the parliamentary party from 1963 to 1977, led the paper until 1974. The Kampen Theological University of the Reformed Church (Liberated) was also linked to the liberated Reformed Church.

=== Relationships to other parties ===
Before 1981, the party was very isolated, which was caused by their own dogmatic position on non-liberated Reformed Christians. Nonetheless the knowledge and conscience of its MPs was respected throughout parliament.

After 1981, the party began to cooperate with more with other parties, especially with the orthodox Protestant Political Reformed Party (SGP) and Reformatory Political Federation (RPF). In 1981, the GPV allowed municipal branches to cooperate with branches of other parties, this led to the formation of several combined lists with either the SGP or RPF or both. In 1984, the party entered in the European elections with a combined list alongside the RPF and SGP. It won only one seat. In 1994. they were more successful and won two seats, one of which was taken by the GPV.

In 1993, the party allowed non-liberated Reformed protestants to become member of the party, which started a slow cooperation process with the RPF and ultimately resulted in the fusion in the Christian Union in 2003.

== International comparison ==
Internationally the party was comparable to the American Christian Right and the small Protestant parties of Scandinavia, such as the Christian Democratic Party of Norway, the Swedish and Danish Christian Democrats. In the European Parliament, the GPV was a member of the Eurosceptic Europe of Democracies and Diversities political group, along with the RPF and SGP.

== Literature ==
- Klei, Ewout (2011). 'Klein maar krachtig, dat maakt ons uniek'. Een geschiedenis van het GPV, 1948-2003. Amsterdam: Bert Bakker. ISBN 978-90-351-3609-0.
