= Luc Sala =

Dutch entrepreneur and writer (1949–2023)

- Born: Lucius Hendrikus Dominicus Josephus Sala; 13 December 1949; Leiden, Netherlands
- Died: 14 April 2023 (aged 73); Zutphen
- Occupation(s): Businessman and writer

Lucius Hendrikus Dominicus Josephus Sala (13 December 1949 – 14 April 2023) was a Dutch businessman and writer.

== Career ==
Sala graduated as a physics drs (Ir.n.i.) in 1976, at the Delft University of Technology. He graduated in economics at the Erasmus University Rotterdam. He worked for Fasson, Bruynzeel and Philips, but in 1982, he founded the media company Sala Communications.

With his own company Sala began the publication of various computer magazines in the early years of the personal computer, amongst others Commodore-Info and Dealer-Info. He also wrote various books and organized computer fairs such as Commodore-Info, the PC Dumpdag and the PC Infodag. In 1987, Sala began the computer shop BCE, originally as a trade point for second-hand hardware. In the 1990s, BCE became a chain store for PC's and hardware.

After his computer period Sala mainly occupied himself with New Age and spirituality. He was in contact with amongst others Timothy Leary, Terence McKenna, Jaron Lanier and John Perry Barlow.

In 1999, Sala entered politics, taking part in the European Parliament elections with his Lijst Sala, struggling against corruption. He was campaign leader for the party Duurzaam Nederland and third on the candidate list. These initiatives failed to gain substantial support.

Leading up to the year 2000, Sala repeatedly warned about the millennium bug and its possible consequences. Since 2003, he was active as a columnist for a free Amsterdam newspaper.

Sala sold his computer store to an employee in 2008.

Sala died on 14 April 2023, at the age of 73.

== Bibliography ==
- De media revolutie, ARA / 1982
- Thuiscomputers, Bakker, 1983, ISBN 90-6019-946-4
- Alles over videospelletjes : wegwijs in de wereld van de videogames : tips voor de aanschaf : win van de computer : ook educatieve spelletjes, Luitingh, 1983, ISBN 90-245-0809-6
- Van start met de C-16 in Basic 3.5, with Olaf Simoné (pseudonym of O. Schrickel), SAC, 1984
- Het grote listingboek van Commodore-info, with Jan Bodzinga & Rob van den Heuvel, Sala Communications / Commodore-info, 1985, ISBN 90-940049-4-1
- PC starter : informatief handboek voor de beginnende computergebruiker, with Chris Bergman, Sala Communications, 1990, ISBN 90-240-0723-2
- PC gebruiker : informatief handboek voor de ervaren computergebruiker, Sala Communications / 1991, ISBN 90-240-0727-5
- Virtual Reality : de metafysische kermisattractie : magische spiegel van de Hyper-Cyber-Age ziel, with John P. Barlow, William Bricken & Maaike Manten, Sala Communications / 1990, ISBN 90-73107-02-4
- Het Internet Opstapboekje, Luc Sala, Sala Communications, 1996, ISBN 90-73107-06-7
- Paddo's - Onze kleine broeders - Starter voor magic mushroom psychonauten, with Arno Adelaars and with the help of Kyra Kuitert and Joost Janssen, Egosoft/L.Sala, 1997, English translation: Magic Mushrooms - Our little brothers - Starter for Magic Mushroom Psychonauts, ISBN 90-803696-2-4
- Bit bang: in de schaduw van het millennium : de dreiging van de millennium bug, tips en maatregelen om de problemen het hoofd te bieden, with the help of Oussama Cherribi & Ronald Wouterson, MySTèr Millennium Project, 1998, ISBN 90-73107-08-3
- RSI: muis én multisyndroom, with Laura Egging, Sala Communications, 2004, ISBN 90-73107-10-5
- Ritual: the magical perspective. Efficacy and the search for inner meaning New Delhi: Nirala, 2014, ISBN 9788182500600 and 8182500605
- De verbonden stad: essays over de stedelijke omgeving in de context van diversiteit en mobiliteit, met als motto: doorbloeding, met Luud Schimmelpennink et al., Hilversum: Mindlift Publishers, 2015
- De Innerlijke Reis; Tripgids voor psychonauten 2017 Uitg. ArtScience, ISBN 9789492079152
- Nota Lokale Media Amsterdam; een kritische en onafhankelijke visie op de rol en betekenis van communicatie binnen de stad Amsterdam, Luc Sala (redactie) met Simcha de Haan, Martijn Suurenbroek, Kimbel Bouwman en Ludwich van Mulier. ISBN 9789492079336 uitgever: Artscience. 2019
- Festivalization, the boom in events; How festivals and autonomous zones offer an escape from the cyberspaced contact prison. How to understand participation, identification, and transformation as the core parameters of a new industry. {{ISBN }9789492079107}} (2015)
- Sacred Journeys, tripguide for psychonauts; About travelling inside with psychedelics in a ritual context. ISBN 9789492079091 (2017)
- Identity, the essence of manifestation; A study on identity in psychology with prof.Stanley Krippner, Steve Speer, John Newton, Denice Leverett and Steve Speer, Uitg. ArtSccience ISBN 9789072475480 (2017)
- Identity 2.0, the dance of our substitute identities and the illusion of digital identity; A 520-page perspective (update from Identity) with prof. Stanley Krippner, Steve Speer & Denice Leverett. Uitg. Artscience ISBN 9789492079350 (2019)
- Typology in a multiple substitute identity perspective, A critical view on psychological profiling and typing, ISBN 9789492079480 (2021)
- PTSD and Identity Conflict; Trauma-immunity and new perspectives on dealing with dissociation and trauma (2021)
