= Marc de Vries =

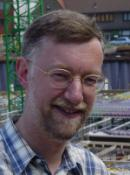
- Born: 1958 (age 66–67); Haarlem, Netherlands
- Education: Free University Amsterdam (M.Sc.); Eindhoven University of Technology (Ph.D.)
- Occupation: Professor

M.J. (Marc) de Vries (born 1958), is professor of Reformational Philosophy at the Delft University of Technology.

== Biography ==
Marc de Vries studied physics at the Free University of Amsterdam (the Netherlands) and graduated in 1982 on the subject: dissolving problems in physical education. In 1988 he got his promotion at the Eindhoven University of Technology on the subject: technology in physical education.

He was a teacher in Physics at a school in Papendrecht (1982-1983). In 1983-1984 he was a teacher in Physics, Mathematics and Didactics at the Institute for Teacher Education, Eindhoven University of Pedagogical Technology (PTH). Thereafter, 1984–1988, he was as researcher in Physics and Technology education allied to the Eindhoven University of Technology. In 1988 he was guest researcher at the Virginia Polytechnic Institute and State University, Technology Education Programme. In 1988-1991 he was head of the Technology Education department (teachers' educations program) at the Eindhoven University of Pedagogical Technology. In 1990 he began as an assistant professor in Philosophy and methodology of technology (now: Philosophy and ethics of technology) at the Eindhoven University of Technology (chair of Prof. Dr.ir. Anthonie Meijers).

M.J. de Vries is currently professor of Reformational Philosophy at the Delft University of Technology and thereby succeeded Prof.Dr. Egbert Schuurman of the Association for Reformational Philosophy. He is currently the editor in chief of The International Journal for Technology and Design Education.

In Januari 2019, he approved the Nashville Statement. This led to demands from action group TU Delft Feminist that he be fired. De Vries apologized in February, clarifying that he had not signed the statement, but approved it "in the context of a discussion that was taking place in the Church among Christians".

== Selected publications ==
- Vries, M.J. de (2005). Analyzing the complexity of nanotechnology. Techné: Research in Philosophy and Technology, 8–3, 62-75
- Vries, M.J. de (2005). The nature of technological knowledge: philosophical reflections and educational consequences. International Journal of Technology and Design Education, 15, 149-154
- Vries, M.J. de (2004). Nieuwe Delftse bijdragen aan een reformatorische techniekfilosofie. Beweging, 68–1, 24-27
- Broens, C.J.A.M., Vries, M.J. de (2003). Classifying technological knowledge for presentation to mechanical engineering designers. Design Studies, 24, 457-471
- Vries, M.J. de (2003). De aard van technische kennis: algemene onderzoeksvragen en de gevalstudie 'LOCOS' Filosofie, 12–6, 37-39
- Vries, M.J. de (2003). Design matters, and so does philosophy of design. Journal of Design & Technology Education, 8–3, 150-153
- Vries, M.J. de (2003). Filosofische reflecties op de aard van technische kennis. Kort verslag van een internationale conferentie. Filosofie, 13–4, 41-43
- Vries, M.J. de (2003). Toward an empirically informed epistemology of technology. Techné: Research in Philosophy and Technology, 6–3, 1-21
