= Nederlands Dagblad =

Dutch newspaper

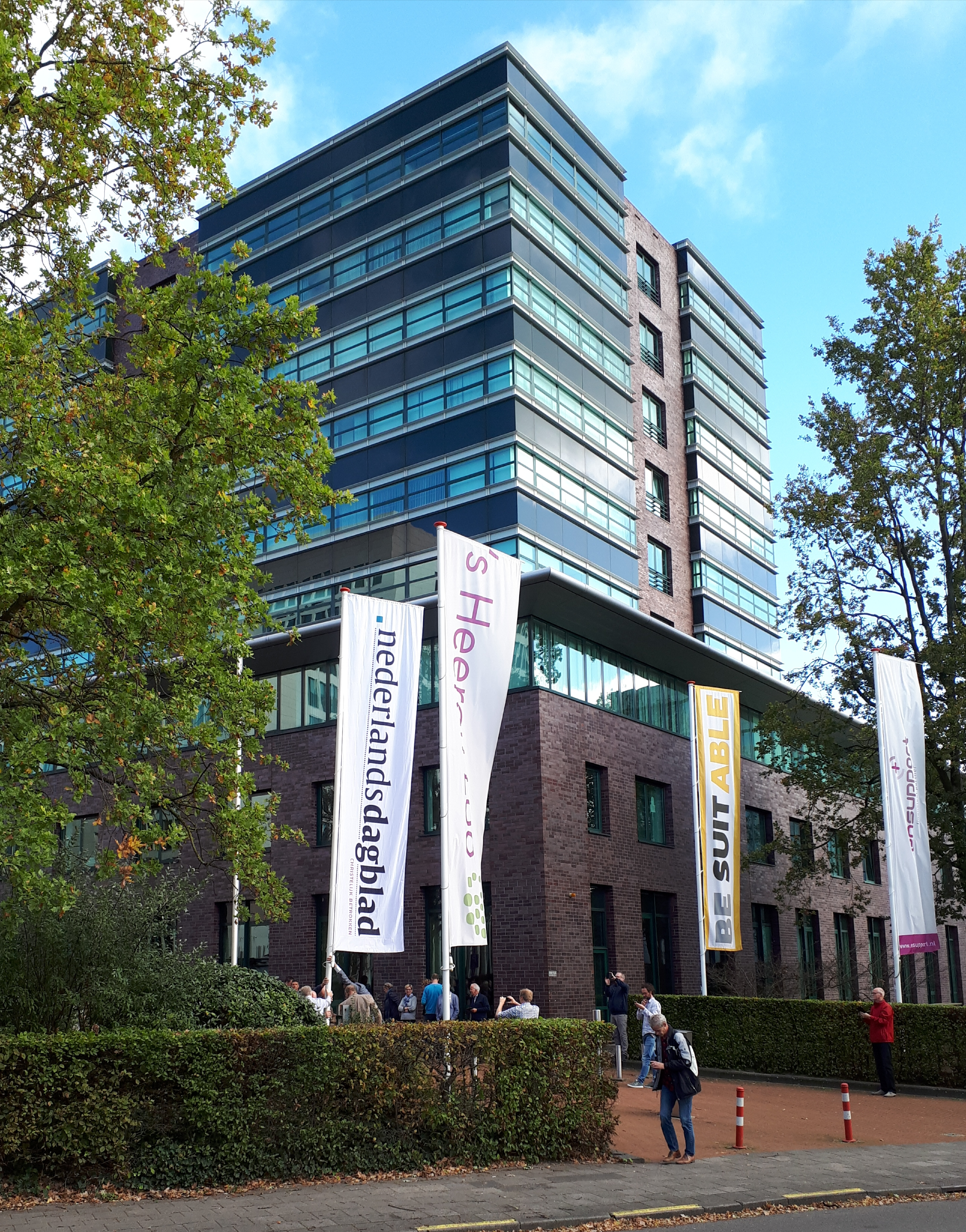
- Business complex in Amersfoort, housing the Nederlands Dagblad headquarters
- Type: Daily newspaper
- Format: Tabloid
- Editor-in-chief: Nico de Fijter
- Political alignment: Christian
- Language: Dutch
- Country: Netherlands
- Circulation: 23.000 (2020)
- Website: nd.nl
- Free online archives: No

Nederlands Dagblad (Dutch pronunciation: [ˈneːdərlɑnts ˈdɑɣblɑt]; "Dutch Daily") is a Dutch daily newspaper, available nationwide, with a daily circulation of 23,800 issues (in 2020).

== History ==
The paper was founded in 1944 as a semi-resistance paper during World War II called Reformatie Stemmen (Reformatory Voices). After the war it was renamed De Vrije Kerk (The Free Church) and later Gereformeerd gezinsblad (Reformed Family Paper). In 1959 it became a daily newspaper. The paper obtained its current name in 1967. For many years it had a strong binding with the Reformed Churches in the Netherlands (Liberated) and the Gereformeerd Politiek Verbond, a former Dutch christian political party. In recent years, it attempts to offer a broader perspective on contemporary issues from a Christian point of view. The office is located in Amersfoort.

== Circulation ==
On its top the circulation was about 32,000 in 2000. In 2020 the circulation is 23,800. Nederlands Dagblad reaches daily about 100,000 people (13+). The website, www.nd.nl, has monthly 470,000 unique visitors. Since 2011 most articles on the website are behind a pay wall.

== Chief editors ==
- 1948: Piet Jongeling
- 1974: Jurn de Vries
- 1994: Peter Bergwerff
- 2013: Sjirk Kuijper
- 2022: Nico de Fijter

== Trivia ==
In 2010 the size went from broadsheet (597 mm x 749 mm) to berliner (315 mm x 470 mm). Since 2015 the size is tabloid (279 mm x 432 mm) like most Dutch newspapers.

The typeface Gulliver, created in 1992 by Gerard Unger, is the main typeface used in Nederlands Dagblad.
