= Piet Jongeling =

Dutch politician (1909–1985)

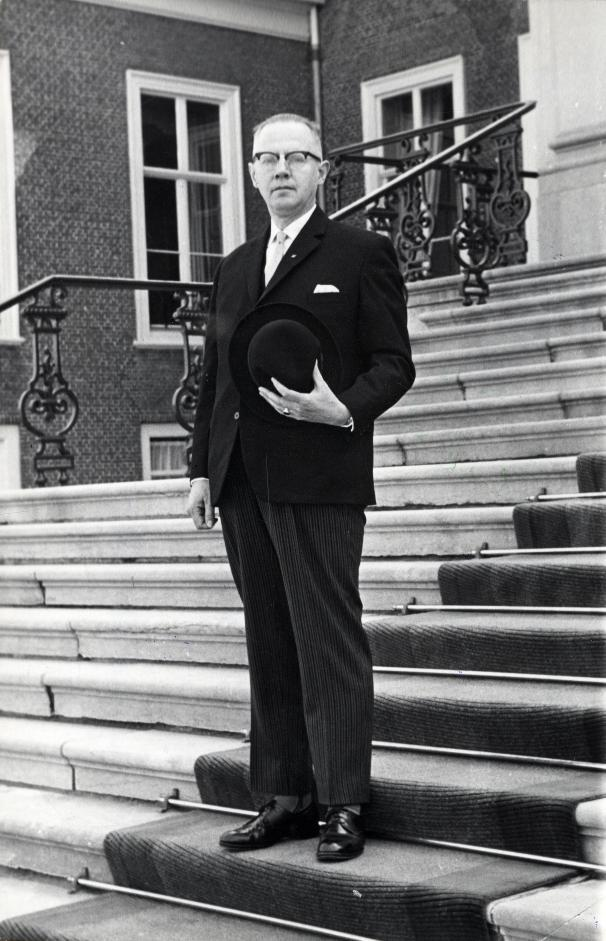
Piet Jongeling

Pieter "Piet" Jongeling (31 March 1909 in Broeksterwâld - 26 August 1985 in Amersfoort), also known by the pen name Piet Prins, was a Dutch politician and author of children's books. He was a member of the Reformed Political League (GPV) and of the House of Representatives of the Netherlands.

== Journalism ==
Jongeling worked as a journalist for the anti-revolutionary newspaper Nieuwe Provinciale Groninger Courant. In 1941, during the German occupation, the publication was banned, and in 1942, Jongeling was sent to the Amersfoort concentration camp, later being transferred to Sachsenhausen. After the war, Jongeling became editor of Nieuwe Provinciale Groninger Courant, but later left to become editor of De Vrije Kerk.

== Politics ==
Jongeling was a member of the Anti-Revolutionary Party, but left when the Reformed Political League (GPV) split off from the ARP. The GPV was associated with the Reformed Churches in the Netherlands (Liberated), which had formed in 1944. Jongeling was elected to the House of Representatives in 1963, and served until 1977 as leader of the GPV.

As a member of the House of Representatives, Jongeling was an advocate for the rights of Papuans and Moluccans in the newly independent Indonesia. He was a staunch supporter of the Dutch monarchy, the separation of powers and responsibilities between the government and the House of Representatives, as well as the right of small political parties to exist. He opposed the cultural changes of the 1960s and 1970s, vigorously opposing the legalization of abortion, changes in views on sexuality and secularisation in general. In foreign politics, he was an anti-communist, loyal to NATO, and was sympathetic to Apartheid in South Africa.

== Children's books ==
Jongeling wrote a number of children's books under the pen name "Piet Prins". Most famous among there are the Scout series (Snuf in the original Dutch). Other series include The Four Adventurers and Wambu.

The books have been translated into English. by Harry der Nederlanden or James C. van Oosterom. The books were frequently illustrated by Jaap Kramer.

Scout Series

- (1) Scout: The Secret of the Swamp
- (2) Scout: The Haunted Castle
- (3) Scout: The Flying Phantom
- (4) Scout: The Sailing Sleuths
- (5) Scout: The Treasure of Rodensteyn Castle
- (6) Scout: The Mystery of the Abandoned Mill
- (7) Scout's Distant Journey

Shadow Series

- (1) The Lonely Sentinel
- (2) Hideout in the Swamp
- (3) The Grim Reaper
- (4) The Partisans
- (5) Sabotage

Sheltie Series

- (1) The Curse of Urumbu
- (2) The Search for Sheltie

Struggle Series

- (1) When the Morning Came
- (2) Dispelling the Tyranny
- (3) The Beggars' Victory
- (4) For the Heart of Holland

The Four Adventurers Series

- The Four Adventurers Meet the Evil Professor
- The Mystery of the Three-Fingered Villain

Wambu Series

- (1) The Chieftain's Son
- (2) In the Valley of Death
- (3) Journey to Manhood

Other books:

- Rob and Roland
- Rob and Roland on the Farm
- Anak, the Eskimo Boy
- Run, Kevin, Run!
- Zarco, the Explorer
- Stefan Derksen's Polar Adventure

.Daan En Sietze Duiken Onder .Daan en Sietze Helpen Het verzetsgroep .Daan en sietze Vechten Voor De Vrijheid
