= Gert Schutte =

Dutch politician (1939–2022)

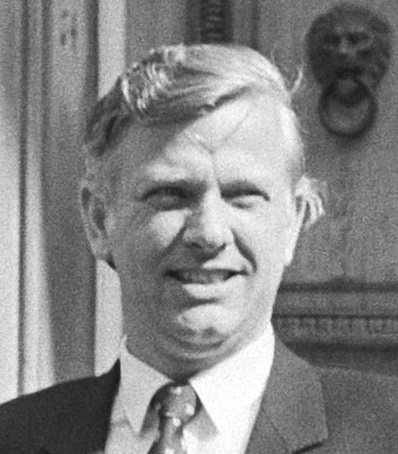
- Schutte in 1982

Leader of the Reformed Political League
- In office 10 June 1981 – 13 February 2001
- Preceded by: Bart Verbrugh
- Succeeded by: Eimert van Middelkoop

Leader of the Reformed Political League in the House of Representatives
- In office 10 June 1981 – 13 February 2001
- Preceded by: Bart Verbrugh
- Succeeded by: Eimert van Middelkoop

Member of the House of Representatives
- In office 10 June 1981 – 13 February 2001

Personal details
- Born: Gerrit Jan Schutte; 24 May 1939 Nieuwpoort, Netherlands
- Died: 25 January 2022 (aged 82)
- Party: Christian Union (from 2002)
- Other political affiliations: Reformed Political League (1973–2002)
- Occupation: Politician · Civil servant · Teacher · Author · Columnist

Gerrit Jan Schutte (24 May 1939 – 25 January 2022) was a Dutch politician and teacher. He was the party leader of the now defunct Reformed Political League (GPV), which later merged into the Christian Union (CU), from 1981 to 2001.

== Early life ==
After finishing high school in 1956 Schutte started working as a civil servant for the municipality of Giessenburg. He would work in the same function for the municipalities of Schoonhoven, Elst en Nieuwpoort. In 1968 until 1981 he was deputy secretary, the second highest civil servant, of the municipality of Zeist. In the same years he followed a number of educations specializing in governing in local governments. From 1969 until 1974 he also taught Law for Municipalities.

== Politics ==
From 1974 until 1978 Schutte became a member of the Provincial Council of Utrecht for the Reformed Political League. In 1981 he was elected in the Dutch House of Representatives. He was the only representative of his party and, because of that, parliamentary leader. In 1989 the party did get a second seat in Parliament and until his resignation in 2001 he worked together with Eimert van Middelkoop. In these years Schutte would become renowned as the "Constitutional law conscience of the Parliament". He felt that other politicians did not pay enough attention to the Constitutional laws.

== Later life and death ==
After his resignation, Schutte served as a member of the Select Board. He also investigated fraud of a number of Dutch institutions of higher education and was a member of the committee which was involved in preparing the Treaty establishing a Constitution for Europe.

Schutte was a columnist of the Friesch Dagblad and the Persunie. He was the father of six children and was a member of the Reformed Churches in the Netherlands (Liberated). He died after a short illness on 25 January 2022, at the age of 82.

== Decorations ==
Honours
| Ribbon bar | Honour | Country | Date | Comment |
|---|---|---|---|---|
| | Knight of the Order of Orange-Nassau | Netherlands | 30 April 1997 | |
| | Knight of the Order of the Netherlands Lion | Netherlands | 13 February 2001 | |

Party political offices
| Preceded by Bart Verbrugh; 1977 | Lead candidate of the Reformed Political League; 1981, 1982, 1986, 1989, 1994, 1998 | Party merged into the Christian Union |
Party political offices
| Preceded by Bart Verbrugh | Leader of the Reformed; Political League; 1981–2001 | Succeeded by Eimert van Middelkoop |
| Preceded by Bart Verbrugh | Parliamentary leader of the Reformed Political League in the House of Representatives; 1981–2001 | Succeeded by Eimert van Middelkoop |
