= Jurn de Vries =

Dutch politician, theologian and journalist

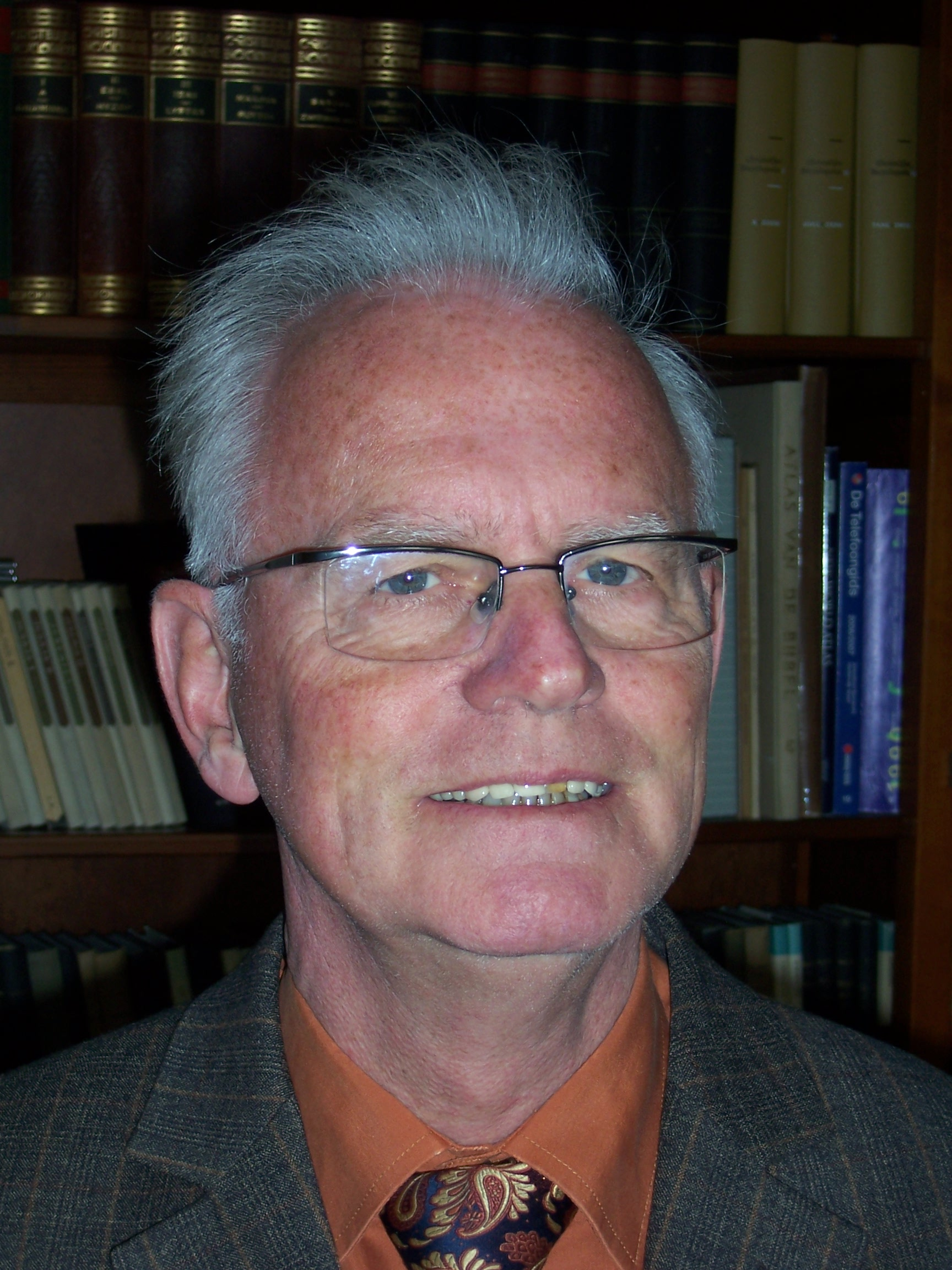
Jurn de Vries

Jurjen Pieter "Jurn" de Vries (born February 1, 1940, in Vrouwenpolder) is a Dutch theologian and former politician and journalist.

De Vries was a member of the Senate from 1999 to 2003 and in 2007 for the Reformed Political League and the ChristianUnion, respectively. He was also a member of the municipal council of Amersfoort.

From 1974 to 2001, he was editor-in-chief of the Nederlands Dagblad, a Reformed newspaper.

He studied theology at the Theological University of the Reformed Churches and is a member of the Reformed Churches in the Netherlands (Liberated).
