= Oussama Cherribi =

Moroccan-Dutch sociologist and former politician for the right-of-centre VVD party

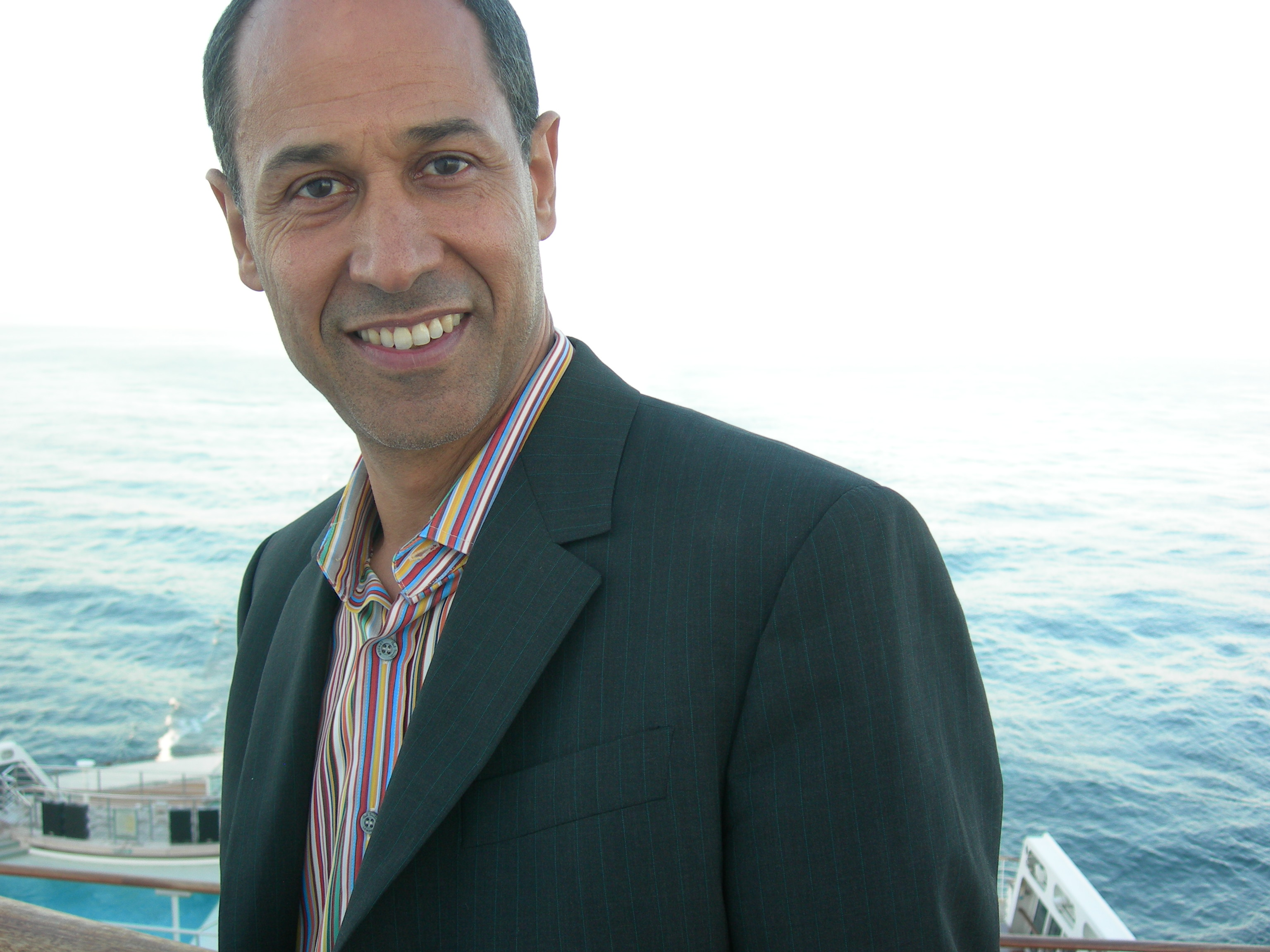
Sam Cherribi

Dr. Oussama (Sam) Cherribi is a Moroccan-Dutch sociologist, former politician for The People's Party for Freedom and Democracy (VVD) party, and current professor at Emory University. He was a member of the Dutch House of Representatives from 1994 to 2002.

Cherribi is often interviewed by news organizations on developments in European and Middle East and North African (MENA) regions, and is an often-invited public speaker.

== Early life and education ==
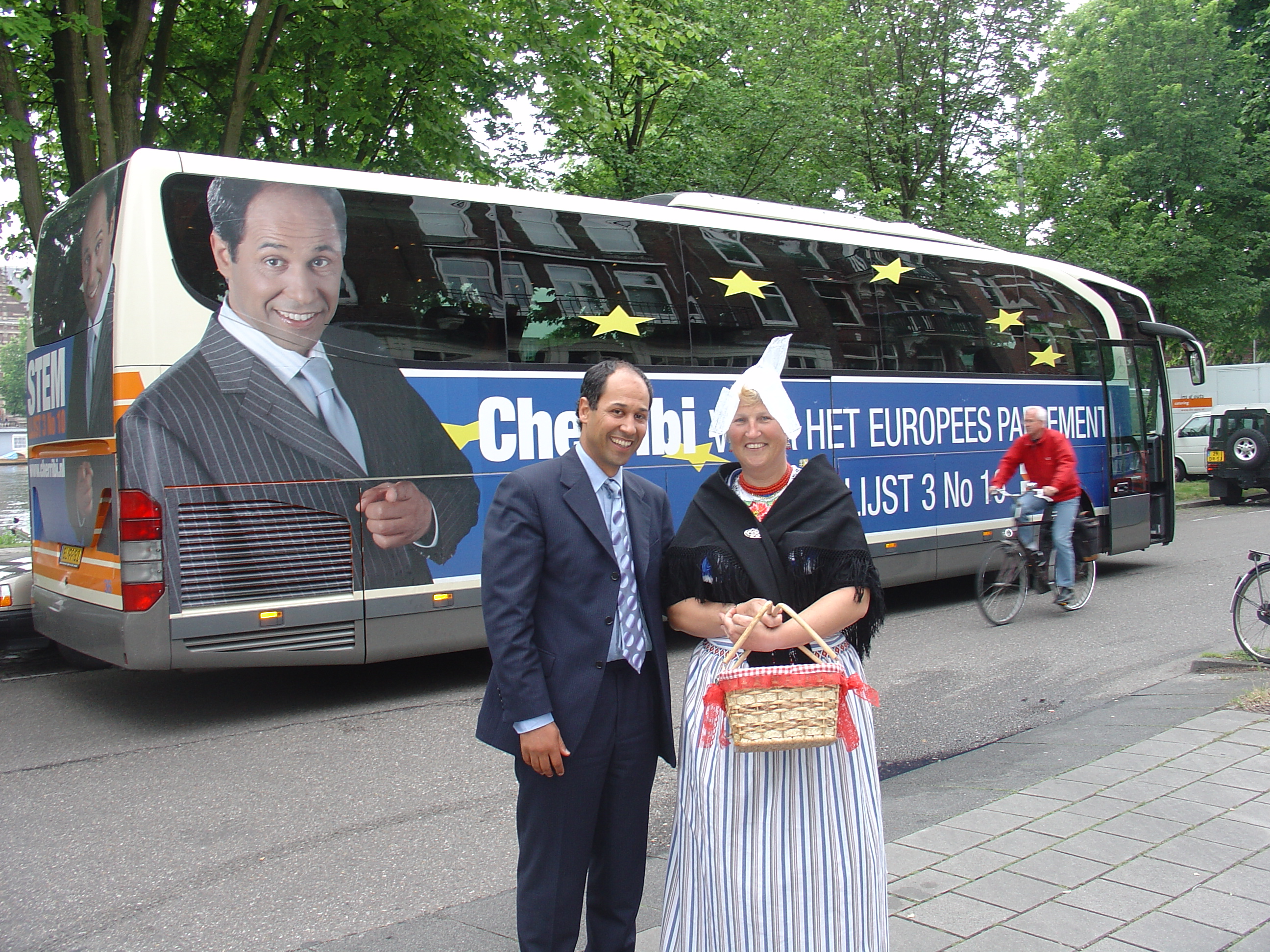
Bus supporting Cherribi for re-election

Cherribi was born 4 September 1959 in Kenitra, Morocco.

Cherribi studied literature in his town of birth and philosophy and sociology at the University of Rabat, sociology at the University of Nancy in France and, from 1983 onwards, philosophy and sociology at the University of Amsterdam.

After graduating in 1991, Cherribi entered a joint Ph.D. program at the Amsterdam School of Social Science Research at the University of Amsterdam & Leiden University. In 2000, while in office as a Member of the Dutch Parliament, he received his PhD in the social sciences. Cherribi also worked as a broadcaster and translator at the Dutch Public Service Television, NOS and, Dutch World Service from 1985 to 1990.

== Parliament and legislation ==
Cherribi served in the Dutch Parliament from 1994 until 2002. Throughout his tenure in parliament, Cherribi was a member of VVD, which belonged to The Group of the European Liberal Democrat and Reform Party, and likewise the Purple (Paars) government coalition of social democrats and liberals. Throughout his career as a Member of the Dutch Parliament (MP), Cherribi served on the Standing Committees of Foreign Affairs, Technology, Youth, Interior Affairs, Education, Welfare and Health. Furthermore, from 1995 until 2002, Cherribi was elected to represent the Netherlands in the Assembly of the Council of Europe.

As a member of the Standing Committee on Higher Education, Cherribi introduced legislation on comprehensive cultural training for imams in the Netherlands and Europe. A part of the Duplex Ordo program, this legislation encouraged imams living in the Netherlands to become educated on secular topics in order to facilitate positive relations between the Muslim community and Dutch society at-large.

As a European Council member representing the Netherlands, Cherribi played a crucial role in the Budapest Convention on Cybercrime. Cherribi drafted and proposed much of the legislation, including additions regarding "Internet Domain Names," that was ratified in November 2001. The Budapest Convention, which was consequently ratified by the United States Congress in 2006, sets precedent for future cybercrime laws until today.

In 1995, in an effort to bring politics to the people, Cherribi founded Den Haag-Online, a Dutch-language discussion board that allowed citizens to communicate with Members of Parliament via cyberspace. The goal of this project was to promote transparency and accountability in the Dutch government. This project was one of the nascent internet's first social media outlets.

Cherribi successfully campaigned for the former Dutch-speaking colonies of Suriname and South Africa to be accepted into the Belgian-Dutch Language Union Taalunie. Cherribi undertook this effort in order to promote the global use of Dutch in the age of the Internet.

In December 1998 and November 2001, Cherribi joined Dutch delegation as an Official Observer at the New York UN General Assembly, participating in committee meetings, deliberations, and meetings with other delegations.

Cherribi served as a member of the now-defunct Assembly of the West European Union, serving on numerous high-budget social and security-related committees.

In April, 2002, Dr. Cherribi served as the Rapporteur and Moderator for the Council of Europe Conference on Cultural Cooperation between Europe and North Africa. The Conference was held in the debating chambers of the Moroccan Parliament, in Rabat. This event, put on by the Council of Europe in Morocco, discussed further collaboration between the two governments.

As a Dutch MP, Cherribi hosted and moderated numerous other panels and conferences, both within the EU (North South Center) and abroad. Many of these conferences were centered around international development and education for MPs of developing nations.

Cherribi organized the African Diaspora Roundtable at the US Congress in 2017.

== Civil society ==
Cherribi was a Member of the board of directors for the Amsterdam Art Council for over 10 years and was the organization's only immigrant board member. He was also placed in charge of Migrant TV (MTV) from 1990 to 1993.

Cherribi created the Special Chair of Islam Foundation at the University of Amsterdam (UvA) for philosopher Mohammad Arkoun. This position was created in order to promote liberal Islam in the Netherlands, however UvA failed to properly subsidize the program. While there was already a chair position at UvA designated for the study of Islam, Cherribi noted that Arkoun's position was dedicated to the Moroccan and Turkish expatriate communities in the Netherlands and the study of Islam in Europe.

Cherribi served as a member of the Mohammed Arkoun Award Committee, a part of the Mohammed Arkoun Foundation for Peace and Dialogue between Cultures. This foundation is dedicated to popularizing and disseminating the works of Mohammad Arkoun, and promoting the study of Islam in Europe and North Africa—one of Cherribi's primary fields of study.

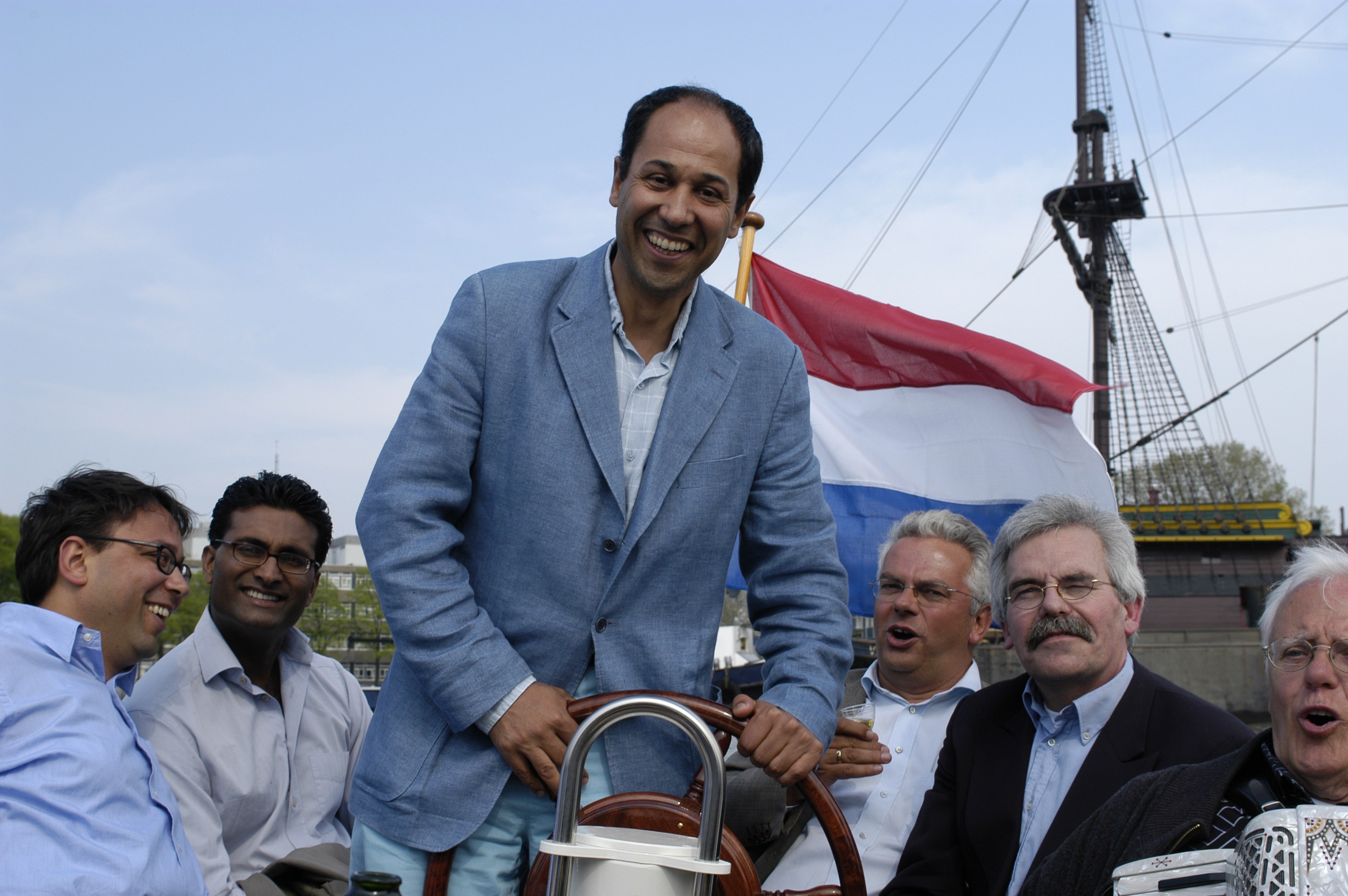
Cherribi (2004)

Along with Pierre Bourdieu, Cherribi spearheaded the establishment of network of solidarity cities, or villes refuge, throughout Europe. As a response to the Rushdie Affair, participating cities were to cooperate in assisting and welcoming persecuted writers from around the world into Europe, in order to promote free thought. According to its mission, the cities’ "priority task today is to respond to censorship by creating new areas of freedom, exchange and solidarity" for at-risk writers and thinkers. Berlin, Helsinki, and Vienna are all member cities of this project.

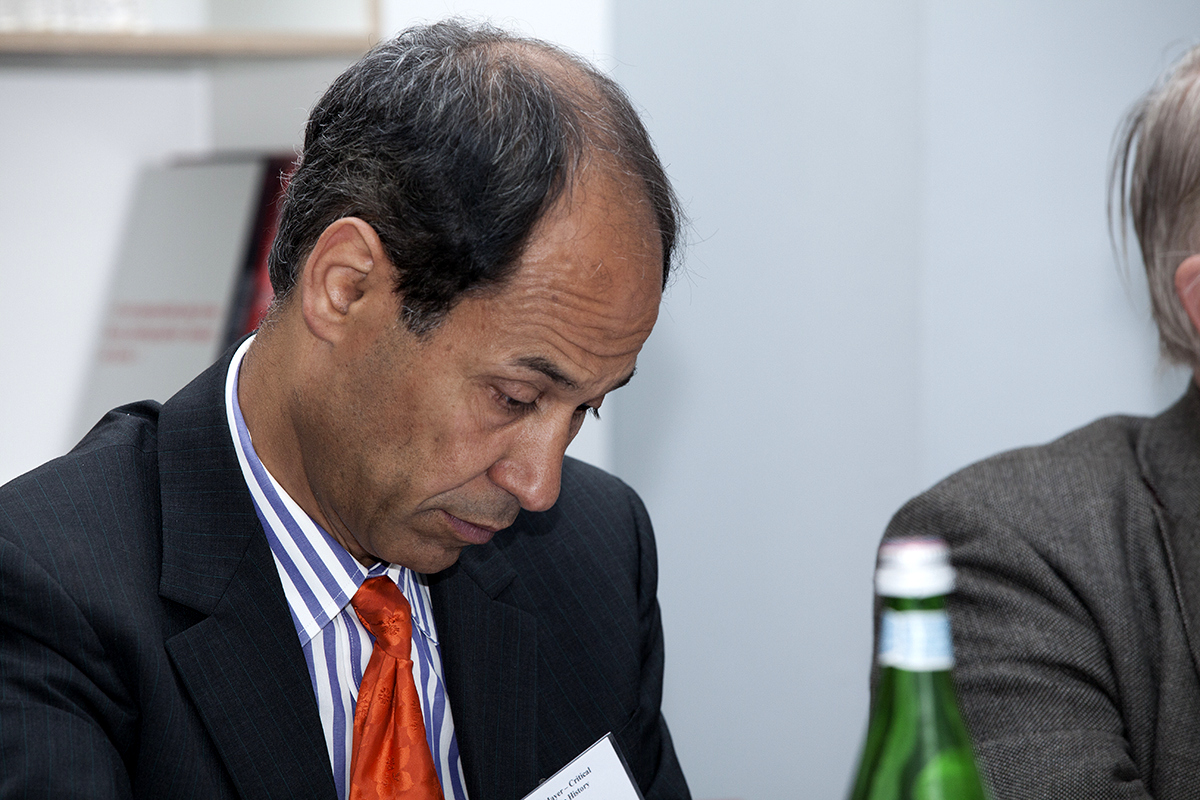
Sam Cherribi (2013)

Since 2000, Cherribi has served as an Affiliate Board Member at University of California-Berkeley's Center for Globalization and Information Technology.

== Publications ==
Cherribi is Series Editor at Peter Lang Publishing in New York City.

Cherribi is a contributing editor at Global Vision, an international magazine aimed at reporting on business executives and government officials. Subjects of his articles and interviews have included: UN Secretary General Kofi Annan, US President Jimmy Carter, Israeli President Shimon Peres, Irish President Mary Robinson, fashion designer Kenneth Cole and the Dalai Lama.

Cherribi researched and drafted two best-selling Dutch books, Moslim en de polder (1997), and Islam en democratie (1994), for then-VVD leader Frits Bolkestein and Mohammed Arkoun.

In 2002, Cherribi directed, produced and wrote a play, To be or not to be in the Polder.

In 2010, Cherribi published In The House of War: Dutch Islam Observed. This book, published by Oxford University Press, discusses "‘the trifecta of coercion’ on Muslims in the Netherlands and Europe, being: expectations and pressures from Islamic orthodoxy, from European society, and from their daily lives in the house of war (Dar al Harb)." The book employs many of philosopher-sociologist Pierre Bourdieu’s theories, including Bourdieu’s "five laws" for analyzing the development of Islam in Europe (The Algerians). Professor Terry Rey of Temple University, a notable Bourdieu scholar, praised Cherribi, saying: "To my knowledge the only student of Bourdieu’s to have thus far employed his theory of practice in a book length study of religion is Sam Cherribi" (The Oxford Handbook of Pierre Bourdieu, 307–308).

In 2017, Oxford Press published Cherribi's Fridays of Rage, an in-depth analysis of Al Jazeera's inception and its role in impacting the public views of the Arab world. The book was praised by Marwan M. Kraidy, professor of communication at the University of Pennsylvania, for making "an original contribution to the already large literature on Al-Jazeera in its articulation of the channel with political Islamism".

Cherribi has repeatedly contributed to Der Groene Amsterdammer, including interviews with President Jimmy Carter and Jane Fonda, and essays on Al Jazeera and Pierre Bourdieu.

== After Parliament and Emory ==
At Emory, Cherribi has served as assistant to the Provost, Office of the Provost. He also served as Emory's liaison to The Carter Center for development

Cherribi was the interim program director at the Center for the Study of Public Scholarship (CSPS).

Cherribi is currently a Senior Lecturer in the Department of Middle East and South Asian Studies (MESAS) and Associate Senior Lecturer in the Department of Economics at Emory University in Atlanta, Georgia. He also directs the Emory Development Initiative (EDI), which promotes development in low-income countries and works with faculty in Emory's Institute of Human Rights.

== Selected works ==
- Cultuur als visie (1989; with Gijs von der Fuhr and Donald Niedekker)
- Internet and Information Society (1997; Council of Europe)
- Bit bang; in de schaduw van het millennium; de dreiging van de millennium-bug, tips en maatregelen om de problemen het hoofd te bieden (1998; with Luc Sala and Ronald Wouterson)
- Imams d'Amsterdam; à travers l'exemple des imams de la diaspora marocaine (2000; dissertations)
- Anti-Missile Defense: The Implications for European Industry (2001; Western European Union)
- Developing a European Space Observation Capability to meet Europe’s Security Requirements (2002; Western European Union)
- The Global Aspects of the Internet (2003; Academic Press)
- Outing the Dutch: Intolerance, Populism and the Media (2003; Comunicazione politica, IV/2 pp. 141–165)
- From Baghdad to Paris: Al-Jazeera and the Veil (2006; The Harvard International Journal of Press/Politics)
- Politicians’ Perceptions of the Muslim Problem: The Dutch Example in European Context (2007; Oxford University Press)
- The Council of Europe’s Human Rights Perspective on the Media (2008; Elsevier Science Publishers)
- U.S. Public Diplomacy in the Arab World Responses to Al-Jazeera’s Interview With Karen Hughes (2008; Sage Publications)
- Making Sense of the Senseless: A Reasoned Approach to Radicalism (2008; International Society of Political Psychology)
- The Future of American Consumerism (2009; Meghan-Kiffer Press)
- In the House of War: Dutch Islam Observed (2010; Oxford University Press)
- An Obsession Renewed: Islamophobia in Austria, Germany and the Netherlands (2011; Oxford University Press)
- Arabic Al-Jazeera: Transnational Identity and Influence (2012; Sage Publications)
- Race and Color in the Middle East (2012; Sage Publications)
- A Dutch Perspective: History, Politics, and Outcomes (2016; The Carter Center)
- Fridays of Rage (2017; Oxford University Press)
- Pluralism and Intolerance: The New Dutch Treat (Georgetown University)
