= Hans Hillen =

Dutch politician (born 1947)

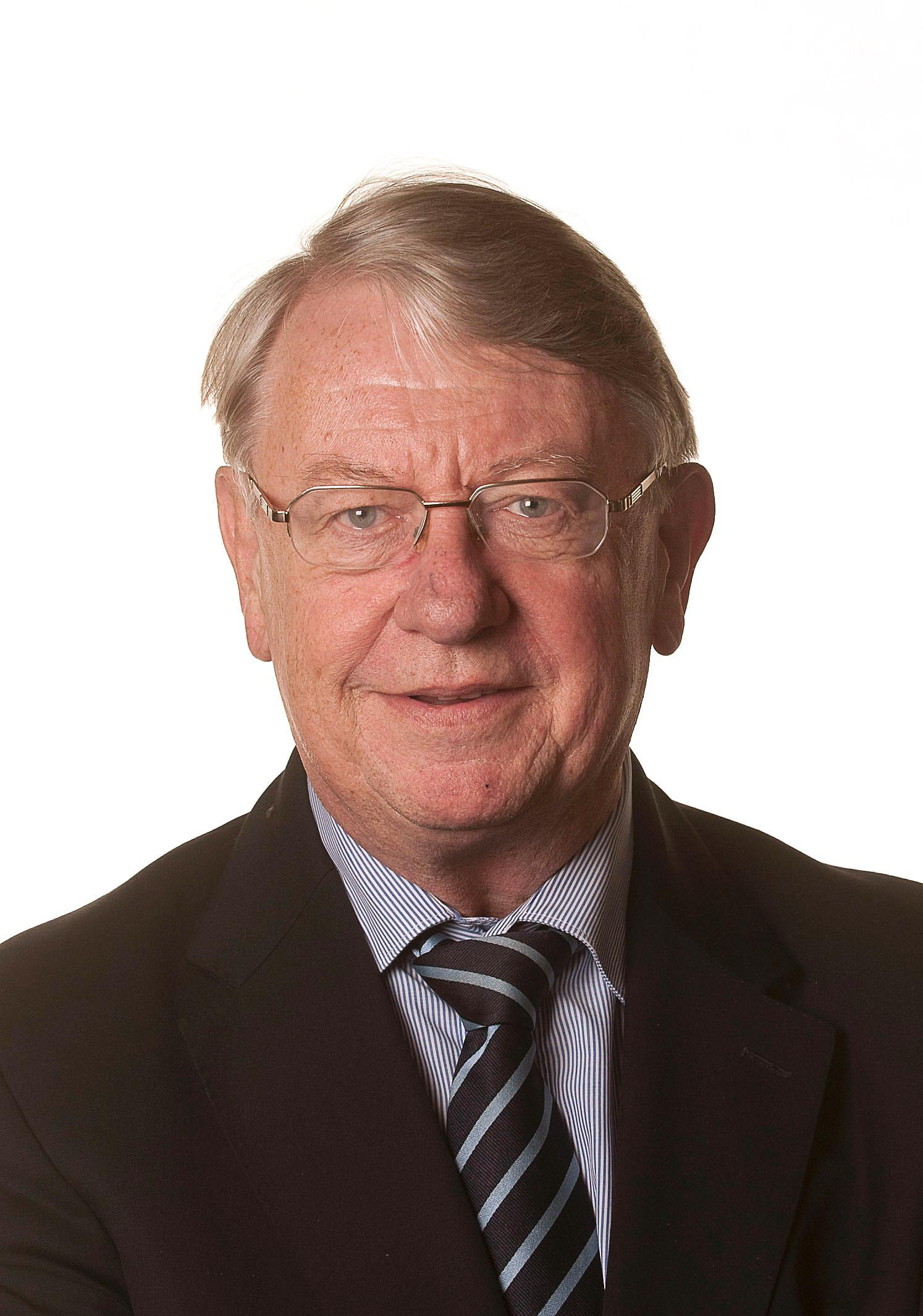

Minister of Defence
- In office 14 October 2010 – 5 November 2012
- Prime Minister: Mark Rutte
- Preceded by: Eimert van Middelkoop
- Succeeded by: Jeanine Hennis-Plasschaert

Member of the Senate
- In office 12 June 2007 – 14 October 2010
- Parliamentary group: Christian Democratic Appeal

Member of the House of Representatives
- In office 20 March 1990 – 23 May 2002
- Parliamentary group: Christian Democratic Appeal

Personal details
- Born: Johannes Stefanus Joseph Hillen; 17 June 1947 (age 79) The Hague, Netherlands
- Party: Christian Democratic Appeal (from 1980)
- Other political affiliations: Catholic People's Party (until 1980)
- Education: Utrecht University (Bachelor of Social Science, Master of Social Science)
- Occupation: Politician · Civil servant · Political consultant · Corporate director · Nonprofit director · Trade association executive · Teacher · Journalist · Editor · Television presenter · Author · Columnist · Political pundit · Lobbyist

Johannes Stefanus Joseph "Hans" Hillen (born 17 June 1947) is a retired Dutch politician of the Christian Democratic Appeal (CDA) party and journalist.

== Biography ==
=== Early life ===
Hillen studied sociology at Utrecht University. He has been a (sports) journalist for the Nederlandse Omroep Stichting (NOS), a teacher and a civil servant (in the eighties he was spokesman for the minister of Finance Onno Ruding and defender of his outspoken budget cuts) before entering politics.

=== Politics ===
From 1990 till 2002 he was a member of the House of Representatives and from 2007 till 2010 a member of the Senate. From October 14, 2010, to November 5, 2012, he was minister of Defence. He is in favor of a strong defence and close ties with NATO.

=== Other activities ===
From 2003 till 2007 Hillen was president of CVZ, the Dutch council for the healthcare, and from 2005 till 2010 a member of the executive board of the Dutch employers' organization VNO-NCW. He also did some writing, he wrote columns for Elsevier and Katholiek Nieuwsblad.

Furthermore, he is involved in the Edmund Burke Foundation, a Dutch conservative think tank. In 2004 he left the advisory council because a conflict of opinion with prominent co-member Bart Jan Spruyt, who wanted to found a new political party with Geert Wilders.

=== Personal life ===
Hillen is married and resides in Hilversum. He is a member of the Roman Catholic Church.

== Decorations ==
Honours
Ribbon bar	Honour	Country	Date	Comment
	Officer of the Order of Orange-Nassau	Netherlands	7 December 2012	Elevated from Knight (22 May 2002)

Civic offices
Unknown	Chairman of the Council for Healthcare Insurance; 2003–2007	Unknown
Political offices
Preceded by Eimert van Middelkoop	Minister of Defence; 2010–2012	Succeeded by Jeanine Hennis-Plasschaert
Non-profit organization positions
Preceded by Eric Fischer	Chairman of the Council for Training and Education; 2013–present	Incumbent
