= Nieuwpoort, South Holland =

Nieuwpoort
- City
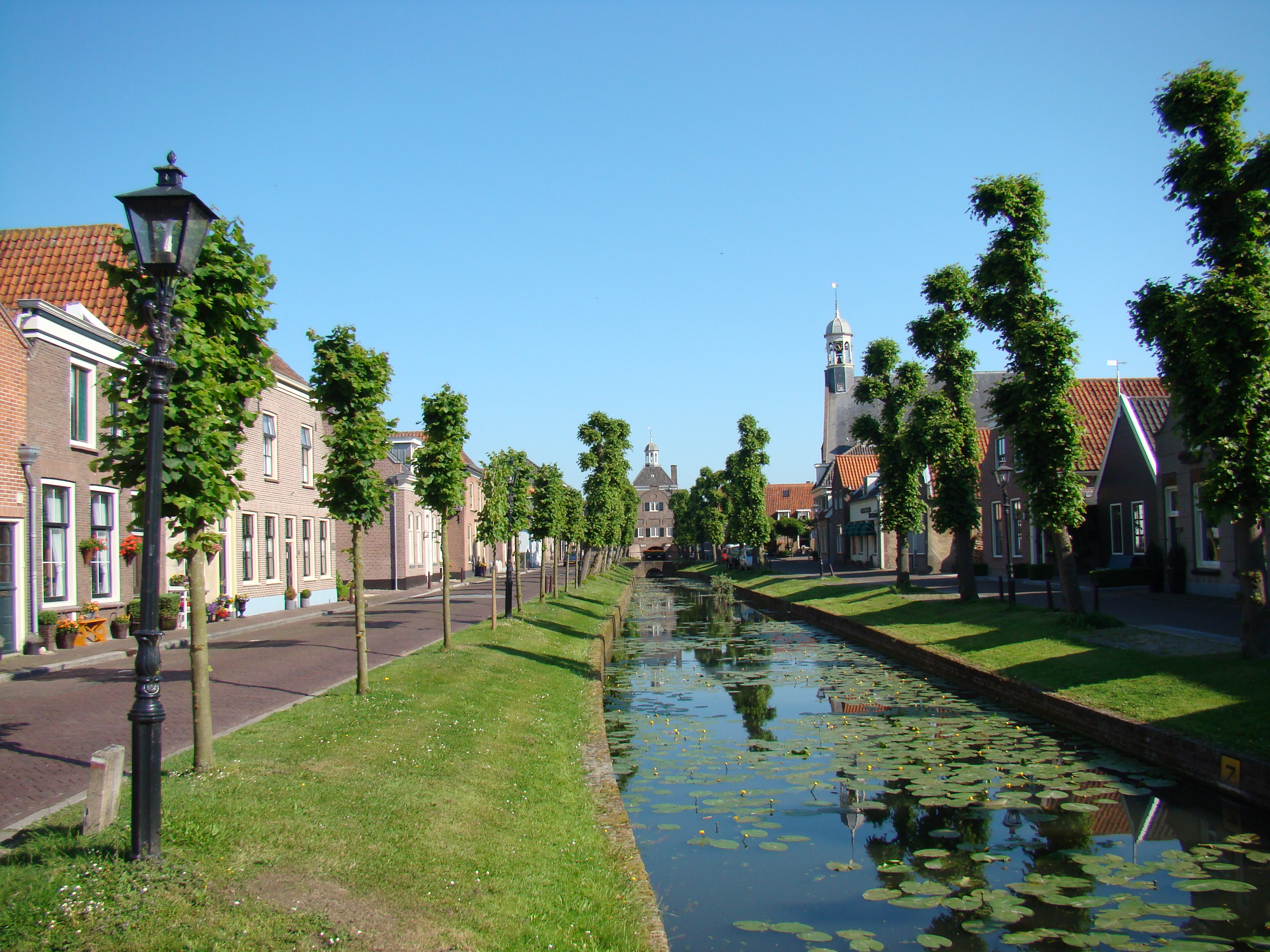
- Harbour

- Coat of arms

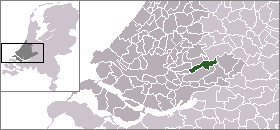

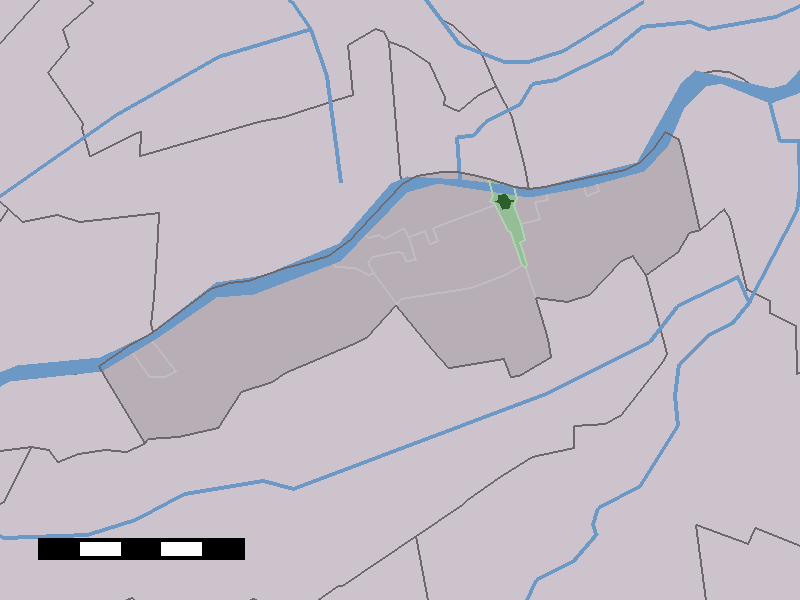
- The city centre (dark green) and the statistical district (light green) of Nieuwpoort in the former municipality of Liesveld.
- Coordinates: 51°56′N 4°52′E
- Country: Netherlands
- Province: South Holland
- Municipality: Molenlanden

Population (1 jan 2004)
  - Total: 1,394
- Time zone: UTC+1 (CET)
  - Summer (DST): UTC+2 (CEST)
- Postal code: 2965
- Dialing code: 0184

Nieuwpoort is a tiny city in the Netherlands in the municipality of Molenlanden. The place was given city rights in 1283.

In 2001, the city of Nieuwpoort had 619 inhabitants. The built-up area of the city was 0.092 km², and contained 230 residences. The statistical area "Nieuwpoort", which also can include the surrounding countryside, has a population of around 1370 (2006).

== History ==
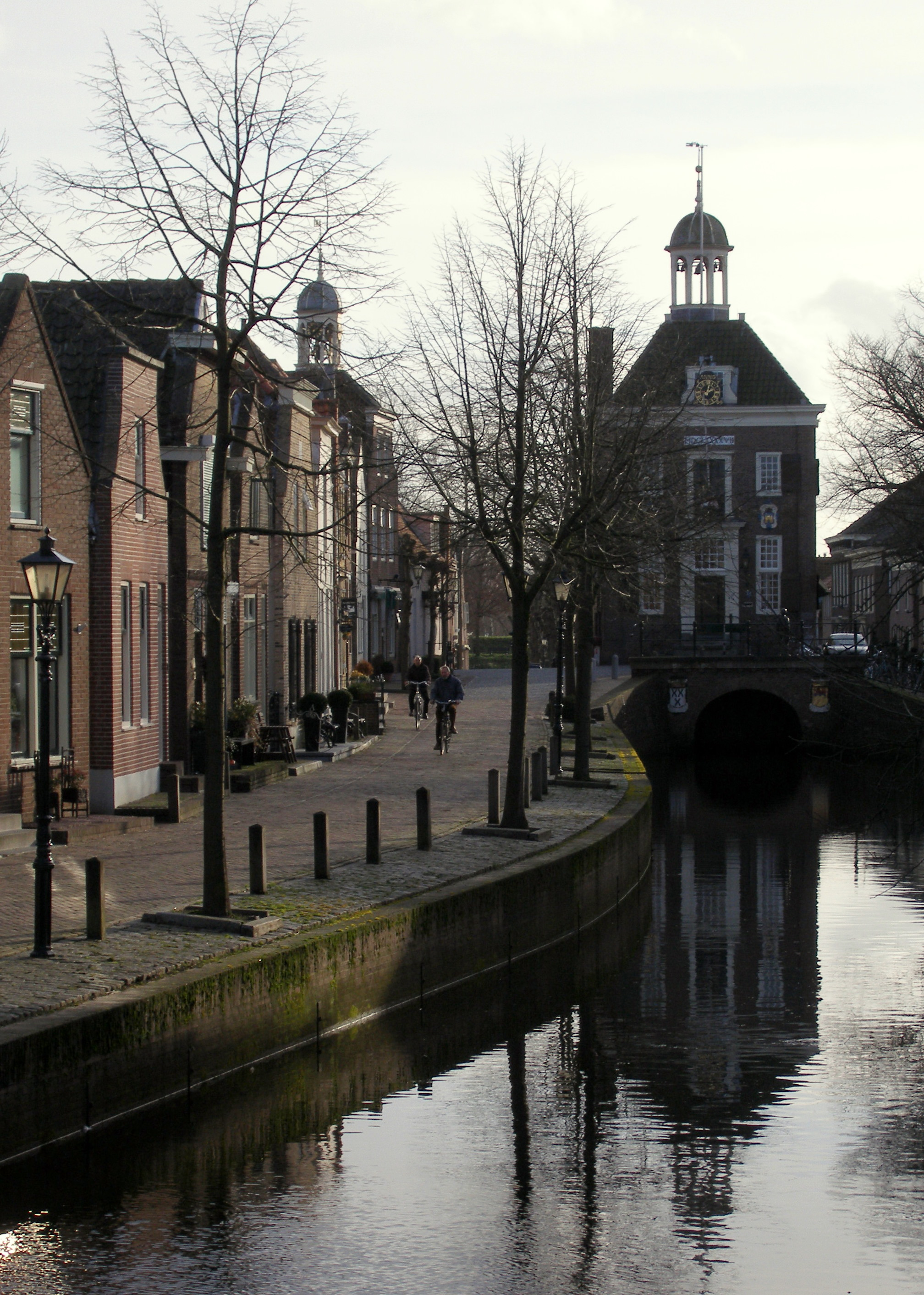
The former town hall (1697)

In the 13th century, the current location of the Nieuwpoort fortress was created by Lord Van Liesveld and Lord Van Langerack. The two lords wanted a settlement and in 1270, they both gave some of their property to make this happen. In 1283, the fortress was given town privileges.

After a turbulent beginning, with many sieges and devastation, more peaceful times eventually arrived in the 17th century. The city ramparts saved the city from floods in 1809 and 1820. Due to an economical crisis in the 1930s and World War II, the town decayed. In 1970, the Provincial States of South Holland initiated a reconstruction and restoration of the fortress and the town. This work was finished in 1998.

Nieuwpoort was a separate municipality until 1986, when it became part of Liesveld, and then became part of Molenwaard in 2013.
