= Roel Kuiper =

Dutch politician

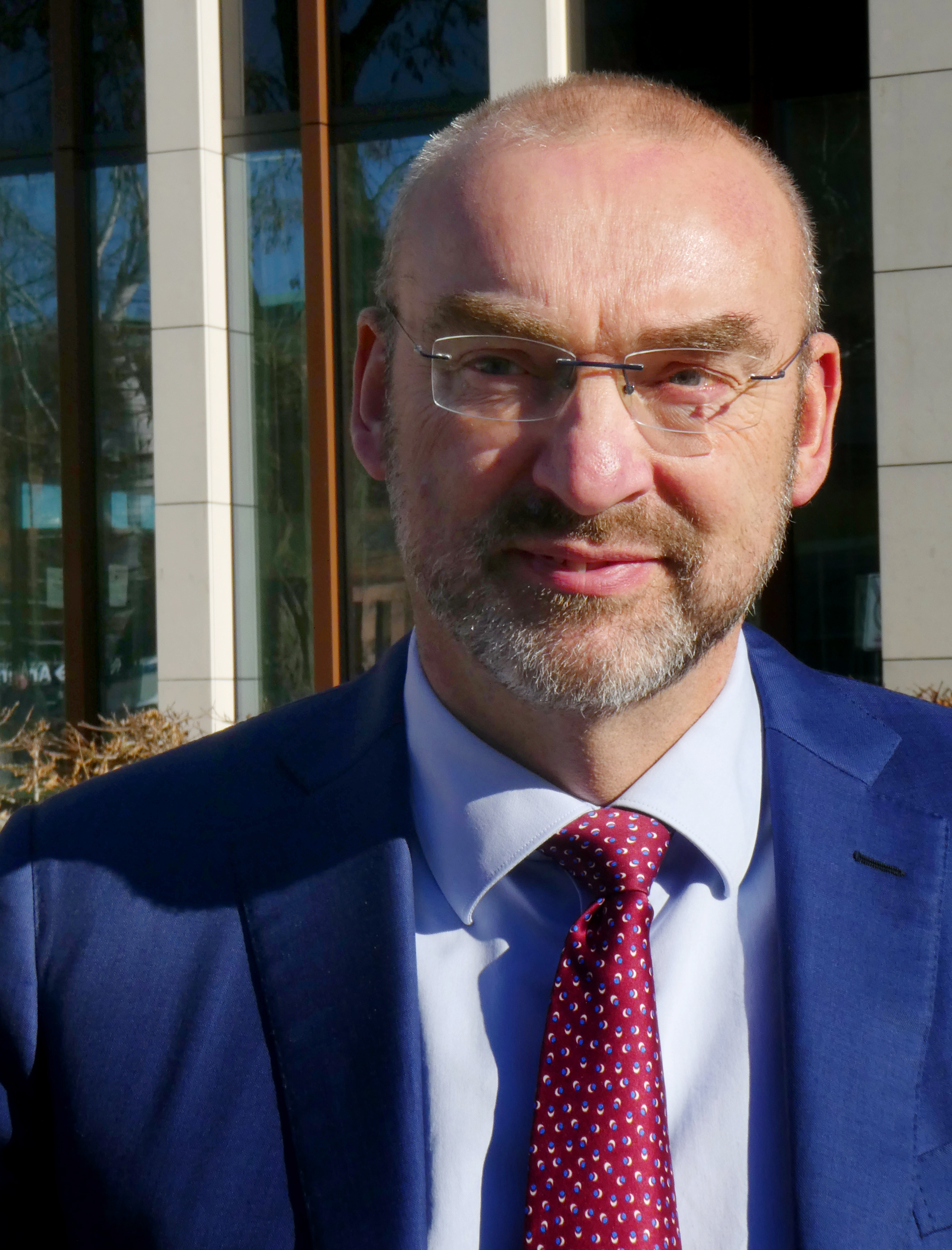

Leader of the Christian Union in the Senate
- In office 7 June 2011 – 11 June 2019
- Preceded by: Egbert Schuurman
- Succeeded by: Mirjam Bikker

Member of the Senate
- In office 12 June 2007 – 11 June 2019

Personal details
- Born: Roelof Kuiper; 5 April 1962 (age 64) Mariënberg
- Party: Christian Union
- Education: VU University Amsterdam (MA and PhD, history; MA, philosophy)
- Occupation: Politician, historian, philosopher
- Website: ChristianUnion biography

Roelof (Roel) Kuiper (born 5 April 1962 in Mariënberg) is a Dutch historian, philosopher, ideologue, politician and university professor. He was from 2007 to 2019 a member of the Dutch Senate, and is professor of Reformational philosophy at the Erasmus Universiteit Rotterdam in the name of the Association for Reformational philosophy, teaching Society Issues at the Christelijke Hogeschool Ede and Gereformeerde Hogeschool Zwolle and Political and social philosophy at the Vrije Universiteit Amsterdam (VU).

Kuiper received his doctorate in History in 1986 at the VU. In 1992 he got his promotion at the same university on the subject: Zelfbeeld en wereldbeeld: antirevolutionairen en het buitenland 1848–1905. He received his doctorate in Philosophy at the VU in 1998.

== Positions ==
After his doctorate in History Kuiper had, besides what is written above, different other positions, such as teacher at the MO-teacherseducation History, at the Evangelische Hogeschool in Amersfoort, from 1991 until 1995 he was director of the Association for Reformational Philosophy in Utrecht and in 1995 he succeeded André Rouvoet as director of the Marnix van Sint Aldegonde Stichting, the Scientific Institute of the Reformational Political Federation until 2002. From 2000 until 2002 he was director of the Scientific Institute of the Christian Union, the Groen van Prinsterer Stichting.

Kuiper was a member of "Nationale Conventie", a think tank for a revision of the national political system. This system consists presently of an executive government, a bicameral parliament, the judiciary and the political parties. The central question was if changes in that system could contribute to recovery of faith between citizens and government. He has also served as a professor specialized in Christian identity at the Theological University of the Reformed Churches.

The historical, political and philosophical publications by Kuiper are often apologetic by nature, defending the Christian faith in the Netherlands against ongoing secularization. Many of his ideas are inspired by Guillaume Groen van Prinsterer, the intellectual father of the Antirevolutionary Party; Kuiper wrote a biography of Groen in 2001.

== Politics ==
Kuiper was a Christian Union member of the Senate from 12 June 2007 until 11 June 2019. He was also a Senate group leader from 7 June 2011 until 11 June 2019, succeeding Egbert Schuurman. Following the party losing two of its five seats in the 2023 general election, Kuiper was tasked with reshaping its vision. His assignment included investigating the party's participation in the fourth Rutte cabinet and investigating whether the Christian Union had become too leftist.

== Publications ==
- Zelfbeeld en wereldbeeld. Antirevolutionairen en het buitenland, 1848–1905 (Uitgeverij Kok: Kampen, 1992). Proefschrift.
- Herenmuiterij. Vernieuwing en sociaal conflict in de antirevolutionaire beweging, 1871–1894 (Leiden, 1994)
- Uitzien naar de zin. Inleiding tot een christelijke geschiedbeschouwing (Uitgeverij Groen: leiden, 1996).
- ‘Das abschied eines antirevolutionärs von Deutschland. Abraham Kuyper (1837–1920) und Adolf Stoecker (1835–1909)’, in: Jahrbuch Zentrum Für Niederlande-Studien (Verlag Regensberg: Münster, 1998).
- Op zoek naar de samenleving. Over anti-utopisch denken en politieke verantwoordelijkheid (Rotterdam, 1999). Inaugurele oratie.
- Op het breukvlak van twee millennia (Willem de Zwijgerstichting: Apeldoorn, 1999)
- Kunst van het leven. De cultuuruitdaging van de 21e eeuw (Rotterdam, 1999). Redactie met L. la Riviere en prof.dr. J.-P. Balkenende
- ‘Tot een voorbeeld zult Gij blijven’. Mr. G. Groen van Prinsterer. Biografie (Amsterdam, 2001).
- ‘Techniek en politiek: humaniteit, moraliteit en openbaar bestuur’, in: Kees Boersma, Jan van der Stoep, Maarten Verkerk, Ad Vlot, Aan Babels stromen. Een bevrijdend perspectief op ethiek en techniek (Amsterdam, 2002).
- ‘Human Identity and Reformational Social Philosophy’, in: Philosophia Reformata (jaargang 69, 2004, no. 1).
- ‘Dialoog en vervreemding als politieke werkelijkheid’, in: Govert Buijs, Peter Blokhuis, Sander Griffioen, Roel Kuiper (redactie), Homo Respondens. Verkenningen rond het mens-zijn (Buijten en Schipperheijn: Amsterdam, 2005).
- Over de schutting, Op weg naar nieuwe solidariteit, Redactie samen met Cors Visser (Buijten en Schipperheijn: Amsterdam, 2005).
- ‘Groen van Prinsterer’s Ongeloof en Revolutie (1847)’, in: F.G.M. Broeyer en D.Th. Kuiper, Is ’t waar of niet? Ophefmakende publicaties uit de ‘lange’ negentiende eeuw (Meinema: Zoetermeer, 2005).
- ‘Heimat und Fremde – Herausforderungen im Zeitalter von Migration und Globalisierung’, in: Erkenntnis und Glaube, band 36 (Evangelische Verlagsanstalt: Leipzig, 2006).
- ‘De praktijk van het sociaal werk’, in: Henk Jochemsen, Roel Kuiper, Bram de Muynck, Een theorie over praktijken. Normatief praktijkmodel voor zorg, sociaal werk en onderwijs (Buijten en Schipperheijn: Amsterdam, 2006).

Party political offices
Preceded by Egbert Schuurman	Leader of the Christian Union in the Senate; 2011–2019	Succeeded by Mirjam Bikker
