= Eimert van Middelkoop =

Dutch politician (born 1949)

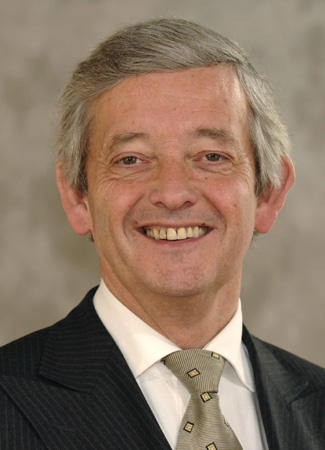
- Van Middelkoop in 2007

Minister for Housing, Communities and Integration
- In office 23 February 2010 – 14 October 2010
- Prime Minister: Jan Peter Balkenende
- Preceded by: Eberhard van der Laan
- Succeeded by: Office discontinued

Minister of Defence
- In office 22 February 2007 – 14 October 2010
- Prime Minister: Jan Peter Balkenende
- Preceded by: Henk Kamp
- Succeeded by: Hans Hillen

Member of the Senate
- In office 10 June 2003 – 22 February 2007

Leader of the Reformed Political League
- In office 14 February 2001 – 13 March 2001
- Preceded by: Gert Schutte
- Succeeded by: Office discontinued

Parliamentary leader in the House of Representatives
- In office 14 February 2001 – 13 March 2001
- Preceded by: Gert Schutte
- Succeeded by: Office discontinued
- Parliamentary group: Reformed Political League

Member of the House of Representatives
- In office 14 May 1989 – 23 May 2002

Personal details
- Born: Eimert van Middelkoop; 14 February 1949 (age 77) Berkel en Rodenrijs, Netherlands
- Party: Christian Union (from 2002)
- Other political affiliations: Reformed Political League (1973–2002)
- Children: 3 sons and 1 daughter
- Education: Erasmus University Rotterdam (Bachelor of Social Science)
- Occupation: Politician; civil servant; political consultant; nonprofit director; teacher

Eimert van Middelkoop (Dutch pronunciation: [ˈɛimərt fɑ ˈmɪdəlkoːp]; (Note: In isolation, van is pronounced [vɑn].) born 14 February 1949) is a retired Dutch politician of the Christian Union (CU) party and teacher. He is the chairman of the Institute for Multiparty Democracy since 20 January 2018.

== Early life ==
After high school, van Middelkoop attended what is now Erasmus University, earning a B.A. in Sociology in 1971. In 1971 and 1972, he was a teacher at the Reformed Social Academy in Zwolle. He was exempt from military draft for being indispensable as staff member of the Reformed Political League in the House of Representatives.

== Politics ==
Van Middelkoop became a member of the House of Representatives in 1989, while affiliated with the Reformed Political League. Since 2000, he has been aligned with the Christian Union, which was the product of a fusion of the Reformatory Political Federation (RPF) and the Reformatory Political Federation (GPV). He specialised in foreign and military affairs, prepared the inquiry by the House of Representatives into the role of the Netherlands in the fall of Srebrenica. He lost his seat in the House of Representatives in the 2002 election.

From 2003 until 2007, van Middelkoop was a member of the Senate. In the 2006 elections, the Christian Union party doubled its seats and joined the fourth Balkenende cabinet. Van Middelkoop became Minister of Defence in 2007.

In September 2008, he told the Dutch opinion magazine, Vrij Nederland, that he would have been very unhappy to have joined the army. Because of this and other remarks, he received criticism from military labour unions, who said that Van Middelkoop had lost his credibility.

== Decorations ==
Honours
Ribbon bar	Honour	Country	Date	Comment
	Ghazi Mir Bacha Khan Medal	Afghanistan	2010	
	Officer of the Order of Orange-Nassau	Netherlands	3 December 2010	Elevated from Knight (23 May 2002)

== Notes ==
Party political offices
Preceded by Gert Schutte	Leader of the Reformed; Political League; 2001	Party merged into the Christian Union
Preceded by Gert Schutte	Parliamentary leader of the Reformed Political League in the House of Representatives; 2001	Party merged into the Christian Union
Political offices
Preceded by Henk Kamp	Minister of Defence; 2007–2010	Succeeded by Hans Hillen
Preceded by Eberhard van der Laan	Minister for Housing, Communities and Integration; 2010	Office discontinued
Non-profit organization positions
Preceded by Ben Bot	Chairman of the Institute for Multiparty Democracy; 2018–present	Incumbent
