= Egbert Schuurman =

Dutch philosopher and politician

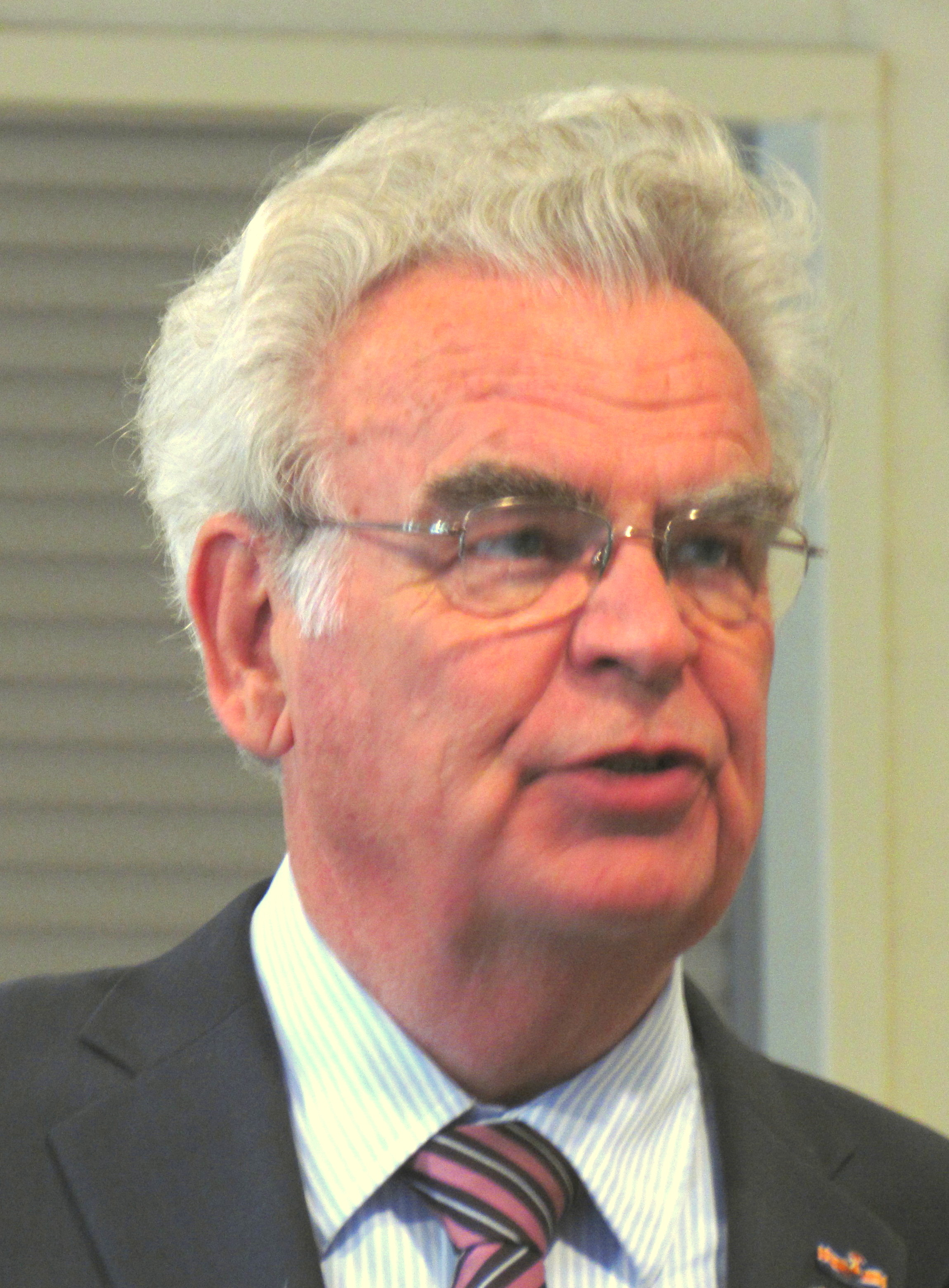
Egbert Schuurman

Egbert Schuurman (born 23 July 1937) is a Dutch engineer, philosopher, politician for the Christian Union, and Emeritus Professor of Philosophy in the Netherlands.

== Biography ==
Born in Borger, Schuurman attended the Protestant primary school in Drenthe Nieuwbuinen, and the HBS-b in Stadskanaal, where he received his diploma on 18 June 1955. After studying civil engineering at the HTS in Groningen, Schuurman continued his studies at Delft University of Technology. After his graduation in 1964 Schuurman began to study philosophy at the Vrije Universiteit in Amsterdam, a study which he completed in 1968. In 1972 Schuurman received his PhD with a thesis entitled Techniek en Toekomst - Confrontatie met wijsgerige beschouwingen ("Technology and Future - Confrontation with philosophical considerations") under supervision of Hendrik Van Riessen.

From 1964 Schuurman had started his academic career at the Technical University of Delft, and in 1966 moved to the Vrije Universiteit. In 1972 he was also appointed Professor in the Reformed Philosophy at the Technical University of Eindhoven, which he remained until 2004. From 1975 to 2004 and he also held that post at the Technical University in Delft, and from 1984 to September 2007 at the University of Wageningen. The latter was in large part devoted to agriculture. Among his students in Amsterdam was Sytse Strijbos, and in Delft he was succeeded by Marc de Vries.

From 1983 to 2011 he was also a member of the Senate, serving among others as the chairman of the Christian Union party caucus and Senate group leader (succeeded by Roel Kuiper).

Schuurman was Visiting Professor on topics from the philosophy of technology in Canada, the United States, England, Korea, Japan, South Africa and Brazil. In 1994 was awarded an honorary doctorate in Technical Sciences at the University of North West (Potchefstroom), South Africa. In 1995 he was awarded the Templeton Award in Berkeley at the Center for Theology and Natural Sciences. In 2003 he was awarded officer in the Order of Orange-Nassau.

== Work ==
Schuurman's research interest is most concerned with exploring and developing Reformational philosophy and its organised expression, the Association for Reformational Philosophy.

From 1983 to 1984 he was in the U.S. part of an international research team on Responsible Technology. He was from 1981 to 1983 member of the so-called DNA-Wide Committee, acting on behalf of the government studied the social and ethical aspects of work with genetic material. He was a member of the steering committee of The Royal Institute of Engineers on "Limits to technology".

Besides his thesis and future technology, he has published many other writings - see Bibliography. His latest book is: "Believe in Science and Technology". Several books Schuurman are translated into English, Korean, Japanese, Chinese, Spanish and Portuguese. He was also editor of two international journals in the field of philosophy of technology.

== Publications in English ==
- Reflections on the technological society (1978)
- Modern technology in a Christian-philosophical perspective (1979)
- Faith and Hope in Technology (2003)
- Deliverance from the Technical World Pictures (2004)

Party political offices
First	Leader of the Christian Union in the Senate; 2001–2011	Succeeded by Roel Kuiper
