= Lenny Geluk-Poortvliet =

Dutch politician (born 1943)

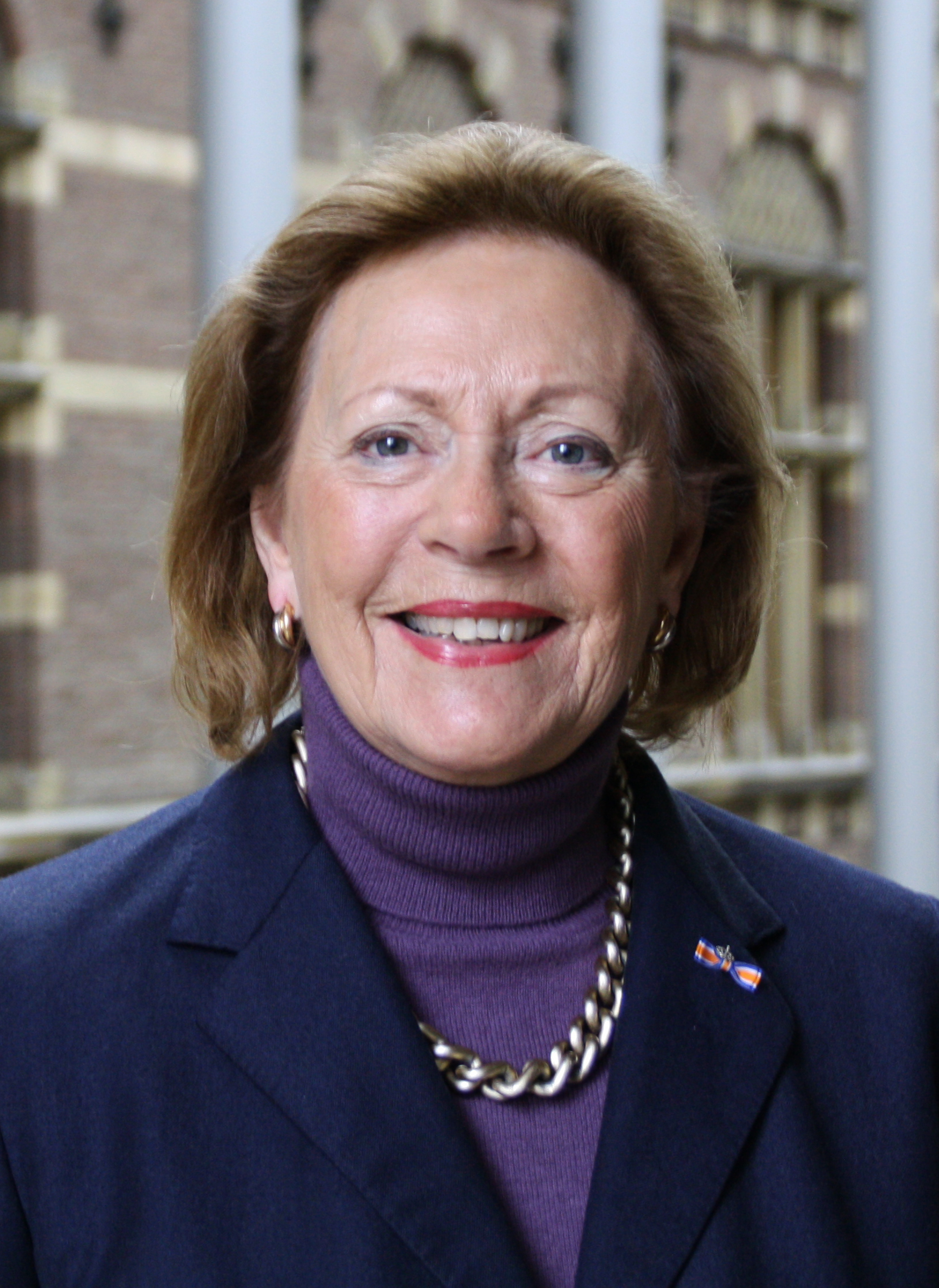

Member of the House of Representatives
- Incumbent
- Assumed office 31 October 2017

Personal details
- Born: Leuntje Wilhelmina Digna Geluk-Poortvliet; 15 July 1943 (age 82) Biezelinge, Kapelle, Netherlands
- Party: Christian Democratic Appeal (1980–present)
- Other party: Christian Historical Union (Until 1980)
- Profession: Politician

Leuntje Wilhelmina Digna Geluk-Poortvliet (born 15 July 1943), known as Lenny Geluk-Poortvliet, is a Dutch politician serving as a Member of the House of Representatives since 31 October 2017. She is a member of the Christian Democratic Appeal. Geluk-Poortvliet was a municipal councillor of Schouwen-Duiveland in the early-2000s.

== Biography ==
Geluk-Poortvliet was born on 15 July 1943 in Biezelinge, Kapelle. She was a member of the Christian Historical Union (CHU), before joining the Christian Democratic Appeal (CDA) in 1980.

In 2002, Geluk-Poortvliet was elected a member of the Schouwen-Duiveland municipal council. A few months later, she was appointed an alderman of the municipality. She was an alderman until 2004, after which she returned to being an ordinary municipal councillor. She also ran an art dealership. Geluk-Poortvliet served as the vice-chairwoman of the CDA in Utrecht and worked for an advisory forum on healthcare.

For the 2003 parliamentary elections, she was 73rd on the CDA's parliamentary list and obtained 273 votes. She was not elected. Geluk-Poortvliet placed 20th on the party's list for the March 2017 general election, which was initially too low for her to be elected. Later that year, on 31 October 2017, Geluk-Poortvliet was sworn in as a member of the House of Representatives. When she took office, Geluk-Poortvliet was at the age of 74, making her the oldest female member of parliament to be serving her first term in Dutch history.

== Electoral history ==
Electoral history of Lenny Geluk-Poortvliet
Year	Body	Party	Pos.	Votes	Result		Ref.
Year	Body	Party	Pos.	Votes	Party seats	Individual	Ref.
2021	House of Representatives	Christian Democratic Appeal	68 (Note: Participated as lijstduwer in the electoral district Utrecht.)	100	15	Lost	
