= François Marits =

Dutch sports shooter

Personal information
- Born: 25 November 1884; Kapelle, Netherlands
- Died: 2 April 1945 (aged 60); Hannover, Germany

Sport
- Sport: Sports shooting

François Marits (25 November 1884 – 2 April 1945) was a Dutch sports shooter. He competed in the 25 m rapid fire pistol event at the 1924 Summer Olympics. He died towards the end of World War II in the Gestapo HQ in Hannover.
