= Eversdijk =

- Hamlet
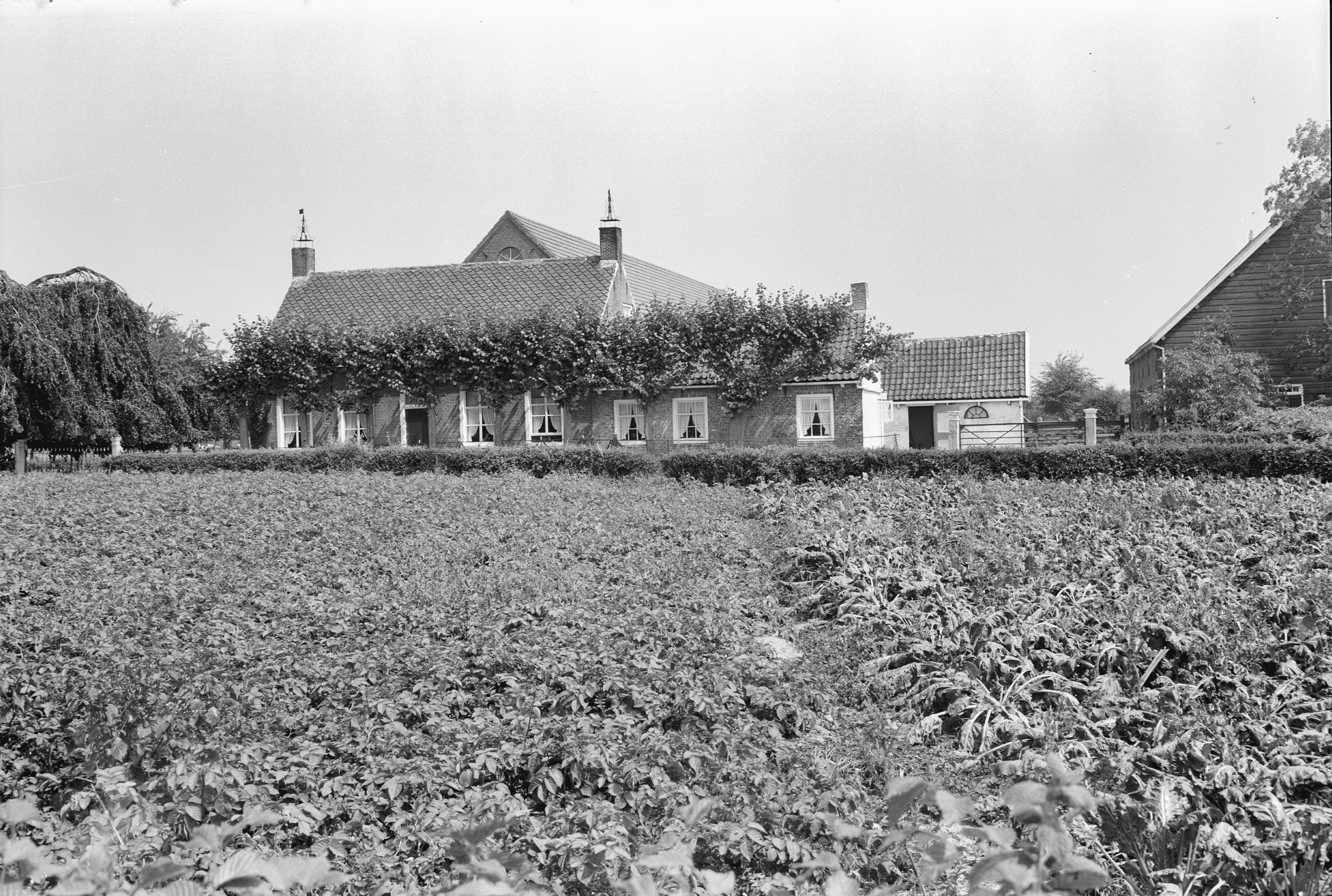
- Farm in Eversdijk

- Location in the province of Zeeland in the Netherlands Eversdijk (Netherlands)
- Coordinates: 51°28′12″N 3°57′11″E
- Country: Netherlands
- Province: Zeeland
- Municipality: Kapelle

Eversdijk is a hamlet in the Dutch province of Zeeland. It is located in the municipality of Kapelle on the island of Zuid-Beveland. It was built in a typical circular style which is fairly common in south Beveland. The coat of arms of Eversdijk contains a sterling silver wild boar of a black Tincture on a loose green sinople soil.

== History ==
The name comes from an unknown person called Everdeis, who once constructed a dike at this location. The village is built amidst two roads, with a path serving as intersection between them. Within the triangle created, a church was built out of the parish of 's-Heer Abtskerke, and dedicated to St. Paul. The bell was cast in 1525 by Peter Waghevens and the clock carried the following inscription: "Sebastiaen ben ic ghegoten van Peter Waghevens te Mechelen binnen lof heb God tot rechter minnen, MCCCCCLLD." Under this heading one sees four ring-shaped images, perhaps passages of the life of Saint Sebastian.

In the course of the Middle Ages the village of Eversdijk remained stuck in its development. The main reason for this was the depletion of the peat found around the village. In the 17th and 18th centuries Eversdijk became a hamlet and on 1 January 1816, the until then independent commune was attached to that of Kapelle, of which Eversdijk is now a part. The church collapsed in 1821 and in 1840, the bell tower was demolished.

Eversdijk was home to 75 people in 1840. Nowadays, it consists of about 27 houses.
