= Schore, Netherlands =

Schore
- Village
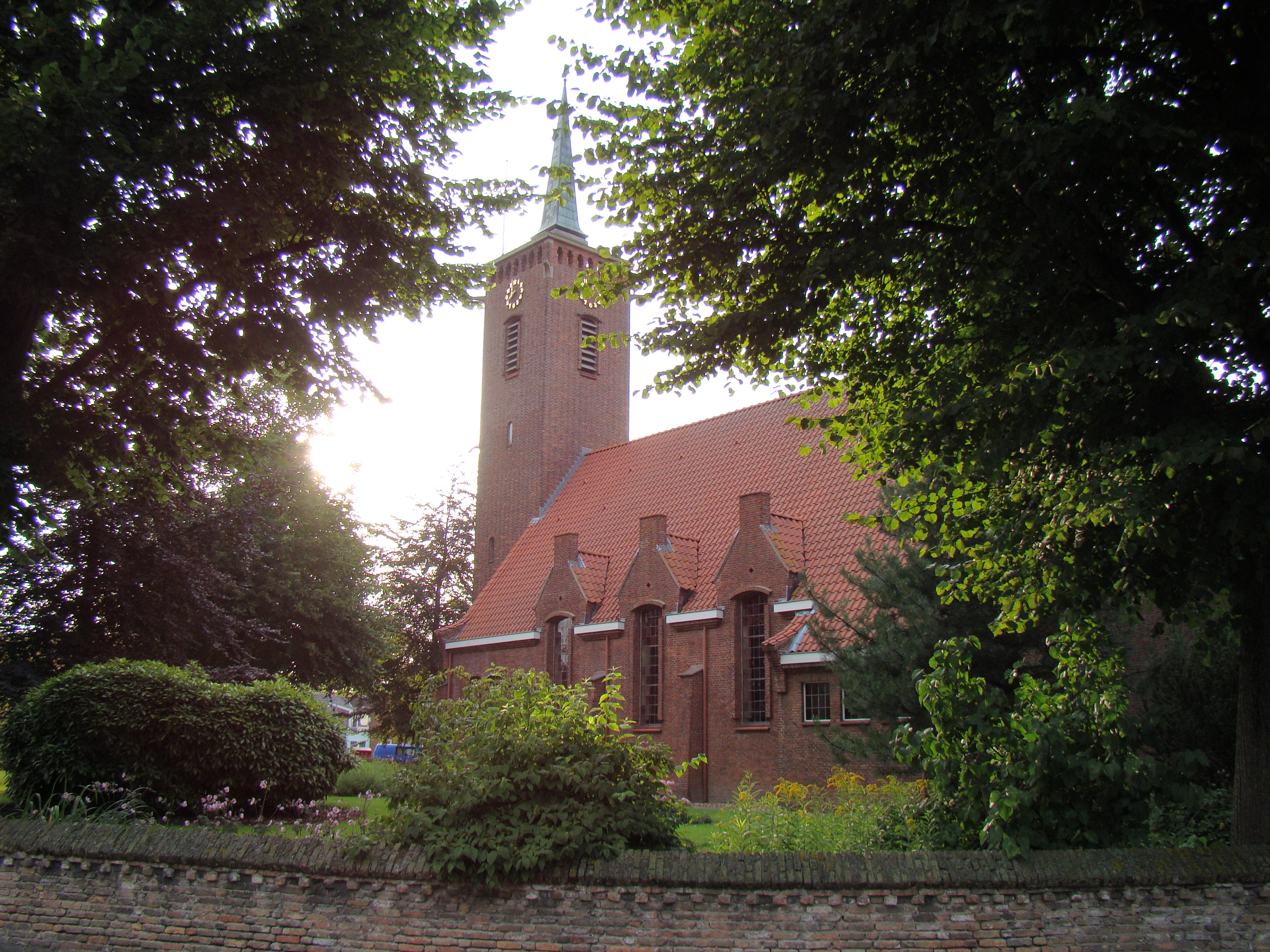
- De kerk van Schore

- Coat of arms

- Location in the province of Zeeland in the Netherlands Schore (Netherlands)
- Coordinates: 51°27′42″N 3°59′58″E
- Country: Netherlands
- Province: Zeeland
- Municipality: Kapelle

Area
  - Total: 3.11 km^{2} (1.20 sq mi)
- Elevation: −0.1 m (−0.33 ft)

Population (2021)
  - Total: 485
  - Density: 156/km^{2} (404/sq mi)
- Time zone: UTC+1 (CET)
  - Summer (DST): UTC+2 (CEST)
- Postal code: 4423
- Dialing code: 0113

Schore is a village in the Dutch province of Zeeland. It is located in the municipality of Kapelle, about 8 km southwest of Goes.

The village was first mentioned in 1253 as Dodinus de Scoren, and means "land on water". Schore is a circular church village. Schore was founded after 1150 when a dike was built around Zuid-Beveland. The village was flooded and destroyed in 1248. It was later rebuilt as a small agricultural community. Schore was home to 261 people in 1840.

The old centre was destroyed in 1940 by war, and redesigned by Jordanus Roodenburgh. The Dutch Reformed church is an aisleless church was a narrow needle spire which was completed in 1942.

Schore was a separate municipality until 1941, when it was merged with Kapelle. It is part of the province of Zeeland, with a population of 485 people
