= Krokettenmotie =

- Coat of arms of Amstelveen
- Enacted: 25 November 1993
- Introduced by: Jan Peter Balkenende

Summary
- Members of the Amstelveen municipal council have the right to a croquette if the meeting lasts until after 23:00
- Status: In force

The Krokettenmotie (English: "croquettes motion") is a motion proposed in the municipal council of Amstelveen on 25 November 1993 by future Prime Minister of the Netherlands Jan Peter Balkenende, who had served as a municipal councillor of Amstelveen for the Christian Democratic Appeal (CDA) since 1982. The motion called for the right of members of the municipal council to a croquette if a council meeting lasts until after 23:00. It was meant as a joke, but because the other parties agreed, the motion was adopted and is still in force.

Balkenende started as a municipal councillor after he finished his studies. The Nederlandse Omroep Stichting (NOS) noted that he had "student-like humour". In 2019, the Labour Party (PvdA) in Amstelveen amended the motion by adding a vegan alternative.

== Similar proposals ==
In 2002, a similar motion came into force in Zwolle. It was decided that if a council meeting lasts until after 22:00, a croquette or similar snack should be served to the councillors. Vegetarian snacks were also mentioned in this new motion.

There was a disagreement about this in the municipal council of Tynaarlo, Drenthe.

Ermelo and Almere's respective municipal councils have also discussed similar motions.
