= Wemeldinge =

Wemeldinge Weumeldienge
- Village
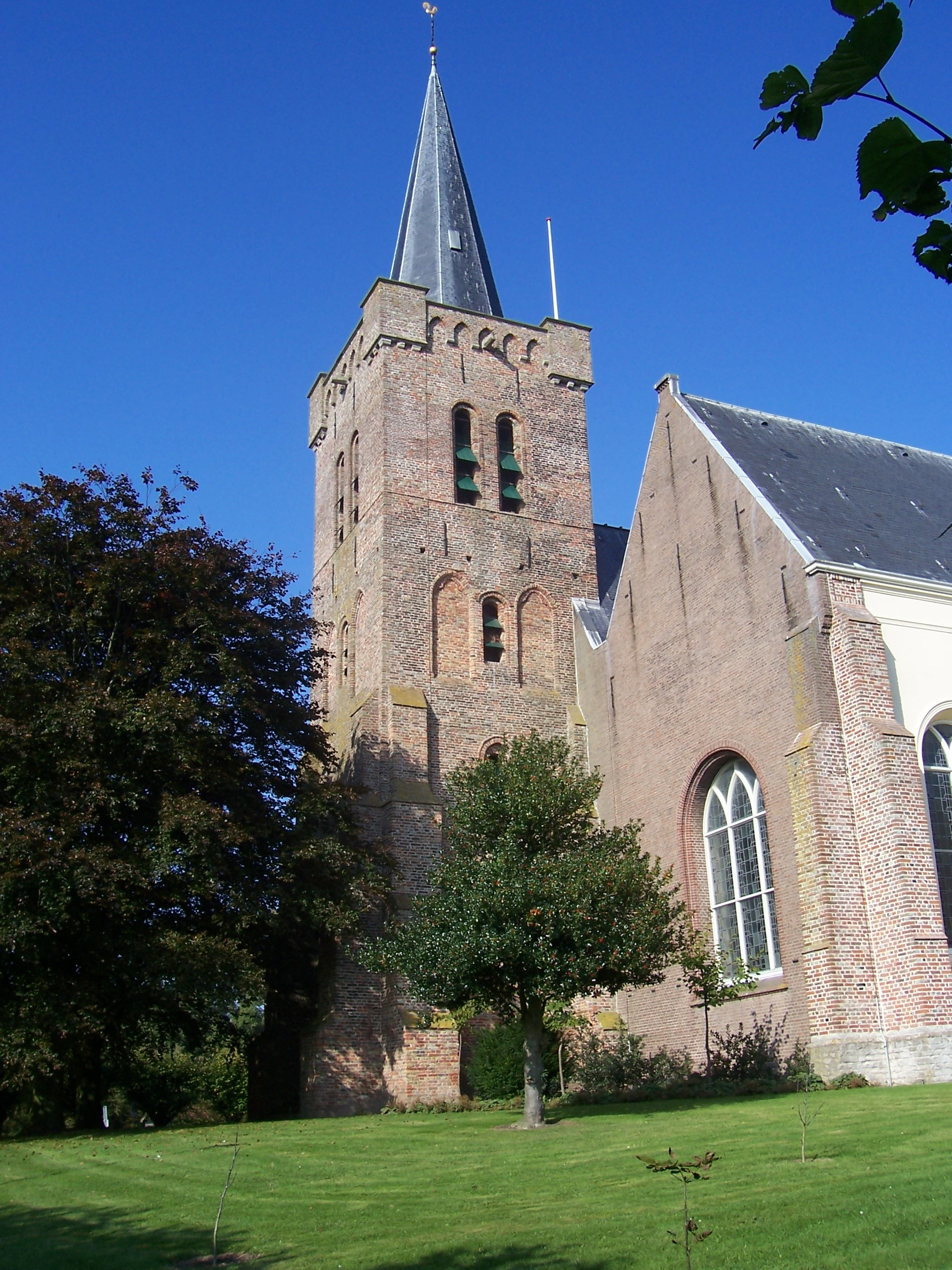
- Church of Wemeldinge

- Flag Coat of arms

- Location in the province of Zeeland in the Netherlands Wemeldinge (Netherlands)
- Coordinates: 51°31′3″N 3°59′44″E
- Country: Netherlands
- Province: Zeeland
- Municipality: Kapelle

Area
  - Total: 8.52 km^{2} (3.29 sq mi)
- Elevation: 0.9 m (3.0 ft)

Population (2021)
  - Total: 3,060
  - Density: 359/km^{2} (930/sq mi)
- Time zone: UTC+1 (CET)
  - Summer (DST): UTC+2 (CEST)
- Postal code: 4424
- Dialing code: 0113

Wemeldinge is the oldest village in the Zuid-Beveland area of the Dutch province of Zeeland. It is located in the municipality of Kapelle, about 4 km northwest of Yerseke. It is located within the Eastern Scheldt national park.

== History ==
The village was first mentioned in 1222 as Gerardus de Wemelbinghe, and means "settlement of the people of Wimeld (person)". Wemeldinge developed in the 11th century on several small terps (artificial hills). There is a 12 metres (39 ft) high hill near the village which used to be topped by a wooden tower. The village later expanded towards the dike.

The Dutch Reformed church is a double aisled church. The tower was built around 1350. The current spire dates from 1611. The church was enlarged in 1530. During the 1898 restoration, the entrance was moved to the choir. It was undone during the 1987 to 1989 restoration. The grist mill De Hoop was built in 1866. It was severely damaged during World War II. It was in use until 1968, and was converted into a holiday home in 1969, however was no application for a building permit and the wind mill remained derelict for a long period. It was bought by the municipality and restored between 1981 and 1983. It is frequently in use.

Wemeldinge was home to 810 people in 1840. Wemeldinge was a separate municipality until 1970, when it was merged with Kapelle.

== Gallery ==
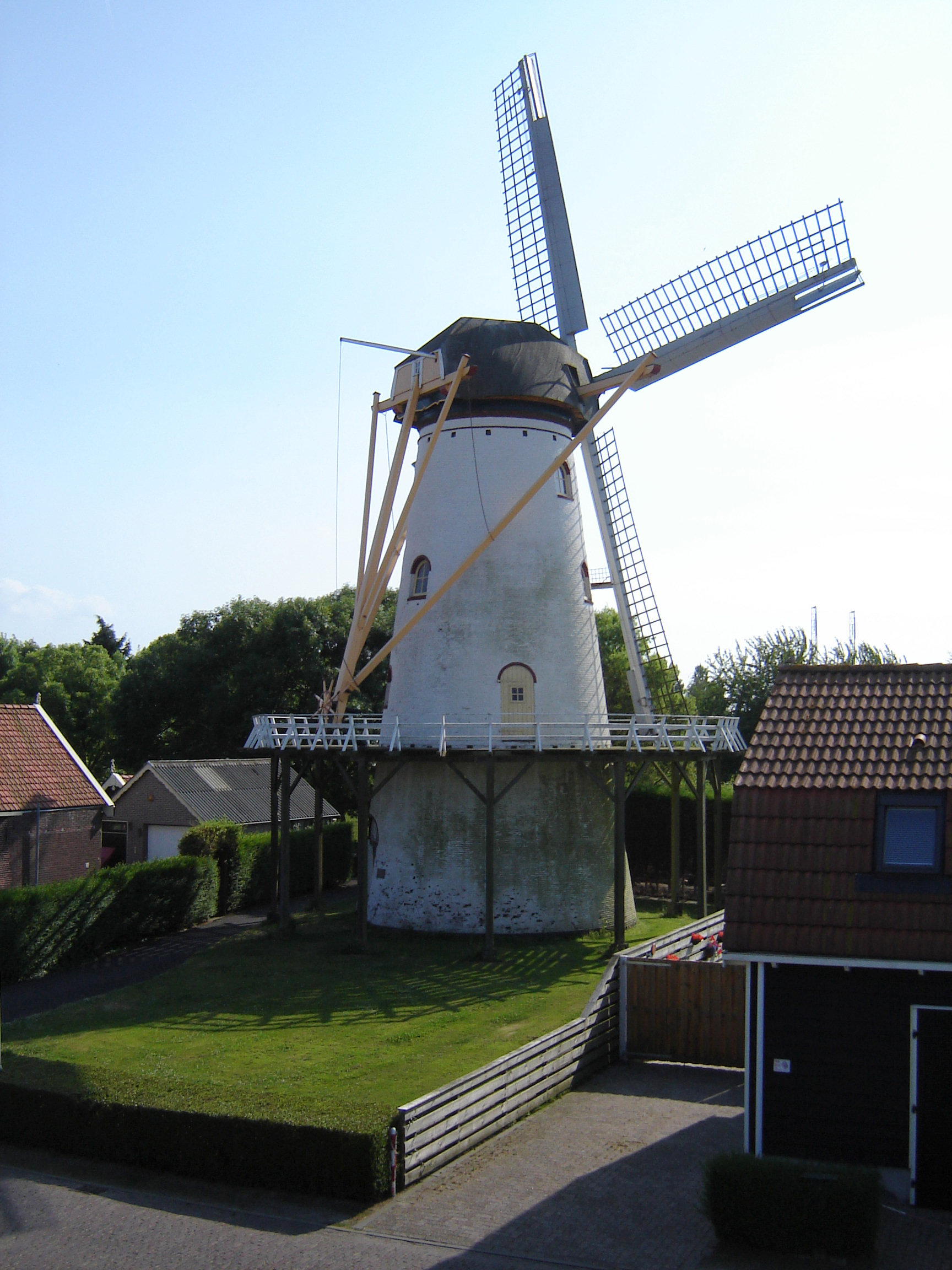
Wind mill De Hoop

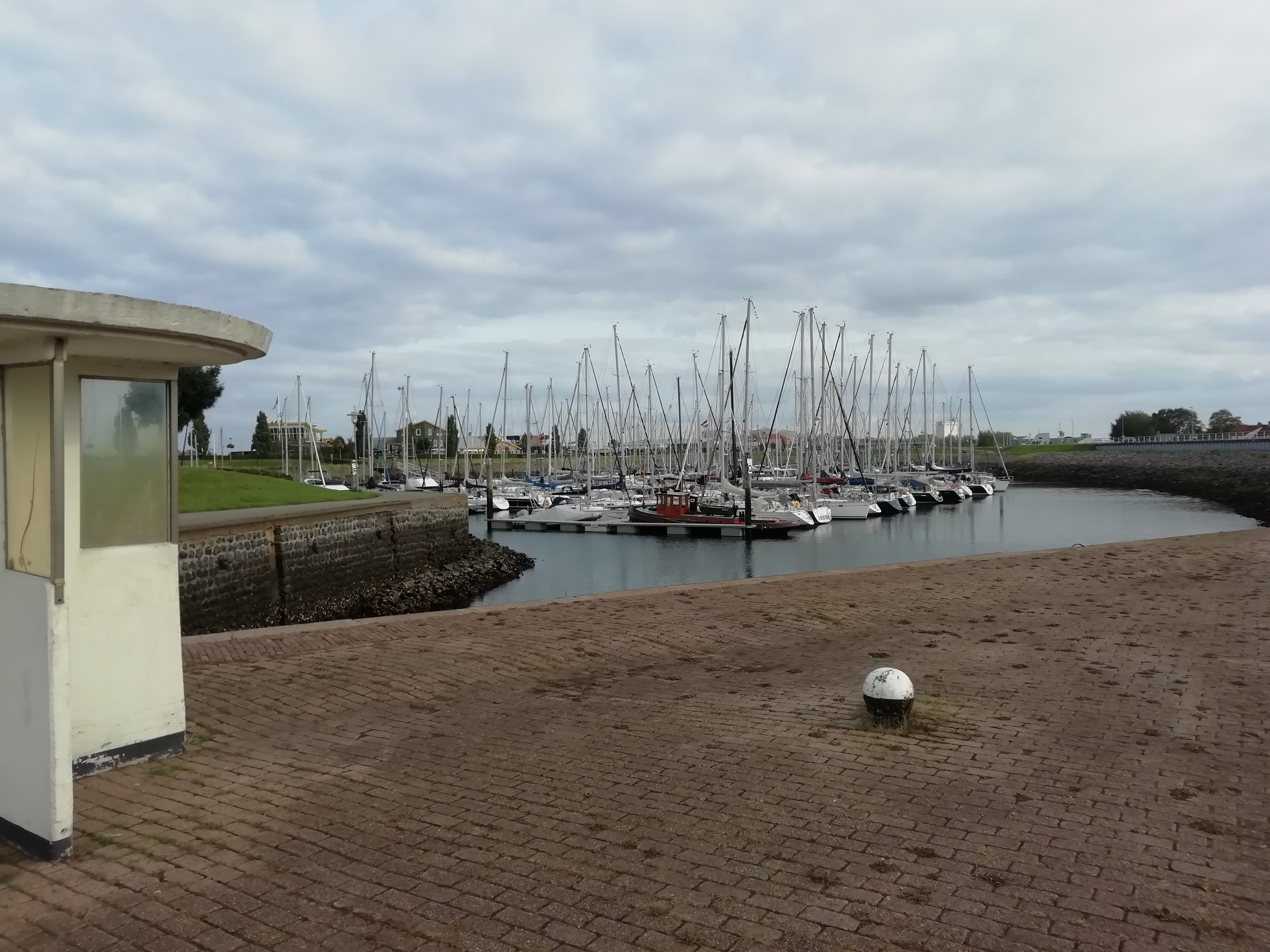
The harbour of Wemeldinge

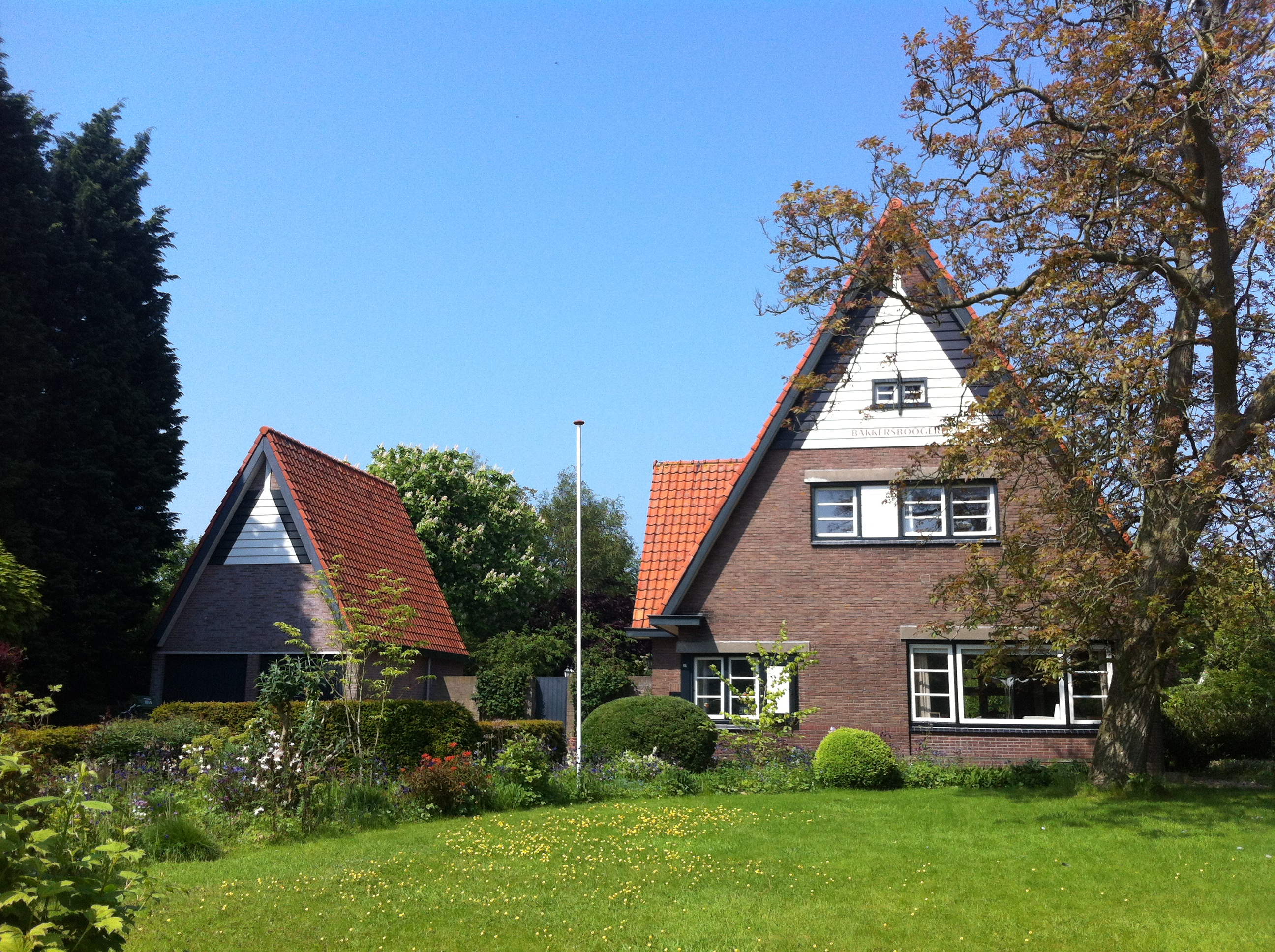
House in Wemeldinge

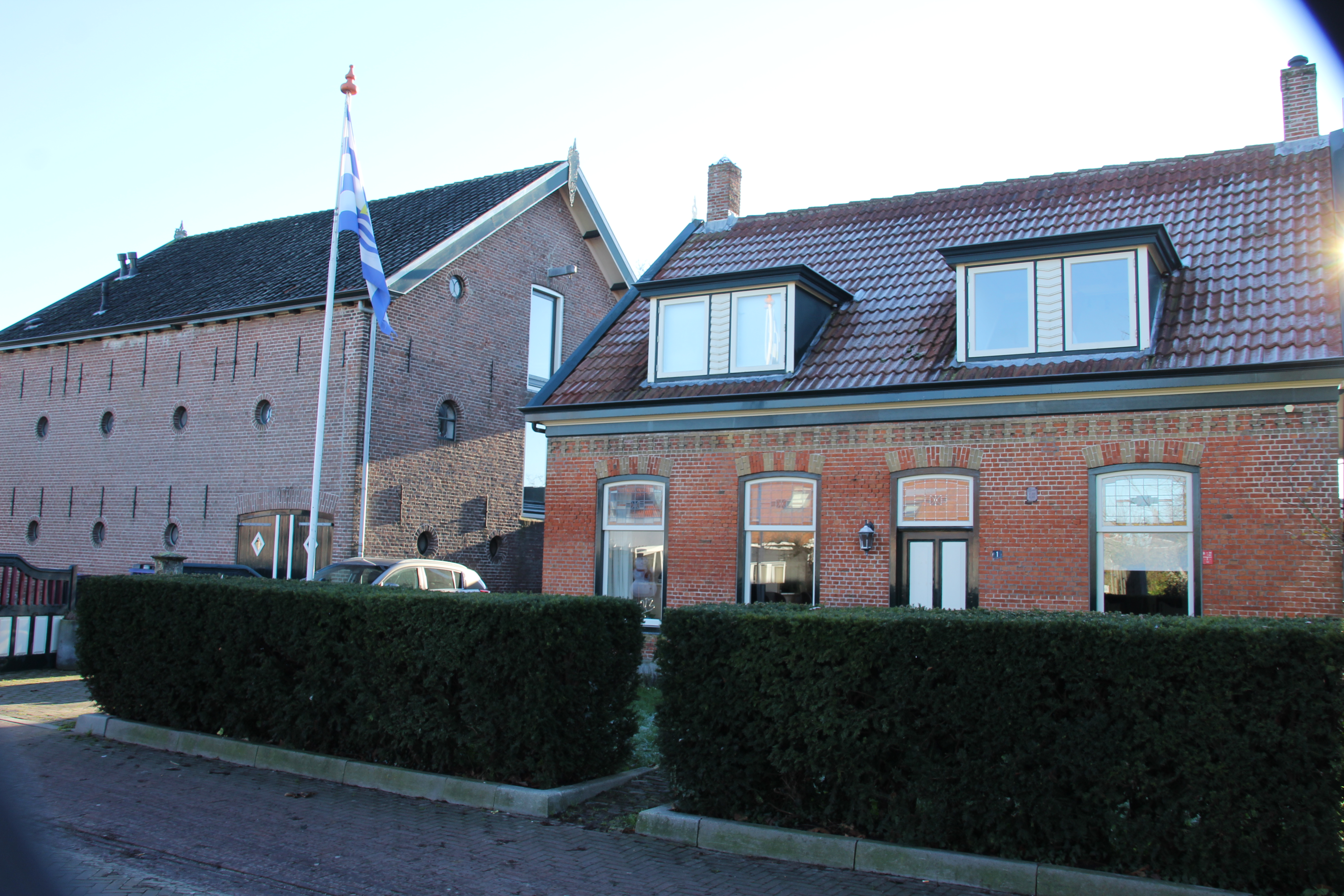
Buildings in Wemeldinge
