= Jan Peter Balkenende =

Prime Minister of the Netherlands from 2002 to 2010

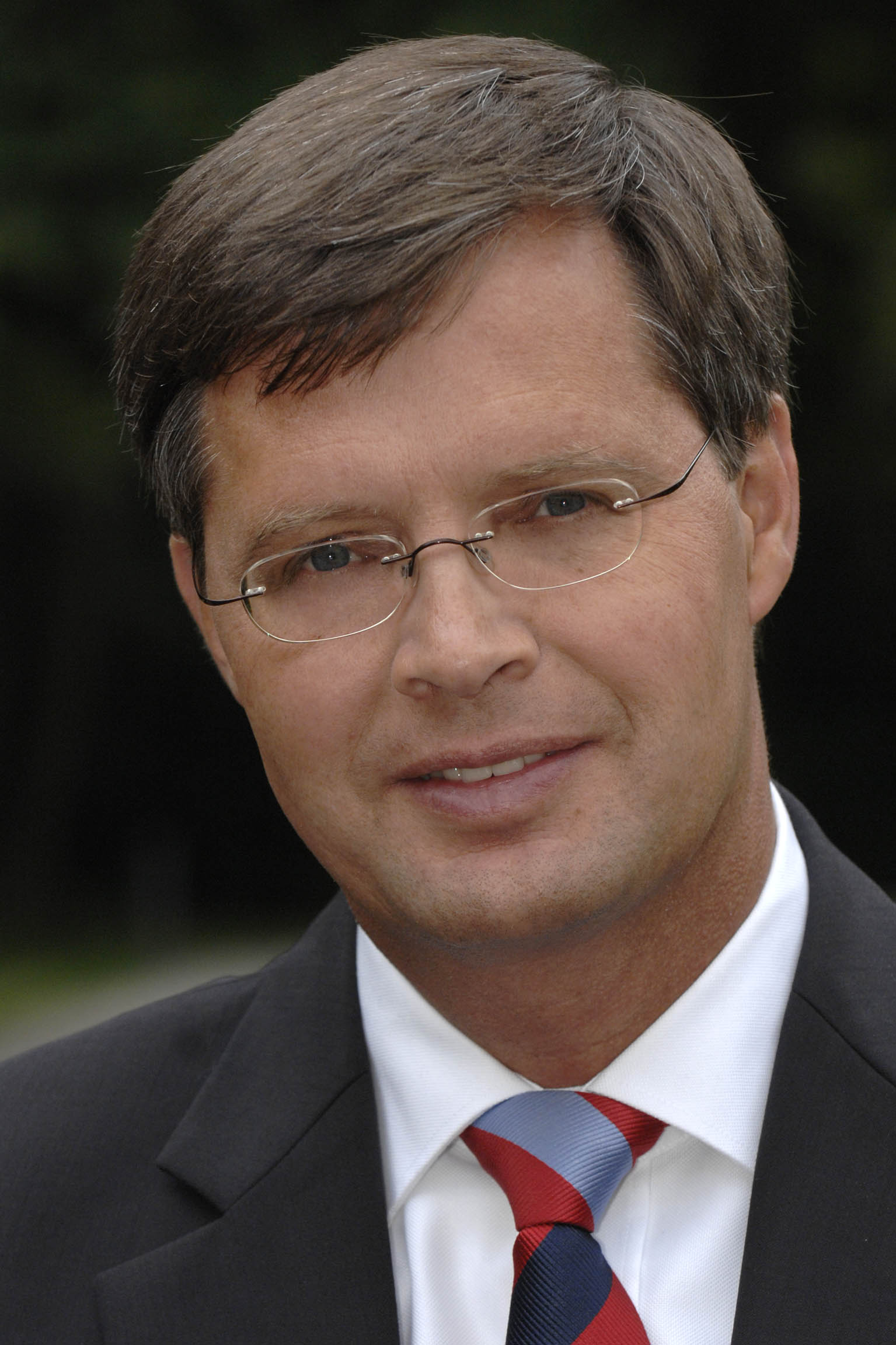
- Official portrait, 2006

Prime Minister of the Netherlands
- In office 22 July 2002 – 14 October 2010
- Monarch: Beatrix
- Deputy: See list: Eduard Bomhoff (2002) Johan Remkes (2002–2003) Roelf de Boer (2002–2003) Gerrit Zalm (2003–2007) Thom de Graaf (2003–2005) Laurens Jan Brinkhorst (2005–2006) Wouter Bos (2007–2010) André Rouvoet (2007–2010)
- Preceded by: Wim Kok
- Succeeded by: Mark Rutte

Leader of the Christian Democratic Appeal
- In office 1 October 2001 – 9 June 2010
- Preceded by: Jaap de Hoop Scheffer
- Succeeded by: Maxime Verhagen

Leader of the Christian Democratic Appeal in the House of Representatives
- In office 30 November 2006 – 9 February 2007
- Preceded by: Maxime Verhagen
- Succeeded by: Maxime Verhagen
- In office 30 January 2003 – 21 May 2003
- Preceded by: Maxime Verhagen
- Succeeded by: Maxime Verhagen
- In office 1 October 2001 – 11 July 2002
- Preceded by: Jaap de Hoop Scheffer
- Succeeded by: Maxime Verhagen

Member of the House of Representatives
- In office 30 November 2006 – 22 February 2007
- In office 30 January 2003 – 27 May 2003
- In office 19 May 1998 – 22 July 2002

Personal details
- Born: Jan Pieter Balkenende Jr. 7 May 1956 (age 70) Biezelinge, Netherlands
- Party: Christian Democratic Appeal (1980–present)
- Spouse: Bianca Hoogendijk (m. 1996)
- Children: 1
- Education: Free University Amsterdam (LLB, BA, LLM, MA, PhD)

Jan Pieter Balkenende Jr. (Dutch pronunciation: [jɑm ˈpeːtər ˈbɑlkənˌɛndə] or [- ˈbɑlkəˌʔɛndə]; born 7 May 1956), commonly known as Jan Peter Balkenende, is a Dutch jurist and politician of the Christian Democratic Appeal (CDA) who served as Prime Minister of the Netherlands from 22 July 2002 to 14 October 2010.

Balkenende studied History and Law at the Free University Amsterdam obtaining Master of Arts and law degrees and worked as a legal counsel for the academic council of his alma mater before finishing his thesis and graduated as a PhD in governmental studies and worked as a professor of Christian theology at his alma mater from April 1993 until May 2002. After the election of 1998, Balkenende was elected as a Member of the House of Representatives on 19 May 1998 and served as a frontbencher and spokesperson for Finances and as deputy parliamentary leader. After Party Leader and Parliamentary leader, Jaap de Hoop Scheffer stepped down before an upcoming election Balkenende announced his candidacy and was selected as his successor on 1 October 2001. For the election of 2002, Balkenende served as lead candidate and after a cabinet formation with the Pim Fortuyn List and the People's Party for Freedom and Democracy formed the Cabinet Balkenende I and became Prime Minister of the Netherlands taking office 22 July 2002.

The cabinet of Balkenende I fell just 87 days into its term. For the election of 2003, Balkenende again served as lead candidate and following a cabinet formation with the People's Party for Freedom and Democracy and Democrats 66, they formed the Cabinet Balkenende II and continued as prime minister. This second cabinet fell on 30 June 2006 and was replaced with the caretaker Cabinet Balkenende III on 7 July 2006. For the election of 2006, Balkenende once again served as lead candidate and following a cabinet formation with Labour Leader Wouter Bos and fellow Christian-democrats, formed the Cabinet Balkenende IV and continued as prime minister for another term. This fourth cabinet fell exactly 3 years into its term. For the election of 2010, Balkenende once again served as lead candidate but suffered a large defeat and announced his retirement and stepped down as Leader on 9 June 2010. Balkenende left office following the installation of the Cabinet Rutte I on 14 October 2010.

Balkenende retired from active politics at 54 and became active in the private sector as a corporate director and also works as a professor of Governance, Institutions and Internationalisation at the Erasmus University Rotterdam since December 2010. During his premiership, his cabinets were responsible for several major reforms to the education system, immigration laws and reducing the deficit following the 2008 financial crisis. He is the fourth longest-serving prime minister after World War II, and his premiership is consistently regarded both by scholars and the public to have been above average. Balkenende was granted the honorary title of Minister of State on 14 October 2022 exactly twelve years after leaving office.

== Early life ==
Jan Pieter Balkenende Jr. was born on 7 May 1956 in Biezelinge in the province of Zeeland in a family belonging to the Reformed faith, the son of Jan Pieter Balkenende Sr. a cereal grains merchant and Thona Johanna Sandee, a teacher.

During his childhood, Balkenende was an active supporter of the Dutch football team PSV Eindhoven, and along with his father, he frequented many matches. He also regularly visited the local music school and theatre. Balkenende went to a Reformed Protestant primary school in Kapelle. He attended secondary school at the "Christian Lyceum for Zeeland" in Goes, graduating in 1974.

He studied at the Vrije Universiteit Amsterdam where he received an MA degree in history in 1980, subsequently an LLM degree in Dutch law in 1982, and finally a PhD in law in 1992.

Balkenende resides with his wife, Bianca Hoogendijk, and his daughter, Amelie, in Capelle aan den IJssel. During his tenure as prime minister, he did not use the Catshuis, the formal residency of the prime minister.

== Early political career ==
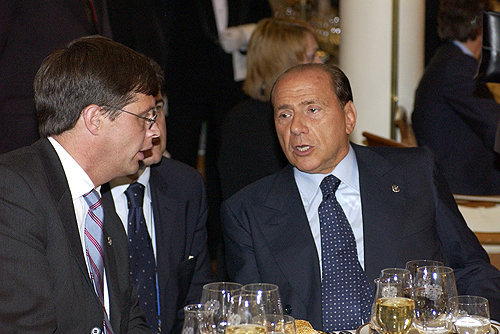
Prime Minister Jan Peter Balkenende and Prime Minister of Italy Silvio Berlusconi in Moscow on 31 May 2003.

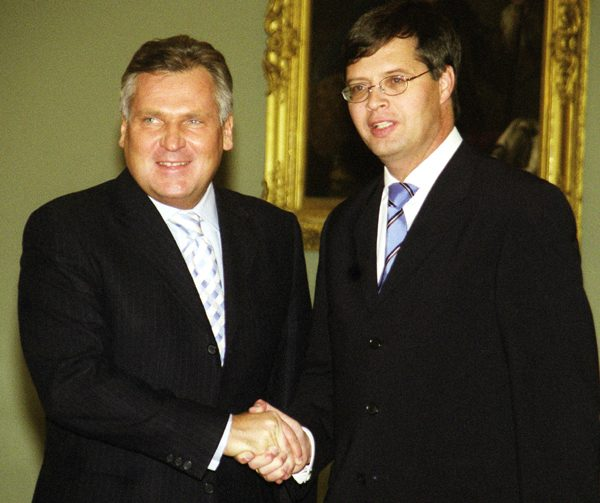
Prime Minister Jan Peter Balkenende and President of Poland Aleksander Kwaśniewski in Warsaw on 27 October 2003.

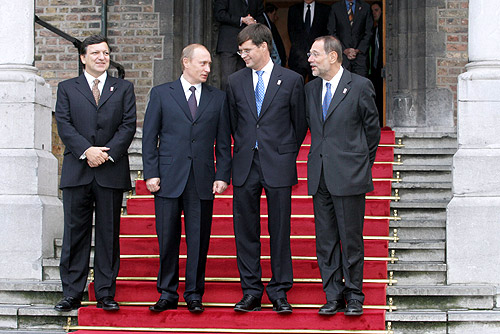
Prime Minister Jan Peter Balkenende with President of Russia Vladimir Putin, President of the European Commission José Manuel Barroso and High Representative for Common Foreign and Security Policy Javier Solana at the EU–Russia Summit in The Hague, 25 November 2004.

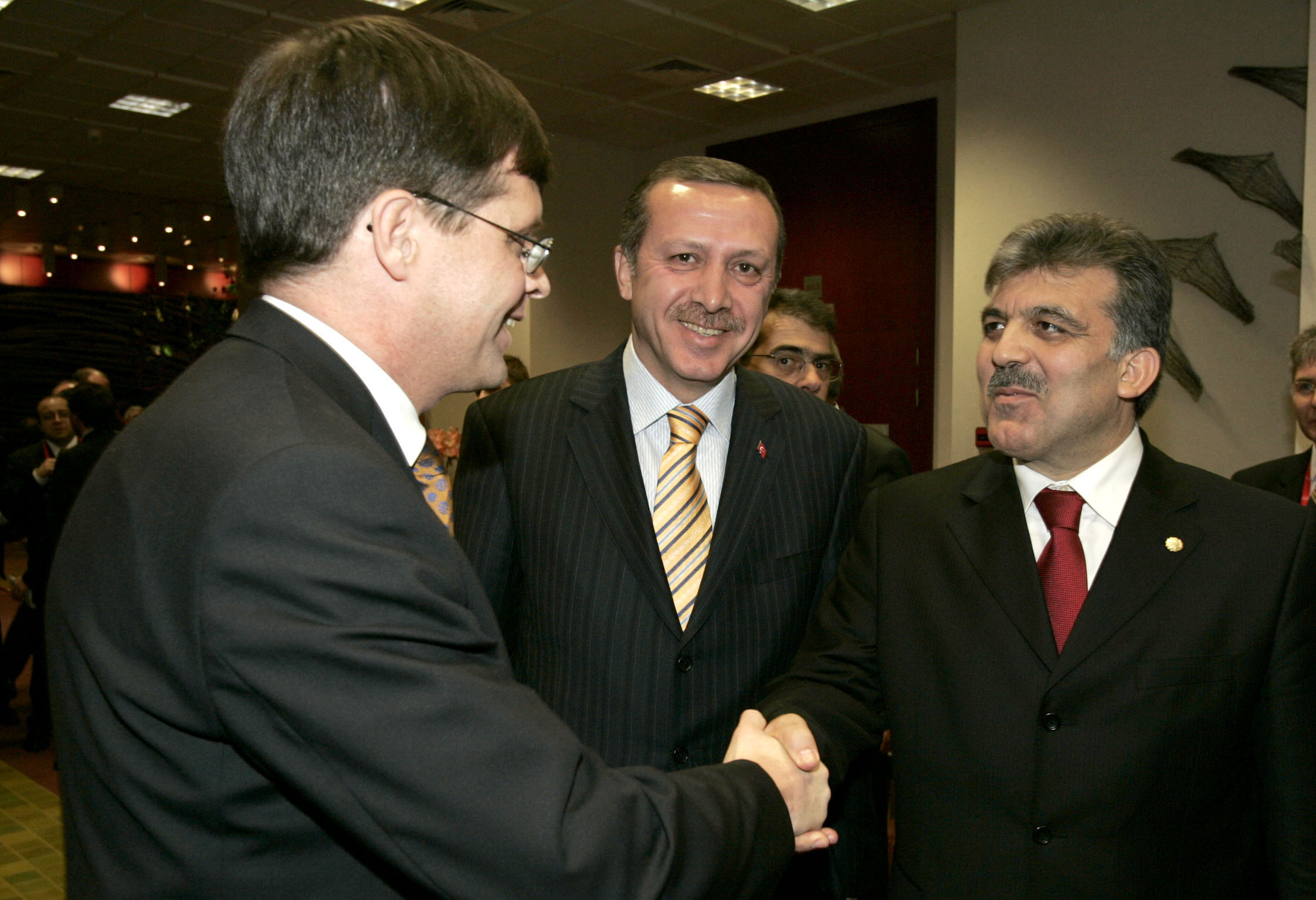
Prime Minister Jan Peter Balkenende and Prime Minister of Turkey Recep Tayyip Erdoğan and Minister of Foreign Affairs Turkey Abdullah Gül in Brussels on 17 December 2004.

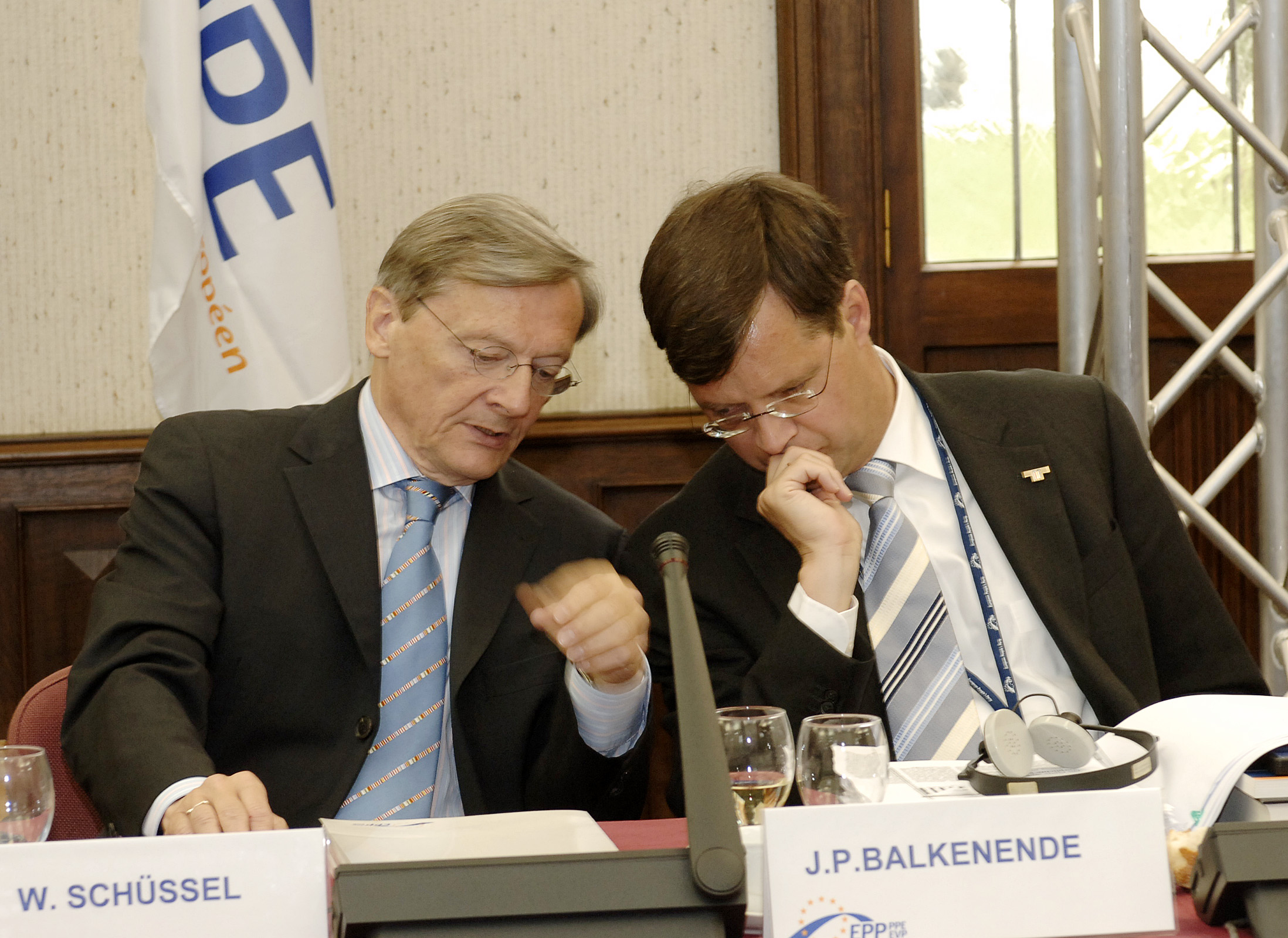
Chancellor of Austria Wolfgang Schüssel and Prime Minister Jan Peter Balkenende at a European People's Party summit in Meise on 15 June 2006.

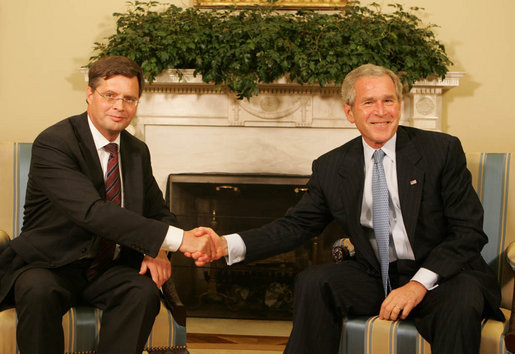
Prime Minister Jan Peter Balkenende and President of the United States George W. Bush in the Oval Office on 5 June 2008.

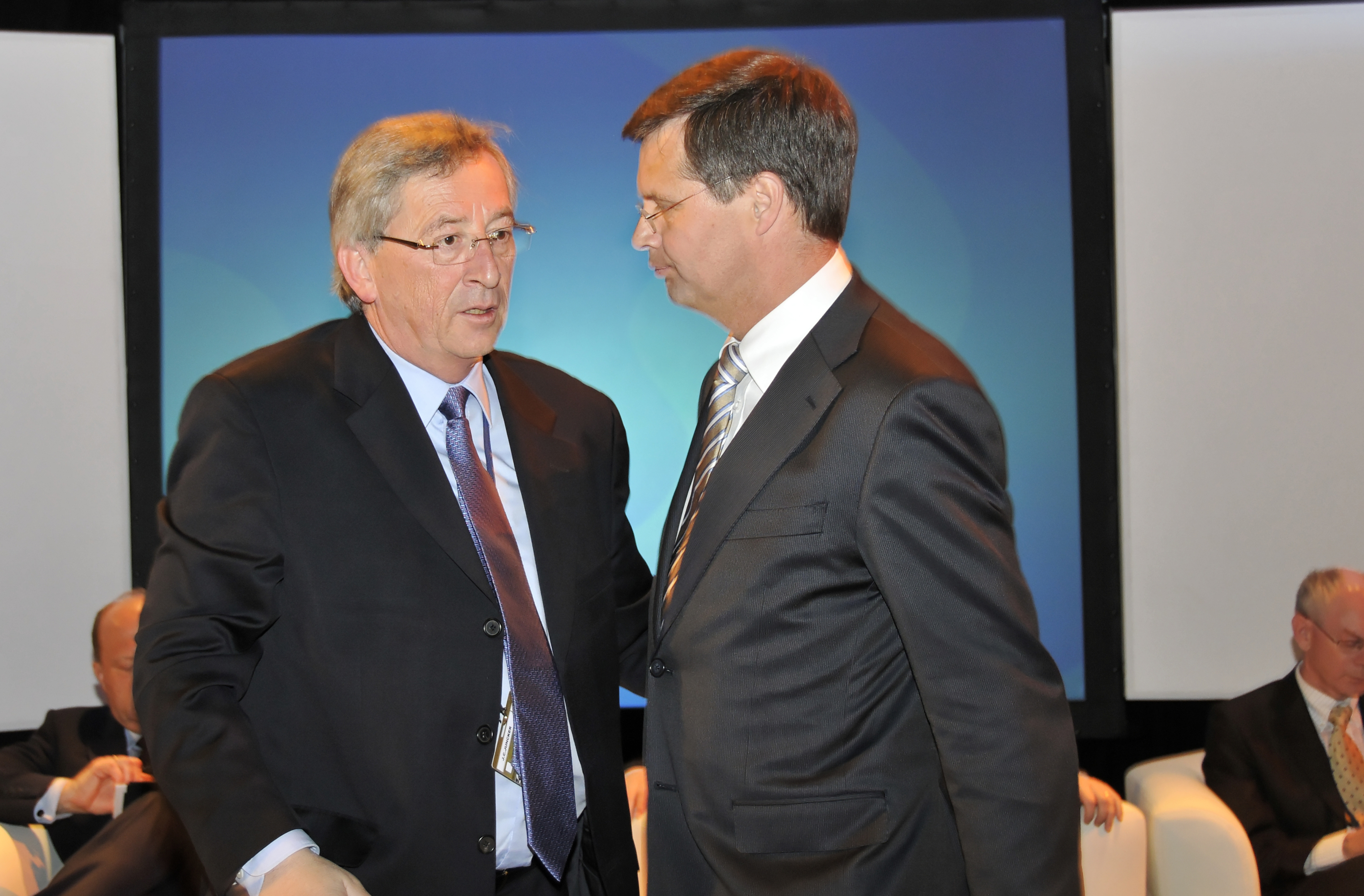
Prime Minister of Luxembourg Jean-Claude Juncker and Prime Minister Jan Peter Balkenende at a European People's Party congress in Warsaw on 29 April 2009.

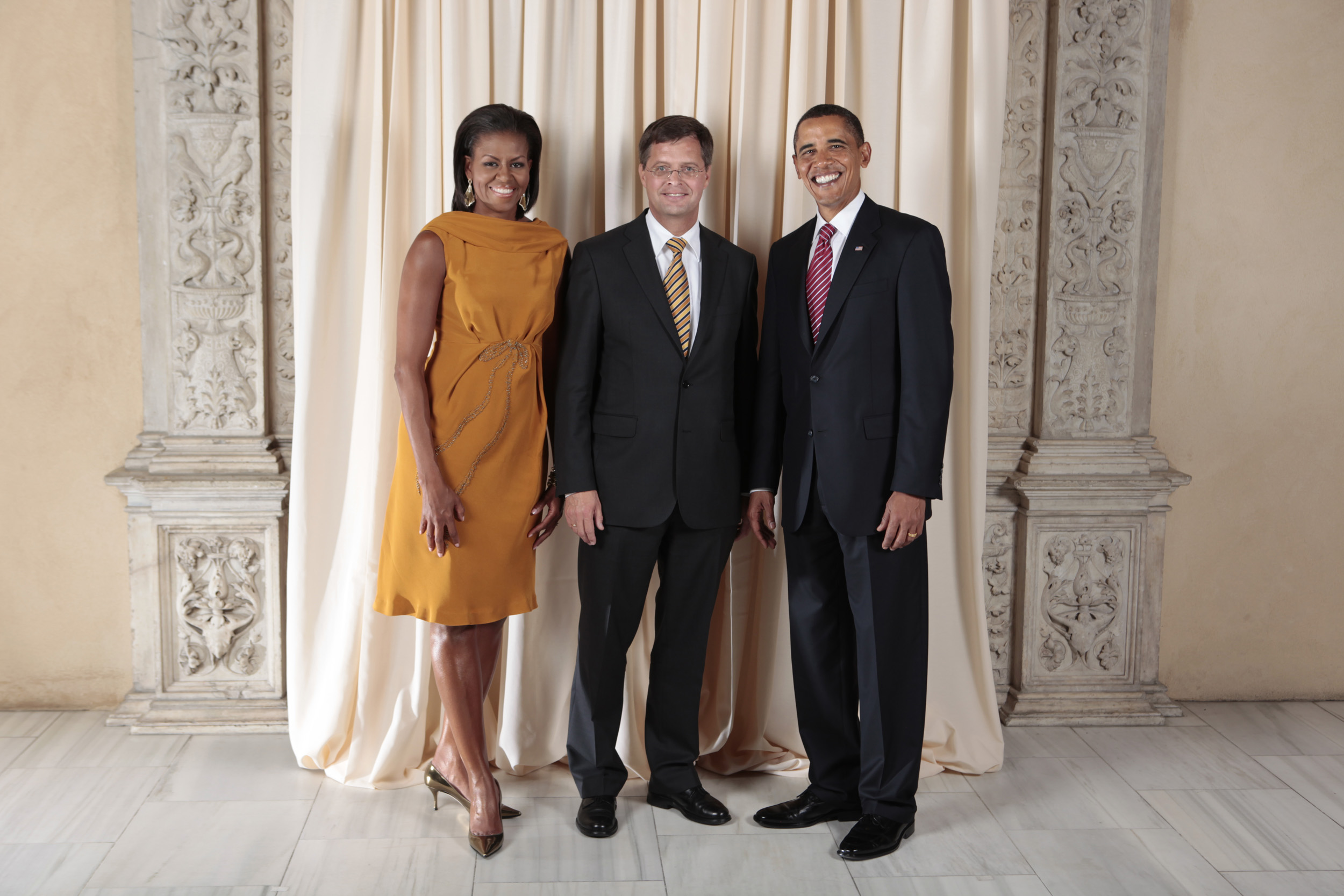
First Lady of the United States Michelle Obama, Prime Minister Jan Peter Balkenende and President of the United States Barack Obama at the Metropolitan Museum of Art on 23 September 2009.

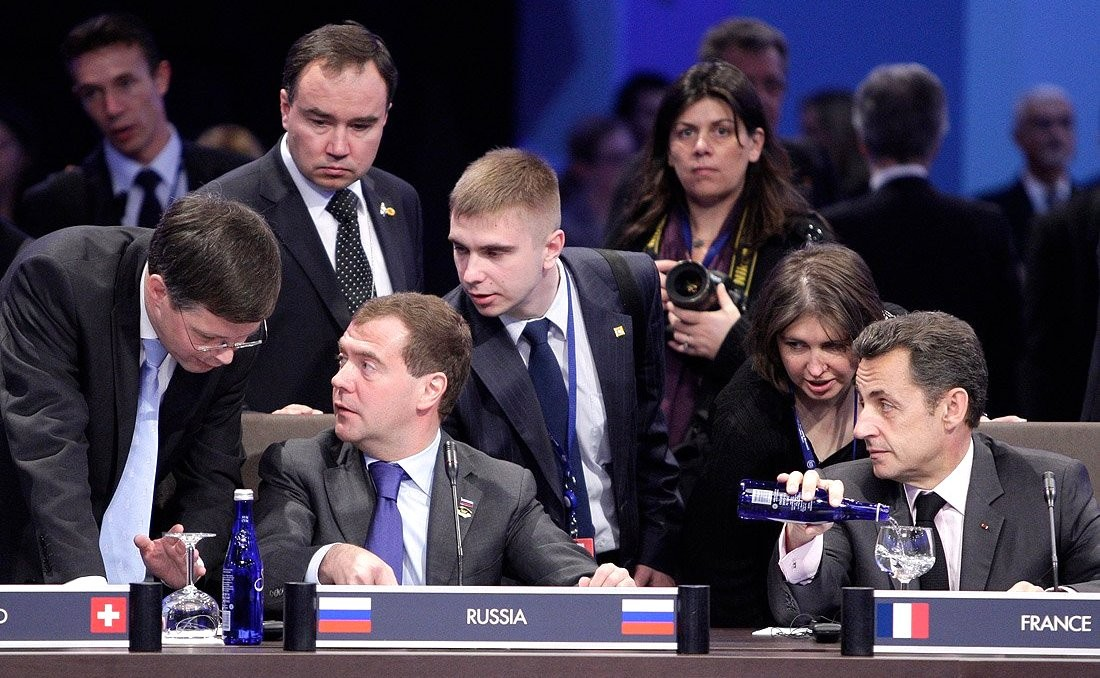
Prime Minister Jan Peter Balkenende, President of Russia Dmitry Medvedev and President of France Nicolas Sarkozy at the 2010 Nuclear Security Summit in Washington, D.C., on 14 April 2010.

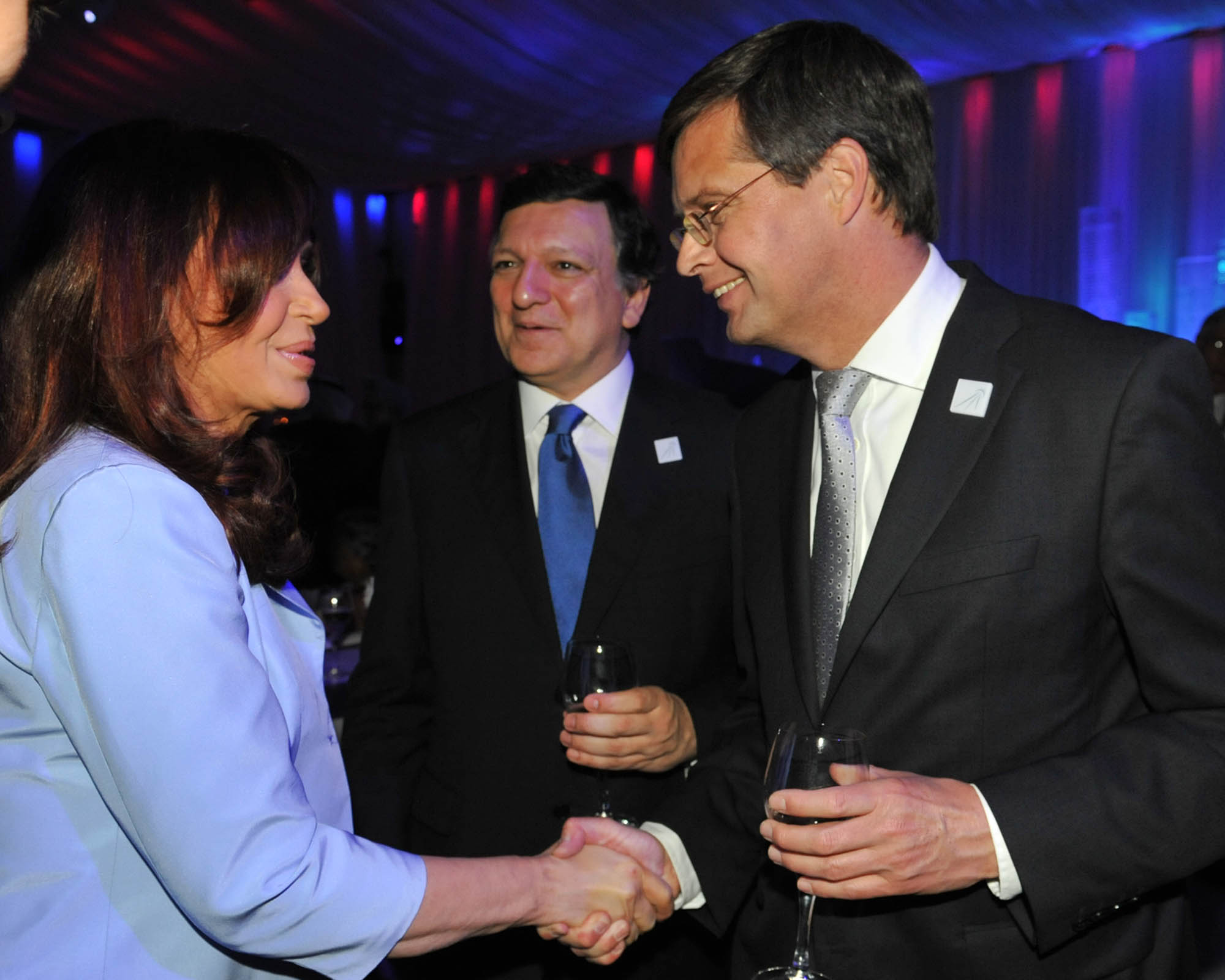
President of Argentina Cristina Fernández de Kirchner, President of the European Commission José Manuel Barroso and Prime Minister Jan Peter Balkenende in Toronto on 10 June 2010.

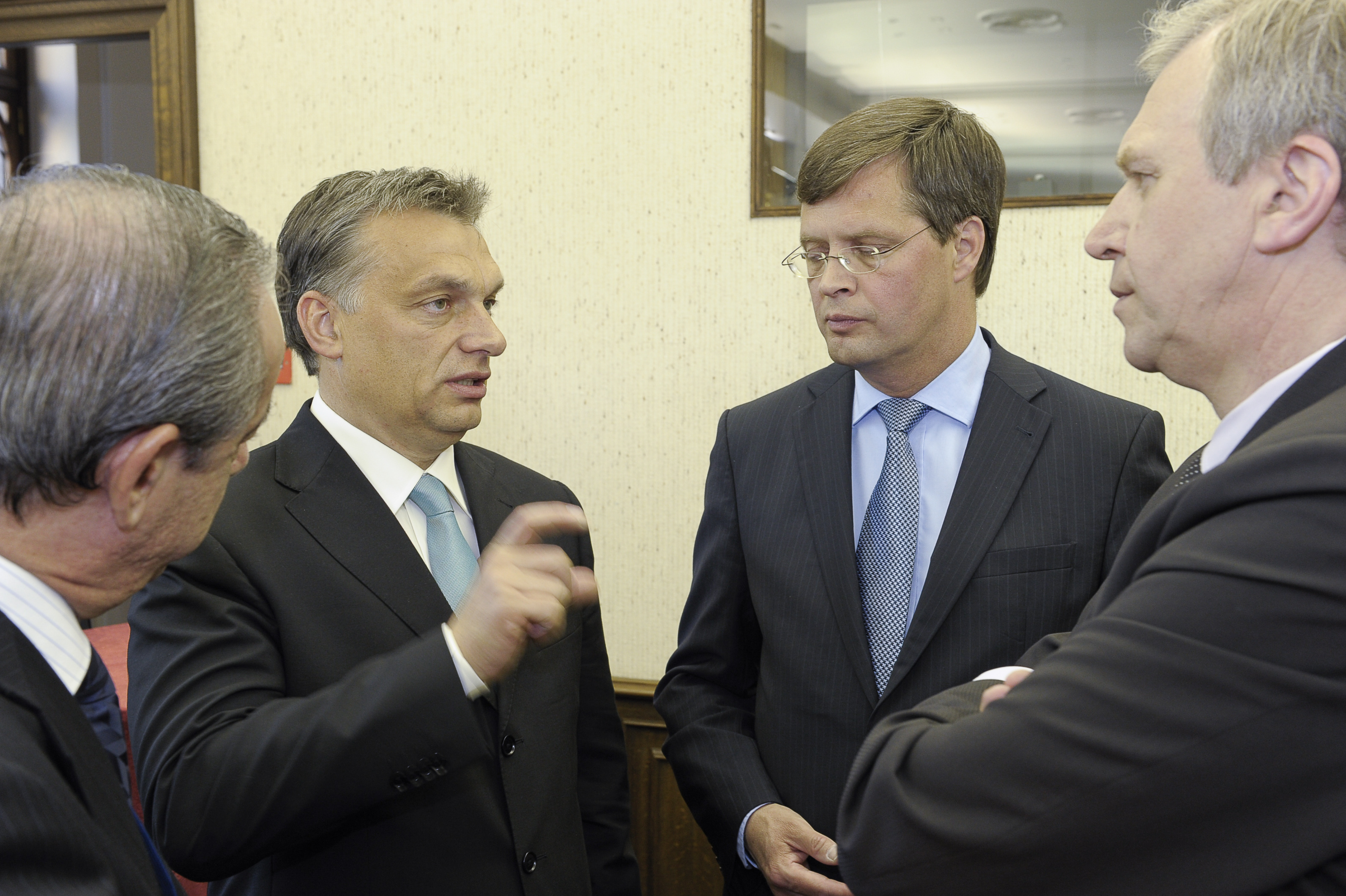
Prime Minister of Hungary Viktor Orbán, Prime Minister Jan Peter Balkenende and Prime Minister of Belgium Yves Leterme European People's Party summit in Meise on 16 June 2010.

He began his career on the staff of the research institute of the CDA and as a city councilman in Amstelveen. As a councilman, he proposed the Krokettenmotie, which gave council members the right to a croquette if the council went past 23:00, and it was passed. In 1992, he received his PhD with a thesis on "Governance regulation and social organisations" (Overheidsregelgeving en maatschappelijke organisaties), which was strongly inspired by the Communitarian ideas of Amitai Etzioni. One year later in 1993, he became an extraordinary professor of Christian-Social Thought at the Free University of Amsterdam.

Balkenende first entered the House of Representatives on 19 May 1998 while the CDA was in opposition. He became the CDA's financial spokesman and was also involved with social affairs, justice, and domestic affairs. In this role, he advocated a substantial reduction of the national debt and sound public finances.

He was elected Chairman of the CDA parliamentary fraction on 1 October 2001, succeeding Jaap de Hoop Scheffer. On 3 November 2001, he was appointed lead candidate for the CDA in the tumultuous May 2002 parliamentary elections. These elections restored the CDA's former position as the largest political party in the House of Representatives.

== Prime Minister of the Netherlands (2002-2010) ==
=== First cabinet ===
On 4 July 2002, Queen Beatrix asked Balkenende to form a new government after the general elections following the resignation of Prime Minister Wim Kok. The coalition cabinet included the Pim Fortuyn List (LPF) party, whose leader (Pim Fortuyn) was assassinated just days before the election. It collapsed after just 87 days in office because of internal conflicts within the LPF that destabilised the government.

=== Second cabinet ===
After early elections in 2003, Balkenende formed his second government with the Christian Democratic Appeal (CDA), the liberal People's Party for Freedom and Democracy (VVD) and the progressive liberal D66. Once again leader of a centre-right coalition, Balkenende's policies centred on reform of the Dutch public services, social security, pre-pension facilities, public health, reducing crime, a tough immigration policy and historically large cuts in public spending. The measures gave rise to large public anger and bad results in opinion polls for his CDA party. While his party remained the largest Dutch delegation in the European Parliament after the European elections, beating the general expectation of a huge loss in parliamentary seats, the party suffered strong losses during Dutch municipal elections of 2006, losing their position as the largest party in many municipalities. Despite his unpopularity among Dutch voters (polls in 2006 showed that only 26–33% of the voters had confidence in him as prime minister), his position as leader of the CDA remained stable. In the beginning of 2006, some CDA members tried to replace Balkenende as leader with Agriculture Minister Cees Veerman. Veerman did not accept the proposition and offered his support to Balkenende. Balkenende's popularity recovered since then, surpassing that of his main competitor Wouter Bos in the autumn of 2006. By then, 53% preferred Balkenende as Prime Minister of the Netherlands while 40% preferred Bos. The switch in public opinion is sometimes explained by the steady recovery of the Dutch economy during the last year of his administration and the positive effects of the reformed policy of the Balkenende cabinet, combined with declining confidence in Bos as a good alternative for the position of prime minister.

On 1 July 2004, Balkenende took up the rotating presidency of the European Union.

=== Third cabinet ===
On 30 June 2006, the Democrats 66, the smallest coalition party, withdrew its support of the government over the way Immigration Minister Rita Verdonk had handled the crisis around the naturalisation of Ayaan Hirsi Ali, a member of the House of Representatives. Balkenende resigned for the second time as Prime Minister of the Netherlands, announced early elections and presented his third government a week later. This rump cabinet, formed of a minority coalition of CDA and VVD, stayed in office until the elections of 22 November 2006.

=== Fourth cabinet ===
Though his old coalition partners, VVD and D66, fared badly in the parliamentary elections of 2006, Balkenende managed to defend the dominant position of his CDA. Needing alternative coalition partners to form a new majority government, he formed a social-Christian coalition with the Labour Party (PvdA) and the orthodox-Protestant Christian Union. The Fourth Balkenende cabinet was formed after Balkenende was appointed formateur by Queen Beatrix on 9 February 2007. His cabinet was announced on 13 February and was scheduled to be in office until 2011, but it fell in the early morning of 20 February 2010 as the result of disagreement between the majority of the parliament and the coalition partners CDA and PvdA over the extension of the Dutch ISAF-mission in Afghanistan. In contrast to the formation of a new caretaker cabinet with full responsibility (Balkenende III after the fall of Balkenende II), Balkenende IV continued as a demissionary cabinet, a caretaker cabinet with limited responsibility. Balkenende government opposed Ukraine and Georgia becoming NATO action plan members at 2008 Bucharest summit. "Ukraine is seen by Russia as part of its own historic and cultural domain," Dutch politician stated.

== 2010 election and resignation ==
Despite serious criticism by former prime ministers from the CDA, Balkenende was the Christian Democratic Appeal lead candidate for the Dutch general election of 2010. Balkenende raised mild controversy during his campaign for the 2010 Dutch elections. While appearing in a television show, Balkenende was asked by a female presenter what parties he would most likely form a coalition with. Balkenende first gave evasive answers, then when asked again by the presenter, responded saying "U kijkt zo lief" (English: "You look so cute"). The comment was regarded as sexist and criticised by several people, including Opzij chief-editor Margriet van der Linden and GroenLinks leader Femke Halsema (who stated that "[the prime minister] deserves a knee to the groin" (in Dutch: "een knietje verdient")). Balkenende apologised for the comment later.

On 9 June 2010, Balkenende resigned his position as leader of the CDA as well as his seat in the newly elected parliament, taking political responsibility for the CDA's disappointing election results in the 2010 general election.

== Post-premiership ==
A 2012 meeting of the Dutch Sustainable Growth Coalition (DSGC), which Balkenende has chaired since its establishment that year.

Balkenende at the 2022 European People's Party Congress in Rotterdam.

After leaving office, Balkenende returned to academia, becoming professor of Governance, Institutions and Internationalisation at Erasmus University Rotterdam in December 2010. In April 2011, he became a partner at Ernst & Young, where his work included international advisory services and corporate responsibility.

In 2012, Balkenende became chairman of the newly established Dutch Sustainable Growth Coalition (DSGC), a coalition of major Dutch companies promoting sustainable business models. The coalition originated from discussions between Balkenende, Paul Polman, then chief executive of Unilever, and Frans van Houten, then chief executive of Philips, at the World Economic Forum in Davos in 2012. He also chairs the Noaber Foundation.

From 2017 to 2021, Balkenende served on the supervisory board of ING. During Balkenende's premiership in 2008, the Dutch government provided €10 billion in state aid to ING during the financial crisis.

In 2021, Balkenende became a member of the Executive Board of the Global Center on Adaptation (GCA). As a board member, Balkenende has participated in GCA's international climate-adaptation activities, including the Africa Adaptation Summit held at its Rotterdam headquarters in September 2022, and in 2023 he joined GCA officials and Rotterdam mayor Ahmed Aboutaleb in welcoming Kenyan president William Ruto for a strategic dialogue ahead of the Africa Climate Summit.

On 14 October 2022, exactly twelve years after leaving office as prime minister, Balkenende was appointed a Minister of State.

== Other issues ==
In 2004, during his second cabinet, Balkenende was diagnosed with necrotising fasciitis. He was treated through surgical debridement and made a full recovery after several weeks in hospital.

On 4 June 2005, the Belgian Minister of Foreign Affairs Karel De Gucht said in the Flemish newspaper Het Laatste Nieuws (The Latest News) that "Balkenende is a mix of Harry Potter and a petty rigid bourgeois mentality". This comparison caused a small diplomatic controversy, and the Belgian ambassador had to apologise to Ben Bot, the Dutch Minister of Foreign Affairs. Retired deputy prime minister Hans Wiegel commented he preferred Harry Potter to Manneken Pis.

Balkenende has a close relationship with the Dutch people from Suriname and the Netherlands Antilles. He has visited several Keti Koti celebrations in recent years.

Balkenende's nicknames were "JP" and "Harry Potter", among others.

He was a member of the Reformed Churches in the Netherlands and, since 1 May 2004, a member of the Protestant Church in the Netherlands.

== Honours and decorations ==
=== National honours ===
- Knight Grand Cross of the Order of Orange-Nassau (23 November 2010)

=== Foreign honours ===
- Belgium: Commander of the Order of Leopold
- Brazil: Grand Cross of the Order of the Southern Cross
- Chile: Grand Cross of the Order of Bernardo O'Higgins
- Germany: Grand Cross of the Order of Merit of the Federal Republic of Germany
- Ghana: Companion of the Order of the Star of Ghana
- (Habsburg monarchy) House of Habsburg: Honorary Knight of the Order of St. George
- Jordan: Grand Cordon of the Order of Independence
- Luxembourg: Grand Cross of the Order of Merit of the Grand Duchy of Luxembourg
- Poland: Grand Cross of the Order of Merit of the Republic of Poland
- Romania: Grand Cross of the Order of the Star of Romania
- Sweden: Commander Grand Cross of the Order of the Polar Star

=== Awards ===
- Golden Honorary Medal, of the municipality Amstelveen (Netherlands, 30 May 1998)

=== Honorary degrees ===
- Honorary doctorate in laws, Hope College (Holland, Michigan, United States, 7 September 2012)
- Honorary doctorate in human letters, Hofstra University (Hempstead, New York, United States, 22 May 2011)
- Honorary doctorate in sociology, Yonsei University (Seoul, South Korea, 27 April 2010)
- Honorary doctorate in systems, design and management, Keio University (Tokyo, Japan, 27 October 2009)
- Honorary doctorate in theology, Károli Gáspár University of the Hungarian Reformed Church (Budapest, Hungary, 10 October 2005)

Party political offices
Preceded by Jaap de Hoop Scheffer	Leader of the Christian Democratic Appeal; 2001–2010	Succeeded by Maxime Verhagen
Preceded by Jaap de Hoop Scheffer	Leader of the Christian Democratic Appeal in the House of Representatives; 2001–2002	Succeeded by Maxime Verhagen
Preceded by Maxime Verhagen	Leader of the Christian Democratic Appeal in the House of Representatives; 2003	Succeeded by Maxime Verhagen
Preceded by Maxime Verhagen	Leader of the Christian Democratic Appeal in the House of Representatives; 2006–2007	Succeeded by Pieter van Geel
Political offices
Preceded by Wim Kok	Prime Minister of the Netherlands; Minister of General Affairs; 2002–2010	Succeeded by Mark Rutte
Records
Preceded by Dries van Agt	Oldest living former Prime Minister of the Netherlands; 2024–present	Incumbent
