= Biezelinge =

- Neighbourhood and former village
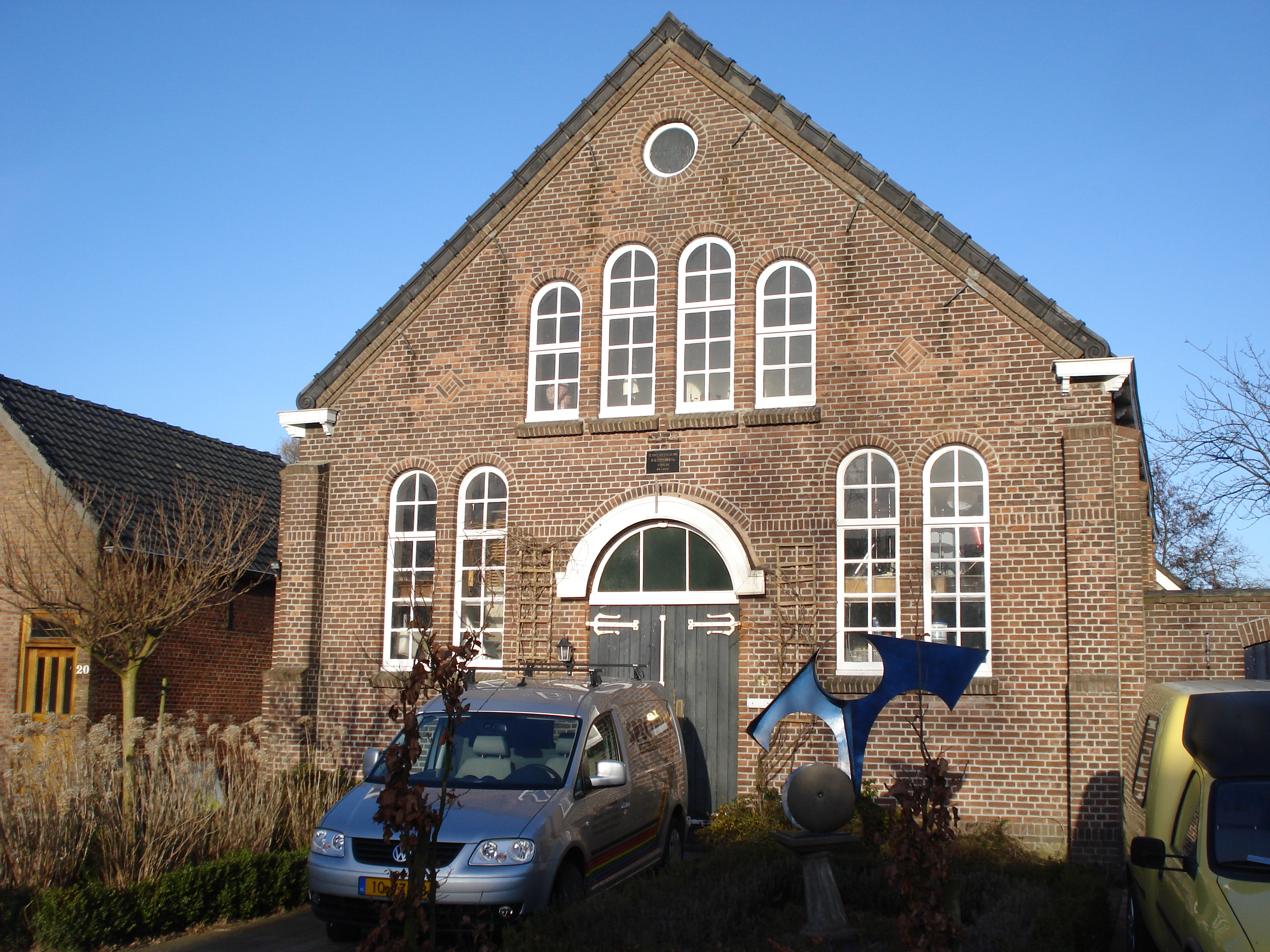
- Biezelinge old 'Nieuwe kerk' (New church)

- Location in the province of Zeeland in the Netherlands Biezelinge (Netherlands)
- Coordinates: 51°29′N 3°58′E
- Country: Netherlands
- Province: Zeeland
- Municipality: Kapelle
- Elevation: 1.6 m (5.2 ft)

Population (2021)
  - Total: 2,350
- Time zone: UTC+1 (CET)
  - Summer (DST): UTC+2 (CEST)
- Postal code: 4421
- Dialing code: 0113

Biezelinge is a neighbourhood of Kapelle and former village in the Dutch municipality of Kapelle (province of Zeeland).

The village is separated from Kapelle by a railroad. The two villages share a train station. In 1978, Biezelinge and Kapelle were considered a single village by the postal authorities. Since 2021, there are no longer specific statistics for Biezelinge.

== History ==
Biezelinge developed in the Late Middle Ages near a harbour. In 1717, the harbour was dammed by the construction of the Schenkeldijk.

The tower Dutch Reformed church was built between 1877 and 1878. In 1908, the medieval church was replaced by an aisleless church. The church is located on the former monastery Jerusalem.

Biezelinge was home to 516 people in 1840.

== Transport ==
Railway station: Kapelle-Biezelinge.

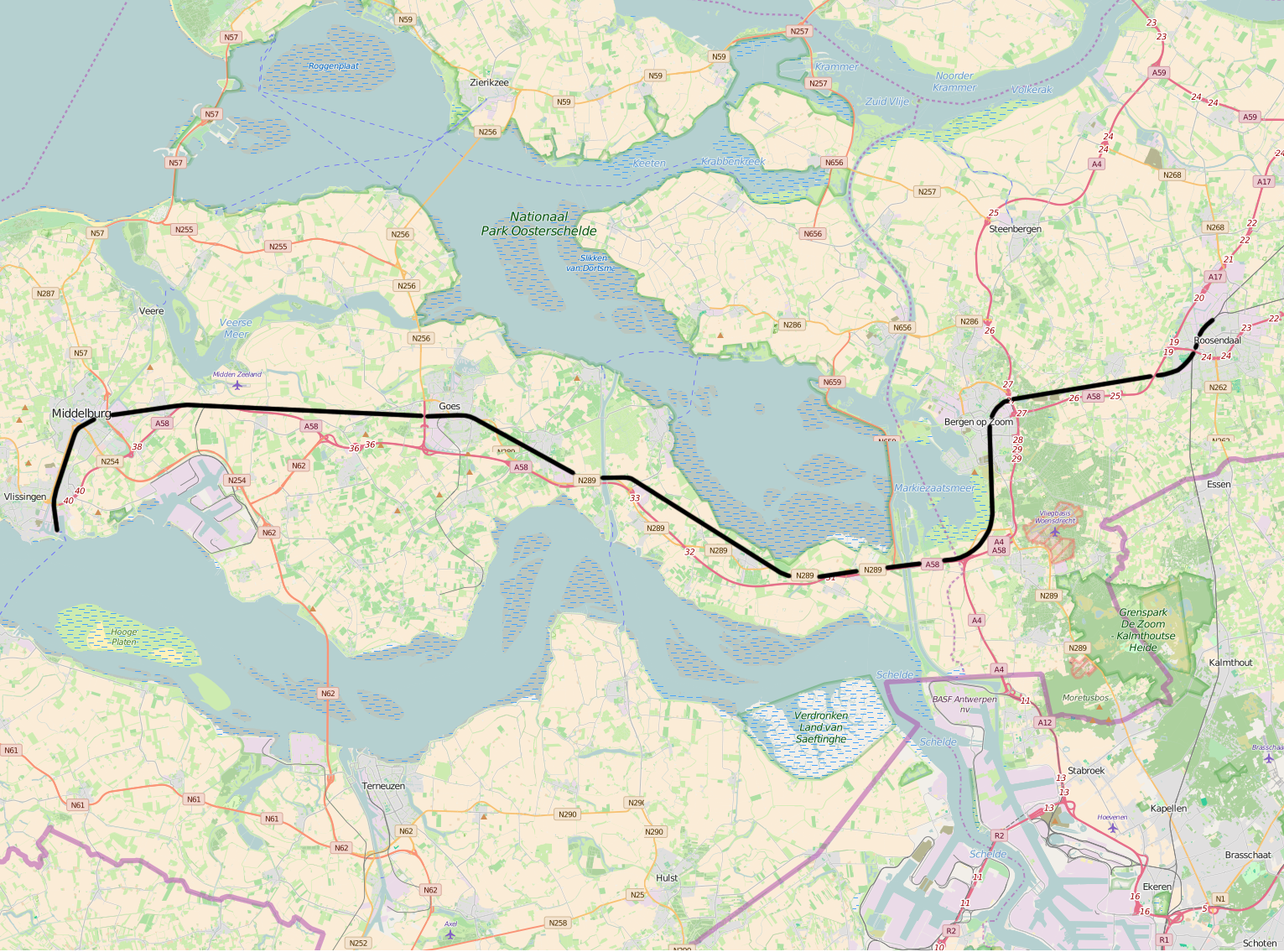

Passenger railway Vlissingen to Roosendaal (part of line 11), with stations (grouped by municipality, bolded), and official station abbreviations:

- **Vlissingen** (vs)
- Vlissingen Souburg (vss)
- **Middelburg** (mdb)
- Arnemuiden (arn)
- **Goes** (gs)
- **Kapelle**-Biezelinge (bzl)
- Kruiningen-Yerseke (krg) (mun. **Reimerswaal**)
- Krabbendijke (kbd)
- Rilland-Bath (rb)
- **Bergen op Zoom** (bgn)
- **Roosendaal** (rsd)

== People from Biezelinge ==
- Jan Peter Balkenende (7 May 1956), Dutch Prime Minister

== Gallery ==
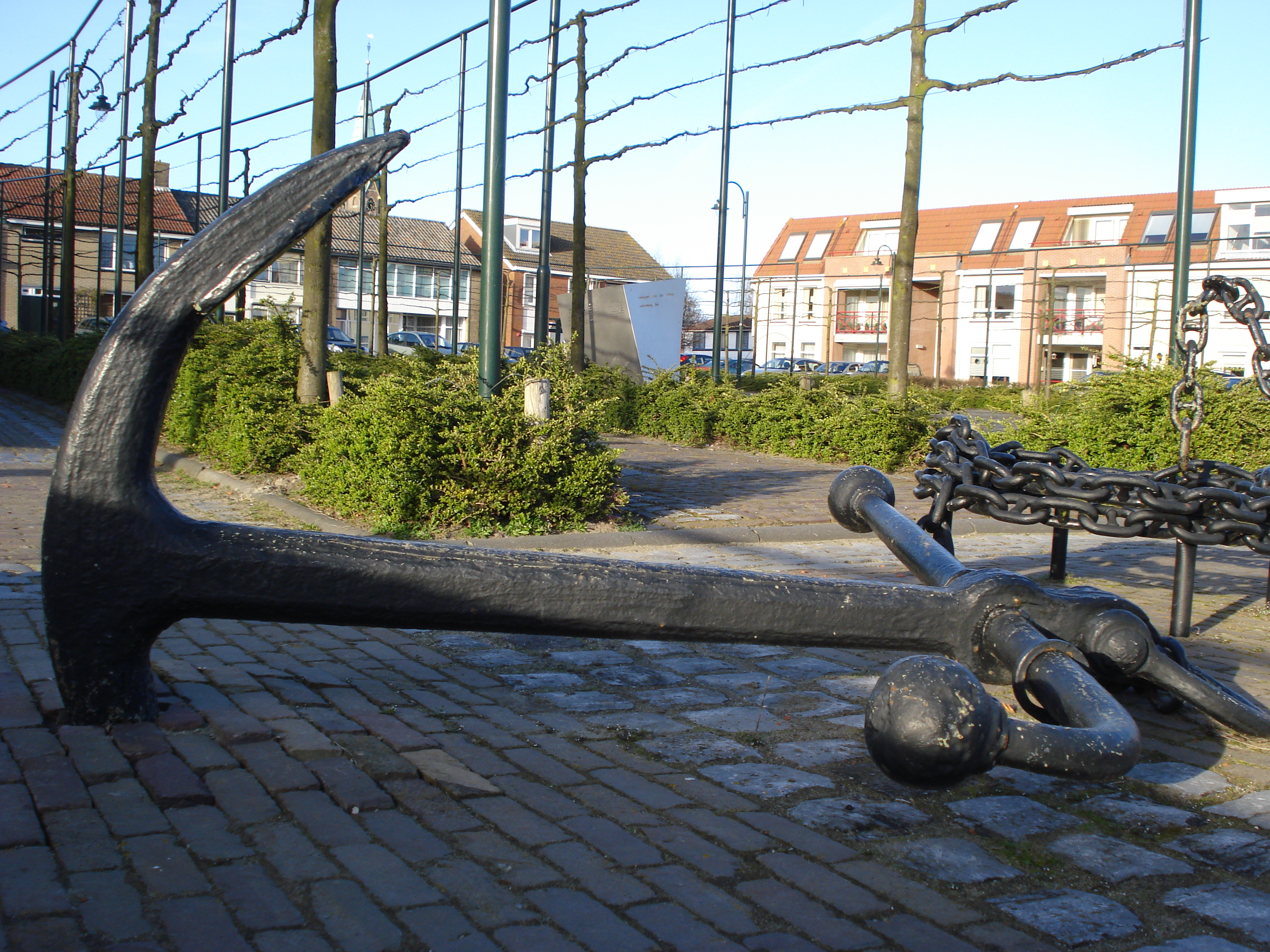
Former location of the port

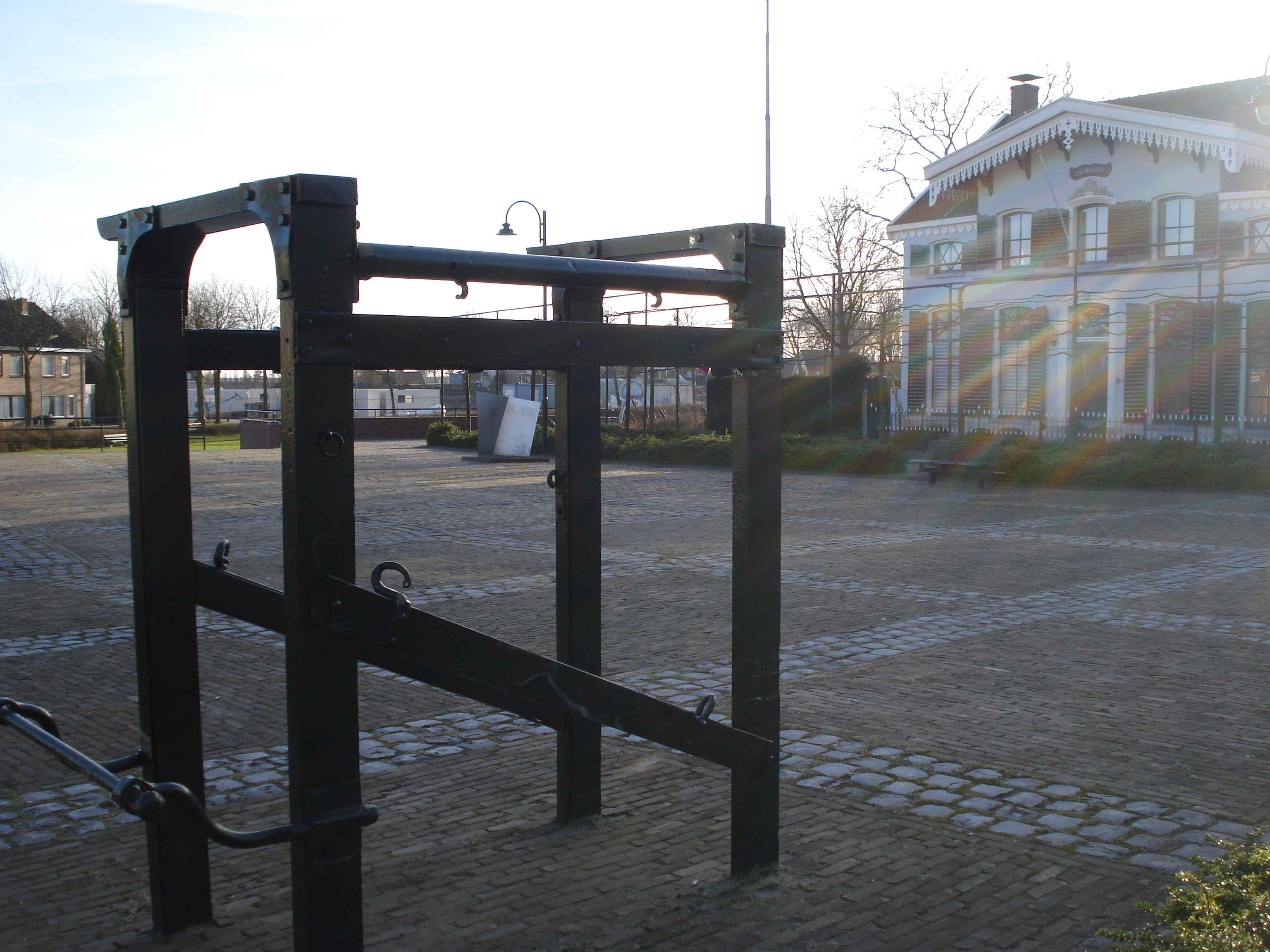
Equipment at the marketplace

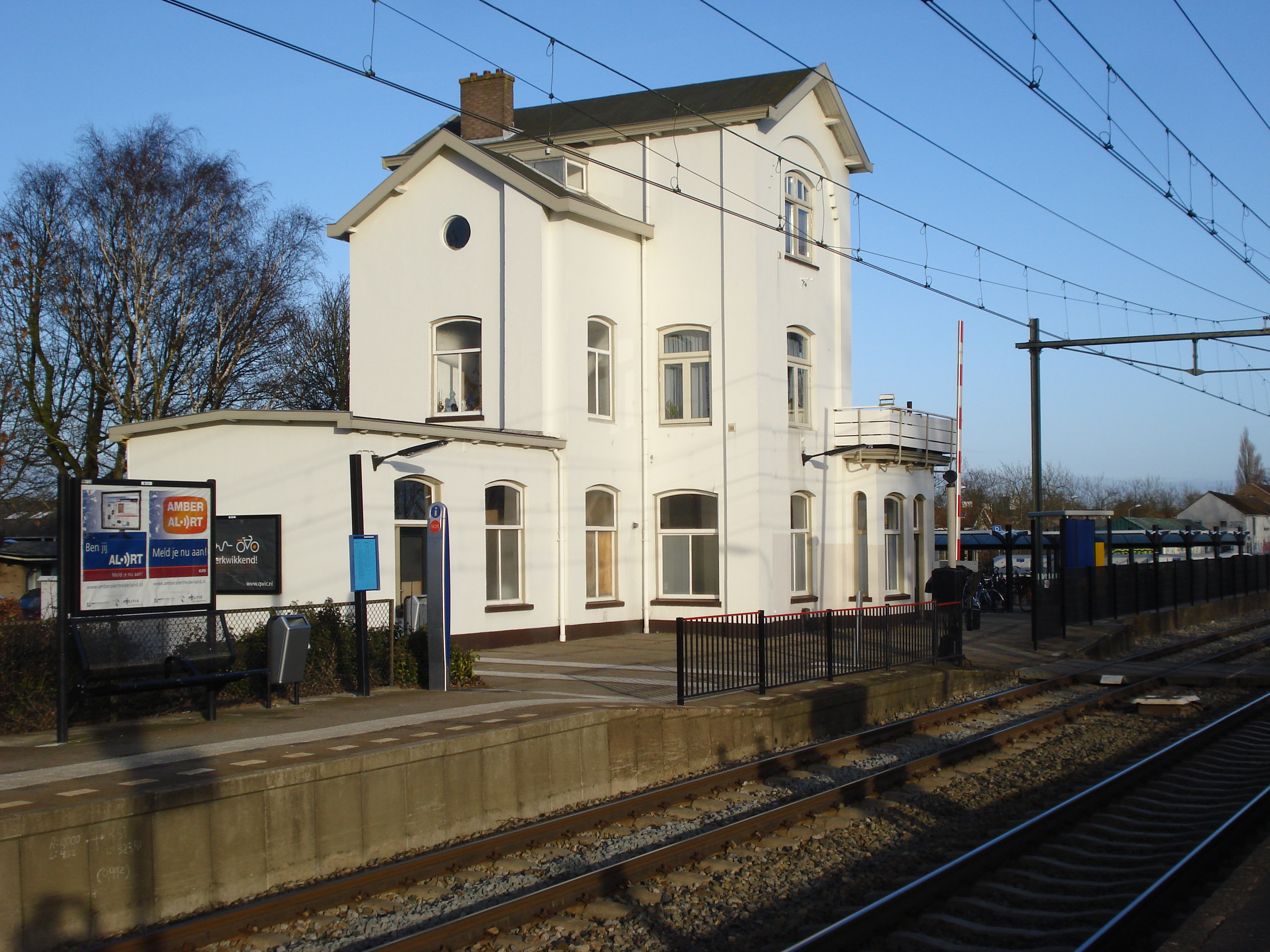
Kapelle-Biezelinge train station
