= Kapelle =

- Municipality
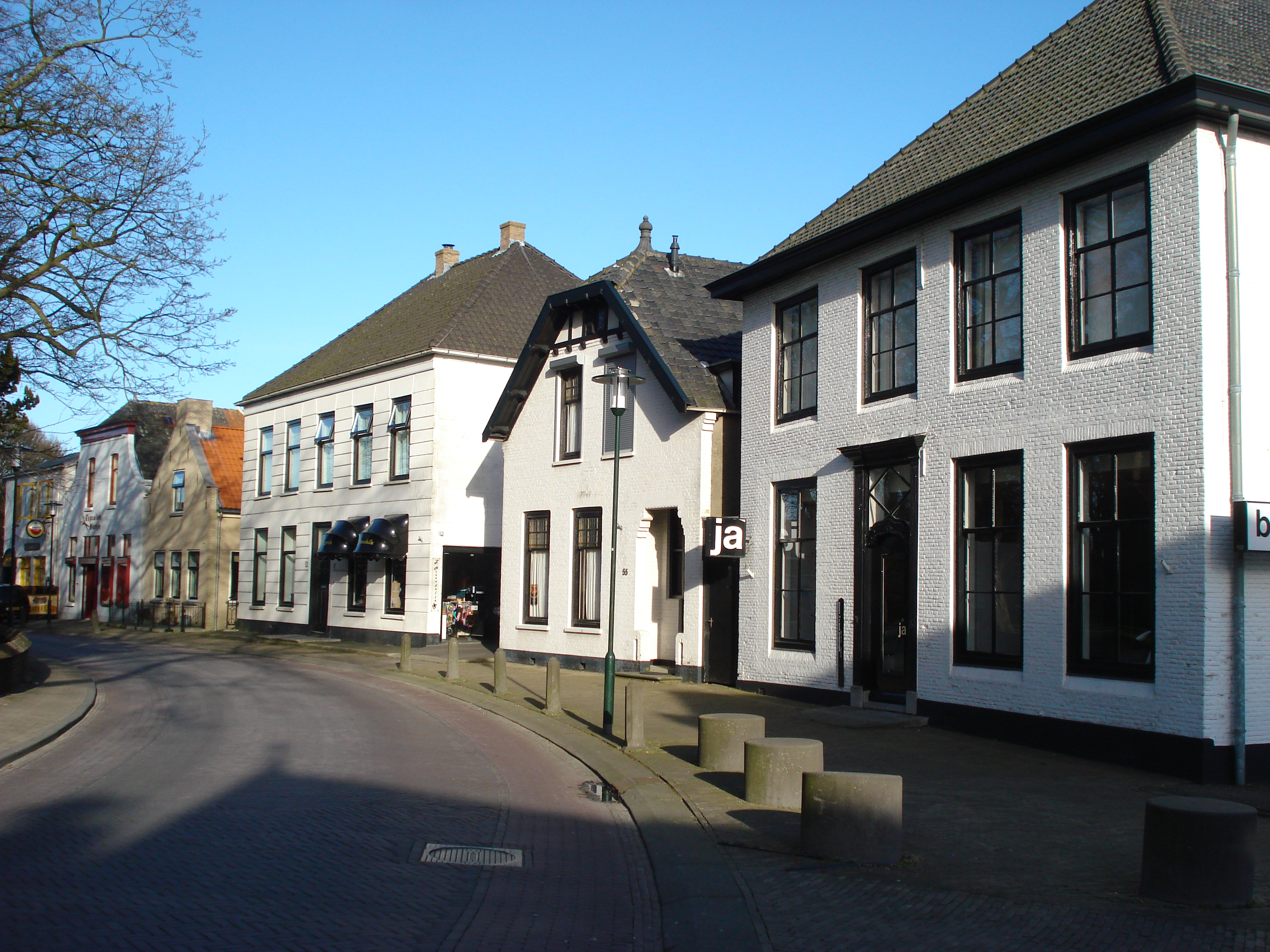
- Kapelle town centre

- Flag Coat of arms

- Location in Zeeland
- Coordinates: 51°29′N 3°57′E
- Country: Netherlands
- Province: Zeeland

Government
  - Body: Municipal council
  - Mayor: Constantijn Jansen op de Haar (PvdA)

Area
  - Total: 49.63 km^{2} (19.16 sq mi)
  - Land: 37.13 km^{2} (14.34 sq mi)
  - Water: 12.50 km^{2} (4.83 sq mi)
- Elevation: 1 m (3.3 ft)

Population (January 2021)
  - Total: 12,882
  - Density: 347/km^{2} (900/sq mi)
- Demonym: Kapellenaar
- Time zone: UTC+1 (CET)
  - Summer (DST): UTC+2 (CEST)
- Postcode: 4420–4429
- Area code: 0113
- Website: www.kapelle.nl

Kapelle (Dutch pronunciation: [kaːˈpɛlə]) is a municipality and a town in the southwestern Netherlands on Zuid-Beveland. In 2023 the municipality's population amounts to 13,051.

== Population centers ==
- Biezelinge
- Eversdijk
- Kapelle
- Schore
- Wemeldinge

=== Topography ===
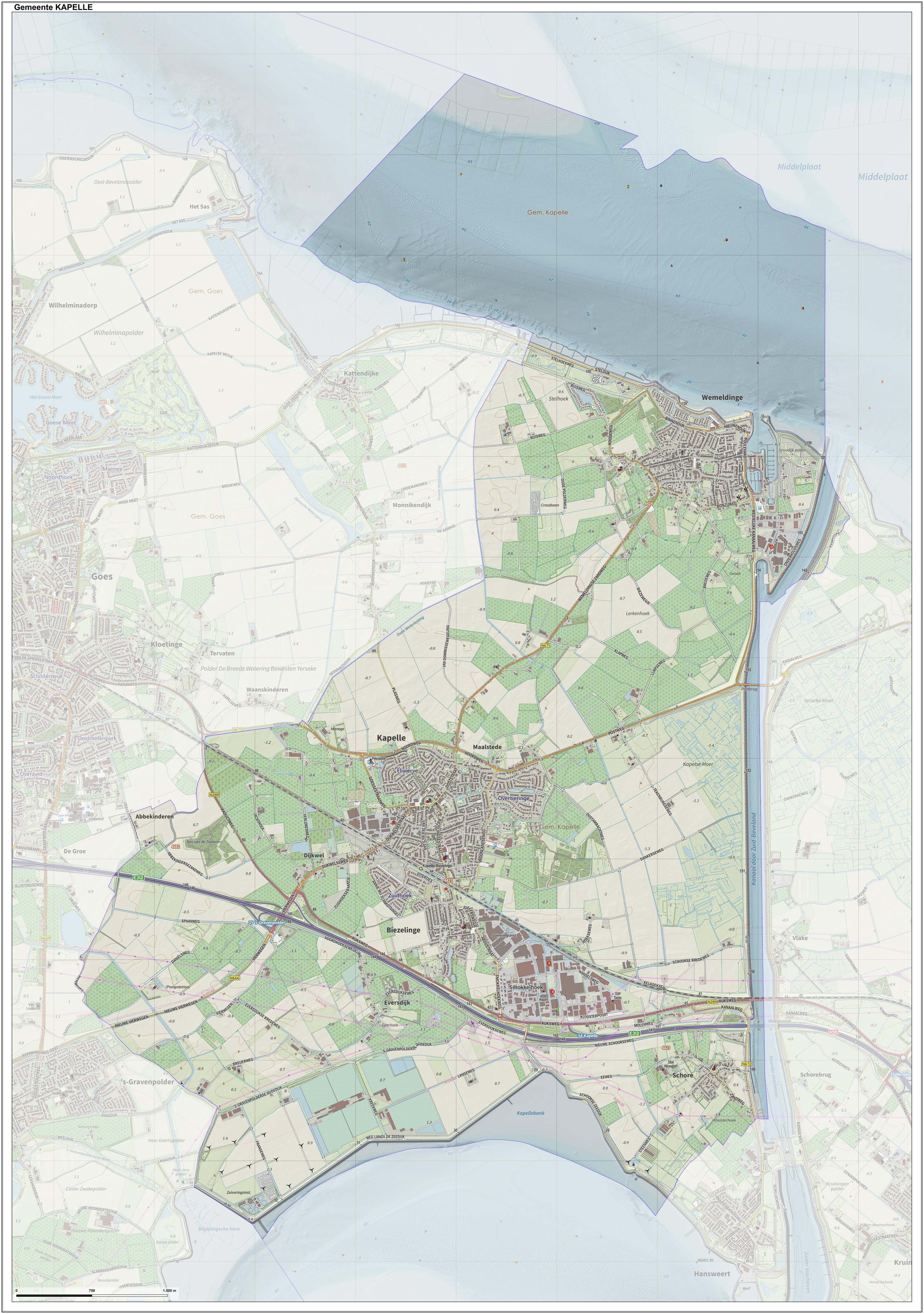

The municipality of Kapelle, June 2015

== Transport ==
- Kapelle-Biezelinge railway station

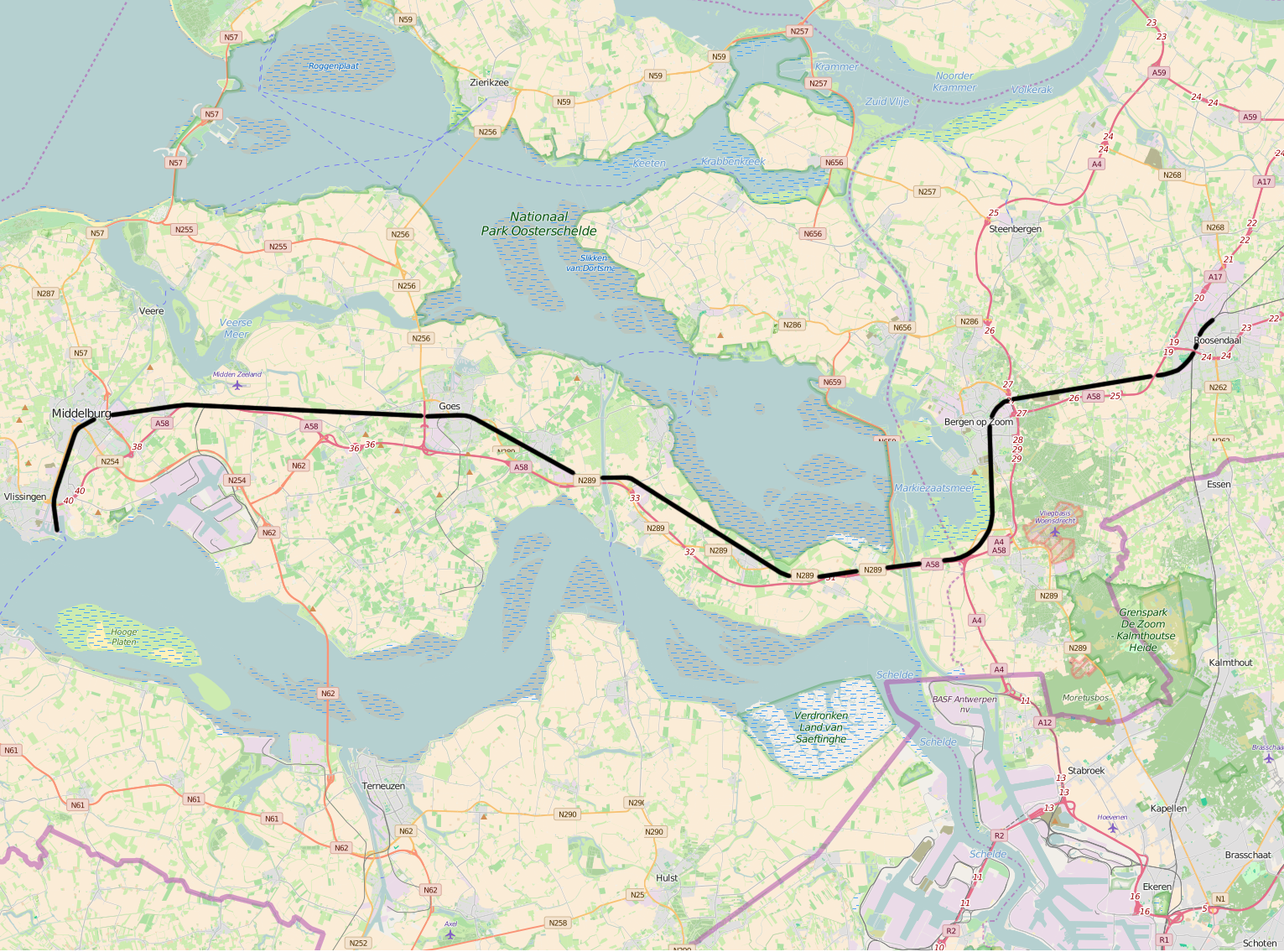

Passenger railway Vlissingen to Roosendaal (part of line 11), with stations (grouped by municipality, bolded), and official station abbreviations:

- **Vlissingen** (vs)
- Vlissingen Souburg (vss)
- **Middelburg** (mdb)
- Arnemuiden (arn)
- **Goes** (gs)
- **Kapelle**-Biezelinge (bzl)
- Kruiningen-Yerseke (krg) (mun. **Reimerswaal**)
- Krabbendijke (kbd)
- Rilland-Bath (rb)
- **Bergen op Zoom** (bgn)
- **Roosendaal** (rsd)

== Famous people ==
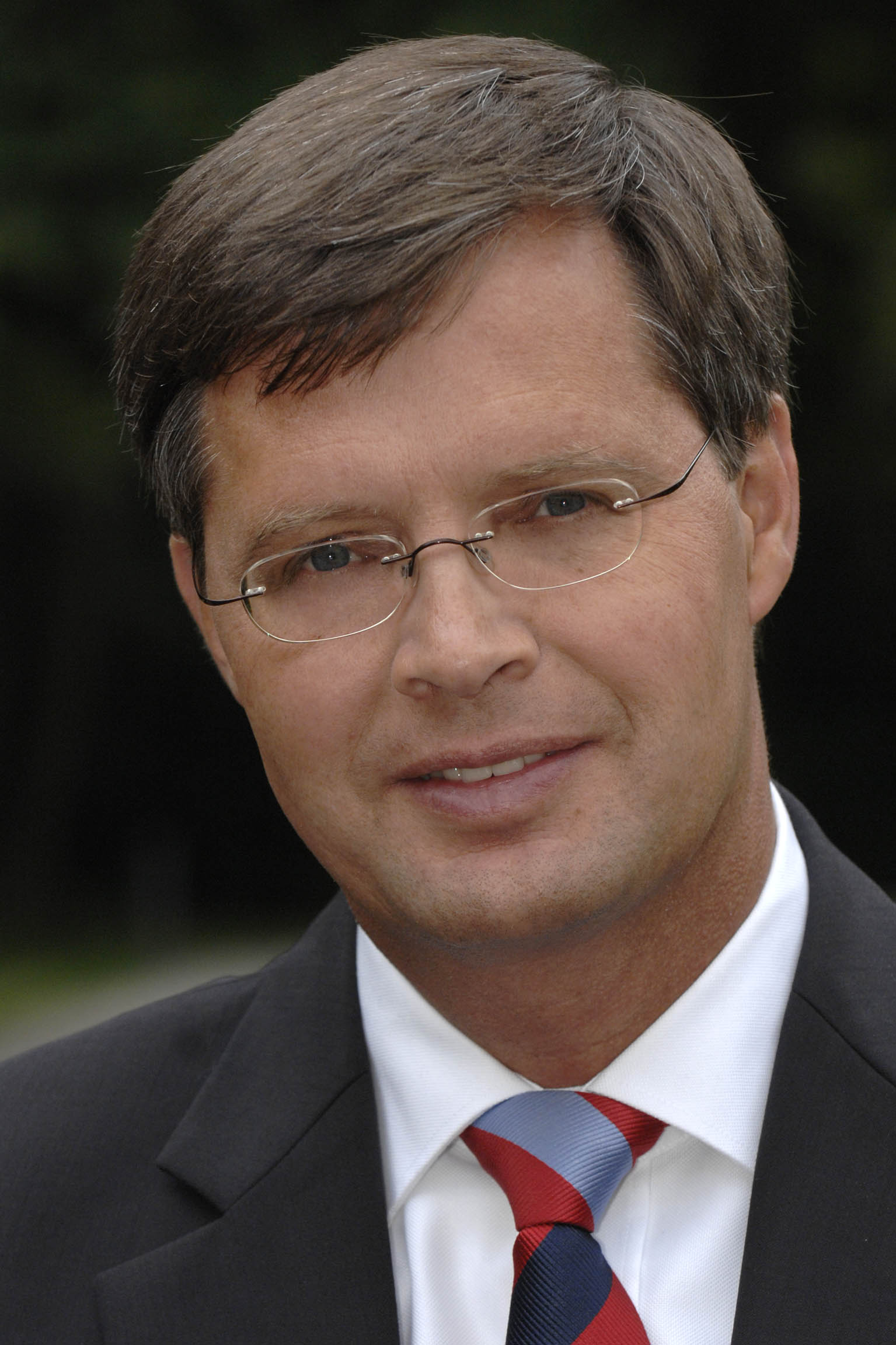
Jan Peter Balkenende, 2006

- Annie M.G. Schmidt (1911 in Kapelle – 1995) a Dutch writer, the mother of the Dutch theatrical song
- Jan Elburg (born 1919 in Wemeldinge – 1992) a Dutch poet
- Jan Peter Balkenende (born 1956 in Biezelinge) a retired politician, Prime Minister of the Netherlands from 2002 to 2010
- Jan Kees de Jager (born 1969 in Kapelle) a retired Dutch politician, former Dutch finance minister

=== Sport ===
- François Marits (1884 in Kapelle – 1945) a Dutch sports shooter, competed at the 1924 Summer Olympics
- Jo de Roo (born 1937 in Schore) a Dutch former professional road racing cyclist
- John Karelse (born 1970 in Wemeldinge) a retired Dutch football goalkeeper with 421 club caps
- Aron Schreuder (born 2000 in Kapelle) a famous Dutch futsal player, Groene Ster Vlissingen

== International relations ==
=== Twin towns — Sister cities ===
Kapelle is twinned with:

- Orry-la-Ville, France

== Gallery ==
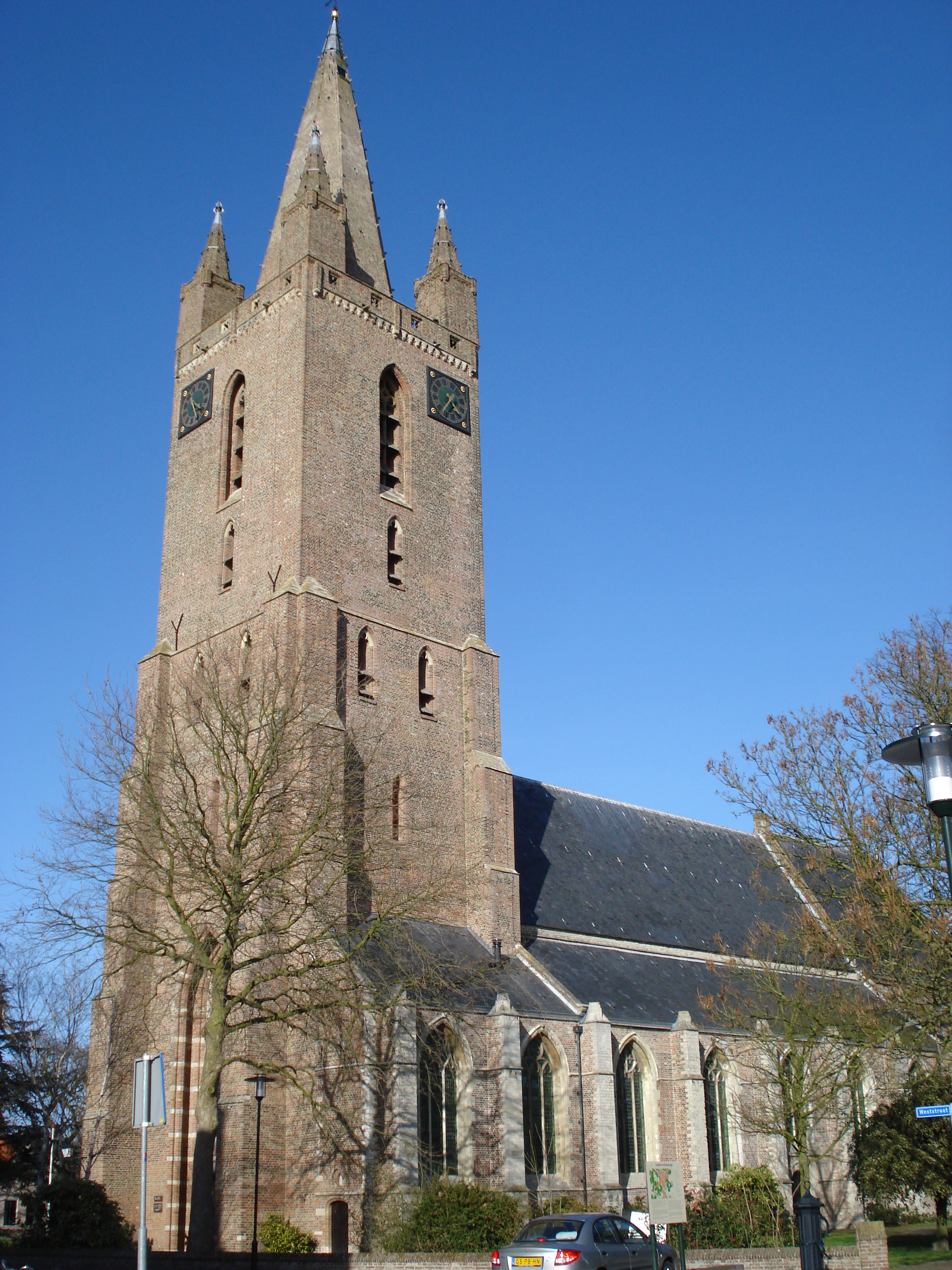
Kapelle, Hervormde kerk, (Dutch Reformed)

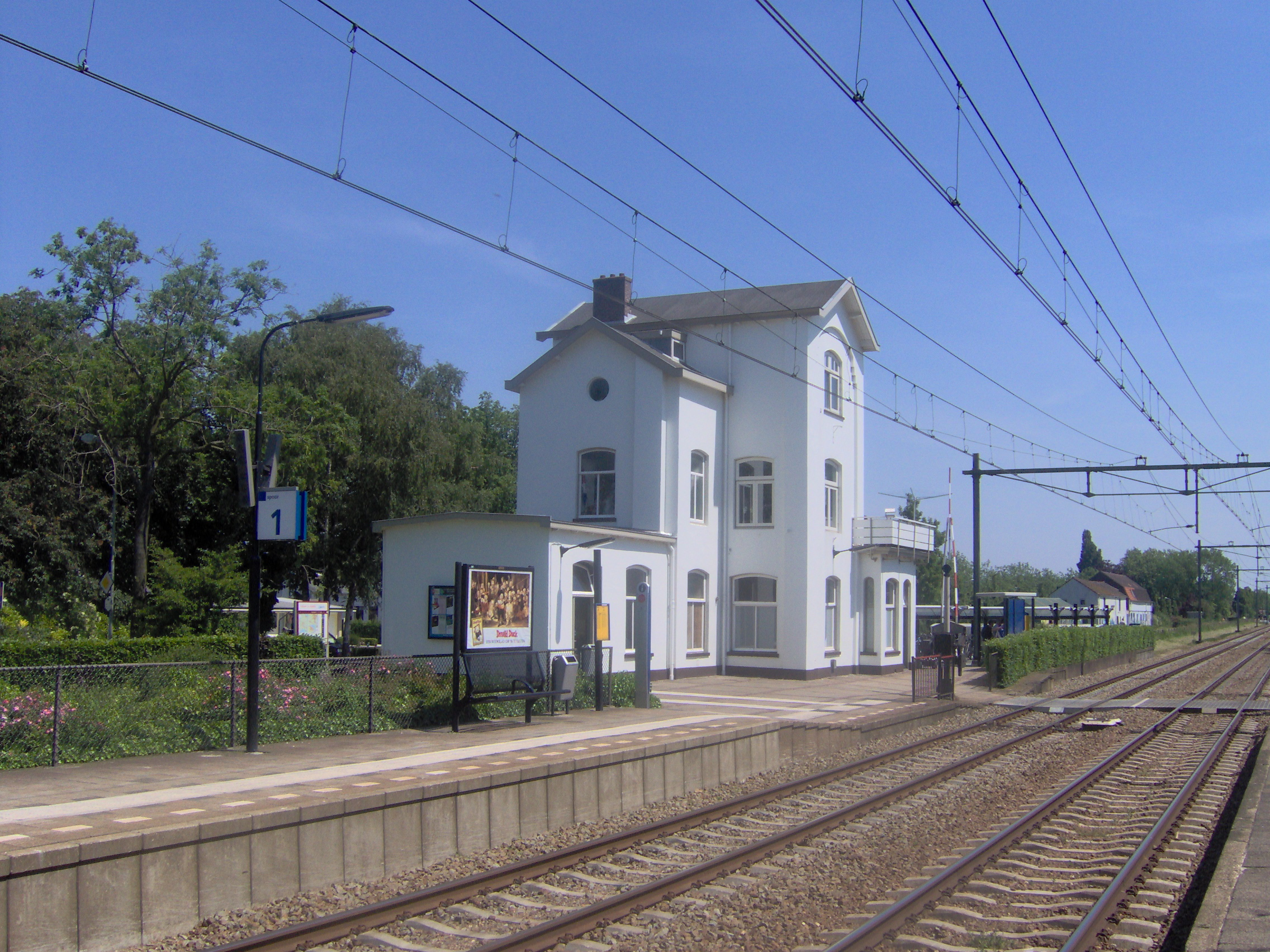
Train station Kapelle-Biezelinge

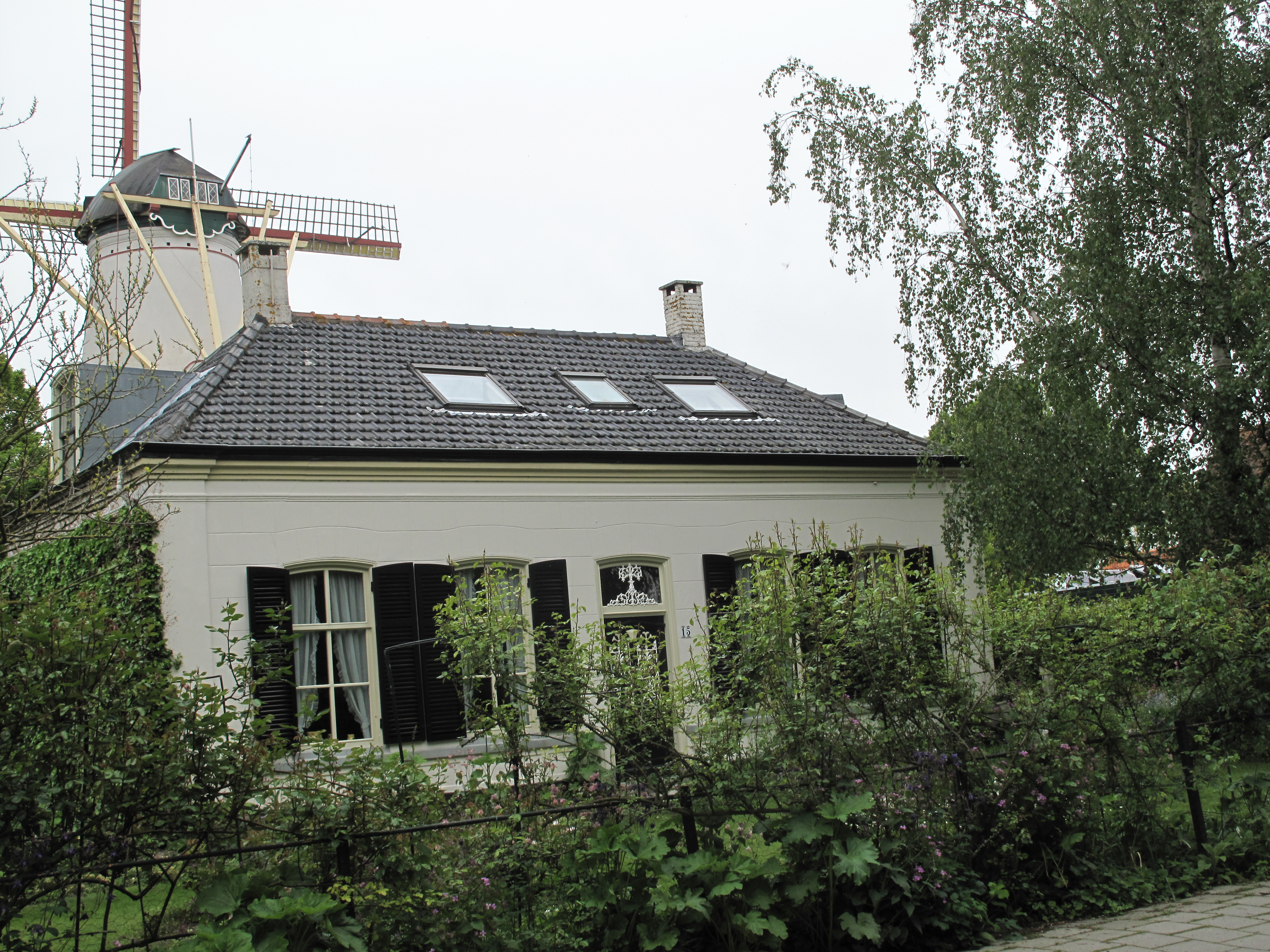
Wemeldinge, monumental house

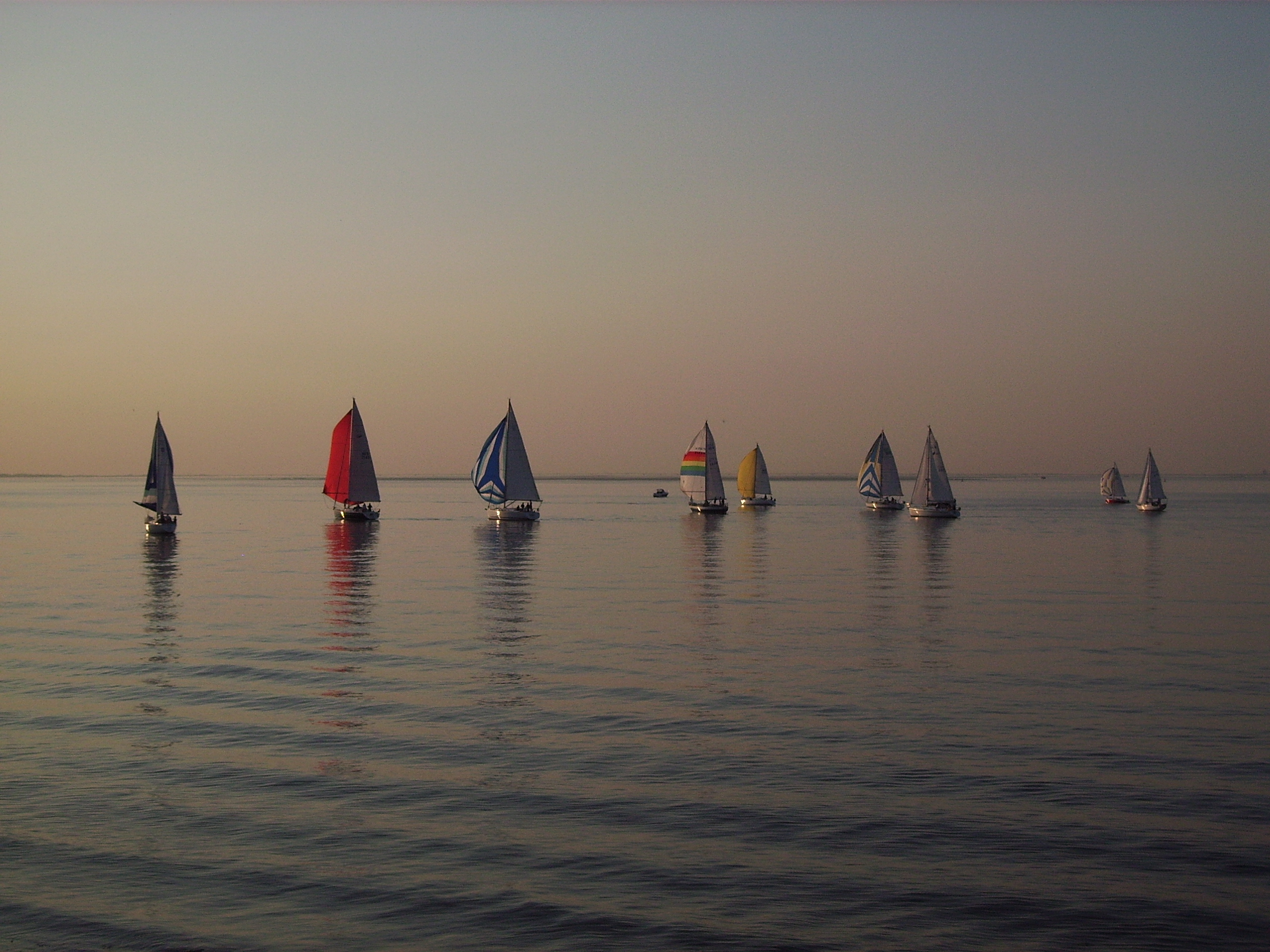
Sailing competition, Wemeldinge
