= List of candidates in the 1994 Dutch general election =

Prior to the 1994 Dutch general election, contesting parties put forward party lists.

== 1: Christian Democratic Appeal ==
Candidate list for Christian Democratic Appeal
Position	Candidate	Votes	Result
1	Elco Brinkman	1,603,088	Elected
2	Yvonne van Rooy	109,364	Elected
3	Ernst Hirsch Ballin	94,570	Elected
4	Wim Deetman	17,807	Elected
5	Enneüs Heerma	5,003	Elected
6	Marian Soutendijk-van Appeldoorn	8,696	Elected
7	Frans Wolters	8,924	Elected
8	Jaap de Hoop Scheffer	2,456	Elected
9	Ad Lansink	2,841	Elected
10	Arie Doelman-Pel	1,564	Elected
11	Piet Bukman	2,572	Elected
12	René van der Linden	20,167	Elected
13	Mieke Boers-Wijnberg	1,256	Elected
14	Vincent van der Burg	505	Elected
15	Marten Beinema	718	Elected
16	Maria van der Hoeven	4,985	Elected
17	Dzsingisz Gabor	1,332	Elected
18	Jacob Reitsma	1,210	Elected
19	Wim Mateman	3,268	Elected
20	Agnes van Ardenne-van der Hoeven	1,399	Elected
21	Ank Bijleveld	1,591	Elected
22	Wim van de Camp	451	Elected
23	Gerrit Terpstra	1,707	Elected
24	Berry Esselink	765	Elected
25	Hans Hillen	657	Elected
26	Gerrit de Jong	298	Elected
27	Nancy Dankers	2,059	Elected
28	Frans Jozef van der Heijden	970	Elected
29	Ries Smits	346	Elected
30	Gerd Leers	1,464	Elected
31	Nel Mulder-van Dam	7,419	Elected
32	Maxime Verhagen	851	Elected
33	Alis Koekkoek	762	Elected
34	Pieter Jan Biesheuvel	955	Elected
35	Anneke Assen	1,111	Replacement
36	Cees Bremmer	319	Replacement
37	Jan ten Hoopen	335	Replacement
38	Theo Meijer	17,066	Replacement
39	Henk de Haan	410	Replacement
40	Marry Visser-van Doorn	473	Replacement
41	Gert Koffeman	1,272	
42	Helmer Koetje	458	
43	Bob Heeringa	380	
44	Hans Huibers	569	
45	Martin van Rooijen	464	
46	Joost van Iersel	156	
47	Minke van der Ploeg-Posthumus	21,010	
48	J. Haeck	679	
49	Riet Roosen-van Pelt	997	
50	J.M.J.C. Scheres	2,931	
51	Ram Ramlal	4,322	
52	Klaasje Eisses-Timmerman	1,618	
53	Léon Frissen	3,772	
54	H.J. Slijkhuis	4,146	
55	Antoinette Vietsch	425	
56	Yvonne Timmerman-Buck	5,491	
57	Joeke Baarda	673	
58	J.P. de Savornin Lohman	420	
59	A.M.J. Rasenberg	559	
60	Asje van Dijk	489	
61	Walter Paulis	542	
62	G.M. Metz	190	
63	Ans Willemse-van der Ploeg	648	
64	Jan de Graaf	203	
65	Frank Kerckhaert	81	
66	Manita Koop	171	
67	T.L.E. Strop-von Meijenfeldt	131	
68	A.A.D. Saman	138	
69	René Paas	439	
70	Annemiek van de Vliet	171	
71	Coşkun Cörüz	1,185	
72	Thea Schiphorst	201	
73	Foka Haitsma	182	
74	Maria Martens	178	
75	Wim van de Donk	124	
76-80	Regional candidates		
Total			

=== Regional candidates ===
Regional candidates for Christian Democratic Appeal
Candidate	Votes	Result	Position per electoral district																
Candidate	Votes	Result	Groningen	Leeuwarden	Assen	Zwolle	Lelystad	Nijmegen	Utrecht	Amsterdam	Haarlem	Den Helder	Den Haag	Rotterdam	Dordrecht	Leiden	Middelburg	Tilburg	Maastricht
Joop Atsma	77			76															
C.J. Baart	19									78									
R.S.J.M. Bakker	25										77								
Ph.J. van Beeck Calkoen	69					77													
W. Beishuizen	20										78								
J.Ch.M. Berkouwer-van der Laan	78															78			
Marja van Bijsterveldt	137						76					80							
Jack Biskop	77																	79	
A.M. Bleeker e.v. Nypels	21									79									
Bas Jan van Bochove	25						77												
Ada Boerma-van Doorne	49		79																
Lucas Bolsius	22													77					
Theo Bovens	534																		80
A.P.M. Brans	5										76								
L.S. Carper	197					80													
F.G.A.M. Cox	6				78														
L.F.M. Cuvelier	52						79	78											
H.H. Danklof	318							80											
G. Dekkers-Postma	142						80	79											
M.G.F. Dierick-van de Ven	93										79								
Willy Doorn-van der Houwen	32													78					
G.H.M. Driessen	360																		76
A.A. Ewoldt-Snijders	35								77										
A.P.J. van der Eyden	27									77									
A.L.J. Flapper	2												77						
Lenny Geluk-Poortvliet	26																77		
L.M.W. Goyen	197																		79
G.J. Hiemstra	35			78															
A. Hoefkens	82																80		
D. Hoekstra	88			77															
Y.R. Hoekstra	35			79															
Edo Hofland	35															77			
Ellen van Hoogdalem-Arkema	55		77																
G.L.M. Huirne-Veelers	41				77														
J.E. Huisman-Troost	152		80																
D. Husselman-Oosterom	42					76													
J.M. de Koning	41															79			
H.H. Koning	44				76														
Pieter Kooijmans	118												80						
W. Koster-Maris	133																		77
S.E.C. Kunst	31													76					
C. Kuyvenhoven-Homburg	176															80			
Frouwke Laning-Boersema	76											79							
L.R.M. Lomans	8												79						
Titia Lont	9												78						
D. Louter	105														78				
M.C. Mertens-Slingerland	236																	77	
H.J. Mes	55														79				
R.A. van Mill	36								78										
G.M. Mohanlal	67												76						
Aart Mosterd	164							76											
A.R. Mungra	74									80									
J.A. van Oostenbrugge	131			80															
J. Piet	244										80								
C.E. van der Plas-Fitzpatrick	94					79													
A.J.M. van Poppel	92																	76	
E.J.P. van Put-Adriaansen	34																78		
IJzebrand Rijzebol	71		78																
J. van Rooijen	59																76		
B.H. Scheffer-Versluis	80								76										
G.W.M. Schreurs	109																	78	
H.J.G. Schroeder	371																		78
M.H.Y. van der Sterre-Groenendal	70						78	77											
T.P. van der Stoep	26															76			
H.J. van de Streek	67								79										
Sjaak van der Tak	57													79					
G.J. ten Thij	78					78													
F.P.A.M. van de Ven-van Lee	602																	80	
A. Verschoor	93				80														
P. Visser	227														80				
Jan de Vries	74														76				
T.G. de Vries	8																79		
K.J. de Vries	44				79														
H.Th.J. Vulto	253								80										
C.V. Weltevreden-van den Bos	46									76									
F.O. van der Werff	42											76							
Wim Wesselink	22											77							
Bert Westerink	128		76																
A.C.M. Willebrands	89													80					
Anne-Marie Worm-de Moel	52											78							
H.M.A.M. van der Zande	160														77				

== 2: Labour Party ==
Candidate list for Labour Party
Position	Candidate	Votes	Result
1	Wim Kok	1,868,410	Elected
2	Jacques Wallage	32,193	Elected
3	Thijs Wöltgens	27,549	Elected
4	Karin Adelmund	60,125	Elected
5	Jan Pronk	26,765	Elected
6	Aad Kosto	5,612	Elected
7	Hans Alders	3,250	Elected, but declined
8	Relus ter Beek	4,129	Elected
9	Rick van der Ploeg	4,530	Elected
10	Tineke Netelenbos-Koomen	5,932	Elected
11	Ad Melkert	797	Elected
12	Willem Vermeend	2,313	Elected
13	Rob Oudkerk	1,102	Elected
14	Saskia Noorman-den Uyl	13,371	Elected
15	Ruud Vreeman	780	Elected
16	Jan van Zijl	531	Elected
17	Jeltje van Nieuwenhoven	2,432	Elected
18	Adri Duivesteijn	866	Elected
19	Flip Buurmeijer	944	Elected
20	Maarten van Traa	1,074	Elected
21	Ella Kalsbeek-Jasperse	680	Elected
22	Thanasis Apostolou	1,427	Elected
23	Dick de Cloe	428	Elected
24	Eisso Woltjer	806	Elected
25	Margo Vliegenthart	948	Elected
26	Evan Rozenblad	1,486	Elected
27	Henk Vos	935	Elected
28	Martin Zijlstra	772	Elected
29	Peter van Heemst	1,847	Elected
30	Johanneke Liemburg	4,066	Elected
31	John Lilipaly	9,142	Elected
32	Ferd Crone	938	Elected
33	Gerda Dijksman	3,133	Elected
34	Sharon Dijksma	18,379	Elected
35	Gerritjan van Oven	1,853	Elected
36	Josephine Verspaget	1,150	Elected
37	Wim van Gelder	677	Elected
38	Marjet van Zuylen	1,842	Replacement
39	Mieke van der Burg	763	Replacement
40	Servaas Huys	2,471	Replacement
41	Jaap Jelle Feenstra	480	Replacement
42	Rob van Gijzel	396	Replacement
43	Mieke Sterk	1,395	Replacement
44	Bert Middel	482	Replacement
45	Hamid Houda	483	Replacement
46	Willie Swildens-Rozendaal	257	Replacement
47	Tineke Witteveen-Hevinga	511	Replacement
48	Peter Rehwinkel	345	Replacement
49	Gerrit Valk	352	Replacement
50	Leni van Rijn-Vellekoop	624	
51	Arie de Jong	1,851	Replacement
52	Dick Benschop	260	
53	Han Noten	147	
54	Bert Koenders	185	Replacement
55	Marja Wagenaar	900	Replacement
56	Elsbeth van Hylckama Vlieg	2,863	
57	Gerrit Jan van Otterloo	16,643	
58	Annemarie Grewel	2,245	
59	Arie Kuijper	651	
60	Noor Samkalden	362	
61	Mariëtte Hamer	261	
62	Irene Havermans	1,045	
63	Tom Stom	289	
64	Sybren Piersma	136	
65	Willem Witteveen	242	
66	Wim Derksen	220	
67	Leo Balai	1,321	
Total			

== 3: People's Party for Freedom and Democracy ==
Candidate list for People's Party for Freedom and Democracy
Position	Candidate	Votes	Result
1	Frits Bolkestein	1,248,074	Elected
2	Erica Terpstra	311,284	Elected
3	Hans Dijkstal	24,838	Elected
4	Annemarie Jorritsma-Lebbink	35,215	Elected
5	Robin Linschoten	60,730	Elected
6	Dick Dees	4,557	Elected
7	Jan Franssen	2,236	Elected
8	Rudolf de Korte	7,311	Elected
9	Frans Weisglas	5,418	Elected
10	Anne Lize van der Stoel	8,943	Elected
11	Benk Korthals	3,905	Elected
12	Johan Remkes	3,457	Elected
13	Margreet Kamp	2,063	Elected
14	Henk van Hoof	925	Elected
15	Jan te Veldhuis	1,665	Elected
16	Broos van Erp	2,339	Elected
17	Piet Blauw	10,137	Elected
18	Hella Voûte-Droste	2,097	Elected
19	Henk Kamp	1,931	Elected
20	Jos van Rey	20,466	Elected
21	Enric Hessing	678	Elected
22	Jan Dirk Blaauw	2,391	Elected
23	Hans Hoogervorst	366	Elected
24	Nellie Verbugt	2,644	Elected
25	Sari van Heemskerck Pillis-Duvekot	1,509	Elected
26	Oussama Cherribi	857	Elected
27	Bibi de Vries	1,440	Elected
28	Marijke Essers-Huiskamp	1,230	Elected
29	Jan Rijpstra	1,128	Elected
30	Clemens Cornielje	1,547	Elected
31	Monique de Vries	9,130	Elected
32	Jan Hendrik Klein Molekamp	1,185	Replacement
33	Anke van Blerck-Woerdman	1,146	Replacement
34	Theo van den Doel	586	Replacement
35	Otto Vos	548	Replacement
36	Willem Keur	376	Replacement
37	Alexander Beels	320	
38	Pieter Hofstra	452	Replacement
39	Ruud Luchtenveld	355	Replacement
40-44	Regional candidates		
Total			

=== Regional candidates ===
Regional candidates for People's Party for Freedom and Democracy
Candidate	Votes	Result	Position per electoral district			
Candidate	Votes	Result	Groningen, Leeuwarden, Assen, Zwolle, Den Bosch	Lelystad, Nijmegen, Arnhem, Utrecht	Amsterdam, Haarlem, Den Helder, Den Haag	Rotterdam, Dordrecht, Leiden, Middelburg, Tilburg, Maastricht
Joop Boertjens	74					41
Vincent Braam	405		40			
Hubert Coonen	24		41			
Jan van Dijk	66			40		
Anne Marie Heij	202			43		
Anton Kamp	68			41		
A.J. Kokshoorn	34		42			
Theo Korthals Altes	650					43
Anja Latenstein van Voorst-Woldringh	93				40	
Wim Passtoors	137	Replacement				40
H. Pluckel	119				41	
J. de Reus	588			44		
Hans Roefs	81				43	
Roel Schrotenboer	35				42	
Peter Sijmons	58		43			
Johan Stevens	38			42		
Ria Tamis	1,007				44	
Margo Toorop	219					42
Hans Vrind	1,169					44
Michiel Wigman	406		44			

== 4: Democrats 66 ==
Candidate list for Democrats 66
Position	Candidate	Votes	Result
1	Hans van Mierlo	1,212,203	
2	Gerrit Jan Wolffensperger	30,692	
3	Jacob Kohnstamm	11,382	
4	Dick Tommel	3,781	
5	Louise Groenman	56,923	
6	Aad Nuis	2,418	
7	Olga Scheltema-de Nie	9,609	
8	Arthie Schimmel	1,916	
9	Joke Jorritsma-van Oosten	6,852	
10	Ursie Lambrechts	2,348	
11	Gerrit Ybema	4,169	
12	Machteld Versnel-Schmitz	2,034	
13	Boris Dittrich	2,291	
14	Pieter ter Veer	1,038	
15	Hubert Fermina	3,342	
15	Nicky van 't Riet	2,340	
17	Marijke Augusteijn-Esser	3,063	
18	Thom de Graaf	799	
19	Marijn de Koning	3,402	
20	Bob van den Bos	432	
21-30	Regional candidates		
Total			

=== Regional candidates (D66) ===
==== Groningen, Leeuwarden, Assen, Zwolle ====
Regional candidates in Groningen, Leeuwarden, Assen and Zwolle for D66
Position	Candidate	Votes	Result
21	Jan van Walsem	266	
22	Anneke Portegies	1,132	
23	Gerben Poortinga	354	
24	Salee Edin	95	
25	Dorien Rookmaker	1,107	
26	Monique Zwetsloot	228	
27	Else Rose Kuiper	159	
28	Jan van Dalen	184	
29	Emile Esajas	133	
30	Han Westerhof	535	

==== Lelystad, Utrecht, Dordrecht, Middelburg ====
Regional candidates in Lelystad, Utrecht, Dordrecht and Middelburg for D66
Position	Candidate	Votes	Result
21	Roger van Boxtel	320	
22	Hans Jeekel	150	
23	Michel van Hulten	155	
24	Popke Wagenaar	133	
25	Frits Herman de Groot	136	
26	Otto Jochems	138	
27	Ruud de Blij	290	
28	Dick Teegelaar	2,626	
29	Carla Kuijpers	695	
30	Paul Doucet	593	

==== Nijmegen, Tilburg, Den Bosch, Maastricht ====
Regional candidates in Nijmegen, Tilburg, Den Bosch and Maastricht for D66
Position	Candidate	Votes	Result
21	Paul Wessels	1,859	
22	Marjolijn de Nijs-van den Berg	1,146	
23	Henk Giebels	1,006	
24	Simone Bilderbeek	290	
25	Vinko Prizmic	130	
26	Rudy Tuik	3,552	
27	Stijn Verbeeck	78	
28	Roland de Bruijn	819	
29	Felix Peppelenbosch	71	
30	Harro Wiekhart	443	

==== Amsterdam, Haarlem, Den Helder ====
Regional candidates in Amsterdam, Haarlem and Den Helder for D66
Position	Candidate	Votes	Result
21	Francine Giskes	404	
22	Guikje Rutten	446	
23	Stefanie van Vliet	600	
24	Pauline van de Ven	599	
25	Chan Choenni	382	
26	Chel Mertens	88	
27	Mehmet Tütüncü	659	
28	Maartje Romme	224	
29	Mimy Sluiter	216	
30	Marjolijn Hazebroek	1,246	

==== Den Haag, Rotterdam, Leiden ====
Regional candidates in Den Haag, Rotterdam and Leiden for D66
Position	Candidate	Votes	Result
21	Bert Bakker	127	
22	Jan Hoekema	259	
23	Jan Willem van Waning	87	
24	Harry van Woerden	316	
25	Marianne de Leur-van Os	441	
26	Francisca Ravestein	3,048	
27	Ingrid van Engelshoven	193	
28	Kamla van Beelen-Balak	278	
29	Kees Klompenhouwer	124	
30	Michel Groothuizen	453	

== 5: GroenLinks ==
Candidate list for GroenLinks
Position	Candidate	Votes	Result
1	Ina Brouwer	191,197	Elected, but declined
2	Mohamed Rabbae	30,157	Elected
3	Paul Rosenmöller	20,715	Elected
4	Leoni Sipkes	6,268	Elected
5	Marijke Vos	7,815	Elected
6	Tara Oedayraj Singh Varma	11,449	Replacement
7	Bram van Ojik	1,141	
8	Ineke van Gent	3,691	
9	Herman Meijer	1,081	
10	Ab Harrewijn	1,655	
11	Simone van Geest	6,029	
12	Wilbert Willems	1,058	
13	Piet de Visser	6,200	
14	Jan Willem Duijvendak	590	
15	Marjan Lucas	1,414	
17	Kees Diepeveen	230	
18	Herma Hofmeijer	435	
19	Radi Suudi	393	
20	Cor Ofman	283	
21-30	Regional candidates		
Total			

=== Regional candidates (GL) ===
Regional candidates for GroenLinks
Candidate	Votes	Result	Position per electoral district																	
Candidate	Votes	Result	Groningen	Leeuwarden	Assen	Zwolle	Lelystad	Nijmegen	Arnhem	Utrecht	Amsterdam	Haarlem	Den Helder	Den Haag	Rotterdam	Dordrecht	Leiden	Middelburg	Tilburg, Den Bosch	Maastricht
Arnold Abbema	28																28			
Judo Bakker	38						21													
Peter Bakker	99												22							
Julia Barten	210																		29	
Hub Bemelmans	689																			23
Bert van den Berg	82												24							
Hans Biewinga-Dagnelie	18						25													
Klaas Blanksma	35				26															
Marjan Blümer	36															25				
Hans Boer	40		26																	
Saar Boerlage	227										21									
Constance Bogers	27													22						
Saskia Bolten	192																		21	
Gerda Bosdriesz	148															21				
Hanneke ten Boske	105									29										
Theo Bouwman	253																		27	
Kees Bozelie	39												26							
Roelie Braaksma-Bruinsma	341			23																
Peter Breedveld	50								25											
Guido den Broeder	29														28			29		
Inge van den Broek	18							21												
Maya de Bruijn-Reefman	423																			28
Machteld Cairo	249														24					
Nesrin Cingöz	340								21											
Atnan Dalkiran	150										26									
Rudi van Dantzig	2,722		30	24	30	30	30	30	30	30	27	24	28	30	30	30	30	30	30	30
Karin Dekker	197		21																	
Toon van Dijk	81							22												
Henk Dijkstra	22				28															
Gabriëlle van Dinteren	41				29															
Willemien Dirks	65				23															
Roelie Dorenbos	47		27																	
Cor Drost	141		25																	
Jan Duffhauss	115																		24	
Willem Eijdems	453																			26
Hülya Elmas	246											21								
Peter Freij	434																			25
Jan Glissenaar	54									28										
Coen Goedkoop	11						24													
Ruud Grondel	22										24									
Ank de Groot-Slagter	69																27			
Frans van Grunsven	73																		28	
Jelle de Gruyter	4							25												
Helma Gubbels-Korver	751																			22
Roel van Gurp	136																		22	
Riekje de Haan	120										25									
Yasmina Haifi	152													24						
Joop Hakze	246			22																
Fer Harleman	105				24															
Helma Heijerman-Ton	56									21										
Jeanne van den Heuvel	205									23										
André van Himme	265																	21		
Klaas Wybo van der Hoek	41		22																	
Hans van 't Hof	23															29				
Frank Hoogenboom	12						22													
Kees Hulsman	44										22									
Léon Huybregts	238																			29
Piet van IJzendoorn	35						28													
Johan Janssen	5							26												
Folkert Jellesma	114					28														
Miep de Jong-de Groot	67									25										
Marianne Juffermans-Zandbergen	118																		26	
Harrie Kampf	14													21						
Yusuf Kaynak	108													25						
Kees Kersaan	32		28																	
Anita Keuning-de Jong	41									27										
Karien Kienhuis-Smits	261																			24
Atie Knottnerus-Kuis	71				21															
Agnes Koelemij	4																	22		
Amy Koopmanschap	76										23									
Lukas Koops	44				22															
Hilbrand Korver	28											22								
Henk Koster	90					23														
Bram Kruit	19															28				
Bea Kruse	98														21					
Theo Kuipers	7						23													
Chris Kwant	22													23						
Atie de Lange-Koster	123															27				
Piet Lansbergen	30																26			
Bart de Leede	88															24				
Jelis van Leeuwen	59								22											
Jan Lensen	16						26													
Cees van Lubek	27												27							
Kees Luesink	96								23											
Hans de la Mar	202																24			
Erik Meijer	55													29	25			26		
Cox Merkelijn	136								26											
Edith van Middelkoop	195																21			
Jeannine Molier	707		16	16	16	16	16	16	16	15	16	16	16	16	16	16	16	15	16	16
Cécile Morselt-de Ruijter	90					24														
Jan Muijtjens	840																			27
Bea Oomens	92															23				
Thom Oorthuis	64					29														
Ronald Paping	54		29																	
Piet de Peuter	121																		25	
Jan van der Pijll	83						29													
Ruth Post-Hooykaas	15				25															
Kees Posthumus	108								24											
Niek Roozenburg	26													26						
Jaap Schep	15															26				
René Scherrenberg	2							27												
Wijnand Sengers	30														26					
Pyt Jon Sikkema	546			21																
Norga Simons	25																29			
Ilona Sleutels-de Wit	52																25	27		
Margreet Smit-van Gelder	76												25							
Marianne Spierings	128					22												25		
Aletta van der Stap	46		24																	
Hugo van der Steenhoven	89									24										
Albert Storm	40					25														
Tof Thissen	686																			21
Gerrit van Tol	22														29					
Marinus Trommel	72					27														
Dirk van Uitert	44							29	29											
Pieter van Vemde	113								27											
Theo Verlaan	16						27													
Hans Visser	160													28	23					
Marcel Vissers	94															22				
Crista Vonkeman	74														27					
Loek van Voorst	53					26														
Robbert van der Vos	57														22					
Mirjam de Vries	24													27						
Karin Vré-IJisberg	47												23							
Meindert van der Werff	35									26										
Liesbeth Wever	253												21							
Adri Wever	102					21												23		
Maria Wiebosch-Steeman	55											23								
Nelleke van Wijk	316																		23	
Jan Wijnia	99							28												
Joop Wikkerink	68								28											
Ciska Wobma	9							23												
Frans Wulffers	13																22			
Marianne van der Zeeuw-Koppert	85																23	28		
Hamza Zeid Kailani	91									22								24		
Cees van der Zouwen	2							24												
Roel Zuidema	34		23																	
Dieneke Zwiers	21				27															

== 6: Reformed Political Party ==
Candidate list for the Reformed Political Party
Number	Candidate	Votes	Result
1	Bas van der Vlies	140,373	Elected
2	Koos van den Berg	3,371	Elected
3	George van Heukelom	2,384	
4	Arie Noordergraaf	1,048	
5	Gerrit Holdijk	943	
6	P.H.D. van Ree	347	
7	Gert van den Berg	421	
8	J.D. Heijkamp	265	
9	C.S.L. Janse	102	
10	G. Boonzaaijer	134	
11	W. Pieters	724	
12	P.C. den Uil	260	
13	Bert Scholten	966	
14	A.P. de Jong	158	
15	L.G.I. Barth	176	
16	M. Bogerd	641	
17	Roelof Bisschop	161	
18	Dirk-Jan Budding	553	
19	J. Dankers	119	
20	Adri van Heteren	109	
21	A. Beens	654	
22	J. Mulder	66	
23	L. Bolier	54	
24	W. Bron	98	
25	Tj. de Jong	300	
26	F.W. den Boef	109	
27	W. Fieret	145	
28	J.A. Coster	56	
29	Hans Tanis	193	
30	N. Verdouw	300	

== 7: Reformed Political League ==
Candidate list for Reformed Political League
Position	Candidate	Votes	Result
1	Gert Schutte	112,431	
2	Eimert van Middelkoop	1,483	
3	Martin van Haeften	619	
4	Leo Bezemer	319	
5	Mieke Wilke-van der Linden	1,749	
6	Janco Cnossen	187	
7	Hans Blokland	206	
8	Marjan Haak-Griffioen	222	
9	Joop Alssema	117	
10	Theo Haasdijk	62	
11	Bert Groen	124	
12	Jurjen de Vries	104	
13	Annelies van der Kolk	104	
14	Tjisse Stelpstra	49	
15	Jan Lagendijk	95	
16	Leen Hordijk	43	
17	Jan Geersing	100	
18	P. Dijkstra	135	
19	Remmelt de Boer	63	
20	Melis van de Groep	105	
21	J.M.A. Boerma-Buurman	80	
22	Aaike Kamsteeg	132	
23	Joke Parre-Hartog	73	
24	J.J. Bos	35	
25	A. van Herwijnen	56	
26	P. Jonkman	33	
27	J. Bezemer	49	
28	S. de Vries	82	
29	Th. van den Belt	53	
30	J. Oldenburger	198	
Total			

== 8: Reformatory Political Federation ==
Candidate list for Reformatory Political Federation
Position	Candidate	Votes	Result
1	Leen van Dijke	135,841	
2	André Rouvoet	2,403	
3	Dick Stellingwerf	2,113	
4	Roel Kuiper	510	
5	Alie Hoek-van Kooten	5,210	
6	J.H. ten Hove	853	
7	S.O. Voogt	494	
8	W.G. Rietkerk	689	
9	Rijk van Dam	251	
10	Johan Frinsel	1,618	
11	A. de Graaf	292	
12	A. de Boer	396	
13	Paul Blokhuis	182	
14	Henk Jochemsen	117	
15	Meindert Leerling	1,589	
16	Egbert Schuurman	354	
17	Ad de Boer	148	
18	N.C. van Velzen	255	
19	Jitze Warris	138	
20	J. Pot	82	
21-30	Regional candidates		
Total			

=== Regional candidates ===
Regional candidates for Reformatory Political Federation
Candidate	Votes	Result	Position per electoral district										
Candidate	Votes	Result	Groningen	Leeuwarden	Assen	Zwolle	Lelystad	Nijmegen, Arnhem	Utrecht, Maastricht	Amsterdam, Haarlem, Den Helder	Den Haag, Rotterdam, Dordrecht, Leiden	Middelburg	Tilburg, Den Bosch
L. Allersma	15		27										
A.R. Asma	19									28			
W.Th. Baan	22												21
W. Baarsen	203						21						
P. van Belzen	20											21	
T.W. van Bennekom	48											23	
J.A. van den Berge	9											24	
H. Bergsma	133			22									
R. Bil	84			29									
T.A. de Boer geb. Rottiné	49			24									
S.J. Boorsma	48			26									
H. Bos	7		29										
H.A. Bosma geb. Stoter	20				30								
J. Bouwmeester	23							25					
J.W. Braam	29				25								
R. Breman	82					21			27				
D. Bron	19		24										
P. Brouwer	13		22										
J. de Bruijne	18											25	
P.J.A. Burghout geb. van den Heuvel	35												22
Peter van Dalen	24								22				
A.W. van Dijk	76										23		
T. Elzinga	8											30	
A. Ensing	18				24								
R. Ferwerda	138			23									
A. van Geest geb. Groothuis	111						22	22	25				
B. Geleijnse	52										27		
H. Geurts	55							26					
T. de Geus	81									30			
G.H. Haan	48		25										
C.J. Hameeteman	54										28		
J.A. Hekstra	35									26			
W.J.E. Hendriks	105							21	24				
J. Hilverts	32		21										
J. Hoekman	41			30									
J. Holland	107					24							
A. Hollemans	19												23
C. Houweling	84							27					
B. Huijgen	21						23						
A. Huisman	11			27									
H. Jansen Dzn.	33					26							
D. Janssen	21				29								
P. Jong	165									23			
J. de Jong geb. Wiersma	11		26										
C.A.E. de Jonge	113								28		22		
A.H. de Jongh	63								30		21		
P.D. Jonker	44										29		
A. Kadijk	24						24						
H. van Kamp	34												24
K. Kerkstra	30			28									
D.J. Kleingeld	41												25
A. Kok	31						25						
G. Kramer	17									21			
G.J. Kroeze	83					27							
C. Kruijmer	43									25			
F.A. de Lange	50							28					
M. van Langevelde	22												26
A.L. Langius	20				21								
L. van der Lei	36				28								
C.J. Leunis	70											27	
G.J. Lingeman	79					25							
L.M. Luitwieler	9											26	
H. Madern	8				22								
A.W. Maris	28											28	
W. Meijer	33			25									
C.A. Mensinga	111										30		
W. Mol	4											29	
K.A. Mol	26		30										
M. Munneke geb. Brouwer	11		28										
G. Nentjes	44						26						
F.J. Nieuwenhuis	156					22							
A. Noorloos	47						27						
Willem Nuis	117							24	29				
A. van Oortmerssen	15										24		
Z. van Pelt	39												30
J.S. van der Ploeg	25												27
G. Reuvers	66					28							
J. van de Riet	65					29							
H.S. Roelfsema	32		23										
R. Rorije	36						28						
B.G. van Ruiswijk	11									29			
N.Th. Schipper	51												28
J. Schokker	16				27								
R. Schoorstra	54			21									
Dick Schutte	233						29	23	26				
K. Senneker	33										25		
R.H.G.M. Sonnemans	80												29
R. van der Stouwe	56					30							
T. Uuldriks	3				26								
M. Verhage geb. van Kooten	49								23	22			
L.M.I. Vermaat geb. Beenhakker	17								21				
M.P. Vermeulen	45							29					
G.H. Verwoerd	68					23							
Tom Viezee	132										26		
Henk Visser	21											22	
H. Vos	77									24			
T.J. Vreugdenhil	44									27			
A. Wendt	28				23								
H. Witteveen	11						30						
A. van de Woestijne	145							30					

== See also ==
- List of members of the House of Representatives of the Netherlands, 1994–1998

== Source ==
- Kiesraad (10 May 1994). "Proces-verbaal zitting Kiesraad uitslag Tweede Kamerverkiezing 1994" (PDF) (in Dutch).
