= List of members of the House of Representatives of the Netherlands, 1994–1998 =

House of Representatives, 1994–1998
←	1989–1994	1998–2002	→
- Composition of the House of Representatives at the start of the term.

Overview
- Legislative body: House of Representatives
- Meeting place: Binnenhof
- Term: 17 May 1994 – 18 May 1998
- Election: 1994
- Government: First Kok cabinet PvdA: 37 VVD: 31 D66: 24
- Opposition: CDA: 34 AOV: 6 GL: 5 RPF: 3 CD: 3 SGP: 2 GPV: 2 SP: 2 U55+: 1
- Members: 150
- Speaker of the House of Representatives: Wim Deetman; Piet Bukman

Between 17 May 1994 and 18 May 1998, 187 individuals served as representatives in the House of Representatives, the 150-seat lower house of the States-General of the Netherlands. 150 representatives were elected in the 3 May 1994 general election and installed at the start of the term; 37 representatives were appointed as replacements when elected representatives resigned or went on leave.

After the election, the first Kok cabinet was formed from a coalition of the Labour Party (PvdA, 37 seats), People's Party for Freedom and Democracy (VVD, 31 seats) and Democrats 66 (D66, 24 seats). The opposition consisted of the Christian Democratic Appeal (CDA, 34 seats), General Elderly Alliance (AOV, 6 seats), GroenLinks (GL, 5 seats), Centre Democrats (CD, 3 seats), Reformatory Political Federation (RPF, 3 seats), Reformed Political Party (SGP, 2 seats), Reformed Political League (GPV, 2 seats), Socialist Party (SP, 2 seats) and Union 55+ (1 seat).

== Members ==
All members are sworn in at the start of the term, even if they are not new. Assumed office in this list therefore refers to the swearing in during this term (or return date of members who left), while all members are automatically considered to have left office at the end of the term.

Members of the House of Representatives of the Netherlands, 1994–1998
Name	Parliamentary group	Assumed office	Left office	Ref.
Karin Adelmund	PvdA	17 May 1994	18 May 1998	
Liesbeth Aiking-van Wageningen	AOV (Note: Until 29 August 1995)	17 May 1994	18 May 1998	
Liesbeth Aiking-van Wageningen	Nijpels (Note: Starting 29 August 1995)	17 May 1994	18 May 1998	
Thanasis Apostolou	PvdA	17 May 1994	18 May 1998	
Agnes van Ardenne	CDA	17 May 1994	18 May 1998	
Anneke Assen	CDA	26 April 1995	18 May 1998	
Marijke Augusteijn-Esser	D66	17 May 1994	18 May 1998	
Bert Bakker	D66	17 May 1994	18 May 1998	
Relus ter Beek	PvdA	17 May 1994	31 December 1994 (Note: Left to become Queen's Commissioner of Drenthe)	
Marten Beinema	CDA	17 May 1994	18 May 1998	
Koos van den Berg	SGP	17 May 1994	18 May 1998	
Pieter Jan Biesheuvel	CDA	17 May 1994	18 May 1998	
Ank Bijleveld	CDA	17 May 1994	18 May 1998	
Jan Dirk Blaauw	VVD	17 May 1994	18 May 1998	
Piet Blauw	VVD	17 May 1994	18 May 1998	
Anke van Blerck-Woerdman	VVD	13 June 1995	18 May 1998	
Mieke Boers-Wijnberg	CDA	17 May 1994	30 November 1995 (Note: Left to focus on international environmental policy)	
Frits Bolkestein	VVD	17 May 1994	18 May 1998	
Leo Boogaard sr.	AOV	17 May 1994	31 August 1996 (Note: Left for health reasons)	
Leo Boogaard sr.	Nijpels	17 May 1994	31 August 1996	
Bob van den Bos	D66	17 May 1994	18 May 1998	
Roger van Boxtel	D66	30 August 1994	18 May 1998	
Cees Bremmer	CDA	7 June 1995	18 May 1998	
Elco Brinkman	CDA	17 May 1994	25 April 1995 (Note: Left to become chair of Algemeen Verbond Bouwbedrijf)	
Piet Bukman	CDA	18 May 1994	18 May 1998	
Mieke van der Burg	PvdA	21 June 1994	18 May 1998	
Vincent van der Burg	CDA	17 May 1994	18 May 1998	
Flip Buurmeijer	PvdA	17 May 1994	31 December 1994 (Note: Left to become chair of the Temporary Institute for Coordination)	
Wim van de Camp	CDA	17 May 1994	18 May 1998	
Sam Cherribi	VVD	17 May 1994	18 May 1998	
Dick de Cloe	PvdA	17 May 1994	18 May 1998	
Clemens Cornielje	VVD	17 May 1994	18 May 1998	
Ferd Crone	PvdA	17 May 1994	18 May 1998	
Nancy Dankers	CDA	17 May 1994	18 May 1998	
Dick Dees	VVD	17 May 1994	12 June 1995 (Note: Left to join the Senate)	
Wim Deetman	CDA	17 May 1994	30 November 1996 (Note: Left to become mayor of The Hague)	
Leen van Dijke	RPF	17 May 1994	18 May 1998	
Sharon Dijksma	PvdA	17 May 1994	18 May 1998	
Gerda Dijksman	PvdA	17 May 1994	31 August 1997 (Note: Left to become district police chief)	
Hans Dijkstal	VVD	17 May 1994	22 August 1994 (Note: Left to join the cabinet)	
Boris Dittrich	D66	17 May 1994	18 May 1998	
Theo van den Doel	VVD	30 August 1994	18 May 1998	
Ali Doelman-Pel	CDA	17 May 1994	18 May 1998	
Adri Duivesteijn	PvdA	17 May 1994	18 May 1998	
Wim Elsthout	CD	18 December 1997	18 May 1998	
Broos van Erp	VVD	17 May 1994	2 June 1997 (Note: Died in office)	
Berry Esselink	CDA	17 May 1994	20 September 1996	
Jaap-Jelle Feenstra	PvdA	18 March 1997	18 May 1998	
Hubert Fermina	D66	17 May 1994	18 May 1998	
Jan Franssen	VVD	17 May 1994	7 September 1994 (Note: Left to become mayor of Zwolle)	
Dzsingisz Gabor	CDA	17 May 1994	18 May 1998	
Wim van Gelder	PvdA	17 May 1994	18 May 1998	
Rob van Gijzel	PvdA	30 August 1994	18 May 1998	
Francine Giskes	D66	17 May 1994	18 May 1998	
Thom de Graaf	D66	17 May 1994	18 May 1998	
Louise Groenman	D66	17 May 1994	29 August 1995 (Note: Left for personal reasons)	
Henk de Haan	CDA	3 December 1996	18 May 1998	
Sari van Heemskerck Pillis-Duvekot	VVD	17 May 1994	18 May 1998	
Peter van Heemst	PvdA	17 May 1994	18 May 1998	
Bob Heeringa	CDA	2 September 1997	18 May 1998	
Enneüs Heerma	CDA	17 May 1994	8 April 1997 (Note: Left for political reasons)	
Frans Jozef van der Heijden	CDA	17 May 1994	18 May 1998	
Theo Hendriks	AOV (Note: Until 11 October 1994)	17 May 1994	18 May 1998	
Theo Hendriks	Hendriks (Note: Starting 11 October 1994)	17 May 1994	18 May 1998	
Enric Hessing	VVD	17 May 1994	18 May 1998	
Hans Hillen	CDA	17 May 1994	18 May 1998	
Ernst Hirsch Ballin	CDA	17 May 1994	31 May 1995	
Jan Hoekema	D66	17 May 1994	18 May 1998	
Maria van der Hoeven	CDA	17 May 1994	18 May 1998	
Pieter Hofstra	VVD	8 September 1994	18 May 1998	
Henk van Hoof	VVD	17 May 1994	18 May 1998	
Hans Hoogervorst	VVD	17 May 1994	18 May 1998	
Jaap de Hoop Scheffer	CDA	17 May 1994	18 May 1998	
Jan ten Hoopen	CDA	5 December 1995	18 May 1998	
Hamid Houda	PvdA	30 August 1994	18 November 1997 (Note: Left because of a scandal)	
Servaas Huys	PvdA	30 August 1994	18 May 1998	
Hans Janmaat	CD	17 May 1994	18 May 1998	
Hans Jeekel	D66	30 August 1995	18 May 1998	
Arie de Jong	PvdA	3 September 1997	18 May 1998	
Gerrit de Jong	CDA	17 May 1994	18 May 1998	
Annemarie Jorritsma	VVD	17 May 1994	22 August 1994	
Joke Jorritsma-van Oosten	D66	17 May 1994	18 May 1998	
Ella Kalsbeek	PvdA	17 May 1994	18 May 1998	
Henk Kamp	VVD	17 May 1994	18 May 1998	
Margreet Kamp	VVD	17 May 1994	18 May 1998	
Willem Keur	VVD	30 August 1994	18 May 1998	
Jan Hendrik Klein Molekamp	VVD	30 August 1994	18 May 1998	
Alis Koekkoek	CDA	17 May 1994	18 May 1998	
Bert Koenders	PvdA	11 November 1997	18 May 1998	
Jacob Kohnstamm	D66	17 May 1994	22 August 1994	
Wim Kok	PvdA	17 May 1994	22 August 1994	
Marijn de Koning	D66	17 May 1994	18 May 1998	
Rudolf de Korte	VVD	17 May 1994	31 August 1995 (Note: Left to become vice president of the European Investment Bank)	
Benk Korthals	VVD	17 May 1994	18 May 1998	
Aad Kosto	PvdA	17 May 1994	12 September 1994 (Note: Left to join the Council of State)	
Ursie Lambrechts	D66	17 May 1994	18 May 1998	
Ad Lansink	CDA	17 May 1994	18 May 1998	
Bertus Leerkes	U55+	17 May 1994	18 May 1998	
Gerd Leers	CDA	17 May 1994	18 May 1998	
Marijke van Lente-Huiskamp	VVD	17 May 1994	18 May 1998	
Johanneke Liemburg	PvdA	17 May 1994	18 May 1998	
John Lilipaly	PvdA	17 May 1994	18 May 1998	
René van der Linden	CDA	17 May 1994	18 May 1998	
Robin Linschoten	VVD	17 May 1994	22 August 1994	
Ruud Luchtenveld	VVD	26 August 1997	18 May 1998	
Jan Marijnissen	SP	17 May 1994	18 May 1998	
Wim Mateman	CDA	17 May 1994	18 May 1998	
Theo Meijer	CDA	8 October 1996	18 May 1998	
Ad Melkert	PvdA	17 May 1994	22 August 1994	
Ron Meyer	Nijpels	3 September 1996	18 May 1998	
Bert Middel	PvdA	30 August 1994	18 May 1998	
Eimert van Middelkoop	GPV	17 May 1994	18 May 1998	
Hans van Mierlo	D66	17 May 1994	22 August 1994	
Nel Mulder-van Dam	CDA	17 May 1994	18 May 1998	
Tineke Netelenbos	PvdA	17 May 1994	22 August 1994	
Jeltje van Nieuwenhoven	PvdA	17 May 1994	18 May 1998	
Jet Nijpels	AOV	17 May 1994	18 May 1998	
Jet Nijpels	Nijpels	17 May 1994	18 May 1998	
Saskia Noorman-den Uyl	PvdA	17 May 1994	18 May 1998	
Aad Nuis	D66	17 May 1994	22 August 1994	
Rob Oudkerk	PvdA	17 May 1994	18 May 1998	
Gerritjan van Oven	PvdA	17 May 1994	18 May 1998	
Wim Passtoors	VVD	5 September 1995	18 May 1998	
Rick van der Ploeg	PvdA	17 May 1994	18 May 1998	
Remi Poppe	SP	17 May 1994	18 May 1998	
Jan Pronk	PvdA	18 May 1994	22 August 1994	
Mohamed Rabbae	GL	17 May 1994	18 May 1998	
Peter Rehwinkel	PvdA	24 January 1995	18 May 1998	
Jacob Reitsma	CDA	17 May 1994	18 May 1998	
Johan Remkes	VVD	17 May 1994	18 May 1998	
Jos van Rey	VVD	17 May 1994	18 May 1998	
Nicky van 't Riet	D66	17 May 1994	18 May 1998	
Jan Rijpstra	VVD	17 May 1994	18 May 1998	
Guikje Roethof	D66	17 May 1994	18 May 1998	
Yvonne van Rooy	CDA	17 May 1994	31 August 1997 (Note: Left to become chair of Tilburg University)	
Paul Rosenmöller	GL	17 May 1994	18 May 1998	
André Rouvoet	RPF	17 May 1994	18 May 1998	
Evan Rozenblad	PvdA	18 May 1994	15 June 1994	
Olga Scheltema-de Nie	D66	17 May 1994	18 May 1998	
Arthie Schimmel	D66	17 May 1994	18 May 1998	
Gert Schutte	GPV	17 May 1994	18 May 1998	
Wil Schuurman	CD	17 May 1994	18 May 1998	
Tara Singh Varma	GL	17 May 1994	18 May 1998	
Leoni Sipkes	GL	17 May 1994	18 May 1998	
Ries Smits	CDA	17 May 1994	18 May 1998	
Marian Soutendijk-van Appeldoorn	CDA	17 May 1994	18 May 1998	
Dick Stellingwerf	RPF	17 May 1994	18 May 1998	
Mieke Sterk	PvdA	30 August 1994	18 May 1998	
Anne Lize van der Stoel	VVD	17 May 1994	18 May 1998	
Willie Swildens-Rozendaal	PvdA	30 August 1994	18 May 1998	
Erica Terpstra	VVD	17 May 1994	22 August 1994	
Gerrit Terpstra	CDA	17 May 1994	18 May 1998	
Dick Tommel	D66	17 May 1994	22 August 1994	
Maarten van Traa	PvdA	17 May 1994	21 October 1997	
Gerrit Valk	PvdA	24 January 1995	18 May 1998	
Pieter ter Veer	D66	17 May 1994	18 May 1998	
Jan te Veldhuis	VVD	17 May 1994	18 May 1998	
Nellie Verbugt	VVD	17 May 1994	18 May 1998	
Maxime Verhagen	CDA	17 May 1994	18 May 1998	
Will Verkerk	AOV (Note: Until 31 March 1998)	18 May 1994	18 May 1998	
Will Verkerk	Verkerk (Note: Starting 31 March 1998)	18 May 1994	18 May 1998	
Willem Vermeend	PvdA	17 May 1994	22 August 1994	
Machteld Versnel-Schmitz	D66	17 May 1994	18 May 1998	
Josephine Verspaget	PvdA	17 May 1994	18 May 1998	
Marry Visser-van Doorn	CDA	15 April 1997	18 May 1998	
Margo Vliegenthart	PvdA	17 May 1994	18 May 1998	
Bas van der Vlies	SGP	17 May 1994	18 May 1998	
Stefanie van Vliet	D66	30 August 1994	18 May 1998	
Henk Vos	PvdA	17 May 1994	18 May 1998	
Marijke Vos	GL	17 May 1994	18 May 1998	
Otto Vos	VVD	30 August 1994	18 May 1998	
Hella Voûte-Droste	VVD	17 May 1994	18 May 1998	
Ruud Vreeman	PvdA	17 May 1994	18 March 1997 (Note: Left to become mayor of Zaanstad)	
Bibi de Vries	VVD	17 May 1994	18 May 1998	
Monique de Vries	VVD	17 May 1994	18 May 1998	
Marja Wagenaar	PvdA	2 December 1997	18 May 1998	
Jacques Wallage	PvdA	17 May 1994	18 May 1998	
Jan van Walsem	D66	30 August 1994	18 May 1998	
Jan-Willem van Waning	D66	30 August 1994	18 May 1998	
Frans Weisglas	VVD	17 May 1994	18 May 1998	
Paul Wessels	D66	3 December 1997	18 May 1998	
Cees van Wingerden	AOV (Note: Until 31 May 1995 and between 29 August 1995 and 31 March 1998)	17 May 1994	18 May 1998	
Cees van Wingerden	Van Wingerden (Note: Between 31 May 1995 and 29 August 1995 and starting 31 March 1998)	17 May 1994	18 May 1998	
Tineke Witteveen-Hevinga	PvdA	14 September 1994	18 May 1998	
Gerrit Jan Wolffensperger	D66	17 May 1994	2 December 1997 (Note: Left to become chair of NOS)	
Frans Wolters	CDA	17 May 1994	18 May 1998	
Thijs Wöltgens	PvdA	17 May 1994	30 August 1994 (Note: Left to become mayor of Kerkrade)	
Eisso Woltjer	PvdA	17 May 1994	18 May 1998	
Gerrit Ybema	D66	17 May 1994	18 May 1998	
Jan van Zijl	PvdA	17 May 1994	18 May 1998	
Martin Zijlstra	PvdA	17 May 1994	18 May 1998	
Cor Zonneveld	CD	17 May 1994	13 December 1997	
Marjet van Zuijlen	PvdA	18 May 1994	18 May 1998	

== See also ==
- List of candidates in the 1994 Dutch general election
