= List of members of the House of Representatives of the Netherlands, 1998–2002 =

House of Representatives, 1998–2002
←	1994–1998	2002–2003	→
- Composition of the House of Representatives at the start of the term.

Overview
- Legislative body: House of Representatives
- Meeting place: Binnenhof
- Term: 19 May 1998 – 22 May 2002
- Election: 1998
- Government: Second Kok cabinet PvdA: 45 VVD: 38 D66: 14
- Opposition: CDA: 29 GL: 11 SP: 5 RPF: 3 SGP: 3 GPV: 2
- Members: 150
- Speaker of the House of Representatives: Jeltje van Nieuwenhoven

Between 19 May 1998 and 22 May 2002, 189 individuals served as representatives in the House of Representatives, the 150-seat lower house of the States-General of the Netherlands. 150 representatives were elected in the 6 May 1998 general election and installed at the start of the term; 39 representatives were appointed as replacements when elected representatives resigned or went on leave.

After the election, the second Kok cabinet was formed from a coalition of the Labour Party (PvdA, 45 seats), People's Party for Freedom and Democracy (VVD, 38 seats) and Democrats 66 (D66, 14 seats). The opposition consisted of the Christian Democratic Appeal (CDA, 29 seats), GroenLinks (GL, 11 seats), Socialist Party (SP, 5 seats), Reformatory Political Federation (RPF, 3 seats), Reformed Political Party (SGP, 3 seats), and Reformed Political League (GPV, 2 seats).

== Members ==
All members are sworn in at the start of the term, even if they are not new. Assumed office in this list therefore refers to the swearing in during this term (or return date of members who left), while all members are automatically considered to have left office at the end of the term.

Members of the House of Representatives of the Netherlands, 1998–2002
Name	Parliamentary group	Assumed office	Left office	Ref.
Jozias van Aartsen	VVD	19 May 1998	3 August 1998 (Note: Left to join the cabinet)	
Karin Adelmund	PvdA	19 May 1998	3 August 1998	
Hans van den Akker	CDA	19 May 1998	22 May 2002	
Nebahat Albayrak	PvdA	19 May 1998	22 May 2002	
Thanasis Apostolou	PvdA	25 August 1998	22 May 2002	
Agnes van Ardenne	CDA	19 May 1998	22 May 2002	
Khadija Arib	PvdA	19 May 1998	22 May 2002	
Joop Atsma	CDA	19 May 1998	22 May 2002	
Marijke Augusteijn-Esser	D66	25 August 1998	22 May 2002	
Hans van Baalen	VVD	28 September 1999	22 May 2002	
Bert Bakker	D66	19 May 1998	22 May 2002	
Eric Balemans	VVD	25 August 1998	22 May 2002	
Jan Peter Balkenende	CDA	19 May 1998	22 May 2002	
Marleen Barth	PvdA	19 May 1998	22 May 2002	
Willibrord van Beek	VVD	19 May 1998	22 May 2002	
Judith Belinfante	PvdA	19 May 1998	22 May 2002	
Koos van den Berg	SGP	19 May 1998	22 May 2002	
Pieter Jan Biesheuvel	CDA	19 May 1998	22 May 2002	
Ank Bijleveld	CDA	19 May 1998	16 January 2001 (Note: Left to become mayor of Hof van Twente)	
Jan Dirk Blaauw	VVD	19 May 1998	22 May 2002	
Anke van Blerck-Woerdman	VVD	19 May 1998	22 May 2002	
Stef Blok	VVD	25 August 1998	22 May 2002	
Margreeth de Boer	PvdA	19 May 1998	6 November 2001 (Note: Left to become acting mayor of Leeuwarden)	
Eppo Bolhuis	PvdA	16 January 2001	22 May 2002	
Frits Bolkestein	VVD	19 May 1998	21 September 1999 (Note: Left to become European Commissioner for Internal Market)	
Harry van Bommel	SP	19 May 1998	22 May 2002	
Els Borst	D66	19 May 1998	3 August 1998	
Wouter Bos	PvdA	19 May 1998	24 March 2000	
Roger van Boxtel	D66	19 May 1998	3 August 1998	
Philippe Brood	VVD	25 August 1998	13 April 2000 (Note: Died in office)	
Siem Buijs	CDA	19 May 1998	22 May 2002	
Jet Bussemaker	PvdA	19 May 1998	22 May 2002	
Wim van de Camp	CDA	19 May 1998	22 May 2002	
Oussama Cherribi	VVD	25 August 1998	22 May 2002	
Dick de Cloe	PvdA	19 May 1998	22 May 2002	
Clemens Cornielje	VVD	19 May 1998	22 May 2002	
Coşkun Çörüz	CDA	29 May 2001	22 May 2002	
Ferd Crone	PvdA	19 May 1998	22 May 2002	
Nancy Dankers	CDA	19 May 1998	22 May 2002	
Staf Depla	PvdA	4 October 2000	22 May 2002	
Leen van Dijke	RPF (Note: Until 13 March 2001)	19 May 1998	22 May 2002	
Leen van Dijke	CU (Note: Starting 13 March 2001)	19 May 1998	22 May 2002	
Sharon Dijksma	PvdA	19 May 1998	22 May 2002	
Hans Dijkstal	VVD	19 May 1998	22 May 2002	
Jeroen Dijsselbloem	PvdA	28 March 2000	22 May 2002	
Boris Dittrich	D66	19 May 1998	22 May 2002	
Theo van den Doel	VVD	19 May 1998	22 May 2002	
Anneke van Dok-van Weele	PvdA	26 May 1998	31 May 1999 (Note: Left to become mayor of Vlissingen)	
Desirée Duijkers	PvdA	19 May 1998	22 May 2002	
Adri Duivesteijn	PvdA	19 May 1998	22 May 2002	
Klaasje Eisses-Timmerman	CDA	19 May 1998	26 April 2001	
Camiel Eurlings	CDA	19 May 1998	22 May 2002	
Jaap-Jelle Feenstra	PvdA	19 May 1998	22 May 2002	
Jan Geluk	VVD	19 May 1998	22 May 2002	
Ineke van Gent	GL	19 May 1998	22 May 2002	
Rob van Gijzel	PvdA	19 May 1998	28 November 2001 (Note: Left for political reasons)	
Francine Giskes	D66	19 May 1998	22 May 2002	
Wouter Gortzak	PvdA	19 May 1998	22 May 2002	
Thom de Graaf	D66	19 May 1998	22 May 2002	
Frank de Grave	VVD	19 May 1998	3 August 1998	
Henk de Haan	CDA	19 May 1998	22 May 2002	
Femke Halsema	GL	19 May 1998	22 May 2002	
Mariëtte Hamer	PvdA	19 May 1998	22 May 2002	
Ab Harrewijn	GL	19 May 1998	22 May 2002	
Peter van Heemst	PvdA	19 May 1998	22 May 2002	
Corrie Hermann	GL	19 May 1998	22 May 2002	
Willem Herrebrugh	PvdA	26 August 1998	22 May 2002	
Enric Hessing	VVD	19 May 1998	22 May 2002	
Hans Hillen	CDA	19 May 1998	22 May 2002	
Rik Hindriks	PvdA	1 June 1999	22 May 2002	
Annet van der Hoek	PvdA	25 August 1998	22 May 2002	
Jan Hoekema	D66	19 May 1998	22 May 2002	
Maria van der Hoeven	CDA	19 May 1998	22 May 2002	
Pieter Hofstra	VVD	19 May 1998	22 May 2002	
Henk van Hoof	VVD	19 May 1998	3 August 1998	
Hans Hoogervorst	VVD	19 May 1998	3 August 1998	
Jaap de Hoop Scheffer	CDA	19 May 1998	22 May 2002	
Jan ten Hoopen	CDA	26 June 2001	22 May 2002	
Jo Horn	PvdA	7 November 2001	22 May 2002	
Corien Jonker	CDA	5 March 2002	22 May 2002	
Annemarie Jorritsma	VVD	19 May 1998	3 August 1998	
Ella Kalsbeek	PvdA	19 May 1998	2 January 2001	
Henk Kamp	VVD	19 May 1998	22 May 2002	
Agnes Kant	SP	19 May 1998	22 May 2002	
Farah Karimi	GL	19 May 1998	22 May 2002	
Jan Hendrik Klein Molekamp	VVD	19 May 1998	22 May 2002	
Cees van der Knaap	CDA	19 May 1998	22 May 2002	
Bert Koenders	PvdA	19 May 1998	22 May 2002	
Wim Kok	PvdA	19 May 1998	3 August 1998	
Benk Korthals	VVD	19 May 1998	3 August 1998	
Lucy Kortram	PvdA	19 May 1998	22 May 2002	
Arie Kuijper	PvdA	25 August 1998	22 May 2002	
Ursie Lambrechts	D66	19 May 1998	22 May 2002	
Gerd Leers	CDA	19 May 1998	31 January 2002 (Note: Left to become mayor of Maastricht)	
Marijke van Lente-Huiskamp	VVD	19 May 1998	22 May 2002	
Ruud Luchtenveld	VVD	25 August 1998	22 May 2002	
Jan Marijnissen	SP	19 May 1998	22 May 2002	
Els Meijer	VVD	25 August 1998	22 May 2002	
Theo Meijer	CDA	19 May 1998	22 May 2002	
Ad Melkert	PvdA	19 May 1998	22 May 2002	
Bert Middel	PvdA	19 May 1998	22 May 2002	
Eimert van Middelkoop	GPV	19 May 1998	22 May 2002	
Eimert van Middelkoop	CU	19 May 1998	22 May 2002	
Hans van Mierlo	D66	19 May 1998	18 August 1998 (Note: Left for personal reasons)	
Jacques de Milliano	CDA	19 May 1998	17 November 1998	
Hillie Molenaar	PvdA	5 September 2000	22 May 2002	
Aart Mosterd	CDA	24 November 1998	22 May 2002	
Tineke Netelenbos	PvdA	19 May 1998	3 August 1998	
Atzo Nicolaï	VVD	19 May 1998	22 May 2002	
Jacques Niederer	VVD	19 May 1998	22 May 2002	
Jeltje van Nieuwenhoven	PvdA	19 May 1998	22 May 2002	
Saskia Noorman-den Uyl	PvdA	19 May 1998	22 May 2002	
Gert-Jan Oplaat	VVD	19 May 1998	22 May 2002	
Fadime Örgü	VVD	19 May 1998	22 May 2002	
Rob Oudkerk	PvdA	19 May 1998	22 May 2002	
Gerritjan van Oven	PvdA	20 May 1998	22 May 2002	
Wim Passtoors	VVD	19 May 1998	22 May 2002	
Marleen de Pater-van der Meer	CDA	6 February 2001	22 May 2002	
Michiel Patijn	VVD	19 May 1998	30 March 2001 (Note: Left to become permanent representative of the Netherlands to NATO)	
Tom Pitstra	GL	12 June 2001	22 May 2002	
Rick van der Ploeg	PvdA	19 May 1998	3 August 1998	
Remi Poppe	SP	19 May 1998	22 May 2002	
Jan Pronk	PvdA	19 May 1998	3 August 1998	
Mohamed Rabbae	GL	19 May 1998	22 May 2002	
Francisca Ravestein	D66	19 May 1998	22 May 2002	
Peter Rehwinkel	PvdA	19 May 1998	22 May 2002	
Jacob Reitsma	CDA	19 May 1998	10 June 2001 (Note: Left to become mayor of Wymbritseradiel)	
Patricia Remak	VVD	19 May 1998	22 May 2002	
Johan Remkes	VVD	19 May 1998	3 August 1998	
Nicky van 't Riet	D66	25 August 1998	22 May 2002	
Theo Rietkerk	CDA	19 May 1998	22 May 2002	
Jan Rijpstra	VVD	19 May 1998	22 May 2002	
Paul Rosenmöller	GL	19 May 1998	22 May 2002	
Clémence Ross-van Dorp	CDA	19 May 1998	22 May 2002	
André Rouvoet	RPF	19 May 1998	22 May 2002	
André Rouvoet	CU	19 May 1998	22 May 2002	
Usman Santi	PvdA	25 August 1998	22 May 2002	
Olga Scheltema-de Nie	D66	19 May 1998	22 May 2002	
Arthie Schimmel	D66	19 May 1998	22 May 2002	
Gerrit Schoenmakers	PvdA	25 August 1998	22 May 2002	
Annie Schreijer-Pierik	CDA	19 May 1998	22 May 2002	
Gert Schutte	GPV	19 May 1998	13 February 2001	
Tara Singh Varma	GL	19 May 1998	29 May 2001	
Arie Slob	GPV	14 February 2001	22 May 2002	
Arie Slob	CU	14 February 2001	22 May 2002	
José Smits	PvdA	19 May 1998	22 May 2002	
Janneke Snijder-Hazelhoff	VVD	7 December 1999	22 May 2002	
Ernst van Splunter	VVD	3 April 2001	22 May 2002	
Laurette Spoelman	PvdA	19 May 1998	22 May 2002	
Kees van der Staaij	SGP	19 May 1998	22 May 2002	
Hugo van der Steenhoven	GL	19 May 1998	22 May 2002	
Dick Stellingwerf	RPF	19 May 1998	22 May 2002	
Dick Stellingwerf	CU	19 May 1998	22 May 2002	
Theo Stroeken	CDA	19 May 1998	22 May 2002	
Ton de Swart	VVD	9 May 2000	22 May 2002	
Willie Swildens-Rozendaal	PvdA	19 May 1998	22 May 2002	
Erica Terpstra	VVD	19 May 1998	22 May 2002	
Frans Timmermans	PvdA	19 May 1998	22 May 2002	
Thijs Udo	VVD	25 August 1998	22 May 2002	
Gerrit Valk	PvdA	19 May 1998	22 May 2002	
Pieter ter Veer	D66	19 May 1998	22 May 2002	
Jan te Veldhuis	VVD	19 May 1998	22 May 2002	
Kees Vendrik	GL	19 May 1998	22 May 2002	
Gerdi Verbeet	PvdA	11 December 2001	22 May 2002	
Gerda Verburg	CDA	19 May 1998	22 May 2002	
Nellie Verbugt	VVD	19 May 1998	22 May 2002	
Maxime Verhagen	CDA	19 May 1998	22 May 2002	
Willem Vermeend	PvdA	19 May 1998	3 August 1998	
Marry Visser-van Doorn	CDA	19 May 1998	22 May 2002	
Margo Vliegenthart	PvdA	19 May 1998	3 August 1998	
Bas van der Vlies	SGP	19 May 1998	22 May 2002	
Stefanie van Vliet	D66	25 August 1998	22 May 2002	
Joris Voorhoeve	VVD	19 May 1998	30 November 1999 (Note: Left to join the Council of State)	
Marijke Vos	GL	19 May 1998	22 May 2002	
Otto Vos	VVD	25 August 1998	22 May 2002	
Hella Voûte-Droste	VVD	19 May 1998	22 May 2002	
Bibi de Vries	VVD	19 May 1998	22 May 2002	
Monique de Vries	VVD	19 May 1998	3 August 1998	
Harm Evert Waalkens	PvdA	25 August 1998	22 May 2002	
Marja Wagenaar	PvdA	19 May 1998	22 May 2002	
Jacques Wallage	PvdA	19 May 1998	25 August 1998 (Note: Left to become mayor of Groningen)	
Jan van Walsem	D66	25 August 1998	22 May 2002	
Frans Weekers	VVD	19 May 1998	22 May 2002	
Frans Weisglas	VVD	19 May 1998	22 May 2002	
Peter van Wijmen	CDA	19 May 1998	22 May 2002	
Joop Wijn	CDA	19 May 1998	22 May 2002	
Geert Wilders	VVD	25 August 1998	22 May 2002	
Jan de Wit	SP	19 May 1998	22 May 2002	
Tineke Witteveen-Hevinga	PvdA	25 August 1998	22 May 2002	
Gerrit Ybema	D66	19 May 1998	3 August 1998	
Gerrit Zalm	VVD	19 May 1998	3 August 1998	
Jan van Zijl	PvdA	19 May 1998	3 October 2000 (Note: Left to chair a committee to establish the Council for Work and Income)	
Martin Zijlstra	PvdA	19 May 1998	22 May 2002	
Marjet van Zuijlen	PvdA	19 May 1998	31 August 2000	

== See also ==
- List of candidates in the 1998 Dutch general election
