= Theo Meijer =

Theo Meijer may refer to:

- Theo Meijer (judoka)
- Theo Meijer (politician)
