= Peter van Wijmen =

Dutch politician (1938–2015)

Member of the House of Representatives
- In office 19 May 1998 – 23 May 2002

Member of the Council of State in extraordinary service
- In office 1 November 2002 – 1 November 2006

Personal details
- Born: Peter Cornelis Evert van Wijmen; 1 September 1938 Ginneken en Bavel, Netherlands
- Died: 8 June 2015 (aged 76) Breda, Netherlands
- Party: Christian Democratic Appeal (CDA)
- Education: Radboud University Nijmegen, Utrecht University

Peter Cornelis Evert van Wijmen (1 September 1938 – 8 June 2015) was a Dutch lawyer, professor and politician, he served as member of the House of Representatives for the Christian Democratic Appeal between 1998 and 2002. As a lawyer he worked for the firm Van Wijmen Nouwen between 1962 and 1998. His law career continued as professor of nature preservation law at Tilburg University between 2001 and 2008. He simultaneously was member of the Council of State in extraordinary service between 2002 and 2006.

== Early life and career ==
Van Wijmen was born on 1 September 1938 in the municipality of Ginneken en Bavel, the son of W.J.I. van Wijmen, a lawyer and professor, and F.W.Th.M. Truijen. His grandfather P.W.H. Truyen served in the House of Representatives. Van Wijmen went to the Roman Catholic primary school in nearby Breda and completed his high school education at the O.L. Vrouwe Lyceum gymnasium between 1950 and 1956 in the same city. After completing high school he started studying Dutch law at the Catholic University of Nijmegen the same year, graduating in 1962.

The same year he graduated Van Wijmen started working as lawyer for the law firm Van Wijmen Nouwen which later became Van Wijmen en Koedam Advocaten. In 1982 he earned his doctorate in jurisprudence at Utrecht University.

Wijmen was chamberlain to Queen Beatrix of the Netherlands for the province of North Brabant between April 1989 and 19 May 1998, and he served as an honorary chamberlain since.

== Politics ==
In the 1998 Dutch general election Van Wijmen was elected to the House of Representatives for the Christian Democratic Appeal (CDA). In the House he was the party spokesperson for nature policy. He also dealt with justice, public housing, spatial planning, constitutional planning and environmental issues.

In 2000 he introduced a law proposal together with fellow CDA member Clémence Ross-van Dorp which would allow for female inheritance of noble titles. The proposal was withdrawn in 2002. In 2001 he introduced a law proposal that would allow municipalities more options to counteract instances in which other parties dodged a law that gave municipalities land with first priority rights. The proposal was introduced together with Staf Depla (PvdA) and Francisca Ravestein (D66). The proposal became law in 2002.

Wijmen's term in the House ended on 23 May 2002. He however kept following the policies of his party closely. In 2003 he criticized the plan of the CDA-lead cabinet of Jan Peter Balkenende to include private land owners and farmers in the management of the Ecologische hoofdstructuur (Ecological Mainstructure). He also criticized CDA state secretary Henk Bleker, who served in the First Rutte cabinet, and ended the completion of the Ecologische hoofdstructuur.

== Later law career and nature conservancy ==
Van Wijmen was professor of nature preservation law at Tilburg University between 2001 and 2008. He simultaneously was member of the Council of State in extraordinary service between 2002 and 2006. At the latter he worked for the administrative law board.

Apart from his work on nature preservation law at the university he also was involved at Brabants Landschap, a nature preservancy organisation in North Brabant. He was chair of the organisation between 1997 and 2005. He was member of the organisation for 43 years.

== Personal life ==
Van Wijmen married in 1964 and had two sons.

Van Wijmen was decorated several times. He was made Officer in the Order of Orange-Nassau on 29 April 1989. He received the Honorary Cross in the Order of the House of Orange in September 1998. Van Wijmen also was Grand Officer in the Belgian Order of Leopold II.

He died on 8 June 2015 in Breda after a short period of illness.

== Works ==
- Natuur, Milieu en Landschap, de cirkel rond – 40 jaar natuurbehoud en milieubeheer/80 jaar Brabants Landschap, 2013
