= Frans Jozef van der Heijden =

Dutch politician and journalist (1938–2016)

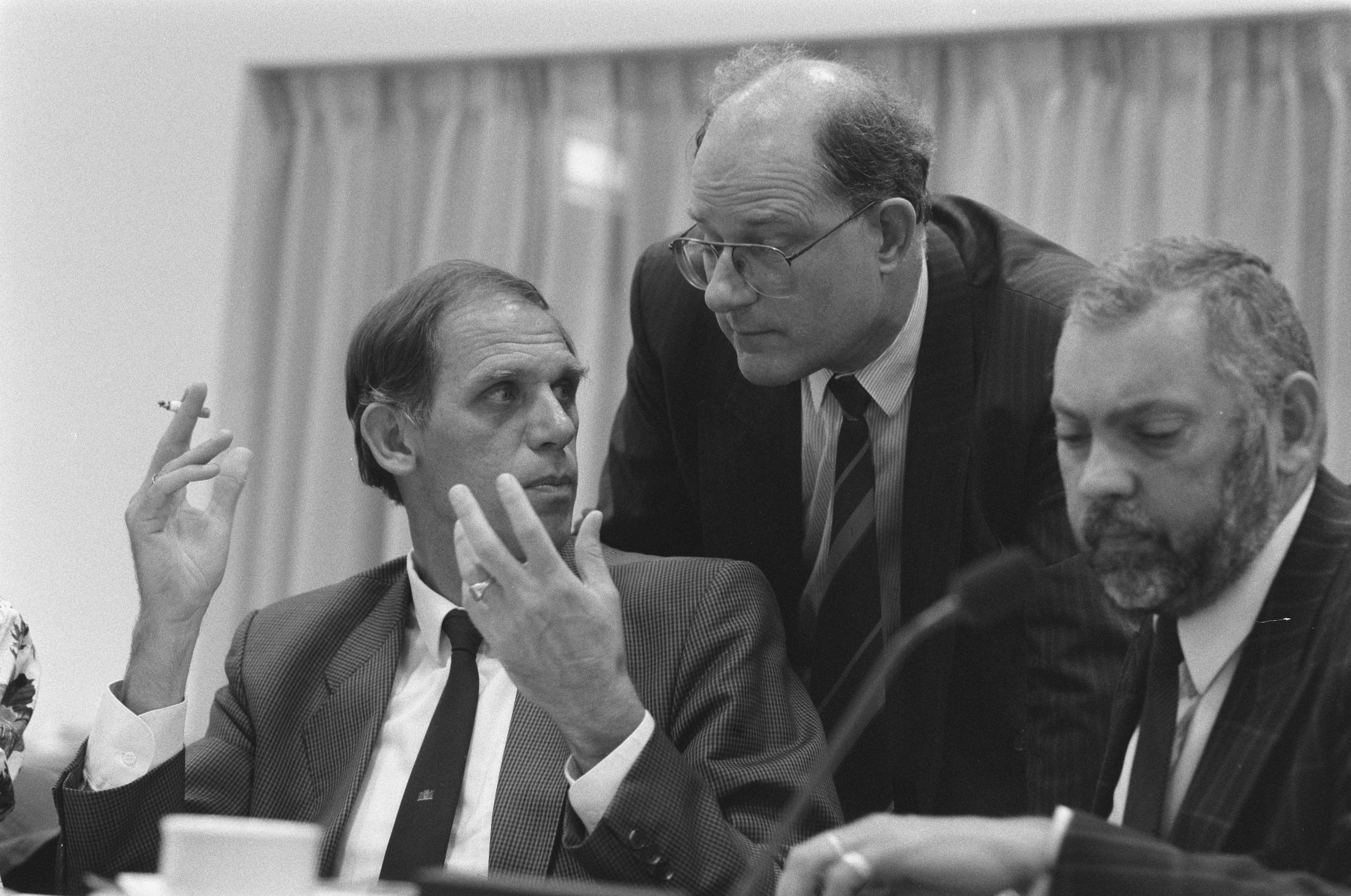
- Van der Heijden (right) in 1988

Member of the municipal council of Rotterdam
- In office 1 September 1970 – 5 September 1978; 14 April 1998 – 14 March 2002; 16 May 2002 – 16 March 2006

Member of the States of South Holland
- In office 7 June 1978 – 1 January 1983

Member of the Rijnmondraad
- In office 25 September 1978 – 28 September 1982

Member of the House of Representatives
- In office 11 November 1982 – 19 May 1998

Personal details
- Born: 20 March 1938 Rotterdam, Netherlands
- Died: 21 October 2016 (aged 78) Rotterdam, Netherlands
- Party: Catholic People's Party (1968–1980), Christian Democratic Appeal (since 1980)

Frans Jozef van der Heijden (20 March 1938 – 21 October 2016) was a Dutch politician. He served as member of the House of Representatives for the Christian Democratic Appeal between 1982 and 1998. Before his time in the House he was active in the municipal politics of Rotterdam and in the States of South Holland.

== Early life and career ==
Van der Heijden was born on 20 March 1938 in Rotterdam. He followed his primary education in Rotterdam and later attended the HBS at the Sint Franciscus College in his hometown.

Van der Heijden started working at the daily De Stem as a journalist in 1960. In 1962 he switched to the De Tijd-De Maasbode, where he would stay until 1972. From 1972 to 1982 he was an editor of the weekly magazine De Nederlandse Gemeente of the Association of Netherlands Municipalities.

== Political career ==
In 1968 he joined the Catholic People's Party. He ran for political office in 1970 and was elected to the municipal council of Rotterdam. Van der Heijden would remain a member until 5 September 1978. He served on the States of South Holland from 7 June 1978 to 1 January 1983 and concurrently was member of the Rijnmondraad from 25 September 1978 to 28 September 1982.

During the 1982 Dutch general election Van der Heijden was elected a member of the House of Representatives for the Christian Democratic Appeal, successor party to the Catholic People's Party. During his time in office Van der Heijden served as spokesperson for internal affairs, police, policy regarding the elderly and mental health care. He served between 11 November 1982 and 19 May 1998.

Near the end of his time the House Van der Heijden returned to the municipal council of Rotterdam, where he was elected on the basis of preferential votes. He served two more terms, from 14 April 1998 to 14 March 2002 and from 16 May 2002 to 16 March 2006. During this time Van der Heijden was part of the commission investigating the expenditures of mayor Bram Peper.

Apart from his political career Van der Heijden served positions on the boards of various institutes and organizations, including the Rotterdam Philharmonic Orchestra and RTV Rijnmond. Van der Heijden was invested as a Knight of the Order of the Netherlands Lion on 28 April 1995 and invested as a Knight of the Order of Orange-Nassau on 18 May 1998.

== Personal life ==
Van der Heijden was raised as a Roman Catholic. He had been married since 1963. On 21 October 2016, Van der Heijden and his wife ended their lives by euthanasia. In their death notice the couple hinted at the Dutch discussion regarding self chosen deaths. They stated that in the discussion there was as of yet no room for saying goodbyes together. The couple had both been suffering from terminal illnesses.
