= Marten Beinema =

Dutch politician (1932–2008)

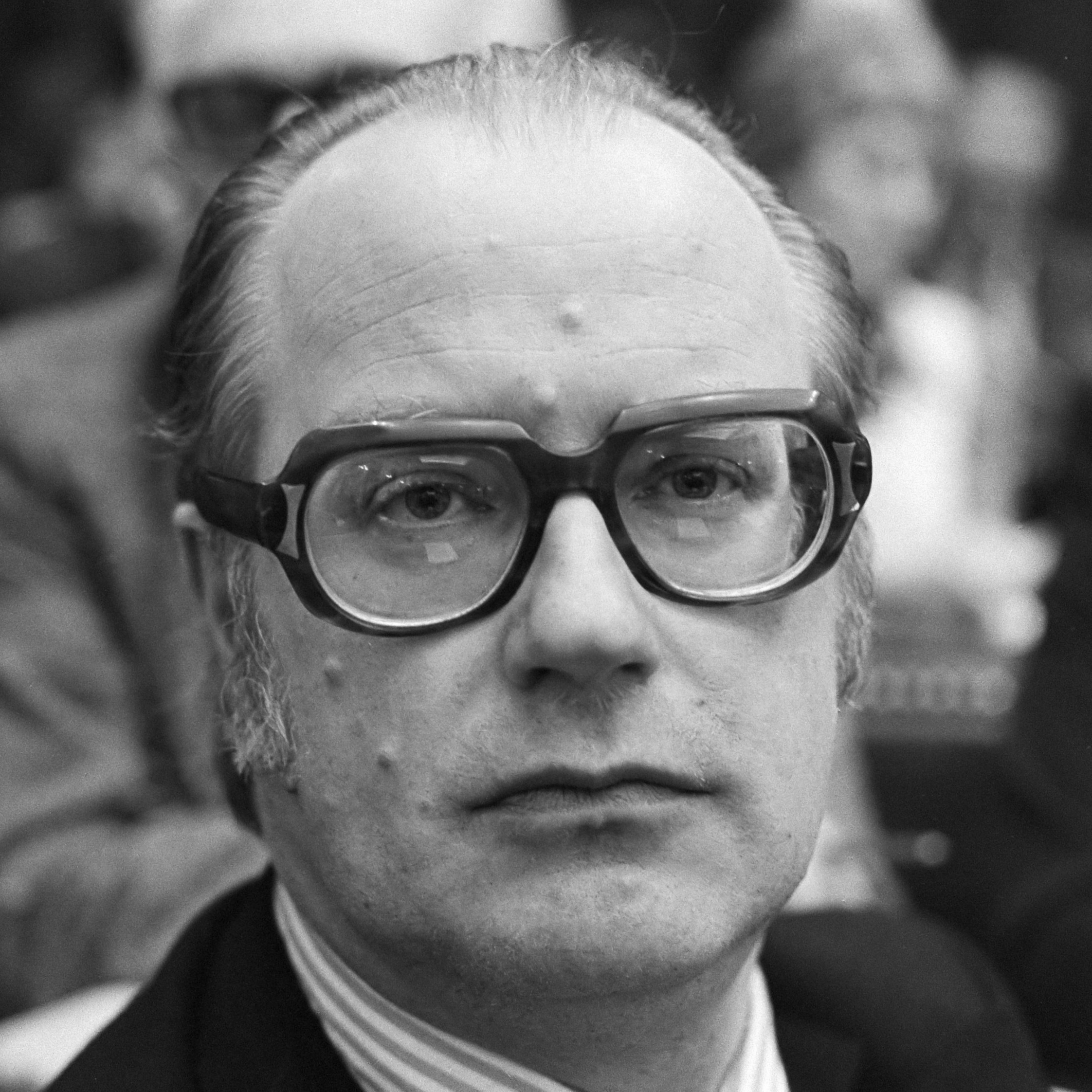
- Marten Beinema in 1977

Member of the House of Representatives
- In office 1975–1977
- In office 1978–1998

Personal details
- Born: 26 November 1932 Dordrecht
- Died: 20 August 2008 (aged 75) Middelburg
- Party: ARP (1971-1980); CDA (1980-2008)
- Education: University of Utrecht

Marten Beinema (26 November 1932 - 20 August 2008) was a Dutch politician who served in the Dutch House of Representatives for the Anti-Revolutionary Party (ARP) and its successor the Christian Democratic Appeal (CDA).

== Biography ==
Beinema was born on 26 November 1932, into a Reformed family. During World War II, his father was a Dutch resistance fighter, who died during the war. He studied the Dutch language at the University of Utrecht, and worked as a Dutch teacher at a secondary school in Middelburg from 1959 to 1978.

Beinema began his career in politics as a member of the municipal council of Middelburg from 1971 to 1978. He was also an alderman of Middelburg from 1972 to 1975. From 1975 to 1977 and again from 1978 to 1998 he was a member of the House of Representatives, serving as the ARP spokesperson on higher education and science and later as CDA spokesperson on media and culture. During the Van Agt and Lubbers cabinets, he was one of several CDA MPs to oppose the placement of American cruise missiles in the Netherlands. In 1980, Beinema also supported an opposition initiative to launch an oil blockade of Apartheid-era South Africa.

From 1978 to 1982 he was also a member of the States of Zeeland.

Beinema was also a chess player and participated in the Tata Steel Chess Tournament.

Marten Beinema died in Middelburg on 20 August 2008.
