= Piet Blauw =

Dutch politician (1937–2019)

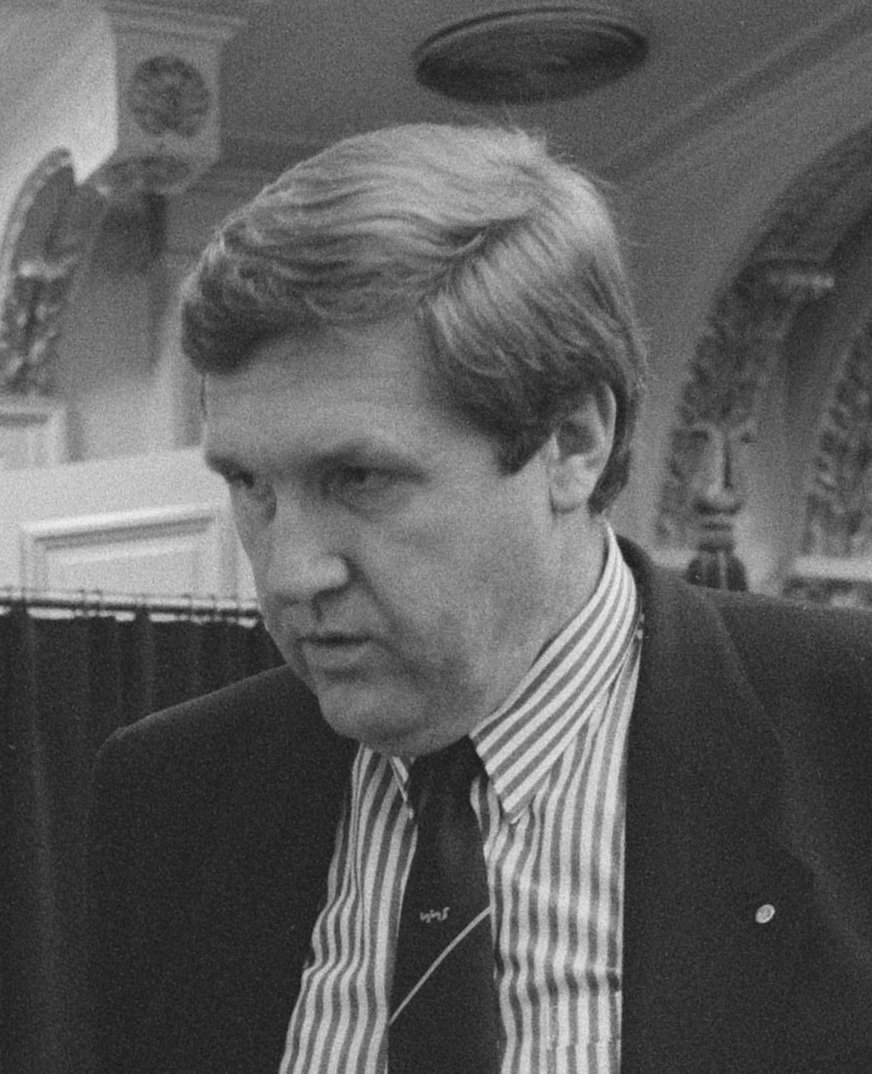
Blauw in 1988

Pieter Marinus "Piet" Blauw (30 September 1937 – 16 May 2019) was a Dutch politician for the People's Party for Freedom and Democracy (VVD). He was born in Alkmaar, North Holland and was a farmer by profession. Blauw was elected to the House of Representatives in 1981, serving until 1998.

Blauw died on 16 May 2019 in Veendam, Groningen, at the age of 81.
