= Hubert Fermina =

Dutch nurse and politician (1948–2022)

Member of House of Representatives
- In office 17 May 1994 – 19 May 1998

Aldermen of Dordrecht
- In office 1990–1994

Member of Dordrecht City council
- In office 1990–1994

Member of Provincial council of South Holland
- In office 1986–1990

Member Lelystad City council
- In office 1974–1981

Personal details
- Born: Hubert Geronimo Fermina; 9 May 1948 Willemstad, Curaçao and Dependencies, Netherlands
- Died: 25 May 2022 (aged 74)
- Party: Democrats 66

Hubert Geronimo Fermina (9 May 1948 – 25 May 2022) was a Dutch nurse and politician. As a member of Democrats 66 he was a member of the municipal council of Lelystad from 1974 to 1981, a member of the States-Provincial of South Holland from 1986 to 1990, a member of the municipal council and also an alderman of Dordrecht from 1990 to 1994, and a member of the House of Representatives from 1994 to 1998.
