= Bob van den Bos =

Dutch politician (born 1947)

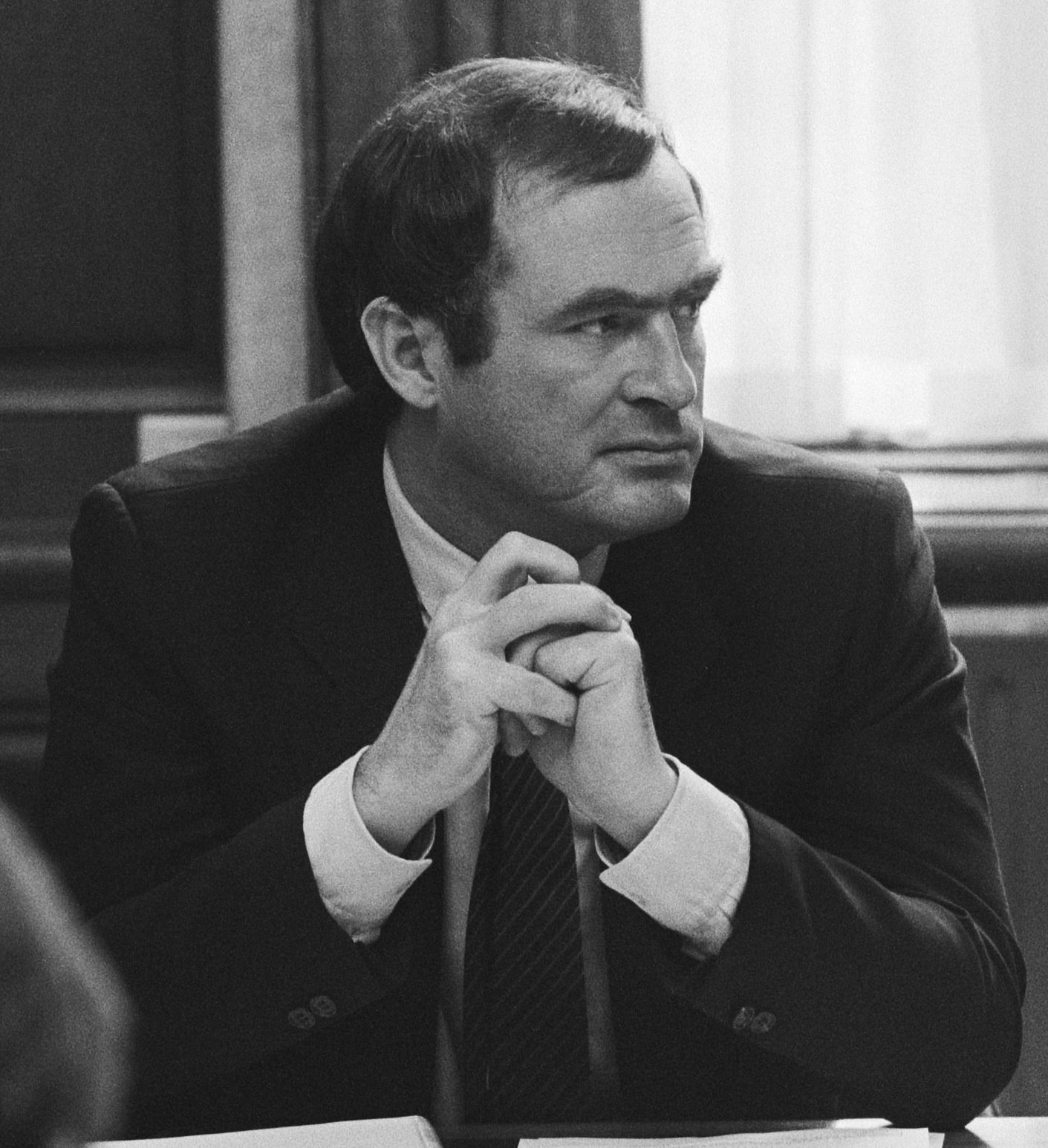
Bob van den Bos

Roland Aaro Bob van den Bos (born 19 December 1947 in The Hague), known as Bob van den Bos, is a Dutch politician.
