= Jos van Rey =

Dutch businessman and politician

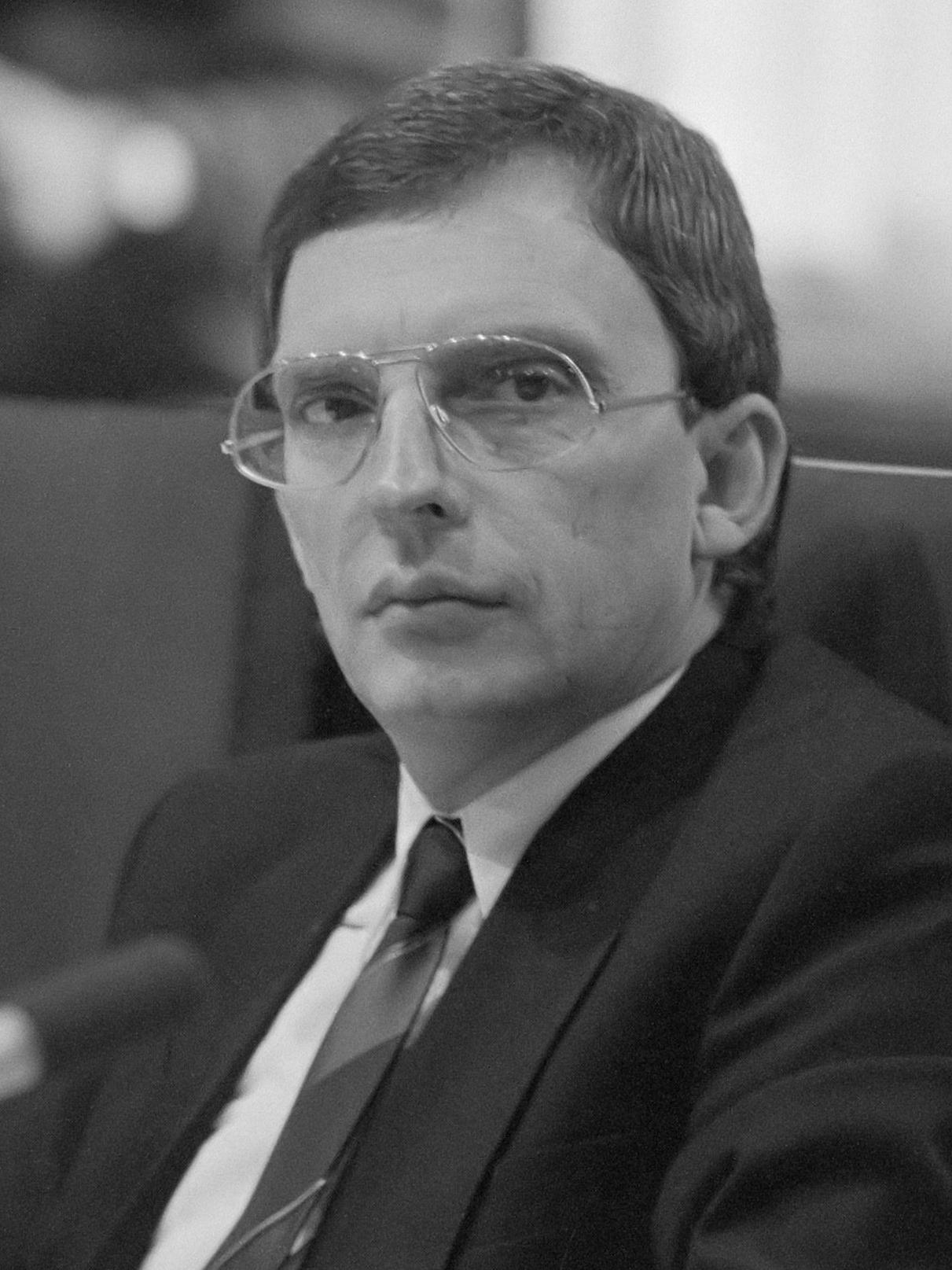
- Jos van Rey in 1987

Member of the States of Limburg
- Incumbent
- Assumed office 26 March 2015
- In office 18 April 1995 – 16 December 2011
- In office 2 June 1982 – October 1982

Member of the municipal council of Roermond
- Incumbent
- Assumed office 27 March 2014
- In office 1 January 1991 – 25 May 2002
- In office 3 September 1974 – 29 April 1986

Member of the Senate
- In office 7 June 2011 – 23 October 2012

Alderman of Roermond
- In office April 1998 – 23 October 2012
- In office November 1979 – October 1982

Member of the House of Representatives
- In office 11 January 1991 – 19 May 1998
- In office 16 September 1982 – 14 September 1989

Personal details
- Born: Jozef Franciscus Bernard van Rey; 15 April 1945 (age 80) Roermond, Netherlands
- Party: Liberal People's Party Roermond (2013–present); People's Party Limburg (2015–present)
- Other political affiliations: People's Party for Freedom and Democracy (1965–2013)

Jozef Franciscus Bernard "Jos" van Rey (Dutch pronunciation: [ˈjoːzə frɑnˈsɪskʏz ˈbɛrnɑrt fɑn ˈrɛi, ˈjɔs fɑn ˈrɛi]; (Note: Jozef, Franciscus and van in isolation: [ˈjoːzəf], [frɑnˈsɪskʏs], [vɑn].) born 15 April 1945) is a Dutch businessman and politician from Roermond. He has been a member of the municipal council of Roermond for the Liberal People's Party Roermond since 2014 and a member of the States of Limburg for the People's Party Limburg since 2015.

For the People's Party for Freedom and Democracy, Van Rey was a member of the municipal council of Roermond (1974–1986; 1991–2002), an alderman of Roermond (1979–1982; 1998–2012), a member of the States of Limburg (1982; 1995–2011), a member of the House of Representatives (1982–1989; 1991–1998), and member of the Senate (2011–2012). In 2013, he was expelled from the People's Party for Freedom and Democracy after co-founding the Liberal People's Party Roermond.

Between 2012 and 2016, he was investigated for political corruption. In 2016 and 2017, he was convicted for bribery, disclosure of confidential information, electoral fraud, and money laundering. He received a suspended prison sentence of one year and was disqualified to hold public office for two years.

Since then, his Liberal People's Party Roermond has become the largest party in Roermond in every municipal election, and Van Rey is always elected to the council with preferential votes as the list pusher. This was also the case in the elections of March 18, 2022.

== Early life ==
Jozef Franciscus Bernard van Rey was born on 15 April 1945 in Roermond in the Netherlands.

== Business ==
Van Rey has worked in insurance since 1965. He founded an insurance company named after himself, Jos van Rey, and was director between 1975 and October 1982. He is the owner of a real estate company named after himself, Jos van Rey Vastgoed BV.

== Politics ==
Van Rey became a member of the People's Party for Freedom and Democracy in 1965.

Between 1974 and 2012, he had several and sometimes concurrent positions in the municipality of Roermond, the province of Limburg, and the Netherlands for the People's Party for Freedom and Democracy. He was a member of the municipal council of Roermond (1974–1986; 1991–2002), an alderman of Roermond (1979–1982; 1998–2012), a member of the States of Limburg (1982; 1995–2011), a member of the House of Representatives (1982–1989; 1991–1998), and member of the Senate (2011–2012).

Following the start of the investigation into political corruption in 2012, Van Rey resigned as alderman and senator.

In 2013, he co-founded the Liberal People's Party Roermond (LVR), after which he was expelled from the People's Party for Freedom and Democracy (VVD) due to a conflict of interest. In 2014, Van Rey was installed as a member of the Municipal Council in Roermond for the LVR.

In 2015, he was installed as a member of the States of Limburg for the People's Party Limburg.

== Corruption investigation and conviction ==
Between 2012 and 2016, Van Rey was investigated for political corruption and prosecuted for bribery, disclosure of confidential information, and electoral fraud. The criminal trial started in the court of Rotterdam on 4 April 2016. Van Rey was convicted for two counts of bribery, one count of disclosure of confidential information, and one count of electoral fraud and he received a community sentence of 240 hours on 12 July 2016. On 20 December 2017, the Court of Appeal of The Hague gave Van Rey a twelve months' suspended prison sentence and disqualified him from holding public office for the duration of two years, for bribery, disclosure of confidential information, electoral fraud and money laundering.
