= Frans Wolters =

Dutch politician

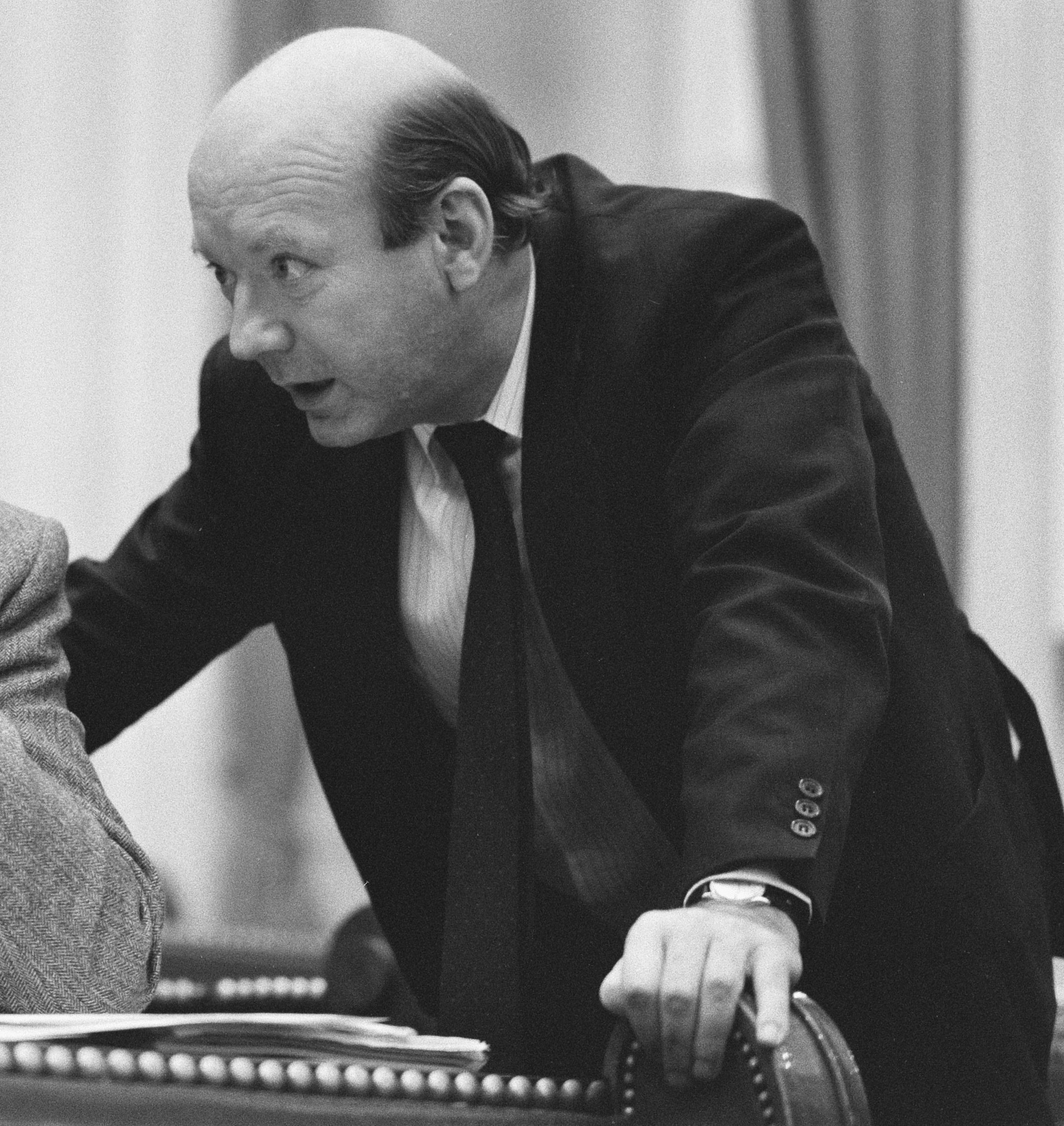
Dutch politician Frans Wolters in 1987

Franciscus Leonardus Antonius Johannes (Frans) Wolters (21 October 1943 in Venlo – 9 February 2005 in Venlo) was a Dutch politician. From 1981 to 1998 he was a member of the House of Representatives of the Netherlands for the Christian Democratic Appeal (CDA). He also was a member and an alderman of the municipal council of Venlo and mayor ad int. of Horst aan de Maas.
