= Servaas Huys =

Dutch politician (1940–2016)

Member of the House of Representatives
- In office 3 June 1986 – 17 May 1994; 30 August 1994 – 19 May 1998

Member of the States of Limburg
- In office 7 June 1978 – 3 June 1986

Member of the municipal council of Grubbenvorst
- In office 3 September 1974 – 1 September 1978

Personal details
- Born: 26 March 1940 Grubbenvorst, Netherlands
- Died: 22 November 2016 (aged 76) Grubbenvorst, Netherlands
- Party: Labour Party

Jozef Servaas Huys (26 March 1940 – 22 November 2016) was a Dutch politician. A member of the Labour Party, he served in the House of Representatives between 1986 and 1998. He previously served on the local and provincial political levels of his native Limburg.

== Career ==
Huys was born on 26 March 1940 in Grubbenvorst. He attended schools in his hometown and Venlo. Huys was a teacher from 1963 to 1965. He subsequently became a worker in sociocultural training, between 1969 and 1975 he was director of sociocultural training center. From 1976 to 1979 Huys was a teacher at a school for lower economic and administrative education. From 1979 to 1986 he was part-time director at Sociocultural Training Center for Working Young People.

Huys started his political career for the Labour Party in the municipal council of his hometown, Grubbenvorst. He was a member from 3 September 1974 to 1 September 1978. On 7 June 1978 he became a member of the States of Limburg. Huys would continue to serve until 3 June 1986, when he started as member of the House of Representatives. He was a member until 17 May 1994 and subsequently from 30 August 1994 to 19 May 1998. In the House he dealt primarily with agriculture, fisheries and education. After his time in office Huys held a list of administrative positions. From 1998 to 2010 he also served as chair on a commission regarding the Peelvenen, an area encompassing the Mariapeel.

Huys was invested as a Knight of the Order of Orange-Nassau on 18 May 1998. He died in Grubbenvorst on 22 November 2016, after suffering from a long illness.
