= Dick Stellingwerf =

Dutch politician

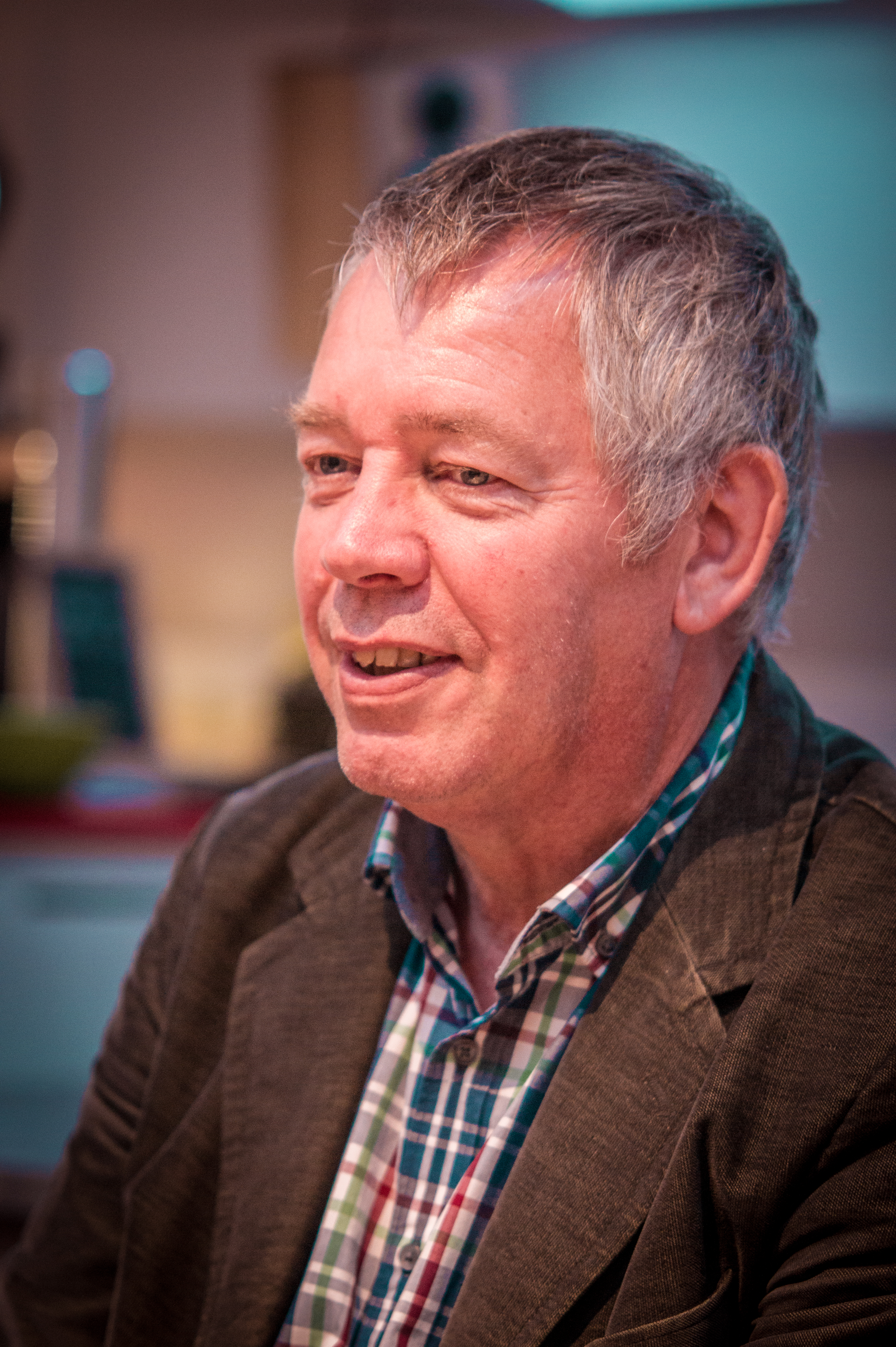
Dick Stellingwerf

Dirk Jacobus "Dick" Stellingwerf (born 23 May 1953 in Utrecht) is a Dutch politician of the Reformatory Political Federation (RPF) and his successor the ChristianUnion (ChristenUnie). He was an MP from 1994 to 2002. From 2008 to 2013 he was mayor of Lemsterland, and from 2015 to 2017 acting mayor of Schiermonnikoog.

Stellingwerf was a municipal councillor as well as an alderman of Ede, and a member of the provincial parliament of Gelderland.

He is a member of the Netherlands Reformed Churches.
