= Pieter Hofstra =

Dutch politician (1946–2025)

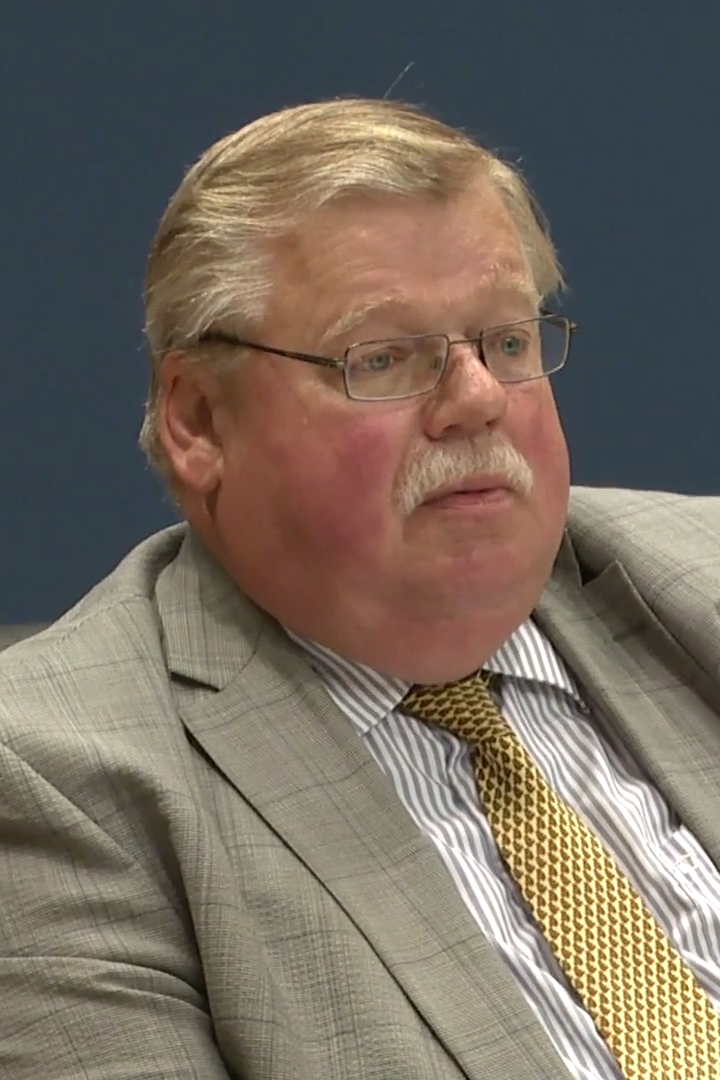
- Hofstra in 2014

Member of the Senate
- In office 12 June 2007 – 6 June 2011

Member of the House of Representatives
- In office 8 September 1994 – 29 November 2006

Personal details
- Born: Pieter Hielke Hofstra; 24 September 1946 Groningen, Netherlands
- Died: 2 January 2025 (aged 78) Heerenveen, Netherlands
- Party: People's Party for Freedom and Democracy

Pieter Hielke Hofstra (Dutch: [ˈpitər ˈɦɔfstraː]; 24 September 1946 – 2 January 2025) was a Dutch politician of the conservative-liberal People's Party for Freedom and Democracy (VVD).

== Life and career ==
Hofstra was born in 1946 in Groningen, and he studied railway engineering. He was a member of the House of Representatives from 1994 to 2006, where he focused on traffic, public transport, and construction. He advocated for constructing new roads and improving public transport, and he was in favor of increasing the speed limit and implementing a system of distance-based road pricing. Hofstra was a member of the Senate from 2007 to 2011. He died in Heerenveen on 2 January 2025, at the age of 78.
