= Jan Rijpstra =

Dutch politician

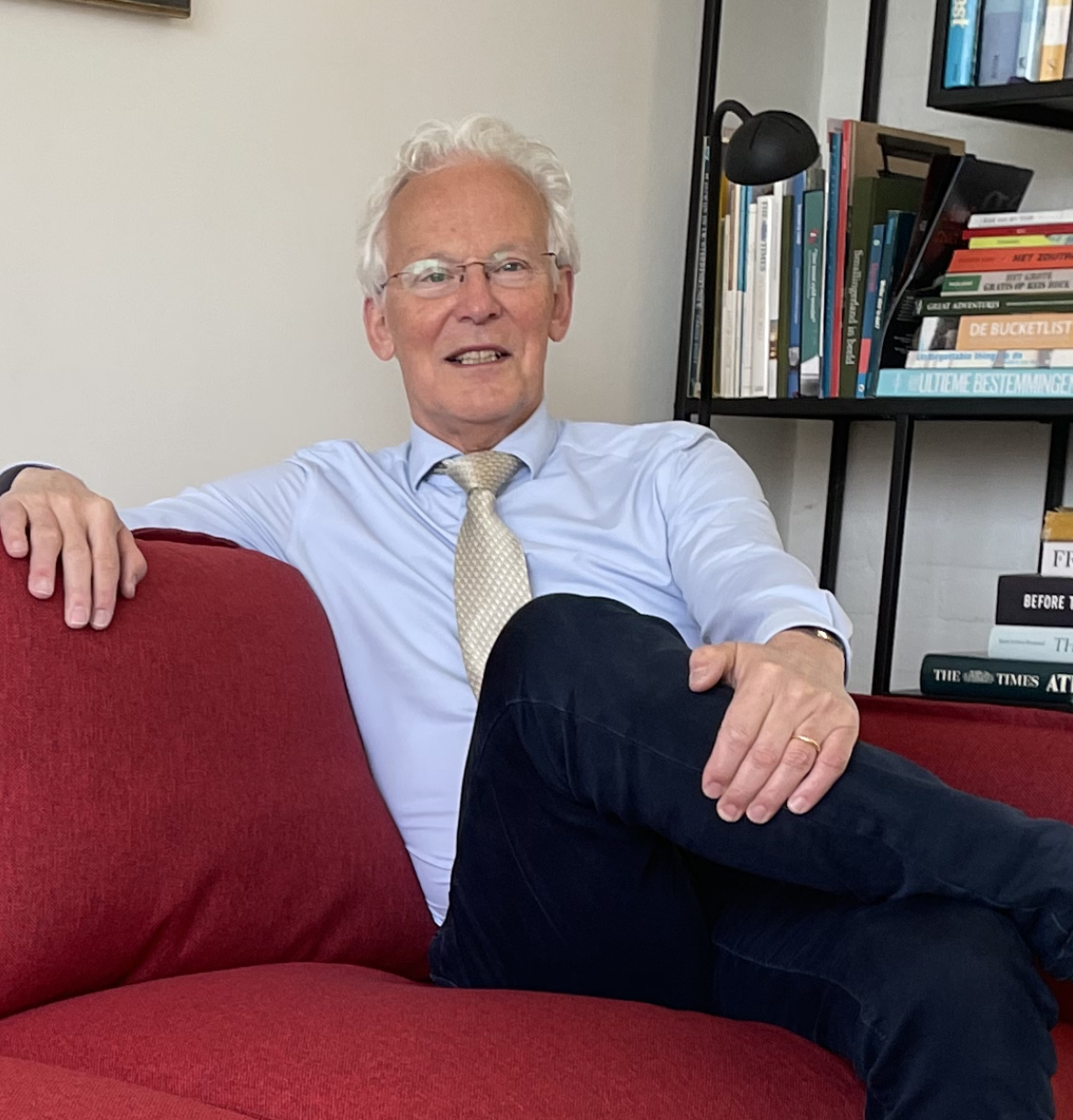
Jan Rijpstra

Johannes (Jan) Rijpstra (born 15 July 1955, Gouda) is a Dutch politician from the VVD party. He was mayor of Smallingerland from 2019 to 2024.

From 2005 till 2008 Rijpstra was mayor of Tynaarlo. He was subsequently the mayor of Noordwijk from 2014 until 1 January 2019, when Noordwijk was merged with Noordwijkerhout. He was also a member of the Dutch House of Representatives from 1994 to 2005.

Rijpstra has a degree in physical education from the Hanze University of Applied Sciences in Groningen.
