= Koos van den Berg =

Dutch politician (1942–2020)

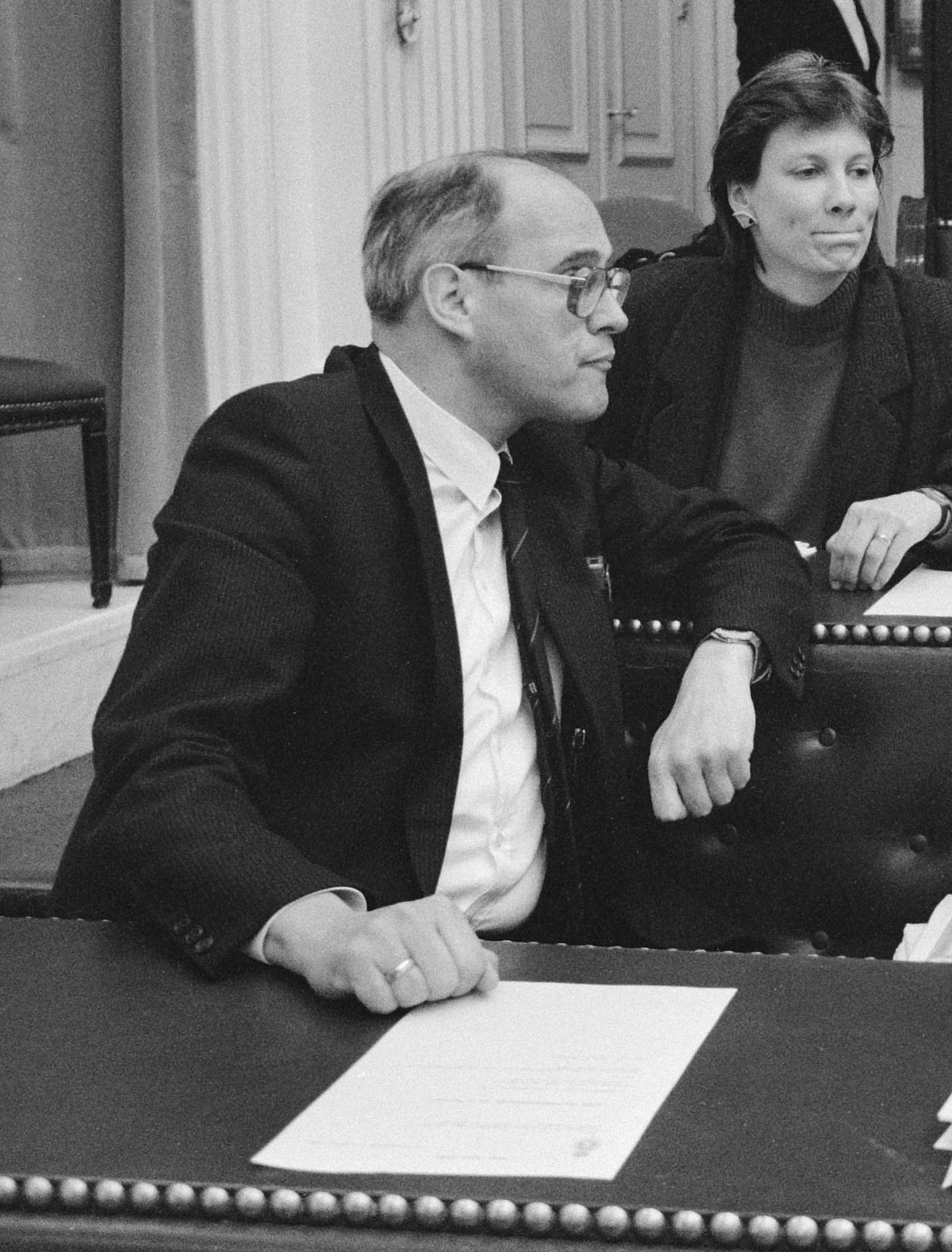

Member of the House of Representatives
- In office 3 June 1986 – 23 May 2002

Personal details
- Born: Jacobus Teunis van den Berg; 18 September 1942 The Hague, Netherlands
- Died: 21 April 2020 (aged 77) Nunspeet, Netherlands
- Party: Reformed Political Party (SGP)

Jacobus Teunis "Koos" van den Berg (18 September 1942 – 21 April 2020) was a Dutch politician of the Reformed Political Party (SGP). Born in The Hague, he served as a member of the House of Representatives from 3 June 1986 to 23 May 2002.

On 21 April 2020, during the COVID-19 pandemic in the Netherlands, Van den Berg died in Nunspeet due to complications from COVID-19, at the age of 77.
