= Adri Duivesteijn =

Dutch politician (1950–2023)

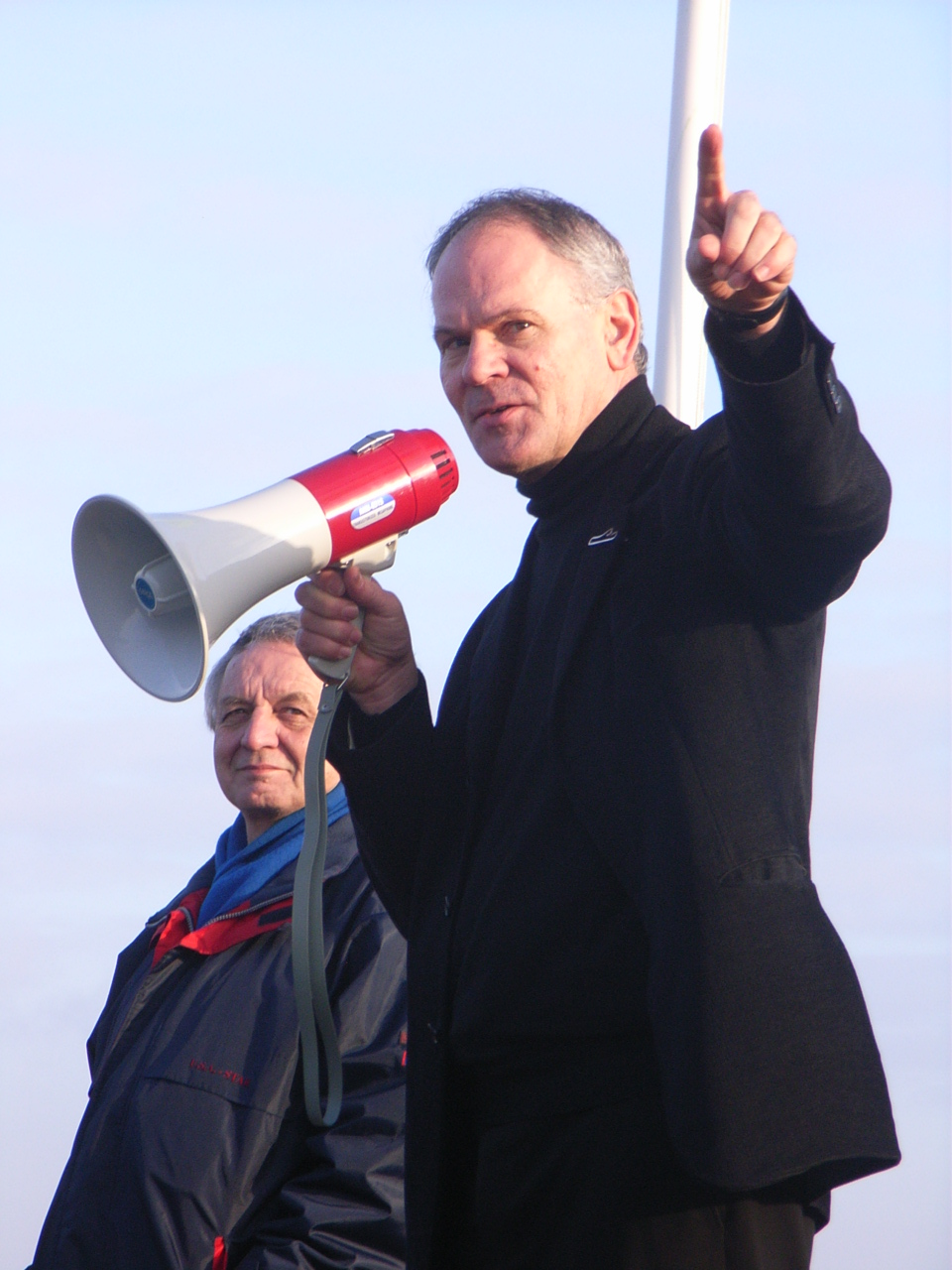
Duivesteijn in 2007

Adrianus Theodorus "Adri" Duivesteijn (Dutch pronunciation: [ˈaːdri ˈdœyvəstɛin]; 27 August 1950 – 17 March 2023) was a Dutch politician from the Labour Party. He served as a member of the House of Representatives and the Senate.

Duivesteijn died from prostate cancer on 17 March 2023, at the age of 72.
