= Francisca Ravestein =

Dutch politician (1952–2024)

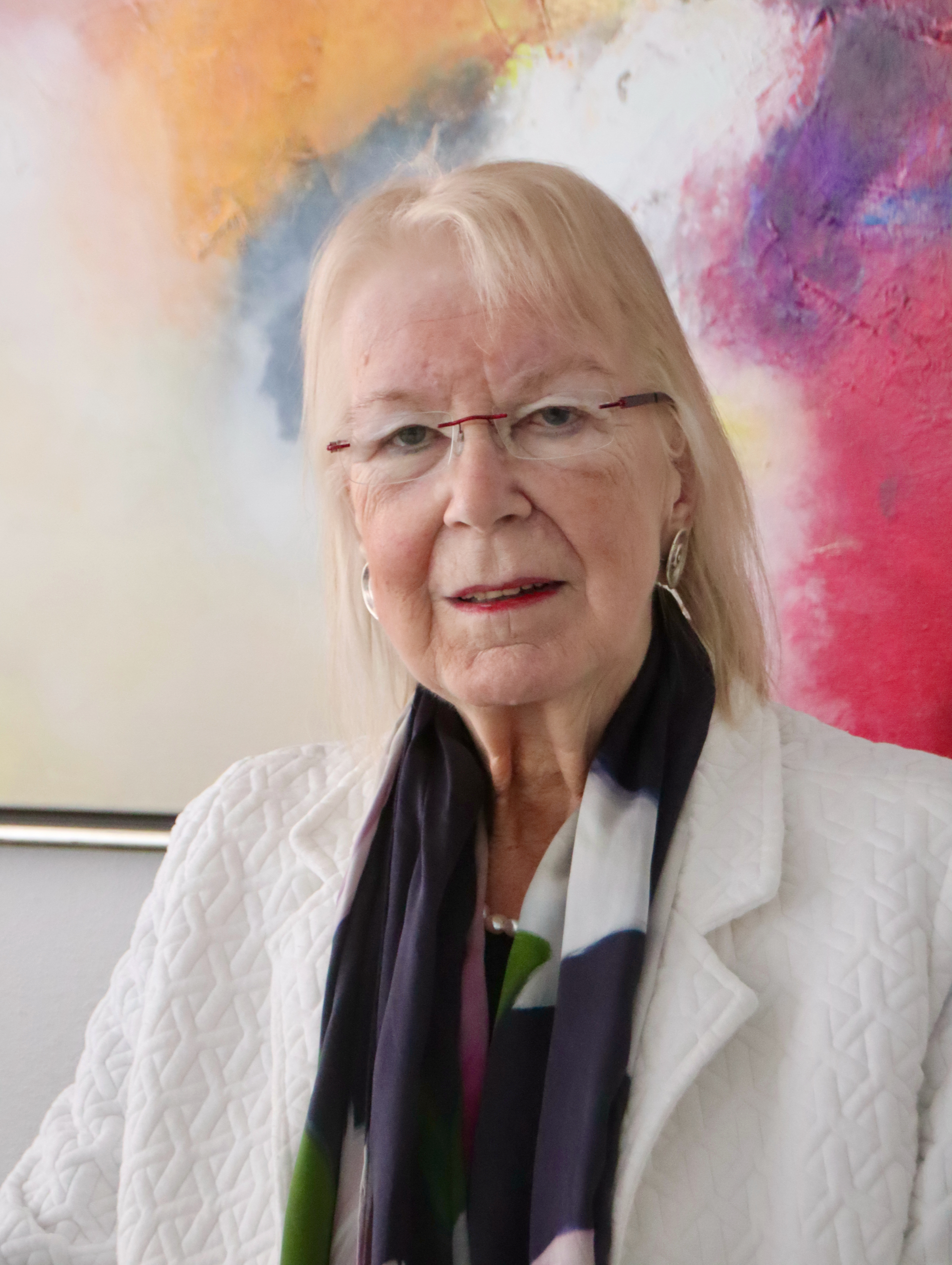
- Born: 26 October 1952; Leiden, Netherlands
- Died: 7 January 2024 (aged 71); Pijnacker
- Occupation: Politician

Francisca Ravestein (26 October 1952 – 7 January 2024) was a Dutch politician who served in the House of Representatives between 1998 and 2002 for the Democrats 66. She was also on the Executive Council of the International Wheelchair Basketball Federation. Ravestein died on 7 January 2024, at the age of 71.
