= Ruud Luchtenveld =

Dutch politician

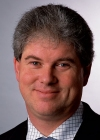
Ruud Luchtenveld

Ruud Luchtenveld (born 8 May 1956 in Amersfoort) is a Dutch politician of the People's Party for Freedom and Democracy (VVD). He has been an alderman of Lelystad since 2010. Previously he was an alderman in Amersfoort from 1986 to 1990, from 1994 to 1997 and from 2006 until 2010. With small interruptions he was also an MP from 1997 to 2006. Between April 1991 and April 1995 he was also a member of the Provincial Council of Utrecht.
