= Saskia Noorman-den Uyl =

Dutch politician

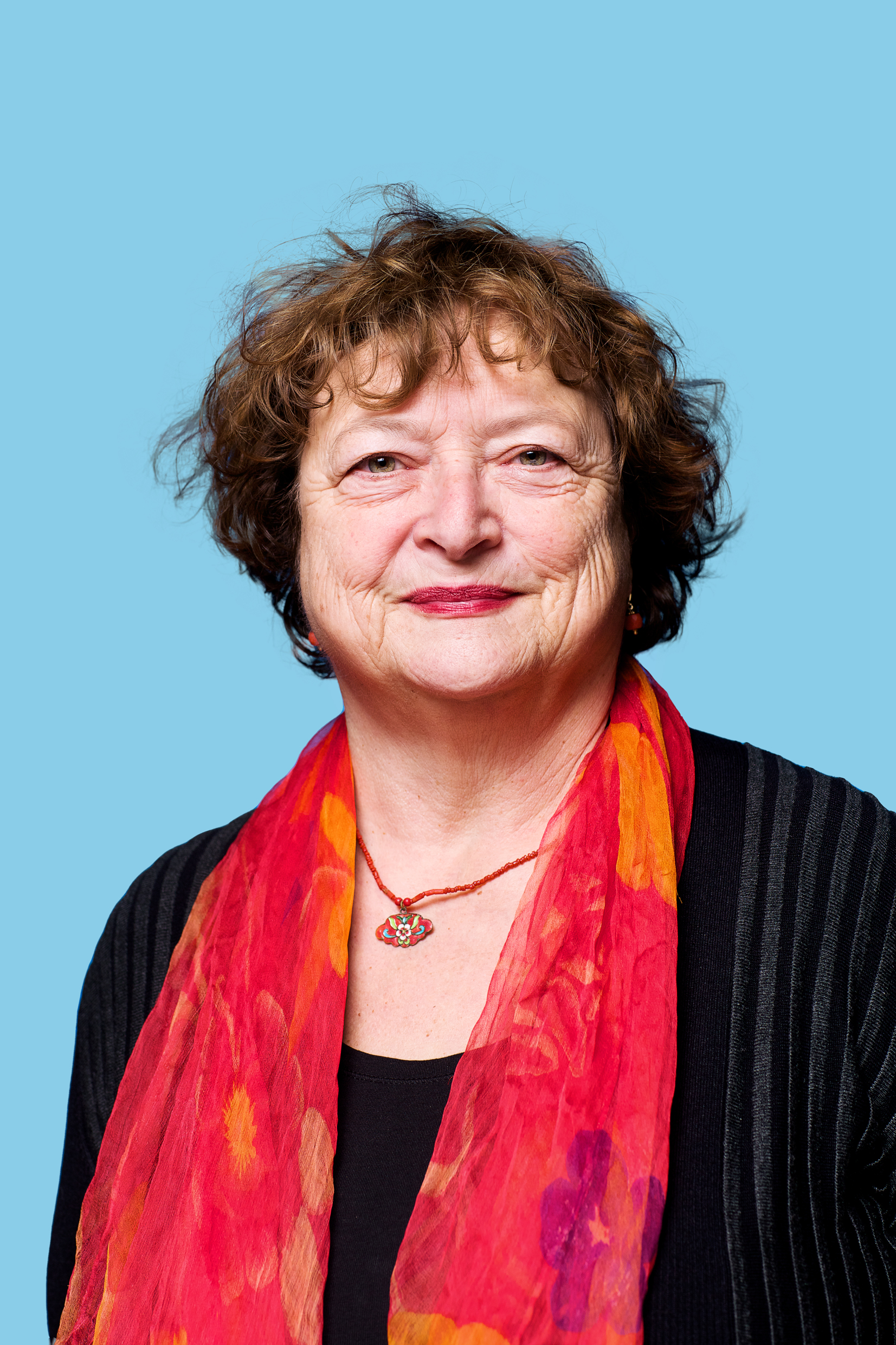
- Saskia Noorman-den Uyl in 2015

Member of the House of Representatives of the Netherlands
- In office 17 May 1994 – 30 November 2006

Personal details
- Born: Saskia Elisabeth Agatha den Uijl; 31 March 1946 (age 80) Amsterdam, Netherlands
- Party: Labour Party (from 1974)
- Education: Gerrit Rietveld Academie (Bachelor of Architecture, Master of Architecture); Vrije Universiteit Amsterdam (Bachelor of Engineering, Master of Engineering)
- Occupation: Politician civil servant architect

Saskia Elisabeth Agatha Noorman-den Uyl (born 31 March 1946) is a retired Dutch politician of the Labour Party (PvdA).

Noorman-den Uyl served as a Member of the House of Representatives from 17 May 1994 until 30 November 2006. She is the oldest daughter of former Prime Minister of the Netherlands Joop den Uyl.
