= Monique de Vries =

Dutch politician

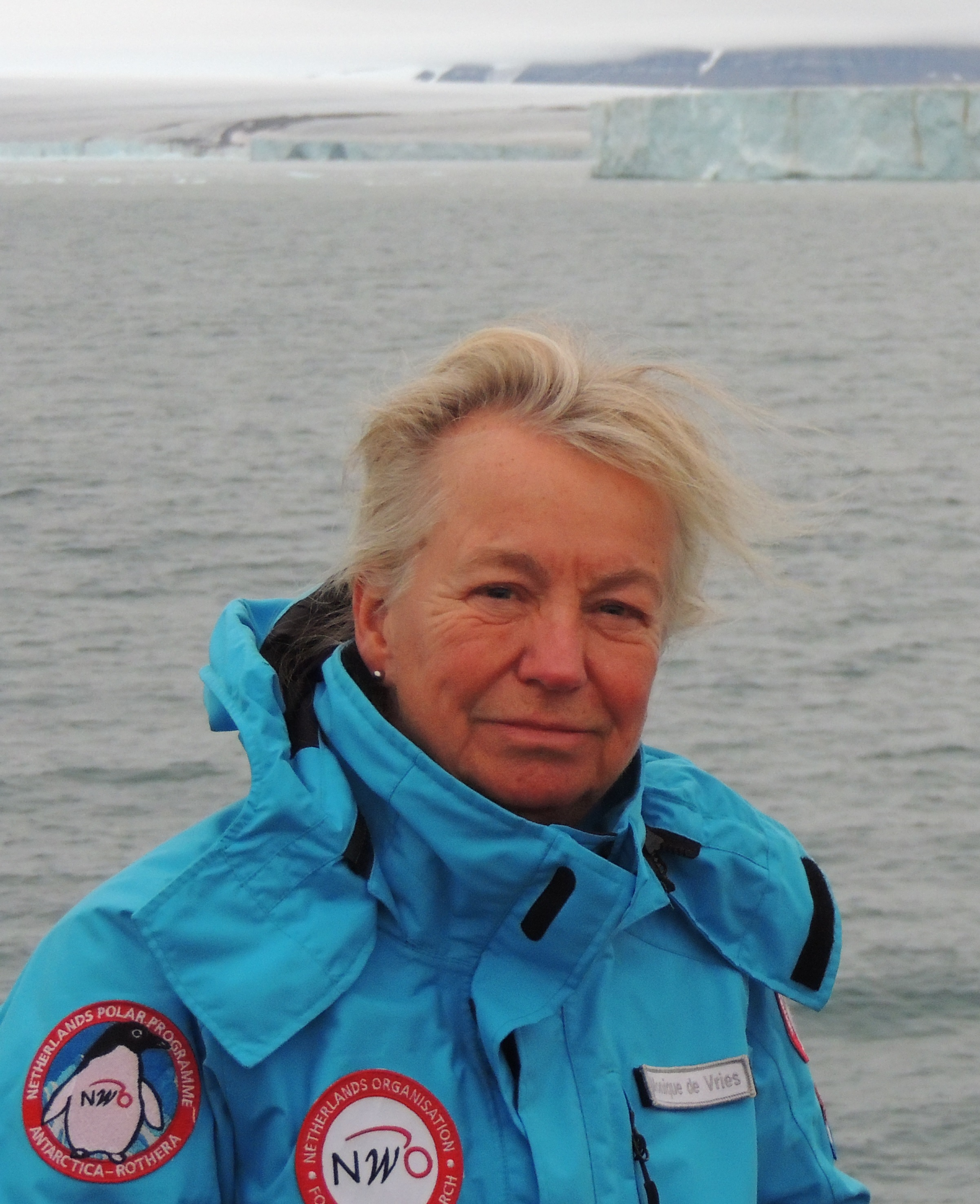
- Born: 16 August 1947 (age 79)
- Education: Leiden University
- Political party: People's Party for Freedom and Democracy

Monique de Vries (born 16 August 1947) is a Dutch politician and has been with the People's Party for Freedom and Democracy since 1973. From the period 1994-2003 she was the Secretary of State of Transport, Public Works and Water Management. and a member of the House of Representatives.

== Early life and education ==
De Vries was born in The Hague on 16 August 1947. After grammar school she studied Italian Language and Literature at Leiden University, receiving her master's degree in 1973. From 1976 on she was active in the Liberal Party as chair of the Liberal Women's Organization, member of The Hague's municipal council, MP and state secretary for Transport, Public Works and Water Management.

== Career and impact ==
De Vries was the president of the Women's organisation of the VVD in 1994 and from 1990-1994 she was a member of the Hague municipal council.

De Vries visited Antarctica in 1999 as Vice-Minister for Water Management for the Dutch government. During this journey the polar region impressed her greatly. From 2003 until 2010 she was chair of the Steering Committee for the Netherlands Polar Programme. From 2010 until September 2016 she was chair of the Netherlands Polar Committee.

She played a crucial role behind the scenes for Dutch polar research in her role persuading Members of parliament and Members of government to contribute to the Netherlands Polar Programme, during the five-yearly negotiations for new budget for this research programme both in 2010 and 2015.
