= Gerrit Ybema =

Dutch politician (1945–2012)

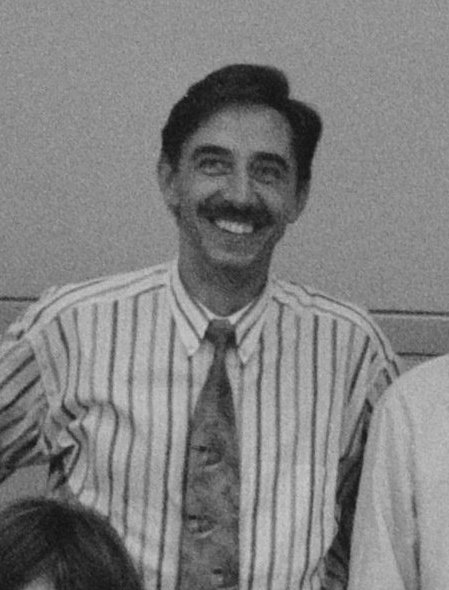

State Secretary for Economic Affairs (Netherlands)
- In office 3 August 1998 – 22 July 2002
- Prime Minister: Wim Kok
- Preceded by: Anneke van Dok-van Weele
- Succeeded by: Joop Wijn

Member of the House of Representatives
- In office 14 September 1989 – 3 August 1998

Personal details
- Born: Gerrit Ybema; 29 October 1945 Schettens, Netherlands
- Died: 15 February 2012 (aged 66) Uitwellingerga, Netherlands
- Party: Democrats 66
- Spouse(s): Johanna Henderika Andela (until 1974); Jelske Hekstra (until 2012)
- Education: University of Groningen (M.Sc. in Economics)
- Occupation: Politician; Civil servant Management consultant Entrepreneur

Gerrit Ybema (29 October 1945 – 15 February 2012) was a Dutch politician in the Democrats 66 (D66) party. He served as a Member of the House of Representatives from 14 September 1989 to 3 August 1998, when he became State Secretary for Economic Affairs in the Second Kok cabinet, serving until 22 July 2002.

Born in Schettens, Ybema studied economics at University of Groningen. He graduated cum laude in 1977. After working at Enschede municipality, he moved to Friesland province in 1986 to become advisor to its Gedeputeerde Staten.

He was member of political party Democraten 66 and was elected to the municipal council of Leeuwarden. In 1989 he was elected to the House of Representatives. In his latter years, Ybema owned a consultancy company named Ybema Economy Solutions.

== Personal life ==
Ybema was married and lived in the Frisian village Uitwellingerga. He had three children with his first wife. His second wife had two children out of her first marriage.

=== Decorations ===
- Order of Oranje-Nassau
  - Knight (December 10, 2002)

== Notes ==
Government offices
Preceded by Anneke van Dok-van Weele	State Secretary for Economic Affairs; 1998-2002	Succeeded by Joop Wijn
