= Thanasis Apostolou =

Greek-Dutch former politician

- Thanasis Apostolou in 1989

Member of the House of Representatives
- In office 14 September 1989 – 19 May 1998
- In office 25 August 1998 – 23 May 2002

Personal details
- Born: Athanasios Apostolou; 24 January 1946 (age 80) Trygona, Greece
- Party: PvdA
- Children: 3
- Education: National and Kapodistrian University of Athens; University of Amsterdam (Doctorate)

Athanasios "Thanasis" Apostolou (born 24 January 1946) is a Greek-Dutch theologian and former politician. From 1989 to 2002, he was a member of the Dutch House of Representatives for the Labour Party (PvdA). As an MP, he became known for his disagreements with the party on social issues such as same-sex marriage and the legalization of euthanasia.

== Early life ==
Thanasis Apostolou was born on 24 January 1946, in the village of Trygona, located near Meteora in Greece. At the age of 12, Apostolou had to leave home to attend a secondary school, located in Trikala. He then studied theology at the National Kapodistrian University of Athens, graduating in 1968. Apostolou intended on becoming a teacher, but found it impossible to find work due to the high level of unemployment in Greece at the time. Apostolou applied for a scholarship from the World Council of Churches to study theology in the Netherlands, as he knew a girl there, whom he would later marry. He also served as a soldier in the Greek Army during the Greek junta.

Apostolou first moved to the Netherlands in 1971. After working for five years at a school in Driebergen, Apostolou and a family attempted to settle in Greece. The family moved to Crete, where Apostolou had found work as a teacher, but they moved back to the Netherlands after a year following conflicts over his work contract. In 1977, Apostolou gained Dutch citizenship. A year later, he began work for a foundation for foreign workers in the middle of the Netherlands, located in Utrecht.

== Political career ==
In 1983, Apostolou joined the Labour Party (PvdA), with the intention of voicing the concerns of migrants. Apostolou first became a member of the House of Representatives following the 1989 Dutch general election. He was one of the first MPs of foreign descent in the House of Representatives during this period, along with John Lilipaly. As an MP, Apostolou focused mainly on minority issues, asylum and migration, drugs policy, youth policy, police and defense.

In 1992, Apostolou was one of nine PvdA MPs who voted against the implementation agreement of the Schengen Agreement. As the PvdA's parliamentary spokesperson on minority issues, Apostolou called for limiting the yearly inflow of migrants to a maximum of 50,000 in 1993, citing the perceived need to solve unemployment among Dutch people first.

In the late 1990s, Apostolou became known for his differences in opinion with the rest of his colleagues in the PvdA. In 1999, Apostolou was the only PvdA MP to support a motion calling for an end to the NATO bombardement of Serbia. Apostolou opposed same-sex marriage, according to himself not for religious reasons but because of what he viewed as the societal importance of the family and the need to "not raise a trend to the level of a norm", warning that legalization would lead to also allowing polygamy. In 2000, he was the only PvdA MP to vote against same-sex marriage. That same year, Apostolou also voted against the legalization of euthanasia. Apostolou faced opposition from his colleagues in the PvdA, likening it to serving as a soldier under the Greek junta. In 2002, Apostolou left the House of Representatives.

== Later life ==
Since leaving politics, Apostolou has been active on drug policy issues, serving as director of Diogenes - Drug Policy Dialogue in South East Europe from 2003 to 2021.

== Personal life ==
Apostolou married a teacher in Grijpskerk on 29 June 1971. He has two sons and one daughter.

Apostolou is a Knight in the Order of Orange-Nassau.
