= Stefanie van Vliet =

Dutch politician (born 1967)

Stefanie van Vliet (born 28 February 1967 in Amsterdam) is a Dutch politician of Democrats 66.

She was an MP from 1994 until 2002.
