= Margo Vliegenthart =

Dutch politician

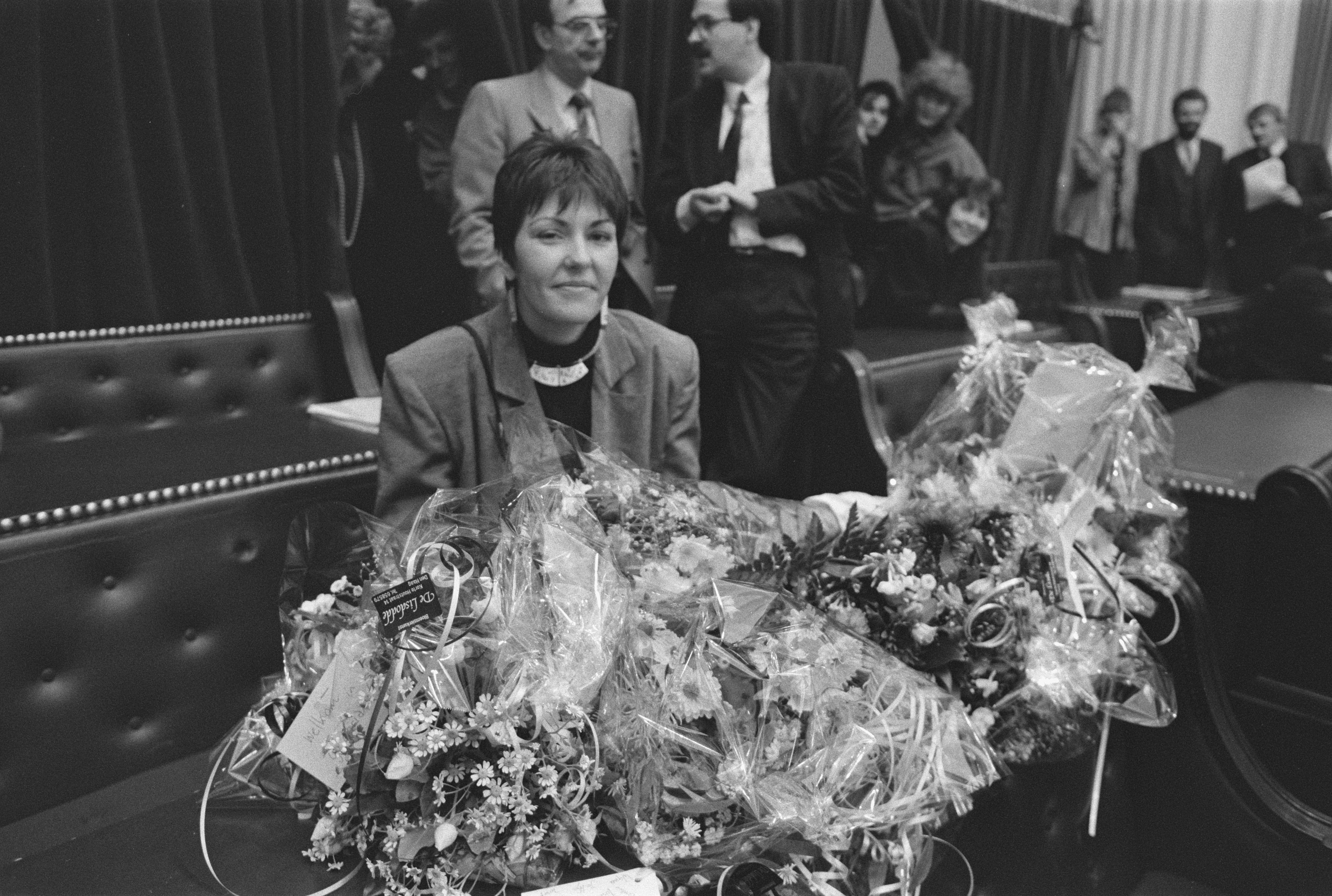
Margo Vliegenthart (1987)

Anne Margot (Margo) Vliegenthart (born 18 July 1958 in Utrecht) is a Dutch former politician.
