= Pieter ter Veer =

Dutch politician (1944–2022)

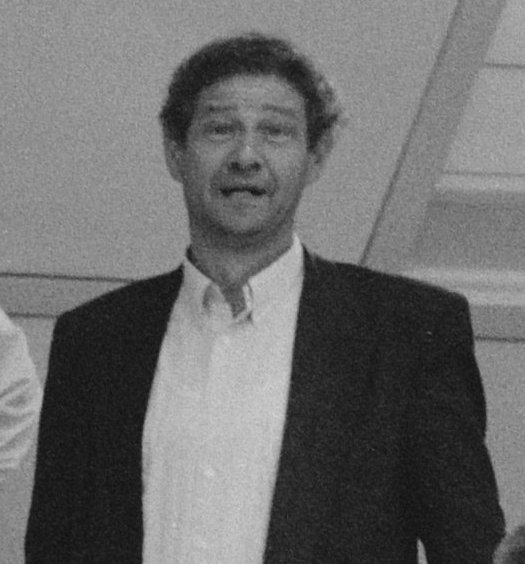
- Ter Veer in 1989

Member of the House of Representatives of the Netherlands
- In office 14 September 1989 – 23 May 2002
- In office 10 June 1981 – 15 September 1982

Personal details
- Born: Pieter Klaas ter Veer; 22 December 1944 Zuidhorn, German-occupied Netherlands
- Died: 11 December 2022 (aged 77) Heemstede, Netherlands
- Party: D66
- Education: Wageningen University & Research
- Occupation: Farmer

Pieter Klaas ter Veer (22 December 1944 – 11 December 2022) was a Dutch dairy farmer and politician. A member of the Democrats 66, he served in the House of Representatives from 1981 to 1982 and again from 1989 to 2002.

Ter Veer died in Heemstede on 11 December 2022, at the age of 77.
