= Rob Oudkerk =

Dutch politician and general practitioner

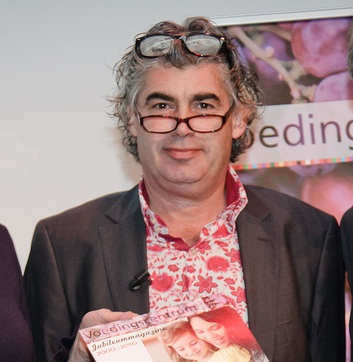
Rob Oudkerk

Robert Herman Oudkerk (born 20 March 1955) is a Dutch politician and general practitioner. Oudkerk was born in Amsterdam. He was the son of a Jewish butcher and a nurse. His grandfather was David Cohen, who was President of the Jewish Council during World War II. He has served as a member of the Dutch House of Representatives for the Dutch Labour Party and as alderman of education in Amsterdam. During his time as a local politician in Amsterdam, he was beset by scandals, such as that he frequented a streetwalking zone for drug-addicted prostitutes, while still being a general practitioner.

When the Labour Party formed an electoral alliance with GroenLinks in the early 2020s, Oudkerk supported Rood Vooruit, an initiative founded in 2023 that has been critical of merger plans.
