= Olga Scheltema-de Nie =

Dutch scientist and politician (1939–2023)

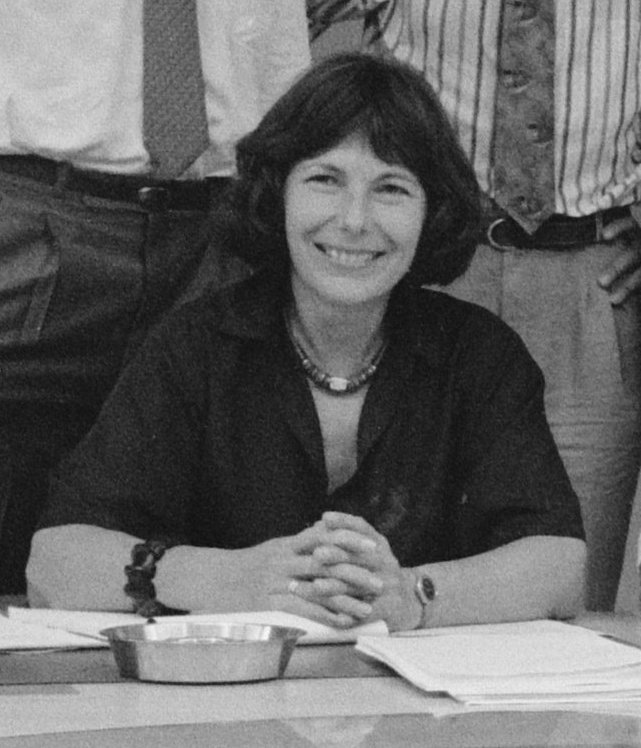
- Nie in 1989

Member of the House of Representatives of the Netherlands
- In office 14 September 1989 – 23 May 2002

Personal details
- Born: 11 June 1939 Rotterdam, Netherlands
- Died: 13 September 2023 (aged 84)
- Party: D66
- Education: Leiden University
- Occupation: Scientist

Olga Scheltema-de Nie (11 June 1939 – 13 September 2023) was a Dutch scientist and politician. A member of Democrats 66, she served in the House of Representatives from 1989 to 2002.

Scheltema-de Nie died on 13 September 2023, at the age of 84.
