= Theo Meijer (politician) =

Dutch politician (1947–2023)

Member of the House of Representatives of the Netherlands
- In office 8 October 1996 – 1 September 2003

Personal details
- Born: Theodorus Antonius Maria Meijer; 8 April 1947 Dieren, Netherlands
- Died: 13 August 2023 (aged 76) Uden, Netherlands
- Party: CDA

Theodorus Antonius Maria Meijer (8 April 1947 – 13 August 2023) was a Dutch politician. A member of the Christian Democratic Appeal, he served in the House of Representatives from 1996 to 2003.

Meijer died in Uden on 13 August 2023, at the age of 76.
