= List of candidates in the 1998 Dutch general election =

Prior to the 1998 Dutch general election, contesting parties put forward party lists.

== 1: Labour Party ==
Candidate list for Labour Party
Position	Candidate	Votes	Result
1	Wim Kok	2,198,395	Elected
2	Jacques Wallage	29,271	Elected
3	Karin Adelmund	70,941	Elected
4	Margreeth de Boer	18,405	Elected
5	Ad Melkert	8,908	Elected
6	Tineke Netelenbos-Koomen	7,805	Elected
7	Jan Pronk	39,958	Elected
8	Willem Vermeend	4,040	Elected
9	Margo Vliegenthart	3,465	Elected
10	Judith Belinfante	6,266	Elected
11	Rick van der Ploeg	6,646	Elected
12	Khadija Arib	4,438	Elected
13	Jan van Zijl	871	Elected
14	Marleen Barth	1,336	Elected
15	Anneke van Dok-van Weele	1,088	Elected
16	Rob Oudkerk	3,682	Elected
17	Ella Kalsbeek-Jasperse	1,814	Elected
18	Frans Timmermans	7,561	Elected
19	Marjet van Zuijlen	2,266	Elected
20	Ferd Crone	410	Elected
21	José Smits	719	Elected
22	Dick de Cloe	1,013	Elected
23	Desirée Duijkers	591	Elected
24	Mariëtte Hamer	648	Elected
25	Jeltje van Nieuwenhoven	1,470	Elected
26	Adri Duivesteijn	599	Elected
27	Laurette Spoelman	1,211	Elected
28	Wouter Gortzak	672	Elected
29	Lucy Kortram	1,585	Elected
30	Gerritjan van Oven	1,059	Elected
31	Rob van Gijzel	7,026	Elected
32	Saskia Noorman-den Uyl	5,071	Elected
33	Bert Middel	1,241	Elected
34	Sharon Dijksma	6,234	Elected
35	Bert Koenders	430	Elected
36	Marja Wagenaar	931	Elected
37	Peter Rehwinkel	1,306	Elected
38	Martin Zijlstra	1,356	Elected
39	Wouter Bos	1,281	Elected
40	Peter van Heemst	799	Elected
41	Nebahat Albayrak	7,454	Elected
42	Gerrit Valk	620	Elected
43	Jaap Jelle Feenstra	293	Elected
44	Willie Swildens-Rozendaal	542	Elected
45	Jet Bussemaker	407	Elected
46	Thanasis Apostolou	533	Replacement
47	Tineke Witteveen-Hevinga	891	Replacement
48	Annet van der Hoek	1,776	Replacement
49	Gerrit Schoenmakers	672	Replacement
50	Usman Santi	3,549	Replacement
51	Harm Evert Waalkens	1,917	Replacement
52	Arie Kuijper	1,853	Replacement
53	Willem Herrebrugh	248	Replacement
54	Rik Hindriks	202	Replacement
55	Jeroen Dijsselbloem	575	Replacement
56	Hillie Molenaar	3,696	Replacement
57	Staf Depla	415	Replacement
58	Eppo Bolhuis	492	Replacement
59	Jo Horn	290	Replacement
60	Jacques Monasch	179	
61	Annie de Veer	447	
62	Leo Balai	869	
63	Gerdi Verbeet	368	Replacement
64	Seyfi Özgüzel	10,360	
65	Tineke Lander-Riemersma	266	
66	Jack van Ham	231	
67	Lydia Giltaij-Lansink	271	
68	André Gerrits	142	
69	Jetta Klijnsma	177	
70	Arend Hilhorst	74	
71	Thea Fierens	309	
72	Jaap Dijkstra	285	
73	Michiel van Hulten	173	
74	Ton Huiskens	1,171	
Total			

== 2: Christian Democratic Appeal ==
Candidate list for Christian Democratic Appeal
Position	Candidate	Votes	Result
1	Jaap de Hoop Scheffer	1,213,412	Elected
2	Ank Bijleveld-Schouten	71,540	Elected
3	Siem Buijs	10,597	Elected
4	Gerda Verburg	13,363	Elected
5	Maria van der Hoeven	24,881	Elected
6	Hans van den Akker	3,390	Elected
7	Jan Peter Balkenende	2,471	Elected
8	Nancy Dankers	7,278	Elected
9	Jacques de Milliano	12,131	Elected
10	Cees van der Knaap	1,994	Elected
11	Wim van de Camp	2,401	Elected
12	Clémence Ross-van Dorp	3,358	Elected
13	Klaasje Eisses-Timmerman	3,820	Elected
14	Agnes van Ardenne-van der Hoeven	4,255	Elected
15	Hans Hillen	3,448	Elected
16	Gerd Leers	4,972	Elected
17	Henk de Haan	1,259	Elected
18	Maxime Verhagen	977	Elected
19	Pieter Jan Biesheuvel	1,575	Elected
20	Peter van Wijmen	1,467	Elected
21	Joop Atsma	11,009	Elected
22	Theo Rietkerk	3,445	Elected
23	Theo Stroeken	10,428	Elected
24	Joop Wijn	834	Elected
25	Marry Visser-van Doorn	783	Elected
26	Jacob Reitsma	1,651	Elected
27	Theo Meijer	16,392	Elected
28	Aart Mosterd	5,194	Replacement
29	Marleen de Pater-van der Meer	1,016	Replacement
30	Coskun Cörüz	9,086	Replacement
31	Jan ten Hoopen	13,501	Replacement
32	Gerrit de Jong	1,311	
33	Corien Jonker	2,819	Replacement
34	Gerrit Terpstra	2,940	
35	Cees Bremmer	832	
36	Camiel Eurlings	24,008	Elected
37	Ad Koppejan	732	
38	Annie Schreijer-Pierik	17,422	Elected
39	Bas Jan van Bochove	432	
40	Marianne van Hall-Disch	694	
41	Piet Jansen	2,750	
42	Manon Pelzer	4,045	
43	Greetje de Vries-Leggedoor	563	
44	Sjoerd Galema	10,395	
45	Marjon Gadella-van Gils	320	
46	Roland van Vugt	1,641	
47	Frans Potuyt	211	
48	Roy Ho Ten Soeng	3,305	
49	Loes Huynen	279	
50	Rajendrenath Ramnath	3,944	
51-68	Regional candidates		
Total			

=== Regional candidates ===
Regional candidates for Christian Democratic Appeal
Candidate	Votes	Result	Position per electoral district													
Candidate	Votes	Result	Groningen, Leeuwarden, Assen, Lelystad	Zwolle	Nijmegen, Arnhem, Utrecht	Amsterdam	Haarlem	Den Helder	Den Haag	Rotterdam	Dordrecht	Leiden	Middelburg	Tilburg	Den Bosch	Maastricht
Broer Adema	475				56											
Rendert Algra	128		67													
Nanda Ammerlaan-Oosterlaan	159									64		66				
Yvonne Baetens-Derks	599															59
Deniz Balak	211					53										
Carla Bastiaansen	250													59		
Anneke van Bebber-Zoontjens	65														66	
Frank van Beers	255														65	
Jannes Berends	41			67												
Wil van den Berg	52										61					
Paul van Berlo	11								59	59	59					
Marja van Bijsterveldt-Vliegenthart	174										66					
Jack Biskop	71													60		
Hanneke Bleijenbergh	84												65			
Joop de Boe	40												58			
Ada Boerma-van Doorne	76		60													
Carmen Boersma-Weiss	26								62							
Lucas Bolsius	750				53				51	51	51	51				
André Borgdorff	71										62					
Theo Bovens	571															53
Ary Braakman	220				68											
Paul Claeijs	54												64			
Lous Coppoolse	44												60			
Robert Croll	173				51											
Lilian Cuelenaere-Faes	86												57			
Adri Dek	39												62			
Margo Dierick-van de Ven	169						62									
Johanna van Dijk-Theunissen	464															56
Simone Dirven-van Aalst	129													58		
Annet Doesburg	120				58	59	59	59								
Jan Douma	116							68								
Jos Draijer	62											59				
Jan Driessen	533															55
Theo Duijvestijn	395										64					
Pieter den Dulk	14								61							
Eric Dörr	148													57		
Janny Eelkema-Brouwer	170		55													
Nel Eelman-van 't Veer	212							61								
Jan Eerbeek	12								63							
Wim van Erp	204														61	
Guliël Erven	425															57
Elma Eshuis-Roxs	392														56	
Hein Galesloot	100						55									
Koos Geene	278														67	
Stans Gehrels	110						53									
Lenny Geluk-Poortvliet	22												67			
Ineke Giezeman	108				63				52	52	52	52				
Aranka Goyert	20					66										
Riet Greweldinger-Beudeker	417															51
Hedy-Jane Guds	229				59	60	60	60								
Janine Haasbroek-Visser	35						65									
Rien Hage	161											67				
Ben Hakvoort	120							63								
Jan van Hal	99													61		
Patrick Halters	114													67		
Gerrit Hartholt	37			66												
Henk den Hartog	25												54			
Peter van Heeswijk	783														58	
Lia van Helvoirt-Stravens	592													54		
Dick van Hemmen	119		66													
Peter Heukels	143			65												
Henk Hijink	54							62								
Bert ten Holter	13													66		
Harro Hoogerwerf	253					52	56	56								
Han Hoogma	46															61
Harrie ter Horst	51						61									
Ad Houtepen	150															64
Ben Hudepohl	146			61												
Jos Huizinga	42											65				
Carine Hulscher-Slot	49									66	67					
Frank van der Hulst	27													65		
Dite Husselman-Oosterom	153			51	57											
Elske Hörchner	7					63										
Anja Immink	112		58		61											
Nico van Jaarsveld	351								56	56	56	56				
Joke Jacobs	10								67							
Arend Jansen	55			54												
John Jansen	18												66			
Sandra Janssen	102												55			
Frans Janssen	71				67											
Kees Jochems	411													63		
Froukje de Jonge	179		54		55											
Marleen Jonkers-Goedhart	211														53	
Adriaan Kaland	6								65	67						
Riek Karg	13					61										
Mona Keijzer	89							66								
Joke Keizer-Barbier	21												63			
Frank Kerckhaert	12								68							
Conny Kerkhof-Mos	448													51		
Harry Kerssies	173			52	64											
Riet Koggel-Alferink	152			62												
Toon de Koning	108														62	
Manita Koop	248								55	55	55	55				
Kaya Turan Koçak	421													55	55	
Bart Krol	175				52											
Gina Kroon-Sombroek	946							53								
Johan Kruiskamp	109			64												
Wim Kuiper	98															58
Roel Laning	179							55								
Richard Leussink	121			58												
Paul Lokkerbol	45					55										
Myra van Loon-Koomen	63												51			
Dirk Louter	92								57	57	57	57				
Aike Maarsingh	509		68													
Alice Makkinga	231			68												
Lionel Martijn	48									61						
Joop Meerhoff	22					56										
Jan Melis	1,656													52	52	
Koos Meulenberg-op 't Hof	55												53			
Hans Moerland	51													64		
Daniel Moolenburgh	46							65								
Bèr Moonen	4,735															67
Ayad Mossad	45		62													
Herma Nap-Borger	175			55												
Niny van Oerle-van der Horst	24						57									
Huib van Olden	76														64	
Johan Oldenbroek	62														60	
Harry Oosterman	118		51													
René Paas	129		64													
Harry Paauw	110			60												
Ben Pauwels	419												68			
Ad Petermeyer	153													62		
Leny Poppe-de Looff	73												61			
Toine van Poppel	72													53		
Martje Postma	38					64										
Martin Reesink	295			56												
IJzebrand Rijzebol	290		52		60											
Leen La Rivière	85								60	60	60					
Ria van Rossum-Gortzak	47									65	63					
Ada Anne van Ruller-Schakel	37					57										
Erwin Rutten	87														59	
Michel Santbergen	6								66							
Hub Savelsbergh	352															66
Koob Schelhaas	398		53													
Dirk Scheringa	234							52								
Thea Schiphorst	157			59												
Albert Schipper	278			57												
Pierre Schlicher	24						52									
Hermien Schoon-Joling	86		65													
Frits Schreurs	80														63	
Anje Schultinga-Huizinga	95		57													
Oswald Schwirtz	36				66	67	67	67								
Henk Sijbrand	60							58								
Betsie van der Sloot-van der Heijden	385														51	
Frans Spit	60					68										
Johan Strijk	19											61				
Rhea Stroes	63			63												
Sjaak van der Tak	181									68		68				
Ingrid Thelissen-Jansen	153														57	
André Tukker	52									63		64				
Gerard Vanhommerig	351															62
Annemiek van der Veen-van de Vliet	172				54	54	54	54								
Cees Veerman	14										68					
Govert Veldhuijzen	89										65					
Jos van de Ven	300															60
Martin Verbeek	140			53												
Harrie Verkampen	3,926														54	
Nico Verlaan	120				65											
Hans Vermeulen	19						64									
Jacqueline Vermunt-Schrauwen	421													56		
Mieke Vervoort	131															65
Joop Vink	68								58	58	58	58				
Jeroen Vis	18					58										
Hidde Visser	98		59													
Dick van Vliet	77									62		60				
Jan Voetberg	9					65										
Willy Vos	300													68	68	
Odette van Waes-Smet	80												59			
Jacques Walch	30						66									
Hajé Walch	80						68									
Sjuck van Walré De Bordes	6					62										
Harry van Waveren	48												52			
Nel op de Weegh	43							64								
Philo Weijenborg-Pot	8								64							
Baukelien van der Werff	137		63													
Carla Westerkamp-Exoo	97		61													
Jos Wienen	157								54	54	54	54				
Theo van Wieringen	114											62				
Ursula Wijnen-Kivit	695															54
Theo Wilken	60															63
Toon Willems	571															52
Ans Willemse-van der Ploeg	950					51	51	51								
Greetje Willemsma	129				62				53	53	53	53				
Annelien de Winter-Wijffels	282		56													
Lein Wisse	88												56			
Henk Woldring	22						63									
Anne-marie Worm-de Moel	91							57								
Elly Zandwijk-van Hage	147											63				
Jaap Zuurbier	23						58									

== 3: People's Party for Freedom and Democracy ==
Candidate list for People's Party for Freedom and Democracy
Position	Candidate	Votes	Result
1	Frits Bolkestein	1,572,784	Elected
2	Hans Dijkstal	93,155	Elected
3	Annemarie Jorritsma-Lebbink	121,733	Elected
4	Gerrit Zalm	103,427	Elected
5	Erica Terpstra	121,470	Elected
6	Benk Korthals	4,420	Elected
7	Jozias van Aartsen	4,652	Elected
8	Anke van Blerck-Woerdman	5,270	Elected
9	Frank de Grave	8,284	Elected
10	Johan Remkes	3,115	Elected
11	Joris Voorhoeve	5,472	Elected
12	Hans Hoogervorst	759	Elected
13	Michiel Patijn	973	Elected
14	Monique de Vries	3,316	Elected
15	Henk van Hoof	974	Elected
16	Hella Voûte-Droste	3,339	Elected
17	Frans Weisglas	2,859	Elected
18	Nellie Verbugt	6,561	Elected
19	Clemens Cornielje	1,343	Elected
20	Bibi de Vries	1,591	Elected
21	Jan Rijpstra	2,043	Elected
22	Marijke Essers	1,320	Elected
23	Henk Kamp	1,307	Elected
24	Jan te Veldhuis	1,052	Elected
25	Pieter Hofstra	538	Elected
26	Willibrord van Beek	1,113	Elected
27	Patricia Remak	932	Elected
28	Jan Geluk	2,390	Elected
29	Hans van Baalen	1,820	Elected
30	Jan Hendrik Klein Molekamp	1,138	Elected
31	Enric Hessing	4,788	Elected
32	Jan Dirk Blaauw	1,724	Elected
33	Theo van den Doel	724	Elected
34	Atzo Nicolaï	452	Elected
35	Jacques Niederer	1,968	Elected
36	Gert Jan Oplaat	3,712	Elected
37	Frans Weekers	9,398	Elected
38	Fadime Örgü	1,977	Elected
39	Wim Passtoors	354	Replacement
40	Otto Vos	966	Replacement
41	Ruud Luchtenveld	582	Replacement
42	Elisabeth Meijer	1,491	Replacement
43	Oussama Cherribi	542	Replacement
44	Janneke Snijder-Hazelhoff	995	Replacement
45	Geert Wilders	274	Replacement
46	Philippe Brood	608	Replacement
47	Thijs Udo	380	Replacement
48	Eric Balemans	330	Replacement
49	Stef Blok	225	Replacement
50	Ton de Swart	639	Replacement
51	Ernst van Splunter	870	Replacement
52	Annemieke de Beer-Vermeulen	868	
53	Joost Manusama	523	
54	Kamla van Beelen-Balak	335	
55	Annemarie Hey	865	
56	Onno Hoes	2,619	
57	Sjef de Pont	317	
58-62	Regional candidates		
Total			

=== Regional candidates ===
Regional candidates for People's Party for Freedom and Democracy
Candidate	Votes	Result	Position per electoral district			
Candidate	Votes	Result	Groningen, Leeuwarden, Assen, Zwolle, Lelystad	Nijmegen, Arnhem, Tilburg, 's-Hertogenbosch, Maastricht	Utrecht, Amsterdam, Haarlem, Den Helder	's-Gravenhage, Rotterdam, Dordrecht, Leiden, Middelburg
Caroline Angevaren	305			58		
Joop Boertjens	111		58			
Gijsbert Bulk	98		59			
Joke Geldorp-Pantekoek	209		60			
Jan Haazen	1,514			62		
Hanneke Heemskerk-Nusselder	637				62	
Niels Joosten	180			59		
Henk van der Kooi	119					61
Sandra Korthuis	401					58
Tineke Liebregs	177					60
Hans Pluckel	93				58	
Hans Puijk	116		61			
Jeroen Raasveld	165				59	
Jan de Reus	140					59
Koen Schuiling	375		62			
Maarten Velthoen	177			60		
Arno Visser	389					62
Rob van der Werf	364			61		
Jan van Zanen	160				60	
Piet Zoon	1,565				61	

== 4: Democrats 66 ==
Candidate list for Democrats 66
Position	Candidate	Votes	Result
1	Els Borst-Eilers	559,343	Elected
2	Thom de Graaf	104,298	Elected
3	Roger van Boxtel	5,189	Elected
4	Boris Dittrich	10,960	Elected
5	Hans van Mierlo	38,995	Elected
6	Gerrit Ybema	4,843	Elected
7	Pieter ter Veer	1,113	Elected
8	Bert Bakker	1,110	Elected
9	Arthie Schimmel	1,270	Elected
10	Olga Scheltema-de Nie	7,209	Elected
11	Ursie Lambrechts	2,601	Elected
12	Jan Hoekema	1,069	Elected
13	Francine Giskes	2,351	Elected
14	Francisca Ravestein	3,048	Elected
15	Nicky van 't Riet	1,697	Replacement
16	Marijke Augusteijn-Esser	1,632	Replacement
17	Stefanie van Vliet	957	Replacement
18	Jan van Walsem	383	Replacement
19	Joke Jorritsma-van Oosten	1,894	
20	Louwrens Hacquebord	650	
21	Ageeth Telleman	622	
22	Dennis Hesseling	574	
23	Hubert Fermina	1,585	
24	Bob van den Bos	5,202	
25	Guikje Rutten	571	
26	Hans Jeekel	338	
27	Paul Wessels	805	
28	Benito Fraenk	109	
29	Willem Bos	460	
30	Michiel Ruis	472	
31	Marijn de Koning	3,131	
32	Michel van Hulten	376	
33	Steven Pieters	385	
34	Luc Winants	2,171	
35	Els Berman	308	
36	Barryl Biekman	836	
37	Vinko Prizmić	186	
38	Michiel Verbeek	208	
39	Marc Jan Ahne	203	
40	Heleen Maneschijn	453	
41	Carien Stephan	180	
42-46	Regional candidates		
Total			

== 5: General Elderly Alliance–Union 55+ ==
Candidate list for General Elderly Alliance
Position	Candidate	Votes	Result
1	A.H. Scheltens	31,413	
2	A. van Maanen	1,580	
3	M.A.I. Roeffen	1,396	
4	T.C. Wernsen	393	
5	P.J.G.J. Veugen	2,890	
6	S.A. van der Schoot	396	
7	M.J. van den Acker	516	
8	P.J. Overhand	654	
9	L. Batenburg	593	
10	H.T. Nijland	339	
11	A. Smits	313	
12	A. van 't Geloof	123	
13	C. Raaphorst-de Groot	343	
14	J. Mulder	394	
15	J.P.M. Bos	90	
16	M.T. Aarts	104	
17	T. Kalverboer	148	
18	J. Meendering	69	
19	R. Elslander	82	
20	J. Hut	109	
21	L.J. van Doorn	106	
22	E. Peltzer	81	
23	A.C.L. Braat	73	
24	L. van Koert	41	
25-30	Regional candidates		
Total			

=== Regional candidates ===
Regional candidates for General Elderly Alliance
Candidate	Votes	Result	Position per electoral district																		
Candidate	Votes	Result	Groningen	Leeuwarden	Assen	Zwolle	Lelystad	Nijmegen	Arnhem	Utrecht	Amsterdam	Haarlem	Den Helder	Den Haag	Rotterdam	Dordrecht	Leiden	Middelburg	Tilburg	Den Bosch	Maastricht
E.W. van Aartsen	27																		27	27	
Y.G. de Boer-Bierman	16						27														
B. ter Borg	39							27	27												
E. Christiani	112		28		28				28		28	28	28	28			28		28		
G. Dekker	49						26														
C.J.L. Diederen	191																				27
P.J. Doornbos	63														27						
B.F.W. Eshuis	56					27															
P. Fokken	15												27								
J.H.C. Goeman	7				27									27			26				
J. Hazenhoek	64		26	25	25																
D. Hoeksema	37			26																	
A.M. van Hoorn	106																			26	
J.A.W. Inslegers	18									27											
A. Jagersma	20		27																		
E.K. Jansma	14			27																	
Jim Janssen van Raaij	657		29	28	29	28	28	28	29	28	29	29	29	29	28	28	29	28	29	28	
W. de Jonge	26				26																
W.G.B. Klein Gebbink	35					26															
C.M. van der Kolk	23									26											
J. Kollaard	57																	27			
R.A. Kraft	62															26					
Bertus Leerkes	460		30	29	30	29	29	29	30	29	30	30	30	30	29	29	30	29	30	29	30
J.E. van Leeuwen-Veldhuizen	131		25			25	25	25	25	25	25	25	25	25	25	25	25	25	25	25	25
J.C.C. Leunisse	64																		26		
R. van der Meer	46																	26			
S.L. de Pee	95															27					
L.P. Peper	27										27										
J.P. van Pommeren	55														26						
A. Roeberding	41																27				
C.T.J. de Ruijter	46											26									
M.E.C. Santoro-van Halm Braam	42													26							
A.A.H. Smits	41										26										
J.E. Spandaw	125												26								
J.M.H. Voncken	90																				28
B. de Vries	24											27									
J.H.G. Wagemans	531																				26
M.T.A. Werson	172																				29
M.W.J. Willems	64							26	26												

== 6: GroenLinks ==
Candidate list for GroenLinks
Position	Candidate	Votes	Result
1	Paul Rosenmöller	470,381	Elected
2	Marijke Vos	68,507	Elected
3	Femke Halsema	15,395	Elected
4	Mohamed Rabbae	11,140	Elected
5	Ineke van Gent	5,588	Elected
6	Hugo van der Steenhoven	1,509	Elected
7	Kees Vendrik	624	Elected
8	Corrie Hermann	2,182	Elected
9	Tara Oedayraj Singh Varma	13,491	Elected
10	Ab Harrewijn	1,330	Elected
11	Farah Karimi	2,908	Elected
12	Tom Pitstra	711	Replacement
13	Saskia Bolten	1,541	
14	Nevin Özütok	4,059	
15	Ahmet Daskapan	4,060	
16	Dirk van Uitert	332	
17	Jeannine Molier	859	
18	Jan Laurier	593	
19	Hans Feddema	748	
20	Henk Koetsier	265	
21	Janny Lagendijk	395	
22	Els Boers	569	
23	Niyazi Bahadin	908	
24	Annemiek Rijckenberg	575	
25-30	Regional candidates		
Total			

=== Regional candidates ===
Regional candidates for GroenLinks
Candidate	Votes	Result	Position per electoral district																		
Candidate	Votes	Result	Groningen	Leeuwarden	Assen	Zwolle	Lelystad	Nijmegen	Arnhem	Utrecht	Amsterdam	Haarlem	Den Helder	Den Haag	Rotterdam	Dordrecht	Leiden	Middelburg	Tilburg	Den Bosch	Maastricht
Mohammed Abu Leil	164														27						
Cees Anker	54							25													
Judo Bakker	56						28														
Siem van den Berg	104												25								
Klaas Blanksma	56				27																
Jack Bogers	104								29												
Gertrude Bomer-van der Mheen	97								27												
Jansje Bouman	434								25												
Theo Bouwman	163																			28	
Kees Bozelie	126												29								
Roelie Braaksma-Bruinsma	305			25																	
Henk Branderhorst	36									26											
Maya de Bruijn-Reefman	799																				28
Toon Capel	58												26								
Sjef Czyzewski	1,214		30	29	30	30	30	30	30	30	30	30	30	30	30	30	30	30	30	30	30
Willemien Dirks	108				25																
Cor Drost	82		29																		
Guus van Elsen	59																25				
Bernhard Ensink	62				29																
Jan Felix	52								28												
Nel Florusse	119																	25			
Peter Freij	792																				25
Ruud Grondel	80										28										
Ank de Groot-Slagter	133																26				
Helma Gubbels-Korver	1,017																				26
Roel van Gurp	311																		29		
Dogan Gök	84											27									
Andrew Harijgens	189																		28		
Fer Harleman	83				26																
Yasmina Haïfi	87													25							
Luuk Heijlman	82											28									
Marlies Hermans	195							26													
Hans van 't Hof	54															26					
Anneke Izeboud	224																	27			
Tejo Janssens	64																29				
Pieter de Jong	23													26							
Miep de Jong-de Groot	87									27											
Jan Juffermans	156																			26	
Yüksel Karakurt	41																27				
Kitty Kolen-Megens	172																		27		
Frans van Kollem	64																	28			
Appie Kootstra	103		25																		
René Kortooms	176								26												
Hiddo Kostwinder	31		27																		
Bea Kruse	509														26						
Theo Kuipers	17						27														
Bart de Leede	140															29					
Luppo Leeuwerik	88		28																		
Rita van Ling	61						29														
Theo Lucassen	227							29													
Frans Maas	185																		26		
Herman Meijer	383														29						
Mieke Mennema	145															27					
Leo Mesman	184											26									
Albert Moens	32									25											
Cécile Morselt-de Ruijter	227					28															
Jan Muijtjens	1,212																				29
Trijntje Munters-Veenendaal	111												28								
Henk Nijhof	212					25															
Jan Norp	58							28													
Bram van Ojik	21													29							
Evelien van Onck	343																			27	
Annemiek Onstenk	180										25										
Adri van Oosten	121																	26			
Leo Platvoet	112										26										
Suze Poen-van den Hoek	87			27																	
Henk Roor	73									28											
Niek Roozenburg	54													27							
Steven van Schuppen	13													28							
Wim van Seeters	36									29											
Annelies Slotman-Lansu	53																	29			
Gijsbert Smit	29							27													
Jaap van Splunter	164										27		27								
Fennie Stavast	127		26																		
Tof Thissen	929																				27
Els Tiemeijer-Broers	529																			25	
Ben van der Velde	105															28					
Jeanne van der Velden	123														28						
Willy Verbakel	138															25					
Willem Verf	127			28																	
Theo Verlaan	29						26														
Marijke Visschedijk	158					26															
Heleen Visser-van der Weele	39						25														
Ronald van Vlijmen	57					29															
Loek van Voorst	109					27															
Mohamed el Wakidi	184														25						
Maria Wiebosch-Steeman	102										29	29									
Nelleke van Wijk	186																			29	
Wilbert Willems	322																		25		
Ilona de Wit	115																28				
Sjors Wolf	91											25									
Auke Wouda	159			26																	
Tanya Zeeman	92				28																

== 7: Centre Democrats ==
Candidate list for Centre Democrats
Position	Candidate	Votes	Result
1	Hans Janmaat	43,262	
2	Willy Schuurman	2,293	
3	Wim Elsthout	1,127	
4	John Zillen	737	
5	Chiel Koning	432	
6	Gerard Rieff	408	
7	Ruud Enthoven	507	
8	Jan Gilles	123	
9	Frans Heeren	331	
10	Cor Rietveld	197	
11	Bert Pellegrom	180	
12	Jan Stoops	59	
13	Bas Rietveld	117	
14	Dries de Jong	282	
15	Ton Koolhof	121	
16	John van der Steen	202	
17	Niek Meijer	112	
18	Jolanda van den Broek	259	
19	Ad Bierhuizen	174	
20-29	Regional candidates		
Total			

=== Regional candidates ===
Regional candidates for Centre Democrats
Candidate	Votes	Result	Position per electoral district	
Candidate	Votes	Result	Other	Amsterdam
Dorus Blokpoel	55		22	21
Janny Bom-Jurgens	100		21	20
Eddie Derkink	38		23	22
Jan van Herwijnen	251		28	27
Hans Kweens	135		26	25
Nel van der Pol	122		24	23
Robert Schaap	111		27	26
Jos van Scheppingen	73		25	24
Hennie Selhorst	127		20	
Ruud Snijders	291		29	28

== 8: Reformatory Political Federation ==
Candidate list for Reformatory Political Federation
Position	Candidate	Votes	Result
1	Leen van Dijke	143,084	Elected
2	André Rouvoet	7,966	Elected
3	Dick Stellingwerf	2,530	Elected
4	Cees van Bruchem	799	
5	Roel Kuiper	765	
6	Flora Lagerwerf-Vergunst	3,339	
7	Greet Visser-van Lente	940	
8	Willem Nuis	593	
9	Gerdien Rots	695	
10	Marien Bikker	328	
11	Willem Ouweneel	4,714	
12	Jitze Warris	294	
13	Atie van Geest-Groothuis	439	
14	Peter van Dalen	130	
15	Paul Blokhuis	403	
16	Johan Frinsel	1,226	
17	Alie Hoek-van Kooten	2,256	
18	Alex Langius	149	
19	Wil Hendriks	228	
20	Henk Jochemsen	136	
21	Albert de Boer	182	
22	Meindert Leerling	613	
23	Egbert Schuurman	193	
24	Rein Ferwerda	275	
25	Cor Hameeteman	153	
26	Willem Baarsen	425	
27	Pieter Jong	420	
28	Reinier Mulder	188	
29	Dick Schutte	562	
30	Wim Flim	568	
Total			

== 9: Reformed Political Party ==
Candidate list for the Reformed Political Party
Number	Candidate	Votes	Result	Ref.
1	Bas van der Vlies	140,174	Elected	
2	Koos van den Berg	2,846	Elected	
3	Kees van der Staaij	2,250	Elected	
4	Eppie Klein	1,455		
5	Arie Noordergraaf	643		
6	Elbert Dijkgraaf	369		
7	Gerrit Holdijk	494		
8	A. Weggeman	192		
9	P.C. den Uil	300		
10	Hans Tanis	279		
11	W. Pieters	566		
12	George van Heukelom	387		
13	M. Bogerd	380		
14	A. Beens	611		
15	Roelof Bisschop	242		
16	Adri van Heteren	149		
17	C.S.L. Janse	52		
18	J.D. Heijkamp	144		
19	L. Bolier	71		
20	F.W. den Boef	69		
21	L.G.I. Barth	112		
22	W. Fieret	150		
23	A.P. de Jong	93		
24	Gert van den Berg	146		
25	Dirk-Jan Budding	336		
26	Bert Scholten	389		
27	J. Mulder	68		
28	Tj. de Jong	255		
29	W. Bron	108		
30	Peter Zevenbergen	253		

== 10: Reformed Political League ==
Candidate list for Reformed Political League
Position	Candidate	Votes	Result
1	Gert Schutte	99,005	Elected
2	Eimert van Middelkoop	3,046	Elected
3	Arie Slob	1,634	Replacement
4	Leo Bezemer	365	
5	Marjan Haak-Griffioen	1,697	
6	Andries Heidema	177	
7	Tjisse Stelpstra	147	
8	Theo Haasdijk	114	
9	Dorothea de Graaf	357	
10	Eise van der Sluis	208	
11	Janco Cnossen	100	
12	Martin van Haeften	99	
13	Hans Blokland	83	
14	Mieke Wilcke-van der Linden	228	
15	Joop Alssema	108	
16	Bert Groen	106	
17	Leen Hordijk	47	
18	Melis van de Groep	179	
19	Kars Veling	84	
20	Jan Lagendijk	80	
21	Aaike Kamsteeg	119	
22	Jurjen de Vries	55	
23	Bep van Dijk	76	
24	Sieb Geerds	50	
25	Rudi Slager	63	
26	Aad van Hoffen	48	
27	Remmelt de Boer	49	
28	Jan van Groos	81	
29	Jan Westert	59	
30	Annelies van der Kolk	260	
Total			

== 11: Socialist Party ==
Candidate list for Socialist Party
Position	Candidate	Votes	Result
1	Jan Marijnissen	251,311	Elected
2	Remi Poppe	7,369	Elected
3	Jan de Wit	6,394	Elected
4	Agnes Kant	9,628	Elected
5	Harry van Bommel	2,005	Elected
6	Marianne Langkamp	2,982	
7	Chris van Heumen	2,167	
8	Josette Hermans	1,092	
9	Mariet Berendsen	982	
10	Fenna Vergeer-Mudde	673	
11	Bob Ruers	867	
12	Diny de Veer-van den Meijdenberg	691	
13	Havva Çinar	756	
15	Mohammed Bidou	284	
16-30	Regional candidates		
Total			

=== Regional candidates ===
Regional candidates for Socialist Party
Candidate	Votes	Result	Position per electoral district					
Candidate	Votes	Result	Groningen, Leeuwarden, Assen, Zwolle	Lelystad, Utrecht, Amsterdam, Haarlem, Den Helder	Nijmegen, Arnhem	's-Gravenhage, Rotterdam, Dordrecht, Leiden	Middelburg, Tilburg, 's-Hertogenbosch	Maastricht
Roos Aerts	257						26	
Sjraar van Avesaath	129							25
Frans Baron	175		21					
Jeanny Berg-Lamers	396							20
Susan de Boer	269						23	
Fred Bommezijn	114		29					
Ronald Boorsma	299		18					
Harm Bos	100			19				
Willem Bouman	108				29			
Marga van Broekhoven	241						17	
Anja Buitenhuis	171				18			
Jan Burger	190				17			
Wout Doppenberg	32				19			
Hans Elzenga	111						20	
Paul Freriks	62				22			
Jacqueline Gabriël	839		20	23	25	24	29	16
Bernard Gerard	436						18	
Paul Geurts	322							23
Mienk Graatsma	112			26				
Grietje Groenhof-Roede	127		27					
Gijs Hanegraaf	183							27
Gerard Harmes	163					18		
Mariska ten Heuw	220		19					
Helga Hijmans	299		23	21	20	14		24
Hans van Hooft	471				14			
Jules Iding	479						30	
Paulus Jansen	60			25				
Riek Janssen	189							17
Paul Jonas	588					30		
Jeannette de Jong	99			16				
Peter de Jonge	383		28	27	23	20	16	28
Cees de Jongh	34				21			
Martin Kappers	35					23		
Ben Karman	37				26			
Ger Klaus	281						25	
Sjef Kleijnen	459							18
Leida Koenders	91				16			
Tiny Kox	1,427		30	30	30	27	14	30
Edith Kuitert	236					16		
Johan Kwisthout	131						22	
Shantih Lalta	234			28		28		
Paul Lempens	121							29
Willy Lourenssen	93		24					
Peter Lucassen	94				28			
Guido van de Luitgaarden	84							26
Erik Meijer	209					25		
Willem van Meurs	116						28	
Hilde van der Molen	89			20				
Agnes Molendijk	116					26		
Jean-Louis van Os	111						24	
Brenda Overbeek-van Keulen	110			24				
Willem Pepers	167		17					
Lucie Pufkus	158					22		
Theo Rijks	113				24			
Wil Roeden	97							21
Emile Roemer	247						27	
Piet de Ruiter	162					17		
Johannes Saarloos	151		26					
Marian Schepers	210						19	
Frits Schoenmaker	83			22				
Nico Schouten	98			29				
Henny Sneevliet-de Wit	289					21		
Bea Spekman	35				27			
Gijs Stavinga	172		25					
Hermien Steekers-van den Burg	46					19		
Elianne Sweelssen	110		16					
Peter Verschuren	449		14					
Gerda Verwoort	350			14				
Hennie de Vroome-de Haas	120							19
Mieke van de Weijer-van den Berg	223							22
Johan de Weijs	200		22					
Jeannette van Westerloo-van de Noort	99			18				
Fred Wezenaar	68					29		
Tanja van Woensel	91			17				
Ger Wouters	410						21	
Peter van Zutphen	622							14

== 12: Seniors 2000 ==
Candidate list for Seniors 2000
Position	Candidate	Votes	Result
1	Jet Nijpels-Hezemans	29,129	
2	Ron Meyer	1,383	
3	Eef van den Berg	632	
4	Thea Banning-Melchers	426	
5	Geert Bos	319	
6	Jan van Wijk	375	
7	Ton van Zandbergen	204	
8	Francy van Gelder	220	
9	Peter Cuijpers	182	
10	Han Tan	172	
11	Bert Panday	129	
12	Bert Gilissen	681	
13	Tineke van der Wal-Vriezen	129	
14	Cok van Heesch	118	
15	Ferdinand Alink	88	
16	Bart van der Blij	87	
17	Romy Holtus-de Haan	280	
18	Gerard Bus	86	
19	Aly Boersma	89	
20	Jan Boerland	237	
21	Jo Ravesteijn-Siebbeles	121	
22	Jan van der Werf	93	
23	Ton Marree	50	
24	Leo Serto	51	
25	Jaap Kruizinga	76	
26	Coen Hendriks	53	
27	Joke t Hart-van den Brink	84	
28	Ellen van der Ploeg	100	
29	Leo Boogaard	116	
30	Dees Nijpels	447	
Total			

== 13: Natural Law Party ==
Candidate list for Natural Law Party
Position	Candidate	Votes	Result
1	Jacques Uijen	8,841	
2	Roelie van Opijnen	1,485	
3	Jan Storms	358	
4	Peronne Boddaert	400	
5	Sonja Visser-Fonteyne	337	
6	Joop Dijkstra	169	
7	Wieteke Moody-van Dort	1,939	
8	Harry Geuting	132	
9	Lindeke Mast	137	
10	Wytze de Lange	79	
11	Jeanne Hupperetz-Barrois	189	
12	Theo Tromp	128	
13	Jan te Voortwis	127	
14	Jacob van Vliet	190	
15	Jeanine van Nieukerken-de Wilde	71	
16	Gerard van Hall	57	
17	Edith Stegeman	99	
18	Anna van Kakerken-van Tilborg	112	
19	Robbert Oosterom	97	
20	Anton Blok	58	
21	Jeanine Dudart	169	
22	Harrie Hutschemakers	117	
23	Hans Commandeur	55	
24	Caroline Bongers	144	
25	Micha Claessen	88	
26	Gerard Rieter	168	
Total			

== 14: New Communist Party–NCPN ==
Candidate list for New Communist Party–NCPN
Position	Candidate	Votes	Result
1	Engel Modderman	4,059	
2	Arie van Kooten	212	
3	Rinze Visser	227	
4	Job Pruijser	131	
5	Wil van der Klift	84	
6	Hein van Kasbergen	46	
7	Joop Gozeling	28	
8	Corry Westgeest	87	
9	Rik Min	34	
10	Jan Cleton	35	
11	Hans Heres	40	
12	Bert Bakkenes	28	
13	Carla Bakhuys	42	
14	Dirk van Swinderen	46	
15	Herwin Sap	22	
16	Jaap Quakernaat	47	
17	Jasper Schaaf	39	
18	John van Veen	18	
19	Mans Pruis	19	
20	Peter Heemeijer	13	
21	Sara Lich-Bruins	41	
22	Ton Paardekooper	33	
23	Willem Gomes	24	
24	Chris Steijvers	25	
25	Elly Mulders	33	
26	Alejandro de Mello	48	
27	Geert Siemons	23	
28	Wolter van der Veen	28	
29	Marco Verhagen	27	
30	Jamal Ftieh	81	
Total			

== 15: The Greens ==
Candidate list for The Greens
Position	Candidate	Votes	Result
1	Jaap Dirkmaat	9,122	
2	Kirsten Kuipers	1,863	
3	Martin van Meurs	246	
4	Annemarie ter Veer	507	
5	Roel van Duijn	1,382	
6	Rob Visser	169	
7	Peter Pot	154	
8	Leo Jacobs	120	
9	Marian Hulscher-Emeis	160	
10	Peter Heukels	59	
11	Yvonne Olf	208	
12	Otto ter Haar	45	
13	Jan van der Meer	93	
14	Bart Kuiper	75	
15	Michiel van Harten	116	
16	Helene Stafleu	69	
17	Hans Visscher	65	
18	Ben Kal	66	
19	Jeanette de Jong	81	
20	Carla Seelemeijer	53	
21	Jos Kamphuys	49	
22	Bessie Schadee	36	
23	Igor Cornelissen	56	
24	Anneke Smit-Boerma	62	
25	Karel Eijkman	39	
26	Herman Verbeek	167	
27	Hans Righart	28	
28	Hans Dorrestijn	259	
29	Henk Westbroek	569	
30	Jos Brink	667	
Total			

== 16: Free Indian Party ==
Candidate list for Free Indian Party
Position	Candidate	Votes	Result
1	R.O. Koop	3,519	
2	I.J. de Frétes	1,314	
3	P. Koeze	169	
4	R.C. Kuipers	234	
5	E.L. van Toll	82	
6	C.E. Meijer-Blaauw	216	
7	R.H. Doop-Kopetzky	103	
8	W.B. de la Rambelje	284	
9	M.N.M. Schardijn	243	
10	H.G. Bergman	140	
11	W.R. Roelofsen	138	
12	F. Esmeijer	43	
13	E.R. Frans	61	
14	A.E.H. Agerbeek	125	
15	E.R. Blaauw	554	
Total			

== 17: Idealists/Jij ==
Candidate list for Idealists/Jij
Position	Candidate	Votes	Result
1	Jan Verschure	1,220	
2	Abraham de Kruijf	105	
3	Aliek van den Berg	200	
4	Frans Prins	57	
5	Juliënne Holthuis	84	
6	Jan Kuiper	51	
7	Remco Polman	26	
8	Wolter van Hasselt	41	
9	Pauline Versteegh	42	
10	Mieke van Dijk	32	
11	Gerard Schut	61	
12	Floor Visser	44	
13	Henk Kooij	15	
14-29	Regional candidates		
Total			

=== Regional candidates ===
Regional candidates for Idealists/Jij
Candidate	Votes	Result	Position per electoral district			
Candidate	Votes	Result	Groningen	Leeuwarden	Nijmegen	Middelburg
Ellard Jon Bijpost	19		22	23	23	22
Gabriëlle van Duren	52		15	16	16	15
Gerrit Huizer	48			28	29	27
Rudi Klumpkens	34		16	17	17	16
Marinus Knoope	88		26	27	28	26
Daniëlle Nienkemper	1				27	
Ronaldo Nobel	37		20	21	21	20
Lida Oosterboer	16		21	22	22	21
Stefan Papp	23		18	19	19	18
Pim van Prooijen	33		19	20	20	19
Femke Ratering	34		25	26	26	25
Ellen Stekelenburg	26		24	25	25	24
Romana Theisen	23		17	18	18	17
Femke Tieland	28		23	24	24	23
Eser Tözüm	29			14	14	
Elbert Westerbeek	31		14	15	15	14

== 18: New Middle Party ==
Candidate list for New Middle Party
Position	Candidate	Votes	Result
1	Martin Dessing	14,572	
2	Wouter van der Sluis	599	
3	Martien van der Valk	2,209	
4	Brüni Heinke	1,162	
5	Hans Bontkes	168	
6	Henk Hendrix	433	
7	Cas de Valk	288	
8	Arno Haije	98	
9	Nelleke Hegman	244	
10	Ynte Hofstede	69	
11	Wien van den Brink	2,622	
12	Ed Baak	79	
13	Ab van der Burgh	119	
14	Bert Gijrath	40	
15	Jan Schut	96	
16-21	Regional candidates		
Total			

=== Regional candidates ===
Regional candidates for New Middle Party
Candidate	Votes	Result	Position per electoral district		
Candidate	Votes	Result	Groningen	Other	Amsterdam
Henny Eliveld	133		19	21	20
Henk de Fluiter	146		18	20	19
Charles Heerze	132			16	16
Ben van Loef	187		16	18	18
Jan van Schaagen	77			17	17
Ger Schlooz	39		17	19	

== 19: Mobile Netherlands ==
Candidate list for Mobile Netherlands
Position	Candidate	Votes	Result
1	Ton Linssen	35,830	
2	Johan van Laar	1,465	
3	Herman Souer	495	
4	Chris Faddegon	258	
5	Wim Smid	452	
6	Michiel Postema	702	
7	Sonja van Steenoven	912	
8	Lex de Coninck	159	
9	Hans de Beer	544	
10	Jan Holsteijn	301	
11	Harry Sloot	166	
12	Jerry van Rijthoven	166	
13-30	Regional candidates		
Total			

=== Regional candidates ===
Regional candidates for Mobile Netherlands
Candidate	Votes	Result	Position per electoral district	
Candidate	Votes	Result	1	2
Vincent van Ardenne	89		24	25
René Barel	81		16	17
Hans van Beek	104		23	24
Ary Bleijie	58		25	26
Simon Peter Bollen	389		26	27
Harry van Dusseldorp	90		17	18
Jan Endtz	52		18	19
Rudi Hermans	419		13	14
Claudia van 't Hof	250		20	21
Ton van 't Hof	218		15	16
Anja van der Hoff	1,008		28	30
Frans Joseph Hoppenbrouwers	55			13
Arnold Kortekaas	470		21	22
Wim van de Krol	59		22	23
Ellen Lathouwers	154		19	20
Jac Marsman	138		27	28
Karel Mucek	53		14	15
Henk Teunissen	82			29

== 20: Catholic Political Party ==
Candidate list for Catholic Political Party
Position	Candidate	Votes	Result
1	Olaf van Boetzelaer	6,699	
2	P.A.P. Houdijk	294	
3	A.F.J. Schrijer	167	
4	E.D. van der Vliet-Zakrzewska	155	
5	Th.J. van de Molengraft	110	
6	J.A. van Meeteren	81	
7	P.C. Maximus	80	
8	H.J. Kocken	76	
9	J.R.F. Peters	81	
10	P.C.J.G. Somerwil	32	
11	J.W.H. Scheeren	219	
12	J.M.E. van Gils	239	
Total			

== 21: The Voters Collective ==
Candidate list for The Voters Collective
Position	Candidate	Votes	Result
1	Hein Steinen	709	
2	Donate den Hertog	92	
3	Jaap van de Scheur	183	
4	Liesbeth van Kriekingen	80	
5	Patrick Meijer	52	
6	Dimphi van Loon	51	
7	Peter Beccari	29	
8	Stanley Goeloe	74	
9	Rob Brockhus	64	
10	Wolter van Overbeeke	28	
11	Han Caron	38	
12	Matthijs Esser	199	
13-15	Regional candidates		
Total			

=== Regional candidates ===
Regional candidates for The Voters Collective
Candidate	Votes	Result	Position per electoral district	
Candidate	Votes	Result	1	2
Henk de Bode	10			15
Dirk Schouten	50		13	13
Rinus Vis	9			14

== 22: New Solidarity Elderly Union ==
Candidate list for New Solidarity Elderly Union
Position	Candidate	Votes	Result
1	Martin Batenburg	4,512	
2	Raghoenath Kanhai	632	
3	Albert Maris	104	
4	Mieke Batenburg-de Hoog	179	
5	Hans van Dalen	127	
6	Riet van Meer-van Roij	127	
7	Jan Wiekens sr.	65	
8	Jan van Adrichem	55	
9	André Filius	33	
10	Ron de Raat	39	
11	Rob Verlinden	132	
12	Hans Batenburg	450	
Total			

== Source ==
- Kiesraad (19 May 1998). "Proces-verbaal zitting Kiesraad uitslag Tweede Kamerverkiezing 1998" (PDF) (in Dutch).
