= Nijpels =

Nijpels or Nypels is a Dutch surname. Notable people with the surname include:

- Ed Nijpels (born 1950), Dutch politician and non-profit director
- GertJan Nijpels (1951–2021), Dutch vorstand and politician
- Jet Nijpels (born 1947), Dutch politician
- Erwin Nypels (born 1933), Dutch politician
