= Theo Hendriks =

Dutch politician (1928–2015)

Member of the House of Representatives
- In office 17 May 1994 – 19 May 1998

Member of the States of North Brabant
- In office 1973 – 5 June 1974

Personal details
- Born: 18 July 1928 Zutphen, Netherlands
- Died: 1 July 2015 (aged 86) Goirle, Netherlands
- Party: Catholic People's Party (1973–1974), General Elderly Alliance (until October 1994), Independent (since October 1994)

Theodorus Josephus Maria "Theo" Hendriks (18 July 1928 – 1 July 2015) was a Dutch politician, he served as member of the House of Representatives between 1994 and 1998. Although elected for the General Elderly Alliance he was soon expelled from the party. Hendriks retained his seat and continued as an independent.

== Career ==
Hendriks was born on 18 July 1928 in Zutphen. He followed his MULO education until 1944. Hendriks worked for Philips in Eindhoven from 1961 to 1965. Between 1965 and 1971 he was employed in the Eindhoven office of urban designer Sam van Embden. Hendriks was the chief urban design engineer of the municipality of Tilburg between 1971 and 1993.

Between 1973 and 5 June 1974 Hendriks was member of the States of North Brabant for the Catholic People's Party. In the 1994 parliamentary elections he gained a seat in the House of Representatives for the General Elderly Alliance. Only a couple of months after the elections Hendriks fell out with party leader Jet Nijpels, this led to him being expelled from the party on 10 October 1994. Hendriks continued as an independent. During this time Hendriks was noted for his comments on asylum seekers. He was also characterized by his unconventional approach to House politics and at one time in December 1994 he fell out with House of Representatives President, Wim Deetman. In 1997 Hendriks asked the Dutch government questions on the Bilderberg conferences, being the first MP ever to do so. He demanded a report of the conference of that year. Hendriks left the House of Representatives on 19 May 1998.

Hendriks died on 1 July 2015 in Goirle.
