= Atzo Nicolaï =

Dutch politician (1960–2020)

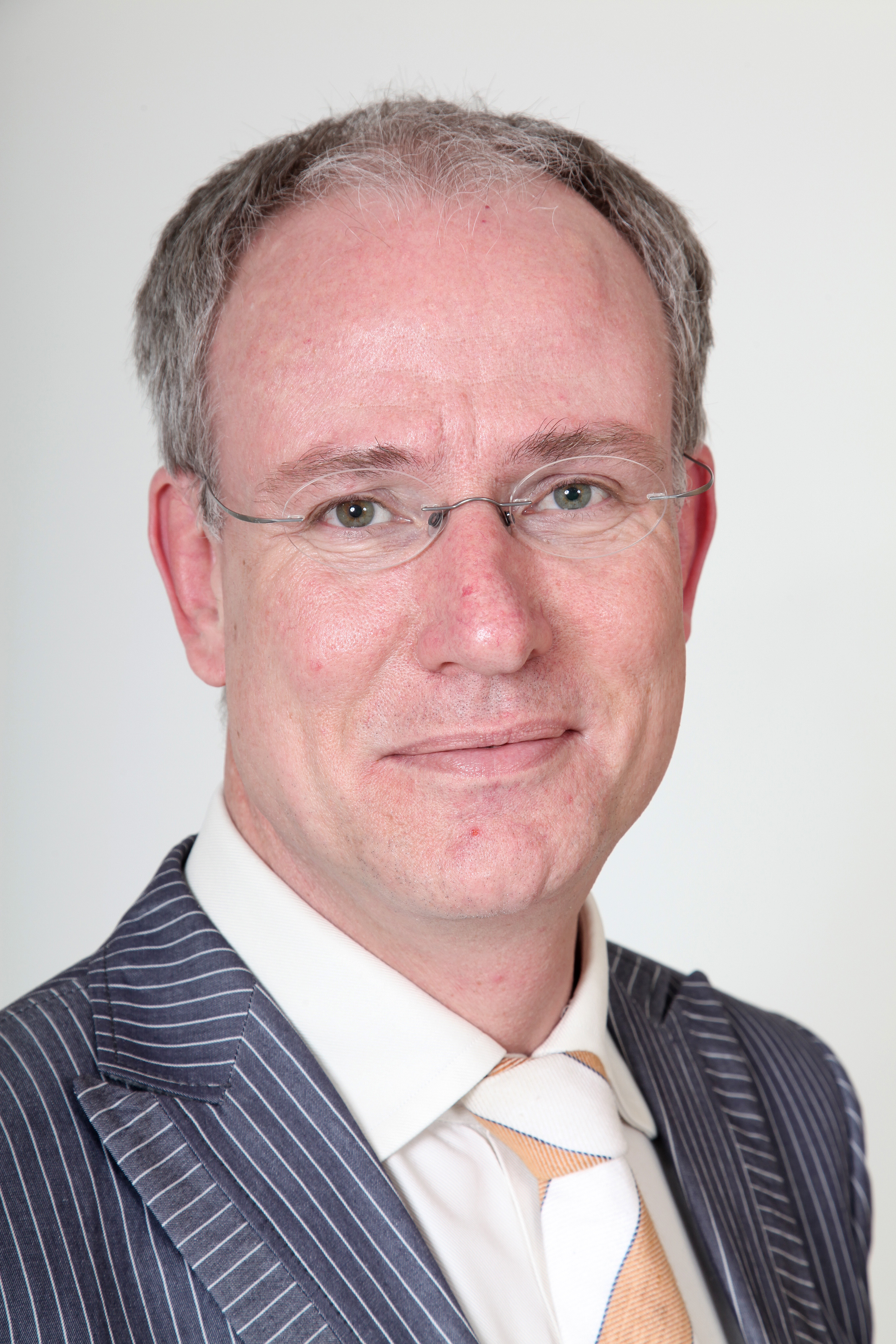
- Nicolaï in 2010

Member of the Social and Economic Council
- In office 1 July 2011 – 1 October 2019
- Chairman: See list: Alexander Rinnooy Kan (2011–2012) Wiebe Draijer (2012–2014) Mariëtte Hamer (2014–2019)

Minister for Governmental Reform and Kingdom Relations
- In office 7 July 2006 – 22 February 2007
- Prime Minister: Jan Peter Balkenende
- Preceded by: Alexander Pechtold
- Succeeded by: Office discontinued

State Secretary for Foreign Affairs
- In office 22 July 2002 – 7 July 2006 Serving with Agnes van Ardenne (2002–2003)
- Prime Minister: Jan Peter Balkenende
- Preceded by: Dick Benschop
- Succeeded by: Frans Timmermans (2007)

Member of the House of Representatives
- In office 30 November 2006 – 1 June 2011
- In office 30 January 2003 – 27 May 2003
- In office 19 May 1998 – 22 July 2002
- Parliamentary group: People's Party for Freedom and Democracy

Personal details
- Born: 22 February 1960 Delft, Netherlands
- Died: 21 August 2020 (aged 60) Amstelveen, Netherlands
- Party: People's Party for Freedom and Democracy (from 1993)
- Spouses: Marian Verburgh (m. 1993; div. 2008) Hilde Laffeber (m. 2015)
- Children: 3 (first marriage)
- Education: Free University Amsterdam (Bachelor of Social Science, Bachelor of Laws, Master of Social Science, Master of Laws)
- Occupation: Politician · Civil servant · Jurist · Businessman · Corporate director · Nonprofit director · Trade association executive · Academic administrator · Theatrical producer · Editor · Author

Atzo Nicolaï (22 February 1960 – 19 August 2020) was a Dutch politician of the People's Party for Freedom and Democracy (VVD) and businessman.

== Education and early career ==
Nicolaï attended a Montessori Gymnasium Rotterdam from April 1972 until May 1980 and applied at the Free University Amsterdam in June 1980 majoring in Law and Political science and obtaining a Bachelor of Laws degree and a Bachelor of Social Science degree in Political science in June 1982 before graduating with a Master of Laws degree and a Master of Social Science degree in Political science in July 1987. Nicolaï worked as a civil servant for the department of Arts and Culture of the Ministry of Welfare, Health and Culture from August 1987 until December 1990, and as Director-General of the Council for Arts from December 1990 until November 1995 and as Director-General of the Council for Culture from November 1995 until May 1998. Nicolaï worked as a management consultant for the Ministry of Education, Culture and Science from March 1997 until May 1998.

== Political career ==
Nicolaï was elected as a House of Representatives member after the election of 1998, taking office on 19 May 1998 serving as a frontbencher and the spokesperson for Justice, Law enforcement, Media, Culture and deputy spokesperson for Social Affairs and Social Work. After the election of 2002 Nicolaï was appointed as State Secretary for Foreign Affairs in the Cabinet Balkenende I, taking office on 22 July 2002. The Cabinet Balkenende I fell just four months later on 16 October 2002 after tensions in the coalition over the stability of the Pim Fortuyn List (LPF) and continued to serve in a demissionary capacity. After the election of 2003 Nicolaï returned as a Member of the House of Representatives, taking office on 30 January 2003. Following the cabinet formation of 2003 Nicolaï continued as State Secretary for Foreign Affairs in the Cabinet Balkenende II, taking office on 27 May 2003. The Cabinet Balkenende II fell on 30 June 2006 after the Democrats 66 (D66) had lost confidence in the functioning of Minister of Integration and Asylum Affairs Rita Verdonk and continued to serve in a demissionary capacity until the cabinet formation of 2006 when it was replaced by the caretaker Cabinet Balkenende III with Nicolaï appointed as Minister for Governmental Reform and Kingdom Relations, taking office on 7 July 2006. After the election of 2006 Nicolaï again returned as a Member of the House of Representatives, taking office on 30 November 2006. The Cabinet Balkenende III was replaced by the Cabinet Balkenende IV following the cabinet formation of 2007 on 22 February 2007 and he continued to serve in the House of Representatives as a frontbencher and spokesperson for Foreign Affairs, Social Affairs, European Affairs, NATO, Benelux Union, Aviation and deputy spokesperson for Kingdom Relations and Social Work. After the election of 2010 Nicolaï was appointed Minister of Foreign Affairs in the Cabinet Rutte I but during the cabinet formation of 2010 his appointment was blocked by the coalition partner Party for Freedom (PVV) and he continued to serve in the House of Representatives chairing the parliamentary committee for Foreign Affairs.

In May 2011, Nicolaï was named as Chairman of the board of directors of the DSM Company, and he resigned as a Member of the House of Representatives the same day he was installed as chairman on 1 June 2011. Nicolaï also became active in the public sector and occupied numerous seats as a nonprofit director on several boards of directors and supervisory boards (National History Museum, Bird Protection Foundation). Nicolaï also worked as a trade association executive for the Chemical Industry association serving as Vice Chairman of the Executive Board from 1 June 2011 until 1 October 2019 and for the Industry and Employers confederation (VNO-NCW).

== Personal life and death ==
Atzo Nicolaï married in 1993 and in 2015. The second marriage was consummated by Frits Bolkestein. Nicolaï was the father of three children.

Nicolaï died of cancer at age 60 after a short illness.

== Decorations ==
Honours
Ribbon bar	Honour	Country	Date
	Officer of the Order of Orange-Nassau	Netherlands	11 April 2007

Political offices
Preceded by Dick Benschop	State Secretary for Foreign Affairs; 2002–2006; Served alongside: Agnes van Ardenne (2002–2003)	Succeeded by Frans Timmermans; 2007
Preceded by Alexander Pechtold	Minister for Government Reform and Kingdom Relations; 2006–2007	Succeeded by Office discontinued
Business positions
Preceded by Jos Schneider	Chairman of the Board of directors of the DSM Company; 2011–2019	Succeeded by Edith Schippers
Academic offices
Preceded by Jet Bussemaker	Chairman of the Supervisory board of the University of Amsterdam; 2012–2016	Succeeded by Unknown
Preceded by Jet Bussemaker	Rector Magnificus of the Amsterdam University of Applied Sciences; 2012–2016	Succeeded by Unknown
Non-profit organization positions
Preceded by Office established	Chairman of the Supervisory board of the National History Museum; 2008–2010	Unknown
Unknown	Chairman of the Supervisory board of the Bird Protection Foundation; 2011–2017	Succeeded by Henk Scheffers
