= Meindert Leerling =

Dutch politician, television director, and journalist (1936–2021)

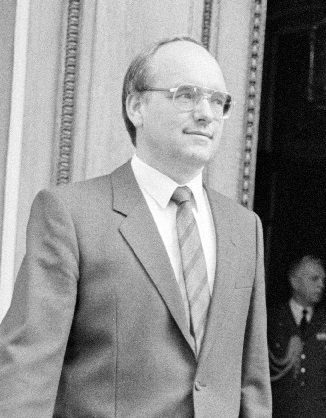
- Meindert Leerling in 1982

Leader of the Reformatory Political Federation
- In office 10 June 1981 – 17 May 1994
- Preceded by: Jan Rietkerk
- Succeeded by: Leen van Dijke

Parliamentary leader in the House of Representatives
- In office 10 June 1981 – 17 May 1994
- Preceded by: Office established
- Succeeded by: Leen van Dijke
- Parliamentary group: Reformatory Political Federation

Member of the House of Representatives
- In office 10 June 1981 – 17 May 1994
- Parliamentary group: Reformatory Political Federation

Personal details
- Born: Meindert Leerling; 11 January 1936 Heerjansdam, Netherlands
- Died: 9 May 2021 (aged 85) Bergambacht, Netherlands
- Party: ChristianUnion (2002–2021)
- Other political affiliations: Reformatory Political Federation (1977–2002); Anti-Revolutionary Party (1955–1962)
- Children: 3 children
- Occupation: Politician · Journalist · Editor · Author · Television director · television producer · Nonprofit director

Meindert Leerling (11 January 1936 – 9 May 2021) was a Dutch journalist and politician of the defunct Reformatory Political Federation (RPF), nowadays merged in the ChristianUnion (CU).

== Life and career ==
As a member of the Reformatory Political Federation (Reformatorische Politieke Federatie) he was a member of the Dutch House of Representatives as well as a parliamentary leader from 1981 to 1994. Previously he worked as a television director and RTV journalist for the Evangelical Broadcasting (Evangelische Omroep) and as a sports journalist for several newspapers. Meindert Leerling was married twice (his first wife died in 1999) and was a member of the Reformed Association in the Protestant Church in the Netherlands (a subdivision of the Protestant Church in the Netherlands (PKN)).

== Decorations ==
Honours
Ribbon bar	Honour	Country	Date	Comment
	Knight of the Order of the Netherlands Lion	Netherlands	17 May 1994	

Party political offices
Preceded by Jan Rietkerk; 1977	Lijsttrekker of the Reformatory Political Federation; 1981 • 1982 • 1986 • 1989	Succeeded by Leen van Dijke; 1994
Party political offices
Preceded by Jan Rietkerk	Leader of the Reformatory; Political Federation; 1981–1994	Succeeded by Leen van Dijke
Preceded by Office established	Parliamentary leader of the Reformatory Political Federation in the House of Representatives; 1981–1994	Succeeded by Leen van Dijke
