= Aad Wagenaar =

Dutch politician (born 1940)

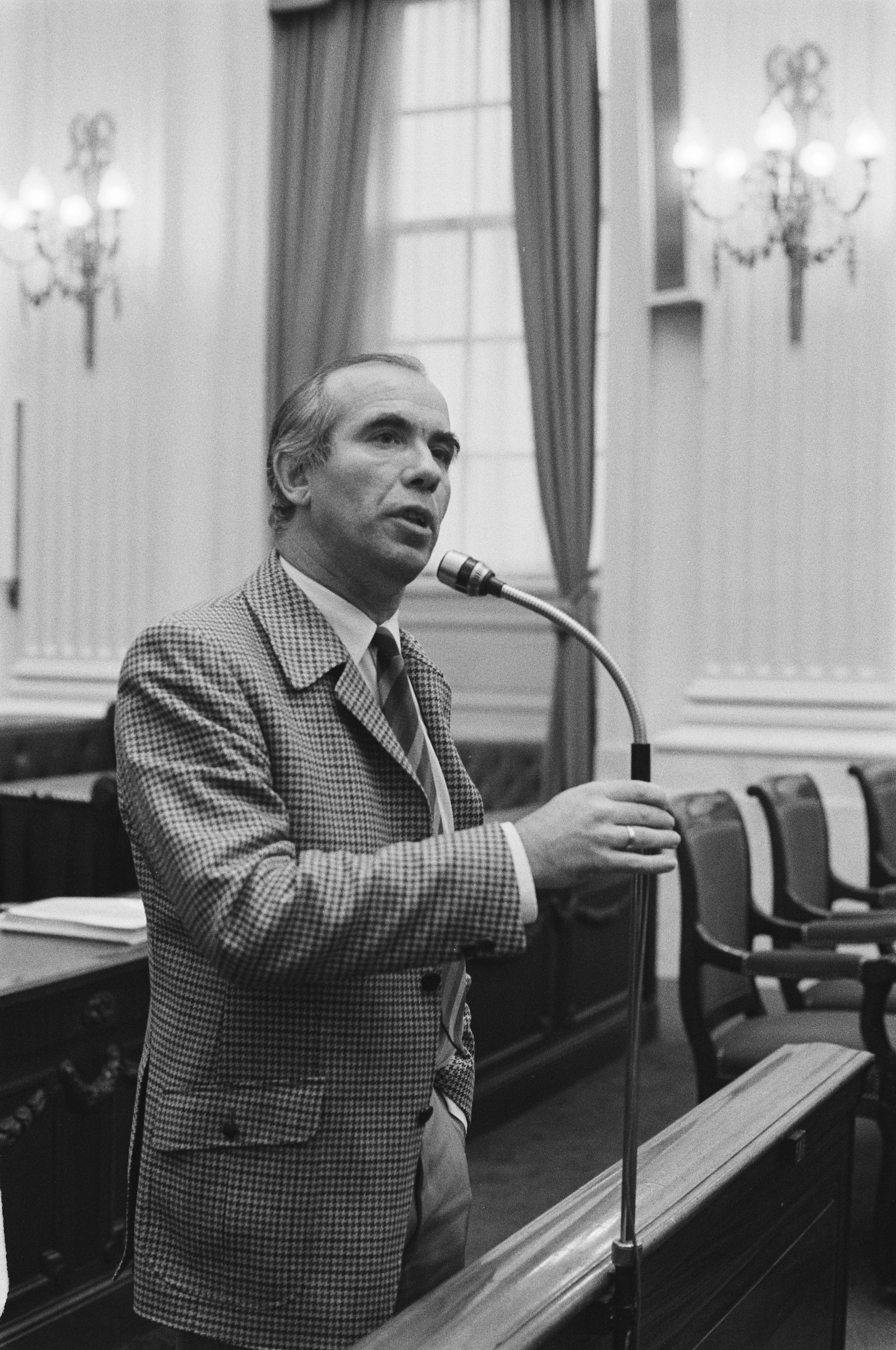
Aad Wagenaar

Arie Huibrecht Dignus "Aad" Wagenaar (born 4 December 1940, Gouda) is a former Dutch politician for the Reformatory Political Federation (RPF) and the Groep Wagenaar which he founded on 20 April 1985, and Anti-Revolutionairen 1985 (AR-85).

He became a teacher of religion and civics and was a spokesman for defense and foreign policy. He was understanding towards the South African apartheid regime and was strongly opposed by the Dutch peace movement. He unsuccessfully participated in the Lower House elections of 1986. In 1987 he became a member of the CDA.

Wagenaar is a practicing member of the Reformed Churches in the Netherlands.
