= 2006 Dutch cabinet formation =

Cabinet formation in the Netherlands

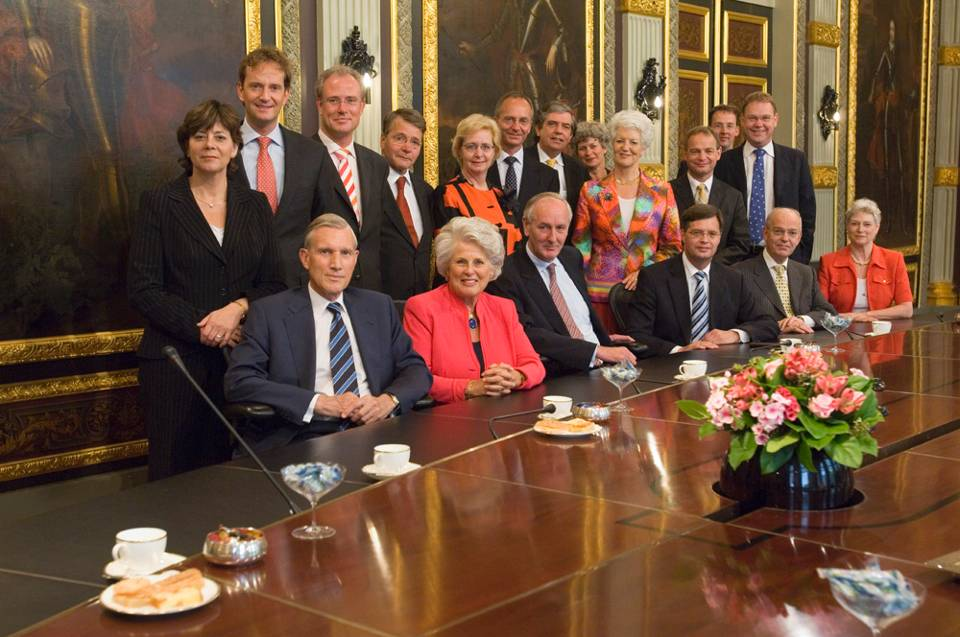
Because the cabinet consisted of virtually the same ministers as the previous cabinet, there was no traditional bordes scene. Instead, this photo opportunity was offered at the start of the first Council of Ministers on 7 July.

After the fall of the second Balkenende cabinet on 30 June 2006, a cabinet formation took place in Netherlands. On 7 July, this resulted in the third Balkenende cabinet. The minority cabinet was formed by Christian Democratic Appeal (CDA) and People's Party for Freedom and Democracy (VVD). It was a rump cabinet of the third Balkenende cabinet, but without ministers from Democrats 66 (D66).

== Background ==
The direct cause of the cabinet crisis was the actions of VVD Minister for Immigration and Integration Rita Verdonk with regard to the Dutch nationality of Member of House of Parliament Ayaan Hirsi Ali (VVD). In that debate on 29 June 2006, D66 ultimately supported a motion of no confidence against Verdonk, which nevertheless did not achieve a majority. However, D66 was unsatisfied with the cabinet for some time, where they were the smallest partner with six seats. For example, they were against the military mission in the Afghan province of Uruzgan.

Despite D66's support for the motion of no confidence, VVD and CDA continued to support Verdonk. The Council of Ministers after the debate also unanimously took the position that this had no consequences for the cabinet, including the ministers of D66. According to D66 MP Bert Bakker, D66 minister Laurens Jan Brinkhorst wanted to continue governing. D66 minister Alexander Pechtold had just previously been elected as party leader, and wanted to use his ministership as a platform.

After the Council of Ministers, Prime Minister Jan Peter Balkenende made a short statement in the House, in which he reiterated that it had no consequences. The D66 parliamentary leader in the House Lousewies van der Laan then indicated that her parliamentary group had lost confidence in the cabinet and said that the Prime Minister should offer the cabinets resignation to the Queen. Because no motion of no confidence had been submitted and adopted, there was uncertainty as to whether the cabinet had fallen. In an emergency meeting of the Council of Ministers during the suspension of the debate, the ministers concluded that they had to offer their resignation and would be a demissionary cabinet. The D66 ministers were expected to leave the cabinet immediately, to their unpleasant surprise. On 30 June, Balkenende presented this conclusion to the Queen.

Disappointed that the cabinet had fallen, CDA and VVD announced that they wanted to continue as a non-demissionary minority cabinet. An important reason for this was that they wanted to present a fully-fledged budget in 2007 with a tax reduction of more than one billion euros, after years of austerity rounds. They also wanted to discuss the submitted law Working on profit, with a tax reduction for companies of another one billion.

== Informateur Lubbers ==
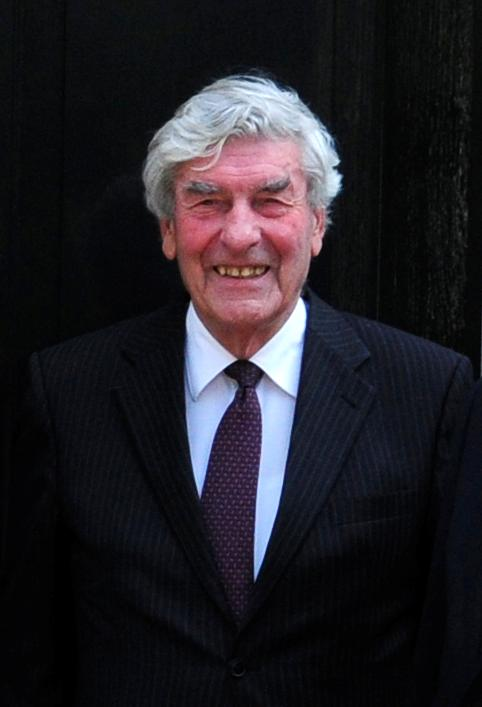
Informateur Ruud Lubbers, 2011

Queen Beatrix received her advisors and the parliamentary leaders after her dismissal. VVD and CDA argued for the formation of a 'rump cabinet with a missionary status'. The Pim Fortuyn List (LPF), Christian Union, Reformed Political Party (SGP) and the Nawijn Group supported this proposal, together with CDA and VVD a parliamentary majority. Labour Party (PvdA), D66, GroenLinks and the independents Geert Wilders and Ali Lazrak rejected this, although PvdA and Socialist Party (SP) soon indicated that they did not oppose this either. Former CDA Prime Minister and Minister of State Ruud Lubbers was asked by the Queen on 1 July to serve as informateur to 'form a missionary cabinet of CDA and VVD'. The cabinet's task was to organise elections on 'a date to be determined in November 2006'.

For confidence and supply, the focus was mainly on ChristenUnie/SGP (five seats), D66 (six seats) and the LPF (which went from seven to six seats during the formation). Despite the loss of confidence, Van der Laan indicated that she supported the tax plan and the budget, as they had previously been in favor of this in the cabinet. Furthermore, it was a lot about the 'list problem': which laws and measures could still be implemented with confidence and supply.

Lubbers reported on 5 July. The election date of 22 November that year received broad support. There was also sufficient support for the budget and the tax plan, because D66 would provide support. He emphasized that there was no special role for the LPF. Lubbers did not discuss the list issue in detail, but advised the cabinet to exercise restraint. Finally, he recommended that Balkenende be made formateur. Remarkably, after the report, Van der Laan announced that he would still support a possible motion of no confidence against the cabinet, because Verdonk was still in it.

== Formateur Balkenende ==
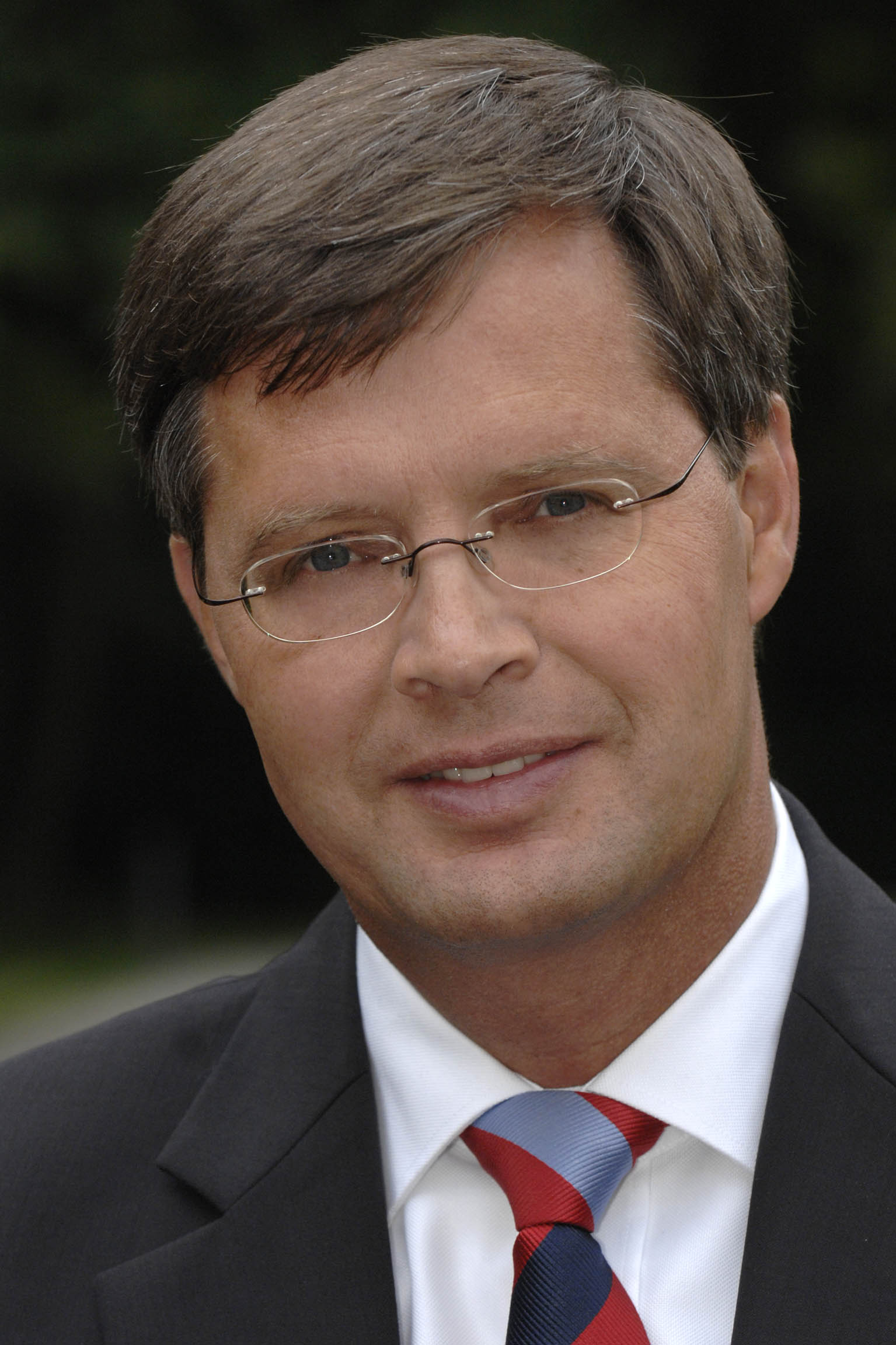
Formateur Jan Peter Balkenende, 2006

On 5 July, the Queen appointed Balkenende as formateur with the task of forming a cabinet from CDA and VVD. He spoke with party leaders Mark Rutte (VVD) and Maxime Verhagen (CDA) about the composition of the cabinet. The outgoing ministers would all join the new cabinet. The ministerial positions that were vacant due to the resignation of the D66 ministers were filled. State Secretary for Finance Joop Wijn became Minister of Economic Affairs. State Secretary for European Affairs Atzo Nicolaï became Minister for Administrative Innovation and Kingdom Relations. Bruno Bruins also joined the cabinet as State Secretary for Education, but he had already been appointed before the fall of the cabinet. They were sworn in on 7 July after the constitutive deliberation (Dutch: Constituerend beraad) on 6 July.
