= Reformatory Political Federation =

Former political party in the Netherlands

Reformatory Political Federation Reformatorische Politieke Federatie
- Founded: 15 March 1975
- Dissolved: 31 December 2003
- Merged into: Christian Union
- Youth wing: RPF-jongeren
- Membership (2000): 12,474
- Ideology: Christian democracy
- Political position: Centre-right
- Religion: Orthodox Protestant (Note: Orthodox Protestantism is a term which is used in the Netherlands to refer to conservative forms of Protestantism in contrast to liberal or free-thinking forms of Protestantism. This includes conservative branches of the Dutch Reformed Church and the Reformed Churches of the Netherlands (now united in the Protestant Church of the Netherlands), but also to independent forms of Reformed Protestantism, such as the Reformed Churches (Liberated) or other more conservative forms of Protestantism such as the certain branches of Baptism)
- European affiliation: EDD
- Colors: Light blue Dark blue

The Reformatory Political Federation (Dutch: Reformatorische Politieke Federatie; RPF) was a minor Protestant Christian democratic political party in the Netherlands. Throughout the period between 1981 and 2002, the RPF would have one to three members of parliament, never taking part in a government coalition as a testimonial party. In 2003, the party merged into the Christian Union.

== History ==
Logo the party used from 1978 to 1992

=== Formation ===
The RPF was founded on 15 March 1975 by three groups of orthodox Protestants. The first group were former members of the Anti-Revolutionary Party, who were concerned about the perceived dominance of left-wingers within the ARP and had formed several internal dissident groups, including the Anti-Revolutionary Youth Contact ("Antirevolutionair Jeugdcontact"), renamed to the Reformatory Political Youth Contact ("Reformatorisch Politiek Jeugdcontact") in 1974, as well as the Conversation Group of AR-supportera ("Gespreksgroep van AR-gezinden").

The second the National Evangelical Union ("Nationaal Evanglisch Verbond", NEV, a small party which had earlier left the ARP, and had sought membership in the Reformed Political League (GPV), but had been denied because they were not members of the Reformed Church (Liberated). In 1972, the NEV broke with the GPV, and began making overtures to the ARJC and Conversation Group. In October 1974, together with several independent electoral committees from Gelderland and Overijssel, these groups would gather and resolve to found a "temporary" political movement, which was officially established in March 1975.

The founders opposed the formation of the Christian Democratic Appeal, because the Protestant ARP and Christian Historical Union would join with the Catholic People's Party. However, attempts at attracting dissatisfied orthodox Protestant voters were unsuccessful, and in the subsequent 1977 general election, the RPF was unable to win any seats.

The RPF sought to unite all other orthodox Protestant Christian parties, namely the Reformed Political League (GPV) and the Reformed Political Party (SGP), with which it competed electorally. Early attempts at cooperation were generally unsuccessful, in the 1978 Dutch provincial elections the party only managed to form an electoral alliance in Friesland with the SGP, and once again failed to win a single seat. In the 1979 European Parliament election the three orthodox Protestant parties ran separately as well, each failing to win a seat despite obtaining enough votes to gain a seat had they ran on a united electoral list.

=== 1980s and early 1990s ===
In 1981, Meindert Leerling took over as party leader. The RPF won two seats in the 1981 Dutch general election (Meindert Leerling and Aad Wagenaar). Leerling sought to modernise the party's image and replace its conservative Calvinist image with a more dynamic one, which he put into practice by more forcefully advancing the gospel in his parliamentary contributions. It also won seats in the Senate for the first time in 1983.

In 1985, Aad Wagenaar, one of its two members of parliament, seceded from the party following four years of intense internal political conflict that had begun in 1981 following accusations from Wagenaar that the party had abandoned its Reformed roots by letting in increasing amounts of Evangelical voters. He would form the Anti-Revolutionaries 1985, but failed to obtain a seat in the 1986 Dutch general election. The RPF lost its second seat in that election, which was attributed to internal turmoil and the popularity of the CDA attracting many orthodox Protestant voters. In the following years, the party would continue its process of seeking cooperation with the other orthodox Protestant parties, running on a shared electoral list with the SGP and RPF for the European Parliament from the 1984 European Parliament election on, as well as on the local level. It also sought to strengthen its ties to fellow Evangelical Christian organisations in the Netherlands.

=== Electoral revival, 1994-1998 ===
Following years of electoral stagnation, Leerling resigned the party leadership in 1992, and was replaced a year later by Leen van Dijke. Under Van Dijke, the party underwent a significant ideological shift, presenting itself as a more social alternative to the CDA and increasing its focus on economic and environmental issues. This led to a revival in the RPF's electoral fortunes, gaining 2 seats for a total of 3 seats in the 1994 Dutch general election.

In 1996, RPF party leader Leen van Dijke came under public criticism when the magazine Nieuwe Revu had suggested that in an interview he had declared: "Why would stealing, for example committing social welfare fraud, be less of a sin than going against the seventh commandment? Yes, why should someone in a homosexual relationship be better than a thief?" When turmoil broke out, Van Dijke explained that he had meant to convey a universally accepted vision within Christianity that violating one of God's commandments makes a man guilty before God, and that all breaches herein are equal. But the general public, and especially the Dutch gay movement, heavily criticised the statement as printed in Nieuwe Revu, considering it discrimination. As such, the magazine Gay Krant reported it to the Attorney General. In 1999 the Dutch high court ruled that Van Dijke's views were not discriminatory according to Dutch law. In 2001 he was cleared by the Supreme Court of the Netherlands.

From 1998, the RPF and GPV began to work closely together in parliament, pushed forward by the RPF's disappointing performance in the 1998 Dutch general election where it narrowly failed to gain a fourth seat in the House of Representatives. In 2000, the Christian Union, into which both parties would unite was officially founded. In 2002, it first ran in the general election and won five seats.

== Linked organisations ==
The party magazine was called RPF signal and the scientific foundation the Marnix van St. Aldegonde Stichting.The Evangelische Omroep broadcasting association had strong personal and ideological links with the RPF, but was never officially linked to the party.

== Ideology ==
The RPF believed that society should be based on Biblical norms and values. The political differences between the GPV and SGP, the two other orthodox Protestant parties, were marginal and based on theological differences, the GPV being closely associated with the Reformed Churches in the Netherlands (Liberated) and the SGP having ties to various Pietist Reformed denominations, such as the Reformed Congregations and the Old-Reformed Congregations in the Netherlands. The RPF in contrast was much more ecumenical, encompassing not only various orthodox Reformed groups but also Evangelicals and Pentecostals.

In its early years, during the late 1970s and 1980s, the party was strongly conservative in its political orientation, combining traditional Christian moral views on issues such as abortion, homosexuality and pornography with strong opposition to government intervention in the economy and the welfare state.

Under Leen van Dijke, the RPF underwent a radical ideological shift in the early 1990s. Economically, the party abandoned its opposition to the welfare state in favour of a more active government role in solving social problems and protecting the vulnerable as well as the environment. The RPF started labeling itself "Christian-Social" in 1996 and the 1998 electoral manifesto spoke of the need for a "guided economy" where markets would be allowed to operate as long as they did not have negative social consequences. On social issues the party remained strongly Christian-conservative, opposing homosexuality and speaking out against the teaching of the theory of evolution in schools.

== Election results ==
=== House of Representatives ===
Election	Lead candidate	List	Votes		Seats	Ref.
Election	Lead candidate	List	No.	%	Seats	Ref.
1977	Jan Rietkerk	List	53,220	0.64	0 / 150	
1981	Meindert Leerling	List	108,364	1.25	2 / 150	
1982	Meindert Leerling	List	124,235	1.51	2 / 150	
1986	Meindert Leerling	List	83,582	0.91	1 / 150	
1989	Meindert Leerling	List	85,231	0.96	1 / 150	
1994	Leen van Dijke	List	158,705	1.77	3 / 150	
1998	Leen van Dijke	List	174,593	2.03	3 / 150	

=== Senate ===
Election	Lead candidate	List	Votes		Seats	Ref.
Election	Lead candidate	List	No.	%	Seats	Ref.
1983		List			1 / 75	
1986		List			1 / 75	
1987		List			1 / 75	
1991		List			1 / 75	
1995		List			1 / 75	

== Electorate ==
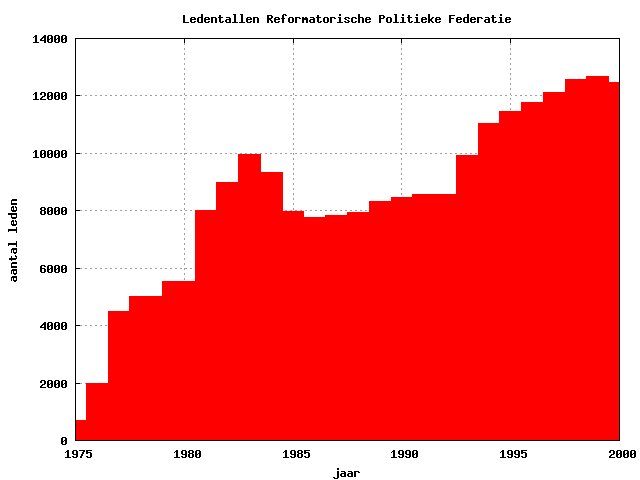
The number of the RPF membership throughout years

The RPF was supported by non-Liberated orthodox Reformed of many denominations, such as the Reformed Churches and the Dutch Reformed Church. Members of newer Protestant churches (such as the Evangelical Church and the Pentecostal community) also supported the party from the 1980s on. The electorate was concentrated in Zeeland, the Veluwe, parts of Overijssel, forming what is known as the Bible Belt.

== Party leaders ==
- Meindert Leerling: 1980 - 1993
- Leen van Dijke: 1994 - 2001

== International comparison ==
Internationally, the party was comparable to the American Christian right and the small Protestant parties of Scandinavia, such as the Norwegian Christian Democratic Party, the Swedish and Danish Christian Democrats. On the European level, the RPF, along with the SGP and GPV, was a part of the eurosceptic Europe of Democracies and Diversities political group.
