= Union 55+ =

Union 55+ (in Dutch: Unie 55+) was a Dutch pensioners' political party. The Union was somewhat successful in the 1994 elections but disappeared four years later.

== Party History ==
Union 55+ was founded on 24 September 1992. During the 1994 election campaign, one of the governing parties, CDA announced that it would cut government pensions. This made Union 55+ very attractive to the elderly. The party won one seat. The General Elderly Alliance (Algemeen Ouderen Verbond, AOV), another party seeking to represent the elderly won six seats. The two parties had formed an electoral alliance. The party's sole representative was Bertus Leerkes. While the six members of the AOV spent their time fighting with each other, Leerkes became a well-respected spokesperson for the elderly. The party continually sought to cooperate with the AOV. In 1995 they formed communal lists for the 1995 provincial elections. Before the 1998 general elections, Union 55+ formed a new party with the AOV, the Elderly Union (Ouderenunie). They were unable to win a seat.

== Ideology & Issues ==
The party was a typical one issue party: it sought to better the position of the elderly with higher government pensions, better healthcare and improved facilities for elderly and handicapped. Other issues it spoke out on were increasing youth criminality, directly elected mayors and a restrictive immigration policy.

Some of the party's founders had been active within other parties such as the social-democratic PvdA and the socialist SP, but they felt that the larger parties neglected the interests of the elderly. They thought that it was time for the formation of 'horizontal' parties, which were not based on certain ideologies, but certain age groups.

== Representation ==
This table shows Union 55+'s results in elections to the House of Representatives and Senate, as well as the party's political leadership: the fractievoorzitter, is the chair of the parliamentary party and the lijsttrekker is the party's top candidate in the general election, these posts are normally taken by the party's leader.

Year	HoR	S	Lijsttrekker	Fractievoorzitter
1994	1	0	Bertus Leerkes	Bertus Leerkes
1995	1	0	no elections	Bertus Leerkes
1996	1	0	no elections	Bertus Leerkes
1997	1	0	no elections	Bertus Leerkes

== Electorate ==
The party was supported by elderly, especially by former CDA-voters from the Southern provinces, North Brabant and Limburg.

== International Comparison ==
The party can be compared to other small elderly parties, who often don't get a seat, but because of the extreme proportional representation in the Netherlands the party was able to win one seat.

== See also ==
- 50PLUS, Dutch pensioners' interests party founded in 2009
- Bertus Leerkes, leader of Union 55+ from 1994 to 1998
