= Jet Nijpels =

Dutch former politician

Member of the House of Representatives
- In office 17 May 1994 – 19 May 1998

Personal details
- Born: Henriette Maria Hezemans; 10 September 1947 (age 79) Bergen op Zoom, Netherlands
- Party: VVD (1974-1993); AOV (1994-1995); Senioren 2000 (1995-1999)
- Children: 2

Henriette Maria "Jet" Nijpels-Hezemans (born 10 September 1947) is a Dutch former politician. From 1994 to 1998, she was a member of the Dutch House of Representatives, initially as leader of the General Elderly Alliance (AOV), and after being expelled from the AOV following internal party conflicts as an independent.

== Early life ==
Jet Nijpels was born on 10 September 1947 in Bergen op Zoom. Her husband was a wealthy pharmacist, for whom Jet Nijpels worked as an accountant until 1986. In 1986, Jet Nijpels was elected to the Eindhoven municipal council as a member of the VVD, where she became known as an independent-minded politician, such as in 1988 when she led an initiative to remove a VVD alderman.

In 1993, Nijpels left the VVD in Eindhoven due to her support for municipal clerk Wouters, who had been publicly criticised by all party leaders in the council due to low performance and consolidation of power. The local VVD had subsequently refused to list her on the party list for next year's local elections, and after considering legal action Nijpels then decided to leave the party, accusing them of conspiring against her.

== General Elderly Alliance ==
In 1993, Martin Batenburg had founded the General Elderly Alliance (AOV), after the Third Lubbers cabinet had proposed cuts to pensions. Batenburg had initially decided to hire Nijpels as a political advisor for the AOV, while remaining party chairman himself. However, for the 1994 Dutch general election, he decided not to run for election due to his advanced age, instead choosing the 46-year-old Nijpels, who had previously denied having any aspirations for entering national politics, to head the AOV's party list. Following that year's election, where the AOV won 6 seats in the House of Representatives, Nijpels became the AOV's parliamentary leader.

Under Nijpels's leadership, the AOV parliamentary group was marked by internal conflict. Immediately after being elected, AOV MP Will Verkerk announced his intentions to disregard party discipline, after which Nijpels failed to convince him to give up his seat. Another MP, Theo Hendriks, was ejected by Nijpels from the parliamentary group on 11 October 1994 for refusing to recognise party leadership, whereupon Hendriks accused Nijpels of using "communist methods" as leader and became an independent. That same year AOV MP Cees van Wingerden accused Nijpels of failure as leader and nepotism, which led to Nijpels hosting a press conference where she publicly criticised Van Wingerden's career history.

In 1995, Martin Batenburg had intended to join the Senate for the AOV, but was placed on the eighth spot on the party list due to his age, although he was nevertheless able to enter the Senate due to preferential votes. In response, the AOV fractured into a faction around Batenburg, joined by Verkerk and Van Wingerden, who accused Nijpels of ageism and committing a coup, and a faction around Nijpels. In May 1995 Nijpels had Verkerk and Van Wingerden suspended, who hit back by accusing one of Nijpels's staffers of having been a member of the far-left Red Youth.

Subsequently, the AOV general assembly voted to expel Nijpels from the AOV, which led to Nijpels and two of her allies resigning from the AOV on 28 August 1995, continuing under the name Group Nijpels. That same year, she founded the Seniors 2000 party. In 1997, Nijpels sued her former party colleague Cees van Wingerden over his accusations that she had stolen 60,000 guilders from the AOV. In the 1998 Dutch general election, Nijpels ran as leader of Seniors 2000, but failed to secure a seat, and as a consequence she left the House of Representatives that year.

Looking back on her political career, Nijpels would criticise her fellow party members, seeing them as too independent-minded, people who had never quite managed to reach the top but saw their positions as MPs as their moment to shine. She has also attributed the conflicts in the AOV under her leadership to her colleagues’ inability to accept having a younger woman as their boss.

== Personal life ==
Nijpels is married and has 2 children. She is the sister-in-law of former minister and VVD leader Ed Nijpels.
