= Gerda Verburg =

Dutch politician and diplomat

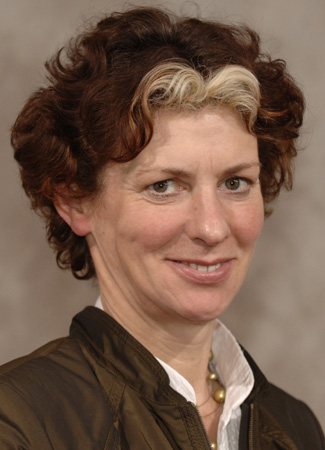
- Verburg in 2007

Permanent Representative of the Netherlands to the FAO, IFAD and WFP
- In office 1 July 2011 – 1 December 2015
- Preceded by: Agnes van Ardenne
- Succeeded by: Hans Hoogeveen

Minister of Agriculture, Nature and Food Quality
- In office 22 February 2007 – 14 October 2010
- Prime Minister: Jan Peter Balkenende
- Preceded by: Cees Veerman
- Succeeded by: Maxime Verhagen as Minister of Economic Affairs, Agriculture and Innovation

Member of the House of Representatives
- In office 17 June 2010 – 30 June 2011
- In office 19 May 1998 – 22 February 2007
- Parliamentary group: Christian Democratic Appeal

Personal details
- Born: Gerritje Verburg; 19 August 1957 (age 69) Zwammerdam, Netherlands
- Party: Christian Democratic Appeal (from 1993)
- Spouse: Willy Westerlaken (m. 2012)
- Occupation: Politician; diplomat; trade unionist

Gerritje "Gerda" Verburg (born 19 August 1957) is a Dutch politician, diplomat of the Christian Democratic Appeal (CDA) party and trade union leader.

From 2011 until 2016, Verburg served as Permanent Representative of the Kingdom of the Netherlands to the United Nations organizations for Food and Agriculture in Rome (FAO, IFAD and WFP) succeeding former CDA politician Agnes van Ardenne. As a member of the Christian Democratic Appeal (Christen-Democratisch Appèl), she was an MP from 1998 to 2007 and again from 2010 to 2011. She also served as Minister of Agriculture in the fourth Balkenende cabinet from 2007 to 2010. As an MP, she focused on matters of social affairs, the European Union and energy and innovation policy.

== Early life and education ==
Born in a family of farmers, Verburg attended mavo and havo at Protestant schools in Bodegraven and Alphen aan den Rijn. After completing her secondary education, she studied personnel work and labour relations at IJsselpoort Protestant School of Social Work in Kampen from 1976 to 1980.

== Career ==
=== Early career ===
Verburg began to work for Christian Rural Youth as general-secretary. In 1982 she began to work for the National Federation of Christian Trade Unions in the Netherlands. Between 1982 and 1986 as youth worker of the construction trade union and between 1986 and 1990 as chair of the CNV youth labour union. Between 1990 and 1997 she was on the union's board and she represented the union in the Social Economic Council and the European Trade Union Confederation (ETUC).

Between 1997 and 1998 Verburg worked as a businesswoman in communication and projects. She has also been a member of the Social and Economic Council and the Labour Foundation. She has served on the executive committee of the European Trade Union Confederation, and on the boards of the Interchurch Organisation for Development Cooperation, the Royal Dutch Equestrian Sports Federation (KNHS) and Stichting Geuzenverzet.

=== Political career ===
In Dutch general election of 1998, Verburg was elected as a Member of the House of Representatives for the Christian Democratic Appeal. She was one of the few Christian Democratic Appeal members who voted in favour of the legalisation of same-sex marriages.

In 2003 Verburg was candidate for President for the House of Representatives, but she was defeated by People's Party for Freedom and Democracy candidate Frans Weisglas. Verburg was from 2003 Vice-Chair of the Parliamentary Party in House of Representatives. She was the chair of the Christian Democratic Appeal commission on social affairs.

From 22 February 2007 until 14 October 2010 Verburg was Minister of Agriculture, Nature and Food Quality in the Cabinet Balkenende IV, and the first openly lesbian Minister of Christian Democratic signature in a Dutch Cabinet. On 17 June 2010 she returned to the House of Representatives until 30 June 2011.

=== Roles in the United Nations ===
From 1 July 2011, Verburg served as the Permanent Representative of the Kingdom of the Netherlands to the United Nations organizations for Food and Agriculture in Rome (FAO, IFAD and WFP) succeeding former CDA politician Agnes van Ardenne. In this capacity, she chaired the United Nations Committee on World Food Security (CFS) between 2013 and 2015.

In 2014, Verburg was appointed Chair of the Global Agenda Council for Food and Nutrition Security of the World Economic Forum (WEF).

In March 2016, Verburg was appointed by United Nations Secretary-General Ban Ki-moon as Coordinator of the Scaling Up Nutrition (SUN) Movement, an office she held until 2022. Later that year, Ban also appointed her to serve as member of the Lead Group of the Scaling Up Nutrition Movement.

In 2020, Verburg was appointed by United Nations Secretary-General António Guterres to serve on the Advisory Committee for the 2021 Food Systems Summit, chaired by Inger Andersen.

== Personal life ==
Verburg is openly lesbian and lives with her partner Willy Westerlaken in Woerden, whom she married in 2012.

== Decorations ==
Honours
| Ribbon bar | Honour | Country | Date | Comment |
|---|---|---|---|---|
| | Officer of the Order of Orange-Nassau | Netherlands | 3 December 2010 | |

Political offices
| Preceded by Cees Veerman | Minister of Agriculture, Nature and Food Quality; 2007–2010 | Succeeded by Maxime Verhagen as Minister of Economic Affairs, Agriculture and Innovation |
Diplomatic posts
| Preceded by Agnes van Ardenne | Permanent Representative of the Netherlands to the FAO, IFAD and WFP; 2011–2015 | Succeeded by Hans Hoogeveen |
