= General Elderly Alliance =

Defunct political party in the Netherlands

General Elderly Alliance Algemeen Ouderen Verbond
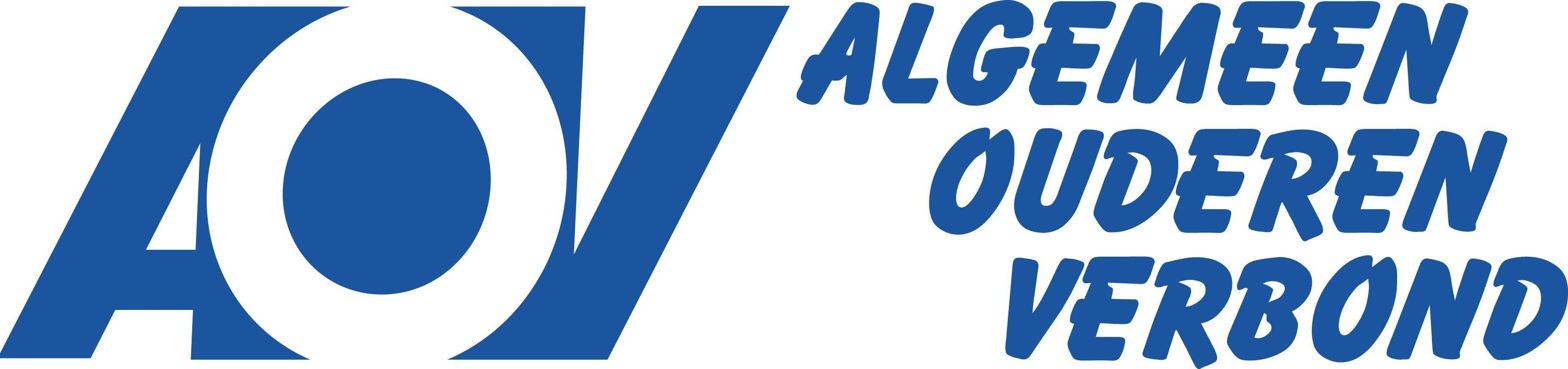
- Abbreviation: AOV
- Founded: 1 December 1993
- Dissolved: 2002
- Ideology: Pensioners' interests

The General Elderly Alliance (Dutch: Algemeen Ouderen Verbond, AOV) was a Dutch pensioners' political party. The AOV was very successful in the 1994 elections, but disappeared four years later.

== History ==
The AOV was founded on 1 December 1993 by Martin Batenburg. The direct cause for the formation of the AOV were budget cuts on retirement homes. During the 1994 election campaign one of the governing parties, the CDA, announced that it would cut government pensions. This made the AOV very attractive to the elderly. During the campaign, the party organized several successful mass protests against budget cuts. The party won six seats. The Union 55+, another party aiming to represent the elderly, also won one seat.

In the autumn of 1994, a conflict developed in the party between Nijpels and the party's founder Batenburg. This results in a split within the parliamentary party and the party board. After the split there was no party in parliament which was allowed to call itself AOV by the presidium. In the 1995 Senate election, the party won two seats, one of which was taken by Batenburg, who immediately became an independent. In 1998, the party's sole senator joined the CDA. In the elections of the same year, the AOV formed a new party, the Elderly Union (Ouderenunie), whilst Batenburg also participated in the election as the New Solidary Elderly Alliance. All were unable to win a seat.

== Ideology ==
The party was a typical one issue party: it sought to better the position of the elderly, by increasing government pensions.

== Election results ==
=== House of Representatives ===
Election	Lead candidate	List	Votes		Seats	Ref.
Election	Lead candidate	List	No.	%	Seats	Ref.
1994	Jet Nijpels	List			6 / 150	

=== Senate ===
Election	Lead candidate	List	Votes		Seats	Ref.
Election	Lead candidate	List	No.	%	Seats	Ref.
1995		List			2 / 75	

== Representation ==
=== Members of the House of Representatives ===
Name	Start	End	Ref.
Liesbeth Aiking-van Wageningen	17 May 1994	28 August 1995 (Note: Left the parliamentary group but remained in the House.)	
Leo Boogaard	17 May 1994	28 August 1995	
Theo Hendriks	17 May 1994	11 October 1994	
Ron Meyer	1 September 1996	1 September 1996	
Jet Nijpels	17 May 1994	28 August 1995	
Will Verkerk	17 May 1994	30 March 1998	
Cees van Wingerden	17 May 1994	18 May 1998	

== Electorate ==
The party was supported by elderly, especially by former CDA-voters from the Southern provinces, North Brabant and Limburg.
