= 1994 Dutch general election =

- 3 May 1994
- All 150 seats in the House of Representatives; 76 seats needed for a majority
- Turnout: 78.8% (▼1.5 pp)
Party	Leader	Vote %	Seats	+/–
PvdA	Wim Kok	24.0%	37	−12
CDA	Elco Brinkman	22.2%	34	−20
VVD	Frits Bolkestein	20.0%	31	+9
D66	Hans van Mierlo	15.5%	24	+12
AOV	Jet Nijpels	3.6%	6	New
GL	Ina Brouwer • Mohamed Rabbae	3.5%	5	−1
CD	Hans Janmaat	2.5%	3	+2
RPF	Leen van Dijke	1.8%	3	+2
SGP	Bas van der Vlies	1.7%	2	−1
GPV	Gert Schutte	1.3%	2	0
SP	Jan Marijnissen	1.3%	2	+2
U55+	Bertus Leerkes	0.9%	1	+1
This lists parties that won seats. See the complete results below.
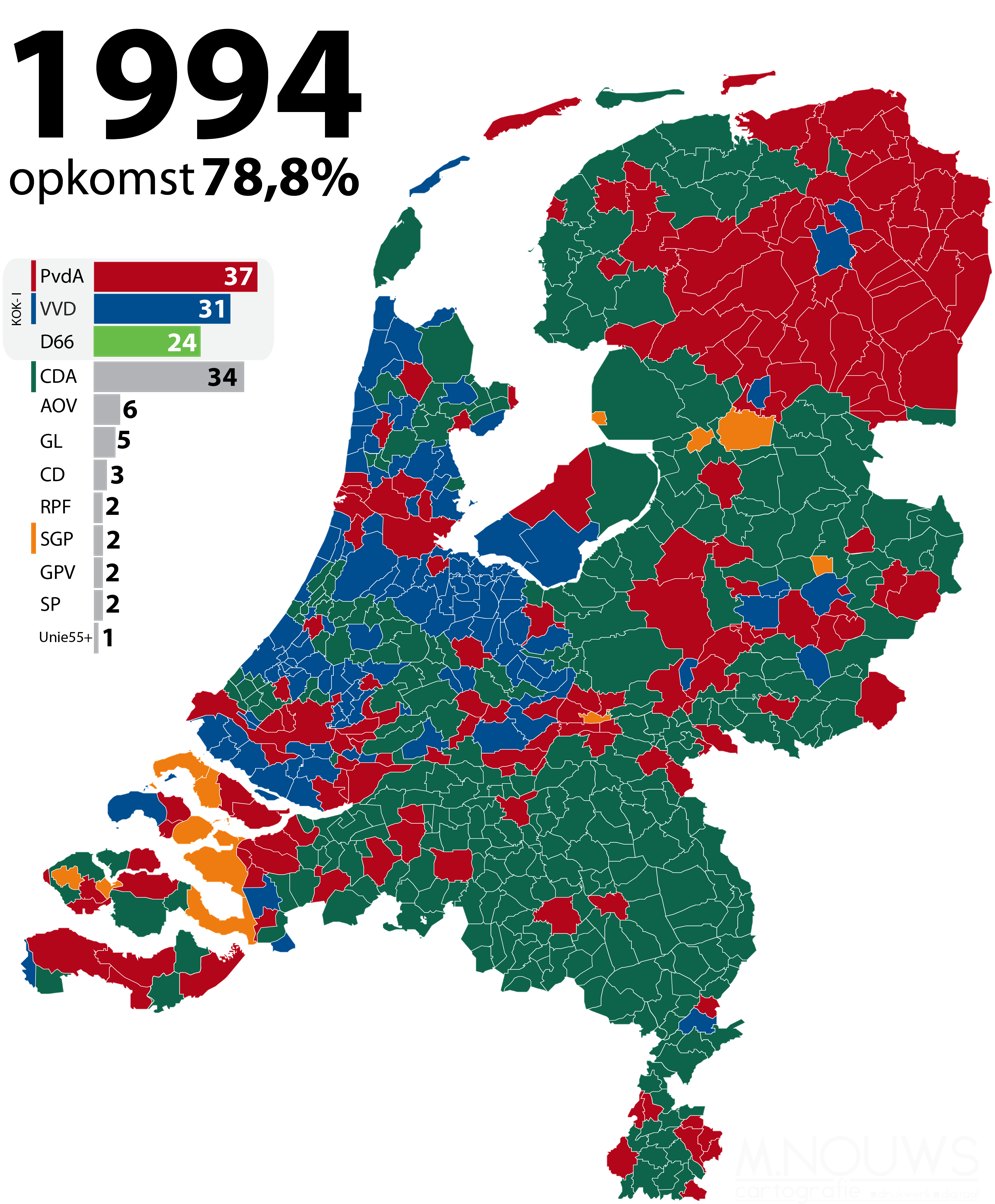
Most voted-for party by municipality
Cabinet before	Cabinet after
Third Lubbers cabinet CDA–PvdA	First Kok cabinet PvdA–VVD–D66

General elections were held in the Netherlands on 3 May 1994. The Labour Party emerged as the largest party, winning 37 of the 150 seats in the House of Representatives. The election resulted in significant losses for both the Labour Party and the Christian Democratic Appeal. The two liberal parties, People's Party for Freedom and Democracy and Democrats 66 made large gains, whilst two pro-elderly parties and the Socialist Party all passed the electoral threshold to win seats.

The formation of a government coalition was arduous but after four months the First Kok cabinet was formed. It was an unprecedented coalition of the two liberal parties and Labour. The CDA was consigned to opposition for the first time in its history. It was also the first government since 1918 not to include a Christian Democratic party.

== Background ==
Before the 1994 general election opinion polls predicted that the Centre Democrats party could win more than five seats in the House of Representatives. However, media reports claiming that some newly elected local members had extremist pasts damaged the Centre Democrats' prospects. A secret recording broadcast on national television one week before the election showed an Amsterdam council member bragging about having set immigrant centers on fire in the early 1980s. In the election that followed, the Centre Democrats won 2.5% of the vote and three seats in the House of Representatives (Janmaat was joined by Wil Schuurman and Cor Zonneveld), well below earlier expectations. Janmaat claimed that the relatively poor result was a result of an anti-CD campaign in the media. Due to its growth, and questions arising amongst the other parties over the development of a multicultural society, political opponents began to confront the Centre Democrats directly rather than maintain a strict cordon sanitaire around it.

== Results ==
Party	Votes	%	Seats	+/–
Labour Party	2,153,135	23.97	37	–12
Christian Democratic Appeal	1,996,418	22.23	34	–20
People's Party for Freedom and Democracy	1,792,401	19.96	31	+9
Democrats 66	1,391,202	15.49	24	+12
General Elderly Alliance	326,401	3.63	6	New
GroenLinks	311,399	3.47	5	–1
Centre Democrats	220,734	2.46	3	+2
Reformatory Political Federation	158,705	1.77	3	+2
Reformed Political Party	155,251	1.73	2	–1
Reformed Political League	119,158	1.33	2	0
Socialist Party	118,768	1.32	2	+2
Union 55+	78,147	0.87	1	New
Centre Party '86	32,327	0.36	0	New
Natural Law Party	27,665	0.31	0	New
Free Indian Party	17,230	0.19	0	New
The Greens	13,902	0.15	0	0
New Communist Party–NCPN	11,630	0.13	0	New
Solidarity Farmers' Party	9,096	0.10	0	New
Party for Environment and Justice	8,716	0.10	0	New
Solidarity '93	7,919	0.09	0	New
Pacifist Socialist Party '92	7,385	0.08	0	New
New Party	6,825	0.08	0	New
General Democratic Party	5,196	0.06	0	New
Patriotic Democratic Appeal	4,845	0.05	0	New
Socialist Alternative Politics	4,347	0.05	0	0
Libertarian Party	2,754	0.03	0	New
Total	8,981,556	100.00	150	0
Valid votes	8,981,556	99.56		
Invalid/blank votes	39,727	0.44		
Total votes	9,021,283	100.00		
Registered voters/turnout	11,455,924	78.75		
Source: Kiesraad

=== By province ===
Results by province
Province	PvdA	CDA	VVD	D66	AOV	GL	CD	RPF	SGP	GPV	SP	U55+	Others
Drenthe	34.5	19.8	18.2	13.9	2.1	2.5	1.2	1.7	0.2	2.4	1.0	0.6	1.8
Flevoland	20.1	17.6	23.6	17.0	4.2	3.1	2.4	2.8	2.4	2.1	1.3	1.0	2.4
Friesland	31.6	27.5	14.2	12.5	2.2	3.0	1.1	2.6	0.6	2.2	0.6	0.4	1.9
Gelderland	23.8	24.7	18.3	15.3	2.8	3.3	1.8	2.7	3.2	1.1	1.0	0.6	1.7
Groningen	34.8	17.3	14.2	14.1	2.8	4.5	1.3	1.8	0.2	4.5	1.7	0.6	1.3
Limburg	24.5	28.9	14.8	14.5	5.4	3.2	3.0	0.2	0.1	0.4	2.2	1.0	1.4
North Brabant	21.0	27.1	18.1	16.3	5.7	2.8	2.8	0.5	0.5	0.4	2.2	1.0	2.8
North Holland	24.9	16.2	24.5	17.2	4.1	4.9	2.3	0.9	0.3	0.6	0.9	1.0	1.6
Overijssel	24.2	29.6	15.4	12.9	2.1	2.5	1.5	3.2	2.1	2.9	0.8	1.2	1.6
South Holland	22.2	18.3	23.4	15.8	3.2	3.1	3.5	2.1	3.0	1.2	1.5	0.8	1.8
Utrecht	19.1	20.6	23.2	16.9	2.9	4.7	2.4	2.5	2.3	2.0	0.9	0.8	1.5
Zeeland	22.4	20.9	18.8	13.5	3.7	2.4	2.8	3.0	7.9	1.8	0.6	0.9	2.2

=== 5 largest municipalities ===
Results in the five largest municipalities
Municipality	PvdA	CDA	VVD	D66	AOV	GL	CD	RPF	SGP	GPV	SP	Unie 55+	Others
Amsterdam	33.2 (116 425)	7.9 (27 711)	18.3 (64 228)	17.7 (62 194)	4.2 (14 567)	8.5 (29 931)	3.7 (12 893)	0.4 (1 517)	0.1 (324)	0.3 (1 194)	1.5 (5 386)	0.9 (3 292)	3.1 (10 427)
Rotterdam	30.8 (89 516)	11.6 (33 716)	18.2 (52 864)	14.9 (43 224)	4.5 (13 027)	4.4 (12 744)	6.5 (19 016)	1.0 (2 941)	1.1 (3 244)	0.9 (2 737)	2.2 (6 438)	1.0 (2 863)	2.9 (8 242)
The Hague	23.5 (55 918)	14.2 (33 690)	26.2 (62 388)	15.7 (37 318)	3.6 (8 494)	4.2 (10 051)	4.9 (11 732)	0.9 (2 243)	0.7 (1 680)	0.8 (1 837)	1.5 (3 574)	1.2 (2 797)	2.6 (6 207)
(Utrecht (municipality)) Utrecht	26.3 (35 357)	12.9 (17 335)	15.7 (21 143)	19.9 (26 683)	3.4 (4 554)	10.5 (14 126)	4.3 (5 714)	0.8 (1 014)	0.4 (511)	0.8 (1 056)	2.2 (3 009)	0.8 (1 006)	2.1 (2 838)
Eindhoven	20.6 (23 413)	19.9 (22 530)	16.3 (18 469)	17.9 (20 309)	12.4 (14 104)	4.4 (4 947)	2.8 (3 126)	0.6 (638)	0.2 (201)	0.6 (645)	2.1 (2 327)	0.6 (630)	1.9 (2 388)
