= GertJan Nijpels =

Dutch politician (1951–2021)

- Born: 10 June 1951; Den Helder, the Netherlands
- Died: 8 February 2021 (aged 69); Opmeer, the Netherlands
- Occupation: Vorstand

G. J. A. M. "GertJan" Nijpels (10 June 1951 – 8 February 2021) was a Dutch administrator and a politician of the People's Party for Freedom and Democracy. He was the mayor of the municipality of Opmeer from 15 May 2005 until 8 February 2021, after serving as acting mayor from 15 June 2004 until 15 May 2005. Nijpels was due to retire during mid-2021, but died suddenly at the age of 69 on 8 February 2021.

== Biography ==
From 1990 to 1999, Nijpels was an alderman of Den Helder. Later, his career included work as a management consultant, interim manager, project manager, and trainer at LMI Europe BV. He held that position for two years prior to becoming the director of Holland Stores Group BV for several years.

On 15 June 2004, Nijpels was appointed as interim mayor of Opmeer. Almost a year later, on 15 May 2005, he became the mayor of that municipality by royal decree. Nijpels announced that he would retire on 1 July 2021. However, he died abruptly on 8 February 2021.

In addition to his executive position, Nijpels served as the chairman of the Supervisory Board of Stichting Special Education for Den Helder and surroundings, Secretary of the General Board of Stichting Noorderlicht (supervisor Tetrix Bedrijfsopleidingen BV), and honorary chairman of Stichting Landbouwtentoonstelling Opmeer.

== Death ==
Nijpels died of cardiac arrest during the night of 7–8 February 2021. He had intended to pay a visit to the Aartswoud Cattle Museum, where a hay barn had caught on fire, but he is presumed to have died en route. Heavy snow fell that night as an effect of a major weather event, Storm Darcy. After resuscitation attempts failed, Nijpels was pronounced dead.
