= Agnes van Ardenne =

Dutch politician and diplomat

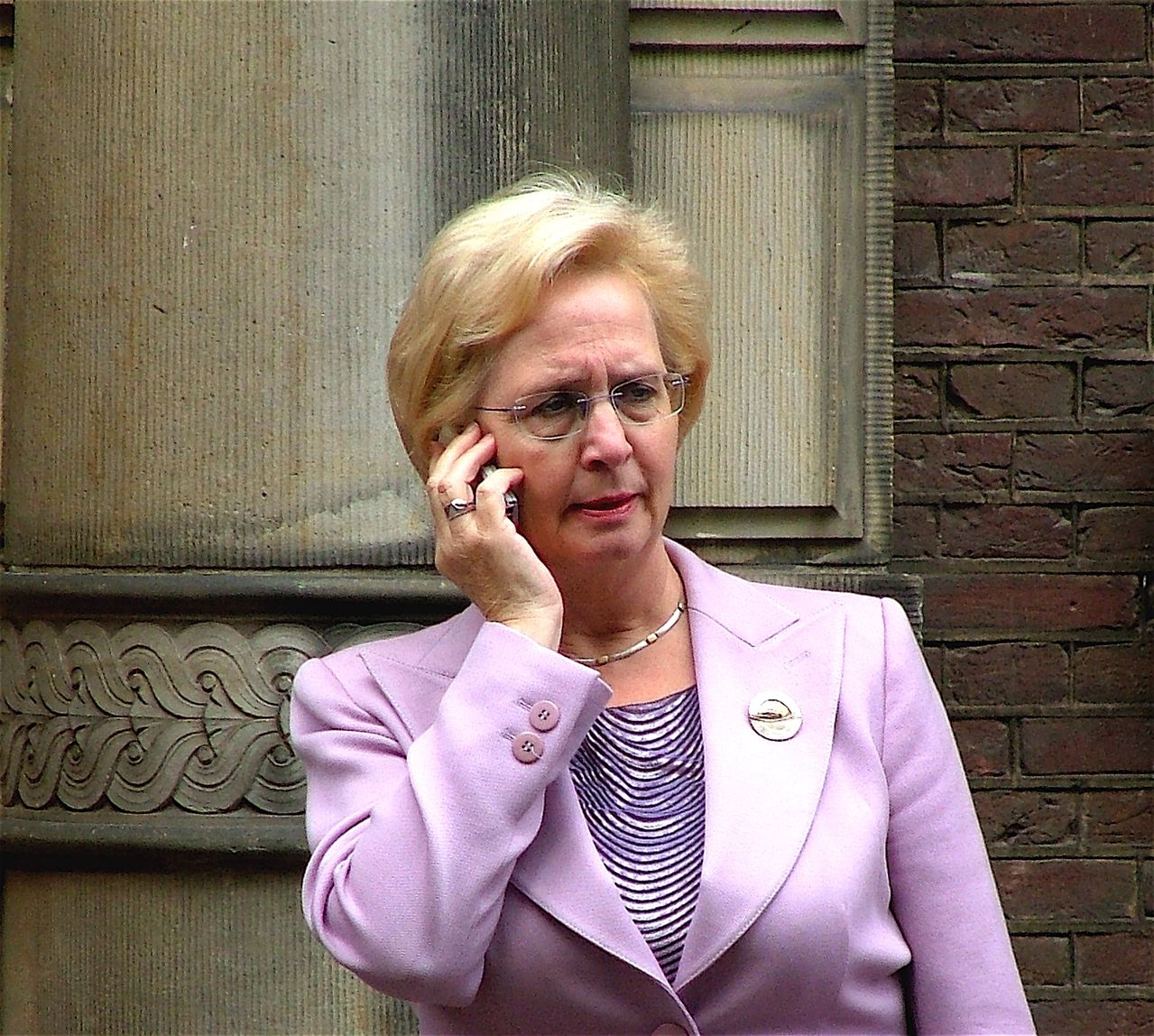
- Van Ardenne in 2006

Mayor of Westland
- In office 28 September 2017 – 18 December 2018; Ad interim
- Preceded by: Sjaak van der Tak
- Succeeded by: Bouke Arends

Permanent Representative of the Netherlands to the FAO, IFAD and WFP
- In office 1 April 2007 – 1 July 2011
- Preceded by: Unknown
- Succeeded by: Gerda Verburg

Minister for Development Cooperation
- In office 27 May 2003 – 22 February 2007
- Prime Minister: Jan Peter Balkenende
- Preceded by: Eveline Herfkens (2002)
- Succeeded by: Bert Koenders

State Secretary for Foreign Affairs
- In office 22 July 2002 – 27 May 2003 Serving with Atzo Nicolaï
- Prime Minister: Jan Peter Balkenende
- Preceded by: Dick Benschop
- Succeeded by: Atzo Nicolaï

Member of the House of Representatives
- In office 30 January 2003 – 27 May 2003
- In office 17 May 1994 – 22 July 2002

Personal details
- Born: Anna Maria Agnes van der Hoeven; 21 January 1950 (age 76) Maasland, Netherlands
- Party: Christian Democratic Appeal (from 1980)
- Other political affiliations: Catholic People's Party (until 1980)
- Spouse: Jozef van Ardenne (m. 1977)
- Occupation: Politician · Diplomat · Civil servant · Nonprofit director

Anna Maria Agnes "Agnes" van Ardenne-Van der Hoeven (born 21 January 1950) is a retired Dutch politician and diplomat of the Christian Democratic Appeal (CDA).

== Career ==
Agnes van Ardenne was born in Maasland in 1950. Before taking office as a member of the Cabinet of the Netherlands, she was the Deputy Chairwoman of the Netherlands-based Catholic Organisation for Relief and Development Aid (CORDAID) and Secretary General of the UNICEF National Committee of the Netherlands. While sitting in the House of Representatives between 1994 and 2002, she was a member of the parliament's delegations to the Parliamentary Assembly of the Council of Europe (PACE).

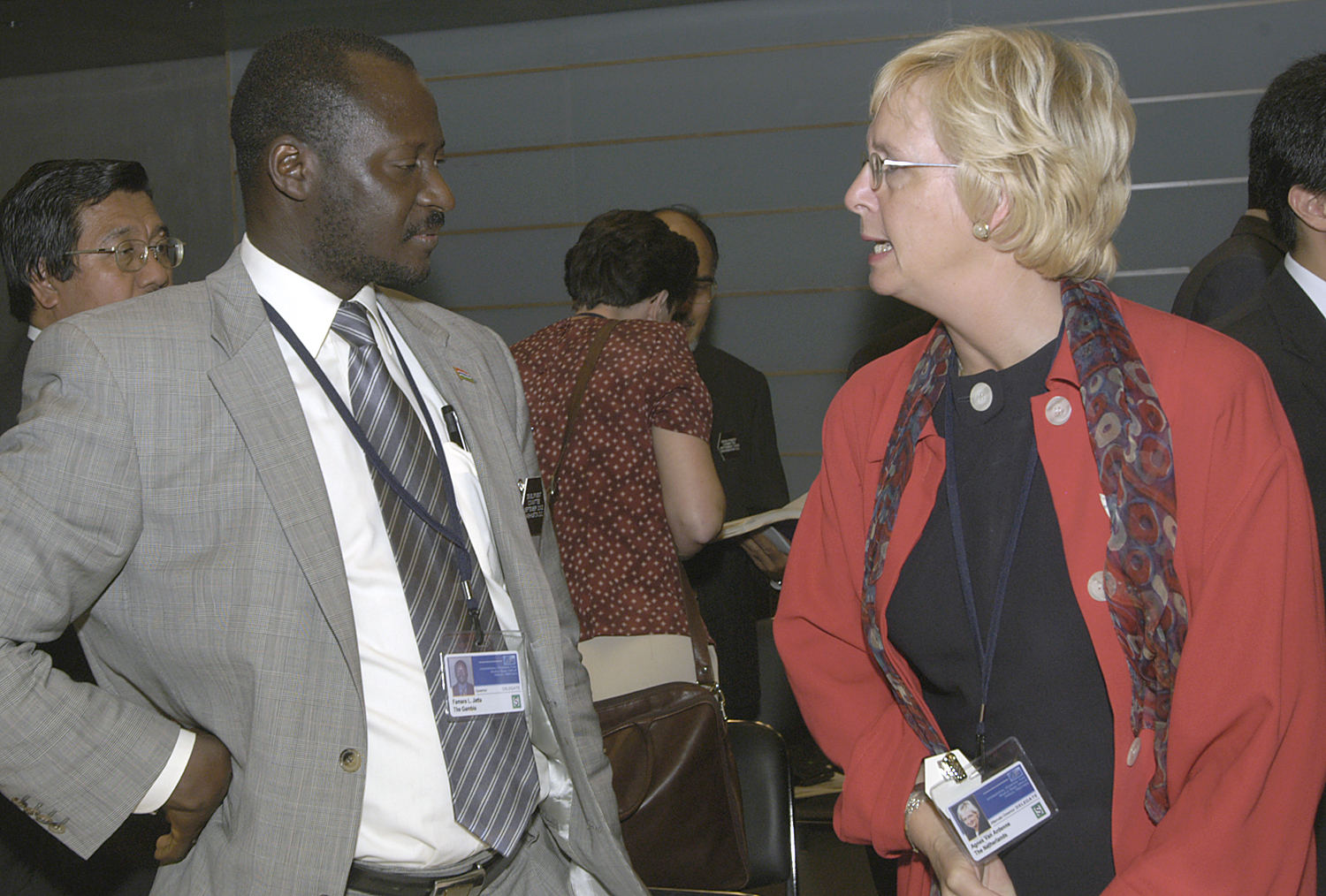
Secretary of State for Finance and Economic Affairs of Gambia Famara Jatta and State Secretary Agnes van Ardenne at the International Monetary Fund in Washington, D.C., on 28 September 2002.

Between 2002 and 2007, van Ardenne served as Minister for Development Cooperation in the cabinet of Prime Minister Jan Peter Balkenende. When the Netherlands held the presidency of the Council of the European Union in 2004, she chaired the meetings of the EU Development Ministers.

During her time in office, van Ardenne focused on fragile states and countries in conflict, including Sudan. She chose to concentrate Dutch bilateral development cooperation on Africa (at least 50% of the bilateral budget). In 2006, she ordered a suspension of nearly $150 million in aid to the government of President Mwai Kibaki of Kenya because of concerns over corruption.

Van Ardenne was one of the first foreign dignitaries to visit Pakistan after the 2005 Kashmir earthquake, to witness the emergency aid operation still being conducted at full capacity.

In 2006, van Ardenne increased the Netherlands’ support to post-primary and higher education to 110 million euros per year from the earlier level of 60 million euros, and increased its contribution to the Education for All Fast Track Initiative (FTI) to 150 million euros in 2006 and subsequent years.

Also in 2006, van Ardenne significantly increased the Dutch contribution to the Global Alliance for Vaccines and Immunization (GAVI), pledging nearly €100 million over four years for global vaccination and programmes to strengthen health systems. In what was the single largest earmarked donation UNICEF had received in its then 60-year history, van Ardenne later pledged $201 million over four years to expand the agency's ongoing efforts to ensure that children in conflict, natural disasters and emerging from crisis can go to school.

After leaving office, van Ardenne worked as her country’s Permanent Representative to the Food and Agriculture Organization (FAO), the World Food Programme (WFP) and the International Fund for Agricultural Development (IFAD) in Rome from 2007 until 2011. She was succeeded by Gerda Verburg.

Between 2011 and 2014, van Ardenne served as chairwoman of the Dutch Product Board for Horticulture. Since 2017, she has been chairwoman of the Netherlands Inspection Service for Horticulture.

== Other activities ==
=== International organizations ===
- African Development Bank (AfDB), Ex-Officio Alternate Member of the Board of Governors (2003-2007)
- Asian Development Bank (ADB), Ex-Officio Alternate Member of the Board of Governors (2003-2007)
- World Bank, Ex-Officio Alternate Member of the Board of Governors (2003-2007)

=== Non-profit organizations ===
- African Studies Centre (ASC) at Leiden University, Chairwoman of the Board of Governors (since 2013)
- Council for the Environment and Infrastructure (RLI), Member (since 2012)
- Van Hall Larenstein, President of the Supervisory Board
- Marga Klompé Foundation, Chairwoman of the Board

== Political positions ==
On 30 March 2012, van Ardenne and several other prominent CDA members, including former Prime Ministers Ruud Lubbers and Piet de Jong, signed a petition of disapproval on the proposed cuts to the budget of international development by the first cabinet of Prime Minister Mark Rutte.

== Decorations ==
Honours
Ribbon bar	Honour	Country	Date	Comment
	Officer of the Order of Orange-Nassau	Netherlands	11 April 2007	

Political offices
Preceded by Dick Benschop	State Secretary for Foreign Affairs; 2002–2003; Served alongside: Atzo Nicolaï	Succeeded by Atzo Nicolaï
Vacant Title last held by Eveline Herfkens	Minister for Development Cooperation; 2003–2007	Succeeded by Bert Koenders
Preceded by Sjaak van der Tak	Mayor of Westland; Ad interim 2017–2018	Succeeded by Bouke Arends
Diplomatic posts
Unknown	Permanent Representative of the Netherlands to the FAO, IFAD and WFP; 2007–2011	Succeeded by Gerda Verburg
