= Nico Verlaan =

Dutch politician

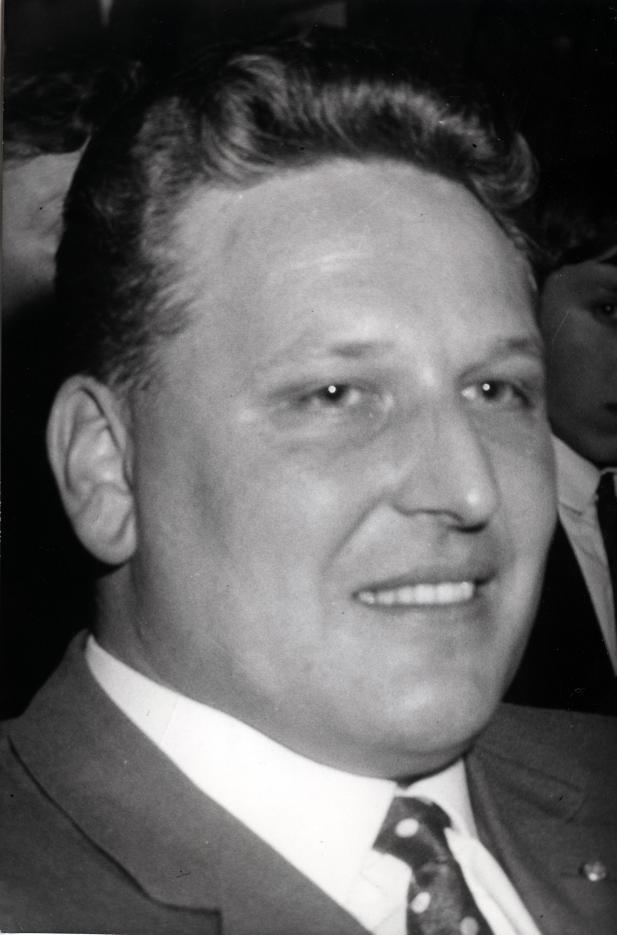
Nico Verlaan

Nicolaas (Nico) Verlaan (born 12 August 1932, Amsterdam) is a Dutch former politician of the Farmers' Party (Boerenpartij).

Verlaan was an MP from 1967 to 1971. He was also a member of the municipal council of Amsterdam and a member of the provincial parliament of North Holland.
