= Leen van Dijke =

Dutch politician (born 1955)

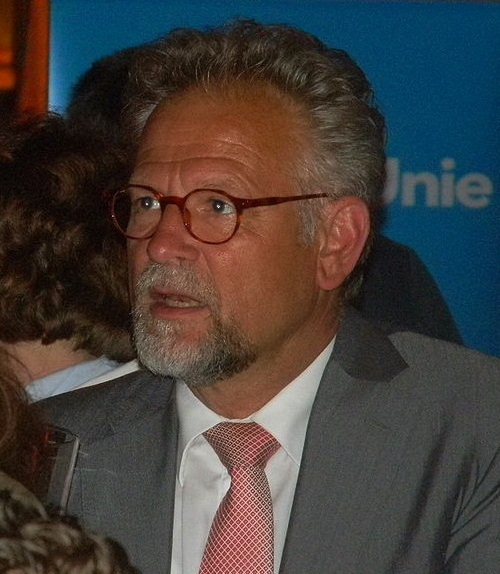
- Leen van Dijke in 2010

Parliamentary leader in the House of Representatives
- In office 13 March 2001 – 23 May 2002
- Preceded by: Office established
- Succeeded by: Kars Veling
- In office 17 May 1994 – 13 March 2001
- Preceded by: Meindert Leerling
- Succeeded by: Office discontinued

Leader of the Reformatory Political Federation
- In office 17 May 1994 – 13 March 2001
- Preceded by: Meindert Leerling
- Succeeded by: Office discontinued

Member of the House of Representatives
- In office 17 May 1994 – 30 January 2003

Personal details
- Born: Leendert Cornelis van Dijke; 3 September 1955 (age 70) Oosterland, Netherlands
- Party: Christian Union (from 2002)
- Other political affiliations: Reformatory Political Federation (until 2002)
- Occupation: Politician · Civil servant · Management consultant · Public relations manager · Carpenter

Leendert Cornelis "Leen" van Dijke (born 3 September 1955) is a Dutch retired politician and management consultant. A member of the now-defunct Reformatory Political Federation (RPF), he was its last party leader from 1994 to 2001; he co-founded the Christian Union (CU) as a merger of the RPF and Reformed Political League (GPV). Van Dijke sat in the House of Representatives from 1994 to 2003.

== Career ==
Originally a carpenter, Van Dijke was a member of the Provincial Council of Zeeland as a member of the Reformatory Political Federation from 1987 to 1994. In 1993, the relatively obscure Van Dijke was chosen to succeed Meindert Leerling as parliamentary leader following the RPF's disappointing performance during the late 1980s and early 1990s.

Under Van Dijke, the party underwent a radical ideological shift. Whereas the RPF had staunchly opposed government intervention in the economy and the welfare state throughout the 1980s, a new political platform passed in 1994 abandoned these principles in favour of an active state role in solving social problems. The party also began to focus on new political issues, such as environmental protection, presenting itself as a more socially minded alternative to the Christian Democratic Appeal. At the same time, the RPF remained strongly socially conservative. These shifts led to a resounding electoral victory in the 1994 Dutch general election, where the RPF tripled its seat count from 1 to 3 seats.

Van Dijke would serve as a member of the House of Representatives from 1994 to 2003 as well as parliamentary leader from 1994 to 2002 and its successor the Christian Union (ChristenUnie), which he co-founded as a merger of the RPF and GPV. In parliament, he spoke out against the teaching of the theory of evolution in schools. In 1996, Van Dijke caused controversy when he questioned why a "practicing homosexual" would be any better morally than a thief. He would be officially charged in 1998 and fined for discrimination, a verdict which was eventuallynoverturned by the Supreme Court of the Netherlands in 2001. In 2001, he became the first parliamentary leader of the newly founded Christian Union, and was succeeded by Kars Veling a year later.

Party political offices
Preceded by Meindert Leerling	Lead candidate of the Reformatory Political Federation; 1994, 1998	Party merged into Christian Union
Preceded by Meindert Leerling	Leader of the Reformatory Political Federation; 1994–2001	Party merged into Christian Union
Preceded by Meindert Leerling	Parliamentary leader of the Reformatory Political Federation in the House of Representatives; 1994–2001	Party merged into Christian Union
New political party	Parliamentary leader of the Christian Union in the House of Representatives; 2001–2002	Succeeded by Kars Veling
