= Mobile Netherlands =

Political party in the Netherlands

The Mobile Netherlands (Nederland Mobiel) is a political party in the Netherlands without parliamentary representation.

It was founded on December 5, 1997 by members of the PRO AUTO transport advocacy organization out of dissatisfaction with the policies of the Purple Kok coalition cabinet. Led by Jan Holsteijn and primarily concentrated in Spijkenisse, Mobile Netherlands primarily advocates for improvement of government-owned or regulated mobility and transport facilities.
