= Bertus Leerkes =

Dutch politician (1922–2000)

Heribertus Antonius Leerkes (22 August 1922 – 10 August 2000), generally known as Bertus Leerkes, was a Dutch politician who served as leader of the Union 55+ party from 1994 to 1998. During his term in parliament he was the oldest member in the House of Representatives.
