= 1998 Dutch general election =

- 6 May 1998
- All 150 seats in the House of Representatives; 76 seats needed for a majority
- Turnout: 73.35% (▼5.40pp)
Party	Leader	Vote %	Seats	+/–
PvdA	Wim Kok	28.98	45	+8
VVD	Frits Bolkestein	24.69	38	+7
CDA	Jaap de Hoop Scheffer	18.37	29	−5
D66	Els Borst	8.99	14	−10
GL	Paul Rosenmöller	7.27	11	+6
SP	Jan Marijnissen	3.53	5	+3
RPF	Leen van Dijke	2.03	3	0
SGP	Bas van der Vlies	1.78	3	+1
GPV	Gert Schutte	1.26	2	0
This lists parties that won seats. See the complete results below.
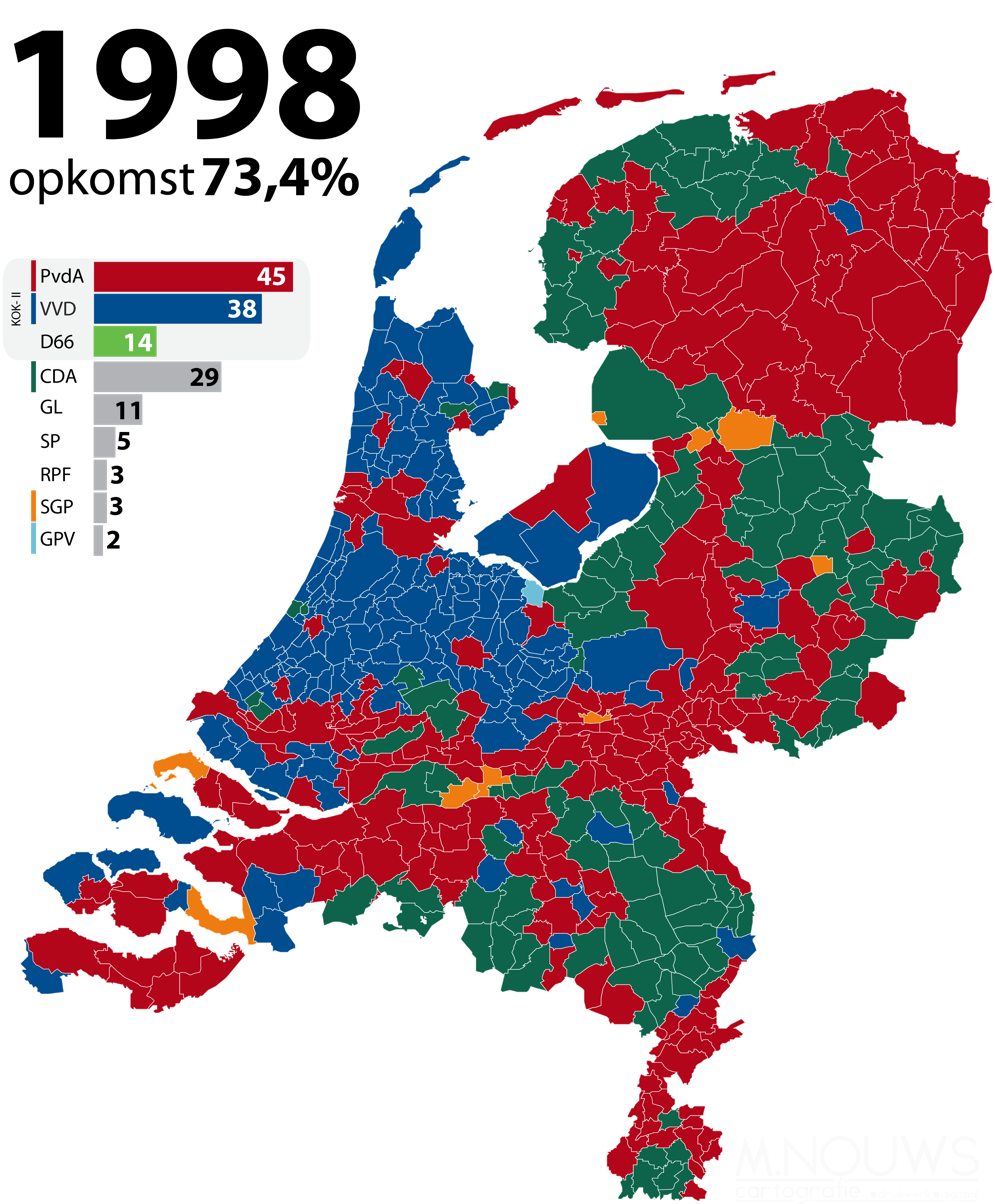
Most voted-for party by municipality
Cabinet before	Cabinet after
First Kok cabinet PvdA–VVD–D66	Second Kok cabinet PvdA–VVD–D66

General elections were held in the Netherlands on 6 May 1998. The elections saw the purple coalition of social democrats and liberals (left and right) strengthen its majority. Both the social democratic Labour Party (PvdA) and the conservative liberal People's Party for Freedom and Democracy (VVD) won considerably, much at the cost of their junior coalition partner, the social liberal Democrats 66 (D66).

Political observers attributed the win to the economic performance of the coalition, including the reduction of unemployment and the budget deficit, steady growth and job creation, combined with wage freezes and trimming of the welfare state, together with a policy of fiscal restraint.

The two small left opposition parties, the green GroenLinks, and the Socialist Party, were rewarded for their 'quality opposition'. The major opposition party, the Christian Democratic Appeal (CDA), after being in opposition for the first time in its history, also lost seats, and also failed to secure the most votes in the country's southernmost provinces North Brabant and Limburg for the first time ever. The two parties for the elderly AOV and Union 55+ and the right-wing populist CD did not return to parliament.

The formation resulted in the continuation of the Kok cabinet with the second Kok cabinet, consisting of the PvdA, VVD and D66, even though the latter was not necessary for a majority of 76 seats.

== Results ==
Party	Votes	%	Seats	+/–
Labour Party	2,494,555	28.98	45	+8
People's Party for Freedom and Democracy	2,124,971	24.69	38	+7
Christian Democratic Appeal	1,581,053	18.37	29	–5
Democrats 66	773,497	8.99	14	–10
GroenLinks	625,968	7.27	11	+6
Socialist Party	303,703	3.53	5	+3
Reformatory Political Federation	174,593	2.03	3	0
Reformed Political Party	153,583	1.78	3	+1
Reformed Political League	108,724	1.26	2	0
Centre Democrats	52,226	0.61	0	–3
General Elderly Alliance–Union 55+	45,994	0.53	0	–7
Mobile Netherlands	45,219	0.53	0	New
Seniors 2000	36,157	0.42	0	New
New Middle Party	23,512	0.27	0	New
The Greens	16,585	0.19	0	0
Natural Law Party	15,746	0.18	0	0
Catholic Political Party	8,233	0.10	0	New
Free Indian Party	7,225	0.08	0	0
New Solidarity Elderly Union	6,455	0.07	0	New
New Communist Party–NCPN	5,620	0.07	0	0
Idealists/Jij	2,500	0.03	0	New
The Voters Collective	1,668	0.02	0	New
Total	8,607,787	100.00	150	0
Valid votes	8,607,787	99.83		
Invalid/blank votes	14,435	0.17		
Total votes	8,622,222	100.00		
Registered voters/turnout	11,755,132	73.35		
Source: Kiesraad

=== By province ===
Results by province
Province	PvdA	VVD	CDA	D66	GL	SP	RPF	SGP	GPV	Others
Drenthe	37.3	21.6	17.9	8.1	5.6	2.9	1.9	0.2	2.4	2.1
Flevoland	25.8	29.1	14.8	9.0	6.6	2.7	3.3	2.3	2.2	4.2
Friesland	33.6	16.4	26.4	7.0	6.8	3.2	2.4	0.5	1.9	1.8
Gelderland	29.0	23.0	20.4	8.1	6.7	2.9	3.1	3.3	1.1	2.4
Groningen	37.1	16.4	16.0	8.6	8.1	4.3	1.9	0.2	4.5	2.9
Limburg	29.9	21.3	24.3	7.4	7.5	5.0	0.2	0.0	0.2	4.2
North Brabant	28.9	24.5	21.5	8.4	6.7	5.3	0.6	0.4	0.3	3.4
North Holland	28.4	29.2	12.5	11.5	9.7	3.1	1.0	0.3	0.5	3.8
Overijssel	29.0	18.7	26.7	6.6	5.6	2.6	3.2	2.3	2.9	2.4
South Holland	27.7	28.0	14.6	9.4	6.7	3.4	2.6	3.1	1.1	3.4
Utrecht	23.6	27.7	16.0	11.4	8.6	2.6	3.0	2.4	2.0	2.7
Zeeland	27.8	23.3	17.2	6.9	5.5	2.8	3.6	8.3	1.8	2.8

=== 5 largest municipalities ===
Results in the five largest municipalities
Municipality	PvdA	VVD	CDA	D66	GL	SP	RPF	SGP	GPV	Others
Amsterdam	32.3 (107 065)	22.2 (73 757)	6.1 (20 214)	14.3 (47 612)	15.0 (49 731)	4.5 (14 890)	0.5 (1 671)	0.1 (319)	0.3 (943)	4.8 (15 752)
Rotterdam	36.4 (96 189)	22.8 (60 256)	9.3 (24 525)	9.1 (24 147)	8.8 (23 298)	6.0 (15 810)	1.2 (3 219)	1.0 (2 742)	0.9 (2 395)	4.5 (11 958)
The Hague	27.8 (60 511)	30.7 (66 875)	11.6 (25 309)	11.1 (24 079)	8.9 (19 442)	3.7 (8 035)	1.1 (2 466)	0.6 (1 365)	0.7 (1 489)	3.7 (8 119)
(Utrecht (municipality)) Utrecht	29.2 (36 230)	20.1 (24 993)	9.6 (11 930)	15.2 (18 858)	15.7 (19 524)	4.7 (5 836)	1.0 (1 276)	0.3 (388)	0.7 (845)	3.3 (4 129)
Eindhoven	29.3 (30 197)	23.2 (23 943)	16.2 (16 698)	10.6 (10 874)	9.1 (9 328)	6.0 (6 153)	0.7 (681)	0.1 (114)	0.5 (501)	4.4 (4 550)

=== Maps ===
Results by province, shaded according to the vote share won by largest party

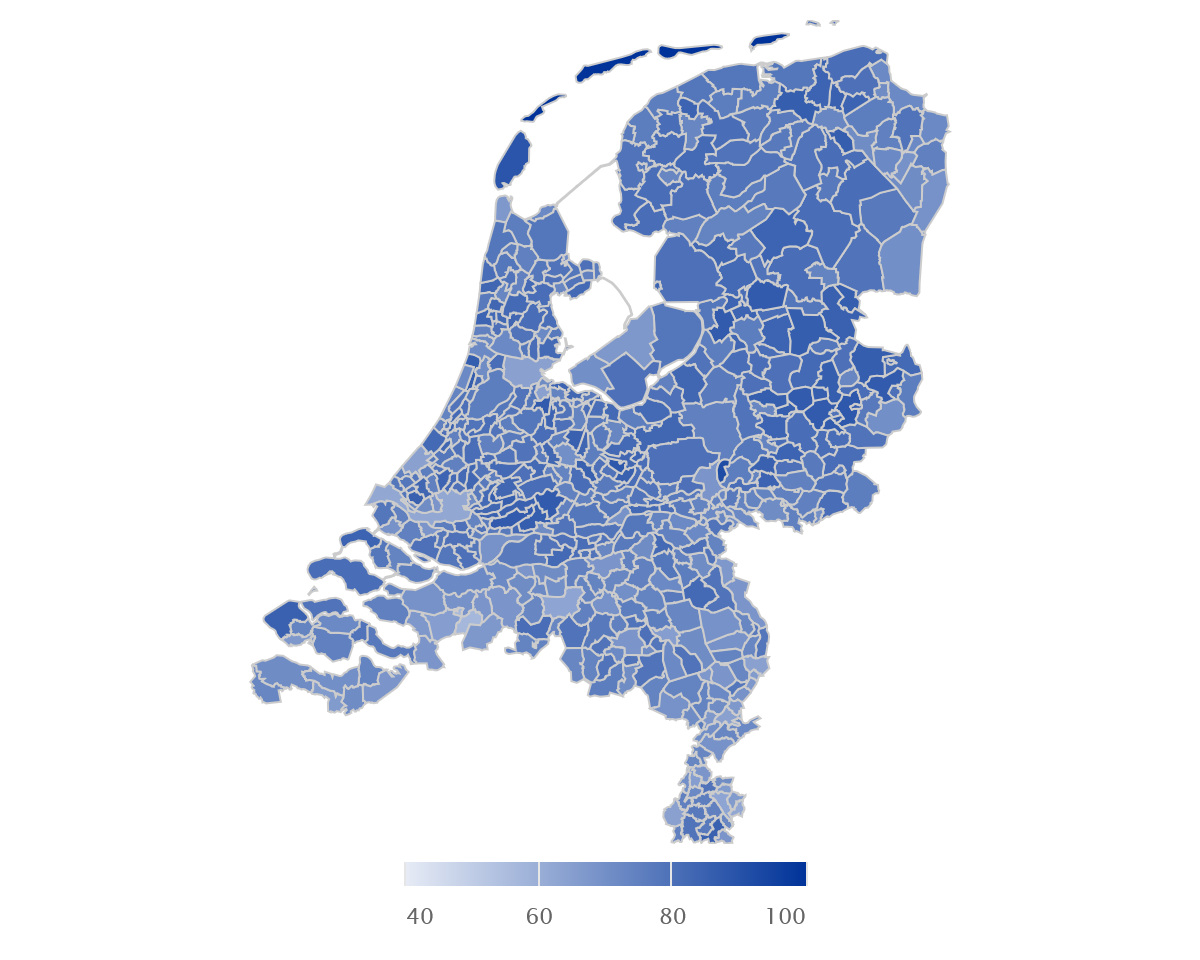
Voter turnout by municipality
