= List of members of the House of Representatives of the Netherlands for GroenLinks =

GreenLeft is a Dutch green political party. It was formed in 1989 as a merger of four parties: the left-socialist Pacifist Socialist Party, the communist Communist Party of the Netherlands, the progressive Christian Political Party of Radicals, and the progressive Christian Evangelical People's Party. Since 27 October 2023, the parliamentary group has merged with the Labour Party (PvdA) into GL-PvdA.

== List ==
Member	Start of term	End of term	Ref.
Naïma Azough	23 May 2002	29 January 2003	
Naïma Azough	16 March 2004	24 February 2009	
Naïma Azough	17 June 2009	16 June 2010	
Ria Beckers	14 September 1989	19 April 1993	
Niels van den Berge	12 January 2011	10 March 2011	
Niels van den Berge	5 June 2019	30 March 2021	
Kauthar Bouchallikht	31 March 2021	26 October 2023	
Bruno Braakhuis	17 June 2010	19 September 2012	
Arie van den Brand	23 March 2002	9 March 2004	
Laura Bromet	7 June 2018	26 October 2023	
Ina Brouwer	14 September 1989	16 May 1994	
Kathalijne Buitenweg	23 March 2017	30 March 2021	
Tofik Dibi	30 November 2006	19 September 2012	
Isabelle Diks	3 September 2008	20 December 2008	
Isabelle Diks	23 March 2017	30 April 2020	
Corinne Ellemeet	18 November 2014	8 March 2015	
Corinne Ellemeet	23 March 2017	26 October 2023	
Andrée van Es	14 September 1989	7 November 1990	
Arjan El Fassed	17 June 2010	19 September 2012	
Ineke van Gent	19 May 1998	19 September 2012	
Rik Grashoff	20 May 2015	6 June 2018	
Femke Halsema	19 May 1998	11 January 2011	
Ab Harrewijn	19 May 1998	12 May 2002	
Mathieu Heemelaar	3 March 2009	16 June 2009	
Corrie Hermann	19 May 1998	22 May 2002	
Paul Jungbluth	29 June 2005	29 November 2006	
Farah Karimi	19 May 1998	29 November 2006	
Jesse Klaver	17 June 2006	26 October 2023	
Suzanne Kröger	23 March 2017	30 March 2017	
Suzanne Kröger	27 October 2021	26 October 2023	
Peter Lankhorst	14 September 1989	16 May 1994	
Tom van der Lee	23 March 2017	26 October 2023	
Senna Maatoug	31 March 2021	26 October 2023	
Tom van den Nieuwenhuijzen	7 May 2020	30 March 2021	
Bram van Ojik	21 April 1993	16 May 1994	
Bram van Ojik	20 September 2012	19 May 2015	
Bram van Ojik	23 March 2017	30 March 2021	
Zihni Özdil	23 March 2017	5 June 2019	
Nevin Özütok	30 May 2006	29 November 2006	
Nevin Özütok	23 March 2017	30 March 2021	
Mariko Peters	30 November 2006	30 August 2008	
Mariko Peters	21 December 2008	22 November 2010	
Mariko Peters	11 March 2011	20 September 2012	
Tom Pitstra	12 June 2001	22 May 2002	
Mohamed Rabbae	17 May 1994	22 May 2002	
Wim-Jan Renkema	13 June 2018	30 March 2021	
Paul Rosenmöller	14 September 1989	29 January 2003	
Jolande Sap	1 September 2008	23 October 2012	
Tara Singh Varma	17 May 1994	29 May 2001	
Leoni Sipkes	8 November 1990	18 May 1998	
Paul Smeulders	6 June 2018	30 March 2021	
Bart Snels	23 March 2017	26 October 2021	
Hugo van der Steenhoven	19 May 1998	22 May 2002	
Liesbeth van Tongeren	17 June 2010	12 June 2018	
Evelien Tonkens	23 May 2002	28 June 2005	
Kees Vendrik	19 May 1998	17 June 2010	
Linda Voortman	17 June 2010	20 September 2012	
Linda Voortman	30 October 2012	18 November 2014	
Linda Voortman	9 March 2015	6 June 2018	
Marijke Vos	17 May 1994	22 May 2006	
Lisa Westerveld	23 March 2017	26 October 2023	
Wilbert Willems	14 September 1989	16 May 1994	
