= Corinne Ellemeet =

Dutch politician (born 1976)

Jonkvrouw Corinne de Jonge van Ellemeet
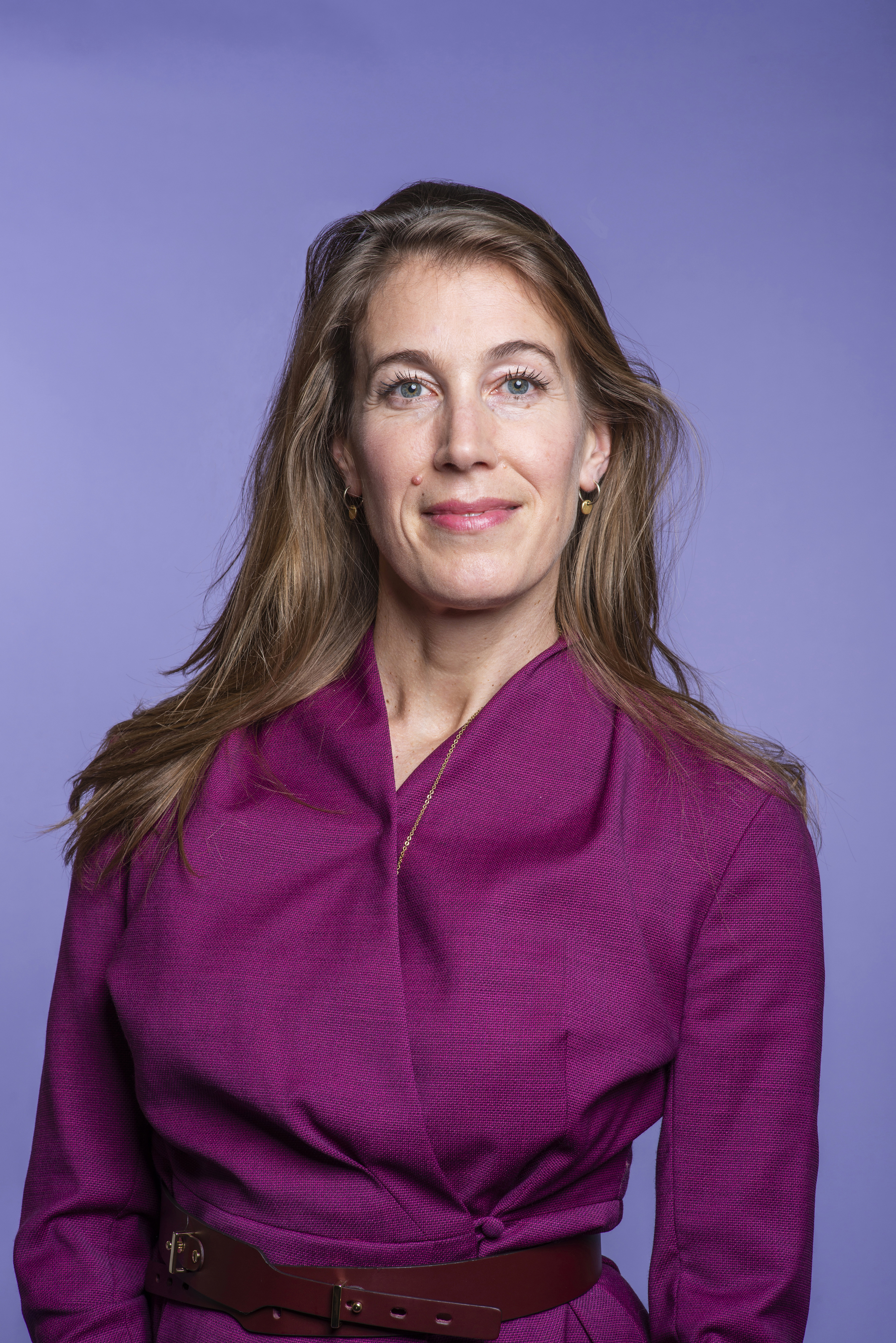

Member of the House of Representatives of the Netherlands
- In office 23 March 2017 – 5 December 2023
- In office 18 November 2014 – 9 March 2015

Personal details
- Born: 26 April 1976 (age 50) Rotterdam, Netherlands
- Party: GreenLeft
- Education: United World Colleges, University of Amsterdam, Smith College

Jkvr. Corinne Elisabeth de Jonge van Ellemeet (born 26 April 1976) is a Dutch politician.

In the parliamentary elections of 2017, she was elected to the House of Representatives for GreenLeft. Previously, she was a temporary member of the House of Representatives of the Netherlands for GreenLeft between 18 November 2014 and 9 March 2015, when she replaced Linda Voortman who went on maternity leave.

== Early life and education ==
Ellemeet is a member of the noble family De Jonge van Ellemeet and as such bears the nobility predicate "Jonkvrouw". She is related to the Brandt Corstius family through her mother; her mother is a first cousin of author and linguist Hugo Brandt Corstius (1935-2014). In her early youth Ellemeet lived on Bonaire. Thereafter she lived most of her childhood in Wassenaar. Here she attended the highschool Rijnlands Lyceum.

De Jonge van Ellemeet won a Dutch scholarship to complete her secondary education at the United World College of the Adriatic in Italy between 1993 and 1995. She subsequently studied at the University of Amsterdam between 1995 and 2000, where she obtained an MA degree in history with a focus on recent and most recent history. In her final year she also studied American studies at Smith College.

== Career ==
From 2002 until 2006 she worked for the Ministry of Health, Welfare and Sport. In 2006 she started a three-year period as an adjunct director of an economical programme-agency. In 2011 she became adjunct director of the cultural company Westergasfabriek, a position she held until March 2014. At that time she became network director of the Natuur- en milieufederaties.

Between 18 November 2014 and 9 March 2015 she was the temporary replacement of Linda Voortman of GreenLeft in the House of Representatives of the Netherlands, Voortman went on maternity leave. In the parliamentary elections of 2012 Ellemeet had occupied position number nine on the GreenLeft party list. As the party conquered four seats she was not elected. Three persons higher on the list than Ellemeet (Rik Grashoff, Arjan El Fassed and Niels van den Berge) declined to take up the temporary seat of Voortman.

In the parliamentary elections of 2017, she was elected to the House of Representatives for GreenLeft. She took office on 23 March 2017.
