= Leader of GroenLinks =

Dutch political party leaders

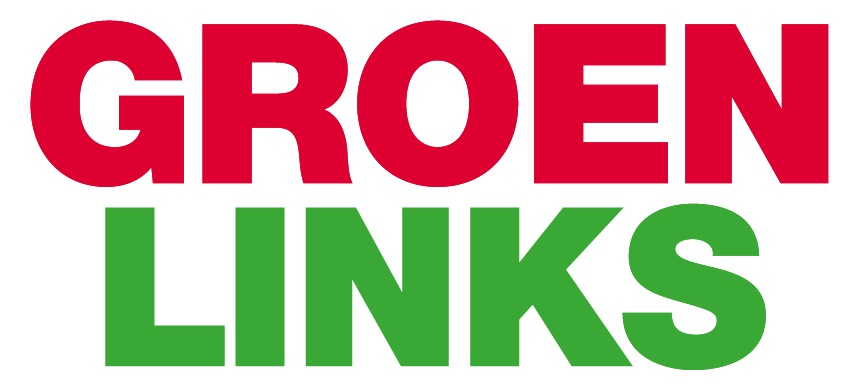
A variant logo of GroenLinks

The Leader of GroenLinks (GL, lit. 'GreenLeft') was the most senior politician within GroenLinks in the Netherlands. The post was last held by Jesse Klaver, who succeeded Bram van Ojik in 2015.

== History ==
The leaders outwardly act as the 'figurehead' and the main representative of the party. Within the party, they must ensure political consensus. At election time the leader is always the lead candidate of the party list. Outside election time the leader can serve as the opposition leader. In GroenLinks the leader is often the parliamentary leader in the House of Representatives.

Leader		Term of office	Age as leader	Position(s)	Former affiliation	Lead candidate
Ria Beckers	Ria Beckers (1938–2006)	17 June 1989 – 20 April 1993 (3 years, 307 days)	50–54	Member of the House of Representatives (1977–1993); Parliamentary leader in the House of Representatives (1977–1993)	PPR	1989
Peter Lankhorst	Peter Lankhorst (born 1947)	20 April 1993 – 5 February 1994 (291 days)	46–47	Member of the Municipal council of Amsterdam (1974–1980); Member of the House of Representatives (1981–1994); Parliamentary leader in the House of Representatives (1993–1994)	PPR	
Ina Brouwer	Ina Brouwer (born 1950)	5 February 1994 – 4 May 1994 (88 days)	43–43	Member of the House of Representatives (1981–1986, 1989–1994); Parliamentary leader in the House of Representatives (1982–1989)	CPN	1994
Paul Rosenmöller	Paul Rosenmöller (born 1956)	4 May 1994 – 15 November 2002 (8 years, 195 days)	37–46	Member of the House of Representatives (1989–2003); Parliamentary leader in the House of Representatives (1994–2002); Member of the Senate (since 2019); Parliamentary leader in the Senate (since 2019)		1998; 2002
Femke Halsema	Femke Halsema (born 1966)	15 November 2002 – 16 December 2010 (8 years, 31 days)	36–44	Member of the House of Representatives (1998–2011); Parliamentary leader in the House of Representatives (2002–2010); Mayor of Amsterdam (since 2018)	PvdA	2003; 2006; 2010
Jolande Sap	Jolande Sap (born 1963)	16 December 2010 – 5 October 2012 (1 year, 294 days)	47–49	Member of the House of Representatives (2008–2012); Parliamentary leader in the House of Representatives (2010–2012)		2012
^{[Vacant]} (5 October 2012 – 8 October 2012)
Bram van Ojik	Bram van Ojik (born 1954)	8 October 2012 – 12 May 2015 (2 years, 216 days)	58–60	Member of the House of Representatives (1993–1994, 2012–2015, 2017–2021); Ambassador-at-large for Development aid (2001–2003); Ambassador to Benin (2003–2006); Parliamentary leader in the House of Representatives (2012–2015)	PPR	
Jesse Klaver	Jesse Klaver (born 1986)	12 May 2015 – 1 July 2026 (11 years, 95 days)	29–40	Member of the Social and Economic Council (2009–2010); Member of the House of Representatives (since 2010); Parliamentary leader in the House of Representatives (2015–2023, 2023)		2017; 2021

== See also ==
- GroenLinks
