= Tara Singh Varma =

Dutch politician (1948–2026)

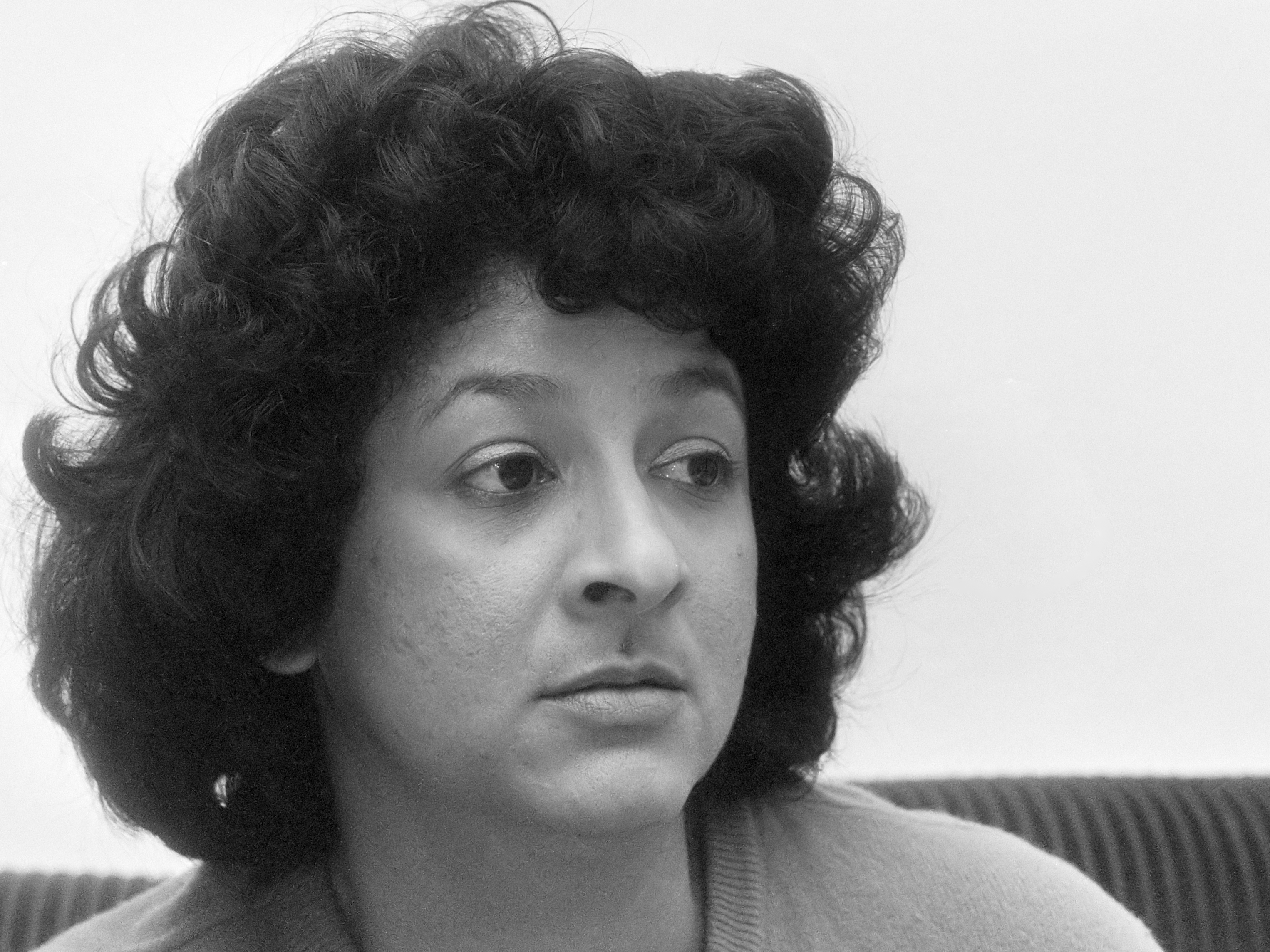
- Singh Varma in 1986

Personal details
- Born: Tarapatie Oedayraj Singh Varma; 29 August 1948 Springlands, Corriverton, British Guiana
- Died: 14 September 2026 (aged 78)
- Party: GroenLinks

Tarapatie "Tara" Oedayraj Singh Varma (29 August 1948 – 14 September 2026) was a Dutch politician and member of the House of Representatives for GroenLinks.

== Life before politics ==
Tarapatie "Tara" Singh Varma was born in British Guiana and attended vocational education in the neighboring Dutch Surinam, then a colony of the Netherlands. She studued teaching and law, without graduating. She then moved to Amsterdam, in the continental part of the Netherlands. In Amsterdam she became active for the Communist Party of the Netherlands. Between 1982 and 1994 she was member of the Amsterdam municipal council for the CPN, between 1986 and 1990 for the Left Accord, a common list of the Pacifist Socialist Party and the Political Party of Radicals, and between 1990 and 1994 for GroenLinks, which was formed by a merger of CPN, PSP, PPR, and the small Evangelical People's Party.

Singh Varma was very active in civil society. She was a member of various boards of associations and foundations for migrants, women and other social groups. She founded and led an Amsterdam information point. She had a column in the women's weekly Furore, and was a member of the radio panel of the VARA radio show Punch. She also was treasurer of the Grenada Committee.

== Political life ==
After the 1994 election, Singh Varma became a member of the House of Representatives. She succeeded Ina Brouwer, who had stepped down after the poor election results. She was the first female member of the House of Representatives born outside the Netherlands. When she entered parliament, questions were raised about her integrity. There were questions surrounding fundraising efforts for the Grenada Foundation in which Singh Varma was involved. A committee led by former minister Dieuwke de Graaff-Nauta came to the conclusion that Singh Varma had not embezzled money, but that her actions as treasurer had been neglectful. In parliament Singh Varma spoke on home affairs, health, and welfare. She paid particular attention to the position of migrant women. While in parliament she took many positions outside of parliament in boards of foundations and associations for migrants, women and other social groups. She chaired the Surinam Women's Council and was member of the board of the Volunteer Centre in Amsterdam, the migrant women centre Zami, and the prostitutes' trade union the Red Thread. In 1996 she claimed to be intimidated and attacked by far-right groups. No proof of this was ever found.

In 1997 she was put on the ninth place on the GroenLinks list for the 1998 election. The committee for candidacy stated that she "did not excel in parliamentary work," but because of the unexpectedly good election result for GroenLinks she was re-elected. She also got a large number of preference votes. In 1998 she was a member of the parliamentary inquiry committee on the crash of El Al Flight 1862 in the Bijlmermeer. This position got her national fame.

=== Singh Varma Affair ===
In 2000 Singh Varma claimed that she was less able to perform her work as Member of Parliament. Twice she appeared in the House of Representatives in a wheelchair. She claimed to suffer from an incurable form of cancer and announced that she would leave the House of Representatives to prepare for the end of her life.

In June 2001 the TROS television show Opgelicht?! (in English "Conned?!") discovered that Singh Varma did not suffer from cancer. Moreover, according to this program, Singh Varma had not fulfilled financial promises to the Indian development organization Ninash Foundation, which had put the organization into financial problems.

First Singh Varma denied both claims and sued the journalists. In August 2001 she claimed that she had not suffered from cancer and instead suffered from post-traumatic stress disorder after self-fabricated far-right threats and her commitment to the victims of the plane crash in the Bijlmermeer. In 2002 she publicly apologized for her actions. She denied lying on purpose about her diseases and stated that she suffered from delusions and a medical condition called pseudologia fantastica. Paul Rosenmöller, political leader of the GroenLinks at the time writes that he felt "cheated and angry" because of her revelations.

== Life after politics ==
After leaving parliament Singh Varma became editor of the People's Newspaper Suriname around 2005. Later she worked in a Surinam deli.

Singh Varma died on 14 September 2026, at the age of 78.
