= Kauthar Bouchallikht =

Dutch politician (born 1994)

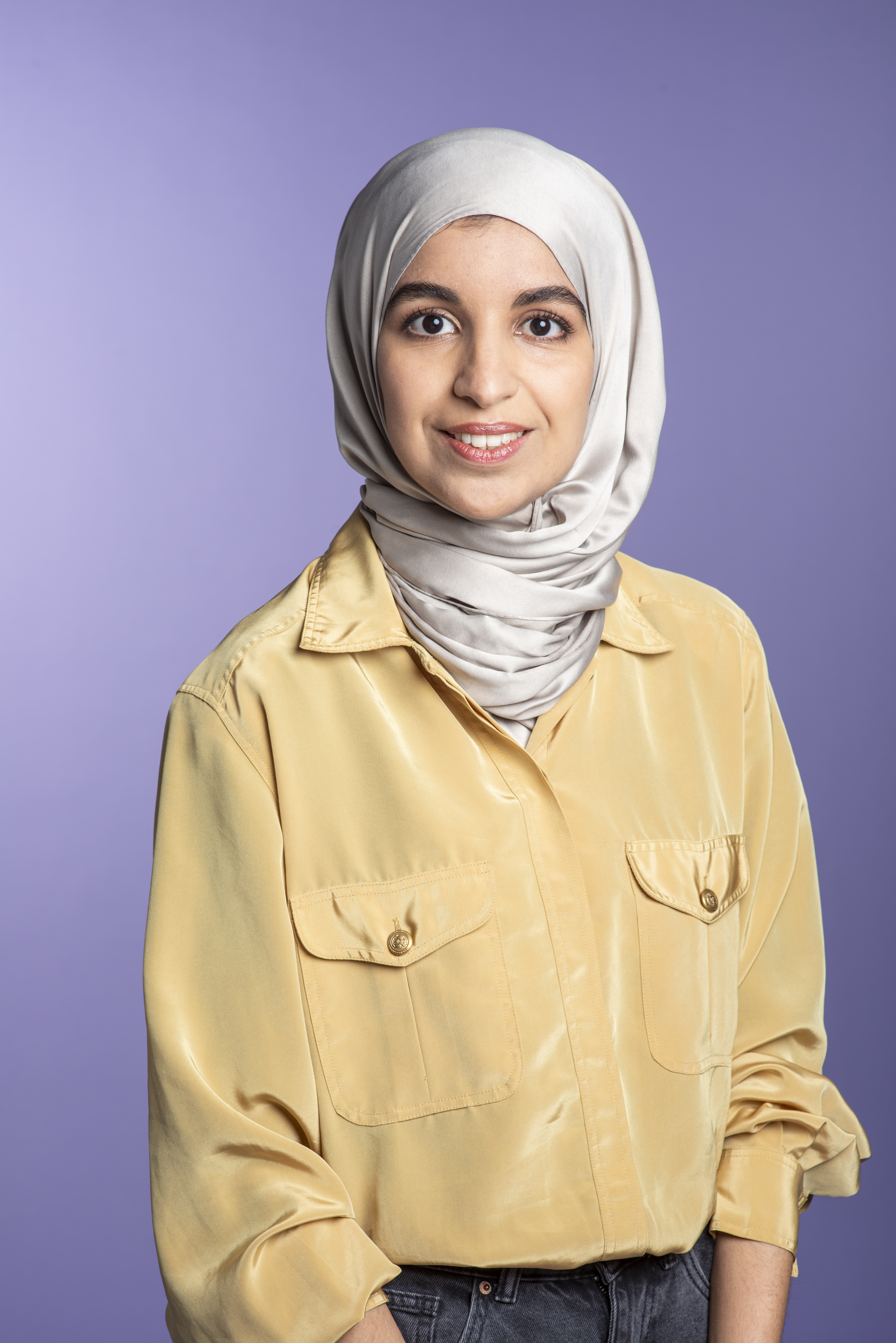

Member of the House of Representatives
- In office 31 March 2021 – 5 December 2023

Personal details
- Born: K. Bouchallikht; 16 May 1994 (age 32) Amsterdam, Netherlands
- Party: GroenLinks
- Education: Utrecht University
- Occupation: Publicist
- Website: Personal website

Kauthar Bouchallikht (Note: Some sources spell her last name as Bouchallikh.) (born 16 May 1994) is a Dutch politician, climate activist and publicist. She served as a member of the House of Representatives between 2021 and 2023 on behalf of the green political party GroenLinks. Bouchallikht was the first member of parliament in Dutch parliamentary history to wear a hijab. She is also known for her activism in the climate movement.

== Early life and career ==
Bouchallikht was born in Amsterdam in 1994 in a family of Moroccan descent and was also raised in that city. Starting in 2011, while in high school, she served on the board of LAKS, a Dutch interest group for students, and in that position helped organize a 2011 pupil strike against a mandatory minimum number of school hours. Bouchallikht studied public management at Utrecht University, where she obtained her master's degree in 2016. She also wrote some articles for the newspaper Het Parool during this period.

After completing her studies, she started working as a freelance publicist, speaker, and trainer, working for De Correspondent, online sustainability magazine OneWorld, and Nieuw Wij. She also became the chair of the foundation Groene Moslims (Green Muslims), which promotes sustainability, in January 2018. Furthermore, she served as vice-chair of the Forum for European Muslim Youth and Student Organisations (FEMYSO) until December 2020. In this position, she provided training at a camp of a Millî Görüş youth organization.

In March 2019, she assisted in an Amsterdam climate change protest. The organization for which she was a campaigner, DeGoedeZaak, was one of the organizers. A book by Bouchallikht and investigative journalist Zoë Papaikonomou called De inclusiemarathon (The inclusiveness marathon) about diversity and equality in the workplace was published in October 2021. For their book, they interviewed 41 diversity professionals. It was named Management Book of the Year in 2022.

== Politics ==
=== 2021 general election ===
In November 2020, Bouchallikht appeared in ninth place on GroenLinks's draft party list for the 2021 general election. She had not held any positions within the party before. Shortly after, author and former journalist Carel Brendel wrote on his personal blog about Bouchallikht's position at FEMYSO, which was not mentioned in her GroenLinks profile. Brendel cited allegations by Italian-American Islamist expert Lorenzo G. Vidino of ties between FEMYSO and the transnational Sunni Islamist organization Muslim Brotherhood, although the organization itself has denied this. Bouchallikht called it an allegation, denied having connections with the Muslim Brotherhood, and later denounced their ideas. Party leader Jesse Klaver defended her, calling her the figurehead of the green movement, but he also called it a bad idea to give training at Millî Görüş.

In December 2020, blog GeenStijl published a picture showing Bouchallikht at a 2014 demonstration against violence in the Gaza Strip. She was surrounded by protesters carrying antisemitic slogans. Bouchallikht reacted by saying that she denounces antisemitism and that she should have left the demonstration when those banners were shown. The blog also found out that two years earlier she had liked a Facebook post, in which Jesse Klaver was called "a villain or cowardly" for not agreeing with a statement of political party NIDA equating Israel and the Islamic State. Arab news channel Al Jazeera published an opinion piece on their website by British activist Malia Bouattia, in which she called the media reports about Bouchallikht's candidacy "racist, Islamophobic attacks". It was signed by 102 persons and organizations including numerous politicians and academics. A data leak at a public relations firm later revealed that the government of the United Arab Emirates had hired them to wage a smear campaign against the Muslim Brotherhood that included the exaggeration of claimed ties between it and FEMYSO as well as payments to Vidino.

=== House of Representatives ===
In the election, GroenLinks won eight seats. Bouchallikht was elected to the House despite her ninth position on the party list due to the 27,038 preference votes she received. She was one of three members of the new House who were elected due to meeting the preference-vote threshold. Bouchallikht was sworn in on 31 March 2021 and became the first member wearing a hijab in the history of the House of Representatives. A small group of Pegida supporters protested against her installation. Her specializations in the House were MBO, digitization, environment, circular economy, kingdom affairs, infrastructure, and water management. In early 2023, she presented a plan with the Labour Party to make public transport more affordable. They proposed an experiment to provide free public transport to lower-income individuals as well as a reversal of recent price hikes in tickets. The €400 million required for the latter would be funded through an increase in the wealth and corporate taxes. Bouchallikht said that part of the population is dependent on public transport and that it should therefore be a basic right as opposed to a way to make a profit.

When the collapse of the fourth Rutte cabinet led to a November 2023 general election, Bouchallikht was selected as the 17th candidate on the shared list of GroenLinks–PvdA. However, she announced her withdrawal from the list on 14 October due to her disappointment about the party's messaging surrounding the Gaza war. She was missing more emphasis on the background of the conflict and the 2023 Hamas-led attack on Israel that triggered it, in particular previous occupational acts by Israel. Bouchallikht did appear on the ballot, as the deadline for filing names had passed, and she received 12,879 votes. She decided to decline her seat, and her term ended on 5 December.

==== Committee memberships ====
- Committee for Agriculture, Nature and Food Quality
- Committee for Digital Affairs
- Committee for Education, Culture and Science
- Committee for Infrastructure and Water Management
- Committee for Kingdom Relations

== Personal life ==
Bouchallikht is a resident of Amsterdam.

== Electoral history ==
Electoral history of Kauthar Bouchallikht
Year	Body	Party	Pos.	Votes	Result		Ref.
Year	Body	Party	Pos.	Votes	Party seats	Individual	Ref.
2021	House of Representatives	GroenLinks	9	27,038	8	Won (Note: Bouchallikht received enough preference votes to be elected despite her party's result.)	
2023	House of Representatives	GroenLinks–PvdA	17	12,879	25	Won (Note: Bouchallikht declined her seat as announced ahead of the election.)	
