= Linda Voortman =

Dutch politician and trade unionist (born 1979)

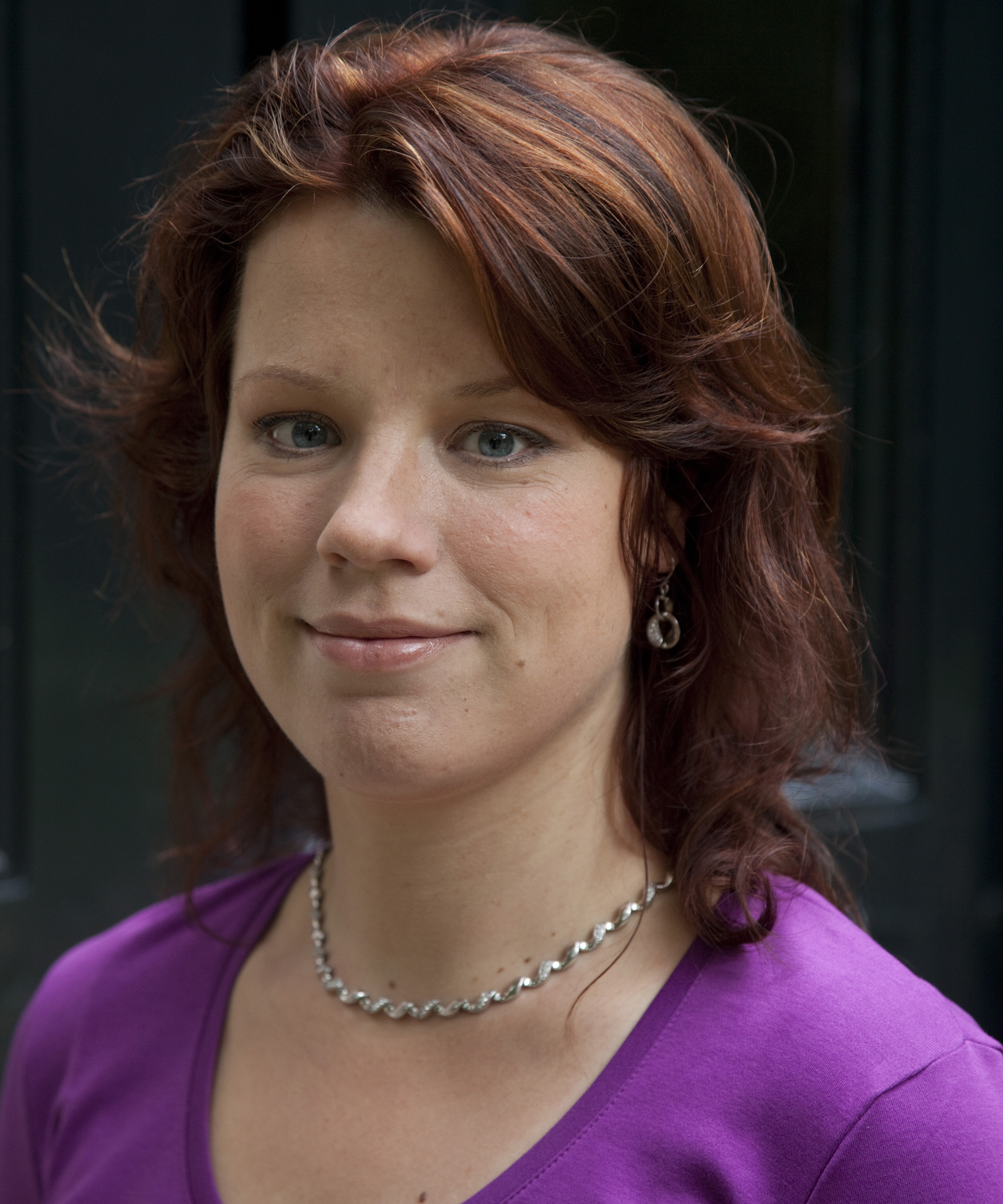

Member of the House of Representatives
- In office 9 March 2015 – 6 June 2018
- In office 30 October 2012 – 18 November 2014
- In office 17 June 2010 – 20 September 2012

Personal details
- Born: Linda Geertruida Johanna Voortman; 27 June 1979 (age 47) Enschede
- Party: GreenLeft
- Occupation: Politician

Linda Voortman (born 27 June 1979 in Enschede) is a Dutch politician and former trade unionist. Representing GreenLeft, she was a Dutch member of parliament between 2010 and 2018 with interruptions. Since 7 June 2018, she has been an alderwoman of Utrecht.

== Education ==
While studying English language and history of modern literature at the University of Groningen, Voortman participated in students' unions of her school.

== Political and unionist career ==
From 2002 to 2008 she was a member of the municipal council of the city of Groningen.

From 2008 to 2010 she was a member of the board of Allied Union, an affiliate union of the Federation Dutch Labour Movement (FNV).

For GreenLeft, Voortman was an MP from 17 June 2010 to 19 September 2012. She focused on matters of public health, welfare and housing. Voortman serves continuously as an MP since 30 October 2012. She was added to the party faction again after seat leader Jolande Sap left the House on 23 October 2012.

In June 2014 Voortman was suspended by party group leader Bram van Ojik for one month after it was thought that she disclosed confidential information about the appointment procedure for the new National Ombudsman to party colleagues. Later that year the prosecutor stated that Voortman had the full right to discuss the appointment procedure with party colleagues and that marking her as a suspect in a criminal prosecution was unwarranted.

In 2018 Voortman left the House to become an alderwoman in Utrecht, being replaced by Paul Smeulders. In 2019 her workplace diversity policies attracted national scrutiny, especially the mandatory diversity courses for all civil servants.
