= Tom van den Nieuwenhuijzen =

Dutch politician

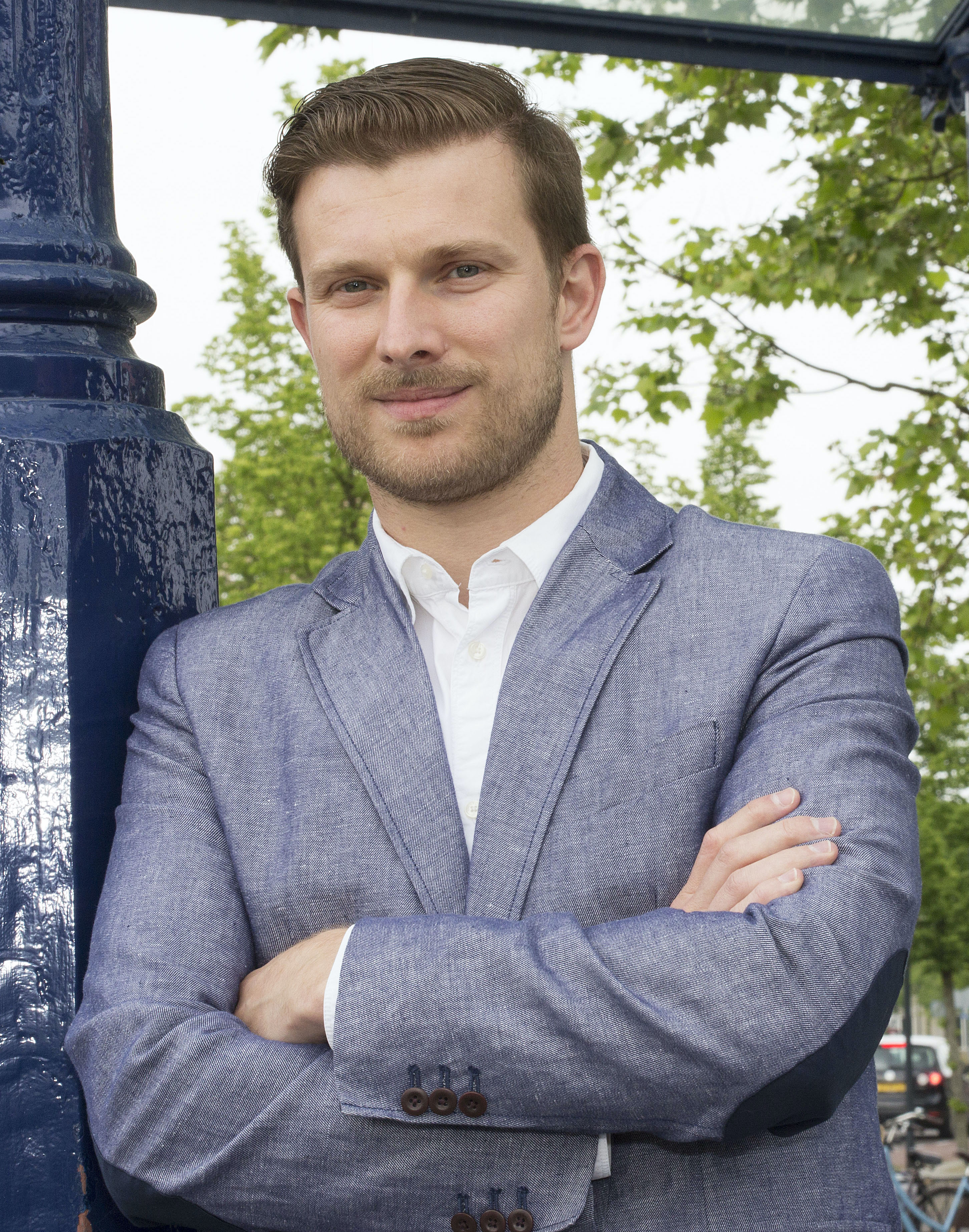
- Van den Nieuwenhuijzen in 2016

Member of the House of Representatives
- In office 7 May 2020 – 30 March 2021
- Preceded by: Isabelle Diks

Alderman in Son en Breugel
- In office 12 May 2016 – 18 January 2019
- Succeeded by: Paul van Liempd

Member of the Eindhoven municipal council
- In office 11 March 2010 – 10 May 2016
- Succeeded by: Hans van Zijl

Personal details
- Born: Tom J.H. van den Nieuwenhuijzen; 18 July 1982 (age 43) Weert, Netherlands
- Party: GroenLinks

Tom J.H. van den Nieuwenhuijzen-Wittens (born 18 July 1982) is a Dutch politician, who held a seat in the House of Representatives. He is a member of the green political party GroenLinks.

After receiving an engineering degree, Van den Nieuwenhuijzen started working in the construction sector. He served as a member of the Eindhoven municipal council between 2010 and 2016, a period during which he was named Mister Gay Netherlands. He subsequently worked as an alderman for the municipality Son en Breugel until 2019. He was appointed member of the House in 2020 and lost re-election in 2021. During his political career, Van den Nieuwenhuijzen focussed on sustainability and the acceptance of the LGBT community.

== Early life and education ==
Van den Nieuwenhuijzen was born in Weert in the Dutch province Limburg on 18 July 1982. His mother worked as a secretary, while his father was not employed due to a disability. Van den Nieuwenhuijzen attended a high school belonging to the Philips van Horne Scholengemeenschap in that city between 1994 and 1999, earning a havo diploma. Subsequently, he went to Franklin Pierce High School in the American state Washington for one year. Van den Nieuwenhuijzen studied architectural engineering at Avans University of Applied Sciences in Tilburg (2000–2005).

While having a job, Van den Nieuwenhuijzen studied business administration at Leergang Bedrijfskunde in Maastricht (2008–2010). He also received a Master of Science degree in business administration from Nyenrode Business University in 2017 after two years of study.

== Non-political career ==
While studying, Van den Nieuwenhuijzen worked as a junior youth participation policy adviser at social work organization Kuseema (2003–2005). He subsequently became a drafter at the Oisterwijk architecture firm Drijvers. He started working in 2006 at Betonson, a company producing concrete, where he held the position of sustainability and energy account manager.

Van den Nieuwenhuijzen has told that, while revalidating from a mountain bike accident, he realized that he wanted to be more socially committed. When he wanted to resign, he was offered the new position of CSR and sustainability manager at Betonson's parent company, Van Nieuwpoort Groep. He took the job and also joined GroenLinks during this time. Under his leadership, the company developed cement-free concrete, and four of its subsidiaries received a level 3 out of 5 certification on climate bureau HIER's CO_{2} achievement ladder. However, all four companies would lose this certification in 2013. Van den Nieuwenhuijzen stopped working for Van Nieuwpoort in 2012.

He taught management and sustainability at Fontys University of Applied Sciences in Tilburg between 2013 and 2018. Simultaneously, he ran a sustainability consulting and project management company called "Avengers Way". After resigning as alderman in early 2019, he was hired by the municipality Amsterdam to work as a project manager on its climate accord. He left that position when he became an MP.

== Local politics ==
=== Eindhoven municipal council (2010–2016) ===
During the 2010 municipal elections, Van den Nieuwenhuijzen was second on the party list of GroenLinks in Eindhoven. He was elected councilman with 257 votes, while his party received four out of 45 seats. He kept working at Betonson and was chosen political talent of 2010 in the Eindhoven "Council Member of the Year" election. In October 2012, it was announced that Eindhoven would host the pride parade Pink Saturday in 2014. Van den Nieuwenhuijzen had been chairing a committee since 2010 to bring the event to the city. An earlier bid for the 2013 edition had been unsuccessful. In the run-up to Pink Saturday, he announced that he had received an anonymous threat in his mailbox, saying "filthy faggot, fuck off with your illness and Pink Saturday". Van den Nieuwenhuijzen filed a criminal complaint. In 2013, he was voted Council Member of the Year.

Van den Nieuwenhuijzen was re-elected in 2014, when GroenLinks retained its four seats. He had run for GroenLinks lijsttrekker in Eindhoven, but did not win. He was also 32nd on the party list of GroenLinks in North Brabant during the 2015 provincial elections. In September of that year, he won the last edition of the beauty pageant Mister Gay Netherlands. He had before participated in the 2007 edition. Van den Nieuwenhuijzen passed the opportunity to take part in the Mr Gay World pageant because of other commitments. He became a member of a committee to choose the new mayor in early 2016. Van den Nieuwenhuijzen left the municipal council in May 2016 to become alderman.

=== Alderman (2016–2019) ===
He became alderman in Son en Breugel of, among other things, finances, culture and sustainability, on 12 May 2016 as part of a new executive board. The previous coalition had collapsed halfway through its term. In the executive board, Van den Nieuwenhuijzen represented GroenLinks as well as the Labour Party (PvdA), as both parties work together in Son en Breugel politics. Van den Nieuwenhuijzen wrote a letter in 2016 asking all Dutch municipalities to hang rainbow flags on Coming Out Day. Over 160 out of 390 of them complied compared to about 80 the previous year. He remained alderman after the 2018 municipal elections, because PvdA/GroenLinks became part of the new coalition. His responsibilities included sustainability and citizen participation. During the 2018 elections, he was also on place 28 on GroenLinks' party list in Utrecht.

Van den Nieuwenhuijzen resigned from his position in January 2019. According to a statement, he was unable to have an impact on the things in politics that mattered most to him. A number of his proposals to improve the environment had been rejected by the other coalition partners in the preceding months. His plan to decrease the sewerage charges for inhabitants who do not connect their downpipe to the sewers was passed by the municipal council a month after his resignation.

== House of Representatives (2020–2021) ==
He was on place 20 on GroenLinks' party list during the 2017 general election, receiving 1,413 preferential votes. His party won 14 seats, not enough for Van den Nieuwenhuijzen to be elected. When MP Isabelle Diks vacated her seat to take a job as alderwoman in Groningen, he was chosen to succeed her because of his position on the party list. Van den Nieuwenhuijzen was inaugurated on 7 May 2020. His portfolio included development aid and defense. In the House, he proposed naming frigates after women and assisting textile companies that want to leave China due to forced labor by Uyghurs.

He appeared as the 22nd candidate on the party list for the 2021 general election but lost his bid for re-election. His party won eight seats, and Van den Nieuwenhuijzen's 1,394 votes were not enough to meet the preference-vote threshold.

=== Parliamentary committees ===
- Committee for Foreign Affairs
- Committee for Defense
- Committee for Foreign Trade and Development Cooperation
- Delegation to the NATO Parliamentary Assembly
- Construction Supervision Committee

== Post-political career ==
Van den Nieuwenhuijzen worked as a sustainability director at Capgemini Invent after his political career. Besides, he appeared again on Utrecht's party list in the 2022 municipal elections as GroenLinks' 38th candidate.

== Other interests ==
Between 2011 and 2014, Van den Nieuwenhuijzen was on the advisory board of theater company "Het Nieuwe Theater". He also chaired the non-profit CSR organization "De MVO-Wijzer", that assists small and medium-sized enterprises, from 2013 to 2014.

== Personal life ==
Van den Nieuwenhuijzen is openly gay, and he is in a relationship with two other men. He got married with one of them in 2008, and the other one joined them ten years later. He lived in the city Utrecht when he was an MP, and he has also been a resident of Eindhoven.

In 2008, he crashed into a tree while on his mountain bike. His rehabilitation took seven months, and he had to take a leave of absence from the Eindhoven municipal council in 2015 due to complications from the accident.
