= Marleen Haage =

Dutch politician (born 1980)

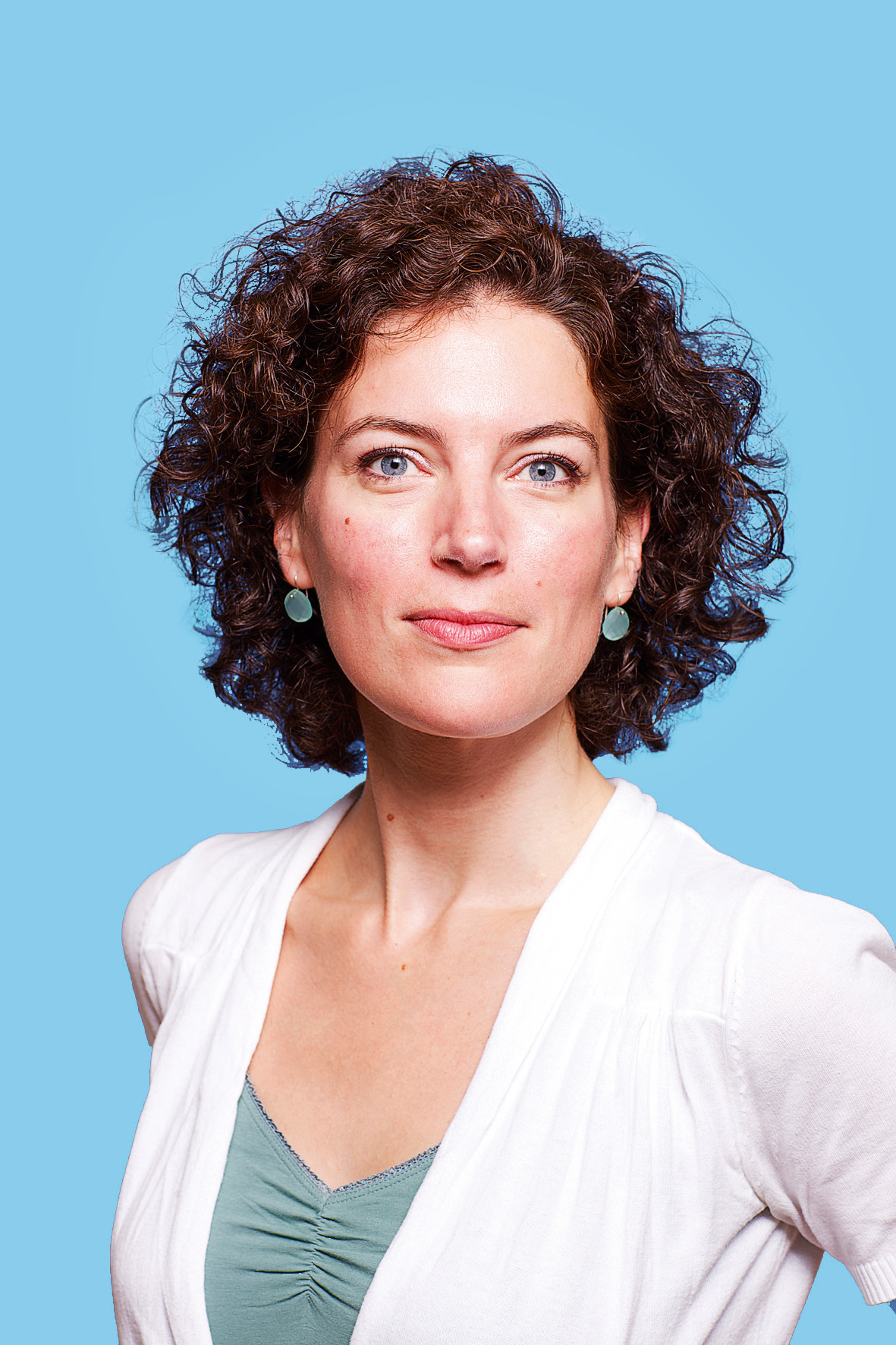
- Haage in 2011

Member of the House of Representatives
- In office 18 December 2024 – 11 November 2025
- Preceded by: Senna Maatoug
- Parliamentary group: GroenLinks–PvdA

Member of the Utrecht Municipal Council
- In office 11 March 2010 – 1 June 2017
- Succeeded by: Ruben Post

Personal details
- Born: 26 April 1980 (age 46) Bennekom, Netherlands
- Party: Labour Party
- Education: Utrecht University
- Occupation: Politician; police administrator; educator

Marleen W. Haage (born 26 April 1980) is a Dutch politician who served as a member of the House of Representatives for GroenLinks–PvdA between December 2024 and November 2025. A police administrator and public safety educator, she was on the Utrecht Municipal Council for the Labour Party (PvdA) from 2010 to 2018.

== Early life and education ==
Haage was born in the village of Bennekom and grew up in Arnhem. Her father was a civil servant and her mother a school social worker. One of her grandfathers was a police officer.

After graduating from the atheneum of the Thorbecke Scholengemeenschap, she moved to Utrecht to study general social science at Utrecht University in 1999, having also considered applying for a job with the police instead. During her studies, Haage was a member of student association Unitas S.R. and the youth wing of the Labour Party, the Young Socialists, where she was on the national board at the time of the assassination of Pim Fortuyn in 2002. She worked as a staffer for member of parliament Staf Depla for 2.5 years, and she completed her studies in 2006.

== Career ==
Haage started her career as a project leader for the Utrecht police department before moving to a public safety consultancy firm in 2008. She started working as an integrated safety teacher at HU University of Applied Sciences Utrecht three years later. Haage was elected the Utrecht Municipal Council in March 2010 as the Labour Party's third candidate. She was re-elected in March 2014, and she became her party's parliamentary leader. She left the council and HU in June 2017 to work as an adviser for the National Police Corps. She later advised the police's Rotterdam unit, and she became its sector head in 2020.

Haage ran for the House of Representatives in November 2023 as the 26th candidate on the shared GroenLinks–PvdA list. She was not elected, as the party won 25 seats. On 18 December 2024, she was sworn in as member of parliament following the resignation of Senna Maatoug. Haage's portfolio included pensions, child care, and the aftermath of the childcare benefits scandal. She was not re-elected in October 2025, and her term ended on 11 November.

=== House committee assignments ===
- Committee for Finance
- Committee for Social Affairs and Employment
- Public Expenditure committee

== Personal life ==
Haage moved to Rotterdam in 2017 to live with her partner and his child. She lived in Rotterdam-Zuid in 2023, but she had moved to Maarn, Utrecht by 2024.

== Electoral history ==
Electoral history of Willem Koops
Year	Body	Party	Pos.	Votes	Result		Ref.
Year	Body	Party	Pos.	Votes	Party seats	Individual	Ref.
2010	Utrecht Municipal Council	Labour Party	3	819	9	Won	
2012	House of Representatives	Labour Party	60	548	38	Lost	
2014	Utrecht Municipal Council	Labour Party	4	1,057	5	Won	
2023	House of Representatives	GroenLinks–PvdA	26	16,764	25	Lost (Note: Haage was appointed to the body later during the term due to a vacancy.)	
2025	House of Representatives	GroenLinks–PvdA	29	3,802	20	Lost	
