= Paul Smeulders =

Dutch politician (born 1987)

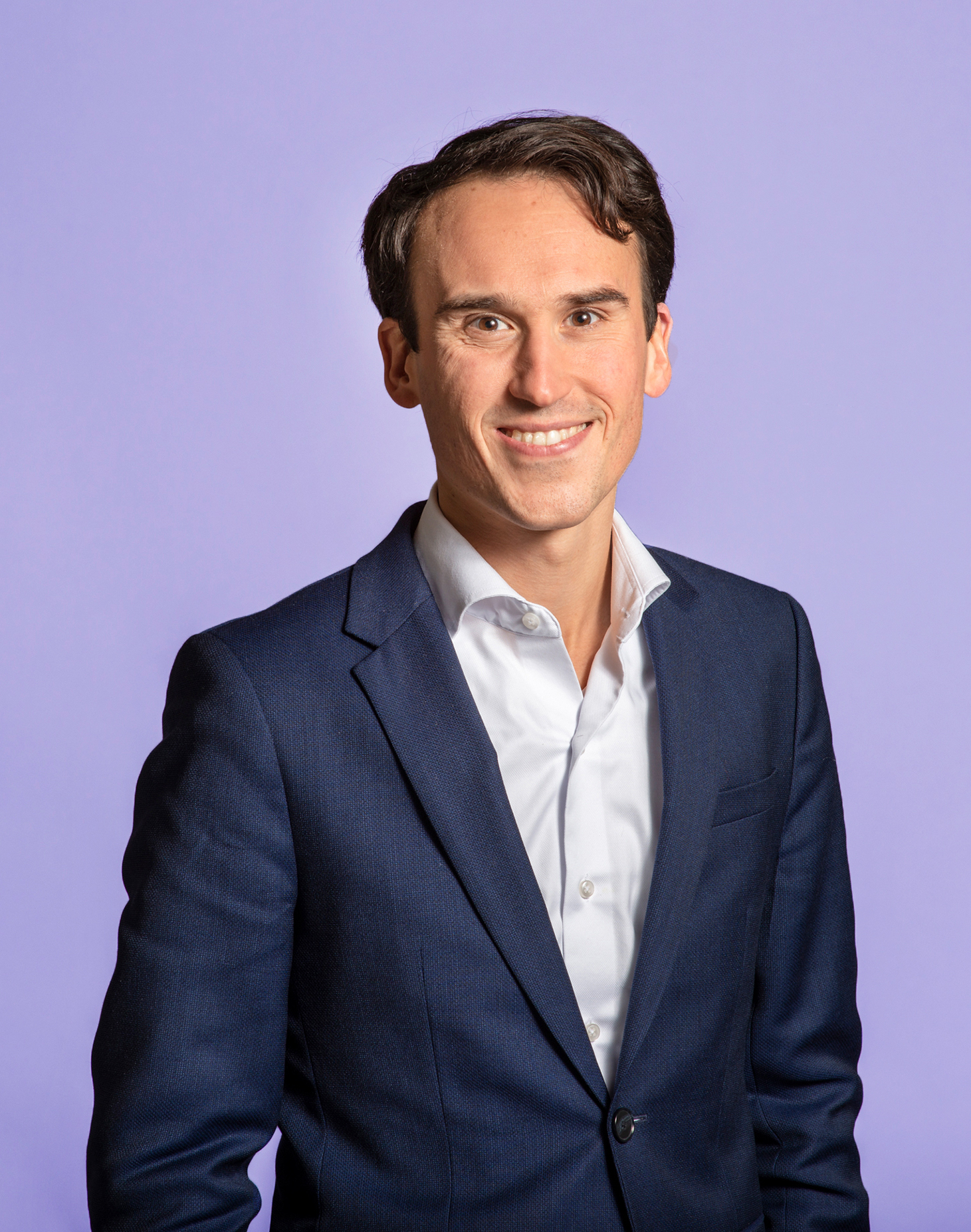
- Smeulders in 2020

Member of the House of Representatives
- In office 6 June 2018 – 30 March 2021
- Preceded by: Linda Voortman

Alderman of Arnhem
- Incumbent
- Assumed office 2022

Alderman of Helmond
- In office 2014–2018

Member of the Provincial Council of North Brabant
- In office 2011–2014

Personal details
- Born: Paul Smeulders; 15 July 1987 (age 39) Helmond, Netherlands
- Party: GroenLinks
- Education: Avans University of Applied Sciences; Tilburg University
- Occupation: Politician

Paul Smeulders (Dutch pronunciation: [pʌul ˈsmøːldərs]; born 15 July 1987) is a Dutch politician of GroenLinks.

== Education and career ==
Born in Helmond, Smeulders studied public administration successively at the Avans University of Applied Sciences and Tilburg University between 2004 and 2010. He worked as a public affairs adviser at Vereniging Natuurmonumenten, and he became a member of the Provincial Council of North Brabant in 2011, serving as GroenLinks's parliamentary leader. Smeulders left the council in 2014 to become alderman for finances, sustainability, and land in Helmond.

He did not secure a seat in the House of Representatives in the 2017 general election, but he was appointed to the body in June 2018 to succeed Linda Voortman. Smeulders lost his bid for re-election in 2021, bringing his membership of the House to an end on 30 March. He was appointed alderman for finances, housing, and refugees in Arnhem the following year after having formed the municipality's executive as (in)formateur. He announced in 2024 that Arnhem would house 1,700 asylum seekers for the next 30 years – 980 more than required by the national government – and he signaled that refugees were welcome.
