= FEMYSO =

European Muslim student organization

The Forum of European Muslim Youth and Student Organisations (FEMYSO) is a pan-European Islamic organisation based in Brussels, Belgium, representing 32 Muslim youth organisations across 22 European countries. FEMYSO is a member of the European Students' Union, which considers it the de facto voice of Muslim youth in Europe. It has been accused of having links with the Muslim Brotherhood.

== Controversies ==
=== Closeness to the Muslim Brotherhood ===
FEMYSO has been accused of being linked with the Muslim Brotherhood and of being one of its main relays in Europe. One of the organisation's former leaders is Intissar Kherigi, the daughter of Rached Ghannouchi, who headed the Tunisian Islamist Ennahdha party (inspired by the Muslim Brotherhood). While holding responsibilities within FEMYSO, Kherigi participated in 2011 in the preparation of a joint report with the Council of Europe entitled: "Combating Islamophobia through Intercultural and Interreligious Work". This document also included a statement by the Swiss theologian and grandson of the founder of the Muslim Brotherhood, Tariq Ramadan.

FEMYSO has strongly denied any such links, with its president, Hania Chalal, responding that "FEMYSO is not associated, either structurally or ideologically, with any association". In 2023, it was revealed that a campaign, commissioned and financed by the United Arab Emirates, was orchestrated by a Swiss company named "Alp Services" specialising in "dark PR", damaging and often destroying the reputation of hundreds of prominent European Muslims by spreading baseless rumours.

In May 2025, FEMYSO was mentioned in a French intelligence report on the influence of the Muslim Brotherhood in the country, entitled "Muslim Brotherhood and Political Islamism in France". According to this report, FEMYSO is the "youth branch of the Council of European Muslims (CEM)" and acts as a "training structure for high-potential executives of the movement, in which French activists are very active". The report also accused FEMYSO of "seeking to present itself as a moderate player with recognised expertise on Islamophobia and religious freedoms" while "promoting to MPs an evolution of freedom of religion, including tougher legislation on blasphemy" and by "opposing the appointment of a European Commissioner for European values, in charge of migration".

=== Promotion of the wearing of the hijab ===
In 2021, FEMYSO launched a campaign encouraging the wearing of the hijab, which included slogans such as "Beauty is in diversity as freedom is in hijab" and "Joy in the hijab". The campaign, managed by the Council of Europe and co-funded by the European Commission, was widely criticised in the French political class, leading to its removal from Twitter and from the Council of Europe's website.
