= Ina Brouwer =

Dutch politician (born 1950)

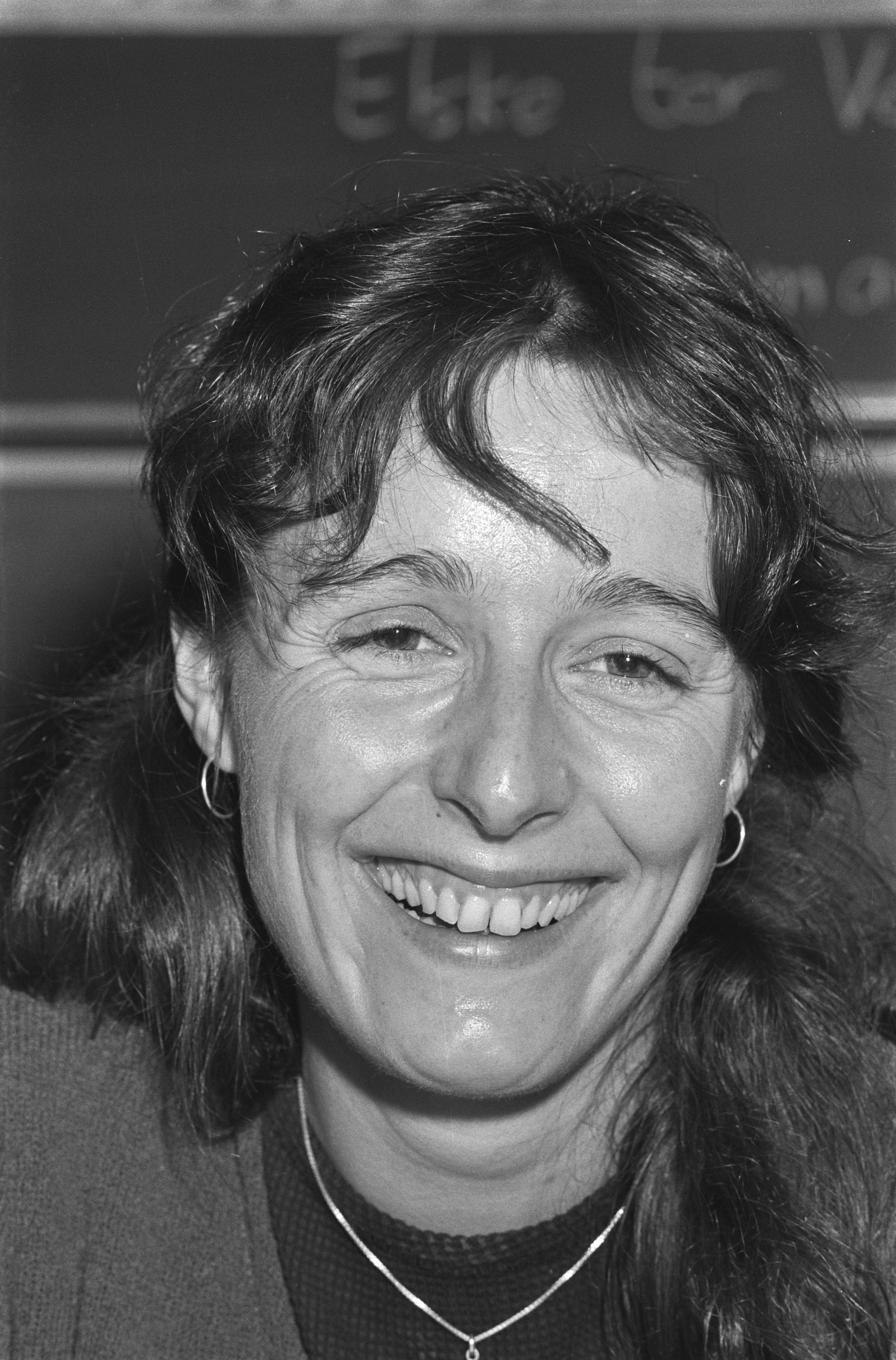
- Brouwer in 1981

Chairwoman of GroenLinks
- In office 19 May 1998 – 10 February 1999; Ad interim
- Preceded by: Ab Harrewijn
- Succeeded by: Mirjam de Rijk

Leader of GroenLinks
- In office 22 February 1994 – 4 May 1994
- Preceded by: Peter Lankhorst
- Succeeded by: Paul Rosenmöller

Leader of the Communist Party of the Netherlands
- In office 9 September 1982 – 14 September 1989
- Preceded by: Marcus Bakker
- Succeeded by: Office discontinued

Chairwoman of the Communist Party of the Netherlands
- In office 9 September 1982 – 14 September 1989
- Preceded by: Marcus Bakker
- Succeeded by: Office discontinued

Parliamentary leader in the House of Representatives
- In office 9 September 1982 – 3 June 1986
- Preceded by: Marcus Bakker
- Succeeded by: Office discontinued

Member of the House of Representatives
- In office 14 September 1989 – 17 May 1994
- In office 10 June 1981 – 3 June 1986

Personal details
- Born: Ina Brouwer; 11 April 1950 (age 76) Rotterdam, Netherlands
- Party: Labour Party (from 2007)
- Other political affiliations: GroenLinks (from 1989); Communist Party of the Netherlands (1973–1989)
- Education: University of Groningen (Bachelor of Laws, Master of Laws)
- Occupation: Politician · Civil servant · Jurist · Lawyer · Political consultant · Trade association executive · Nonprofit director · Teacher · Author · Activist

Ina Brouwer (born 11 April 1950) is a Dutch politician and lawyer who is a co-founder of the GroenLinks (GL) party. She was previously leader of the Communist Party of the Netherlands (CPN) from 1982 to 1989.

== Education and early career ==
Brouwer studied Law at Groningen University. There, Brouwer came in touch with social security law and socially engaged lawyers. Inspired by this side of the legal profession, Brouwer became a member of the Communist Party of the Netherlands. In 1981, she became a member of the House of Representatives for the CPN. In 1981, she succeeded Marcus Bakker as chairperson of the CPN parliamentary party. She remained in the House of Representatives until 1986, when the CPN lost its three seats in the election and disappeared from the House.

Brouwer was a longtime advocate of a merger of the CPN, the Christian left Political Party of Radicals and Evangelical People's Party and the leftwing socialist Pacifist Socialist Party to form a new left-wing formation. In 1989 this was realized, and the new party was called GroenLinks. After the 1989 elections Brouwer returned to the House of Representatives, as a member of parliament for GroenLinks. Between 1990 and 1991, Brouwer was one of the first members of parliament to leave the House of Representatives for a short period to give birth. The duo Ina Brouwer/Mohammed Rabbae were the top candidate for the 1994 elections after winning a preliminary from Paul Rosenmöller/Leonie Sipkes. Brouwer and Rabbae were not very successful in the general elections and the party lost one of its six seats. Brouwer announced that she would step down and not take her seat in parliament.

Between 1995 and 2003, Brouwer worked at the Ministry of Social Affairs and Employment as director for emancipation and a quartermaster for the Academy of the ministry. In 2003, she published a book, Het glazen plafond. Vrouwen aan de top, verlangens & obstakels ("The Glass ceiling. Women at the top, desires, and obstacles") on the position of women on the labour market. In 2005 Brouwer became a senior advisor at Twynstra Gudde, where she advises public institutions on diversity, social affairs and government reform.

In January 2007, Ina Brouwer announced that she became a member of the Dutch Labour Party in addition to her membership of GroenLinks. She did this in protest against GroenLinks' decision to abandon negotiations with the Labour Party, the Christian Democratic Appeal, and the Christian Union during the cabinet formation. Brouwer thought that this was a missed opportunity.

During the 2014 Dutch municipal elections, Brouwer participated as the leader of the local Amsterdam party Visie op Amsterdam. A seat was not won: the party received only 0.19 percent of the vote. Since May 2015, Brouwer has mainly continued her career as a lawyer.

In 2023, after the fall of the fourth Rutte cabinet, she presented herself as a candidate for the House of Representatives with the combined GroenLinks–Labour Party alliance.

Party political offices
Preceded by Marcus Bakker	Lijsttrekker of the Communist Party of the Netherlands; 1982, 1986	Party merged into GroenLinks
Preceded by Marcus Bakker	Leader of the Communist; Party of the Netherlands; 1982–1989	Party merged into GroenLinks
Preceded by Marcus Bakker	Chairwoman of the Communist; Party of the Netherlands; 1982–1989	Party merged into GroenLinks
Preceded by Marcus Bakker	Parliamentary leader of the Communist Party of the Netherlands in the House of Representatives; 1982–1986	Party merged into GroenLinks
Preceded by Ria Beckers	Lijsttrekker of GroenLinks; 1994	Succeeded by Paul Rosenmöller
Preceded by Peter Lankhorst	Leader of GroenLinks; 1994	Succeeded by Paul Rosenmöller
Preceded by Ab Harrewijn	Chairwoman of GroenLinks; Ad interim 1998–1999	Succeeded by Mirjam de Rijk
Non-profit organization positions
Unknown	Chairwoman of the Netherlands Social Work Association; 2008–2011	Unknown
