= Senna Maatoug =

Dutch politician

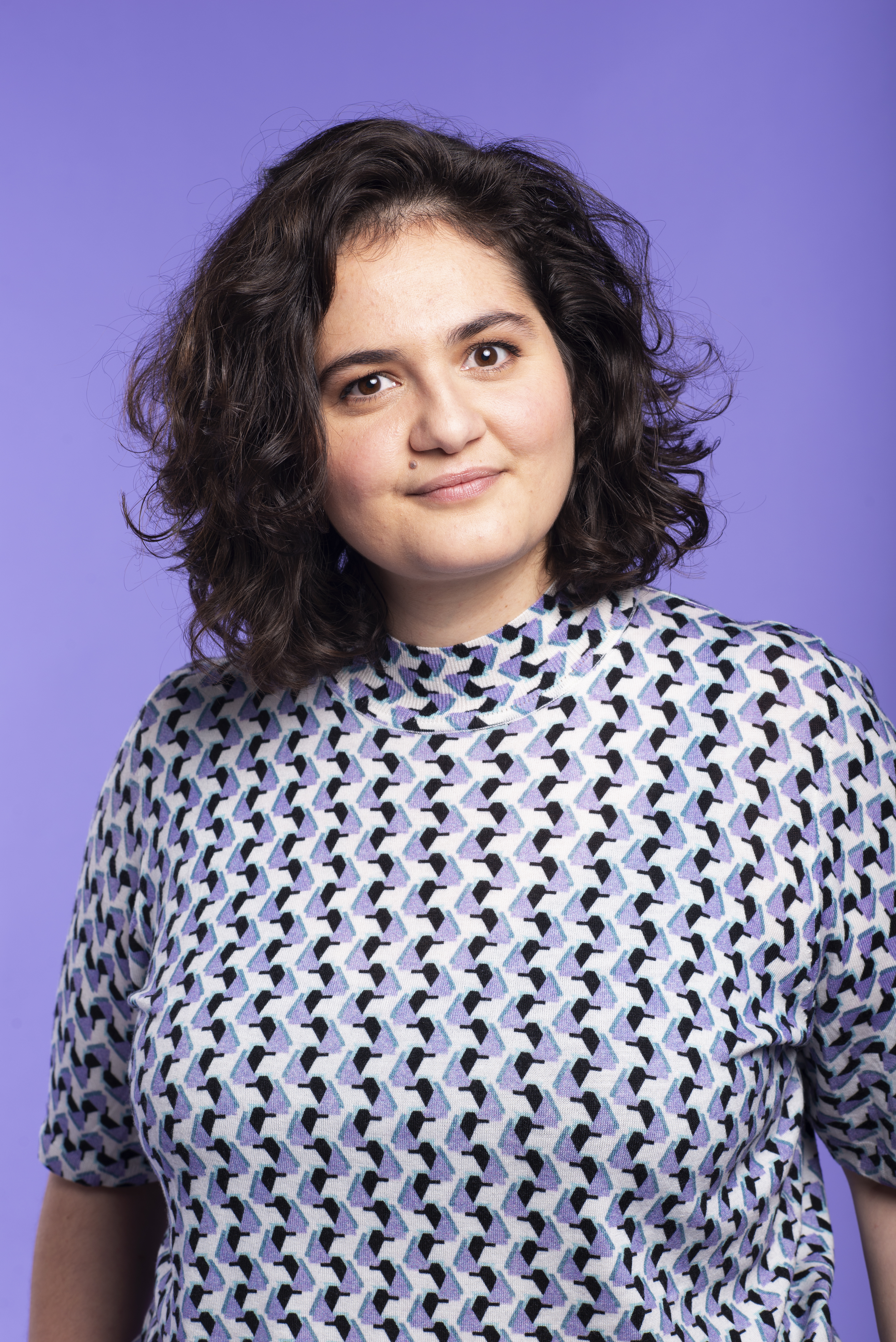
- Maatoug in 2020

Member of the House of Representatives
- In office 31 March 2021 – 17 December 2024
- Succeeded by: Marleen Haage

Alderwoman in Utrecht
- Incumbent
- Assumed office 12 December 2024
- Preceded by: Lot van Hooijdonk

Personal details
- Born: 19 August 1989 (age 37) Leiden, Netherlands
- Party: GroenLinks
- Education: Leiden University; Utrecht University
- Occupation: Politician; civil servant
- Website: sennamaatoug.nl

Senna Maatoug (born 19 August 1989) is a Dutch civil servant and politician of the green political party GroenLinks. As of December 2024, she is alderwoman in Utrecht. Before, she was a member of the House of Representatives from 2021 until 2024.

== Education and government career ==
She studied political science at Leiden University and economics at Utrecht University until 2013, when she obtained a master's and research master's degree. During her study, she also worked at the newspaper Leidsch Dagblad and reached the final of the 2013 World Universities Debating Championship in the category English as a Second Language.

Before becoming a member of parliament, Maatoug worked at the Social and Economic Council, at the Ministry of Social Affairs and Employment, and as an economist at the Ministry of Finance. Besides her job, she taught economics at Leiden University. Maautoug also served on the board of the Druckerfonds, a foundation that financially supports social and cultural initiatives in and around Leiden, between 2018 and 2021, and she is co-founder and co-chair of Het Collectief, a local organization organizing policy discussions.

== House of Representatives ==
She was placed fifth on the party list of GroenLinks in the 2021 general election. During the campaign, Maatoug argued that the number of temporary employment contracts had gotten out of control. She was elected to the House with 19,392 preference votes. Maatoug's portfolio included social affairs, employment, pensions, integration, and child care.

Together with Labour Party member of parliament Henk Nijboer, she wrote an alternative budget proposal with more spending on health care, education, and welfare, with higher corporate and capital taxes, and with a lower budget deficit compared to the coalition's budget. Furthermore, in reaction to widespread remote working during the COVID-19 pandemic to contain the virus, Maatoug and Steven van Weyenberg (D66) introduced a bill to prohibit companies from denying an employee's request to work from home or from the office without proper reasoning. The Wall Street Journal reported that it would make the Netherlands among the first countries with a right to work from home. The bill – called "Werken waar je wilt" (Working wherever you want) and an amendment to the Flexible Working Act of 2015 – was passed by the House in July 2022. Maatoug said that it would improve employee's work–life balance and that it would lead to lower commuting times. However, the bill was rejected by the Senate in September 2023 in a 37–38 vote. Maatoug also continued a 2020 bill by Wim-Jan Renkema (GroenLinks) – who had left the House – to require companies to have a confidant. It was passed by the House in May 2023 with opposition from the coalition party VVD despite cabinet approval. The CDA supported the bill only after filing an amendment to initially exclude business with fewer than 10 employees. That same year, the House carried an amendment co-filed by Maatoug to shorten the term for personal debt restructuring from three to one and a half years.

Maatoug was re-elected in November 2023 on the shared GroenLinks–PvdA list, and her specialties changed to taxation and childcare. She criticized the Schoof cabinet's 2025 budget, arguing that labor was taxed too heavily in comparison to capital. She called it the result of a combination of strict budgeting and placating the interests of corporations and the wealthy.

=== Committee assignments ===
==== 2021–2023 term ====
- Committee for Finance
- Committee for Social Affairs and Employment
- Public Expenditure committee
- Contact group United States
- Parliamentary Inquiry into Fraud Policy and Public Service

==== 2023–2024 term ====
- Contact group United States (vice chair)
- Public Expenditure committee
- Committee for Finance
- Committee for Social Affairs and Employment
- Committee for Housing and Spatial Planning

== Alderwoman of Utrecht ==
Maatoug succeeded Lot van Hooijdonk as alderwoman in Utrecht on 12 December 2024, overseeing mobility, climate, and energy. She left the House five days later.

== Personal life ==
Maatoug was born and raised in the South Holland city Leiden and still lives there as of 2024. Her grandparents moved to the Netherlands from Morocco.

== Electoral history ==
Electoral history of Senna Maatoug
Year	Body	Party	Pos.	Votes	Result		Ref.
Year	Body	Party	Pos.	Votes	Party seats	Individual	Ref.
2021	House of Representatives	GroenLinks	5	19,392	8	Won	
2023	House of Representatives	GroenLinks	13	11,323	25	Won	
