= Niels van den Berge =

Dutch politician (born 1984)

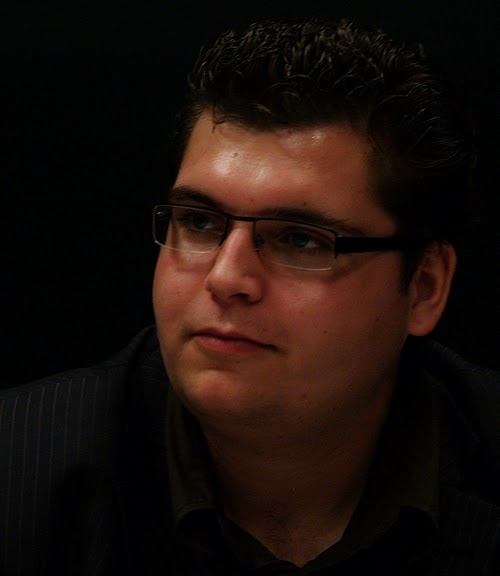
Niels van den Berge

Cornelis Niels van den Berge (born 28 December 1984 in Bad Honnef) is a Dutch politician. As a member of GreenLeft (GroenLinks) he was a temporary MP from 12 January to 11 March 2011, replacing Mariko Peters, who was on maternity leave. He focused on matters of the Dutch defense, the European Union, nature and agriculture. On 5 June 2019 he returned as an MP after Zihni Özdil resigned, focusing on integration, science, police and justice.

Van den Berge grew up in Tholen and studied law at Radboud University Nijmegen and forest and nature conservation at Wageningen University, but finished neither of them. He was a member of the municipal council of Wageningen from 2004 to 2007.
