= Zihni Özdil =

Dutch former politician

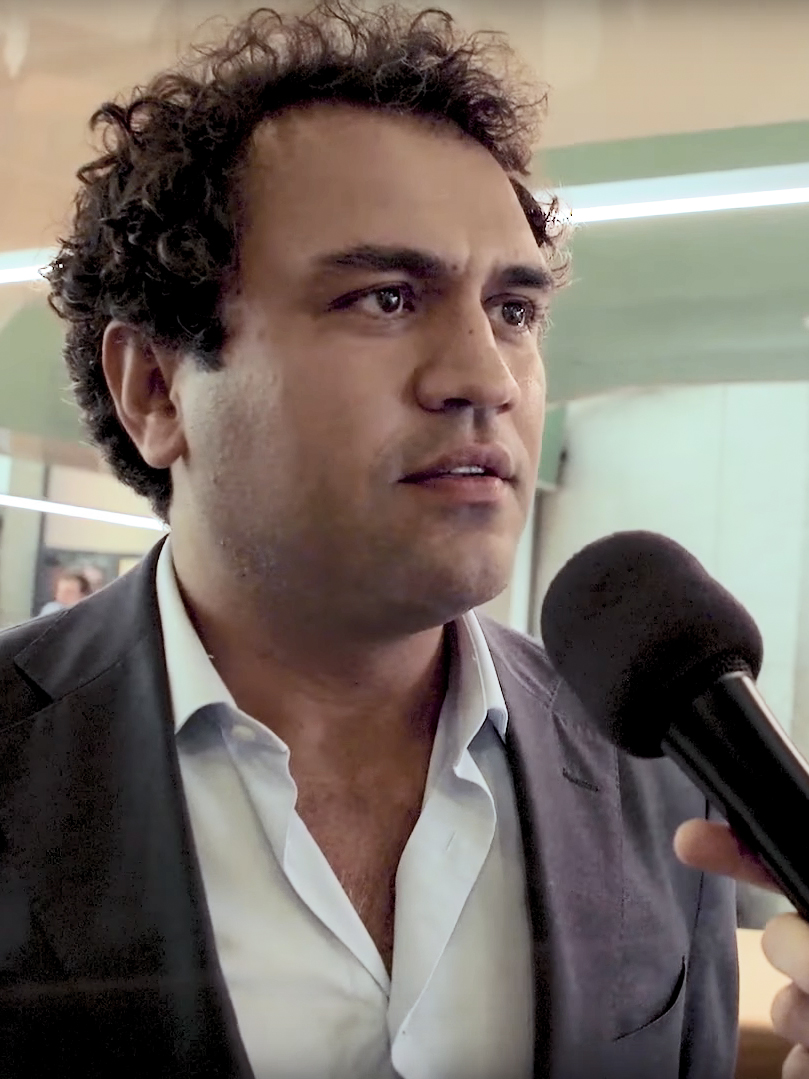
- Zihni Özdil in 2018

Member of the House of Representatives
- In office 23 March 2017 – 5 June 2019

Personal details
- Born: 8 September 1981 (age 45) Kozaklı, Turkey
- Party: GroenLinks (until 2020)
- Education: Erasmus University Rotterdam; Central Michigan University

Zihni Özdil (born 8 September 1981) is a Dutch historian and former politician. From 2017 to 2019, he served as a member of the Dutch House of Representatives for GroenLinks, resigning following conflicts with party leadership.

== Early life and career ==
Özdil is of Turkish descent and came to the Netherlands when he was two years old, his grandfather already living there. He grew up in Rotterdam. Özdil studied history at Erasmus University Rotterdam. He worked as an editor for the magazine Roest between 2006 and 2007. In the first half of 2008 he conducted research into the history of migration to America at Central Michigan University.

After returning to the Netherlands, he was a program manager at the Turkije Instituut and held debates for De Unie/Confetti. In 2009, he began research into the history of American identity. From 2010, he was a lecturer in Global History at Erasmus University Rotterdam until joining the House of Representatives in 2017. From September 2016 to January 2017 he was a lecturer at the Amsterdam University College of the University of Amsterdam.

From November 2014 to March 2017 he was a columnist for NRC Handelsblad. He advocated expanding freedom of speech in the Netherlands along the lines of the American First Amendment, speaking up in his columns for the freedom of expression of both PEGIDA, as well as islamist 'hate imams'.

He also regularly acted as a discussion leader on his YouTube channel, and also gave advice and lectures to institutions such as the Dutch Ministry of Justice, the University of Chicago, the University of Oxford and the Stedelijk Museum. From February 2016 to January 2017, Özdil was also a board member for the Self-Employed at the Dutch Association of Journalists.

== Political career ==
Özdil was elected as a member of the Dutch House of Representatives in the 2017 Dutch general election. He was number 8 on the GroenLinks candidate list. He was installed as a Member of Parliament on March 23, 2017.

In parliament, Özdil was concerned with, among other things, employment and (higher) education. In October 2018, Özdil proposed giving Middelbaar Beroepsonderwijs (MBO) students a title when they graduate, as is already customary at Dutch universities. In an interview with Trouw on May 11, 2019, he spoke out against the social loan system for students previously supported by GroenLinks. Although his party supported that position, he was blamed for taking an overly solistic approach. On May 28, 2019, Klaver announced that there had been an "irreparable breach of trust between Zihni and the parliamentary group", after which Özdil announced that he would give up his seat in Parliament, resigning on June 4, 2019. Özdil canceled his membership of GroenLinks in December 2020 due to the affair surrounding Kauthar Bouchallikht's candidacy for the House of Representatives.

== Later life ==
Following his resignation, Özdil accused the GroenLinks leadership of committing 'character assassination' against him. Former colleagues from the GroenLinks faction subsequently stated that the stress became too much for Özdil, accusing him of being often inaccessible, unreliable, not keeping his appointments, and drinking during working hours.

After his political career, Özdil continued as an opinion maker. He wrote columns for NRC from 2019 to 2020. He also wrote columns for Vrij Nederland between 2019 and 2020. In 2021, Özdil joined Elsevier Weekblad as a columnist.
