= Mariko Peters =

Dutch politician and lawyer

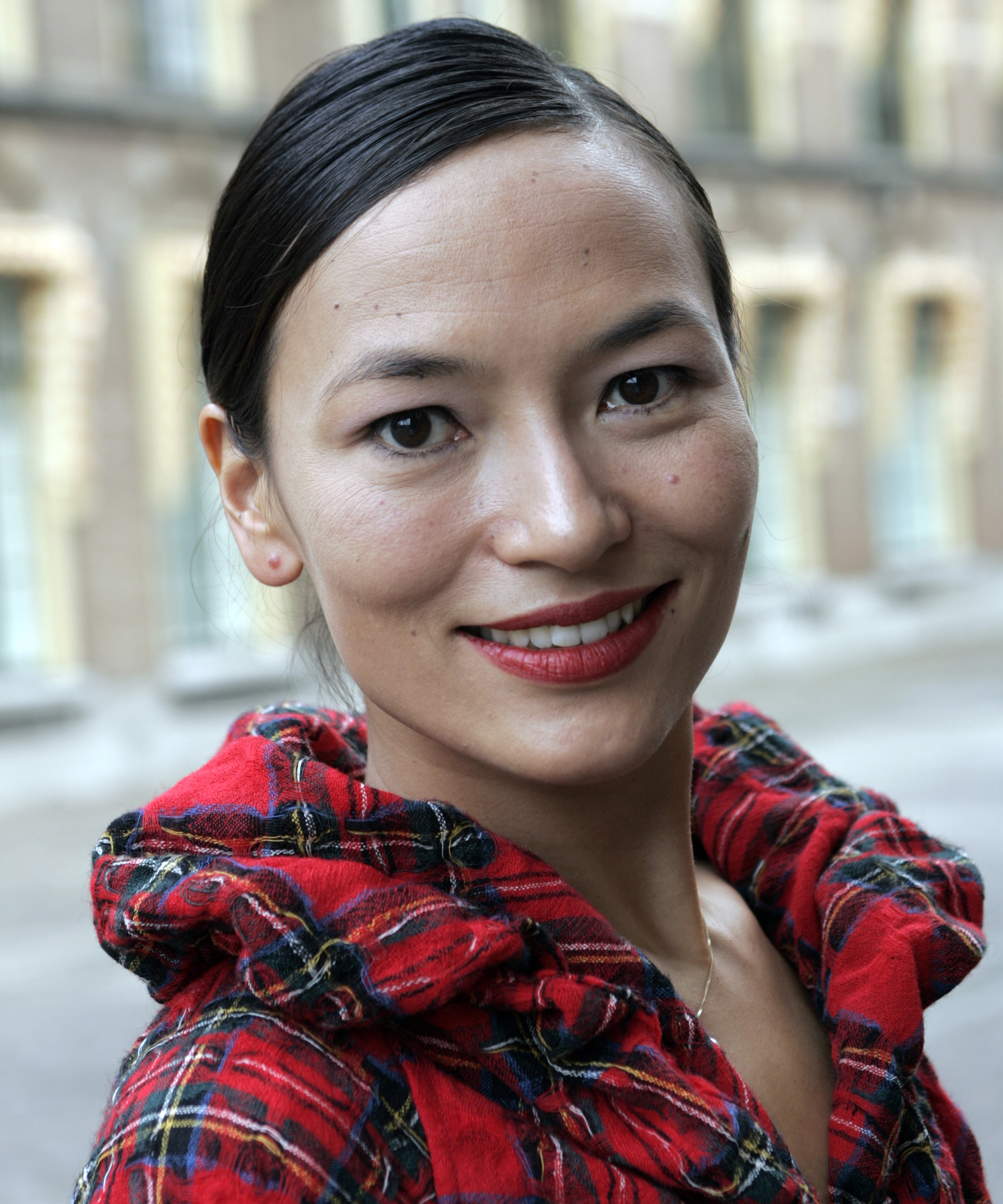

Member of the House of Representatives of the Netherlands
- In office March 11, 2011 – September 19, 2012
- Preceded by: Niels van den Berge
- In office December 21, 2008 – November 23, 2010
- Preceded by: Isabelle Diks
- Succeeded by: Rik Grashoff
- In office November 30, 2006 – August 31, 2008
- Succeeded by: Isabelle Diks

Personal details
- Born: Mariko Peters; April 22, 1969 (age 57) Berkeley, California, United States
- Party: GreenLeft (GroenLinks - GL)
- Relations: Married
- Education: Leiden University, Columbia University (LLM)
- Occupation: Politician, civil servant, lawyer
- Website: (in Dutch) GreenLeft website

Mariko Peters (born April 22, 1969, in Berkeley, California, United States) is a former Dutch politician and civil servant as well as lawyer. She was an MP from November 30, 2006, to September 19, 2012 (with two interruptions because of maternity leave). She focused on matters of foreign policy, judiciary, public administration, mass media and culture.

Peters, who has a Japanese mother and Dutch father, studied law at the University of Leiden until 1995, resulting in Dutch LLM degree. During her studies she worked as an assistant at the research institute "Law and Policy." Between 1990 and 1992 she studied Japanese Literature and Law at the University of Kyoto and the International Christian University. In 1996 she obtained a LL.M. degree at the Columbia University School of Law.

Between 1996 and 2000 she worked as a lawyer at the office De Brauw Blackstone Westbroek. In 2000 she gave up a successful career in law to turn to human rights. In 2000 she took courses in European competition law at the Grotius Academie. She then took a job as a human rights-lawyer at the Organization for Security and Co-operation in Europe (OSCE) mission in Bosnia and Herzegovina. In 2002 she began to work for the Dutch ministry of Foreign Affairs as policy advisor. In 2004 she became adjudant chef de poste at the Dutch embassy in Afghanistan. Since 2006 she worked as an advisor for the Afghan minister of Foreign Affairs, as representative of the Dutch government.

In September 2006, she unexpectedly became fourth candidate on the GreenLeft list for the 2006 elections. She had been member of the party since 2001. She was asked to put forth her candidacy by Farah Karimi, former Foreign Affairs spokesperson of the GreenLeft, when Karimi visited Afghanistan. In November 2006 she became a member of the House of Representatives.

In June 2010 Mariko Peters was elected for a second term in Parliament, having again been placed fourth on the list of the GreenLeft party by the congress. Her term lasted until September 2012. Among her achievements was the writing of a new Freedom of Information law Wet Openbaarheid van Bestuur (Wob for short) which she led with a group of experts, crowd-sourcing the preamble in a competition. The proposal was accompanied by an innovative software program allowing citizens to access government information freely according to their interests, comment on it and share it by social media.
