= Ab Harrewijn =

Dutch politician (1954–2002)

Albert Bastiaan "Ab" Harrewijn (22 November 1954 – 13 May 2002) was a Dutch politician who was a member of the House of Representatives and chairman of the GroenLinks party.

== Biography ==
Harrewijn was born 22 November 1954, in Giessen-Nieuwkerk. He was a preacher and a member of the Communist Party of the Netherlands (CPN). He was strongly committed to helping people in the lowest ranks of society: the homeless, social security claimants and addicts. He was active in the CPN at the municipal and provincial level.

On 1 February 1995 Harrewijn became partijvoorzitter (chairman) of the GreenLeft Party, which had emerged after a merger of the CPN, the Christian left Evangelical People's Party and Political Party of Radicals, and the left-socialist Pacifist Socialist Party in 1991. He remained in that position until the 1998 elections when he was elected to the House of Representatives of the Netherlands. Here he focused on defence and social affairs. This earned him the nickname "General Ab". As GreenLeft defence spokesperson, he was a member of the temporary committee on decision-making procedures for military operations.

Harrewijn stood again in the 2002 elections. However, a few days before the 15 May election date he suffered a massive stroke, which ended his life two days before the election (the stroke may have been induced by the stress of the 6 May 2002 announcement of the murder of Pim Fortuyn). The Leftwing Cheek, the GreenLeft platform for religion and politics, instituted an Ab Harrewijn Prize in his honour, for creative, small initiatives for people in the lowest ranks of society. The National Client Council organizes a yearly lecture in his honour. In 2006 the Harrewijn Law was adopted. This was based on an initiative of Harrewijn and fellow GreenLeft MP Paul Rosenmöller, which seeks to inform works councils of the salaries of the top levels of management and its Board of directors.

Harrewijn died on 13 May 2002, in Utrecht.
