= Paul Rosenmöller =

Dutch television presenter, politician, and former trade unionist

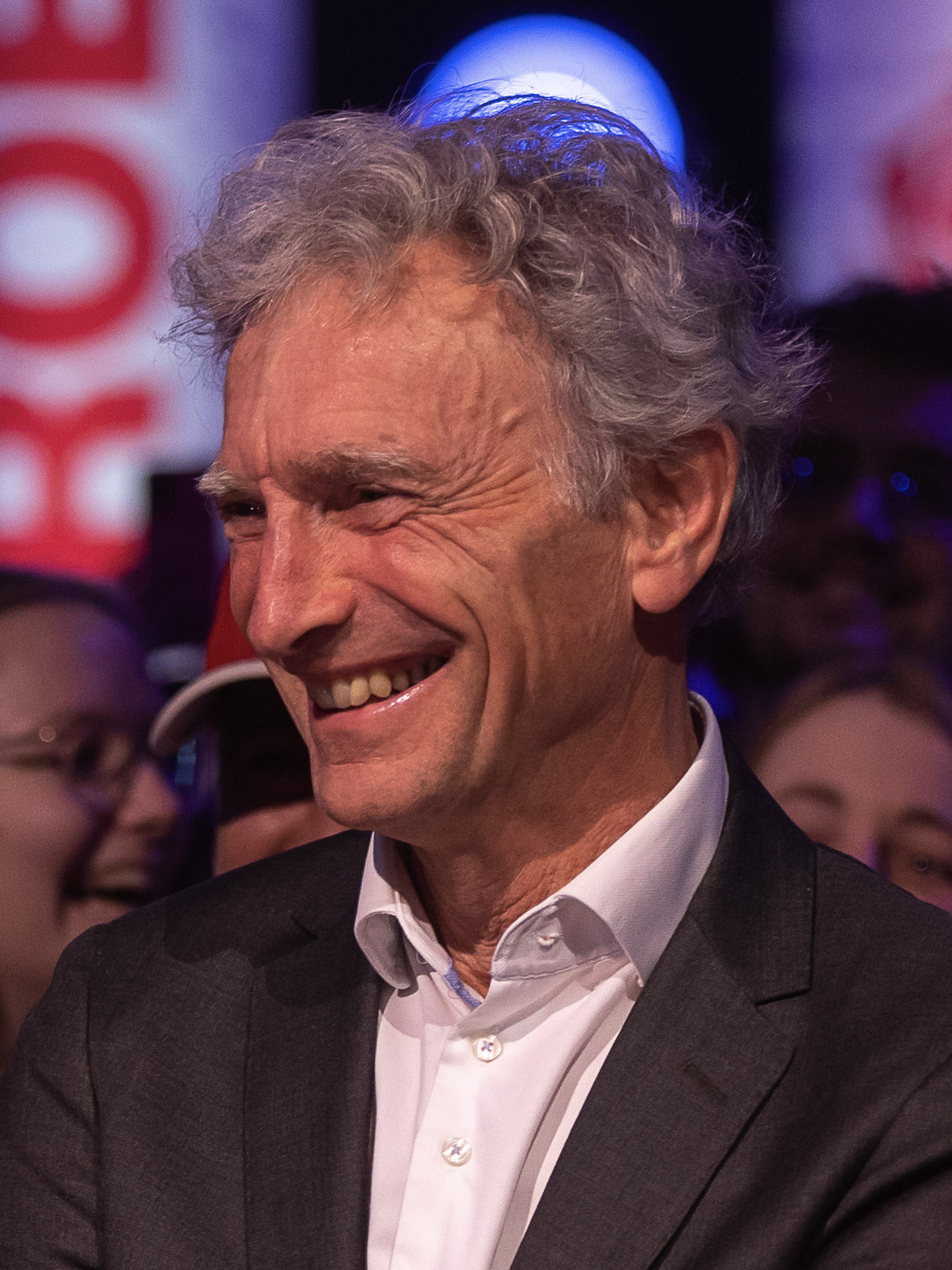
- Rosenmöller in 2023

Leader of Progressief Nederland in the Senate
- Incumbent
- Assumed office 13 June 2023
- Preceded by: Office established

Member of the Senate
- Incumbent
- Assumed office 11 June 2019

Leader of GroenLinks in the House of Representatives
- In office 4 May 1994 – 26 November 2002
- Preceded by: Ina Brouwer
- Succeeded by: Femke Halsema

Member of the House of Representatives
- In office 6 September 1989 – 29 January 2003

Personal details
- Born: 11 May 1956 (age 70) Den Helder, Netherlands
- Party: GroenLinks (until 2026); PRO (since 2026)
- Occupation: Politician, television presenter, trade unionist

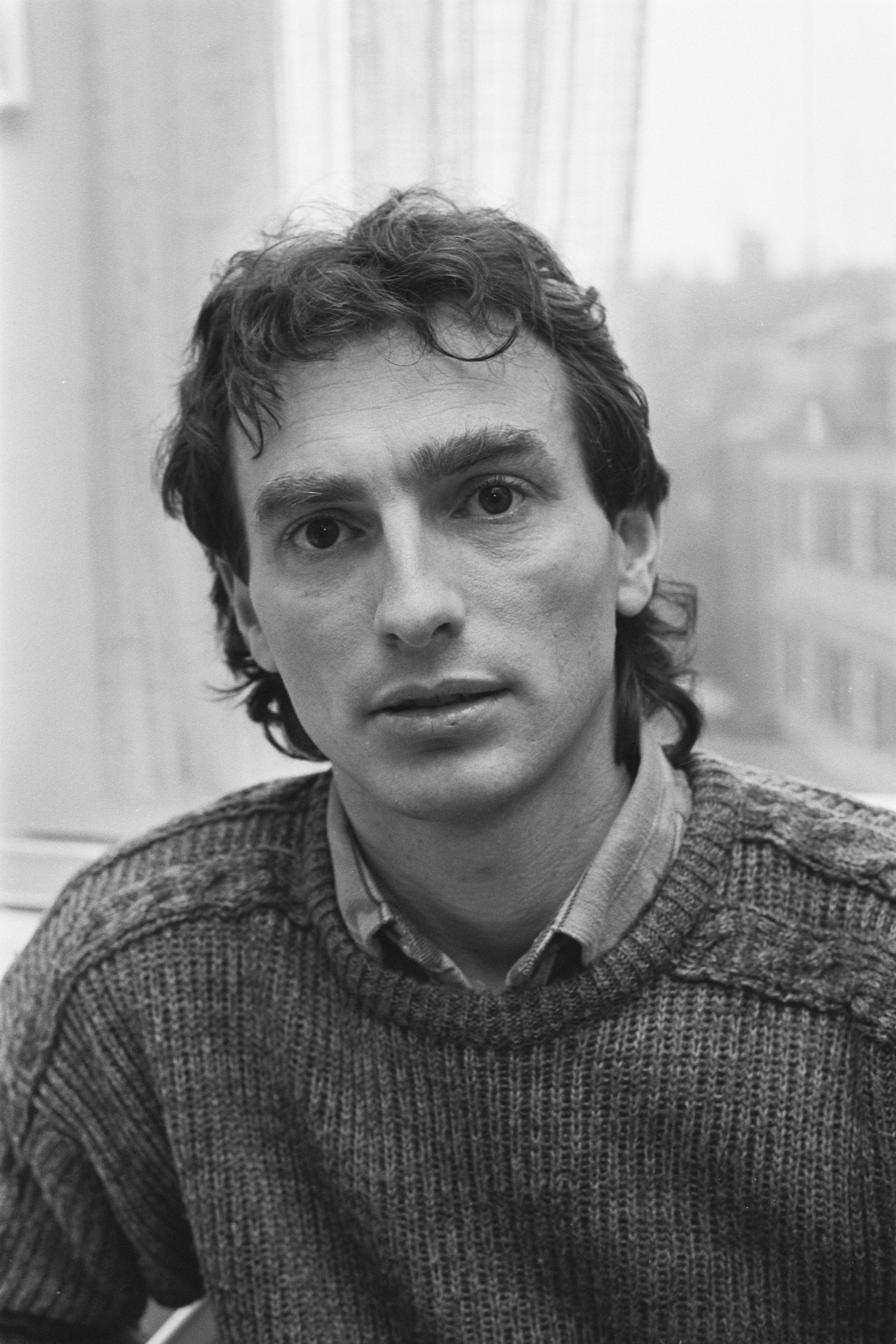
Paul Rosenmöller (1987)

Paul Rosenmöller (born 11 May 1956) is a Dutch politician and former trade unionist and television presenter. Between 1989 and 2003, he was member of the Dutch House of Representatives for GroenLinks and was party leader from 1994. Rosenmöller has been a member of the Senate for GroenLinks since June 2019 and leader of GroenLinks-PvdA and Progressief Nederland (PRO) in the Senate since June 2023.

== Biography ==
=== Early life ===
Rosenmöller was born into a Catholic family in Den Helder in 1956; his father was CEO of Vroom & Dreesmann. After finishing atheneum-b in Haarlem in 1974, Rosenmöller studied sociology. During his studies, Rosenmöller became associated with radical socialist, Maoist groups. He stopped studying in 1978 to work in the Port of Rotterdam. He worked for the shipping company Müller Thomson. In 1985, he became a member of the board of the Transportation branch of the Federation of Dutch Trade Unions (FNV) in Rotterdam. He negotiated with the Confederation of Netherlands Industry and Employers (VNO–NCW) and acted as spokesperson during several strikes. Rosenmöller rose to national fame for his radical position in these negotiations and strikes. He was a member of the Group of Marxist–Leninists/Red Dawn (GML/RM) from 1976 to 1982. The GML/RM wanted to establish a communist state in the Netherlands and sympathized with several communist regimes, such as the People's Republic of China, the People's Socialist Republic of Albania and the Khmer Rouge of Cambodia. Rosenmöller was criticized about 20 years later because of his past in this organisation. The human right abuses by these regimes were often cited by critics.

=== Political career ===
In 1989, he became member of the newly founded party GroenLinks. GroenLinks was formed by four other parties, but Rosenmöller joined as an independent. In the 1989 general election, he was the sixth on the list of GroenLinks and the first independent; he was narrowly elected to the House of Representatives. In 1993 he was candidate party leader together with Leoni Sipkes, but they lost the internal elections to Mohamed Rabbae and Ina Brouwer. After the defeat of GroenLinks in the 1994 general election, Rosenmöller became the party leader.

As party leader he provided opposition against the first and second cabinets of Prime Minister Wim Kok. In 2002, however, the political climate had changed. Rosenmöller participated in the opposition against the rise of Pim Fortuyn. At a party congress, he described Fortuyn's political position as "not just right but extreme right". He lost the 2002 general election after the assassination of Fortuyn. In the hardened political climate after the murder of Fortuyn, serious threats against Rosenmöller's life and family were made. Because of this, Rosenmöller left politics. His successor as leader of GroenLinks was Femke Halsema.

As member of parliament, Rosenmöller showed interest in the situation of the Netherlands Antilles and social participation of immigrants. In addition to being leader of the parliamentary group, he was also spokesperson for foreign affairs, finance, traffic and water management and Antillean affairs. He was chairman of the standing committee for Netherlands Antillean and Aruban Affairs.

In 2018, Rosenmöller was approached by Jesse Klaver with the question of whether he would like to become party leader for GroenLinks in the Senate. He accepted the offer and after the 2019 Senate election he became leader of the eight-person group. The party congress of 4 February 2023 again chose Rosenmöller as the party leader for the 2023 Senate election. After these elections, GroenLinks and the Labour Party were merged. Since 13 June 2023, Rosenmöller has been leader of this group. During the annual General Political Debate in October 2024, he introduced a motion calling the planned declaration of an asylum crisis by the Schoof cabinet through emergency legislation undesirable, and he urged for an alternative approach. The motion was carried by the Senate, where opposition parties held a majority. Minister of Asylum and Migration Marjolein Faber responded that she remained intent on using emergency powers.

=== Television ===
In 2003, after leaving politics, Rosenmöller became a television presenter for the Interkerkelijke Omroep Nederland (IKON), which was an ecumenical broadcasting organisation.

=== Other activities ===
Between 2003 and 2005 Rosenmöller chaired the Commission on Participation of Women from Ethnic Minorities (PaVEM), a government advisory committee on the position of migrant women, in which Queen Máxima had a seat.

== Personal life ==
Paul Rosenmöller is married and has five children.
