= Bram van Ojik =

Dutch politician and diplomat

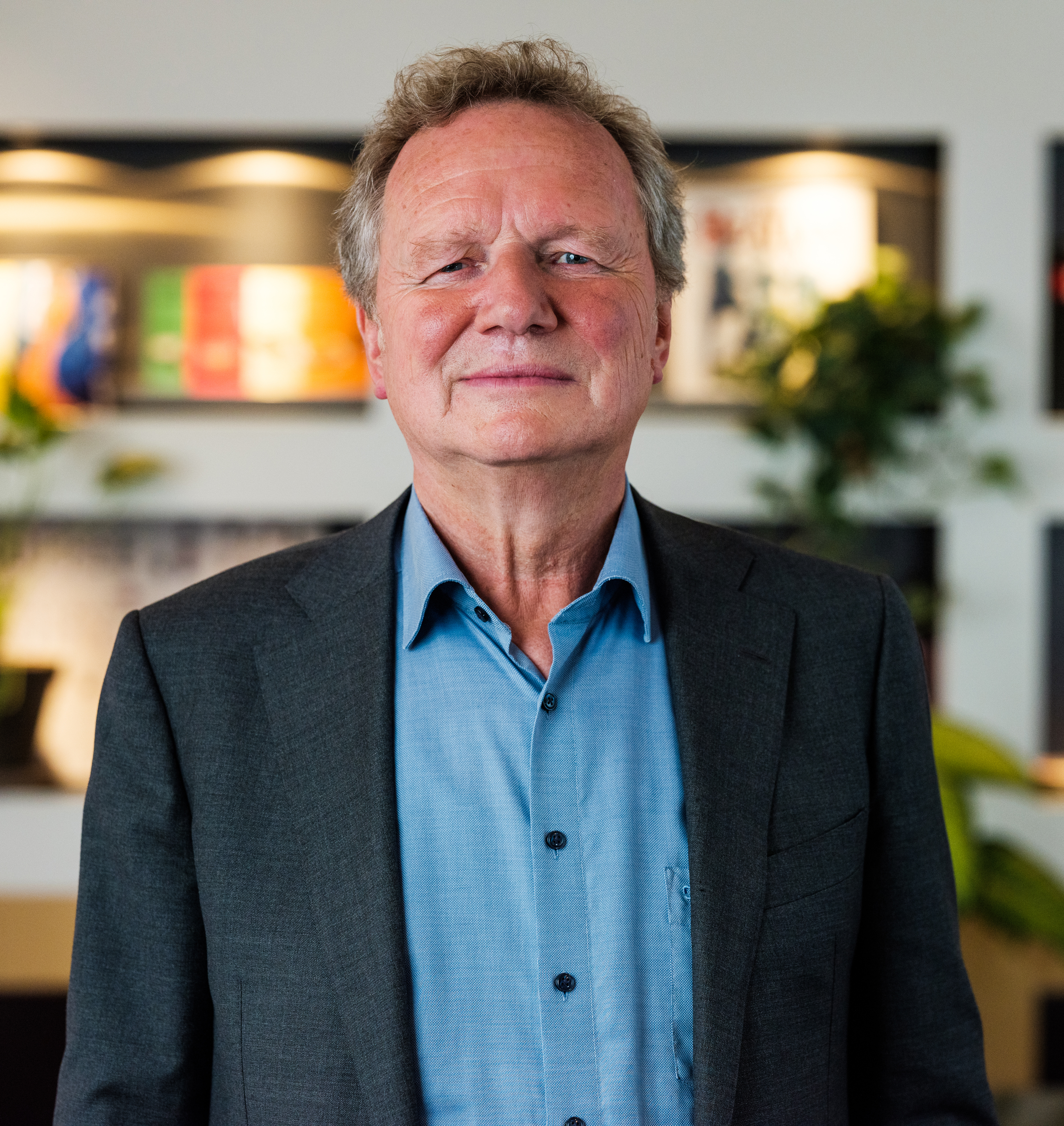
- Bram van Ojik in 2019

Member of the House of Representatives
- In office 23 March 2017 – 31 March 2021
- In office 20 September 2012 – 20 May 2015
- In office 21 April 1993 – 17 May 1994
- Parliamentary group: GreenLeft

Leader of GreenLeft
- In office 8 October 2012 – 12 May 2015
- Preceded by: Jolande Sap
- Succeeded by: Jesse Klaver

Parliamentary leader in the House of Representatives
- In office 8 October 2012 – 12 May 2015
- Preceded by: Jolande Sap
- Succeeded by: Jesse Klaver
- Parliamentary group: GreenLeft

Ambassador of the Netherlands to Benin
- In office 1 May 2003 – 1 August 2006
- Preceded by: Unknown
- Succeeded by: Caroline Weijers

Chairman of the Political Party of Radicals
- In office 16 April 1988 – 21 April 1990
- Leader: Ria Beckers
- Preceded by: Janneke van der Plaat
- Succeeded by: Office discontinued

Personal details
- Born: Abraham van Ojik; 22 September 1954 (age 72) Veenendaal, Netherlands
- Party: GreenLeft (from 1989)
- Other political affiliations: Political Party of Radicals (1973–1989)
- Children: 2
- Education: Vrije Universiteit Amsterdam (Master of Economics)

Abraham "Bram" van Ojik (born 22 September 1954) is a Dutch diplomat and politician of the GreenLeft (GL) party and activist. Since 23 March 2017 he has been a member of the House of Representatives. He previously served in the House from 1993 to 1994, and from 2012 to 2015. In the latter three years he also served as leader of GroenLinks. He had also been an Envoy of the Netherlands for human migration since 20 October 2015.

== Political career ==
=== Political Party of Radicals ===
Van Ojik comes from the Political Party of Radicals, one of the four parties that merged to form GroenLinks in 1989. Van Ojik had been member of the PPR since 1973. Between 1972 and 1980 Van Ojik studied economics at the Free University. He specialized in development economics. Between 1978 and 1981, he served on the board for radical education. As a conscientious objector, Van Ojik did his alternative service at the development organization NIO. After that he worked for the scientific bureau of the PPR until 1983. Here he wrote a book on basic income. In 1986 he co-authored the PPR's election program. Between 1985 and 1988, he was editor-in-chief of the PPR party paper. Between 1988 and 1990 he was party chair of the PPR. As chair of the PPR, he was involved in the negotiations over the formation of GroenLinks, a new political party formed by the merger of the Pacifist Socialist Party, Communist Party of Netherlands, and Evangelical People's Party. Van Ojik had always favoured cooperation between the four parties, but the PPR party board soon wanted to abandon negotiations. Van Ojik had to defend this, although he did not support it. The formal PPR delegation was replaced by an informal delegation by former party chair Wim de Boer. In 1989 the talks led to the formation of a new party. Van Ojik became a member of the first party board. In addition to these activities, Van Ojik freelance journalist and advisor on the subject of development cooperation. Between 1990 and 1993 Van Ojik worked for Oxfam NOVIB.

=== GroenLinks ===
Between 1993 and 1994, Van Ojik was member of the House of Representatives for GroenLinks. He replaced PPR member Ria Beckers. He spoke on agriculture, development cooperation and science. He prepared an initiative to limit the use of wood from the tropics. It was finally proposed in 1994 by Marijke Vos. At the 1994 election Van Ojik was put on the seventh place of the GroenLinks list, the same place he had in 1989. GroenLinks only won five seats. He also co-authored the GroenLinks election program.

In 1997 Van Ojik again co-authored GroenLinks election program for the 1998 election.

For GroenLinks, Van Ojik chaired a committee which evaluated the municipal elections (2006), parliamentary (2006) and provincial (2007), all of which GroenLinks had lost. Then he became chair of the committee which oversaw a debate within GroenLinks on the party's principles, strategy and organizations. This led to a new manifesto of principles in 2008 of which Van Ojik is one of the co-authors.

After national elections on 12 September 2012 the size of the representation of the GroenLinks party within the House of Representatives was reduced from ten seats to four seats. On 8 October 2012, Van Ojik became leader in the House of Representatives for GroenLinks; some days earlier his predecessor Jolande Sap was forced to step down as leader in the House of Representatives for GroenLinks by the board of the GroenLinks party.

=== Further career ===
After not being re-elected for the Dutch House of Representatives, Van Ojik worked for the environmental organization MilieuDefensie between 1994 and 1997. In 1995 he co-authored a book on corals together with Labour Party politician Max van den Berg. In 1997 Van Ojik switched to the Dutch Ministry of Foreign Affairs, where he became director of public communication on development cooperation. In 1998 he again co-authored a book with Van der Berg, now on development cooperation. In 2001 Van Ojik became ambassador in general service. He organized external contacts for the Dutch Minister for Development Cooperation. In 2003 Van Ojik became the Dutch ambassador to Benin. In 2006 he returned to the Netherlands to become director of the inspection for evaluation of development cooperation policy of the Minister of Foreign Affairs. He also helped the government prepare policy to meet the millennium goals for the fourth Balkenende cabinet.

On 12 May 2015, his resignation as Leader of GroenLinks and as member of parliament was announced. Jesse Klaver took over his role as leader of the party, while Rik Grashoff took up Van Ojik's seat in parliament on 20 May 2015.

After the 2017 general election Van Ojik returned to the House, taking office on 23 March 2017.

Party political offices
Preceded by Janneke van der Plaat	Chairman of the Political; Party of Radicals; 1988–1990	Succeeded by Office discontinued
Preceded by Jolande Sap	Leader of GreenLeft; 2012–2015	Succeeded by Jesse Klaver
Preceded by Jolande Sap	Parliamentary leader of GreenLeft in the House of Representatives; 2012–2015	Succeeded by Jesse Klaver
Diplomatic posts
Unknown	Ambassador of the Netherlands to Benin; 2003–2006	Succeeded by Caroline Weijers
