= Jolande Sap =

Dutch politician (born 1963)

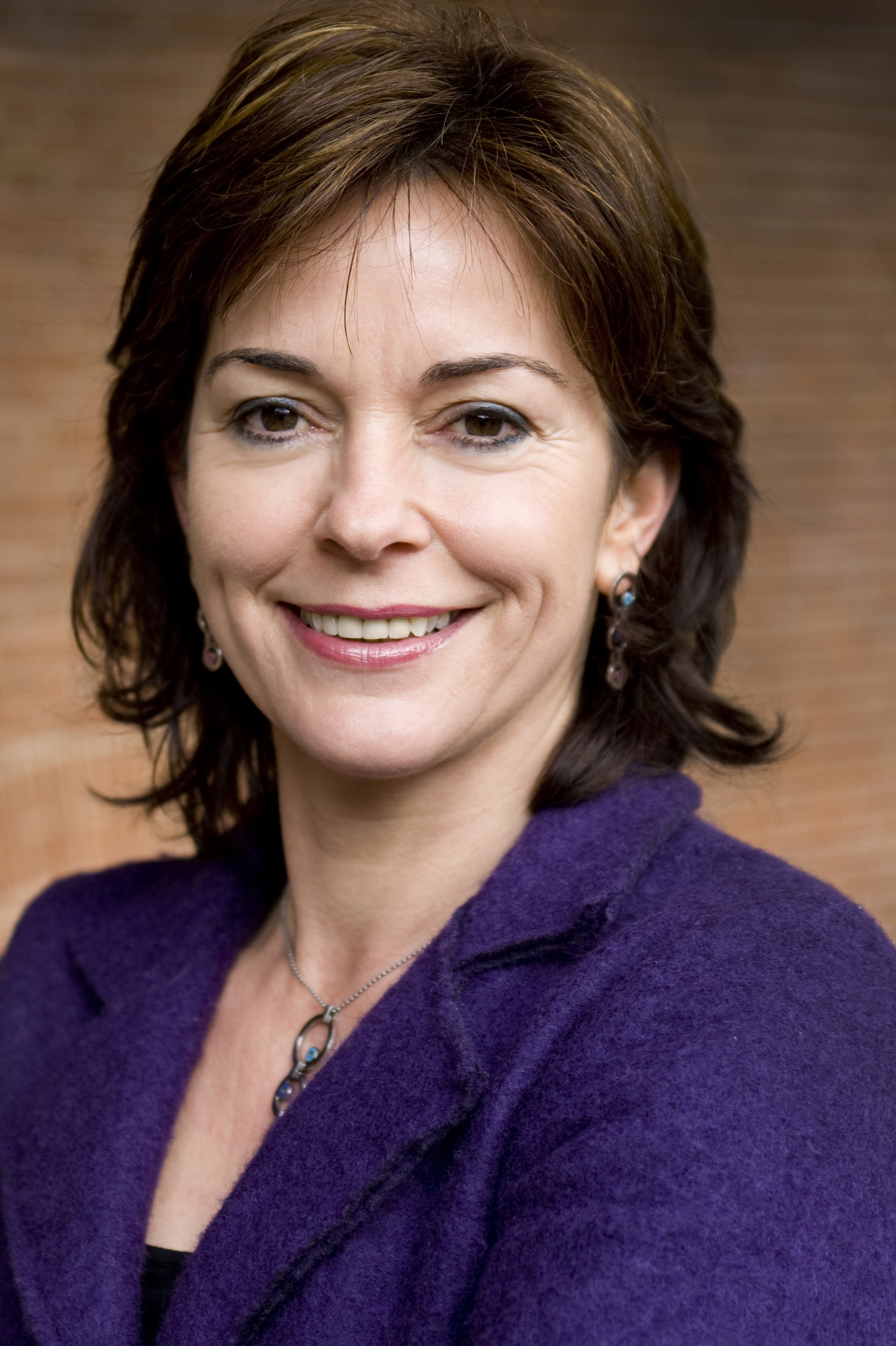

Leader of GroenLinks in the House of Representatives
- In office 16 December 2010 – 5 October 2012
- Preceded by: Femke Halsema
- Succeeded by: Bram van Ojik

Member of the House of Representatives
- In office 2 September 2008 – 23 October 2012

Personal details
- Born: 22 May 1963 (age 63) Venlo, Netherlands
- Party: GroenLinks
- Education: Tilburg University (MA in Political Economics and Philosophy)
- Occupation: Politician, academic, civil servant
- Website: (in Dutch) GreenLeft website

Johanna Catharina Maria "Jolande" Sap (born 22 May 1963) is a former Dutch politician and former educator and civil servant. A member of GroenLinks (GL), she replaced Wijnand Duyvendak as a member of the House of Representatives on 3 September 2008, after his resignation. She had temporarily been replacing Mariko Peters from the previous day who was on parental leave. From 16 December 2010 to 5 October 2012 she was party leader as well as parliamentary leader in the House of Representatives, replacing Femke Halsema who announced her retirement from politics as of that date.

== Education ==
Sap studied economics at the Tilburg University between 1981 and 1989 where she specialised in political economy and philosophy.

== Career ==
Between 1985 and 1988 Sap was a student assistant and coordinator at the department of development cooperation. She continued to work at the University of Amsterdam as researcher for three years. She studied the difference in pay between men and women. After that she became a research associate at the government Council for Emancipation. She initiated "Out of the Margin": two international conferences on feminist economics in 1992 and 1998. This led to a book, Out of the Margin. Feminist Perspectives on Economics, which she edited with Susan Feiner. Since 1993 she was active within GroenLinks, as member of its economic committee.

In 1996 she started to work at the Ministry of Social Affairs and Employment, where she advised top civil servants on emancipation and lifetime-planning policy (combining labour, care and education throughout life), in addition to salary, income and pension policy.

In 2003 she left the ministry to become director of LEEFtijd (LIFEtime). She reoriented LEEFtijd on new issues such as the demographic developments in the Netherlands and lifetime-planning policy. In 2006 she co-authored GroenLinks's election program. She was put on the eighth place of the list of the House of Representatives for the 2006 election. The party only won seven seats. In 2007 she became a member of the panel on principles of the Van Ojik committee, which would organise the discussion leading to a new manifesto of principles. In 2008 she left LEEFtijd for a sabbatical. In August 2008 it was announced that she would replace Wijnand Duyvendak, who was leaving the House of Representatives.

After national elections on 12 September 2012 the size of the representation of the GroenLinks party within the House of Representatives was reduced from 10 seats to 4 seats. On 5 October 2012 Jolande Sap was forced to step down as Leader in the House of Representatives by the party board. Some days later Bram van Ojik became the new Leader in the House of Representatives.

Sap is a specialist on social-economic issues. She values economic independence as an important condition for freedom. She seeks to stimulate emancipation and fight social exclusion. She wants to work on practical policies which would implement GroenLinks ideals such as self-realisation, fairness and sustainability.

== See also ==
- Feminist economics
- List of feminist economists
