= Mohamed Rabbae =

Dutch politician (1941–2022)

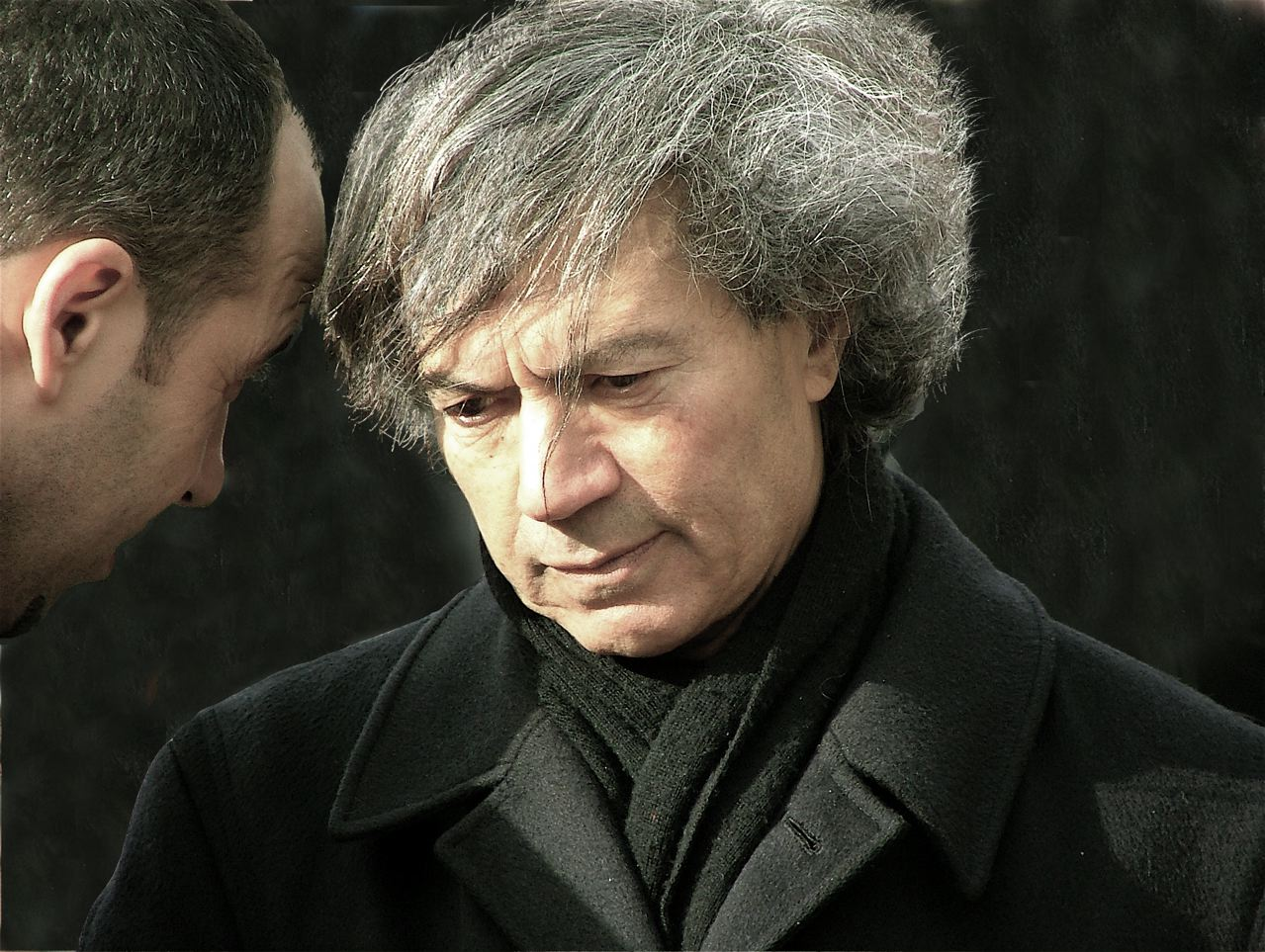

Member of the House of Representatives
- In office 17 May 1994 – 23 May 2002

Personal details
- Born: 8 March 1941 Berrechid, Morocco
- Died: 17 May 2022 (aged 81) Amersfoort, Province of Utrecht, Netherlands
- Party: GreenLeft (1993–2010)
- Education: University of Amsterdam
- Occupation: Politician, activist

Mohamed Rabbae (8 March 1941 – 17 May 2022) was a Moroccan-born Dutch politician and activist.

== Life ==
Born in Berrechid, in the French protectorate in Morocco, then controlled by Vichy France, Rabbae fled in 1966 as a student from Morocco to the Netherlands, when activists against the regime of King Hassan II were taken prisoner. In the Netherlands he finished his studies, carried out various activities and was involved in various actions for foreigners' rights, including the so-called 182 Moroccans church after asylum-seekers were threatened to be expelled by the then State Secretary of Justice Bert Haars in the First Van Agt cabinet. In 1983, he was director of the Dutch Center Foreigners (NCB). At the 1994 Dutch general election, he became an MP for the political party GreenLeft. For the elections of that year he was one of the two top candidates, along with Ina Brouwer. During the campaign, in an interview with NRC Handelsblad, Rabbae expressed understanding for people who wanted the book The Satanic Verses by Salman Rushdie banned. He said that "an attempt to have such a book banned with democratic means is better than following Khomeini and other forces of darkness".

In 2002, Rabbae left parliament. For some time he was an alderman in Leiden. On his first working day he resigned as an alderman.

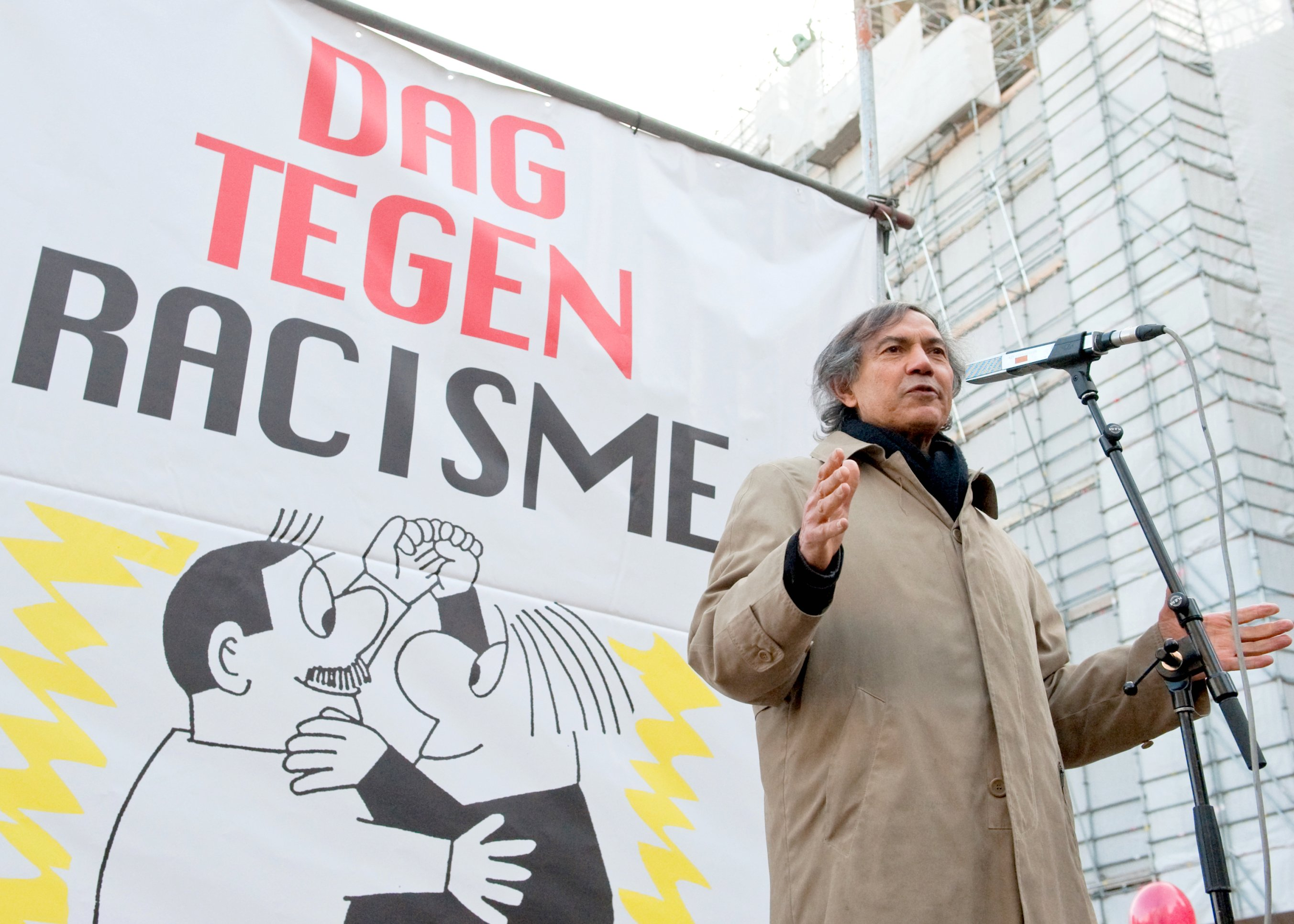
Rabbae in 2010

On 7 April 2008, Rabbae stated in an interview that there should be an Islamic political party, "a kind of Islamic Christian Democratic Appeal". He said he would be available as an adviser for such a party. Three months later, in another interview to the same newspaper, he confirmed this declaration but specified that he himself did not intend to leave his then-present party Groenlinks, "as long as Groenlinks stays in the vicinity of my ideas".

During a political meeting in November 2010, Rabbae labelled as a fascist the far-right PVV leader Geert Wilders. In the aftermath, the Groenlinks (GL) leader Femke Halsema tweeted first that he did not speak for the party, then that he had gone too far according to her, but that she recognized his freedom of speech. After the first tweet, he sent his resignation letter to the party. The GL top was also against a judicial procedure against Wilders by several people, among whom Rabbae and a GL MP, René Danen, who had subsequently been blocked from becoming a member of the party top.

Rabbae died on 17 May 2022 at the age of 81.

== Publication ==
Naast de Amicales nu de UMMON; De mantelorganisaties van de Marokkaanse autoriteiten in Nederland, Nederlands Centrum Buitenlanders, 1993 (Now besides the Amicales, the Unie van Marokkaanse Moskeeorganisaties in Nederland (UMMON); The mantle organizations of the Moroccan authorities in the Netherlands) ISBN 9055170119, 9789055170111
