= Isabelle Diks =

Dutch politician

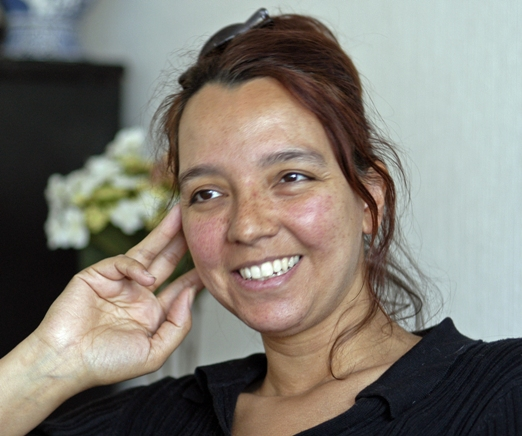
Isabelle Diks

Lillian Isabella (Isabelle) Diks (Heerlen, 25 July 1965) is a Dutch GreenLeft politician. Between 1 September 2008 and 1 January 2009 she replaced Member of Parliament Mariko Peters as member of the House of Representatives. Peters was on maternity leave.

Diks attended a school specialized in arts between 1977 and 1983. She studied for a year at the Academy of Creative Art in Maastricht and continued to study at the Charles Montaigne Fashion Academy in Amsterdam between 1984 and 1986. Between 1987 and 1988, she worked as a stylist. After 1988, Diks worked as an independent designer of wedding dresses and evening gowns in Apeldoorn. In 2006, she left her business to move to Leeuwarden. Between 2002 and 2004, she studied cultural studies at the Open University (without graduating). From 2004, she studied International Relations at the University of Groningen, where she specialized in European cooperation, international law and European law. She has also owned and operated a bed and breakfast in Leeuwarden since 2006.

Diks had been active within GreenLeft since 1994, first in the municipal council of Apeldoorn, where she served as chair of the local parliamentary party and as member of the board of the regional water board, and later as member of the States-Provincial in Gelderland, where she served as vice-chair (2003–2006). Between 2006 and 2008, she was a member of the national board of GreenLeft, where she served as international secretary. In 2006, she stood on the list for the general election on the tenth place. She was not elected.

In August 2008, it was announced that Diks would temporarily replace Mariko Peters as MP. Between 1 September 2008 and 1 January 2009 Peters would be on maternity leave. The Dutch House of Representatives has a special regulation that MPs on maternity leave may be replaced temporarily without giving up their seats. Formally, Matthieu Heemelaar was the candidate to succeed Peters as he was higher on the list, but he relinquished the honour to Diks since she, a specialist on international affairs and the international secretary of the party, had the expertise to replace Peters, the foreign affairs spokesperson of the GreenLeft. On 1 January 2008 she became an alderwoman in Leeuwarden. She served once more in the House of Representatives between 23 March 2017 and 1 May 2020. Since 22 April 2020 she has been alderwoman in Groningen.
