= Jesse Klaver =

Dutch politician (born 1986)

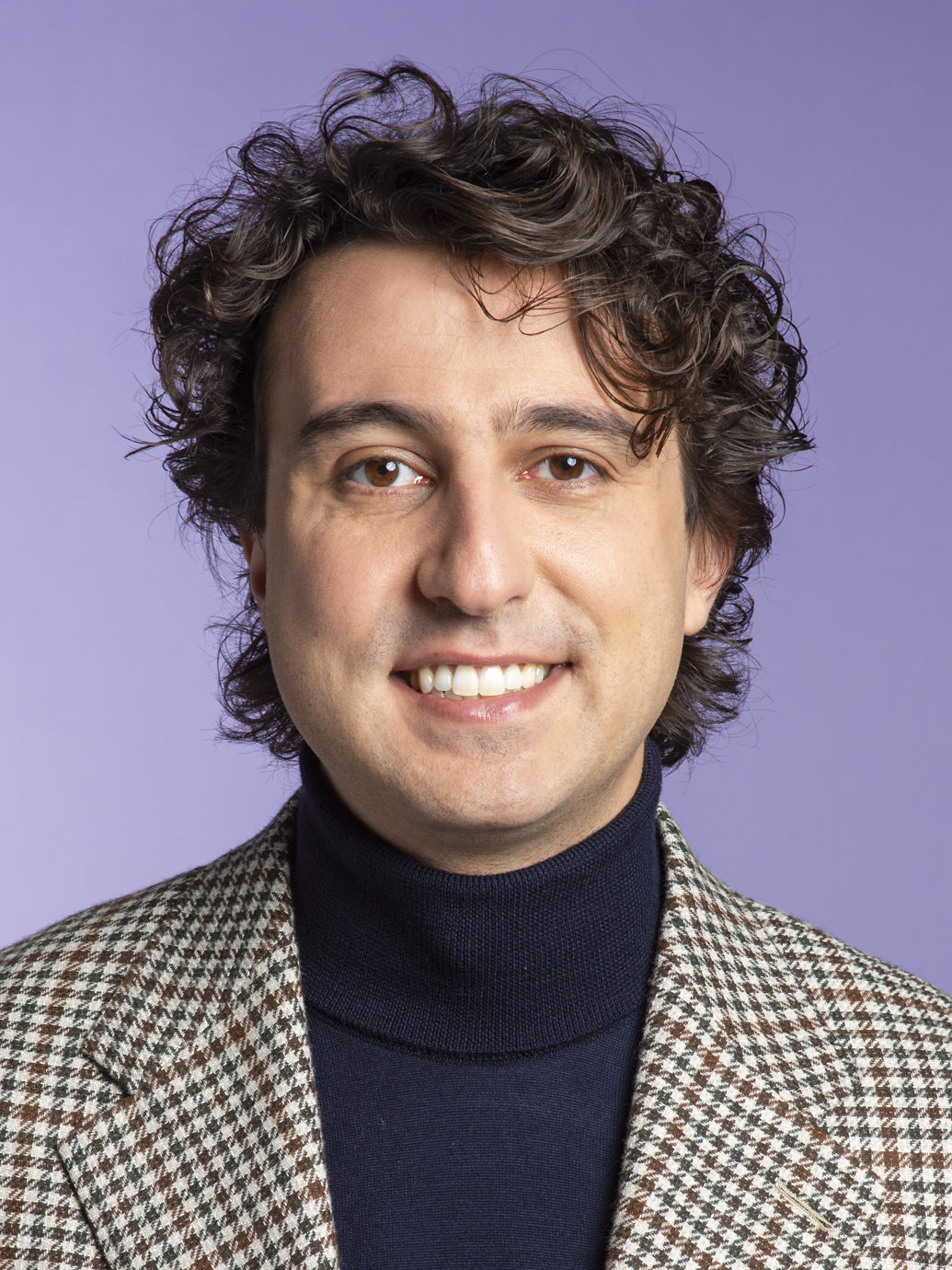
- Klaver in 2020

Leader of Progressief Nederland in the House of Representatives
- Incumbent
- Assumed office 1 July 2026
- Preceded by: Post established

Leader of GroenLinks–PvdA in the House of Representatives
- In office 3 November 2025 – 1 July 2026
- Preceded by: Frans Timmermans
- Succeeded by: Post abolished

Leader of GroenLinks
- In office 12 May 2015 – 1 July 2026
- Preceded by: Bram van Ojik
- Succeeded by: Post abolished

Leader of GroenLinks in the House of Representatives
- In office 12 May 2015 – 27 October 2023
- Preceded by: Bram van Ojik
- Succeeded by: Post abolished

Member of the House of Representatives
- Incumbent
- Assumed office 17 June 2010

Personal details
- Born: Jesse Feras Klaver; 1 May 1986 (age 40) Roosendaal, Netherlands
- Party: Progressief Nederland (since 2026)
- Other political affiliations: GroenLinks (2006–2026); Labour (2023–2026)
- Spouse: Jolein Klaver (m. 2013)
- Children: 4
- Education: Avans University of Applied Sciences
- Occupation: Politician, trade unionist
- Website: www.jesseklaver.nl

Jesse Feras Klaver (born 1 May 1986) is a Dutch politician who has served as leader of Progressief Nederland (PRO) in the House of Representatives since 2025, a member of the House of Representatives since 2010 and Leader of GroenLinks from 2015 until its merge into PRO. Prior to this, he chaired the youth union of the Christian National Trade Union Federation from 2009 to 2010.

== Early life ==
Jesse Feras Klaver was born on 1 May 1986 in Roosendaal. His father has a Riffian-Moroccan background and his mother has a mixed Dutch and Indonesian background. He grew up in a social housing project without the presence of his father. His grandparents played a large role in his upbringing. Between 1999 and 2004, he attended the VMBO at the Waldorf school Michael College in Prinsenbeek.

Between 2006 and 2009, he was member of the board of DWARS, the youth organization of GroenLinks. First, he was duo-chair for organization matters, later he was secretary and then he was elected chair. As chair, he supported the "freedom-loving course set by Femke Halsema" against the more communitarian elements within the party. In addition to serving in this function, he studied social work at the Avans University of Applied Sciences and the transition program for the master political science at the University of Amsterdam. He quit the transition program before finishing it.

On 17 September 2009, he was elected chair of the youth union of the CNV. As chair he announced he would put less emphasis on the Christian character of the CNV. He supported raising the retirement age to 67. On 1 December 2009, he was appointed to the Social and Economic Council. Being 23 years old, he was the youngest member ever to sit on this council. In addition to chairing the CNV youth union, he co-authored the 2010 GroenLinks election manifesto; he was member of the board of the Christian Social Youth Congress and he was founder of the climate NGO Youth Copenhagen Coalition.

== Political career ==
In 2010, Klaver was placed seventh on the list of GroenLinks for the 2010 elections. GroenLinks won ten seats. Klaver became spokesperson social affairs, employment, education and sport. His maiden speech concerned higher education.

In 2010, he was nominated as "political talent of the year" by political journalists. For the 2012 elections Klaver headed the campaign team of GroenLinks and he was fourth on the list of candidates of GroenLinks. This was enough to be elected, as GroenLinks got exactly four seats. His TEDtalk in the late-night talk show Pauw & Witteman in January 2013, was chosen as the best of five young politicians.

In 2013, he co-authored the memo "Mooi Nederland" ("Beautiful Netherlands") with Lutz Jacobi (PvdA) and Stientje van Veldhoven (D66) which set out to protect nature, the landscape, flora and fauna. In 2013, he authored a private member's bill which through transparency sought to reduce food wastage. In 2014, he authored the proposal "Kansen voor kinderen voor het vmbo" ("Opportunities for Children in pre-vocational education").

Klaver received international attention for opposing tax evasion in 2013. Klaver co-authored the agreement on the student benefit with the minister of Education Jet Bussemaker and spokespersons of the VVD, D66, PvdA. He attended the inauguration of King Willem Alexander and took the oath "Zo Waarlijk helpe mij God almachtig".

On 12 May 2015, party leader Bram van Ojik announced that Klaver would be taking over party leadership effective immediately. Until then, Klaver had acted as a spokesperson for finance, agriculture, nature, animal welfare, education, culture and science. He is member of parliamentary committees on foreign affairs, defence, European affairs, economic affairs, finance, education, budgetary control, social affairs, health and procedural affairs.

Klaver continued to be GroenLinks' party leader during the Dutch general election of 2017. His party gained 10 seats, rising to an all-time high of 14, but in the 2021 election fell to 8. He was re-elected on the shared GroenLinks–PvdA list in November 2023, and he became the party's spokesperson on European affairs. When Frans Timmermans resigned as party leader of the alliance due to a disappointing election result in October 2025, the GroenLinks–PvdA group in the House of Representatives chose Klaver to succeed him as parliamentary leader. He retained that position after the two parties formally merged in 2026.

Thanks to his political engagement he was nominated in 2018 as a European Young Leader (EYL40). Klaver is on the 2019 TIME 100 Next List.

== Other activities ==
- Friends of Europe, Member of the Board of Trustees (since 2020)

== Personal life ==
Klaver married his wife Jolein on 3 May 2013. He has four sons.

== Electoral history ==
Electoral history of Jesse Klaver
Year	Body	Party	Pos.	Votes	Result		Ref.
Year	Body	Party	Pos.	Votes	Party seats	Individual	Ref.
2010	House of Representatives	GroenLinks	7	2,466	10	Won	
2012	House of Representatives	GroenLinks	4	3,351	4	Won	
2017	House of Representatives	GroenLinks	1	651,483	14	Won	
2021	House of Representatives	GroenLinks	1	227,982	8	Won	
2023	House of Representatives	GroenLinks–PvdA	3	149,437	25	Won	
2025	House of Representatives	GroenLinks–PvdA	3	107,791	20	Won	
