= Rik Grashoff =

Dutch engineer and politician

Rik Grashof
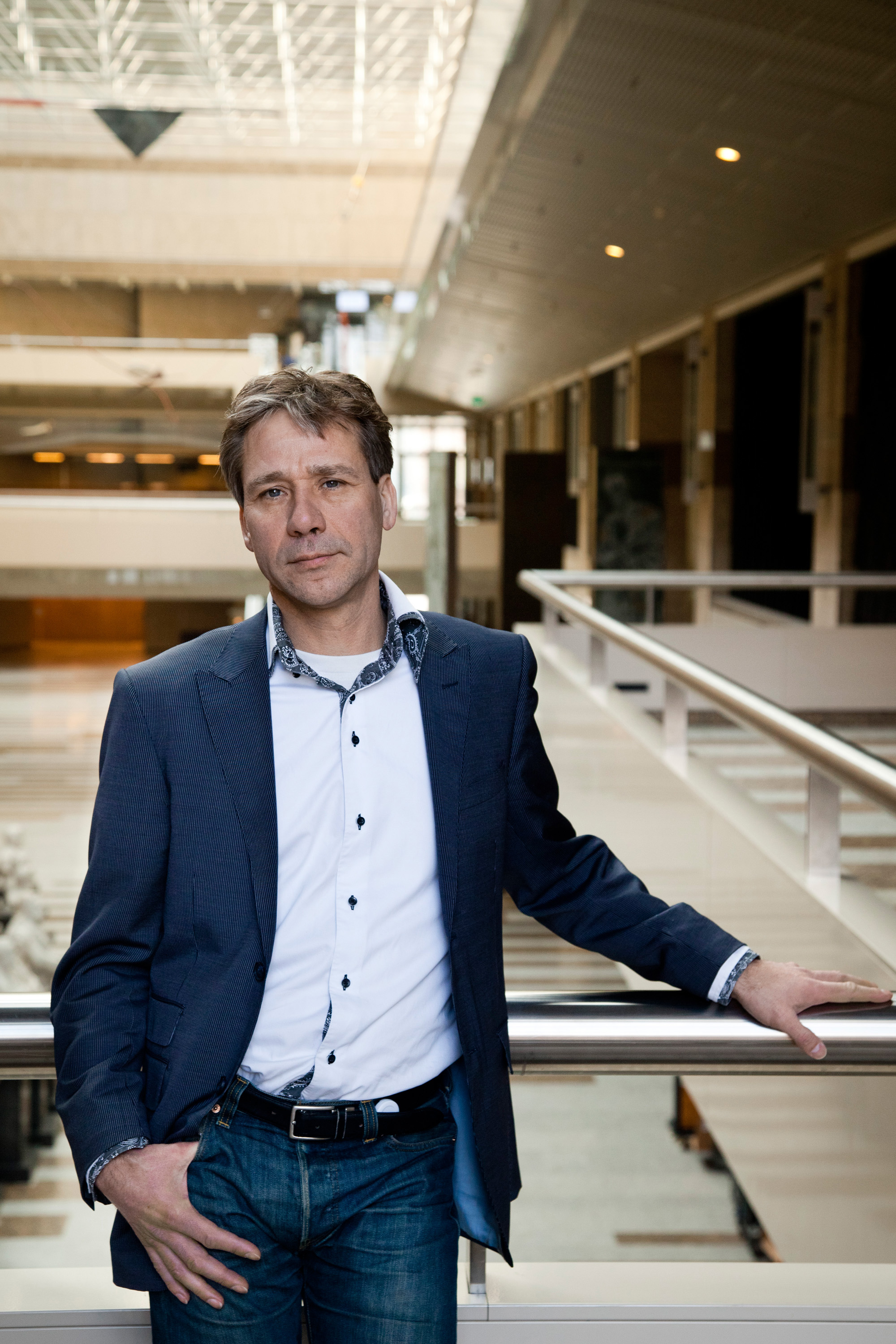

Member of the House of Representatives
- In office 20 May 2015 – 6 June 2018
- In office 23 November 2010 – 19 September 2012

Personal details
- Born: Hendrik Johannes Grashoff; 5 April 1961 (age 65) Krimpen aan den IJssel
- Party: GroenLinks
- Occupation: Politician

Hendrik Johannes "Rik" Grashoff (born 5 April 1961, in Krimpen aan den IJssel) is a Dutch engineer and politician. He is a member of the political party GreenLeft. From 23 November 2010 to 19 September 2012 he was a member of the House of Representatives. He focused on matters of agriculture, defense and public administration. On 20 May 2015 he returned to the House and took up the seat of Bram van Ojik.

== Biography ==
Grashoff studied civil engineering at Delft University of Technology. From 1983 to 1984 he was a member of the National Students Trade Union. He worked as a civil engineer before becoming a full-time politician.

From 1998 to 2006 he was an alderman of the municipality of Delft, where his responsibilities included transportation. From 2008 to 2010 he was an alderman of the municipality of Rotterdam. His responsibilities included culture and participation.

On 6 June 2018, Grashoff announced he would resign as member of the House of Representatives.
