= List of candidates in the 1989 Dutch general election =

Prior to the 1989 Dutch general election, contesting parties put forward party lists.

== 1: Christian Democratic Appeal ==
Candidate list for the Christian Democratic Appeal
Number	Candidate	Votes	Result
1	Ruud Lubbers	2,970,093	Elected
2	Bert de Vries	14,374	Elected
3	Hans van den Broek	7,988	Elected
4	Gerrit Braks	7,015	Elected
5	Yvonne van Rooy	19,126	Elected
6-30	Regional candidates		
Total			

=== Regional candidates ===
Regional candidates for Christian Democratic Appeal
Candidate	Votes	Result	Number						
Candidate	Votes	Result	's-Hertogenbosch, Tilburg	Arnhem, Nijmegen, Zwolle, Lelystad	Rotterdam, Dordrecht	Amsterdam, Den Helder, Haarlem, Utrecht	Den Haag, Leiden	Middelburg, Maastricht	Leeuwarden, Groningen, Assen
Harry Aarts	532	Elected	8						
C.H.G. Adams-Ruiten	535							26	
H.G. van den Akker-van der Schoot	297		25						
Marius van Amelsvoort	636	Elected	11						
Ada Baas-Jansen	253			20					
A.J. Bakker-Osinga	250				22				
Ph.J. van Beeck Calkoen	354			23					
Marten Beinema	201	Elected						11	
Pieter Jan Biesheuvel	151	Elected, but declined				17			
Ank Bijleveld	1,503	Elected		18					
Bearn Bilker	228								25
Elly Blanksma-van den Heuvel	476		20						
Henk Bleker	121								27
Liesbeth Bloemen	376	Replacement		21					
Bas Jan van Bochove	152			28					
Joop de Boe	82							18	
Mieke Boers-Wijnberg	486	Elected	12						
Lucas Bolsius	62				25				
J. Booij	156					22			
Fred Borgman	419	Elected					15		
Elco Brinkman	5,804	Elected	7	7	7	7	7	6	7
Piet Bruinooge	187							16	
V.H. Bruins Slot	141						28		
Piet Bukman	1,129	Elected		8	8	8	8	7	
Vincent van der Burg	200	Elected					12		
Wim van de Camp	232		15			15			
B.J.M. Damen	295				30				
Wim Deetman	2,610	Elected	6	6	6	6	6		6
T. Demirhan	174						24		
Asje van Dijk	180	Replacement				21			
Arie Doelman-Pel	545	Elected							11
J.G.H. Draijer	40					27			
G.H.M. Driessen	1,203							23	
M.C.E. Eikenboom	174				21				
Klaasje Eisses-Timmerman	244	Replacement							22
Berry Esselink	554	Elected		15					
H.C.J. van Etten	81				23				
Huib Eversdijk	1,985	Elected	30		9			8	8
Wim van Fessem	305		19						
Ton Frinking	93	Elected			12				
Léon Frissen	4,260	Elected						13	
L.A. van Gelder	82				29				
Gerrit Gerritse	173	Elected					11		
H.G.M. Giezeman	140					23			
Mirjam de Goeij-Smulders	266					25			
Jan de Graaf	321	Elected		19					20
Hans Gualthérie van Weezel	340	Elected, but declined				14		15	
J. Hagendoorn	48					19			
B.J.A. Hakvoort	543						30		
A.R.A. van den Ham	83						23		
L.P.H. Hameleers	516							24	
Enneüs Heerma	501	Elected					9		9
Frans Jozef van der Heijden	220	Elected			15				
Jan Heijkoop	91				28				
C.W.J. van Helvoirt	170		26						
Ben Hennekam	747	Elected	10						
Ad Hermes	283	Elected					14		
Hans Hillen	155	Replacement					21		
J.Th.M. Hoedemaker	178		28						
Y.R. Hoekstra	135								24
Maria van der Hoeven	4,779	Replacement						14	
Margot Hofman-Ruijters	753							21	
M. Holst-Brink	100					28			
Jaap de Hoop Scheffer	274	Elected				13			14
Jan van Houwelingen	480	Elected		10	13				
H.E. Houwers	236			29					
Hans Huibers	154	Elected, but declined					19		
Joost van Iersel	187	Elected	13			11			
Minouche Janmaat-Abee	274	Replacement							18
Mechtild de Jong	178	Elected			19				
Gerrit de Jong	168	Elected				10			
J. de Jong-den Held	248			27					
Frank Kerckhaert	314			22					
Conny Kerkhof-Mos	518		18						
Helmer Koetje	358	Elected, but declined					18		16
Gert Koffeman	3,824	Elected		14	16		16		15
Ton de Kok	375	Replacement					20		
Ger Koopmans	618							29	
Jan Krajenbrink	169	Elected, but declined				16			
H.J. van Kuijk-Blommestein	1,922							17	
Frouwke Laning-Boersema	3,704	Elected			10		10		10
Ad Lansink	921	Elected		9					
C.H.J.M. Lebens	3,568							20	
Arie van der Lee	989	Elected, but declined			20				
Gerd Leers	205	Elected	17						
Johan de Leeuw	189	Elected				12			
Gerard van Leijenhorst	991	Elected		13	14				
René van der Linden	34,794	Elected						9	
Wim Mateman	1,947	Elected		11					
H.J. Mes	78				26				
G.C.A. de Mooij	450			30					
H.J. Morssink	312								30
Nel Mulder-van Dam	551	Replacement							19
L. Nederhoed-Zijlstra	113							28	
J.J.C.M. Niesten	821							30	
Netty van den Nieuwboer-Langenkamp	665			25					
C.C.L.M. van Nieuwenhuijzen-Bovée	261		27						
Jan Nijland	485	Elected, but declined							13
L.J.J. van Nistelrooij	659		21						
Jan van Noord	355	Elected							12
J. Nuijt-Verschoor	268					24			
Marleen de Pater-van der Meer	186			26					
Walter Paulis	2,084	Elected						12	
Minke van der Ploeg-Posthumus	569	Replacement							21
Ram Ramlal	379	Replacement				20			
Jacob Reitsma	533	Elected		16					
H.M.L. Remijn-de Badts	157							22	
Roel Robbertsen	157						25		
J. van Rooijen	203							25	
Riet Roosen-van Pelt	1,171	Elected	14						
M.G.J. van der Sanden-Holthuizen	345		22						
J.P. de Savornin Lohman	92					29			
Hajé Schartman	744	Elected		12					
Y. Schram	151		24						
A. Slob	176				27				
J.C.J. Smallenbroek	79						26		
Ries Smits	37	Elected			18				
Marian Soutendijk-van Appeldoorn	1,973	Elected	9		11				
J.J. Stavast	221								28
T.P. van der Stoep	56					26			
Haty Tegelaar-Boonacker	937	Elected		17	17				
Gerrit Terpstra	737	Elected					17		
Klaas Tuinstra	536	Replacement							17
E.L. Veerman	192								29
J.J.A.G. van der Velden	684							19	
F.P.A.M. van de Ven-van Lee	320		29						
J. Vink	224					30			
G.M. Visser-Mous	142								26
Thijs van Vlijmen	189	Elected					13		
G.Chr. Voerman	249			24					
Berend-Jan van Voorst tot Voorst	330	Elected				9			
Tom Vreugdenhil	181	Replacement				18			
Yvonne Vriens-Auerbach	391	Elected	16						
Klaas de Vries	88				24				
J. Vroegindeweij	227						29		
H.J. Walch	112						27		
Bert Westerink	238								23
Ans Willemse-van der Ploeg	788	Replacement					22		
Frans Wolters	4,446	Elected						10	
Rob van der Zwaag	502							27	
A.W.M. de Zwart	127		23						

== 2: Labour Party ==
Candidate list for the Labour Party
Number	Candidate	Votes	Result
1	Wim Kok	2,623,175	Elected
2-30	Regional candidates		

=== Regional candidates (Labour Party) ===
==== 's-Hertogenbosch ====
Regional candidates for PvdA in electoral district 's-Hertogenbosch
Position	Candidate	Votes	Result
2	Bram Stemerdink	1,970	Elected
3	Jan Achttienribbe-Buijs	1,418	Elected
4	Dick de Cloe	522	Elected
5	Jan van Zijl	153	
6	Greet Dam-van der Molen	2,498	
7	Pierre van Kleef	162	
8	Sheila Rodrigues Loopes	789	
9	Owen Venloo	67	
10	Jan Nico Scholten	433	
11	Jan Jetten	114	
12	Arnold van den Wollenberg	199	
13	Henk Jagersma	120	
14	Wim Stoppelenburg	386	
15	Henk Smeets	159	
16	Frits Castricum	81	
17	Frits Niessen	54	
18	Joost Kant	149	
19	Gezien Reinders	114	
20	Jan Zwikker	53	
21	Willem Vermeend	134	
22	Willemien Timmermans-van der Wal	396	
23	Albert Scheerder	242	
24	Thijs Wöltgens	89	
25	Elske ter Veld	306	
26	Wil van der Weide	198	
27	Eveline Herfkens	97	
28	Secil Arda	34	
29	Lini Hake-van Ravesteyn	91	
30	Thanasis Apostolou	146	

==== Tilburg ====
Regional candidates for PvdA in electoral district Tilburg
Position	Candidate	Votes	Result
2	Frits Castricum	1,079	Elected
3	Frits Niessen	513	Elected
4	Josephine Verspaget	2,818	
5	Mieke van der Burg	410	
6	Frouke Stoeckart-van Dijk	114	
7	Dick Bisschop	827	
8	Tineke van Dam-Boot	380	
9	Rita Barto-van Wijngaarden	195	
10	Owen Venloo	38	
11	Henk Jagersma	49	
12	Piet Kruizinga	21	
13	Peter Martens	120	
14	Mariëlle Lauwen	125	
15	Cor Jonkergouw	322	
16	Bram Stemerdink	45	
17	Dick de Cloe	52	
18	Renee Erich-Vermee	190	
19	Jacques Costongs	122	
20	Francien Bogmans	77	
21	Ad Jansen	80	
22	Elly Pastoors	148	
23	Kees Bakx	120	
24	Greet Ermen	230	
25	Jos van de Sande	109	
26	Ineke Haas-Berger	74	
27	Hans Krosse	132	
28	Elske ter Veld	138	
29	Eveline Herfkens	72	
30	Rein Welschen	390	

==== Arnhem, Nijmegen, Lelystad ====
Regional candidates for PvdA in electoral districts Arnhem, Nijmegen and Lelystad
Position	Candidate	Votes	Result
2	Hans Alders	2,681	Elected
3	Eveline Herfkens	9,279	Elected
4	Frans Leijnse	260	Elected
5	Maarten van Traa	289	Elected
6	Margo Vliegenthart	889	Elected
7	Ad Melkert	442	
8	Jaap-Jelle Feenstra	225	
9	Joke Kersten	585	
10	Wim Scheerder	446	
11	Elske ter Veld	943	
12	Dick Dolman	642	
13	Corry Verhulst	700	
14	Willemien Ruygrok	642	
15	Henk Jagersma	53	
16	Erik Jurgens	75	
17	Geke Buwalda Buenk	153	
18	Chris Peeters	171	
19	Jaap Modder	275	
20	Secil Arda	140	
21	Piet Bijl	243	
22	Jacques Thielen	133	
23	Joukje van den Berg-Otter	213	
24	Jan van Zijl	27	
25	Willemien Penterman	252	
26	Dick Tiemens	426	
27	Jim Lopulalan	284	
28	Emmy Witbraad-Wiltink	305	
29	William Lelieveldt	120	
30	Harry Keereweer	376	

===== Rotterdam =====
Regional candidates for PvdA in electoral district Rotterdam
Position	Candidate	Votes	Result
2	Hans Kombrink	3,080	Elected
3	Frans Moor	255	
4	Piet de Visser	879	
5	Nelly Kukler	1,225	
6	Erik Peter van Heemst	188	
7	Ruud van Middelkoop	230	
8	Ernst Kleisterlee	137	
9	Frouke Stoeckart-van Dijk	767	
10	Wim Vleugels	117	
11	Rob Beek	101	
12	Gerard Peet	109	
13	Marianne Schuurs	666	
14	Harry Sieljes	20	
15	Kees Marges	127	
16	Leni van Rijn-Vellekoop	90	
17	Jeltje van Nieuwenhoven	156	
18	Theo Meuwese	26	
19	Elske ter Veld	233	
20	Maarten van Traa	19	
21	Tineke Netelenbos-Koomen	38	
22	Henk Oedairam	473	
23	Willem Vermeend	98	
24	Ineke Haas Berger	82	
25	Koos van der Vaart	10	
26	Eveline Herfkens	86	
27	Jan Pronk	47	
28	Dick Dolman	222	

==== 's-Gravenhage ====
Regional candidates for PvdA in electoral district 's-Gravenhage
Position	Candidate	Votes	Result
2	Gerrit Jan van Otterloo	1,195	
3	Nelly Kukler	1,409	
4	Ella Kalsbeek	234	
5	Mient Jan Faber	439	
6	Johan Chandoe	987	
7	Wobbie Plemper-Veltman	58	
8	Paul Klink	131	
9	Piet Kruizinga	25	
10	Willemien Ruygrok	249	
11	Jaap Huurman	120	
12	Jeltje van Nieuwenhoven	199	
13	Henk Jagersma	11	
14	Jan Pronk	69	
15	Willem Vermeend	103	
16	Frans Moor	19	
17	Erik Jurgens	14	
18	Elske ter Veld	273	
19	Thijs Wöltgens	44	
20	Hans Kombrink	83	
21	Harry Sieljes	18	
22	Ineke Haas-Berger	80	
23	Tineke Netelenbos-Koomen	24	
24	Piet de Visser	41	
25	Tineke Witteveen-Hevinga	26	
26	Eveline Herfkens	122	
27	Willie Swildens-Rozendaal	23	
28	Frans Leijnse	10	
29	Dick Dolman	262	

===== Leiden, Dordrecht =====
Regional candidates for PvdA in electoral districts Leiden and Dordrecht
Position	Candidate	Votes	Result
2	Dick Dolman	3,902	Elected
3	Willem Vermeend	1,361	Elected
4	Leni van Rijn-Vellekoop	6,011	Elected
5	Koos van der Vaart	229	Elected
6	Ella Kalsbeek	1,778	Elected
7	Leo Schoots	645	
8	Arie de Jong	295	
9	Nelly Kukler	725	
10	Elly de Jeu	512	
11	Kees Oskam	272	
12	Erik Peter van Heemst	199	
13	Harry Sieljes	191	
14	Tineke Dekkinga	459	
15	Boudewijn Bruil	114	
16	Inge Visser-Drost	335	
17	Arend Ketting	319	
18	Guus te Wechel	70	
19	Auke de Vries	161	
20	Nico Lamers	175	
21	John Ranshuijsen	260	
22	Johan Chandoe	359	
23	Kees van der Zalm	78	
24	Ruud de Vries	113	
25	Sjan van Halteren	104	
26	Johan van Workum	47	
27	Henk Letschert	48	
28	Vincent Gerris	81	
29	Elske ter Veld	1,323	
30	Wijnie Jabaaij	786	

==== Amsterdam ====
Regional candidates for PvdA in electoral district Amsterdam
Position	Candidate	Votes	Result
2	Jan Schaefer	1,959	Elected
3	Jeltje van Nieuwenhoven	6,881	Elected
4	Rob van Gijzel	317	
5	Erik Jurgens	362	
6	Annet de Waart-Bakker	2,640	
7	Dick Benschop	122	
8	Leo Balai	368	
9	Willie Swildens-Rozendaal	193	
10	Coos Huijsen	164	
11	Bert Koenders	64	
12	Joyce Overdijk-Francis	280	
13	Laurens Slot	97	
14	Adriaan Wirtz	17	
15	Wobbie Plemper-Veltman	72	
16	Janherman Veenker	226	
17	Ineke van der Storm	135	
18	Harry Sieljes	29	
19	Joke van Unen	315	
20	Henk Jagersma	14	
21	Piet Kruizinga	11	
22	Dick Dolman	275	
23	Eveline Herfkens	376	
24	Maarten van Traa	185	
25	Jan Pronk	177	
26	Thijs Wöltgens	128	
27	Ad Melkert	36	
28	Ineke Haas-Berger	348	
29	Willem Vermeend	256	
30	Elske ter Veld	862	

==== Den Helder ====
Regional candidates for PvdA in electoral district Den Helder
Position	Candidate	Votes	Result
2	Aad Kosto	977	Elected
3	Henk Vos	569	Elected
4	Willie Swildens-Rozendaal	2,446	
5	Gerrit Valk	418	
6	Leni Jansen-van der Gevel	1,032	
7	Margreet Horselenberg-Koomen	983	
8	Owen Venloo	62	
9	Cees Bijl	547	
10	Chrisla Posthuma-de Bruin	255	
11	Jan van Eeden	324	
12	Dirk Dekker	98	
13	Joan van Baarle	103	
14	Walter Hooghiemstra	98	
15	Eveline Herfkens	267	
16	Roel Kingma	45	
17	Elske ter Veld	349	
18	Jan Postma	93	
19	Jeltje van Nieuwenhoven	301	
20	Thom Groothuis	201	
21	Caty Bartstra-Odenkirchen	99	
22	Rolf Oosterbaan	50	
23	Dineke Harmsen-Brugge	208	
24	Dick Dolman	126	
25	Janny Sandstra-Loots	77	
26	Bram Stemerdink	21	
27	Julia Wennekes	78	
28	Willem Vermeend	125	
29	Helga Lelieveld	171	
30	Jan Pronk	105	

==== Haarlem ====
Regional candidates for PvdA in electoral district Haarlem
Position	Candidate	Votes	Result
2	Piet Stoffelen	567	Elected
3	Tineke Netelenbos-Koomen	4,298	
4	Joyce Overdijk-Francis	649	
5	Wobbie Plemper-Veltman	390	
6	Steven Dijk	265	
7	Marcel Kampers	254	
8	Ineke van der Storm	314	
9	Jesse Flink	122	
10	Coos Huijsen	77	
11	Elisabeth Goedhart	185	
12	Joachim Driessen	75	
13	Nel Griffioen-Smit	136	
14	Jan van Wensveen	158	
15	Bert van Brakel	37	
16	Willie Swildens-Rozendaal	43	
17	Ineke Haas-Berger	208	
18	Jeltje van Nieuwenhoven	353	
19	Willem Vermeend	164	
20	Willemien Ruygrok	327	
21	Ilonka de Lange	77	
22	Eveline Herfkens	144	
23	Jan-Evert Keman	42	
24	Erik Boshuijzen	40	
25	Owen Venloo	92	
26	Henk Wooldrik	40	
27	Elske ter Veld	218	
28	Douwe van Dam	65	
29	Marijke Drees	450	
30	Dick Dolman	318	

==== Middelburg ====
Regional candidates for PvdA in electoral district Middelburg
Position	Candidate	Votes	Result
2	John Lilipaly	1,828	
3	Tjeu Strous	239	
4	Elske ter Veld	610	
5	Martha Blom	451	
6	Frits Castricum	31	
7	Toine Huijsmans	322	
8	Jeltje van Nieuwenhoven	83	
9	Piet Hamelink	57	
10	Pieter Vollaard	156	
11	Thijs Wöltgens	29	
12	Hans Alders	6	
13	Relus ter Beek	11	
14	Willem Vermeend	41	
15	Dick Dolman	33	
16	Eveline Herfkens	43	
17	Bram Stemerdink	8	
18	Frits Niessen	4	
19	Irene Sandel	16	
20	Jan Nico Scholten	27	
21	Hans Krombrink	22	
22	Owen Venloo	0	
23	Jan Pronk	6	
24	Maarten van Traa	5	
25	Bonno Spieker	3	
26	Flip Buurmeijer	2	
27	Jan Schaefer	26	
28	Tineke Netelenbos-Koomen	30	
29	Frans Leijnse	23	

==== Utrecht ====
Regional candidates for PvdA in electoral district Utrecht
Position	Candidate	Votes	Result
2	Elske ter Veld	8,167	Elected
3	Wim van Gelder	562	Elected
4	Thanasis Apostolou	566	
5	Mieke van der Burg	1,756	
6	Ab Engelsman	110	
7	Wil Voogt	161	
8	Joyce Overdijk-Francis	161	
9	Livia Lankreijer-van Eijle	117	
10	Piet van Baal	67	
11	Irene Sandel	100	
12	Cor van Liempde	94	
13	Piet Kruizinga	75	
14	Hennie van Beek	137	
15	Marka Spit	110	
16	Nelleke Wuurman	163	
17	Marius Guichelaar	88	
18	Özden Kutluer-Yalim	207	
19	Frans van Hellemondt	51	
20	Wim Hart	35	
21	Eiga Schenk-Klein Kranenbarg	93	
22	Willy Wagenmans	36	
23	Ruth Friedländer	67	
24	Peter de Klerk	59	
25	Ella Kalsbeek-Jasperse	30	
26	Margo Vliegenthart	99	
27	Jaap Jelle Feenstra	40	
28	José Hageman	93	
29	James van Lidth de Jeude	197	
30	Fons Asselbergs	241	

==== Leeuwarden ====
Regional candidates for PvdA in electoral district Leeuwarden
Position	Candidate	Votes	Result
2	Kees Zijlstra	1,642	Elected
3	Wilfried de Pree	741	Elected
4	Joop van den Berg	776	
5	Sjoukje Akkerman	3,091	
6	Annet van der Hoek	832	
7	Bertus Mulder	119	
8	Jikke Schaafstal-Cuperus	161	
9	Jan Metzlar	225	
10	Wietze de Haan	134	
11	Bareld de Vries	134	
12	Esther Roosen	336	
13	Sicko Heldoorn	125	
14	Gerrit Leune	112	
15	Annie Welles-Jongedijk	115	
16	Jan Frieswijk	70	
17	Frans Bouwers	30	
18	Bert Versteeg	60	
19	Piet Mandemaker	44	
20	Hessel Kramer	26	
21	Johanneke Liemburg	221	
22	Jaap Scheltens	73	
23	Rita van Gelder	60	
24	Egbert Otter	72	
25	Nanke Terpstra-Hartsuyker	75	
26	Tjebbe Hettinga	63	
27	Grytsje Durkstra	125	
28	Jeltje van Nieuwenhoven	175	
29	Willem Vermeend	52	
30	Dick Dolman	144	

==== Zwolle ====
Regional candidates for PvdA in electoral district Zwolle
Position	Candidate	Votes	Result
2	Flip Buurmeijer	1,580	Elected
3	Jan Lonink	1,121	Elected
4	Jacqueline Beijlen-Geerts	2,479	
5	Dineke Brons	1,691	
6	Janna Stegink-van Olst	580	
7	Bert Koenders	79	
8	Harry Sieljes	52	
9	Peter de Noord	232	
10	Eric Helder	312	
11	Ingrid Petiet	430	
12	Aase Domela Nieuwenhuis	160	
13	Bernard Ziel	122	
14	Jan Altena	222	
15	Marian ter Velde-Willighagen	416	
16	Henk Jagersma	13	
17	Owen Venloo	11	
18	Jaap Perlot	76	
19	Ruud Zuidhoek	174	
20	Irene Sandel	40	
21	Rien Mertens	89	
22	Johan Chandoe	37	
23	Tineke Witteveen-Hevinga	61	
24	Pieter Grondel	121	
25	Elske ter Veld	220	
26	Willem Vermeend	109	
27	Frans Leijnse	15	
28	Hans Alders	59	

==== Groningen ====
Regional candidates for PvdA in electoral district Groningen
Position	Candidate	Votes	Result
2	Ineke Haas-Berger	5,197	Elected
3	Jacques Wallage	760	Elected
4	Bonno Spieker	439	
5	Martin Zijlstra	345	
6	Mariet Witkamp-Ockels	665	
7	Piet Boekhoudt	190	
8	Gerard Beukema	441	
9	Rein Zunderdorp	460	
10	Rineke Klijnsma	574	
11	Gerben Poortinga	84	
12	Anneke Walsma	362	
13	Maarten van Traa	46	
14	Elske ter Veld	335	
15	Hans Kombrink	101	
16	Gerrit van Werven	80	
17	Walfred Haans	64	
18	Mirjam de Meijer	74	
19	Ireen Folkerts-van Delea	63	
20	Berend Kingma	51	
21	Jan Dobma	140	
22	Ed van Eijbergen	37	
23	Gerda Bosma	123	
24	Gert van den Bremen	98	
25	Brita Thieme-Domela Nieuwenhuis Nijegaard	72	
26	Jan Köller	33	
27	Ria Meijvogel	115	
28	Teun Jan Zanen	42	
29	Hans Mobers	162	
30	Piet Huisman	193	

==== Assen ====
Regional candidates for PvdA in electoral district Assen
Position	Candidate	Votes	Result
2	Relus ter Beek	1,607	Elected
3	Tineke Witteveen-Hevinga	2,246	
4	Bert Middel	238	
5	Harry Sieljes	62	
6	Lies van Urk	1,059	
7	Elske ter Veld	365	
8	Jim Lopulalan	102	
9	Willem Vermeend	89	
10	Dineke van As-Kleywegt	463	
11	Jan van Dalen	70	
12	Ineke Haas-Berger	177	
13	Hans Schaap	109	
14	Flip Buurmeijer	24	
15	Anja Kuijper	154	
16	Hans Kombrink	39	
17	Henk Weggemans	156	
18	Kees Zijlstra	31	
19	Janneke Harmsma	170	
20	Jeltje van Nieuwenhoven	62	
21	Ab Haak	121	
22	Ad Melkert	22	
23	Thijs Wöltgens	10	
24	Geesje Lokhorst-Weggemans	177	
25	Jan Pronk	22	
26	Frans Westenbrink	195	
27	Tineke Netelenbos-Koomen	20	
28	Aaldert Duiven	49	
29	Meent van der Sluis	127	
30	Frans Leijnse	30	

==== Maastricht ====
Regional candidates for PvdA in electoral district Maastricht
Position	Candidate	Votes	Result
2	Thijs Wöltgens	9,659	Elected
3	Jan Pronk	2,309	Elected
4	Servaas Huys	1,183	Elected
5	Marianne Ruigrok-Verreijt	6,764	
6	Monique Quint-Maagdenberg	1,300	
7	Rein Hummel	7,347	
8	Henk Opsteegh	626	
9	Jan Reerink	463	
10	Andre Bloemers	743	
11	Vera van Piggelen-Schwerzel	300	
12	Albert Veenendaal	831	
13	Lies Koolen-Peeters	234	
14	Eef Kogeldans-Pinas	369	
15	Gerard Peters	481	
16	Jessie Koene-Pijpers	343	
17	Wil Paes	1,026	
18	Helen Jägers	277	
19	Martin Nooijens	198	
20	John van Dijk	607	
21	Dorien Tobi-Visser	331	
22	Fons Tans	111	
23	Thei Gybels	1,220	
24	Wilma Adriaans	396	
25	Odile Wolfs	188	
26	Anis Haidar	136	
27	Mia Ebbelink-Eikenboom	609	
28	Henk Willems	170	
29	Andre Coumans	534	
30	Jan Tindemans	472	

== 3: People's Party for Freedom and Democracy ==
Candidate list for People's Party for Freedom and Democracy (VVD)
Position	Candidate	Votes	Result
1	Joris Voorhoeve	1,004,263	
2-5	Regional candidates		
6	Benk Korthals	11,307	
7	Broos van Erp	4,139	
8	Margreet Kamp	8,901	
9	Jan Dirk Blaauw	3,401	
10	Len Rempt	4,193	
11	Jos van Rey	15,053	
12	Herman Lauxtermann	788	
13	Johan Remkes	2,382	
14	Paul Labohm	1,328	
15	H.A.L. van Hoof	1,048	
16	Nellie Verbugt	2,505	
17	Ruud Luchtenveld	532	
18	Norbert Klein	499	
19	J.K. Muntinga	882	
20	Els de Graaff-van Meeteren	1,703	
21	Peter Neeb	545	
22	Wilibrord van Beek	460	
23	Sylvia Brilstra-Oosterhuis	1,117	
24	H. Brummel	815	
25-30	Regional candidates		
Total			

== 4: Democrats 66 ==
Candidate list for Democrats 66
Position	Candidate	Votes	Result
1	Hans van Mierlo	632,725	Elected
2	Gerrit Jan Wolffensperger	9,560	Elected
3	Jacob Kohnstamm	2,118	Elected
4	Louise Groenman	30,594	Elected
5	Dick Tommel	1,998	Elected
6	Aad Nuis	1,308	Elected
7	Doeke Eisma	1,132	Elected
8	Olga Scheltema-de Nie	5,697	Elected
9	Arthie Schimmel	1,423	Elected
10	Pieter ter Veer	923	Elected
11	Machteld Versnel-Schmitz	1,839	Elected
12	Gerrit Ybema	1,978	Elected
13	Pex Langenberg	308	
14	Thom de Graaf	421	
15	Nicky van 't Riet	1,014	
16	Ernst Bakker	272	
17	Hanneke Combee-van Geuns	934	
18	Marjolijn de Nijs-van den Berg	1,227	
19	Paul Wessels	871	
20	Hans Jeekel	132	
21	Henk Giebels	287	
22	Joke Jorritsma-van Oosten	562	
23	Jan van der Veen	795	
24	Leo de Graaf	105	
25	Petra Nypels	788	
26	Thea Horsmans	121	
27	Peter Claessen	303	
28	Lisette Tiddens	388	
29	Carien Evenhuis	433	
30	Leontien Helfferich-van der Kley	1,678	
Total			

== 5: Reformed Political Party ==
Candidate list for the Reformed Political Party
Number	Candidate	Votes	Result
1	Bas van der Vlies	156,668	Elected
2	Cor van Dis	1,601	Elected
3	Koos van den Berg	1,096	Elected
4	Bert Scholten	1,919	
5	Gerrit Holdijk	549	
6	P.H.D. van Ree	246	
7	Gert van den Berg	380	
8	Driekus Barendregt	202	
9	C. Boonzaaijer	100	
10	J.H. Wolterink	160	
11	C.S.L. Janse	54	
12	L. Bolier	111	
13	J. Dankers	172	
14	Leen van der Waal	220	
15	S. de Jong	345	
16	W.Chr. Hovius	424	
17	W. Bron	96	
18	W. Pieters	532	
19	N. Verdouw	121	
20	K. van der Plas	108	
21	Mark Markusse	55	
22	P.C. den Uil	100	
23	Rinus Houtman	104	
24	J.A. Coster	27	
25	M. Burggraaf	147	
26	W. Nagtegaal	60	
27	M.C. Tanis	203	
28	George van Heukelom	79	
29	B. Stolk	66	
30	A.K. van der Staaij	137	

== 6: GreenLeft ==
Candidate list for GreenLeft
Position	Candidate	Votes	Result
1	Ria Beckers	191,683	Elected
2	Andrée van Es	73,750	Elected
3	Ina Brouwer	30,746	Elected
4	Paul Rosenmöller	21,820	Elected
5	Peter Lankhorst	4,907	Elected
6	Wilbert Willems	1,766	Elected
7	Bram van Ojik	633	Replacement
8	Marius Ernsting	1,010	
9	Ellin Robles	8,851	
10	Leoni Sipkes	1,073	Replacement
11	Cor Ofman	7,656	
12	Wim de Boer	542	
13	Tara Oedayraj Singh Varma	2,642	
14	Maarten van Poelgeest	4,259	
15	Marion van Leeuwen	794	
16	Bob van Schijndel	1,797	
17	Geert Lameris		
18	Astrid Roemer	1,953	
19	Leo Platvoet	477	
20	Tineke van den Klinkenberg	289	
21	Anneke de Jong	406	
22	Miny Wolterink-ten Den	148	
23	Marijke Vos	412	
24	Jan Berghuis	190	
25	Hein Albeda	138	
26	Annelies Schutte	233	
27	Rudi van Dantzig	969	
28	Janneke van der Plaat-Luppes	276	
29	Henk Branderhorst	210	
30	Jeannette van Beuzekom	1,395	
Total		362,304	

== 7: Reformed Political League ==
Candidate list for Reformed Political League
Position	Candidate	Votes	Result
1	Gert Schutte	105,558	Elected
2	Eimert van Middelkoop	1,349	Elected
3	Hans Blokland	205	
4	M.P.H. van Haeften	125	
5	S.J.C. Cnossen	70	
6	M. Wilcke-van der Linden	726	
7	S. de Vries	224	
8	Bert Groen	92	
9	Jurn de Vries	85	
10	Jan Geersing	67	
11	K. Dikkema	43	
12	Th. Haasdijk	33	
13	H. Timmermans	40	
14	M. Hendriks-Stoorvogel	81	
15	Remmelt de Boer	49	
16	W. Haitsma	37	
17	A.T. Kamsteeg	122	
18	P. Jonkman	19	
19	A. van Herwijnen	62	
20	P. Dijkstra	65	
21	J. Lagendijk	50	
22	H.H. Sietsma	20	
23	Joop Alssema	23	
24	J.M. Nieboer-Buitinga	46	
25	A.H. Poelman	26	
26	J.M.A. Boerma-Buurman	52	
27	P. Roose	38	
28	P. de Putter	23	
29	L. Tijssen	92	
30	W. Hoekstra	215	
Total			

== 8: Reformatory Political Federation ==
Candidate list for Reformatory Political Federation
Position	Candidate	Votes	Result
1	Meindert Leerling	75,245	Elected
2	N.C. van Velzen	2,867	
3	Ad de Boer	1,026	
4	Andries Knevel	427	
5	J.H. ten Hove	305	
6	A.B.F. Hoek-van Kooten	1,194	
7	André Rouvoet	136	
8	Egbert Schuurman	607	
9	Johan Frinsel	1,661	
10	G.P.A. Beukema	127	
11	Rijk van Dam	62	
12	Jan Rietkerk	180	
13	A.W. Biersteker	108	
14	P. Langeler	88	
15	J. Heetebrij	63	
16	A. Kadijk	68	
17	C.J. Smits	54	
18	M. Verhage-van Kooten	58	
19	S.O. Voogt	122	
20	Dick Schutte	186	
21-30	Regional candidates		
Total			

=== Regional candidates (RPF) ===
==== Middelburg (RPF) ====
Regional candidates for Reformatory Political Federation
Position	Candidate	Votes	Result
21	Leen van Dijke	11	
22	P. van Belzen	26	
23	L.M. Luitwieler	6	
24	T.W. van Bennekom	30	
25	W. Mol	1	
26	J. de Bruyne	4	
27	T. Elzinga	11	
28	B.J. van Belzen	3	
29	J. Marinissen	6	
30	C.J. Leunis	52	

==== Everywhere except Middelburg (RPF) ====
Regional candidates for Reformatory Political Federation
Position	Candidate	Votes	Result
21	J.H. van Bemmel	48	
22	C.A.E. de Jonge	68	
23	G.E. Rietveld-de Vries	34	
24	Henk Jochemsen	52	
25	A.H. de Jongh	27	
26	P.J.A. Burghout-van den Heuvel	26	
27	Leen van Dijke	12	
28	Henk Visser	48	
29	L. Zandbergen-Kok	57	
30	Dick Stellingwerf	125	

== 9: League of Communists in the Netherlands ==
Candidate list for League of Communists in the Netherlands
Position	Candidate	Votes	Result
1	Rinze Visser	5,465	
2	Corry Westgeest	189	
3	Rie Honselaar-Nordholt	143	
4	Joop Spek	215	
5	Tom Boekman	53	
6	Jasper Schaaf	72	
7	Cor Ronner	78	
8	Wim Klinkenberg	129	
9	Wim Smit	98	
10	Wil de Graaff	71	
11	Chris Horselenberg	58	
12	Jan van de Meulenhof	42	
13	Co van Tongeren	17	
14	Jan Nieuwenhuijse	64	
15	Trijnie Ahlers-Luppens	340	
16	Tonnie Kruizenga	25	
17	Baap van Egmond	20	
18	Paul Magnée	20	
19	Wouter Rietveld	10	
20	Ries Adriaansen	21	
21	Margreeth van Dijk	20	
22	Piet Schouten	37	
23	Servie l' Espoir	28	
24	Wolter van der Veen	9	
25	Sipke de Wit	14	
26	Elzo Wiebrands	18	
27	Ton Paardekooper	19	
28	Andries Dijkstra	14	
29	Toon van Kampen	18	
30	Tineke Veltman-Stienstra	73	
Total			

== 11: Milieu Defensie Partij 2000+ ==
Candidate list for Milieu Defensie Partij 2000+
Position	Candidate	Votes	Result
1	John Gouweloos	98	
2	Désirée Stahlecker	12	
3	Johan Bierman	6	
4	Monique Koenen-van Zwet	1	
5	Barend Zuurmond	2	
6	Eva Ruiter	2	
7	Harro Spoelstra	1	
8	Astrid Lindenhof	1	
9	Rene van Toor	1	
10	Dorien Bakker	4	
11	Gerard van der Garde	0	
12	Els Glorius	3	
13	Robert André Maxime Voorhoeve	2	
14	Marjolijn Hoeve-van Hees	1	
15	Jan de Bruyne	0	
16	Joke de Haan	3	
17	Piet Roeleveld	0	
18	Louise Staurder	1	
19	John Haverkate	0	
20	Oswalda Spoelstra	0	
21	Jan van der Voort	1	
22	Annie Middendorp	5	
23	Erik Kabelar	0	
24	Maria Boersma-Salm	0	
25	Wil Raat	1	
26	Marie Guit-Prikaska	1	
27	Meindert Pompen	2	
Total			

== 12: Partij Democratisch Socialisten ==
Candidate list for Partij Democratisch Socialisten
Position	Candidate	Votes	Result
1	Robbie Wormer	378	
2	Floris Michiels van Kessenich	28	
3	Jozef Chocolaad	13	
4	Cornelis Marijs	6	
5	Gerardus Lalleman	8	
6	Hadjirakhatoen Soebratie	19	
Total			

== 13: Realisten Nederland ==
Candidate list for Realisten Nederland
Position	Candidate	Votes	Result
1	J. Jensema-Vos	5,062	
2	J.A.M. van Baal	129	
3	N.J. de Jong	77	
4	C. Haverhoek	45	
5	J.H. van Toen	47	
6	M.K. af Schultén-Elsas	75	
7	H.T. van Thiel Berghuijs	65	
8	J. Mach-Vries	41	
9	G.M.T. Gutlich-Appelman	76	
10	C. ten Napel	69	
11	W. Dijkstra	41	
12	C. Smolders	16	
13	P. Kleinepier	70	
14	G. Pijlman	38	
15	F. van Dijk	67	
16	A. de Vries	50	
17	J. Weisel	79	
Total			

== 14: Anti Werkloosheid Partij ==
Candidate list for Anti Werkloosheid Partij
Position	Candidate	Votes	Result
1	Albert Wissink	1,619	
2	Nico van Beem	109	
3	Dick Schakelaar	83	
4	Ariëtta Timmerman-Smit	82	
5	Harry Dundas	65	
6	Piet Swart	61	
7	J. Cupery	152	
Total			

== 15: Bejaarden Centraal ==
Candidate list for Bejaarden Centraal
Position	Candidate	Votes	Result
1	H.W. Pullens	6,816	
2	H. Haffert	249	
3	C.J.C. Jakma-Schnabel	163	
4	C.A.M. Bode	89	
5	P.P.A. Roctus	85	
6	R. Carrière	148	
7	H.W. Kramers	42	
8	P.J.M. van der Waart	43	
9	J.W. Kingma	85	
10	A.H. Haffert-Mulder	164	
Total			

== 16: Vrouwenpartij ==
Candidate list for Vrouwenpartij
Position	Candidate	Votes	Result
1	Nel Roggeband-Baaij	8,140	
2	Nel Wellekens	806	
3	Betty Nahon	406	
4	Elizabeth Schadee-Hartree	368	
5	Chandra Ramdoelare Panday-Ori	179	
6	Conny Henny e/v Blaauw	109	
7	Emmy Deira	140	
8	Ineke Veldhuis	117	
9	Lottie Schenk-de Jong	155	
10	Wietske Kuipers e/v Planje	132	
11	Patrice van de Vorst	80	
12	Marga Doodeman	198	
13	Trees Lambregts-Brautigam	90	
14	Lee de Haan w/v Klunder	48	
15	Rixt Rijpkema	63	
16	Jeanne van der Velden	96	
17	Hanny Wilgehof-Tretmans	73	
18	Els Lalk	42	
19	Sylvie Lohlefink-Zuhorn	56	
20	Janneke Fey	92	
21	Anna Lont	73	
22	Cecile Crutzen	133	
23	Els Brouwer	125	
24	Ger ter Schiphorst-Mannak	17	
25	Joyce Ronkes Agerbeek e/v Stokkink	51	
26	Ted Raaijmakers	19	
27	Jophien van Vaalen	59	
28	Elke Dijkhuis	43	
29	Erna Wasch	28	
30	Anke van Geel	191	
Total			

== 17: Socialistische Minderheden Partij ==
Candidate list for Socialistische Minderheden Partij
Position	Candidate	Votes	Result
1	Chandrikapersad Mahabier	329	
Total			

== 18: Centre Democrats ==
Candidate list for Centre Democrats
Position	Candidate	Votes	Result
1	Hans Janmaat	76,484	
2	Wil Schuurman	1,286	
3	M. Koning	384	
4	Wim Bruyn	467	
5	Wim Elsthout	104	
6	Wim Vreeswijk	254	
7	F. Castermans	355	
8	R.W. Dekkers	241	
9	Th.Q.M. Lubbers	342	
10	J. Morren	96	
11	R.C. Sangster	65	
12	G.F. Rieff	183	
13	D. de Vos	74	
14	A.F. Honing	36	
15	N.J. Winkelman	21	
16	C.C.G. Poetiray	56	
17	J. van Prooijen	81	
18	F. Hofman	75	
19	B. Hubbers geb. de Boer	44	
20	B. Sluijter	40	
21	M.J. van 't Ende	82	
22	H.A.W. Dekkers	151	
23	P.J. van Hulst	75	
24	J. van Rijswijk	28	
25	J. Groeneweg	82	
26	J.C. Meijer	19	
27	M.C. Bosman geb. Galis	34	
28	R. Snijders	29	
29	M. Spanjersberg	87	
30	E.Ch. Karselius	152	
Total			

== 19: The Greens ==
Candidate list for The Greens
Position	Candidate	Votes	Result
1	Roel van Duijn	24,785	
2	Bart Kuiper	589	
3	Marten Bierman	423	
4	Margje Vlasveld	1,446	
5	Bertram Bouthoorn	104	
6	Frans Eppink	281	
7	Aga Veltman	196	
8	Edithe Boeke-de Clercq Zubli	996	
9	Friel de Smeth	111	
10	Hans Ramaer	292	
11	Maarten Ruarus	117	
12	Jelle Theunisz	72	
13	Jelle van der Meulen	172	
14	Joke Siepman-de Boef	107	
15	Jannie Möller	176	
16	Kees Noltee	86	
17	Michel Jehae	102	
18	Jos Kamphuys	59	
19	Jan Hopmans	92	
20	Carla Seelemeijer	136	
21	Jan Boerstoel	61	
22	Ine van den Einde-Landzaad	81	
23	Jan-Hendrik Bennik	50	
24	Hans van Essen	43	
25	Jaap van der Rest	53	
26	Jan van der Meer	36	
27	Rob Wiewel	54	
28	Joep Bevers	55	
30	Cor Aakster	441	
Total			

== 21: Vooruitstrevende Minderheden Partij ==
Candidate list for Vooruitstrevende Minderheden Partij
Position	Candidate	Votes	Result
1	Fred Kartaram	1,942	
Total			

== 23: Socialist Workers Party ==
Candidate list for Socialist Workers Party
Position	Candidate	Votes	Result
1	Harrie Lindelauff	2,295	
2	Rienke Schutte	202	
3	Wineke t Hart	118	
4	Jan Viola	78	
5	Lot van Baaren	60	
6	Frans van der Vlugt	34	
7	Karin Vos geb. Schuurman	38	
8	Ernst van Lohuizen	30	
9	Sabine Kraus	44	
10	Patrick van der Voort	34	
11	Claudia Teunissen	40	
12	Michel Tilanus	20	
13	Elsa van der Heiden	22	
14	Ron Blom	20	
15	Petry van Kempen	14	
16	Corrie Rientsma	21	
17	Leo de Kleijn	18	
18	Eva van Sichem	27	
19	Wim Schul	20	
20	Arend van de Poel	18	
21	Judith Rümke	15	
22	Eng Que	30	
23	Christine Hensgens geb. Wassercordt	8	
24	Hans Hekking	18	
25	Els van Kleef	27	
26	Janny Koppens	28	
27	Robert Went	11	
28	Hanneke Suijs	25	
29	Klaas Zwart	88	
30	Willem Bos	894	
Total			

== 23: Grote Alliance Partij ==
Candidate list for Grote Alliance Partij
Position	Candidate	Votes	Result
1	J.A. Geiger	42	
2	Ron van de Ven	12	
Total			

== 23: Staatkundige Federatie ==
Candidate list for Staatkundige Federatie
Position	Candidate	Votes	Result
1	Wim Kock	26	
2	Jobsje Kerkhoff geb. van Ede	1	
3	Marijke Deckers	0	
4	Nel Klijnstra	0	
5	Tonia Leeuwenstijn	4	
Total			

== Source ==
- Kiesraad (11 September 1989). "Proces-verbaal zitting Kiesraad uitslag Tweede Kamerverkiezing 1989" (PDF) (in Dutch).
