= Hannie van Leeuwen =

Dutch politician (1926–2018)

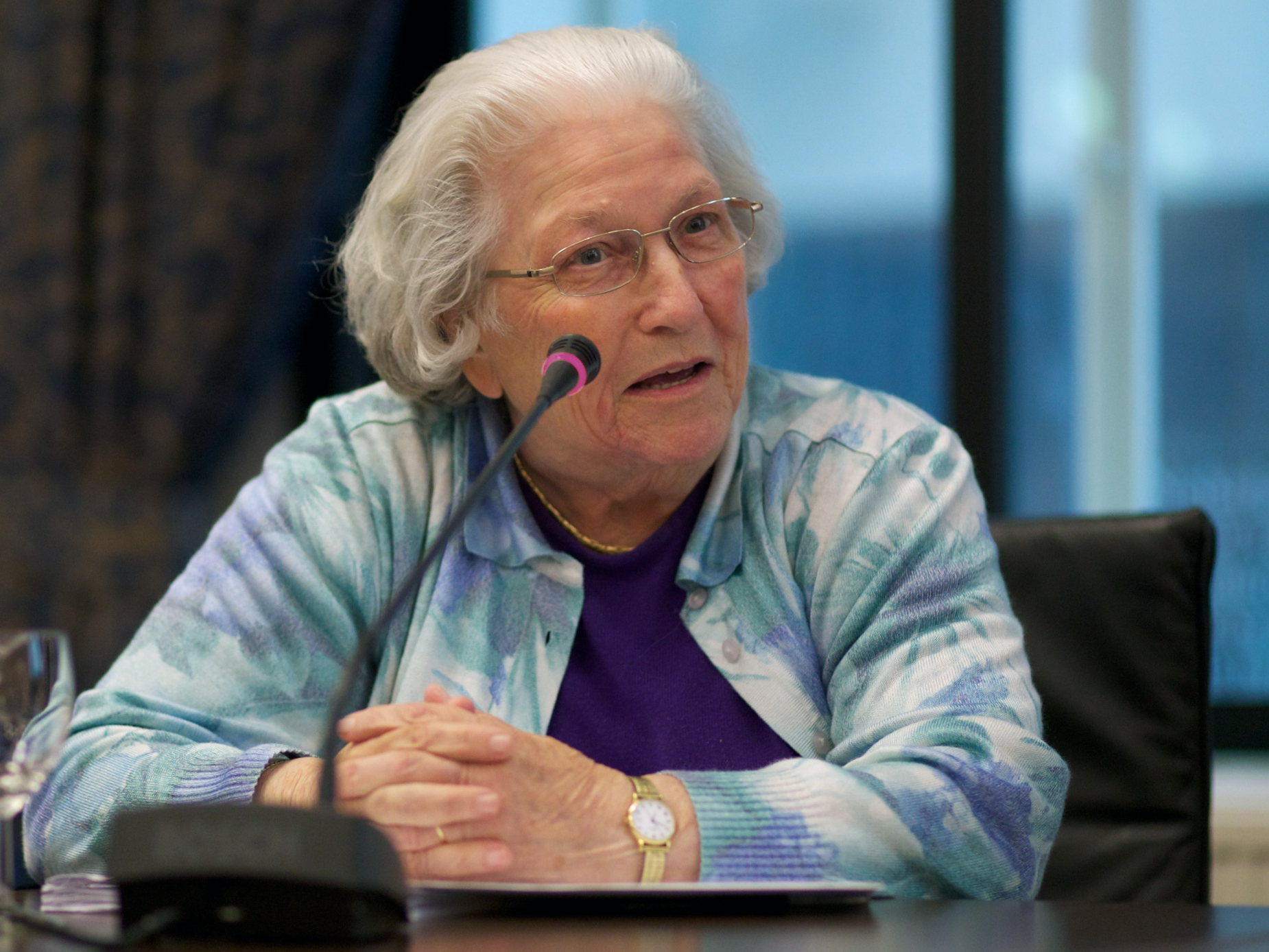

Member of the Senate
- In office 13 June 1995 – 12 June 2007

Acting mayor of Nootdorp
- In office 1 August 1991 – 1 June 1992
- Preceded by: Jos Waals
- Succeeded by: Hajé Schartman

Acting Mayor of Hazerswoude
- In office 16 September 1990 – 1 January 1991
- Preceded by: Unknown
- Succeeded by: Maarten Boelen

Member of the House of Representatives
- In office 15 November 1966 – 1 April 1978

Personal details
- Born: Johanna van Leeuwen; 18 January 1926 Delft, Netherlands
- Died: 1 August 2018 (aged 92) Rotterdam, Netherlands
- Party: Anti-Revolutionary Party (1941–1980); Christian Democratic Appeal (from 1980)
- Education: Vrije Universiteit (B.A.)
- Occupation: Politician banker civil servant

Johanna (Hannie) van Leeuwen (18 January 1926 – 1 August 2018) was a Dutch politician of the Anti-Revolutionary Party (until 1980) and its successor, the Christian Democratic Appeal (CDA) party.
