= Piet de Visser =

Piet de Visser may refer to:

- Piet de Visser (football manager) (born 1934), Dutch football manager
- Piet de Visser (politician) (1931–2012), Dutch politician
