= Elske ter Veld =

Dutch politician (1944-2017)

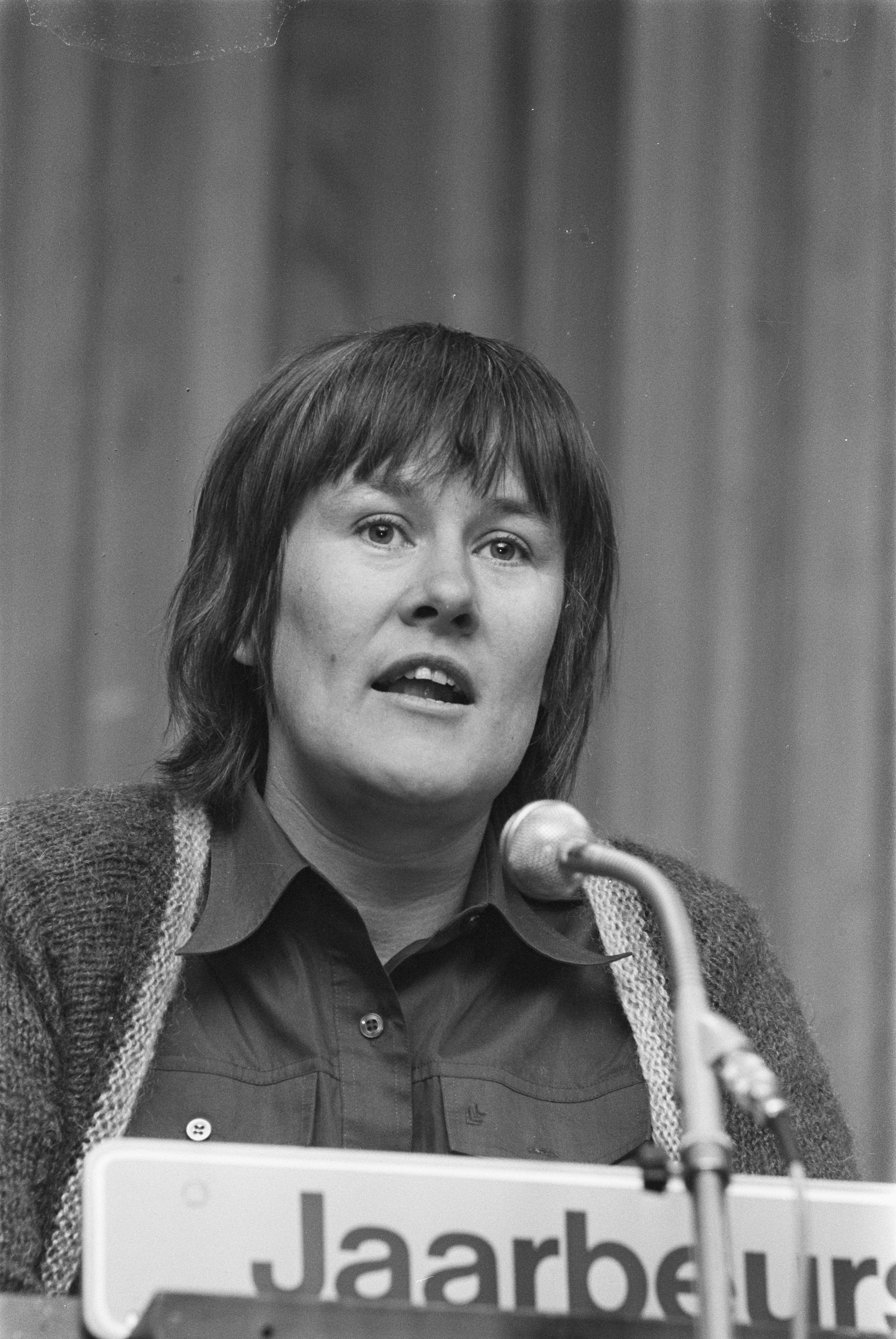
- Ter Veld in 1980

State Secretary for Social Affairs and Employment
- In office 7 November 1989 – 4 June 1993
- Minister: Bert de Vries
- Cabinet: Lubbers III
- Preceded by: Louw de Graaf
- Succeeded by: Jacques Wallage

Member of the Senate
- In office 13 juni 1995 – 9 juni 2003

Member of the House of Representatives
- In office 15 September 1981 – 6 november 1989

Personal details
- Born: Elske ter Veld; 1 August 1944 Groningen, Netherlands
- Died: 14 May 2017 (aged 72) Kortenhoef, Netherlands
- Party: Labour Party (PvdA)
- Spouse: Wim Fortuyn (m. 2003)
- Occupation: Politician

Elske ter Veld (1 August 1944 – 14 May 2017) was a Dutch politician who served as a member of the House of Representatives, State Secretary for Social Affairs and Employment, and later as a member of the Senate for the Labour Party (PvdA).

== Early life ==
Elske ter Veld was born in Groningen as the second of five children in a liberal, social-democratic family. Her father was a teacher of mathematics and science, and her mother worked as a physician. After completing higher secondary education, Ter Veld studied at the School of Social work, graduating in 1968 as a social worker. She worked as a youth worker in Assen and Groningen.

== Trade union work ==
In 1972 Ter Veld became head of the Women's Secretariat of the Federation of Dutch Trade Unions (NVV, later FNV). Under her leadership, the Secretariat focused on equal pay, social security rights, and the training of female union members. She challenged the male breadwinner model within the labour movement and was involved in national and international advisory bodies on labour and emancipation, including the Social and Economic Council and European trade union organisations.

== Parliamentary career ==
Ter Veld was elected to the House of Representatives in 1981, where she became known for her independence and strong focus on social security and women's emancipation. In 1989 Ter Veld was appointed State Secretary for Social Affairs and Employment in the Third Lubbers cabinet. In this role she introduced reforms in social welfare, parental leave, equal treatment legislation, and survivor benefits (Nabestaandenwet, Anw), while also defending controversial cuts to disability benefits (WAO).

=== Resignation ===
In June 1993, Ter Veld resigned as State Secretary after losing the confidence of her own party faction. The immediate cause was a letter on proposed cuts to social welfare for young people. The PvdA parliamentary group claimed they had not been sufficiently informed. Amid broader internal tensions within the party, she announced her resignation. That moment was widely reported after she burst into tears. When asked about it her reaction was: "It's my party and I cry if I want to". Despite later expressing that she felt misled by the party leadership, including its leader Wim Kok, Ter Veld remained loyal to the PvdA. From 1995 to 2003 she served as a member of the Senate, after which she ended her national political career.

== Later life and death ==
After leaving government, Ter Veld worked as an independent adviser and remained socially active. She lived in Kortenhoef, where she enjoyed rowing, skating, and sailing. She died at home on 14 May 2017 at the age of 72.

Political offices
Preceded by Louw de Graaf	State Secretary for Social Affairs and Employment; 1989–1993	Succeeded by Jacques Wallage
