= Ad Melkert =

Dutch politician

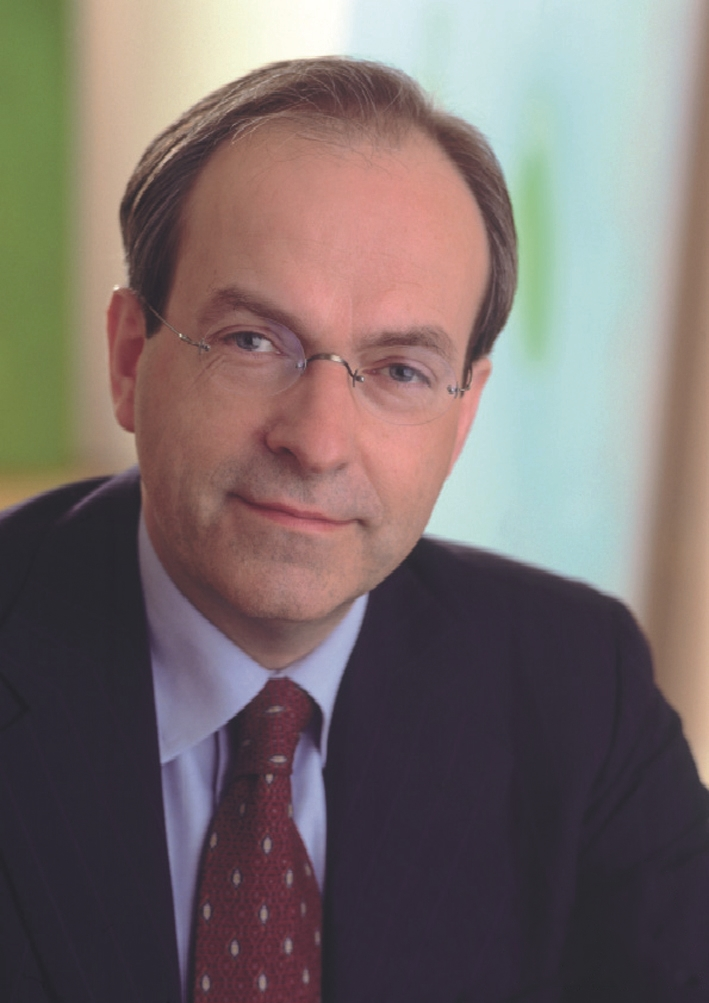
- Melkert in 2002

Member of the Social and Economic Council
- Incumbent
- Assumed office 1 April 2019
- Chair: Mariëtte Hamer

Member of the Council of State
- Incumbent
- Assumed office 20 January 2016
- Vice President: Piet Hein Donner (2016–2018); Thom de Graaf (from 2018)

Special Representative for the United Nations in Iraq
- In office 7 July 2009 – 1 October 2011
- Secretary-General: Ban Ki-moon
- Preceded by: Staffan de Mistura
- Succeeded by: Martin Kobler

Associate Administrator of the United Nations Development Programme
- In office 1 March 2006 – 7 July 2009
- Administrator: Kemal Derviş (2006–2006); Helen Clark (2009)
- Preceded by: Zéphirin Diabré
- Succeeded by: Rebeca Grynspan

Leader of the Labour Party
- In office 15 December 2001 – 16 May 2002
- Preceded by: Wim Kok
- Succeeded by: Wouter Bos

Parliamentary leader in the House of Representatives
- In office 13 July 1998 – 16 May 2002
- Preceded by: Jacques Wallage
- Succeeded by: Jeltje van Nieuwenhoven
- Parliamentary group: Labour Party

Minister of Social Affairs and Employment
- In office 22 August 1994 – 3 August 1998
- Prime Minister: Wim Kok
- Preceded by: Bert de Vries
- Succeeded by: Klaas de Vries

Member of the House of Representatives
- In office 19 May 1998 – 17 October 2002
- In office 3 June 1986 – 22 Augustus 1994
- Parliamentary group: Labour Party

Personal details
- Born: Adrianus Petrus Wilhelmus Melkert; 12 February 1956 (age 70) Gouda, Netherlands
- Party: Labour Party (from 1982)
- Other political affiliations: Political Party of Radicals (1974–1981)
- Children: 2 daughters
- Education: University of Amsterdam (B.Soc.Sc, MSSc)
- Occupation: Politician; diplomat; civil servant; corporate director; nonprofit director; trade association executive; activist

Adrianus Petrus Wilhelmus "Ad" Melkert (Dutch: [ɑt ˈmɛlkərt]; born 12 February 1956) is a Dutch politician and diplomat of the Labour Party (PvdA) who has served as a Member of the Council of State since 20 January 2016.

Melkert studied Political science at the University of Amsterdam obtaining a Master of Social Science degree. Melkert worked as a political activist for the youth branch of the European Community in Brussels from July 1981 until March 1984 and as a nonprofit director for the charity Oxfam Novib from March 1984 until June 1986. After the election of 1986 Melkert was elected as a Member of the House of Representatives and served as a frontbencher and spokesperson for Development Cooperation and the Environment. After the election of 1994 Melkert was appointed as Minister of Social Affairs and Employment in the Cabinet Kok I taking office on 22 August 1994. After the election of 1998 Melkert returned to the House of Representatives on 19 May 1998 and declined to serve in the new cabinet and was selected as Parliamentary leader on 13 July 1998. Shortly before an upcoming election Party Leader Wim Kok announced his retirement and Melkert announced his candidacy to succeed him as Leader and was selected as his successor on 15 December 2001.

For the election of 2002 Melkert served as Lijsttrekker (top candidate) but suffered a large defeat and stepped down as Leader and Parliamentary leader on 16 May 2002 but continued to serve in the House of Representatives as a backbencher. In October 2002 Melkert was nominated as an executive director of the World Bank Group and the International Monetary Fund serving until March 2006 when he was nominated as an Associate Administrator of the United Nations Development Programme (UNDP) serving until July 2009 when he was appointed as the Special Representative for the United Nations in Iraq serving until his resignation in October 2011.

Melkert continued to be active in politics and in December 2015 was nominated as a Member of the Council of State on 20 January 2016. Melkert also became active in the private and public sectors as a corporate and non-profit director and served on several state commissions and councils on behalf of the government, and works as a trade association executive serving as Chairman of the Dutch Hospitals association since December 2018 and became a Member of the Social and Economic Council for the Industry and Employers confederation (VNO-NCW) in April 2019.

== Biography ==
=== Early life ===
Adrianus Petrus Wilhelmus Melkert was born into a Roman Catholic middle-class family in Gouderak, a small village situated in the province of South Holland. His father was a barber. Melkert attended a Roman Catholic primary school in Moordrecht until 1968, after which he continued his studies at the Coornhert Gymnasium in Gouda, a state school specialising in the arts. In the final year of his secondary education, he worked for a greengrocer at the local market. Melkert graduated in 1974 and went on to study political science at the University of Amsterdam. During this period he became active within the radical left-wing Christian Political Party of Radicals (PPR) party and served as a member of the board of the youth organisation of the PPR between 1978 and 1980. He went on to become a member of the general board of the Dutch branch of the European Movement, the chairperson of the Council of European National Youth Committees and the chairperson of the Dutch Platform for International Youth Work. In 1979 he was elected to the party board of the PPR and was 3rd candidate on the PPR's list for the 1979 European Parliament elections. He graduated in 1981 and received the Dutch Society for International Relations prize for best Master's thesis of 1981, the subject of which dealt with the foreign policy of the Den Uyl cabinet.

In 1981 he became general secretary of the youth forum of the European Community in Brussels. In this capacity, he attended an illegal youth conference in Chile, then ruled by Pinochet. Meanwhile, tensions within the PPR had escalated. Melkert was a member of the so-called, 'Blues' or 'Godebald' group of radicals, which favoured closer cooperation with the social-democrat Labour Party (PvdA) and the social-liberal Democrats 66 (D66) party. The conflict came to an end in 1981. The 'Reds', who favoured closer cooperation with the left-wing socialist Pacifist Socialist Party (PSP) party and the communist Communist Party of the Netherlands (CPN) party, and the 'Greens', who favoured an independent Green Party, joined forces. Many 'Blues', including Melkert, left the PPR for the PvdA. In 1984 he became director of international affairs at Oxfam Novib, the Dutch branch of Oxfam, and moved to The Hague. He also became a member of the board of the local PvdA branch. In 1986 he published a book on international development in the Netherlands titled: The Next Minister: Development Cooperation with the Cabinet, 1965 – 19?

=== Politics ===
In 1996 Melkert was elected into the House of Representatives. In the early years, he was the party's spokesperson on foreign affairs, development cooperation and environmental affairs.

After the 1989 elections, he took the post of financial spokesperson of the PvdA, becoming the party's primary spokesperson in the debates on the national budget. Between 1990 and 1994 he was vice-chairman of the parliament's committee on finance.

As an MP, Melkert also participated in several boards of civil society organisations. He was a member of the board of advisers of the Foundation for Communication on Development Cooperation, chairman of the Foundation for Development Cooperation Almere-Port Sudan, and vice-chairman of the Atlantic Committee. Also, he wrote a column in the region newspaper, De Gooi- en Eemlander, that covered Hilversum and the Almere region.

In 1994 Melkert became the Minister of Social Affairs and Employment in the first cabinet of Prime Minister, Wim Kok. He held responsibility for one of its main goals, which, in the words of those who shaped the cabinet was: Employment, Employment, Employment. As a minister, Melkert was known for his work ethic. Each Friday he would fill a postman's cart, which he had bought specifically for that purpose, with dossiers. Upon his return to work the following Monday all the dossiers would have been read. His work ethic was also noticeable in the vast amount of policies and laws he initiated during his tenure as minister.

- In 1995 he initiated a plan to employ 40.000 long-term unemployed. They would be offered a so-called, Melkert job, mostly in the public sector e.g. tram conductor, high school janitor etc. These jobs were subsidised by the national government.
- In 1995 Melkert also published a note, The Other Side of the Netherlands, in which he proposed several plans to combat silent poverty and social exclusion. This led to the 1997 law: Prevention and Combat of Poverty and Social Exclusion. It changed the social security and the old age pension laws, giving municipalities more ways of offering special social benefits to the poorest citizens.
- In the same year he also wrote the note, Flexibility and Certainty, in which proposals for a more flexible labour market were made.
- In 1997, in collaboration with Frank de Grave, the VVD (Liberal) state secretary of social affairs, he published the note, Working on Security, in which the future of the social security system was researched. It included plans to reform the way old-age pensions were financed.
- In the same year he also initiated a White Cleaners plan, which stimulated the hiring of cleaners by individuals with the added responsibility of paying taxes and social benefits. The plan was intended to combat unemployment of the least educated, and the informal economy.
- In addition, he united all employment laws, such as the Youth Work law, as well as the 'job pools' into one Law Activation Working-Seeking, which offered municipalities more possibilities to employ the long-term unemployed.

As minister of Social Affairs, he often came into conflict with the VVD's (People's Party for Freedom and Democracy) Minister of Finance, Gerrit Zalm.

Following the 1998 general elections in which Melkert was the PvdA's fifth-ranking candidate, he became leader of the PvdA in parliament. He also served as chair of the parliament's committee on Information and Security Services. During his period as chairman, the party discipline tightened. The PvdA's image appeared arrogant. A conflict situation between Melkert and Rob van Gijzel, a popular PvdA MP, regarding the post of spokesperson on fraud in the construction sector, resulted in Van Gijzel leaving parliament. Despite concerns regarding Melkert's policy of marginalising and isolating the Socialist Party, he was seen as a competent politician and was designated to succeed Prime Minister, Wim Kok, who officially retired as leader of the PvdA in 2001.

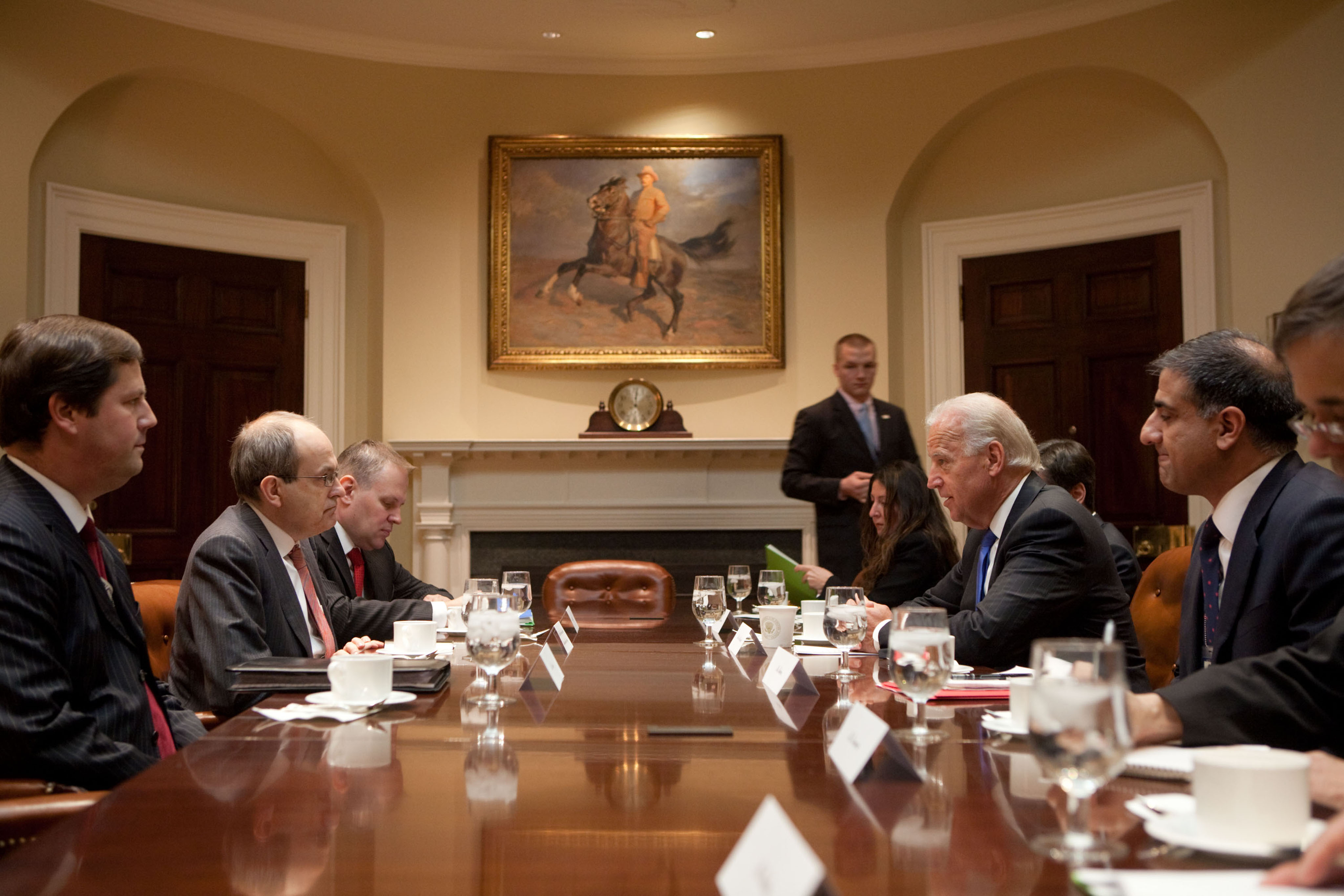
Special Representative Ad Melkert and Vice President of the United States Joe Biden in the Roosevelt Room at the White House on 5 January 2010.

=== Elections of 2002 ===
It was widely anticipated that the election would revolve mainly around the question as to whether the Labour Party or the People's Party for Freedom and Democracy (VVD) would become the largest party and that either Melkert or the Leader of the People's Party for Freedom and Democracy Hans Dijkstal were to become the next Prime Minister. Melkert and Dijkstal were the front runners in the early stages of the campaign but the unexpected arrival of former Sociology professor Pim Fortuyn of the Livable Netherlands (LN) party and later the Pim Fortuyn List (LPF) party turned the polls.

Fortuyn shifted the election issues from Business as usual to Immigration and Integration policies, Healthcare reform and the state of the Public sector. Fortuyn blamed the problems in the country on the Purple cabinets (in which both Melkert and Dijkstal served as ministers) and depicted Melkert and Dijkstal as two bureaucrats who were out of touch with the voter's concerns. During the election, Fortuyn accused Melkert of the demonization of his character and personal integrity. In several television debates between Melkert and Fortuyn, it became apparent that Melkert was no match for Fortuyn's rather unconventional, though highly charismatic debating style. In the now infamous debate on the night when the results of the 2002 municipal elections were telecast, Fortuyn, having just won the elections in Rotterdam, made a lively, enthusiastic impression, rarely missing an opportunity to mock his opponent who appeared to sit with a degree of discomfort. The incompatibility of the two men dominated the rest of the election campaign. In a one-on-one debate during the programme, Network, their vastly different styles were once again highlighted. To every question posed by the host, Melkert responded with a detailed course of action. With regard to Fortuyn's plans, Melkert demanded 'footnotes!', implying that his opponent's contribution was unrealistic and devoid of detail. There were those who perceived this as arrogance on his part. Steps were taken to redress the possibility of a negative, bureaucratic image and it was revealed that Melkert was an avid follower of Feyenoord football club and enjoyed culinary pursuits: a cookbook was published on his personal website. In May 2006 Melkert revealed to politician-turned-television personality, Paul Rosenmöller, that perhaps by being too entrenched in the confines of the governmental tower, his demeanour had come across as somewhat patronising: something that did not appeal to the voter.

On 6 May 2002 nine days before the election Fortuyn was assassinated by a 32-year-old environmental activist. in Hilversum. A few relatively minor riots erupted in The Hague where Melkert was at the time, urging him to make a quick departure from the city. After receiving death threats, including a loaded gun in the mail, he and his family temporarily went into hiding. Melkert's PvdA lost nearly half its seats, decreasing from 45 to 23 in the 150-seat House of Representatives. The party fell from 1st to 4th place. Melkert resigned as political leader on election night and was replaced by the former speaker of the House of Representatives, Jeltje van Nieuwenhoven. Melkert remained in parliament for a short time afterwards. His last major parliamentary debate was on the state of the European Union.

=== World Bank and the United Nations ===
In November 2002, Melkert was appointed executive director of the World Bank. In April 2005 he was a serious candidate for the post of Administrator of the United Nations Development Programme (UNDP). It went, however, to the Turkish economist and politician, Kemel Dervis. In January 2006 Melkert was appointed Associate Administrator of the UNDP. In 2009 Melkert was appointed Special Representative of the Secretary-General of the United Nations in Iraq. He was a candidate to succeed Juan Somavía as Director-General of the International Labour Organization but lost to Guy Ryder.

The PvdA formed an electoral alliance with GroenLinks in the early 2020s. Melkert opposed merger plans, arguing that the focus of GroenLinks on climate change would deter moderate voters. He said that the PvdA should win back working-class people, and he has supported Rood Vooruit, an initiative founded in 2023 that has been critical of a merger.

== Decorations ==
Honours
Ribbon bar	Honour	Country	Date	Comment
	Officer of the Order of Orange-Nassau	Netherlands	30 October 1998	

Party political offices
Preceded by Jacques Wallage	Parliamentary leader of the Labour Party in the House of Representatives; 1998–2002	Succeeded by Jeltje van Nieuwenhoven
Preceded by Jacques Wallage	Deputy Leader of the Labour Party; 1998–2001	Succeeded by Klaas de Vries
Preceded by Jacques Wallage	Deputy Leader of the Labour Party; 1998–2001	Succeeded by Jeltje van Nieuwenhoven
Preceded by Wim Kok	Leader of the Labour Party; 2001–2002	Succeeded by Wouter Bos
Preceded by Wim Kok; 1998	Lijsttrekker of the Labour Party; 2002	Succeeded by Wouter Bos; 2003
Political offices
Preceded by Bert de Vries	Minister of Social Affairs and Employment; 1994–1998	Succeeded by Klaas de Vries
Diplomatic posts
Preceded by Pieter Sterk	Executive Director of the World Bank Group; 2002–2006	Succeeded by Herman Wijffels
Preceded by Pieter Sterk	Executive Director for Benelux, Israel and Eastern Europe of the International Monetary Fund; 2002–2006	Succeeded by Herman Wijffels
Preceded by Zéphirin Diabré	Associate Administrator of the United Nations Development Programme; 2006–2009	Succeeded by Rebeca Grynspan
Preceded by Staffan de Mistura	Special Representative for the United Nations Assistance; Mission for Iraq; 2009–2011	Succeeded by Martin Kobler
Business positions
Preceded by Yvonne van Rooy	Chairman of the Executive Board of the Hospitals association 2018–present	Incumbent
Sporting positions
Preceded by Hui Wang	Chairman of the Supervisory board of ADO Den Haag; 2018–present	Incumbent
