= Jacques Wallage =

Dutch politician (1946–2026)

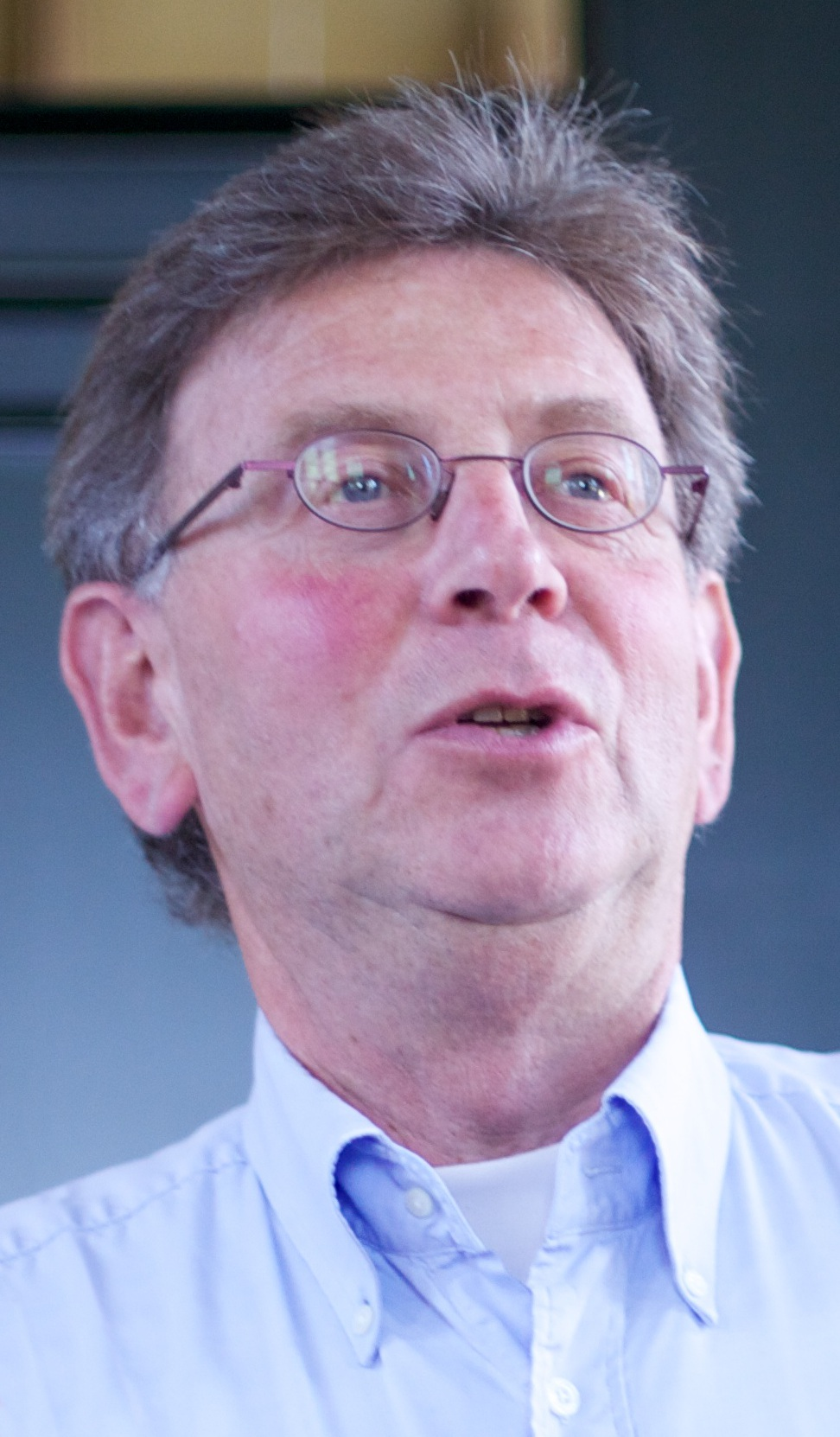
- Wallage in 2011

Mayor of Groningen
- In office 1 October 1998 – 25 June 2009
- Preceded by: Han Lammers (ad interim)
- Succeeded by: Peter Rehwinkel

Parliamentary leader in the House of Representatives
- In office 30 May 1998 – 10 July 1998
- Preceded by: Wim Kok
- Succeeded by: Ad Melkert
- In office 22 August 1994 – 19 May 1998
- Preceded by: Wim Kok
- Succeeded by: Wim Kok
- Parliamentary group: Labour Party

State Secretary for Social Affairs and Employment
- In office 9 June 1993 – 22 August 1994
- Prime Minister: Ruud Lubbers
- Preceded by: Elske ter Veld
- Succeeded by: Robin Linschoten

State Secretary for Education and Sciences
- In office 7 November 1989 – 9 June 1993
- Prime Minister: Ruud Lubbers
- Preceded by: Nell Ginjaar-Maas
- Succeeded by: Roel in 't Veld

Member of the House of Representatives
- In office 17 May 1994 – 26 August 1998
- In office 10 June 1981 – 7 November 1989

Personal details
- Born: Jacques Wallage; 27 September 1946 Apeldoorn, Netherlands
- Died: 12 August 2026 (aged 79) Groningen, Netherlands
- Party: Labour Party (1964–2026)
- Spouses: Marijke Drees (m. 1980; div. 1988) Fransien Drees (m. 1990)
- Children: Chaja Wallage (born 1983); Martijn Wallage (born 1984)
- Education: University of Groningen (Bachelor of Social Science, Master of Social Science)
- Occupation: Politician; sociologist; researcher; corporate director; nonprofit director; academic administrator; political pundit; activist; professor

Jacques Wallage (Dutch pronunciation: [ʑɑk ˈʋɑlaːɣə]; 27 September 1946 – 12 August 2026) was a Dutch politician of the Labour Party (PvdA) and sociologist.

== Life and career ==
Wallage attended a gymnasium in Groningen from April 1959 until May 1965 and applied at the University of Groningen in June 1965 majoring in Political sociology and Urban planning and obtaining a Bachelor of Social Science degree in Political sociology in June 1967. He worked as a student researcher before graduating with a Master of Social Science degree in Political sociology in July 1971. Wallage served on the municipal council of Groningen from April 1970 until June 1981 and served as an alderman in Groningen from May 1972 until June 1981. Wallage also was active as a political activist and was one of the student leaders of the New Left movement which aimed to steer the Labour Party more to social democracy.

Wallage was elected as a Member of the House of Representatives after the election of 1982, taking office on 10 June 1981 serving as chair of the parliamentary committee for Science Policy, spokesperson for education, social work, equality, minorities and deputy spokesperson for welfare and culture. After the 1989 general election Wallage was appointed as State Secretary for Education and Sciences in the Lubbers III cabinet, taking office on 7 November 1989. Wallage was appointed as State Secretary for Social Affairs and Employment following the resignation of Elske ter Veld, taking office on 9 June 1993. After the 1994 general election Wallage returned to the House of Representatives, taking office on 17 May 1994. Following the cabinet formation of 1994 the Leader of the Labour Party and the parliamentary leader of the Labour Party in the House of Representatives Wim Kok became prime minister in the Kok I cabinet, the Labour Party leadership approached Wallage as his successor as parliamentary leader, Wallage accepted and became the parliamentary leader, taking office on 22 August 1994. As parliamentary leader of the largest party in the House of Representatives he also chaired the parliamentary committee for Intelligence and Security. After the 1998 general election, Wim Kok returned as parliamentary leader on 19 May 1998 but following the cabinet formation of 1998 he remained as prime minister in the Kok II cabinet and the Labour Party leadership approached Wallage as interim parliamentary leader, taking office on 30 May 1998 until Ad Melkert was approached as parliamentary leader on 10 July 1998 and he continued to serve in the House of Representatives as a frontbencher and the de facto Whip.

In August 1998 Wallage was nominated as mayor of Groningen, he resigned from the House of Representatives on 26 August 1998 and was installed as mayor of Groningen, serving from 1 October 1998 until 25 June 2009. Wallage semi-retired from national politics and became active in the private and public sectors and occupied numerous seats as a corporate director and nonprofit director on several boards of directors and supervisory boards (PostNL, International Institute of Social History, Groninger Museum, International Cycling Film Festival, Radio Netherlands Worldwide, Electronic Commerce Platform, Royal Association of Shipowners and the Maritime Research Institute) and served on several state commissions and councils on behalf of the government (Council for Public Administration, Accreditation Council, Kadaster and Public Pension Funds APB). Wallage also served as a distinguished professor of Governmental Studies, Public administration and Social integration at the University of Groningen from 1 September 2009 until 1 October 2014 and a distinguished visiting professor of Public administration at the University of Groningen starting on 1 October 2014.

Wallage died in Groningen on 12 August 2026, at the age of 79.

== Decorations ==
Honours
Ribbon bar	Honour	Country	Date	Comment
	Knight of the Netherlands Lion			

- honorary citizen of Groningen

Party political offices
Preceded by Wim Kok	Parliamentary leader of the Labour Party in the House of Representatives; 1994–1998; 1998	Succeeded by Wim Kok
Preceded by Wim Kok	Parliamentary leader of the Labour Party in the House of Representatives; 1994–1998; 1998	Succeeded by Ad Melkert
Civic offices
Preceded by Jos van Kemenade	Chairman of the Supervisory board of the Council for Public Administration; 2009–2017	Succeeded by Han Polman
Political offices
Preceded by Nell Ginjaar-Maas	State Secretary for Education and Sciences; 1989–1993	Succeeded by Roel in 't Veld
Preceded by Elske ter Veld	State Secretary for Social; Affairs and Employment; 1993–1994	Succeeded by Robin Linschoten
Preceded by Han Lammers; Ad interim	Mayor of Groningen; 1998–2009	Succeeded by Peter Rehwinkel
