= Coos Huijsen =

Dutch politician (1939–2026)

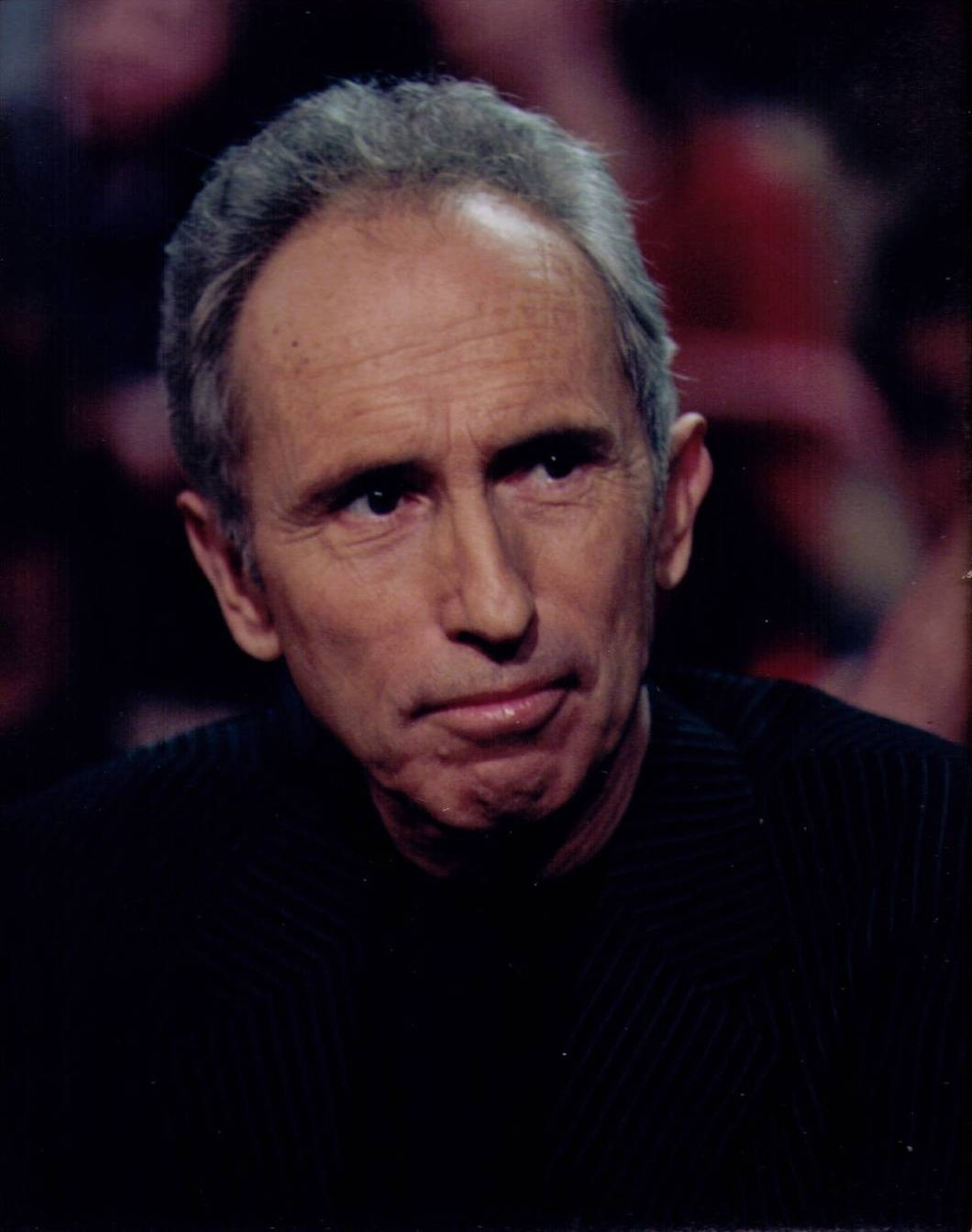

Member of the Dutch House of Representatives
- In office 20 June 1972 – 7 December 1972
- In office 30 March 1976 – 8 June 1977

Personal details
- Born: Jacobus Huijsen; 20 March 1939 The Hague, Netherlands
- Died: 19 October 2026 (aged 87)
- Party: Christian Historical Union (1972–1976); Group Huijsen (1976–1977); Labour Party (1977)

Jacobus "Coos" Huijsen (Dutch: [ɦœy.sə(n)]; 20 March 1939 – 19 October 2026) was a Dutch historian, writer, educator, politician and gay rights activist. In 1976, he became the first parliamentarian in the world to openly express their homosexuality.

== Life and career ==
Huijsen was a member of the Dutch House of Representatives in 1972–1973 and from 1976 to 1977. In his first term in office, he was a member of the Christian Historical Union, which he left because the party would not support the left-leaning Den Uyl cabinet; in his second term, he sat as an independent member under his own banner of Groep-Huijsen. As a member of the House of Representatives in 1976, Huijsen came out as gay, making him the country's first openly LGBT politician and the first known openly gay member of a national legislature in the world. In 2016, Huijsen published an autobiographical account of his coming-out, in the context of a changing Dutch society in the 1970s:

- Homo Politicus. De eerste parlementariër ter wereld die uit de kast kwam ("Homo Politicus. The First MP Worldwide Who Came Out of the Closet" - autobiography)

In this book, Huijsen describes how he participated in the Dutch gay rights movement in the years after his coming-out, when he co-founded the Foundation for Free Relationship Rights (Stichting Vrije Relatierechten). The goal of this foundation was to make the gay community address the larger public and the political establishment, by appealing to their sense of humanity. Gay rights were human rights, and, as such, were to be put on the political agenda. It paved the way to legal equality for same-sex relationships, and, finally, in the introduction of same-sex marriage in the Netherlands (2001).

After leaving parliament, Huijsen worked as a school teacher and director. He also switched parties again, becoming a member of the Dutch Labour Party in which he was active until 2000; he left that party because he found the party put too little work into education and gay emancipation. He then pursued a career as a historian, with a specific interest in the cultural-historical context of democracy. His first book, Nog is links niet verloren ("The left is not yet lost"; 1982) described the widening gap between the elites of progressive political parties and their popular, traditional base. Later, Huijsen wrote multiple books about the relations between the Dutch national narrative and the royal dynasty, the House of Orange, including:

- De oranjemythe, een postmodern fenomeen ("The Orange Myth, a postmodern phenomenon"),
- Beatrix: De kroon op de republiek ("Beatrix, crown on the republic"; 2005) and
- Nederland en het verhaal van Oranje ("The Netherlands and the story of Orange"; originally a PhD thesis, University of Amsterdam, 2012).

Huijsen was married and lived with his husband in Amsterdam. He died on 19 October 2026, at the age of 87.
