= Klaas Tuinstra =

Dutch politician (1945–2022)

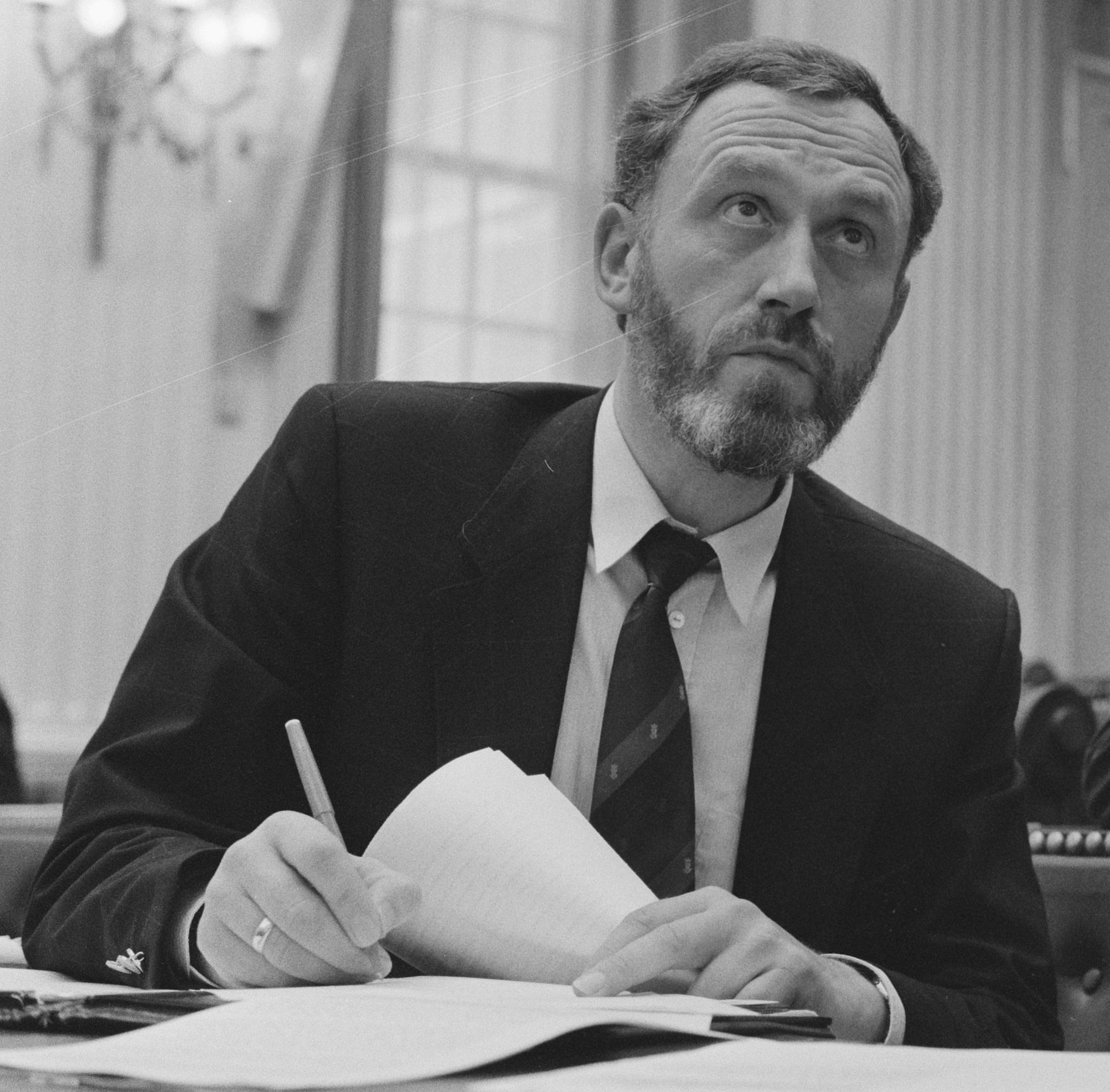
- Tuinstra in 1988

Member of the House of Representatives of the Netherlands
- In office 1986–1994

Member of the Provincial Council of Friesland
- In office 1971–1986

Personal details
- Born: 10 February 1945 Sint Annaparochie, Niederlande
- Died: 2 February 2022 (aged 76) Sint Annaparochie, Netherlands
- Party: ARP; CDA

Klaas Tuinstra (10 February 1945 – 2 February 2022) was a Dutch politician. A member of the Anti-Revolutionary Party and later the Christian Democratic Appeal, he served in the House of Representatives from 1986 to 1994. He died in Sint Annaparochie on 2 February 2022, at the age of 76.
