= Frits Castricum =

Dutch journalist and politician

Frits Castricum (19 April 1947, Boxtel – 12 September 2011, Boxtel) was a Dutch journalist and Labour Party politician. He was a member of the House of Representatives of the Netherlands from 1977 to 1994, the European Parliament from 1994 to 1999 and the Senate of the Netherlands from 1999 to 2003.

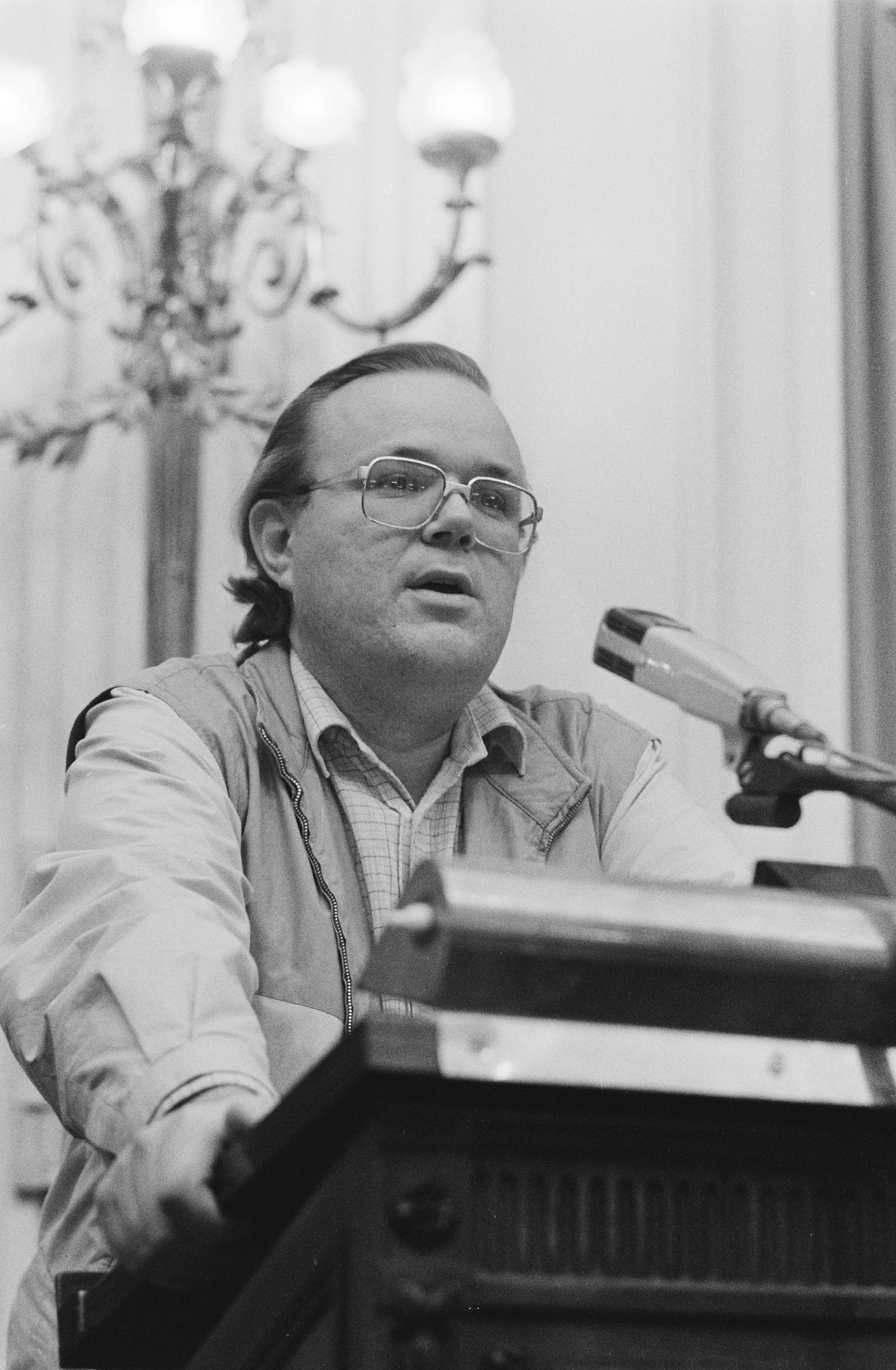
Frits Castricum, was a Dutch journalist and politician.
