= Marius Ernsting =

Dutch politician

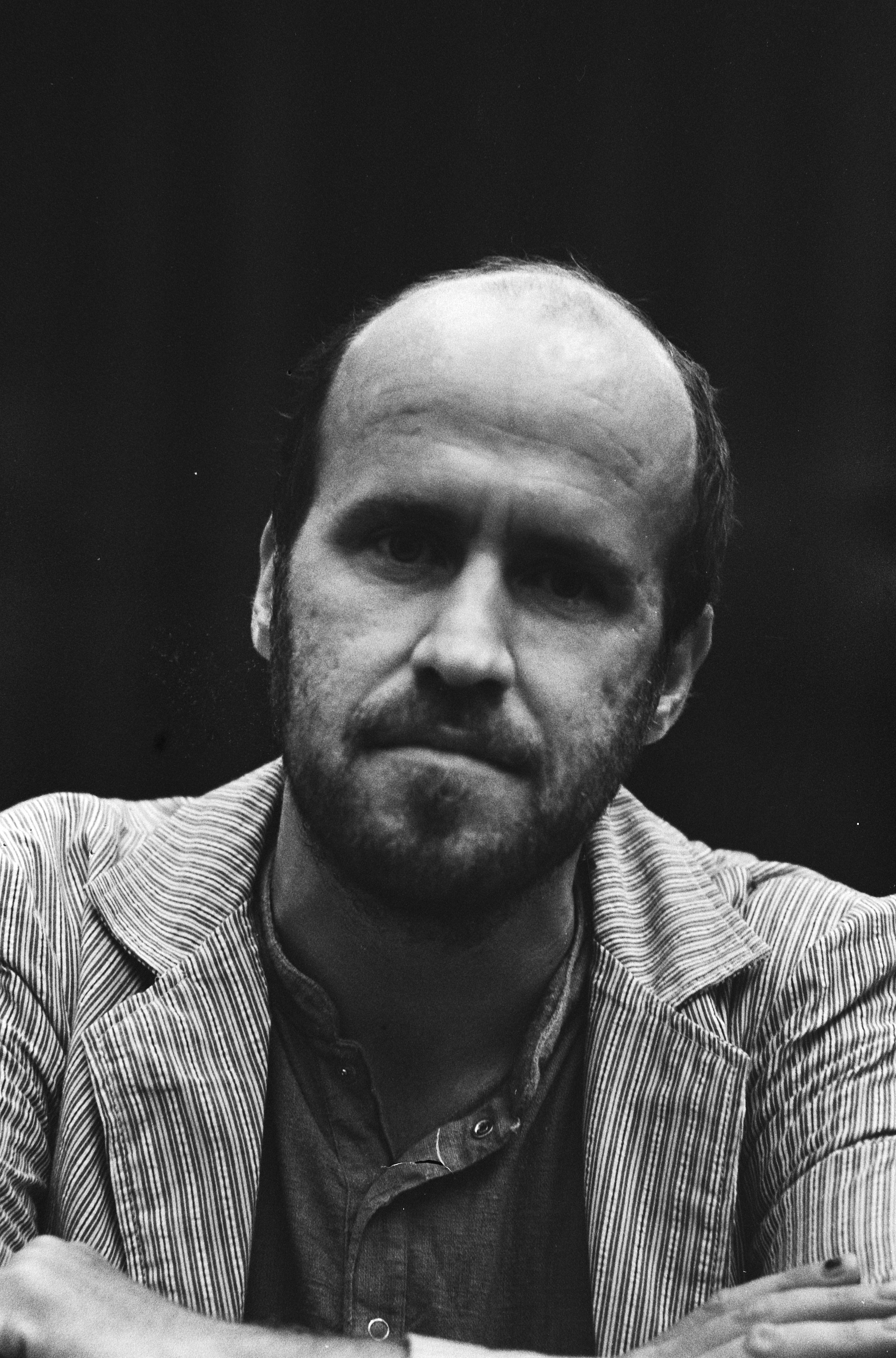
- Marius Ernsting in 1983

Member of the House of Representatives
- In office 7 September 1983 – 3 June 1986

Member of the Provincial Council of North Holland
- In office 28 April 1987 – 18 April 1995

Personal details
- Born: 5 November 1947 (age 78) Beemster, Netherlands
- Party: Kabouter Party (1970-1972); CPN (1976-1991); GroenLinks (from 1991)
- Children: 3
- Education: Vrije Universiteit Amsterdam

Marius Ernsting (born 5 November 1947) is a Dutch non-profit director and former politician. A former member of the anarchist Kabouters, serving as one of their members in the Amsterdam municipal council from 1971 to 1972, Ernsting served in the Dutch House of Representatives from 1983 to 1986 and in the North Holland provincial council from 1987 to 1995 for the Communist Party of the Netherlands (CPN) and from 1991 for GroenLinks. He has also been active in the non-profit volunteer sector.

== Early life and Kabouter Party ==
Marius Ernsting was born on 5 November 1947 in Beemster into a family of horticulturalists. He was raised in a religiously orthodox Reformed Protestant family, but abandoned the faith during his student years due to what he saw as a "lack of elementary justice" in the church. After completing his secondary education in Purmerend and Amsterdam, Ernsting began attending the Vrije Universiteit Amsterdam in 1965, studying political science.

In Amsterdam, Ernsting became involved in the student protest movement, but following the 1969 occupation of the Maagdenhuis he found these movements too abstract and focused on theoretical discussions. Subsequently, he joined the Kabouters, an anarchist movement which Ernsting saw as necessary to draw attention to issues ignored by the political establishment. In April 1971, Ernsting was elected to the Amsterdam municipal council for the Kabouter Party, but resigned the next year in order to help pay for his studies. He graduated from the Vrije Universiteit Amsterdam with a political science degree in 1973, and became a social worker in Amsterdam.

== CPN member ==
Following his 1972 resignation, Ernsting had publicly expressed an interest in joining either the Labour Party (PvdA) or the Communist Party of the Netherlands (CPN), in order to gain contact with larger groups of the population. After coming into contact with prominent communists during his job as a social worker, Ernsting joined the CPN in 1976, becoming secretary of the CPN chapter in the Jordaan that same year. In 1979, he moved to Amsterdam-Noord, where he served in the neighborhood council from September 1981 to 1983. He also became active in the national CPN, serving in the party's leadership in 1982 and 1983, as its treasurer from 1982 to 1988 and as vice-chairman from 1988 to 1991.

In September 1983, Ernsting unexpectedly became a member of the House of Representatives, replacing Gijs Schreuders after he had resigned his seat. As an MP, Ernsting focused on internal affairs, education, science and cultural affairs. After the CPN lost all its House seats in the 1986 Dutch general election, Ernsting left the House of Representatives and was elected to the North Holland provincial council in 1987. Despite having been skeptical in the past about the formation of a united party with the Political Party Radicals (PPR) and Pacifist Socialist Party (PSP), he would eventually come to look back on the cooperation of the CPN with the PPR and PSP as "generally positive", though he would continue to criticise the newly united GroenLinks party for its perceived lack of a clear political profile. He served as the leader of the GroenLinks group in the North Holland provincial council until 1995.

== Later life ==
Ernsting has been active in the non-profit sector after his retirement from politics, serving as the director of the volunteer organisation Humanitas from 1996 to 2006 and the chairman of a national organisation for volunteer organisations from 2006 to 2013, among other roles.

== Personal life ==
Ernsting is married, and has three children.
