= Hajé Schartman =

Dutch politician

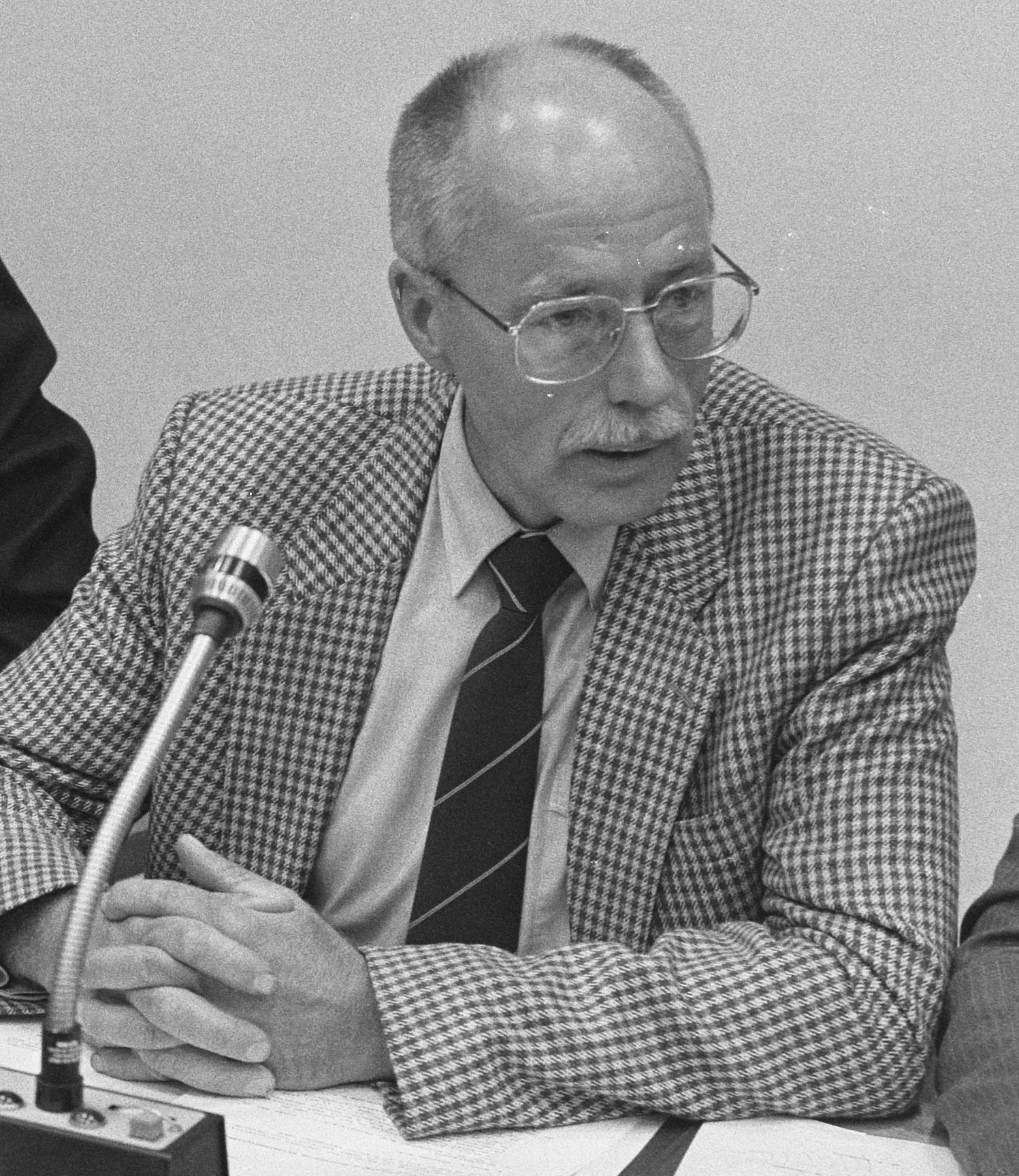
Hajé Schartman

Herman-Joseph (Hajé) Schartman (13 January 1937, in Delden – 7 April 2008, in Nootdorp) was a Dutch politician who served as a member of the House of Representatives from 1981 to 1992 for the Christian Democratic Appeal (CDA).
