= Master of Social Science =

Academic degree

A Master of Social Science (MSocSc, MSSc or MSS) is a master's degree which has a number of different meanings dependent upon the education system in question.

== Europe ==
In Finland and Sweden, where the university degree nomenclatura is based on the faculties from which they are awarded, Master of Social Science is the name given to any master's degree awarded by the Faculty of Social Science. This is just as the Faculty of Theology awards Masters of Theology (M.Th.), the Faculty of Arts awards Masters of Fine Arts (M.F.A.), and so forth. Consequently, Master of Social Science degrees are quite common in Finland and Sweden. Examples of majors in Master of Social Science degrees in Sweden include peace and conflict studies, economics and statistics.

In the United Kingdom, MSSc degrees are unusual and are almost always postgraduate in nature. Common subjects that would lead to the award of MSSc include but are not limited to social work, criminology, politics, and sociology.

It is also available at several Danish universities, including Copenhagen University, Copenhagen Business School, Aalborg University, and Roskilde University, in a number of subjects.

== America ==
In the United States, the Maxwell School of Citizenship and Public Affairs at Syracuse University of New York can award this degree through the advanced management courses of distance education. In addition, Ohio University and the University of Chicago can also award this degree. As of 2017, the University of California Los Angeles is the newest school to offer this degree.

== Asia ==
Both Hong Kong Baptist University and the Chinese University of Hong Kong award such degrees, which are generally master's programs in media, advertising or social sciences.

In Singapore, the Master of Social Science is a professional degree in international relations and regional studies. Such as the National University of Singapore award such degrees.

In Taiwan, National Dong Hwa University is the first institution awarding the Master of Social Science in Ethnic Relations & Culture and Indigenous Affairs & Development.
