= Piet de Visser (politician) =

Dutch politician (1931–2012)

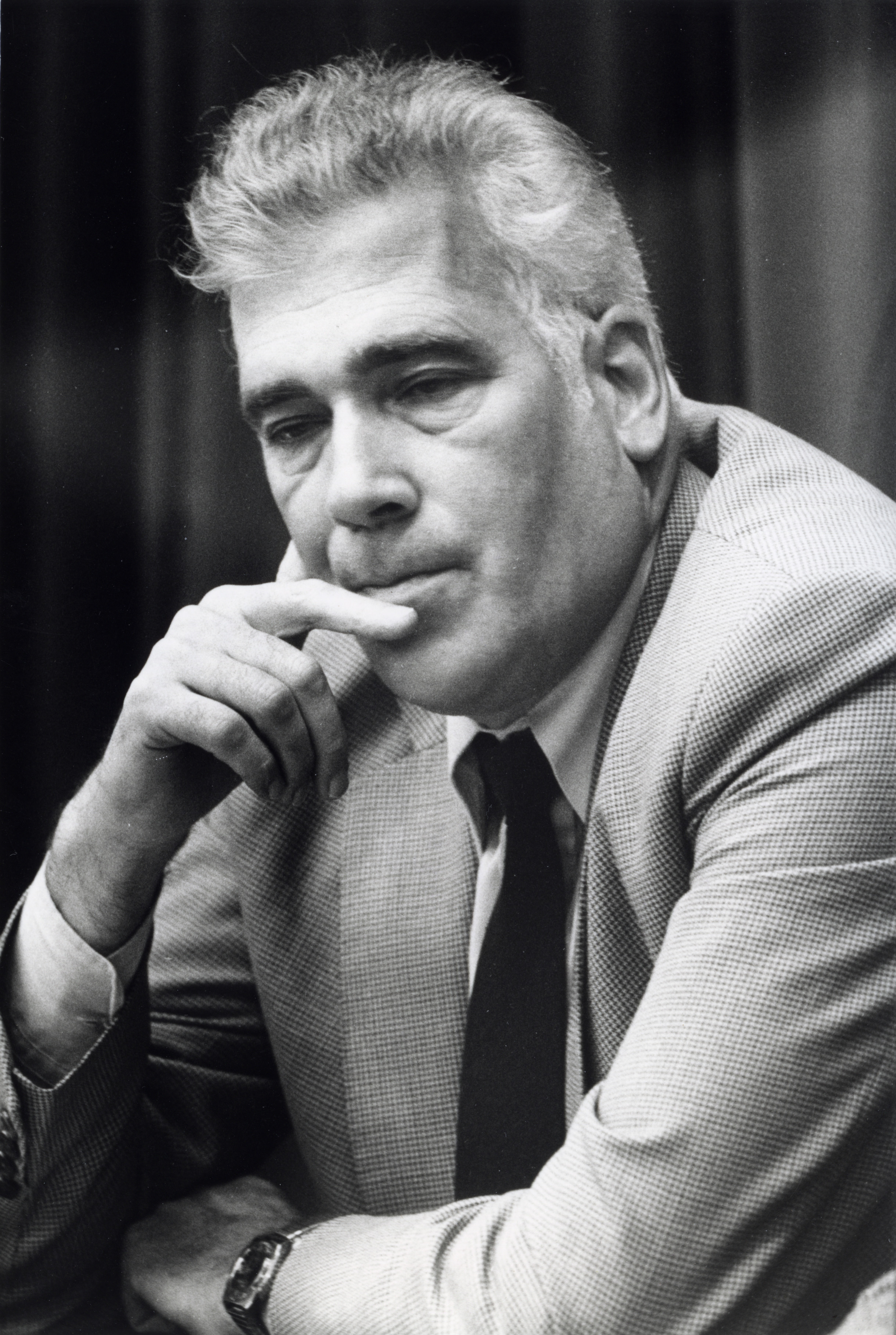
Piet de Visser

Marius Jacobus "Piet" de Visser (16 April 1931 – 19 December 2012) was a Dutch politician for the Labour Party (PvdA).

== Life and career ==
De Visser was born and died in Rotterdam. He studied economics at Erasmus University Rotterdam. Next, he served as a municipal councilor of Monster, South Holland.

From 1981 to 1991, with two interruptions, De Visser was a member of the House of Representatives. He was an anti-nuclear pacifist and belonged to the left wing of his party. In the late 1980s, he was involved in the making of a new passport. After his political career, he switched parties for GreenLeft.
