= Bert de Vries =

Dutch politician (born 1938)

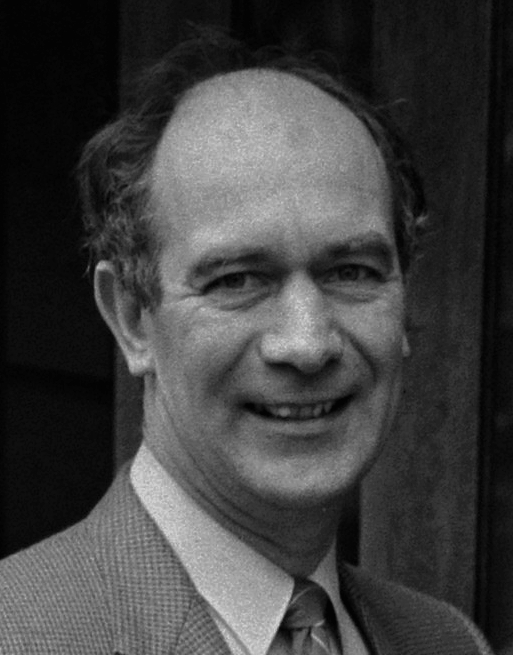
- De Vries in 1984

Chairman of the Christian Democratic Appeal
- In office 10 October 2001 – 2 November 2002
- Leader: Jan Peter Balkenende
- Preceded by: Marnix van Rij
- Succeeded by: Marja van Bijsterveldt

Member of the Social and Economic Council
- In office 15 July 1995 – 20 January 2001
- Chairman: See list: Theo Quené (1995–1996) Klaas de Vries (1996–1998) Herman Wijffels (1999–2001)

Minister of Agriculture, Nature and Fisheries
- In office 18 September 1990 – 28 September 1990; Ad interim
- Prime Minister: Ruud Lubbers
- Preceded by: Gerrit Braks
- Succeeded by: Piet Bukman

Minister of Social Affairs and Employment
- In office 7 November 1989 – 22 August 1994
- Prime Minister: Ruud Lubbers
- Preceded by: Jan de Koning
- Succeeded by: Ad Melkert

Parliamentary leader in the House of Representatives
- In office 14 July 1986 – 14 September 1989
- Preceded by: Ruud Lubbers
- Succeeded by: Ruud Lubbers
- In office 4 November 1982 – 3 June 1986
- Preceded by: Ruud Lubbers
- Succeeded by: Ruud Lubbers
- Parliamentary group: Christian Democratic Appeal

Member of the House of Representatives
- In office 21 November 1978 – 7 November 1989
- Parliamentary group: Christian Democratic Appeal (1980–1989); Anti-Revolutionary Party (1978–1980)

Personal details
- Born: Berend de Vries; 29 March 1938 (age 88) Groningen, Netherlands
- Party: Christian Democratic Appeal (1980–2010)
- Other political affiliations: Independent Christian Democrat (from 2010); Anti-Revolutionary Party (until 1980)
- Spouse: Dieuwke van der Helm (m. 1969)
- Education: University of Groningen (Bachelor of Economics, Master of Economics); Free University Amsterdam (Doctor of Philosophy)
- Occupation: Politician; civil servant; economist; researcher; financial analyst; tax collector; corporate director; nonprofit director; trade association executive; lobbyist; activist; professor

Berend "Bert" de Vries (born 29 March 1938) is a retired Dutch politician of the Christian Democratic Appeal (CDA) party and economist.

De Vries attended a Lyceum in Groningen from April 1950 until May 1958 and applied at the Rijksbelastingacademie in Rotterdam in June 1958 for a training as a tax collector graduating in August 1959 and simultaneously applied at the University of Groningen in July 1958 majoring in Economics and obtaining a Bachelor of Economics degree in June 1960 and worked as student researcher before graduating with a Master of Economics degree in July 1964. De Vries worked as a civil servant for the Province of Groningen as a tax collector for the Tax and Customs Administration from August 1959 until July 1964 and as a financial analyst for Philips in Eindhoven from July 1964 until January 1968. De Vries applied at the Free University Amsterdam in January 1968 for a postgraduate education in Financial economics and got a doctorate as a Doctor of Philosophy in Financial economics in July 1970. De Vries worked as a researcher at the Erasmus University Rotterdam from May 1968 until November 1978. De Vries served on the Anti-Revolutionary Party Executive Board from March 1975 until November 1978.

De Vries became a Member of the House of Representatives after the resignation of Willem Aantjes, taking office on 21 November 1978 serving as a frontbencher and spokesperson for Economic Affairs, Social Affairs, Civil Service, Small business, Provincial Government Affairs and deputy spokesperson for Social Work and Local Government Affairs. After the election of 1982 the Leader of the Christian Democratic Appeal and Parliamentary leader of the Christian Democratic Appeal in the House of Representatives Ruud Lubbers became Prime Minister in te Cabinet Lubbers I, the Christian Democratic Appeal leadership approached De Vries as his successor as Parliamentary leader, De Vries accepted and became the Parliamentary leader, taking office on 4 November 1982. After the election of 1986 Lubbers returned as Parliamentary leader on 3 June 1986 but following the cabinet formation of 1986 Lubbers continued as prime minister in the Cabinet Lubbers II and De Vries was approached to remain as Parliamentary leader, taking office on 14 July 1986. As Parliamentary leader of the largest party in the House of Representatives he also chaired the parliamentary committee for Intelligence and Security. After the election of 1989 Lubbers again returned as Parliamentary leader on 14 September 1989. Following the cabinet formation of 1989 De Vries was appointed as Minister of Social Affairs and Employment in the Cabinet Lubbers III, taking office on 7 November 1989. De Vries served as acting Minister of Agriculture, Nature and Fisheries from 18 September 1990 until 28 September 1990 following the resignation of Gerrit Braks. In December 1993 De Vries announced his retirement from national politics and that he wouldn't stand for the election of 1994. The Cabinet Lubbers III was replaced by the Cabinet Kok I following the cabinet formation of 1994 on 22 August 1994.

De Vries semi-retired from national politics and became active in the private sector and public sector and occupied numerous seats as a corporate director and nonprofit director on several boards of directors and supervisory boards (Unilever, Energy Research Centre, Tinbergen Institute, NIBC Bank and Arcadis) and served on several state commissions and councils on behalf of the government (Public Pension Funds APB, Sociale Verzekeringsbank, Raad voor Cultuur, Statistics Netherlands, Cadastre Agency, Social Employment Act Commission and the Social and Economic Council). De Vries also worked as a trade association executive for the Nederlandse Vereniging van Ziekenhuizen serving as chairman of the executive board from June 1995 until August 2001 and as an advocate, lobbyist and activist for the Anti-war movement, Human rights and the Two-state solution for the Israeli–Palestinian conflict. De Vries also served as a distinguished professor of Financial economics at the Erasmus University Rotterdam from 1 December 1994 until 1 December 1998. De Vries served as Chairman of the Christian Democratic Appeal from 10 October 2001 until 2 November 2002 following the resignation of Marnix van Rij.

De Vries is known for his abilities as a negotiator and manager. De Vries continued to comment on political affairs until his retirement in 2018 and holds the distinction as the second longest-serving Parliamentary leader of the Christian Democratic Appeal in the House of Representatives with 6 years, 273 days.

== Biography ==
=== Early life ===
Berend de Vries was born in Groningen. His father had a detective agency. As a student, he was employed to assist in observation work, for collecting evidence of adultery. After the Mulo he was an official of the IRS. In the evening he attended the HBS. As a working student, he attended the study economics at the University of Groningen and he received a Master of Economics degree. Through the work at Groningen, he joined Philips, where he worked in the finance department. Thereafter (from 1968 to 1978) he worked at the Erasmus University. At the same time he received his PhD in Economic Sciences at the Vrije Universiteit.

=== Politics ===
In 1978 he was elected as a member of the Anti-Revolutionary Party as a Member of the House of Representatives. In 1982 he became leader of the CDA. He ruled the fraction with an iron fist and did not allow dissidents. Group Members Jan Nico Scholten and Stef Dijkman had to leave in 1983. As minister he steered the Arbeidsvoorzieningswet and Jeugdwerkgarantiewet by the First and Second Chamber. He was also the architect of the so-called Bami agreement on adaptation of the WAO. The name Bami agreement refers to the fact that during the consultations in the home of Bert de Vries, a meal of Chinese take-away food was consumed. With this agreement, the fall of the third Lubbers cabinet prevented.

After his departure from active politics until 1998 he was part-time professor of financial and economic policy at the Erasmus University in Rotterdam. After the forced resignation of Marnix van Rij in 2001, De Vries took over as chairman of the Christian Democratic Appeal for a year.

== Decorations ==
Honours
Ribbon bar	Honour	Country	Date	Comment
	Grand Cross of the Order of the Crown	Belgium	10 December 1990	
	Commander of the Legion of Honour	France	1 October 1991	
	Knight Commander of the Order of Merit	Germany	21 March 1993	
	Grand Officer of the Order of Bernardo O'Higgins	Chile	5 August 1993	
	Knight of the Order of the Netherlands Lion	Netherlands	8 October 1994	
	Commander of the Order of Orange-Nassau	Netherlands	30 April 1999	

Party political offices
Preceded by Ruud Lubbers	Parliamentary leader of the Christian Democratic Appeal in the House of Representatives; 1982–1986; 1986–1989	Succeeded by Ruud Lubbers
Preceded by Marnix van Rij	Chairman of the Christian; Democratic Appeal; 2001–2002	Succeeded by Marja van Bijsterveldt
Political offices
Preceded by Jan de Koning	Minister of Social Affairs and Employment; 1989–1994	Succeeded by Ad Melkert
Preceded by Gerrit Braks	Minister of Agriculture, Nature and Fisheries; Ad interim 1990	Succeeded by Piet Bukman
Civic offices
Preceded by Wil Albeda	Chairman of the Supervisory board of National Insurance Bank; 1994–2001	Succeeded by Bram Peper
Preceded by Gijs van Aardenne	Chairman of the Supervisory board of Public Pension Funds APB; 1995–2001	Succeeded by Elco Brinkman
Business positions
Preceded by Gijs van Aardenne	Chairman of the Executive Board of the Hospitals association 1995–2001	Succeeded by Jo Ritzen
