= 2012 Labour Party leadership election (Netherlands) =

- 16 March 2012
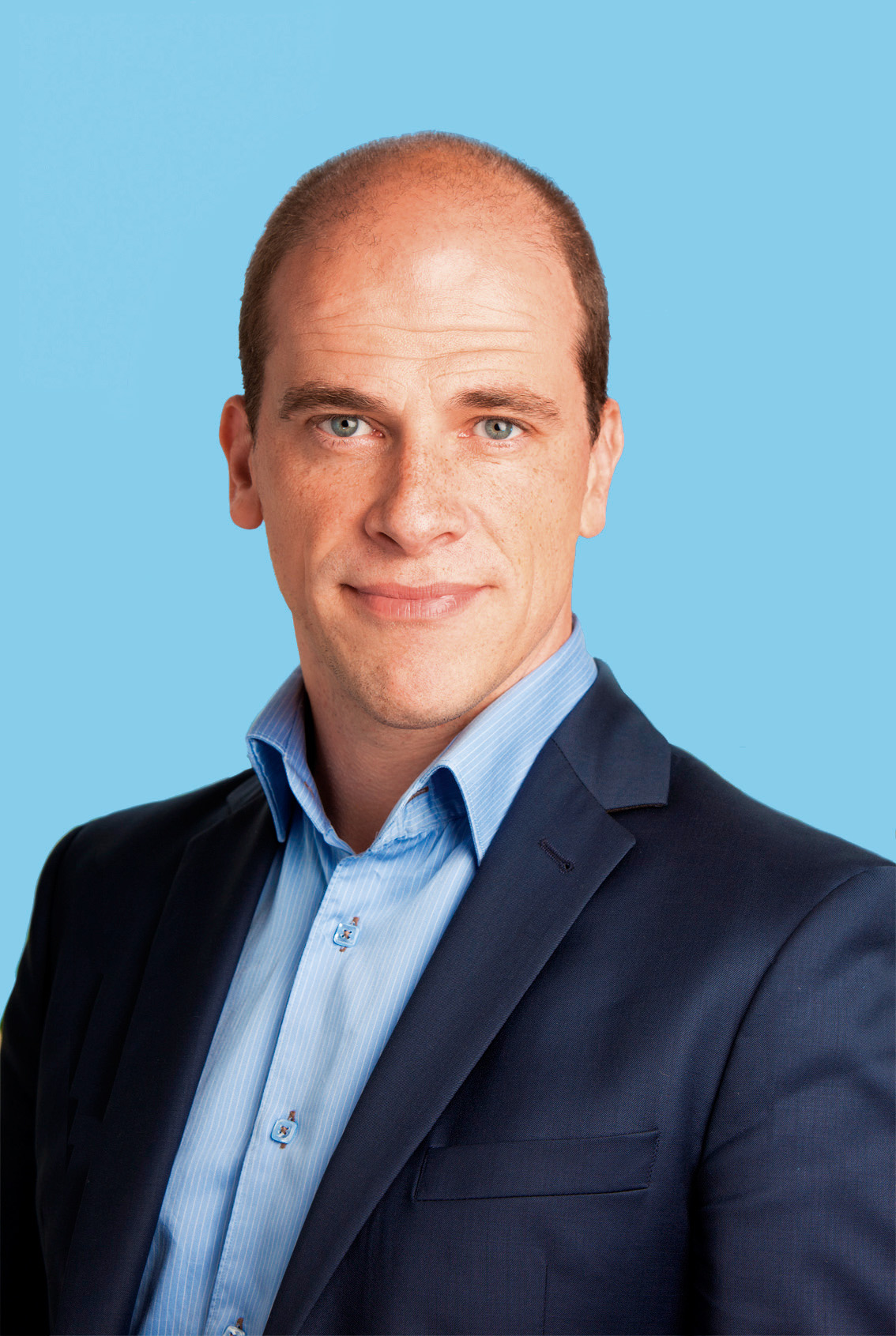

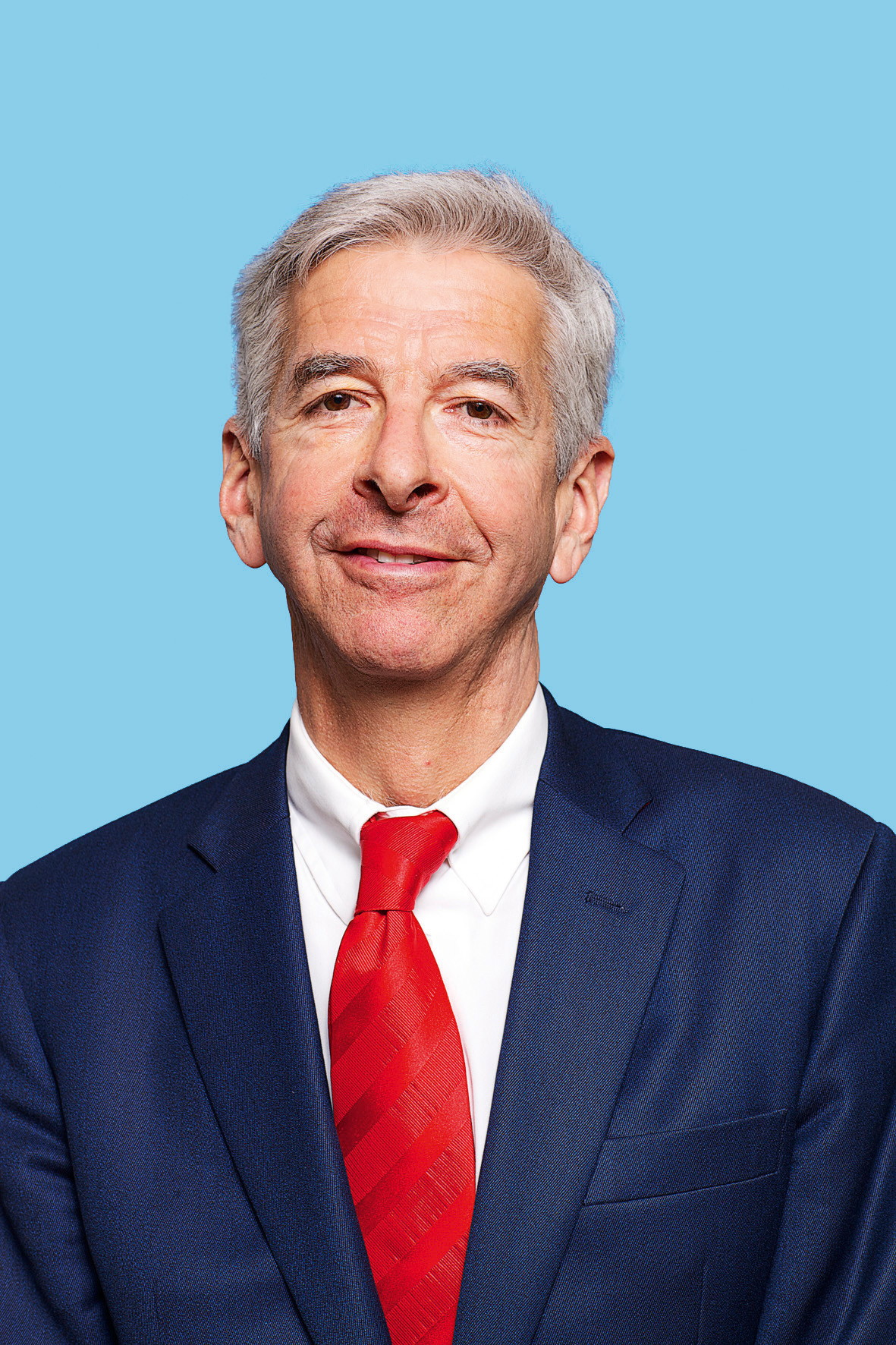

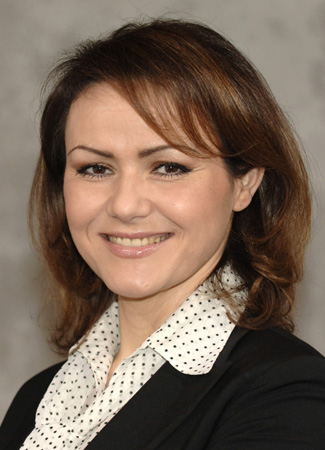

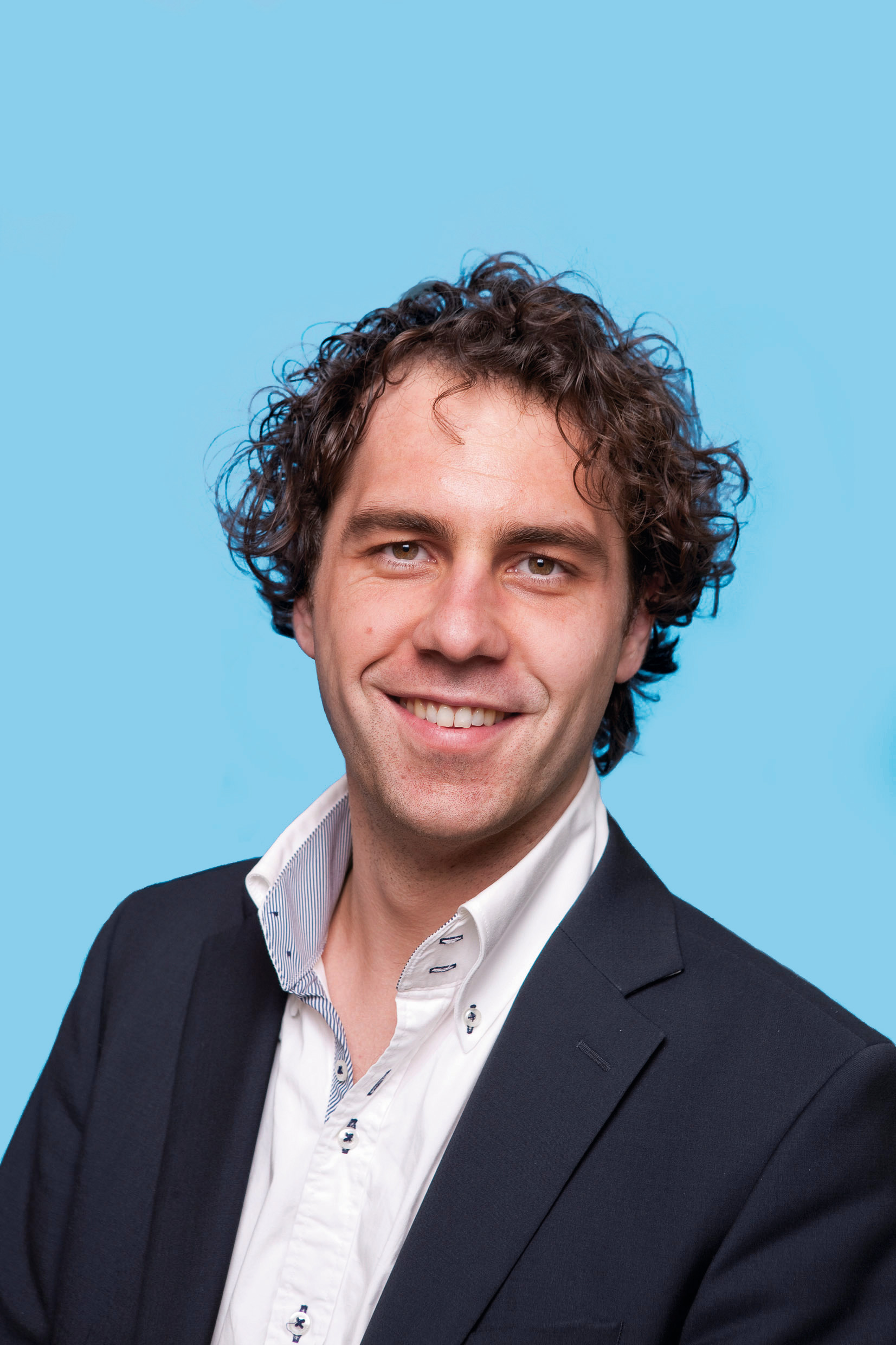

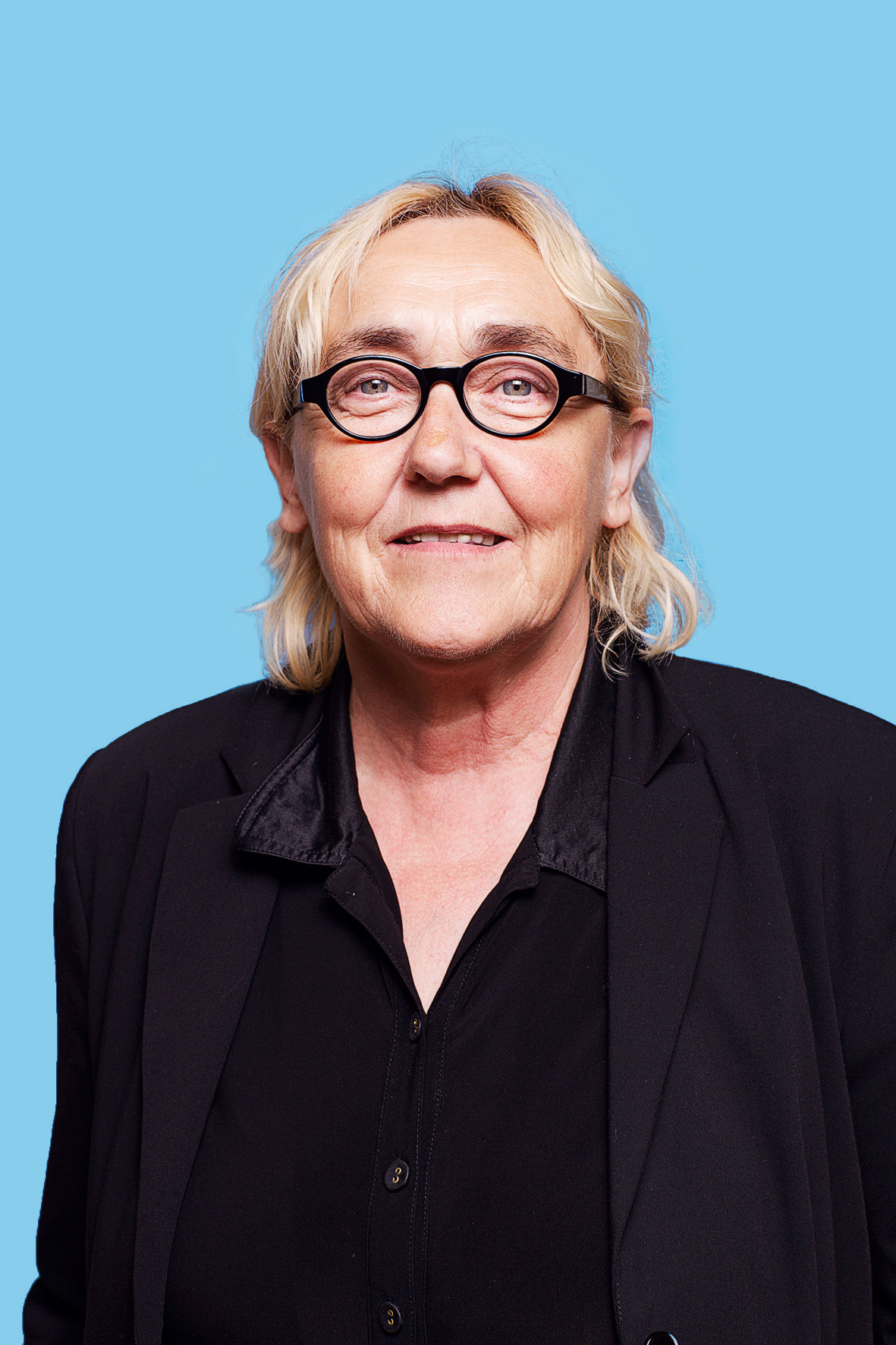
| Candidate | Diederik Samsom | Ronald Plasterk | Nebahat Albayrak |
| Popular vote | 19,524 | 11,427 | 2,968 |
| Percentage | 54.0% | 31.6% | 8.2% |
| Candidate | Martijn van Dam | Lutz Jacobi |
| Popular vote | 1,410 | 815 |
| Percentage | 3.9% | 2.3% |
Leader before election
Job Cohen
Leader-elect
Diederik Samsom

The 2012 Labour Party leadership election was called to elect the new Leader of the Labour Party after incumbent Job Cohen announced his retirement from national politics. Cohen had been the leader of the party since 25 April 2010 after the resignation of Wouter Bos. Diederik Samsom a Member of the House of Representatives beat former Minister of Education, Culture and Science Ronald Plasterk, former Undersecretary for Justice Nebahat Albayrak, Member of the House of Representatives Martijn van Dam, and backbencher Member of the House of Representatives Lutz Jacobi with 54.0% of the votes.
