= 2016 Labour Party leadership election (Netherlands) =

- 28 November 2016 – 8 December 2016
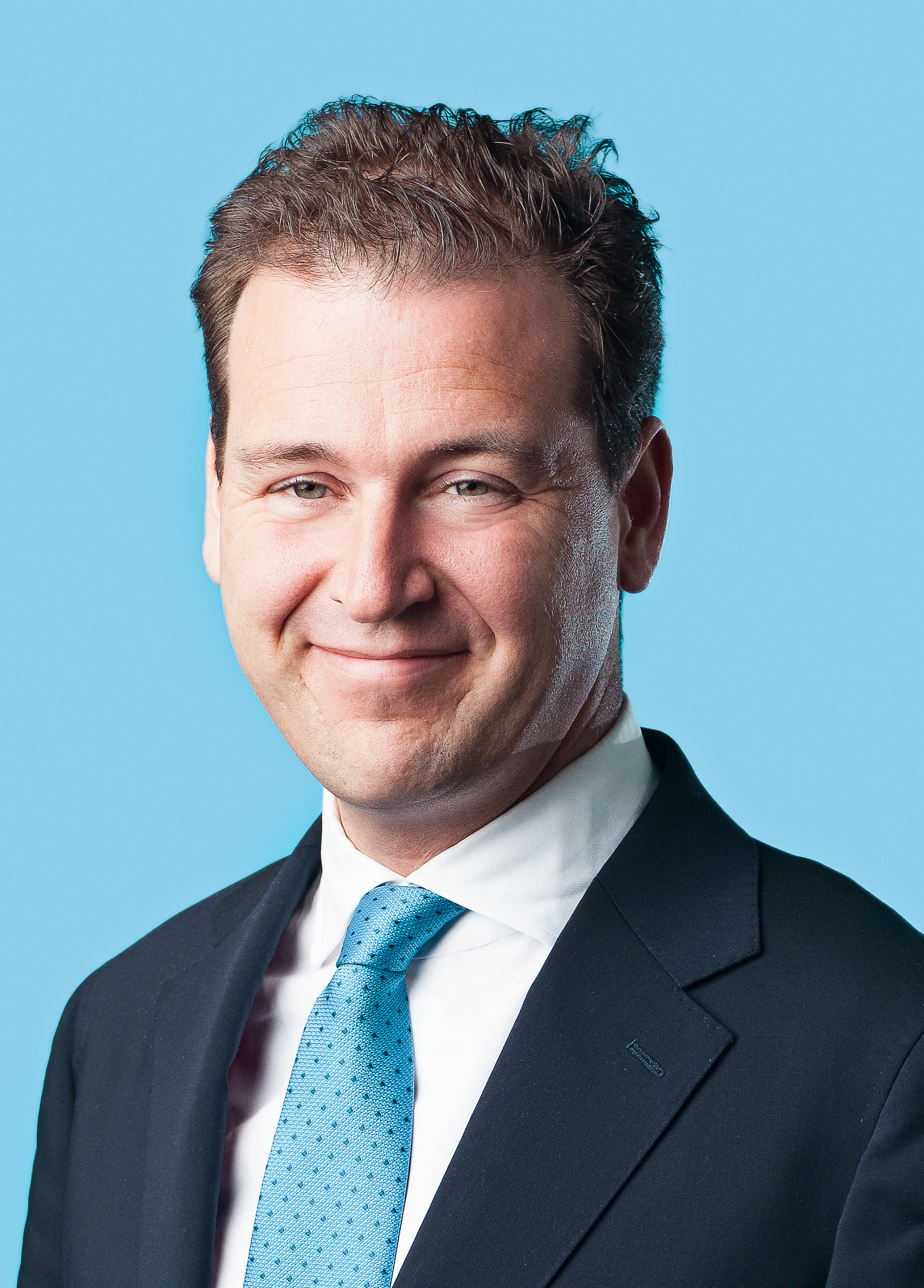

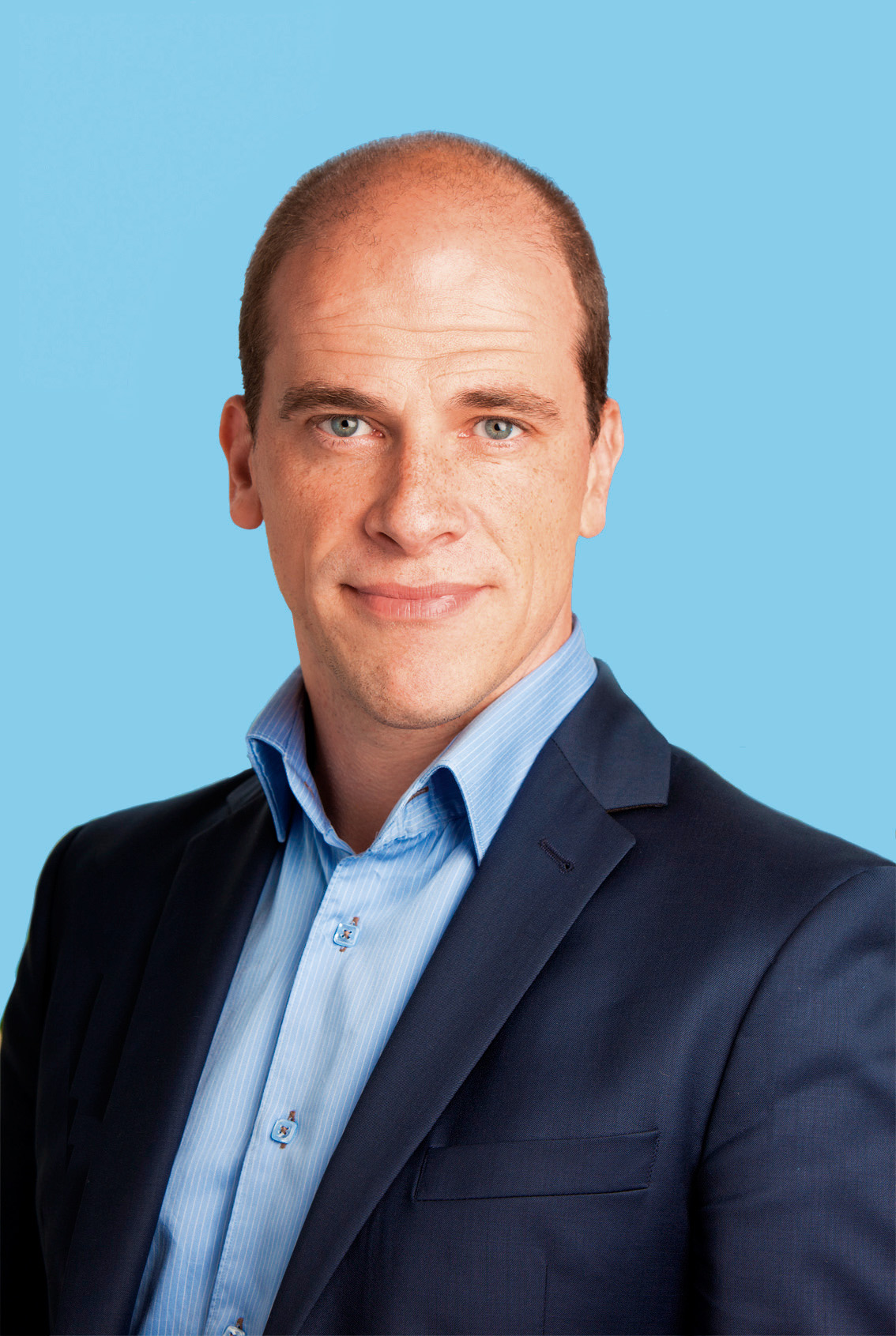
Candidate	Lodewijk Asscher	Diederik Samsom
Popular vote	54.5%	45.5%
Leader before election
Diederik Samsom
Leader-elect
Lodewijk Asscher

The 2016 Labour Party leadership election was called to elect the new Leader of the Labour Party after incumbent Diederik Samsom announced a leadership election to select the lijsttrekker (top candidate) for the general election of 2017. Lodewijk Asscher beat Samsom by 54.5% to 45.5%.

== Procedure ==
The final list of candidates was published on 7 November; voting started on 28 November and closed on 8 December. A day after, the results were announced. Each of the party's ca. 45,000 members were given a vote in the leadership election. Additionally, any Dutch citizen was able to purchase a temporary membership for 2 euros and gain access to the election within days of their registration.
