= Lilianne Ploumen =

Dutch politician and activist (born 1962)

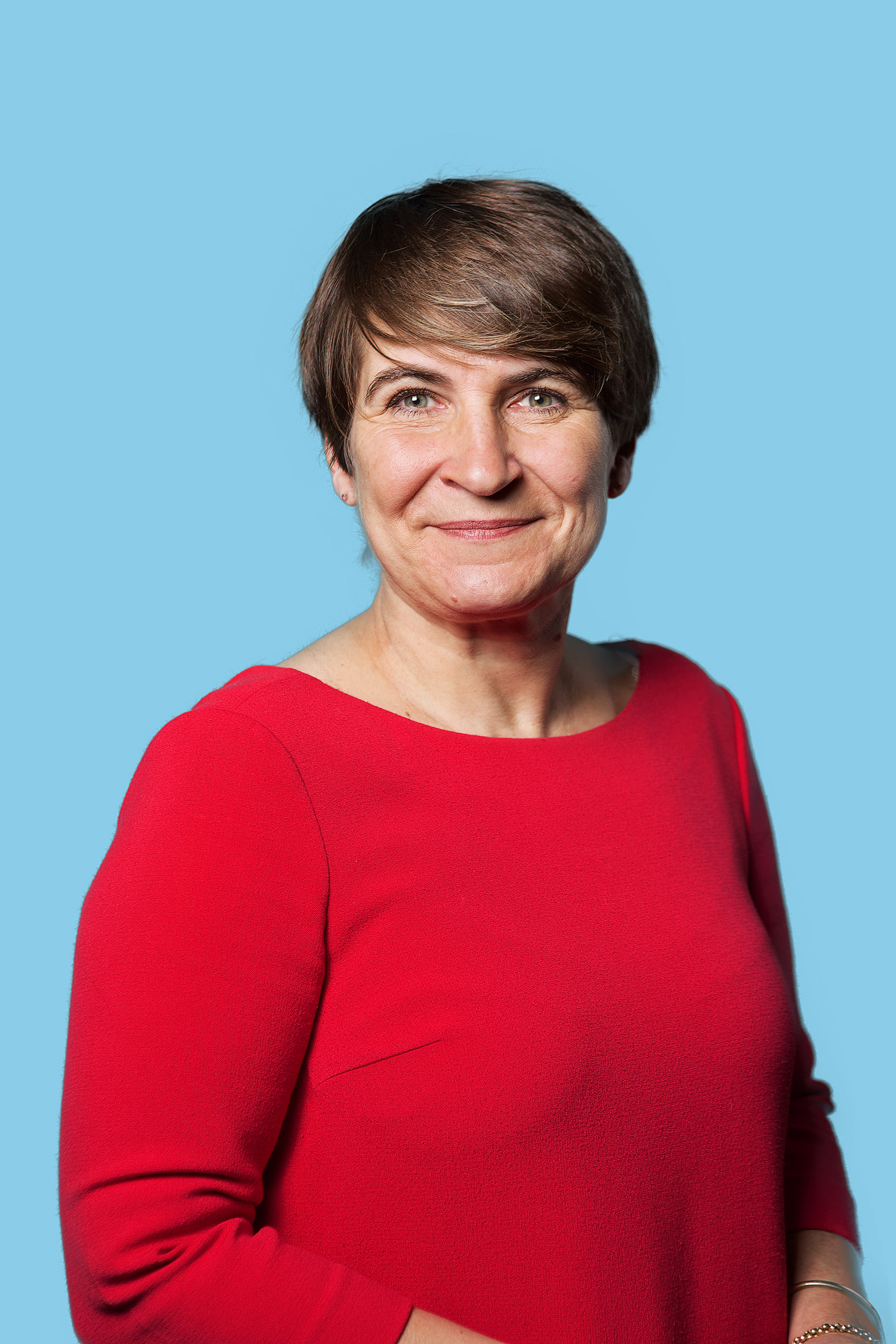
- Ploumen in 2017

Member of the House of Representatives
- In office 23 March 2017 – 22 April 2022

Leader of the Labour Party
- In office 23 January 2021 – 12 April 2022
- Preceded by: Lodewijk Asscher
- Succeeded by: Attje Kuiken

Leader of the Labour Party in the House of Representatives
- In office 14 January 2021 – 12 April 2022
- Preceded by: Lodewijk Asscher
- Succeeded by: Attje Kuiken

Minister for Foreign Trade and Development Cooperation
- In office 5 November 2012 – 26 October 2017
- Prime Minister: Mark Rutte
- Preceded by: Maxime Verhagen (Development Cooperation, 2010)
- Succeeded by: Sigrid Kaag

Chair of the Labour Party
- In office 6 October 2007 – 22 January 2012
- Leader: Wouter Bos; Job Cohen
- Preceded by: Michiel van Hulten
- Succeeded by: Hans Spekman

Personal details
- Born: Elisabeth Maria Josepha Ploumen; 12 July 1962 (age 64) Maastricht, Netherlands
- Party: GL (before 2002); PvdA (since 2003)
- Education: Erasmus University Rotterdam (BA, MA)

Elisabeth Maria Josepha "Lilianne" Ploumen DCSG (Dutch pronunciation: [eːˈlisaːbɛt maːˈrijaː joːˈseːfaː liliˈjɑnə ˈplumə(n)]; born 12 July 1962) is a Dutch politician and activist who served as Leader of the Labour Party from January 2021 until April 2022. She had been a member of the House of Representatives since 2017, as well as parliamentary leader since 2021, leaving the House of Representatives upon her resignation as party leader. Ploumen previously served as Minister for Foreign Trade and Development Cooperation from 2012 to 2017.

== Early life and career ==
Ploumen was born in Maastricht on 12 July 1962.

In 1983, while still at university, Ploumen became a community outreach worker in the Crooswijk area of Rotterdam. Two years later she joined the Institute of Psychological Market Research (IPM), a research-based consultancy, working in the statistics department as a research project leader. From 1990 to 1992 she was a marketing and research manager for Foster Parents Plan in Amsterdam. Ploumen then moved to Plan, the London-based umbrella organization, in 1993. In 1995 she founded Ploumen Projecten, an organization specializing in market research and innovation for commercial and non-profit clients.

Ploumen was director of Mama Cash and worked for Cordaid as head of quality and strategy and subsequently as director of international programmes.

== Political career ==
Ploumen became a member of the Labour Party in 2003.

She was the chairwoman of the Labour Party from 6 October 2007, after she beat former Minister of Housing, Spatial Planning and the Environment Jan Pronk with 54% of the vote. She resigned from this post on 22 January 2012 and was succeeded by Hans Spekman.

Ploumen served as Minister for Foreign Trade and Development Cooperation in the second Rutte cabinet from 5 November 2012 until 2017.

Early on in her tenure, Ploumen and Secretary of State of Finance Frans Weekers submitted a proposal in 2013 to renegotiate the Netherlands’ tax treaties with 23 least-developed countries. Their move was widely seen as marking a turning point for a country that long deflected accusations that it is a key player in tax avoidance by multinational corporations. With their proposal, Ploumen and Weekers followed the recommendations of a government-commissioned report which, for the first time, agreed with tax-justice groups that developing countries miss out on substantial tax revenues because of their treaties with the Netherlands.

During her time in office, Ploumen increased the Netherlands' support to the GAVI vaccination alliance, from €200 million to €250 million for period from 2016 until 2020. Between 2014 and 2016, she co-chaired the Global Partnership for Effective Development Co-Operation (alongside José Antonio Meade Kuribreña). She also served a two-year term as member of the World Bank Group’s (WBG) Advisory Council on Gender and Development from 2015 until 2017.

In January 2016, Ploumen headed an official Dutch delegation to Cuba, including some 60 businesses. During the trip, it was announced that global consumer products company Unilever would return to Cuba after a several-year absence, agreeing to build a $35 million soap and toothpaste factory in Cuba’s special development zone at the port of Mariel west of Havana.

Most notably, however, Ploumen started the "She Decides" campaign, an initiative of about 50 countries, organizations and foundations to finance global family planning initiatives after a U.S. halt to such programs left NGOs worldwide with a large funding gap. Within six months the organization received pledges worth US$300 million. As minister, she pledged 10 million euro to counter the Mexico City policy.

Following the 2014 European elections, international news media widely considered Ploumen one of the candidates for the nomination to become the Netherlands’ member of the European Commission; the post eventually went to Frans Timmermans.

In the Dutch elections in 2017, in which the PvdA won nine seats, Ploumen was tenth on the electoral list, but due to preferential votes still won a seat in the Dutch House of Representatives.

On 12 April 2022, Ploumen resigned as both leader of the Labour Party and as member of the Dutch House of Representatives. In a statement explaining her decision, she stated to "not feel at home" in her role as party leader. She later started advising Bureau Clara Wichmann, a legal fund to advance women's rights, where she is investigating conditions in women's prisons.

== Other activities ==
=== Corporate boards ===
- Opzij, Member of the Board

=== International organizations ===
- African Development Bank (AfDB), Ex-Officio Member of the Board of Governors
- Asian Development Bank (ADB), Ex-Officio Member of the Board of Governors
- European Bank for Reconstruction and Development (EBRD), Ex-Officio Alternate Member of the Board of Governors
- Inter-American Investment Corporation (IIC), Ex-Officio Member of the Board of Governors
- Multilateral Investment Guarantee Agency (MIGA), World Bank Group, Ex-Officio Alternate Member of the Board of Governors
- World Bank, Ex-Officio Alternate Member of the Board of Governors

=== Non-profit organizations ===
- European Council on Foreign Relations (ECFR), Member of the Council
- Stop Aids Now!, Member of the Supervisory Board
- Women Inc., Member of the Board

== Recognition ==
- 2017 – Dame Commander of the Order of St. Gregory the Great (Holy See)
- 2018 – Aletta Jacobs Prize

Party political offices
Preceded by Michiel van Hulten	Chair of the Labour Party; 2007–2012	Succeeded by Hans Spekman
Preceded by Lodewijk Asscher	Leader of the Labour Party in the House of Representatives; 2021–2022	Succeeded by Attje Kuiken
Preceded by Lodewijk Asscher	Leader of the Labour Party; 2021–2022	Succeeded by TBD
Political offices
Vacant Title last held by Maxime Verhagen; 2010 as Minister for Development Cooperation	Minister for Foreign Trade and Development Cooperation; 2012-2017	Succeeded by Sigrid Kaag
