= List of rectores magnifici of Maastricht University =

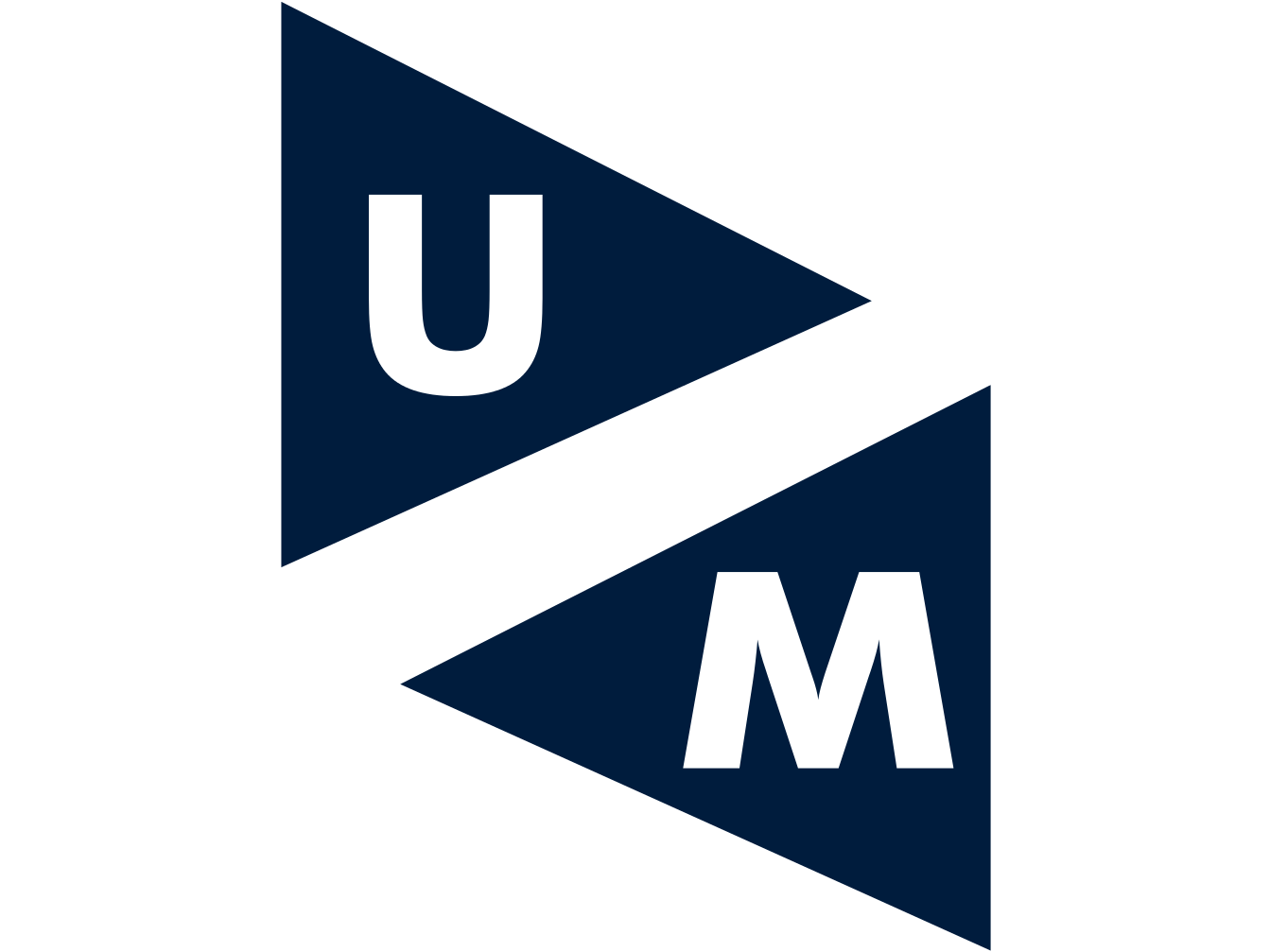
Logo Maastricht University

A rector of a Dutch university is called a rector magnificus. The following people have been rector magnificus of the Maastricht University:

Period	Rector magnificus	Image
1976-1979	Harmen Tiddens	
1979–1981	Wynand Wijnen	
1982–1985	H.C. (“Coen”) Hemker	
1985-1991	Vic Bonke	
1991-1993	Job Cohen	
1993-1995	Hans Philipsen	
1995-1997	Job Cohen	
1998-2003	Arie Nieuwenhuizen Kruseman	
2004-2012	Gerard Mols	
2012-2016	Luc Soete	
2016-2022	Rianne Letschert	
2022-2026	Pamela Habibović	
