= Floris Cohen =

Dutch historian of science (born 1946

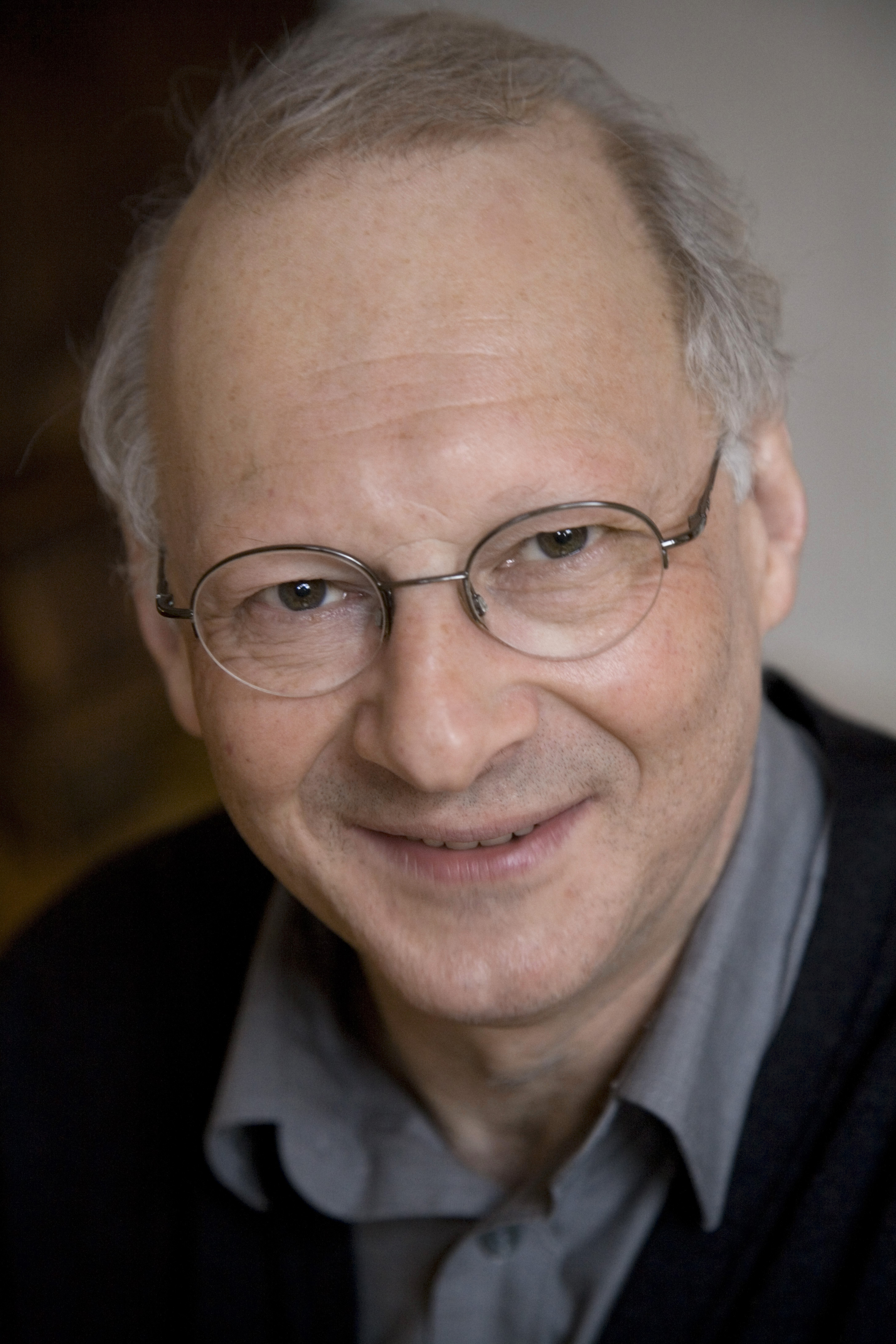
Floris Cohen in 2010

Hendrik Floris Cohen (born 1 July 1946) is a Dutch historian of science.

== Life ==
Hendrik Floris Cohen was born in Haarlem, the Netherlands, on 1 July 1946. He studied history at the University of Leiden, receiving a Ph.D. in 1974. He is a professor in the Comparative History of Science at the University of Utrecht. Cohen is the brother of the politician Job Cohen and son of the historian Dolf Cohen (1913–2004). Hendrik Cohen is his grandfather.

In 2008, Cohen was awarded the Dutch "Eureka" prize for the best book of the year that makes science accessible to a wide audience.

== Bibliography ==
- Cohen, Hendrik Floris (31 May 1984). Quantifying Music: The Science of Music at the First Stage of Scientific Revolution 1580–1650. Netherlands: Springer Netherlands. ISBN 9789027716378.
- Cohen, Hendrik Floris (3 October 1994). The Scientific Revolution: A Historiographical Inquiry. United Kingdom: University of Chicago Press. ISBN 9780226112794.
- Cohen, Hendrik Floris (2010). How Modern Science Came Into the World: Four Civilizations, One 17th-Century Breakthrough. Netherlands: Amsterdam University Press. doi:10.4324/9781003697534. ISBN 9789089642394.
- Cohen, Hendrik Floris (24 September 2015). The Rise of Modern Science Explained: A Comparative History. Cambridge: Cambridge University Press. doi:10.1017/CBO9781316340851. ISBN 9781107120068.
