= Rien van der Velde =

Dutch politician

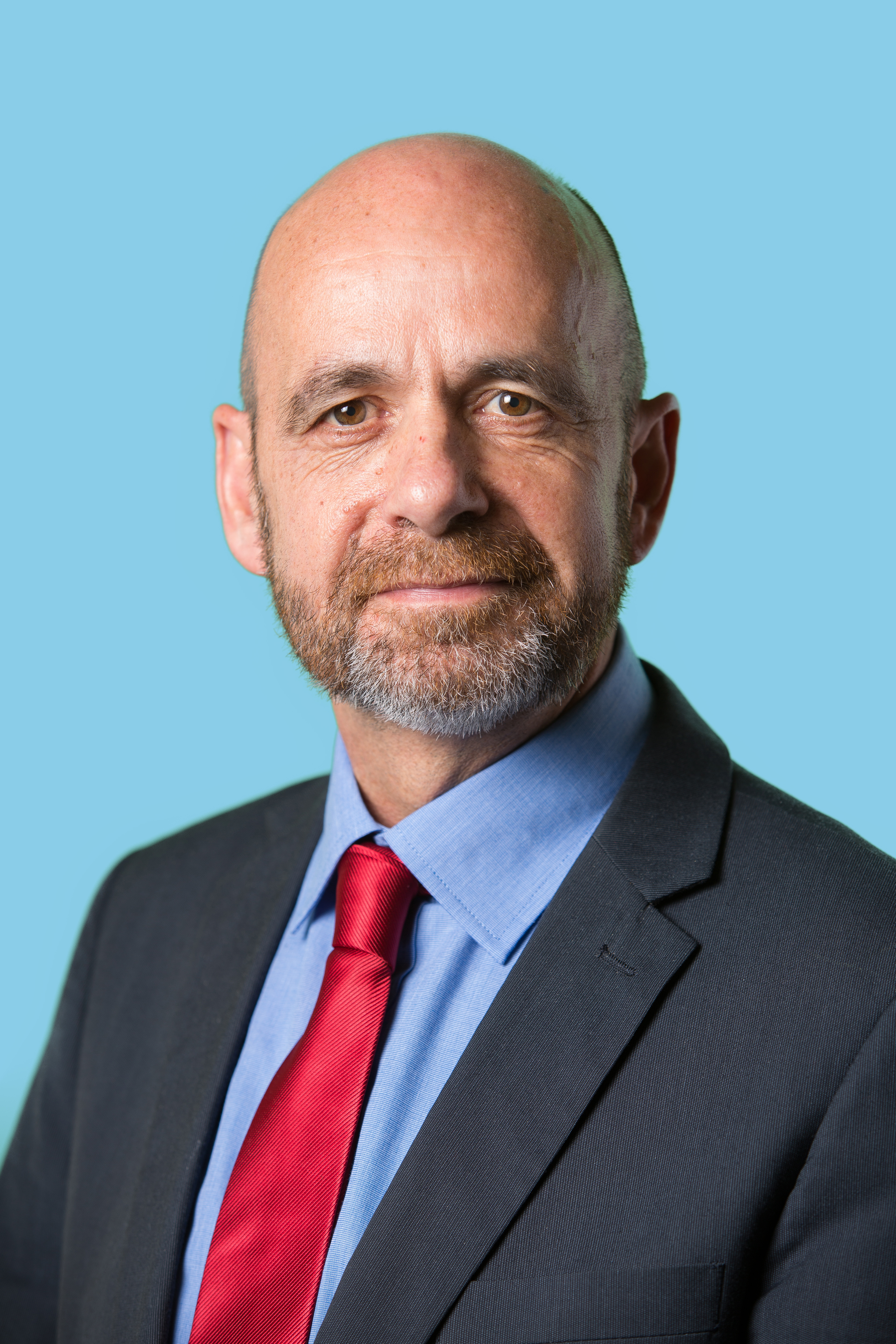
- Rien van der Velde in 2016

Member of the House of Representatives
- In office 25 October 2016 – 23 March 2017

Member of the municipal council of Noordoostpolder
- Incumbent
- Assumed office 11 March 2010

Personal details
- Born: Rink van der Velde; 21 February 1957 (age 69) Nagele, Netherlands
- Party: Labour Party

Rink "Rien" van der Velde (born 21 February 1957) is a Dutch politician. He was a member of the House of Representatives of the Netherlands for the Labour Party between 25 October 2016 and 23 March 2017. He entered the House as a temporary replacement of Sjoera Dikkers. On 14 December 2016 he became a permanent member of the House when he took the place of the resigned parliamentary group leader Diederik Samsom. He has served in the municipal council of Noordoostpolder since 2010. He serves as council leader of the combination Labour Party/GreenLeft.

Van der Velde is a lecturer at Van Hall Larenstein since September 2006. He also owns an education institute.

Van der Velde was number 51 on the Labour Party list for the 2012 Dutch general election.
