= Coen Hemker =

Dutch biochemist and academic administrator

- Born: Hendrik Coenraad Hemker; 21 July 1934 (age 92); Amsterdam, the Netherlands
- Occupation: Biochemist
- Awards: Ernst Jung Prize for Medicine (1985)

Academic background
- Education: University of Amsterdam
- Thesis: Mechanisme van de werking van ontkoppelende fenolen op de ademhalingsketen-fosforylering (1962)
- Doctoral advisor: Edward Slater

Academic work
- Institutions: Leiden University, Maastricht University
- Main interests: thrombosis, hemostasis

Hendrik Coenraad "Coen" Hemker (born 21 July 1934) is a Dutch biochemist and academic administrator. He was one of the founders of Maastricht University and was its rector magnificus from 1982 to 1984. He was a professor of biochemistry from 1975 until 1999. In his research he has mainly studied thrombosis and hemostasis.

== Early life and career ==
Hemker was born on 21 July 1934 in Amsterdam. With his mother being a heart patient and his father spending a lot of time on his hobbies, Hemker frequently looked after his four younger brothers. He subsequently wanted to study pediatrics but was advised by Dutch pediatrician Simon van Creveld to study biochemistry for a year. Hemker obtained his medical degree from the University of Amsterdam in 1959. Academically he performed well and he was asked to continue his studies so he could obtain a PhD. By this time he thoroughly liked performing research and accepted the offer. He obtained his PhD in biochemistry in 1962 at the University of Amsterdam under Edward Slater with a thesis titled: Mechanisme van de werking van ontkoppelende fenolen op de ademhalingsketen-fosforylering.

Hemker subsequently started his specialist training to become a pediatrician but stopped as he preferred doing research. He was then hired as a researcher at the hemostasis and thrombosis department of Leiden University. While in this position he was sent to Oxford for further training where he met Robert Gwyn Macfarlane. Macfarlane had developed a first theory of coagulation. Hemker doubted the validity of the theory and thought one of the enzymes played a different role. The two men found Hemker's idea was correct and they subsequently published their findings in Nature.

During the 1960s he worked on vitamin K research under professor E.A. Loeliger. He found a coagulant factor only occurring with the use of vitamin K antagonists or a vitamin K deficiency. Hemker became a lector of cardiology and professor of internal medicine at Leiden University in 1968.

== Career at Maastricht University ==
In the early 1970s, there were plans to establish a new university in the Netherlands, with Maastricht being named as a possible location. In 1973 Hemker was asked to join the project by political proponents of the plan, politician Sjeng Tans and Maastricht mayor Fons Baeten. In 1974 he was appointed and became part of a group of seven professors that prepared the founding of the Faculty of Medicine at the Rijksuniversiteit Limburg (later renamed Maastricht University). The group was responsible for the forming of the eight faculty of medicine in the Netherlands, but when their work commenced the urgent need for the faculty was already diminished which led to the search for a different profile for the university as compared to others. This was found in first line care, family medicine, and a new education concept. Hemker found that research did not receive sufficient attention. Hemker led a research group at Leiden University until 1975 when he formally moved to Maastricht University. At that point he became chair of the biochemistry department. At Maastricht his research group studied thrombosis and hemostasis. In 1976 he was the first promotor of a doctorate at Maastricht University. During his time at Maastricht problem-based learning was considered innovative at the institute, although Hemker was initially positive about this he later became neutral to negative on the approach. Between 1976 and 1985 Hemker was concurrently working as an unpaid part-time professor of biochemistry at Leiden University.

In the early 1980s, the economic outlook in the Netherlands was negative and Maastricht University was not yet perceived to be a fully qualified university by other universities and the political establishment and there was fear of budget cuts or even the disestablishment of the institute. Hemker put his own name forward for the position of rector magnificus of Maastricht University to strengthen the scientific profile of the university. Hemker has stated he took the opportunity to show the importance of research at a time when the university was focused on education. The university board of directors, led by Rob van den Biggelaar, did not look favorably upon his nomination. As the college of deans supported Hemker he obtained the position and served as rector from 1982 to 1984. Six months after laying down his position as rector Hemker was asked by Wim Deetman the Dutch Minister of Education and Sciences to become chairman of the university board of directors. He declined as he wanted to focus on his research.

After 1984 he took a sabbatical and became a visiting professor at the Paris Descartes University, Pierre and Marie Curie University and the Collège de France in Paris. During 1988 he started working full-time at Maastricht University again. In 1995 he academically clashed with one of his colleagues in such a way that the matter was brought before the university board. Hemker was subsequently reprimanded for not having separated his own business venture sufficiently from his work in the faculty. Hemker subsequently stated that he had been too lax with his administrative obligations. He was an affiliate professor of internal medicine at Mount Sinai School of Medicine between 1995 and 2005. Hemker officially retired from Maastricht University in 1999. The Hemker Fund was established in his name to promote scholarship into thrombosis and hemostasis. In 2009 a lecture hall at Maastricht University was named after him. During his career Hemker was (co-)promotor of 70 PhD's, including that of his own father when he was 70 years old.

== Research ==
In 1968 Hemker, in collaboration with Prof. R.G.Macfarlane (Oxford), found that prothrombin is converted into thrombin by two clotting proteins (factors Xa and Va) adsorbed next to each other on a membrane surface. In the same year that a similar mechanism describes how the antihemophilic factors (Factors VIIa and IXa) act. The detailed enzyme kinetics of these interactions was investigated later in collaboration with Rosing, Tans and Van Dieijen. The role of blood platelets in these processes was investigated in his lab by the groups of Zwaal and Béguin. A second line of research is the mode of action of antithrombotic drugs, both vitamin K antagonists and heparins. A third main subject developed in collaboration with S.Béguin, is the invention of an automated thrombin generation test as sensitive probe for the function of the hemostatic power and thrombotic tendency of the blood. Hemker has more than 500 scientific publications to his name and holds several dozen patents. He was the founder of the company Synapse, at which he continued to work after his retirement from Maastricht University.

== Awards and honours ==
Hemker was the winner of the 1968 Prix Européen Ganassini for his research on vitamin K coagulants. In 1985 he was recipient of the Ernst Jung Prize for Medicine. Hemker was elected a member of the Royal Netherlands Academy of Arts and Sciences in 1987. In the same year he was named a commander of the Ordre des Palmes académiques. Hemker was elected a member of the Academia Europaea in 1990. He became a Chevalier in the Legion of Honour in 1990. Hemker became a foreign honorary member of the Koninklijke Academie voor Geneeskunde van België in 1991. In 2000 he was made a Knight of the Order of the Netherlands Lion. In 2001 Hemker became a foreign member of the French Académie Nationale de Médecine. He was promoted to Officier in the Legion of Honour in 2011. In 2019 Hemker won the Dr. J.G.H. Tans Medal, the highest award of Maastricht University.

== Personal life ==
Hemker's wife is a psychiatrist and psychoanalyst. During the late 1980s Hemker suffered from severe ulcerative colitis, which led to him losing 20 kilograms and it nearly killed him. In an operation his large intestine was removed and Hemker subsequently recovered. Hemker wrote a cook book with chef Jacques Zeguers.
