= Leader of the Labour Party (Netherlands) =

The Leader of the Labour Party was the most senior politician within the Labour Party (Dutch: Partij van de Arbeid, PvdA) in the Netherlands.

The leaders outwardly acted as the 'figurehead' and the main representative of the party. Within the party, they were responsible for ensuring political consensus. At election time, the leader was always the lead candidate of the party list. Outside election time the leader could serve as the Leader of the Opposition. In the Labour Party the party leader was often also the parliamentary leader in the House of Representatives. Some leaders became a minister in the cabinet.

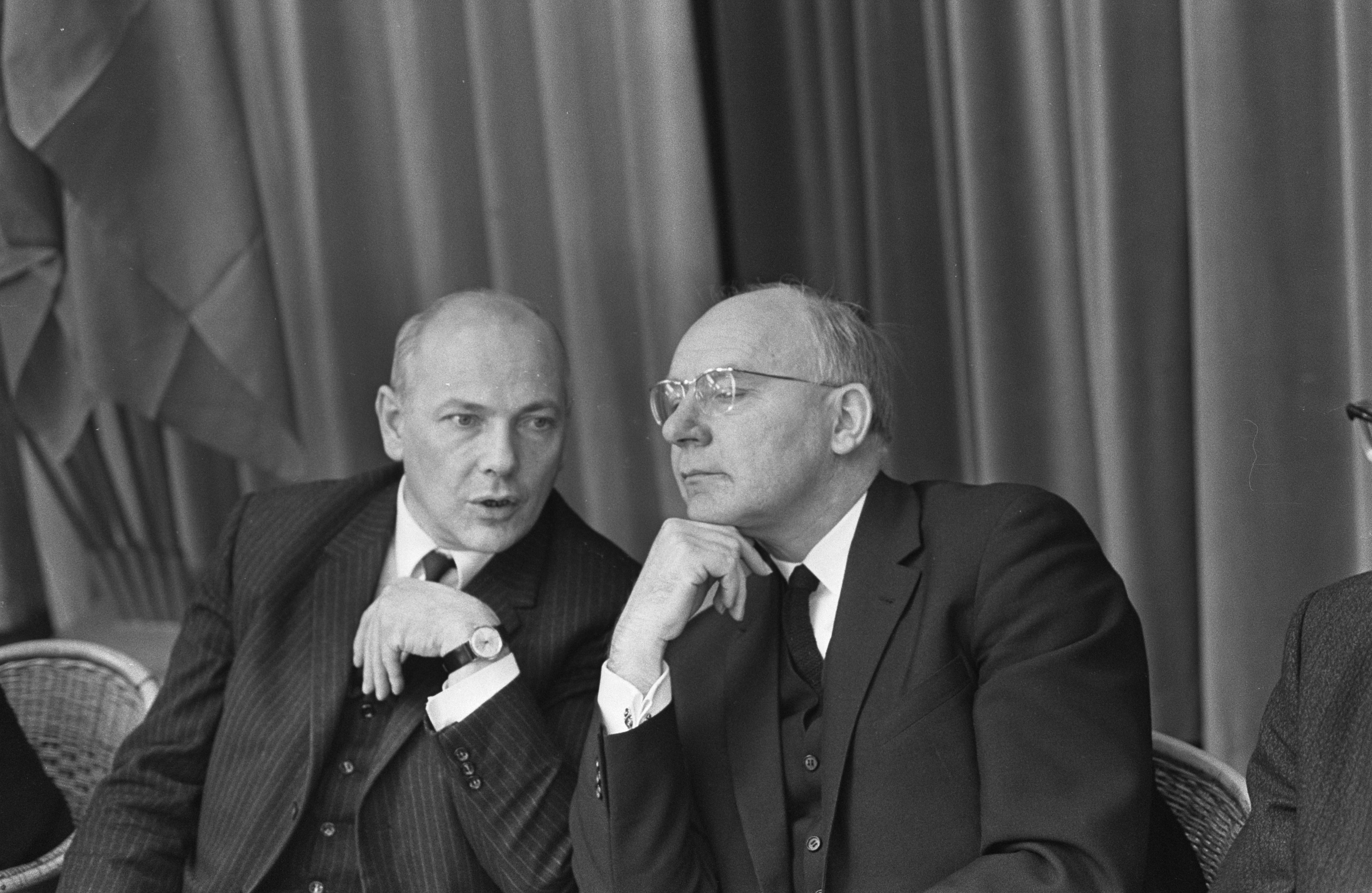
Joop den Uyl and Anne Vondeling on 11 November 1966.

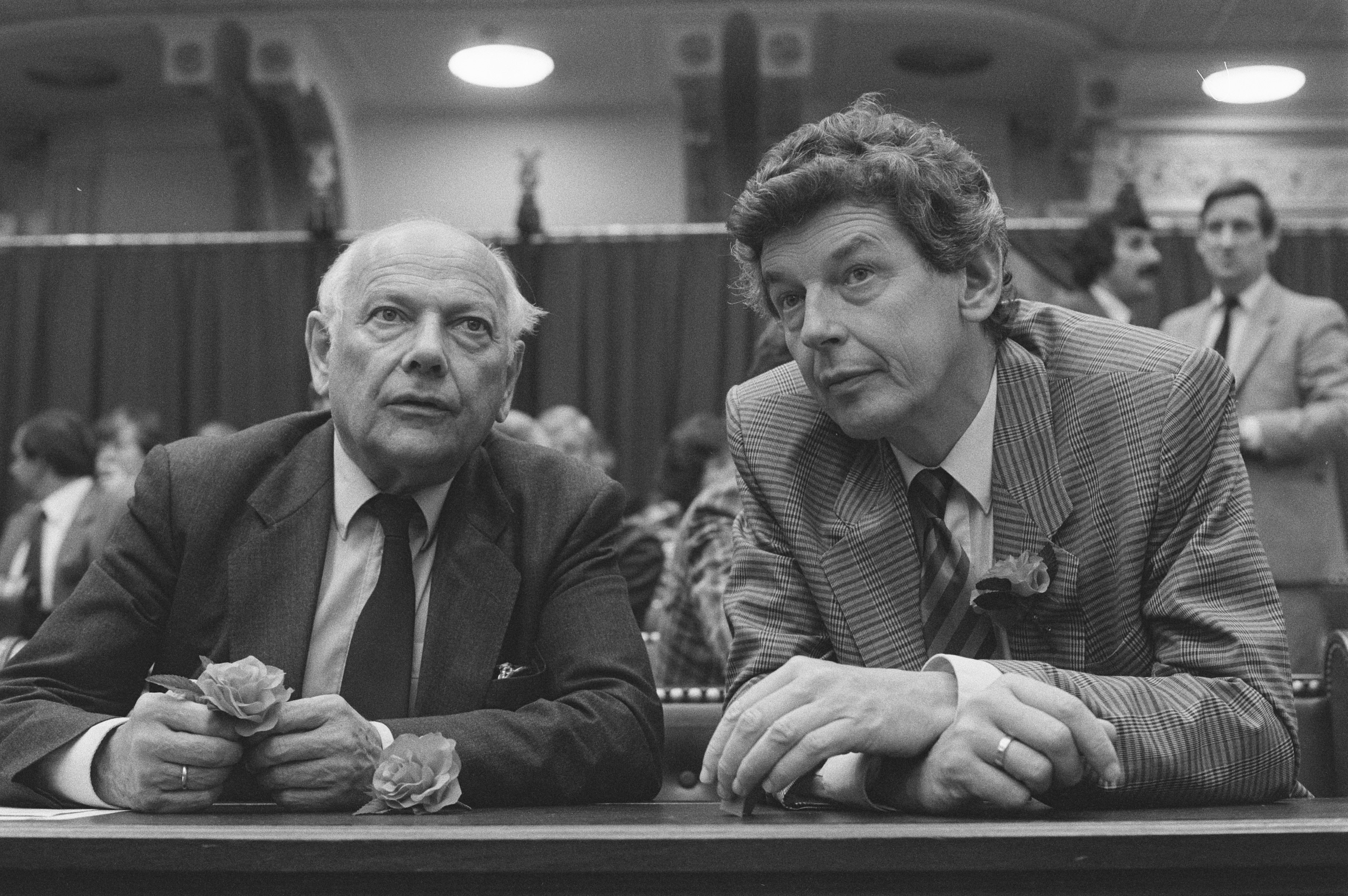
Joop den Uyl and Wim Kok on 3 June 1986.

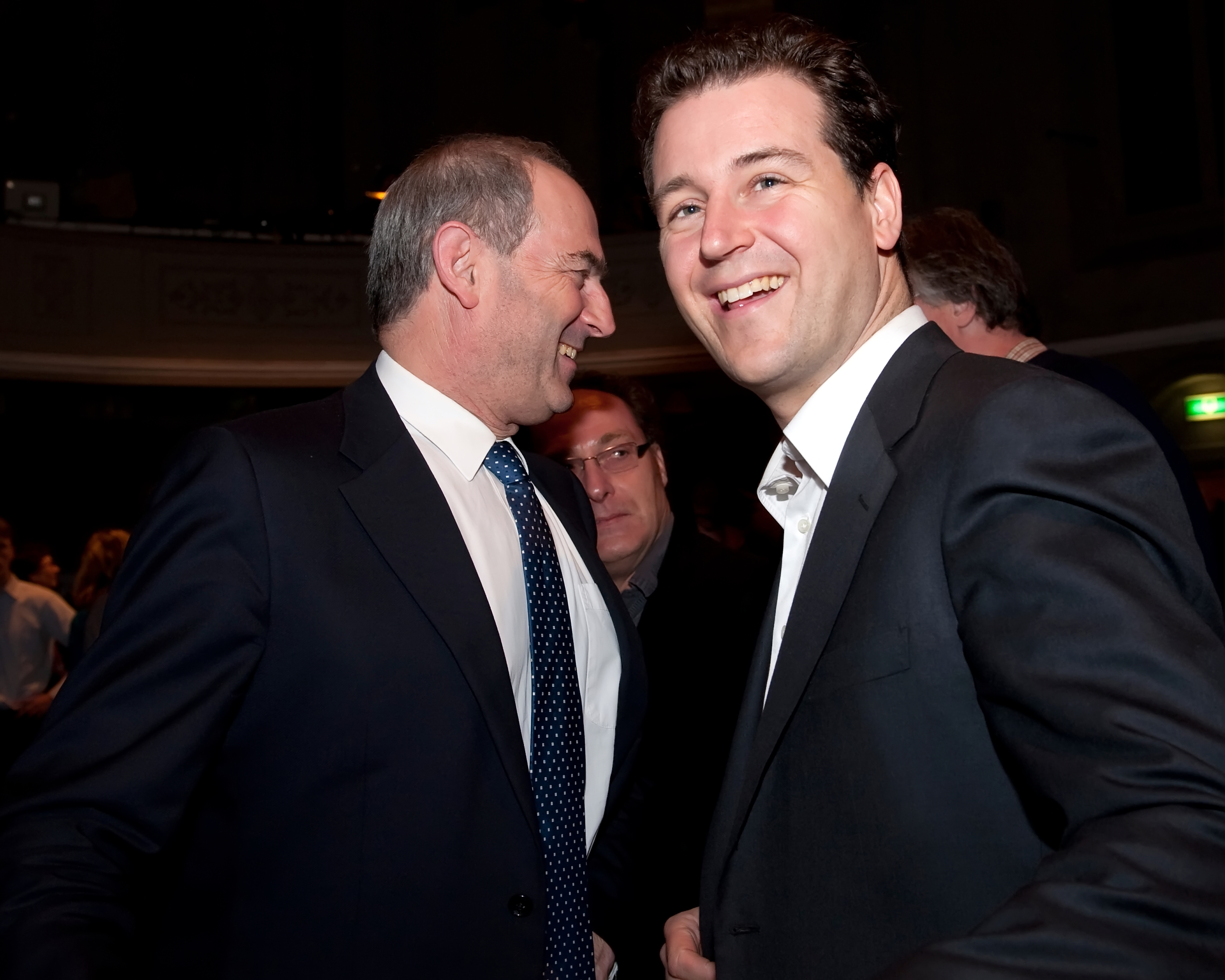
Job Cohen and Lodewijk Asscher on 3 February 2010.

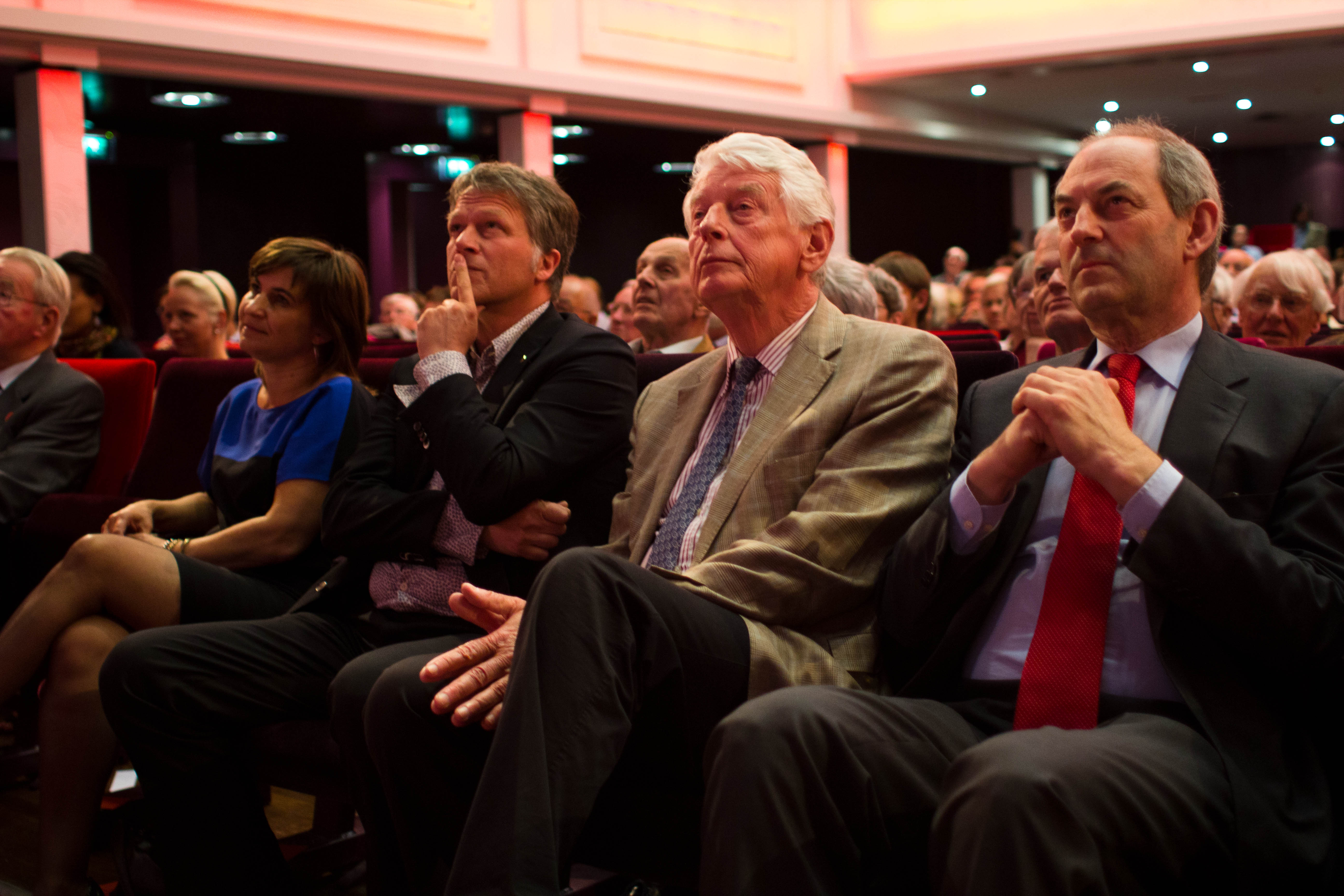
Lilianne Ploumen, Wouter Bos, Wim Kok and Job Cohen on 1 May 2011.

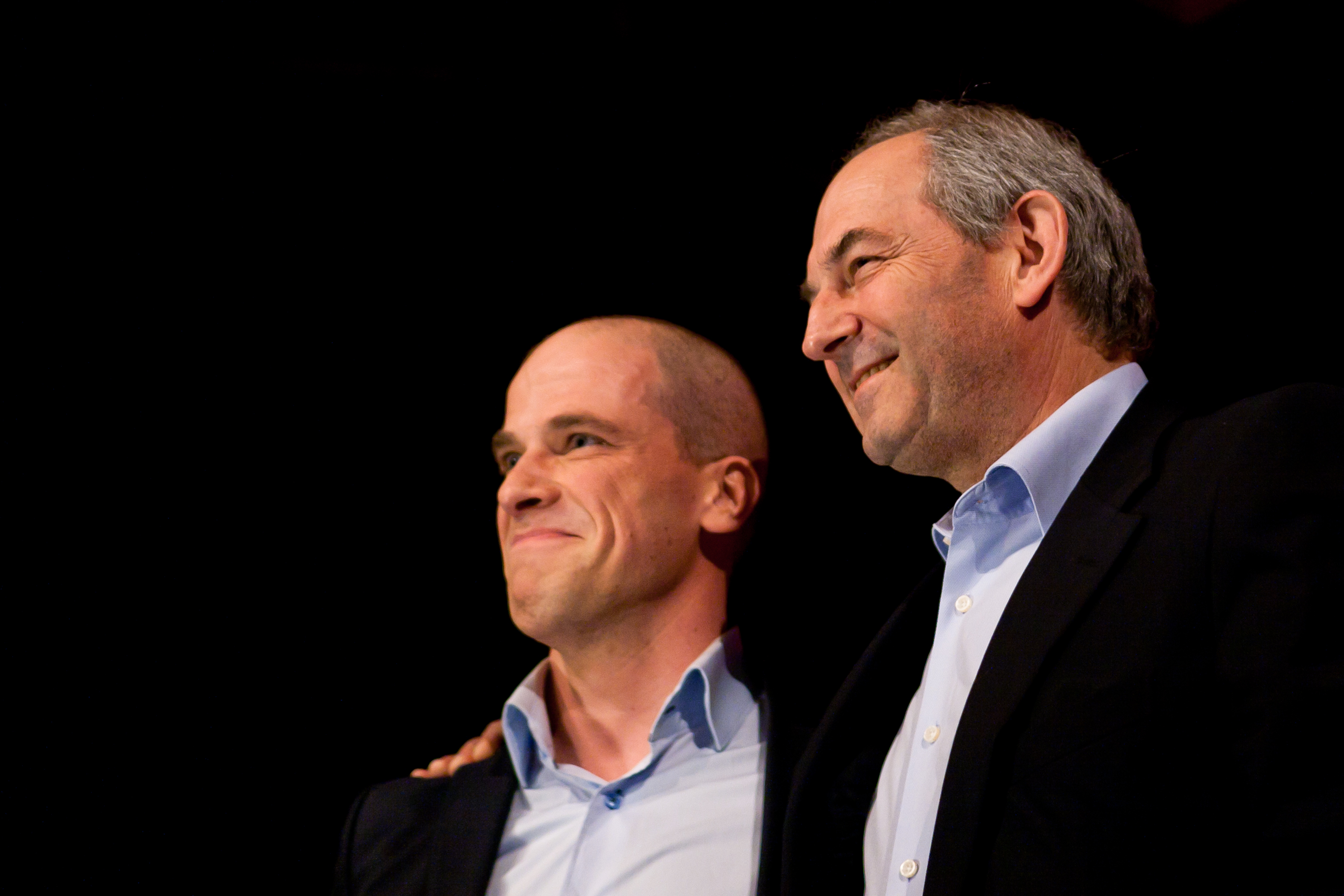
Diederik Samsom and Job Cohen on 21 March 2012.

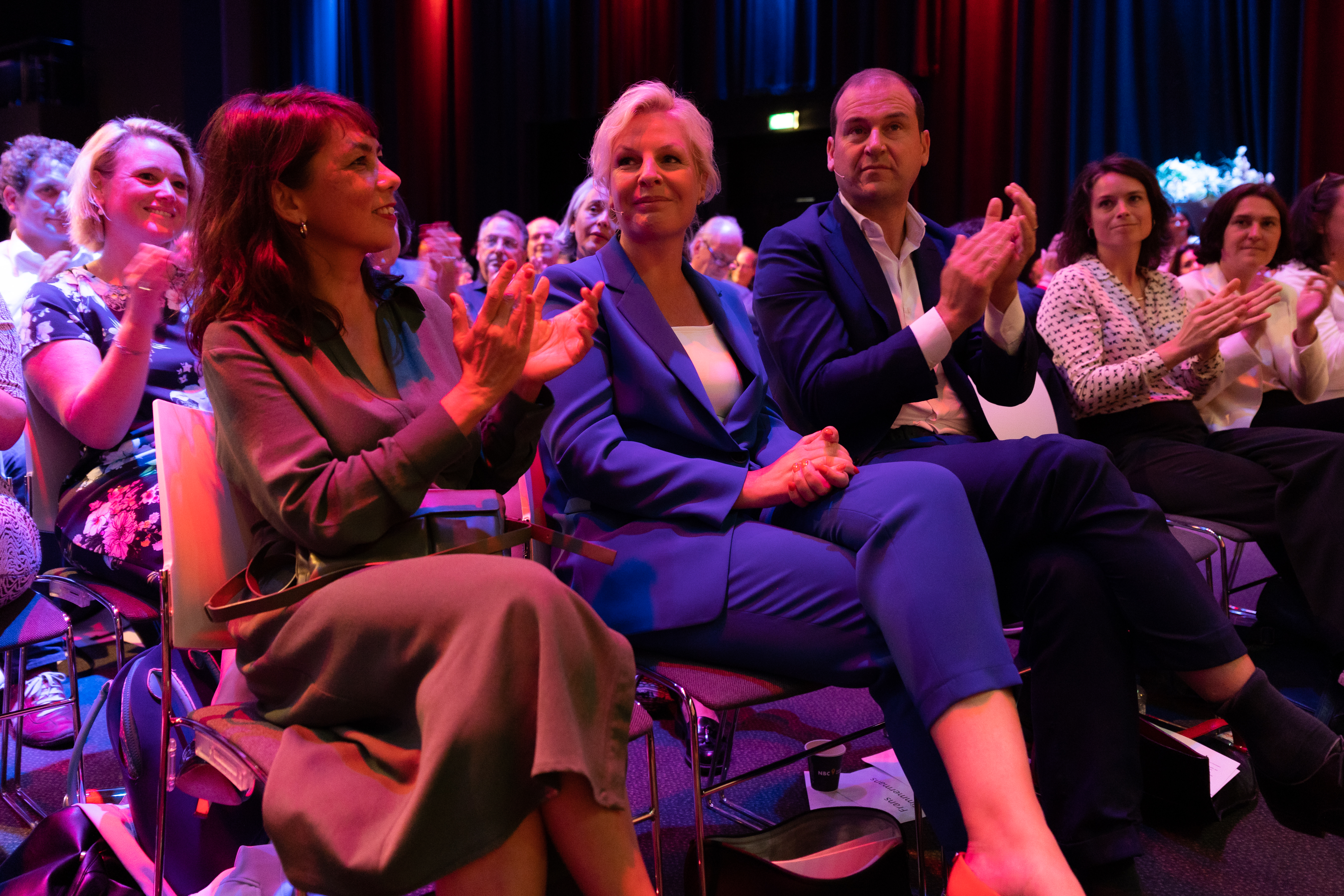
Attje Kuiken and Lodewijk Asscher on 11 June 2022.

Leader		Term of office	Age as leader	Position(s)	Lead candidate
Willem Drees	Willem Drees (1886–1988)	9 February 1946 – 22 December 1958 (12 years, 316 days)^{[Retired]}	59–72	Member of the Municipal council of The Hague (1913–1941); Member of the Provincial council of South Holland (1919–1941); Alderman of The Hague (1919–1933); Member of the House of Representatives (1933–1945, 1946, 1948, 1952, 1956); Parliamentary leader in the House of Representatives (1939–1945); Minister of Social Affairs (1945–1948); Deputy Prime Minister (1945–1948); Prime Minister (1948–1958); Minister of Colonial Affairs (1951); Minister of Finance (1952); Minister of State (1958–1988) (Title of honor)	1946; 1948; 1952; 1956
Jaap Burger	Jaap Burger (1904–1986)	22 December 1958 – 16 September 1962 (3 years, 268 days)^{[Resigned]}	54–58	Minister without Portfolio (1943–1944); Minister of the Interior (1944–1945); Member of the House of Representatives (1945–1962); Parliamentary leader in the House of Representatives (1951, 1952–1962); Member of the Senate (1963–1970); Member of the European Parliament (1966–1970); Member of the Council of State (1970–1979); Minister of State (1975–1986) (Title of honor)	1959
Vacant (16 September 1962 – 25 September 1962)
Anne Vondeling	Anne Vondeling (1916–1979)	25 September 1962 – 24 September 1966 (3 years, 364 days)^{[Resigned]}	46–50	Member of the House of Representatives (1946–1958, 1959–1965, 1967–1979); Minister of Agriculture, Fisheries and Food Supplies (1958); Member of the Provincial council of Friesland (1962); Parliamentary leader in the House of Representatives (1962–1965); Minister of Finance (1965–1966); Deputy Prime Minister (1965–1966); Speaker of the House of Representatives (1972–1979); Member of the European Parliament (1979); Delegation leader in the European Parliament (1979)	1963
Joop den Uyl	Joop den Uyl (1919–1987)	24 September 1966 – 21 July 1986 (19 years, 300 days)^{[Retired]}	47–66	Member of the Municipal council of Amsterdam (1953–1965); Member of the House of Representatives (1956–1963, 1967–1973, 1977, 1978–1981, 1982–1987); Alderman of Amsterdam (1962–1965); Minister of Economic Affairs (1965–1966); Parliamentary leader in the House of Representatives (1967–1973, 1977, 1978–1981, 1982–1986); Prime Minister (1973–1977); President of the European Council (1976); President of the Party of European Socialists (1980–1987); Minister of Social Affairs and Employment (1981–1982); Minister for Netherlands Antilles Affairs (1981–1982); Deputy Prime Minister (1981–1982)	1967; 1971; 1972; 1977; 1981; 1982; 1986
Wim Kok	Wim Kok (1938–2018)	21 July 1986 – 15 December 2001 (15 years, 147 days)^{[Retired]}	47–63	Member of the Social and Economic Council (1973–1985); Member of the House of Representatives (1986–1989, 1994, 1998); Parliamentary leader in the House of Representatives (1986–1989, 1994, 1998); Minister of Finance (1989–1994); Deputy Prime Minister (1989–1994); Prime Minister (1994–2002); President of the European Council (1997); Minister of State (2003–2018) (Title of honor)	1989; 1994; 1998
Ad Melkert	Ad Melkert (born 1956)	15 December 2001 – 16 May 2002 (155 days)^{[Resigned]}	45–46	Member of the House of Representatives (1986–1994, 1998–2002); Minister of Social Affairs and Employment (1994–1998); Parliamentary leader in the House of Representatives (1998–2002); Associate Administrator of the United Nations Development Programme (2006–2009); Special Representative of the United Nations Assistance Mission for Iraq (2009–2011); Member of the Council of State (2016–2022)	2002
Vacant (16 May 2002 – 17 November 2002)
Wouter Bos	Wouter Bos (born 1963)	12 November 2002 – 25 April 2010 (7 years, 164 days)^{[Retired]}	39–46	Member of the House of Representatives (1998–2000, 2002–2007); State Secretary for Finance (2000–2002); Parliamentary leader in the House of Representatives (2002–2007); Minister of Finance (2007–2010); Deputy Prime Minister (2007–2010)	2003; 2006
Job Cohen	Job Cohen (born 1947)	25 April 2010 – 20 February 2012 (1 year, 301 days)^{[Resigned]}	62–64	State Secretary for Education and Sciences (1993–1994); Member of the Senate (1995–1998); Parliamentary leader in the Senate (1996–1998); State Secretary for Justice (1998–2001); Mayor of Amsterdam (2001–2010); Member of the House of Representatives (2010–2012); Parliamentary leader in the House of Representatives (2010–2012)	2010
Vacant (20 February 2012 – 17 March 2012)
Diederik Samsom	Diederik; Samsom (born 1971)	17 March 2012 – 9 December 2016 (4 years, 267 days)^{[Defeated]}	40–45	Member of the House of Representatives (2003–2016); Parliamentary leader in the House of Representatives (2010–2016)	2012
Lodewijk Asscher	Lodewijk; Asscher (born 1974)	9 December 2016 – 14 January 2021 (4 years, 36 days)^{[Resigned]}	42–46	Member of the Municipal council of Amsterdam (2002–2006, 2010); Alderman of Amsterdam (2006–2010, 2010–2012); Mayor of Amsterdam (2010); Minister of Social Affairs and Employment (2012–2017); Deputy Prime Minister (2012–2017); Member of the House of Representatives (2017–2021); Parliamentary leader in the House of Representatives (2017–2021)	2017
Vacant (14 January 2021 – 18 January 2021)
Lilianne Ploumen	Lilianne; Ploumen (born 1963)	18 January 2021 – 12 April 2022 (1 year, 84 days)^{[Resigned]}	58–59	Minister for Foreign Trade and Development Cooperation (2012–2017); Member of the House of Representatives (2017–2022); Parliamentary leader in the House of Representatives (2021–2022)	2021
Vacant (12 April 2022 – 11 June 2022)
Attje Kuiken	Attje Kuiken (born 1977)	11 June 2022 – 22 August 2023 (1 year, 72 days)^{[Retired]}	44–45	Member of the House of Representatives (2006–2010, 2010–2023); Parliamentary leader in the House of Representatives (2016–2017, 2022–2023)	
Frans Timmermans	Frans; Timmermans (born 1961)	22 August 2023 – 29 October 2025 (2 years, 68 days)^{[Resigned]}	62–64	Member of the House of Representatives (1998–2007, 2010–2012, 2023–2025); State Secretary for Foreign Affairs (2007–2010); Minister of Foreign Affairs (2012–2014); European commissioner (2014–2023); First Vice-President of the European Commission (2014–2019); First Executive Vice-President of the European Commission (2019–2023); Parliamentary leader in the House of Representatives (2023–2025)	2023; 2025

^{Retired from the party leadership}
^{Resigned following internal conflicts over leadership style}
^{Resigned after failing to achieve party consensus about continued leadership}
^{Resigned following disappointing election results after the 2002 general election}
^{Resigned following internal discussions over continued leadership capabilities}
^{Resigned following disappointing election results after the 2025 general election}
^{Defeated for reelection}

== See also ==
- Leadership elections
  - 2002
  - 2012
  - 2016
