= Lodewijk Asscher =

Dutch politician

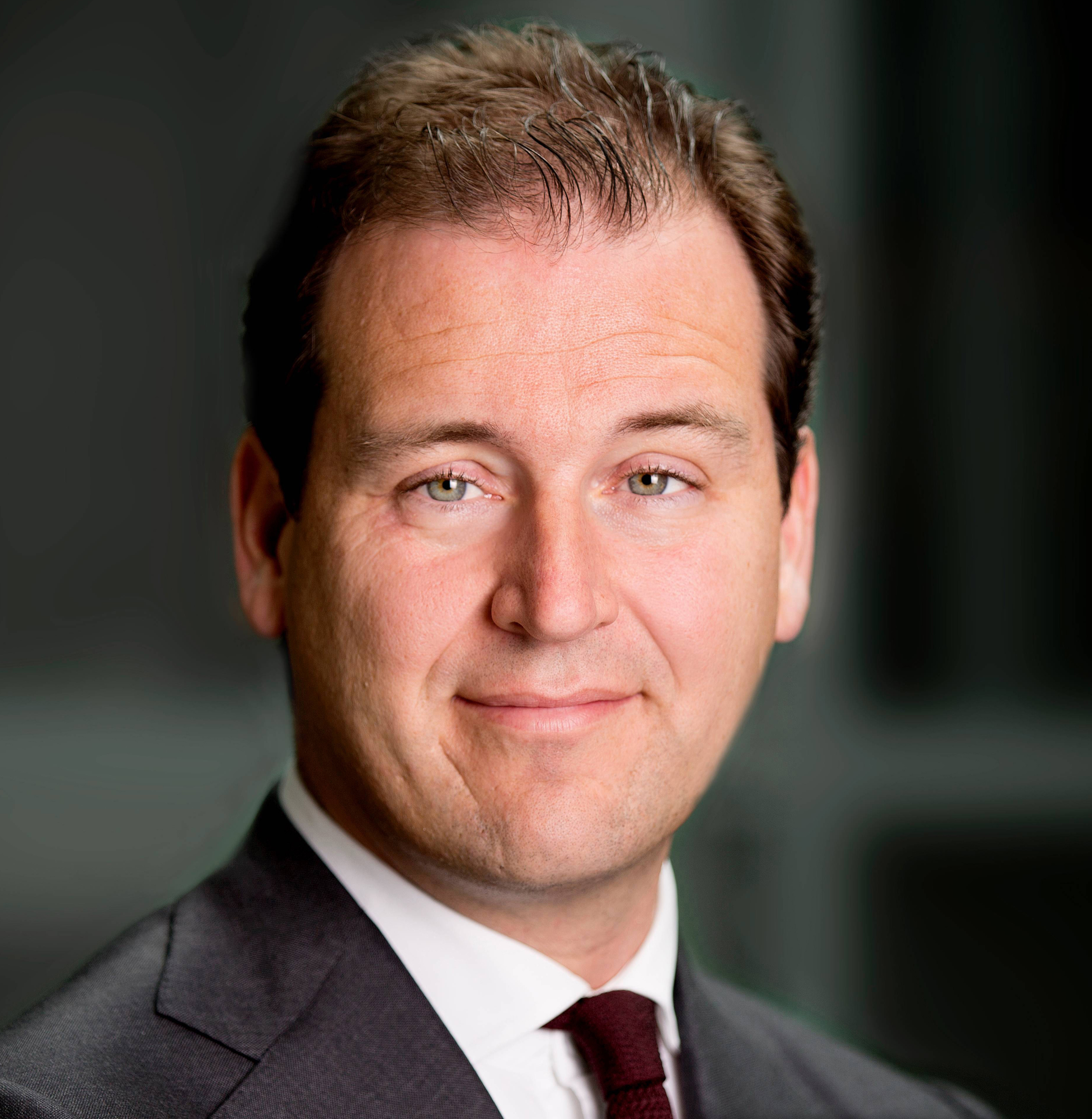
- Asscher in 2015

Leader of the Labour Party in the House of Representatives
- In office 23 March 2017 – 14 January 2021
- Preceded by: Attje Kuiken
- Succeeded by: Lilianne Ploumen

Leader of the Labour Party
- In office 10 December 2016 – 14 January 2021
- Deputy: Sharon Dijksma; Lilianne Ploumen
- Preceded by: Diederik Samsom
- Succeeded by: Lilianne Ploumen

Deputy Prime Minister of the Netherlands
- In office 5 November 2012 – 26 October 2017
- Prime Minister: Mark Rutte
- Preceded by: Maxime Verhagen
- Succeeded by: Hugo de Jonge (First Deputy)

Minister of Social Affairs and Employment
- In office 5 November 2012 – 26 October 2017
- Prime Minister: Mark Rutte
- Preceded by: Henk Kamp
- Succeeded by: Wouter Koolmees

Member of the House of Representatives
- In office 23 March 2017 – 30 March 2021

Mayor of Amsterdam
- Acting
- In office 12 March 2010 – 7 July 2010
- Preceded by: Job Cohen
- Succeeded by: Eberhard van der Laan

Personal details
- Born: Lodewijk Frans Asscher; 27 September 1974 (age 51) Amsterdam, Netherlands
- Party: Labour Party
- Spouse: Jildau Piena (m. 2007)
- Children: 3 sons
- Relatives: Abraham Asscher (great-grandfather); Hans Vonk (uncle)
- Education: University of Amsterdam (BSocSc, LLB, LLM, DPhil)

Lodewijk Frans Asscher (Dutch pronunciation: [ˈloːdəʋɛik frɑns ˈɑɕər]; born 27 September 1974) is a Dutch politician and jurist who served as Leader of the Labour Party (PvdA) from 2016 to 2021 and parliamentary leader in the House of Representatives from 2017 to 2021.

Asscher worked as a researcher at the University of Amsterdam from 1996 until 2002. He was elected as a municipal councillor of Amsterdam on 8 March 2002 and assumed the leadership of the Labour Party in the municipal council on 3 April 2004. He worked as an associate professor of Intellectual property law at the University of Amsterdam from 1 May 2002 until 1 May 2006. Asscher was the lijsttrekker (top candidate) for the PvdA in the 2006 municipal election and became Deputy Mayor and alderman on 26 April 2006. Following the resignation of Mayor of Amsterdam Job Cohen to run for the Labour Party leadership for the election of 2010, Asscher as Deputy Mayor served as ad interim Mayor of Amsterdam from 12 March 2010 until 7 July 2010. After the election of 2012 Asscher was appointed as Deputy Prime Minister and Minister of Social Affairs and Employment in the Cabinet Rutte II, serving from 5 November 2012 until 26 October 2017.

== Early life and education ==
Lodewijk Frans Asscher was born on 27 September 1974 in Amsterdam in a mixed religious family; his father is of Jewish descent and his mother is Catholic. His father, jurist Bram Asscher, was a member of the centre-right People's Party for Freedom and Democracy and his mother a member of the Labour Party.

Asscher went to the Christelijk Gymnasium Sorghvliet in The Hague. He studied psychology (propaedeutics in 1995) and Dutch law (master's degree in 1998) at the University of Amsterdam in Amsterdam. In 2002, he received his PhD in law from the University of Amsterdam.

== Politics ==
=== Amsterdam ===
Asscher entered the municipal council after the Dutch municipal elections of 2002. Besides his role as the group leader of the Labour Party in the Amsterdam municipal council, he took part in the commission on General Affairs.

Until 1 January 2006, Asscher taught information law at the University of Amsterdam. In his book "New Amsterdam", Asscher advocated the eventual disappearance of the red light district. A few days after the release of the book, Asscher revoked that statement, stating that he was not against prostitution, but rather against sexual slavery.

After the Dutch municipal elections of 2006, where he led the Labour Party's campaign in Amsterdam, Asscher was installed as an alderman on 26 April. His portfolio included Economics, Airport and Harbour; he also was Deputy Mayor of Amsterdam from 2006 until 2010. He served as Acting Mayor of Amsterdam from 12 March 2010 to 7 July 2010 and then became the alderman in charge of Finances until 5 November 2012.

=== National ===
On 5 November 2012, he became Minister of Social Affairs and Employment and Deputy Prime Minister in the Second Rutte cabinet. In Amsterdam he was succeeded by Eberhard van der Laan (also PvdA).

In September 2014, Asscher announced heightened scrutiny of four Dutch-Turkish organisations that he suspected of hindering integration, including a religious group, Millî Görüş. This led to the expulsion of 2 Dutch Turkish MPs from the Labour Party after they harshly criticised the move.

On 9 December 2016, Asscher won the leadership of the Labour Party in an election against incumbent Diederik Samsom. He obtained 54,5% of the vote. In the Dutch general election of 2017, the PvdA suffered the biggest defeat in Dutch electoral history, receiving only 5.7% of the votes and losing 29 of its 38 seats. The PvdA did not rejoin the government after the election. Asscher was succeeded as Minister of Social Affairs and Employment by Wouter Koolmees in the Third Rutte cabinet, on 26 October 2017. While being the presumptive party leader for the 2021 parliamentary elections, Asscher withdrew as leader on 14 January 2021 with just two months before the election, due to his role as Minister of Social Affairs in the toeslagenaffaire (social benefits scandal). He later joined consultancy firm Van de Bunt as a partner.

== Personal ==
Lodewijk Asscher is married to Jildau Piena, with whom he has three sons.

== Bibliography ==
- (1999) Constitutionele convergentie van pers, omroep en telecommunicatie (Constitutional Convergence of Press, Broadcaster, and Telecommunication)
- (2002) Communicatiegrondrechten (Fundamental Rights of Communication)
- (2005) Nieuw Amsterdam (New Amsterdam)
- (2010) De ontsluierde stad (The Unveiled City)

Political offices
Preceded by Job Cohen	Mayor of Amsterdam; Acting; 2010	Succeeded by Eberhard van der Laan
Preceded by Maxime Verhagen	Deputy Prime Minister of the Netherlands; 2012–2017	Succeeded by Hugo de Jonge as First Deputy Prime Minister of the Netherlands
Preceded by Henk Kamp	Minister of Social Affairs and Employment; 2012–2017	Succeeded by Wouter Koolmees
Party political offices
Preceded by Diederik Samsom	Leader of the Labour Party; 2016–2021	Succeeded by Lilianne Ploumen
Preceded by Attje Kuiken	Leader of the Labour Party in the House of Representatives; 2017–2021	Succeeded by Lilianne Ploumen
