= Attje Kuiken =

Dutch politician and civil servant (born 1977)

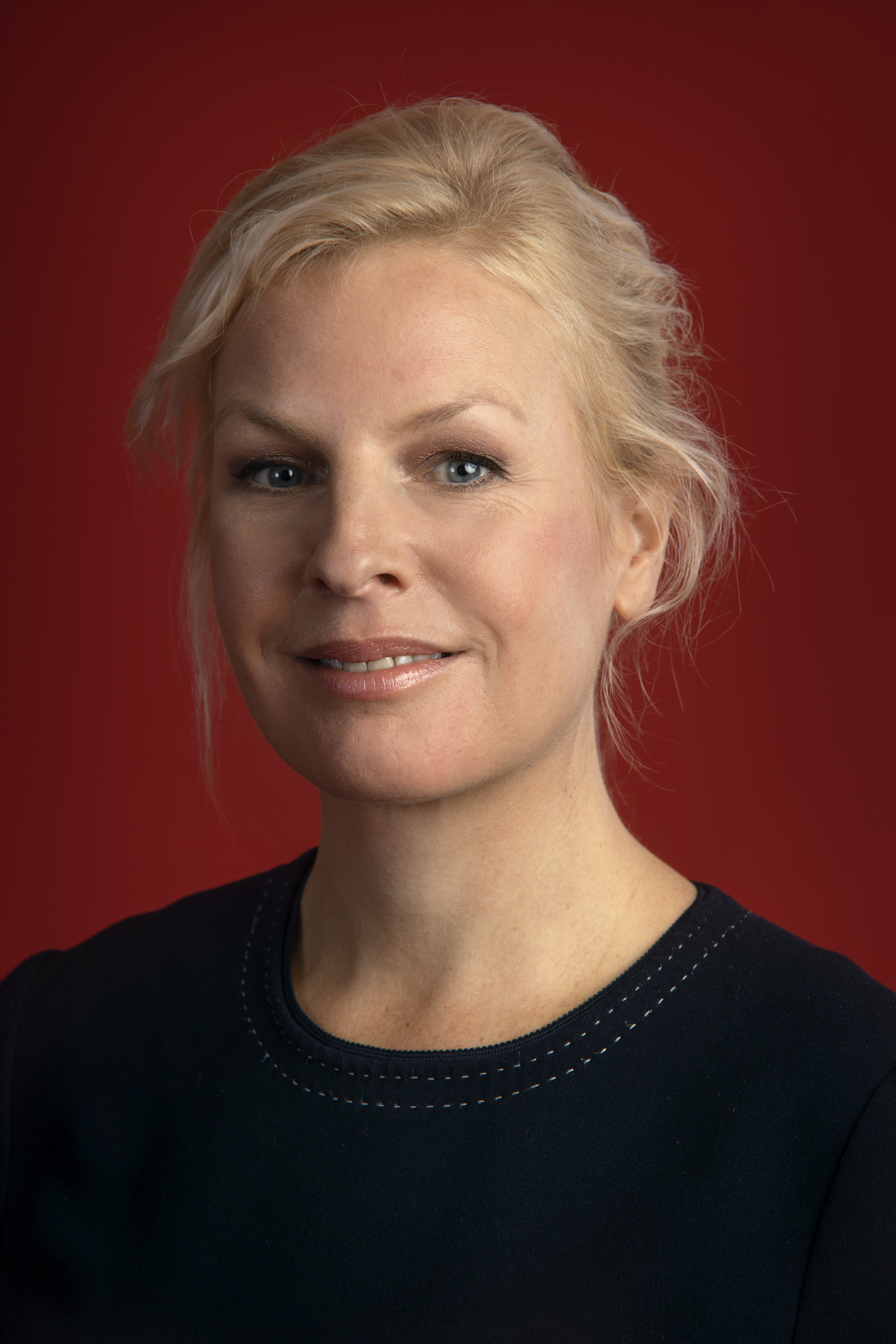
- Kuiken in 2016

Leader of the Labour Party
- In office 11 June 2023 – 22 August 2023
- Preceded by: Lilianne Ploumen
- Succeeded by: Frans Timmermans (as leader of GroenLinks-PvdA)

Leader of the Labour Party in the House of Representatives
- In office 22 April 2022 – 5 December 2023
- Preceded by: Lilianne Ploumen
- Succeeded by: Jesse Klaver (as leader of the combined GroenLinks–PvdA parliamentary group)
- In office 12 December 2016 – 23 March 2017
- Preceded by: Diederik Samsom
- Succeeded by: Lodewijk Asscher

Member of House of Representatives
- In office 11 May 2010 – 5 December 2023
- In office 30 November 2006 – 19 January 2010

Personal details
- Born: Attje Harma Kuiken; 27 October 1977 (age 48) Groningen, Netherlands
- Party: Labour Party
- Children: 1
- Education: Tilburg University

Attje Harma Kuiken (Dutch pronunciation: [ˈɑtɕə ˈɦɑrmaː ˈkœykə(n)]; born 27 October 1977) is a Dutch politician and former civil servant who served as the leader of the Labour Party in the House of Representatives from 22 April 2022 until 5 December 2023. She served two terms as parliamentary leader of the Labour Party, and was leader of the Labour Party between June and August 2023.

== Early life and education ==
Attje Harma Kuiken was born on 27 October 1977 in Groningen. She grew up in Hoogezand-Sappemeer and from the age of ten in Ferwert. She did the vwo program at the Dockinga College, a high school in Dokkum, from 1990 to 1996.

Kuiken studied public administration at the NHL University of Applied Sciences in Leeuwarden from 1996 to 1999 and organization science at the Tilburg University from 2000 to 2006. During her second studies, she lived in Breda.

== Politics ==
Kuiken has been a member of the Labour Party since 2002. She founded a local chapter of the Young Socialists, the youth organisation of the Labour Party, in Breda. She was a member of the House of Representatives from 30 November 2006 until 19 January 2010. She then went on maternity leave and was temporarily replaced by Saskia Laaper. Kuiken has been a member of the House of Representatives again since 11 May 2010.

After fellow Labour member Martijn van Dam was appointed State Secretary for Economic Affairs in November 2015, Kuiken was elected vice parliamentary group leader. After the resignation of Diederik Samsom as parliamentary leader on 12 December 2016, Kuiken succeeded him.

After the resignation of Lilianne Ploumen, she again was elected parliamentary leader on 22 April 2022. On 11 June 2023 she was elected as leader of the Labour Party by the national Labour congress. As leader, she led the party to second place in the 2023 provincial elections, in the party's first joined campaign with GroenLinks. While the combined parties did not manage to beat the surging Farmer–Citizen Movement to first place, the dominant VVD was successfully resigned to a distant third place. The perceived success of the joint campaign laid the groundwork for Labour and GroenLinks run a formal single list in the snap general elections later that year. She did not stand for the elections of 2023, retiring from politics.

== Personal life ==
Kuiken lives in Breda and she has a daughter.

Party political offices
Preceded by Diederik Samsom	Leader of the Labour Party in the House of Representatives; 2016–2017	Succeeded by Lodewijk Asscher
Preceded by Lilianne Ploumen	Leader of the Labour Party in the House of Representatives; 2022–2023	Succeeded by Frans Timmermans
