= Diederik Samsom =

Dutch environmentalist and retired politician

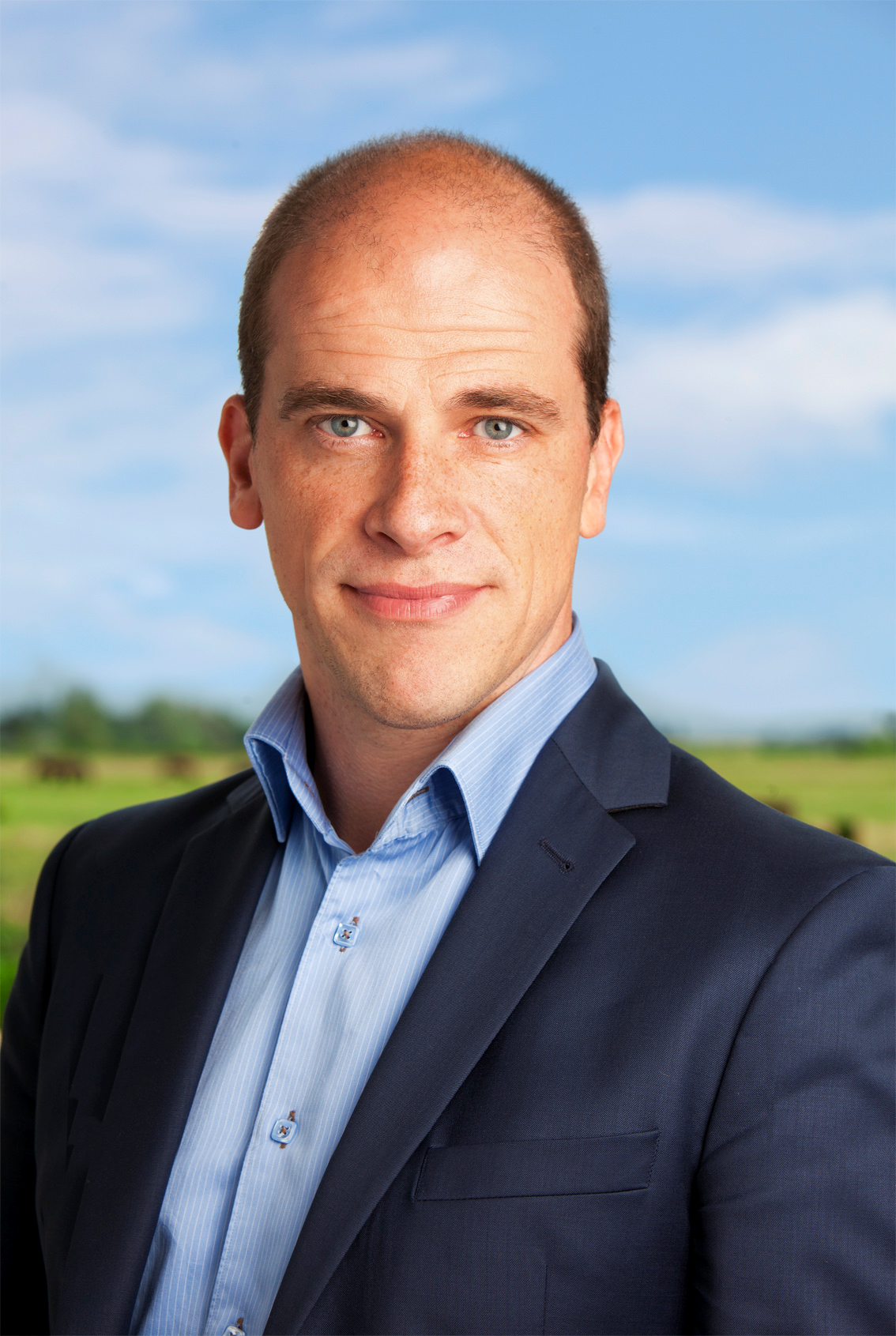
- Samsom in July 2012

Leader of the Labour Party in the House of Representatives
- In office 20 March 2012 – 12 December 2016
- Preceded by: Job Cohen
- Succeeded by: Attje Kuiken

Leader of the Labour Party
- In office 20 March 2012 – 10 December 2016
- Preceded by: Job Cohen
- Succeeded by: Lodewijk Asscher

Member of the House of Representatives
- In office 30 January 2003 – 14 December 2016

Personal details
- Born: Diederik Maarten Samsom; 10 July 1971 (age 54) Groningen, Netherlands
- Party: Labour Party
- Spouse: Tineke (Divorced)
- Children: 2
- Education: Delft University of Technology (ir.)
- Diederik Samsom's voice Recorded September 2014

Diederik Maarten Samsom (Dutch pronunciation: [ˈdidərɪk ˈmaːrtə(n) ˈsɑmsɔm]; born 10 July 1971) is a Dutch environmentalist and retired politician who was the leader of the Labour Party (Partij van de Arbeid, PvdA) from 2012 to 2016. He was the first leader in the 70-year history of the PvdA to have been voted out of his position by party members. He later served as head of cabinet for First Vice-President of the European Commission Frans Timmermans and his successor Wopke Hoekstra.

Elected to the House of Representatives between 30 January 2003 and 14 December 2016, he was elected PvdA parliamentary leader as well as party leader on 16 March 2012. He lost the Labour Party leadership election to Lodewijk Asscher in December 2016. Before his election to the House of Representatives he was CEO of a green energy company and a campaigner for Greenpeace Netherlands.

== Early life and career ==
Diederik Maarten Samsom was born on 10 July 1971 in Groningen in the Netherlands. He was raised in Leeuwarden. His father worked as an internist and his mother as a physiotherapist.

Between 1983 and 1989, he attended the Stedelijk Gymnasium (Municipal Gymnasium) in Leeuwarden. There he became interested in physics, and later he went on to study applied physics at Delft University of Technology. Samsom specialised in nuclear physics and became a level three radiation protection expert. He graduated in May 1997, obtaining a Dutch engineer's degree (Dutch: ingenieur). He was also on the board of the national students' union LSVb and edited a yearly edition of the Poenboek, a students' guide relating to monetary issues.

Samsom had been involved in environmental issues long before entering politics. Samsom joined environmental organisation Greenpeace Netherlands in September 1995 as a volunteer. He led several campaigns and projects until he resigned in December 2001, after the PvdA offered him a career in politics. He also worked as the CEO of Echte Energie (Real Energy), a small green energy trading company, from August 2002 until January 2003.

== Political career ==
Samsom became a member of the social democratic Labour party while a student in Delft. He left the party but rejoined in February 2001. He stood as a candidate in the 2002 Dutch general election, but was not elected due to the PvdA receiving insufficient votes in the election. The party regained most of its seats in the 2003 election and this time Samsom had a higher position (nine) on the list of candidates. He was subsequently sworn in as a member of the House of Representatives on 30 January 2003.

=== Red Engineer ===
Together with fellow PvdA parliamentarians Staf Depla and Jeroen Dijsselbloem he traveled around the country campaigning. They operated under the name The Red Engineers (Dutch: De rode ingenieurs), referring to both their scientific backgrounds and their red overalls. NRC newspaper editor Coen van Zwol called their campaign fresh, clear and sharp (Dutch: fris, helder en scherp).

=== Parliamentarian ===
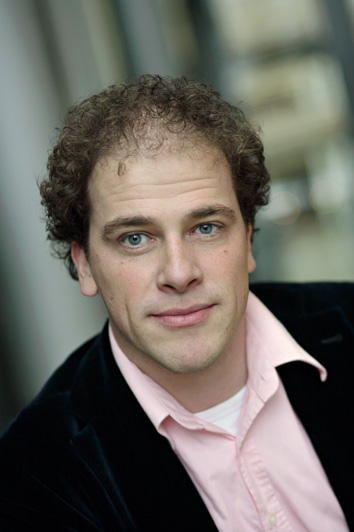
Diederik Samsom in 2006

Before being admitted as the leader of the Labour party, Samsom was the party's spokesperson on environmental issues: sustainability, climate and energy, traffic congestion and railway issues and projects. He was nineteenth on the list of candidates in the 2006 Dutch general elections receiving a relative high number of 6248 preferential votes.

=== 2008 parliamentary chair election ===
In April 2008, Samsom was a candidate to succeed Jacques Tichelaar as parliament party leader, but eventually he lost the vote to Mariëtte Hamer.

Jacques Tichelaar became the leader of the parliamentary party shortly after the 2006 general election in February 2007 but fell ill in January 2008. He underwent a septuple bypass surgery and this took him three months to recuperate. On 16 April, he announced he had decided to resign from office for health reasons. Tichelaar planned to return as a parliamentarian on 1 July 2008. As vice parliamentary leader Hamer had led the party in Tichelaar's absence. The next day she decided to run for office. Three days later, Samsom officially announced that he would also compete in the race. Other names were mentioned, but only Samsom and Hamer decided to vie for the position. All 33 PvdA parliamentarians gathered two days later to discuss the position and cast their votes, resulting in a victory for Hamer.

According to pollster Maurice de Hond, a majority of the 2006 Labour voters preferred Samsom as party leader. Out of a total of 1,500 Labour voters, 26% favoured Hamer while 42% liked Samsom better. In this poll, of the people who indicated that they would vote for the PvdA in the future, a small majority of 40 to 35 preferred Samsom.

=== Party leadership ===
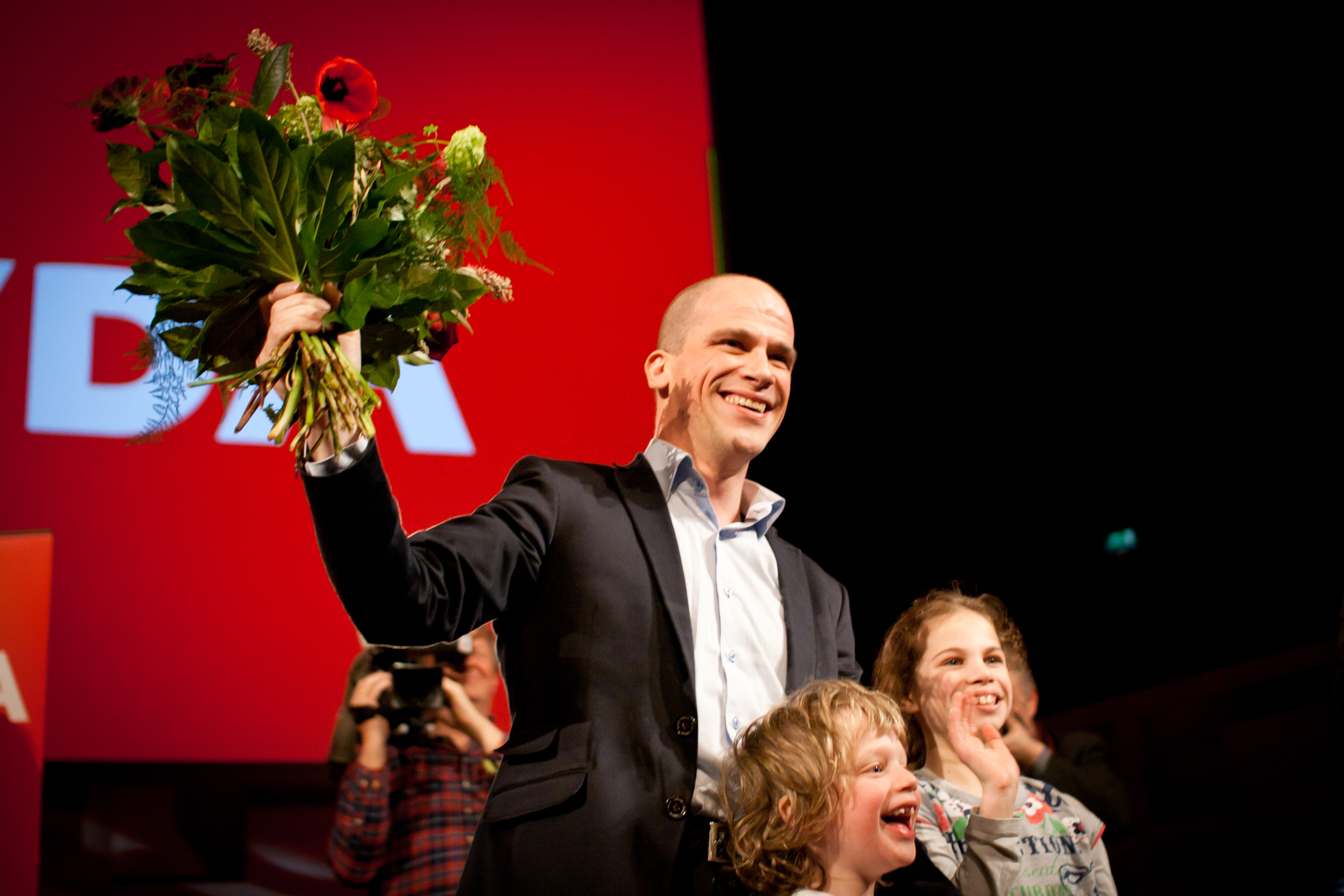
Samsom after his victory in the leadership election

On 22 February 2012, following Job Cohen's resignation as party leader, Samsom stood as candidate in the party's leadership ballot which was held among the party members. On 16 March 2012, he obtained a landslide victory with 54% of the vote, with the runner-up Ronald Plasterk receiving 32% of the vote. Samsom stated he would like to become prime minister should the PvdA become the largest party, or otherwise continue his role of chairman of his party in the House of Representatives (Tweede Kamer).

==== Rutte II: coalition government ====
In the 2012 general election the PvdA, under Samsom's leadership, gained 8 seats and totaled at 38 seats in the Tweede Kamer. After a swift negotiations the PvdA, as second largest party, entered into a coalition with the largest party the VVD. Samsom remained chairman of the PvdA in the Tweede Kamer and Lodewijk Asscher became vicepremier and minister for Social Affairs and Employment on behalf of the PvdA.

==== EU-Turkey refugee deal ====
During the Dutch Presidency of the Council of the European Union in early 2016, Diederik Samsom is credited with masterminding a key provision in the deal between the EU and Turkey. The deal aimed to mitigate the mounting humanitarian crisis in the refugee camps on the Greek islands. Under the provision, for every Syrian refugee being returned to Turkey from the Greek islands, another Syrian would be resettled from Turkey to the EU.

==== 2017 elections: resignation ====
Polls suggest that the Labour party lost most of its electoral base while Samsom was in charge. On 9 December 2016 Samsom lost the leadership of the Labour Party in an election against Lodewijk Asscher. He obtained 45,5% of the vote. Samsom resigned from the House of Representatives on 14 December, and was replaced by Rien van der Velde. Attje Kuiken took over the role of group leader of the Labour Party in the House of Representatives on 12 December.

=== European Commission and years after ===
In November 2019, Samsom became head of cabinet for Frans Timmermans, First Vice-President of the European Commission and Commissioner for Climate Action. Wopke Hoekstra succeeded Timmermans in the latter role in late 2023, while Samsom stayed on. Samsom stepped down in February 2024 as head of cabinet and was succeeded by Esther de Lange. He became chair of the supervisory board of state-owned natural gas infrastructure and transportation company Gasunie in July 2024, saying that he wanted to help execute the renewable energy transition. He failed to inform the European Commission of his new position as is required to prevent conflicts of interest, but the body finally allowed the appointment of Samsom under certain conditions.

== Media appearances ==
NRC newspaper referred to Samsom as quizking after he won his fifth televised game show. Particularly notable are his consecutive victories in the 2005 and 2006 National IQ Tests. According to the test, he has an IQ of 136. He also won the popular National News Quiz in 2005 and 2006 and in May 2008 he was crowned winner of the Big History Quiz.

== Personal life ==
Samsom was raised in a non-religious family and considers himself an atheist. He is a non smoker and observes a vegetarian diet. Samsom divorced in 2016 and has two children. Samsom mentioned them in several political debates and interviews in a for the Netherlands unprecedented and criticized way, including drawing attention to his daughter's disability. He also involved his private life and family in his 2012 electoral campaign, most notably by featuring his two children in an official party TV advertisement.

Samsom lived on a houseboat in Broek in Waterland with his ex-wife (then girlfriend) and daughter before moving to Leiden, where he still resides as of 2012. In a 2012 interview with Marie Claire, Samsom admitted that before his marriage he had been unfaithful "perhaps once or twice".

Party political offices
Preceded by Job Cohen	Leader of the Labour Party; 2012–2016	Succeeded by Lodewijk Asscher
Preceded by Job Cohen	Leader of the Labour Party in the House of Representatives; 2012–2016	Succeeded by Attje Kuiken
