= Job Cohen =

Dutch politician (born 1947)

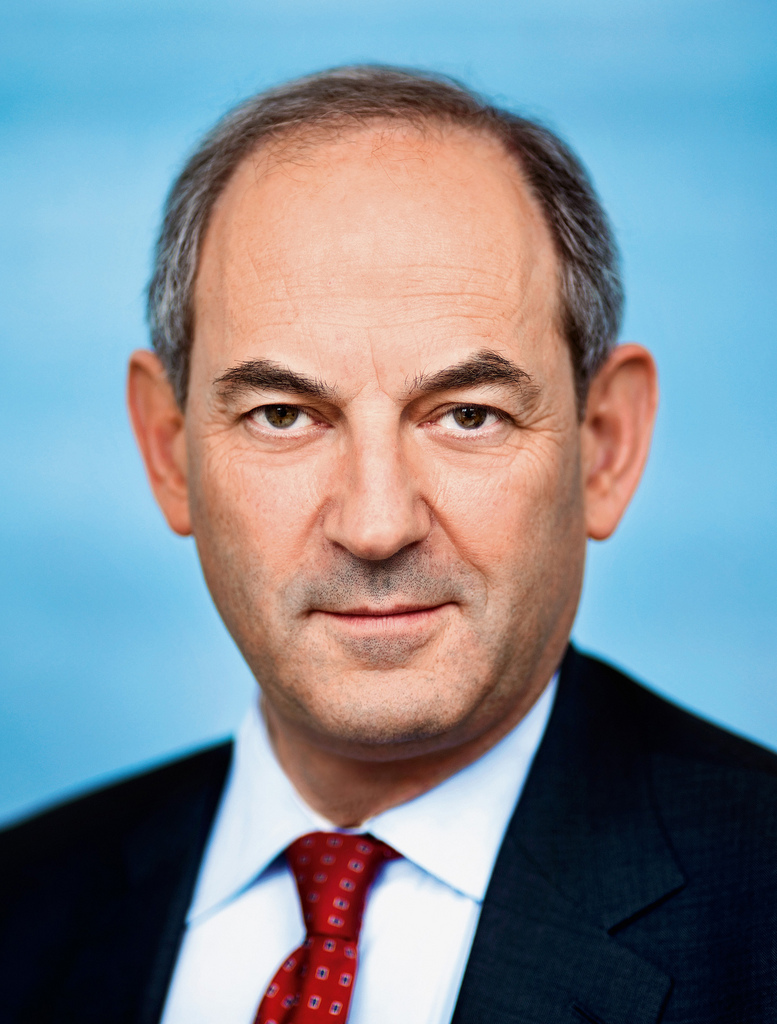
- Cohen in 2010

Member of the House of Representatives
- In office 17 June 2010 – 29 February 2012

Leader of the Labour Party in the House of Representatives
- In office 17 June 2010 – 20 February 2012
- Preceded by: Mariëtte Hamer
- Succeeded by: Jeroen Dijsselbloem

Leader of the Labour Party
- In office 25 April 2010 – 20 February 2012
- Deputy: See list: Jeroen Dijsselbloem Mariëtte Hamer Sharon Dijksma
- Preceded by: Wouter Bos
- Succeeded by: Diederik Samsom

Mayor of Amsterdam
- In office 15 January 2001 – 12 March 2010
- Preceded by: Guusje ter Horst (ad interim)
- Succeeded by: Lodewijk Asscher (ad interim)

State Secretary for Justice
- In office 3 August 1998 – 1 January 2001
- Prime Minister: Wim Kok
- Preceded by: Elizabeth Schmitz
- Succeeded by: Ella Kalsbeek

Leader of the Labour Party in the Senate
- In office 1 August 1996 – 3 August 1998
- Preceded by: Joop van den Berg
- Succeeded by: Johan Stekelenburg

Senator of the Netherlands
- In office 13 June 1995 – 3 August 1998

State Secretary for Education and Sciences
- In office 2 July 1993 – 22 August 1994
- Prime Minister: Ruud Lubbers
- Preceded by: Roel in 't Veld
- Succeeded by: Tineke Netelenbos; Aad Nuis (Education, Culture and Science)

Personal details
- Born: Marius Job Cohen; 18 October 1947 (age 78) Haarlem, Netherlands
- Party: Labour Party (since 1967)
- Spouses: Lidie Lodeweges (m. 1972; died 2015) Anjes van der Linden (m. 2016)
- Children: Jaap Cohen (born 1980); Lotje Cohen (born 1983)
- Parent: Dolf Cohen (1913–2004) (father)
- Relatives: Hendrik Cohen (grand-father); Floris Cohen (brother)
- Education: University of Groningen (LL.B., LL.M.); Leiden University (PhD)
- Occupation: Politician; jurist; researcher; nonprofit director; author; professor

Marius Job Cohen (Note: The phrase Marius Job Cohen is pronounced [ˈmaːrijə ˈɕɔp koːˈɦɛn]. Marius and Job in isolation are pronounced [ˈmaːrijəs] and [jɔp].) (born 18 October 1947) is a retired Dutch politician and jurist who served as Mayor of Amsterdam from 2001 to 2010 and Leader of the Labour Party (PvdA) from 2010 to 2012.

Cohen studied Law at the University of Groningen obtaining a Master of Laws degree. Cohen worked as researcher at the Leiden University before finishing his thesis and graduated as a Doctor of Law in Jurisprudence. Cohen worked as a professor of jurisprudence at the State University of Limburg from September 1983 until June 1993, he also served as rector magnificus of the State University of Limburg from January 1991. Cohen was appointed as State Secretary for Education and Sciences in the Cabinet Lubbers III following a cabinet reshuffle taking office on 9 June 1993. In February 1994 Cohen announced that he would not stand for the election of 1994. Cohen continued to be active in politics and after the Senate election of 1995 was elected as a Member of the Senate on 13 June 1995 and served as a frontbencher and spokesperson for Justice, Education and Science. Cohen also returned to State University of Limburg and again worked as professor of Jurisprudence and served as rector magnificus from January 1995 until August 1998. Following the resignation of Parliamentary leader Joop van den Berg Cohen was selected as his successor on 1 August 1996.

After the election of 1998 Cohen was appointed as State Secretary for Justice in the Cabinet Kok II taking office on 3 August 1998. In December 2000 Cohen was nominated as the next Mayor of Amsterdam serving from 15 January 2001 until his resignation on 12 March 2010. Shortly before an upcoming election Labour Leader Wouter Bos unexpectedly announced his retirement and Cohen announced his candidacy and was anonymously selected as his successor on 25 April 2010. For the election of 2010 Cohen served as Lijsttrekker (top candidate) and was elected as a Member of the House of Representatives and became Parliamentary leader on 17 June 2010. In January 2012 Cohen announced his retirement and that he was stepping down as Leader and Parliamentary leader on 20 February 2012 but continued to serve in the House of Representatives as a backbencher until his resignation on 29 February 2012.

Cohen retired from active politics at 64 and became active in the public sector as a non-profit director and served on several state commissions and councils on behalf of the government, and worked as a distinguished professor of Constitutional law and Governmental studies at his alma mater in Leiden from April 2014 until January 2019.

== Biography ==
=== Family and education ===
Marius Job Cohen was born in Haarlem. He is the second child (of two) of Adolf Emile "Dolf" Cohen (1913–2004) and Henriëtte "Hetty" Koster (1913–1996). His elder brother is Floris Cohen (born 1946).

His parents both studied history and became high school teachers of history. They were secular Jews, and were forced into hiding until the end of World War II. His paternal grandparents Hendrik Cohen and Flora Polak both were murdered in Bergen-Belsen concentration camp in 1945. After the war, his father worked at the Dutch Institute for War Documentation. Later he became a professor of medieval history and a rector magnificus at Leiden University. His mother became a member of the city council of Heemstede. His parents were both early members of the Labour Party.

Cohen attended public primary school in Heemstede. He attended the secondary school Stedelijk Gymnasium in Haarlem from 1960 to 1966. He studied Dutch public law at the University of Groningen from 1966 and obtained his Master of Laws degree in 1971. During his student years, he was a member of the student association Vindicat atque Polit.

Cohen married Lidie Lodeweges on 2 July 1972 in Groningen. She studied Dutch language in Groningen and was a high school teacher. She had multiple sclerosis and needed a wheelchair. Cohen and his wife had two children, son Jaap (born 1980) and daughter Lotje (born 1983). Lidie Cohen died on 4 August 2015.

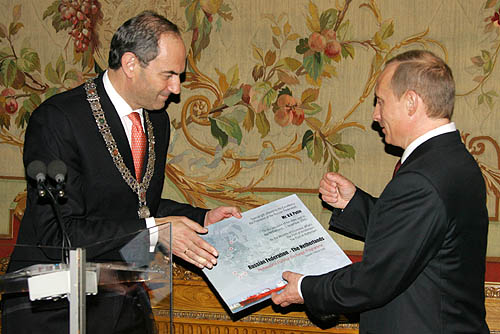
Job Cohen and President of Russia Vladimir Putin during a presentation in Amsterdam on 1 November 2005

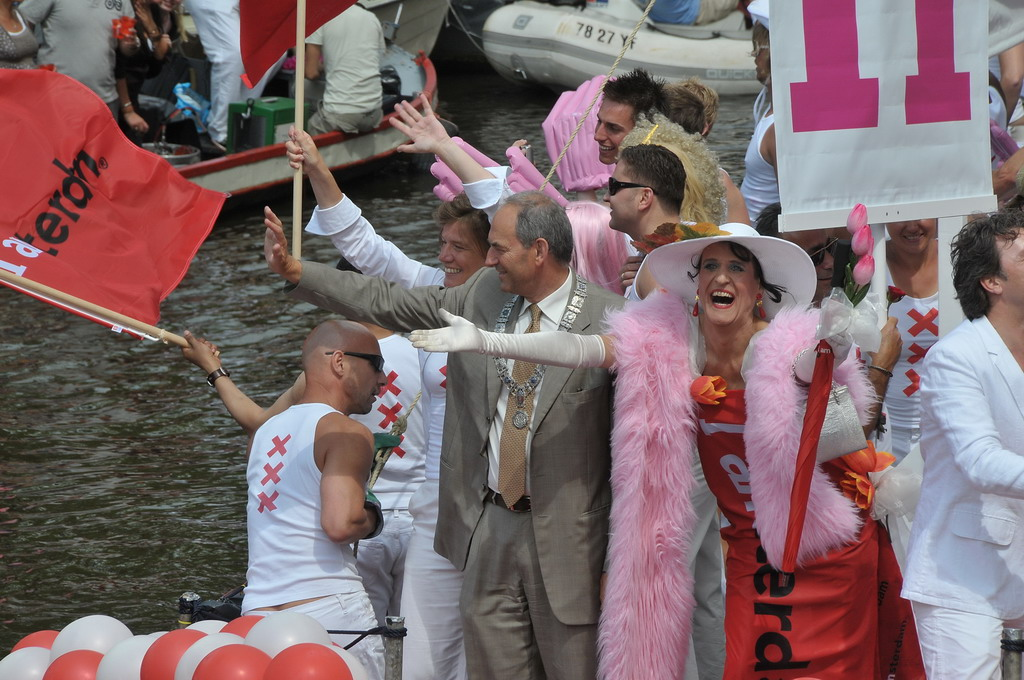
Job Cohen during the Amsterdam Gay Pride on 2 August 2008

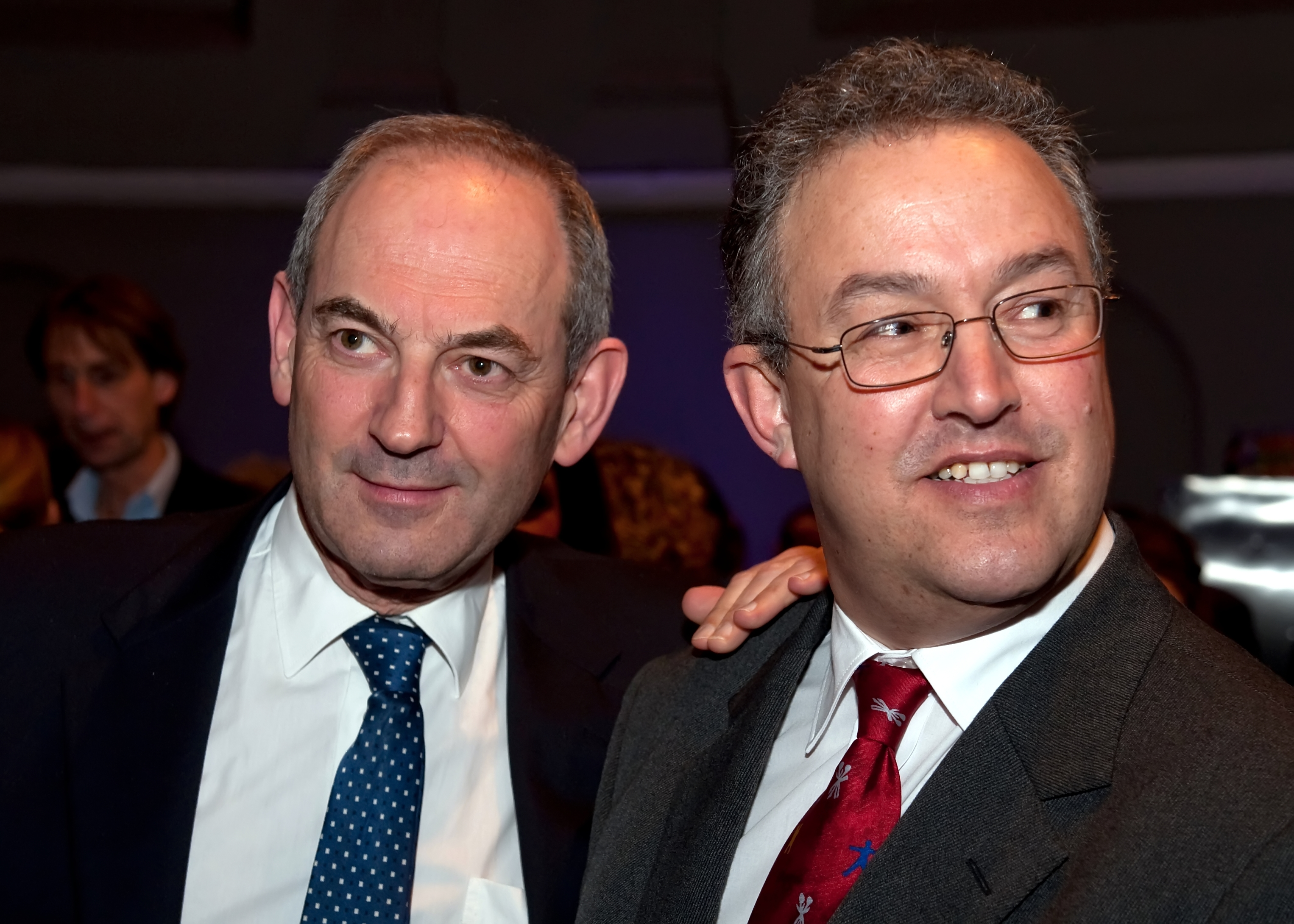
Job Cohen and Mayor of Rotterdam Ahmed Aboutaleb during a meeting in Amsterdam on 3 February 2010

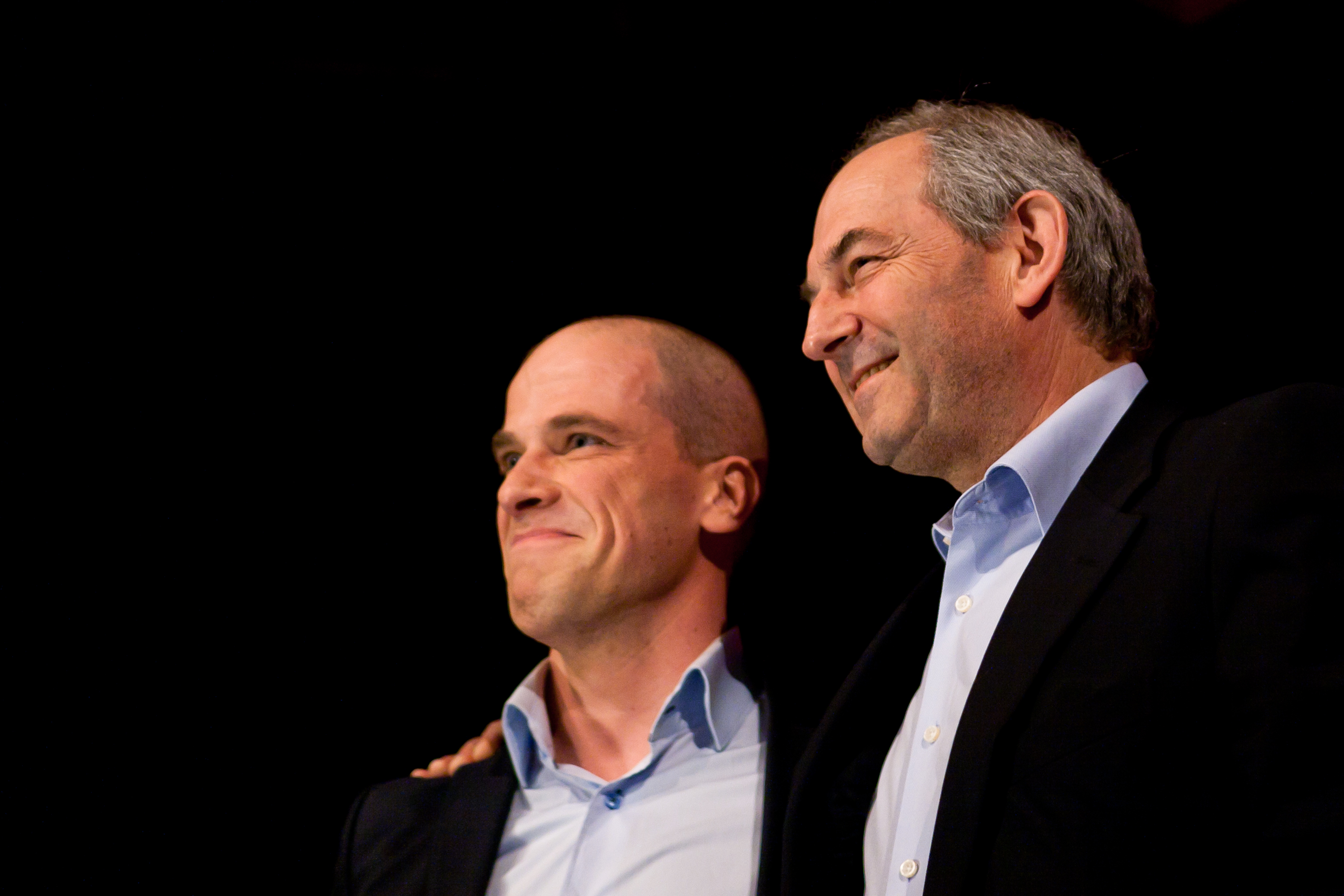
Newly elected Leader of the Labour Party Diederik Samsom and Job Cohen at a party conference in Rotterdam on 21 March 2012

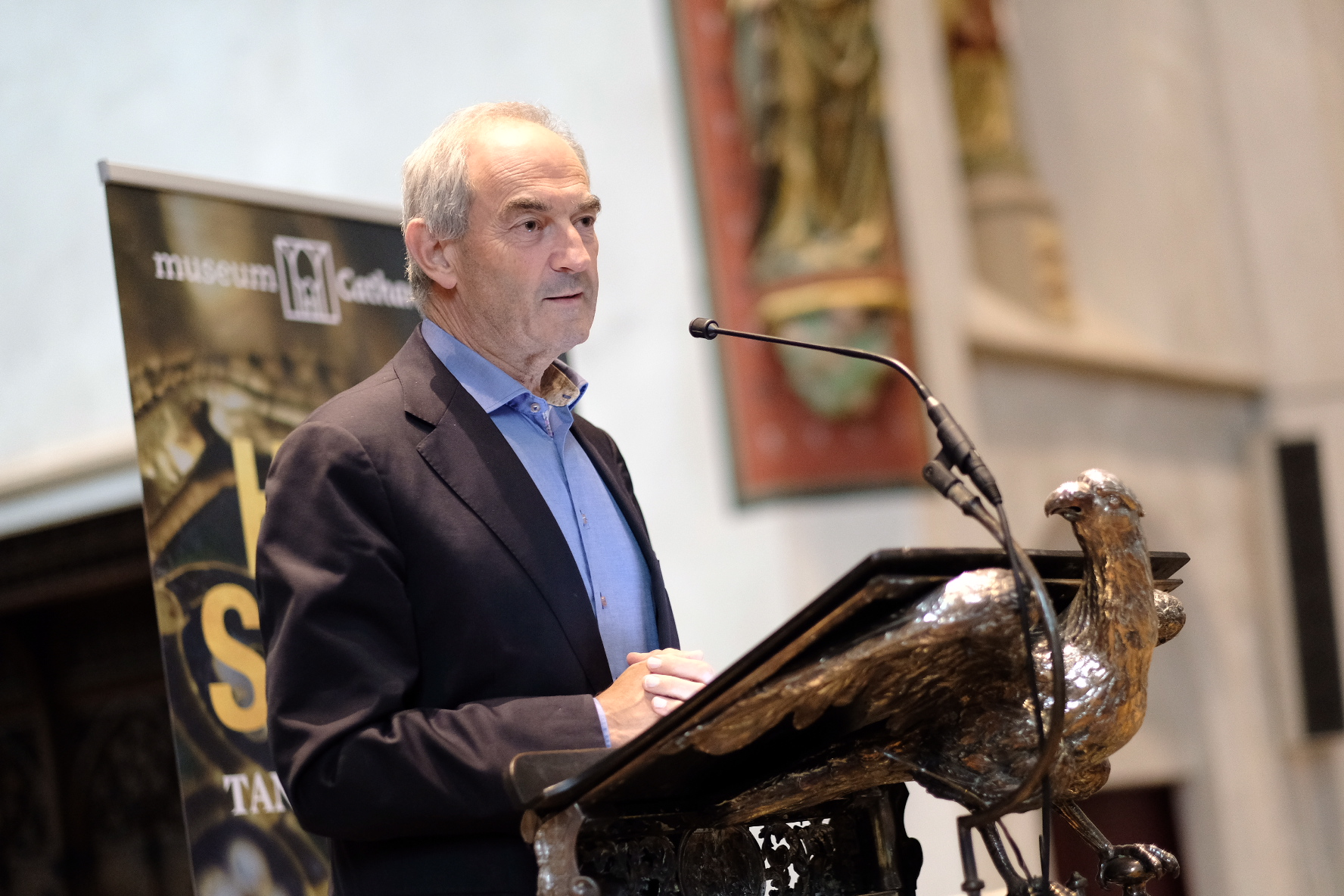
Job Cohen during a presentation at the Museum Catharijneconvent in Utrecht on 6 October 2016

=== Academic career ===
Between 1 September 1971 and 1 September 1981, Cohen held a scientific position at the Bureau Research of Education at Leiden University. He obtained a doctorate (PhD) from this university in June 1981, with a dissertation on the rights of university students.

On 1 September 1981, he joined the State University of Limburg in a higher scientific capacity, and was chairman of the commission that prepared the establishment of a faculty of law. On 1 September 1983, Cohen became professor of methods and techniques at the faculty of law; on 1 January 1991 he also became rector magnificus of the State University of Limburg. He resigned from this position to become State Secretary for Education and Sciences in 1993.

In 1995 Cohen returned to his position in Maastricht as professor and rector magnificus at Maastricht University (the former State University of Limburg). From 1 January 1998, he took a sabbatical year, but he resigned in August 1998 when he became State Secretary for Justice.

Cohen has received two honorary degrees for his contributions to law and society, one in 2007 from the University of Windsor and one in 2008 from the Radboud University Nijmegen.

=== Political career ===
==== State Secretary for Education and Sciences ====
On 2 July 1993, Cohen became State Secretary (deputy minister) for Education and Sciences in the third cabinet of Ruud Lubbers, under education minister Jo Ritzen. In Cohen's portfolio were higher and academic education, science policy, and adult education. The term of this post expired after a year and Cohen returned to his academic post in Maastricht.

==== Member of the Senate ====
From 13 June 1995, Cohen was a member of the Senate of the Netherlands. Between 1 August 1996 until he resigned from the Senate on 3 August 1998, he was also the parliamentary group leader of the Labour Party in the Senate.

During his period in the Senate, he also worked for the Maastricht University, where he began a sabbatical year on 1 January 1998. In February 1998 however, he took on the function of interim-director of the broadcasting organization VPRO, lasting until 15 August.

==== State Secretary for Justice ====
On 3 August 1998, he resigned from the Senate to take up the position of State Secretary for Justice in the second cabinet of Wim Kok, dealing chiefly with immigration. In this capacity he was responsible for a new immigration law, intended to restrict entry of refugees to "genuine cases".

==== Mayor of Amsterdam ====
He resigned his position as State Secretary on 31 December 2000 in order to take up the position of Mayor of Amsterdam (burgemeester) on 15 January 2001. Mayors of Dutch cities are appointed by the cabinet in the name of the monarch.

At midnight on 1 April 2001, Cohen became the first public official to wed same-sex couples, following the passing of legislation opening up marriage to people of the same gender (see same-sex marriage in the Netherlands).

On 2 February 2002, Job Cohen performed the civil marriage of Prince Willem-Alexander and Máxima Zorreguieta in the Beurs van Berlage in Amsterdam.

In November 2004, controversial film maker Theo van Gogh was killed in Amsterdam by a Muslim extremist. Time awarded Cohen the title "European Hero" in 2005, for his inclusive approach towards the Muslim community after the murder, defusing tension in the city.

Cohen found himself thrown into the role of mediator between the city's Muslims, the original Dutch population and other groups in the cultural and racial mix. Almost half Amsterdam's residents are of non-Western descent, a majority of them Muslims."Islam is here to stay, in this country, in this city (...) We have to deal with Islam as a fact, not whether we like it. So the real question is how to get on with each other." Cohen took pride in the fact that in Amsterdam no violence or arson occurred in response to the killing. By his visiting ethnic groups, organizing debates among religious leaders and his listening and promoting dialogue, he received from opponents the mocking nickname of "tea drinker" – an image that would be exploited by them when he returned in the Dutch national politics in 2010.

On 27 January 2006, Cohen announced he would be willing to serve a second term as mayor of Amsterdam. On 12 July 2006, the municipality of Amsterdam almost unanimously (Democrats 66 opposed, being in favour of an elected mayor) supported Cohen to prolong his career as a mayor after 15 January 2007 when his first term ended.

Cohen's politics towards ethnic minorities in Amsterdam was characterized by the slogan "keeping things together" (de boel bij elkaar houden). On 2 May 2006, Immigration Minister Rita Verdonk of the centre-right VVD accused Amsterdam of becoming a "banana republic" with a lax safety policy; she cited the criminal liquidations and the disturbance caused by young people as examples of this. However, in the yearly crime meter of the Algemeen Dagblad Amsterdam did not perform particularly badly in safety policy and crime fighting. One of the reasons for this was Cohen's targeted approach towards those who commit multiple crimes (veelplegers). Cohen stated that his policy which combines soft and hard approaches, fighting crime and fighting the causes of crime, was the key to his successful safety policy.

In 2006 Cohen was the runner-up in the award for World Mayor of 2006, behind Melbourne mayor John So, and ahead of Harrisburg mayor Stephen R. Reed. World Mayor praised Cohen's leadership following the murder of Theo van Gogh in 2004, and his efforts at bringing together the diverse population of Amsterdam.

In late 2007, Cohen moved to reduce prostitution in Amsterdam, following allegations that Hells Angels and other organized criminals had taken over the prostitution industry. The city council bought 18 buildings in the red light district De Wallen from Charlie Geerts in order to convert them into upscale establishments and revoked the license of the luxury brothel Yab Yum.

==== Leader of the Labour Party ====
On 12 March 2010, Wouter Bos resigned as leader of the Labour Party. Bos named Cohen as candidate for the position, which he accepted. At the subsequent elections, Cohen was a candidate for Prime Minister. He was expected to be a strong opponent to Geert Wilders and was described in the press as "authoritarian but enlightened." Exit polls showed the Labour Party as the second largest with 30 seats and 19.6% of the total vote. Eventually his opponent Mark Rutte of the VVD became the Prime Minister of the Netherlands.

He has been chair of the Labour Party in the House of Representatives since 10 June 2010 and a member of the House of Representatives since 17 June 2010.

On 20 February 2012, he resigned as leader of the Labour Party, he also left the House of Representatives over criticisms that he had been too moderate towards the center-right Dutch government's planned economic austerity measures and the Dutch government's support for the EU Commission's plan to bail out Greece, which had been passed with the support of the Dutch Labour Party. At the time of his resignation, the Dutch Socialist Party, politically to the left of the Dutch Labour Party, had overtaken the Dutch Labour Party in a number of opinion polls.

=== Later life ===
Cohen and his second wife Anjes van der Linden moved to Maarssen around 2016. In his retirement, he served as chair of the supervisory board of NVVE, a Dutch right to die association, and he has been a guest speaker about World War II at schools.

== Honors and awards ==
- European Hero (2005), Time
- Best Mayor of the Last 25 Years (2005), Binnenlands Bestuur
- Citizenship Award (2005), P&V Foundation
- Honorary degree (2007), University of Windsor, Ontario, Canada
- Advertising Man of the Year (2007), Marketing Tribune
- Honorary degree (2008), Radboud University Nijmegen
- Martin Luther King Award (2008), DutchVersity
- Gold Medal (2010), city council of Amsterdam

== Works ==
Books (as author)

- Studierechten in het wetenschappelijk onderwijs (1981), dissertation
- Wandeling door een historisch besluit (2003)
- Binden (2009), collection of speeches and lectures

Audio books (as narrator)

- Het grijze kind (2007), novel written by Theo Thijssen
- De Uitvreter (2008), novella written by Nescio
- Lijmen/Het Been (2009), two novellas written by Willem Elsschot
- Kaas (2009), novella written by Willem Elsschot
- Titaantjes (2010), novella written by Nescio
- Max Havelaar (2010), novel written by Multatuli
- Reizen zonder John (2012), non-fiction written by Geert Mak
- Het dwaallicht (2013), novella written by Willem Elsschot
- De eeuw van mijn vader (2013), non-fiction written by Geert Mak
- De levens van Jan Six (2016), non-fiction written by Geert Mak

== Decorations ==
Honours
Ribbon bar	Honour	Country	Date	Comment
	Knight of the Order of the Netherlands Lion	Netherlands	8 October 1994	
	Knight of the Order of Orange-Nassau	Netherlands	30 April 2003	
	Grand Officer of the Legion of Honour	France	21 March 2006	
	Recipient Second Class of the Cross of Recognition	Latvia	23 October 2008	

== Notes ==
Party political offices
Preceded by Joop van den Berg	Parliamentary leader of the Labour Party in the Senate; 1996–1998	Succeeded by Johan Stekelenburg
Preceded by Wouter Bos	Leader of the Labour Party; 2010–2012	Succeeded by Diederik Samsom
Preceded by Wouter Bos; 2006	Lijsttrekker of the Labour Party; 2010	Succeeded by Diederik Samsom; 2012
Preceded by Mariëtte Hamer	Parliamentary leader of the Labour Party in the House of Representatives; 2010–2012	Succeeded by Jeroen Dijsselbloem
Political offices
Preceded by Roel in 't Veld	State Secretary for Education and Sciences; 1993–1994	Succeeded by Tineke Netelenbos as State Secretary for Education, Culture and Science
Preceded by Roel in 't Veld	State Secretary for Education and Sciences; 1993–1994	Succeeded by Aad Nuis as State Secretary for Education, Culture and Science
Preceded by Elizabeth Schmitz	State Secretary for Justice; 1998–2001	Succeeded by Ella Kalsbeek
Preceded by Guusje ter Horst; Ad interim	Mayor of Amsterdam; 2001–2010	Succeeded by Lodewijk Asscher; Acting
Business positions
Preceded by Iris van Bennekom	Chairman of the Social Welfare and Unemployment providers association 2013–present	Incumbent
Preceded by Aad Kosto	Chairman of the Copyright and Patent association 2013–2019	Succeeded by Fred Teeven
Non-profit organization positions
Unknown	Chairman of the Supervisory board of the Dutch Voluntary; Euthanasia association 2018–present	Incumbent
Academic offices
Preceded by Vic Bonke	Rector Magnificus of the State University of Limburg; 1991–1993; 1995–1998	Succeeded by Hans Philipsen
Preceded by Hans Philipsen	Rector Magnificus of the State University of Limburg; 1991–1993; 1995–1998	Succeeded by Arie Nieuwenhuijzen Kruseman
