= Dairy Campus =

Test farm and research centre

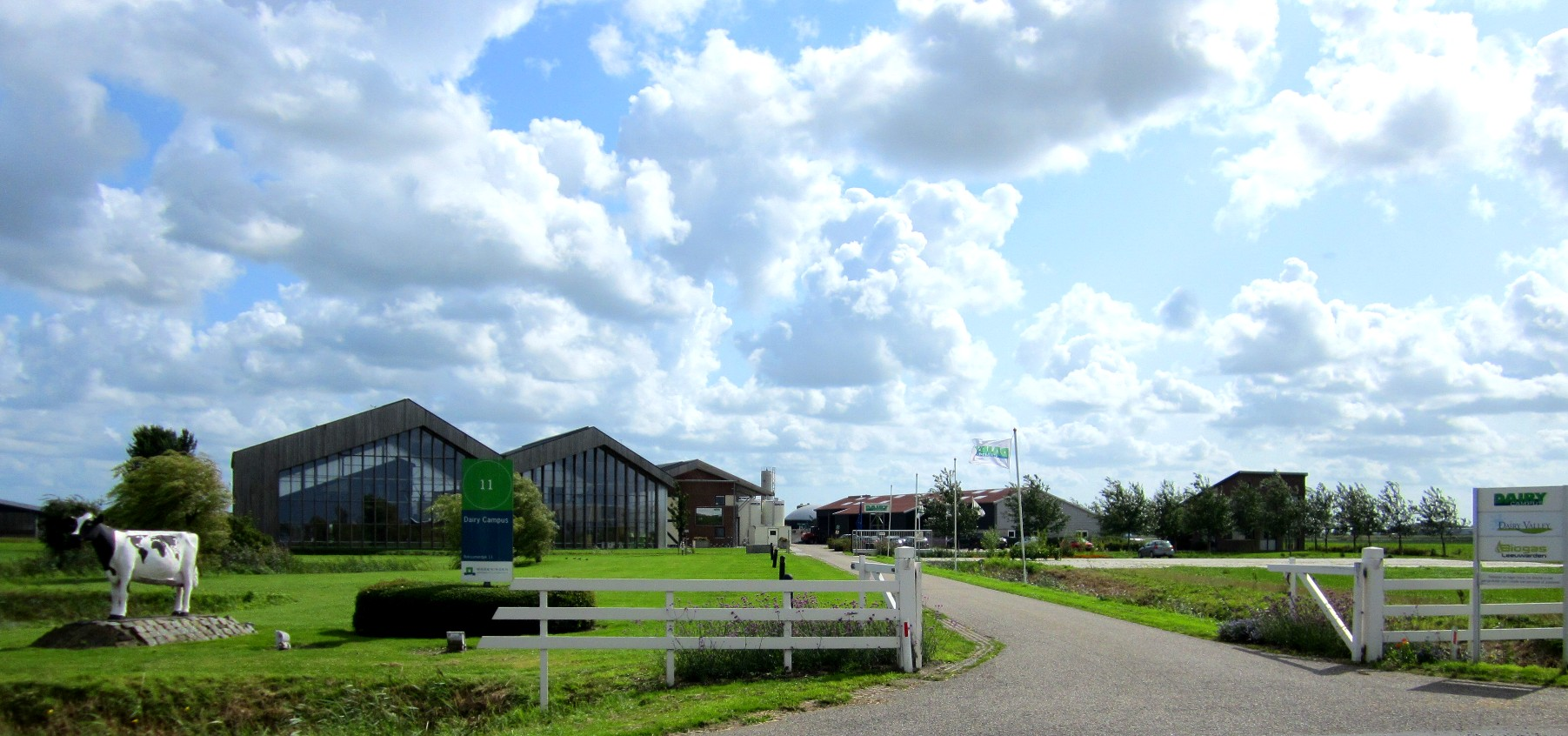
- Predecessor: Test Farm Nij Bosma Zathe
- Formation: 2011
- Type: test farm
- Location(s): Leeuwarden, Friesland, the Netherlands
- Parent organization: Wageningen University & Research
- Staff: ~20 (2019)
- Website: www.dairycampus.nl

The Dairy Campus in the Netherlands is a test farm and centre for scientific research and practical training in the field of dairy farming, located, the capital of the province of Friesland. The decision to launch this centre was made in 2011, and it was opened in 2016. The Campus traces its roots to the test farm Bosma Zathe, founded in Ureterp in 1944; its building complex was formerly called Nij Bosma Zathe (nij means "new" in the West Frisian language). Since 2000, the Dairy Campus has been part of Wageningen University & Research (WUR). All activities in the centre are focused on the development of sustainable methods for the production and processing of dairy products.

== History ==
In May 1944, the Centraal Instituut voor Landbouwkundig Onderzoek ("Central Institute for Agricultural Research", CILO), based in Wageningen, leased the dairy farm Bosma Zathe in the Frisian village of Ureterp for agronomic research. In 1956 this test farm was taken over by the (Frisian provincial) Christelijke Boeren en Tuinders Bond ("Christian Farmers' and Horticulturalists' Association", CBTB), which ran it for the following sixteen years. During a reorganisation in 1972, Bosma Zathe was transformed into a regional research centre (ROC). As such it became, from 1974 onwards, a collaboriation between the CBTB, the Friese Maatschappij van Landbouw ("Frisian Society of Agriculture") and interest groups of farmers and horticulturalists from the neighbouring Province of Groningen. Through a merger in 1995, the test farm became part of a national Stichting Praktijkonderzoek Rundvee, Schapen en Paarden ("Foundation for Practical Research into Husbandry of Cattle, Sheep and Horses"). From that point, the research which took place there was coordinated from Lelystad, in the central Dutch province of Flevoland.

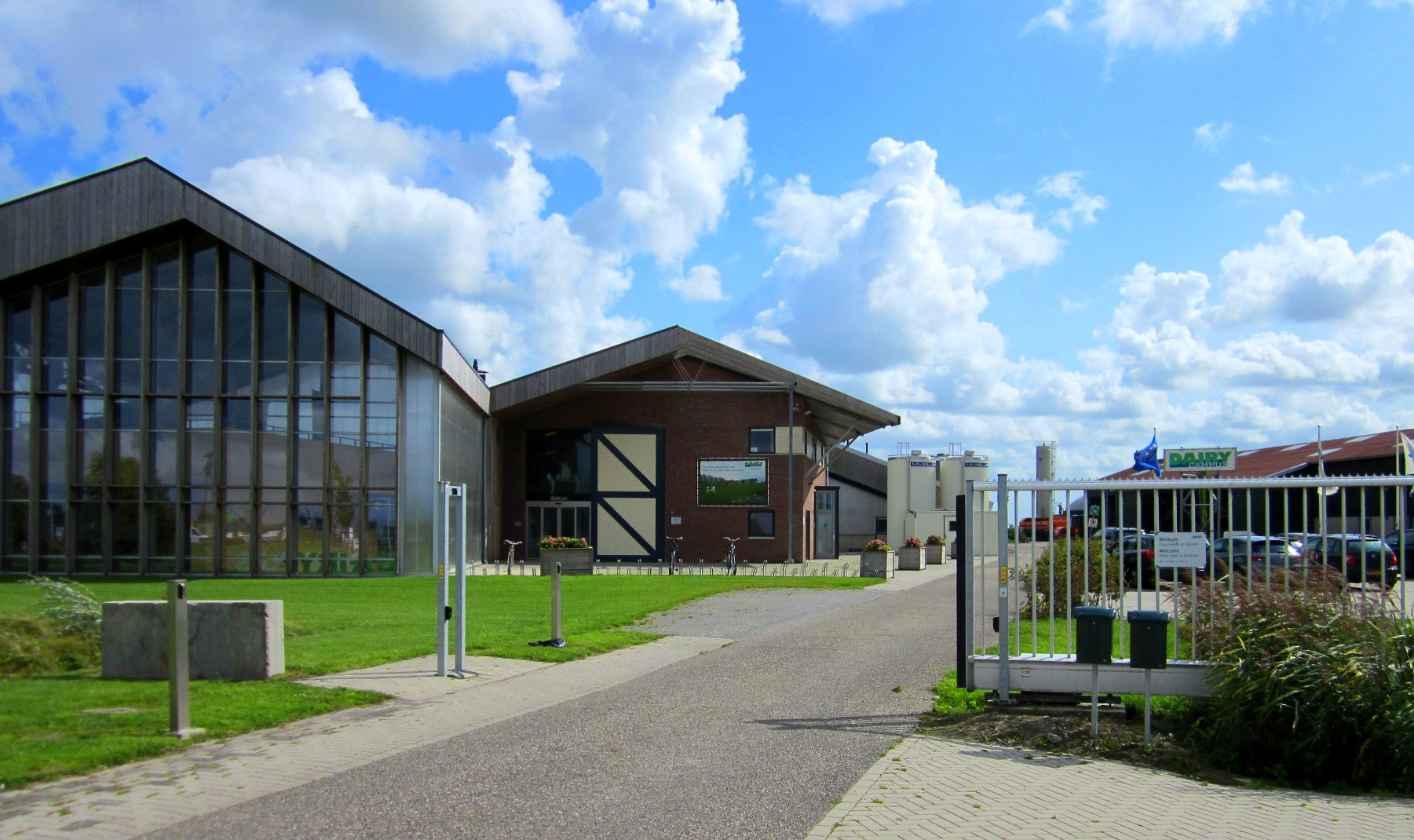
De Dairy Campus in Leeuwarden.

In 2000, the test farm Bosma Zathe was moved from Ureterp to the Boksumerpolder, near the Frisian capital of Leeuwarden, where it took the name of Nij Bosma Zathe (nij means "new" in the West Frisian language). The building complex in that location was newly built in 1999. Nij Bosma Zathe was officially opened by the Queen's Commissioner in the Province of Friesland Ed Nijpels on 6 December 2000. The entire moving operation cost in excess of 17 million Dutch guilders. Afterwards, Nij Bosma Zatha, together with the other five Dutch regional research centres in the field of dairy farming (Cranendonck, De Vlierd, Zegveld, Aver Heino and Waiboerhoeve), became part of Wageningen University & Research (WUR). Nij Bosma Zathe's function was that of centre for practical research for the dairy farming area of the northern Netherlands region (nl). In 2001 the test farm was grouped with the Praktijkonderzoek Veehouderij ("Practical Research Animal Husbandry"), an independently operating part of WUR. At that time Nij Bosma Zathe was made up of two residential dwellings, a (traditional) barn, a dairy barn with room for 184 cows, a barn for young cattle with facilities for calving, and a shed for agricultural machinery.

Because of the discontinuance of the Landbouwschap, an organisation which had imposed a collective tax on Dutch farmers from which practical research was paid, budget cuts to the test farms became inevitable. In 2008-2009 all parties involved came to the agreement that the test farms for dairy farming would by brought together in one location. The intention was to establish a single national knowledge centre for innovation, scientific research, education and practical learning in the field of dairy farming and the production and processing of dairy products, named 'Dairy Campus'. Leeuwarden was named as the location of the newly centralised test farm, but that plan ran into opposition from the Animal Science Group of Wageningen University, who considered that a concentration of the test farms for dairy farming at Waiboerhoeve, near Lelystad, the largest test farm in the Netherlands, was a more central location.

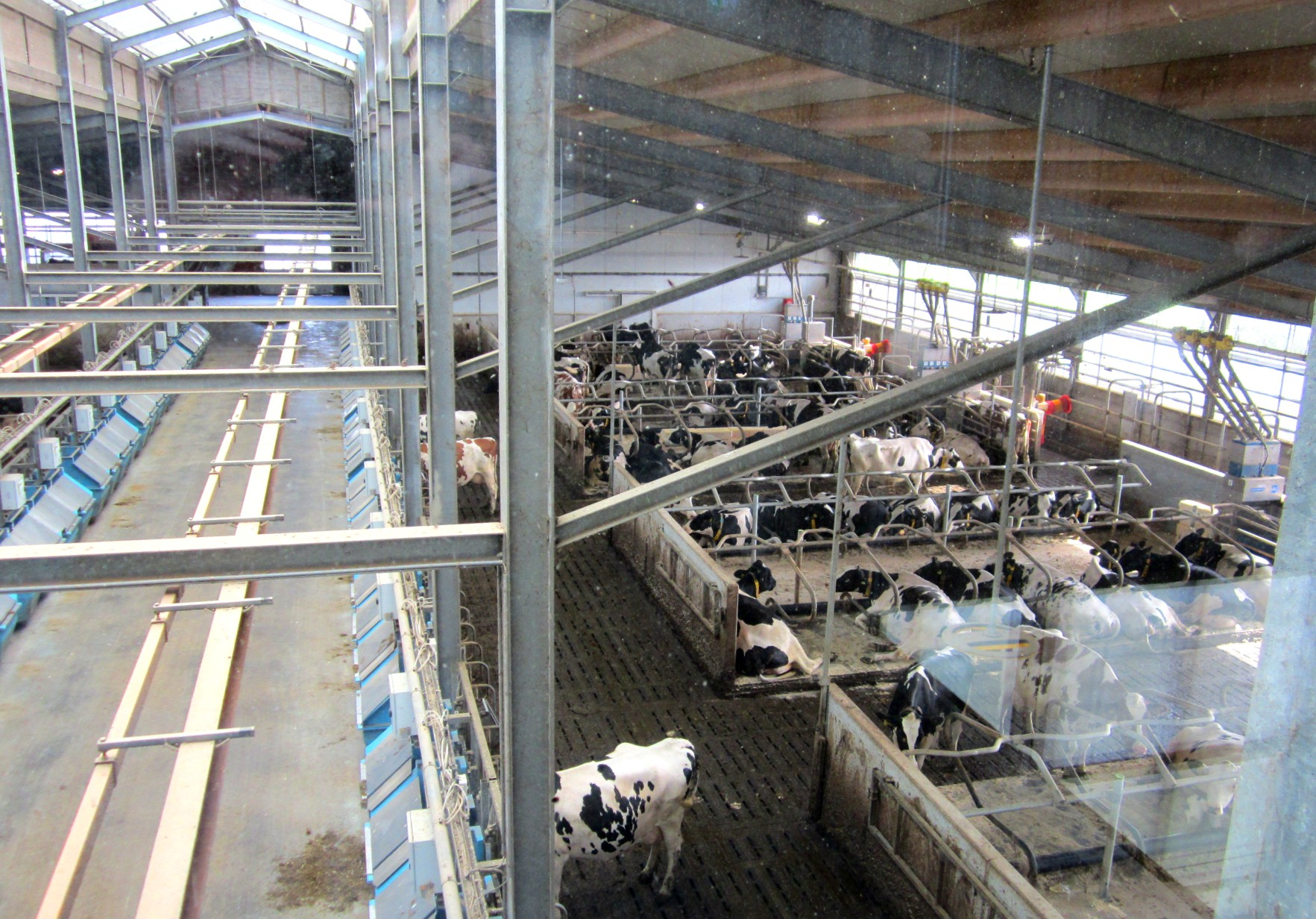
Inside a dairy barn where scientific research is conducted into feedstuffs and efficient feeding. The bluish containers are where the feed is deposited. Each cow wears a collar with a chip which allows it access to a single container. In that way the efficacy of the feedstuffs can be measured by milk output.

In the end the decision that the Dairy Campus would be located at Nij Bosma Zathe was taken in 2011 on the basis that Friesland is pre-eminently a dairy farming province, with a large number of organisations in the sphere of agriculture. Behind the scenes the Province of Friesland and the Municipality of Leeuwarden did some hard lobbying to get the Dairy Campus in Leeuwarden, among other things by promising €20 million in subsidies, a third of that for establishing the infrastructure and the rest for the curriculum and scientific research. Of that €20 million, €2.5 million came from the provincial government, another €2.5 million from the municipal government, and the remaining €15 million from the Frisian part of the Samenwerkingsverband Noord-Nederland ("Northern Netherlands Regional Cooperation", SNN).

At the end of the summer of 2014, the expansion of Nij Bosma Zathe was supposed to begin with the construction of four new dairy barns and a new reception facility. However, the plans were delayed because of new budget cuts. In the end it was not until February 2015 before the expansion could begin. Overall it would cost €9 million. It had been intended that Nij Bosma Zathe would be the only Dutch test farm for dairy farming from 2015 on, but in the event the Dairy Campus was divided between two locations until the beginning of 2016, namely Nij Bosma Zathe and Waiboerhoeve, near Lelystad. Only after the construction work at Nij Bosma Zathe was completed, were all activities centralised in Leeuwarden. The Dairy Campus was formally opened by State Secretary for Economic Affairs Martijn van Dam, on 26 May 2016. In August 2018 Prime Minister Mark Rutte visited the Dairy Campus. From 2016 onwards, over a period of ten years, €40 million were invested in the Dairy Campus, of which €1 million became available for innovation projects on a yearly basis. Half of that money was made up of subsidies by the Province of Friesland and the Municipality of Leeuwarden, while the remaining half was provided by Wageningen University and partners in the private sector.

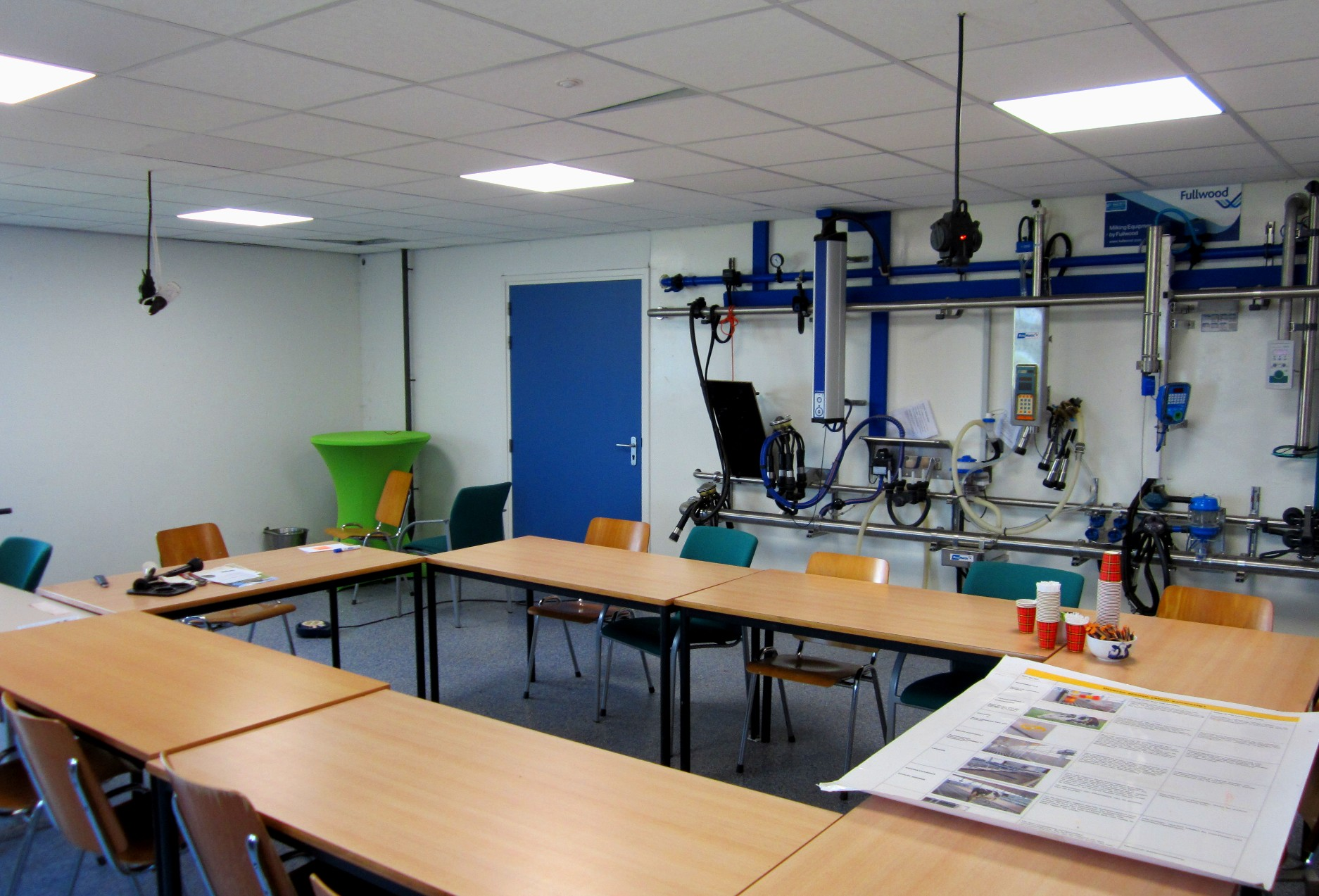
A Dairy Campus classroom for practical training.

== The Dairy Campus today ==
In 2019 the Dairy Campus consists of a reception and presentation building, conference rooms, training areas, manure facilities, ponds to purify effluent a rotary milking parlor, and six dairy barns, each with its own function, such as raising young cattle, the processing of manure, and research into the accumulation of ammonia, life expectancy, grazing systems, and feedstuffs and efficient feeding. The test farm has 18 permanent employees (more than half in farming positions and the remainder in the office) and 550 milch cows (not counting a couple of hundreds heads of young cattle). Furthermore, it also includes 300 hectares of pasture. More than thirty research and innovation projects are being conducted at any time. Apart from its status as a knowledge and research centre, the Dairy Campus is also an enterprise, which has to pay for itself. Half of all proceeds comes from supplying milk to FrieslandCampina, and the other half is derived from sponsoring of scientific research. Installment of a new gas installation, in December 2018, made the biogas from the biofermenter, which had been placed in the Dairy Campus by Biogas B.V., suitable to supply to the public gas net.

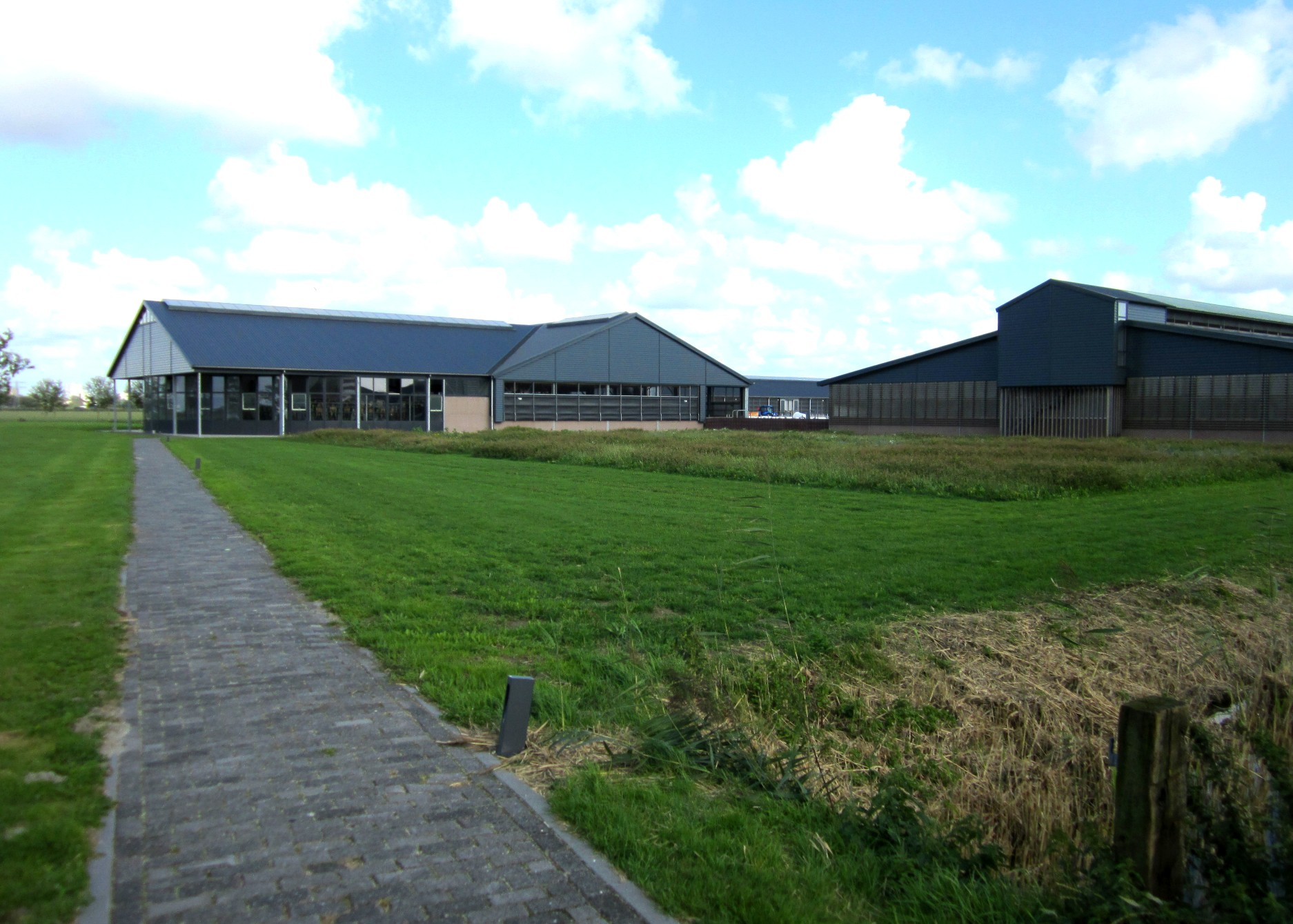
The dairy barn with the rotary milking parlor, where most of the cows at the Dairy Campus are milked.

== Activities ==
The Dairy Campus is the (only remaining) centre for scientific research and practical training in the field of dairy farming in the Netherlands. The test farm is used to gather data which can be employed to invent new, innovative ways of running a farm and processing dairy products. As a subdivision of Wageningen University, the Dairy Campus focuses on achieving and promoting close cooperation between the scientific community, education and the agricultural sector. Students from middelbaar beroepsonderwijs (job-oriented secondary education), hoger beroepsonderwijs (job-oriented higher education) as well as universities can perform the practical stages of their education at the Dairy Campus or take classes in practical training there. It is also possible for them to get busy exploring scientists' ideas in provisional research projects. And companies can pay to have their products tested in the suitable environment of the Dairy Campus.

The test farm sees itself as a(n) "(inter)nationally leading centre where research, innovation, education, practical training and the dissemination of knowledge of the entire dairy production and processing chain are brought together." The intention of the institute is to raise dairy farming to a higher level vis-à-vis economic profitability, environmental concerns, animal welfare and social acceptance. The Dairy Campus wants to become the most important centre for innovation in the Netherlands, thereby evolving into "the Silicon Valley of and for the entire dairy farming sector." All activities in the centre are focused on the development of durable methods for the production and processing of dairy products.

== Cooperation ==
The Dairy Campus is cooperating closely with a large number of companies, research centres, educational institutes, government agencies and interest groups. Among those are of course other subdivisions of Wageningen University, but also Nordwin College (nl), Van Hall Larenstein University, Rijksuniversiteit Groningen, campus Friesland, LTO Nederland (nl), FrieslandCampina, the Municipality of Leeuwarden, the Province of Friesland and several educational institutes abroad. In 2013 practical training centre PTC+ in Oentsjerk joined the Dairy Campus under its new name Dairy Training Centre (DTC), after an earlier attempt at collaboration fell through at the start of 2011. Until it went bankrupt in December 2017, the DTC provided training for domestic and foreign groups at the Dairy Campus, concerning dairy farming and milk processing. This training program included contributions from agricultural employment agency AB Vakwerk as well as consultancy bureau The Friesian.

== Gallery ==
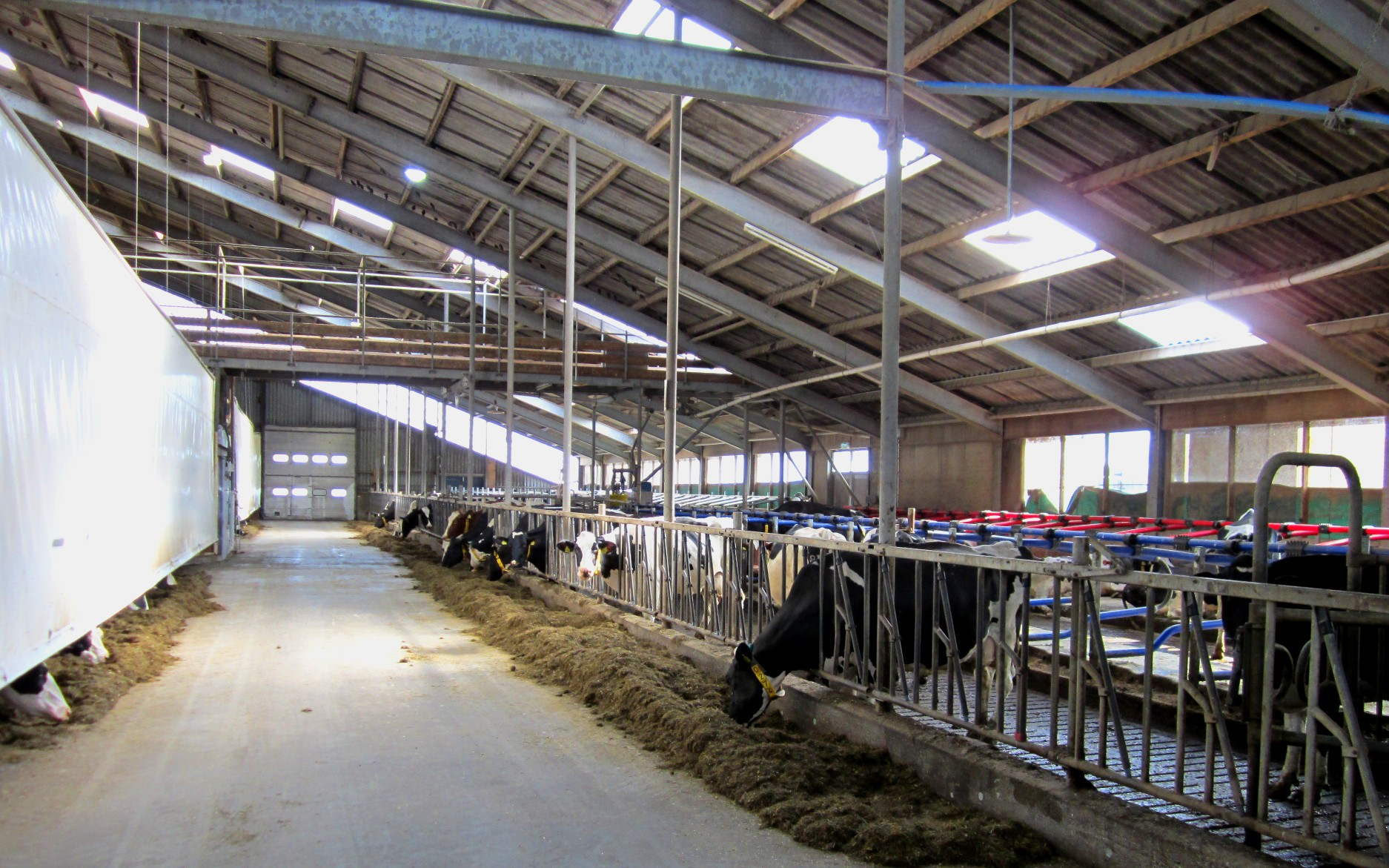
The dairy barn where scientific research is conducted into accumulation of ammonia.

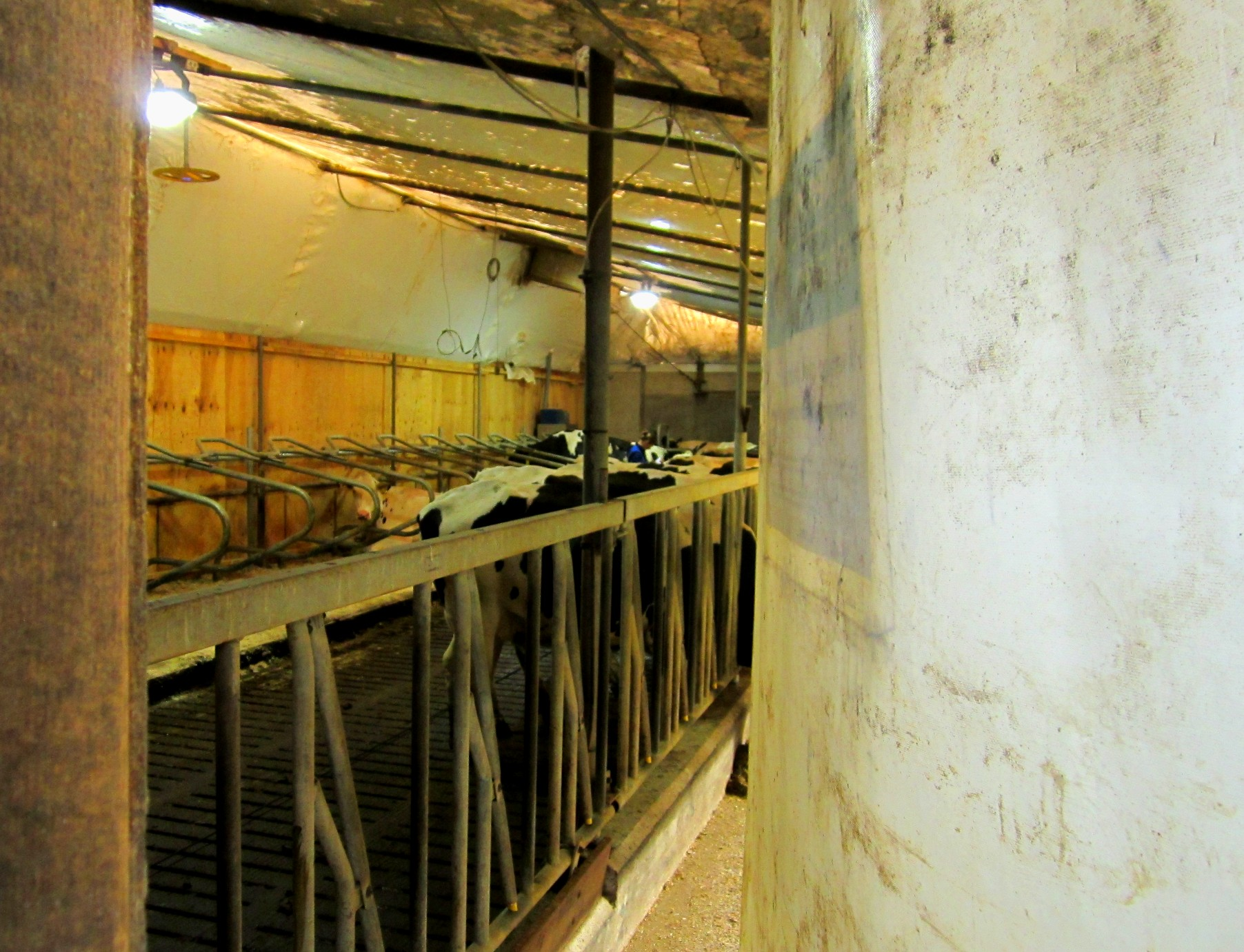
A view behind the canvas covering a part of the barn to keep the ammonia in.

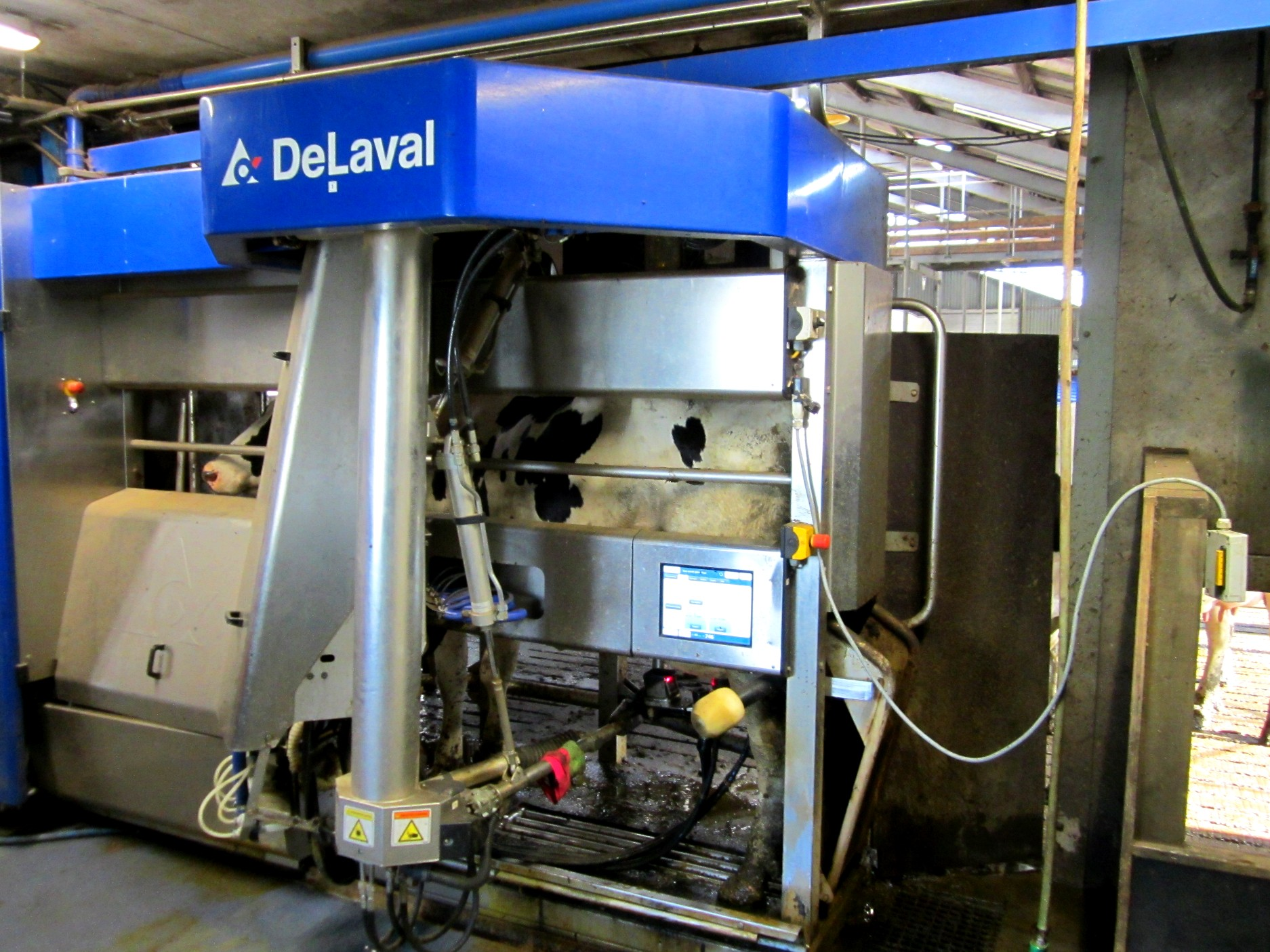
An automatic milking system milking a cow.

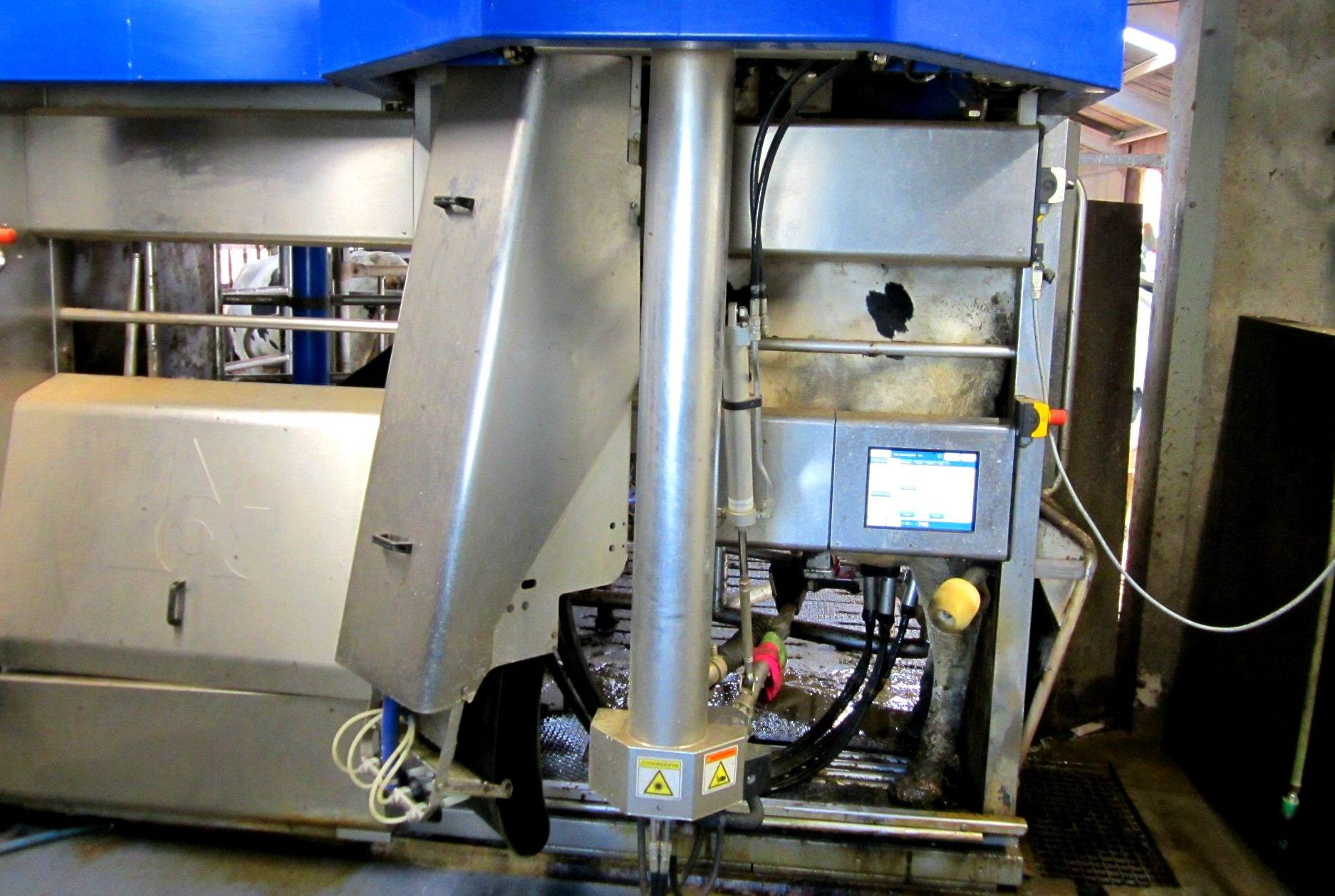
An automatic milking system milking a cow.

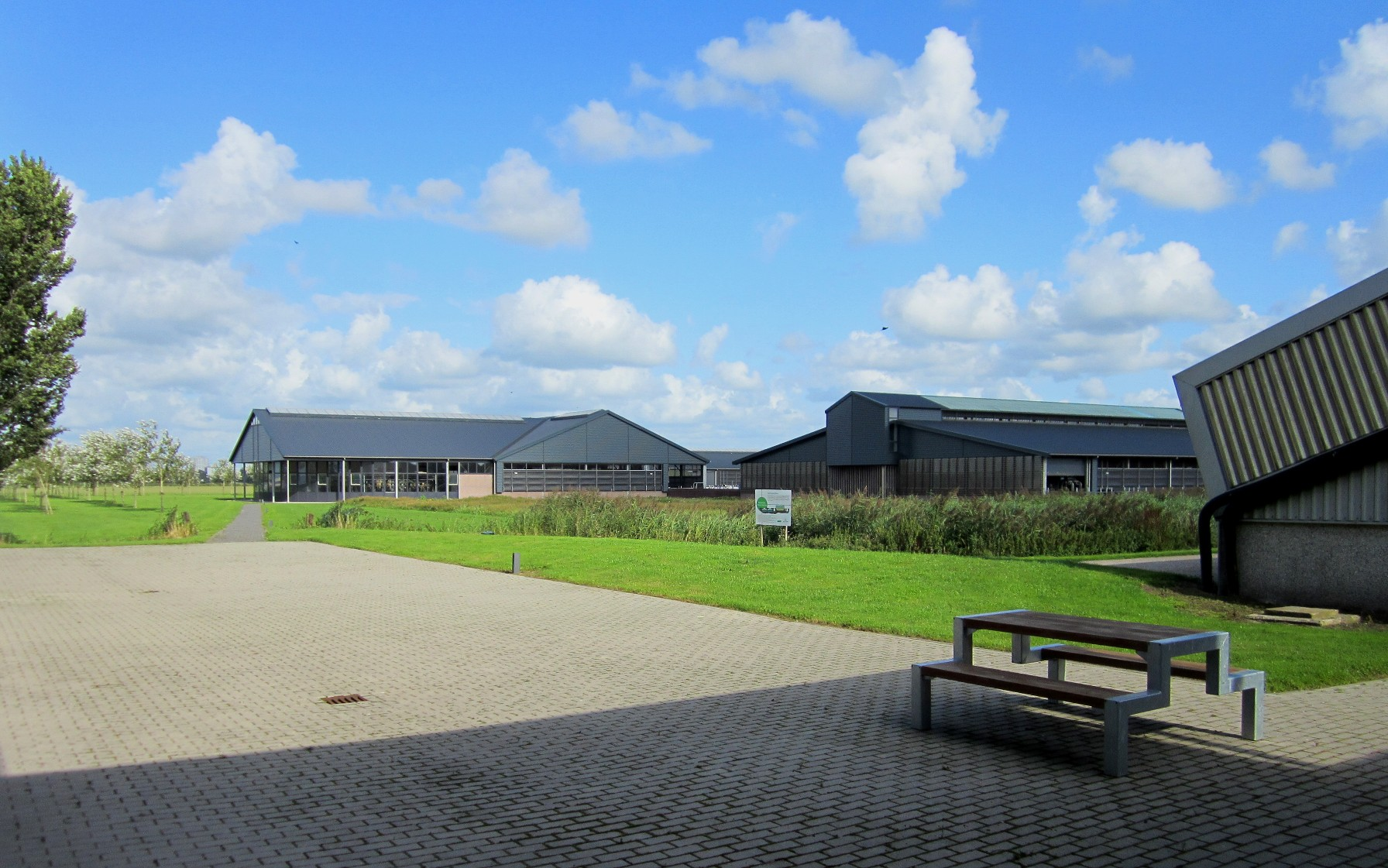
View of the dairy barns from the back of the reception area.

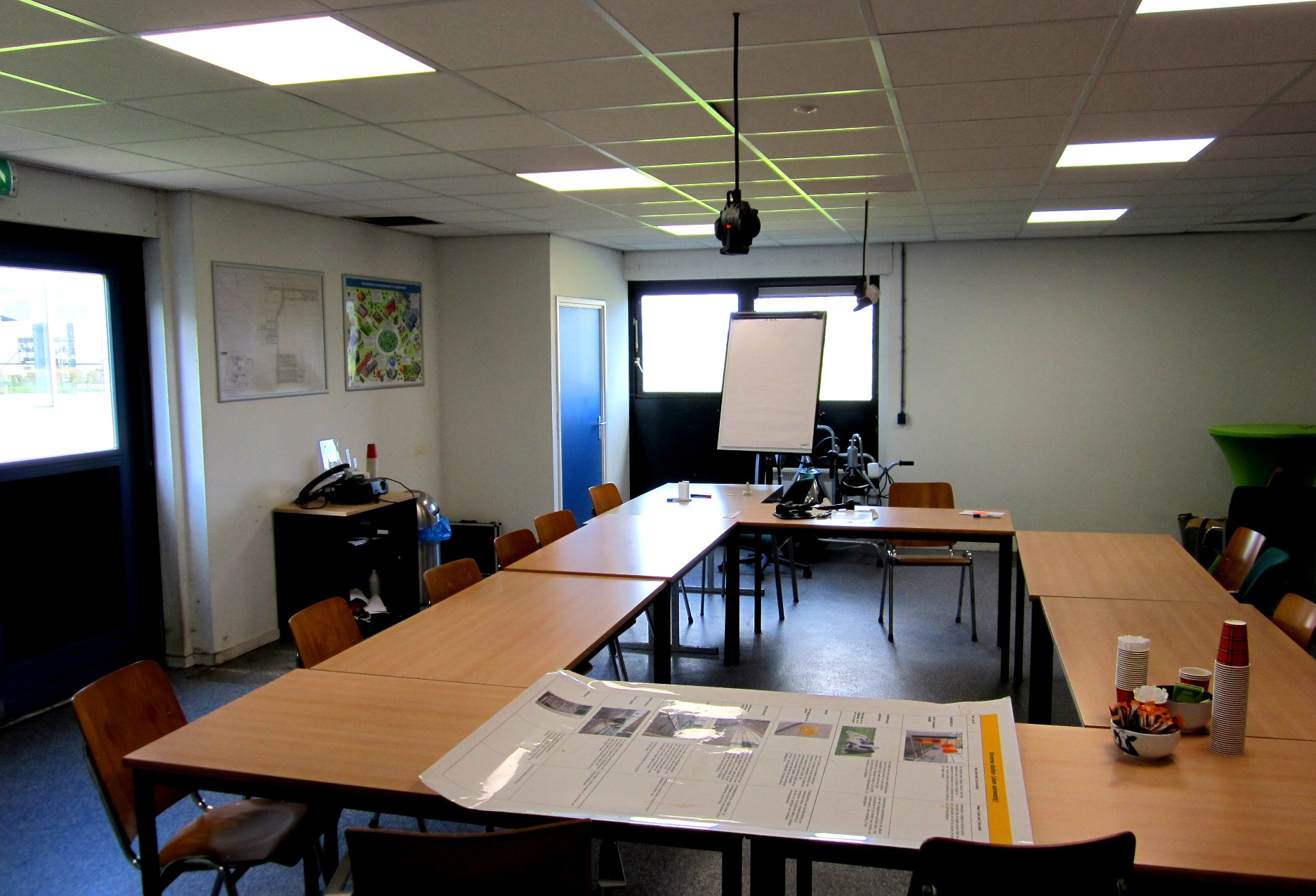
A class room for practical training.

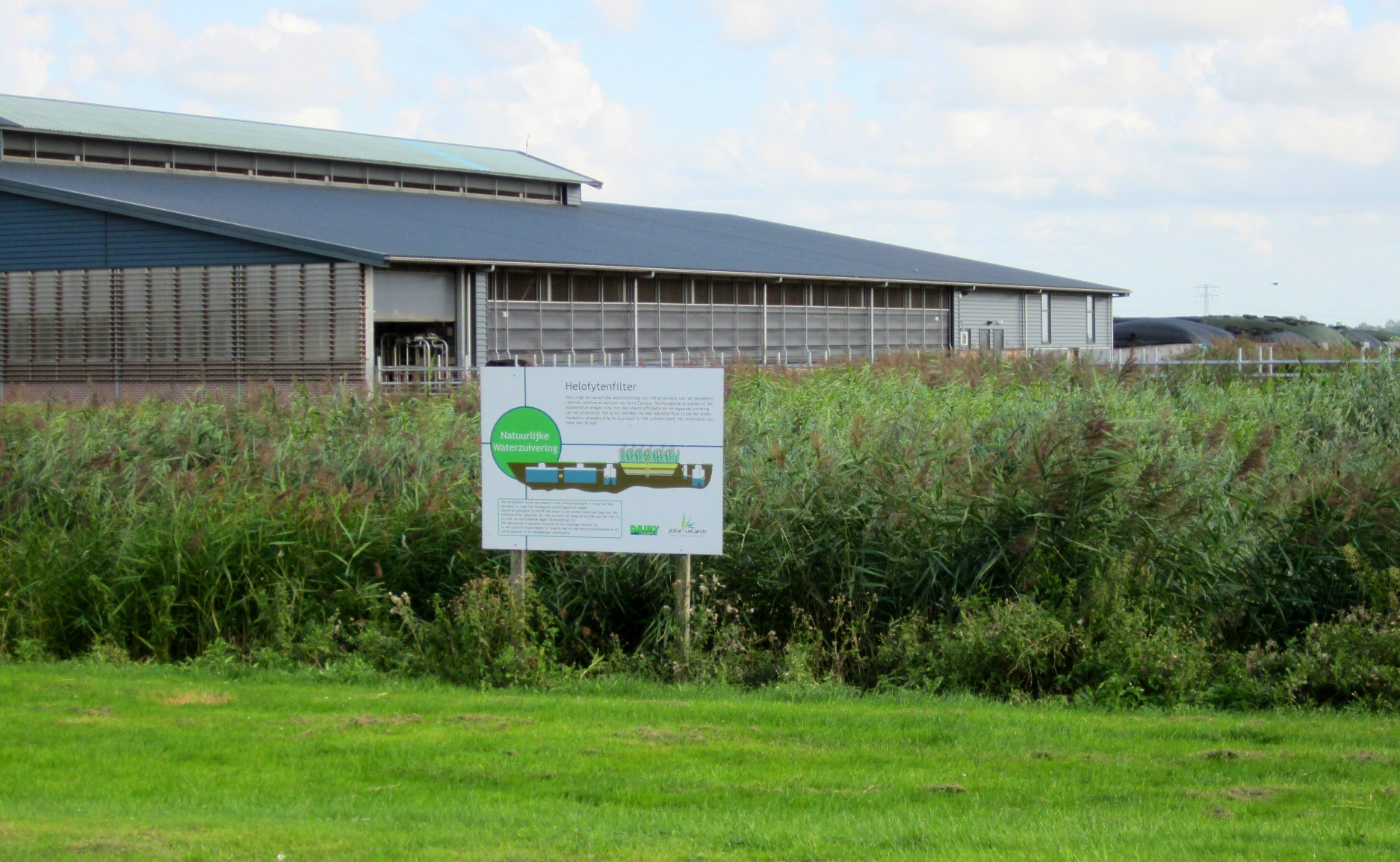
A pond where the effluent from the office building is purified.

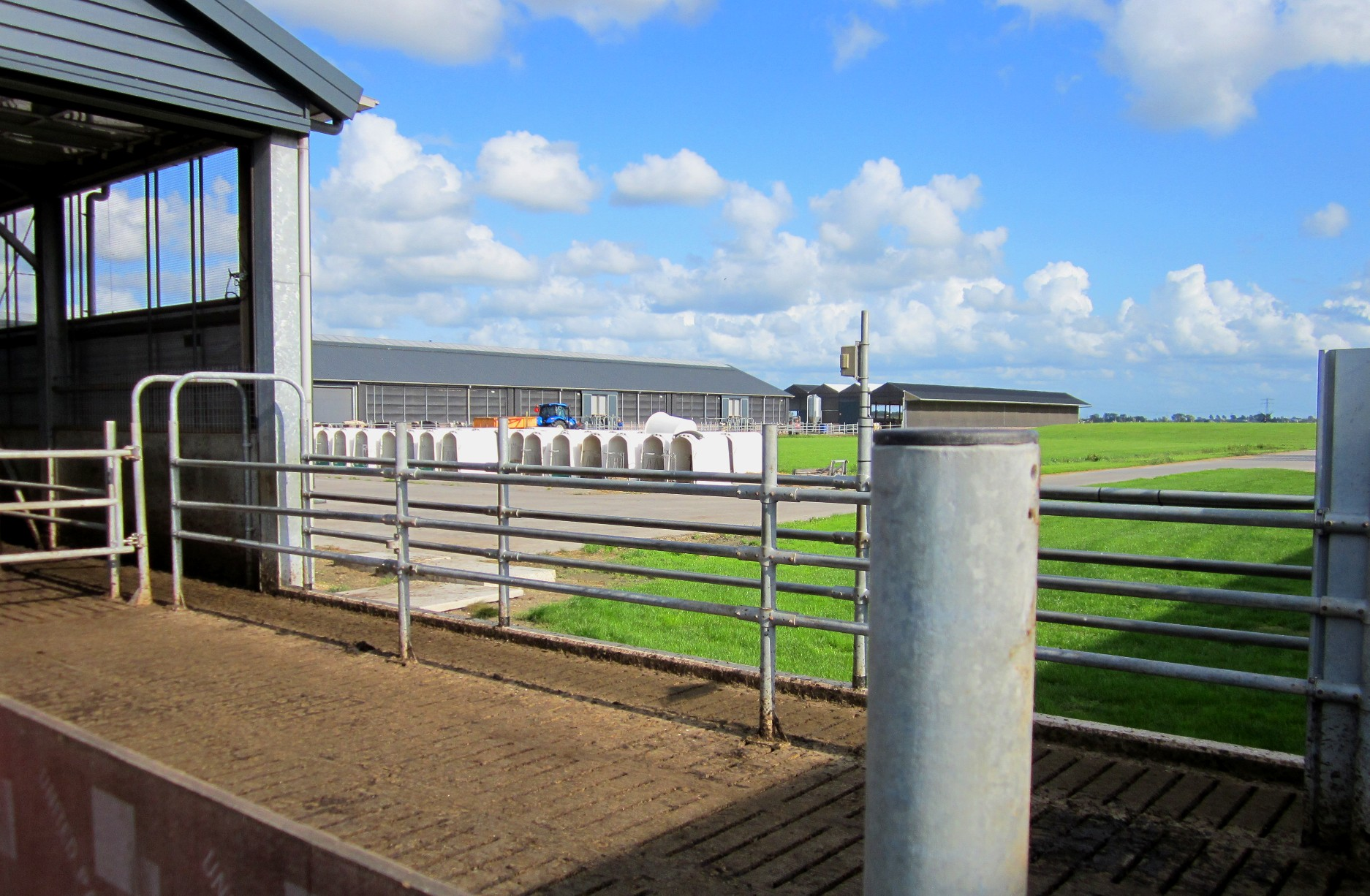
Where cows cross over from one dairy barn to the next to get milked.

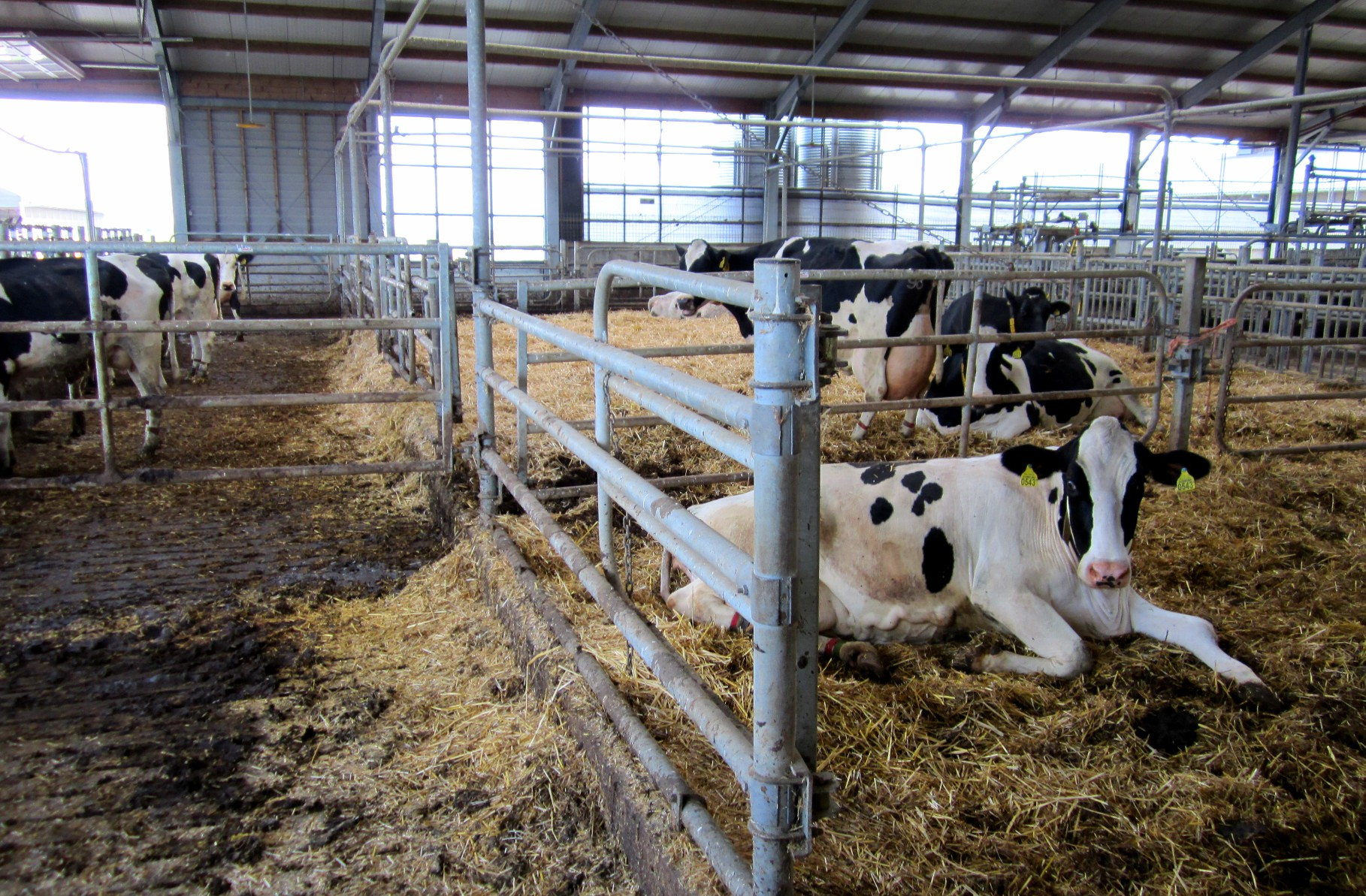
A barn where the cows are kept when they are in calf.

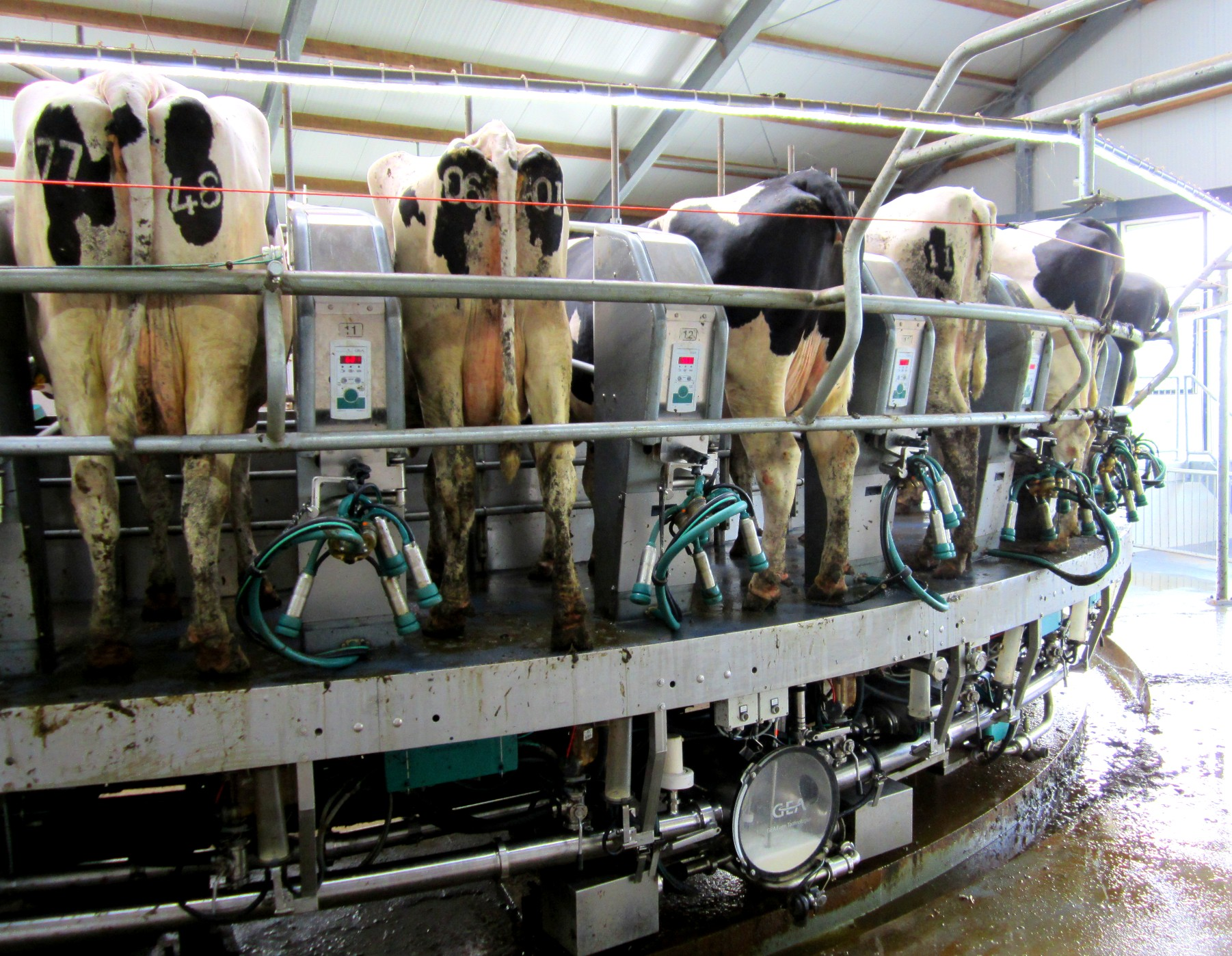
Cows being milked in the rotary milking parlor.
