= Cigar box (disambiguation) =

A cigar box is a box container for cigar packaging.

Cigar box may also refer to:

- Cigar box (juggling)
- Baker Bowl a.k.a. "The Cigar Box"
- Cigar Box method
- Cigar box guitar
