= Paul Struik =

Dutch agronomist

Paul Christiaan Struik
- Born: 27 November 1954 (age 71)
- Occupations: Agronomist, academic and author

Academic background
- Education: MSc; PhD
- Alma mater: Wageningen Agricultural University

Academic work
- Institutions: Wageningen University

Paul Christiaan Struik (born 27 November 1954) is a Dutch agronomist, academic and author. He is an Honorary Professor of the Chinese Academy of Agricultural Sciences and Adjunct Faculty staff member of the University of Bangalore, as well as an emeritus Professor in Crop Physiology at Wageningen University. Struik's research primarily focuses on agrobiodiversity, potato physiology, seed systems science, integration of social and natural sciences, and modelling of photosynthesis.

He has authored and co-authored more than 735 journal articles and edited or wrote more than 16 books including Seed Potato Technology, Plant Production on the Threshold of a New Century, Crop Systems Biology: Narrowing the Gaps between Crop Modelling and Genetics and Crop Science: Progress and Prospects.

He was the principal academic advisor of 138 PhD candidates and contributed to the guidance of another 6 PhD candidates as co-supervisor.

He is the recipient of awards, including the 2019 International Crop Science Award from the Crop Science Society of America, and the 2022 World Potato Congress Industry Award. He was appointed Officer in the Order of Orange-Nassau by King Willem-Alexander in 2022.

Struik is a Fellow of the Association of Applied Biologists and the Editor-in-Chief of Potato Research.

== Education and early career ==
Struik earned an MSc in 1978 and a PhD in 1983, both from Wageningen Agricultural University, on research on the agronomic aspects of digestibility of forage maize. He worked as a Scientific Assistant from 1978 to 1981 and Research Agronomist from 1982 to 1986 at the same university.

== Career ==
Struik continued his academic career as a professor in Field Crops' Science at Wageningen Agricultural University from 1986 to 1995. He became Professor in Crop and Grassland Science at Wageningen University from 1995 to 1998, and later Professor in Crop Physiology from 1998 to 2023, since when he has been serving as emeritus Professor.

In 2019, Struik founded Stichting Corona to research the ethical implications of technological interventions in crops, farm animals, and ecosystems, including soil, and disseminate findings to society. He held positions on committees at ICARDA, including Vice Chair of the Board of Trustees in 2021, and organized international congresses, while also being involved in the European Association of Potato Research, initially as Secretary and Treasurer, and later as a Council Member. Furthermore, he has made media appearances through television and radio interviews for programmes including the RTL4 late-night talk show Barend & Van Dorp, AVRO/TROS EenVandaag, TROS Nieuwsuur and OBA Live (Radio 5).

== Research ==
Struik has contributed to the field of agronomy by studying crop physiology, plant breeding and various socioeconomic dimensions of agriculture, including food security, governance and ethics. In the 1980s and 1990s he collaborated with farmer activists and politicians, including Cees Veerman, Dick de Zeeuw, and Sicco Mansholt, to create change in the Dutch agricultural systems.

== Works ==
Struik has published books on crop science and plant production. He co-edited Plant Production on the Threshold of a New Century, discussing challenges and advancements across plant production sectors, aiming for sustainability by bringing together policy, economics, environment, and crop science to innovate farming practices and farming systems. With Xinyou Yin, he focused on bridging the gap between genomics and crop physiology through research in Crop Systems Biology: Narrowing the Gaps between Crop Modelling and Genetics, aiming to improve crop productivity under changing environmental conditions.

In the book Crop Science: Progress and Prospects, he compiled keynote papers from the Third International Crop Science Congress, offering an overview of challenges and prospects in the field. Thomas A. Lumpkin commented, "While this publication was designed by the editors to serve as a 'textbook for advanced professionals', many of its chapters will be of interest to all parties involved in this issue."

Struik's 2023 book Impact of Hybrid Potato: The Future of Hybrid Potato from a Systems Perspective discussed the potential of hybrid breeding technology in potatoes to address challenges related to poverty, food security, and climate change, particularly in remote and harsh environments. He also authored Seed Potato Technology, looking into global seed potato production, including propagation, quality assessment, multiplication techniques, and diverse seed supply systems. In a review for Experimental Agriculture, D.K.L. MacKerron remarked, "...the authors have presented us with a very wide-ranging overview of potato production and have done an excellent job of relating the underlying science of the potato plant to the practicalities of producing seed potatoes... This book is required reading for anyone wanting a well-written and readable account of potato production – seed or ware."

=== Crop physiology ===
Struik researched crop physiology throughout his career. During the final decades, he was active in the field of modelling photosynthesis at different levels of biological organization. He analyzed complex processes of leaf-level photosynthesis, emphasizing the balance between photon-induced electron transport, Rubisco-mediated carbon fixation, and triose phosphate utilization, thus illustrating physiological mechanisms in plant and crop growth.He also assessed the interdependence between micro-scale and whole-plant sink limitations by manipulating sink-source ratios in rice plants and studying gas-exchange data across different leaf treatments and nitrogen levels.

=== Seed systems ===
Struik studied seed systems by analyzing their breeding and genetic diversity. He explored the perspectives of commercial plant breeders on hybrid breeding systems, demonstrating their effectiveness in crop improvement but noting challenges, (for example, production costs) in their commercial application. His research investigated the importance of seed degeneration for various crops, including cassava and sweet potato, showing the potential benefits of techniques like positive selection, particularly in understanding the factors influencing viral load in plants. Morever, he investigated epidemics like purple top disease in Ecuador and bacterial wilt in Ethiopia, emphasizing the importance of coordinated responses and collective action to address such public health threats effectively, which endanger the potato crop.

Alongside colleagues, Struik investigated potato seed degeneration in the Andes, finding that farmers' varieties are resistant to degeneration and on-farm practices play a key role, suggesting partial seed replacement as a viable strategy. He also examined the impact of agroecological settings and seed recycling on potato seed degeneration in low-income countries, revealing heterogeneous effects across different altitudes and propagation cycles, indicating the complexity of seed degeneration processes.

=== Food security and biodiversity conservation ===
Struik's work on food security and conservation focused on their global influencing factors. In a collaborative paper that was conferred the 2017 Elsevier-Atlas Award, he showed how empowering rural women through participatory barley breeding programs can improve seed governance and, consequently, household food security in dry temperate regions. In another joint study, global changes in crop contributions to national food supplies were demonstrated, indicating increased reliance on a few globally distributed crops and greater interdependence among nations in food supplies and genetic resources. This paper received an International Center for Tropical Agriculture (CIAT) Original Research Publication Award in 2014.

Struik contributed to a study that presented an inventory of crop wild relatives in the United States, prioritizing 821 taxa for conservation efforts and showing the necessity for partnerships and prompt action.

== Awards and honors ==
- 2017 – Medal for supervising 100 PhD studies, Wageningen University.
- 2019 – International Crop Science Award, Crop Science Society of America
- 2021 – Honorary member of the Societas Studiosorum Reformatorum Wageningen (SSR-W)
- 2022 – World Potato Congress Industry Award
- 2022 – Officer in the Order of Orange-Nassau, King Willem-Alexander
- 2024 – Fellow, Association of Applied Biologists
- 2024 – Honorary member of the European Association for Potato Research

== Bibliography ==
=== Selected books ===
- Plant Production on the Threshold of a New Century (1994) ISBN 978–0792329039
- Seed Potato Technology (1999) ISBN 978–9074134651
- Crop Science: Progress and Prospects (2001) ISBN 978–0851995304
- Crop Systems Biology: Narrowing the Gaps between Crop Modelling and Genetics (2016) ISBN 978–3319205618
- Impact of Hybrid Potato: The Future of Hybrid Potato from a Systems Perspective (2023) ISBN 978–9086863921

=== Selected articles ===
- Ewing, E. E., & Struik, P. C. (1992). Tuber formation in potato: induction, initiation, and growth. Horticultural reviews, 14, 89–198.
- Haverkort, A. J., Struik, P. C., Visser, R. G. F., & Jacobsen, E. J. P. R. (2009). Applied biotechnology to combat late blight in potato caused by Phytophthora infestans. Potato research, 52, 249–264.
- Khoury, C. K., Bjorkman, A. D., Dempewolf, H., Ramirez-Villegas, J., Guarino, L., Jarvis, A., ... & Struik, P. C. (2014). Increasing homogeneity in global food supplies and the implications for food security. Proceedings of the national Academy of Sciences, 111(11), 4001–4006.
- Castañeda-Álvarez, N. P., Khoury, C. K., Achicanoy, H. A., Bernau, V., Dempewolf, H., Eastwood, R. J., ... Struik, P. C. ,....., & Toll, J. (2016). Global conservation priorities for crop wild relatives. Nature plants, 2(4), 16022.
- Struik, P. C., & Kuyper, T. W. (2017). Sustainable intensification in agriculture: the richer shade of green. A review. Agronomy for sustainable development 37, 39.
- Yin, Xinyou; Busch, Florian A.; Struik, Paul C.; Sharkey, Thomas D. (2021). "Evolution of a biochemical model of steady state photosynthesis. Invited Review". Plant, Cell & Environment. 44: 2811–2837.
