= Cigar Box method =

The Cigar Box Method is a toolkit which consists of a series of spreadsheets to help entrepreneurs, notably those in agribusiness in emerging markets, to calculate the costs of goods, margins, contribution, break-even quantity and profitability. It can be used for a single product or a complete portfolio of products. There are six Cigar Box (CB) categories:

- CB1: cost price analysis for one single product,
- CB2: contribution analysis for a range of products,
- CB3: daily monitoring of cost price for a range of products,
- CB4: investment analysis and financial projections with yearly cash flow,
- CB5: cost price based value chain analysis,
- CB6: customer satisfaction analysis.

== Origins ==
The Cigar Box Method was developed by Olivier van Lieshout and Anushik Tadevosyan. The method derives its name from pioneers in the 17th century Dutch Golden Age who were discussing foreign business deals while sipping coffee and smoking a cigar. When they needed to make quick business calculations, they often used the bottom side of the cigar box to convince investors about the profitability of their business ideas in a quick, concise and convincing manner.

== History and current use ==
The method was first used in 1999 as an analytical tool during a course on foreign direct investment (FDI) at the Wageningen University. It analyzed the suitability, including a risk analysis and potential benefits, of specific agricultural production processes for foreign investors. Between 1999 and 2012 over 180 students were trained in the use of the Cigar Box Method. It has since developed into a business analysis tool with multiple purposes and used by various targets groups: as analytical tool for foreign investors and bankers, as business planning tool for fruit and vegetable processing factories and business development service providers. An adapted version for women entrepreneurs in Africa has been developed recently. The method is described in the Agribusiness Handbook for Fruit and Vegetable Processing published by the Food and Agriculture Organization (FAO). The Cigar Box is being used daily by Bakery Initiatives Group as a navigator to bakery profit. Since 1999, over 500 people from all over the world have trained in the use of the Cigar Box Method during courses carried out by Wageningen Centre for Development Innovation (WCDI).

== Profit parameters ==
The Cigar Box Method of profit calculation uses only five parameters:

- P = Price (per unit)
- VC = Variable cost (per unit)
- FC = Fixed cost (per period)
- q = Quantity (in units per period)
- T = Tax (as % of profit).

More specifically, in (food) processing business, there are three types of variable cost: VC1 = Raw Materials and Ingredients, VC2 = costs of processing inputs into outputs, VC3 = costs of packaging materials, VC4 = cost of delivery. The fixed cost (FC) are also divided into three types: FC1 = depreciation of fixed assets, FC2 = interests paid, FC3 = overheads (salaries, transport, maintenance, ...), FC4 = cost of sales, marketing and advertising. Using these 5 parameters in simple formulas, a trained person can do a Cigar Box Profit analysis in half an hour. When data are missing, assumptions must be made using educated guesses.

== Profit calculation methods ==
There are three different methods to calculate profit. All use the same parameters and lead to the same result.

=== Bookkeeping method ===
    Sales - Total cost
     P*q  - (VC*q + FC)

=== Trader's method ===
    Profit per unit * units sold
    (P - VC - FC/q) * q

=== Cigar Box method ===
    Contribution - Fixed cost
    (P - VC) * q - FC

== Excel ==
The Cigar Box Method is an Excel-based model. Only one spreadsheet is needed per product. The Cigar Box Method purposely does not make use of specific software, is free of charge and is available in English, French, Russian and Spanish.
