= Wageningen Marine Research =

Dutch research institute

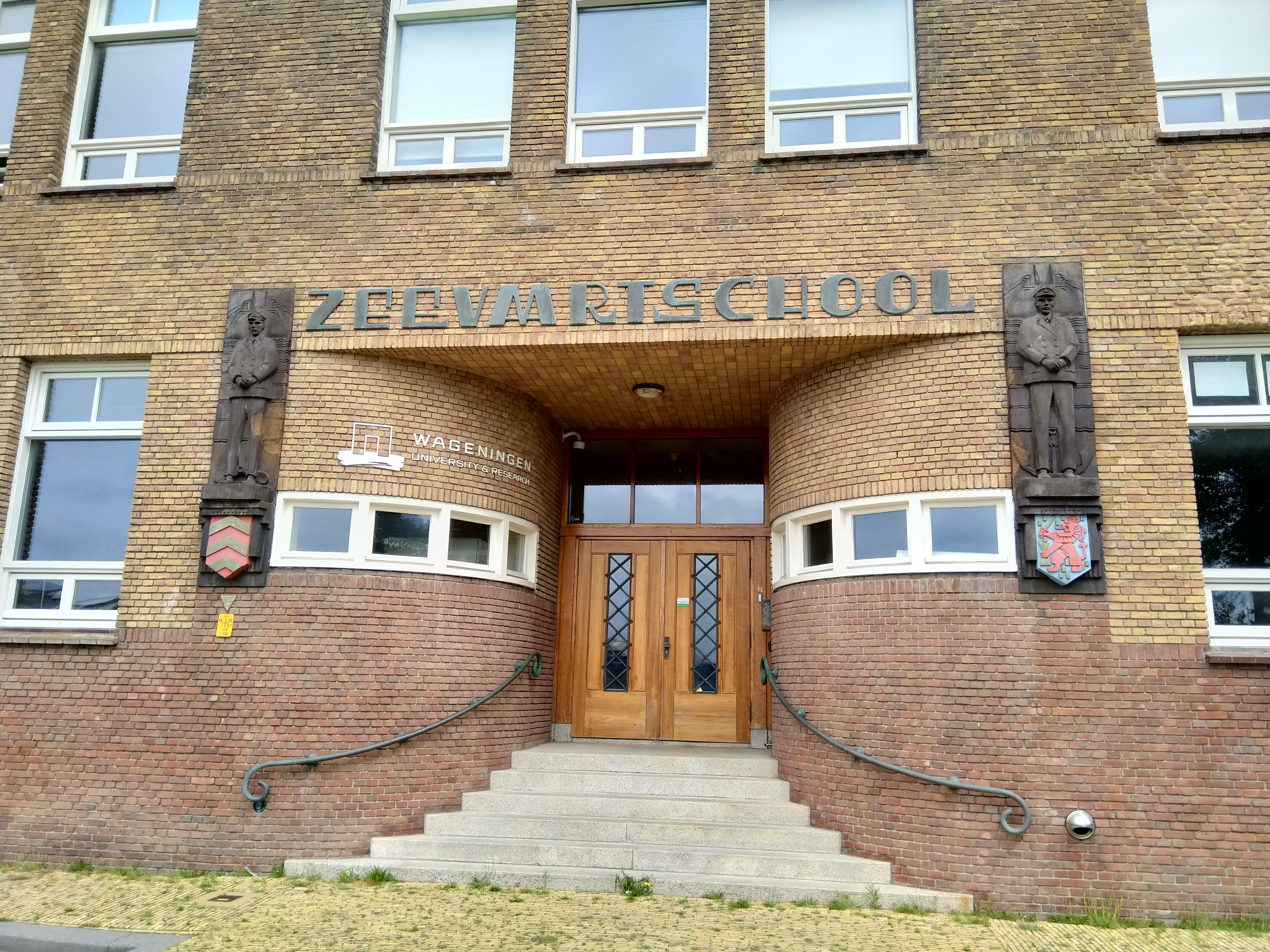
Wageningen Marine Research – location Den Helder. Building of the former Maritime School (pictured in 2024).

Wageningen Marine Research (WMR) is a research institute of Wageningen University & Research (WUR) which is focused on strategic and applied marine ecological research. Wageningen Marine Research was created in 2006 by the merger of the National Institute for Fisheries Research (Rijksinstituut voor Visserijonderzoek, RIVO), parts of Wageningen Environmental Research (WENR), and the Ecological Risk Department of Netherlands Organisation for Applied Scientific Research (TNO). The thus formed research institute has branches in IJmuiden, Yerseke and Den Helder and employs about 180 researchers. The institute changed its name in 2016 from IMARES (Institute for Marine Resources & Ecosystem Studies) to Wageningen Marine Research (WMR).

== Field of work ==
Wageningen Marine Research carries out research in the following fields of study:

- Nature
  - Ecosystem effects
  - Effects of infrastructural works
  - Advice on coastal and marine management
  - Stock surveys at sea
  - Climate and marine research
  - Fish migration in rivers
- The environment
  - Advanced analysis of chemical compounds in different matrices and tissue
  - Ecotoxicological analysis / Risk Assessment
  - Development of advanced risk models
  - Experimental facilities: (2-D) chemical laboratory; mesocosm setup
- Fisheries
  - Inland fisheries in the Netherlands
  - Coastal fisheries
  - Shrimp fisheries
  - Flatfish industry
    - Pelagic industry
  - Fisheries and the impact of fisheries
- Aquaculture
  - Shellfish cultivation
  - Seaweed farming

== See also ==
- Wageningen Environmental Research (WENR)
- Wageningen Food Safety Research (WFSR)
- Wageningen Social & Economic Research (WSER)
