= Potato Research =

- Discipline: Agriculture
- Language: English
- Edited by: Paul C. Struik

Publication details
- Former name: European Potato Journal
- History: 1958-present
- Publisher: Springer Science+Business Media on behalf of the European Association for Potato Research
- Frequency: Quarterly
- Open access: Hybrid
- Impact factor: 2.1 (2024)

Standard abbreviations
- ISO 4: Potato Res.

Indexing
- CODEN: PORHBW
- ISSN: 0014-3065 (print); 1871-4528 (web)
- OCLC no.: 797732648

Links
- Journal homepage; Online archive

Potato Research: Journal of the European Association for Potato Research is a quarterly peer-reviewed scientific journal covering all aspects of the production and use of potatoes. It was established in 1958 as the European Potato Journal, obtaining its current name in 1970. It is published by Springer Science+Business Media on behalf of the European Association for Potato Research. The editor-in-chief is Paul C. Struik (Wageningen University).

== Abstracting and indexing ==
The journal is abstracted and indexed in:

- AGRICOLA
- CAB Abstracts
- Chemical Abstracts Service
- Current Contents/Agriculture, Biology & Environmental Sciences
- EBSCO databases
- Elsevier Biobase
- EMBiology
- Food Science and Technology Abstracts
- Global Health
- ProQuest databases
- Science Citation Index Expanded
- Scopus

According to the Journal Citation Reports, the journal has a 2024 impact factor of 2.1.
