= Wageningen Food Safety Research =

Dutch research institute

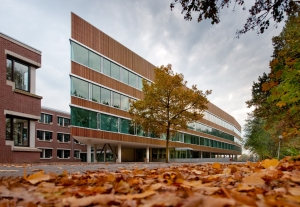
RIKILT building at the WUR campus

Wageningen Food Safety Research (WFSR) is a research institute for food safety, part of Wageningen University & Research (WUR) in the Netherlands.

== History ==
On the initiative of Minister of Agriculture Carola Schouten, articulated in a Kamerbrief (letter to Parliament) of 7 June 2018, the institute was established in 2019 by merging the existing RIKILT (WUR) and the Laboratory for Feed and Food Safety of the Nederlandse Voedsel- en Warenautoriteit (NVWA, an agency of the Ministry of Agriculture). A major reason for the merger was to establish a single organisation to support the NVWA and the Ministry of Agriculture, Nature and Food Quality (LNV, since 2024 LVVN) and Ministry of Health, Welfare and Sport (VWS) in incidents and crises in the field of feed and food safety, as well as food fraud.

== Activities ==
WFSR is an expertise centre for food and feed safety. The institute provides laboratory support to the NVWA and relevant ministries in the event of emergencies. It also conducts research in environmental incidents and (food) poisonings. In addition, WFSR functions as a national and European reference laboratory.

== See also ==
- Wageningen Environmental Research (WENR)
- Wageningen Marine Research (WMR)
- Wageningen Social & Economic Research (WSER)
