= Wageningen Environmental Research =

Dutch research institute

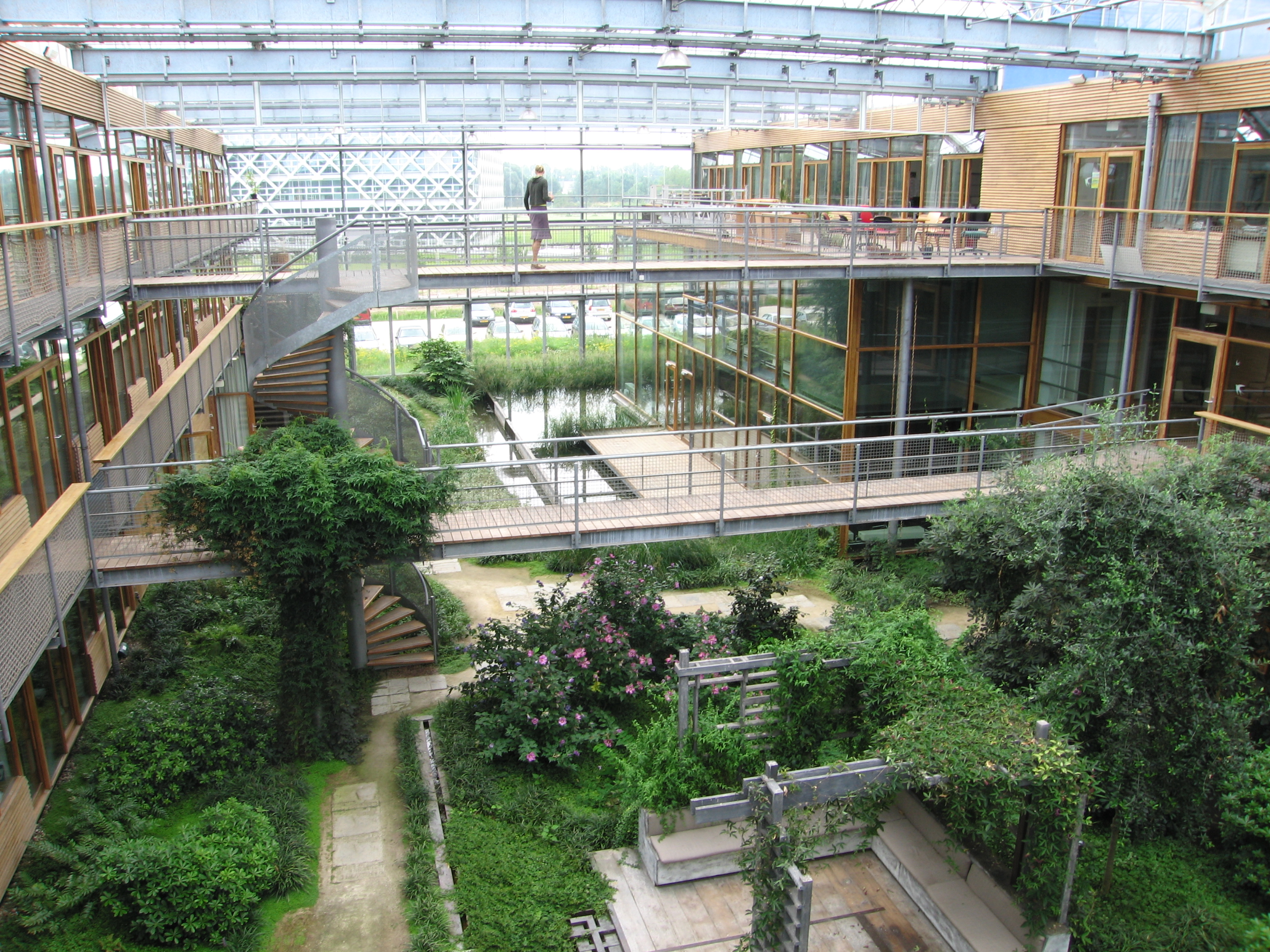
Interior of the Lumen building on WUR campus, seat of WENR's main office

Wageningen Environmental Research (WENR) is a research institute for the green environment, part of Wageningen University & Research (WUR) in Wageningen, the Netherlands. The institute was initially called Alterra; in 2016, the present name was adopted.

WENR conducts research for policy, management and design of green spaces on a local, national and international scale. The institute has knowledge and expertise in research areas such as water, soil, climate, landscape, nature, biodiversity, forestry, ecology, the environment, land use, spatial planning, geo-information, remote sensing and recreation.

Wageningen Environmental Research employs a total of over 400 people. The institute was formed in 2000 from a merger between the "Staring Centrum/Winand Staring Centre" (DLO-SC) and the Institute for Forest and Nature Research (Instituut voor Bos- en Natuuronderzoek, DLO-IBN). The Foundation for Soil Mapping (Stichting voor Bodemkartering) is one of its predecessors that had previously merged with a number of smaller institutes into the Staring Centre in 1989.

== See also ==
- Wageningen Food Safety Research (WFSR)
- Wageningen Marine Research (WMR)
- Wageningen Social & Economic Research (WSER)
- World Soil Museum
