= Marco Fraaije =

Dutch scientist (born 1968)

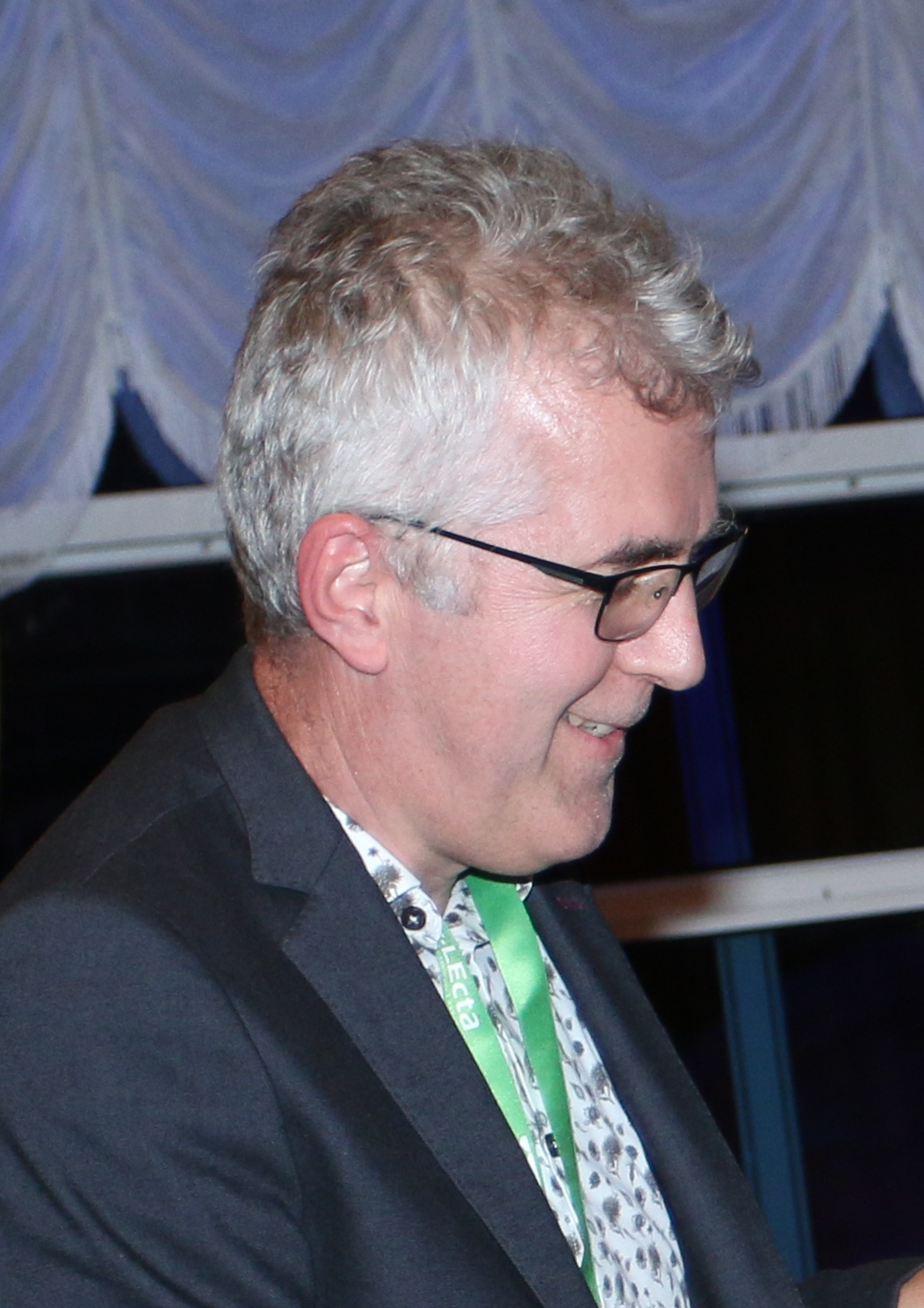
Marco Fraaije, accepting the BIOCAT science award in 2018.

Marco Wilhelmus Fraaije (born 7 December 1968) is a Dutch scientist whose research concerns enzymology of redox enzymes, enzyme discovery & engineering and biocatalysis at the Groningen Biomolecular Sciences and Biotechnology Institute (GBB) at the University of Groningen.

== Education ==
Marco Fraaije graduated in 1993 with a Master of Science degree in Molecular Sciences at Wageningen University. Subsequently, he became a doctoral student at Wageningen University under supervision of Willem van Berkel focusing on the mechanism and structure of flavoenzymes and was awarded his PhD in biochemistry in 1998. Following his PhD, he worked as a postdoctoral researcher as EMBO fellow in the protein crystallography research group at the University of Pavia. In 1999, he was made assistant professor at GBB at the University of Groningen, and in 2007 he was appointed as associate professor. In 2012, he was made full professor in molecular enzymology.

== Research ==
Fraaije is active in the fields of enzyme engineering and biocatalysis. His research mainly deals with discovery, engineering and exploration of novel oxidative enzymes, with special emphasis on flavin-containing enzymes. Besides exploring the biocatalytic potential of these biocatalysts, he also aims at elucidating the molecular functioning of oxidative flavoenzymes. He also has interest in evolutionary aspects of enzymology and in line with this he is board member of the geological museum Oertijdmuseum in Boxtel.

Marco Fraaije has a significant number of publications and four patents. He has coordinated EU-funded projects including OXYGREEN (2008-2013), ROBOX (2015-2019), and OXYTRAIN (2017-2020).

== Awards ==
In 2018, Fraaije received the BIOCAT science award from the Biocat Society at the International Congress on Biocatalysis for his scientific achievement in the field of biocatalysis. Other research prizes include the Unilever research prize, 1993; EMBO long-term fellowship, 1998; and the VICI-NWO research grant, 2016.

In 2005, he became a member of the Biomolecular Chemistry division of the Netherlands Organization for Scientific Research and currently chairs the Applied Biocatalysis division of the Dutch Biotechnology Society.

== Selected publications ==
- Aalbers FS, Fraaije MW (2017) Coupled reactions by coupled enzymes: alcohol to lactone cascade with alcohol dehydrogenase-cyclohexanone monooxygenase fusions. Appl Microbiol Biotechnol. 101, 7557-7565.
- Beyer N, Kulig JK, Bartsch A, Hayes MA, Janssen DB, Fraaije MW (2017) P450BM3 fused to phosphite dehydrogenase allows phosphite-driven selective oxidations. Appl Microbiol Biotechnol. 101, 2319-2331.
- Romero E, Castellanos JR, Mattevi A, Fraaije MW (2016) Characterization and crystal structure of a robust cyclohexanone monooxygenase. Angew Chem Int Ed Engl. 55, 15852-15855. Selected as Biocatalysis Hot Paper.
- Brondani PB, Dudek HM, Martinoli C, Mattevi A, Fraaije MW (2014) Finding the switch: turning a Baeyer-Villiger monooxygenase into a NADPH oxidase. J. Am. Chem. Soc. 136, 16966-16969
