= Dairy Barn =

Drive-through grocery store in New York

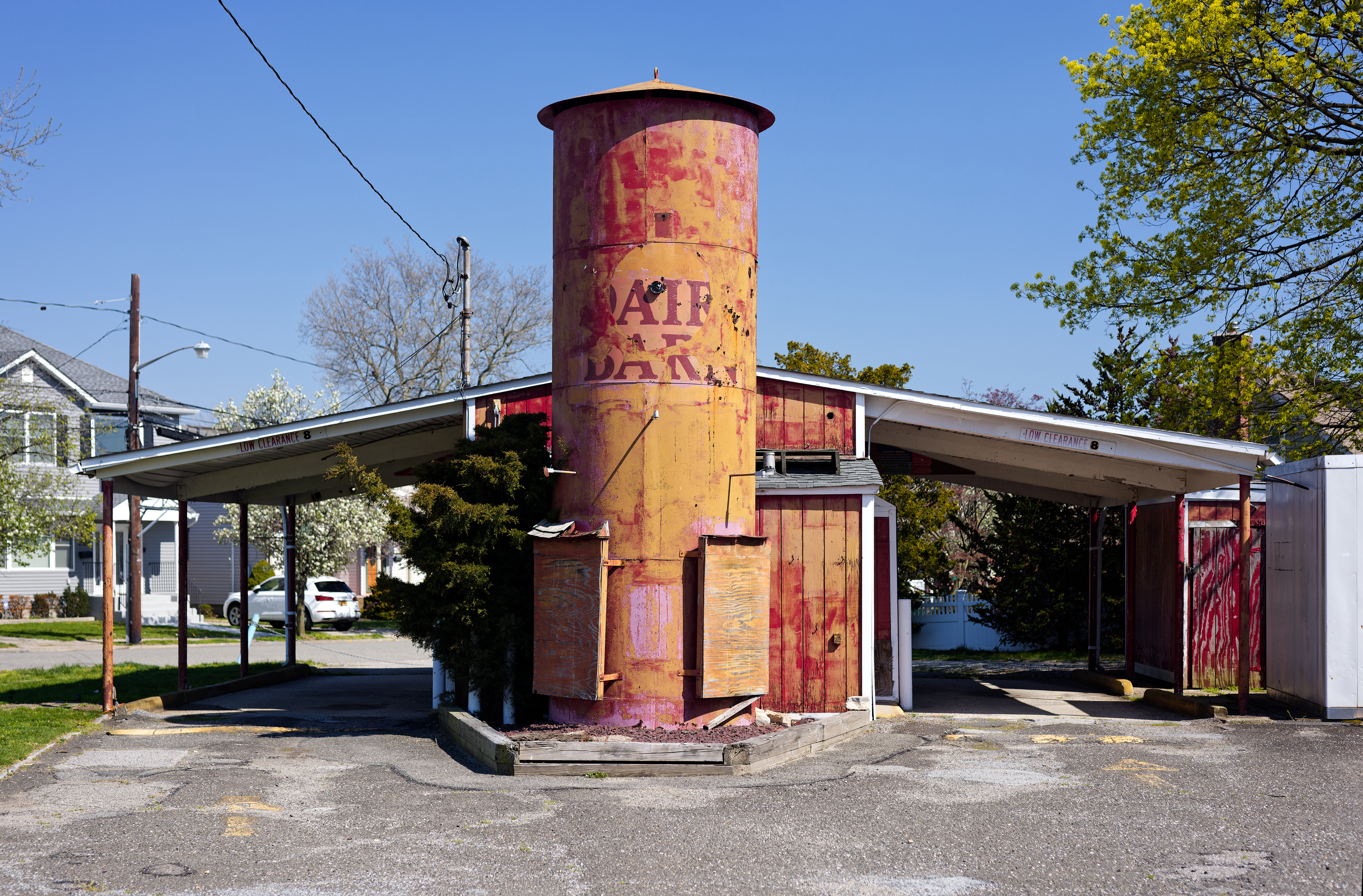
Former Dairy Barn in New Hyde Park

Dairy Barn was a chain of regional convenience stores located on Long Island, New York, with headquarters at the Oak Tree Farm Dairy in Elwood, New York. The stores were distinguished by their two canopied drive-through sections, a red barn appearance, and a little red silo.

The peak number of operating Dairy Barn stores was approximately 70. Acting as a distributor for Oak Tree, the stores carried Oak Tree brand milk and iced tea. Under its own label, it sold butter, cream, eggs, bacon, sausage, ice cream, orange juice, and even water.

Some original Dairy Barn locations remain open as retail establishments retaining the red barn theme.

== History ==
In 1941 Edgar Cosman, a Swiss textile manufacturer with business interests in the United States, purchased the Oak Tree Farm Dairy in Elwood on Long Island. His son, Dieter Cosman, was tasked with running it. Under Cosman, the dairy's finances improved. During the 1950s, it stopped housing cows and began processing milk from upstate New York.

Seeing the decline in its milk delivery business, Cosman expanded the dairy's wholesale milk business into a chain of retail, drive-through convenience stores named Dairy Barn in 1961. The stores acted as distributors for Oak Tree's products, operating as a separate company and both owned by the Cosman family.

The first store was on Larkfield Road in East Northport. A store opened in Farmingdale in May 1961. There were 45 stores by 1967. A store opened in St. James in April 1971. By 1972, there were 54 stores generating $20 million per year. A 55th store was opened in Lake Ronkonkoma that year. The stores implemented a recycling program in 1974 to dispose of its plastic milk containers. Three years later, the 58-store chain had recycled 461,000 pounds of plastic.

By the early 1990s, Oak Tree had become the only dairy on Long Island and was trucking 18,000 gallons of milk each day from farms near Syracuse to the company's plant. In 1997, a fire destroyed the dairy. It was rebuilt the following year. By 1998, there were 54 Dairy Barn stores. By 2005, the number had dropped to 51.

In 2009, the company began downsizing and selling off its stores. By May 2010, locations in Smithtown, St. James, Patchogue, Farmingville, Center Moriches, Shirley, and Selden had been sold to a single buyer. In total, 38 of the remaining Dairy Barn properties were sold to Long Island City-based Simi Enterprises. The locations were rebranded as simply The Barn. The Cosman family closed the Oak Tree farm and sold the land to developers in 2012. By April 2012, there were still 19 Dairy Barn locations and 25 The Barn stores. The Barn had 22 locations in 2020 and saw success during the COVID-19 pandemic.

In 2021, 28 stores were leased to Greek From Greece. This agreement ended the following year. By 2022, The Barn had one location in Huntington and one in St. James. By 2023, multiple independent operators were running former Dairy Barn locations under The Barn and other names. In 2024, 10 locations were sold to Ready Coffee.
