= Wageningen Social & Economic Research =

Research institute in the Netherlands

Coordinates: 52.0881°N 4.3018°E

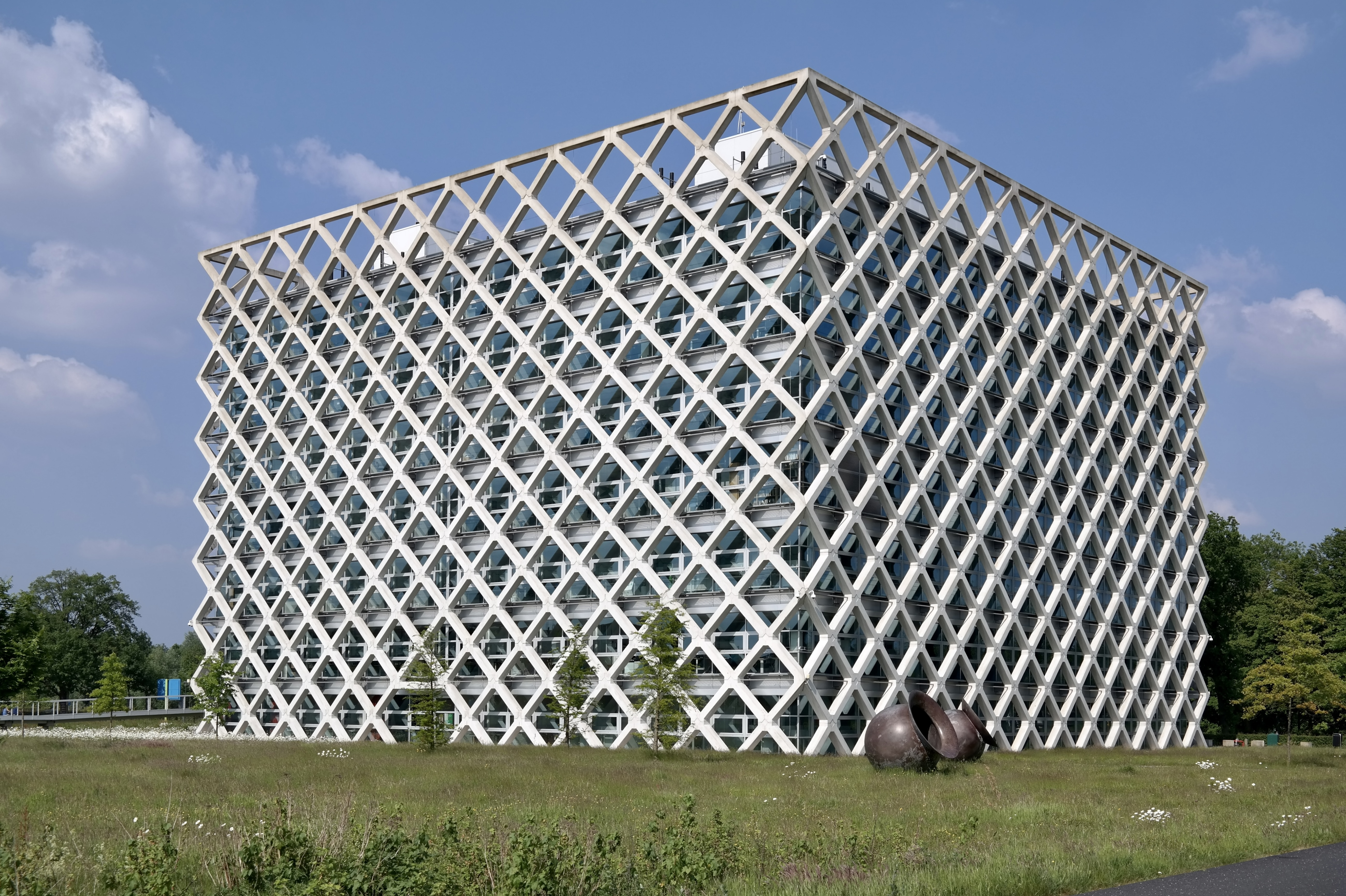
Atlas building on WUR campus, seat of WSER's main office since 2018

Wageningen Social & Economic Research (WSER) is one of the research institutes of Wageningen University & Research (WUR). Former names of the institute are Landbouw-Economisch Instituut (LEI) ("Agricultural Economics Institute", 1930s–2016) and Wageningen Economic Research (abbreviated WEcR, 2016–2024). In 2025, the Wageningen Centre for Development Innovation (founded as the International Agricultural Centre, IAC, 1951–2009) merged with WEcR to become the present WSER.

== Activities ==
Within the Netherlands and Belgium, WSER is a leading institute for social-economic research in the fields of agriculture, horticulture and fisheries, the management of rural areas, the agricultural sector and the production and consumption of food. Through this research, WSER provides support for the decisions that governments and businesses need to make in the fields of competitiveness, the management of production chains, spatial planning, environmental protection, natural resources, the European Common Agricultural Policy and global trading.

WSER also performs legal and service-related tasks for the Ministry of Agriculture, Fisheries, Food Security and Nature (LVVN). The Agricultural Economic Report and other annual reports present an impression of the financial and economic position of companies and sectors.

== History ==
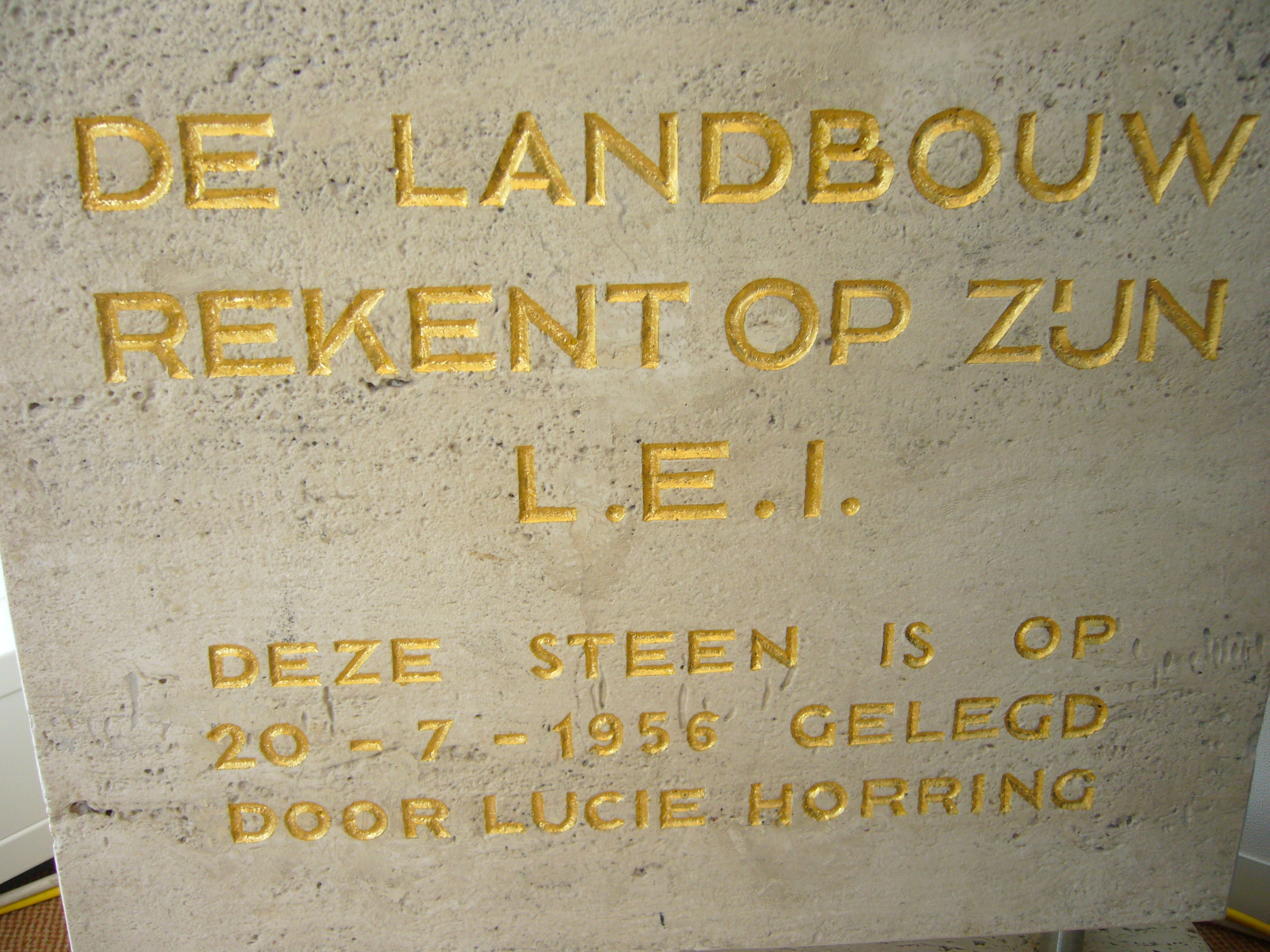
Founding stone at the Conradkade office. It reads: "Agriculture counts on its LEI".

LEI – originally the Landbouw-Economisch Instituut (Agricultural Economics Institute) – was established in the late 1930s by agricultural organisations. In the 1970s it became part of the Dutch ministry of Agriculture and in the 1990s it was privatised.It became part of Wageningen University and Research Centre, within which it combined with the Department of Social Sciences to form the Social Sciences Group. It was renamed in 2016 to "Wageningen Economic Research" (abbreviated "WEcR", to differentiate it from Wageningen Environmental Research, WENR). On 1 January 2025, WEcR merged with Wageningen Centre for Development Innovation to form Wageningen Social & Economic Research (WSER).

Wageningen Centre for Development Innovation began its journey in 1951 as the International Agricultural Centre (IAC)—a pioneering initiative of the Dutch Ministry of Agriculture (LNV), created to support countries undergoing rapid development. Over the decades, IAC evolved through integration into Wageningen UR in 2001, becoming part of Wageningen International, and eventually launching as a separate business unit, Centre for Development Innovation, in 2009. With a focus on capacity strengthening, social learning, and complex system innovation, WCDI has grown into a key knowledge partner in global sustainable development. On 1 January 2025, WCDI merged with WEcR to form Wageningen Social & Economic Research (WSER).

== See also ==
- Wageningen Environmental Research (WENR)
- Wageningen Food Safety Research (WFSR)
- Wageningen Marine Research (WMR)
