= Wageningen University & Research =

Agricultural university in Wageningen, Netherlands

- Wageningen University & Research
- Motto in English: To explore the potential of nature to improve the quality of life
- Type: Public university
- Established: 1876 as an agricultural college. Recognized in 1918 as a public university
- Affiliations: Euroleague for Life Sciences, EUA, 4TU
- Rector: Carolien Kroeze
- Executive Board President: Sjoukje Heimovaara
- Total staff: 3,794 (3,588 FTE)
- Students: 13,564 (2023–2024)
- Undergraduates: 5,773 (2023–2024)
- Postgraduates: 7,284 (2023–2024)
- Doctoral students: 2,440 (2023–2024)
- Other students: 507 (2023–2024)
- Location: Wageningen, Netherlands; 51°58′01.52″N 5°39′30.97″E
- Colours: Green, light blue and soil
- Mascot: WUR Wolf
- Website: www.wur.nl/en.htm

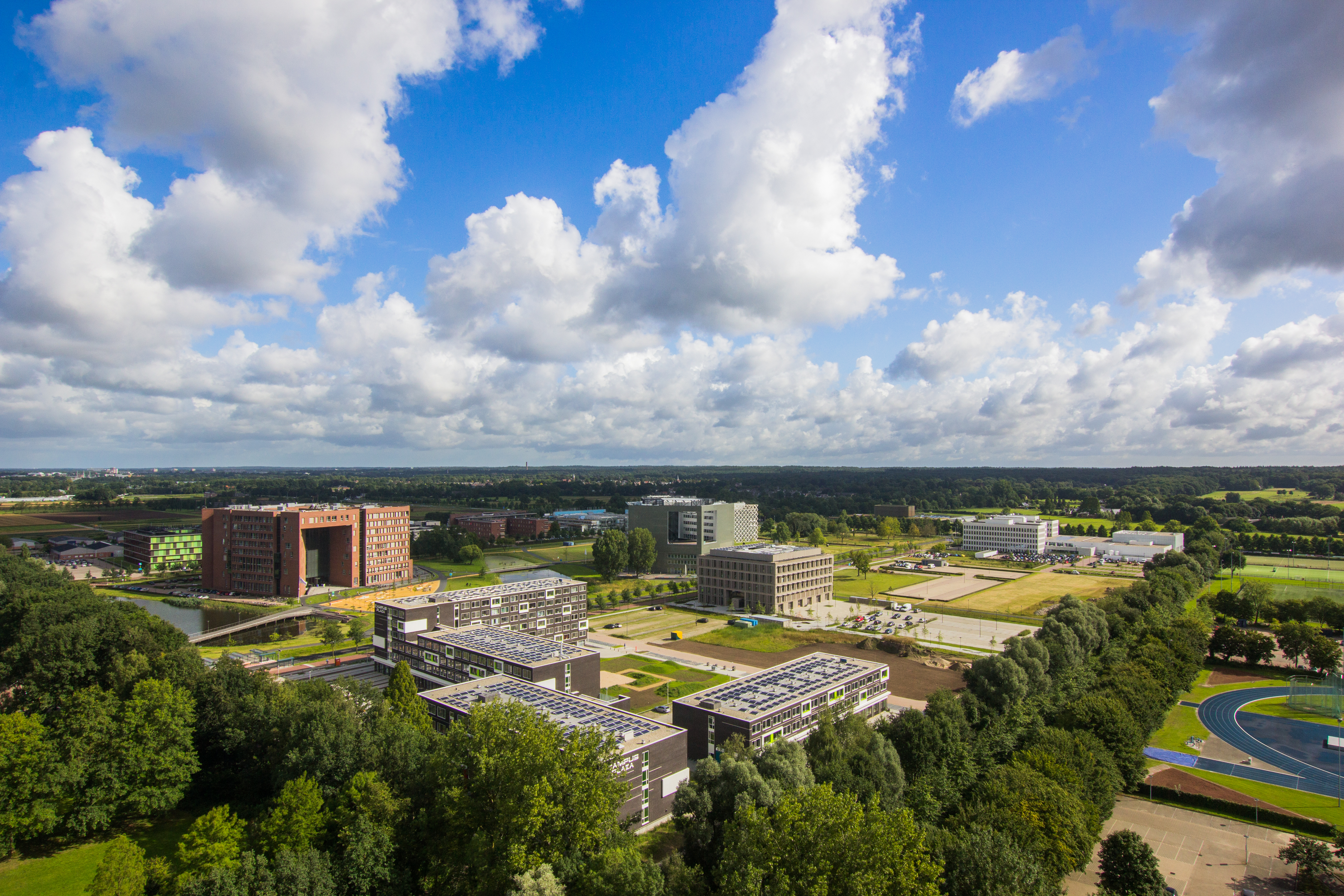
Panorama of the campus of Wageningen University & Research

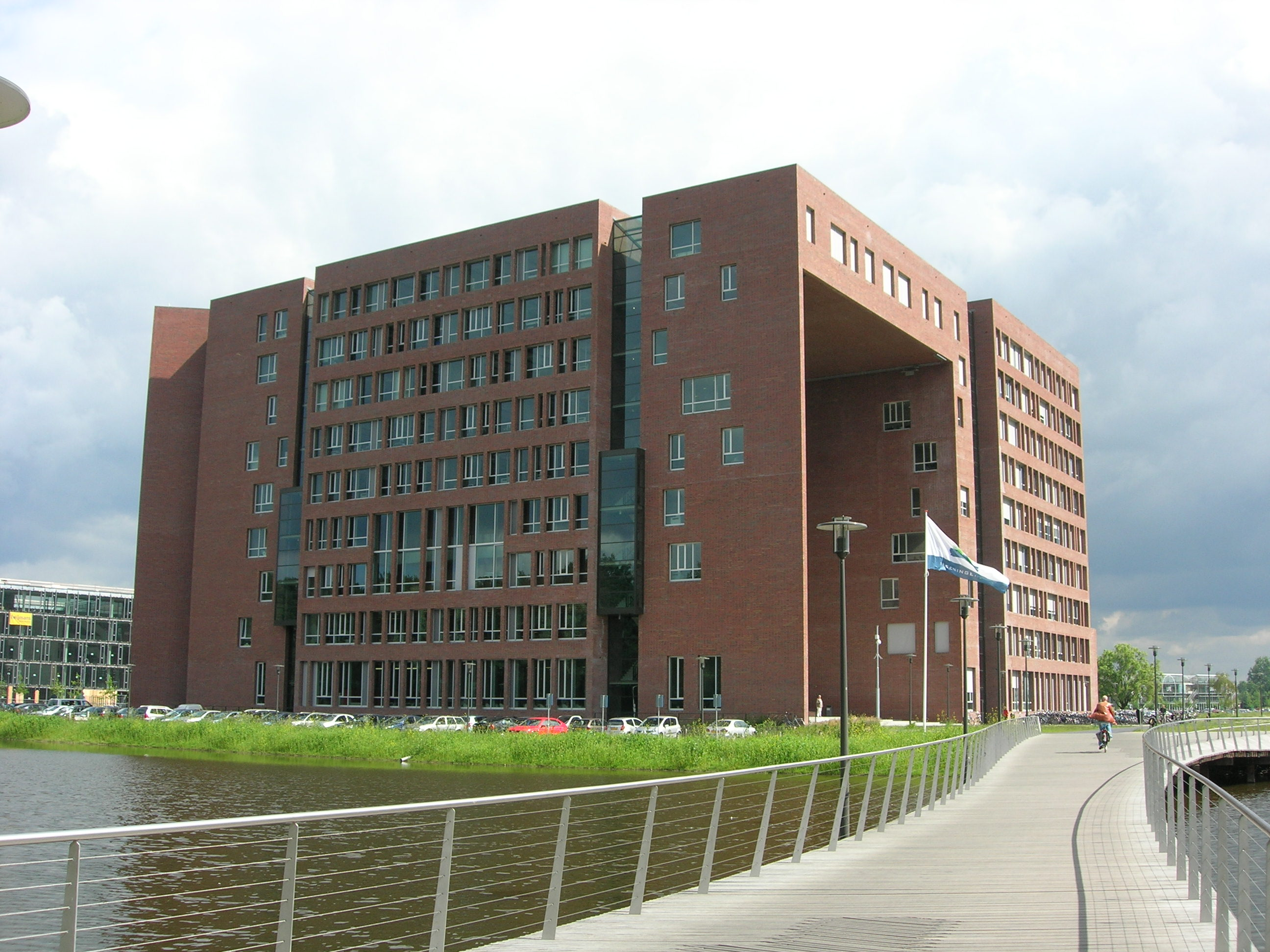
Forum building. Library and one of the education hubs.

Wageningen University & Research (also known as WUR) is an organization composed of a public technical research university and a non-profit research institute located in Wageningen, Netherlands, specializing in life sciences with a focus on agriculture, technical and engineering subjects. It is a globally important center for life sciences and agricultural research. It is located in a region of the Netherlands known as the Food Valley.

Wageningen University and Research consists of two organizations: Wageningen University and Wageningen Research Foundation. Wageningen Research Foundation includes, among others, the former agricultural research institutes of the Dutch Ministry of Agriculture. Wageningen University is a research university which grants degrees at the BSc, MSc and PhD level in life and social sciences. It focuses its research on scientific, societal and technological problems in the field of life sciences and natural resources. It is widely known for its agriculture, forestry, and environmental studies programs. The university has about 12,000 students from over 100 countries. It is a member of the Euroleague for Life Sciences (ELLS) university network.

== History ==
In 1876 the Rijkslandbouwschool (National Agricultural College) was established in Wageningen. Developing to training at a higher educational level in 1896 it changed its name to the Hoogere Land- en Boschbouwschool (Agricultural and Forestry College) and in 1904 to Rijks Hoogere Land-, Tuin- en Boschbouwschool (National Agricultural, Horticulture and Forestry College).

In 1918 the school became an academic instruction by law (Academic Education Act). The name changed to Rijks Landbouw Hoogeschool (National Agricultural College), which is currently celebrated as its dies natalis (foundation date) at 9 March 1918.

In 1986 the research oriented "hogescholen" (comparable to research and scientific oriented institute of technology or business schools) were renamed University in a modification of the Academic Education Act. The new name became Landbouwuniversiteit Wageningen (LUW) (Wageningen Agricultural University (WAU)).

Over the years the research and teaching branched out into life sciences in general. In 1997, when the agricultural research institutes (Dienst Landbouwkundig Onderzoek / Service of agricultural research) merged with the university, the new holding company was rebranded as Wageningen UR (Wageningen University and Research Centre); with the university being renamed Wageningen University. Under Dutch laws the university and the institutes had to remain separate legal entities.

In 2006, the university of applied sciences Van Hall Larenstein became part of Wageningen UR. The intention was to create better collaboration between applied teaching and research at Van Hall and the academic research at Wageningen University. This would also support students to continue with an academic program upon completing their applied degree. However, due to differences in organizational culture and incompatibility of procedures, the collaboration remained problematic. In 2012 it was decided that Van Hall Larenstein would leave Wageningen UR and continue as an independent school once more. In the spring of 2015 the separation was marked by the move of the final Wageningen-based Van Hall Larenstein studies back to Velp.

In 2009 it was decided that the university would use the English brand in its communication. University research could be presented under the name of either the university: Wageningen University (WU), or under of the name Wageningen University and Research (WUR). On 6 September 2016 Wageningen University and the research institutes became one joint brand: Wageningen University & Research (WUR).

On 9 March 2018 Wageningen University celebrated her 100 years anniversary. In 2018 many events and festivities around the campus and in the city of Wageningen were organised, and the university was presented with a carillon installed at the main campus.

== Academic profile ==
Wageningen University was the first Dutch university or school that was allowed to use the European Credit Transfer and Accumulation System (ECTS) label. This label is awarded by the European Commission and guarantees the quality of the study program. The university consequently applies this system, thus promoting the mobility of students within Europe and preventing study delay.

=== BSc programs ===
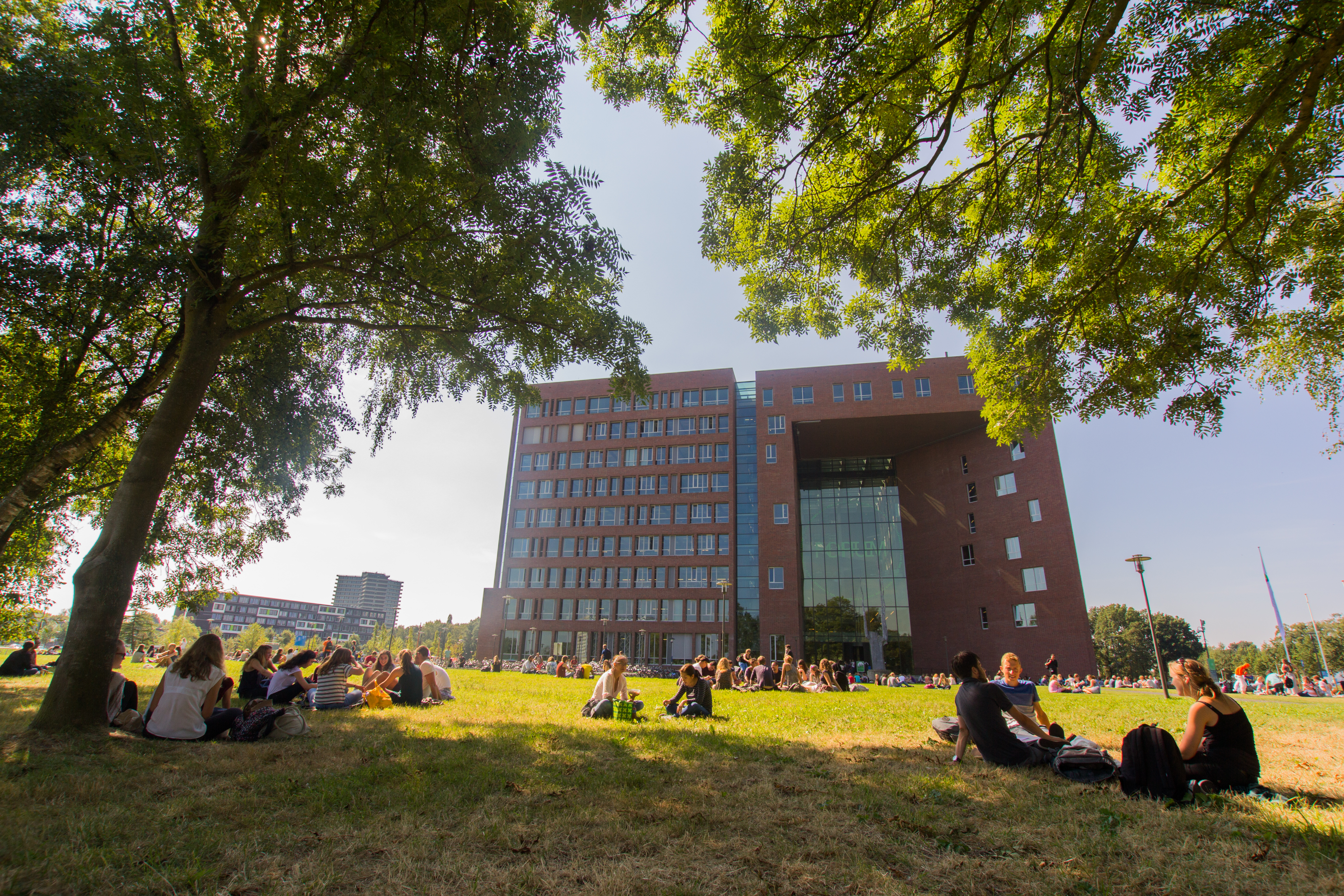
Forum, one of the eye-catchers on the Wageningen Campus

The university offers 19 BSc programs (2018–2019). For some BSc programs, the language of instruction is English. Other programs teach in both Dutch and English. The programs start each year in September, last three years, and consist of 180 ECTS credits. The programs are in the field of economy and society, health, life sciences and technology, nature and environment, animals and plants.

=== MSc programs ===
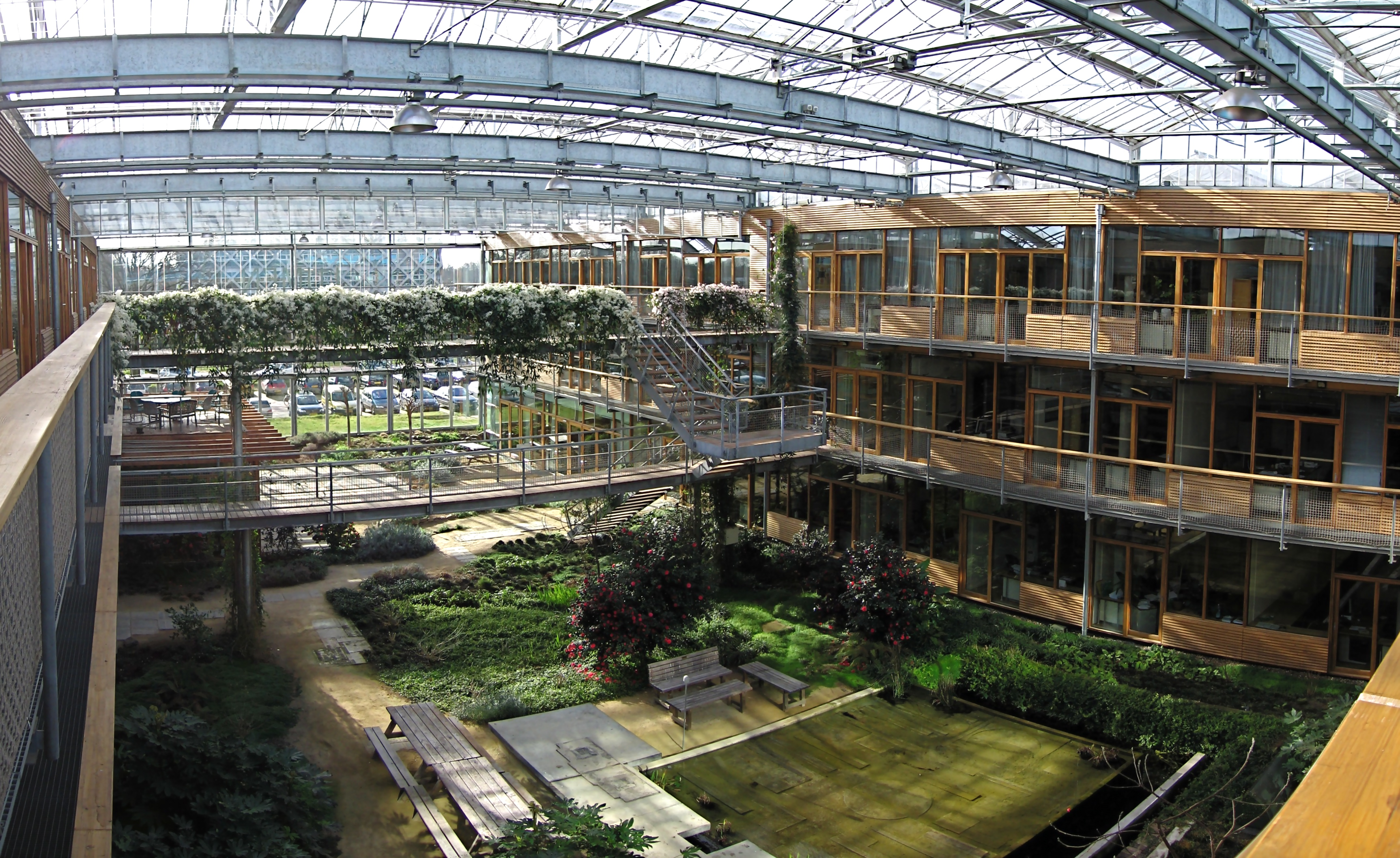
Panorama of the greenhouse of the Lumen building

Wageningen University offers 36 different MSc programs (2017–2018) and two online masters programs. Although formally the same MSc program, from 2022 onwards the Master of Management Economic and Consumer studies program was offered as 5 independent MSc tracks (Sustainable Business Innovations, Sustainable Supply Chain Analytics, Consumer Studies, Economics of Sustainability, Governance of Sustainability Transformations). The language of instruction for all Master's programs is English. The programs start each year in September, they last two years, and consist of 120 ECTS credits. Most programs offer various specializations and possibilities for majors, as well as full or partial premaster tracks for candidates not fulfilling all entry requirements.

=== PhD program ===
The regular PhD program is a four-year program during which PhD candidates are appointed as junior researcher in the universities, building up unemployment and retirement benefits. Such fully paid PhD candidates on a four-year contract can be asked to perform teaching tasks for a maximum of 10% of their time as part of their appointment. Candidates supported by specific grants (usually bestowed upon the candidate by an (international) organisation), or doing PhD next to a regular job can also enrol. In these cases a tailored timeline will be agreed upon. The program consists of a research component (conducting research under supervision and writing a thesis) and a smaller education component (30 ECTS or half a year of course load with conference presentations, and some management and teaching tasks can be listed as learning activity).

== Research institutes ==
The following research institutes are part of Wageningen Research:

- Wageningen Environmental Research (WENR), formerly Alterra
- Wageningen Social & Economic Research (WSER), formerly Landbouw-Economisch Instituut (LEI), later Wageningen Economic Research (WEcR). Wageningen Centre for Development Innovation, formerly Centre for Development Innovation, merged with WEcR to form WSER in 2025.
- Wageningen Bioveterinary Research (WBVR), formerly Central Veterinary Institute
- Wageningen Food & Biobased Research (WFBR), formerly Food & Biobased Research
- Wageningen Livestock Research (WLR)
- Wageningen Marine Research (WMR), formerly IMARES
- Wageningen Plant Research (WPR), formerly Plant Research International
- Dairy Campus
- Wageningen Food Safety Research (WFSR), formerly RIKILT

== Controversy ==
Wageningen University and Research has received negative exposure due to claims of partiality in research. One case regards a research concerning bee colony collapse disorder. Research conducted on the topic has caused controversy due to funding received for the research from the German pesticide producer Bayer, the world's biggest producer of neonicotinoid insecticides, a suspect factor for the colony collapse disorder.

In 2018 the Dutch magazine OneWorld went to court in an attempt to demand access to contracts between WUR and Bayer, Syngenta and Monsanto, but OneWorld ultimately lost the court case.

== Rankings ==
=== International rankings ===
University rankings

Global – Overall
- ARWU World: 151–200 (2024)
- CWUR World: 178 (2022–23)
- CWTS World: 64 (2022)
- QS World: =153 (2026)
- THE World: =67 (2025)
- USNWR Global: =113 (2025)

Global – Life sciences and medicine
- ARWU Life sciences: 1 (2022)
- QS Agriculture and Forestry: 1 (2022)
- QS Life Sciences & Medicine: =43 (2022)
- THE Life Sciences: =19 (2022)

Global – Science and engineering
- THE Engineering: 97 (2022)

In the field of life sciences, agricultural and environmental science, the university is considered world-class. According to the Times Higher Education World University Rankings it is the best university in the Netherlands and No. 1 worldwide, in agriculture and forestry for 2017 on the QS World University Rankings charts.

- In the 2019 U.S. News & World Report Ranking Wageningen University & Research is ranked first in agricultural sciences, plant and animal sciences, and environment/ecology.
- In the 2017/2018 National Taiwan Ranking Wageningen University is ranked first in the field of agriculture.
- In the 2017/2018 National Taiwan Ranking Wageningen University is ranked first in the field of Environment & Ecology.
- In the 2016 Shanghai Ranking Wageningen University was ranked in the bracket 101–150th best universities in the world overall and 36th best in the life and agriculture sciences.
- In the 2017 Times Higher Education World University Rankings Wageningen University was ranked 25th overall in the world and 16th in life sciences.
- In the Academic Ranking of World Universities 2017 Wageningen University & Research is ranked first in the field of Food Science & Technology.
- In the 2016/2017 QS World University Rankings, Wageningen University was ranked 119th overall in the world, first in the field of agriculture and forestry, fourth in environmental science, 13th in development studies, and 83rd in life sciences and medicine.

=== National rankings ===
- The Dutch 'Keuzegids' ranking compares Dutch universities based on reviews by their own students. In 2024 Wageningen University is ranked as the best university in the Netherlands in full-time education for the 20th time in a row.
- In 2015 Wageningen University was awarded as the most sustainable Dutch University by Morgen, for the third time in a row.

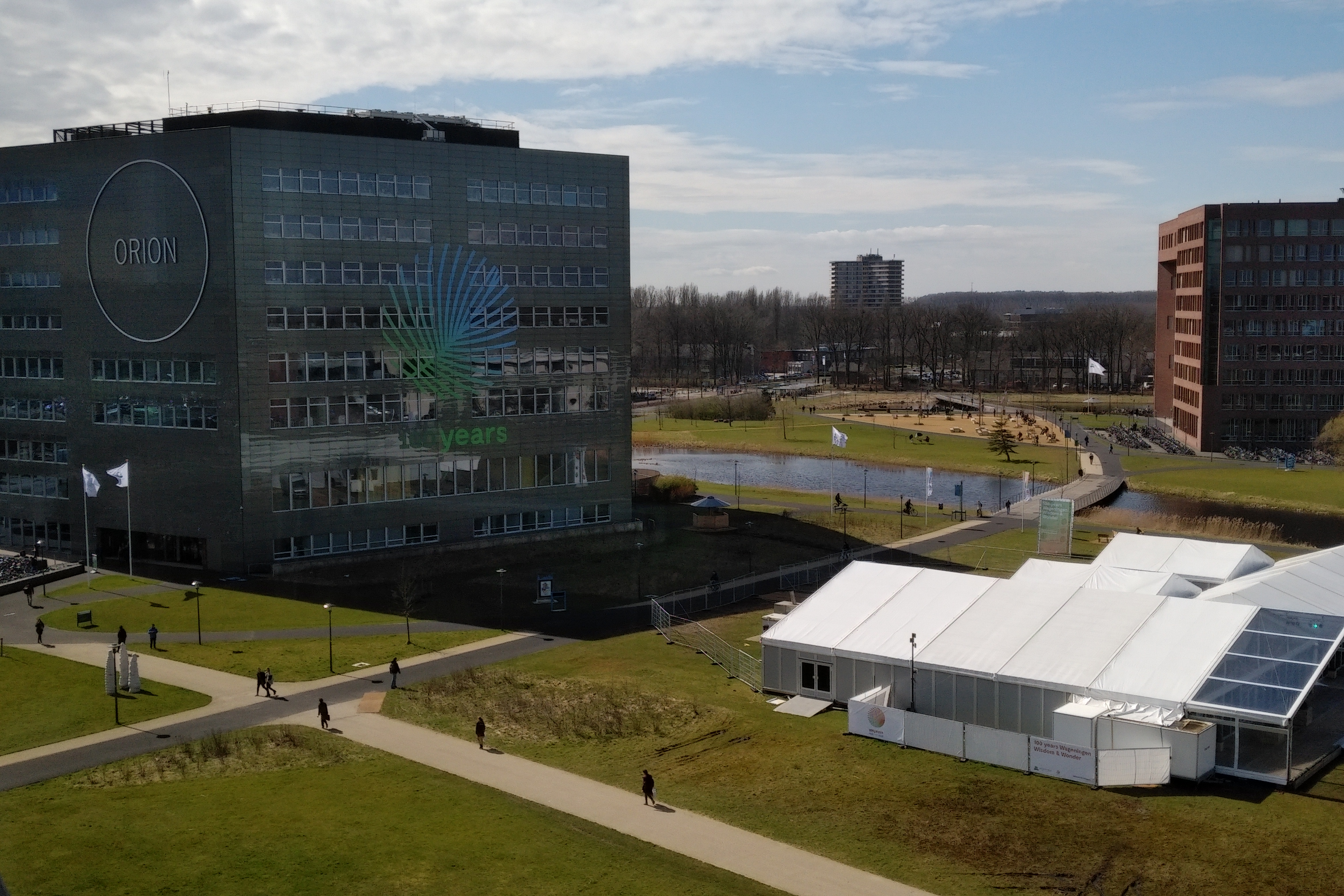
100 years WUR on the campus

== Student activities and associations ==
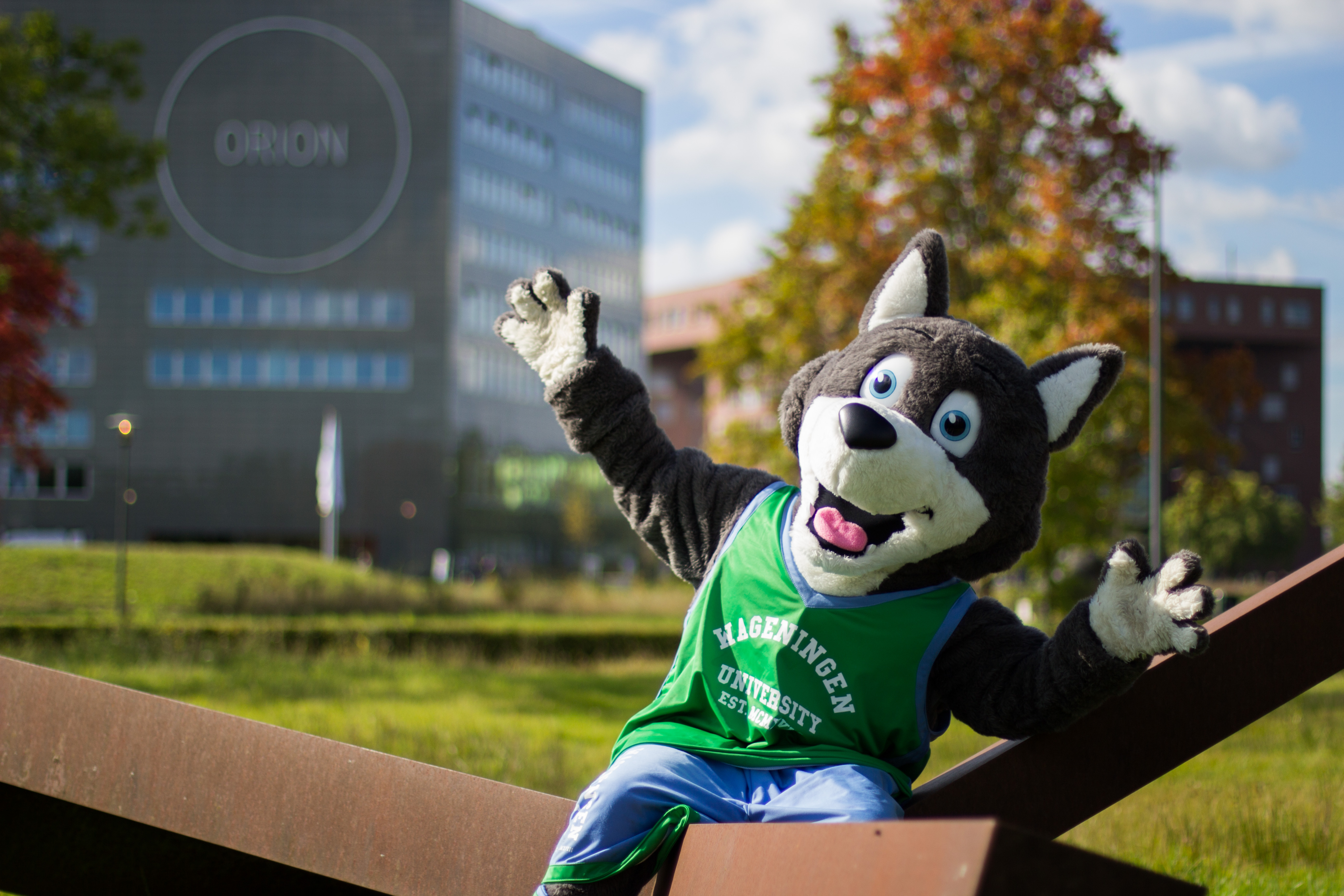
The mascot of the university, the WURwolf

=== Study associations ===
- M.S.A. Minoa is the study association for students of the Bachelor Marine Sciences. It is named after an old civilisation on Crete, which was a sea based empire. Minoa is the newest study association at the WUR.
- Artemis is the study association for students of the master Geo-information Science. Established in 2023, it is one of the newest study associations.
- Pyrus is the study association for Bsc Soil, Water, Atmosphere and Msc Earth and Environment students. The study association was established in 1989 after the study programme changed its name to Soil, Water, Atmosphere.
- M.S.V. Alchimica is the study association for students Molecular Life Sciences. Since 1970 it has been organising different activities for its members.
- CODON is the study Association for all Biotechnology (BBT and MBT), Bioinformatics (MBF) and Biobased Sciences (MBS) students. Established by the first students of Bioprocestechnologie on 16 September 1991. At that time the association carried the name "BiPS" which was later changed to CODON.
- Nitocra is the study association for students of International Land and Water management.
- Semper Florens is the study association for students of the bachelor Plant Sciences (BPS), the master Plant Sciences (MPS), the master Plant Biotechnology (MPB) and the master Organic Agriculture (MOA).
- HeerenXVII is the study association for students of following the bachelor 'Agrotechnologie' or the masters ' Biosystems Engineering'.
- Nicolas Appert is the study association of the students for Food Technology including all masters programmes. It is named after the famous professor Nicolas Appert who invented the technique of 'canning'.
- Mercurius is the social science association for students at the WUR following either the bachelor 'management and consumer studies', 'economics and governance' or the master 'Management, Economics and Consumer studies'.
- Licere is the study association of the students for MTO Tourism, Leisure and Environment masters programme.
- Ipso Facto is the study association for students of the bachelor 'Internationale Ontwikkelingsstudies' and 'Communicatie & Life Sciences' or the masters 'International Development' and 'Development and Rural Innovation'.

=== Student associations ===
- Brabants Studenten Gilde is the student association for Brabantian students.
- Wageningsk Studinte Selskip foar Fryske Stúdzje is the student association for Frysian students.
- WSG Paragon is the esport, gaming and board gaming student association of Wageningen.

== Notable alumni and staff ==
- Reinier van den Berg
- Dirk Bezemer (born 1971), economist
- Jan Bieleman
- Jan Just Bos
- Gerrit Braks
- Staf Depla
- Jeroen Dijsselbloem
- Willem Hilbrand van Dobben
- Heather M. Ferguson
- Edith Feskens
- Marco Fraaije
- Louise Fresco
- Volkert van der Graaf, murderer of Pim Fortuyn
- Wilbert Hetterscheid
- Gerrit Hiemstra
- J. G. ten Houten, extraordinarius (Extraordinary Professor) from 1971 to 1976
- Piet de Jong
- Martijn Katan
- Roosmarijn Knol
- Ruud Koopmans
- Ferdinand Anton Langguth Oliviera
- Joan Leemhuis-Stout
- Helga van Leur
- Tinka Murk
- F. H. van Naerssen
- George Tawia Odamtten
- Jan Odink
- Qu Dongyu, Director-General of the Food and Agriculture Organization (FAO) of the United Nations
- Theo Quené
- Rudy Rabbinge
- Abbie Richards
- Ramsewak Shankar
- Bernard Slicher van Bath
- Willie Smits
- Harry Snelders
- Katja Staartjes, first Dutch woman on Mount Everest
- Jan-Benedict Steenkamp
- Paul Struik
- Jan Valckenier Suringar
- Rob Urgert
- Cees Veerman
- Louise Vet
- Annemiek van Vleuten
- Anne Vondeling
- Joris Voorhoeve
- Willem de Vos (academic)
- Marijke Vos
- Henk Vredeling
- Simon Vroemen
- Karel Vuursteen, CEO of Heineken
- Clive West
- Onno Wijnands
- Hendrik de Wit
- Grietje Zeeman

== See also ==
- Centre for Genetic Resources, the Netherlands
- List of agricultural universities and colleges
- Open access in the Netherlands
- World Soil Museum
