= Timeline of Eindhoven =

The following is a timeline of the history of the municipality of Eindhoven, Netherlands.

== Prior to 20th century ==
- 1232 - Town rights bestowed by Henry I, Duke of Brabant.
- 1420 - Castle built.
- 1486 - 19 March: 1486 Eindhoven fire.
- 1554 - Fire.
- 1583 - Siege of Eindhoven (1583).
- 1629 - Eindhoven becomes part of the Netherlands.
- 1771 - Jewish cemetery, Eindhoven established.
- 1791 - Population: 1,785.
- 1815 - Population: 2,310.
- 1846 - Eindhoven Canal dug.
- 1866
  - Eindhoven railway station opens.
  - Synagogue built.
- 1867 - Saint Catherine Church, Eindhoven rebuilt.
- 1869 - Town Hall built.
- 1880 - St. Peter's Church, Eindhoven built.
- 1891 - Philips in business.
- 1897 - Eindhoven-Reusel tram line begins operating.
- 1898 - St. Augustine's Church, Eindhoven built.
- 1900 - Population: 4,730.

== 20th century ==
- 1904 - Wilhelminaplein (Eindhoven) (square) laid out.
- 1909
  - FC Eindhoven (football club) formed.
  - Kantoorgebouw Coöperatieve Centrale Boerenleenbank built on Dommelstraat.
- 1910 - Philips Stadion (stadium) opens.
- 1911 - Eindhovens Dagblad (newspaper) begins publication.
- 1913 - PSV Eindhoven (football club) formed.
- 1920
  - Gestel, Stratum, Strijp, Tongelre, and Woensel become part of the municipality of Eindhoven.
  - Population: 47,946.
- 1921 - Lichttoren (Eindhoven) built.
- 1929 - PSV Eindhoven wins its first Dutch football championship.
- 1931 - Witte Dame built.
- 1932
  - Welschap Airfield begins operating.
  - DAF Trucks in business.
- 1935 - Population: 103,030.
- 1936 - Van Abbemuseum opens.
- 1937 - Museum Kempenland opens.
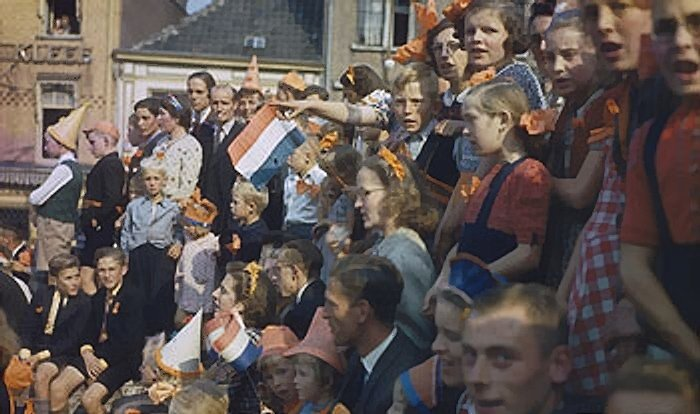
  Liberation of Eindhoven, 20 September 1944
- 1939 - Witte Dorp neighborhood developed.
- 1942 - December: Aerial bombing by Allied forces.
- 1943 - September: Subcamp of the Herzogenbusch concentration camp established by the German occupiers.
- 1944
  - June: Subcamp of the Herzogenbusch concentration camp dissolved.
  - September: City besieged by Allied forces.
- 1945 - Het Vrije Volk newspaper begins publication.
- 1947 - Design Academy Eindhoven established.
- 1954 - FC Eindhoven wins its first Dutch football championship.
- 1955 - Population: 154,604.
- 1956
  - Eindhoven railway station rebuilt.
  - Eindhoven University of Technology established.
- 1959
  - Eindhoven Marathon begins.
  - Herman Witte becomes mayor.
- 1964
  - Parktheater Eindhoven opens.
  - Philips Nederland built.
- 1966 - The futuristic Evoluon science museum was built.
- 1967 - City Hall rebuilt.
- 1969 - Student centre De Bunker (Eindhoven) built.
- 1970 - De Bijenkorf department store built.
- 1971 - Effenaar youth centre established.
- 1976 - Administrative entity for the Eindhoven agglomeration created.
- 1979 - Gilles Borrie becomes mayor.
- 1980 - Het Apollohuis cultural venue established.
- 1982 - Open-air Eindhoven Museum and Streekarchief regio Eindhoven (regional archive) established.
- 1984 - Eindhoven Airport terminal built.
- 1985 - May: Catholic pope visits city.
- 1992
  - Muziekgebouw Frits Philips (concert hall) opens.
  - Rein Welschen becomes mayor.
- 1993 - Holland Casino branch in business.
- 1996 - 15 July: 1996 Belgian Air Force Hercules accident occurs at Eindhoven Airport.
- 1997
  - Philips headquarters relocated to Amsterdam.
  - Jan Louwers Stadion (stadium) in use.
- 1999 - De Regent hi-rise built.
- 2000
  - UEFA Euro 2000 football contest held.
  - Population: 203,433.

== 21st century ==
- 2001 - City joins regional BrabantStad group.
- 2002
  - Leefbaar Eindhoven political party active.
  - Dutch Design Week begins.
  - Avant-Garde van Groeninge restaurant in business.
- 2003
  - Regionaal Historisch Centrum Eindhoven active.
  - Kennedytoren hi-rise built.
- 2004 - Inkijkmuseum opens.
- 2006
  - Glow Festival Eindhoven begins.
  - De Admirant, Porthos, and Vesteda Toren hi-rises built.
- 2008
  - De Parade (Eindhoven) built.
  - Rob van Gijzel becomes mayor.
  - Automotive Pole Position Eindhoven event held.
- 2009 - Strijp R redevelopment begins (approximate date).
- 2010
  - Admirant shopping centre's "Blob" building constructed.
  - Piet Hein Eek studio in business.
- 2012 - Stadionkwartier (Eindhoven) built.
- 2014 - 19 March: Dutch municipal elections, 2014 held.
- 2015 - Population: 223,220 city; 753,426 metro region.

== See also ==
- Eindhoven history
- History of Eindhoven
- List of mayors of Eindhoven
- List of rijksmonuments in Eindhoven
- Timelines of other municipalities in the Netherlands: Amsterdam, Breda, Delft, Groningen, Haarlem, The Hague, 's-Hertogenbosch, Leiden, Maastricht, Nijmegen, Rotterdam, Utrecht

== Bibliography ==
in Dutch

- F. N. Smits, Beknopte geschiedenis van Eindhoven (in Dutch) 1887-1888
- L. G. A. Houben (1890), Geschiedenis van Eindhoven (in Dutch)
- Henri Zondervan [in Dutch], ed. (1917), "Eindhoven", Winkler Prins' Geillustreerde Encyclopaedie (in Dutch), vol. 6 (4th ed.), Amsterdam: Uitgevers-Maatschappy „Elsevier“, hdl:2027/mdp.39015068310138
- G. van Herwijnen, ed. (1978). "Noord-Brabant: Eindhoven". Bibliografie van de stedengeschiedenis van Nederland [Bibliography of Urban History in the Netherlands] (in Dutch). Brill. p. 284. ISBN 90-04-05700-5.
