= De Zeeuw (surname) =

de Zeeuw is a surname of Dutch origin meaning "the Zeelander". Notable people with the surname include:

- Arjan de Zeeuw (born 1970), Dutch footballer
- Cornelis de Zeeuw (fl. 1560s), Flemish painter active in England
- Demy de Zeeuw (born 1983), Dutch footballer
- Dick de Zeeuw (1924–2009), Dutch agronomist and politician
- Francien de Zeeuw (1922–2015), Dutch resistance fighter and first female member of the Dutch armed forces
- Friso de Zeeuw (born 1952), Dutch jurist and Labour Party politician
- Gerard de Zeeuw (born 1936), Dutch systems scientist
- Maxime De Zeeuw (born 1987), Belgian basketball player
- Tim de Zeeuw (born 1956), Dutch astronomer and former Director General of ESO

== See also ==
- 10970 de Zeeuw, a minor planet in the main belt named after Tim de Zeeuw
- Marinus van Zeeuw or Marinus de Seeu (c.1490–c.1546), Dutch painter
