= Parliamentary inquiry into natural gas extraction Groningen =

Dutch parliamentary inquiry

The parliamentary inquiry into natural gas extraction Groningen (Dutch: Parlementaire enquête naar aardgaswinning Groningen) was a parliamentary inquiry by the Dutch House of Representatives between 2021 and 2023 and was investigating the natural gas extraction from the Groningen gas field and the problems that it caused. The goal of the inquiry was to gain insight into decision-making regarding natural gas extraction, earthquakes, damage handling and reinforcement of buildings. The inquiry concluded that the Dutch government and oil companies had systematically ignored the safety interests of Groningen residents.

== Background ==
Starting in the 1960's, the Netherlands allowed the extraction of natural gas in the Groningen gas field. In 1986, the first earthquake induced by a natural gas field (specifically Eleveld) occurred in the north of the Netherlands. In the next decades, the number of earthquakes increased, especially above the Groningen gas field. The earthquake near Huizinge in 2012 marked a turning point, after which the attention on the earthquakes increased. Starting in 2014, the gas extraction was increasingly limited.

=== Motion ===
On 3 March 2015, the first motion was introduced in the Dutch House of Representatives proposing a parliamentary inquiry. Voting on this motion, filed by Esther Ouwehand (PvdD), was postponed and the motion was finally rejected in February 2017. Frank Wassenberg (PvdD) and Carla Dik-Faber (CU) also introduced a motion for an inquiry, but this attempt failed as well.

At the end of January 2019, voting would take place on a motion by Tom van der Lee (GL) en Henk Nijboer (PvdA), which again requested parliamentary inquiry. This was postponed on the request of coalition partners VVD, CDA, D66 and CU, who first wanted to discuss this within their parliamentary group. After discussions with these parties, Van der Lee changed the text of the motion. After these changes, the motion passed the House unanimously on 5 March 2019.

== Public hearings ==
Nearly seventy hearings had been held. These hearings took place from 27 June 2022 until 1 July 2022 and between 29 August 2022 en 14 October 2022. Among others, the following people were heard publicly:

- Annemarie Jorritsma (Minister of Economic Affairs from 1998 until 2002)
- Maxime Verhagen (Minister of Economic Affairs, Agriculture and Innovation from 2010 until 2012)
- Albert Rodenboog (mayor of Loppersum from 2003 until 2018)
- Max van den Berg (Queen's/King's commissioner in Groningen from 2007 until 2016)
- Jacques Wallage (Chair Dialogue table Groningen from 2014 until 2015)
- Gerald Schotman (CEO of Nederlandse Aardolie Maatschappij from 2014 until 2018)
- Dick Benschop (President-director of Shell Netherlands from 2011 until 2015)
- Jeroen Dijsselbloem (Minister of Finance from 2012 until 2017)
- Henk Kamp (Minister of Economic Affairs from 2012 until 2017)
- Liesbeth van Tongeren (GreenLeft Member of House of Representatives from 2010 until 2018)
- Jan Vos (Labour Party Member of House of Representatives from 2012 until 2017)
- René Leegte (People's Party for Freedom and Democracy Member of House of Representatives from 2010 until 2015)
- William Moorlag (Provincial executive Groningen from 2009 until 2015)

== Outcome ==
On 24 February 2023, the committee presented its report in Zeerijp. It concluded that the Dutch government and oil companies had systematically ignored the safety interests of Groningen residents. In their response, the fourth Rutte cabinet underlined the conclusions of the inquiry. It allocated 13 billion euros for repairing the damage and for the "debt of honor" to the local population. A motion of no confidence was filed by Jesse Klaver GroenLinks and supported by nearly all of the opposition, but was rejected by the coalition.
