= Fons van der Stee =

Dutch politician (1928–1999)

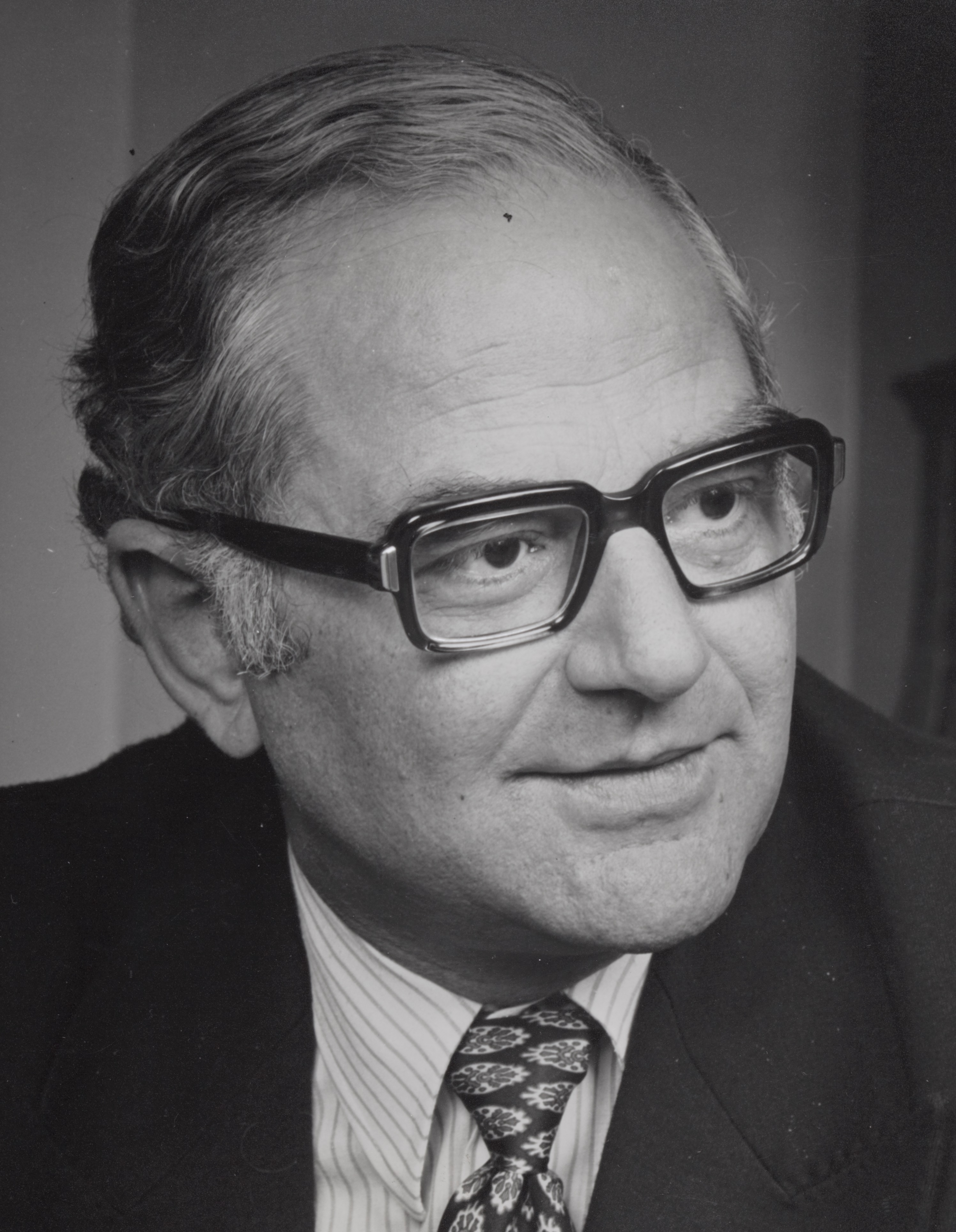
- Van der Stee in 1977

Minister of Finance
- In office 5 March 1980 – 4 November 1982
- Prime Minister: Dries van Agt
- Preceded by: Gijs van Aardenne (Ad interim)
- Succeeded by: Onno Ruding

Minister for Netherlands Antilles Affairs
- In office 19 December 1977 – 11 September 1981
- Prime Minister: Dries van Agt
- Preceded by: Gaius de Gaay Fortman
- Succeeded by: Joop den Uyl

Minister of Agriculture and Fisheries
- In office 1 November 1973 – 5 March 1980
- Prime Minister: Joop den Uyl (1973–1977); Dries van Agt (1977–1980)
- Preceded by: Tiemen Brouwer
- Succeeded by: Gerrit Braks

Member of the House of Representatives
- In office 8 June 1977 – 8 September 1977
- In office 12 December 1972 – 11 May 1973
- Parliamentary group: Catholic People's Party

State Secretary for Finance
- In office 11 May 1973 – 1 November 1973 Serving with Aar de Goede
- Prime Minister: Joop den Uyl
- Preceded by: Himself
- Succeeded by: Martin van Rooijen
- In office 14 July 1971 – 12 March 1973 Serving with Willem Scholten
- Prime Minister: Barend Biesheuvel
- Preceded by: Ferd Grapperhaus
- Succeeded by: Himself

Member of the Senate
- In office 11 May 1971 – 14 July 1971
- Parliamentary group: Catholic People's Party

Chairman of the Catholic People's Party
- In office 30 March 1968 – 14 July 1971
- Leader: Norbert Schmelzer (1968–1971); Gerard Veringa (1971)
- Preceded by: Piet Aalberse Jr.
- Succeeded by: Dick de Zeeuw

Personal details
- Born: Alphonsus Petrus Johannes Mathildus Maria van der Stee; 30 July 1928 Zevenbergen, Netherlands
- Died: 9 September 1999 (aged 71) The Hague, Netherlands
- Party: Christian Democratic Appeal (from 1980)
- Other political affiliations: Catholic People's Party (until 1980)
- Spouse: Tonny Kramers (m. 1957; died 1993)
- Education: Radboud University Nijmegen (Bachelor of Laws, Master of Laws)
- Occupation: Politician · Jurist · Economist · Financial adviser · Tax advisor · Businessman · Corporate director · Nonprofit director · Lobbyist

Alphonsus Petrus Johannes Mathildus Maria "Fons" van der Stee (30 July 1928 – 9 September 1999) was a Dutch politician of the defunct Catholic People's Party (KVP) and later the Christian Democratic Appeal (CDA) party and economist.

== Biography ==
Van der Stee applied at the Radboud University Nijmegen in June 1950 majoring in Tax law and obtaining a Bachelor of Laws degree in June 1952 before graduating with a Master of Laws degree on 29 February 1956. Van der Stee worked as a tax advisor in Arnhem from May 1956 until July 1971. Van der Stee served as Chairman of the Catholic People's Party from 30 March 1968 until 14 July 1971. Van der Stee was elected as a Member of the Senate after the Senate election of 1971, taking office on 11 May 1971.

After the election of 1971 Van der Stee was appointed as State Secretary for Finance in the Cabinet Biesheuvel I, taking office on 14 July 1971. The Cabinet Biesheuvel I fell just one year later on 19 July 1972 and continued to serve in a demissionary capacity until it was replaced by the caretaker Cabinet Biesheuvel II with Van der Stee continuing as State Secretary for Finance, taking office on 9 August 1972. Van der Stee was elected as a Member of the House of Representatives after the election of 1972, taking office on 12 December 1972 but he was still serving in the cabinet and because of dualism customs in the constitutional convention of Dutch politics he couldn't serve a dual mandate he subsequently resigned as State Secretary for Finance on 12 March 1973. Following the cabinet formation of 1972 Van der Stee was again appointed as State Secretary for Finance in the Cabinet Den Uyl, taking office on 11 May 1973. Van der Stee was appointed as Minister of Agriculture and Fisheries following the resignation of Tiemen Brouwer, taking office on 1 November 1973. The Cabinet Den Uyl fell on 22 March 1977 after four years of tensions in the coalition and continued to serve in a demissionary capacity. After the election of 1977 Van der Stee returned as a Member of the House of Representatives, taking office on 8 June 1977 but again because of the dualism customs in Dutch politics he subsequently resigned as Member of the House of Representatives on 8 September 1977. Following the cabinet formation of 1977 Van der Stee remained Minister of Agriculture and Fisheries and was also appointed as Minister for Netherlands Antilles Affairs in the Cabinet Van Agt–Wiegel, taking office on 19 December 1977. Van der Stee was appointed as Minister of Finance following the resignation of Frans Andriessen, taking office on 5 March 1980. In December 1980, Van der Stee announced that he wouldn't stand for the election of 1981. Following the cabinet formation of 1981 Van der Stee continued as Minister of Finance in the Cabinet Van Agt II, taking office on 11 September 1981. The Cabinet Van Agt II fell just seven months into its term on 12 May 1982 and continued to serve in a demissionary capacity until it was replaced by the caretaker Cabinet Van Agt III with Van der Stee remaining as Minister of Finance on 29 May 1982. In June 1982, Van der Stee announced his retirement from national politics and that he wouldn't stand for the election of 1982. The Cabinet Van Agt III was replaced by the Cabinet Lubbers I following the cabinet formation of 1982 on 4 November 1982.

Van der Stee retired after spending 14 years in national politics and became active in the private sector and public sector and occupied numerous seats as a corporate director and nonprofit director on several boards of directors and supervisory boards (General Bank of the Netherlands, Tulip Computers, Apollo Vredestein and the HMC Westeinde Hospital).

== Decorations ==
Honours
| Ribbon bar | Honour | Country | Date | Comment |
|---|---|---|---|---|
| | Knight of the Order of the Holy Sepulchre | Holy See | 11 November 1971 | |
| | Grand Officer of the Honorary Order of the Palm | Suriname | | |
| | Commander of the Legion of Honour | France | | |
| | Knight Grand Cross of the Order of Orange-Nassau | Netherlands | 9 December 1982 | |

Party political offices
| Preceded by Piet Aalberse Jr. | Chairman of the Catholic; People's Party; 1953–1962 | Succeeded by Dick de Zeeuw |
Political offices
| Preceded by Ferd Grapperhaus | State Secretary for Finance; 1971–1973; 1973; With: Willem Scholten (1971–1973); Aar de Goede (1973) | Succeeded by Himself |
| Preceded by Himself | State Secretary for Finance; 1971–1973; 1973; With: Willem Scholten (1971–1973); Aar de Goede (1973) | Succeeded by Martin van Rooijen |
| Preceded by Tiemen Brouwer | Minister of Agriculture and Fisheries; 1973–1980 | Succeeded by Gerrit Braks |
| Preceded by Gaius de Gaay Fortman | Minister for Netherlands; Antilles Affairs; 1977–1981 | Succeeded by Joop den Uyl |
| Preceded by Gijs van Aardenne; Ad interim | Minister of Finance; 1980–1982 | Succeeded by Onno Ruding |
