= Tjibbe =

Tjibbe is a Dutch masculine given name. Notable people with the name include:

- Tjibbe Joustra (born 1951), Dutch civil servant
- Tjibbe Veldkamp (born 1962), Dutch children's writer
