= Rob van Gijzel =

Dutch politician (born 1954)

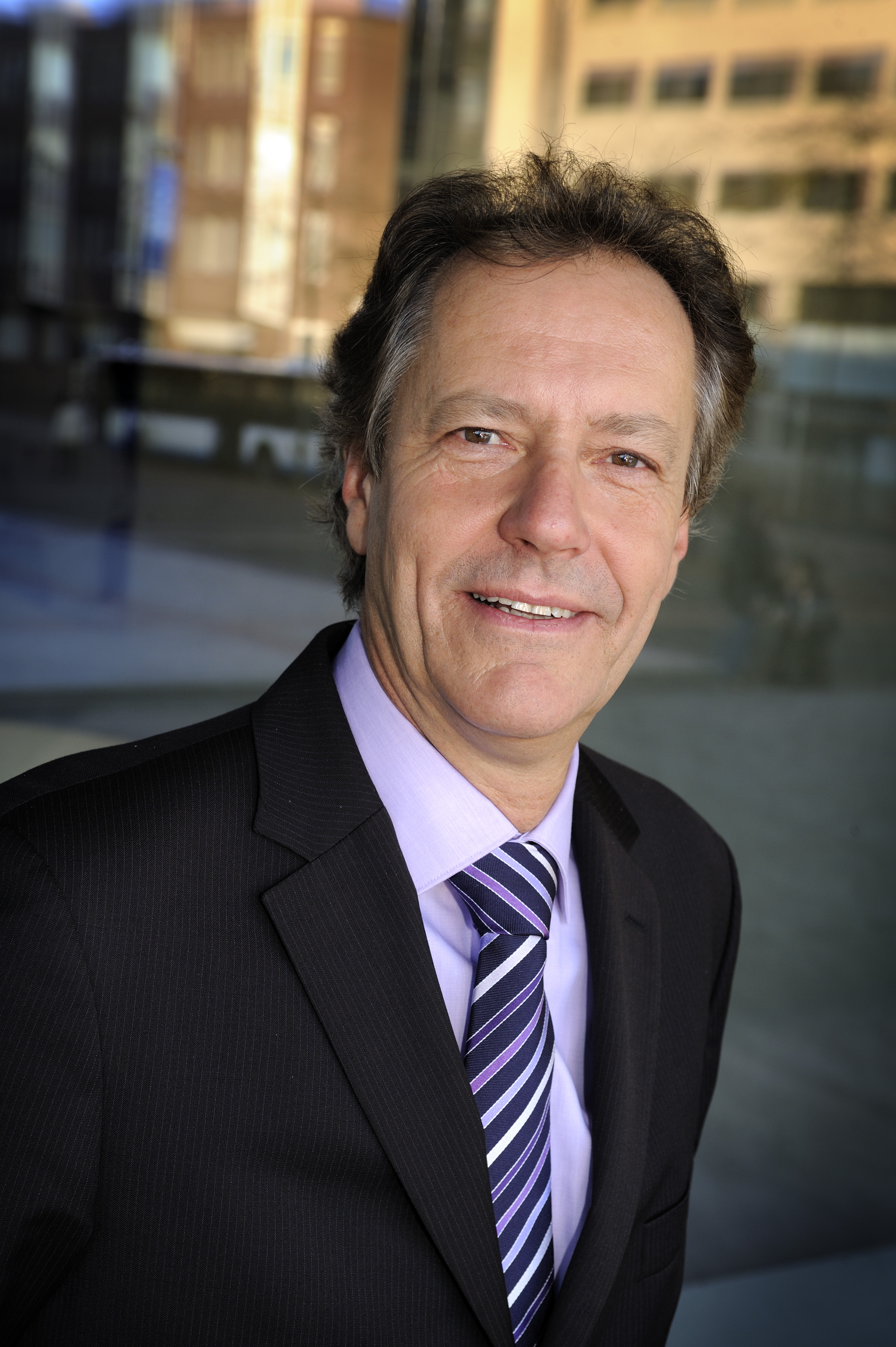
- Official portrait, 2011

Mayor of Eindhoven
- In office 8 April 2008 – 13 September 2016
- Monarchs: Queen Beatrix; Willem-Alexander
- Preceded by: Gerrit Braks (acting)
- Succeeded by: John Jorritsma
- Constituency: Municipality of Eindhoven

Member of the House of Representatives (Netherlands)
- In office 14 September 1989 – 27 November 2001

Chairman Jonge Socialisten
- In office 1979–1982
- Preceded by: Felix Rottenberg
- Succeeded by: Margo Vliegenthart

Personal details
- Born: 29 June 1954 (age 72) Eindhoven
- Party: PvdA
- Spouse: Irene van Rijsewijk

Rob van Gijzel (born 29 June 1954 in Eindhoven) is a Dutch politician. He is a former MP and was mayor of Eindhoven between 8 April 2008 and 13 September 2016.

When Van Gijzel was a student, he became an active member of the Jonge Socialisten. He served as that organization's chairman in the period 1979-1982. He was a candidate for parliament for the PvdA and was finally elected to parliament for that party in 1989, where he served as caucus spokesman on the subject of Verkeer & Waterstaat (traffic, transport, public works and water management). Following the Bijlmer disaster he picked up the nickname Bijlmerboy, due to his vociferous insistence on a full parliamentary inquiry into the aftereffects of the crash.

After that inquiry, Van Gijzel was PvdA spokesperson in the debate on the findings of the parliamentary committee. In that function he joined Rob Oudkerk (who was on the committee) in voting for a motion of no confidence in health minister Els Borst. He was also the only PvdA representative to vote against the motion of Ad Melkert, calling on the government to learn the lessons of the failings in the handling of the Bijlmer disaster.

On 9 November 2001 Rob van Gijzel was a guest on the television program Zembla, in an episode regarding the building industry fraud. The program revealed that a cartel of the largest building contractors in The Netherlands had been defrauding the ministry of public works, the Nederlandse Spoorwegen and Schiphol Airport for years; the total damage was between 500 million and one billion guilders. Van Gijzel referred to this in the program as "the largest fraud in the history of The Netherlands". Van Gijzel also commented on the building fraud in the television program NOVA on the same day. The leader of the PvdA in parliament, Ad Melkert, was not happy about the way Van Gijzel openly commented on the affair and immediately replaced Van Gijzel as spokesman for the building fraud and ordered Van Gijzel to run all future commentary on the affair by him (Melkert) first. Van Gijzel felt this made him a "muzzled parliamentarian" (Dutch: een parlementariër met een slot op de mond), making it impossible for him to execute his office as an elected representative. On 27 November he left parliament, giving as reason that he was given too little leeway to function properly. Van Gijzel also stated that Melkert feared that he (Van Gijzel) was too hungry for political consequences in the building fraud affair and that Van Gijzel felt that the PvdA caucus was protecting the responsible ministers too much. In the fraud affair, Van Gijzel had often and openly opposed PvdA Minister Tineke Netelenbos of public works and Benk Korthals of justice. Despite Van Gijzel resigning, a parliamentary inquiry into the affair was started in August 2002.

After having been considered for an alderman post, Van Gijzel was a candidate for mayor of Eindhoven in 2003. He lost out to VVD candidate Alexander Sakkers though. After losing the mayoral race, he started a political advisory agency called Politea, together with his wife Irene van Rijsewijk. After the 2004 Summer Olympics in Athens he became deputy chairman of the National Swimming Institute Eindhoven.

In December 2007 Van Gijzel once again ran for mayor of Eindhoven. The citizens of Eindhoven were allowed to vote in an advisory referendum on 23 January 2008, with a choice between Van Gijzel and fellow PvdA party member Leen Verbeek. Van Gijzel received 68.5% of the vote, although the referendum was invalid due to a turnout of less than 30%. This left the advisory decision with the city council, which stuck with the outcome of the referendum and recommended Van Gijzel (with 25 out of 43 vote). The Minister of Internal Affairs followed the recommendation and Van Gijzel was installed as mayor on 7 April, succeeding interim mayor Gerrit Braks.

On 21 November 2008 a conference was held in Almere on inner-city problems with marihuana. Speaking for 33 mayors, Van Gijzel announced that Eindhoven was going to start a city nursery to supply the soft drug to city coffee shops.

In addition to being a member of several local and regional boards, Van Gijzel is chairman of the ICF Foundation (New York), since 2013.
