= Jan Kees de Jager =

Dutch politician and businessman (born 1969)

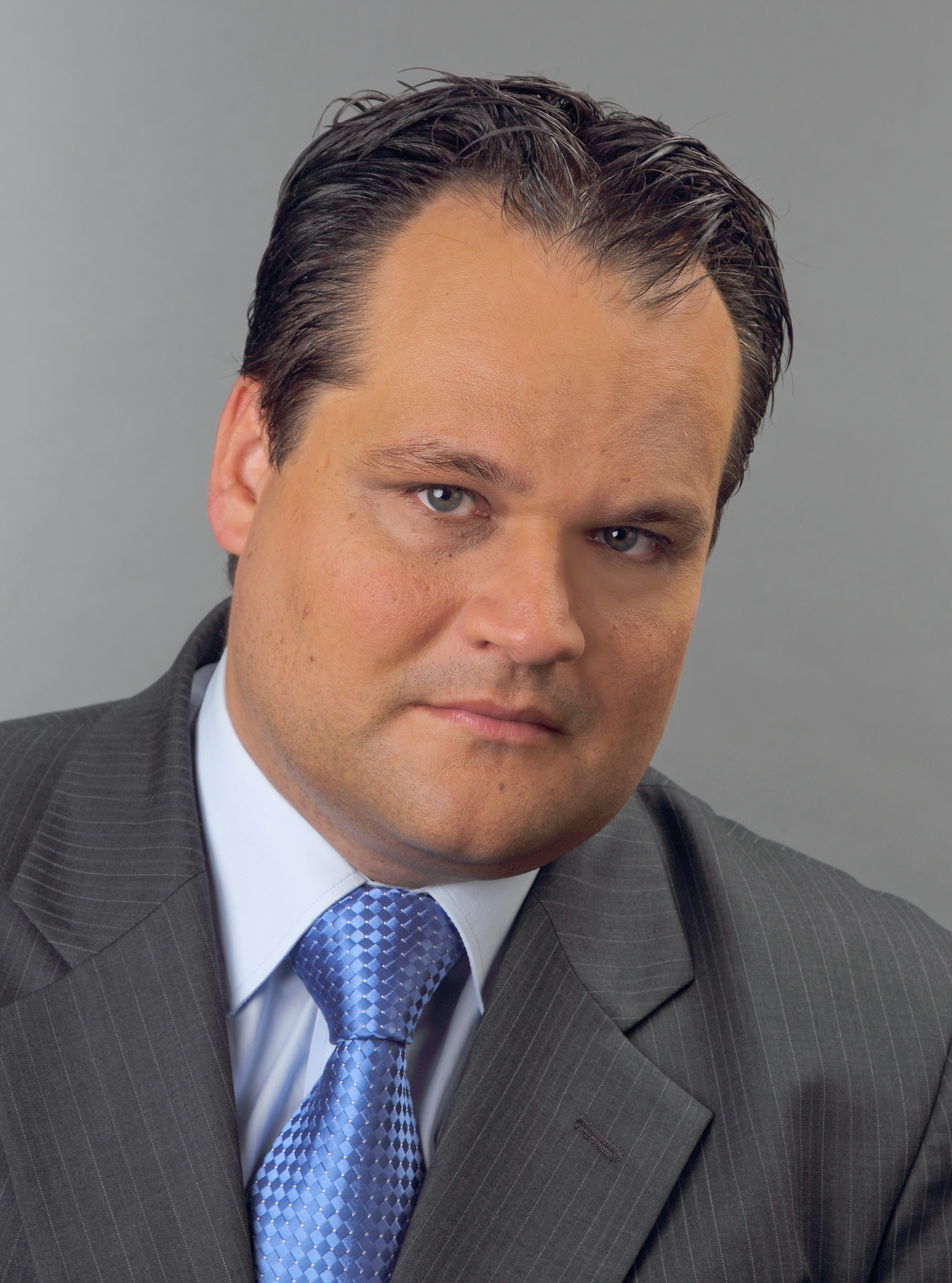
- Official portrait, 2010

Minister of Finance
- In office 23 February 2010 – 5 November 2012
- Prime Minister: Jan Peter Balkenende; Mark Rutte
- Preceded by: Wouter Bos
- Succeeded by: Jeroen Dijsselbloem

State Secretary for Finance
- In office 22 February 2007 – 23 February 2010
- Prime Minister: Jan Peter Balkenende
- Preceded by: Joop Wijn (2006)
- Succeeded by: Frans Weekers

Member of the House of Representatives
- In office 17 June 2010 – 14 October 2010

Personal details
- Born: Jan Cornelis de Jager; 10 February 1969 (age 57) Kapelle, Netherlands
- Party: Christian Democratic Appeal
- Education: Nyenrode Business University (Bachelor of Business Administration); Erasmus University Rotterdam (Bachelor of Social Science, Bachelor of Laws, Master of Business Administration, Master of Laws)
- Occupation: Politician · Economist · Businessman · Corporate director

Jan Cornelis "Jan Kees" de Jager (born 10 February 1969) is a Dutch businessman and former politician of the Christian Democratic Appeal (CDA) who served as State Secretary for Finance from 2007 to 2010 and Minister of Finance from 2010 until 2012.

== Biography ==
=== Early life ===
De Jager studied at the Nyenrode Business University where he received his Bachelor of Business Administration degree in 1990. Subsequently, he studied at the Erasmus University Rotterdam where he obtained a Master of Science degree in Economic sociology and Business economics in 1994. He also obtained a Master of Laws degree at the same university in 1996.

In 1992, while still at university, De Jager founded Information technology company Spectra Vision. All business activities were handed over to ISM eCompany (Innovative Solutions in Media) in 1997, the company of which De Jager was CEO until his appointment to the cabinet on 22 February 2010. In 2008, Sana Commerce (B2B e-commerce software vendor) has become a subsidiary of ISM eCompany.

Besides his work as managing partner of the Rotterdam internet agency ISM eCompany (which he co-founded in 1992) and Sana Commerce (B2B e-commerce software) from 2008, De Jager is socially involved in different activities. He was a member of the executive board of the Christian Democratic Appeal and organizations of various social and economic issues. For his contribution to the success of the company he worked and his efforts in various ICT and innovative ancillary, De Jager received the ICT Personality 2006 Award of interbranch ICT ~ Office.

In October 2019, KPN announced that De Jager would step down as finance chief and will be replaced by Chris Figee.

Following the sale of ISM eCompany to valantic in September 2021, De Jager became CEO of Easygenerator (authoring tool) in January 2022, a position he held until October 2023 when he was succeeded by Joop Wijn.

== Politics ==
=== State secretary for Finance ===
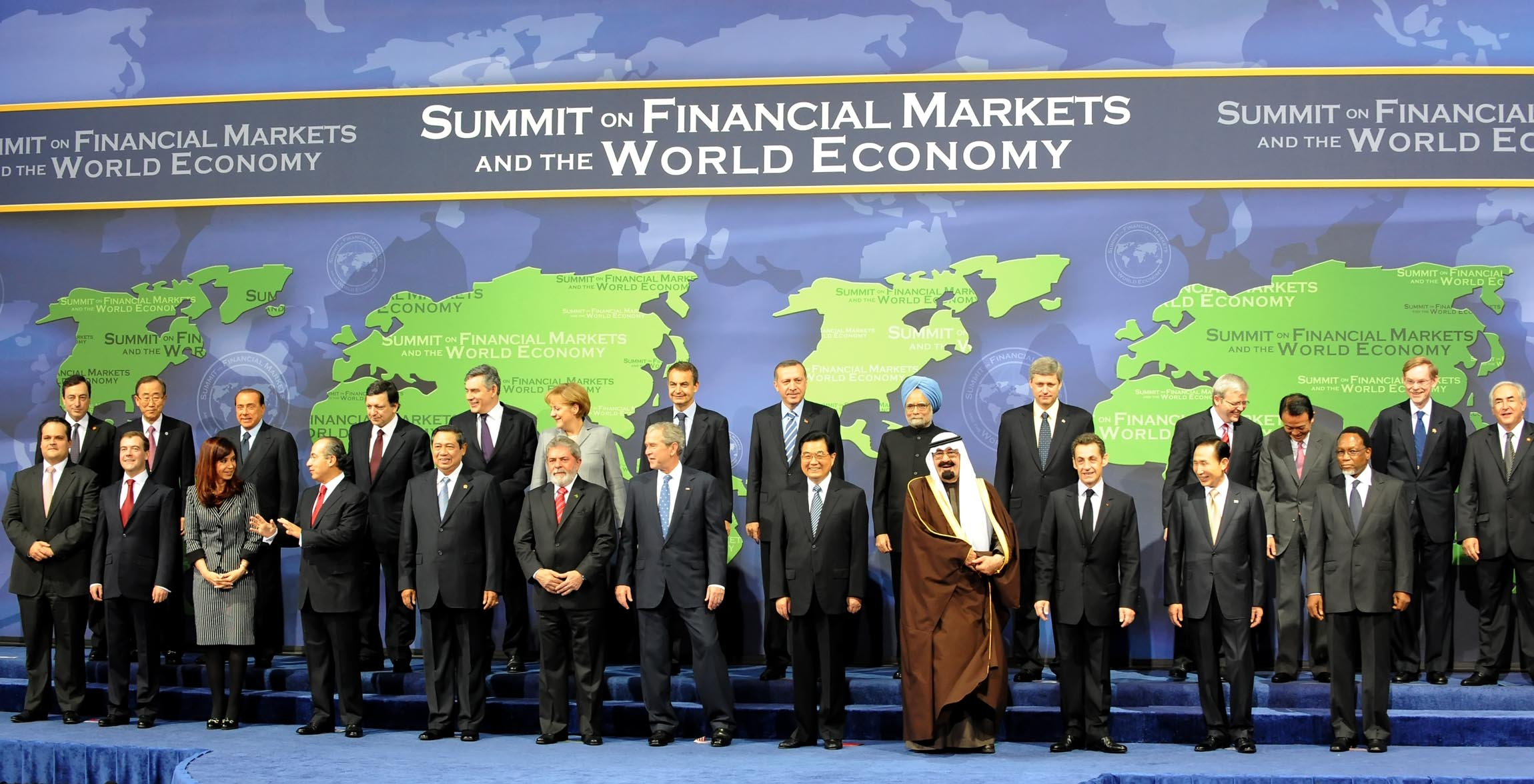
Jan Kees de Jager at the 2008 G-20 Washington summit (left)

De Jager was State secretary for Finance in the Fourth Balkenende cabinet from 22 February 2007 to 23 February 2010. His portfolio was Fiscal Affairs.

De Jager took part in the 2008 G-20 Washington summit on financial crisis in Washington on 15 and 16 November 2008. De Jager would actually participate as acting Minister of Finance in the program of the Finance ministers. After consultation with the White House it was decided that De Jager (the highest representative of the Dutch government in Washington, D.C.) could participate in the summit as head of government. De Jager advocated by the Dutch contribution to the need to improve monitoring in a more prominent role of the International Monetary Fund and World Bank.

=== Minister of Finance ===
On 23 February 2010 following the resignation of Wouter Bos, and with him all the Labour Party members from the Fourth Balkenende cabinet, De Jager became Minister of Finance. He worked on the 2011 budget and on 14 October 2010 De Jager remained as Cabinet Minister in the First Rutte cabinet with Frans Weekers as State secretary. On 26 February 2012 former Minister of Finance Onno Ruding told journalist and television host Eva Jinek he had regular contact with De Jager on specific topics.

During the 2023–2024 Dutch cabinet formation, he was asked to serve as scout, but he declined. After the new right-wing governing coalition – consisting of the Party for Freedom (PVV), the People's Party for Freedom and Democracy (VVD), New Social Contract (NSC), and the Farmer–Citizen Movement (BBB) – had agreed that their party leaders would remain in parliament, De Jager was one of three candidates identified to serve as prime minister in the resulting cabinet. He turned down the offer, and Dick Schoof was eventually chosen.

== Personal life ==
In 2011, De Jager said that he is in a relationship with a man.

== Decorations ==
Honours
Ribbon bar	Honour	Country	Date	Comment
	Officer of the Order of Orange-Nassau	Netherlands	7 December 2013	

Political offices
Preceded by Joop Wijn (2006)	State Secretary for Finance; 2007–2010	Succeeded by Frans Weekers
Preceded by Wouter Bos	Minister of Finance; 2010–2012	Succeeded by Jeroen Dijsselbloem
