= Jeroen Dijsselbloem =

Dutch politician and economist (born 1966)

- Official portrait, 2016

Mayor of Eindhoven
- Incumbent
- Assumed office 13 September 2022
- Preceded by: John Jorritsma

Chairman of the Dutch Safety Board
- In office 1 May 2019 – 13 September 2022
- Preceded by: Tjibbe Joustra
- Succeeded by: Vacant

President of the Eurogroup
- In office 21 January 2013 – 12 January 2018
- Preceded by: Jean-Claude Juncker
- Succeeded by: Mário Centeno

Minister of Finance
- In office 5 November 2012 – 26 October 2017
- Prime Minister: Mark Rutte
- Preceded by: Jan Kees de Jager
- Succeeded by: Wopke Hoekstra

Leader of the Labour Party in the House of Representatives
- In office 20 February 2012 – 20 March 2012
- Preceded by: Job Cohen
- Succeeded by: Diederik Samsom

Member of the House of Representatives
- In office 23 March 2017 – 25 October 2017
- In office 20 November 2002 – 5 November 2012
- In office 28 March 2000 – 23 May 2002

Personal details
- Born: Jeroen René Victor Anton Dijsselbloem; 29 March 1966 (age 60) Eindhoven, Netherlands
- Party: Labour Party
- Domestic partner: Gerda Grave (1992–present)
- Children: 1 son 1 daughter
- Education: Wageningen University (ir.); University College Cork

Jeroen René Victor Anton Dijsselbloem (Note: Dutch pronunciation: [jəˈrun rəˈneː ˈvɪktɔr ˈɑntɔn ˈdɛisəlblum]) (born 29 March 1966) is a Dutch politician and economist serving as Mayor of Eindhoven since 13 September 2022, succeeding John Jorritsma (VVD). A member of the Labour Party (PvdA), he has also been chairman of the supervisory board of Wageningen University since 1 April 2019.

Dijsselbloem was Minister of Finance in the Second Rutte cabinet, serving from 5 November 2012 to 26 October 2017. He also served as president of the Eurogroup from 21 January 2013 to 12 January 2018 and president of the board of governors of the European Stability Mechanism (ESM) from 11 February 2013 until 12 January 2018. He was successively chairman of the Dutch Safety Board from 1 May 2019 to September 2022.

== Early life and education ==
Jeroen René Victor Anton Dijsselbloem was born on 29 March 1966 in Eindhoven, Netherlands. His parents were both schoolteachers. He was raised as a Roman Catholic.

Dijsselbloem went to a Roman Catholic primary school in Son en Breugel and the Catholic secondary school Eckartcollege (1978–85) in Eindhoven. He studied at the Wageningen University between 1985 and 1991, where he obtained an engineer's degree (ingenieur) in agricultural economics in 1991, majoring in business economics, agricultural policy, and social and economic history.

Dijsselbloem subsequently did research in business economics at University College Cork (1991) in Ireland, but he did not graduate from this university.

== Political career ==
Dijsselbloem's interest in politics began in 1983, spurred by the mass protests against U.S. Pershing cruise missiles that drew hundreds of thousands of Dutch youth into leftwing movements. In 1985, he became a member of the Labour Party (PvdA).

From 1993 to 1996 he worked for the parliamentary group of the Labour Party. From 1994-96 he was a member of the municipal council of Wageningen. From 1996 to 2000 he worked at the Ministry of Agriculture, Nature and Fishery under Minister Jozias van Aartsen and State secretary Geke Faber.

From 2000 to 2012, Dijsselbloem was elected to the House of Representatives for the Labour Party, with a brief interruption after the 2002 general elections where the Labour Party suffered a major defeat. He reentered the lower house in November that year due to Peter Rehwinkel's resignation. In 2007, he led a parliamentary inquiry on education reform. He focused on matters of youth care, special education and teachers. Following the resignation of Job Cohen as party leader and parliamentary leader of the Labour Party in the House of Representatives on 20 February 2012, he became the interim parliamentary leader, serving until 20 March 2012 when Diederik Samsom was elected as the next party leader of the Labour Party.

=== Minister of Finance (2012–2017) ===
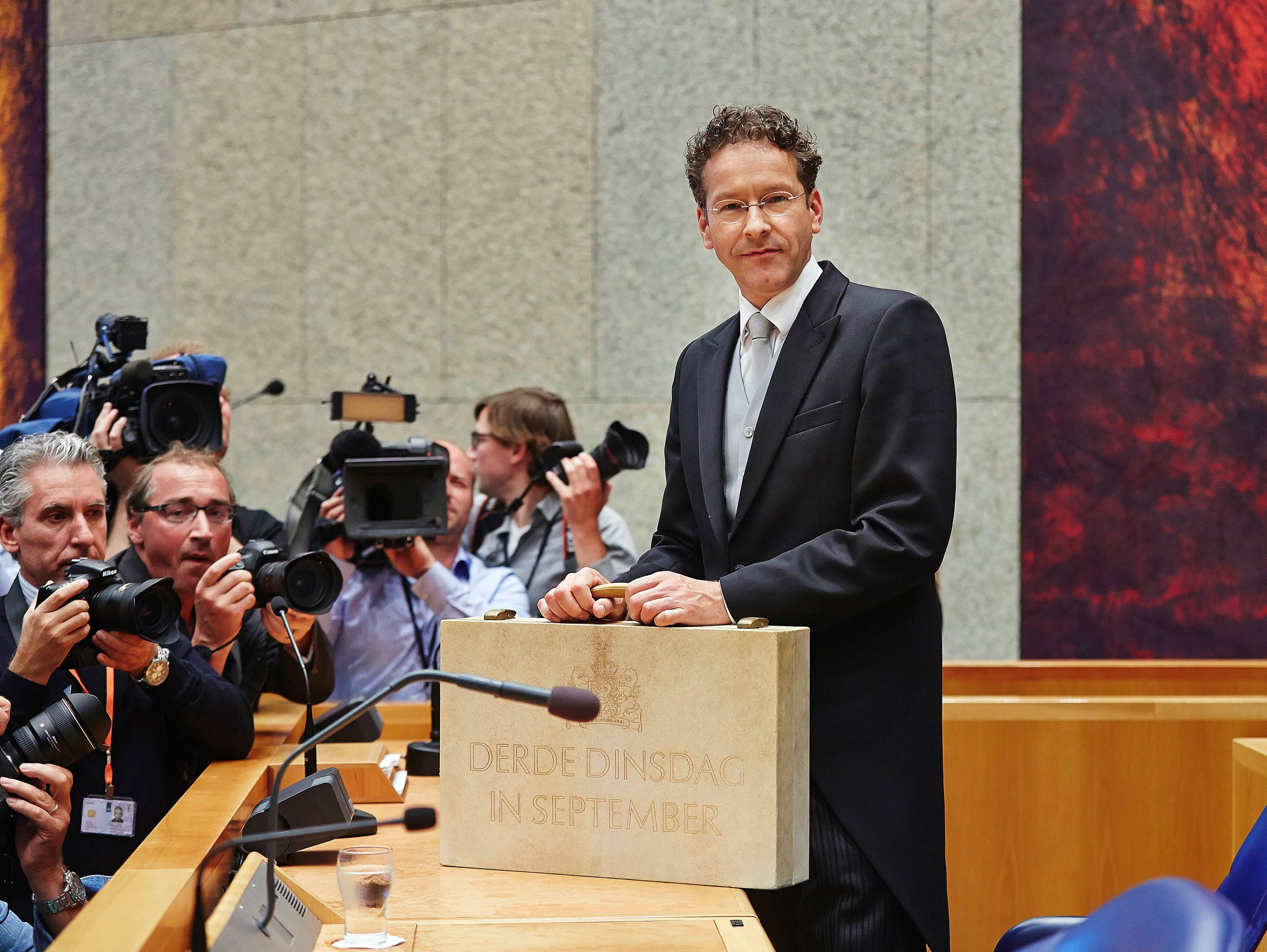
Jeroen Dijsselbloem on Prinsjesdag in 2014

On 15 November 2012, Dijsselbloem was appointed by Queen Beatrix of the Netherlands to serve as Minister of Finance in the Second Rutte cabinet. From the start, Dijsselbloem emphasised his commitment to fiscal discipline.

On 1 February 2013, he nationalized the financial institution SNS Reaal, preventing its bankruptcy. Shareholders and owners of subordinated debt are expropriated with no compensation and others banks of the country have to contribute to the takeover up to one billion euros. By December 2013, Dutch press named Dijsselbloem politician of the year, describing him as "intelligent, balanced and good at finding compromises". In a response, he said that he was surprised about winning the prize because he "does not work on the forefront".

In the Netherlands, he was later named as a possible European Commissioner following the 2014 European elections; the post instead went to Foreign Minister Frans Timmermans.

He was succeeded as Minister of Finance by Wopke Hoekstra (Christian Democratic Appeal) on 26 October 2017. He resigned from the House of Representatives the day before, while having been reelected during the 2017 Dutch general election in March; William Moorlag entered the States General to fill the vacancy.

=== President of the Eurogroup (2013–2018) ===
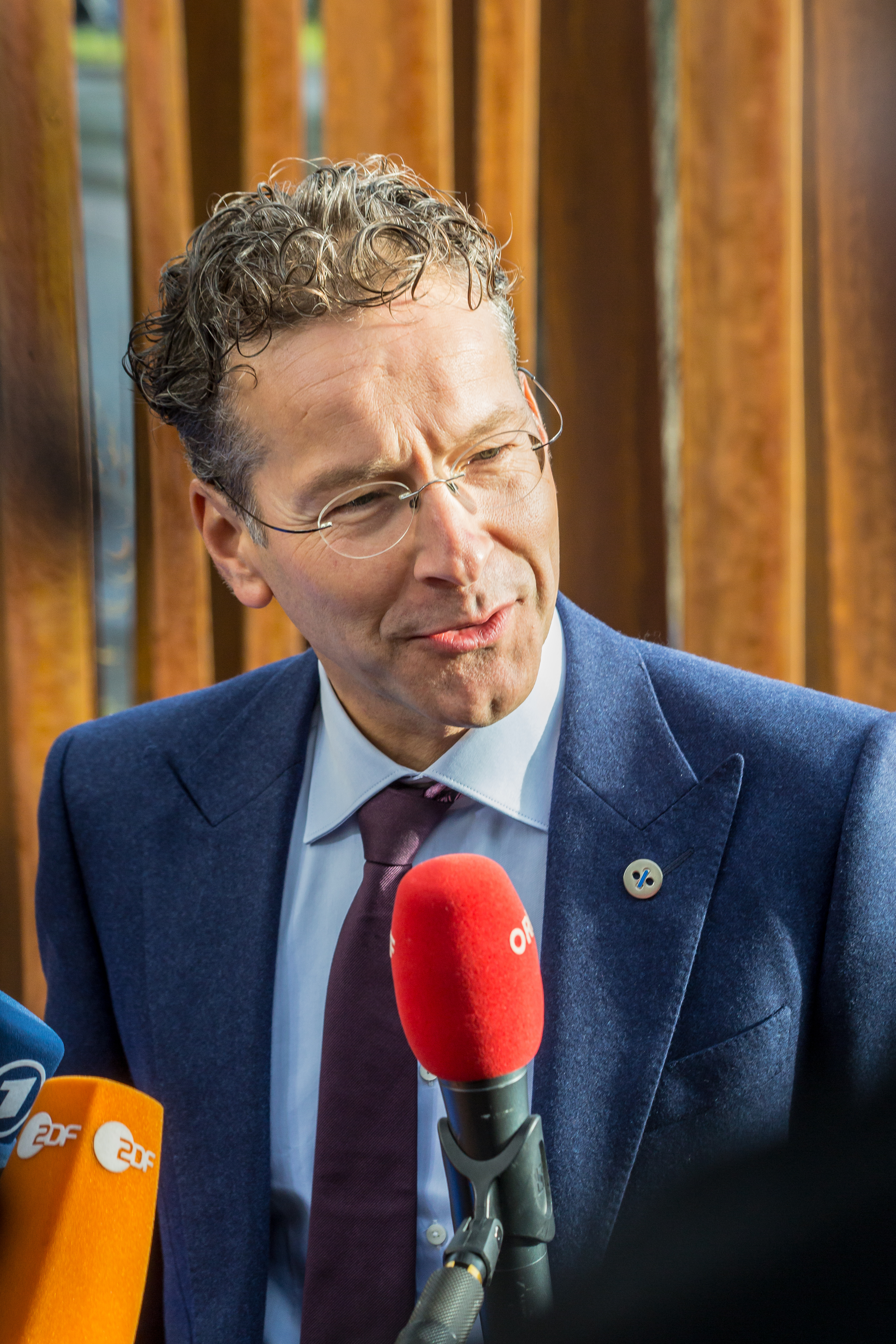
Dijsselbloem in 2017

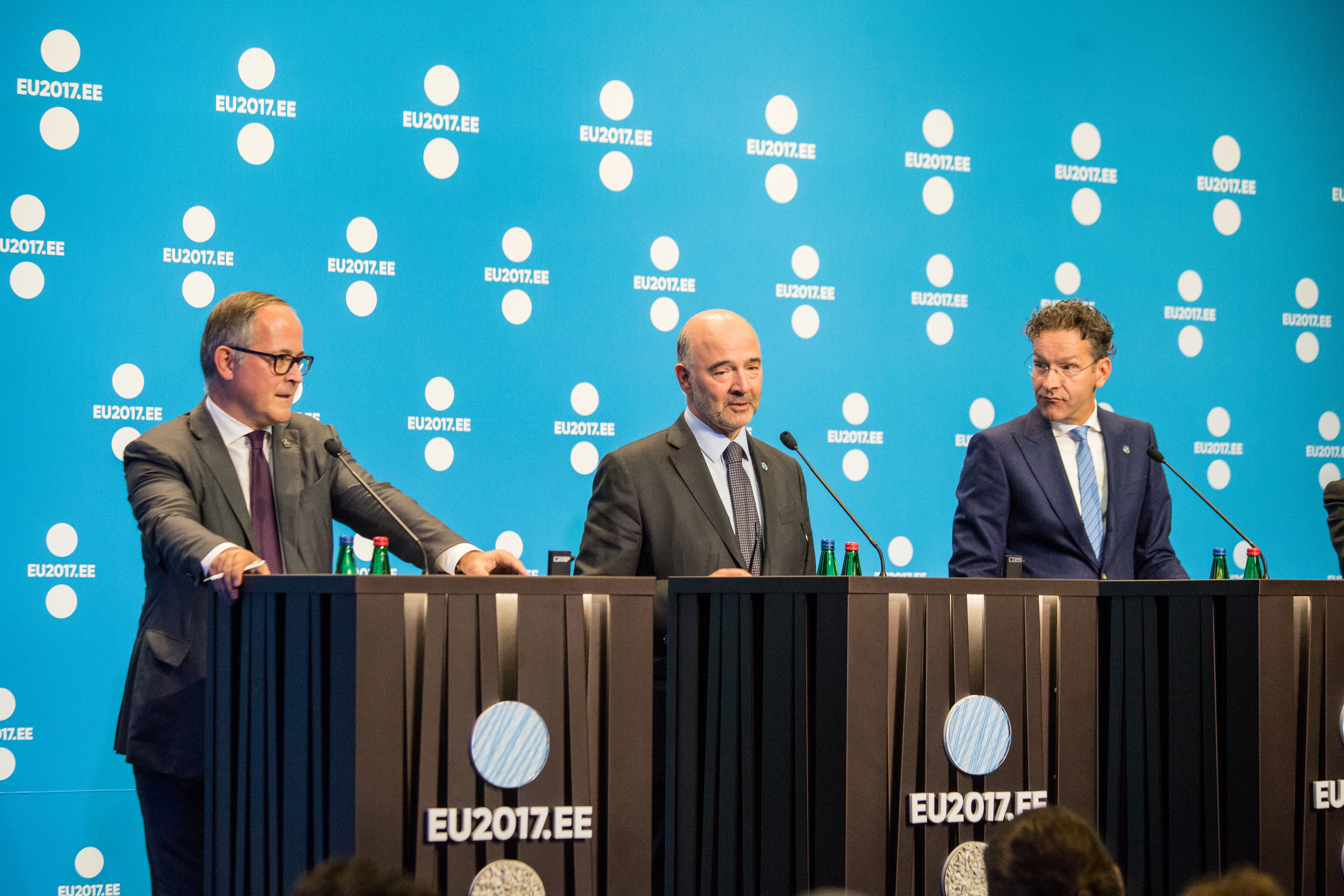
Benoît Cœuré and Pierre Moscovici alongside Jeroen Dijsselbloem in 2017

On 21 January 2013, Dijsselbloem took office as President of the Eurogroup, a grouping of the Ministers of Finance of the Eurozone, those member states of the European Union (EU) which have adopted the euro as their official currency; he succeeded Jean-Claude Juncker. Spain was the only country not to back his candidacy.

Dijsselbloem struggled early in his two and a half-year term and faced criticism for his handling of the "Cyprus bail-in." In March 2013, he took the lead in the negotiation, conclusion and subsequent public promotion of the bailout. He attracted criticism for the precedent of taking depositors' balances as part of bank rescues but said "I am pretty confident that the markets will see this as a sensible, very concentrated and direct approach instead of a more general approach... It will force all financial institutions, as well as investors, to think about the risks they are taking on because they will now have to realise that it may also hurt them."

On 24 March 2013, the Financial Times and Reuters reported that Dijsselbloem saw the Cyprus bail-in as a template for resolution of a bankruptcy. However, it was the interviewer that had used the word "template" and not Dijsselbloem himself. On 26 March 2013, Dijsselbloem said explicitly that he did not consider the Cyprus case to be a template.

As Eurogroup head, Dijsselbloem later represented European creditors in negotiations with Greece over its bailout packages following Syriza's victory in the January 2015 legislative election. Initially the Greek government formed by Syriza and the Independent Greeks pursued bilateral talks with creditors and later the Eurogroup agreed on an extension of the bailout for four months. The negotiations for a new bailout package failed to meet the deadline for a €1.1 billion repayment to the IMF on midnight 1 July 2015 (Athens time). After the 5 July Greek referendum in which the then outstanding bailout offer from the Eurogroup was rejected by 61% of voters, a crisis summit was held on 12 July to negotiate Greece's new bailout request. Ahead of the summit, Dijsselbloem questioned whether the Greek proposals were credible.

A deal for a new bailout package between the parties was finally agreed on Monday 13 July. During the debate on the third bailout agreement in the House of Representatives of the Netherlands on 15 July, Dijsselbloem criticised the Syriza government as ideologues, saying that their "every sentence had ideological baggage". He also received criticism for subterfuge in return from Greece's chief negotiator, the Finance Minister Yannis Varoufakis, who published this account in his book Adults in the Room: "From my first Eurogroup, Jeroen Dijsselbloem began an intensive campaign to bypass me altogether. He would phone Alexis Tsipras, my prime minister, directly – even visiting him in his hotel room in Brussels. By hinting at a softer stance if Tsipras agreed to spare him from having to deal with me, Dijsselbloem succeeded in weakening my position in the Eurogroup – to the detriment, primarily, of Tsipras".

In August 2014, German Chancellor Angela Merkel gave her backing to Spain's Economy Minister, Luis de Guindos, in his bid to succeed Dijsselbloem as head of the Eurogroup from 2015; De Guindos is a member of the same center-right political European People’s Party political bloc. Meanwhile, on 5 June 2015, Dijsselbloem announced he would seek a second term, prompting de Guindos saying he would mount a challenge. In a subsequent letter requesting that he be reappointed to serve another two-and-a-half years as Eurogroup chair, Dijsselbloem pledged that he would push for eurozone-wide social and fiscal reforms designed to promote the smooth functioning of the currency union. Once he picked up 10 votes at a Eurogroup meeting in July 2015, the remaining countries decided to vote unanimously for a second term.

In June 2015, Dijsselbloem, alongside Mario Draghi of the European Central Bank, Jean-Claude Juncker at the European Commission and Donald Tusk at the European Council, issued the so-called "Five Presidents' Report" on the future of the European Monetary Union, including proposals that mostly echoed calls by Germany and other northern eurozone countries to enforce spending rules across the eurozone. On 4 December 2017, Mário Centeno was elected as his successor as President of the Eurogroup.

Following the resignation of Christine Lagarde as managing director of the International Monetary Fund (IMF) in 2019, Dijsselbloem and Kristalina Georgieva were the final candidates considered by European governments as potential successors; Dijsselbloem was supported by a group of countries led by the Netherlands and Germany. Georgieva eventually got the backing of 56% of EU states which however represented only 57% of the bloc’s population, falling short of one requirement. However, Dijsselbloem conceded defeat.

==== Interview controversy ====
In March 2017, he told the German newspaper Frankfurter Allgemeine Zeitung "As a Social Democrat, I attribute exceptional importance to solidarity. But those who call for it also have duties. I cannot spend all my money on drinks and women and then hold my hand up for help. That principle applies on a personal, local, national and also on a European level" while referring to Southern European countries affected by the European debt crisis. This statement led to strong reactions by many European figures, as Gianni Pittella, head of the Socialist Group in the European Parliament (to which Dijsselbloem's party belongs) said "there is no excuse or reason for using such language, especially from someone who is supposed to be a progressive".

Manfred Weber, leader of the European People's Party Group, tweeted "Eurozone is about responsibility, solidarity but also respect. No room for stereotypes". The Portuguese Prime Minister, António Costa, said his words were "racist, xenophobic and sexist" and that "Europe will only be credible as a common project on the day when Mr. Dijsselbloem stops being Head of the Eurogroup and apologises clearly to all the countries and peoples that were profoundly offended by his remarks". Former Italian Prime Minister Matteo Renzi also called on Dijsselbloem to quit, saying that "if he wants to offend Italy, he should do it in a sports bar back home, not in his institutional role".

In response, Dijsselbloem said: "Everyone knows that I did not say that all southern Europeans spend their money on drinks and women. That is not what was in the interview and it was not my message. The anger about the interview is anger about eight years of policies to deal with the crisis. [...] I would have rephrased it otherwise probably. But it was my way of making clear that solidarity is not charity. It is not for nothing that the aid programs of the European emergency fund are accompanied by strict conditions: You get very cheap loans provided you take action to restore order. That is an important principle. For the ones who keep zooming in on those two words my message might be inconvenient. [...] It will not end well with the Eurozone if we keep breaking our previous agreements. [...] My choice of words was not right, I am sorry if you took offense, but I am still behind the message."

== Public controversies ==
=== University College Cork degree claim ===
In April 2013, the Irish Independent reported that Dijsselbloem's official biography on European institutional websites had stated that he held an MA in Business Economics from University College Cork, although he had not been awarded that degree. According to the report, Dijsselbloem had instead carried out business economics research towards a master's degree at UCC. The degree statement had been supplied by the Dutch Ministry of Finance. After the inaccuracy was reported, the official biography was amended to remove the degree claim. Officials denied any intention to mislead, but the biography as originally published presented Dijsselbloem as holding an academic qualification from UCC that he had not received.

=== Cyprus bail-in remarks ===
Dijsselbloem drew criticism in March 2013 after remarks on the Cyprus bank rescue were interpreted as suggesting that losses imposed on uninsured depositors could become a model for future eurozone bank rescues. Reuters later described the remarks as having "spooked markets". He later said that he did not regard Cyprus as a template for future eurozone rescues.

=== Greek bailout negotiations ===
During his presidency of the Eurogroup, Dijsselbloem represented eurozone creditor governments in negotiations with Greece after the election of the Syriza-led government in January 2015. His public position reflected the creditor side's insistence on fiscal discipline, conditionality, prior reforms and the bailout-conditioned disposal of Greek public assets before the release of funds. In March 2015, he said that Greece's proposed reform outline was "far from complete", and in April described a Eurogroup meeting on Greece as "highly critical", saying that "time is running out" and ruling out an early release of bailout funds.

The talks escalated in mid-2015, when Greece missed a repayment to the International Monetary Fund, its second bailout expired, and Greek voters rejected the creditors' proposal in a referendum. Dijsselbloem described the referendum result as "very regrettable for the future of Greece". A third bailout agreement was reached on 13 July 2015.

Dijsselbloem's role drew criticism in Greece and other southern European countries, where his approach was perceived by critics as punitive and contrary to Greek interests. Critics argued that the creditor programme went beyond fiscal adjustment by requiring the disposal of strategic Greek public assets, weakening Greek economic sovereignty and transferring ownership or long-term control of key infrastructure to foreign operators. Under the bailout framework, Greece sold a majority stake in the Port of Piraeus to China's COSCO, transferred railway operator TRAINOSE to Italy's Ferrovie dello Stato Italiane, sold a further stake in OTE to Germany's Deutsche Telekom, and granted a 40-year concession over 14 regional airports to Fraport Greece, a consortium led by Germany's Fraport AG.

The same approach was also linked by critics to growing anti-EU sentiment and public resentment in Greece, which made implementation of the adjustment programme politically harder. Scholarly analysis of Greek public opinion during the eurozone crisis found that the European Union had become associated by many Greeks with austerity, loss of sovereignty and fiscal adjustment, contributing to increased Eurosceptic sentiment. A 2020 independent evaluation for the European Stability Mechanism concluded that the Greek programmes preserved euro area stability but did so at "considerable financial and social cost", and identified weak Greek ownership and insufficient attention to social needs as factors that reduced the chances of durable success.

In 2026, Dijsselbloem acknowledged that Greece's first two bailout programmes had placed excessive emphasis on austerity. He said later programmes focused more on reforms that he considered necessary, but also accepted that "too much was required at the same time".

=== Remarks about southern Europe ===
In March 2017, Dijsselbloem rejected calls to resign after saying in an interview that countries receiving financial support also had obligations, using the example that one could not spend all money on "booze and women" and then ask for support. Portuguese Prime Minister António Costa described the remarks as "racist, xenophobic and sexist"; former Italian Prime Minister Matteo Renzi and Spanish MEP Esteban González Pons also criticised him. Dijsselbloem said he regretted any offence caused, but stated that he had no intention of resigning.

== Other activities ==
=== International organizations ===
- Asian Infrastructure Investment Bank (AIIB), ex officio member of the Board of Governors (2016–2017)
- European Bank for Reconstruction and Development (EBRD), ex officio member of the Board of Governors (2012–2017)
- European Investment Bank (EIB), ex officio member of the Board of Governors (2012–2017)
- Multilateral Investment Guarantee Agency (MIGA), World Bank Group, ex officio member of the Board of Governors (2012–2017)
- World Bank, ex officio member of the Board of Governors (2012–2017)

=== Non-profit organizations ===
- World Economic Forum (WEF), Member of the Europe Policy Group (since 2017)

== Personal life ==
Dijsselbloem and his partner live together in Wageningen. They have a son and a daughter.

Party political offices
Preceded by Job Cohen	Leader of the Labour Party in the House of Representatives; 2012	Succeeded by Diederik Samsom
Political offices
Preceded by Jan Kees de Jager	Minister of Finance; 2012–2017	Succeeded by Wopke Hoekstra
Preceded by John Jorritsma	Mayor of Eindhoven; 2022–present	Incumbent
Diplomatic posts
Preceded by Jean-Claude Juncker	President of the Eurogroup; 2013–2018	Succeeded by Mário Centeno
Academic offices
Preceded by Job Cohen	Chairman of the Board of Wageningen University; 2019–present	Incumbent
Civic offices
Preceded by Tjibbe Joustra	Chairman of the Dutch Safety Board; 2019–2022	Succeeded by vacant
