= List of mayors of Eindhoven =

This is a list of mayors of Eindhoven since 1920. In 2022, five surrounding municipalities merged into the municipality of Eindhoven, thus creating the municipality in its current shape.

Start	End	Mayor	Party	Remarks
1 January 1920	12 February 1942	Antoon Verdijk	RKSP	Dismissed by the German occupation.
1 February 1942	5 September 1944	Hub Pulles	NSB	Fled from the Allies.
(18) September 1944	31 December 1945	Antoon Verdijk	RKSP	
1 September 1946	10 February 1957	Hans Kolfschoten	KVP	
1 May 1957	19 May 1959	Charles van Rooy	KVP	
16 October 1959; 5 April 1967	22 November 1966; 30 May 1973	Herman Witte	KVP	Interrupted due to ministerial post, died in office.
1 December 1973	1 July 1979	Jaap van der Lee	PvdA	
1 July 1979	30 September 1987	Gilles Borrie	PvdA	
1 March 1988	1 May 1992	Jos van Kemenade	PvdA	
1 May 1992	1 September 2003	Rein Welschen	PvdA	
1 September 2003	1 September 2007	Alexander Sakkers	VVD	
1 September 2007	7 April 2008	Gerrit Braks	CDA	Acting.
7 April 2008	1 September 2016	Rob van Gijzel	PvdA	
13 September 2016	13 September 2022	John Jorritsma	VVD	
13 September 2022	present	Jeroen Dijsselbloem	PvdA	
