= 2003 Dutch Senate election =

- 26 May 2003
- All 75 seats in the Senate; 38 seats needed for a majority
Party	Leader	Vote %	Seats	+/–
CDA	Yvonne Timmerman-Buck	29.0	23	+3
PvdA	Johan Stekelenburg	25.1	19	+4
VVD	Nicolien van den Broek-Laman Trip	19.2	15	−4
GL	Diana de Wolff	6.7	5	−3
SP	Tiny Kox	5.3	4	+2
D66	Eddy Schuyer	4.4	3	−1
CU	Egbert Schuurman	3.1	2	−2
SGP	Gerrit Holdijk	2.9	2	0
LPF	Bob Smalhout	2.6	1	New
OSF	Henk ten Hoeve	1.8	1	0
This lists parties that won seats. See the complete results below.
President of the Senate before	President of the Senate after
Gerrit Braks; CDA	Yvonne Timmerman-Buck; CDA

Elections of the Dutch Senate were held on 26 May 2003, following the provincial elections on 11 March 2003. The 564 members of the twelve States-Provincial elected the 75 Senate members. The new Senate was installed on 10 June 2003. The term of office ended on 11 June 2007.

Province	States members	Population	Vote weight
South Holland	83	3,439,913	414
North Holland	83	2,572,809	310
North Brabant	79	2,400,164	304
Gelderland	75	1,960,384	261
Utrecht	63	1,152,357	183
Limburg	63	1,142.009	181
Overijssel	63	1,100,728	175
Friesland	55	640,060	116
Groningen	55	573,225	104
Drenthe	51	481,472	94
Zeeland	47	378,163	80
Flevoland	47	351,558	75

Election results
Party	1999			2003			Difference	
Party	Votes	%	Seats	Votes	%	Seats	ppt.	Seats
Christian Democratic Appeal	40,541	25.7	20	46,848	29.0	23	3.3	3
Labour Party	30,976	19.7	15	40,613	25.1	19	5.4	4
People's Party for Freedom and Democracy	39,809	25.3	19	31,026	19.2	15	-6.1	-4
GroenLinks	16,256	10.3	8	10,866	6.7	5	-3.6	-3
Socialist Party	4,801	3.0	2	8,551	5.3	4	2.3	2
Democrats 66	8,542	5.4	4	7,087	4.4	3	-1.0	-1
Christian Union	7,307	4.6	4	4,960	3.1	2	-1.5	-2
Reformed Political Party	4,281	2.7	2	4,695	2.9	2	0.2	0
Pim Fortuyn List	-	-	-	4,124	2.6	1	2.6	1
Independent Senate Group	3,880	2.5	1	2,874	1.8	1	-0.7	0
Others	1,160	0.7	0	0	0.0	0	-0.7	0
Total	157,553	100.0	75	161,644	100.0	75	0.0	0
