= Frans Weekers =

Dutch politician and lawyer

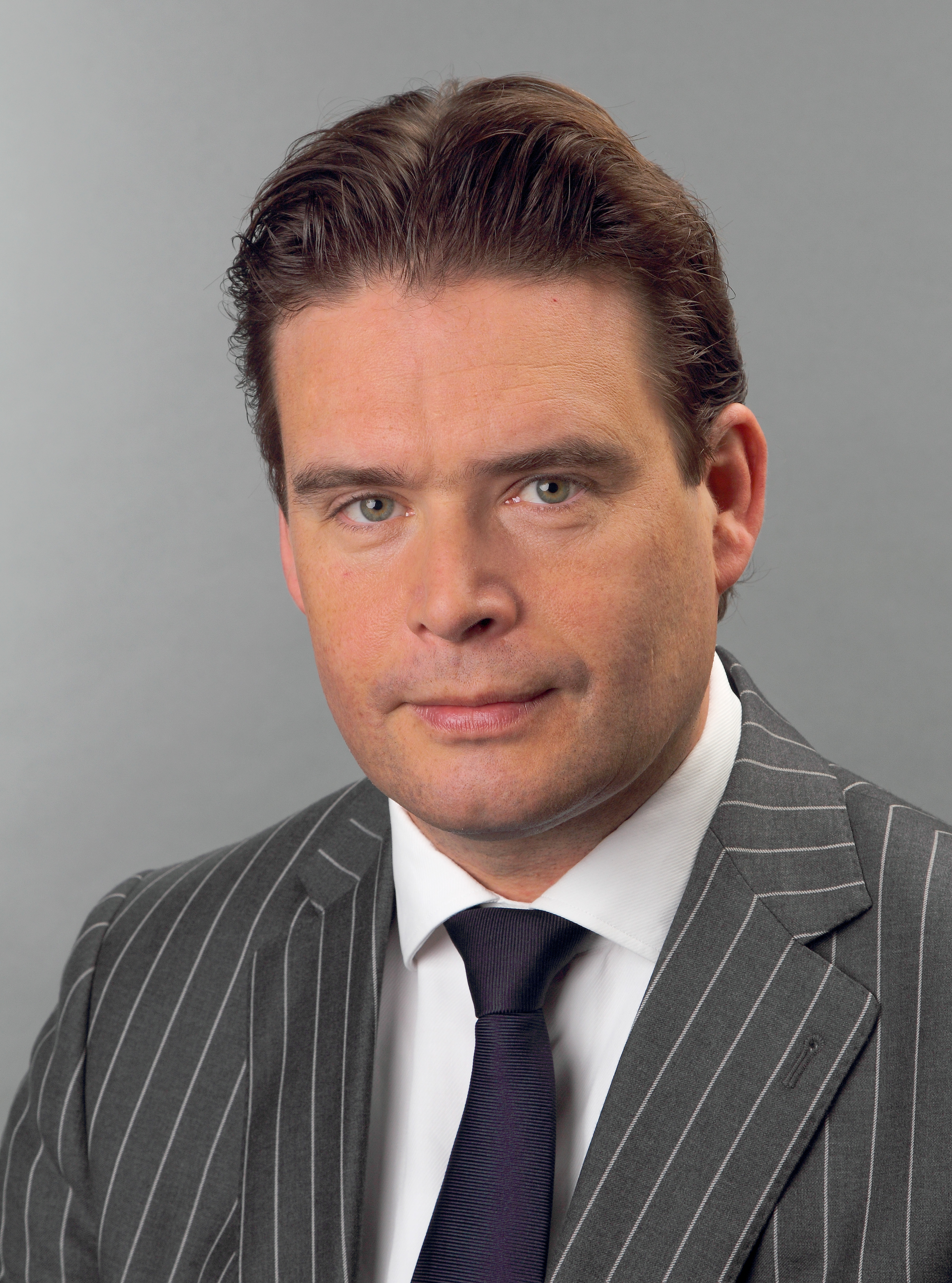
- Frans Weekers in 2011

Mayor of Beek
- In office 7 September 2015 – 15 February 2016; Ad interim
- Preceded by: Ralf Krewinkel
- Succeeded by: Christine van Basten-Boddin

Mayor of Heerlen
- In office 1 April 2015 – 31 August 2015; Ad interim
- Preceded by: Paul Depla
- Succeeded by: Ralf Krewinkel

State Secretary for Finance
- In office 14 October 2010 – 30 January 2014
- Prime Minister: Mark Rutte
- Preceded by: Jan Kees de Jager
- Succeeded by: Eric Wiebes

Member of the House of Representatives
- In office 20 September 2012 – 5 November 2012
- In office 3 June 2003 – 14 October 2010
- In office 19 May 1998 – 23 May 2002
- Parliamentary group: People's Party for Freedom and Democracy

Personal details
- Born: Frans Hubertus Henricus Weekers; 17 October 1967 (age 58) Weert, Netherlands
- Party: People's Party for Freedom and Democracy (from 1986)
- Children: 3 daughters
- Education: Vrije Universiteit Amsterdam (Bachelor of Laws, Bachelor of Economics, Master of Economics, Master of Laws)
- Occupation: Politician · Jurist · Lawyer · Prosecutor · Political consultant

Frans Hubertus Henricus Weekers (born 17 October 1967) is a Dutch politician of the People's Party for Freedom and Democracy (VVD) and lawyer.

== Early life and education ==
Weekers was born in Weert, in the province Limburg. His father was an accountant and member of the municipal council. His paternal grandfather was a wethouder in Weert. His mother was a schoolteacher.

Weekers attended secondary school in Weert between 1980 and 1987, where he did the vwo programme. He became a member of the VVD in 1986, while he was still in secondary school. Weekers subsequently went to the Vrije Universiteit Amsterdam 1987, where he obtained an MSc degree in economics and econometrics in 1992 and an LLM degree in 1993.

== Career ==
=== Legal work ===
Weekers worked as a legal advisor for the assurance company Van Rey and as the assistant of the member of the House of Representatives Jos van Rey in 1993 and 1994.

=== Politics ===
Weekers was an elected member of the municipal council of Weert from 1994 to 2003, where he was the fraction leader of the VVD. From 1994, he also worked as a lawyer in Weert, until he was elected to the House of Representatives in 1998. He served as a member of the House of Representatives from 19 May 1998 to 23 May 2002, a second time from 3 June 2003 until 14 October 2010 and a third time from 20 September until 5 November 2012.

Weekers was State Secretary at the Ministry of Finance in the First Rutte cabinet starting 14 October 2010. On 5 November 2012, he was re-appointed in the Second Rutte cabinet, dealing with fiscal affairs and finances of lower governments. He resigned on 4 February 2014 and was replaced by Eric Wiebes, an alderman of Amsterdam.

=== Later career ===
From 2016 to 2020, Frans Weekers served as Executive Director on the Board of the European Bank for Reconstruction and Development in London. Starting from March 1, 2020, he became the Deputy Secretary-General of the Benelux Union. On January 1, 2023, he assumed the position of Secretary-General.

== Resignation ==
Opposition parties have fiercely criticized his performance. According to them, Weekers had insufficient knowledge of the tax office being behind on payments, such as providing rental and care allowances to about 100,000 citizens. After Weekers heard that a motion of no confidence was imminent, he submitted his resignation on 29 January 2014. On January 30, 2014, decree No. 2014000256 on his dismissal from office was issued.

Political offices
Preceded by Jan Kees de Jager	State Secretary for Finance; 2010–2014	Succeeded by Eric Wiebes
Preceded by Paul Depla	Mayor of Heerlen; Ad interim 2015	Succeeded by Ralf Krewinkel
Preceded by Ralf Krewinkel	Mayor of Beek; Ad interim 2015–2016	Succeeded by Christine van Basten-Boddin
