= Jan Gerard Kemmerling =

Dutch mayor

Jan Gerard Kemmerling (February 4, 1776 in Gulpen – January 15, 1818 in Heerlen) was mayor of Heerlen and Nieuwenhagen.

When the French arrived in Heerlen in 1795, Kemmerling sympathized with their ideas of Enlightenment and revolution. He became secretary at age 23 for the newly established French Canton of Heerlen. In 1801, he also started to work as a notary, and in the same year became a member of the municipality. In 1805, he was made maire (French name for mayoral) of Heerlen, he was also the maire of Nieuwenhagen (till his death).

When the Prussians occupied Heerlen on July 13, 1814, he was successful in befriending them. After Heerlen became a part of the new Kingdom of the Netherlands (May 12, 1815) he remained as mayor.

King Williem I rather had civil servants who were trained in modern administratorial duties under Napoleon then once not used to this.

== Sources ==
- www.heerlen.nl
