= Tiemen Brouwer =

Dutch politician (1916–1977)

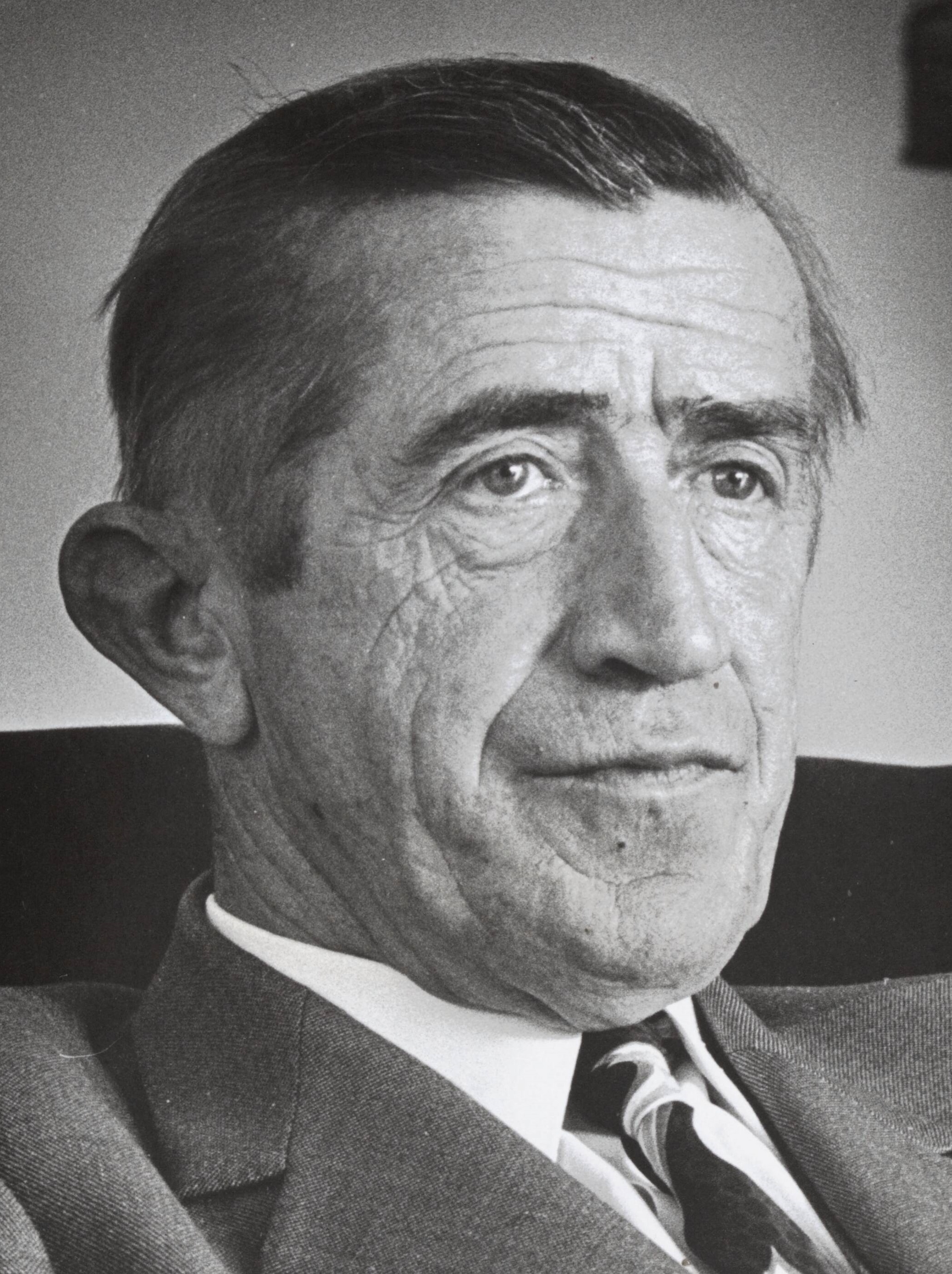
- Brouwer in 1973

Minister of Agriculture and Fisheries
- In office 11 May 1973 – 1 November 1973
- Prime Minister: Joop den Uyl
- Preceded by: Jaap Boersma
- Succeeded by: Fons van der Stee

Personal details
- Born: Tiemen Brouwer; 19 December 1916 Ellecom, Netherlands
- Died: 18 April 1977 (aged 60) Leiderdorp, Netherlands
- Party: Catholic People's Party
- Spouse: Joukje Tjerkje Catharina de Jong
- Children: 2 sons
- Education: Radboud University Nijmegen (Bachelor of Laws, Master of Laws)
- Occupation: Politician; Civil servant; Jurist; Trade association executive; Corporate director; Nonprofit director; Lobbyist

Tiemen Brouwer (19 December 1916 – 18 April 1977) was a Catholic People's Party leader and politician. He was president of the Catholic Dutch Farmers and Gardeners Association (KNBTB). He was a representative of the 'green front' faction in the Catholic People's Party, serving in the House of Representatives from 1959 to 1973. Brouwer left the House of Representatives to briefly become Minister of Agriculture and Fisheries in the Den Uyl cabinet from May to November 1973. Shortly after taking office, he suffered a cerebral hemorrhage. Brouwer died on 18 April 1977 in Leiderdorp.

== Decorations ==
Honours
Ribbon bar	Honour	Country	Date	Comment	Reference
	Commander of the Order of the Netherlands Lion	Netherlands			
	Officer of the Order of Orange-Nassau	Netherlands			
