= Friso de Zeeuw =

Dutch jurist, professor, and politician

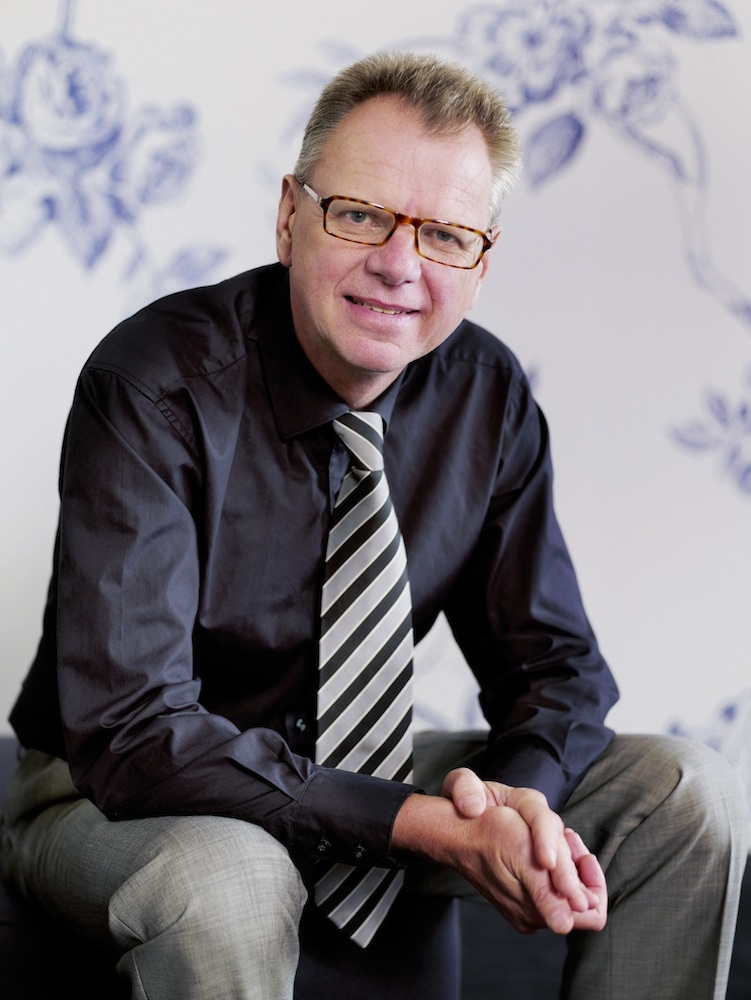
Friso de Zeeuw

Willem Cornelis Theodorus Friso de Zeeuw (born 11 January 1952, Rotterdam) is a Dutch jurist, professor and politician.
