= Alexander Sakkers =

Alexander Boudewijn Sakkers

Mayor of Heerlen
- In office 2000–2003
- Preceded by: Jef Pleumeekers
- Succeeded by: Hans Lurvink (acting)

Mayor of Eindhoven
- In office 2003–2007
- Preceded by: Rein Welschen
- Succeeded by: Gerrit Braks (acting)

Personal details
- Born: 28 May 1948 (age 77) Delft, Netherlands
- Party: People's Party for Freedom and Democracy (VVD)

Alexander Boudewijn Sakkers (Delft, 28 May 1948) is a former politician from the Netherlands. He is a former member of the gedeputeerde staten of Groningen, mayor of Heerlen and mayor of Eindhoven.

== Career ==
Sakkers grew up in Arnhem. Originally he was employed as an airforce officer, however after his study in geography, he chose a career in education. Till 1993 he was rector (head of daily ongoings) of the secondary school community in Ter Apel.

Sakkers is a member of the liberal party, the People's Party for Freedom and Democracy (VVD). In 1993 he became a member of the gedeputeerde staten of Groningen, with responsibility for economic and European affairs. In 2000 he became mayor of the city of Heerlen, in the southern province of Limburg. There he was responsible for Operatie Hartslag (operation heartbeat), which was supposed to lower drugproblems by taking care of addicts and increasing police presence. In 2003 he became mayor of Eindhoven, in the province of North Brabant. During his term in office he was responsible for the increased cooperation between the three local technology cities Eindhoven, Aachen and Leuven.

On 1 September 2007 Sakkers resigned early as mayor of Eindhoven to become chairman of Transport en Logistiek Nederland (TLN). His term as mayor would end in 2009. Sakkers is currently a member of the daily and general management of VNO-NCW. He is also chairman of the European commission for Transport of the International Road Transport Union (IRU) and he is a member of the Social-Economic Council on behalve of the employers in the Dutch transport area.
