= Gerrit Braks =

Dutch politician (1933–2017)

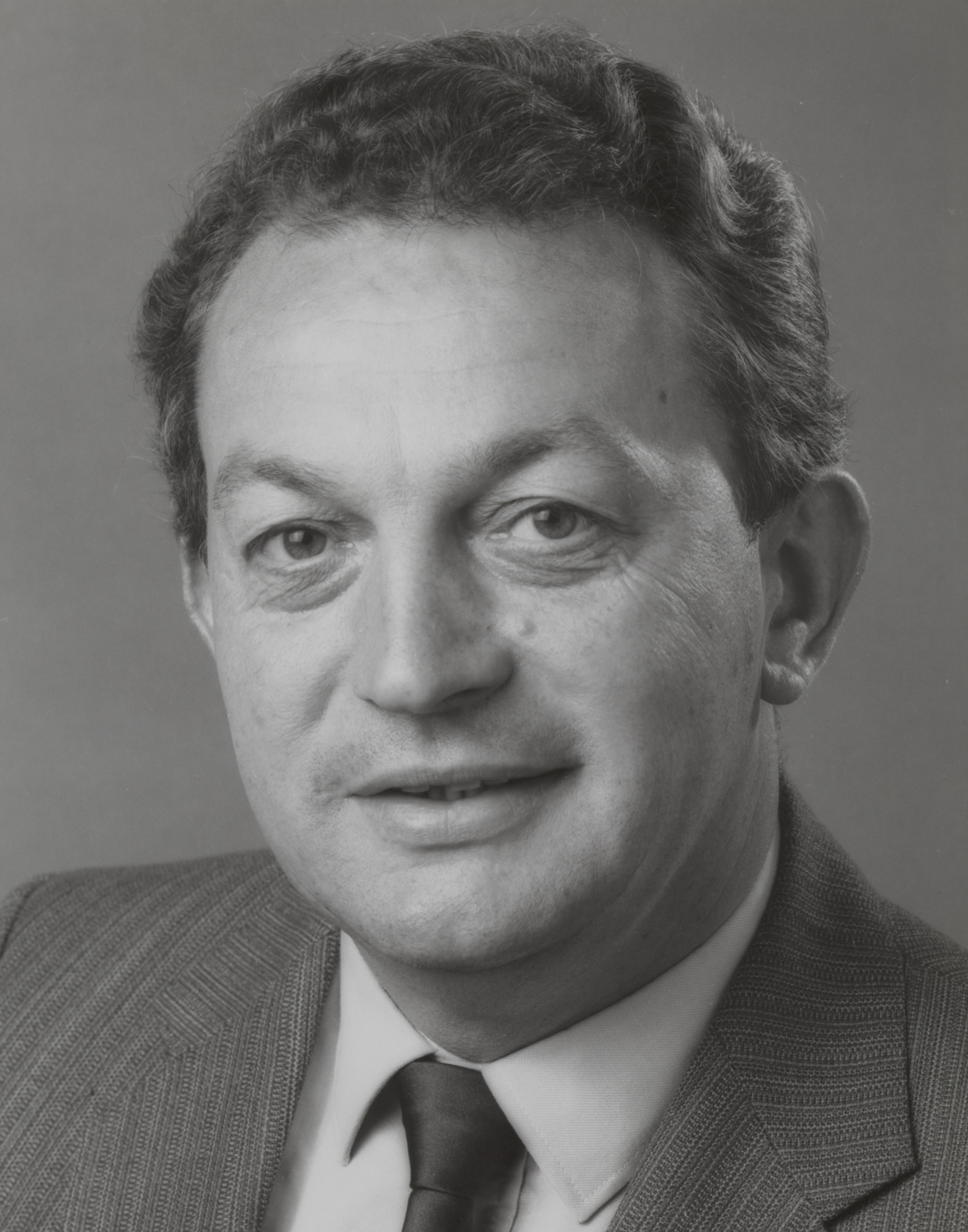
- Braks in 1982

Mayor of Eindhoven
- In office 1 September 2007 – 7 April 2008; Ad interim
- Preceded by: Alexander Sakkers
- Succeeded by: Rob van Gijzel

President of the Senate
- In office 2 October 2001 – 10 June 2003
- Preceded by: Frits Korthals Altes
- Succeeded by: Yvonne Timmerman-Buck

Parliamentary leader in the Senate
- In office 8 June 1999 – 2 October 2001
- Preceded by: Luck van Leeuwen
- Succeeded by: Yvonne Timmerman-Buck
- Parliamentary group: Christian Democratic Appeal

Member of the Senate
- In office 11 June 1991 – 10 June 2003
- Parliamentary group: Christian Democratic Appeal

Minister of Agriculture, Nature and Fisheries
- In office 7 November 1989 – 18 September 1990
- Prime Minister: Ruud Lubbers
- Preceded by: Himself as Minister of Agriculture and Fisheries
- Succeeded by: Bert de Vries (Ad interim)

Minister of Education and Sciences
- In office 14 September 1989 – 7 November 1989; Ad interim
- Prime Minister: Ruud Lubbers
- Preceded by: Wim Deetman
- Succeeded by: Jo Ritzen

Minister of Agriculture and Fisheries
- In office 4 November 1982 – 7 November 1989
- Prime Minister: Ruud Lubbers
- Preceded by: Jan de Koning
- Succeeded by: Himself as Minister of Agriculture, Nature and Fisheries
- In office 5 March 1980 – 11 September 1981
- Prime Minister: Dries van Agt
- Preceded by: Fons van der Stee
- Succeeded by: Jan de Koning

Member of the House of Representatives
- In office 14 September 1989 – 7 November 1989
- In office 3 June 1986 – 14 July 1986
- In office 15 September 1981 – 4 November 1982
- In office 10 June 1981 – 9 September 1981
- In office 8 June 1977 – 5 March 1980
- Parliamentary group: Christian Democratic Appeal (1980–1989); Catholic People's Party (1977–1980)

Personal details
- Born: Gerardus Johannes Maria Braks; 23 May 1933 Uden, Netherlands
- Died: 12 July 2017 (aged 84) Sint-Michielsgestel, Netherlands
- Party: Christian Democratic Appeal (from 1980)
- Other political affiliations: Catholic People's Party (1975–1980)
- Spouse: Francisca Antonia Maria Bardoel (m. 1965; died 2000)
- Children: 5 children
- Education: Wageningen University (Bachelor of Science in Agriculture, Master of Science in Engineering)
- Occupation: Politician · Civil servant · Agronomist · Civil engineer · Corporate director · Nonprofit director · Media administrator

Gerardus Johannes Maria "Gerrit" Braks (23 May 1933 – 12 July 2017) was a Dutch politician of the defunct Catholic People's Party (KVP) and later the Christian Democratic Appeal (CDA) party and agronomist.

Braks applied at the Wageningen Agricultural College in June 1959 majoring in Agronomy and obtaining a Bachelor of Science in Agriculture degree in July 1961 before graduating with a Master of Science in Engineering degree in July 1965. Braks worked as a agronomist and agricultural engineer in Eindhoven from January 1966 until April 1970 and as a civil servant for the Directorate-General for Agriculture and Rural Development of the European Commission from April 1970 until June 1977.

Braks was elected as a Member of the House of Representatives after the election of 1977, taking office on 8 June 1977. Braks was appointed as Minister of Agriculture and Fisheries in the Cabinet Van Agt–Wiegel following the appointed of Fons van der Stee as Minister of Finance, taking office on 5 March 1980. After the election of 1981 Braks returned as a Member of the House of Representatives, serving from 10 June 1981 until 9 September 1981. Following the cabinet formation of 1981 Braks was not giving a cabinet post in the new cabinet, the Cabinet Van Agt–Wiegel was replaced by the Cabinet Van Agt II on 11 September 1981 and he subsequently returned as a Member of the House of Representatives, taking office on 15 September 1981. After the election of 1982 Braks was appointed again as Minister of Agriculture and Fisheries in the Cabinet Lubbers I, taking office on 4 November 1982. After the election of 1986 Braks again returned as a Member of the House of Representatives, taking office on 3 June 1986. Following the cabinet formation of 1986 Braks continued as Minister of Education and Sciences in the Cabinet Lubbers II, taking office on 14 July 1986. The Cabinet Lubbers II fell on 3 May 1989 and continued to serve in a demissionary capacity. After the election of 1989 Braks once again returned as a Member of the House of Representatives, taking office on 14 September 1989. Braks served as acting Minister of Education and Sciences from 14 September 1989 until 7 November 1989 following the election of Wim Deetman as Speaker of the House of Representatives. Following the cabinet formation of 1989 Braks remained as the recently renamed Minister of Agriculture, Nature and Fisheries in the Cabinet Lubbers III, taking office on 7 November 1989. On 18 September 1990 Braks resigned after the Labour Party the coalition partner in the cabinet had lost confidence in the functioning of Braks.

Braks remained active in national politics, and became active in the public sector and occupied numerous seats as a nonprofit director on several boards of directors and supervisory boards (Institute of Environmental Sciences, Royal Geographical Society and the LEI Wageningen UR) and worked as media administrator for the public broadcaster Catholic Radio Broadcasting (KRO) serving as Chairman of the Supervisory board from 1 May 1991 until 10 July 1996. Braks was elected as a Member of the Senate after the Senate election of 1991, taking office on 11 June 1991. After the Senate election of 1999 Braks was selected as Parliamentary leader of the Christian Democratic Appeal in the Senate, taking office on 8 June 1999. Braks was nominated as President of the Senate following the retirement of Frits Korthals Altes, taking office on 2 October 2001. In February 2003 Braks announced his retirement from national politics and that he wouldn't stand for the Senate election of 2003 and continued to serve until the end of the parliamentary term on 10 June 2003.

Braks retired after spending 26 years in national politics but remained active in the private sector and public sector and continued to occupy numerous seats as a corporate director and nonprofit director on several boards of directors and supervisory boards (Rabobank, Campina, UTZ Certified, Enza Zaden, Vereniging Natuurmonumenten and the European Centre for Nature Conservation) and served on several state commissions and councils on behalf of the government (Institute for Multiparty Democracy and Staatsbosbeheer). In August 2007 Braks was appointed as Ad interim Mayor of Eindhoven following a proposed referendum for the introduction of elected Mayors, serving from 1 September 2007 until 7 April 2008.

Braks was known for his abilities as a debater and policy wonk. Braks continued to comment on political affairs until his death at the age of 84.

== Other functions ==
From 11 March 1991 until 1 April 1996 he was chairman of the Katholieke Radio Omroep. On 1 September 2007 he was named acting mayor of Eindhoven until after a referendum the next mayor was named by the crown on 7 April 2008.

== Honours ==
He was invested as a Commander in the Order of the Netherlands Lion and as a Knight of the Order of Orange-Nassau. He also received the Jacoba van Beierenprijs in 1990, an honorary badge from the Wageningen University and Research Centre in 1993 and was an honorary citizen of the Dutch province of North Brabant. The Spanish king made him Knight Grand Cross in the Order of Isabella the Catholic.

== Decorations ==
=== National ===
- Commander of the Order of the Netherlands Lion (1 May 1991)
- Commander of the Order of Orange-Nassau (10 June 2003)
- Knight of the Order of the Netherlands Lion (26 October 1981)
- Knight of the Order of Orange-Nassau (30 April 1996)

=== Foreign ===
- Belgium: Grand Cross of the Order of Leopold II (15 June 1992)
- France:
  - Grand Officer of the Order of Legion of Honour (20 November 1988)
  - Commander of the Order of Agricultural Merit (10 December 1986)
- Spain: Knight Grand Cross of the Order of Isabella the Catholic (17 September 1987)

Party political offices
Preceded by Luck van Leeuwen	Parliamentary leader of the Christian Democratic Appeal in the Senate; 1999–2001	Succeeded by Yvonne Timmerman-Buck
Political offices
Preceded by Fons van der Stee	Minister of Agriculture and Fisheries; 1980–1981; 1982–1989	Succeeded by Jan de Koning
Preceded by Jan de Koning	Minister of Agriculture and Fisheries; 1980–1981; 1982–1989	Succeeded by Himself as Minister of Agriculture, Nature and Fisheries
Preceded by Wim Deetman	Minister of Education and Sciences; Ad interim 1989	Succeeded by Jo Ritzen
Preceded by Himself as Minister of Agriculture and Fisheries	Minister of Agriculture, Nature and Fisheries; 1989–1990	Succeeded by Bert de Vries; Ad interim
Preceded by Frits Korthals Altes	President of the Senate; 2001–2003	Succeeded by Yvonne Timmerman-Buck
Preceded by Alexander Sakkers	Mayor of Eindhoven; Ad interim 2007–2008	Succeeded by Rob van Gijzel
Media offices
Preceded by Ben Schmitz	Chairman of the Supervisory board of the Catholic Radio Broadcasting; 1991–1996	Succeeded by Frans Slangen
