= Yvonne Timmerman-Buck =

Dutch politician

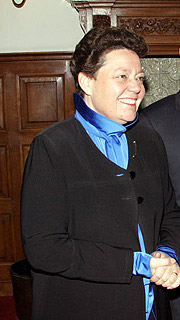
- Timmerman-Buck in 2005

Member of the Council of State
- In office 1 November 2009 – 31 december 2018
- Vice President: See list: Herman Tjeenk Willink (2009–2012) Piet Hein Donner (2012–2018) Thom de Graaf (2018)

President of the Senate
- In office 17 June 2003 – 6 October 2009
- Preceded by: Gerrit Braks
- Succeeded by: René van der Linden

Parliamentary leader in the Senate
- In office 2 October 2001 – 17 June 2003
- Preceded by: Gerrit Braks
- Succeeded by: Jos Werner
- Parliamentary group: Christian Democratic Appeal

Member of the Senate
- In office 8 July 1999 – 1 November 2009
- Parliamentary group: Christian Democratic Appeal

Personal details
- Born: Yvonne Elisabeth Marie Antoinette Buck; 26 July 1956 (age 70) Kerkrade, Netherlands
- Party: Christian Democratic Appeal (from 1980)
- Other political affiliations: Catholic People's Party (until 1980)
- Spouse: Maximiliaan Timmerman (m. 1981)
- Children: 3 children
- Parent: Werner Buck (1925–2010) (father)
- Education: Tilburg University (Bachelor of Laws, Master of Laws)
- Occupation: Politician · Civil servant · Jurist · Researcher · Nonprofit director · Media administrator · Academic administrator

Yvonne Elisabeth Marie Antoinette Timmerman-Buck (born 26 July 1956) is a Dutch politician of the Christian Democratic Appeal (CDA) party and jurist. She was a Member of the Council of State from 1 November 2009 until 2018.

== Early life ==
Timmerman-Buck was born in Kerkrade on 26 July 1956. Her father Werner Buck was a politician of the Catholic People's Party and was State Secretary of Housing, Spatial Planning and the Environment in the Cabinet Biesheuvel I.

== Career ==
Timmerman-Buck was vice president of the Dutch Equal Treatment Commission from 1994 until 2001.

Timmerman-Buck was a Senator from June 1999 until November 2009. She was President of the Senate in the period 2003–2009, the first female to have the position. Timmerman-Buck has been a member of the State Council since 1 November 2009.

== Personal life ==
Timmerman-Buck has been married to Maximiliaan Timmerman since 1981.

== Decorations ==
Honours
Ribbon bar	Honour	Country	Date	Comment
	Knight of the Order of Orange-Nassau	Netherlands	30 April 2006	

Party political offices
Preceded by Gerrit Braks	Parliamentary leader of the Christian Democratic Appeal in the Senate; 2001–2003	Succeeded by Jos Werner
Civic offices
Unknown	Vice Chairwoman of the Equal Treatment Commission; 1994–2001	Unknown
Political offices
Preceded by Gerrit Braks	President of the Senate; 2003–2009	Succeeded by René van der Linden
Non-profit organization positions
Unknown	Chairwoman of the Marga Klompé Foundation; 2000–present	Incumbent
Media offices
Unknown	Chairwoman of the Catholic Radio Broadcasting; 2007–2015	Succeeded by Paul Rüpp
