= Avant-Garde van Groeninge =

Restaurant in Eindhoven, North Brabant, Netherlands

Coordinates: 51°26′29.79″N 5°27′57.12″E

- Interactive map of Avant-Garde van Groeninge

Restaurant information
- Established: 2002
- Closed: yes
- Head chef: Johan van Groeninge
- Food type: French, International
- Rating: Michelin Guide
- Location: Frederiklaan 10d, Eindhoven, 5616 NH, Netherlands
- Seating capacity: 70
- Website: Official website

Avant-Garde van Groeninge was a restaurant located in Eindhoven in the Netherlands. It was housed in the Philips Stadion, the home ground of soccer club PSV Eindhoven. It was a fine dining restaurant that has been awarded one Michelin star in the period 2004–2018.

GaultMillau awarded the restaurant 15 out of 20 points.

Owner and head chef of Avant-Garde van Groeninge was Johan van Groeninge.

The restaurant was a continuation of Michelin starred Brasserie de Eglantier in Hilvarenbeek. Chef Van Groeninge and his team hoped to bring the star with them to Eindhoven. This did not materialize and they lost the star. They had to wait till 2004 to receive the star again.

Avant-Garde van Groeninge was a member of Les Patrons Cuisiniers.

== See also ==
- List of Michelin starred restaurants in the Netherlands
