= John Jorritsma =

Dutch politician

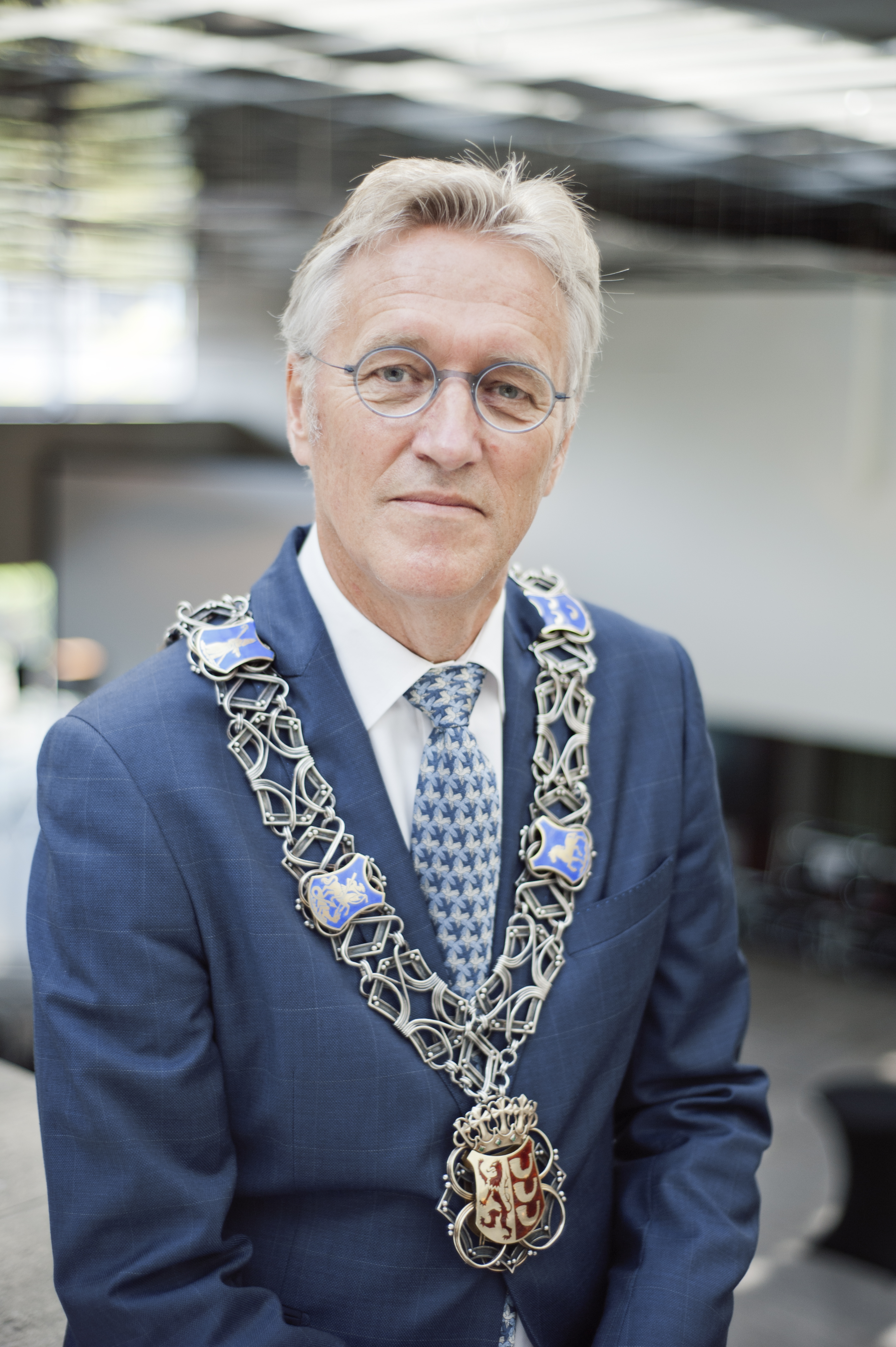
Jorritsma as Mayor of Eindhoven, 2016

Johannes Arnoldus "John" Jorritsma (born 16 September 1956) is a Dutch politician serving as Mayor of Eindhoven from 13 September 2016 to 13 September 2022, and succeeded by Jeroen Dijsselbloem (PvdA). A member of the People's Party for Freedom and Democracy (VVD), he previously was the King's Commissioner of the province of Friesland between 16 May 2008 and 12 September 2016.

A native of Bolsward, Jorritsma was a member of the States of North Brabant from 1994 to 1998 and Mayor of Cranendonck between 1997 and 2002.
