= Cornelis de Zeeuw =

- Born: 1540s Antwerp
- Died: 1570s

Cornelis de Zeeuw (1540s – 1570s) was a Flemish painter from Antwerp active in England.

De Zeeuw was probably born in Antwerp where his name appears in the Antwerp Liggeren as 'Cornelis Jacops de Zeeu' in 1558. The name Zeeu or Seeu appears more often in the Liggeren, and a "Cornelis de Zeeu" was also mentioned in the Liggeren for the year 1486, so he probably came from a family of artists who were members of the Antwerp Guild of St. Luke. For years he was considered the painter of the Moucheron family portrait, which is dated 1563, but an English portrait dated 1565 has led historians to believe he moved to England in that year. He possibly moved to England earlier.

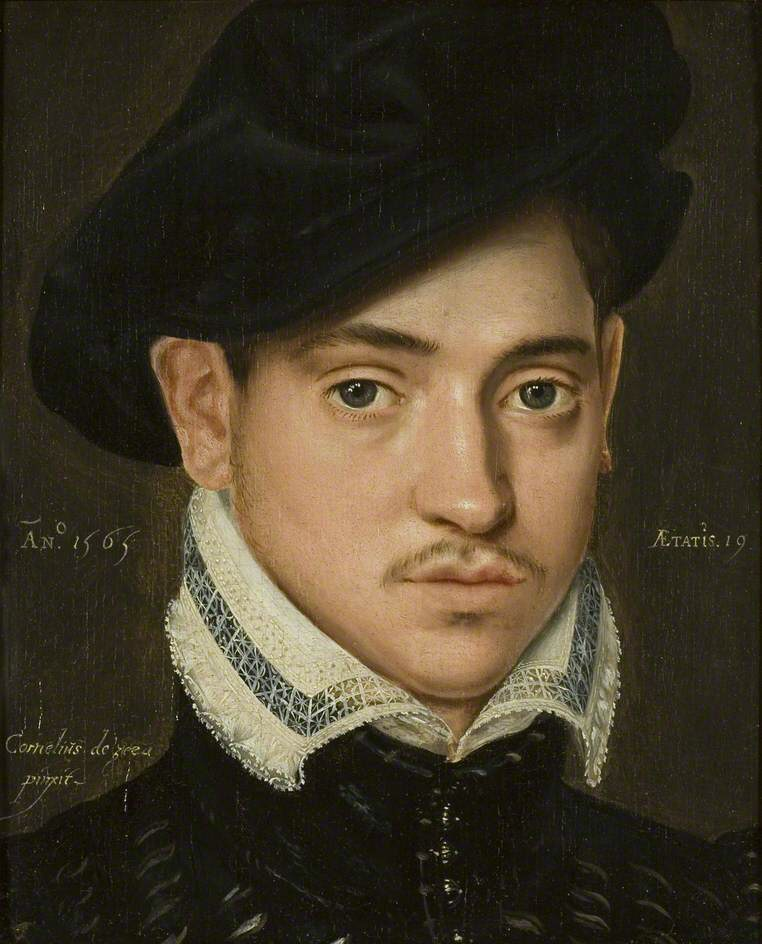
Portrait of a young man, 1565, Bristol City Museum and Art Gallery

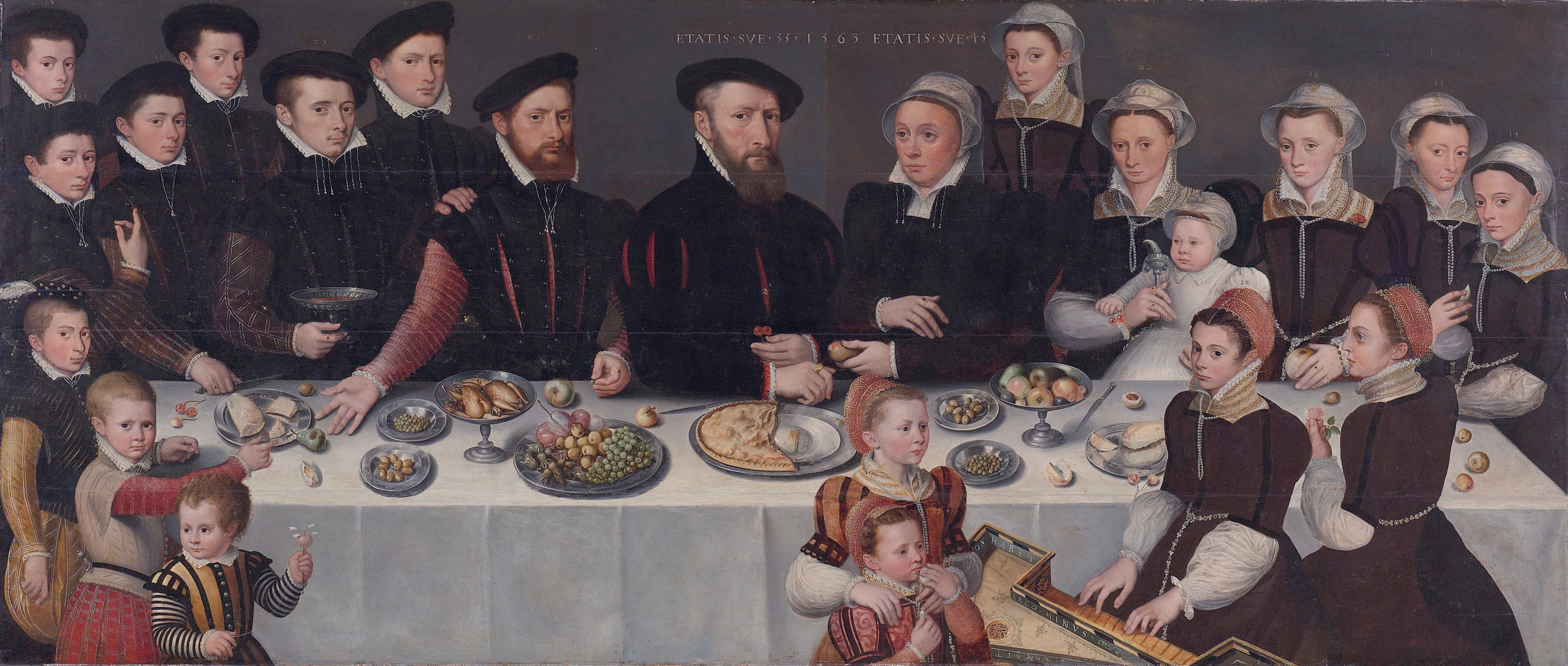
The Moucheron family portrait, 1563, Rijksmuseum
