= Onno Ruding =

Dutch politician (born 1939)

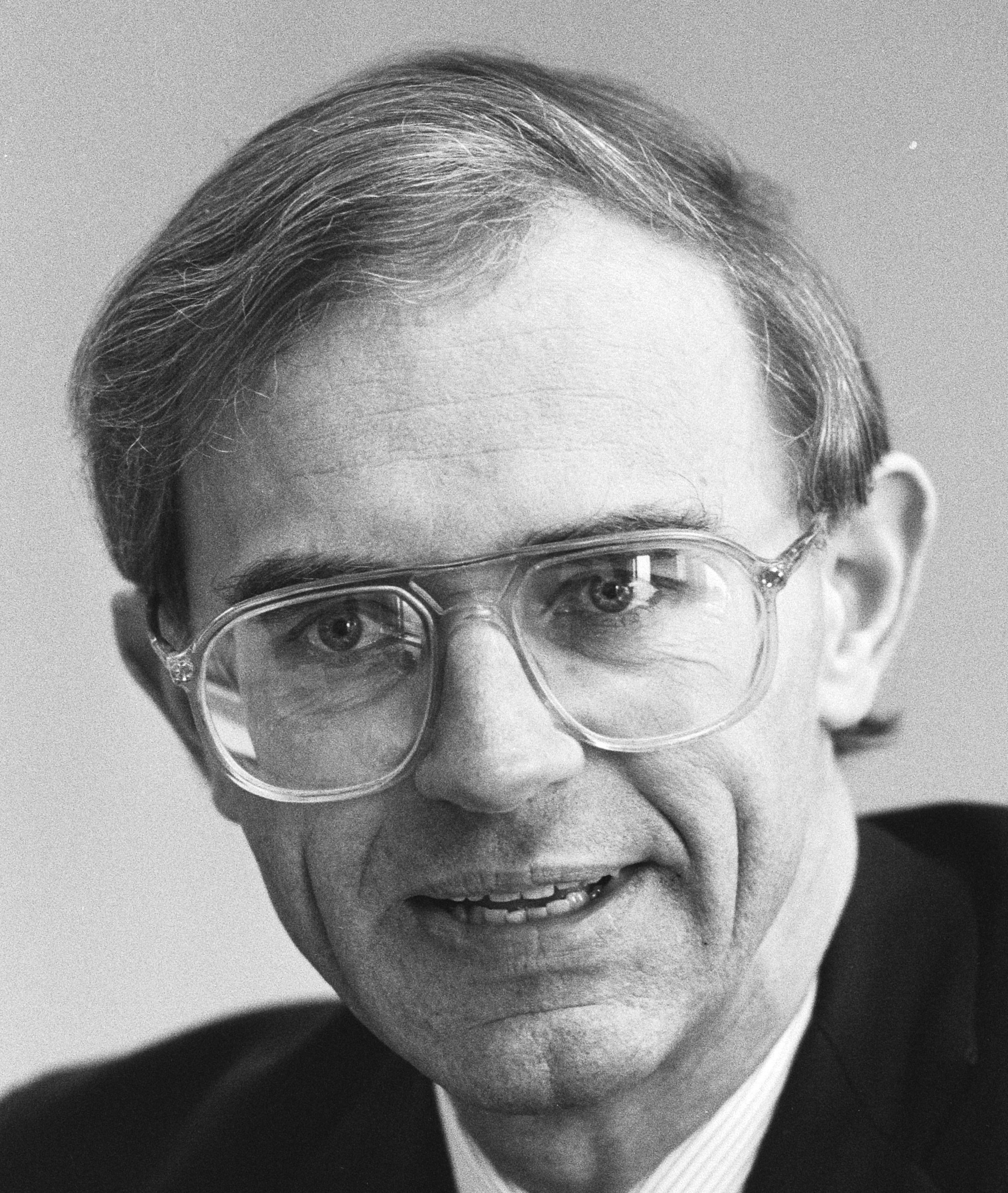
- Ruding in 1985

Member of the Social and Economic Council
- In office 1 February 1990 – 21 March 1992
- Chairman: Theo Quené

Member of the House of Representatives
- In office 3 June 1986 – 14 juli 1986
- Parliamentary group: Christian Democratic Appeal

Minister of Finance
- In office 4 November 1982 – 7 November 1989
- Prime Minister: Ruud Lubbers
- Preceded by: Fons van der Stee
- Succeeded by: Wim Kok

Personal details
- Born: 15 August 1939 (age 87) Breda, Netherlands
- Party: Christian Democratic Appeal (from 1980)
- Other political affiliations: Catholic People's Party (1967–1980)
- Spouse: Renée Ruding (m. 1969)
- Children: 3 daughters
- Education: Erasmus University Rotterdam (Bachelor of Economics, Master of Economics, Doctor of Philosophy)
- Occupation: Politician · Civil servant · Economist · Researcher · Businessman · Banker · Financial adviser · Financial analyst · Corporate director · Nonprofit director · Trade association executive · Author · Lobbyist

Military service
- Allegiance: Netherlands
- Branch/service: Royal Netherlands Army
- Years of service: 1964–1965 (Conscription); 1965–1969 (Reserve)
- Rank: Corporal
- Unit: Regiment van Heutsz
- Battles/wars: Cold War

Herman Onno Christiaan Rudolf "Onno" Ruding (born 15 August 1939) is a retired Dutch politician of the Christian Democratic Appeal (CDA) party and businessman.

Ruding worked as student researcher at the Erasmus University Rotterdam from June 1964 until July 1969 and worked as a civil servant for the Ministry of Finance from February 1965 until June 1971 and as Deputy Director-General of the department for International Monetary Affairs from February 1965 until September 1966 and Director-General of the Department for International Monetary Affairs from September 1966 until June 1971. Ruding worked as an investment banker for the AMRO Bank from June 1971 until January 1977. In December 1976 Ruding was nominated as an Executive Director of the International Monetary Fund (IMF), taking office on 1 January 1977. In December 1980 Ruding was nominated as CFO and Vice Chairman of the Board of directors of the AMRO Bank, he resigned as Executive Director of the International Monetary Fund on 31 December 1980 and was installed as CFO and Vice Chairman of the AMRO Bank on 1 January 1981.

After the election of 1982 Ruding was appointed as Minister of Finance in the Cabinet Lubbers I, taking office on 4 November 1982. Ruding was elected as a Member of the House of Representatives after the election of 1986, taking office on 3 June 1986. Following the cabinet formation of 1986 Ruding continued as minister of finance in the Cabinet Lubbers II, taking office on 14 July 1986. On 3 May 1989 the Cabinet Lubbers II fell and continued to serve in a demissionary capacity. In July 1989 Ruding announced that he would not stand for the election of 1989. The Cabinet Lubbers II was replaced by the Cabinet Lubbers III on 7 November 1989. Ruding retired from active politics and returned to the private sector and public sector, in December 1989 Ruding was nominated as a Chairman of the Christian Employers' association (NCW), taking office on 1 January 1990. In February 1992 Ruding was nominated as Vice Chairman of the Board of directors of Citigroup, he resigned as Chairman of the Christian Employers' association on 21 March 1992 the same day he was installed as Vice Chairman of the Board of directors of Citigroup. In December 1999 Ruding was appointed as COO of Citibank Europe, serving from 1 January 2000 until 1 October 2003.

Following his retirement Ruding remains active in the private sector and public sector and continues to occupy numerous seats as a corporate director and nonprofit director on several supervisory boards (Centre for European Policy Studies, Society for Statistics and Operations Research, NIBC Bank, International Statistical Institute and the Tinbergen Institute).

== Decorations ==
Honours
Ribbon bar	Honour	Country	Date	Comment
	Grand Officer of the Order of the Oak Crown	Luxembourg	15 November 1983	
	Grand Officer of the Order of the Crown	Belgium	4 April 1984	
	Knight of the Order of the Holy Sepulchre	Holy See	10 December 1985	
	Knight Commander of the Order of Merit	Germany	21 March 1986	
	Commander of the Legion of Honour	France	7 February 1987	
	Commander of the Order of Orange-Nassau	Netherlands	20 November 1989	
	Knight Grand Cross of the Order of Merit	Italy	18 July 1994	
	Knight of the Order of the Netherlands Lion	Netherlands	1 October 2004	

Political offices
Preceded by Fons van der Stee	Minister of Finance; 1982–1989	Succeeded by Wim Kok
Civic offices
Unknown	Deputy Director-General of the Department for International Monetary Affairs of the Ministry of Finance; 1965–1966	Unknown
Unknown	Director-General of the Department for International Monetary Affairs of the Ministry of Finance; 1966–1967	Unknown
Diplomatic posts
Unknown	Executive Director for Benelux, Israel and Eastern Europe of the International Monetary Fund; 1977–1980	Unknown
Business positions
Unknown	CFO and Vice Chairman of the Board of directors of the AMRO Bank; 1981–1982	Unknown
Preceded by Koos Andriessen	Chairman of the Christian Employers' association 1990–1992	Unknown
Unknown	Vice Chairman of the Board of directors of Citigroup; 1992–2000	Unknown
Unknown	COO of Citibank Europe; 2000–2003	Unknown
Non-profit organization positions
Unknown	Chairman of the Supervisory board of the Centre for European; Policy Studies; 2003–present	Incumbent
