= Tjibbe Joustra =

Dutch civil servant

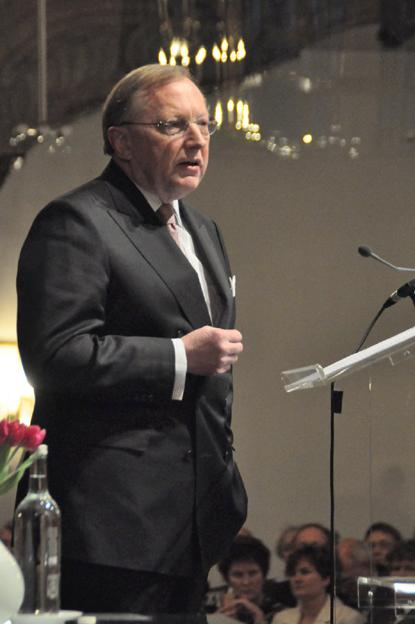
- Joustra being appointed head of the Dutch Safety Board, 2011

Tjibbe Herman Jan Joustra (born 6 February 1951) is a Dutch civil servant. He is chairman of the Association of Private Security Organizations and Detective Agencies (Dutch: Vereniging Particuliere Beveiligingsorganisaties en recherchebureaus (VPB)) and of the horticultural association (Dutch: Productschap Tuinbouw). He is the former chairman of the board of the UWV and the former National Antiterrorism Coordinator. Joustra is a former member of the party D66, but he helped write the election program of the VVD for the 2010 House of Representatives election.

== Career ==
Joustra was born in Hengelo and studied law at the University of Groningen. He graduated in 1975, on a thesis on United States antitrust law. He then joined the Ministry of Agriculture, Nature and Food Quality legal department. In 1987 he was made secretary-general of the ministry, becoming the youngest secretary general of a Dutch ministry ever (aged 35). He remained in this post until December 2001, serving under five different ministers.

In January 2002 Joustra was appointed chairman of the board of the UWV, the government management organization for all aspects of unemployment benefits, re-employment and so on. He ran into political difficulty though, following a renovation of the head office. The renovation cost millions and decked out the directors' quarters with gold, marble and other luxuries — and came at the same time as a reorganization of the UWV in which hundreds of employees were fired. The RTL television channel ran an exposé on the renovation which led to questions in parliament. As it seemed at the time that Joustra had misinformed Aart Jan de Geus (the ministry of Social Affairs and Employment), the minister then demanded his resignation. They finally agreed upon a severance package in March 2004 (including the agreement that Joustra would be given a new position in the public sector within a year), after which Joustra resigned per 1 April 2004.

The new position emerged on 27 April, when Joustra was appointed National Antiterrorism Coordinator. He was the first person to hold this new position, advising the Ministers of Justice and Interior on matters of terrorism prevention. He also set up a coordinating council of the principals from the intelligence agencies, customs and the Royal Marechaussee.

Joustra resigned as NCTb per January 1, 2009. He then moved on to several other (simultaneous) positions in the public sector, including the chairmanship of the Association of Private Security Organizations and Detective Agencies and the Productschap Tuinbouw.

It was announced on September 18, 2010 that Joustra will succeed Pieter van Vollenhoven as chairman of the Dutch Safety Board per 1 February 2011.

== Other positions ==
Joustra is member of the Oversight Board of Staatsbosbeheer, member of the board of the Groenfonds and a commissioner at ROI. He is also a member of the Advisory Board of the Food Valley Association.
