= Rein Welschen =

Dutch politician

Mayor of Eindhoven
- In office 1992–2003
- Preceded by: Jos van Kemenade
- Succeeded by: Alexander Sakkers

Personal details
- Born: 29 August 1941 Breda, Netherlands
- Died: 17 September 2013 (aged 72) Breda, Netherlands
- Political party: Labour Party (PvdA)

Reinier Wilhelmus "Rein" Welschen (29 August 1941 – 17 September 2013) was a Dutch politician and member of the Labour Party (PvdA).

Welschen served as an alderman of Breda from 1978 to 1987. He was a Provincial-Executive of North Brabant from 1987 to 1992. He served as the Mayor of Eindhoven from 1992 until 2003. The city experienced the bankruptcy of both the DAF Cars and the Operation Centurion at Philips during his tenure, which increased unemployment. A major crash of a Belgian Air Force C-130 Hercules also took place on 15 July 1996. In 2004 he was acting mayor of Westland.

Rein Welschen had been in declining health for several years. He died on 17 September 2013, at the age of 72. His funeral was held in Breda, while a memorial service was held Eindhoven's city hall on 27 September 2013.
