= Ralf Krewinkel =

Dutch politician

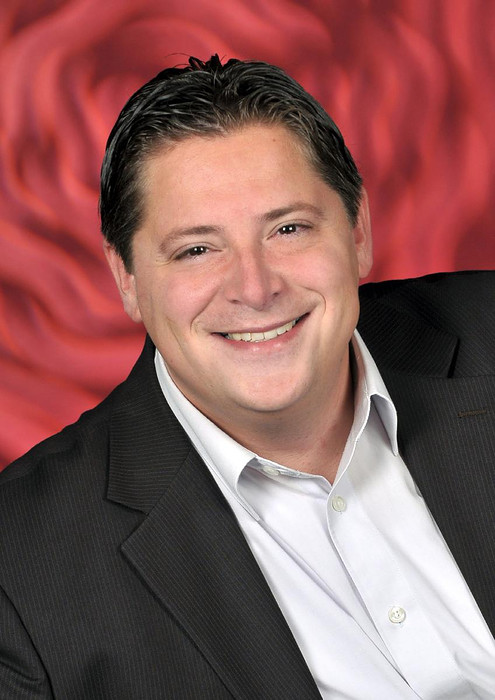
Ralf Krewinkel

Ralf Karel Hubert Krewinkel (born 12 November 1974 in Kerkrade) is a Dutch politician of the Labour Party (Partij van de Arbeid). Since 31 August 2015 he has been mayor of Heerlen.

From 1 May 2011 till summer 2015 he was mayor of the Limburg municipality Beek. Previously he was a member of the city council of Kerkrade from 1998 to 2006 and an alderman of the same municipality from 2006 till 1 May 2011.
