= Dick de Zeeuw =

Dutch politician and agronomist

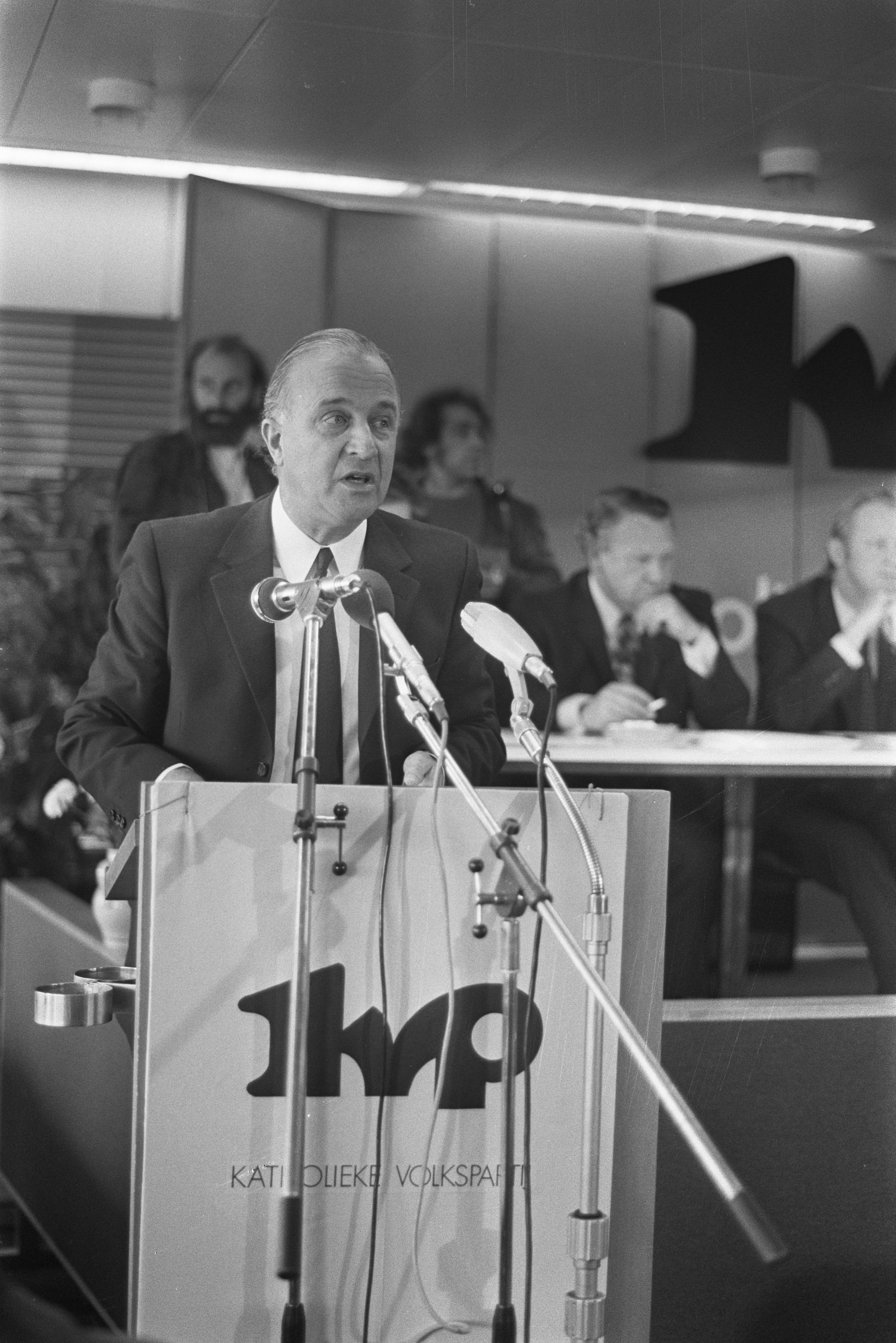
Dick de Zeeuw

Dick de Zeeuw (January 24, 1924, Tanjung Pura, Langkat, Langkat Regency – February 18, 2009, Bangkok) was a Dutch politician and agronomist.
