= William Moorlag =

Dutch politician

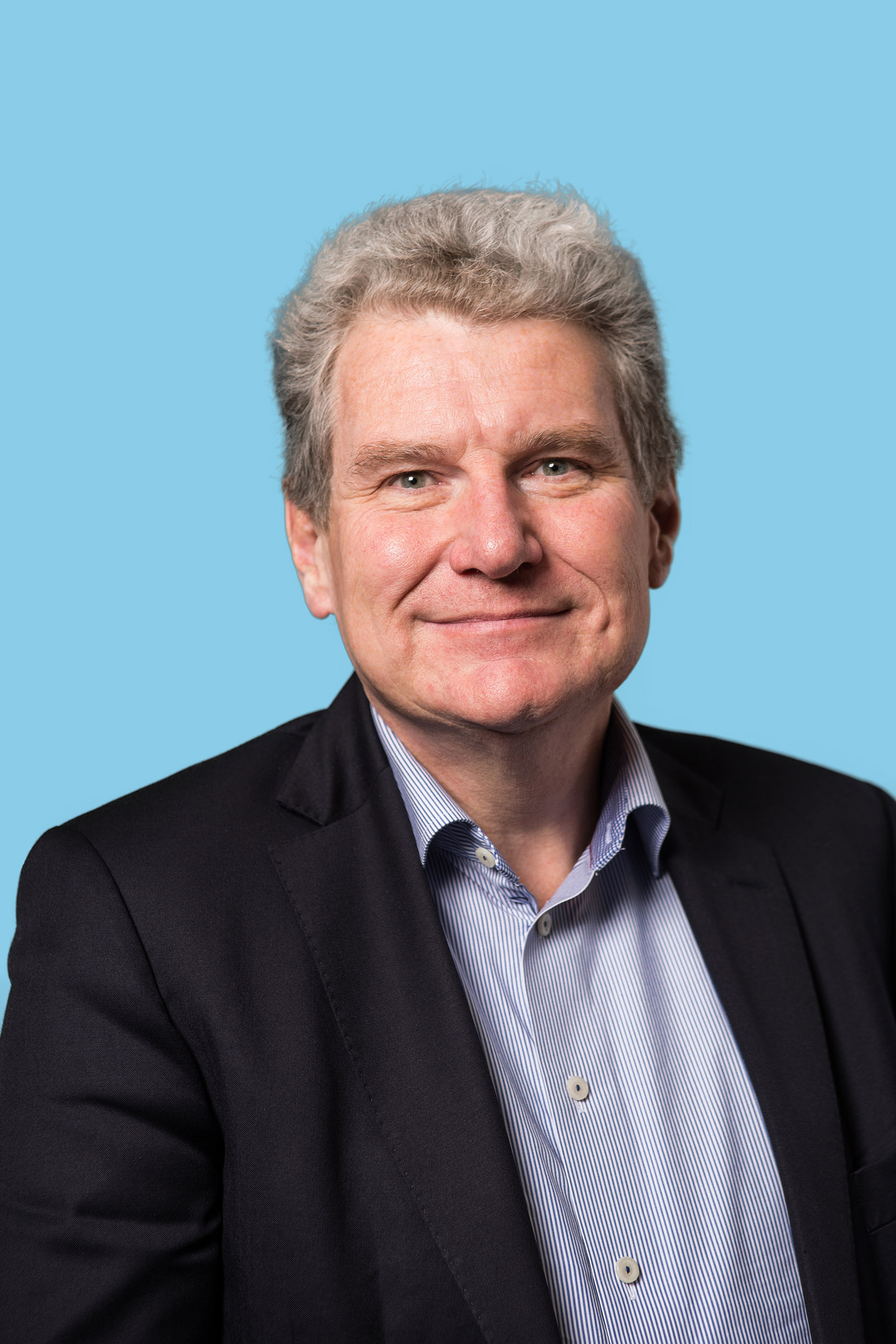
- William Moorlag in 2016

Member of the House of Representatives
- Incumbent
- Assumed office 25 October 2017

Member of the Provincial-Executive of Groningen
- In office April 2003 – 22 April 2015

Member of the States of Groningen
- In office 20 March 2003 – April 2003

Personal details
- Born: 17 April 1960 (age 65) Onderdendam, Netherlands
- Party: Labour Party

William Moorlag (born 17 April 1960) is a Dutch politician of the Labour Party. He has been a member of the House of Representatives since 25 October 2017. He was a member of the States of Groningen in 2003, member of the Provincial-Executive from 2003 to 2015.
