= 2002 Labour Party (Netherlands) leadership election =

Dutch political party leadership election

2002 Labour Party leadership election
- 17 November 2002
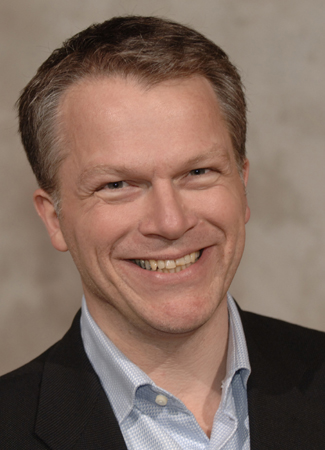

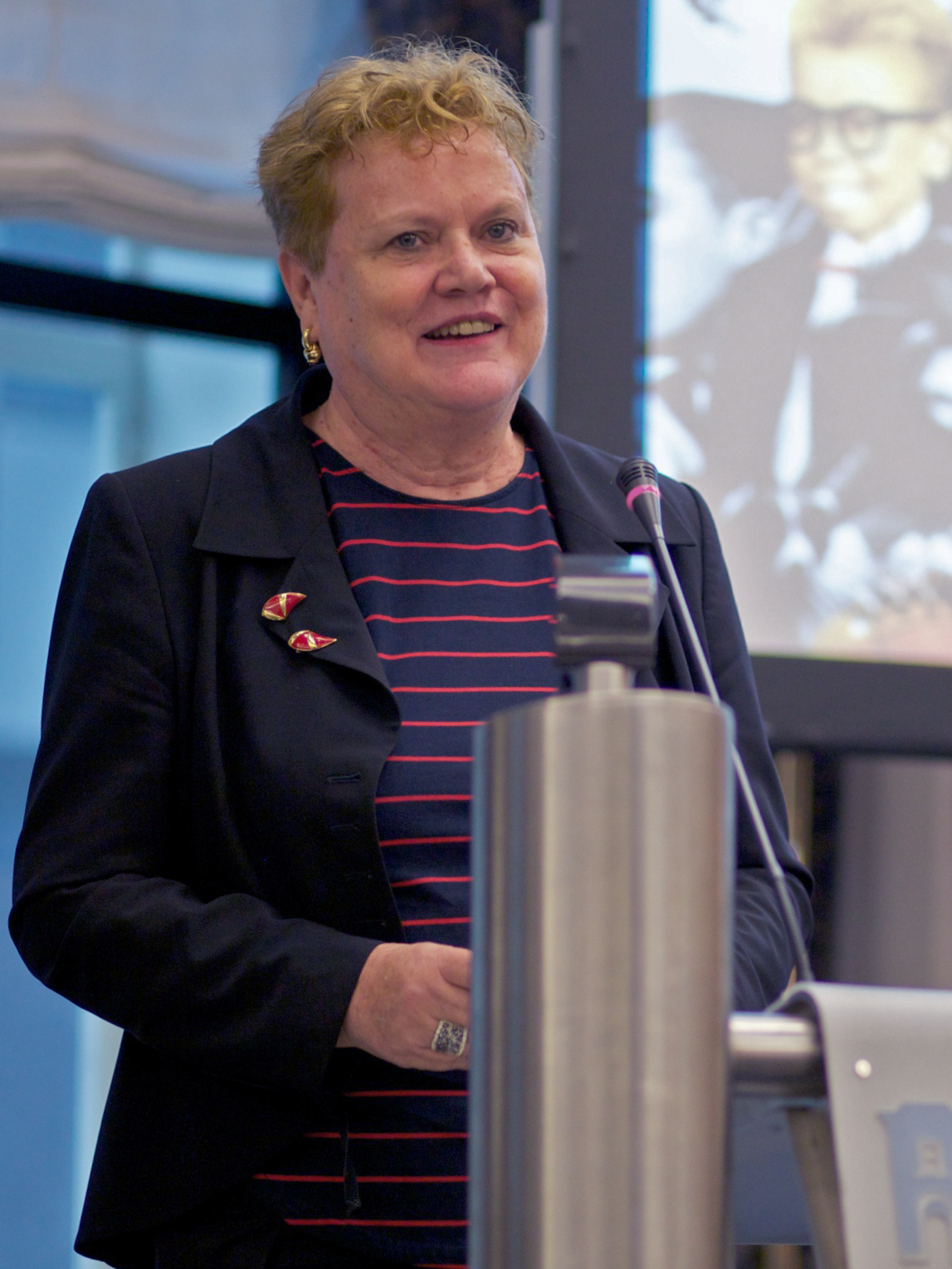

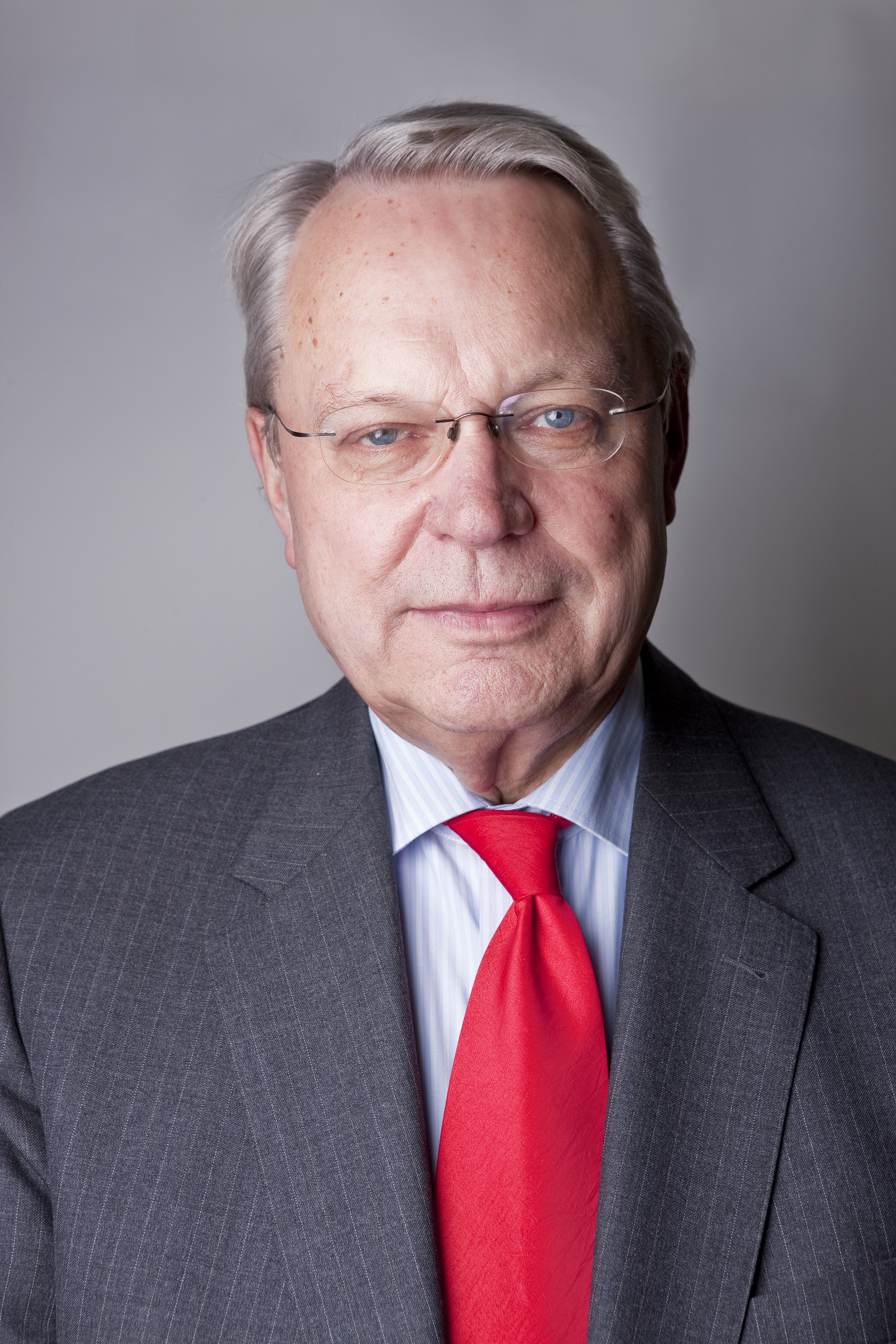

Candidate	Wouter Bos	Jeltje van Nieuwenhoven
Popular vote	19,303	10,129
Percentage	60.56%	31.78%
Candidate	Klaas de Vries	Jouke de Vries
Popular vote	1,508	935
Percentage	4.73%	2.93%
Leader before election
Ad Melkert
Leader-elect
Wouter Bos

The 2002 Labour Party leadership election was called to elect the new Leader of the Labour Party after incumbent Ad Melkert announced his retirement from national politics. Wouter Bos the former Undersecretary for Finance beat the former Speaker of the House of Representatives Jeltje van Nieuwenhoven, former Minister of the Interior and Kingdom Relations Klaas de Vries and public administration professor Jouke de Vries.

Between 6 and 12 November 2002 the 60,000 members of the Dutch social-democratic Labour Party (PvdA) could vote for their preferred candidate for top candidate for the 2003 general election.

These elections were part of the reforms implemented by party chairperson Ruud Koole, after the 2002 elections. In addition to the top candidate for the elections to the House of Representatives, the top candidate for the Senate and leaders of the provincial councils were elected. All PvdA members could vote by mail or telephone.

The candidates for the election were Wouter Bos, former State Secretary for finance, the former President of the House of Representatives, Jeltsje van Nieuwenhoven, the former Minister of Home Affairs, Klaas de Vries and the Professor of public administration Jouke de Vries. The first three were member of the House of Representatives, while Jouke de Vries was an outsider candidate.

Wouter Bos was the first to announce his candidacy, just after the fall of the Second Balkenende cabinet. On 29 September 2002 Klaas de Vries announced his candidacy, claiming that the elections would be a sham if only Wouter Bos was a serious candidate. On 22 October, interim party-leader Jeltsje van Nieuwenhoven finally announced her candidacy.

The elections were won by a landslide by Wouter Bos. He won with 60% of the votes and a margin of 30%. 54% of the PvdA members voted.

Following the elections the PvdA made miraculous resurgence in the 2003 general elections, nearly doubling its seats and votes, this is partially credited to the charisma of Wouter Bos and the reform of the party under Ruud Koole

Candidate	Born	Position(s) at that time	Former position(s)
Wouter Bos	14 July 1963 (age 39)	Member of the House of Representatives (since 2002)	Member of the House of Representatives (1998–2000); State Secretary for Finance (2000–2002)
Jeltje van Nieuwenhoven	2 August 1943 (age 59)	Parliamentary leader in the House of Representatives (since 2002); Member of the House of Representatives (since 1983)	Member of the House of Representatives (1981–1983); Speaker of the House of Representatives (1998–2002)
Klaas de Vries	28 April 1943 (age 59)	Member of the House of Representatives (since 2002)	Member of the House of Representatives (1973–1988); Chairman of the Social and Economic Council (1996–1998); Minister of Social Affairs and Employment (1998–2000); Minister of the Interior and Kingdom Relations (2000–2002)
Jouke de Vries	26 September 1960 (age 42)		
