= Klaas de Vries (Labour Party) =

Dutch politician (born 1943)

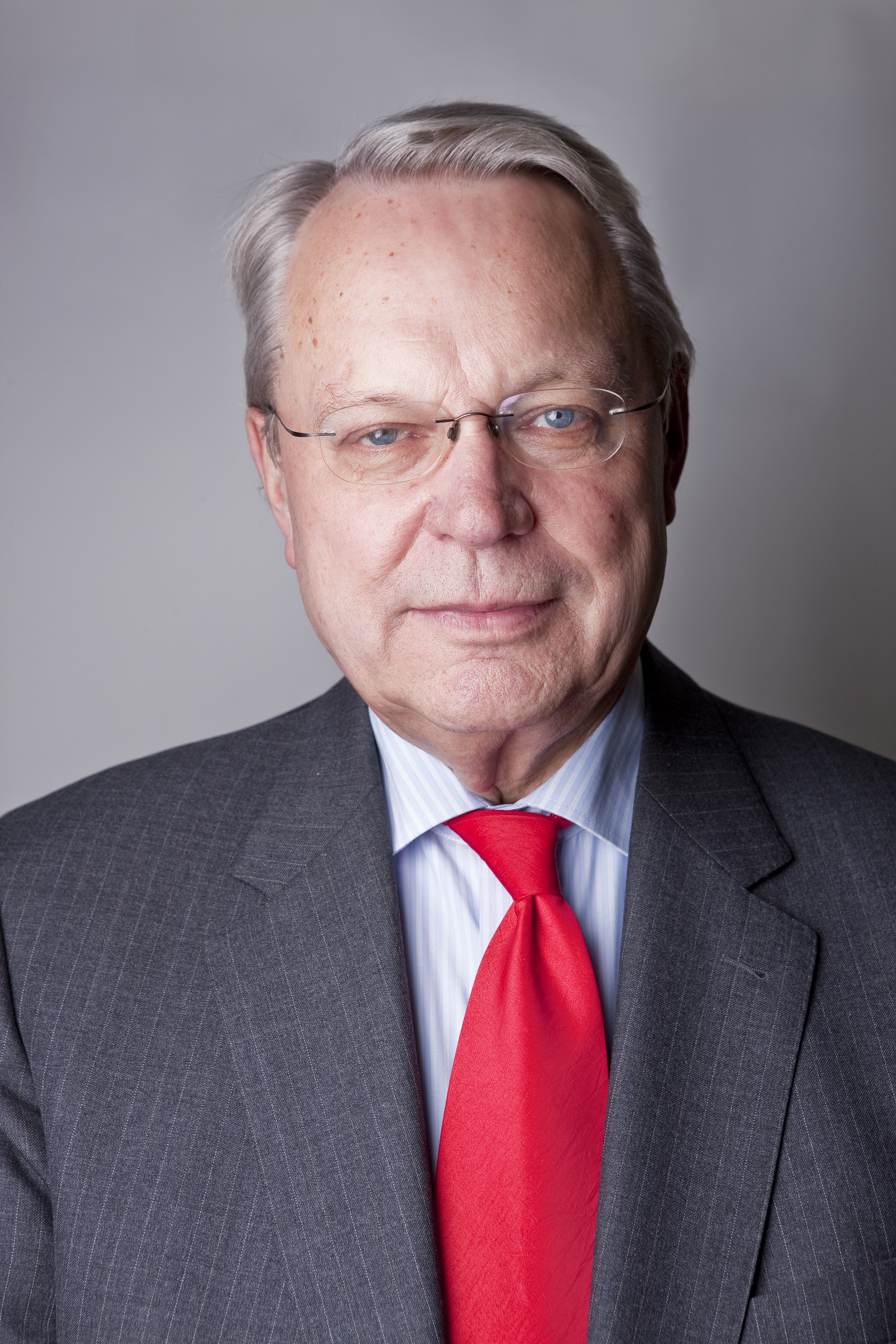
- De Vries in 2008

Member of the Senate
- In office 12 June 2007 – 9 June 2015

Minister of the Interior and Kingdom Relations
- In office 24 March 2000 – 22 July 2002
- Prime Minister: Wim Kok
- Preceded by: Roger van Boxtel (ad interim)
- Succeeded by: Johan Remkes

Minister of Agriculture, Nature and Fisheries
- In office 7 June 1999 – 9 June 1999 ad interim
- Prime Minister: Wim Kok
- Preceded by: Haijo Apotheker
- Succeeded by: Laurens Jan Brinkhorst

Minister of Social Affairs and Employment
- In office 3 August 1998 – 24 March 2000
- Prime Minister: Wim Kok
- Preceded by: Ad Melkert
- Succeeded by: Willem Vermeend

Chairman of the Social and Economic Council
- In office 1 January 1996 – 3 August 1998
- Preceded by: Theo Quené
- Succeeded by: Herman Wijffels

Member of the House of Representatives
- In office 23 May 2002 – 30 November 2006
- In office 28 May 1973 – 1 September 1988

Personal details
- Born: Klaas George de Vries; 28 April 1943 (age 83) Hoensbroek, Netherlands
- Party: Labour Party (from 1968)
- Spouse: Nanda Stapper (m. 1966)
- Children: 3 sons
- Education: Hamline University (Bachelor of Arts); Utrecht University (Bachelor of Laws, Master of Laws)
- Occupation: Politician · Civil servant · Jurist · Researcher · Nonprofit director · Sport administrator · Lobbyist · Activist · Author · Professor
- Website: Klaasdevries.nl (in Dutch)

Klaas George de Vries (born 28 April 1943) is a retired Dutch politician of the Labour Party (PvdA) and jurist.

De Vries attended a gymnasium in Heerlen from June 1955 until July 1961 and applied at the Hamline University in Saint Paul, Minnesota in July 1961 majoring in Public Administration and obtaining a Bachelor of Public Administration degree in August 1962 before transferring to the Utrecht University in September 1962 majoring in Law and obtaining a Bachelor of Laws degree in June 1964 and graduating with a Master of Laws degree in July 1968. De Vries worked as a civil servant for the department for Administrative Affairs of the Ministry of Justice from August 1968 until April 1971 and as a researcher at the Erasmus University Rotterdam from April 1971 until May 1973. De Vries served on the Municipal Council of Delft from March 1970 until April 1974.

De Vries became a member of the House of Representatives after Bram Stemerdink was appointed as State Secretary for Defence in the Den Uyl cabinet after the 1972 general election, taking office on taking office on 28 May 1973 serving as a frontbencher and spokesperson for defence and chairing the parliamentary inquiry commission on construction grants. In August 1988 De Vries was nominated as Executive-Director of the Association of Municipalities, he resigned as a member of the House of Representatives the same day he was installed as Executive-Director on 1 September 1988. In December 1995 De Vries was nominated as chairman of the Social and Economic Council, he resigned as Executive-Director the same day he was installed as Chairman, taking office on 1 January 1996. After the 1998 general election De Vries was appointed as Minister of Social Affairs and Employment in the Kok II cabinet, taking office on 3 August 1998. De Vries served as acting Minister of Agriculture, Nature and Fisheries from 7 June 1999 until 9 June 1999 following the resignation of Haijo Apotheker. De Vries was appointed as Minister of the Interior and Kingdom Relations following the resignation of Bram Peper, taking office on 24 March 2000. After the 2002 general election De Vries returned to the House of Representatives, taking office on 23 May 2002. The Kok II cabinet was replaced by the Balkenende I cabinet following the cabinet formation of 2002 on 22 July 2002 serving as a frontbencher and spokesperson for integration. After the Leader of the Labour Party and parliamentary leader in the House of Representatives Ad Melkert announced that he was stepping down following the defeat in the election, De Vries announced his candidacy to succeed him. De Vries lost the leadership election to former State Secretary for Finance Wouter Bos on 12 November 2002. In July 2006 De Vries announced that he would not stand for the 2006 general election and continued to serve until the end of the parliamentary term on 30 November 2006.

De Vries remained in active in national politics, he was elected to the Senate after the 2007 Senate election, taking office on 12 June 2007 serving as a frontbencher and spokesperson for foreign affairs and chairing several parliamentary committees. De Vries also became active in the public sector and occupied numerous seats as a nonprofit director on several boards of directors and supervisory boards (Humanist Association, Parliamentary Documentation Center, Transnational Institute, International Fellowship of Reconciliation, Atlantic Association, Institute for Multiparty Democracy, ProDemos and the International Institute of Social History) and served on several state commissions and councils on behalf of the government (Council for Public Administration, Cadastre Agency, Advisory Council for Spatial Planning and Public Pension Funds APB) and as an advocate, lobbyist and activist for the Anti-war movement, Humanitarianism and Democracy. De Vries also worked as a sport administrator for the Olympic Committee*Dutch Sports Federation (NOC*NSF) and also served as a distinguished professor of Governmental Studies, Public administration and Political history at the Radboud University Nijmegen from 1 June 2009 until 10 October 2012. In November 2014 De Vries announced his retirement from national politics and that he would not stand for the 2015 Senate election and continued to serve until the end of the parliamentary term on 9 June 2015.

De Vries is known for his abilities as a debater and manager. De Vries continues to comment on political affairs as of 2026.

== Decorations ==
Honours
Ribbon bar	Honour	Country	Date	Comment
	Knight of the Order of the Netherlands Lion	Netherlands	30 April 1986	
	Grand Officer of the Order of Leopold II	Belgium	12 May 1999	
	Knight Commander of the Order of Merit	Germany	1 February 2001	
	Grand Officer of the Order of Orange-Nassau	Netherlands	9 June 2015	Elevated from Officer (10 December 2002)

Political offices
Preceded by Ad Melkert	Minister of Social Affairs and Employment; 1998–2000	Succeeded by Willem Vermeend
Preceded by Haijo Apotheker	Minister of Agriculture, Nature and Fisheries; Ad interim 1999	Succeeded by Laurens Jan Brinkhorst
Preceded by Roger van Boxtel; Ad interim	Minister of the Interior and Kingdom Relations; 2000–2002	Succeeded by Johan Remkes
Civic offices
Preceded by Theo Quené	Chairman of the Social and Economic Council; 1996–1998	Succeeded by Herman Wijffels
Non-profit organization positions
Unknown	Executive Director of the Association of Municipalities; 1988–1996	Unknown
