= Roger van Boxtel =

Dutch politician (born 1954)

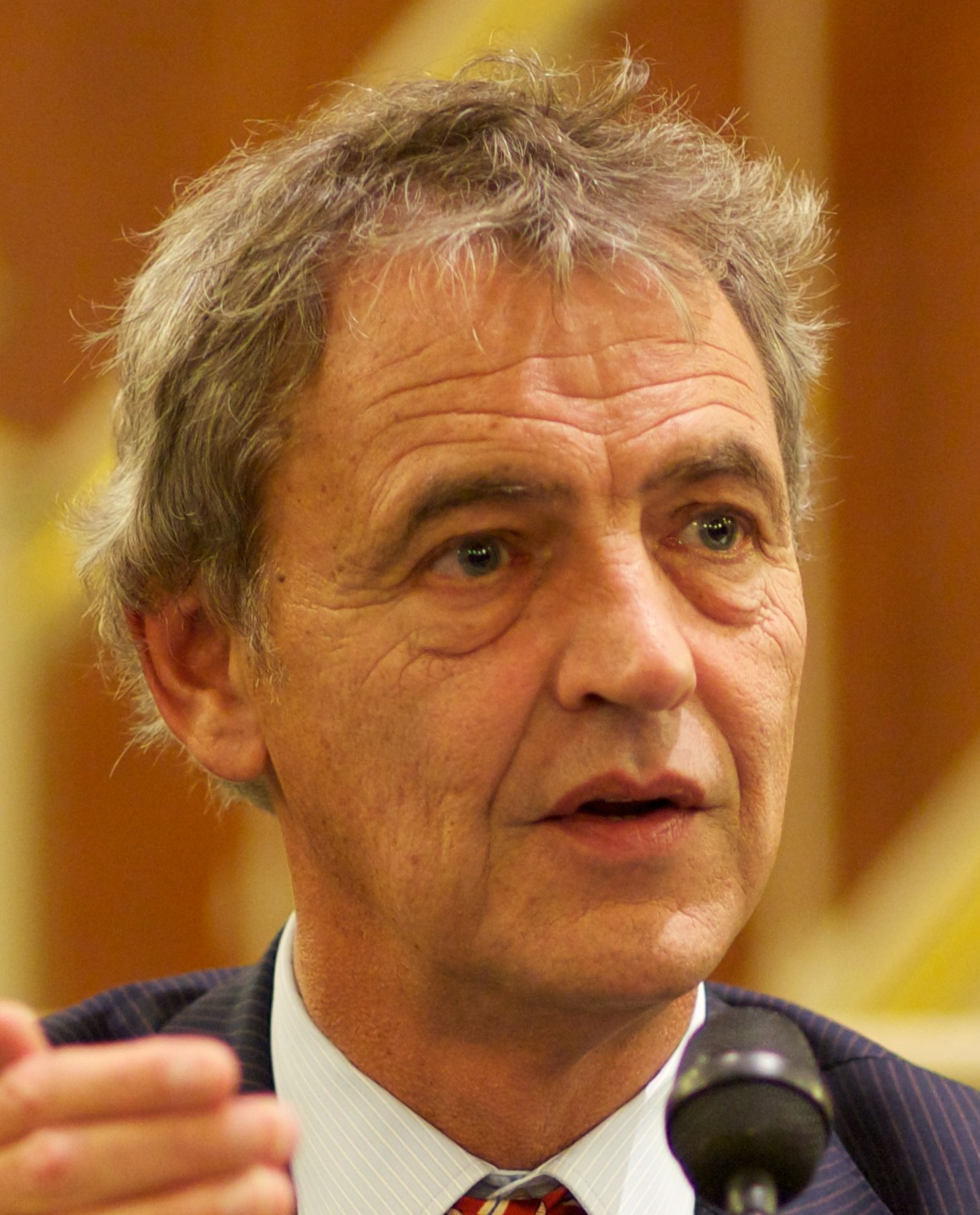
- Roger van Boxtel in 2010

Member of the Social and Economic Council
- In office 30 January 2014 – 1 February 2018
- Chair: See list: Wiebe Draijer (2014) Mariëtte Hamer (2014–2018)

Parliamentary leader in the Senate
- In office 7 June 2011 – 9 June 2015
- Preceded by: Hans Engels
- Succeeded by: Thom de Graaf
- Parliamentary group: Democrats 66

Member of the Senate
- In office 7 June 2011 – 9 June 2015
- Parliamentary group: Democrats 66

Minister of the Interior and Kingdom Relations
- In office 13 March 2000 – 24 March 2000; Ad interim
- Prime Minister: Wim Kok
- Preceded by: Bram Peper
- Succeeded by: Klaas de Vries

Minister for Integration and Urban Planning
- In office 3 August 1998 – 22 July 2002
- Prime Minister: Wim Kok
- Preceded by: Office established
- Succeeded by: Office discontinued

Member of the House of Representatives
- In office 30 August 1994 – 3 August 1998
- Parliamentary group: Democrats 66

Personal details
- Born: Roger Henri Ludovic Maria van Boxtel; 8 February 1954 (age 72) Tilburg, Netherlands
- Party: Democrats 66 (since 1977)
- Spouse: Judith van Emmerik (m. 1988)
- Children: 2 sons
- Education: University of Amsterdam (Bachelor of Medical Sciences, Bachelor of Laws, Master of Laws)
- Occupation: Politician · civil servant · Jurist · Management consultant · Businessman · Corporate director · Nonprofit director · Trade association executive · Media administrator · Sport administrator

Roger Henri Ludovic Maria van Boxtel (born 8 February 1954) is a retired Dutch politician of the Democrats 66 (D66) party and businessman.

Van Boxtel attended a Keizer Karel Gymnasium in Amstelveen from April 1966 until May 1973 and applied at the University of Amsterdam in June 1973 majoring in Medicine and obtaining a Bachelor of Medical Sciences degree in June 1975 before switching to Law and obtaining a Bachelor of Laws degree in May 1977 before graduating with a Master of Laws degree in July 1981. Van Boxtel worked as management consultant and legal advisor for the Municipalities association (VNG) from August 1981 until February 1986 and a civil servant for the Immigration and Naturalisation Service (IND) of the Ministry of Justice from February 1986 until August 1994.

Van Boxtel became a Member of the House of Representatives after Jacob Kohnstamm was appointed as State Secretary for the Interior in the Cabinet Kok I after the election of 1994, taking office on 30 August 1994 serving as a frontbencher and the de facto Whip and spokesperson for Health, Social Work, Minorities, Welfare and deputy spokesperson for Housing and Spatial Planning, Kingdom Relations and Abortion. After the election of 1998 the new Leader of the Democrats 66 Els Borst opted to remain Minister of Health, Welfare and Sport in the Cabinet Kok II and unexpectedly announced that she was stepping down as Leader, Van Boxtel announced his candidacy to succeed her. Van Boxtel lost the leadership election to Parliamentary leader Thom de Graaf on 30 May 1998. Following the cabinet formation of 1998 Van Boxtel was appointed as Minister for Integration and Urban Planning in the Cabinet Kok II, taking office on 3 August 1998. Van Boxtel served as acting Minister of the Interior and Kingdom Relations from 13 March 2000 until 24 March 2000 following the resignation of Bram Peper. After the election of 2002 Van Boxtel was re-elected to the House of Representatives but resigned his seat before the installation and announced his retirement from national politics, the Cabinet Kok II was replaced by the Cabinet Balkenende I on 22 July 2002.

Van Boxtel semi-retired from national politics and became active in the private sector and public sector and occupied numerous seats as a corporate director and nonprofit director on several boards of directors and supervisory boards (AkzoNobel, Humanist Association and the International Union for Conservation of Nature). In May 2003 Van Boxtel was named as chief executive officer (CEO) of insurance company Menzis and in August 2004 he was also named as chairman of the board of directors. Van Boxtel also worked as a trade association executive for the Zorgverzekeraars Nederland (ZN) serving as Vice Chairman of the executive board from 20 January 2014 until 30 May 2015 and the Industry and Employers confederation (VNO-NCW) and as a media administrator for the public broadcaster Dutch Program Foundation (NPS) serving as chairman of the supervisory board from 1 January 2004 until 1 August 2008 and as a sport administrator for Professional footballclub AFC Ajax serving as Technical director from 1 November 2011 until 30 January 2012. Van Boxtel was elected as a Member of the Senate after the Senate election of 2011 and was selected as Parliamentary leader of the Democrats 66 in the Senate, taking office on 7 June 2011. In September 2014 Van Boxtel announced his retirement from national politics and that he wouldn't stand for the Senate election of 2015 and continued to serve until the end of the parliamentary term on 9 June 2015.

Van Boxtel retired after spending 21 years in national politics but remained active in the private sector and public sector and continued to occupy numerous seats as a corporate director and nonprofit director on several boards of directors and supervisory boards (Meteorological Institute, VU University Medical Center, Institute for Multiparty Democracy, J.C. Bloem-poëzieprijs and Museum de Fundatie) and serves on several state commissions and councils on behalf of the government (Netherlands Film Fund, Public Pension Funds APB and the Social and Economic Council). In July 2015 Van Boxtel was named as chief executive officer and chairman of the Board of directors of the state-owned passenger railway operator Nederlandse Spoorwegen (NS)., a role in which he served until 30 September 2020, when he was succeeded by Marjan Rintel.

== Decorations ==
Honours
Ribbon bar	Honour	Country	Date	Comment
	Officer of the Order of Orange-Nassau	Netherlands	10 December 2002	

Party political offices
Preceded by Hans Engels	Parliamentary leader of the Democrats 66 in the Senate; 2011–2015	Succeeded by Thom de Graaf
Political offices
Preceded by Office established	Minister for Integration and Urban Planning; 1998–2002	Succeeded by Office discontinued
Preceded by Bram Peper	Minister of the Interior and Kingdom Relations; Ad interim 2000	Succeeded by Klaas de Vries
Business positions
Unknown	CEO and Chairman of the Board of directors of Menzis; 2004–2015	Succeeded by Ruben Wenselaar
Unknown	Vice Chairman of the Executive Board of the Healthcare Insurance association 2014–2005	Succeeded by Jean-Paul van Haarlem
Preceded by Timo Huges	CEO and Chairman of the Board of directors of the Nederlandse Spoorwegen; 2015–present	Incumbent
Non-profit organization positions
Preceded by Frits van Vugt	Chairman of the Supervisory board of the Humanist Association; 2003–2005	Succeeded by Rein Zunderdorp
Unknown	Chairman of the Supervisory board of the International Union for Conservation of Nature Netherlands; 2008–2010	Unknown
Unknown	Chairman of the Supervisory board of the Museum de Fundatie; 2015–present	Incumbent
Media offices
Unknown	Chairman of the Supervisory board of the Dutch Program Foundation; 2004–2008	Unknown
Sporting positions
Preceded by Martin van Geel; 2008	Technical director of AFC Ajax; Ad interim 2011–2012	Succeeded by Danny Blind
