= Joop van der Reijden =

Dutch politician

His Excellency Joop van der Reijden
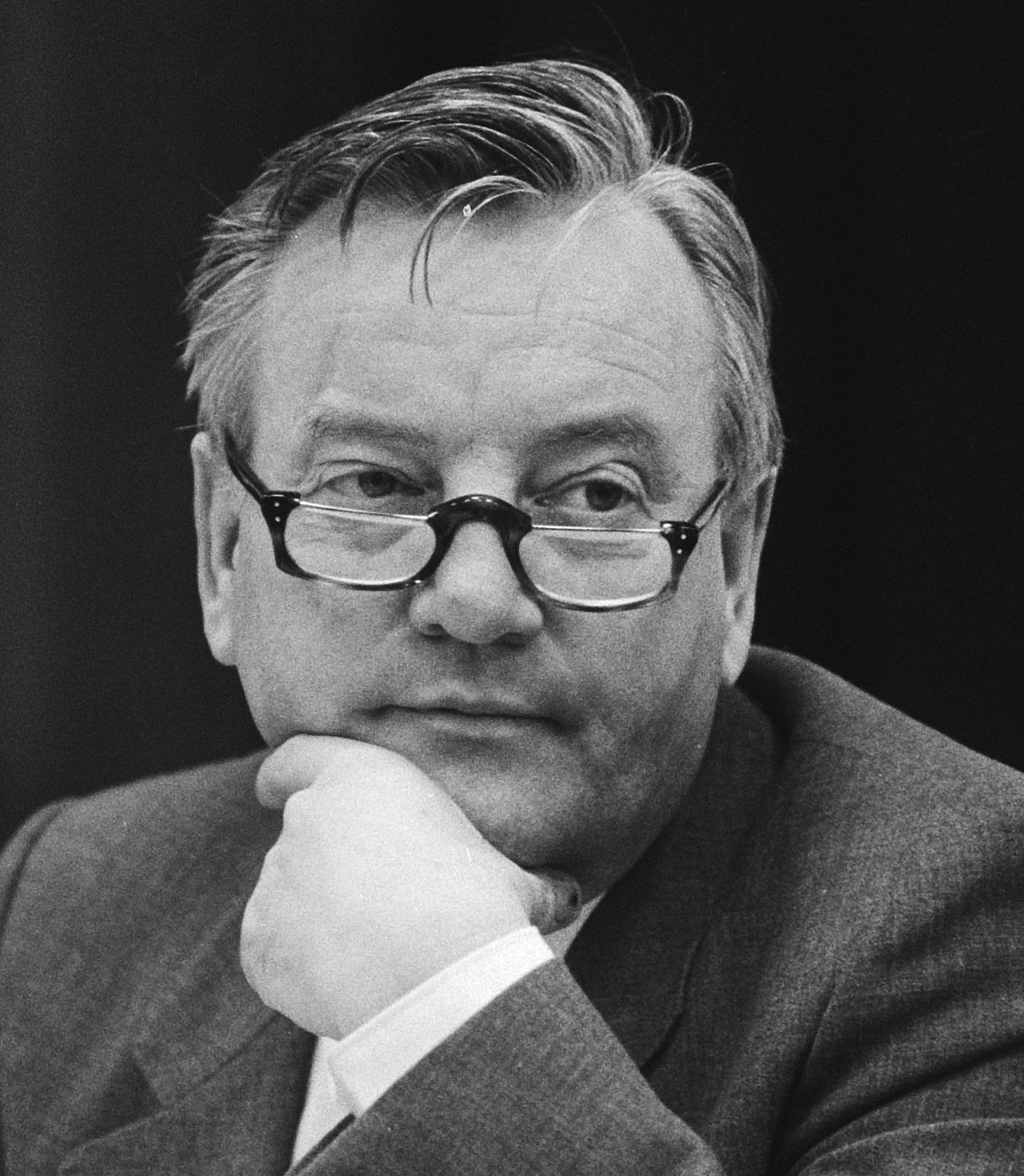
- Joop van der Reijden in 1983

Mayor of Valkenburg
- In office 1 January 2001 – 1 January 2006; Ad interim
- Preceded by: An Hommes
- Succeeded by: Jos Wienen as Mayor of Katwijk

President of the Dutch Olympic Committee*Dutch Sports Federation
- In office 27 January 1989 – 1 March 1990; Ad interim
- Preceded by: Henk Vonhoff
- Succeeded by: Wouter Huibregtsen

State Secretary for Welfare, Health and Culture
- In office 5 November 1982 – 14 July 1986
- Prime Minister: Ruud Lubbers
- Preceded by: Ineke Lambers-Hacquebard as State Secretary for Health and Environment
- Succeeded by: Dick Dees

Personal details
- Born: Johannes Piet van der Reijden; 7 January 1927 Leiden, Netherlands
- Died: 3 February 2006 (aged 79) Nieuwegein, Netherlands
- Party: Christian Democratic Appeal (from 1980)
- Other political affiliations: Christian Historical Union (1963–1980)
- Education: Erasmus University Rotterdam (Bachelor of Economics)
- Occupation: Politician · Economist · Businessman · Corporate director · Nonprofit director · Media administrator · Sport administrator · Hospital administrator

Johannes Piet "Joop" van der Reijden (7 January 1927 – 3 February 2006) was a Dutch politician of the Christian Democratic Appeal (CDA) and businessman.

== Decorations ==
Honours
Ribbon bar	Honour	Country	Date	Comment
	Officer of the Order of Orange-Nassau	Netherlands	30 April 1982	
	Knight of the Order of the Netherlands Lion	Netherlands	26 August 1986	

Political offices
Preceded by Ineke Lambers-Hacquebard as State Secretary for Health and Environment	State Secretary for Welfare, Health and Culture; 1982–1986	Succeeded by Dick Dees
Preceded by An Hommes	Mayor of Valkenburg; Ad interim 2001–2006	Succeeded by Jos Wienen as Mayor of Katwijk
Media offices
Preceded by Pieter van Dijke	Chairman of the Dutch Broadcast Foundation; 1987–1990	Succeeded by Pieter van Dijke; Ad interim
Preceded by Wouter Bordewijk	Chairman of the Veronica Broadcasting Association; 1990–2001	Succeeded by Office discontinued
Sporting positions
Preceded by Henk Vonhoff	President of the Dutch Olympic; Committee*Dutch Sports Federation; Ad interim 1989–1990	Succeeded by Wouter Huibregtsen
