= Bram Peper =

Dutch politician (1940–2022)

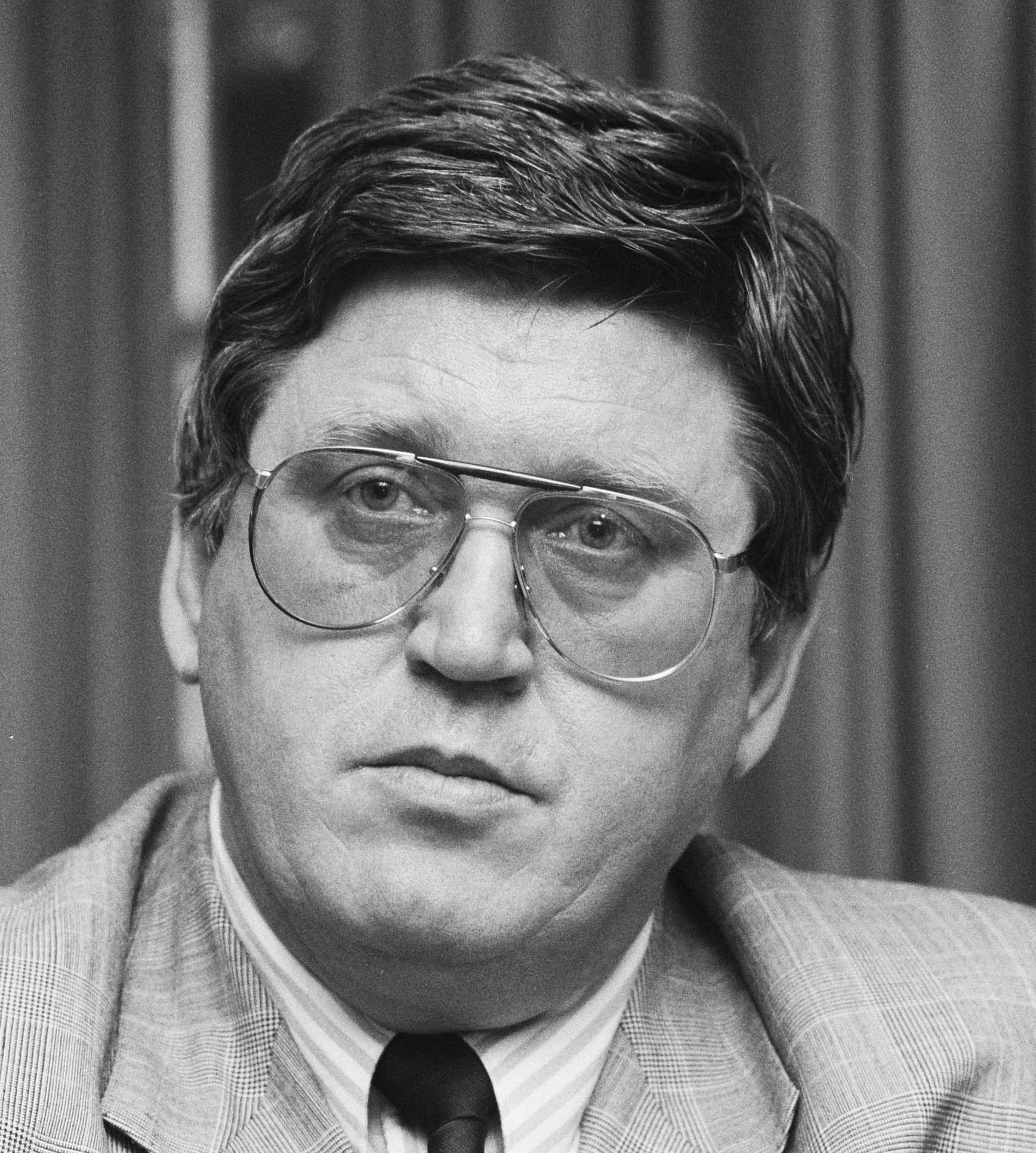
- Peper in 1989

Minister of the Interior and Kingdom Relations
- In office 3 August 1998 – 13 March 2000
- Prime Minister: Wim Kok
- Preceded by: Hans Dijkstal (Note: As Minister of the Interior); Joris Voorhoeve (Note: As Minister for Netherlands Antilles and Aruba Affairs)
- Succeeded by: Roger van Boxtel (ad interim)

Mayor of Rotterdam
- In office 16 March 1982 – 3 August 1998
- Preceded by: Hans Mentink (ad interim)
- Succeeded by: Hans Simons (ad interim)

Personal details
- Born: Abraham Peper; 13 February 1940 Haarlem, Netherlands
- Died: 20 August 2022 (aged 82) Rotterdam, Netherlands
- Party: Labour Party (from 1966)
- Spouse: Neelie Kroes (m. 1991; div. 2003)
- Children: 4
- Education: University of Amsterdam (BSS, MSS); University of Oslo (BEc, MEc); Erasmus University Rotterdam (PhD)
- Occupation: Politician; sociologist

Abraham "Bram" Peper (13 February 1940 – 20 August 2022) was a Dutch politician of the Labour Party (PvdA).

== Early life ==
After finishing the Hogere Burgerschool, Peper studied social sciences at the University of Amsterdam until 1965, and economy and sociology at the University of Oslo (1963–1964) and got his PhD at the Nederlandse Economische Hogeschool (Currently Erasmus University Rotterdam) in 1972.

== Career ==
Peper became a researcher, and fulfilled several academic functions, including professor at the Erasmus University until he became Mayor of Rotterdam in 1982 at the age of 42. Rotterdam is the second largest city of the Netherlands, and Peper was one of the youngest mayors of a large city at the time.

In 1984, an interview with Peper and his wife with Ischa Meijer was published in Vrij Nederland, a Dutch magazine, in which Peper was critical of citizens and rulers. The interview was perceived as arrogant, and seemed to be made while Peper was in a drunk condition. Peper made his apologies, and soon after he and his wife divorced.

While Peper was mayor, the city completed its process of rebuilding after World War II, which resulted in a new skyline for Rotterdam. In the second half of his mayorship, Peper had a tough time with for instance his defeat on the formation of a city province (90% of the voters in a referendum were against). Peper was mayor until 1998, when he joined the government as Minister of the Interior of the Netherlands in the second Kok cabinet.

Starting in 1999, rumours were spreading that Peper had made incorrect declarations while he was mayor of Rotterdam. On 13 March 2000 Peper resigned as minister, according to himself to no longer bring problems to the public government, and to be better able to defend himself. Although a report on 17 March suggested that Peper did not act properly regarding the declarations, Peper won the legal procedures finally two years later.

== Later life and death ==
From 2002 to 2004, Peper was professor at the Nyenrode Business University, a private university, from which he resigned due to a disagreement regarding a study trip to the European Union in Brussels.

Peper died on 20 August 2022, at the age of 82.

== Decorations ==
Honours
Ribbon bar	Honour	Country	Date	Comment
	Officer of the Order of Orange-Nassau	Netherlands	30 April 2003	

== Notes ==
Political offices
Preceded by Hans Mentink ad interim	Mayor of Rotterdam; 1982–1998	Succeeded by Hans Simons ad interim
Preceded by Hans Dijkstal as Minister of the Interior; Joris Voorhoeve as Minister for Netherlands; Antilles and Aruba Affairs	Minister of the Interior and Kingdom Relations; 1998–2000	Succeeded by Roger van Boxtel ad interim
