= Dick Dees =

Dutch politician (born 1944)

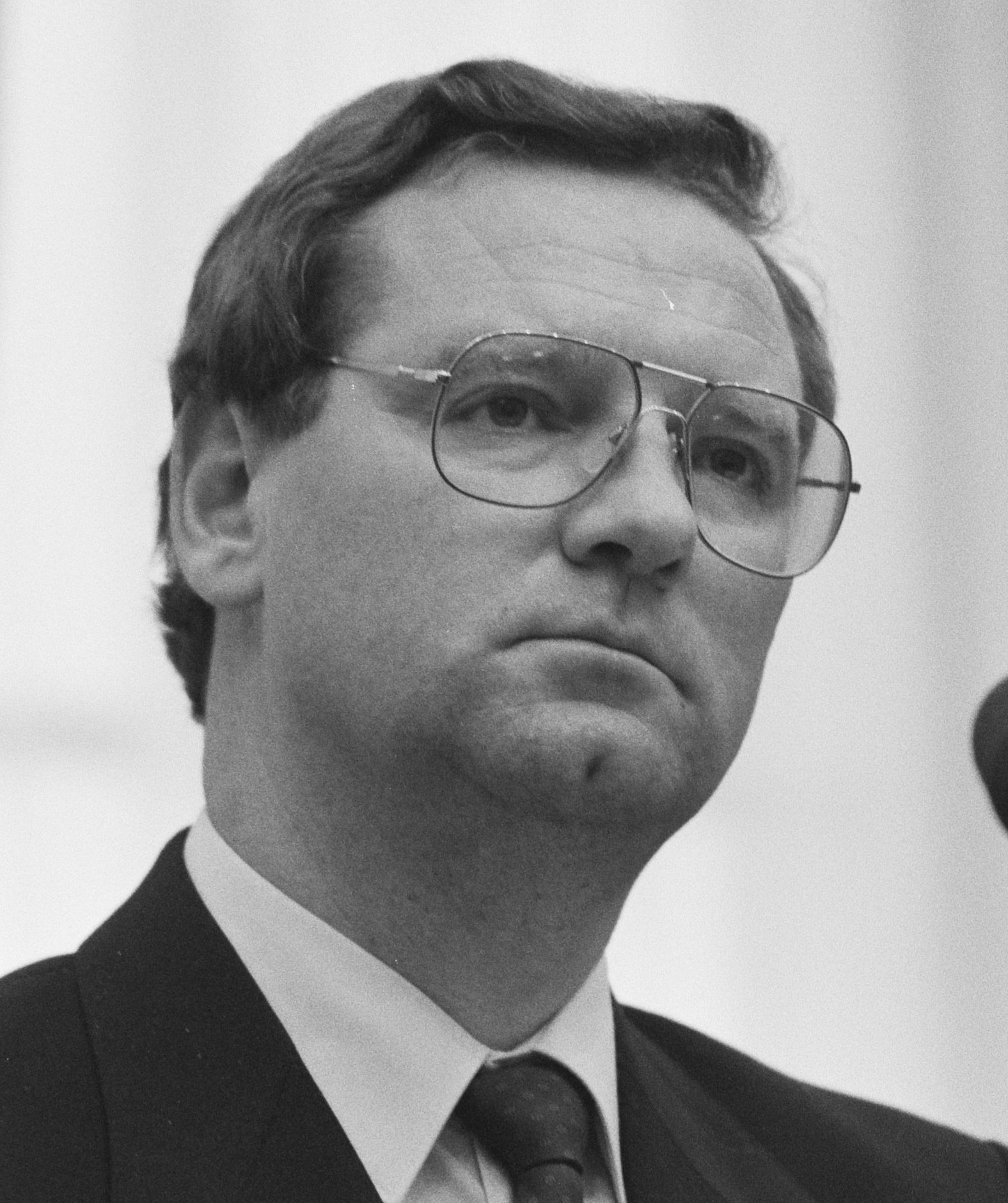
- Dees in 1988

Member of the Senate
- In office 13 June 1995 – 12 June 2007

President of the Benelux Interparliamentary Consultative Council
- In office 1 January 1993 – 1 January 1994
- Preceded by: Jean Bock
- Succeeded by: Ady Jung

State Secretary for Welfare, Health and Culture
- In office 14 July 1986 – 7 November 1989
- Prime Minister: Ruud Lubbers
- Preceded by: Joop van der Reijden
- Succeeded by: Hans Simons

Member of the House of Representatives
- In office 14 September 1989 – 13 June 1995
- In office 7 December 1972 – 14 July 1986

Personal details
- Born: Dirk Jan Dignus Dees; 13 December 1944 (age 81) Oostburg, Netherlands
- Party: People's Party for Freedom and Democracy (since 1967)
- Education: Utrecht University (Bachelor of Pharmacy, Master of Pharmacy)
- Occupation: Politician · Civil servant · Pharmacist · Corporate director · Nonprofit director · Author

Dirk Jan Dignus "Dick" Dees (born 13 December 1944) is a retired Dutch politician. A member of the People's Party for Freedom and Democracy (VVD), he served as State Secretary for Welfare, Health and Culture from 1986 to 1989.

== Decorations ==
Honours
Ribbon bar	Honour	Country	Date	Comment
	Knight of the Order of the Netherlands Lion	Netherlands	7 December 1985	
	Commander of the Order of Orange-Nassau	Netherlands	20 November 1989	

Political offices
Preceded by Joop van der Reijden	State Secretary for Welfare, Health and Culture; 1986–1989	Succeeded by Hans Simons
Preceded by Jean Bock	President of the Benelux Parliament; 1993–1994	Succeeded by Ady Jung
Non-profit organization positions
Preceded by Henk Bosma	Chairman of the Youth Organisation Freedom and Democracy; 1969–1971	Succeeded by Domien van Wees
