= Wouter Bos =

Dutch politician

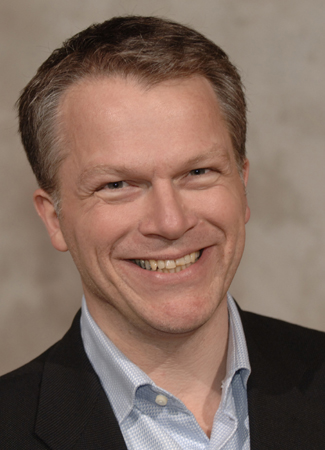
- Bos in 2007

Deputy Prime Minister of the Netherlands
- In office 22 February 2007 – 23 February 2010 Serving with André Rouvoet
- Prime Minister: Jan Peter Balkenende
- Preceded by: Gerrit Zalm
- Succeeded by: André Rouvoet

Minister of Finance
- In office 22 February 2007 – 23 February 2010
- Prime Minister: Jan Peter Balkenende
- Preceded by: Gerrit Zalm
- Succeeded by: Jan Kees de Jager

Leader of the Labour Party
- In office 19 November 2002 – 25 April 2010
- Preceded by: Ad Melkert
- Succeeded by: Job Cohen

Parliamentary leader in the House of Representatives
- In office 19 November 2002 – 22 February 2007
- Preceded by: Jeltje van Nieuwenhoven
- Succeeded by: Jacques Tichelaar
- Parliamentary group: Labour Party

State Secretary for Finance
- In office 24 March 2000 – 22 July 2002
- Prime Minister: Wim Kok
- Preceded by: Willem Vermeend
- Succeeded by: Steven van Eijk

Member of the House of Representatives
- In office 23 May 2002 – 22 February 2007
- In office 19 May 1998 – 24 March 2000

Personal details
- Born: Wouter Jacob Bos; 14 July 1963 (age 63) Vlaardingen, Netherlands
- Party: Labour Party (from 1981)
- Education: Vrije Universiteit Amsterdam (Bachelor of Social Science, Master of Social Science, Bachelor of Economics, Master of Economics)
- Occupation: Politician; civil servant; economist; businessman; corporate director; nonprofit director; management consultant; lobbyist

Wouter Jacob Bos (Dutch pronunciation: [ˈʋʌutər ˈbɔs]; born 14 July 1963) is a retired Dutch politician of the Labour Party (PvdA) and businessman.

Bos attended the Christian Gymnasium in Zeist from June 1975 until July 1980 and applied at the Vrije Universiteit Amsterdam in June 1981 majoring in Political science and Economics obtaining a Bachelor of Social Science degree and a Bachelor of Economics degree in June 1984 before graduating with a Master of Social Science degree and a Master of Economics degree in July 1988. Bos worked as a human resource manager for Royal Dutch Shell from August 1988 until May 1998 in Pernis from August 1988 until September 1989 in Rotterdam from September 1989 until July 1991 in Bucharest, Romania from July 1991 until April 1993 in Hong Kong from April 1993 until November 1995 and in London, England from November 1995 until May 1998.

Bos was elected as a Member of the House of Representatives after the election of 1998, taking office on 19 May 1998 serving as a frontbencher and spokesperson for Finances. Bos was appointed as State Secretary for Finance in the Cabinet Kok II following the appointment of Willem Vermeend as Minister of Social Affairs and Employment, taking office on 24 March 2000. After the election of 2002 Bos returned as a Member of the House of Representatives, taking office on 23 May 2002 serving again as a frontbencher and spokesperson for Finances. The Cabinet Kok II was replaced by the Cabinet Balkenende I following the cabinet formation of 2002 on 22 July 2002. After the Leader of the Labour Party and Parliamentary leader of the Labour Party in the House of Representatives Ad Melkert announced he was stepping down as Leader and Parliamentary leader in the House of Representatives following the defeat in the election, Bos announced his candidacy to succeed him. Bos won the leadership election defeating former Speaker of the House of Representatives Jeltje van Nieuwenhoven and former Minister of the Interior and Kingdom Relations Klaas de Vries and was elected as Leader and Parliamentary leader and lead candidate for the election of 2003, taking office on 19 November 2002. The Labour Party made a large win, gaining 19 seats and became the second largest party and now had 42 in the House of Representatives. For the Dutch general election of 2006 Bos again served as lead candidate. The Labour Party suffered a loss, losing 9 seats and now had 33 seats in the House of Representatives. The following cabinet formation of 2006 resulted in a coalition agreement between the Labour Party, the Christian Democratic Appeal (CDA) and the Christian Union (CU) which formed the Cabinet Balkenende IV with Bos appointed as Deputy Prime Minister and Minister of Finance, taking office on 22 February 2007. The Cabinet Balkenende IV fell on 20 February 2010 after tensions in the coalition over the extension of the Dutch involvement in the Task Force Uruzgan of the International Security Assistance Force (ISAF) in Afghanistan and continued to serve in a demissionary capacity until the Labour Party cabinets members resigned on 23 February 2010. On 12 March 2010 Bos unexpectedly announced his retirement from national politics and that he wouldn't stand for the election of 2010 and approached Job Cohen as his successor.

Bos semi-retired from national politics and became active in the private sector and public sector, in October 2010 Bos became a partner at the financial services firm KPMG. After the election of 2012 Bos was appointed as co-Informateur for the cabinet formation of 2012. In August 2013 Bos was nominated as chairman of the board of directors of the VU University Medical Center. In September 2018 Bos was appointed as chairman of the board of directors of the Netherlands Investment Agency, taking office on 1 October 2018. Bos also serves as a lobbyist for several economic delegations on behalf of the government. As of 2022 he is the chairman of health insurance company Menzis.

== Life ==
=== Youth ===
Bos was raised in a Doorbraak social-democratic family with a Protestant background in Vlaardingen. His father founded the ecumenical development cooperation fund ICCO, which he also led for many years. Between 1969 and 1974 Bos attended the Protestant elementary school de Beurthonk in Odijk. From 1974 he attended the Protestant high school Christelijk Lyceum in Zeist. In 1980 he graduated specializing in sciences and classics. In 1980–81 he was a Voluntary Instructor at the YMCA National Centre in Curdridge in the United Kingdom.

=== Life before politics ===
Bos became a member of the PvdA in 1981. In the same year he started studying Political Science at the Vrije Universiteit in Amsterdam. In 1982 he also took up Economics. In 1988 he graduated cum laude in both subjects.

From 1988 till 1998 he worked for Royal Dutch Shell in various positions. With a background in Shell, he differs from other Dutch leftwing politicians, who rarely have a background in a major multinational corporation. Bos began to work for Shell because he thought that "the Dutch Left should not leave the business world to the Dutch Right".

Between 1988 and 1990 he worked at the Pernis Refinery as a management consultant, where he was a specialist on training and reorganisation. In 1990 he became policy advisor for the central board, specializing in labour relations and working conditions, he also served as representative of the central board in its dealings with the central works council. In 1992–93 he was stationed as general affairs manager for Shell Romania Exploration, where he was responsible for setting up the Romanian branch of Shell. In 1993 he was stationed in Hong Kong, to work as staff planning and development manager for Shell Companies in Greater China, responsible for the recruitment and selection of new manager for Shell in South Korea, Taiwan, Hong Kong and China. In 1996 he returned to Europe, and worked as a consultant for new markets for Shell International Oil Products in London, focusing on acquisition in developing LPG markets in South America and Asia. In 1998 he left Shell to enter Dutch politics. For a short while he was policy advisor for the PvdA parliamentary party in the lower house and a personal assistant of the party's financial spokesperson, Rick van der Ploeg.

=== Political life ===
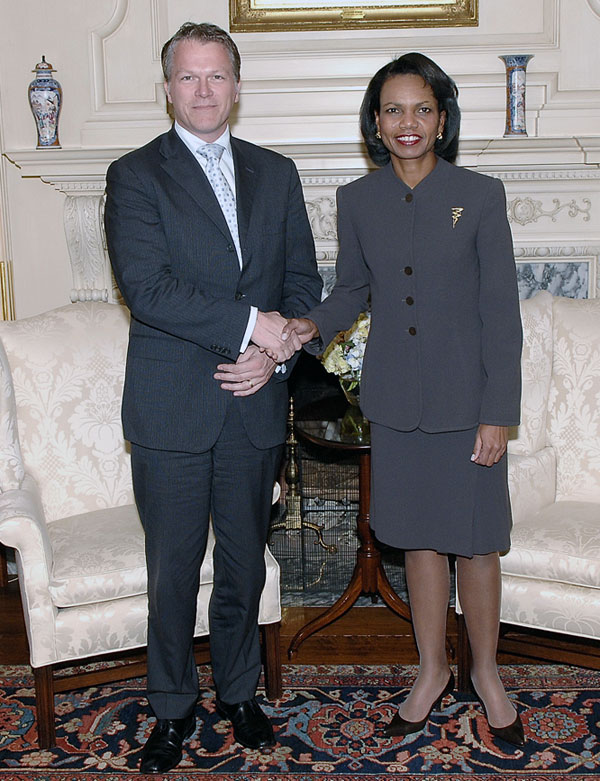
Deputy Prime Minister Wouter Bos and United States Secretary of State Condoleezza Rice during a meeting at the United States Department of State in Washington, D.C., on 23 October 2007.

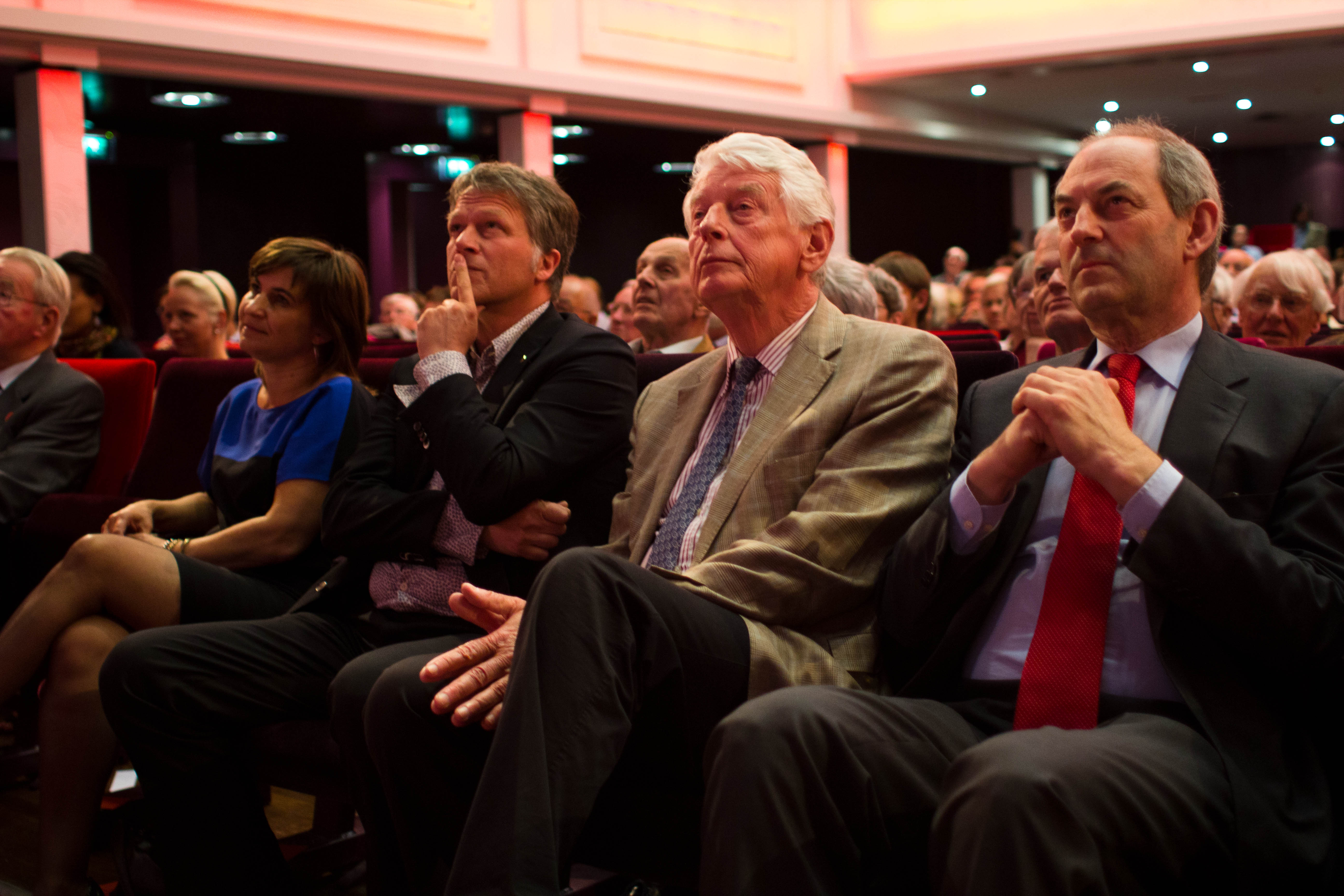
Wouter Bos and former Prime Minister Wim Kok and Leader of the Labour Party Job Cohen at a party conference in Amsterdam on 1 May 2011.

In 1998 he was elected into the lower house of parliament for the PvdA as finance specialist. He campaigned together with Rick van der Ploeg and Willem Vermeend as "the Polderboys" and gave lectures in economics at universities. In 2000, due to a cabinet reshuffle, he succeeded Willem Vermeend as staatssecretaris for Finance, and became responsible for taxation, monetary policy and finances of lower-level government. Together with Finance Minister Gerrit Zalm he was able to get parliamentary support for a radical reform of the tax system. After the May 2002 elections he returned to parliament, as a specialist on income policy and health affairs.

After the fall of the first Balkenende cabinet Bos was elected lead candidate for the following elections and de facto leader of the PvdA in the 2002 PvdA leadership election by 60% of the voting party members. He immediately became the chairman of the parliamentary party, succeeding Jeltje van Nieuwenhoven, and leaving her, Klaas de Vries and Jouke de Vries behind him by a 30% margin.

In the January 2003 election, Bos entered a head-to-head race with incumbent Prime Minister and leader of the Christian Democratic CDA, Jan Peter Balkenende. Under Bos the vote and seats of the PvdA nearly doubled from 15% (23 seats) in 2002 to 27% (42 seats) in 2003. This resurgence was partially credited to Bos' charisma and youthful appearance (and according to some journalists Bos' "sexy touch"). Balkenende's CDA however remained largest the party by a margin of two seats. The ensuing coalition formation talks between Balkenende and Bos failed after several months. The CDA went on to form a government with the conservative liberal VVD, and the progressive liberal D66.

At that time Bos was the leader of the largest opposition party. He spent considerable time reforming the PvdA's internal organisation and public image, together with the party's chairman Ruud Koole. He was criticized for his silence on important reforms and issues, and his moderacy which resulted in other parties claiming opposition leadership, among them most notably the Socialist Party. Although still enjoying large public support, criticism about his "style over substance" approach to politics was voiced in this period. At the December 2005 party congress, Bos announced that he aspired to become Prime Minister of the Netherlands, should the PvdA succeed in becoming the biggest party after the next parliament elections. And in the 2006 municipal elections, a few months later, the PvdA performed particularly well, becoming the largest party in local government.

However, in the election campaign for the Dutch general elections of 2006 the PvdA – for the second time campaigning under his leadership – didn't manage to maintain this position as biggest party. Some considered pension reforms proposed by him to embattle the consequences of an aging population as a reason for this decline in popularity. Others emphasized a declining confidence in Bos among parts of the electorate that perceived him as "unreliable", as reason for this. Bos lost nine seats in the elections, which saw large gains for the main rival of Labour on the left side of the political spectrum, the more radical Socialist Party. Nonetheless, after these elections (and this time successful coalition talks with Prime Minister Balkenende), Bos became Deputy Prime Minister and Minister of Finance in the Fourth Balkenende cabinet, thereby breaking a campaign promise to only join a cabinet when he could hold the office of Prime Minister.

As part of the leadership of the PvdA he revoked his confidence in fellow party member Ella Vogelaar as Minister of Integration and Housing. She subsequently resigned her post on 13 November 2008. The Dutch parliamentary press chose him as politician of the year 2008, largely due to his management of the 2008 financial crisis that included nationalization of the Fortis bank.

== Other activities ==
- European Bank for Reconstruction and Development (EBRD), Ex-Officio Member of the Board of Governors (2007–2010)

== Personal life ==
In December 2002 Bos married Barbara Bos (the surname is a coincidence). The master of ceremonies of his marriage was Joop Wijn, the former State Secretary of finance for the CDA. Wouter and Barbara Bos have two daughters, Iris (5 February 2004) and Jula (3 January 2006) and a son Joppe (18 April 2009).

== Decorations ==
Honours
Ribbon bar	Honour	Country	Date	Comment
	Officer of the Order of Orange-Nassau	Netherlands	3 December 2010	Elevated from Knight (10 December 2002)

Party political offices
Preceded by Jeltje van Nieuwenhoven	Parliamentary leader of the Labour Party in the House of Representatives; 2002–2007	Succeeded by Jacques Tichelaar
Preceded by Ad Melkert	Leader of the Labour Party; 2002–2010	Succeeded by Job Cohen
Preceded by Ad Melkert; 2002	Lead candidate of the Labour Party; 2003 • 2006	Succeeded by Job Cohen; 2010
Political offices
Preceded by Willem Vermeend	State Secretary for Finance; 2000–2002	Succeeded by Steven van Eijk
Preceded by Gerrit Zalm	Deputy Prime Minister; 2007–2010; Served alongside: André Rouvoet	Succeeded by André Rouvoet
Preceded by Gerrit Zalm	Minister of Finance; 2007–2010	Succeeded by Jan Kees de Jager
Business positions
Preceded by Cees Veerman	Chairman of the Board of directors of the VU University Medical Center; 2013–2018	Succeeded by Chris Polman
