= Hans Simons =

Dutch politician (1947-2019)

State Secretary for Welfare, Health and Culture
- In office 7 November 1989 – 26 February 1994
- Prime Minister: Ruud Lubbers
- Minister: Hedy d'Ancona
- Preceded by: Dick Dees
- Succeeded by: Erica Terpstra

Personal details
- Born: Henri Johan Simons; 20 December 1947 Witmarsum, Netherlands
- Died: 27 March 2019 (aged 71) Renesse, Netherlands
- Party: Labour Party (PvdA) (from 1977)
- Other political affiliations: Political Party of Radicals (until 1977)
- Occupation: Politician

Henri Johan "Hans" Simons (20 December 1947 – 27 March 2019) was a Dutch politician of the Labour Party (PvdA).

Political offices
Preceded by Dick Dees	State Secretary for Welfare, Health and Culture; 1989–1994	Succeeded by Erica Terpstra
