= Jouke de Vries =

Dutch political scientist and politician

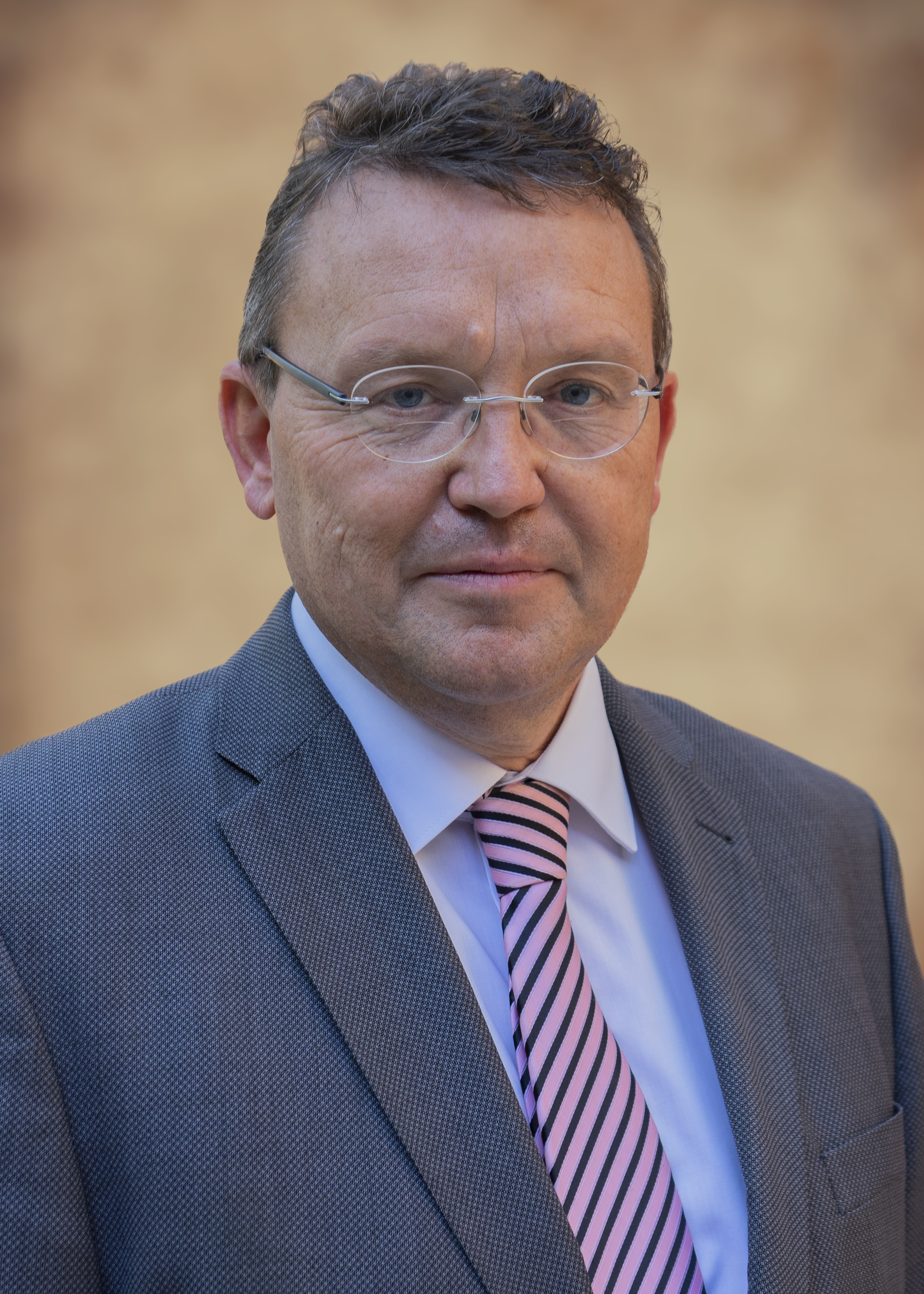
Jouke de Vries in 2018

Jouke de Vries (born 26 September 1960) is a Dutch political scientist, university administrator, and politician. He is chairman of the Executive Board of the University of Groningen (RUG) in the Netherlands. Before that he was Dean of the University of Groningen/Campus Fryslân in Leeuwarden.

== Biography ==
De Vries was born on 26 September 1960 in Dearsum. He grew up in the village of Balk in Friesland and in 1979 started his studies in political science at the University of Amsterdam. He has been working at the group Leaderships Art at the University of Leiden since 1984. De Vries obtained his PhD in 1989 from H. Daudt and H. Daalder on the thesis he wrote on "Ground Politics" (later made into a book by the same name) and the educational essay "Cabinet Crisis in the Netherlands".

In 2002, he was a candidate for the leadership of the Partij van de Arbeid, but got only two percent of the votes of the party members against sixty percent for the chosen leader Wouter Bos. He teaches students at Leiden University in his role as a professor of political science (Dutch: hoogleraar). He regularly speaks to international groups of students, especially exchange students. He is currently a columnist for a Dutch language website, where he writes his own blog each week. Here he writes on recent news from the worlds of politics and economics.

De Vries is member of the board of The Hague Institute for Global Justice.

De Vries worked in Leeuwarden as dean of University of Groningen/Campus Fryslân until he was promoted to president of the University of Groningen on 1 October 2018. De Vries is married to Margriet Ekens and has two children, son Hidde de Vries and daughter Jildou de Vries.
