= Labour Party (Netherlands) =

Dutch social democratic political party

Labour Party Partij van de Arbeid
- Abbreviation: PvdA
- Founded: 9 February 1946
- Dissolved: 1 July 2026
- Merger of: SDAP; VDB; CDU
- Merged into: Progressief Nederland
- Headquarters: Partijbureau PvdA, Leeghwaterplein 45, The Hague
- Youth wing: Young Socialists
- Think tank: Wiardi Beckman Foundation
- Membership (2026): ▲63,909
- Ideology: Social democracy
- Political position: Centre-left
- National affiliation: GroenLinks–PvdA (2023–2026)
- Regional affiliation: SGD/SVD
- European affiliation: Party of European Socialists
- European Parliament group: Progressive Alliance of Socialists and Democrats
- International affiliation: Progressive Alliance (2013–2026); Socialist International (until 2014)
- Colours: Red

The Labour Party (Dutch: Partij van de Arbeid [pɑrˈtɛi vɑn də ˈʔɑrbɛit], PvdA [ˌpeːveːdeːˈjaː, -deːˈʔaː] or P van de A [ˌpeː vɑn də ˈʔaː]) was a social democratic political party in the Netherlands.

The party was founded in 1946 as a merger of the Social Democratic Workers' Party, the Free-thinking Democratic League and the Christian Democratic Union. Prime Ministers from the Labour Party have been Willem Drees (1948–1958), Joop den Uyl (1973–1977) and Wim Kok (1994–2002). From 2012 to 2017, the PvdA formed the second-largest party in parliament and was the secondary partner in the Second Rutte cabinet with the People's Party for Freedom and Democracy.

The party fell to nine seats in the House of Representatives at the 2017 general election, making it the seventh-largest faction in the chamber—its worst showing ever. However, the party rebounded with a first-place finish in the 2019 European Parliament election in the Netherlands, winning six of 26 seats, with 19% of the vote. The party is a member of the European Party of European Socialists and the global Progressive Alliance. In the European Parliament, where the Labour Party has four seats, it is part of the Progressive Alliance of Socialists and Democrats.

From 2023 until its dissolution, the party participated in an electoral alliance with GroenLinks named GroenLinks–PvdA; the parties formally merged on 1 July 2026 to form Progressive Netherlands. The electoral alliance finished second in the 2023 general election before falling back to fourth in the 2025 general election.

== History ==
=== Early years (1946–1965) ===
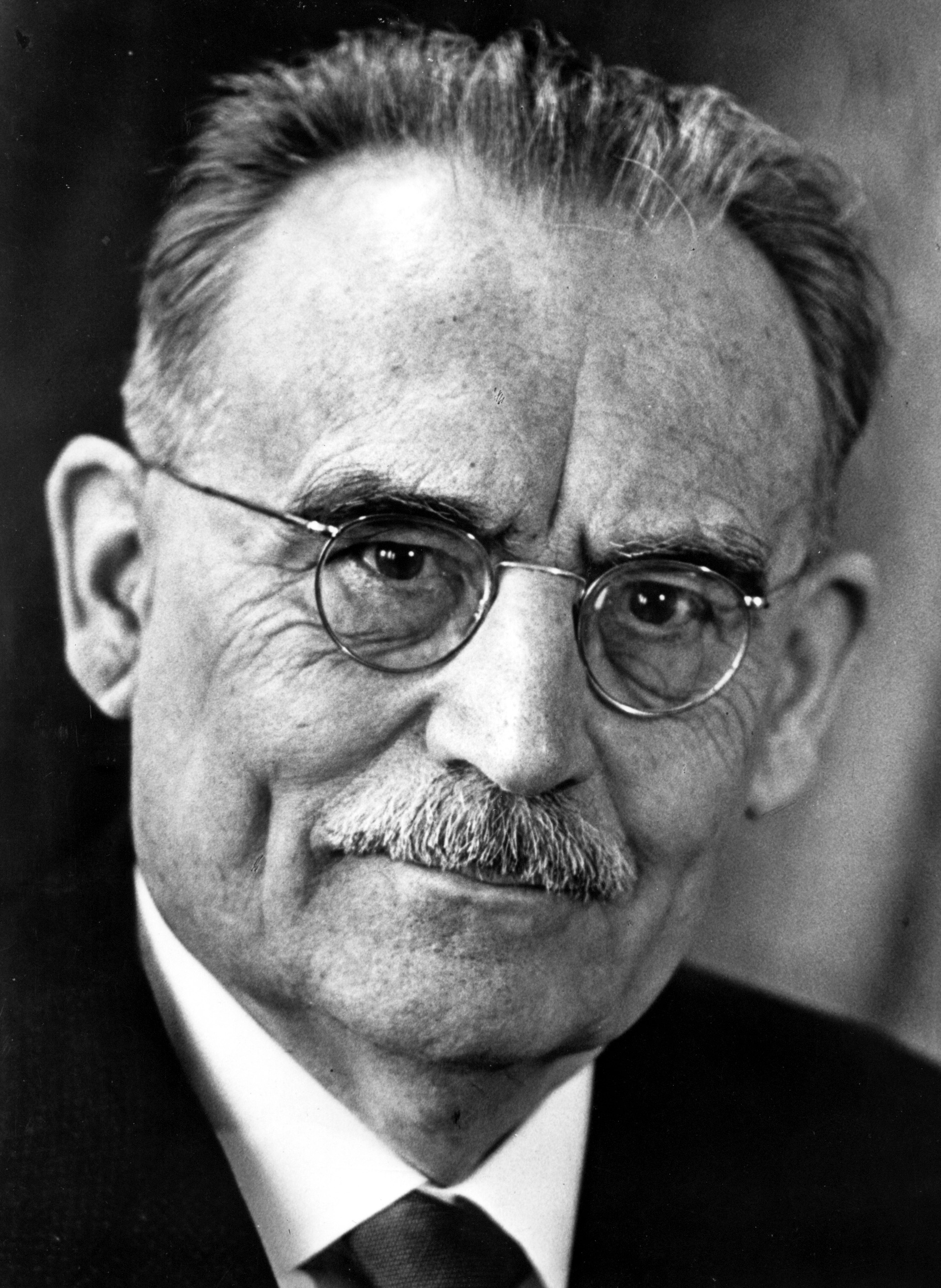
Willem Drees, co-founder, party leader (1946–1958) and Prime Minister (1948–1958)

During the German occupation of the Netherlands in World War II, a group of prominent Dutchmen of all democratic political ideologies were interned as hostages in Kamp Sint-Michielsgestel by the German occupation authorities. They came to the consensus that the pre-war fragmentation of Dutch political life, known as "Pillarisation", should be overcome after the war in a so-called Breakthrough. These people formed the Dutch People's Movement (NVB) immediately after the war ended in 1945. The new movement promoted the foundation of the Labour Party on 9 February 1946 through a merger of three pre-war parties, namely the Social Democratic Workers' Party (SDAP), the social liberal Free-thinking Democratic League (VDB) and the progressive Protestant Christian Democratic Union (CDU). They were joined by individuals from Catholic resistance group Christofoor, as well as some of the more progressive members of the Protestant Christian Historical Union (CHU). The founding convention was chaired by NVB member Willem Banning.

Despite its ambitions to force a breakthrough, the electorate returned to their pillars. Led by Willem Drees in the 1946 general election, it won 29 seats, two less than its predecessors had won in 1937. During the 1946 cabinet formation, the first Beel cabinet was formed with the Catholic People's Party (KVP) and the PvdA (Roman/Red). In 1948, some of the left-liberal members, led by former VDB leader Pieter Oud, left the PvdA after concluding it had become too socialist for their liking. Together with the Freedom Party, they formed the People's Party for Freedom and Democracy (VVD), a conservative liberal party.

Between 1948 and 1958, the PvdA led centre-left coalition governments with the KVP, and combinations of VVD, ARP and CHU, with the PvdA's Willem Drees as prime minister. The KVP and the PvdA together had a large majority in parliament. Under his leadership the Netherlands recovered from the war and began to build its welfare state, and Indonesia became independent.

After the cabinet crisis of 1958, the PvdA was replaced by the VVD. The PvdA was in opposition until 1965. The electoral support of PvdA voters began to decline.

=== 1965–1989 ===
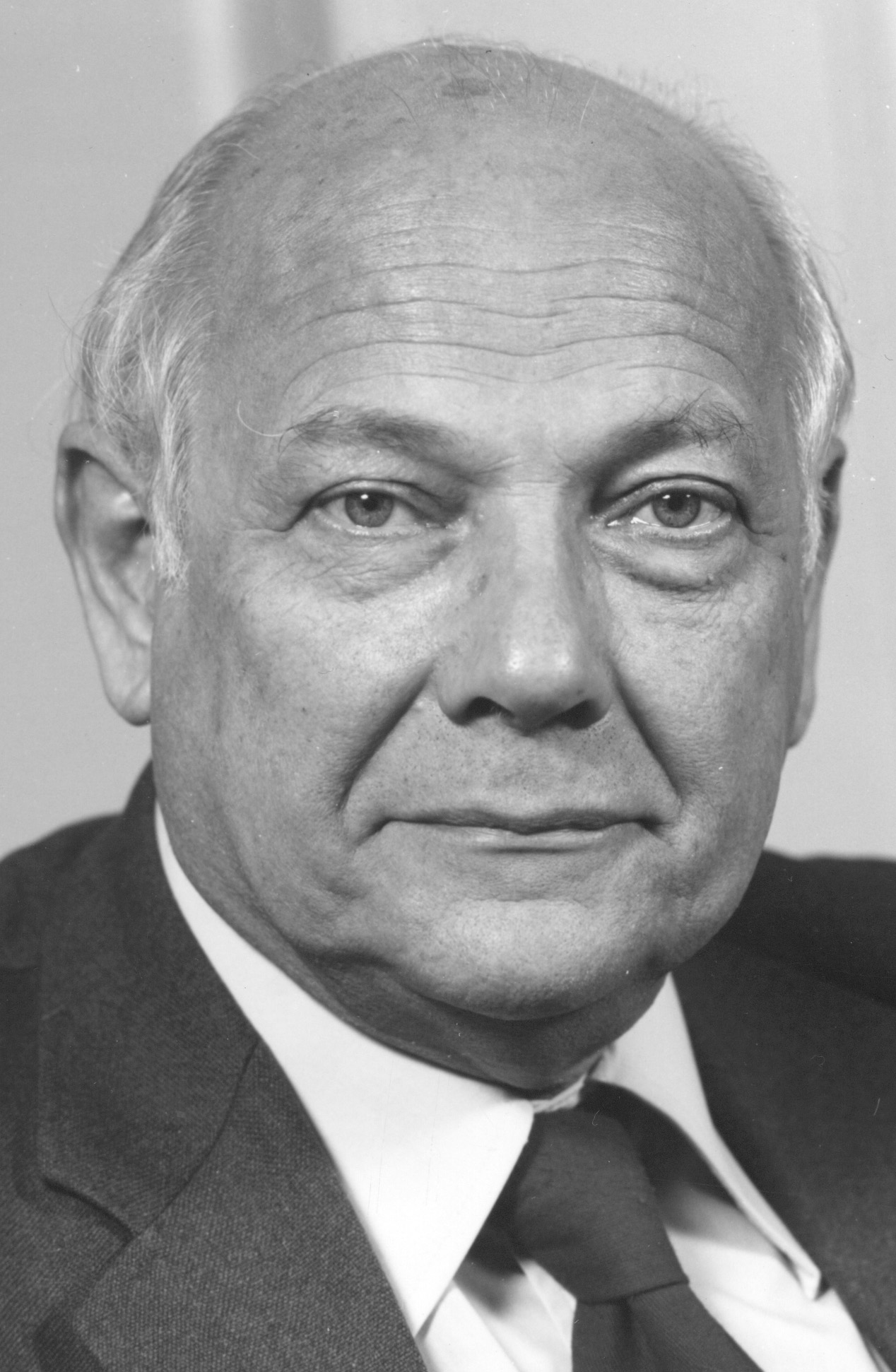
Joop den Uyl, party leader (1966–1986) and Prime Minister (1973–1977)

In 1965, a conflict in the centre-right cabinet made continuation of the government impossible. The three confessional parties turned toward the PvdA. Together they formed the Cals cabinet, with KVP leader Jo Cals as prime minister. This cabinet too was short-lived and conflict-ridden. The conflicts culminated in the fall of the Cals cabinet over economic policy.

Meanwhile, a younger generation was attempting to gain control of the PvdA. A group of young PvdA members, calling themselves the New Left, changed the party. The New Left believed the party should become oriented towards the new social movements, adopting their anti-parliamentary strategies and their issues, such as women's liberation, environmental conservation and Third World development. Prominent New Left members were Jan Nagel, André van der Louw and Bram Peper. One of their early victories followed the fall of the Cals cabinet. The party Congress adopted a motion that made it impossible for the PvdA to govern with the KVP and its Protestant allies. In response to the growing power of the New Left group, a group of older, centrist party members, led by Willem Drees' son, Willem Drees Jr., founded the New Right. They split in 1970, after it was clear that they had lost the conflict with the New Left, and founded a new moderate social democratic party, Democratic Socialists '70 (DS'70).

Under the New Left, the PvdA started a strategy of polarisation, striving for a cabinet based on a progressive majority in parliament. In order to form that cabinet, the PvdA allied itself with smaller progressive parties such as the Democrats '66 (D'66) and the Political Party of Radicals (PPR). The alliance was called the Progressive Accord (PAK). In the 1971 and 1972 general elections, these three parties promised to form a cabinet with a radical common programme after the elections. They were unable to gain a majority in either election. In 1971, they were kept out of cabinet, and the party of former PvdA members, DS'70, became a coalition partner in the First Biesheuvel cabinet.

In the 1972 elections, neither the PvdA and its allies nor the KVP and its allies were able to gain a majority. The two sides were forced to work together. Joop den Uyl, the leader of the PvdA, led the cabinet. The cabinet was an extra-parliamentary cabinet composed of members of the three progressive parties, the KVP and the ARP. The cabinet attempted to radically reform government, society and the economy, and a wide range of progressive social reforms were enacted during its time in office, such as significant increases in welfare payments and the indexation of benefits and the minimum wage to the cost of living.

The PvdA also faced economic decline and was riddled with personal and ideological conflicts. The relationship between Prime Minister Den Uyl and the KVP Deputy Prime Minister Dries Van Agt was particularly problematic. These conflict culminated when the cabinet fell just before the 1977 general election. The PvdA came first in that election, but the ideological and personal conflict between Van Agt and Den Uyl prevented the formation of a new centre-left cabinet. After very long cabinet formation talks, the Christian Democratic Appeal (CDA), itself a new Christian democratic political formation composed of KVP, CHU and ARP, formed a government, based on a very narrow majority, with the VVD. The PvdA was left in opposition.

In the 1981 general election, the incumbent CDA–VVD cabinet lost its majority. The CDA remained the largest party, but it was forced to co-operate with the PvdA and D'66 (the PPR had left the alliance, after losing in the 1977 election). In the new cabinet led by Van Agt, Den Uyl returned to cabinet as Deputy Prime Minister. The personal and ideological conflict between Van Agt and Den Uyl culminated in the fall of the cabinet just months after it was formed. The VVD and the CDA together had a majority in the 1982 general election and retained this in the 1986 general election. The PvdA was left in opposition. During this period the party began to reform. Den Uyl retired from politics in 1986, appointing former trade union leader Wim Kok as his successor.

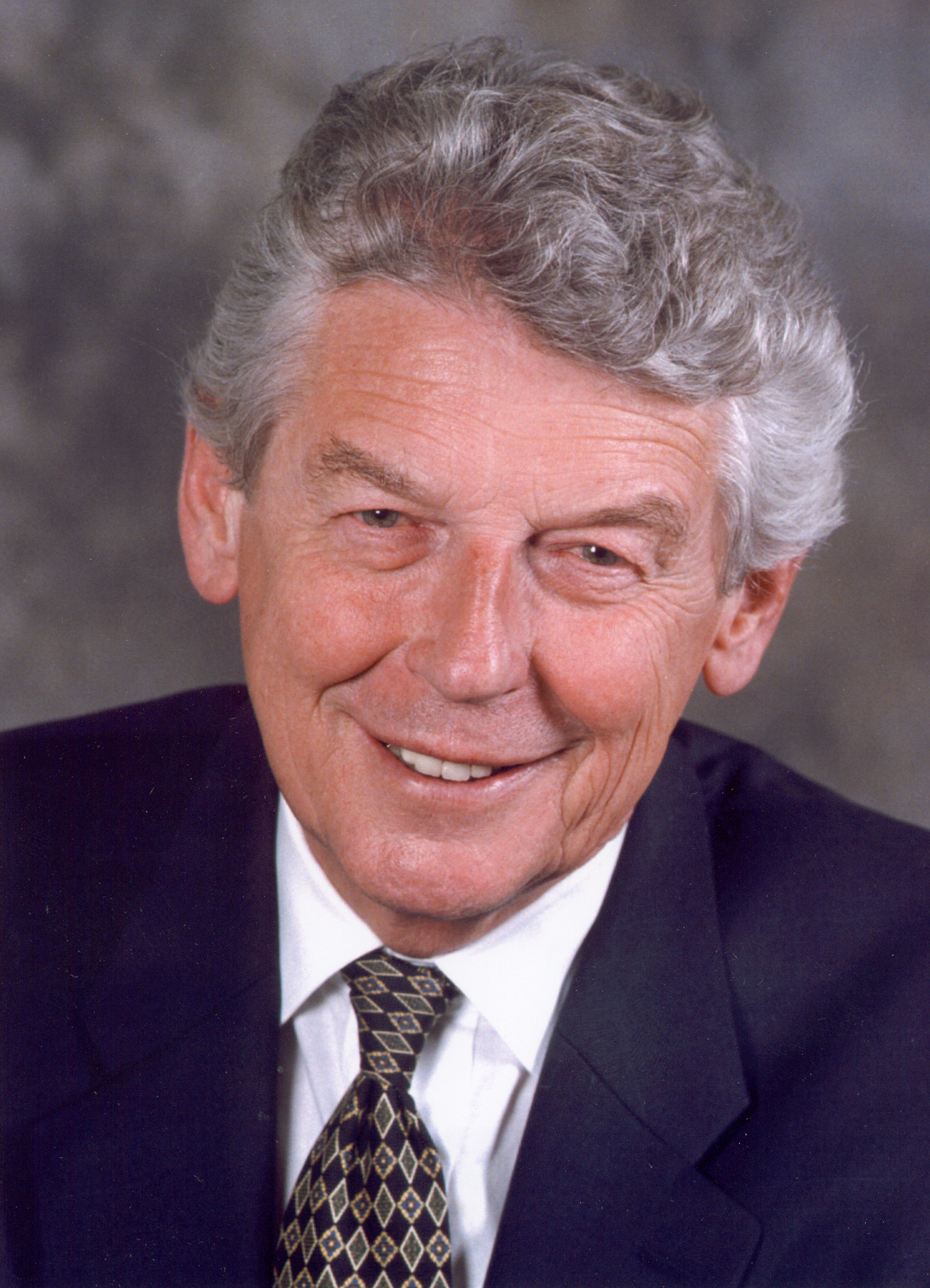
Wim Kok, Third Way party leader (1986–2001) and Prime Minister (1994–2002)

=== 1989–2010 ===
After the 1989 general election, the PvdA returned to cabinet together with the CDA. Kok became Deputy Prime Minister to CDA leader Ruud Lubbers. The PvdA accepted the major economic reforms of the previous Lubbers cabinets, including privatisation of public enterprises and reform of the welfare state. They continued these policies in this cabinet. The cabinet faced heavy protest from the unions and saw major political conflict within the PvdA itself.

In the 1994 general election, the PvdA–CDA coalition lost its majority in parliament; the PvdA, however, emerged as the biggest party. Kok formed a government together with the conservative liberal VVD and social liberal D66. This so-called purple government was a political novelty, because it was the first since 1918 without any ministers from the CDA or its predecessors. The First Kok cabinet continued the Lubbers-era economic reforms, but combined this with a progressive outlook on ethical questions and promises of political reform. Kok became a very popular Prime Minister; he was not a partisan figure but combined successful technocratic policies with the charisma of a national leader. In the 1998 general election, the cabinet was rewarded for its stewardship of the economy. The PvdA and the VVD increased their seat counts, at the expense of D66; the Second Kok cabinet was formed.

Kok retired from politics, leaving the leadership of the party to his preferred successor Ad Melkert. The PvdA was expected to perform very well in the 2002 general election; however, the political rise of Pim Fortuyn frustrated these hopes. The PvdA lost the 2002 election, and the party's parliamentary representation fell from 45 seats to 23. The loss was blamed on the uncharismatic new leader Melkert, the perceived arrogance of the PvdA and the inability to answer the right-wing populist issues Fortuyn raised, especially immigration and integration. Melkert resigned as party leader and was replaced by Jeltje van Nieuwenhoven. The PvdA was kept out of cabinet. The government formed by CDA, VVD and the Pim Fortuyn List (LPF) fell after a very short period.

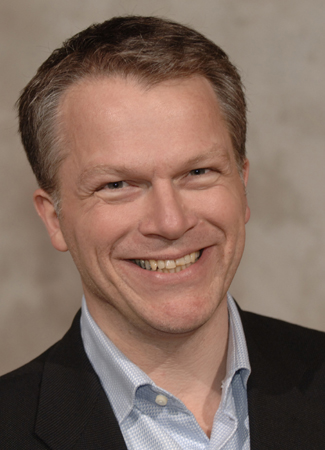
Wouter Bos, party leader (2002–2010)

Meanwhile, Wouter Bos, Undersecretary in the Second Kok cabinet, was elected leader of the PvdA in a ballot among PvdA members, being elected closely to Jouke de Vries. He started to democratise the party organisation and began an ideological reorientation. In the 2003 general election, Wouter Bos managed to regain almost all seats lost in the previous election, and the PvdA was once again the second largest party in the Netherlands, only slightly smaller than the CDA. Personal and ideological conflicts between Bos and the CDA leader Jan Peter Balkenende prevented the formation of a CDA–PvdA cabinet. Instead, the PvdA was kept out of government by the formation of cabinet of the CDA, the VVD, and D66, the latter being former allies of PvdA. In the 2006 municipal elections, the renewed PvdA performed very well. The PvdA became by far the largest party nationally, while the three governing parties lost a considerable number of seats in municipal councils.

The PvdA lost the race for Prime Minister to the CDA after suffering a loss of nine seats in the 2006 general election. The PvdA now held only 33 seats, losing many votes to the Socialist Party (SP). The PvdA had previously distanced themselves from the idea of a voting bloc on the left. It did, however, join the fourth Balkenende cabinet on 22 February 2007, in which Wouter Bos became minister of Finance. In the aftermath of the lost elections, the entire party executive stepped down on 26 April 2007. On Saturday 20 February 2010, the Labour Party withdrew from the government after arguments over the Dutch role in Afghanistan.

=== 2010–2023 ===
The then-mayor of Amsterdam, Job Cohen, took Wouter Bos' place as leader of the PvdA following the latter quitting politics. In the 2010 general election, the PvdA won 30 seats, a loss of three, and was narrowly overtaken by the VVD. After the election, a 'purple-plus coalition' was considered, which would have required the participation of GroenLinks, in addition to the VVD, PvdA and D66 – but talks broke down and the PvdA entered opposition.

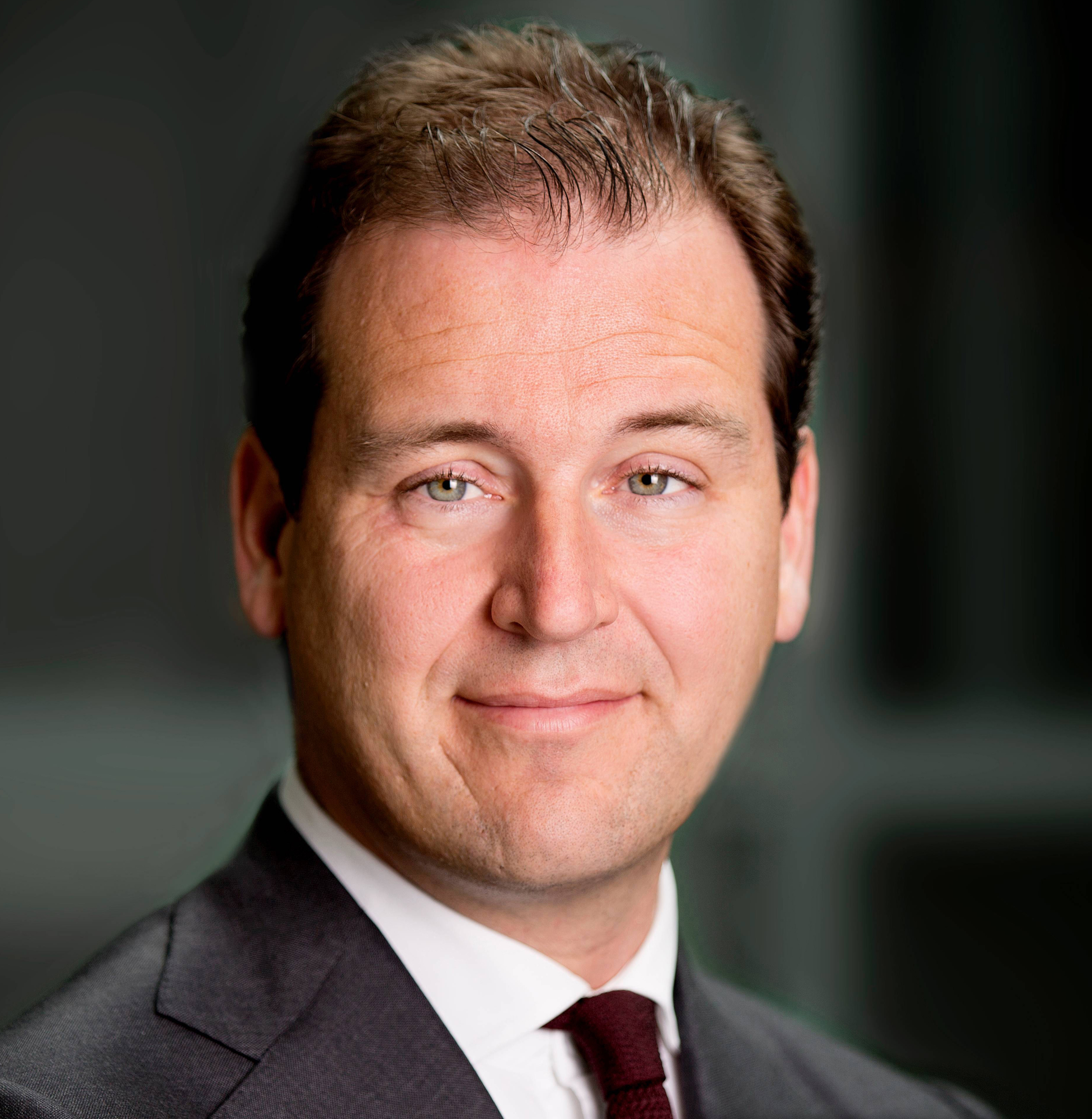
Lodewijk Asscher, party leader (2016–2021)

Cohen resigned as leader in February 2012. Diederik Samsom was subsequently elected the party leader. In the 2012 general election, the Labour Party won 38 seats, a gain of eight, defying initial predictions that the Socialist Party would overtake it. Following the election the party entered a governing coalition with the VVD under Mark Rutte, with Labour's Lodewijk Asscher becoming Deputy Prime Minister.

In December 2016, Samson was defeated by Lodewijk Asscher in a party leadership election. In the 2017 general election, the PvdA suffered the biggest defeat in Dutch electoral history, receiving only 5.7% of the votes and losing 29 of its 38 seats. Asscher did not resign from his post, claiming the defeat was his predecessor's responsibility. The party experienced a degree of revival in 2019, obtaining the most votes in that year's European Parliament election. This marked the first time the PvdA had finished first in a national election since 1998.

Ahead of the 2021 general election, Asscher resigned from the party leadership due to his part in the childcare benefits scandal. He was replaced as leader and lead candidate by Lilianne Ploumen, who became the party's first permanent female leader. Following the election, the PvdA participated unsuccessfully in the 2021 Dutch cabinet formation in conjunction with GroenLinks. Ploumen later left, claiming she was unsuited for the leadership. Ploumen was replaced as parliamentary leader by Attje Kuiken.

=== 2023–2026 ===
Following the 2023 Senate election on 30 May 2023, PvdA and GroenLinks deepened their co-operation by forming a joint parliamentary group in the senate, becoming the second-largest group behind the Farmer–Citizen Movement.

On 17 July 2023, the party and GroenLinks announced that they would contest the 2023 general election with a common policy programme and joint electoral list. With Frans Timmermans as lead candidate, the joint parliamentary group became the second largest with 25 seats, but did not become part of the coalition. On 12 June 2025, members of the PvdA voted in favour of another joint list for the general elections of 2025, as well as a merger with GroenLinks into a new party in 2026. The new party, named Progressive Netherlands, was formally formed on 1 July 2026.

== Ideology ==
The PvdA began as a traditional social democratic party, committed to building a welfare state. During the 1970s, it included new issues in its programme such as environmental conservation, Third World development and women's liberation. During the 1990s it moderated its programme to include Third Way economic and social positions, including reform of the welfare state and privatisation of public enterprise. The party adopted a new programme of principles in 2005, expressing a centre-left ideology. Its core issues are employment, social security and welfare as well as investing in public education, health care and public safety.

== Organisation ==
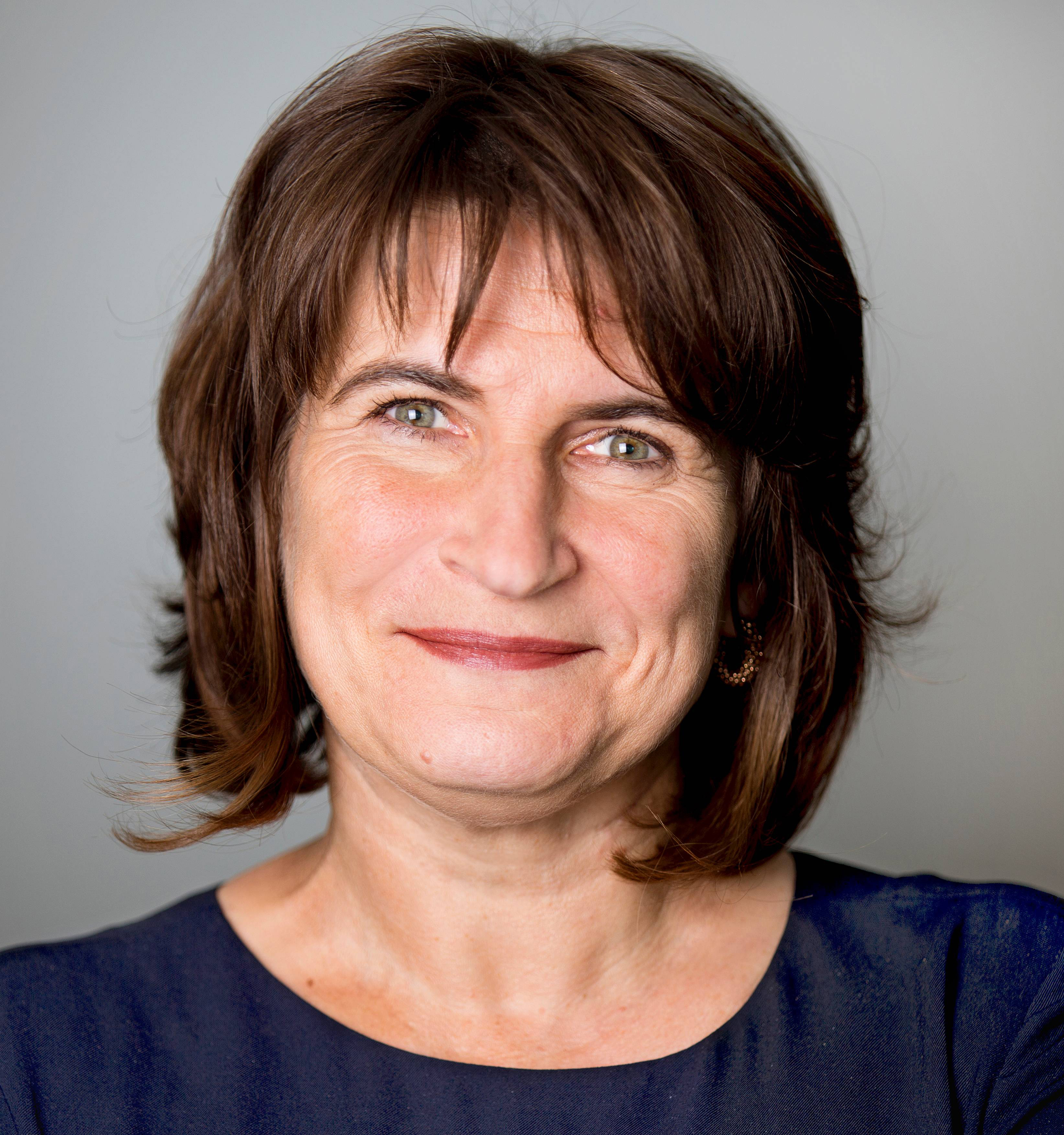
Lilianne Ploumen, party leader from January 2021 until April 2022

=== Leadership ===
- Parliamentary leaders in the House of Representatives
  - Marinus van der Goes van Naters (4 June 1946 – 16 January 1951)
  - Jaap Burger (16 January 1951 – 18 September 1951)
  - Leendert Antonie Donker (18 September 1951 – 2 September 1952)
  - Jaap Burger (2 September 1952 – 16 September 1962)
  - Anne Vondeling (16 September 1962 – 14 April 1965)
  - Gerard Nederhorst (14 April 1965 – 23 February 1967)
  - Joop den Uyl (23 February 1967 – 11 May 1973)
  - Ed van Thijn (11 May 1973 – 8 June 1977)
  - Joop den Uyl (8 June 1977 – 8 September 1977)
  - Ed van Thijn (8 September 1977 – 16 January 1978)
  - Joop den Uyl (16 January 1978 – 11 September 1981)
  - Wim Meijer (11 September 1981 – 16 September 1982)
  - Joop den Uyl (16 September 1982 – 21 July 1986)
  - Wim Kok (21 July 1986 – 4 November 1989)
  - Thijs Wöltgens (4 November 1989 – 17 May 1994)
  - Wim Kok (17 May 1994 – 22 August 1994)
  - Jacques Wallage (22 August 1994 – 19 May 1998)
  - Wim Kok (19 May 1998 – 30 May 1998)
  - Jacques Wallage (30 May 1998 – 10 July 1998)
  - Ad Melkert (10 July 1998 – 16 May 2002)
  - Jeltje van Nieuwenhoven (16 May 2002 – 19 November 2002)
  - Wouter Bos (19 November 2002 – 22 February 2007)
  - Jacques Tichelaar (22 February 2007 – 22 January 2008)
  - Mariëtte Hamer (22 January 2008 – 17 June 2010)
  - Job Cohen (17 June 2010 – 20 February 2012)
  - Jeroen Dijsselbloem (20 February 2012 – 20 March 2012)
  - Diederik Samsom (20 March 2012 – 12 December 2016)
  - Attje Kuiken (12 December 2016 – 23 March 2017)
  - Lodewijk Asscher (23 March 2017 – 14 January 2021)
  - Lilianne Ploumen (14 January 2021 – 12 April 2022)
  - Attje Kuiken (22 April 2022 – 26 October 2023)
- Chairs
  - Koos Vorrink (9 February 1946 – 5 June 1953)
  - Hein Vos (5 June 1953 – 23 February 1955)
  - Evert Vermeer (23 February 1955 – 10 May 1960)
  - Hein Vos (10 May 1960 – 24 March 1961; ad interim)
  - Ko Suurhoff (24 March 1961 – 14 April 1965)
    - Vacant (14 April 1965 – 12 June 1965)
  - Sjeng Tans (12 June 1965 – 7 March 1969)
  - Anne Vondeling (7 March 1969 – 1 May 1971)
  - André van der Louw (1 May 1971 – 16 November 1974)
  - Ien van den Heuvel-de Blank (16 November 1974 – 26 April 1979)
  - Max van den Berg (26 April 1979 – 1 August 1986)
  - Stan Poppe (1 August 1986 – 2 April 1987; ad interim)
  - Marjanne Sint (2 April 1987 – 1 August 1991)
  - Frits Castricum (1 August 1991 – 13 March 1992; ad interim)
  - Felix Rottenberg (13 March 1992 – 15 February 1997; co-chair)
  - Ruud Vreeman (13 March 1992 – 15 February 1997; co-chair)
  - Karin Adelmund (15 February 1997 – 3 August 1998)
  - Ruud Vreeman (3 August 1998 – 20 February 1999; ad interim)
  - Marijke van Hees (20 February 1999 – 5 September 2000)
  - Mariëtte Hamer (5 September 2000 – 16 March 2001; ad interim)
  - Ruud Koole (16 March 2001 – 9 December 2005)
  - Michiel van Hulten (9 December 2005 – 25 April 2007)
  - Ruud Koole (25 April 2007 – 6 October 2007; ad interim)
  - Lilianne Ploumen (6 October 2007 – 22 January 2012)
  - Hans Spekman (22 January 2012 – 7 October 2017)
  - Nelleke Vedelaar (7 October 2017 – 1 October 2021)
  - Esther-Mirjam Sent (since 1 October 2021)

- Parliamentary leaders in the Senate
  - Marius Reinalda (9 February 1946 – 18 March 1947)
  - Jo van de Kieft (27 March 1947 – 15 July 1952)
  - Kees Woudenberg (15 July 1952 – 2 September 1952)
  - Joris in 't Veld (2 September 1952 – 15 November 1960)
  - Hein Vos (15 November 1960 – 16 February 1968)
  - Maarten de Niet (5 March 1968 – 7 October 1968)
  - Jan Broeksz (7 October 1968 – 16 September 1975)
  - Anne Vermeer (16 September 1975 – 23 June 1987)
  - Ger Schinck (23 June 1987 – 13 June 1995)
  - Joop van den Berg (13 June 1995 – 1 August 1996)
  - Job Cohen (1 August 1996 – 3 August 1998)
  - Ria Jaarsma (3 August 1998 – 8 June 1999)
  - Geertje Lycklama à Nijeholt (8 June 1999 – 10 June 2003)
  - Johan Stekelenburg (10 June 2003 – 22 September 2003)
  - Han Noten (11 November 2003 – 7 June 2011)
  - Marleen Barth (7 June 2011 – 8 February 2018)
  - André Postema (8 February 2018 – 10 July 2018)
  - Esther-Mirjam Sent (4 September 2018 – 11 June 2019)
  - Mei Li Vos (11 June 2019 – 13 June 2023)

=== Organisational structure ===
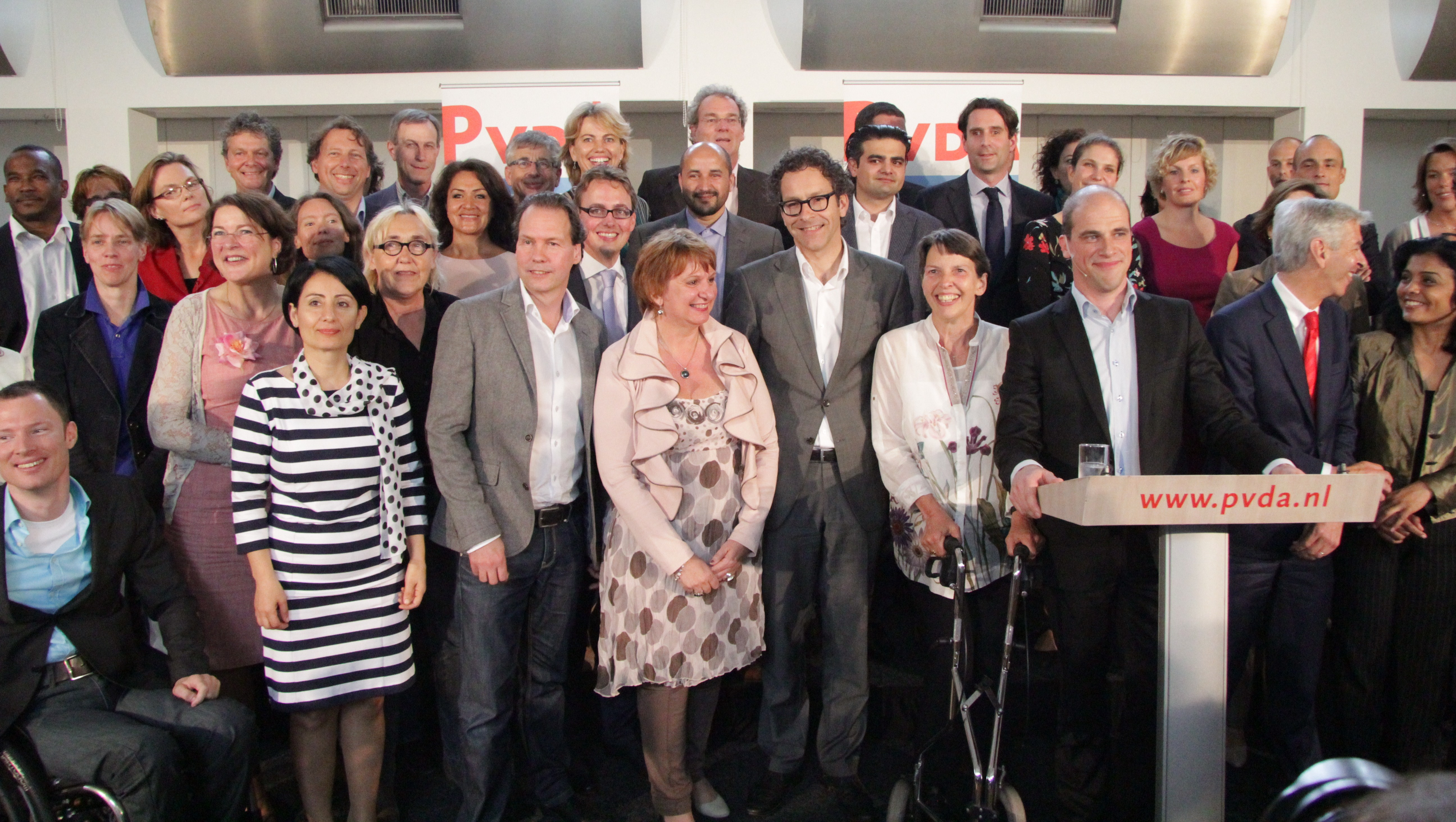
Presentation of the PvdA candidates for the 2012 general election

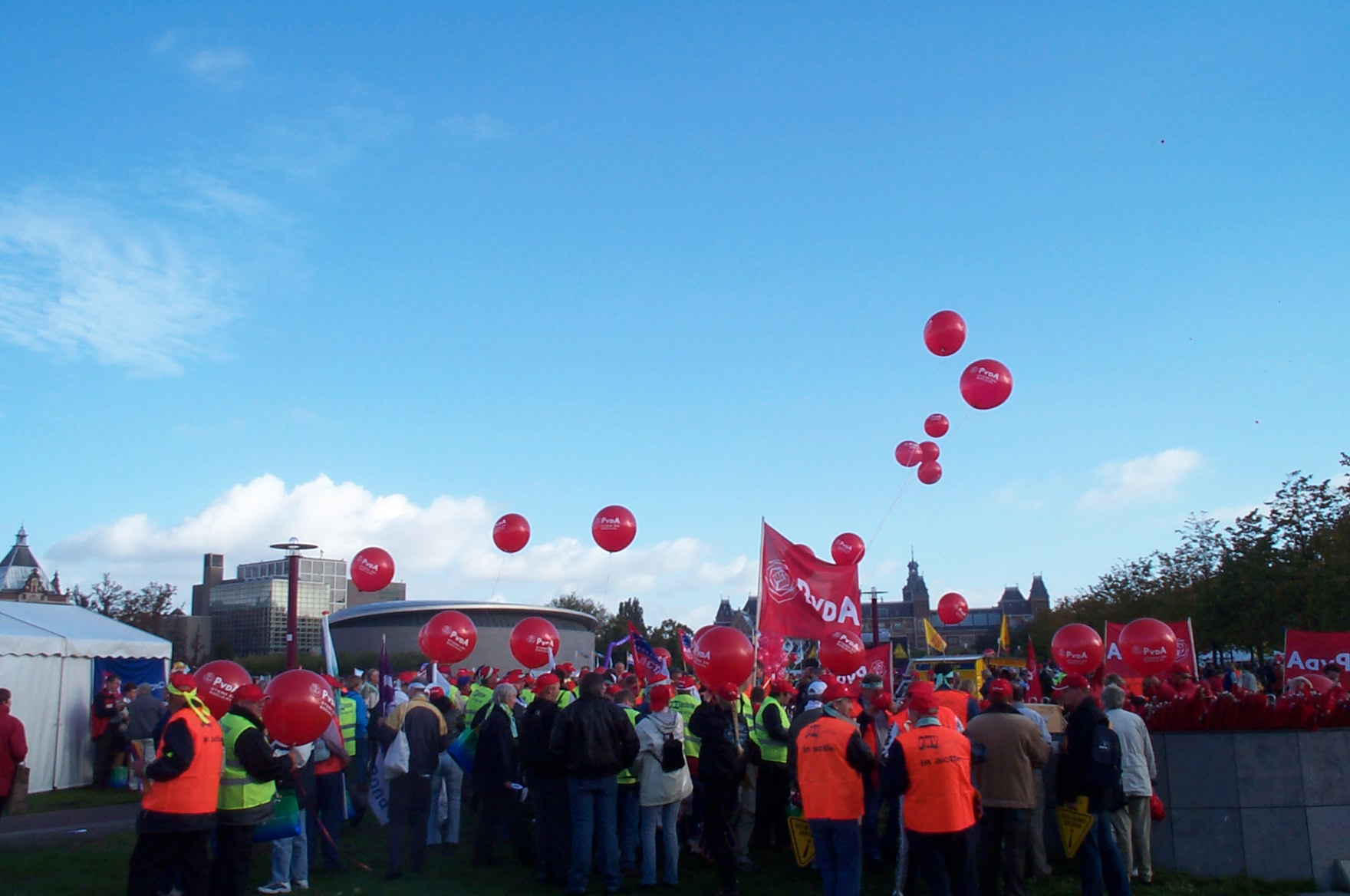
PvdA activists in an October 2004 demonstration

The highest organ of the PvdA is the Congress, formed by delegates from the municipal branches. It convenes once every year. It appoints the party board, decides the order of candidates on electoral lists for the Senate, House of Representatives and European Parliament and has the final say over the party programme. Since 2002, a referendum of all members has partially replaced the Congress. Both the lead candidate of the House of Representatives candidate list, who is the political leader of the party, and the party chairman, who leads the party organisation, are selected by such a referendum. In 2002, Wouter Bos won the PvdA leadership election.

=== Membership ===
As of 2026, PvdA has 63,909 members. They are organised in over 500 municipal branches.

=== Linked organisations ===
Rood is the party periodical. It appears eight times a year. The Young Socialists is the youth organisation of the PvdA. It is a member of Young European Socialists and the International Union of Socialist Youth. They publish the periodical Lava.

The scientific institute (or think tank) of the PvdA is the Wiardi Beckman Foundation. It publishes the periodical Socialisme & Democratie. The PvdA participates in the Netherlands Institute for Multiparty Democracy, a democracy assistance organisation of seven Dutch political parties.

==== Pillarised organisations ====
During the period of strong pillarisation the PvdA had strong links with the social democratic broadcasting organisation VARA Broadcasting Association, the Dutch Association of Trade Unions, and the paper Het Vrije Volk.

=== International affiliation ===
The PvdA is a full member of the Party of European Socialists and was formerly an observer member of the Socialist International until December 2014, having previously downgraded their membership in December 2012. The PvdA joined the Progressive Alliance, a new international network for social democratic political parties, at its founding event on 22 May 2013.

=== Relationships to other parties ===
Historically, the PvdA has co-operated in cabinets with the Christian democratic Christian Democratic Appeal (CDA), Political Party of Radicals (PPR), Catholic People's Party (KVP), Anti-Revolutionary Party (ARP), Christian Historical Union (CHU) and ChristianUnion (CU) parties and the liberal parties Democrats 66 (D66) and People's Party for Freedom and Democracy (VVD). Between 1971 and 1977, PvdA was allied with D66 and the PPR. After 1977 until 1989, it was closely allied to D66. Since 2003, the relationship between the PvdA and D66 has considerably worsened, at first because PvdA was in opposition to the Second Balkenende cabinet, in which D66 had co-operated.

During the governance of the second and third Balkenende cabinet, the Socialist Party and GreenLeft were calling for closer cooperation with the PvdA, calling to form a shadow government against the Balkenende cabinet, PvdA leader Bos held this off.

The PvdA has strong ties with GreenLeft. In the 2021 Dutch cabinet formation, the parties unsuccessfully combined. Prominent members including Frans Timmermans and Marjolein Moorman have called for a deepened collaboration. A merger has also been discussed. The Wiardi Beckman Foundation has voiced its opposition to this.

Despite the fact that the two parties (PvdA and GroenLinks) separately participate in a European Political Group, Groenlinks as a member of Greens–European Free Alliance and PvdA as a member of the Party of European Socialists, the parties campaigned together as GroenLinks-PvdA for the 2024 European Parliament election.

== Election results ==
=== House of Representatives ===
Election	Lead candidate	List	Votes	%	Seats	+/–	Government
1946	Willem Drees	List	1,347,940	28.31	29 / 100	New	Coalition
1948	Willem Drees	List	1,262,888	25.61	27 / 100	▼2	Coalition (1948–1951)
1948	Willem Drees	List	1,262,888	25.61	27 / 100	▼2	Coalition (1951–1952)
1952	Willem Drees	List	1,545,844	28.97	30 / 100	▲3	Coalition
1956	Willem Drees	List	1,872,201	32.69	50 / 150	▲20	Coalition (1956–1958)
1956	Willem Drees	List	1,872,201	32.69	50 / 150	▲20	Opposition (1958–1959)
1959	Jaap Burger	List	1,821,285	30.36	48 / 150	▼2	Opposition
1963	Anne Vondeling	List	1,753,025	28.01	43 / 150	▼5	Opposition (1963–1965)
1963	Anne Vondeling	List	1,753,025	28.01	43 / 150	▼5	Coalition (1965–1966)
1963	Anne Vondeling	List	1,753,025	28.01	43 / 150	▼5	Opposition (1966–1967)
1967	Joop den Uyl	List	1,620,447	23.55	37 / 150	▼6	Opposition
1971	Joop den Uyl	List	1,554,733	24.60	39 / 150	▲2	Opposition
1972	Joop den Uyl	List	2,021,454	27.34	43 / 150	▲4	Coalition
1977	Joop den Uyl	List	2,813,793	33.83	53 / 150	▲10	Opposition
1981	Joop den Uyl	List	2,458,452	28.29	44 / 150	▼9	Coalition
1982	Joop den Uyl	List	2,503,517	30.40	47 / 150	▲3	Opposition
1986	Joop den Uyl	List	3,051,678	33.23	52 / 150	▲5	Opposition
1989	Wim Kok	List	2,832,739	31.91	49 / 150	▼3	Coalition
1994	Wim Kok	List	2,153,135	23.97	37 / 150	▼12	Coalition
1998	Wim Kok	List	2,494,555	28.98	45 / 150	▲8	Coalition
2002	Ad Melkert	List	1,436,023	15.11	23 / 150	▼22	Opposition
2003	Wouter Bos	List	2,631,363	27.26	42 / 150	▲19	Opposition
2006	Wouter Bos	List	2,085,077	21.19	33 / 150	▼9	Coalition (2007–2010)
2006	Wouter Bos	List	2,085,077	21.19	33 / 150	▼9	Opposition (2010)
2010	Job Cohen	List	1,848,805	19.63	30 / 150	▼3	Opposition
2012	Diederik Samsom	List	2,340,750	24.84	38 / 150	▲8	Coalition
2017	Lodewijk Asscher	List	599,699	5.70	9 / 150	▼29	Opposition
2021	Lilianne Ploumen	List	595,799	5.73	9 / 150	Steady	Opposition

=== Senate ===
Election	Votes	%	Seats	+/–	Ref.
1946			14 / 50	New	
1948			14 / 50	Steady	
1951			14 / 50	Steady	
1952			14 / 50	Steady	
1955			14 / 50	Steady	
Jun 1956			15 / 75	▲1	
Oct 1956			22 / 75	▲7	
1960			23 / 75	▲1	
1963			25 / 75	▲2	
1966			22 / 75	▼3	
1969			20 / 75	▼2	
1971			18 / 75	▼2	
1974			21 / 75	▲3	
1977			25 / 75	▲4	
1980			26 / 75	▲1	
1981			28 / 75	▲2	
1983			17 / 75	▼11	
1986			17 / 75	Steady	
1987			26 / 75	▲9	
1991			16 / 75	▼10	
1995			14 / 75	▼2	
1999	30.976	19.7	15 / 75	▲1	
2003	40,613	25.12	19 / 75	▲4	
2007	31,032	19.03	14 / 75	▼5	
2011	30.078	18.76	14 / 75	Steady	
2015	17,651	11.05	8 / 75	▼6	
2019	14,921	8.62	6 / 75	▼2	
2023	15,862	8.86	7 / 75	▲1	

=== European Parliament ===
Election	List	Votes	%	Seats	+/–	EP Group
1979	List	1,722,240	30.39	9 / 25	New	SOC
1984	List	1,785,165	33.70	9 / 25	0	SOC
1989	List	1,609,626	30.70	8 / 25	▼1	SOC
1994	List	945,869	22.88	8 / 31	0	PES
1999	List	712,929	20.11	6 / 31	▼2	PES
2004	List	1,124,549	23.60	7 / 27	▲1	PES
2009	List	548,691	12.05	3 / 25	▼4	S&D
2009	List	548,691	12.05	3 / 26	0	S&D
2014	List	446,763	9.40	3 / 26	0	S&D
2019	List	1,045,274	19.01	6 / 26	▲3	S&D
2019	List	1,045,274	19.01	6 / 29	0	S&D

== See also ==
- Leader of the Labour Party (Netherlands)
