= Rutte cabinet =

Rutte cabinet may refer to:

- First Rutte cabinet, a Dutch cabinet (2010–2012)
- Second Rutte cabinet, a Dutch cabinet (2012–2017)
- Third Rutte cabinet, a Dutch cabinet (2017–2021)
- Fourth Rutte cabinet, a Dutch cabinet (2022–2024)
