= Melanie Maas Geesteranus =

Dutch politician and businesswoman

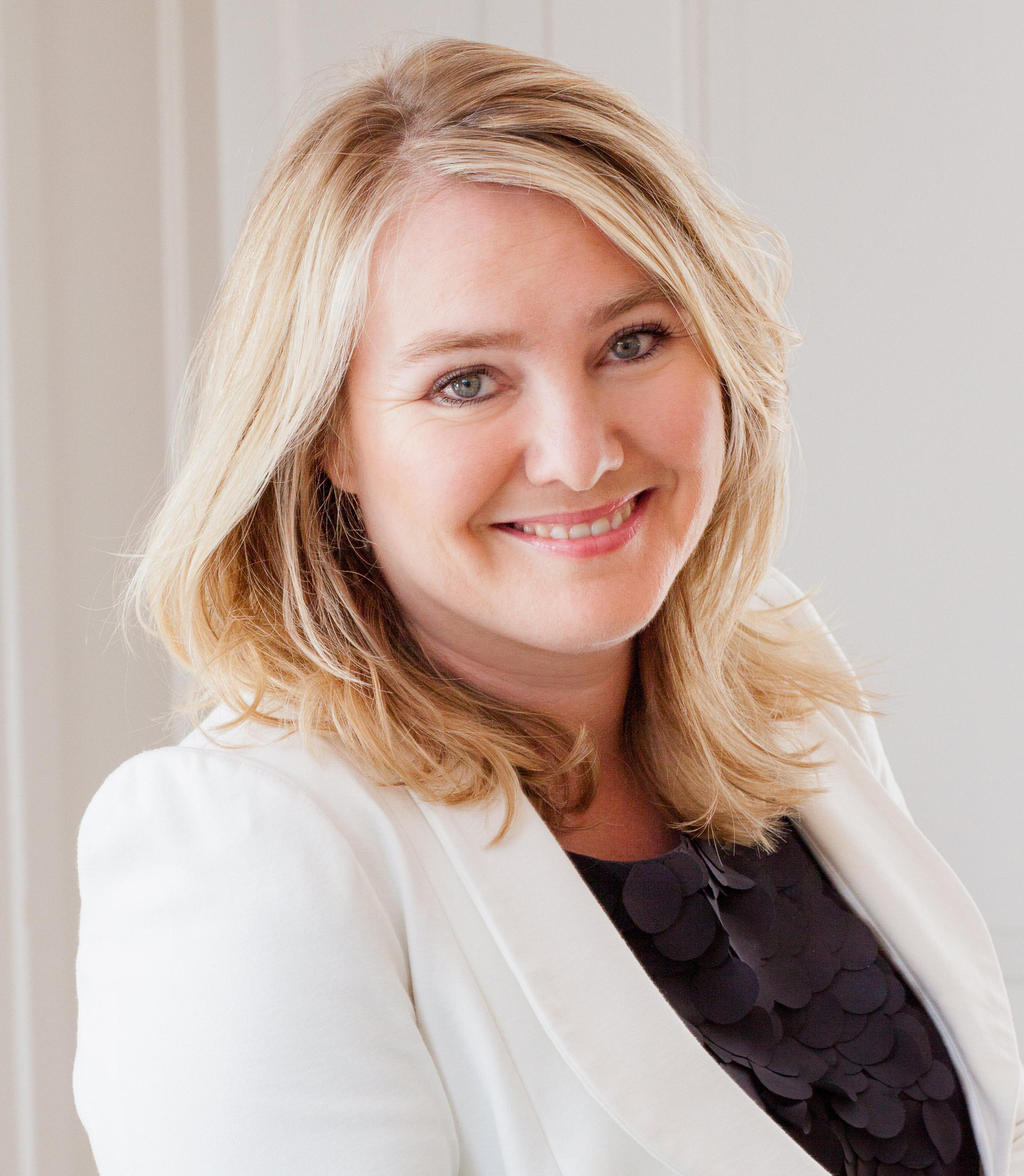
- Maas Geesteranus in 2013

Minister of Infrastructure and the Environment
- In office 14 October 2010 – 26 October 2017
- Prime Minister: Mark Rutte
- Preceded by: Camiel Eurlings (as Minister of Transport and Water Management); Tineke Huizinga (as Minister of Housing, Spatial Planning and the Environment)
- Succeeded by: Cora van Nieuwenhuizen (as Minister of Infrastructure and Water Management)

State Secretary for Transport and Water Management
- In office 22 July 2002 – 22 February 2007
- Prime Minister: Jan Peter Balkenende
- Preceded by: Monique de Vries
- Succeeded by: Tineke Huizinga

Member of the House of Representatives
- In office 30 January 2003 – 27 May 2003

Personal details
- Born: Melanie Henriëtte Maas Geesteranus; 28 June 1970 (age 56) Laag-Soeren, Netherlands
- Party: People's Party for Freedom and Democracy
- Spouse: Haro Schultz van Haegen (m. 1997–2021)
- Children: 1 son and 1 daughter
- Education: Leiden University; Erasmus University Rotterdam
- Occupation: Politician · Civil servant · Management consultant · Businesswoman · Corporate director · Nonprofit director

Melanie Henriëtte Maas Geesteranus (born 28 June 1970), until 2021 known by her married name Melanie Schultz van Haegen, is a retired Dutch politician and businesswoman. A member of the People's Party for Freedom and Democracy (VVD), she served as Minister of Infrastructure and the Environment from 2010 to 2017.

== Biography ==
Maas Geesteranus attended a Gymnasium in Lisse from May 1982 until June 1988 and applied at the Leiden University in June 1988 majoring in public administration, obtaining her Bachelor's degree in July 1990 before transferring to the Erasmus University Rotterdam and graduating with a Master of Public Administration degree in July 1994. Maas Geesteranus served on the Municipal Council of Leiden from May 1994 until June 1999 and served as an Alderperson in Leiden from June 1999 until July 2002. Maas Geesteranus worked as a management consultant for B&A Group in The Hague from January 1995 until April 1997 and as a civil servant for the department of Budgetary Affairs of the Ministry of Finance from April 1997 until June 1999.

After the election of 2002 Maas Geesteranus was appointed as State Secretary for Transport and Water Management in the Cabinet Balkenende I, taking office on 22 July 2002. The Cabinet Balkenende I fell just four months later on 16 October 2002, and continued to serve in a demissionary capacity. Maas Geesteranus was elected as a Member of the House of Representatives after the election of 2003, taking office on 30 January 2003. Following the cabinet formation of 2003 Maas Geesteranus continued as State Secretary for Transport and Water Management in the Cabinet Balkenende II, taking office on 27 May 2003. The Cabinet Balkenende II fell on 30 June 2006, and continued to serve in a demissionary capacity until the first cabinet formation of 2006 when it was replaced by the caretaker Cabinet Balkenende III with Schultz van Haegen remaining as State Secretary for Transport and Water Management, taking office on 7 July 2006. On 9 August 2006, Schultz van Haegen announced her retirement from national politics and that she would not stand for the election of 2006. The Cabinet Balkenende III was replaced by the Cabinet Balkenende IV following the second cabinet formation of 2006 on 22 February 2007.

Schultz van Haegen retired from national politics and became active in the private sector and public sector and occupied numerous seats as a corporate director and nonprofit director on several boards of directors and supervisory boards (Achmea, Institute for Sound and Vision and the World Population Foundation). After the election of 2010 Schultz van Haegen was appointed as Minister of Infrastructure and the Environment in the Cabinet Rutte I, taking office 14 October 2010. The Cabinet Rutte I fell on 23 April 2012, and continued to serve in a demissionary capacity. In April 2012, Schultz van Haegen announced that she would not stand for the election of 2012. Following the cabinet formation of 2012 Schultz van Haegen remained as Minister of Infrastructure and the Environment in the Cabinet Rutte II, taking office on 5 November 2012. On 6 May 2016, Schultz van Haegen announced her retirement from national politics for a second time and that she would not stand for the election of 2017. Following the cabinet formation of 2017, Schultz van Haegen per his own request, asked not to be considered for a cabinet post in the new cabinet, the Cabinet Rutte II was replaced by the Cabinet Rutte III on 26 October 2017.

Schultz van Haegen retired from national politics and returned to the private sector and public sector, in March 2018, Schultz van Haegen was named as Chief executive officer (CEO) and Chairwoman of the Board of directors of the Porticus Foundation, serving since 1 April 2018.

== Decorations ==
Honours
Ribbon bar	Honour	Country	Date	Comment
	Officer of the Order of Orange-Nassau	Netherlands	14 February 2018	Elevated from Knight (11 April 2007)

Political offices
Preceded by Monique de Vries	State Secretary for Transport and Water Management; 2003–2007	Succeeded by Tineke Huizinga
Preceded by Camiel Eurlings as Minister of Transport and Water Management	Minister of Infrastructure and the Environment; 2010–2017	Succeeded by Cora van Nieuwenhuizen as Minister of Infrastructure and Water Management
Preceded by Tineke Huizinga as Minister of Housing, Spatial; Planning and the Environment	Minister of Infrastructure and the Environment; 2010–2017	Succeeded by Cora van Nieuwenhuizen as Minister of Infrastructure and Water Management
Non-profit organization positions
Preceded by Ed Nijpels	Chairwoman of the Supervisory board of the Institute for Sound and Vision; 2007–2010	Succeeded by Guusje ter Horst
Preceded by Bram Peper	Chairwoman of the Supervisory board of the World Population Foundation; 2008–2010	Succeeded by Jet Bussemaker
Preceded by George Kabalt	CEO and Chairwoman of the Board of directors of the Porticus Foundation; 2018–present	Incumbent
