= Fred Teeven =

Dutch politician (born 1958)

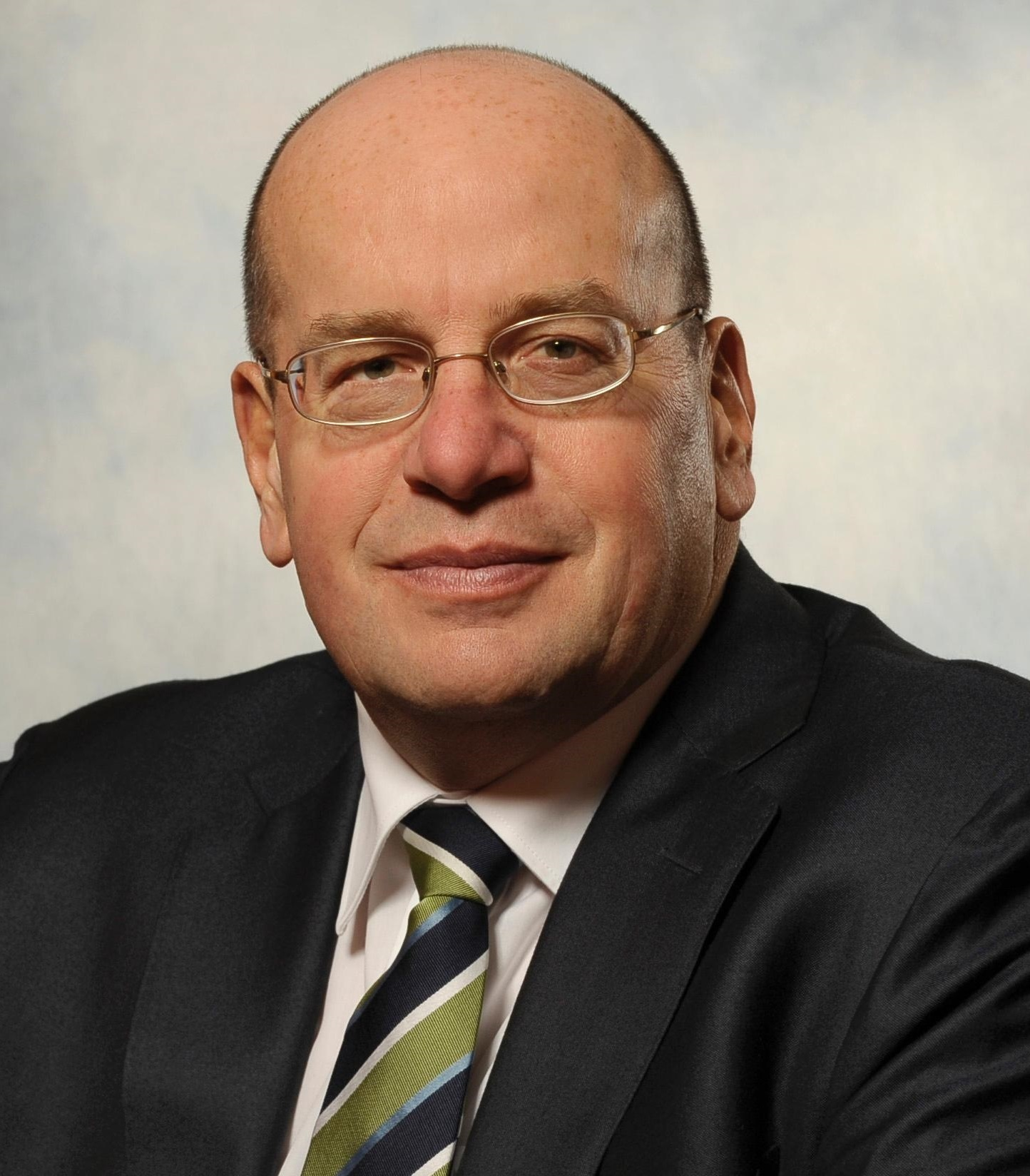
- Teeven in 2013

State Secretary for Security and Justice
- In office 14 October 2010 – 10 March 2015
- Prime Minister: Mark Rutte
- Preceded by: Nebahat Albayrak
- Succeeded by: Klaas Dijkhoff

Member of the House of Representatives
- In office 26 March 2015 – 23 March 2017
- In office 20 September 2012 – 5 November 2012
- In office 30 November 2006 – 14 October 2010
- In office 23 May 2002 – 30 January 2003

Leader of Livable Netherlands in the House of Representatives
- In office 23 May 2002 – 30 January 2003
- Preceded by: Office established
- Succeeded by: Office discontinued

Leader of Livable Netherlands
- In office 10 March 2002 – 30 December 2002
- Preceded by: Pim Fortuyn
- Succeeded by: Haitske van de Linde

Personal details
- Born: Fredrik Teeven; 5 August 1958 (age 68) Haarlem, Netherlands
- Party: People's Party for Freedom and Democracy (since 2005)
- Other political affiliations: People's Party for Freedom and Democracy (until 2002); Livable Netherlands (2002–2004)
- Children: 2
- Education: Vrije Universiteit Amsterdam (Bachelor of Laws, Master of Laws); University of Twente (Master of Science in Project Management)
- Occupation: Politician · Civil servant · Jurist · Prosecutor · Tax collector · Consultant · Bus driver

Fredrik "Fred" Teeven (born 5 August 1958) is a Dutch jurist, bus driver and former politician and prosecutor. A member of the People's Party for Freedom and Democracy (VVD), he served as State Secretary at the Ministry of Security and Justice from 2010 until his resignation in 2015 alongside that of Minister Ivo Opstelten.

Teeven served as a member of the House of Representatives and parliamentary leader of the Livable Netherlands party in the House of Representatives from 23 May 2002 until 30 January 2003. In 2003 he rejoined the People's Party for Freedom and Democracy and after general election of 2006 again served as a member of the House of Representatives from 30 November 2006 until 14 October 2010 when he became State Secretary for Security and Justice under the First and Second Rutte cabinets. After the general election of 2012 he served as a member of the House of Representatives from 20 September 2012 until 5 November 2012 and again from 26 March 2015 until 23 March 2017.

== Early career ==
Teeven was born in the province of North Holland. He studied law at the Vrije Universiteit Amsterdam and public management at the University of Twente. Working first as a tax collector he became a prosecutor, becoming known as a "crimefighter", since he led many investigations into organised crime. Teeven was involved in the prosecutions of Dési Bouterse, Mink Kok, Johan Verhoek, as well as Willem Holleeder.

== Politics ==
In 2002, Teeven succeeded Pim Fortuyn as frontrunner (lijsttrekker) of Livable Netherlands (Leefbaar Nederland). From 23 May 2002 to 30 January 2003, he was parliamentary leader of Livable Netherlands in the House of Representatives and also a member of the House of Representatives from 23 May 2002 to 30 January 2003. After he found out he would not be frontrunner in the 2003 election, he quit the party and returned to his former post of public prosecutor.

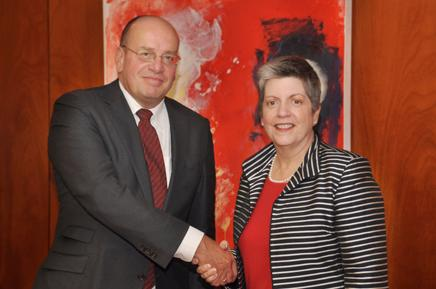
Fred Teeven and then United States Secretary of Homeland Security Janet Napolitano in 2011

In 2006, Teeven announced his return to politics, this time for the People's Party for Freedom and Democracy (VVD). For the general election of 2006, he was sixth on the candidate list for the VVD; he was elected into House of Representatives on 30 November 2006. He was the main spokesperson for justice policy.

For the general election of 2010 he was third on the candidate list for the VVD. After the cabinet formation of 2010 for the First Rutte cabinet, Teeven became State Secretary for Security and Justice taking office on 14 October 2010 and resigned the same day as a member of the House of Representatives. On 5 November 2012, he continued as State Secretary for Security and Justice under the Second Rutte cabinet. Meanwhile, he was a member of the House of Representatives again from 20 September 2012 to 5 November 2012. As State Secretary for Security and Justice he was tasked with dealing with prevention, family law, youth justice, in addition to copyright law.

On 10 March 2015 Justice Minister Ivo Opstelten resigned together with Teeven after the former had informed the House of Representatives wrongly in the early 2000s on a deal made by Teeven as a state prosecutor in 1994. The deal concerned money paid to a drug trafficker whose money had been seized and received compensation after the origin of the money could not be proved to be illegal. Opstelten had mentioned to the House of Representatives a lower amount than the one that was actually paid, as well as that the receipt of the transaction had gone missing, while it later surfaced. In the wake of this affair, House Speaker Anouchka van Miltenburg, a member of the same political party as both Teeven and Opstelten, resigned on 12 December 2015 when it became clear she had suppressed two letters of a whistleblower from the justice ministry who had already mentioned the right details on the deal, by putting the letters through the shredder. After resigning as State Secretary Teeven served as member of the House of Representatives between 26 March 2015 and 23 March 2017.

Teeven currently works as a part-time bus driver for public transportation company Connexxion in North Holland and as a consultant for public relations and cybercrime. Amid the 2022 Russian invasion of Ukraine, as a bus driver, Teeven drove Ukrainian conflict orphans to the Netherlands.

== Decorations ==
Honours
Ribbon bar	Honour	Country	Date	Comment
	Knight of the Order of Orange-Nassau	Netherlands	9 April 2015	

Party political offices
Preceded by Pim Fortuyn; 2002	Lijsttrekker of Livable Netherlands; 2002	Succeeded by Haitske van de Linde; 2003
Preceded by Pim Fortuyn	Leader of Livable Netherlands; 2002	Succeeded by Haitske van de Linde
Preceded by Office established	Parliamentary leader of Livable Netherlands in the House of Representatives; 2002–2003	Succeeded by Office discontinued
Political offices
Preceded by Nebahat Albayrak as State Secretary for Justice	State Secretary for Security and Justice; 2010–2015	Succeeded by Klaas Dijkhoff
