= Nebahat Albayrak =

Dutch politician

Her Excellency Nebahat Albayrak
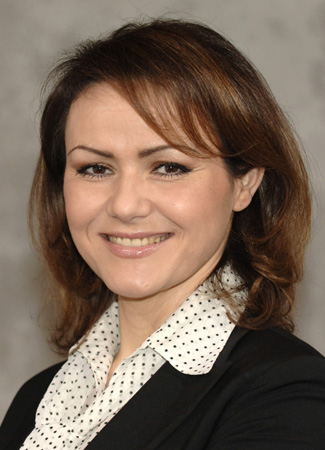
- Albayrak in 2007

State Secretary for Justice
- In office 22 February 2007 – 23 February 2010
- Prime Minister: Jan Peter Balkenende
- Preceded by: Ella Kalsbeek (2002)
- Succeeded by: Fred Teeven as State Secretary for Security and Justice

Member of the House of Representatives
- In office 2 August 2011 – 20 September 2012
- In office 12 May 2010 – 12 April 2011
- In office 19 May 1999 – 22 February 2007

Personal details
- Born: Nebahat Albayrak; 10 April 1968 (age 58) Şarkışla, Turkey
- Citizenship: Netherlands; Turkey
- Party: Labour Party
- Education: Leiden University

Nebahat Albayrak (born 10 April 1968) is a retired Turkish–Dutch politician of the Labour Party (PvdA) and jurist. She is a corporate director at Upstream International a division of Royal Dutch Shell since 5 November 2012.

== Biography ==
Albayrak moved to the Netherlands in 1970. In 1993, Albayrak graduated from Leiden University in international and European law. As part of her degree, she also attended lectures in Ankara at Ankara University and the Institut d'Études Françaises, and in Paris at the Institut d'Études Politiques.

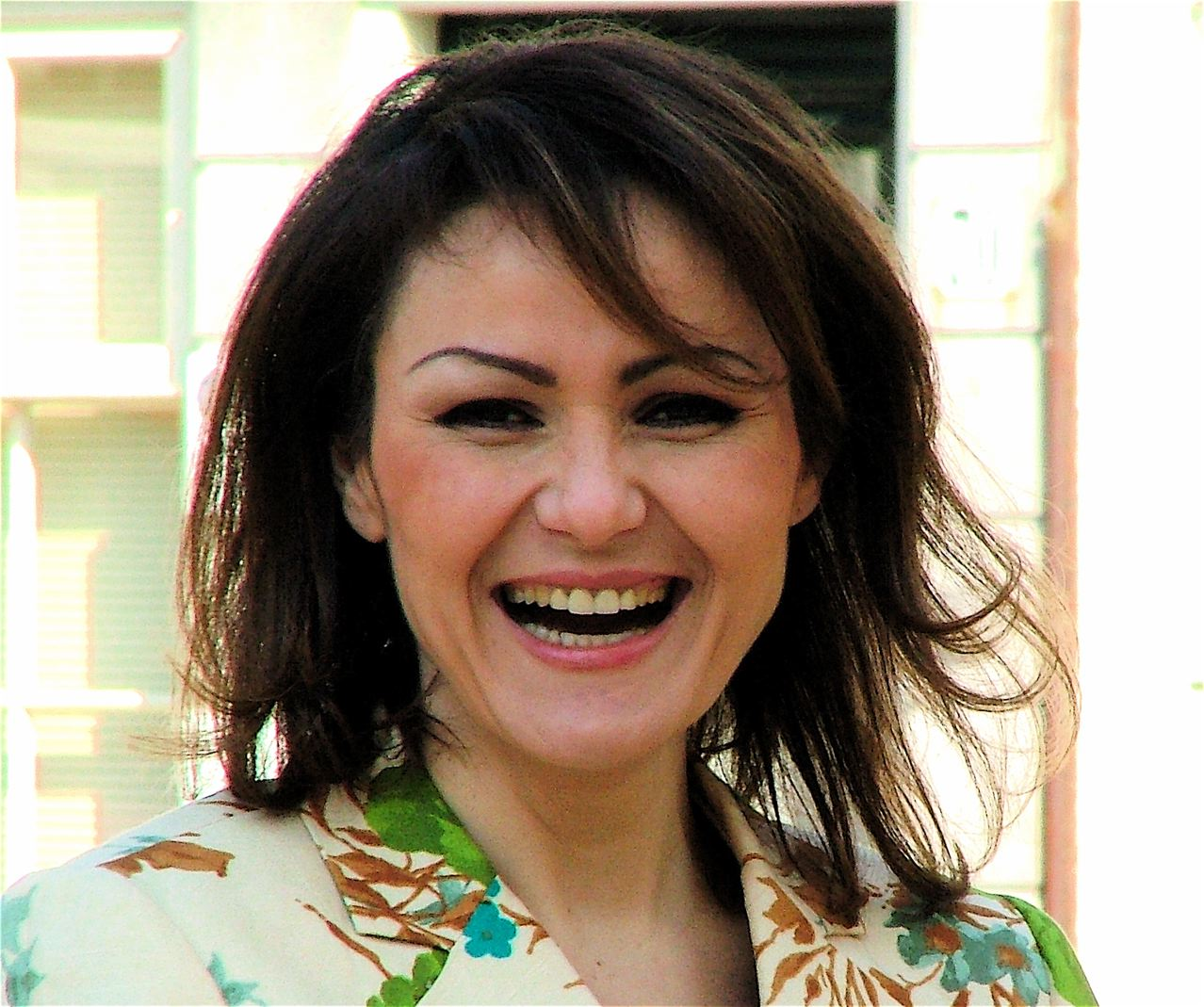
Albayrak in 2007

She worked at the Ministry of the Interior and Kingdom Relations from 1993 to 1998. From 1998 to 2007, she was a member of the Dutch House of Representatives.

On 22 February 2007, Nebahat Albayrak was installed as State Secretary (junior minister) for Justice in the fourth Balkenende cabinet. She and Ahmed Aboutaleb are the first Muslims in a Dutch cabinet. The right-wing Party for Freedom tried to prevent the installation of both Nebahat Albayrak and Ahmed Aboutaleb. The party also tried to pass a motion of no confidence in parliament directed against all parliamentarians or executive branch politicians with dual citizenship, claiming these politicians have a loyalty conflict or have the appearance of having one. Nebahat Albayrak has a Turkish and a Dutch passport. The motion was rejected by the House of Representatives, since no other party than the Party for Freedom supported it.

== Decorations ==
Honours
Ribbon bar	Honour	Country	Date	Comment
	Knight of the Order of Orange-Nassau	Netherlands	3 December 2010	

Political offices
Vacant Title last held by Ella Kalsbeek	State Secretary for Justice; 2007–2010	Succeeded by Fred Teeven as State Secretary for Security and Justice
