= Halbe Zijlstra =

Dutch politician

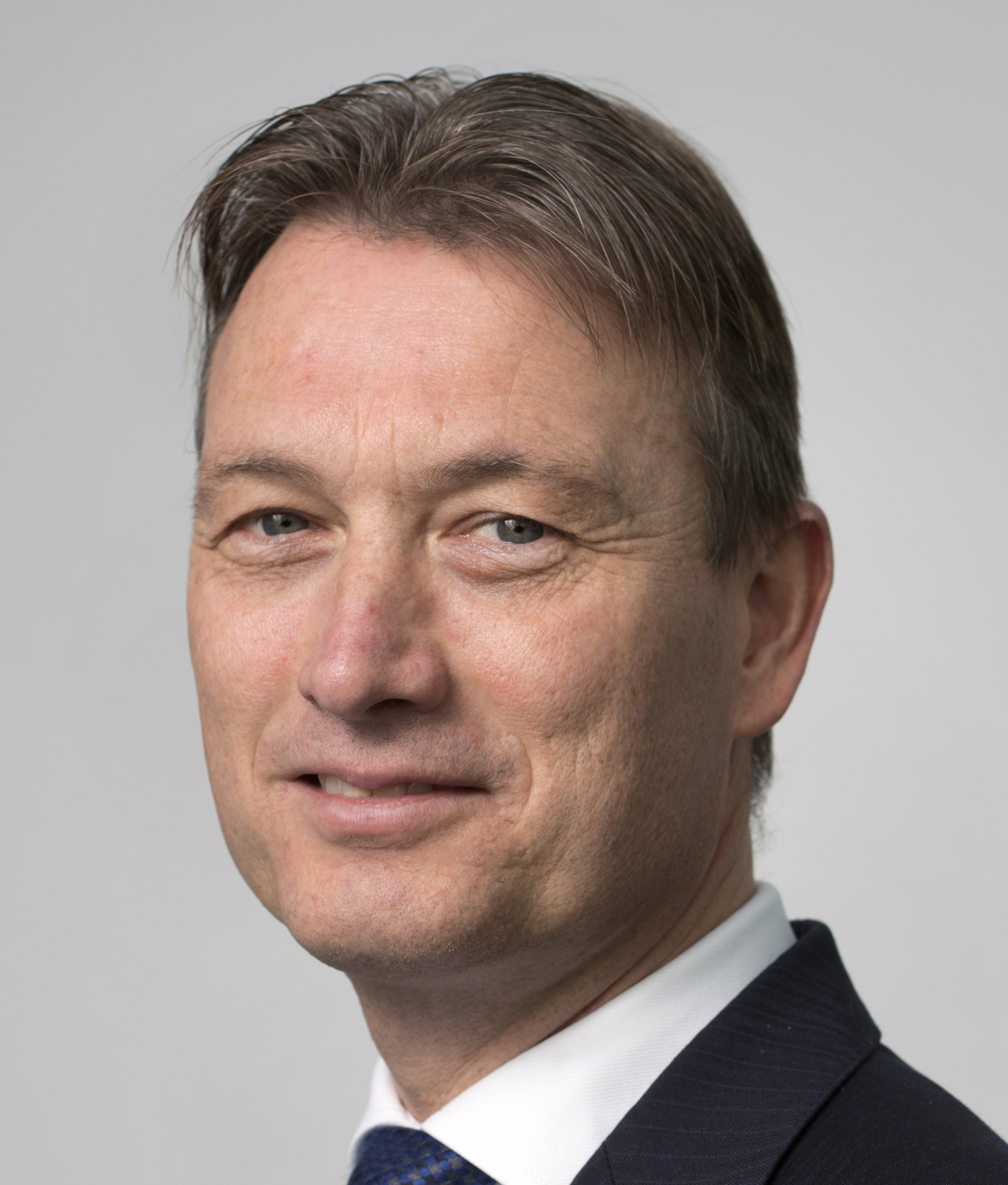
- Zijlstra in 2017

Minister of Foreign Affairs
- In office 26 October 2017 – 13 February 2018
- Prime Minister: Mark Rutte
- Preceded by: Bert Koenders
- Succeeded by: Sigrid Kaag (ad interim)

Parliamentary leader in the House of Representatives
- In office 13 October 2017 – 25 October 2017
- Preceded by: Mark Rutte
- Succeeded by: Klaas Dijkhoff
- In office 1 November 2012 – 16 March 2017
- Preceded by: Mark Rutte
- Succeeded by: Mark Rutte
- Parliamentary group: People's Party for Freedom and Democracy

State Secretary for Education, Culture and Science
- In office 14 October 2010 – 5 November 2012
- Prime Minister: Mark Rutte
- Preceded by: Marja van Bijsterveldt
- Succeeded by: Sander Dekker

Member of the House of Representatives
- In office 20 September 2012 – 26 October 2017
- In office 30 November 2006 – 14 October 2010

Personal details
- Born: Halbe Zijlstra; 21 January 1969 (age 57) Oosterwolde, Netherlands
- Party: People's Party for Freedom and Democracy (since 1994)
- Spouse: Ingrid de Bondt (m. 1999)
- Children: 1 son
- Education: University of Groningen
- Occupation: Politician · Management consultant

Halbe Zijlstra (Dutch pronunciation: [ˈɦɑlbə ˈzɛilstraː]; born 21 January 1969) is a retired Dutch politician who served as Minister of Foreign Affairs from 26 October 2017 to 13 February 2018 in the Third Rutte cabinet. He is a member of the People's Party for Freedom and Democracy (VVD).

Zijlstra, a management consultant by occupation, was elected as a member of the House of Representatives after general election of 2006 serving from 30 November 2006 until 14 October 2010 when he was appointed as State Secretary for Education, Culture and Science in the First Rutte cabinet, serving until 5 November 2012. Following the election of 2012, he returned to the House of Representatives, serving from 20 September 2012 until 26 October 2017; he was chosen as parliamentary leader, serving from 1 November 2012 until 23 March 2017. He served as Minister of Foreign Affairs from 26 October 2017 to 13 February 2018.

== Early life, education, and early career ==
Halbe Zijlstra was born on 21 January 1969 in Oosterwolde in the Netherlands. His father was a police detective. He attended secondary education at vwo level and studied sociology at the University of Groningen, after which he worked for several companies.

== Political career ==
Zijlstra has been a member of the People's Party for Freedom and Democracy since 1 February 1994. He served as a member of the municipal council of Utrecht from 1998 to 2001, and again from 2003 to 2006.

Zijlstra was elected to the House of Representatives in the 2006 general election, taking his seat on 30 November. In the House, he was his party's spokesman on care, energy, sports, higher education and sciences and biotechnology. Shortly after the election, he introduced a bill with measures to tackle football hooligans together with Labour Party MP Hans Spekman, and in 2007 the bill was adopted by Guusje ter Horst, who had become Minister of the Interior and Kingdom Relations in that year.

=== State secretary for Education, Culture and Science ===
On 14 October 2010, Zijlstra was appointed as State secretary for Education, Culture and Science in the newly installed First Rutte cabinet. In this position, he was responsible for a broad portfolio of policy areas within the Ministry of Education, Culture and Science, including higher education, science and knowledge, the training and labour conditions of teachers, culture and cultural heritage. In his two-year term, Zijlstra initiated several changes in higher education policy, including the introduction of scholarships more favourable for long-term students and the creation of the possibility to prolong one's study in exceptional cases in 2011, and placing base scholarships for Master students under the loan system in 2012. Additionally, Zijlstra initiated budget cuts in the culture sector, sharpening the conditions necessary to be eligible for government subsidies, and merging several cultural funds. These measures saved a total of 200 million euros and caused the collapse of the Dutch music school system.

=== Parliamentary leader ===
After Rutte's first cabinet lost a motion of no confidence in 2012 and new elections were held, Zijlstra returned to the House of Representatives as chairman of his party's parliamentary group. In 2016, he announced he would not be available for a second term as parliamentary leader after the 2017 general election, but that he aspired to enter the cabinet as a minister.

=== Minister of Foreign Affairs ===
On 26 October 2017, Zijlstra became Minister of Foreign Affairs in the third government of Prime Minister Mark Rutte.

In response to the Turkish invasion of northern Syria aimed at ousting U.S.-backed Syrian Kurds from the enclave of Afrin, Zijlstra said that Turkey had the right to defend itself and its border, but at the same time pleaded with Turkey to show restraint.

In February 2018, he admitted that he lied about meeting with Russian president Vladimir Putin in 2006, during his earlier career. While speaking at a VVD conference in 2016, Zijlstra said that he heard Putin speaking about 'Great Russia' in 2006, suggesting imperialistic ambitions. He said to a newspaper that he visited Putin in his home in 2006. Putin spoke about 'Great Russia', and when asked what he meant with that term, he responded: "Russia, Belarus, Ukraine and the Baltic States. And oh yes, Kazakhstan was 'nice to have'," Zijlstra said. In 2018, he corrected that statement that a source had told him about these alleged statements. "The geopolitical meaning of those words was and is great. I therefore thought it was politically important to make these statements public. The source that told me about Putin's quotation confirmed the events to the Volkskrant, and appreciates the fact that I guarantee anonymity." Former Shell CEO Jeroen van der Veer, who attended several talks with Putin, is the source of the story. Van der Veer told the events to Zijlstra in 2014 but clarified in an e-mail to de Volkskrant that Putin's 2006 remarks were "meant historically" and "not by himself" interpreted in the sense of "aggression".

On 13 February 2018, Zijlstra announced his resignation as Minister of Foreign Affairs in an address to the House of Representatives.

== Political positions ==
In 2015, Zijlstra authored an op-ed for the NRC Handelsblad daily in which he criticized the Iran nuclear deal framework as "a historical error," a view that echoed Israel’s.

Following the United Kingdom's referendum on European Union membership referendum in 2016, Zijlstra noted that Britain was the biggest country in a free-market, antifederalist camp that also includes the Netherlands, Denmark and Sweden. He commented: "If the British leave, we’ll have lost an important partner and protectionist spirits will get a louder voice."

== Personal life ==
Zijlstra resides in Wassenaar, a town just north of The Hague. He has been an active member of a carrier pigeon club.

Party political offices
Preceded by Mark Rutte	Parliamentary leader of the People's Party for Freedom and Democracy in the House of Representatives; 2012–2017; 2017	Succeeded by Mark Rutte
Preceded by Mark Rutte	Parliamentary leader of the People's Party for Freedom and Democracy in the House of Representatives; 2012–2017; 2017	Succeeded by Klaas Dijkhoff
Political offices
Preceded by Marja van Bijsterveldt	State Secretary for Education, Culture and Science; 2010–2012	Succeeded by Sander Dekker
Preceded by Bert Koenders	Minister of Foreign Affairs; 2017–2018	Succeeded by Sigrid Kaag; Ad interim
