= Klaas Dijkhoff =

Dutch politician (born 1981)

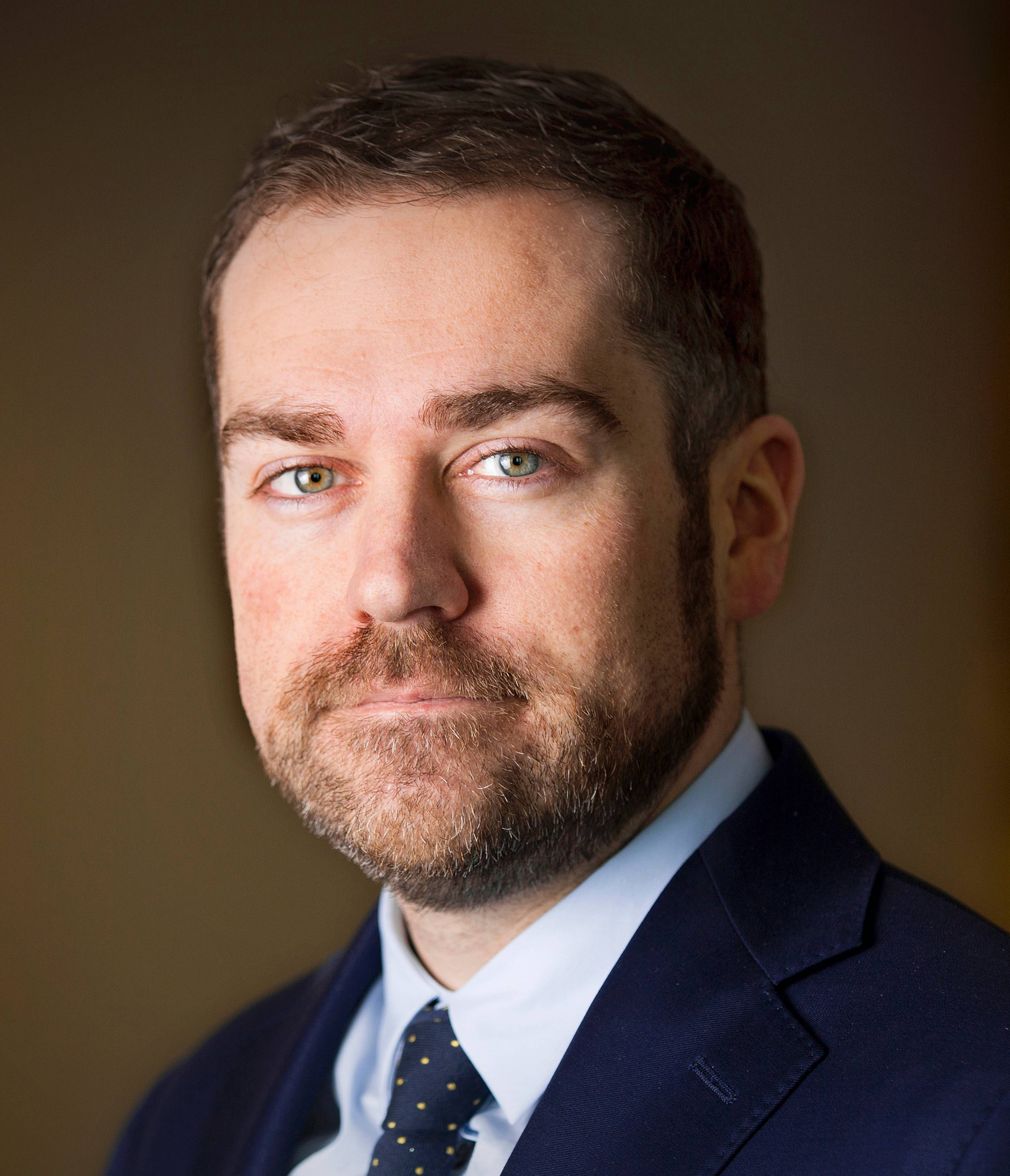
- Dijkhoff in 2015

Parliamentary leader in the House of Representatives
- In office 26 October 2017 – 18 March 2021
- Preceded by: Halbe Zijlstra
- Succeeded by: Mark Rutte
- Parliamentary group: People's Party for Freedom and Democracy

Minister of Defence
- In office 4 October 2017 – 26 October 2017
- Prime Minister: Mark Rutte
- Preceded by: Jeanine Hennis-Plasschaert
- Succeeded by: Ank Bijleveld

State Secretary for Security and Justice
- In office 20 March 2015 – 4 October 2017
- Prime Minister: Mark Rutte
- Preceded by: Fred Teeven
- Succeeded by: Mark Harbers

Member of the House of Representatives
- In office 23 March 2017 – 31 March 2021
- In office 17 June 2010 – 20 March 2015

Personal details
- Born: Klaas Henricus Dominicus Maria Dijkhoff; 13 January 1981 (age 45) Soltau, West Germany
- Party: People's Party for Freedom and Democracy (since 1998)
- Education: Tilburg University (LLM, MPhil, PhD)
- Occupation: Politician · Jurist · Legal educator · Researcher · Consultant

Klaas Henricus Dominicus Maria Dijkhoff (born 13 January 1981) is a Dutch legal scholar and politician who led the People's Party for Freedom and Democracy in the House of Representatives from 2017 to 2021. He previously was Minister of Defence (2017) and State Secretary for Security and Justice (2015–2017).

A jurist by occupation, Dijkhoff resides in Breda. He was elected as a member of the House of Representatives in the 2010 general election. After the resignation of Fred Teeven, he was appointed to succeed him and resigned as a parliamentarian the same day he took office as State Secretary at the Ministry of Security and Justice in the Second Rutte cabinet on 20 March 2015. After the resignation of Minister of Defence Jeanine Hennis-Plasschaert, Dijkhoff was nominated to serve out the remainder of her term in the already demissionary Second Rutte cabinet and resigned as State Secretary for Security and Justice on 4 October 2017 and served as Minister of Defence until the Third Rutte cabinet was installed on 26 October 2017.

Dijkhoff announced in October 2020 that he would retire from politics following the 2021 general election.

== Early life and education ==
Klaas Henricus Dominicus Maria Dijkhoff was born on 13 January 1981 in the town of Soltau in Germany. He is the son of officer Henricus Marikus Cornelis Dijkhoff and nurse Petronella Dominicus Maria Thijssen.

Dijkhoff went to secondary school in Eindhoven, where he did the gymnasium programme. He then studied Dutch law at the Tilburg University, where he successively obtained an LLM degree in international and European law in 2003, an MPhil degree cum laude in 2005, and a PhD degree in law of war in 2010 with his dissertation titled War, Law and Technology.

== Career ==
=== Early years ===
While writing his thesis he worked as a legal scholar at Tilburg University and Inholland University of Applied Sciences. He also had his own consultancy firm specialised in legal affairs and IT.

Dijkhoff became a member of the VVD in 1998. He held several positions within the party such as member of the election program committee in 2009–2010 and from 11 March 2010 until 7 February 2013 he was a member as well as VVD fraction leader of the municipal council of Breda.

=== House of Representatives ===
On 17 June 2010, he was elected as a member of the House of Representatives. In 2013, Dijkhoff got appointed national campaign leader for the municipal council elections of March 2014. He first became the party's spokesperson on development aid. He booked his biggest success in stopping subsidies to development organisations with a chairman earning more than €124,000.00 a year. Later on he became the spokesperson on European affairs. He was then the VVD spokesperson on matters of homeland security, public safety and police affairs.

Dijkhoff passed two motions in the House of Representatives in the battle against Jihad fighters. His motions called upon the cabinet to stop free travel to conflict zones and denationalisation of Jihad fighters. In 2013, he passed legislation through parliament making identity fraud a punishable offence.

=== Second Rutte cabinet ===
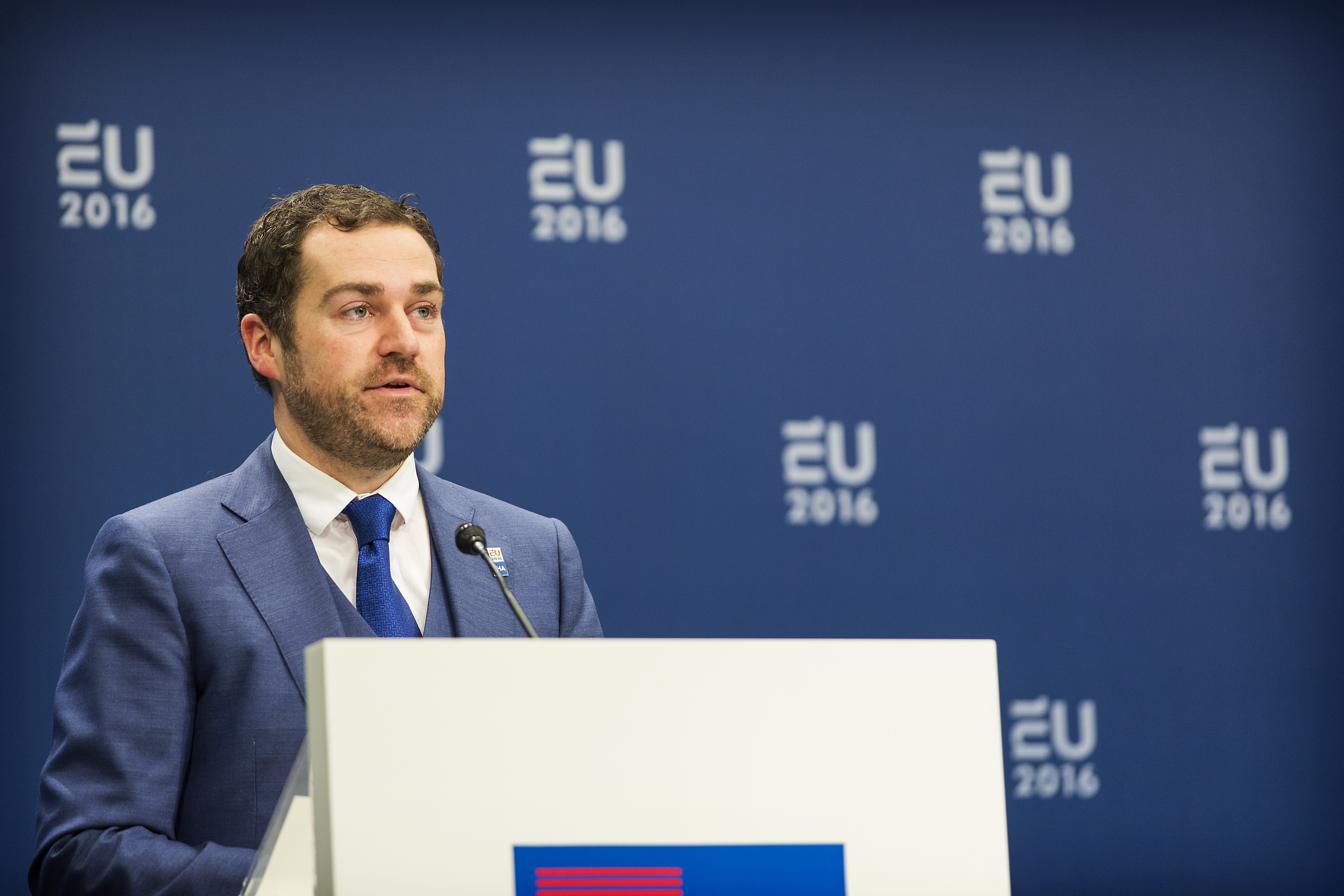
Klaas Dijkhoff in 2016

He resigned on 20 March 2015, when he became State Secretary for Security and Justice in the Second Rutte cabinet. His portfolio included Integration, Immigration, Asylum Affairs, Public Prosecution Service, Privacy Policy, Administrative Law, Family Law, Youth Justice, International Law, Prison Administration, Gambling Policy, Copyright Law, Rehabilitation, Prevention, Debt Management and Minority Affairs. On 4 October 2017, he resigned to become Minister of Defence following the resignation of Jeanine Hennis-Plasschaert.

=== Parliamentary leader ===
Dijkhoff was reelected to the House of Representatives in the general election of 2017. When the Third Rutte cabinet was inaugurated on 26 October 2017, he succeeded Rutte as leader of the People's Party for Freedom and Democracy in the House of Representatives.

=== Television ===
In 2026, he presents Klaas aan het Front in which he explores whether the Netherlands is prepared for war.

== Other activities ==
- World Economic Forum (WEF), member of the Europe Policy Group, from 2017.
- Philips Sport Vereniging (PSV), supervisory board member, from 2021.

== Personal life ==
Dijkhoff lives together with his wife in Breda. In July 2017, their daughter was born. In September 2018, he wrote an open letter to Archsbishop Wim Eijk, explaining that he was leaving the Catholic Church and revoking his membership after Eijk had criticised him in an interview.

Party political offices
Preceded by Halbe Zijlstra	Parliamentary leader of the People's Party for Freedom and Democracy in the House of Representatives; 2017–2021	Succeeded by Mark Rutte
Political offices
Preceded by Fred Teeven	State Secretary for Security and Justice; 2015–2017	Succeeded by Mark Harbers
Preceded by Jeanine Hennis-Plasschaert	Minister of Defence; 2017	Succeeded by Ank Bijleveld
