= Ella Kalsbeek =

Dutch politician (born 1955)

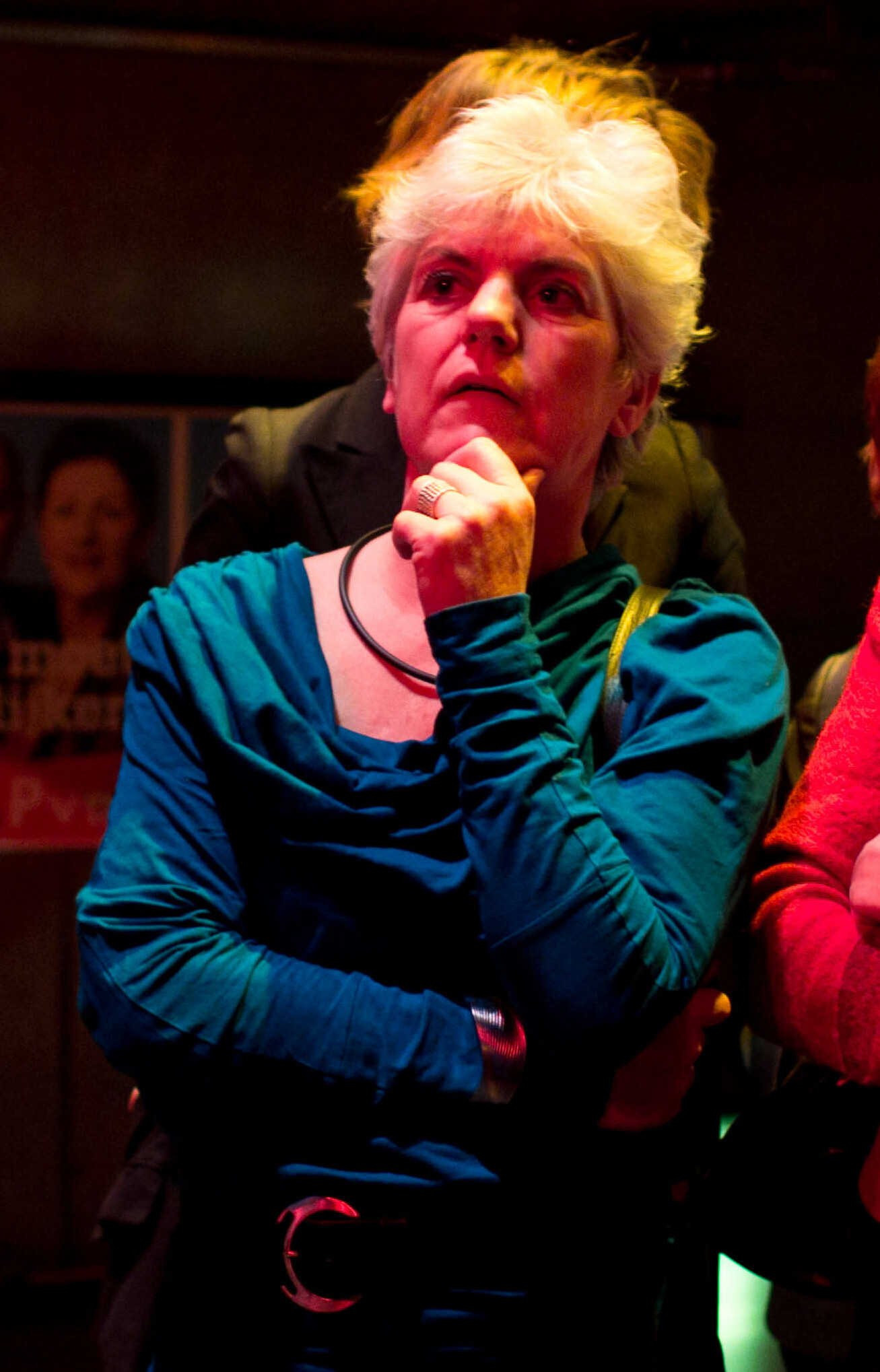
- Kalsbeek in 2011

Member of the House of Representatives of the Netherlands
- In office 23 May 2002 – 30 November 2006
- In office 14 September 1989 – 2 January 2001

State Secretary for Justice
- In office 2 January 2001 – 22 July 2002
- Monarch: Beatrix of the Netherlands
- Prime Minister: Wim Kok
- Preceded by: Job Cohen
- Succeeded by: Vacant (Nebahat Albayrak in 2007)

Personal details
- Born: Neeltje Adriana Kalsbeek; 5 January 1955 (age 71) Middelburg, Netherlands
- Party: Labour Party (Partij van de Arbeid – PvdA)
- Spouse: Jan van Zijl
- Education: Erasmus University Rotterdam (LL.M., Law)
- Occupation: Politician

Neeltje Adriana "Ella" Kalsbeek (born 5 January 1955) is a former Dutch politician. She was a member of House of Representatives of the Netherlands for the Labour Party (Partij van de Arbeid, 1989–2001, 2002–2006). She was State Secretary of Justice under Wim Kok (2001–2001). Since 1 March 2007 she is president of the board of directors of Altra College, an institute for youth care and special education in Amsterdam.
