= Second Rutte cabinet =

Cabinet of the Netherlands, 2012 to 2017

Second Rutte cabinet Rutte–Asscher cabinet
- Cabinet of the Netherlands

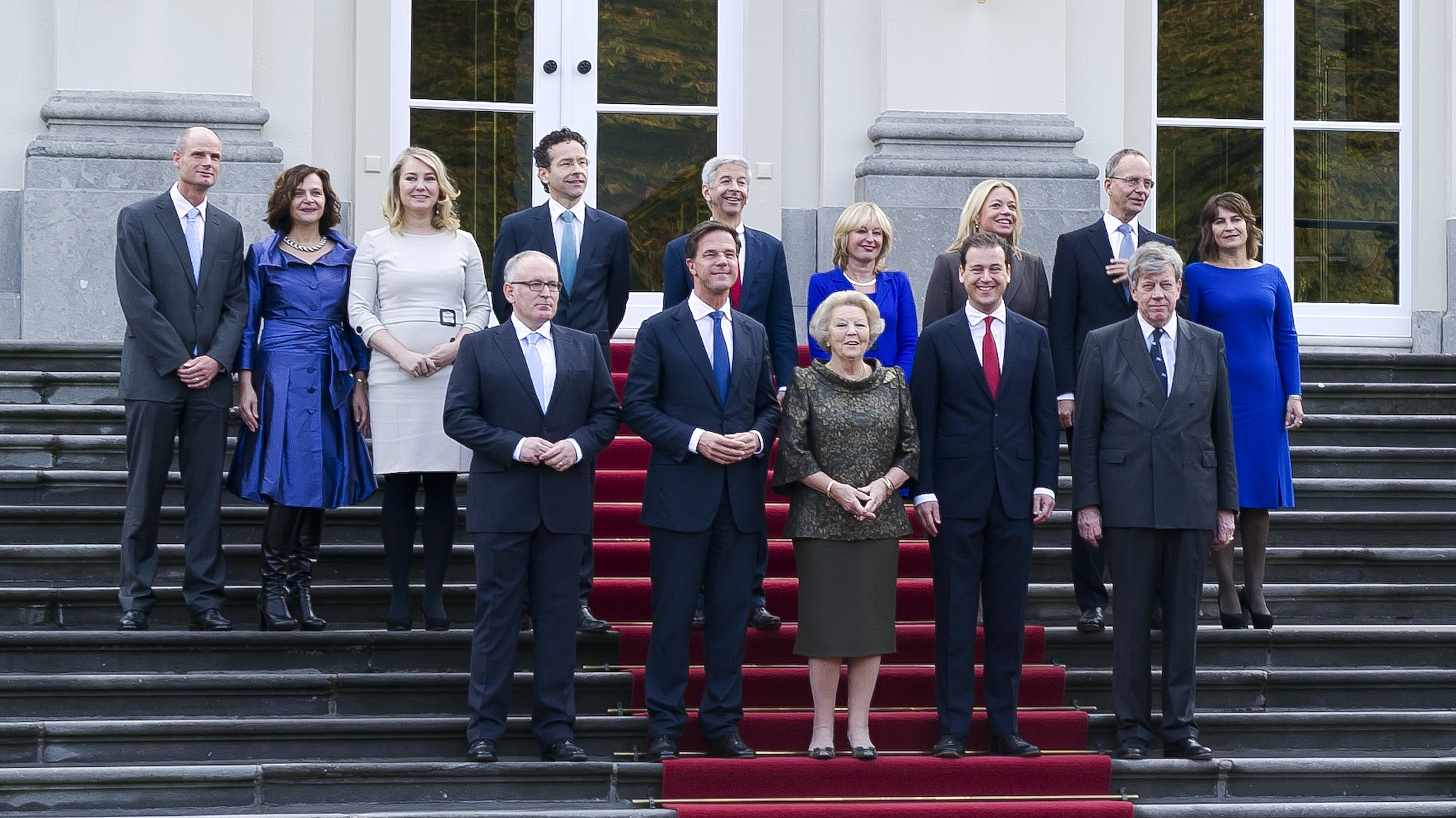
- The installation of the second Rutte cabinet on 5 November 2012
- Date formed: 5 November 2012
- Date dissolved: 26 October 2017; 4 years, 355 days in office (Demissionary from 14 March 2017)

People and organisations
- Monarch: Queen Beatrix (2012–2013); King Willem-Alexander (2013–2017)
- Prime Minister: Mark Rutte
- Deputy Prime Minister: Lodewijk Asscher
- No. of ministers: 13
- Ministers removed: 4
- Total no. of members: 17
- Member party: People's Party for Freedom and Democracy (VVD); Labour Party (PvdA)
- Status in legislature: Centrist Majority government (Grand coalition/Purple)

History
- Election: 2012 election
- Outgoing election: 2017 election
- Legislature terms: 2012–2017
- Incoming formation: 2012 formation
- Outgoing formation: 2017 formation
- Predecessor: First Rutte cabinet
- Successor: Third Rutte cabinet

The second Rutte cabinet, also called the Rutte–Asscher cabinet, was the executive branch of the Government of the Netherlands from 5 November 2012 until 26 October 2017. The cabinet was formed by the conservative-liberal People's Party for Freedom and Democracy (VVD) and the social-democratic Labour Party (PvdA) after the election of 2012. The cabinet was a centrist grand coalition and had a slim majority in the House of Representatives. VVD Leader Mark Rutte served as Prime Minister; prominent PvdA politician Lodewijk Asscher, a former alderman of Amsterdam, served as Deputy Prime Minister and Minister of Social Affairs and Employment.

The cabinet served in the middle of the 2010s. Domestically, it had to deal with the Malaysia Airlines Flight 17 disaster, in which 193 Dutch citizens on board were killed when that civilian aircraft was shot down over Ukraine by a surface-to-air missile; while internationally, climate change was a major point of attention. The cabinet suffered several major internal conflicts such as multiple cabinet resignations, including those of two Justice Ministers. The cabinet completed its entire term, and was succeeded by the third Rutte cabinet following the 2017 election. Having spent four years and 355 days in office, it is the longest-serving post-war cabinet in the Netherlands.

== Cabinet members ==
Prime minister and deputy prime minister in the second Rutte cabinet
Title	Minister			Term of office	
Title	Image	Name	Party	Start	End
Prime Minister	Mark Rutte	Mark Rutte	VVD	14 October 2010 (Note: Retained this position from the first Rutte cabinet.)	2 July 2024 (Note: Retained this position in the third Rutte cabinet.)
Deputy Prime Minister	Lodewijk Asscher	Lodewijk Asscher	PvdA	5 November 2012	26 October 2017

Ministers in the second Rutte cabinet
Title	Minister			Term of office	
Title	Image	Name	Party	Start	End
Minister of General Affairs	Mark Rutte	Mark Rutte	VVD	14 October 2010	2 July 2024
Minister of Social Affairs and Employment	Lodewijk Asscher	Lodewijk Asscher	PvdA	5 November 2012	26 October 2017
Minister of Foreign Affairs	Frans Timmermans	Frans Timmermans	PvdA	5 November 2012	17 October 2014 (Note: Appointed as European commissioner.)
Minister of Foreign Affairs	Bert Koenders	Bert Koenders	PvdA	17 October 2014	26 October 2017
Minister of the Interior and Kingdom Relations	Ronald Plasterk	Ronald Plasterk	PvdA	5 November 2012	29 June 2016 (Note: Took an extended medical leave of absence.)
Minister of the Interior and Kingdom Relations	Stef Blok	Stef Blok (acting)	VVD	29 June 2016	16 September 2016
Minister of the Interior and Kingdom Relations	Ronald Plasterk	Ronald Plasterk	PvdA	16 September 2016	26 October 2017
Minister of Security and Justice	Ivo Opstelten	Ivo Opstelten	VVD	14 October 2010	10 March 2015 (Note: Resigned from this position.)
Minister of Security and Justice	Stef Blok	Stef Blok (ad interim)	VVD	10 March 2015	20 March 2015
Minister of Security and Justice	Ard van der Steur	Ard van der Steur	VVD	20 March 2015	27 January 2017
Minister of Security and Justice	Stef Blok	Stef Blok	VVD	27 January 2017	26 October 2017
Minister of Education, Culture and Science	Jet Bussemaker	Jet Bussemaker	PvdA	5 November 2012	26 October 2017
Minister of Finance	Jeroen Dijsselbloem	Jeroen Dijsselbloem	PvdA	5 November 2012	26 October 2017
Minister of Defence	Jeanine Hennis-Plasschaert	Jeanine Hennis-Plasschaert	VVD	5 November 2012	4 October 2017
Minister of Defence	Klaas Dijkhoff	Klaas Dijkhoff	VVD	4 October 2017	26 October 2017
Minister of Infrastructure and the Environment	Melanie Schultz van Haegen	Melanie Schultz van Haegen	VVD	14 October 2010	26 October 2017
Minister of Economic Affairs	Henk Kamp	Henk Kamp	VVD	5 November 2012	26 October 2017
Minister of Health, Welfare and Sport	Edith Schippers	Edith Schippers	VVD	14 October 2010	26 October 2017
Minister for Foreign Trade and Development Cooperation (Note: Minister without portfolio within the Ministry of Foreign Affairs.)	Lilianne Ploumen	Lilianne Ploumen	PvdA	5 November 2012	26 October 2017
Minister for Housing and the Central Government Sector (Note: Minister without portfolio within the Ministry of the Interior and Kingdom Relations.)	Stef Blok	Stef Blok	VVD	5 November 2012	27 January 2017 (Note: Appointed as Minister of Security and Justice.)

State secretaries in the second Rutte cabinet
Title	Diplomatic title	State secretary			Term of office	
Title	Diplomatic title	Image	Name	Party	Start	End
State Secretary for Security and Justice	Minister for Migration	Fred Teeven	Fred Teeven	VVD	14 October 2010	10 March 2015
State Secretary for Security and Justice	Minister for Migration	Klaas Dijkhoff	Klaas Dijkhoff	VVD	20 March 2015	4 October 2017 (Note: Appointed as Minister of Defence.)
State Secretary for Education, Culture and Science		Sander Dekker	Sander Dekker	VVD	5 November 2012	26 October 2017
State Secretary for Finance		Frans Weekers	Frans Weekers	VVD	14 October 2010	30 January 2014
State Secretary for Finance		Eric Wiebes	Eric Wiebes	VVD	4 February 2014	26 October 2017
State Secretary for Infrastructure and the Environment	Minister for the Environment	Wilma Mansveld	Wilma Mansveld	PvdA	5 November 2012	28 October 2015
State Secretary for Infrastructure and the Environment	Minister for the Environment	Sharon Dijksma	Sharon Dijksma	PvdA	3 November 2015	26 October 2017
State Secretary for Economic Affairs	Minister for Agriculture	Co Verdaas	Co Verdaas	PvdA	5 November 2012	6 December 2012
State Secretary for Economic Affairs	Minister for Agriculture	Sharon Dijksma	Sharon Dijksma	PvdA	18 December 2012	3 November 2015 (Note: Appointed as State Secretary for Infrastructure and the Environment.)
State Secretary for Economic Affairs	Minister for Agriculture	Martijn van Dam	Martijn van Dam	PvdA	3 November 2015	1 September 2017
State Secretary for Social Affairs and Employment		Jetta Klijnsma	Jetta Klijnsma	PvdA	5 November 2012	26 October 2017
State Secretary for Health, Welfare and Sport		Martin van Rijn	Martin van Rijn	PvdA	5 November 2012	26 October 2017

=== Changes ===
On 6 December 2012, just 31 days after taking office, State Secretary for Economic Affairs Co Verdaas (PvdA) resigned after he was accused of making inappropriate declarations when he served as a Member of the Provincial-Executive of Gelderland. He was replaced as State Secretary for Economic Affairs by former State Secretary for Education, Culture and Science Sharon Dijksma (PvdA) on 18 December 2012.

On 17 October 2014 Minister of Foreign Affairs Frans Timmermans (PvdA) resigned after he was nominated as the next European Commissioner succeeding Neelie Kroes. He was replaced as Minister of Foreign Affairs by Special Representative of the Secretary-General for the United Nations in Mali and former Minister for Development Cooperation Bert Koenders (PvdA).

On 10 March 2015 Minister of Security and Justice Ivo Opstelten (VVD) and State Secretary for Security and Justice Fred Teeven (VVD) resigned after it was discovered that Fred Teeven when he served as a Prosecutor authorized the return of 4.7 million guilders to convicted drugs dealer Cees H. in 2000 without the knowledge of his superior or the tax office.

On 4 October 2017 Minister of Defence Jeanine Hennis-Plasschaert (VVD) resigned following a critical report by the Dutch Safety Board into the investigation of the accidental deaths of two Army soldiers who died following the use of old ammunition during a Mortar test during the United Nations Multidimensional Integrated Stabilization Mission in Mali. She was replaced as Minister of Defence by State Secretary for Security and Justice Klaas Dijkhoff (VVD) who served out the remaining three weeks before the installation of the new cabinet.
