= 2012 Dutch cabinet formation =

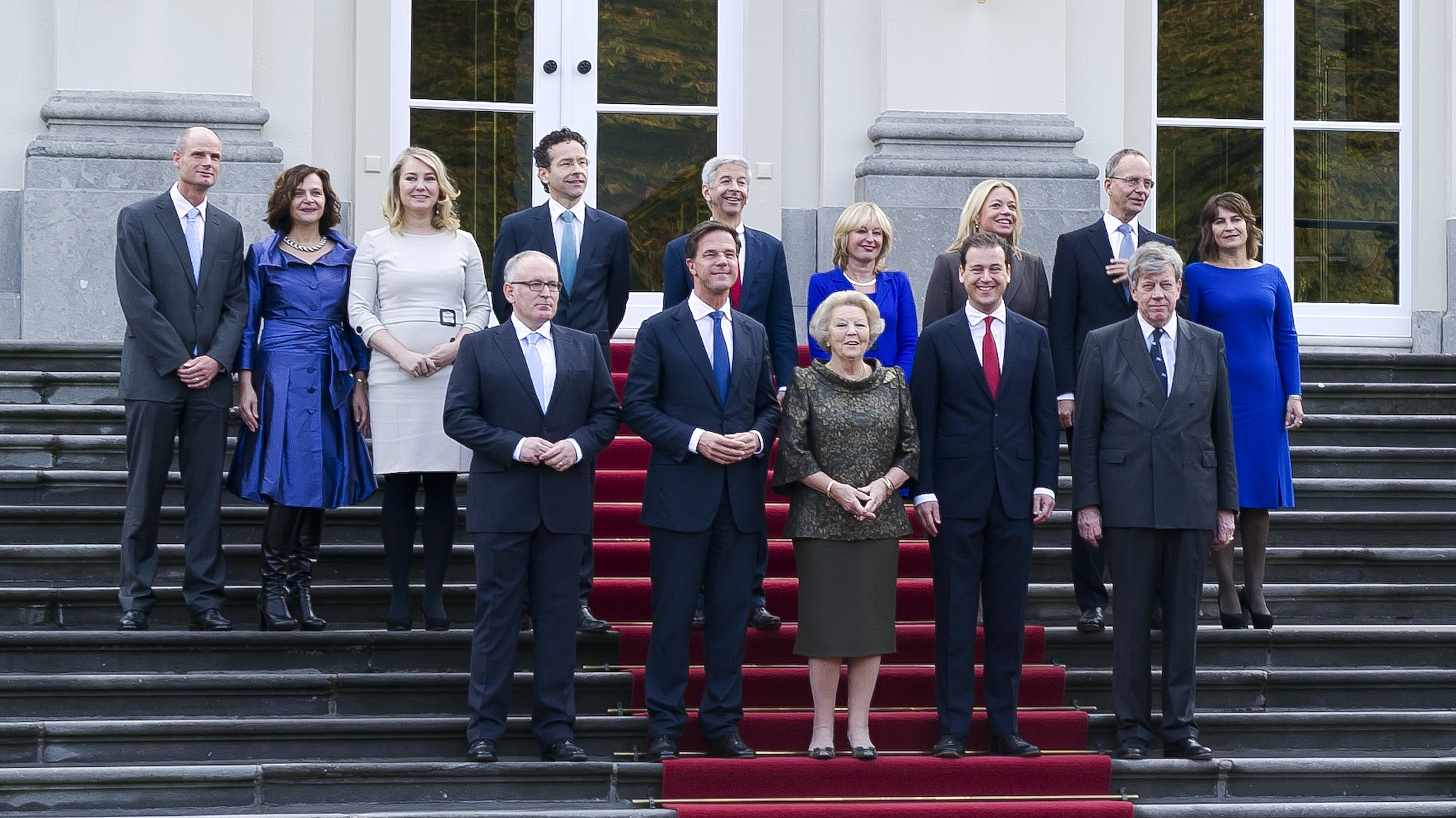
The bordes scene of the ministers of the Second Rutte cabinet with Queen Beatrix in the center.

A process of cabinet formation took place in the Netherlands following the general election of September 2012. After 54 days this led to the Second Rutte cabinet, consisting of People's Party for Freedom and Democracy (VVD) and Labour Party (PvdA). This made it one of the fastest cabinet formations. The formation was the first in which the monarch of the Netherlands did not play an active role.

During the exploration by Henk Kamp it became clear that the two largest parties VVD (41 seats) and PvdA (38 seats) had to negotiate with each other. These negotiations took place under the leadership of informateurs Kamp and Wouter Bos. When this succeeded, a search was made for ministers under formateur Mark Rutte. On 5 November, the Second Rutte cabinet was sworn in.

== Background ==
=== Role of the monarch ===
After the 2010 cabinet formation, there was increased dissatisfaction in the House of Representatives about the role of the monarch in the formation. Therefore, the Rules of Order of the House of Representatives were amended to limit the role of the monarch. Informateurs and formateurs were no longer appointed by the monarch, but by the House of Representatives. However, the monarch was informed about the current political situation and the progress of the formation by her permanent advisors, the speakers of the Senate and House of Representatives and the vice-president of the Council of State.

=== Cause of elections ===
In 2012, the Netherlands found itself in the aftermath of the credit crisis and had to make significant cuts to limit the national debt. The First Rutte cabinet - consisting of the People's Party for Freedom and Democracy (VVD) and the Christian Democratic Appeal (CDA), provided with confidence and supply by the Party for Freedom (PVV) - failed to reach an agreement on the 2013 budget. A cabinet crisis over the budget followed, with the PVV withdrawing the tolerance support and the cabinet offered to resign. New elections were therefore called. For the 2013 budget, the Spring Agreement (Dutch: Lenteakkoord) was concluded with Democrats 66 (D66), GroenLinks (GL) and Christian Union (CU).

=== Election results ===
Composition of the House of Representatives after the 2012 elections throughout the cabinet formation: SP: 15 PvdD: 2 PvdA: 38 GL: 4 D66: 12 50+: 2 VVD: 41 CU: 5 CDA: 13 SGP: 3 PVV: 15

The campaign for the elections started as a contest between Mark Rutte (VVD) and Emile Roemer (SP). However, Roemer's debate performance was disappointing, while the recently appointed party leader Diederik Samsom (PvdA) stood out positively. Samsom rose in the polls and took Roemer's place in the battle. Ultimately, the VVD became the largest with 41 seats and PvdA second with 38 seats.

34% of voters had voted strategically, so that the chosen party has a lot of influence on cabinet policy or to prevent another party from gaining too much power. For example, many VVD voters actually had the PVV as their first choice, and many PvdA voters actually had SP as their first choice, but based on the polls they still voted for the larger party in the polls.

== Scout Kamp ==
Rutte and Samsom already had contact with each other on election night, in which they determined that cooperation between their parties was inevitable. Samsom's suggestion to add an extra party, such as the SP, was rejected by Rutte. On 13 September, the intended parliamentary group leaders met with speaker of the House of Representatives Gerdi Verbeet. On the recommendation of Rutte – and in consultation with Samsom – VVD minister Henk Kamp was appointed as scout. That evening Rutte and Samsom spoke again in the Hague apartment of VVD parliamentary leader in the Senate Loek Hermans. Samsom indicated that he wanted to remain party chairman and put forward Amsterdam alderman Lodewijk Asscher as Deputy Prime Minister. They also expressed their willingness to take painful measures given the economic situation.

A day later, Kamp invited all intended party chairmen individually for an interview. A majority of the parties – VVD, PvdA, PVV, CDA, D66, Christian Union, GroenLinks, SGP and 50Plus – recommended exploring a coalition of at least VVD and PvdA. That same evening, Rutte and Samsom spoke in the Torentje, together with MPs Stef Blok (VVD) and Jeroen Dijsselbloem (PvdA), who would later be their secondants. They decided not to involve other parties in the formation, because they believed this would be a pointless exercise.

On 17 September, Kamp held separate conversations with Samsom and Rutte, and then a joint conversation. The conclusion was that there was confidence for a fruitful collaboration. They also confirmed their choice of Kamp and former PvdA party leader Wouter Bos as informateurs, something they had already agreed on the morning after the elections. On 18 September, Kamp published his final report, with the advice to let VVD and PvdA negotiate under the leadership of himself and Bos.

== Informateurs Kamp and Bos ==
Press conference informateurs Kamp and Bos on 21 September 2012.

On 20 September, the new House of Representatives debated Kamp's report and agreed to his proposal to appoint himself and Bos as informateurs. Where the discussions used to take place in the minister's chamber of the Senate, from then on the negotiations were conducted in the Stadhouder's Chamber (Dutch: Stadhouderskamer) in the House of Representatives building. This made it explicit that the formation of the House of Representatives was in charge.

The negotiators agreed not to reach "watery" compromises. This had typified the Fourth Balkenende cabinet (2006–2010), in which PvdA had been a member. Instead, topics were exchanged. Based on his experience in business, Bos had introduced a system for this. The main elements of the coalition agreement were already established in the week of 24 September. The portfolio allocation and staffing had largely already been completed.

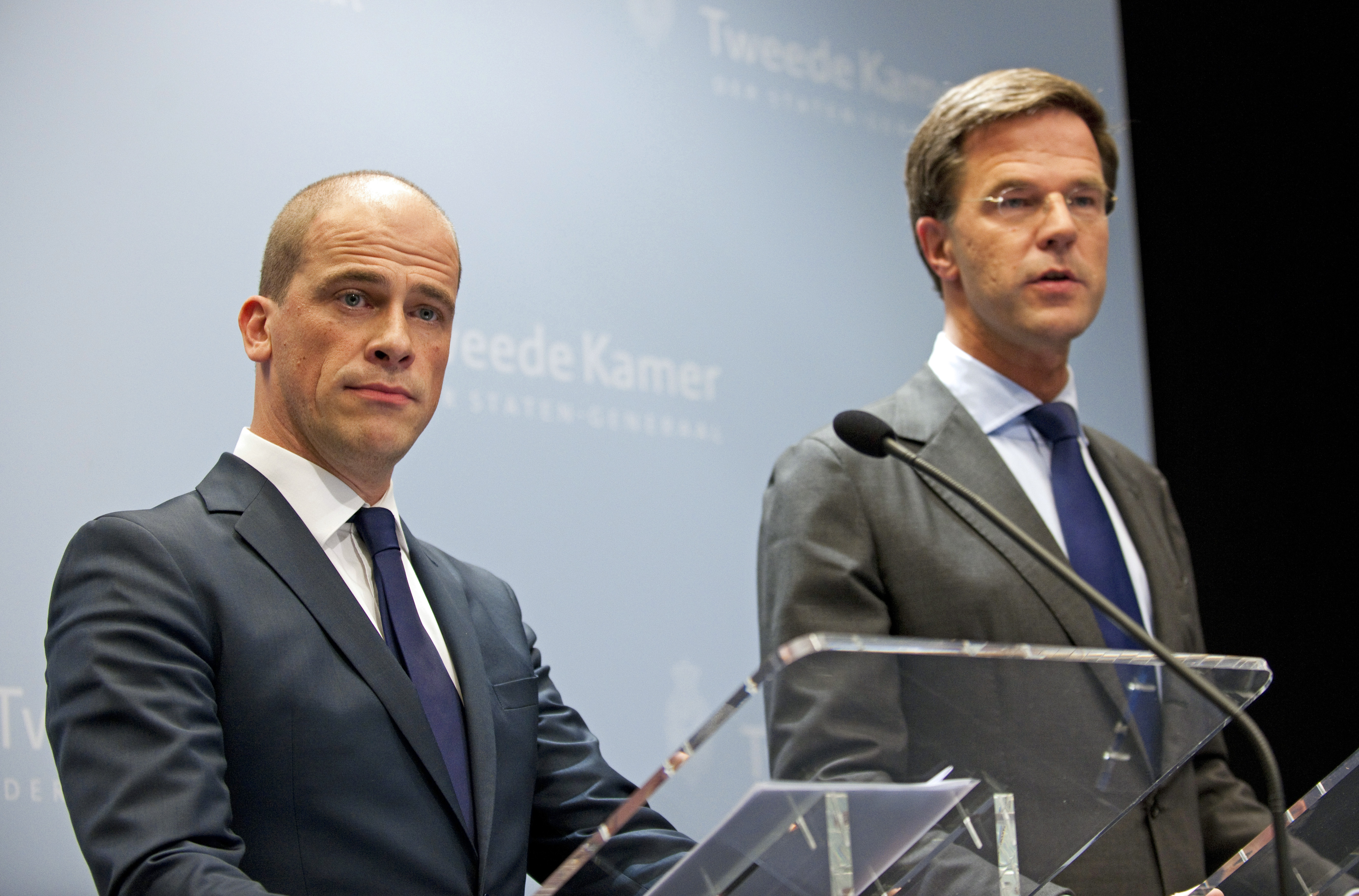
Diederik Samsom and Mark Rutte explain the measures in the partial agreement.

The negotiations took place after Prinsjesdag, where the budget of 2013 was presented, based on the Spring Agreement. To bring the budget into line with the coalition agreement, VVD and PvdA presented a partial agreement on 1 October. The Spring Agreement was adjusted on a number of points, such as reversal of the long-study fine, increase in insurance tax, increase in VAT and faster increase in the retirement age. During a debate on 9 October, the partial agreement was adopted by motion, with support only from VVD and PvdA.

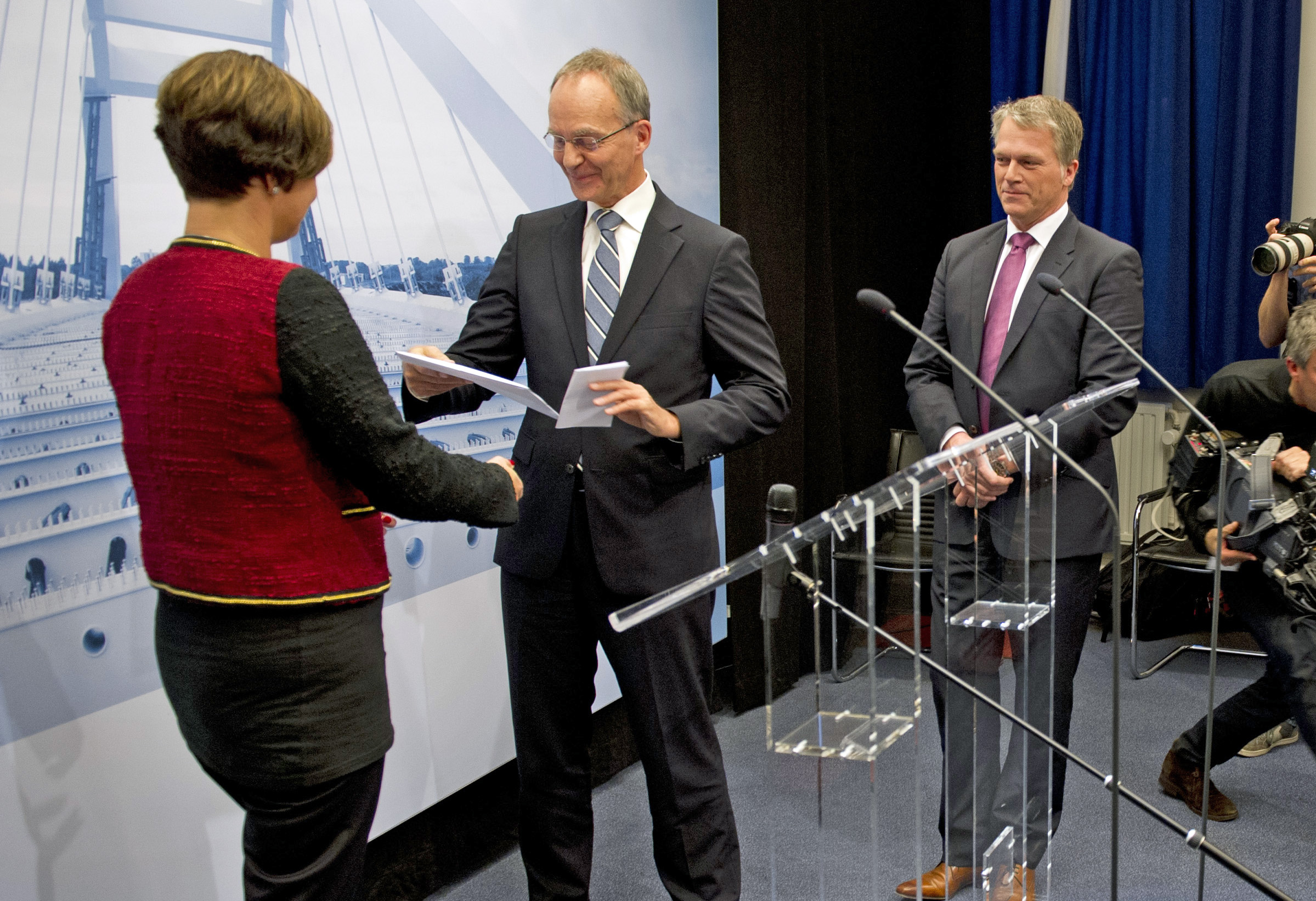
InformateursHenk Kamp and Wouter Bos present their final report to speaker of the House Anouchka van Miltenburg.

Discussions on the coalition agreement were completed on 26 October. That weekend it was calculated by the Bureau for Economic Policy Analysis (CPB). On 29 October, the coalition agreement was presented to the VVD and PvdA factions. The factions agreed, after which the coalition agreement was presented with the motto "Building Bridges". What was striking was the ban on circus animals what Rutte had introduced during the negotiations, without it having been included in the election manifesto. Members of Parliament from the VVD later thought that this was a PvdA idea and tried to scrap it. It was speculated that this was a gift from Rutte to one of his loved ones.

== Formateur Rutte ==
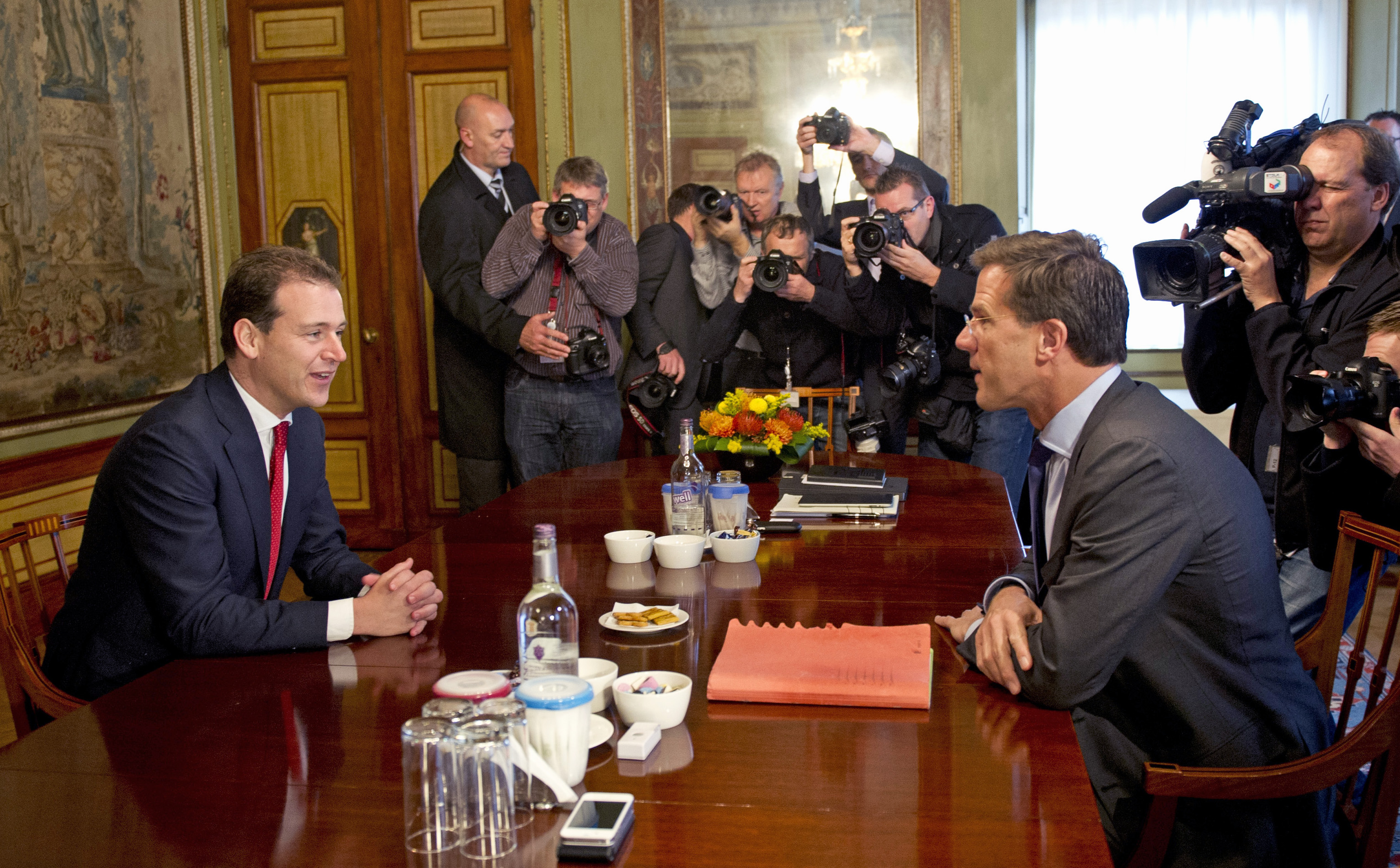
Formateur Rutte in conversation with Lodewijk Asscher, candidate Minister of Social Affairs and Employment and Deputy Prime Minister.

On 31 October, the House of Representatives agreed to the advice of the informateurs to appoint Rutte as formateur. The VVD got seven ministers and the PvdA six. Conversely, the PvdA received four state secretaries and the VVD three. The Ministership for Immigration and Asylum was deleted. Instead, two new ministerial positions were created without portfolio: the Minister for Foreign Trade and Development Cooperation and the Minister for Housing and National Services. The name of the Ministry of Economic Affairs, Agriculture and Innovation was changed to the Ministry of Economic Affairs.

On 1 and 2 November, formateur Rutte held talks with the candidate ministers. Two people are known to have been approached but declined. Former PvdA minister Guusje ter Horst had declined to become Minister of the Interior and Kingdom Relations, because this department had been stripped down too much in 2010. Asscher had asked former GroenLinks party leader Femke Halsema for the position of Minister of Development Cooperation and Foreign Trade. However, both Halsema and the VVD saw no point in that.

Despite major objections to the criminalization of illegality in the coalition agreement, the PvdA congress agreed to government participation on 3 November. That same day, the constitutive deliberation was held, where no major objections were raised. On 5 November, the new ministers of the Second Rutte cabinet were sworn in. For the first time, the swearing-in ceremony was broadcast on television, although it had to be redone due to an error by the broadcaster.

== Aftermath ==
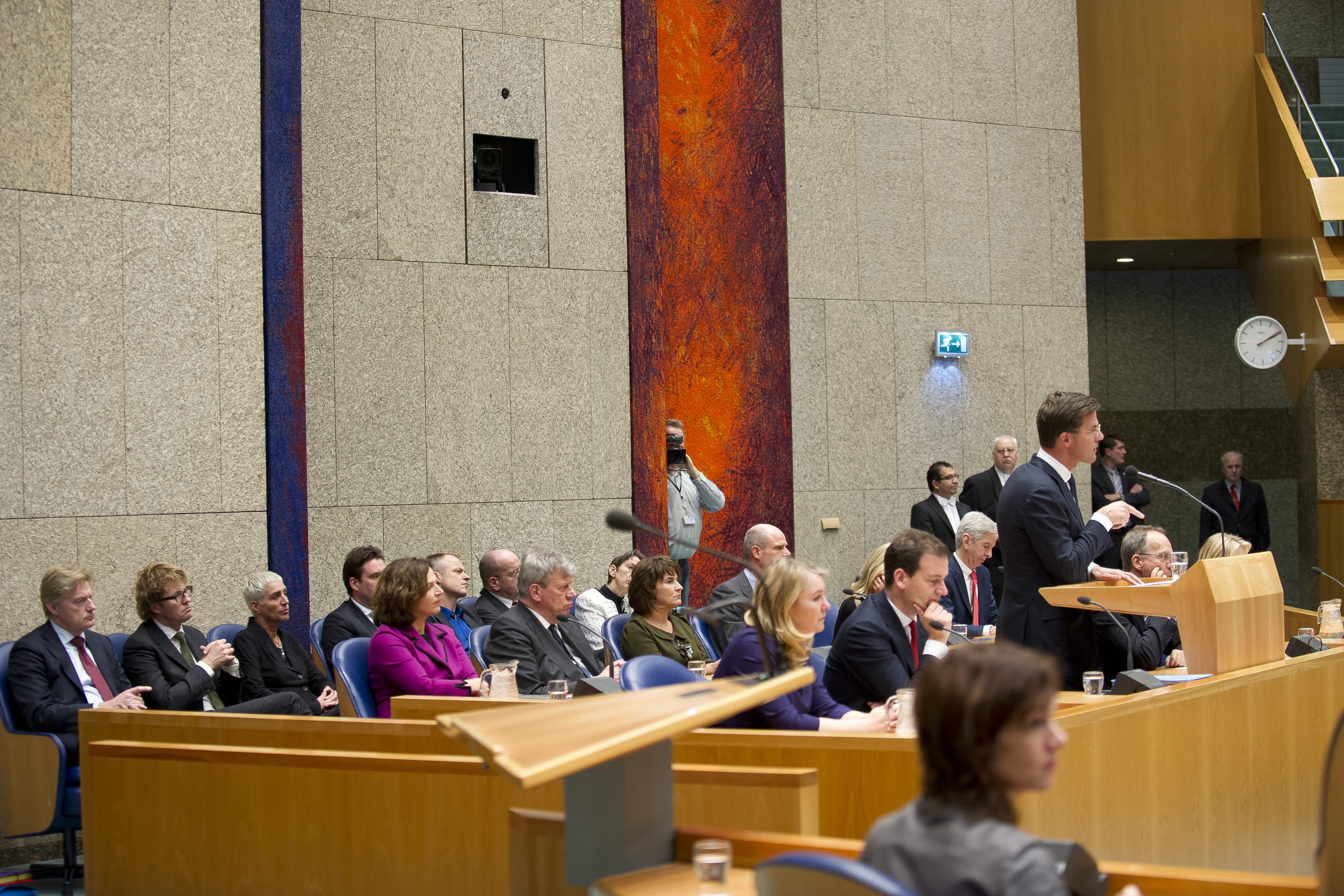
The cabinet meets during the debate on the government statement.

Immediately after the announcement of the coalition agreement, there was a fuss about the income-related healthcare premium, led by De Telegraaf and former VVD party leader Hans Wiegel. In a poll by Maurice de Hond, the VVD dropped from 38 to 27 seats in one week. During her conversation with the formateur, VVD Minister of Health, Welfare and Sport Edith Schippers objected to the change. Due to the reactions, it was decided on 9 November to cancel the plan. Instead, redistribution of income and wealth was done through the income tax. In addition, 250 million euros were taken away from infrastructure, which the PvdA was allowed to spend on "social measures". The debate on the government statement on 12 and 13 November, which was postponed due to Rutte's foreign commitments and the lack of National Institute for Budget Information calculations, was still dominated by the issue of the income-related healthcare premium.

Just over a month after being sworn in, PvdA State Secretary Co Verdaas resigned, because he allegedly tampered with travel expense claims during his time as a deputy in Gelderland. After Verdaas resigned, Rutte said that as a formateur he did not know this was happening. However, the province of Gelderland later indicated that all this information about Verdaas had been sent to the formateur.

Despite the major substantive differences between the PvdA and VVD, the cabinet managed to survive several cabinet crises. It became the first cabinet since 1998 to complete the entire parliamentary period and the longest-serving Dutch cabinet since the World War II. In the 2017 general election, the PvdA dropped from 38 seats to 9 and the VVD dropped from 41 to 33. The PvdA was accused of having negotiated too quickly in the formation, with too many painful measures for the PvdA.
