= First Rutte cabinet =

Cabinet of the Netherlands, 2010 to 2012

First Rutte cabinet Rutte–Verhagen cabinet
- Cabinet of the Netherlands

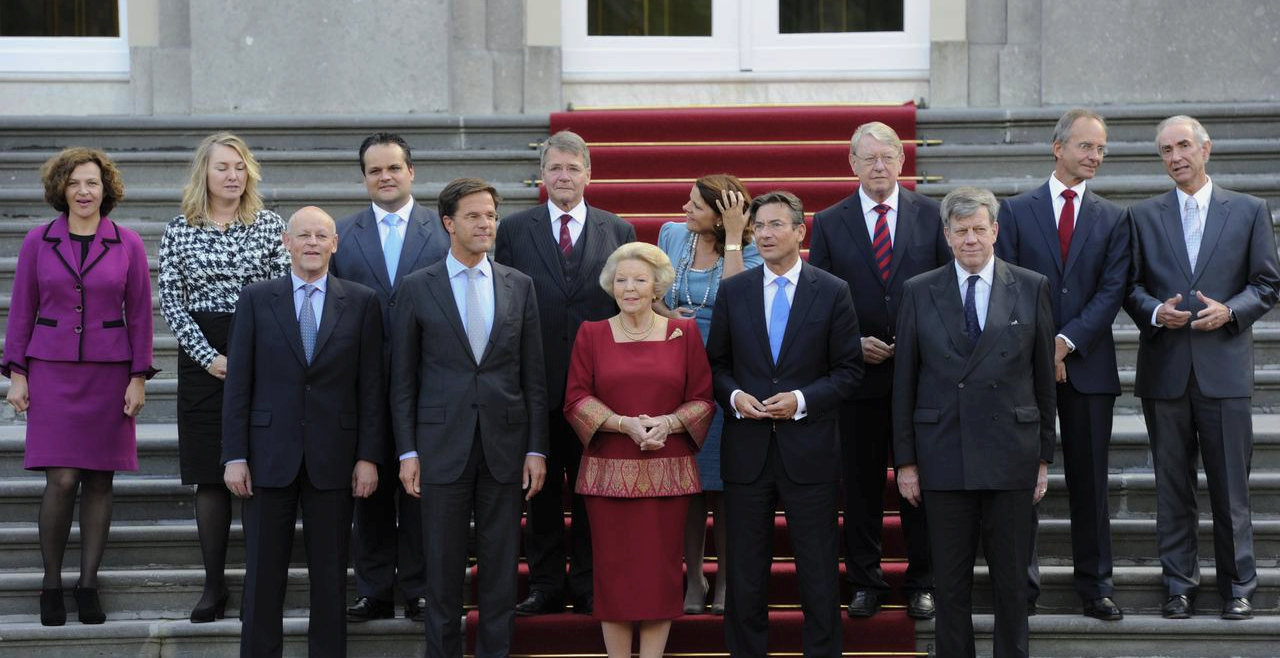
- Installation of the cabinet by Queen Beatrix at Huis ten Bosch on 14 October 2010
- Date formed: 14 October 2010
- Date dissolved: 5 November 2012; 2 years, 22 days in office (Demissionary from 23 April 2012)

People and organisations
- Monarch: Queen Beatrix
- Prime Minister: Mark Rutte
- Deputy Prime Minister: Maxime Verhagen
- No. of ministers: 12
- Ministers removed: 1
- Total no. of members: 13
- Member party: People's Party for Freedom and Democracy (VVD); Christian Democratic Appeal (CDA) Party for Freedom (PVV) (Confidence and supply)
- Status in legislature: Right-wing minority government

History
- Election: 2010 election
- Outgoing election: 2012 election
- Legislature terms: 2010–2012
- Incoming formation: 2010 formation
- Outgoing formation: 2012 formation
- Predecessor: Fourth Balkenende cabinet
- Successor: Second Rutte cabinet

The first Rutte cabinet, also called the Rutte–Verhagen cabinet was the executive branch of the government of the Netherlands from 14 October 2010 until 5 November 2012. The cabinet was formed by the conservative-liberal People's Party for Freedom and Democracy (VVD) and the Christian-democratic Christian Democratic Appeal (CDA) after the election of 2010. The cabinet was a right-wing coalition and had a minority in the House of Representatives but had confidence and supply from the Party for Freedom (PVV) for a slim majority with Liberal Leader Mark Rutte serving as Prime Minister. Christian Democratic Leader Maxime Verhagen served as Deputy Prime Minister and Minister of Economic Affairs, Agriculture and Innovation.

The cabinet served in the early years of the 2010s. Domestically, it had to deal with the fallout of the 2008 financial crisis but it was able to implement several major social reforms to law enforcement, victims' rights and immigration. Internationally, it had to deal with the European debt crisis, the war on terror and the government support for the Task Force Uruzgan. The cabinet suffered several major internal and external conflicts because of the confidence and supply construction from the Party for Freedom. The cabinet fell just 18 months into its term on 23 April 2012 after the Party for Freedom withdrew its support following a disagreeing with the coalition over stronger austerity measures to reduce the deficit following the 2008 financial crisis. The cabinet continued in a demissionary capacity until it was replaced by the second Rutte cabinet following the election of 2012.

== Formation ==
Composition of the cabinet in relation to the rest of the legislature

Following the collapse of the fourth Balkenende cabinet on 20 February 2010, elections for the House of Representatives were held on 9 June 2010. As usual in Dutch politics, none of the parties had a majority and several informateurs were appointed to investigate the formation of a coalition cabinet. A broad coalition consisting of the People's Party for Freedom and Democracy (VVD), Christian Democratic Appeal (CDA) and the Labour Party (PvdA) was briefly looked at, but dismissed. Then negotiations for a "purple plus" coalition consisting of the VVD, PvdA, Democrats 66 and GreenLeft lasted for about three weeks, but the parties could not reach agreement on the amount of budget cuts.

Finally, a construction which is rare for the Netherlands was investigated: a minority coalition consisting of the VVD and Christian Democratic Appeal (together 52 out of 150 seats in the House of Representatives), supported in parliament by the Party for Freedom (PVV, 24 seats), to make the smallest possible majority of 76 seats. The right wing PVV had the largest gains in the recent elections.

The stated reason for this construction was that parties agreed that the largest party (the VVD) and the party with the largest gains (considered the 'winner' in Dutch politics) needed to be in power. Only CDA could or wanted to help make a majority, but they were against forming a proper coalition with PVV because of their different views on Islam and immigration. Therefore, negotiations were held to form a coalition agreement between the VVD and CDA), and to form a "parliamentary support agreement" between all three parties, which were successfully finished on 30 September 2010.

When Rutte took office on 14 October, it marked the first time that the VVD had led a government since its formation in 1946. It also marked the first liberal-led government since 1913.

Opposition parties and commentators expected that the coalition would prove to be unstable because at a special Christian Democratic Appeal conference, about a third of the party members voted against the formation of this cabinet. Also, at least three members of parliament in the CDA parliamentary fraction indicated to have difficulties with the cabinet. Eventually they left the parliament or supported the deal, pointing to the approval by the majority of the party conference.

When the cabinet took office, the three parties had a minority in the Senate of 35 out of 75 seats. The parties hoped this would change following the Dutch Senate election of 2011, but they obtained 37 seats, one short of a majority. A small protestant party, the Reformed Political Party, which obtained one seat, supported the cabinet in the Senate however.

The cabinet consisted of 12 Ministers and 8 State secretaries. The positions where divided equally among the coalition members, regardless of their respective size: People's Party for Freedom and Democracy (31 seats in parliament) supplied 6 Ministers and 4 State secretaries, and Christian Democratic Appeal (21 seats) also supplied 6 Ministers and 4 State secretaries.

== Term ==
=== Policy ===
In accordance with the People's Party for Freedom and Democracy (VVD) approach to laissez-faire and a small government, the number of ministers and State Secretaries was reduced from the previous cabinet by merging several ministries. The Ministry of Agriculture, Nature and Food Quality was merged with the Ministry of Economic Affairs to form a combined Ministry Economic Affairs, Agriculture and Innovation. The Ministry of Housing, Spatial Planning and the Environment was merged with the Ministry of Transport and Water Management to form the new Ministry of Infrastructure and the Environment.

The portfolio of public security was transferred from the Ministry of the Interior and Kingdom Relations to the Ministry of Justice which was renamed as the Ministry of Security and Justice, in line with the tough security profile of the coalition parties, especially the VVD which delivered both the minister and state secretary for this department. Also the position of the Minister for Development Cooperation, a long serving Minister without portfolio title that had been used continuously since 1965 (except for a small break from 2002 to 2003), was scrapped and replaced by the return of a Minister without portfolio for Immigration and Asylum Affairs like in the previous Cabinets Balkenende I, II and III, but this time this post was placed at the department and budget of the Ministry of the Interior and Kingdom Relations instead of the Ministry of Security and Justice.

=== Withdrawal of support of the Party for Freedom ===
Because of the financial crisis in the Netherlands and because of the rules of the Euro convergence criteria that the deficit should be maximum 3%, the Leaders of the People's Party for Freedom and Democracy Mark Rutte, Christian Democratic Appeal Maxime Verhagen and the Party for Freedom Geert Wilders decided to talk with each other about new, severe austerity measures, worth about 14 billion Euro. The negotiations about the measures were held in the Catshuis and lasted 7 weeks and ended on 21 April when Geert Wilders walked out of the negotiations. The reason he gave was that the measure would negatively impact people who receive benefits from the pensions law. Both Mark Rutte and Maxime Verhagen blamed Wilders for the failure of the negotiations. As a result, the government resigned and a new election was called.

=== Composition changes ===
On 16 December 2011, Minister of the Interior and Kingdom Relations Piet Hein Donner (CDA) resigned after he was nominated as the new Vice-President of the Council of State succeeding Herman Tjeenk Willink. He was replaced as Minister of the Interior and Kingdom Relations by former Chairwoman of the Christian Democratic Appeal Liesbeth Spies. Piet Hein Donner as Minister of the Interior and Kingdom Relations was responsible for the portfolio of Integration. When he resigned the Integration portfolio was transferred to Minister without portfolio Gerd Leers.

== Cabinet members ==
Ministers
Ministers		Title/Ministry		Term of office		Party
Ministers		Title/Ministry		Begin	End	Party
Mark Rutte	Mark Rutte (born 1967)	Prime Minister	General Affairs	14 October 2010	5 November 2012^{[Continued]}	VVD
Maxime Verhagen	Maxime Verhagen (born 1956)	Deputy; Prime Minister	Economic Affairs, Agriculture and Innovation	14 October 2010	5 November 2012	CDA
Maxime Verhagen	Maxime Verhagen (born 1956)	Minister	Economic Affairs, Agriculture and Innovation	14 October 2010	5 November 2012	CDA
Piet Hein Donner	Piet Hein Donner (born 1948)	Minister	Interior and Kingdom Relations	14 October 2010	16 December 2011^{[App]}	CDA
Liesbeth Spies	Liesbeth Spies (born 1966)	Minister	Interior and Kingdom Relations	16 December 2011	5 November 2012	CDA
Uri Rosenthal	Dr. Uri Rosenthal (born 1945)	Minister	Foreign Affairs	14 October 2010	5 November 2012	VVD
Jan Kees de Jager	Jan Kees de Jager (born 1969)	Minister	Finance	23 February 2010	5 November 2012^{[Retained]}	CDA
Ivo Opstelten	Ivo Opstelten (born 1944)	Minister	Security and Justice	14 October 2010	5 November 2012^{[Continued]}	VVD
Hans Hillen	Hans Hillen (born 1947)	Minister	Defence	14 October 2010	5 November 2012	CDA
Edith Schippers	Edith Schippers (born 1964)	Minister	Health, Welfare and Sport	14 October 2010	5 November 2012^{[Continued]}	VVD
Henk Kamp	Henk Kamp (born 1952)	Minister	Social Affairs and Employment	14 October 2010	5 November 2012	VVD
Marja van Bijsterveldt	Marja van Bijsterveldt (born 1961)	Minister	Education, Culture and Science	14 October 2010	5 November 2012	CDA
Melanie Schultz van Haegen	Melanie Schultz van Haegen (born 1970)	Minister	Infrastructure and the Environment	14 October 2010	5 November 2012^{[Continued]}	VVD

Minister without portfolio
Minister		Title/Ministry/Portfolio(s)			Term of office		Party
Minister		Title/Ministry/Portfolio(s)			Begin	End	Party
Gerd Leers	Gerd Leers (born 1951)	Minister	Interior and Kingdom Relations	• Immigration and Asylum	14 October 2010	16 December 2011	CDA
Gerd Leers	Gerd Leers (born 1951)	Minister	Interior and Kingdom Relations	• Immigration and Asylum • Integration • Minorities	16 December 2011	5 November 2012	CDA

State Secretaries
State Secretary		Title/Ministry/Portfolio(s)			Term of office		Party
State Secretary		Title/Ministry/Portfolio(s)			Begin	End	Party
Ben Knapen	Dr. Ben Knapen (born 1951)	State Secretary^{[Title]}	Foreign Affairs	• European Union • Benelux • Development; Cooperation	14 October 2010	5 November 2012	CDA
Frans Weekers	Frans Weekers (born 1967)	State Secretary	Finance	• Fiscal Policy • Tax and Customs • Governmental; Budget	14 October 2010	5 November 2012^{[Continued]}	VVD
Fred Teeven	Fred Teeven (born 1958)	State Secretary^{[Title]}	Security and Justice	• Public; Prosecution • Civil Law • Property Law • Victims' Rights • Judicial Reform • Youth Justice • Penitentiaries • Debt • Gambling^{[Title]}	14 October 2010	5 November 2012^{[Continued]}	VVD
Henk Bleker	Dr. Henk Bleker (born 1953)	State Secretary^{[Title]}	Economic Affairs, Agriculture and Innovation	• Trade and Export • Agriculture • Food Policy • Fisheries • Forestry • Postal Service • Tourism • Animal Welfare	14 October 2010	5 November 2012	CDA
Marlies Veldhuijzen van Zanten	Marlies; Veldhuijzen van Zanten (born 1953)	State Secretary	Health, Welfare and Sport	• Elderly Care • Youth Care • Disability Policy • Medical Ethics • Pharmaceutical; Policy	14 October 2010	5 November 2012	CDA
Paul de Krom	Paul de Krom (born 1963)	State Secretary	Social Affairs and Employment	• Social Security • Unemployment • Occupational; Safety • Social Services	14 October 2010	5 November 2012	VVD
Halbe Zijlstra	Halbe Zijlstra (born 1969)	State Secretary	Education, Culture and Science	• Higher; Education • Adult; Education • Science Policy • Culture • Art	14 October 2010	5 November 2012	VVD
Joop Atsma	Joop Atsma (born 1956)	State Secretary	Infrastructure and the Environment	• Aviation • Water; Management • Environmental; Policy • Weather; Forecasting	14 October 2010	5 November 2012	CDA

^{Continued in the next cabinet}
^{Retained from the previous cabinet}
^{Designated with the diplomatic rank of Minister}
^{Appointed as Vice-President of the Council of State}

== Gallery ==
Photos of the first Rutte cabinet
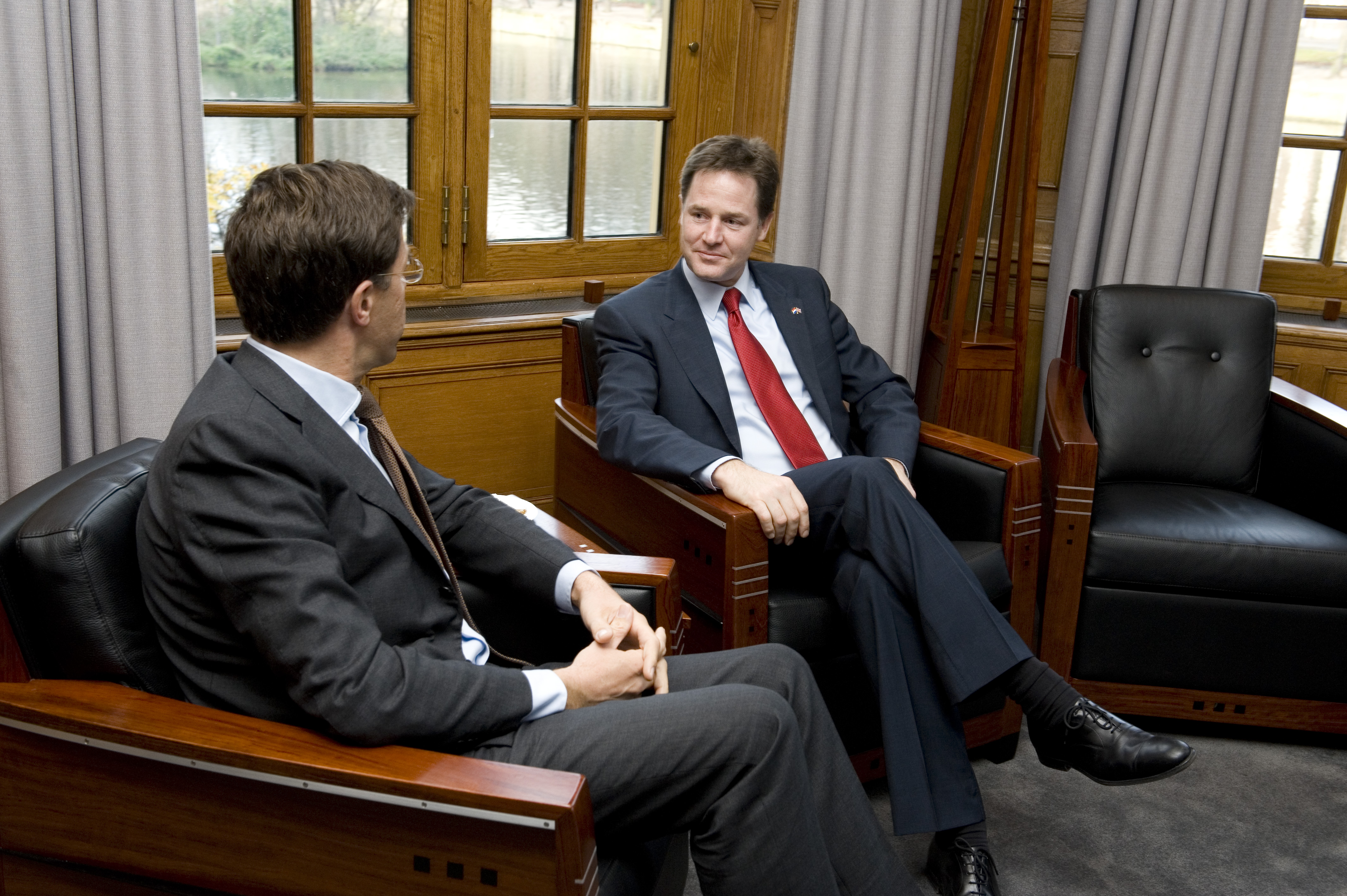
Prime Minister Mark Rutte and Deputy Prime Minister of the United Kingdom Nick Clegg in the Torentje on 15 November 2010.

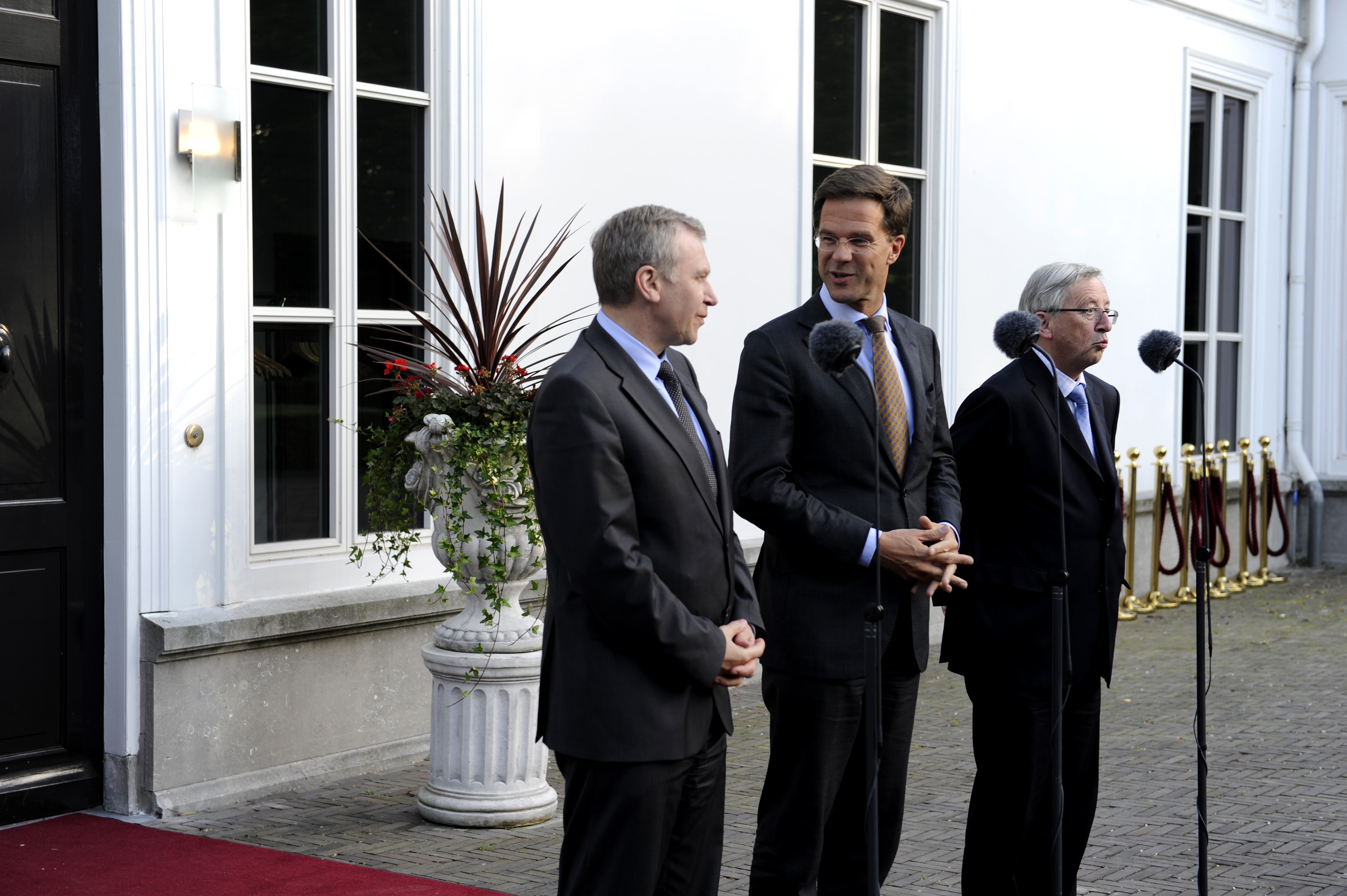
Prime Minister of Belgium Yves Leterme, Prime Minister Mark Rutte and Prime Minister of Luxembourg Jean-Claude Juncker at the Catshuis on 24 May 2011.

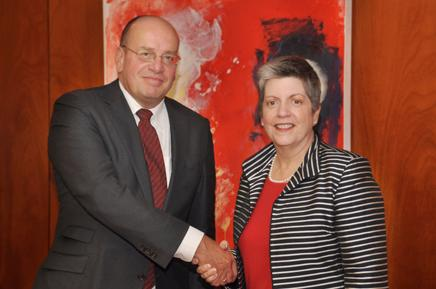
State Secretary for Security and Justice Fred Teeven and United States Secretary of Homeland Security Janet Napolitano in The Hague on 22 June 2011.

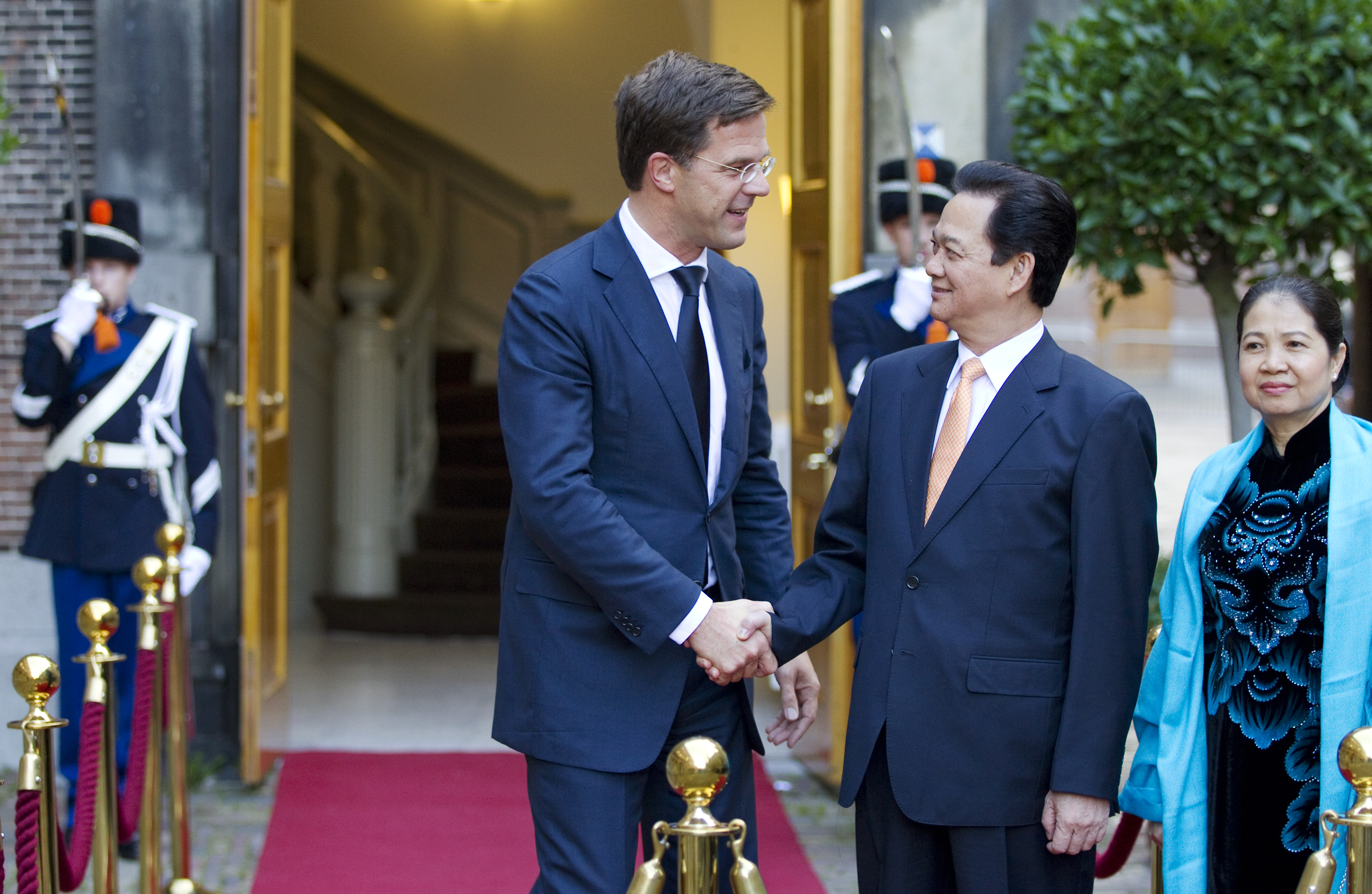
Prime Minister Mark Rutte and Prime Minister of Vietnam Nguyễn Tấn Dũng at the Binnenhof on 28 September 2011.

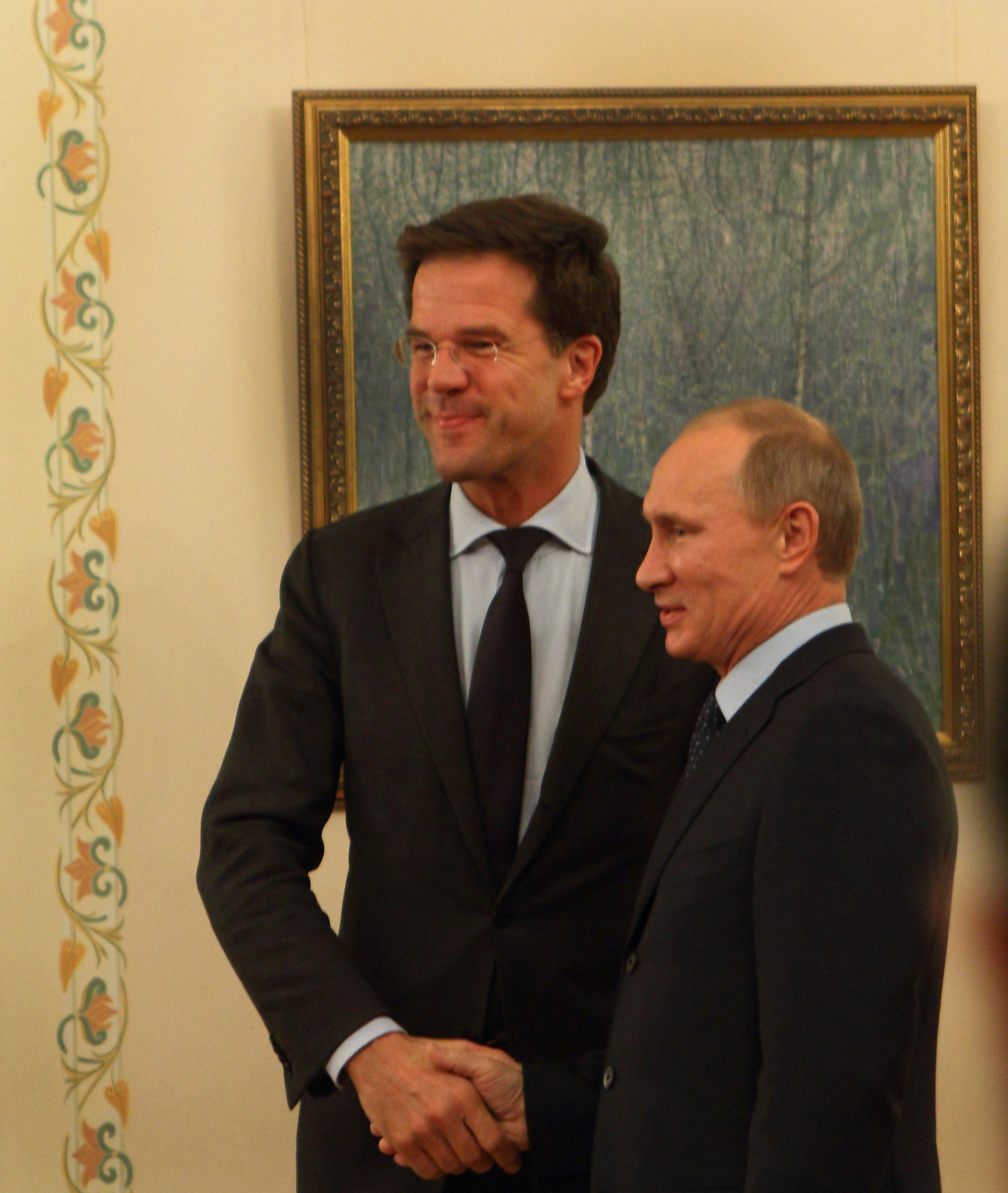
Prime Minister Mark Rutte and Prime Minister of Russia Vladimir Putin in the White House on 20 October 2011.

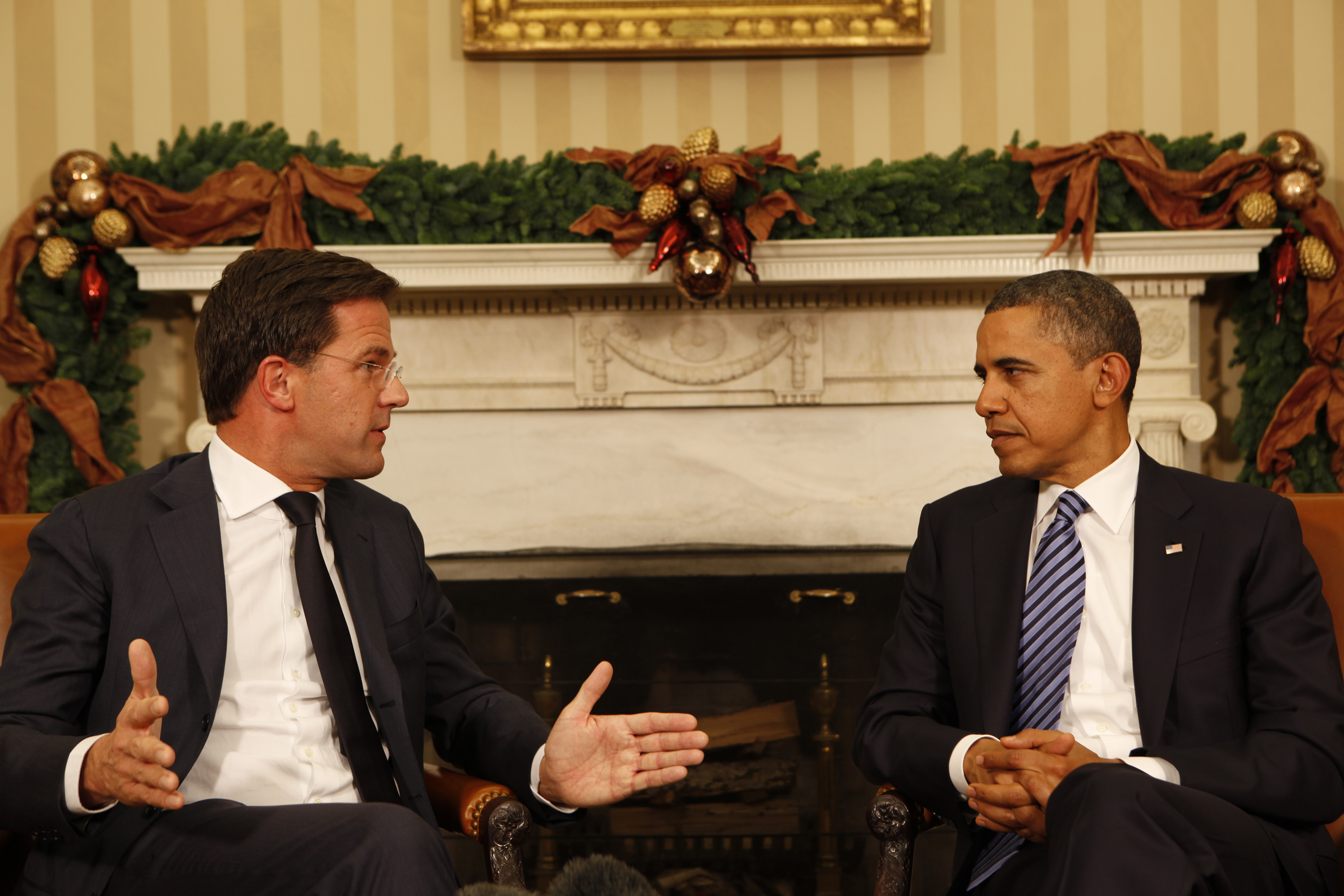
Prime Minister Mark Rutte and President of the United States Barack Obama in the Oval Office on 29 November 2011.

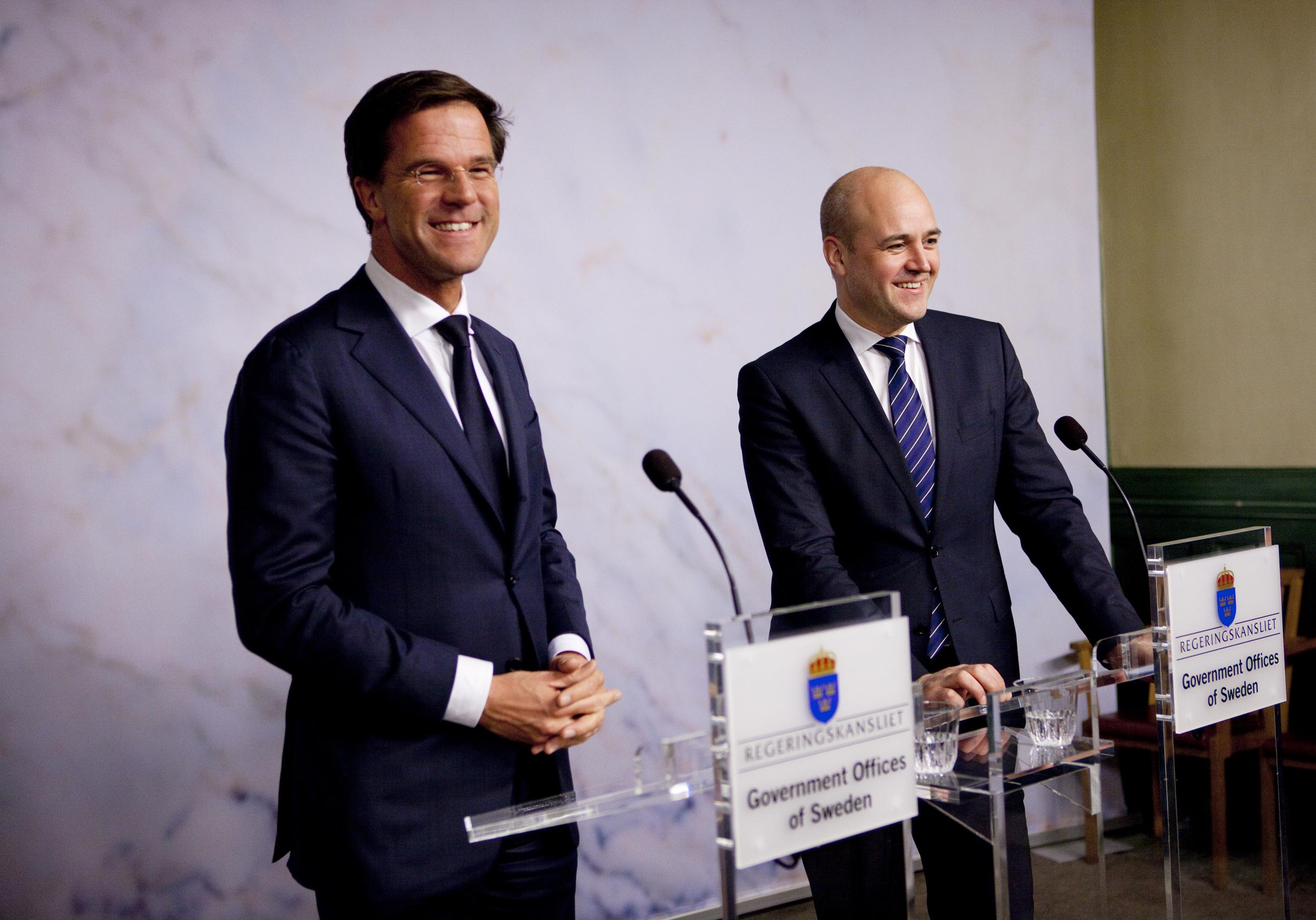
Prime Minister Mark Rutte and Prime Minister of Sweden Fredrik Reinfeldt at a press conference in Stockholm on 5 December 2011.

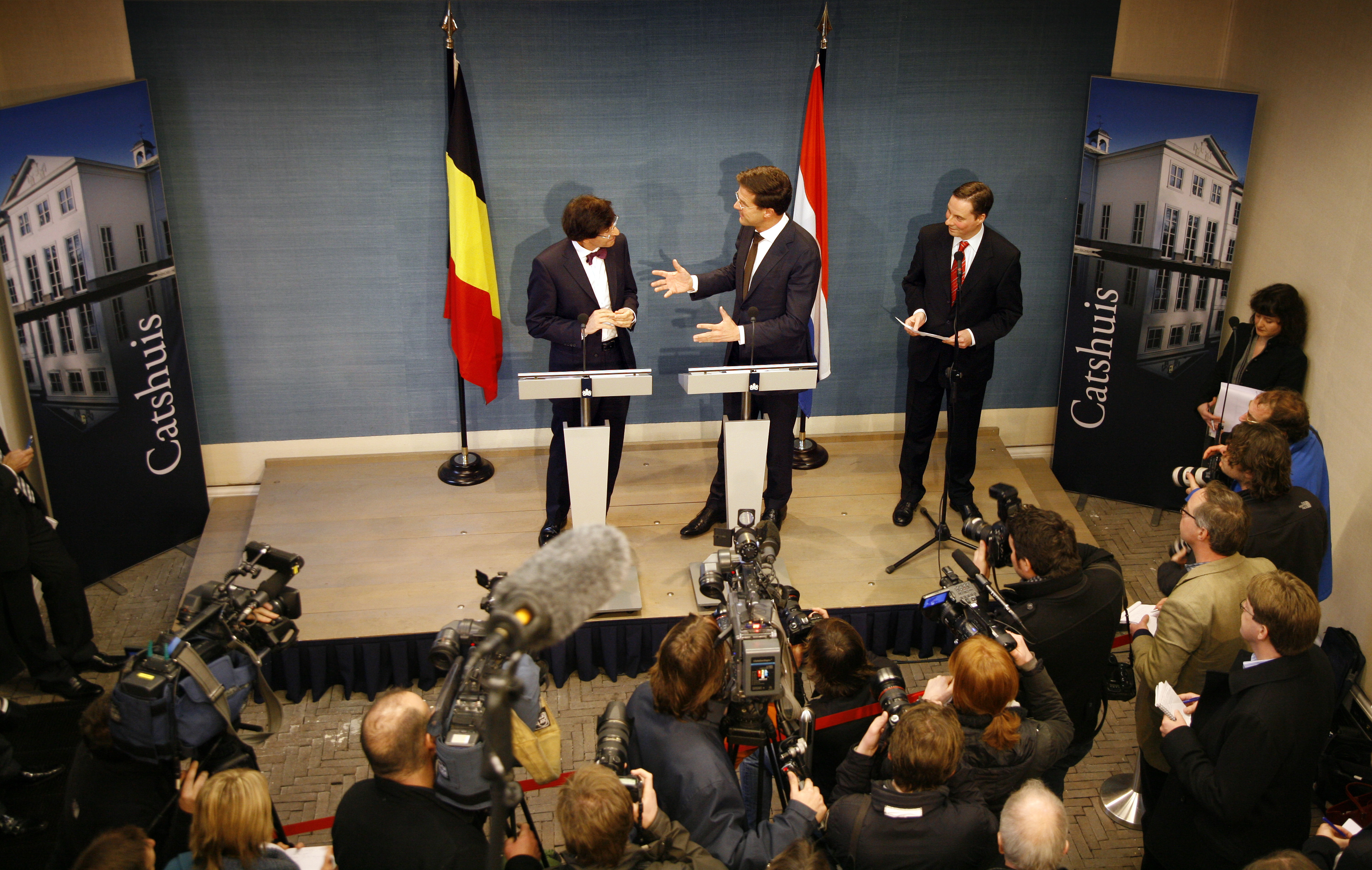
Prime Minister of Belgium Elio Di Rupo and Prime Minister Mark Rutte at a press conference at the Catshuis on 18 January 2012.

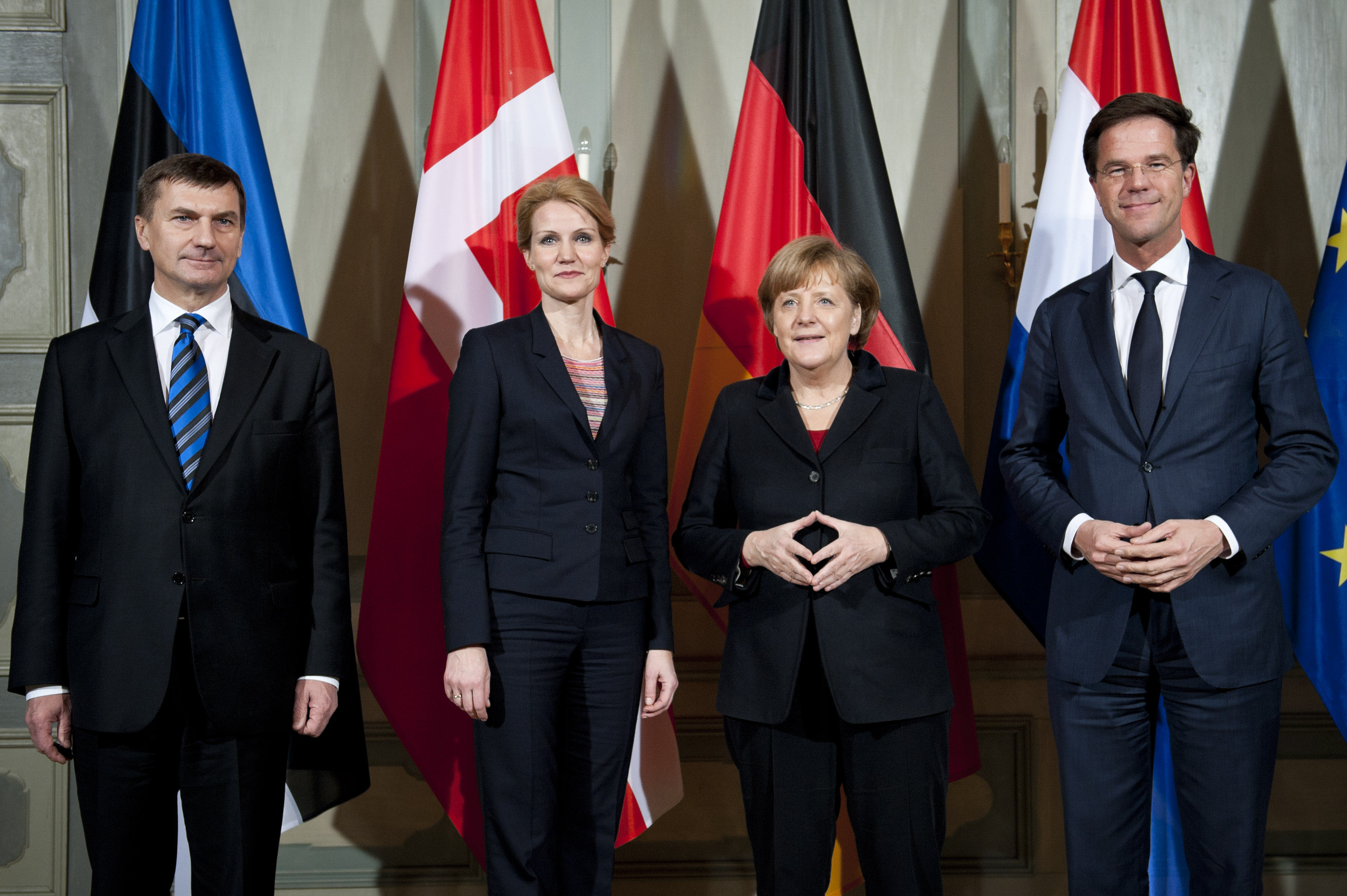
Prime Minister of Estonia Andrus Ansip, Prime Minister of Denmark Helle Thorning-Schmidt, Chancellor of Germany Angela Merkel and Prime Minister Mark Rutte at the Catshuis on 13 February 2012.

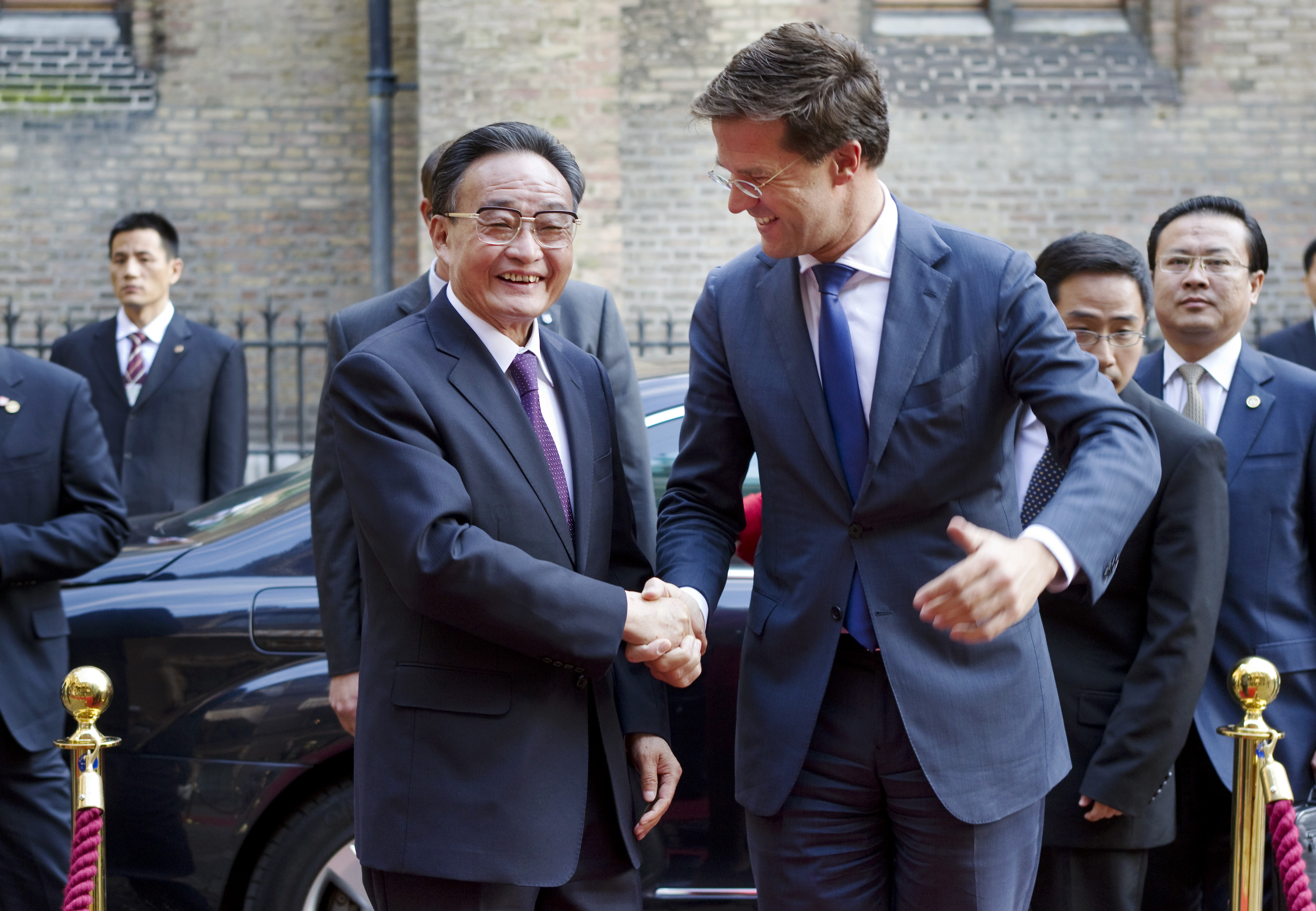
Chinese top politician Wu Bangguo and Prime Minister Mark Rutte at the Binnenhof on 15 May 2012.

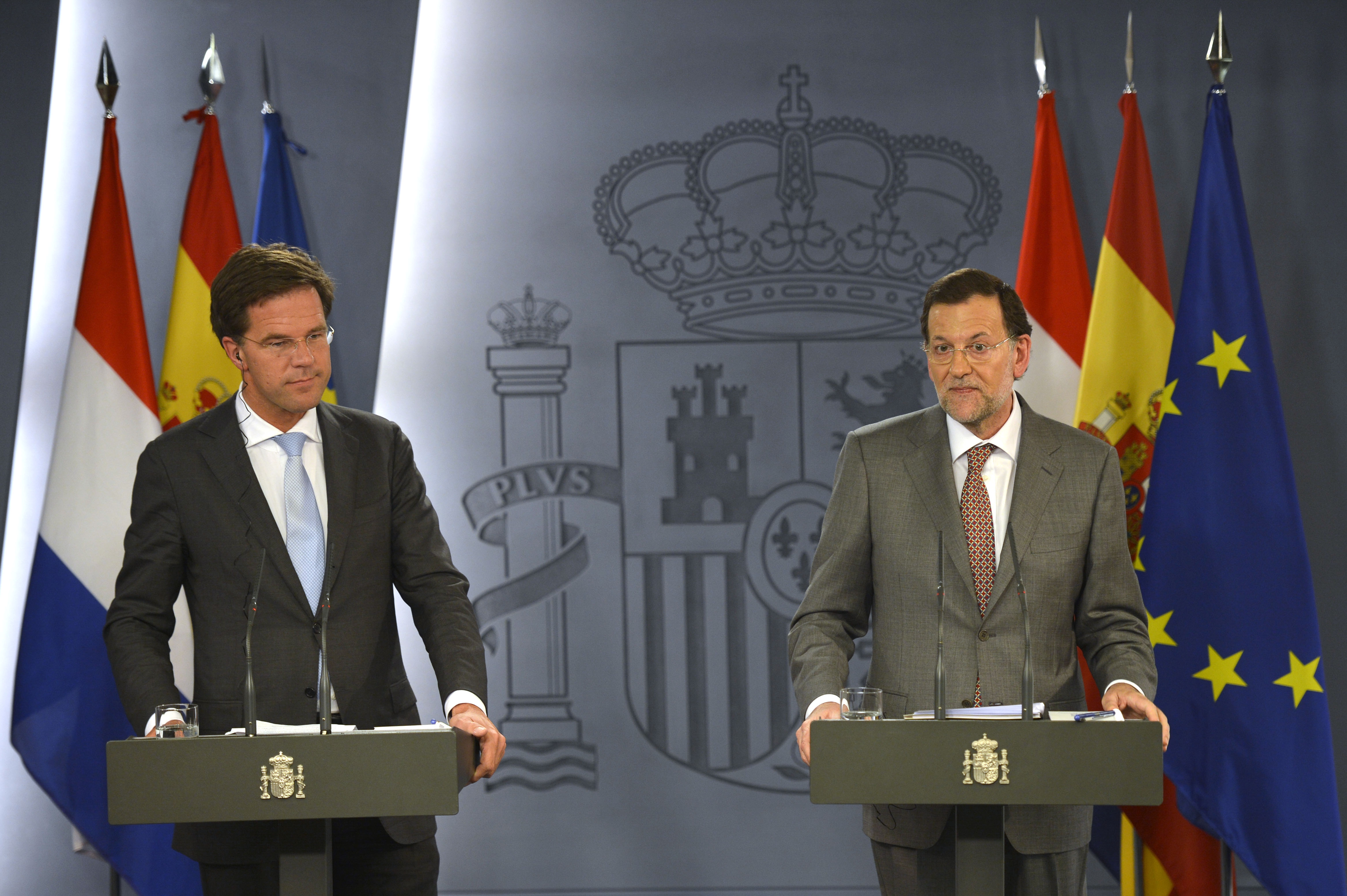
Prime Minister Mark Rutte and Prime Minister of Spain Mariano Rajoy in Madrid on 7 June 2012.

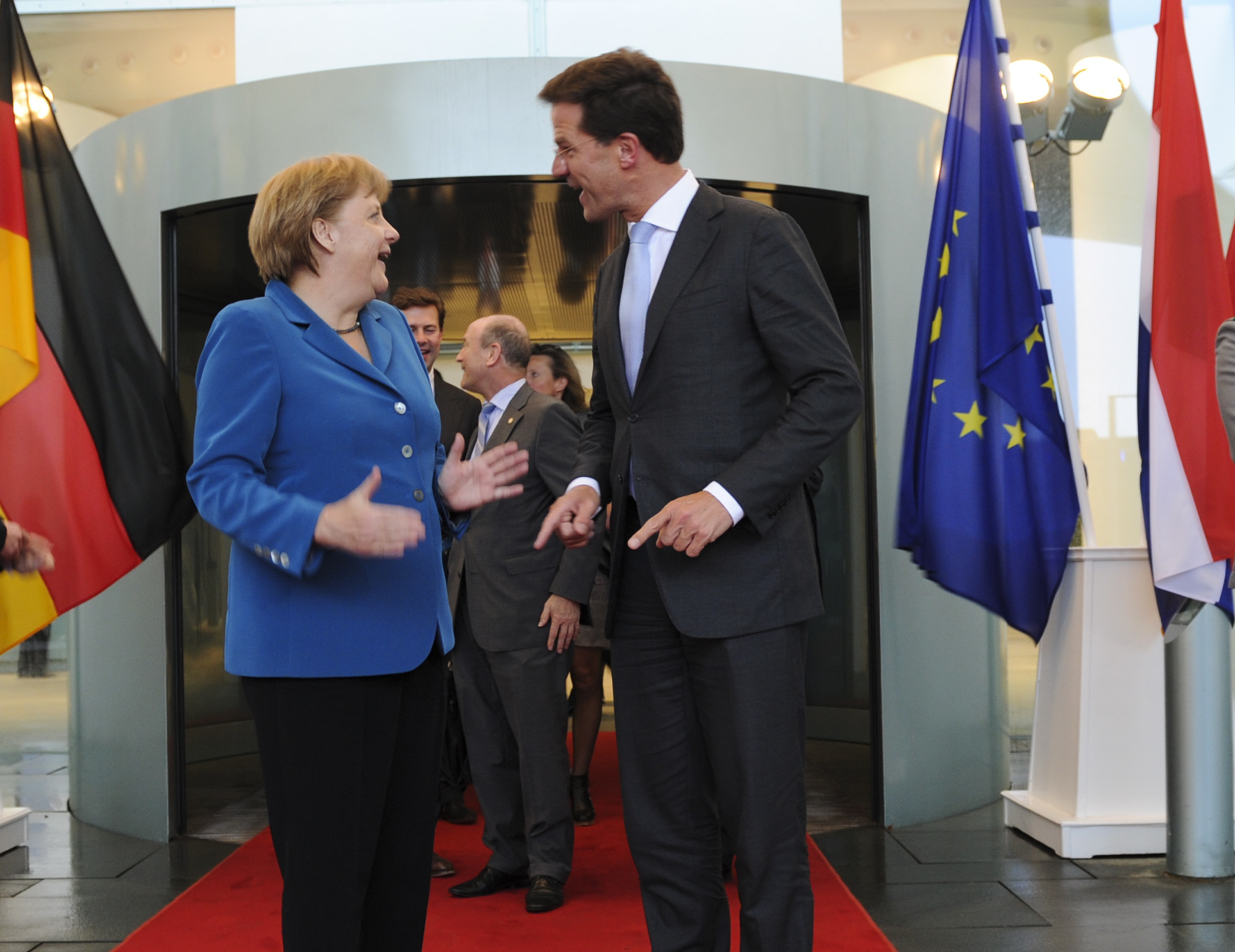
Chancellor of Germany Angela Merkel and Prime Minister Mark Rutte in Berlin on 20 June 2012.
