= Paul Blokhuis =

Dutch politician

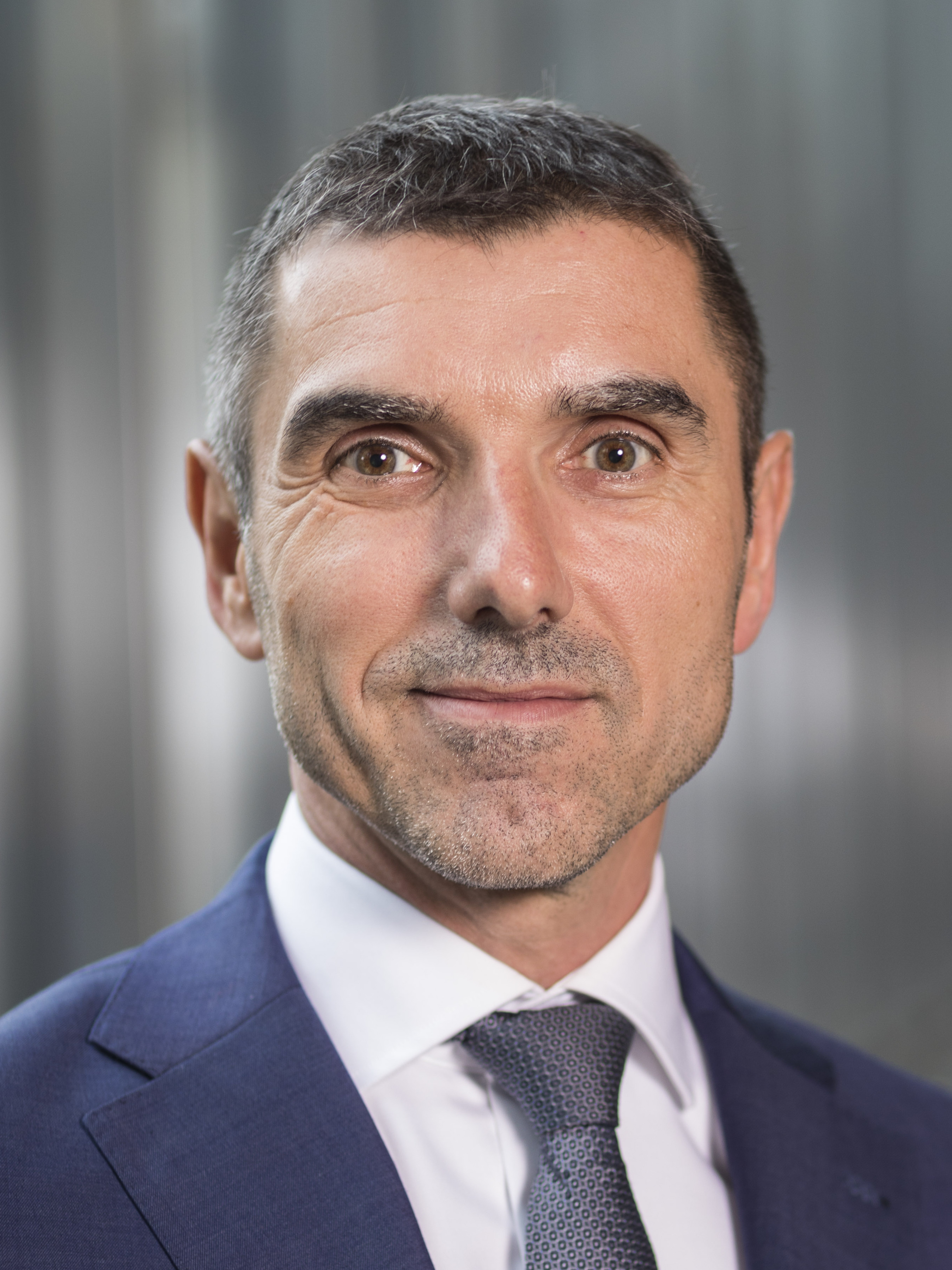
- Blokhuis in 2017

State Secretary for Health, Welfare and Sport
- In office 26 October 2017 – 10 January 2022
- Prime Minister: Mark Rutte
- Preceded by: Martin van Rijn
- Succeeded by: Maarten van Ooijen

Personal details
- Born: Paulus Blokhuis; 14 November 1963 (age 62) Zuidhorn, Netherlands
- Party: Christian Union
- Education: Leiden University

Paulus "Paul" Blokhuis (born 14 November 1963) is a Dutch politician who served as State Secretary for Health, Welfare and Sport in the Third Rutte cabinet from 2017 to 2022. He is a member of the Christian Union (CU).

== Family and education ==
Paul Blokhuis was born in Zuidhorn as the son of the Dutch-reformed reverend Bert Blokhuis, who officiated in the country's northern countryside. He was raised in Wezep and Schiedam. He has seven siblings, including music expert and journalist Leo Blokhuis and twin brother Rev. Fred Blokhuis.

His daughter, Julia, 18, died in February 2018 a few days after being admitted to the University Medical Center in Utrecht with severe cognitive loss symptoms, believed to be caused by an autoimmune disease. She was the youngest of Blokhuis and his wife Ida's four daughters.

Blokhuis studied history at Leiden University.

== Career ==
In 1990, he started as employee of the Reformatory Political Federation (RPF) faction in the House of Representatives, and later worked for the Christian Union, a merger of the small Christian parties RPF and Reformed Political League (GPV). He developed himself as specialist on infrastructure and water management, social policy and economy. Between 1988 and 1993, he chaired RPF-jongeren, the youth organisation of the RPF, which expanded under his chairmanship. He also chaired the CU electoral associations in Wapenveld, Heerde and Woerden.

== Political involvement ==
=== Local politics ===
Starting in 1998, Blokhuis was representing the CU in two city council committees in Apeldoorn. In the 2003 general election, he was placed 19th on the party's list of candidates for the House of Representatives.

Blokhuis was elected the same year to the States-Provincial of Gelderland. He was the party's lijsttrekker in the 2006 municipal elections in Apeldoorn; three councillors were elected. Blokhuis became the alderman in charge of Welfare, Health, Services and Facilities. After the elections of 2010, he retained his position.

Blokhuis resigned on 9 February 2012 together with three other aldermen after the publication of a report on the loss of millions by the municipality in selling property. His resignation was accepted on 10 March; two weeks later, he was re-appointed after new negotiations for a coalition. In 2016, he was involved in discussions around the permission for more gambling machines in the city, which he objected to. As a majority of the municipal council was in favor of the decision, he noted an official objection in the records but did not formally oppose the decision.

=== National politics ===
On 26 October 2017, after the finalisation of the negotiations on a coalition including the CU for the national government, Blokhuis was announced as State Secretary for Health, Welfare and Sports in the Third Rutte cabinet. His portfolio includes Mental Healthcare, Veteran Affairs and Wellness Promotion.

In November 2018, he presented the Prevention Agreement, an agreement concluded between the government, social organizations and private companies aimed at making Dutch people healthier. One of these measures is the implementation of plain packaging for cigarettes in the Netherlands scheduled for 1 October 2020. This measure is meant to make smoking less attractive to young people in particular.

== Electoral history ==
Electoral history of Paul Blokhuis
Year	Body	Party	Pos.	Votes	Result		Ref.
Year	Body	Party	Pos.	Votes	Party seats	Individual	Ref.
2024	European Parliament	Christian Union	17 (Note: Blokhuis participated as a lijstduwer.)	3,510	0	Lost	
2026	Apeldoorn Municipal Council	Christian Union	33	166	2	Lost	

== Notes ==
Political offices
Preceded by Martin van Rijn	State Secretary for Health, Welfare and Sport; 2017–2022	Succeeded by Maarten van Ooijen
