= List of ministers of health of the Netherlands =

Minister of Health, Welfare and Sport of the Netherlands
- Minister van Volksgezondheid, Welzijn en Sport
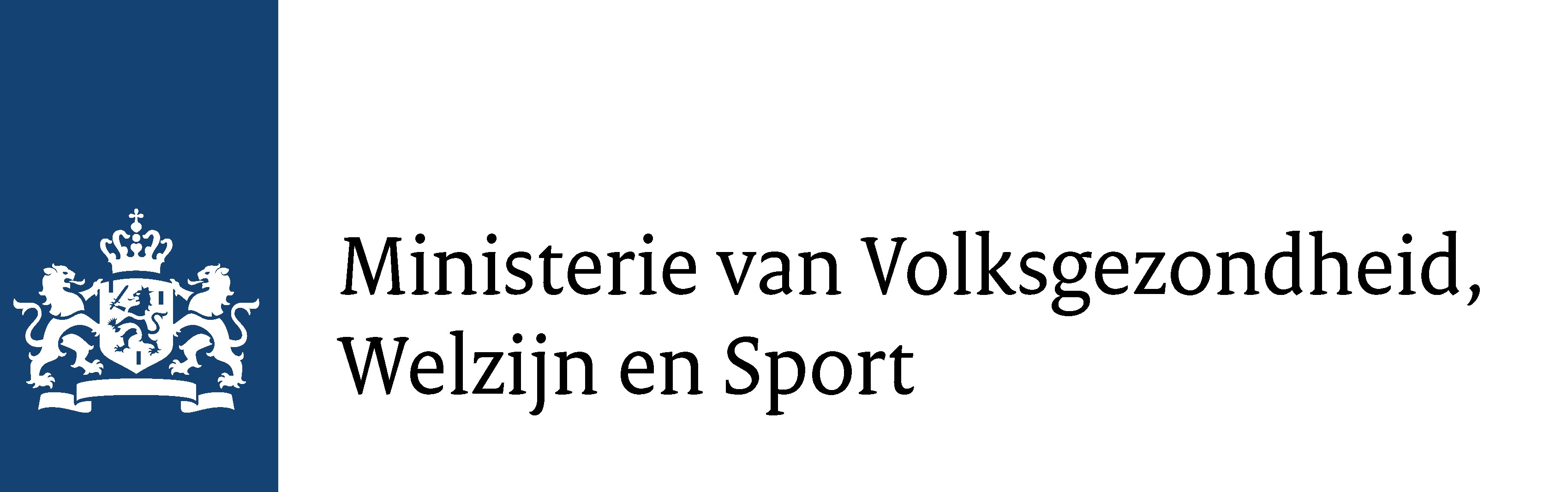
- Ministry of Health, Welfare and Sport

- Flag of the Kingdom of the Netherlands

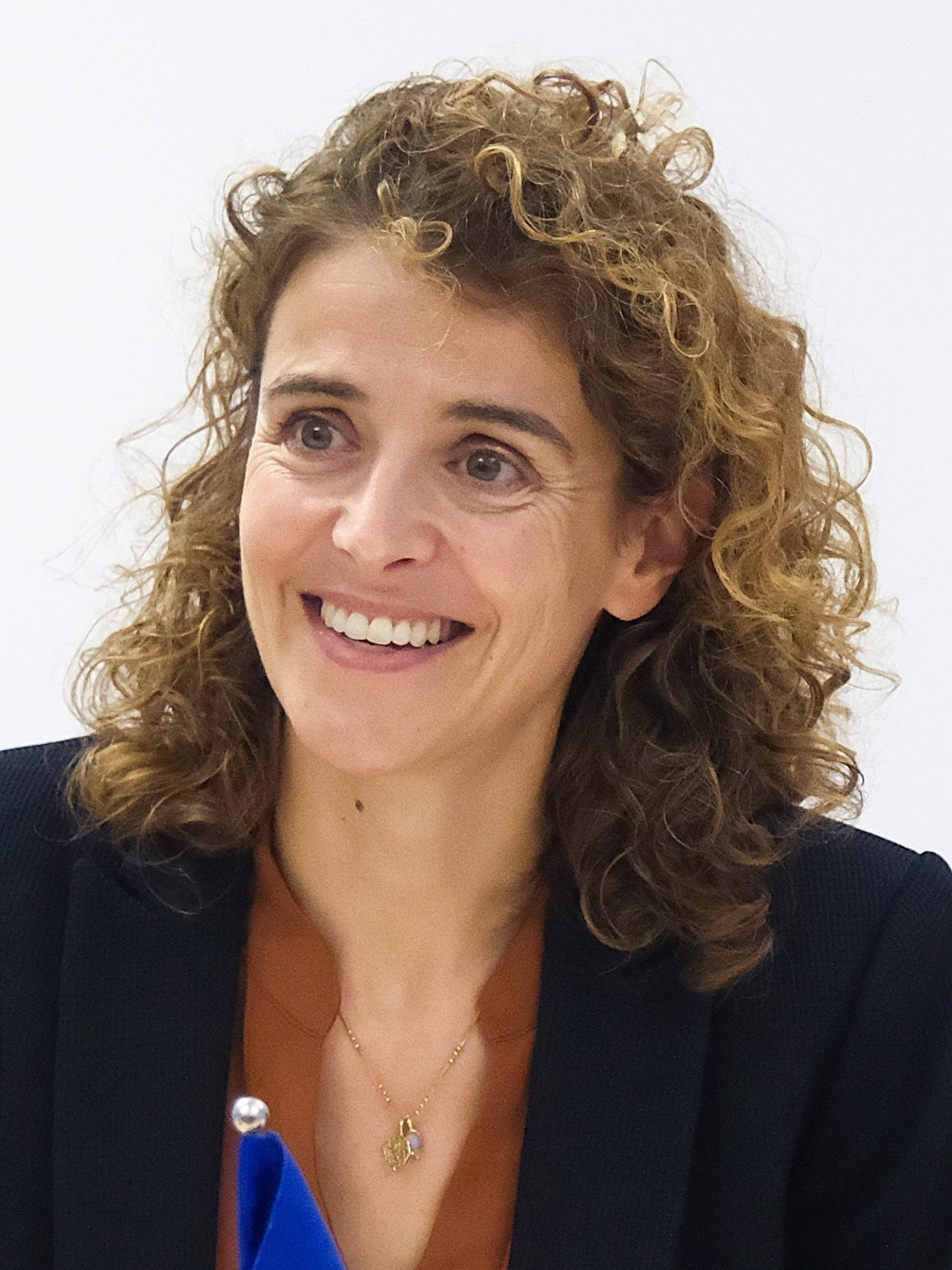
- Incumbent; Sophie Hermans since 23 February 2026
- Ministry of Health, Welfare and Sport
- Style: His/Her Excellency
- Member of: Council of Ministers
- Appointer: The monarch on advice of the prime minister
- Formation: 15 September 1951; 74 years ago
- First holder: Dolf Joekes as Minister of Social Affairs and Health
- Salary: €205,991 (As of 2025)

The minister of health, welfare and sport (Dutch: Minister van Volksgezondheid, Welzijn en Sport) is the head of the Ministry of Health, Welfare and Sport and a member of the Cabinet and the Council of Ministers. The incumbent minister is Jan Anthonie Bruijn of the People's Party for Freedom and Democracy (VVD).

Regularly, a state secretary is assigned to the ministry who is tasked with specific portfolios. The current state secretaries are Nicki Pouw-Verweij of the BBB and Judith Tielen of the People's Party for Freedom and Democracy (VVD). Respectively, they have been assigned the portfolios of long-term care and social care and of youth care, preventive care, and sport. In the past, there have also been ministers without portfolio assigned to the ministry.

== List of ministers of health ==
=== Social affairs and health (1951–1971) ===
Minister of Social Affairs and Health		Term of office	Party	Cabinet
Dolf Joekes	Dolf Joekes (1885–1962)	15 September 1951 – 2 September 1952	Labour Party	Drees I
Ko Suurhoff	Ko Suurhoff (1905–1967)	2 September 1952 – 22 December 1958	Labour Party	Drees II • III
Louis Beel	Louis Beel (Prime Minister) (1902–1985)	22 December 1958 – 19 May 1959	Catholic People's Party	Beel II
Charles van Rooy	Charles van Rooy (1912–1996)	19 May 1959 – 3 July 1961^{[Res]}	Catholic People's Party	De Quay
Victor Marijnen	Victor Marijnen (1917–1975)	3 July 1961 – 17 July 1961^{[Ad Interim]}^{[Minister]}	Catholic People's Party	De Quay
Gerard Veldkamp	Gerard Veldkamp (1921–1990)	17 July 1961 – 5 April 1967	Catholic People's Party	De Quay
Gerard Veldkamp	Gerard Veldkamp (1921–1990)	17 July 1961 – 5 April 1967	Catholic People's Party	Marijnen
Gerard Veldkamp	Gerard Veldkamp (1921–1990)	17 July 1961 – 5 April 1967	Catholic People's Party	Cals
Gerard Veldkamp	Gerard Veldkamp (1921–1990)	17 July 1961 – 5 April 1967	Catholic People's Party	Zijlstra
Bauke Roolvink	Bauke Roolvink (1912–1979)	5 April 1967 – 6 July 1971	Anti-Revolutionary Party	De Jong

=== Health and environment (1971–1982) ===
Minister of Health and Environment		Term of office	Party	Cabinet
Louis Stuyt	Louis Stuyt (1914–2000)	6 July 1971 – 11 May 1973	Catholic; People's Party	Biesheuvel I • II
Irene Vorrink	Irene Vorrink (1918–1996)	11 May 1973 – 19 December 1977	Labour Party	Den Uyl
Leendert Ginjaar	Leendert Ginjaar (1928–2003)	19 December 1977 – 11 September 1981	People's Party for Freedom and Democracy	Van Agt I
Til Gardeniers-Berendsen	Til Gardeniers- Berendsen (1925–2019)	11 September 1981 – 4 November 1982	Christian; Democratic Appeal	Van Agt II • III

=== Social affairs and health (1982–1994) ===
Minister of Welfare, Health and Culture		Term of office	Party	Cabinet
Elco Brinkman	Elco Brinkman (1948–2026)	4 November 1982 – 7 November 1989	Christian; Democratic Appeal	Lubbers I • II
Hedy d'Ancona	Hedy d'Ancona (born 1937)	7 November 1989 – 16 July 1994^{[Res]}	Labour Party	Lubbers III
Jo Ritzen	Jo Ritzen (born 1945)	16 July 1994 – 22 August 1994^{[Acting]} ^{[Minister]}	Labour Party	Lubbers III

=== Health, welfare and sport (since 1994) ===
Minister of Health, Welfare and Sport		Term of office	Party	Cabinet
Els Borst	Els Borst (1932–2014)^{[Deputy]}	22 August 1994 – 22 July 2002	Democrats 66	Kok I • II
Eduard Bomhoff	Eduard Bomhoff (born 1944)^{[Deputy]}	22 July 2002 – 16 October 2002^{[Res]}	Pim Fortuyn List	Balkenende I
Aart Jan de Geus	Aart Jan de Geus (born 1955)	16 October 2002 – 27 May 2003^{[Acting]} ^{[Minister]}	Christian; Democratic Appeal	Balkenende I
Hans Hoogervorst	Hans Hoogervorst (born 1956)	27 May 2003 – 22 February 2007	People's Party for Freedom and Democracy	Balkenende II • III
Ab Klink	Ab Klink (born 1958)	22 February 2007 – 14 October 2010	Christian; Democratic Appeal	Balkenende IV
Edith Schippers	Edith Schippers (born 1964)	14 October 2010 – 26 October 2017	People's Party for Freedom and Democracy	Rutte I • II
Hugo de Jonge	Hugo de Jonge (born 1977)^{[Deputy]}	26 October 2017 – 10 January 2022	Christian; Democratic Appeal	Rutte III
Ernst Kuipers	Ernst Kuipers (born 1959)	10 January 2022 – 10 January 2024^{[Res]}	Democrats 66	Rutte IV
Conny Helder	Conny Helder (born 1958)	10 January 2024 – 2 July 2024	People's Party for Freedom and Democracy	Rutte IV
Fleur Agema	Fleur Agema (born 1976)^{[Deputy]}	2 July 2024 – 3 June 2025^{[Res]}	Party for Freedom	Schoof
Edddy van Hijum	Eddy van Hijum (born 1972)^{[Deputy]}	3 June 2025 – 19 June 2025^{[Acting]} ^{[Minister]}	New Social Contract	Schoof
	Daniëlle Jansen (born 1970)	19 June 2025 – 22 August 2025^{[Res]}	New Social Contract	Schoof
Robert Tieman	Robert Tieman (born 1976)	22 August 2025 – 5 September 2025^{[Acting]} ^{[Minister]}	Farmer–Citizen Movement	Schoof
	Jan Anthonie; Bruijn (born 1958)	5 September 2025 – 23 February 2026	People's Party for Freedom and Democracy	Schoof
	Sophie Hermans (born 1981)	23 February 2026 – Incumbent	People's Party for Freedom and Democracy	Jetten

^{Resigned}
^{Acting}
^{Ad Interim}
^{Deputy Prime Minister}
^{Deputy Prime Minister from 1998 until 2002}
^{Minister of Agriculture and Fisheries}
^{Minister of Education and Sciences}
^{Minister of Social Affairs and Employment}
^{Minister of Infrastructure and Water Management}
^{Resigned following election to the European Parliament}

== List of ministers without portfolio ==
Ministers without Portfolio		Portfolio	Term of office	Party	Cabinet
André Rouvoet	André Rouvoet (born 1962)^{[Deputy]}	• Youth care • Family policy	22 February 2007 – 14 October 2010 (Minister of Education, Culture and Science in 2010)	Christian Union	Balkenende IV
Bruno Bruins	Bruno Bruins (born 1963)	• Primary healthcare • Medical ethics • Pharmaceutical policy • Sport • Corona management (Bruins only)	26 October 2017 – 19 March 2020 (Resigned)	People's Party for Freedom and Democracy	Rutte III
Martin van Rijn	Martin van Rijn (born 1956)	• Primary healthcare • Medical ethics • Pharmaceutical policy • Sport • Corona management (Bruins only)	23 March 2020 – 9 July 2020	Independent (Labour Party)	Rutte III
Tamara van Ark	Tamara van Ark (born 1974)	• Primary healthcare • Medical ethics • Pharmaceutical policy • Sport • Corona management (Bruins only)	9 July 2020 – 3 September 2021 (Resigned)	People's Party for Freedom and Democracy	Rutte III
Conny Helder	Conny Helder (born 1958)	• Primary Healthcare • Long-term care • Sport	10 January 2022 – 10 January 2024	People's Party for Freedom and Democracy	Rutte IV
Pia Dijkstra	Pia Dijkstra (born 1954)	• Primary healthcare • Medical ethics • Health insurance • Pharmaceutical policy • Corona management	2 February 2024 – 2 July 2024	Democrats 66	Rutte IV
Mirjam Sterk	Mirjam Sterk (born 1973)	• Long-term care • Youth care • Sport	23 February 2026 – Incumbent	Christian Democratic Appeal	Jetten

== List of state secretaries for health ==
State Secretary for Social Affairs		Portfolio(s)	Term of office	Party	Cabinet
Piet Muntendam	Piet Muntendam (1901–1986)	• Primary healthcare • Elderly care • Disability policy	1 April 1950 – 15 September 1951	Labour Party	Drees–Van Schaik
Aat van Rhijn	Aat van Rhijn (1892–1986)	• Social security • Unemployment • Occupational safety • Social services	15 February 1950 – 15 September 1951	Labour Party	Drees–Van Schaik
State Secretary for Social Affairs and Health		Portfolio(s)	Term of office	Party	Cabinet
Piet Muntendam	Piet Muntendam (1901–1986)	• Primary healthcare • Elderly care • Disability policy	15 September 1951 – 1 October 1953^{[Res]}	Labour Party	Drees I • II
Aat van Rhijn	Aat van Rhijn (1892–1986)	• Social security • Unemployment • Occupational safety • Social services	15 September 1951 – 22 December 1958	Labour Party	Drees I • II • III
Bauke Roolvink	Bauke Roolvink (1912–1979)	• Social security • Unemployment • Occupational safety • Social services	15 June 1959 – 24 July 1963	Anti-Revolutionary Party	De Quay
Louis Bartels	Louis Bartels (1915–2002)	• Primary healthcare • Elderly care • Disability policy • Medical ethics	3 September 1963 – 5 April 1967	Catholic People's Party	Marijnen
Louis Bartels	Louis Bartels (1915–2002)	• Primary healthcare • Elderly care • Disability policy • Medical ethics	3 September 1963 – 5 April 1967	Catholic People's Party	Cals
Louis Bartels	Louis Bartels (1915–2002)	• Primary healthcare • Elderly care • Disability policy • Medical ethics	3 September 1963 – 5 April 1967	Catholic People's Party	Zijlstra
José de Meijer	José de Meijer (1915–2000)	• Occupational safety • Public organisations	15 November 1963 – 5 April 1967	Catholic People's Party	Marijnen
José de Meijer	José de Meijer (1915–2000)	• Occupational safety • Public organisations	15 November 1963 – 5 April 1967	Catholic People's Party	Cals
José de Meijer	José de Meijer (1915–2000)	• Occupational safety • Public organisations	15 November 1963 – 5 April 1967	Catholic People's Party	Zijlstra
Roelof Kruisinga	Roelof Kruisinga (1922–2012)	• Primary healthcare • Elderly care • Disability policy • Medical ethics	18 April 1967 – 6 July 1971	Christian Historical Union	De Jong
State Secretary for Health and Environment		Portfolio	Term of office	Party	Cabinet
Jo Hendriks	Jo Hendriks (1923–2001)	• Primary healthcare • Elderly care • Disability policy	11 May 1973 – 19 December 1977	Catholic People's Party	Den Uyl
Els Veder-Smit	Els Veder-Smit (1921–2020)	• Primary healthcare • Elderly care • Disability policy • Medical ethics • Food policy	3 January 1978 – 11 September 1981	People's Party for Freedom and Democracy	Van Agt I
Ineke Lambers-Hacquebard	Ineke Lambers-Hacquebard (1946–2014)	• Environmental policy • Food policy	11 September 1981 – 4 November 1982	Democrats 66	Van Agt II • III
State Secretary for Welfare, Health and Culture		Portfolio(s)	Term of office	Party	Cabinet
Joop van der Reijden	Joop van der Reijden (1927–2006)	• Primary healthcare • Social services • Elderly care • Disability policy • Medical ethics	5 November 1982 – 14 July 1986	Christian Democratic Appeal	Lubbers I
Dick Dees	Dick Dees (born 1944)	• Primary healthcare • Social services	14 July 1986 – 7 November 1989	People's Party for Freedom and Democracy	Lubbers II
	Hans Simons (1947–2019)	• Primary healthcare • Elderly care • Youth care • Disability policy	7 November 1989 – 26 February 1994^{[Res]}	Labour Party	Lubbers III
State Secretary for Health, Welfare and Sport		Portfolio(s)	Term of office	Party	Cabinet
Erica Terpstra	Erica Terpstra (born 1943)	• Social services • Elderly care • Youth care • Disability policy • Minorities • Food policy • Recreation • Sport	22 August 1994 – 28 June 1998	People's Party for Freedom and Democracy	Kok I
Margo Vliegenthart	Margo Vliegenthart (born 1958)	• Elderly care • Youth care • Disability policy • Pharmaceutical policy • Sport	3 August 1998 – 22 July 2002	Labour Party	Kok II
	Clémence Ross-van Dorp (born 1957)	• Elderly care • Youth care • Disability policy • Medical ethics • Sport	22 July 2002 – 22 February 2007	Christian Democratic Appeal	Balkenende I • II • III
Jet Bussemaker	Jet Bussemaker (born 1961)	• Elderly care • Youth care • Disability policy • Medical ethics • Sport	22 February 2007 – 23 February 2010^{[Res]}	Labour Party	Balkenende IV
Marlies Veldhuijzen van Zanten	Marlies Veldhuijzen van Zanten (born 1953)	• Elderly care • Youth care • Disability policy • Medical ethics • Pharmaceutical policy	14 October 2010 – 5 November 2012	Christian Democratic Appeal	Rutte I
Martin van Rijn	Martin van Rijn (born 1956)	• Elderly care • Youth care • Disability policy • Medical ethics • Pharmaceutical policy	5 November 2012 – 26 October 2017	Labour Party	Rutte II
Paul Blokhuis	Paul Blokhuis (born 1963)	• Social services • Disability policy	26 October 2017 – 10 January 2022	Christian Union	Rutte III
	Maarten van Ooijen (born 1990)	• Youth care • Preventive care	10 January 2022 – 2 July 2024	Christian Union	Rutte IV
Vicky Maeijer	Vicky Maeijer (born 1986)	• Long-term care • Social care	2 July 2024 – 3 June 2025	Party for Freedom	Schoof
	Nicki Pouw-Verweij (born 1991)	• Long-term care • Social care	19 June 2025 – Incumbent	Farmer–Citizen Movement	Schoof
	Vincent Karremans (born 1986)	• Youth care • Preventive care • Sport	2 July 2024 – 18 June 2025	People's Party for Freedom and Democracy	Schoof
	Judith Tielen	• Youth care • Preventive care • Sport	19 June 2025 – 23 February 2026	People's Party for Freedom and Democracy	Schoof

^{Resigned}
