= Medy van der Laan =

Dutch politician

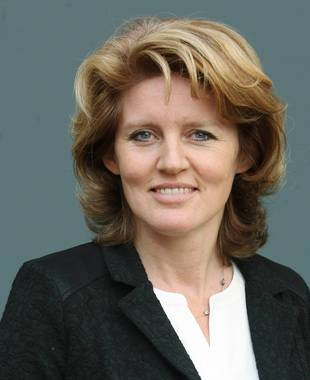
- Van der Laan in 2015

State Secretary for Education, Culture and Science
- In office 27 May 2003 – 3 July 2006 Serving with Annette Nijs (2003–2004), Mark Rutte (2004–2006) and Bruno Bruins (2006)
- Prime Minister: Jan Peter Balkenende
- Preceded by: Cees van Leeuwen
- Succeeded by: Marja van Bijsterveldt; Sharon Dijksma

Personal details
- Born: Medy Catharina van der Laan; 14 August 1968 (age 58) Spijkenisse, Netherlands
- Party: Democrats 66 (since 1994)
- Education: Radboud University Nijmegen

Medy Catharina van der Laan (born 14 August 1968) is a Dutch businesswoman, former civil servant and retired politician who served as State Secretary at the Ministry of Education, Culture and Science in charge of culture, media and art under Prime Minister Jan Peter Balkenende's second cabinet (2003–2006). A member of the Democrats 66 (D66) party, which she joined in 1994, she previously was an assistant to State Secretary Jacob Kohnstamm at the Ministry of Foreign Affairs. Van der Laan first joined the Ministry of the Interior in 1991 as a civil servant.

== Career ==
A native of Spijkenisse, Medy van der Laan studied Dutch law at Radboud University Nijmegen (then Catholic University Nijmegen), where she graduated in 1990. She then worked as a civil servant for the government until her appointment as State Secretary for Education, Culture and Science under the Second Balkenende cabinet in 2003. She retained the office until she presented her resignation to Queen Beatrix in 2006 alongside those of Alexander Pechtold and Laurens Jan Brinkhorst, which led to the fall of the cabinet.

In 2015, Van der Laan became chairwoman of the trade association Energie-Nederland. In 2021, she became chairwoman of the Dutch Association of Banks (NVB) and entered the Social and Economic Council (SER).

Preceded by Cees van Leeuwen	State Secretary for Education, Culture and Science; 2003–2006; Served alongside: Annette Nijs (2003–2004); Mark Rutte (2004–2006); Bruno Bruins (2006)	Succeeded by Marja van Bijsterveldt; Sharon Dijksma
