= Martin van Rijn =

Dutch politician who served as Minister for Medical Care from March to July 2020

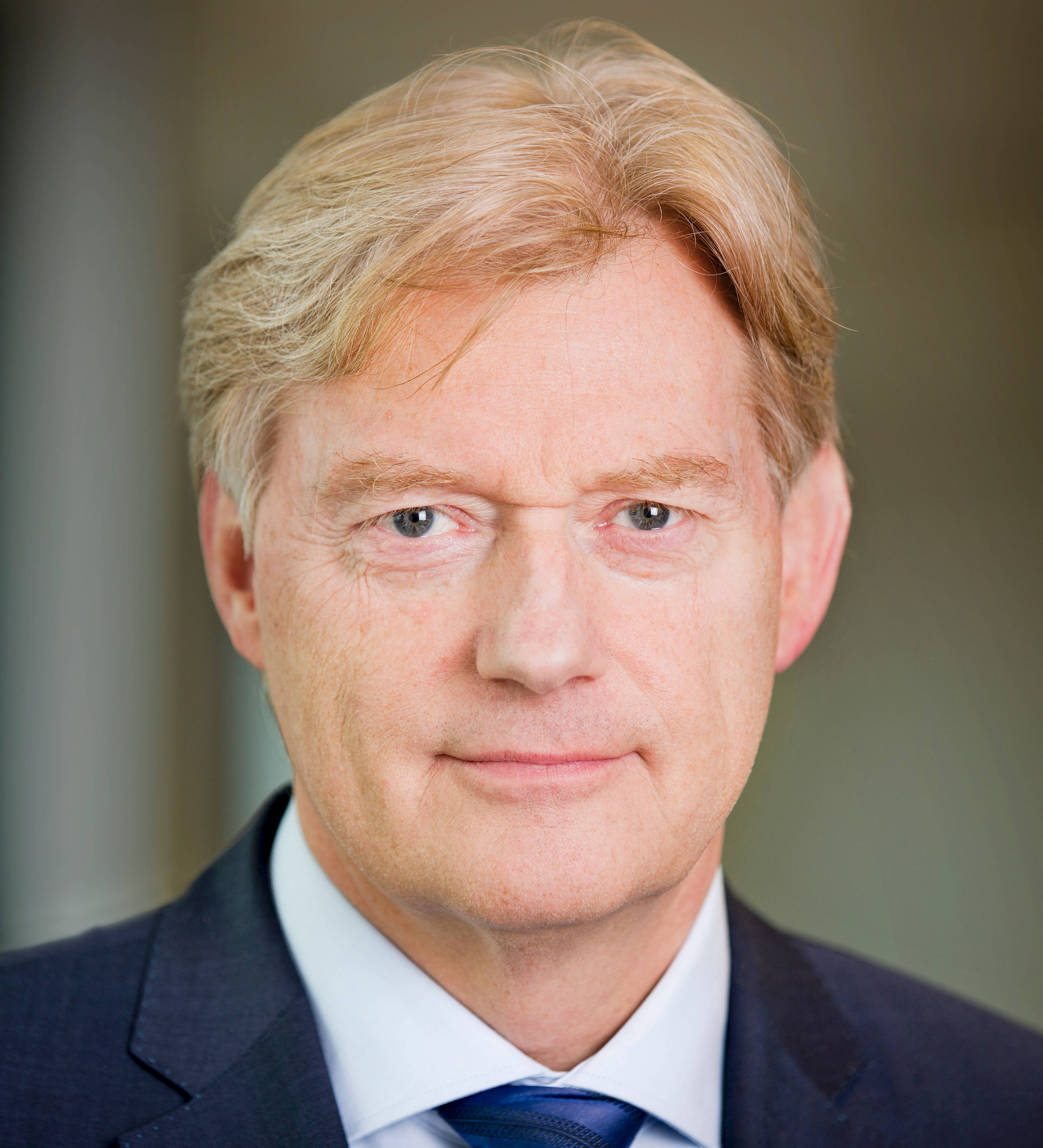
- Van Rijn in 2015

Minister for Medical Care
- In office 20 March 2020 – 9 July 2020
- Prime Minister: Mark Rutte
- Preceded by: Bruno Bruins
- Succeeded by: Tamara van Ark

State Secretary for Health, Welfare and Sport
- In office 5 November 2012 – 26 October 2017
- Prime Minister: Mark Rutte
- Preceded by: Marlies Veldhuijzen van Zanten
- Succeeded by: Paul Blokhuis

Personal details
- Born: Maarten Johannes van Rijn; 7 February 1956 (age 70) Rotterdam, Netherlands
- Party: Labour Party
- Education: Erasmus University Rotterdam (Bachelor of Economics, Master of Economics)
- Occupation: Politician · Civil servant · Businessman · Corporate director

Maarten Johannes "Martin" van Rijn (born 7 February 1956) is a Dutch politician and businessman who served as Minister for Medical Care from March to July 2020. A member of the Labour Party (PvdA), he previously was CEO and chairman of the Reinier Haga Groep (a hospital conglomerate) from 1 December 2017. He served as State Secretary at the Ministry of Health, Welfare and Sport, dealing with nursing and care, elderly policy, youth policy and biotechnology in the Second Rutte cabinet, from November 2012 to October 2017. Prior to this, he was CEO of the PGGM pension fund (2008–2012).

== Career ==
In his capacity as a civil servant he was Director-General for health care at the Ministry of Health, Welfare and Sport from 2003 to 2007, Director-General for management and personnel policy at the Ministry of the Interior and Kingdom Relations from 2000 to 2003 and Deputy Director-General for housing at the Ministry of Housing, Spatial Planning and the Environment from 1995 to 2000.

Van Rijn studied economics at Erasmus University Rotterdam. On 15 November 2017 he was named president of the directing board of Reinier Haga Groep, managing hospitals in The Hague, Delft and Zoetermeer. On 20 March 2020, he was appointed as a replacement to the role of Minister of Medical Care due to the resignation of Bruno Bruins who collapsed from exhaustion during a parliamentary debate. He indicated he would sit on a non-partisan basis, as the Labour Party does not support the Third Rutte cabinet (a non supporting party member as minister is highly unusual in Dutch politics). He remains a member of the PvdA.

In 2025, Van Rijn was asked by the government to mediate in collective bargaining for pharmacy workers. Upon the announcement, unions canceled a planned strike.

== Decorations ==
Honours
Ribbon bar	Honour	Country	Date
	Officer of the Order of Orange-Nassau	Netherlands	30 April 2008

Civic offices
Unknown	Deputy Director-General for Housing of the Ministry of Housing, Spatial; Planning and the Environment; 1995–2000	Unknown
Unknown	Director-General for Management and Personnel; Affairs of the Ministry of the Interior and Kingdom Relations; 2000–2003	Unknown
Unknown	Director-General for Healthcare of the Ministry of Health, Welfare and Sport; 2003–2007	Unknown
Political offices
Preceded by Marlies Veldhuijzen van Zanten	State Secretary for Health, Welfare and Sport; 2012–2017	Succeeded by Paul Blokhuis
Preceded by Bruno Bruins	Minister for Medical Care; 2020	Succeeded by Tamara van Ark
Business positions
Preceded by Office established	CEO and Chairman of PGGM; 2008–2012	Succeeded by Edwin Velzel
Preceded by Chiel Huffmeijer	CEO and Chairman of the Reinier Haga Groep; 2017–present	Vacant
