= Jet Bussemaker =

Dutch politician (born 1961)

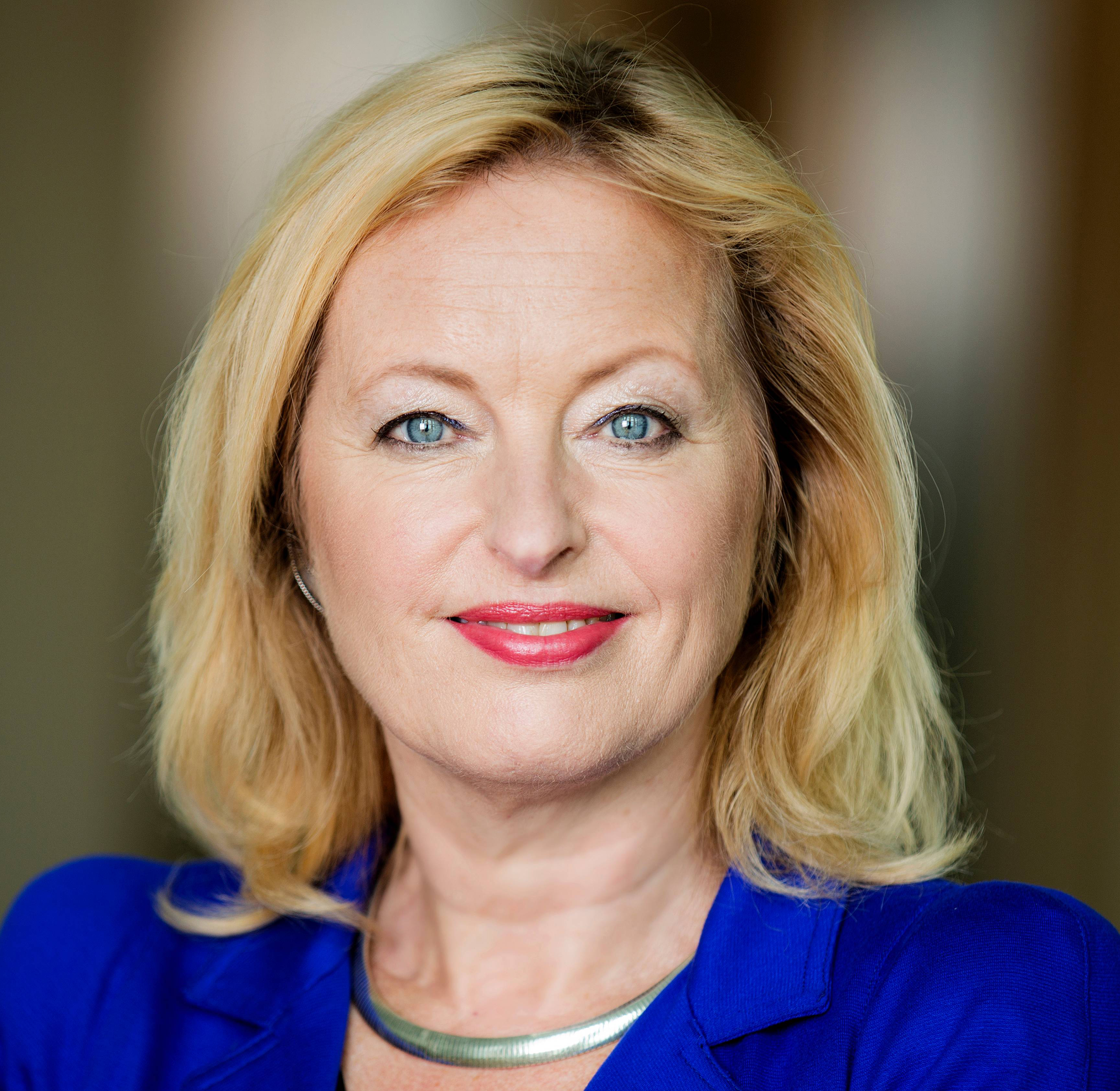
- Bussemaker in 2015

Minister of Education, Culture and Science
- In office 5 November 2012 – 26 October 2017
- Cabinet: Rutte II
- Preceded by: Marja van Bijsterveldt
- Succeeded by: Ingrid van Engelshoven

State Secretary for Health, Welfare and Sport
- In office 22 February 2007 – 23 February 2010
- Cabinet: Balkenende IV
- Preceded by: Clémence Ross-van Dorp
- Succeeded by: Marlies Veldhuijzen van Zanten

Member of the House of Representatives
- In office 19 May 1998 – 22 February 2007

Personal details
- Born: Mariëtte Bussemaker; 15 January 1961 (age 65) Capelle aan den IJssel, Netherlands
- Party: Labour Party (since 1997)
- Other political affiliations: GroenLinks (1992–1995)
- Children: 1 child
- Education: University of Amsterdam
- Occupation: Politician · Political scientist · Researcher · Academic administrator · Author · Professor

Mariëtte "Jet" Bussemaker (born 15 January 1961) is a retired Dutch politician. A member of the Labour Party (PvdA), she served as Minister of Education, Culture and Science from 5 November 2012 to 26 October 2017 in the Second Rutte cabinet. She has been a professor of Science, Policy, Social Impact and Healthcare at Leiden University since 1 July 2018.

== Biography ==
=== Early life ===
Mariëtte Bussemaker was born on 15 January 1961 in Capelle aan den IJssel in the province of South Holland as the daughter of Henk Bussemaker (1928–2018) and Elly Verduyn den Boer (1932–2017). Bussemaker attended primary and secondary education at the Rijnlands Lyceum in Oegstgeest. She subsequently studied at the University of Amsterdam, where she obtained a Bachelor of Social Science and a Master of Social Science cum laude in political science (specializing in Political philosophy). In 1993, Bussemaker received a Doctor of Philosophy degree in political and social-cultural sciences at the same university. Between 1993 and 1998 she was assistant professor of political science at the University of Amsterdam. She had been a member of the GreenLeft (GL) party during that period, but in 1995 she left it to join the Labour Party (PvdA) in 1997.

== Political career ==
In the 1998 elections Bussemaker was elected into the House of Representatives. She specialized in employment policy, health care and taxes. In 2000 she was co-initiator of a proposal to allow conscientious objection for working on Sundays. This proposal became law in 2002. She remained assistant professor during her membership of the House of Representatives, now at the Vrije Universiteit Amsterdam.

After the election of 2006, Bussemaker was asked to become State Secretary for Health, Welfare and Sport in the Balkenende IV cabinet. Bussemaker accepted and resigned as assistant professor the same day she took office as the new State Secretary for Health, Welfare and Sport on 22 February 2007. In May 2008, Bussemaker received strong criticism from MPs and fellow cabinet members after stating for the radio that she supported 2008 American Presidential candidate Barack Obama, and that she would consider the election of his Republican competitor John McCain to be a disaster. She did this in defiance of a ban on cabinet members discussing foreign politics in a personal capacity, instituted earlier after Bussemaker's fellow Dutch Labour party member and Finance Minister Wouter Bos expressed a similar sympathy for Barack Obama. On 20 February 2010 the Balkenende IV cabinet fell and Bussemaker and the rest of the Labour Party cabinet members resigned on 23 February 2010.

In January 2011 it was announced that Bussemaker would be part of the board of the Amsterdam University of Applied Sciences (which includes the International Business School and the Johan Cruyff University) and the University of Amsterdam, (they share the same board), she would also be dean at the University of Applied Sciences. In December 2011 Jet Bussemaker and the board received heavy criticism for apparently allowing or not being able to curb widespread diploma fraud at the University of Applied Sciences.

Bussemaker gave the 2013 Mosse Lecture, titled Grenzen aan homo-emancipatiebeleid: burgerwacht of politieagent? – Over de 'red lines' van het homo-emancipatiebeleid (Limits to gay emancipation policy: civilian or police officer? - About the 'red lines' of the gay emancipation policy).

== Decorations ==
Honours
Ribbon bar	Honour	Country	Date	Comment
	Officer of the Order of Orange-Nassau	Netherlands	14 February 2018	Elevated from Knight (23 November 2010)

Political offices
Preceded by Clémence Ross-van Dorp	State Secretary for Health, Welfare and Sport; 2007–2010	Succeeded by Marlies Veldhuijzen van Zanten
Preceded by Marja van Bijsterveldt	Minister of Education, Culture and Science; 2012–2017	Succeeded by Ingrid van Engelshoven
Academic offices
Preceded by Unknown	President of the Council of the University of Amsterdam; 2011–2012	Succeeded by Louise Gunning; Ad interim
Preceded by Unknown	Rector Magnificus of the Amsterdam University of Applied Sciences; 2011–2012	Succeeded by Louise Gunning; Ad interim
