= Third Rutte cabinet =

Cabinet of the Netherlands, 2017 to 2022

- Cabinet of the Netherlands

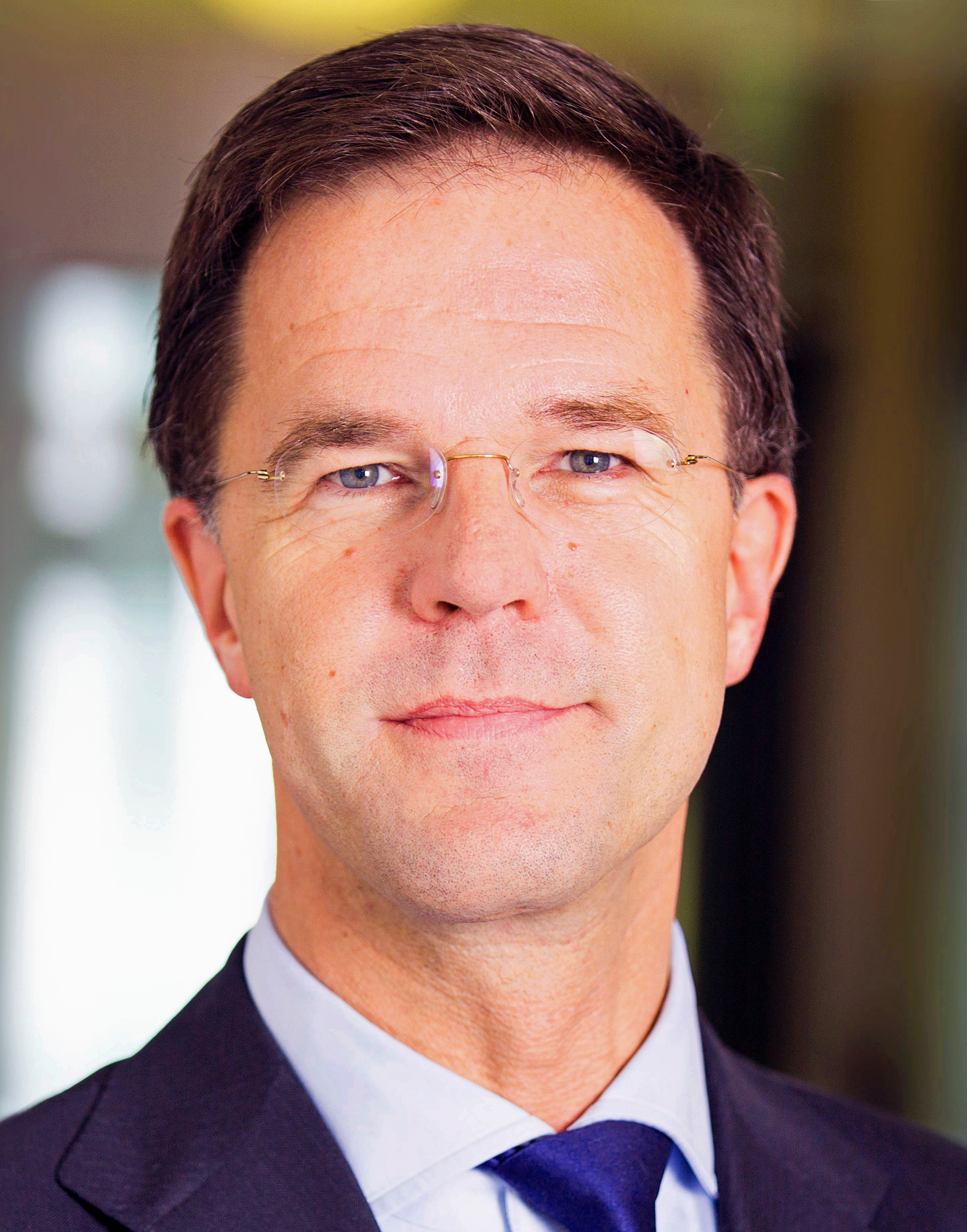
- Date formed: 26 October 2017
- Date dissolved: 10 January 2022; 4 years, 76 days in office (demissionary from 15 January 2021)

People and organisations
- Monarch: Willem-Alexander
- Prime Minister: Mark Rutte
- Deputy Prime Minister: Hugo de Jonge; Kajsa Ollongren (Note: Wouter Koolmees in an acting capacity, 1 November 2019 – 14 May 2020.); Carola Schouten
- Total no. of members: 16
- Member party: People's Party for Freedom and Democracy (VVD); Christian Democratic Appeal (CDA); Democrats 66 (D66); Christian Union (CU)
- Status in legislature: Centre to centre-right coalition government

History
- Incoming formation: 2017 formation
- Outgoing formation: 2021–2022 formation
- Election: 2017 election
- Outgoing election: 2021 election
- Legislature terms: 2017–2021
- Predecessor: Second Rutte cabinet
- Successor: Fourth Rutte cabinet

The third Rutte cabinet was the cabinet of the Netherlands from 26 October 2017 until 10 January 2022 (since 15 January 2021 demissionary). It was formed by a coalition government of the political parties People's Party for Freedom and Democracy (VVD), Christian Democratic Appeal (CDA), Democrats 66 (D66) and Christian Union (CU) after the general election of 2017.

The cabinet served during the late 2010s and the start of the 2020s. Notable issues during the third Rutte cabinet included the childcare allowance affair (Dutch: toeslagenaffaire), the farmers' protests and the COVID-19 pandemic in the Netherlands. The cabinet fell on 15 January 2021 as a response to a critical report about the childcare allowance affair.

== Formation ==
The 2017 general election resulted in a House of Representatives where at least four parties would be required to form a coalition with a majority (76 seats). Media sources speculated that incumbent Prime Minister Mark Rutte of the VVD would seek to form a government with the support of the centre-right CDA and liberal D66. The CU was thought to be the most likely candidate to be the fourth member of the coalition. Minister of Health, Welfare and Sport, Edith Schippers, was selected by the VVD to serve as the party's informateur on 16 March and appointed by Speaker of the House Khadija Arib, seeking to determine whether Jesse Klaver of GroenLinks (GL) solely desired a left-wing government, or instead simply viewed the VVD as an unlikely coalition partner. Similarly, talks with Emile Roemer of the Socialist Party (SP), who repeatedly stated during the campaign that his party would not govern with the VVD, remained a possibility.

The leaders of D66, the CDA, the PvdA, the VVD, the SP, GL and the CU stated that they would not enter a coalition with the PVV; Roemer also said that the SP would not join a coalition with the VVD.

The first proposed coalition was one involving the VVD-CDA-D66 and GL. This was the preferred coalition of Alexander Pechtold, Lodewijk Asscher and Gert-Jan Segers, while Jesse Klaver continued to argue that the major policy differences between GL and the VVD would make a coalition difficult. Nevertheless, the four parties began more serious negotiations toward a coalition agreement. The Nederlandse Omroep Stichting (NOS) reported that "labour market reform, investment in law enforcement and additional money for nursing homes" would be areas of agreement between the parties, while "refugee policy, income distribution, climate and medical ethics issues are potential stumbling blocks".

On 15 May, talks on the proposed four-way VVD-CDA-D66-GL coalition failed. It was reported that the main dispute concerned immigration, but GL Leader Jesse Klaver cited climate issues and income differences as other issues where the parties disagreed. The end of the talks was reported to be a consensus decision, with no party blaming any others.

Coalition talks were reported to be at an impasse, with the VVD and CDA favouring a coalition with the CU, D66 favouring a coalition with either the PvdA or the SP, the SP being absolutely opposed to a coalition with the VVD, the CDA being opposed to a coalition without the VVD, the PvdA rejecting any coalition, and all parties with more than five seats rejecting a coalition with the PVV. D66 said that it would consider a coalition with the CU very difficult due to disagreements on medical-ethical issues such as doctor-assisted suicide, due to the lack of representation of the political left within that coalition, and due to the small majority of one seat in both chambers, which could make for an unstable coalition.

In late June 2017, discussions began again between the VVD, D66, the CDA and the CU under the lead of new informateur Herman Tjeenk Willink. After a three-week summer break, talks resumed on 9 August 2017, and were reported to be close to a conclusion due to representatives of unions and employers' organizations joining the discussions, which typically happens near the end of such negotiations. In September 2017, a budget deal compromise was reached allowing the coalition talks to continue. While still 'close to conclusion', it appeared likely that the talks about government formation would exceed the record since World War II of 208 days set in 1977. After 208 days of negotiations, the VVD, D66, CDA and CU agreed to a coalition under a third informateur, Gerrit Zalm, and all members of the House of Representatives of the involved parties approved the agreement on 9 October 2017. On 26 October the new cabinet was formally installed, 225 days after the elections, setting a record for the longest cabinet formation in Dutch history.

On 7 October 2019, the government lost its majority when Wybren van Haga, after being expelled from Rutte's VVD party for allegedly renovating a building he owned without the necessary permits, decided to sit as an independent. Had he resigned, another member on the VVD electoral party list would have replaced him, maintaining Rutte's parliamentary majority of one. According to Politico EU, Van Haga wrote he would vote with the government on established coalition policy, but would make his own decisions on future laws.

== Policy ==
=== Government ===
The Third Rutte cabinet repealed the Referendum Act passed in 2015, although that proposal was written in none of the coalition parties' election platforms. It stated the law had not delivered what was expected; results from the 2016 Ukraine–European Union Association Agreement referendum and 2018 Intelligence and Security Services Act referendum have been going against government proposals. The cabinet also deconstitutionalised the method of appointment of mayors and King's commissioners, thus allowing the method to be changed by law.

=== Finance ===
The cabinet plans to simplify income tax, reducing the number of tax brackets to two. Income below 68,600 would be taxed at 36.9% and income from 68,600 onward at 49.5%. There are also plans to increase the lower VAT rate from 6 to 9%. A plan to abolish dividend tax proved so controversial that it was discarded in October 2018. Instead, the cabinet will now lower corporation tax more than was initially planned; the higher rate will be lowered from 25 to 20.5%, and the lower rate from 20 to 15%.

=== Justice ===
In judicial matters, the cabinet intends to end the automatic conditional release of prisoners after two-thirds of their sentence and to shorten asylum permits from five to three years, after which refugees can request an extension of another two years.

=== Labour ===
The cabinet intends to reform the labour market and pension system. Laws around the termination of employment will be relaxed, while paid sick leave will be shortened. The cabinet initially planned to allow employers to pay handicapped people below the minimum wage, which would then be supplemented by local government. However, this proposal was later retracted.

=== Environment ===
The cabinet pledged to ban the sale of non-emission-free cars by 2030. There are also plans to introduce a flight tax by 2021. In March 2018, the cabinet also pledged to end gas extraction from the Groningen gas field within twelve years.

== Composition ==
Prime minister and deputy prime ministers in the third Rutte cabinet
Title	Minister			Term of office	
Title	Image	Name	Party	Start	End
Prime Minister	Mark Rutte	Mark Rutte	VVD	14 October 2010 (Note: Retained this position from the second Rutte cabinet.)	2 July 2024 (Note: Retained this position in the fourth Rutte cabinet.)
First Deputy Prime Minister	Hugo de Jonge	Hugo de Jonge	CDA	26 October 2017	10 January 2022
Second Deputy Prime Minister	Kajsa Ollongren	Kajsa Ollongren	D66	26 October 2017	1 November 2019 (Note: Kajsa Ollongren took an extended medical leave of absence from 1 November 2019.)
Second Deputy Prime Minister	Wouter Koolmees	Wouter Koolmees (acting)	D66	1 November 2019	14 May 2020
Second Deputy Prime Minister	Kajsa Ollongren	Kajsa Ollongren	D66	14 May 2020	10 January 2022
Third Deputy Prime Minister	Carola Schouten	Carola Schouten	CU	26 October 2017	2 July 2024

Ministers in the third Rutte cabinet
Title	Minister			Term of office	
Title	Image	Name	Party	Start	End
Minister of General Affairs	Mark Rutte	Mark Rutte	VVD	14 October 2010	2 July 2024
Minister of Health, Welfare and Sport	Hugo de Jonge	Hugo de Jonge	CDA	26 October 2017	10 January 2022
Minister of the Interior and Kingdom Relations	Kajsa Ollongren	Kajsa Ollongren	D66	26 October 2017	1 November 2019
Minister of the Interior and Kingdom Relations	Raymond Knops	Raymond Knops (acting)	CDA	1 November 2019	14 April 2020
Minister of the Interior and Kingdom Relations	Kajsa Ollongren	Kajsa Ollongren	D66	14 April 2020	10 January 2022
Minister of Agriculture, Nature and Food Quality	Carola Schouten	Carola Schouten	CU	26 October 2017	10 January 2022
Minister of Foreign Affairs	Halbe Zijlstra	Halbe Zijlstra	VVD	26 October 2017	13 February 2018 (Note: Resigned from this position.)
Minister of Foreign Affairs	Sigrid Kaag	Sigrid Kaag (ad interim)	D66	13 February 2018	7 March 2018
Minister of Foreign Affairs	Stef Blok	Stef Blok	VVD	7 March 2018	25 May 2021 (Note: Appointed as Minister of Economic Affairs and Climate Policy.)
Minister of Foreign Affairs	Sigrid Kaag	Sigrid Kaag	D66	25 May 2021	17 September 2021
Minister of Foreign Affairs	Tom de Bruijn	Tom de Bruijn (ad interim)	D66	17 September 2021	24 September 2021
Minister of Foreign Affairs	Ben Knapen	Ben Knapen	CDA	24 September 2021	10 January 2022
Minister of Justice and Security	Ferdinand Grapperhaus	Ferd Grapperhaus	CDA	26 October 2017	10 January 2022
Minister of Education, Culture and Science	Ingrid van Engelshoven	Ingrid van Engelshoven	D66	26 October 2017	10 January 2022
Minister of Finance	Wopke Hoekstra	Wopke Hoekstra	CDA	26 October 2017	10 January 2022
Minister of Defence	Ank Bijleveld	Ank Bijleveld	CDA	26 October 2017	17 September 2021
Minister of Defence	Ferdinand Grapperhaus	Ferd Grapperhaus (ad interim)	CDA	17 September 2021	24 September 2021
Minister of Defence	Henk Kamp	Henk Kamp	VVD	24 September 2021	10 January 2022
Minister of Infrastructure and Water Management	Cora van Nieuwenhuizen	Cora van Nieuwenhuizen	VVD	26 October 2017	31 August 2021
Minister of Infrastructure and Water Management	Barbara Visser	Barbara Visser	VVD	31 August 2021	10 January 2022
Minister of Economic Affairs and Climate Policy	Eric Wiebes	Eric Wiebes	VVD	26 October 2017	15 January 2021
Minister of Economic Affairs and Climate Policy	Cora van Nieuwenhuizen	Cora van Nieuwenhuizen (ad interim)	VVD	15 January 2021	20 January 2021
Minister of Economic Affairs and Climate Policy	Bas van 't Wout	Bas van 't Wout	VVD	20 January 2021	25 May 2021
Minister of Economic Affairs and Climate Policy	Stef Blok	Stef Blok	VVD	25 May 2021	10 January 2022
Minister of Social Affairs and Employment	Wouter Koolmees	Wouter Koolmees	D66	26 October 2017	10 January 2022

Ministers without portfolio in the third Rutte cabinet
Ministry	Portfolio	Minister			Term of office	
Ministry	Portfolio	Image	Name	Party	Start	End
Foreign Affairs	Foreign Trade and Development Cooperation	Sigrid Kaag	Sigrid Kaag	D66	26 October 2017	10 August 2021 (Note: Sigrid Kaag was appointed as Minister of Foreign Affairs on 25 May 2021, and was replaced as Minister for Foreign Trade and Development Cooperation by Tom de Bruijn on 10 August 2021.)
Foreign Affairs	Foreign Trade and Development Cooperation	Tom de Bruijn	Tom de Bruijn	D66	10 August 2021	10 January 2022
Justice and Security	Legal Protection	Sander Dekker	Sander Dekker	VVD	26 October 2017	10 January 2022
Education, Culture and Science	Primary and Secondary Education and Media	Arie Slob	Arie Slob	CU	26 October 2017	10 January 2022
Health, Welfare and Sport	Medical Care and Sport	Bruno Bruins	Bruno Bruins	VVD	26 October 2017	19 March 2020
Health, Welfare and Sport	Medical Care and Sport	Martin van Rijn	Martin van Rijn (ad interim)	Ind. (Note: While a member of the Labour Party, Martin van Rijn temporarily joined the cabinet as an independent politician.)	23 March 2020	9 July 2020
Health, Welfare and Sport	Medical Care and Sport	Tamara van Ark	Tamara van Ark	VVD	9 July 2020	3 September 2021
Interior and Kingdom Relations	General Intelligence and Security Service (Note: Temporary position during the extended medical leave of Kajsa Ollongren.)	Ank Bijleveld	Ank Bijleveld (acting)	CDA	1 November 2019	14 April 2020
Interior and Kingdom Relations	Environment and Housing	Stientje van Veldhoven	Stientje van Veldhoven (acting)	D66	1 November 2019	14 April 2020

State secretaries in the third Rutte cabinet
Ministry	Portfolio	State secretary			Term of office	
Ministry	Portfolio	Image	Name	Party	Start	End
Justice and Security	Asylum and Migration	Mark Harbers	Mark Harbers	VVD	26 October 2017	21 May 2019
Justice and Security	Asylum and Migration	Ankie Broekers-Knol	Ankie Broekers-Knol	VVD	11 July 2019	10 January 2022
Interior and Kingdom Relations	Kingdom Relations and the Central Government Sector	Raymond Knops	Raymond Knops	CDA	26 October 2017	1 November 2019 (Note: Appointed as acting Minister of the Interior and Kingdom Relations.)
Interior and Kingdom Relations	Kingdom Relations and the Central Government Sector	Raymond Knops	Raymond Knops	CDA	14 April 2020	10 January 2022
Finance	Tax Affairs and the Tax Administration	Menno Snel	Menno Snel	D66	26 October 2017	18 December 2019
Finance	Tax Affairs and the Tax Administration	Hans Vijlbrief	Hans Vijlbrief	D66	29 January 2020	10 January 2022
Finance	Benefits and Customs	Alexandra van Huffelen	Alexandra van Huffelen	D66	29 January 2020	10 January 2022
Defence	Arms Procurement and Personnel	Barbara Visser	Barbara Visser	VVD	26 October 2017	31 August 2021 (Note: Appointed as Minister of Infrastructure and Water Management.)
Infrastructure and Water Management	Environment and Public Transport	Stientje van Veldhoven	Stientje van Veldhoven	D66	26 October 2017	1 November 2019 (Note: Appointed as acting Minister for the Environment and Housing.)
Infrastructure and Water Management	Environment and Public Transport	Stientje van Veldhoven	Stientje van Veldhoven	D66	14 April 2020	19 July 2021
Infrastructure and Water Management	Environment and Public Transport	Steven van Weyenberg	Steven van Weyenberg	D66	10 August 2021	10 January 2022
Economic Affairs and Climate Policy	Enterprise and Consumer Affairs	Mona Keijzer	Mona Keijzer	CDA	26 October 2017	25 September 2021 (Note: Dismissed by the Prime Minister.)
Economic Affairs and Climate Policy	Climate and Energy Policy	Dilan Yeşilgöz-Zegerius	Dilan Yeşilgöz	VVD	25 May 2021	10 January 2022
Social Affairs and Employment	Poverty Policy and Participation	Tamara van Ark	Tamara van Ark	VVD	26 October 2017	9 July 2020 (Note: Appointed as Minister for Medical Care and Sport.)
Social Affairs and Employment	Poverty Policy and Participation	Bas van 't Wout	Bas van 't Wout	VVD	9 July 2020	20 January 2021 (Note: Appointed as Minister of Economic Affairs and Climate Policy.)
Social Affairs and Employment	Poverty Policy and Participation	Dennis Wiersma	Dennis Wiersma	VVD	10 August 2021	10 January 2022
Health, Welfare and Sport	Youth and Prevention	Paul Blokhuis	Paul Blokhuis	CU	26 October 2017	10 January 2022
