= Bas van 't Wout =

Dutch politician (born 1979)

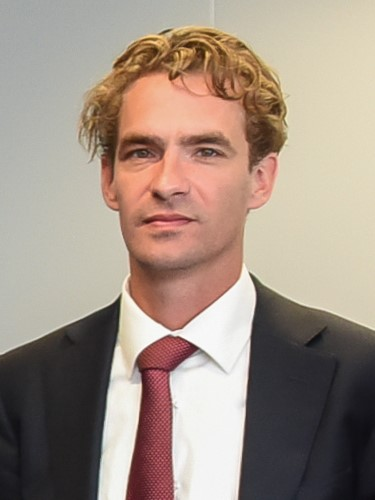
- Van 't Wout in 2015

Minister of Economic Affairs and Climate Policy
- In office 20 January 2021 – 24 May 2021
- Prime Minister: Mark Rutte
- Preceded by: Cora van Nieuwenhuizen (Acting)
- Succeeded by: Stef Blok

State Secretary for Social Affairs and Employment
- In office 9 July 2020 – 20 January 2021
- Prime Minister: Mark Rutte
- Preceded by: Tamara van Ark
- Succeeded by: Position abolished

Member of the House of Representatives
- In office 20 September 2012 – 2 July 2020

Personal details
- Born: Bastiaan van 't Wout; 22 April 1979 (age 47) Amersfoort, Netherlands
- Party: People's Party for Freedom and Democracy
- Education: Vrije Universiteit Amsterdam
- Occupation: Politician

Bastiaan "Bas" van 't Wout (born 22 April 1979) is a Dutch retired politician who served as Minister of Economic Affairs and Climate Policy in 2021 in the Third Rutte cabinet. A member of the People's Party for Freedom and Democracy (VVD), he was previously elected to the House of Representatives from 2012 to 2020, before he held the position of State Secretary for Social Affairs and Employment from 2020 until 2021.

== Early career ==
A native of Amersfoort, Van 't Wout worked as a political assistant to the State Secretary for Education, Culture and Science and chairman of the VVD party in the House of Representatives Mark Rutte from 2005 to 2007.

== Political career ==
=== Career in local politics ===
Van 't Wout became a municipal councillor of Amsterdam following the 2006 election.

=== Member of the Dutch Parliament, 2012–2020 ===
Van 't Wout served as a member of the House of Representatives from September 20, 2012, to 2 July 2020. In the 2012 parliamentary elections, he was in 27th place, and was elected lower. He received 1,178 preferential votes. In the 2017 House of Representatives elections, he was in 13th place and was elected again. Until 26 October 2017, he was spokesperson for Long-term care, Social Support Act and Social Affairs and Employment. From 26 October 2017 he was vice-chairman of the VVD and spokesperson for the Ministry of General Affairs.

In addition to his work in parliament, Van 't Wout was a member of the Dutch delegation to the Parliamentary Assembly of the Council of Europe from 2015 until 2016.

In July 2020 Tamara van Ark was promoted from State Secretary of Social Affairs and Employment to Minister for Medical Care. Van 't Wout replaced her as State Secretary.

=== Minister of Economic Affairs, 2021 ===
After the departure of Eric Wiebes, Van 't Wout was appointed as his successor as Minister of Economic Affairs and Climate Policy as of 20 January 2021 in the demissionary third cabinet of Prime Minister Rutte. He was in 6th place on the VVD candidate list for the 2021 elections. On 31 March 2021, he was sworn in again as a member of parliament.

On 24 May 2021 it was reported that Van't Wout was suffering from a occupational burnout and would not be returning to the parliament for at least 3 months; fellow cabinet ministers Stef Blok and Sigrid Kaag took over and shared the economic affairs portfolio in his absence.

== Electoral history ==
Electoral history of BAs van 't Wout
Year	Body	Party	Pos.	Votes	Result		Ref.
Year	Body	Party	Pos.	Votes	Party seats	Individual	Ref.
2021	House of Representatives	People's Party for Freedom and Democracy	6	4,074	34	Won	
