= Betrouwbare Bronnen =

Betrouwbare Bronnen (English: Reliable Sources) is a podcast about political history made by journalist Jaap Jansen with historian Pieter Gerrit "PG" Kroeger as a very frequent guest. The podcast is financed using voluntary donations and an annual 25,000 euro subsidy from the European Commission. Various national Dutch politicians are known to listen to the podcast, including Wouter Koolmees.
