= Tamara van Ark =

Dutch politician (born 1974)

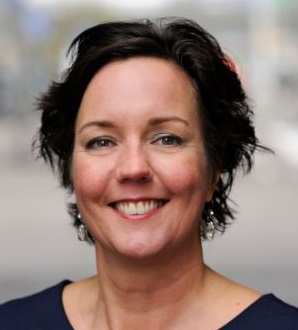
- Van Ark in 2018

Minister of Health
- In office 9 July 2020 – 3 September 2021
- Prime Minister: Mark Rutte
- Preceded by: Martin van Rijn
- Succeeded by: Conny Helder

State Secretary for Social Affairs and Employment
- In office 26 October 2017 – 9 July 2020
- Prime Minister: Mark Rutte
- Preceded by: Jetta Klijnsma
- Succeeded by: Bas van 't Wout

Member of the House of Representatives
- In office 31 March 2021 – 3 September 2021
- In office 17 June 2010 – 26 October 2017

Personal details
- Born: 11 August 1974 (age 52) The Hague, Netherlands
- Party: People's Party for Freedom and Democracy
- Spouse: Elbert Dijkgraaf (m. 2021)
- Children: 2
- Education: Erasmus University Rotterdam (Bachelor of Public Administration, Master of Public Administration)
- Occupation: Politician · Civil servant · Management consultant · Social worker

Tamara van Ark (born 11 August 1974) is a Dutch politician of the People's Party for Freedom and Democracy (VVD). She served as Minister of Health from 9 July 2020 until 3 September 2021 and as State Secretary for Social Affairs and Employment from 26 October 2017 until 9 July 2020 in the Cabinet Rutte III.

== Early life and education ==
Van Ark received a propaedeutic diploma from the Rotterdam Hogeschool voor Economische Studies (now named the Rotterdam Business School) of the Rotterdam University of Applied Sciences in 1994. She went subsequently to the Erasmus University Rotterdam where she obtained an MSc degree in Public Administration in 1998.

== Political career ==
=== Career in local politics ===
As a member of the People's Party for Freedom and Democracy, Van Ark was an alderwoman of the former municipality of Nieuwerkerk aan den IJssel from 2004 to 2010 and of its successor, the Zuidplas municipality, in 2010.

=== Career in national politics ===
In the 2010 Dutch general election, Van Ark was elected to the House of Representatives (or Second Chamber). As a parliamentarian from 17 June 2010, she focused on matters of long-term care. She was also involved, with other officeholders, with a law proposal against labour discrimination of homosexuals.

Van Ark was reelected to the House of Representatives in 2012 and 2017. She remained a member of the House of Representatives until her appointment as State Secretary on 26 October 2017.

=== Minister of Health, 2020–2021 ===
On 9 July 2020, Van Ark succeeded Martin van Rijn as Minister of Health. From 2020, she was also for a time a member of the Global Leaders Group on Antimicrobial Resistance; at the time she joined it this was co-chaired by Sheikh Hasina and Mia Mottley.

Following the 2021 general election, Van Ark and Wouter Koolmees of the Democrats 66 party were chosen to lead their parties' negotiations on a coalition agreement.

Van Ark's resignation as Minister of Health, described as being on grounds of health, was accepted by King Willem-Alexander on 3 September 2021.

== Electoral history ==
Electoral history of Tamara van Ark
Year	Body	Party	Pos.	Votes	Result		Ref.
Year	Body	Party	Pos.	Votes	Party seats	Individual	Ref.
2021	House of Representatives	People's Party for Freedom and Democracy	2	73,125	34	Won	

Political offices
Preceded by Jetta Klijnsma	State Secretary for Social Affairs and Employment; 2017–2020	Succeeded by Bas van 't Wout
Preceded by Martin van Rijn	Minister of Health; 2020–2021	Succeeded by Vacant
