= Cora van Nieuwenhuizen =

Dutch politician (born 1963)

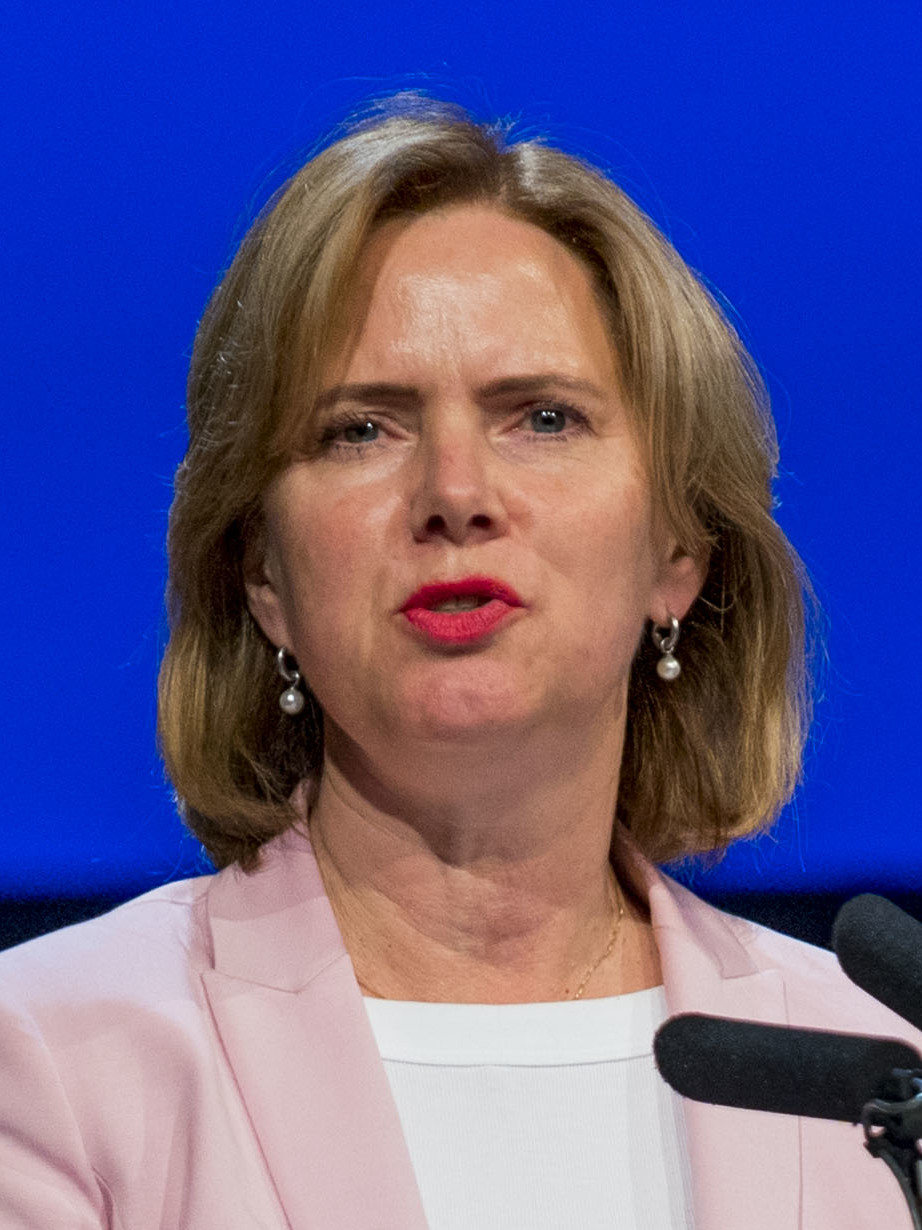
- Van Nieuwenhuizen in 2019

Minister of Infrastructure and Water Management
- In office 26 October 2017 – 31 August 2021
- Prime Minister: Mark Rutte
- Preceded by: Melanie Schultz van Haegen (as Minister of Infrastructure and the Environment)
- Succeeded by: Barbara Visser

Minister of Economic Affairs and Climate Policy
- Ad interim
- In office 15 January 2021 – 20 January 2021
- Prime Minister: Mark Rutte
- Preceded by: Eric Wiebes
- Succeeded by: Bas van 't Wout

Member of the European Parliament
- In office 1 July 2014 – 26 October 2017
- Constituency: Netherlands

Member of the House of Representatives
- In office 17 June 2010 – 1 July 2014

Personal details
- Born: 12 June 1963 (age 63) Ridderkerk, Netherlands
- Party: People's Party for Freedom and Democracy
- Spouse: Bert Wijbenga
- Children: 4 children
- Education: Utrecht University (Bachelor of Social Science, Master of Social Science); Nyenrode Business University (Bachelor of Business Administration); Tilburg University (Bachelor of Business Management)
- Occupation: Politician; accountant; social geographer
- Website: Minister of Infrastructure and Water Management

Cornelia "Cora" van Nieuwenhuizen-Wijbenga (Dutch pronunciation: [ˈkoːraː vɑ ˈniu.ə(n)ˌɦœyzə(ɱ) ˈʋɛibə(ŋ)ɣaː]; née van Nieuwenhuizen; born 12 June 1963) is a Dutch politician of the People's Party for Freedom and Democracy (VVD). She served as Minister of Infrastructure and Water Management in the Third Rutte cabinet from 2017 to 2021, and briefly as Minister of Economic Affairs and Climate Policy (ad interim) in 2021.

== Education ==
Van Nieuwenhuizen studied social geography at Utrecht University, as well as at Nyenrode Business University in Breukelen and at TIAS School for Business and Society in Tilburg.

== Political career ==
=== Early career in local politics ===
Van Nieuwenhuizen was a member of the municipal council of Oisterwijk from 1994 to 2006 as well as party group leader from 2002 to 2003. She was also a member and party group leader in the States-Provincial of North Brabant from 2003 to 2007 and a member of the States Deputed of North Brabant from 2007 to 2010, in charge of mobility and infrastructure.

=== Member of the House of Representatives, 2010–2014 ===
Elected to the House of Representatives in the 2010 election, she was reelected in 2012. In Parliament, she presided over the Finance Committee.

=== Member of the European Parliament, 2014–2017 ===
Van Nieuwenhuizen was elected a Member of the European Parliament in the 2014 election. In the House of Representatives she was succeeded by Jeroen van Wijngaarden. A member of the ALDE (Group of the Alliance of Liberals and Democrats for Europe) political faction, she served as her parliamentary group's deputy coordinator on the Committee on Economic and Monetary Affairs (alongside Sylvie Goulard). On the committee, she was the rapporteur on financial technology. Later, she joined the Special Committee on Tax Rulings and Other Measures Similar in Nature or Effect in 2015. In addition, she held the position of vice-chairwoman of the parliament's delegation for relations with India.

Besides her committee assignments, Van Nieuwenhuizen was a member of the European Parliament Intergroup on Long Term Investment and Reindustrialisation and the European Parliament Intergroup on LGBT Rights.

Van Nieuwenhuizen mainly focused on matters of aviation, water transport and energy policy. She served as an MEP until her appointment to the Government of the Netherlands.

=== Minister of Infrastructure and Water Management, 2017–2021 ===
From 26 October 2017, Van Nieuwenhuizen served as Minister of Infrastructure and Water Management in the third cabinet of Prime Minister Mark Rutte. One of the main policy debates during her tenure revolved around the opening of Lelystad Airport to commercial traffic.

After the fall of the Third Rutte cabinet and consequently the resignation of Eric Wiebes, Van Nieuwenhuizen became ad interim Minister of Economic Affairs and Climate Policy on 15 January 2021 as well, until then-State Secretary Bas van 't Wout was selected as his replacement on 20 January 2021.

== Later career ==
In 2021, Van Nieuwenhuizen resigned from the government to become chair of Energie-Nederland, the lobbying organization for the country's energy sector.

== Other activities ==
- Brabant Intermodal, chairwoman of the Advisory Board
- Hans Nord Foundation, Member of the Board

Political offices
Preceded by Melanie Schultz van Haegen as Minister of Infrastructure and the Environment	Minister of Infrastructure and Water Management; 2017–2021	Succeeded by Barbara Visser
Preceded by Eric Wiebes	Minister of Economic Affairs and Climate Policy; Ad interim 2021	Succeeded by Bas van 't Wout
