= Health Council of the Netherlands =

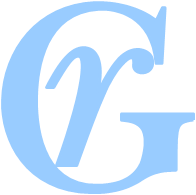
Logo of the Health Council

The Health Council of the Netherlands or the Dutch Health Council (Dutch: Gezondheidsraad) is an independent Dutch scientific advisory body with the task of advising the government and parliament about matters in the areas of public health and medical research.

== History ==
The Council's history goes back to 1902. That year, the Central Health Council (Centrale Gezondheidsraad) was formed based on the first Health Act (Gezondheidswet) of 1901. The first Health Act also provided that an institute be set up that carried out inspections, the Public Health Supervisory Service (Staatstoezicht op de Volksgezondheid), nowadays known as the Dutch Health Care Inspectorate (Inspectie voor de Gezondheidszorg, IGZ). The Central Health Council was to lead this service. This Council, consisting of the main inspectors of the Supervisory Service and private experts, was also tasked to advise the government.

In subsequent years, the double task – governing and advising – caused problems. The Central Health Council advised adequately, but failed as a governing body. In 1919, the second Health Act changed the situation: the government itself took over the Supervisory Service, and the Central Health Council would henceforth only give advice. From that moment on, it consisted of scientists and representatives of societal and professional organisations. The name was shortened to Health Council (Gezondheidsraad). Recommendations to the government could concern both societal and scientific matters.

== Dutch dietary guidelines ==
The Health Council of the Netherlands's Dutch Dietary Guidelines 2015 moved in the direction of a more plant-based diet and less animal-based dietary pattern to improve health with reduced processed sugar intake.
