= Wilma Mansveld =

Dutch politician

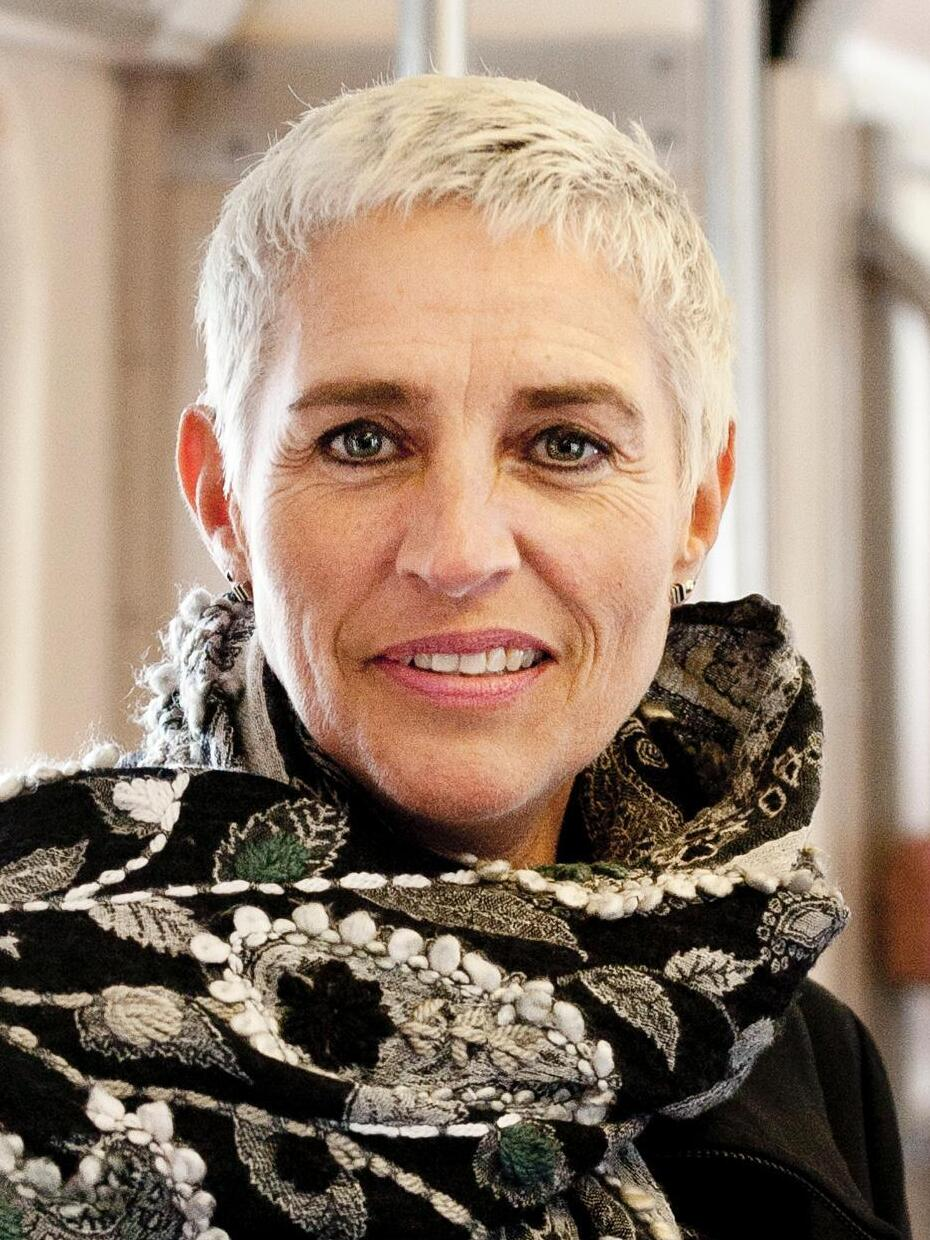
- Wilma Mansveld in 2013

State secretary for the Environment
- In office 5 November 2012 – 28 October 2015
- Prime Minister: Mark Rutte
- Preceded by: Joop Atsma
- Succeeded by: Sharon Dijksma

Personal details
- Born: Wilma Jacqueline Mansveld; 11 September 1962 (age 64) Hilversum, Netherlands
- Party: Labour Party
- Children: 1 daughter
- Education: University of Winnipeg (Bachelor of Management Studies)
- Occupation: Politician; Manager; Accountant

Wilma Jacqueline Mansveld (born 11 September 1962) is a Dutch politician of the Labour Party (PvdA). She served as Undersecretary for Infrastructure and Environment, dealing with water policy, environment and aviation in the Second Rutte cabinet from 5 November 2012 until 28 October 2015. Before that she was a member of the States of Groningen from 2007 to 2011 and afterwards a member of the Provincial-Executive of the same province from 2011 to 2012. Mansveld worked as an accountant for Jaguar Cars Netherlands and was secretary of the Social-Economic Council North Netherlands from 2001 to 2011.

Political offices
| Preceded by Joop Atsma | Minister for the Environment; 2012–2015 | Succeeded by Sharon Dijksma |
