= Ingrid van Engelshoven =

Dutch politician

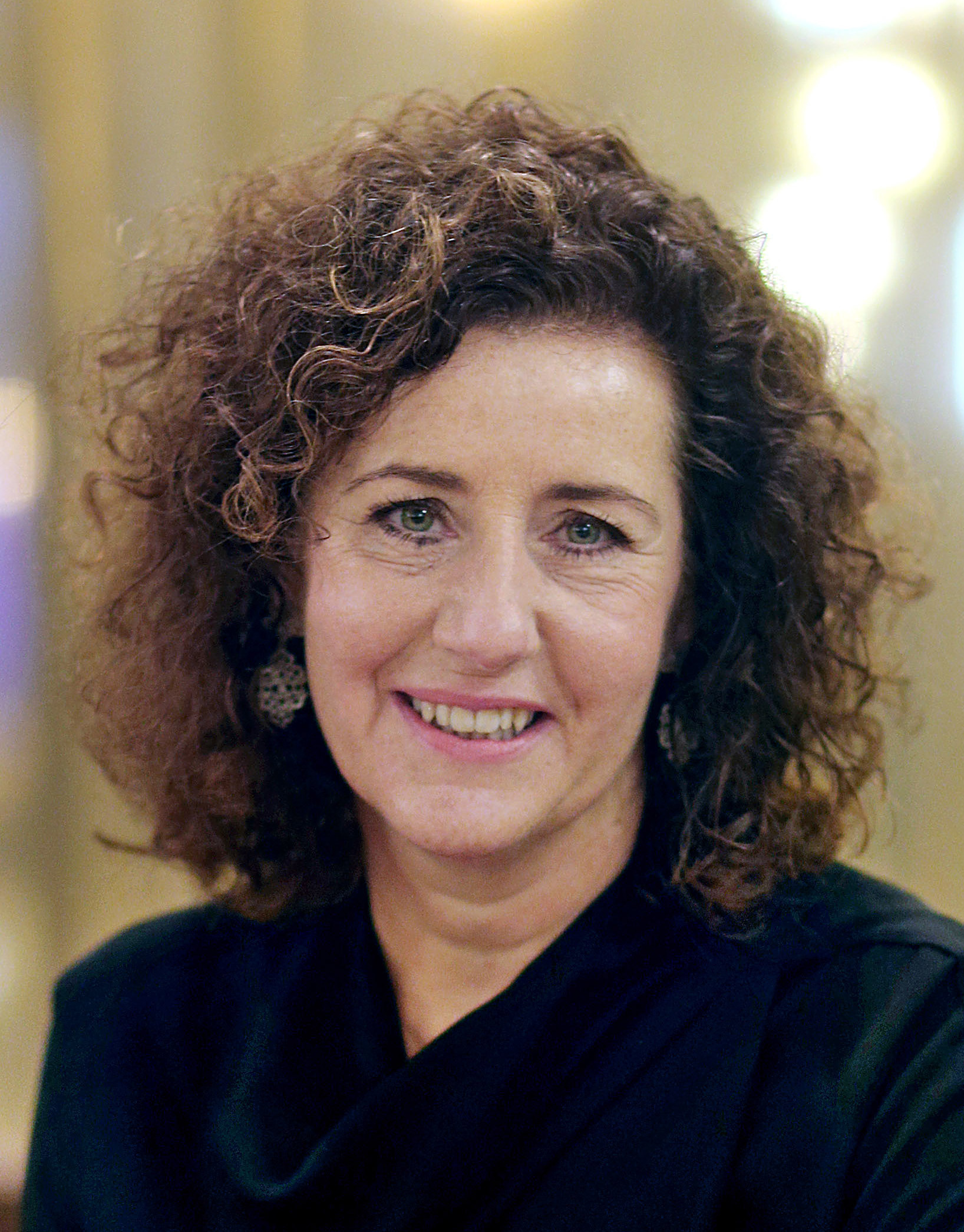
- Van Engelshoven in 2017

Minister of Education, Culture and Science
- In office 26 October 2017 – 10 January 2022
- Prime Minister: Mark Rutte
- Preceded by: Jet Bussemaker
- Succeeded by: Robbert Dijkgraaf

Member of the House of Representatives
- In office 23 March 2017 – 26 October 2017

Chairwoman of the Democrats 66
- In office 12 May 2007 – 9 March 2013
- Leader: Alexander Pechtold
- Preceded by: Gerard Schouw (ad interim)
- Succeeded by: Fleur Gräper

Personal details
- Born: Ingrid Katharina van Engelshoven; 12 July 1966 (age 60) Delfzijl, Netherlands
- Party: Democrats 66 (since 1986)
- Children: 1 daughter
- Education: Radboud University Nijmegen (Bachelor of Social Science, Master of Social Science); Leiden University (Bachelor of Laws, Master of Laws)
- Occupation: Politician · Civil servant · Jurist · Management consultant · Political consultant

Ingrid Katharina van Engelshoven (born 12 July 1966) is a Dutch politician who served as Minister of Education, Culture and Science in the Third Rutte cabinet from 26 October 2017 until 10 January 2022.

A member of Democrats 66 (D66) party, she was the party chairwoman from 12 May 2007 until 9 March 2013; before her election to the House of Representatives in 2017, she had been an alderwoman in The Hague, from 26 June 2014 to 16 February 2017. Van Engelshoven studied political science at Radboud University Nijmegen and law at Leiden University. On 26 October 2017, she was appointed as Minister for Education, Culture and Science in Mark Rutte's third cabinet, the first member of her party to hold the position.

== Feminism ==
According to Van Engelshoven, there are too many "white men" working at colleges and universities in the Netherlands. She has claimed that this leads to "nasty incidents involving intimidation of female employees". She has qualified the decision of the TU Eindhoven to no longer accept men for new vacancies as "courageous". The Dutch Institute for Human Rights later ruled that this decision violates Dutch equality laws.

Party political offices
Preceded by Gerard Schouw; Ad interim	Chairwoman of the Democrats 66; 2007–2013	Succeeded by Fleur Gräper
Political offices
Preceded by Jet Bussemaker	Minister of Education, Culture and Science; 2017–2022	Succeeded by Robbert Dijkgraaf
