= Bruno Bruins =

Dutch politician (born 1963)

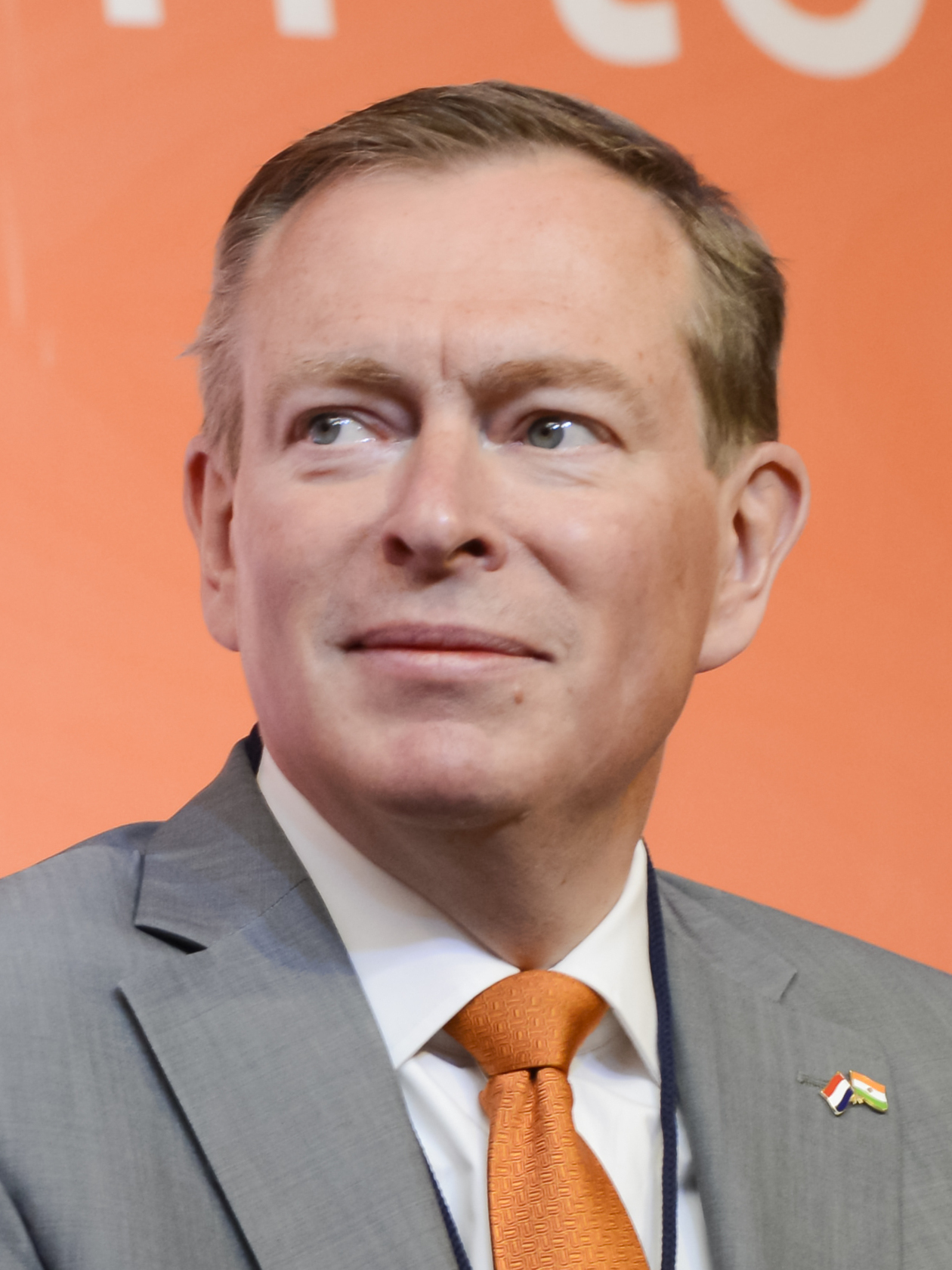
- Bruins in 2018

Minister for Medical Care
- In office 26 October 2017 – 19 March 2020
- Prime Minister: Mark Rutte
- Preceded by: Office established
- Succeeded by: Martin van Rijn

State Secretary for Education, Culture and Science
- In office 29 June 2006 – 22 February 2007 Serving with Medy van der Laan (2006)
- Prime Minister: Jan Peter Balkenende
- Preceded by: Mark Rutte
- Succeeded by: Marja van Bijsterveldt; Sharon Dijksma

Mayor of Leidschendam-Voorburg
- In office 22 February 2007 – 1 November 2007; Acting
- Preceded by: Michiel van Haersma Buma
- Succeeded by: Hans van der Sluijs

Personal details
- Born: Bruno Johannes Bruins; 10 July 1963 (age 63) Arnhem, Netherlands
- Party: People's Party for Freedom and Democracy
- Children: 3
- Education: University of Groningen (Bachelor of Public Administration, Bachelor of Laws, Master of Public Administration, Master of Laws)
- Occupation: Politician · Civil servant · Businessman · Corporate director · Nonprofit director
- Website: Minister for Medical Care

Bruno Johannes Bruins (born 10 July 1963) is a Dutch politician of the People's Party for Freedom and Democracy (VVD) who served as Minister for Medical Care in the Third Rutte cabinet from 26 October 2017 to 19 March 2020, when he resigned. He previously served as State Secretary for Education, Culture and Science from 29 June 2006 until 22 February 2007 in the Second and Third Balkenende cabinets.

Bruins also served as Acting Mayor of Leidschendam-Voorburg from 22 February 2007 until 1 November 2007. He worked as a Corporate director for the public transport company Connexxion from 1 September 2008 until 1 August 2011 and was Chairman of the Employee Insurance association from 1 January 2012 until 26 October 2017.

After the general election of 2017, Bruins was appointed as Minister for Medical Care in the Third Rutte cabinet. During his time in office, he led the initial phase of the Dutch government's fight against the COVID-19 pandemic. He resigned in March 2020 after collapsing from exhaustion during a parliamentary debate on the pandemic.

In 2020, Bruins was appointed acting managing director of HTM Personenvervoer.

== Decorations ==
Honours
Ribbon bar	Honour	Country	Date
	Knight of the Order of Orange-Nassau	Netherlands	11 April 2007

Political offices
Preceded by Mark Rutte	State Secretary for Education, Culture and Science; 2006–2007; Served alongside: Medy van der Laan (2006)	Succeeded by Marja van Bijsterveldt; Sharon Dijksma
Preceded by Michiel van Haersma Buma	Mayor of Leidschendam-Voorburg; Ad interim 2007	Succeeded by Hans van der Sluijs
New office	Minister for Medical Care; 2017–2020	Succeeded by Martin van Rijn
Business positions
Preceded by Joop Linthorst	Chairman of the Employee Insurance association 2012–2017	Succeeded by Fred Paling
