= Health and Youth Care Inspectorate =

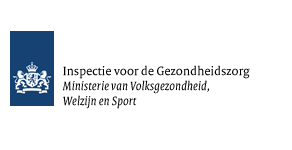
IGZ logo

The Health and Youth Care Inspectorate (Dutch: Inspectie Gezondheidszorg en Jeugd, IGJ) is a governmental institution that supervises public health in the Netherlands. It is part of the Ministry of Health, Welfare and Sport, located in Utrecht. The IGJ supervises the quality, safety and accessibility of health care, and guards the rights of patients.

== History ==
At the time of the Dutch Republic (1581–1795), public health and health care were the domain of the provincial and urban authorities. From the establishment of the Batavian Republic in 1795 onwards, this responsibility was taken up by the national government. In the first half of the 19th century, governmental supervision of health care originated.

In 1902, the Public Health Supervisory Service was set up by the Health Act, falling under the jurisdiction of the Central Health Council. In 1919, Supervisory Service was put under the administration of the government itself.

In 1995, the Medical Inspection for Public Health, the Medical Inspection for Public Mental Health and the Inspection for Medicines were merged into the IGZ. The State, provincial and metropolitan inspectors, who were tasked with supervising retirement homes, were added to the IGZ in 1997. The four departments of this merged organisation were fully integrated into the IGZ in subsequent years to make it more effective.

In 2018 the present-day IGJ was formed from a merger of the IGZ and the former Youth Care Inspectorate (Dutch: Inspectie Jeugdzorg, IJZ).

== See also ==
- Flemish Care Inspectorate
