= Barbara Visser =

Croatian-Dutch politician (born 1977)

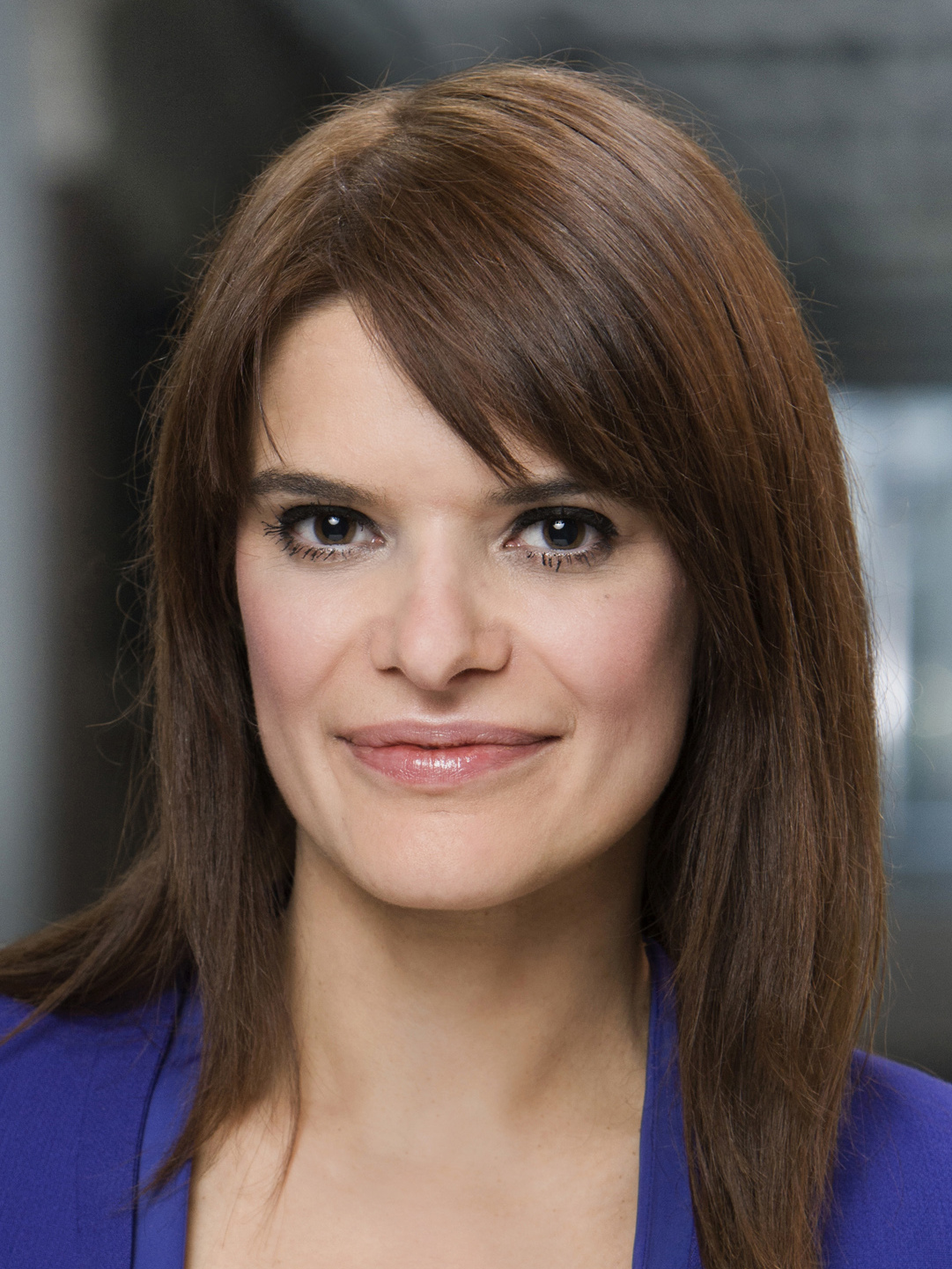
- Visser in 2012

Minister of Infrastructure and Water Management
- In office 31 August 2021 – 10 January 2022
- Prime Minister: Mark Rutte
- Preceded by: Cora van Nieuwenhuizen
- Succeeded by: Mark Harbers

State Secretary for Defence
- In office 26 October 2017 – 31 August 2021
- Prime Minister: Mark Rutte
- Preceded by: Jack de Vries
- Succeeded by: Christophe van der Maat (2022)

Member of the House of Representatives
- In office 20 September 2012 – 26 October 2017

Alderman of Zaanstad
- In office 27 April 2010 – 20 September 2012

Personal details
- Born: Barbara Visser; 16 August 1977 (age 49) Šibenik, SR Croatia, SFR Yugoslavia
- Citizenship: Kingdom of the Netherlands; Republic of Croatia
- Party: People's Party for Freedom and Democracy
- Education: Free University Amsterdam (BBA, MBA)
- Occupation: Politician; Civil servant; Management consultant

Barbara Visser (born 16 August 1977) is a Dutch-Croatian politician of the People's Party for Freedom and Democracy (VVD). From 31 August 2021 to 10 January 2022, she served as Minister of Infrastructure and Water Management of the Netherlands in the third Rutte cabinet. She previously served as State Secretary for Defence from 26 October 2017 to 31 August 2021.

== Career ==
Visser began her political career in 2006 as a member of the municipal council of Zaanstad. In 2010, she vacated her seat to become an alderman. Her portfolio included economic affairs, tourism, employment and social integration.

She was elected into the Dutch House of Representatives in the 2012 general election. Visser left the House of Representatives on 26 October 2017, when she was appointed State Secretary for Defence in the third Rutte cabinet.

== Personal life ==
Visser was born in Šibenik in the Socialist Federal Republic of Yugoslavia (present-day Croatia) into a mixed Croatian-Dutch family. She currently lives in Zaandam, North Holland.

Political offices
Preceded by Jack de Vries	State Secretary for Defence; 2017–2021	Succeeded by Christophe van der Maat
Preceded by Cora van Nieuwenhuizen	Minister of Infrastructure and Water Management; 2021–2022	Succeeded by Mark Harbers
