= Maarten van Ooijen =

Dutch politician (born 1990)

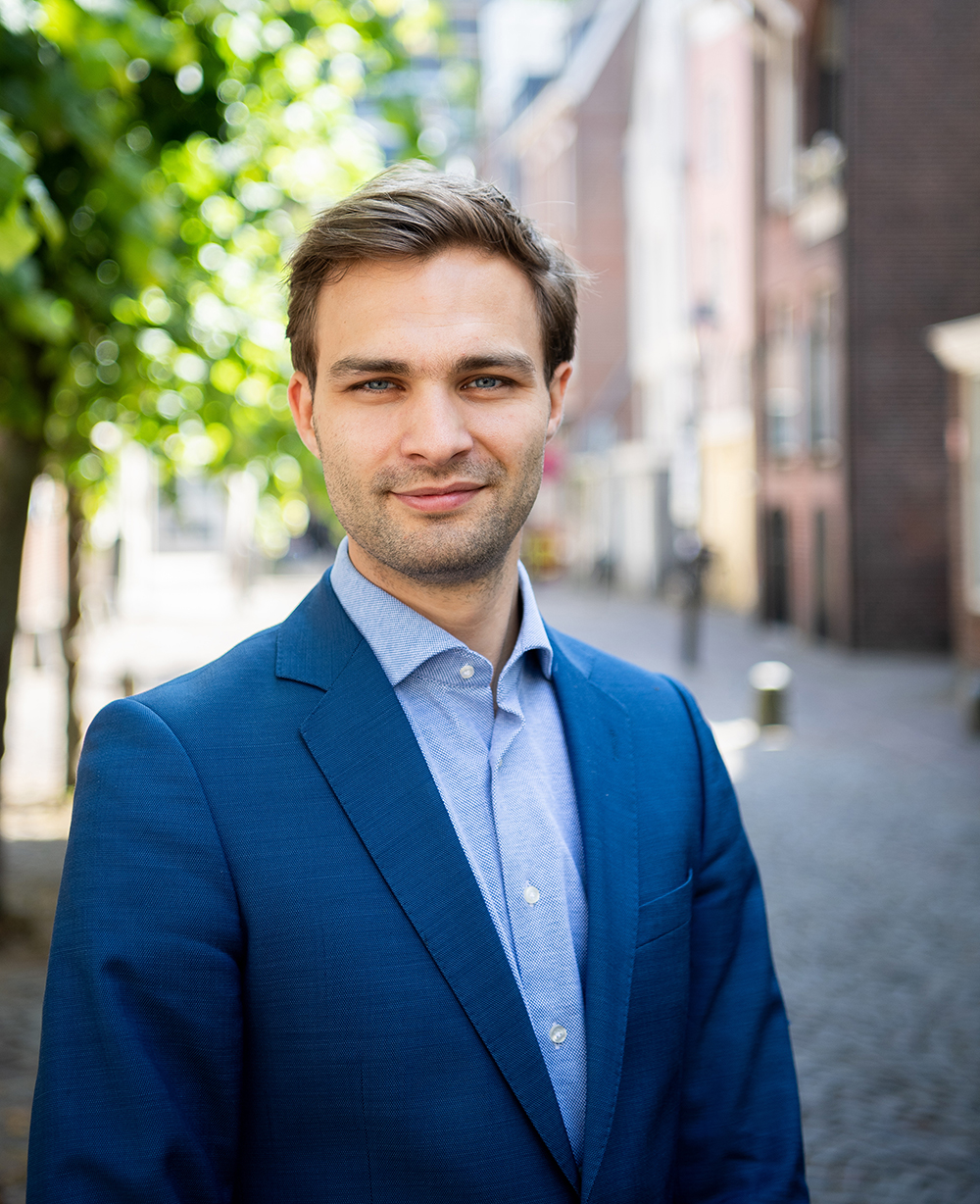
Van Ooijen in 2019

Maarten van Ooijen (born 1 May 1990) is a Dutch politician of the Christian Union (CU).

He was an alderman in the municipal executive of Utrecht between 7 June 2018 and 10 January 2022, when he became State Secretary for Health, Welfare and Sport in the fourth Rutte cabinet, a position he held until 2 July 2024, when the Schoof cabinet took office. Van Ooijen became chair of the advisory board of the Association of Primary Schools in the Netherlands in November 2024.
