= Rotterdam Business School =

Coordinates: 51.91570296735477°N 4.5275587719950074°E

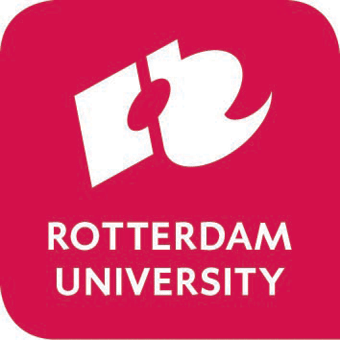
- Established: 1966
- Dean: Fred Feuerstake
- Location: Kralingse Zoom 91, Rotterdam, 3063 ND, The Netherlands, Rotterdam, The Netherlands
- Website: http://www.rotterdambusinessschool.nl

Rotterdam Business School (RBS; distinct from Rotterdam School of Management, Erasmus University) was founded in Rotterdam, Netherlands in 1990 as the International School of Economics Rotterdam, which developed study programmes in English. Rotterdam Business School is part of Rotterdam University of Applied Sciences and offers three types of study programmes: Bachelor, Master, and Special.
