= Wouter Koolmees =

Dutch economist and business executive

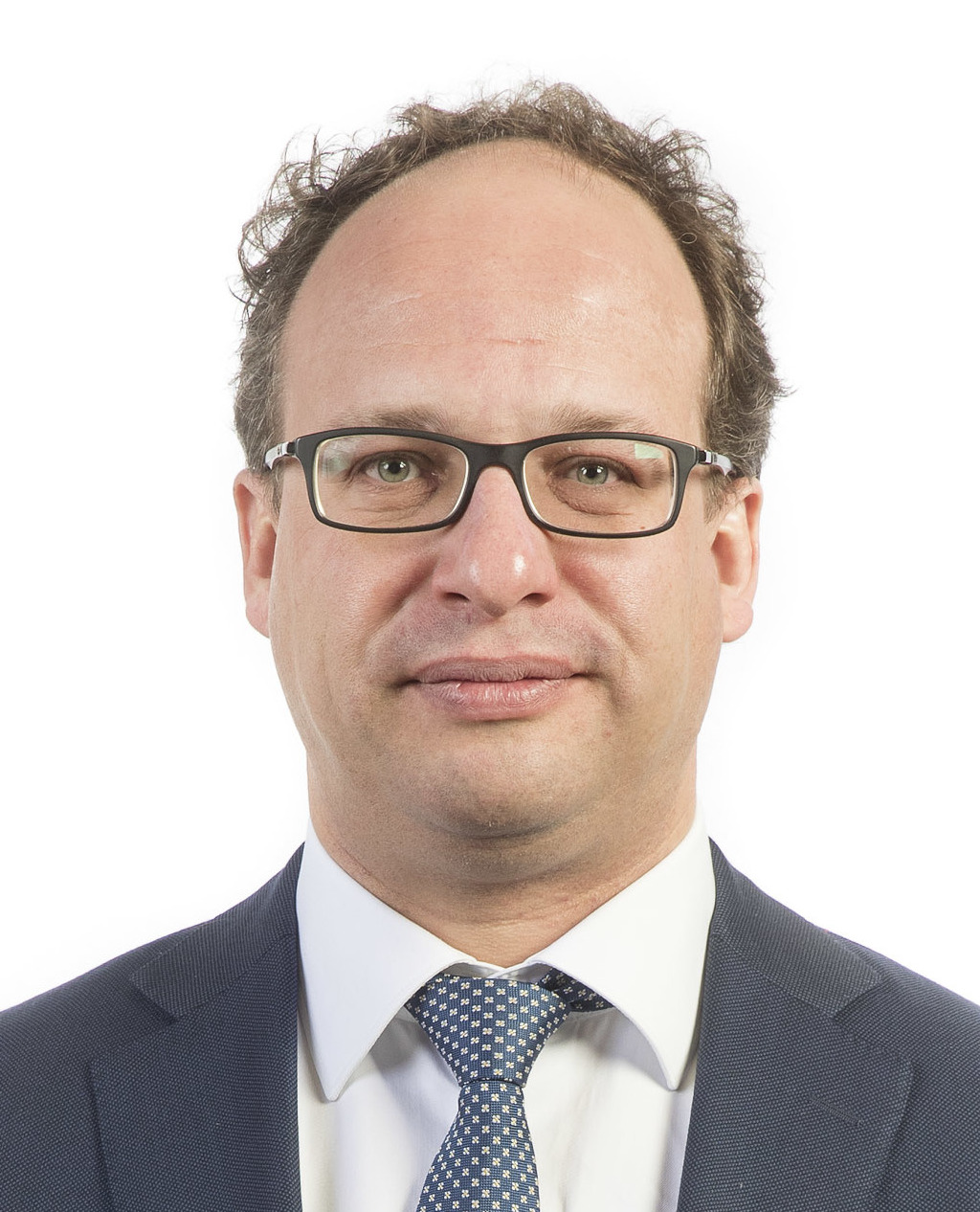

Minister of Social Affairs and Employment
- In office 26 October 2017 – 10 January 2022
- Prime Minister: Mark Rutte
- Preceded by: Lodewijk Asscher
- Succeeded by: Karien van Gennip

Deputy Prime Minister of the Netherlands (acting)
- In office 1 November 2019 – 14 May 2020
- Prime Minister: Mark Rutte

Member of the House of Representatives
- In office 17 June 2010 – 26 October 2017

Personal details
- Born: March 20, 1977 (age 49) Capelle aan den IJssel, Netherlands
- Party: Democrats 66 (D66)
- Education: Utrecht University

Wouter Koolmees (born 20 March 1977) is a Dutch economist, politician and business executive of the Democrats 66 (D66) party. He served as Minister of Social Affairs and Employment in the Third Rutte cabinet from 2017 to 2022, and briefly as acting Deputy Prime Minister of the Netherlands in 2019–2020. Since 1 November 2022, he has served as president and CEO of Nederlandse Spoorwegen (NS), the principal Dutch national railway operator.

== Early life and education ==
Koolmees was born on 20 March 1977 in Capelle aan den IJssel, in the province of South Holland. He studied economics at Utrecht University, graduating with a doctorandus (drs.) degree, equivalent to a master's degree.

== Career ==
=== Ministry of Finance (2003–2010) ===
After graduating, Koolmees joined the Ministry of Finance as a civil servant in July 2003, initially working on general financial and economic policy. From January 2007 he transferred to the Inspectorate of Public Finance, and from January 2009 served as head of budget policy within the Directorate-General of the National Budget, until June 2010.

=== Member of Parliament (2010–2017) ===
Koolmees was elected to the House of Representatives for D66 on 17 June 2010. He served as the party's financial spokesperson and as vice-parliamentary leader. As a parliamentarian he focused primarily on finance, budget policy, transport and water supply. He was also a member of the parliamentary inquiry commission on fiscal constructions.

Following the 2017 Dutch general election, Koolmees represented D66 alongside party leader Alexander Pechtold during coalition negotiations that resulted in the Third Rutte cabinet.

=== Minister of Social Affairs and Employment (2017–2022) ===
Koolmees was appointed Minister of Social Affairs and Employment on 26 October 2017 in the Third Rutte cabinet. His most significant achievement as minister was brokering a landmark pension reform agreement with social partners in June 2019, after years of negotiations. The agreement made the Dutch pension system more personal and transparent, introduced a partial link between economic conditions and pension payouts, and slowed the rise of the state pension age.

He also introduced the Wet inburgering 2021 (Civic Integration Act 2021), under which municipalities became responsible for supervising and supporting the integration of newcomers, and introduced paid parental leave legislation implementing an EU directive.

From 1 November 2019 to 14 May 2020, Koolmees served as acting Deputy Prime Minister, filling in for Kajsa Ollongren during her absence due to illness.

=== Cabinet formation roles (2021 and 2025) ===
In March 2021, together with Tamara van Ark (VVD), Koolmees was appointed as scout (verkenner) by the House of Representatives to explore possibilities for a new coalition following the 2021 Dutch general election. From 5 October 2021, he served as informateur alongside Johan Remkes (VVD), tasked with forming a cabinet of VVD, D66, CDA and ChristenUnie. They presented their final report and a coalition agreement on 15 December 2021, forming the basis for the Fourth Rutte cabinet.

Following the 2025 Dutch general election, Koolmees was appointed as scout on 4 November 2025, nominated by D66 as the largest party. On 11 November 2025 he presented his final report, recommending that D66 and CDA negotiate further, which ultimately led to the formation of the Jetten cabinet.

=== Nederlandse Spoorwegen (2022–present) ===
On 1 November 2022, Koolmees became president and CEO (president-directeur) of Nederlandse Spoorwegen (NS), the principal Dutch national railway operator. Upon taking office, he spent time working as a train conductor to better understand frontline challenges faced by staff and passengers. Under his leadership, NS has focused on improving punctuality and service reliability, reducing overcrowding, and advancing sustainability goals.
