= Marja van Bijsterveldt =

Dutch politician

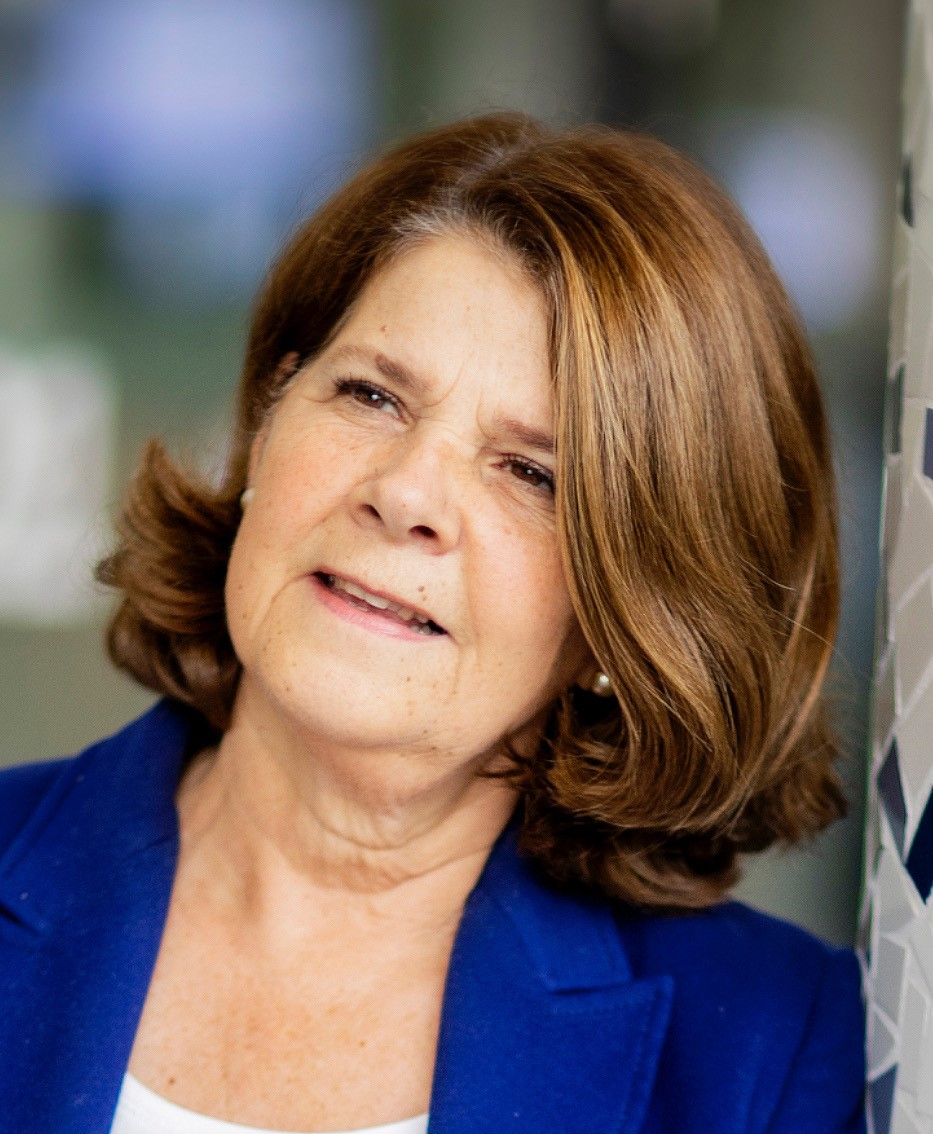
- Van Bijsterveldt in 2025 as Mayor of Delft

Mayor of Delft
- In office 2 September 2016 – 4 September 2025
- Preceded by: Bas Verkerk
- Succeeded by: Alexander Pechtold

Minister of Education, Culture and Science
- In office 14 October 2010 – 5 November 2012
- Prime Minister: Mark Rutte
- Preceded by: André Rouvoet
- Succeeded by: Jet Bussemaker

Member of the House of Representatives
- In office 17 June 2010 – 14 October 2010
- Parliamentary group: Christian Democratic Appeal

State Secretary for Education, Culture and Science
- In office 22 February 2007 – 14 October 2010 Serving with Sharon Dijksma
- Prime Minister: Jan Peter Balkenende
- Preceded by: Bruno Bruins
- Succeeded by: Halbe Zijlstra

Chairwoman of the Christian Democratic Appeal
- In office 2 November 2002 – 22 February 2007
- Leader: Jan Peter Balkenende
- Preceded by: Bert de Vries
- Succeeded by: Peter van Heeswijk

Mayor of Schipluiden
- In office 16 September 1994 – 1 January 2003
- Preceded by: Jan Waaijer
- Succeeded by: John de Prieëlle

Personal details
- Born: Janneke Marlene Vliegenthart; 27 June 1961 (age 65) Rotterdam, Netherlands
- Party: Christian Democratic Appeal
- Spouse: Antoine van Bijsterveldt (m. 1992)
- Children: 2 children
- Relatives: Arjan Vliegenthart (cousin)
- Occupation: Politician · Civil servant · Nonprofit director · Academic administrator · Nurse

Janneke Marlene "Marja" van Bijsterveldt-Vliegenthart (born 27 June 1961) is a Dutch politician of the Christian Democratic Appeal (CDA). She has been mayor of Delft since 2 September 2016.

== Early life ==
Van Bijsterveldt attended nursing school and worked in healthcare.

== Politics ==
In 1990 she became politically active for the Christian Democratic Appeal. She was an alderwoman (member) of the Almere municipal council but left her post after the mayor of Almere's expenses were investigated. Van Bijsterveldt disagreed with the way the other aldermen of the social-democratic PvdA and the liberal VVD had dealt with the matter, and following a motion of no-confidence she resigned.

In 1994 she was appointed to be Mayor of Schipluiden and at age 33, she became the youngest Mayor in Dutch history. She also was active within the CDA, first as chair of the Christian Democratic Youth Appeal (CDJA), the CDA's youth organization and later as chair of the CDA-women's council. In November 2002 van Bijsterveldt became party chair of the CDA. She was the first chair directly elected by the CDA membership. She beat the other candidate with 26,542 against 9,574 votes. She was reelected for a period of four years in 2006.

On 22 February 2007 Van Bijsterveldt was appointed State secretary for Education, Culture and Science in the fourth Fourth Balkenende cabinet. In August 2009 she made a speech in the States General about Laura Dekker, a thirteen-year-old Dutch citizen whose plans to circumnavigate the world solo caused international controversy. Van Bijsterveldt spoke against Dekker and agreed with the decision to make her a ward of court. In her recent interview with De Telegraaf, she added: ‘I am concerned about the excessive individualization in the Netherlands’, one of her next tasks before she get retired.

== Decorations ==
Honours
Ribbon bar	Honour	Country	Date	Comment
	Officer of the Order of Orange-Nassau	Netherlands	10 December 2012	

Party political offices
Preceded by Bert de Vries	Chairwoman of the Christian; Democratic Appeal; 2002–2007	Succeeded by Peter van Heeswijk
Political offices
Preceded by Jan Waaijer	Mayor of Schipluiden; 1994–2003	Succeeded by John de Prieëlle
Preceded by Bruno Bruins	State Secretary for Education, Culture and Science; 2007–2010; Served alongside: Sharon Dijksma	Succeeded by Halbe Zijlstra
Preceded by André Rouvoet	Minister of Education, Culture and Science; 2010–2012	Succeeded by Jet Bussemaker
Preceded by Bas Verkerk	Mayor of Delft; 2016–present	Incumbent
Academic offices
Unknown	President of the Protestant Theological University; 2013–2016	Unknown
Non-profit organization positions
Unknown	Chairwoman of the Ronald McDonald House; Charities Netherlands; 2013–2016	Unknown
