= Sharon Dijksma =

Dutch politician (born 1971)

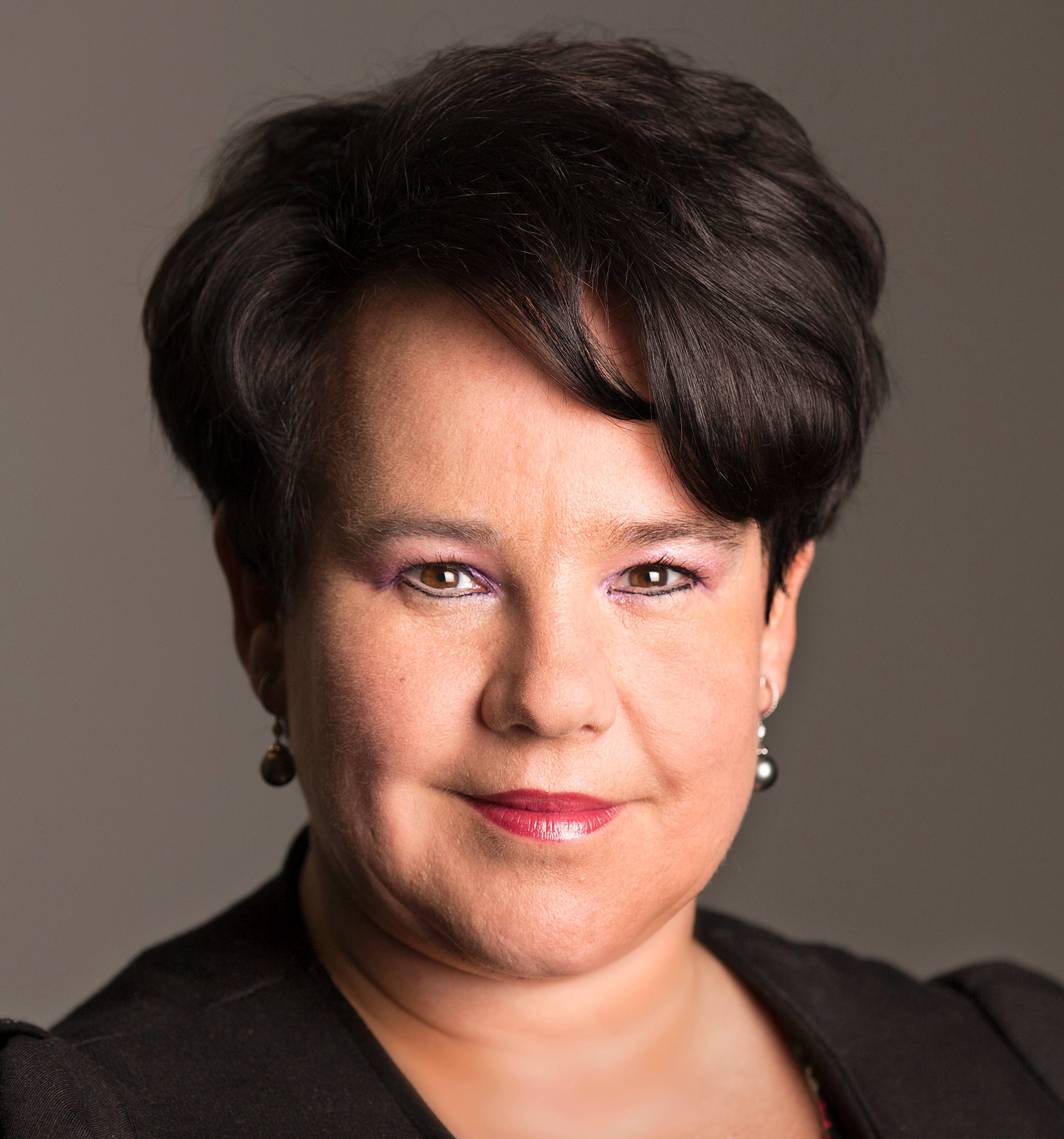
- Dijksma in 2015

Mayor of Utrecht
- Incumbent
- Assumed office 16 December 2020
- Preceded by: Peter den Oudsten (Acting)

State Secretary for Infrastructure and the Environment
- In office 3 November 2015 – 26 October 2017
- Prime Minister: Mark Rutte
- Preceded by: Wilma Mansveld
- Succeeded by: Stientje van Veldhoven (as State Secretary for Infrastructure and Water Management)

State Secretary for Economic Affairs
- In office 18 December 2012 – 3 November 2015
- Prime Minister: Mark Rutte
- Preceded by: Co Verdaas
- Succeeded by: Martijn van Dam

State Secretary for Education, Culture and Science
- In office 22 February 2007 – 23 February 2010 Serving with Marja van Bijsterveldt
- Prime Minister: Jan Peter Balkenende
- Preceded by: Bruno Bruins
- Succeeded by: Marja van Bijsterveldt

Member of the House of Representatives
- In office 23 March 2017 – 1 June 2018
- In office 8 May 2012 – 20 September 2012
- In office 17 June 2010 – 17 January 2012
- In office 17 May 1994 – 22 February 2007

Personal details
- Born: Sharon Alida Maria Dijksma; 16 April 1971 (age 55) Groningen, Netherlands
- Party: Labour Party (since 1988)
- Children: 1 son and 2 daughters
- Occupation: Politician

Sharon Alida Maria Dijksma (born 16 April 1971) is a Dutch politician serving as Mayor of Utrecht since 2020. A member of the Labour Party (PvdA), she was previously a State Secretary at the Ministry of Education, Culture and Science from 2007 to 2010, at the Ministry of Economic Affairs from 2012 to 2015 and at the Ministry of Infrastructure and the Environment from 2015 to 2017, as well as an alderwoman of Amsterdam from 2018 until 2020.

Dijksma was the President of the Environment Council of the European Union who, together with the Vice-President of the European Commission Maroš Šefčovič, signed the Paris Agreement on behalf of Europe in New York on 21 April 2016.

== Early life and education ==
Dijksma's father died in an accident, when she was ten years old. Dijksma studied law at the University of Groningen and public administration at the University of Twente but did not finish her studies.

== Career ==
In 1991 Dijksma became secretary general of the Young Socialists. From 1992 to 1994 she was chairwoman of the Young Socialists (Jonge Socialisten).

When, on 16 May 1994, Dijksma became an MP, her age was 23 and she was the youngest MP ever in Dutch parliamentarian history. From 1994 to 2007, she was a member of the House of Representatives.

Dijksma was the State secretary for Education, Culture and Science in the Fourth Balkenende cabinet from 2007 to 2010.

From 3 November 2015 until 26 October 2017 Dijksma was the State secretary of the Ministry of Infrastructure and the Environment succeeding to Wilma Mansveld who resigned from the position; from 18 December 2012 to 3 November 2015 she was the State secretary of the Ministry of Economic Affairs, dealing with agriculture, nature, food quality, tourism, and postal affairs. Therefore, Dijksma was allowed to use the ministerial title "Minister for Agriculture" while on foreign business. Before that she was an MP from 17 June 2010 to 19 September 2012. She focused on matters of traffic, water management and home affairs.

Dijksma was a member of the House of Representatives from 23 March 2017 until 30 May 2018.

In 2023, United Nations Secretary-General António Guterres appointed Dijksma to his Advisory Group on Local and Regional Governments.

== Decorations ==
Honours
Ribbon bar	Honour	Country	Date	Comment
	Knight of the Order of Orange-Nassau	Netherlands	3 December 2010	

Political offices
Preceded by Bruno Bruins	State Secretary for Education, Culture and Science; 2007–2010; Served alongside: Marja van Bijsterveldt	Succeeded by Marja van Bijsterveldt
Preceded by Co Verdaas	State Secretary for Economic Affairs; 2012–2015	Succeeded by Martijn van Dam
Preceded by Wilma Mansveld	State Secretary for Infrastructure and the Environment; 2015–2017	Succeeded by Stientje van Veldhoven as State Secretary for Infrastructure and Water Management
Preceded by Peter den Oudsten; Acting	Mayor of Utrecht; 2020–present	Incumbent
