= Marlies Veldhuijzen van Zanten =

Dutch politician

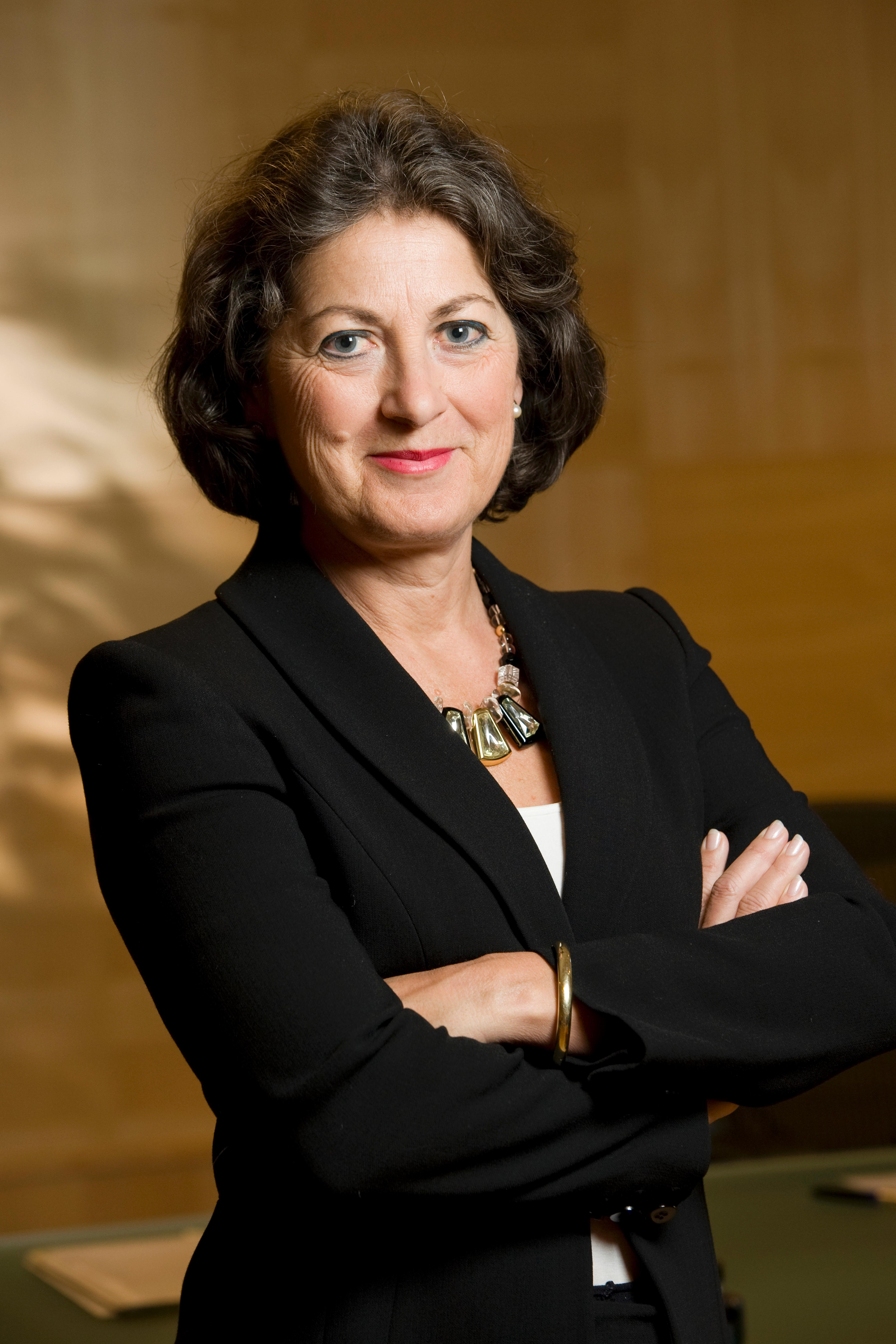
Marlies Veldhuijzen van Zanten

Marie Louise Lydia Elisabeth "Marlies" Veldhuijzen van Zanten-Hyllner (born 29 September 1953 in Gothenburg, Sweden) is a former Dutch politician of the Christian Democratic Appeal (CDA). She was the State Secretary for Health, Welfare and Sport in the first Rutte cabinet, serving from 14 October 2010 to 5 November 2012.
