= Clémence Ross-van Dorp =

Dutch politician

Clemencia Ignatia Johanna Maria Ross-van Dorp
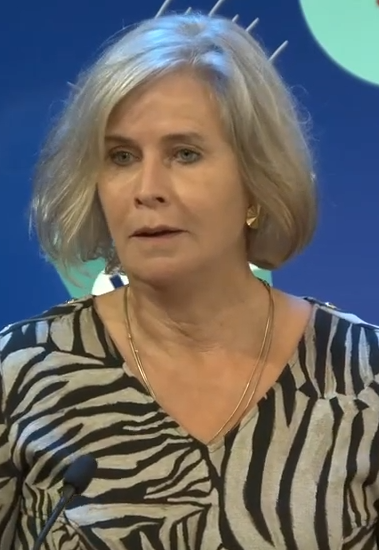

State Secretary of Health, Welfare and Sport
- In office 2002–2007
- Prime Minister: Jan Peter Balkenende

Member of the House of Representatives
- In office 1998–2002
- In office 2003–2003

Personal details
- Born: August 27, 1957 (age 68) Delft, Netherlands
- Party: Christian Democratic Appeal

Clemencia Ignatia Johanna Maria (Clémence) Ross-van Dorp (born 27 August 1957) is a Dutch politician who served as a member of the House of Representatives from 1998 until 2002 and in 2003, and as State Secretary of Health, Welfare and Sport from 2002 until 2007.
