= Ministry of Health, Welfare and Sport =

Government ministry of the Netherlands

- Ministerie van Volksgezondheid, Welzijn en Sport
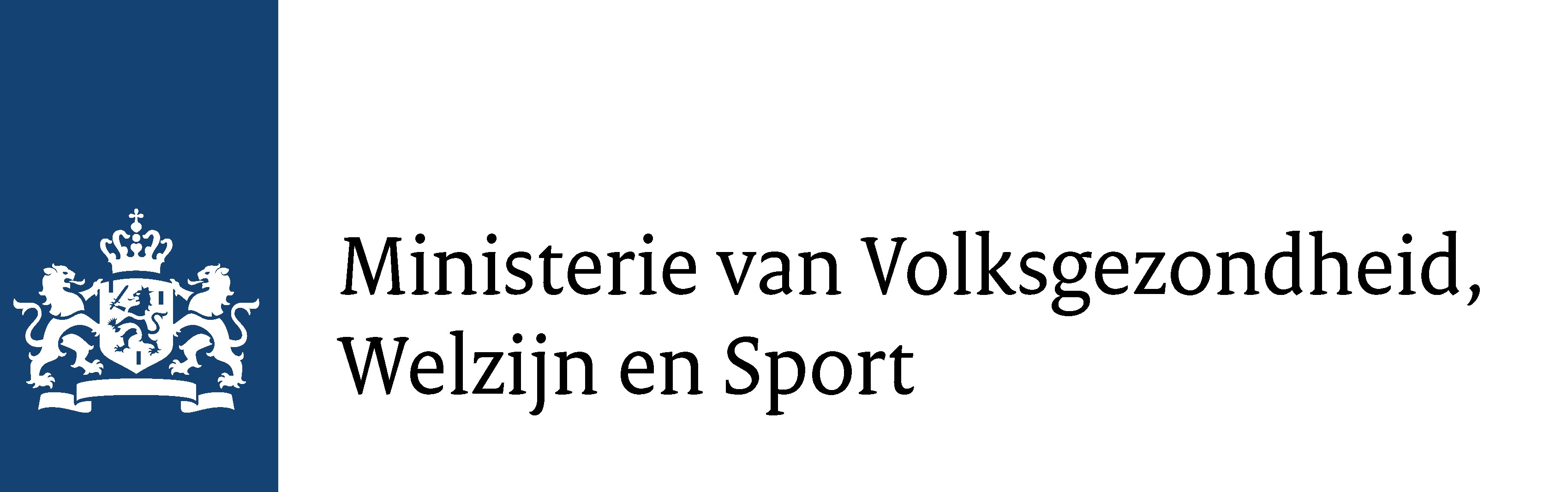
- Logotype of the Ministry of Health, Welfare and Sport

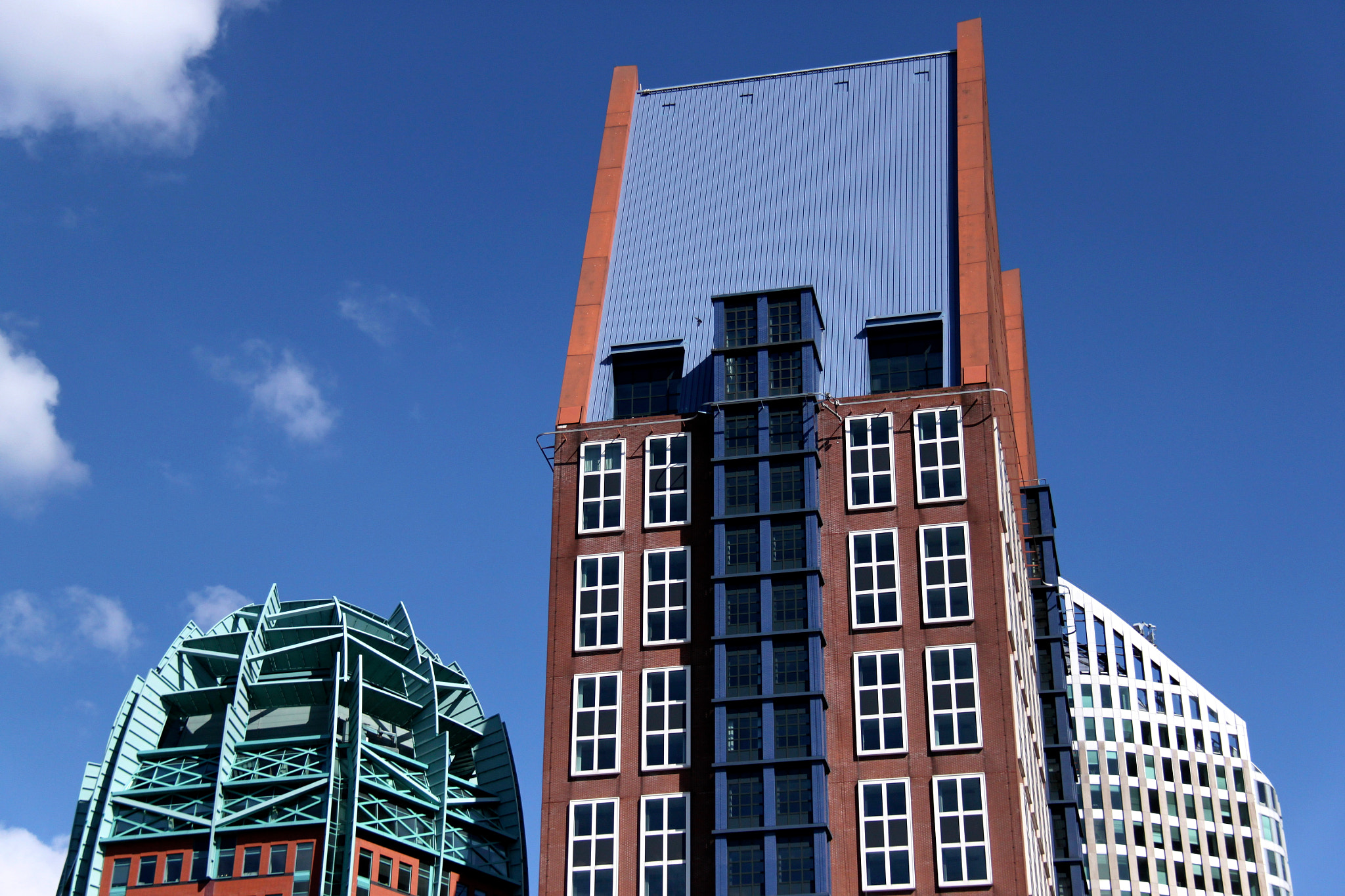
- Building of the Ministry of Health, Welfare and Sport

Department overview
- Formed: September 15, 1951; 74 years ago
- Jurisdiction: Kingdom of the Netherlands
- Headquarters: Parnassusplein 5, 2511 VX The Hague, Netherlands
- Annual budget: €79,7 billion (2018)
- Minister responsible: Sophie Hermans, Minister of Health, Welfare and Sport
- Deputy Ministers responsible: Judith Tielen, State Secretary of Health, Welfare and Sport; Nicki Pouw-Verweij, State Secretary of Health, Welfare and Sport
- Website: Ministry of Health, Welfare and Sport

The Ministry of Health, Welfare and Sport (Dutch: Ministerie van Volksgezondheid, Welzijn en Sport; VWS) is the Dutch Ministry responsible for public health, health care, quality of life, social work and sport. The Ministry was created in 1951 as the "Ministry of Social Affairs and Health" and had several name changes before it became the "Ministry of Health, Welfare and Sport" in 1994. The Ministry is headed by the Minister of Health, Welfare and Sport, currently Sophie Hermans (VVD).

== Organisation ==
The ministry is currently headed by a Cabinet Minister and two State secretaries. The ministry's main office is located in the centre of The Hague. The civil service is headed by a secretary general and a deputy secretary general, who head a system of three directorates general:

- Public Health, responsible for safety, prevention and sports
- Health Care, responsible for care, medicine and health insurance
- Youth and Welfare

The ministry is also responsible for several autonomous agencies, most prominently:

- Netherlands Institute for Social Research
- Netherlands National Institute for Public Health and the Environment

== History ==
There had been a ministry of Social Work since 1952. In 1965, it was also given responsibility for Culture and Recreation, and it was named Ministry of Culture, Recreation and Social Work. Between 1951 and 1973 there had been a Ministry of Social Affairs and Health Care. In 1973 a separate Ministry of Health and the Environment was formed. In 1982 these two ministries merged to form the Ministry for Health, Welfare and Sports. Responsibilities concerning the environment and nature management were given to the newly reorganized Ministry of Housing, Spatial Planning and the Environment and Agriculture, Nature and Fisheries. The ministry built a new headquarters in 2003 designed by the architect and Driehaus Prize winner Michael Graves. In 1996 the responsibility for culture was transferred to the newly reorganized Ministry of Education, Science and Culture.

== See also ==
- List of ministers of health of the Netherlands
