= 2012 Christian Democratic Appeal leadership election =

18 May 2012	2020 →
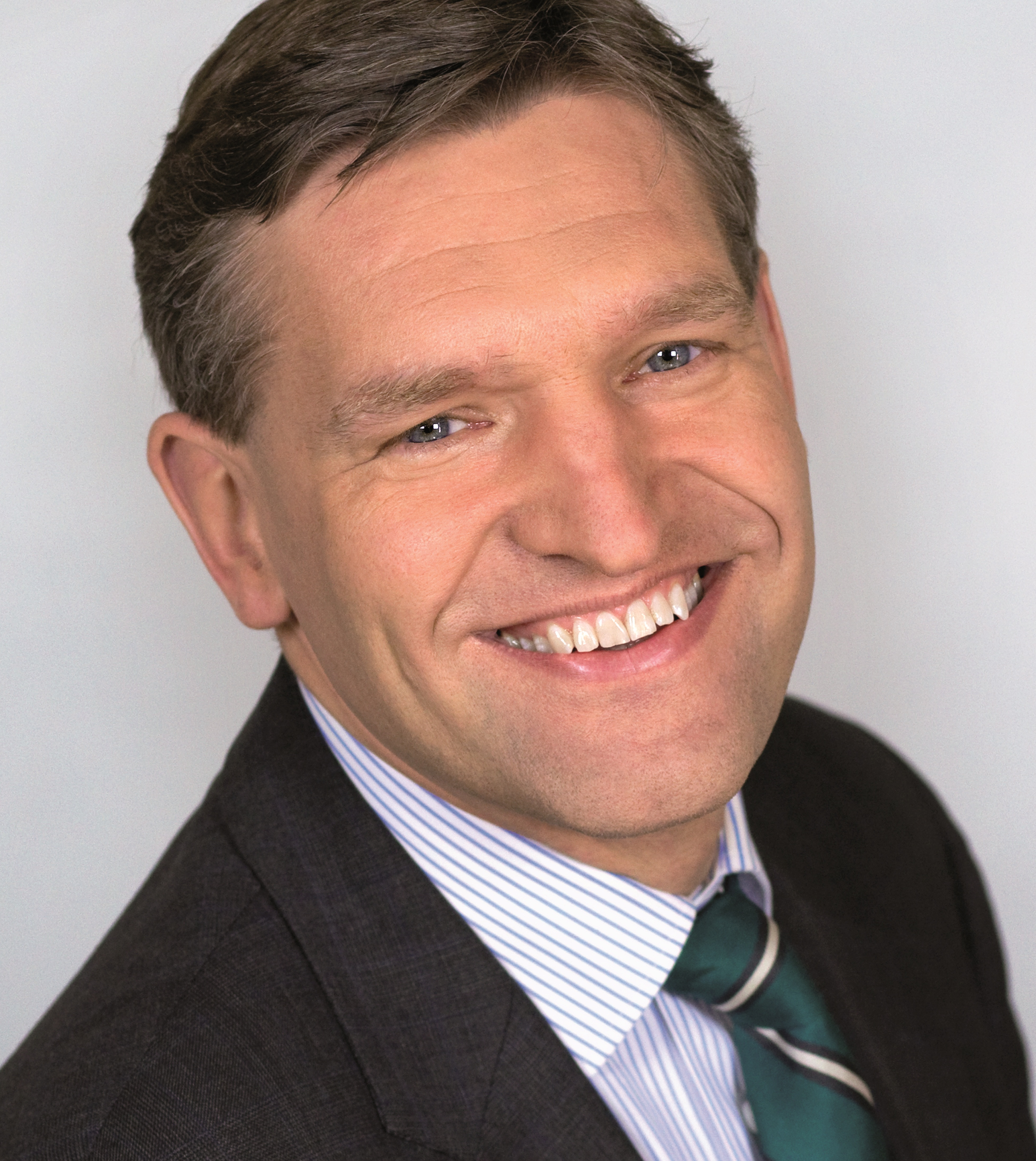

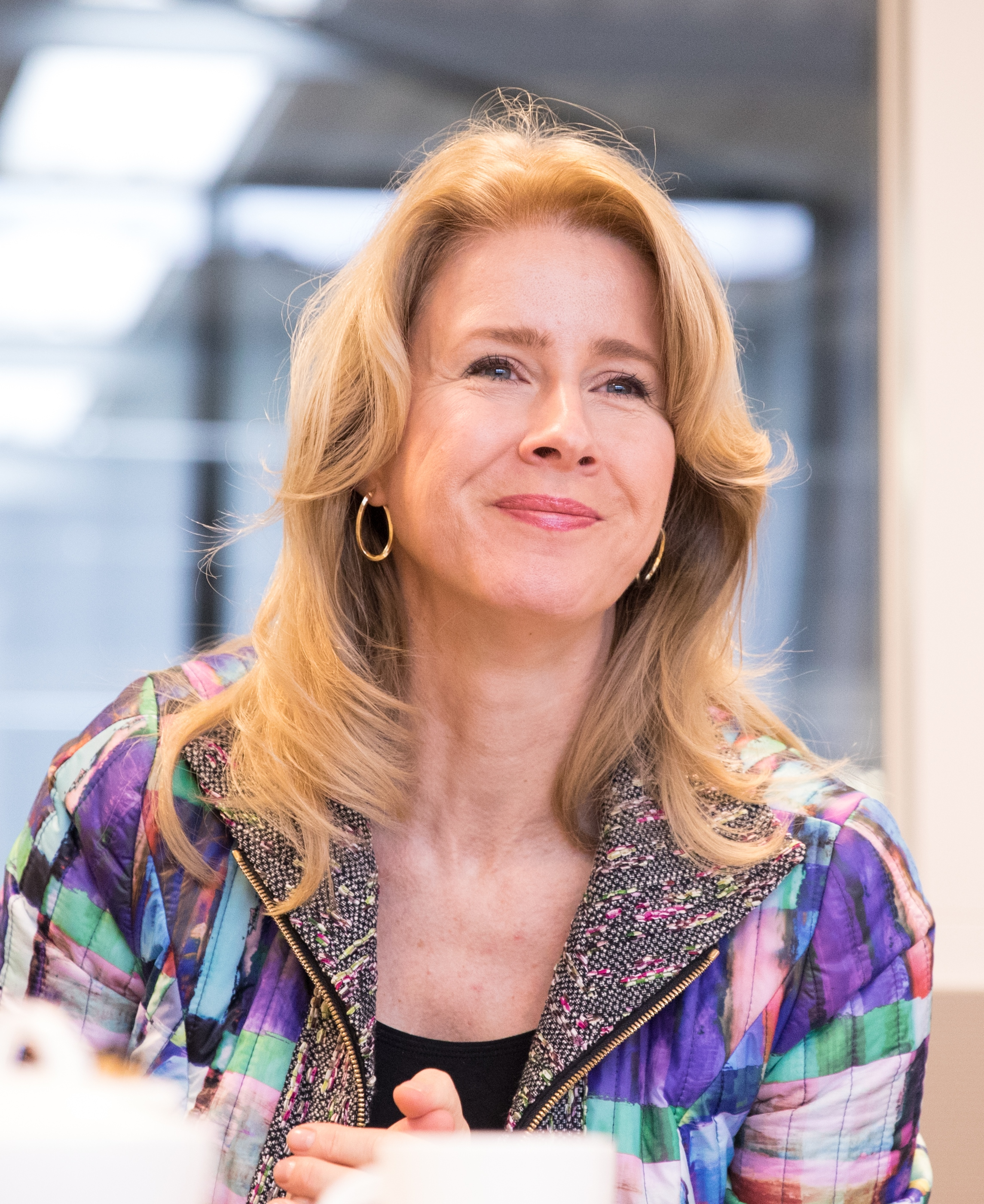

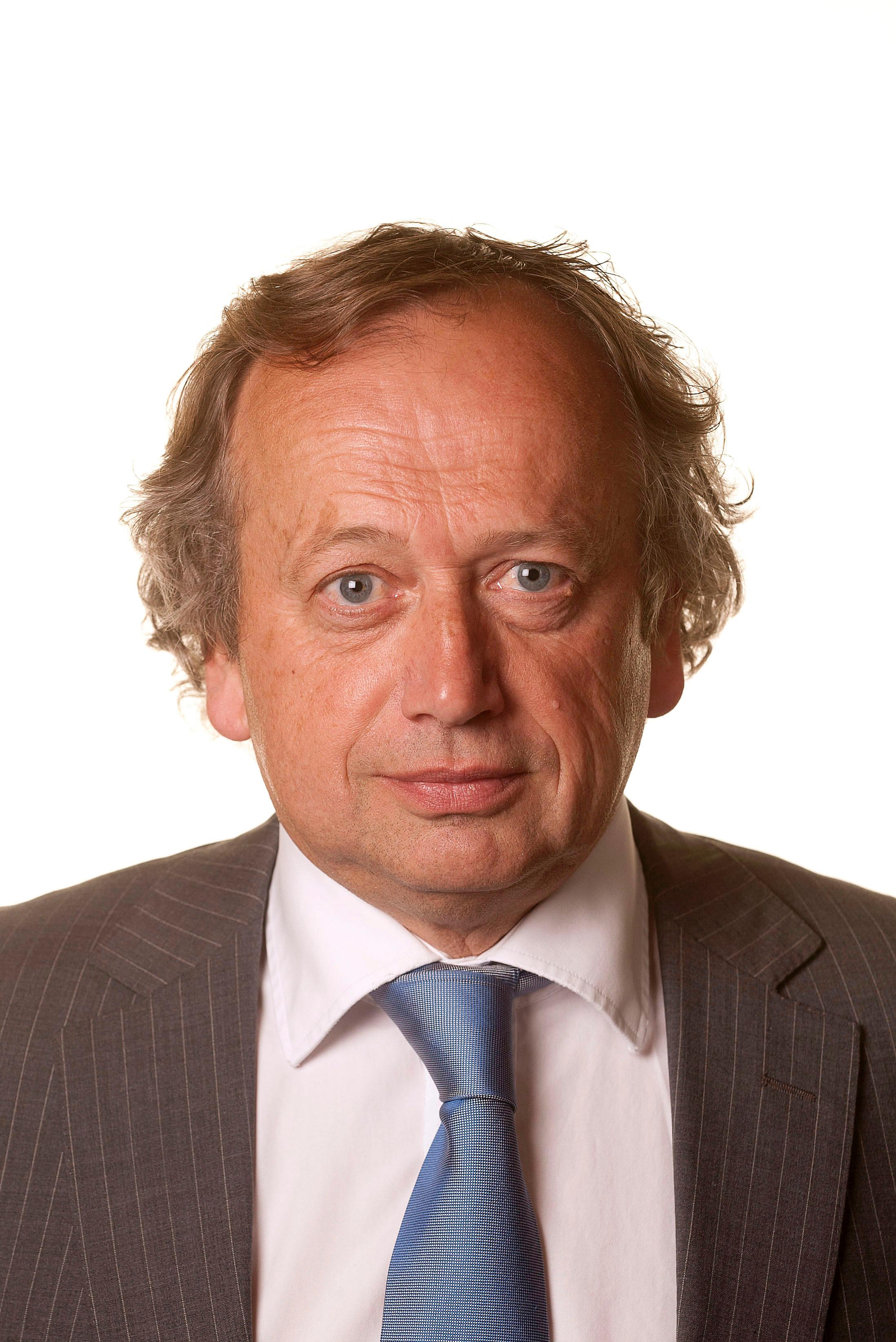

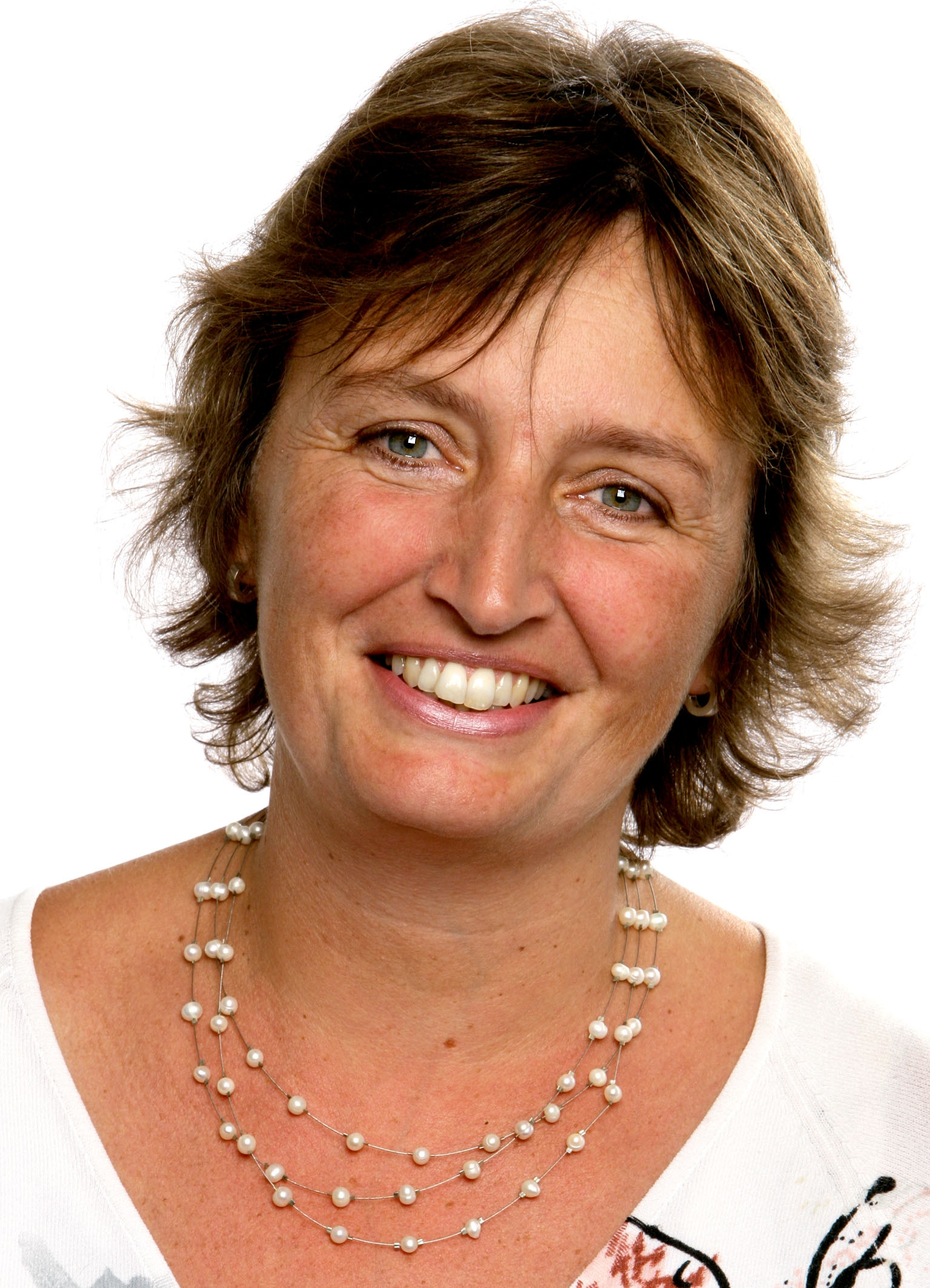

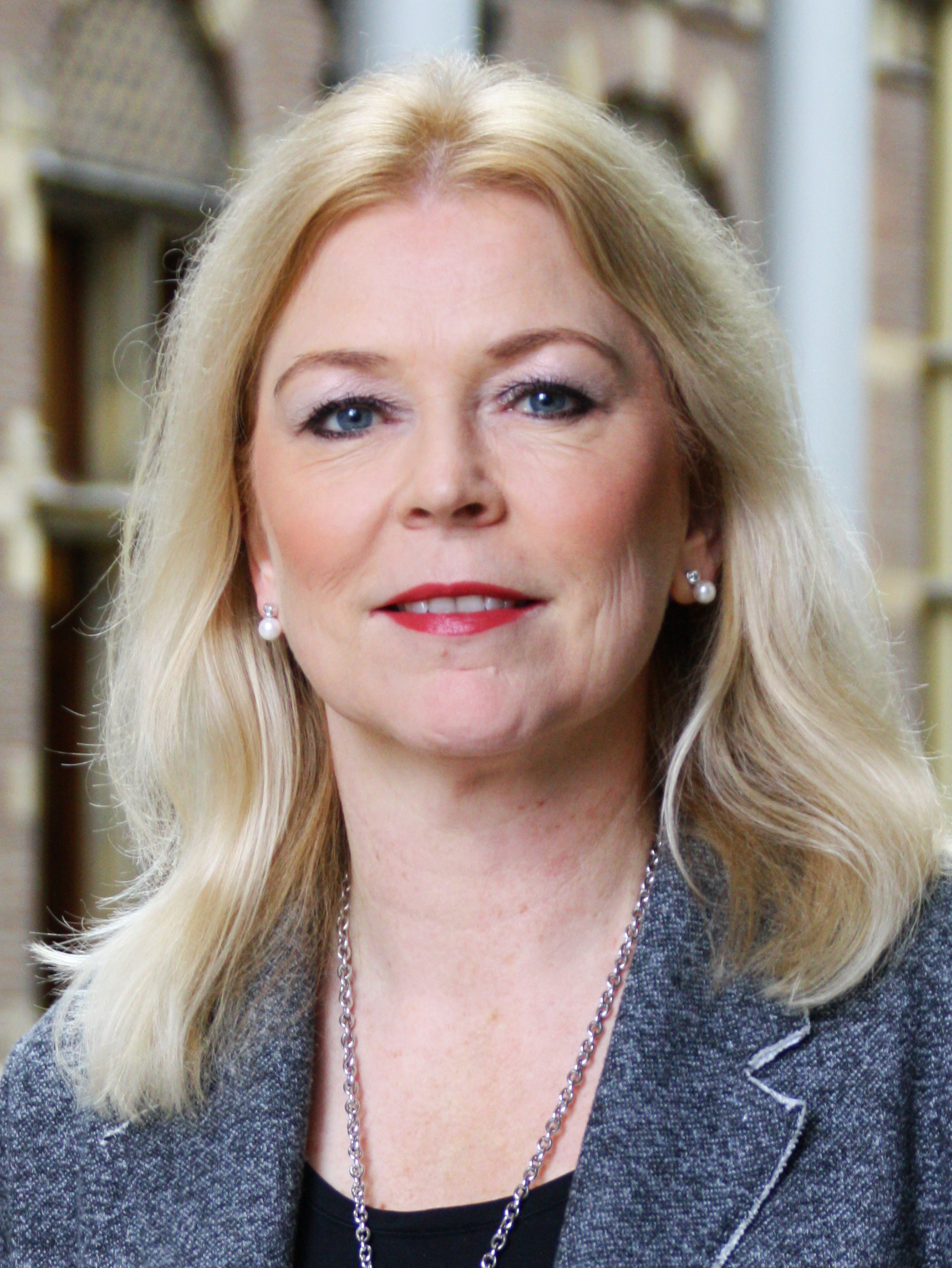
Candidate	Sybrand van Haersma Buma	Mona Keijzer
Percentage	51.4%	26.4%
Candidate	Marcel Wintels	Henk Bleker
Percentage	9.5%	7.3%
Candidate	Liesbeth Spies	Madeleine van Toorenburg
Percentage	3.7%	1.7%
Leader before election
Maxime Verhagen
Leader-elect
Sybrand van Haersma Buma

The 2012 Christian Democratic Appeal leadership election was called to elect the new Leader of the Christian Democratic Appeal after incumbent Maxime Verhagen announced his retirement from national politics. Verhagen who had been the acting leader of the party since the resignation of Jan Peter Balkenende on 9 June 2010 did not stand for the leadership election. Sybrand van Haersma Buma the Parliamentary leader of the Christian Democratic Appeal in the House of Representatives beat the other candidates in the first round with 51.4% of the votes.

== Background ==
For the Dutch general election of 2010, Balkenende, for a fourth time as Lijsttrekker, resigned his position as leader on 9 June 2010, taking political responsibility for the CDA's disappointing results in the election. He remained as Prime Minister until the new Rutte cabinet I was installed on 14 October 2010. After the formation of the 2010 Dutch cabinet, Maxime Verhagen the unofficial Deputy leader of the CDA, and Mark Rutte the Leader of the People's Party for Freedom and Democracy agreed on a coalition with the Party for Freedom (PVV). Verhagen became Deputy Prime Minister and Minister of Economic Affairs, Agriculture and Innovation in the Rutte cabinet I. Verhagen shared some of the party leadership with Ruth Peetoom, the Party chair and Sybrand van Haersma Buma, the Parliamentary leader of the Christian Democratic Appeal in the House of Representatives.

The coalition was a minority cabinet, but with the support of the Party for Freedom, it had a small majority in the House of Representatives of the Netherlands until 20 March 2012, the day Hero Brinkman left the PVV. Although Brinkman had stated he would continue supporting the minority cabinet as an independent politician, the PVV withdrew its support on 21 April 2012 after negotiations on new austerity measures collapsed. His withdrawal paved the way for early elections.

== Candidates ==
Candidates were able to participate until 5 May 2012. The following CDA members announced their candidacy.

Candidate	Position(s) at that time	Former position(s)
Sybrand van Haersma Buma (born 1965)	Parliamentary leader in the House of Representatives (since 2010); Member of the House of Representatives (since 2002)	
Liesbeth Spies (born 1966)	Minister of the Interior and Kingdom Relations (since 2011)	Member of the House of Representatives (2002–2010); Partychair (2010–2011)
Henk Bleker (born 1953)	Undersecretary for Economic Affairs, Agriculture and Innovation (since 2010)	Partychair (2010)
Madeleine van Toorenburg (born 1968)	Member of the House of Representatives (since 2007)	
Mona Keijzer (born 1968)	Alderperson in Purmerend (since 2007)	
Marcel Wintels (born 1963)		

== Results ==
On 18 May 2012 Sybrand van Haersma Buma got 51.4% of the votes, and a second round was not necessary.

== Declined to run ==
The following people, who were speculated to be potential candidates for the leadership election but publicly denied interest, declared that they would not run, or decided to retire from politics.

- Maxime Verhagen
  - Former: Minister of Economic Affairs, Agriculture and Innovation and Deputy Prime Minister, Minister of Foreign Affairs, Minister for Development Cooperation, Parliamentary leader - House of Representatives, Member of the House of Representatives, Member of the European Parliament
- Jan Kees de Jager
  - Former: Minister of Finance, State Secretary for Finance, Member of the House of Representatives
- Marja van Bijsterveldt
  - Former: Minister of Education, Culture and Science, State Secretary for Education, Culture and Science, Member of the House of Representatives, Party chair, Mayor of Schipluiden
- Camiel Eurlings
  - Former: Minister of Transport, Public Works and Water Management, Member of the House of Representatives, Member of the European Parliament
- Ab Klink
  - Former: Minister of Health, Welfare and Sport, Member of the House of Representatives, Member of the Senate
