= List of party chairs of the Christian Democratic Appeal =

This is a list of party chairs of the Dutch political party Christian Democratic Appeal (CDA).

== List ==
Name	Start	End	Ref.
Piet Steenkamp	25 April 1975	11 October 1980	
Piet Bukman	11 October 1980	14 July 1986	
Bert Fleers (Note: Acting party chair.)	14 July 1986	22 November 1986	
Wim van Velzen	31 January 1987	7 March 1994	
Tineke Lodders	7 March 1994	4 February 1995	
Hans Helgers	4 February 1995	27 February 1999	
Marnix van Rij	27 February 1999	27 September 2001	
Bert de Vries	10 October 2001	2 November 2002	
Marja van Bijsterveldt	3 November 2002	22 February 2007	
C.J. Dekker	22 February 2007	2 June 2007	
Peter van Heeswijk	2 June 2007	10 June 2010	
Henk Bleker	10 June 2010	1 November 2010	
Liesbeth Spies	1 November 2010	2 April 2011	
Ruth Peetoom	2 April 2011	9 February 2019	
Rutger Ploum	9 February 2019	19 March 2021	
Marnix van Rij	3 April 2021	11 December 2021	
Hans Huibers	11 December 2021	10 August 2023	
Mark Buck	10 August 2023	23 March 2024	
Jean Wiertz	23 March 2024		
