= 2020 Christian Democratic Appeal leadership election =

- 6–11 July 2020 (first round); 11–14 July 2020 (second round)
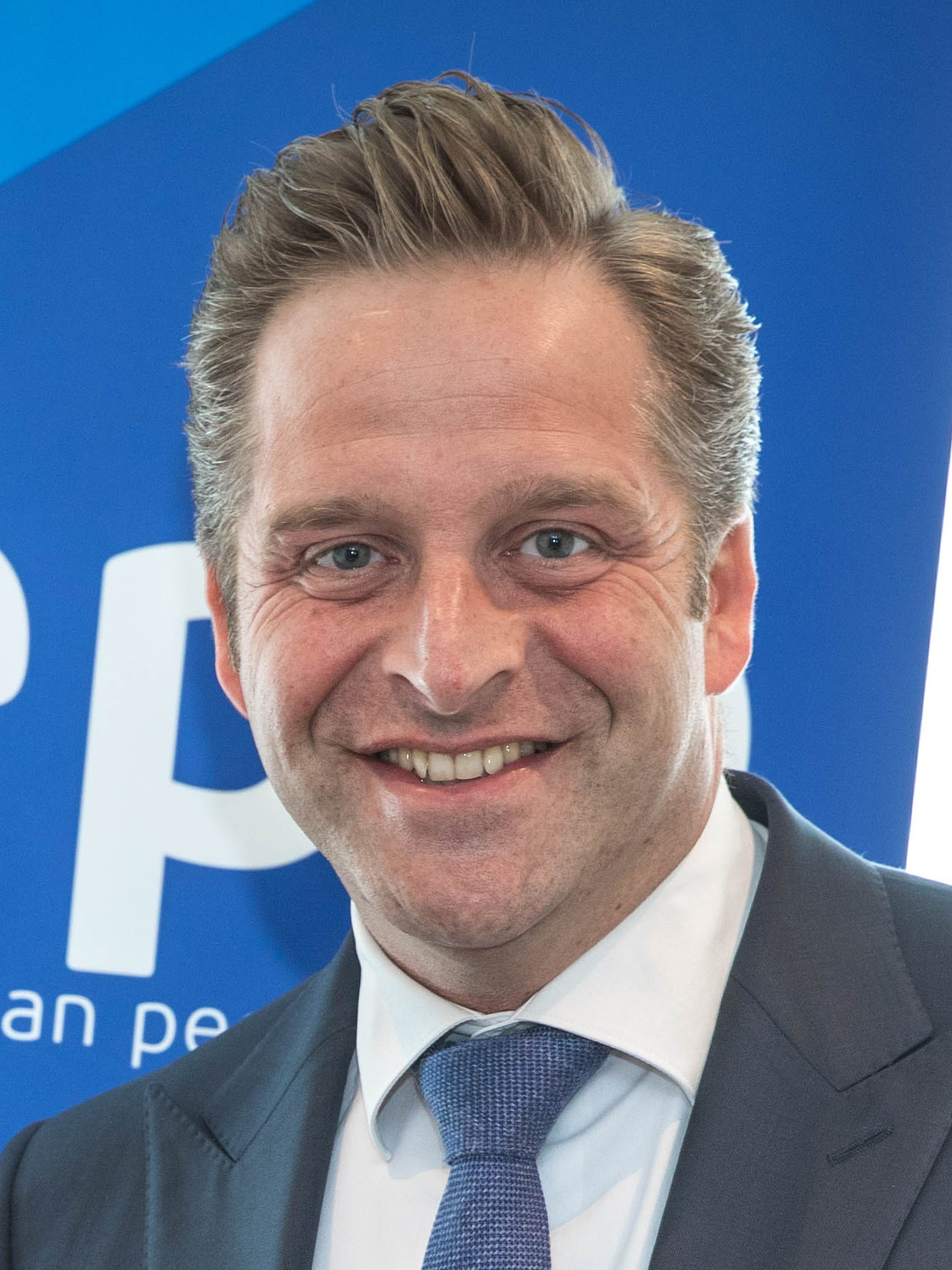

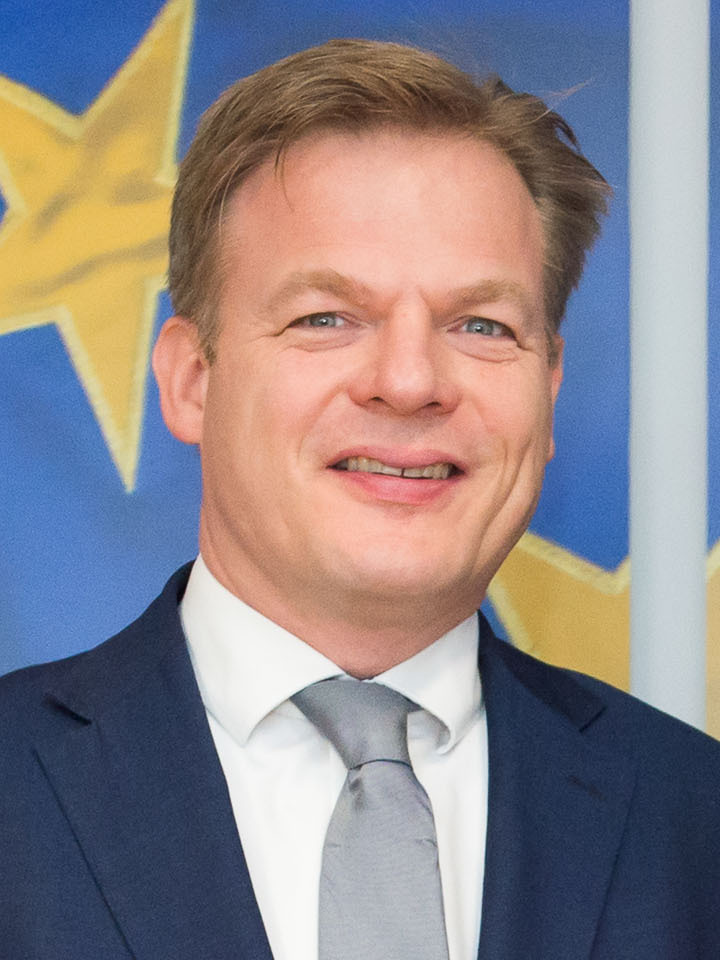
Candidate	Hugo de Jonge	Pieter Omtzigt
Percentage	50.7%	49.3%
Leader before election
Sybrand Buma (2012–19),
Vacant (2019–20)
Elected leader
Hugo de Jonge

The 2020 Christian Democratic Appeal leadership election was called to elect the new leader and lead candidate (lijsttrekker) of the Christian Democratic Appeal (CDA) in the run-up to the 2021 Dutch general election.

== Background ==
The position of party leader of the CDA had been vacant since the appointment of incumbent party leader Sybrand van Haersma Buma as mayor of Leeuwarden in May 2019. The CDA has no formal procedure in place for selecting a replacement. Initially, the party had intended to promote its leader in the House of Representatives, Pieter Heerma, to the position of party leader, but Heerma declined this offer.

Speculation that either Hugo de Jonge or Wopke Hoekstra would be selected instead, prompted Mona Keijzer to demand the CDA to hold an internal referendum over who the new party leader should be. Keijzer had already participated in earlier leadership elections, which she lost to Sybrand Buma.

Some party prominents, including Hugo de Jonge, feared a leadership election could divide the party and advised the executive board to appoint a new leader instead. Nonetheless, the board decided to hold an election to choose the new party leader.

Five party members announced their candidacy for the party leadership: Hugo de Jonge, Mona Keijzer, Pieter Omtzigt, Martijn van Helvert, and André Reumkens. The candidacy of Reumkens was declined by the board. The first round of the election was held between 6 and 11 July 2020. A second round was held between 11 and 14 July 2020.

== Candidates ==
=== Nominated ===
The following CDA members announced their candidacy:

Candidate	Born	Political office(s)	Education	Religion	Announced	Endorsements
Hugo de Jonge	26 September 1977 (age 42); Bruinisse, Zeeland	Deputy Prime Minister (2017–2022), Minister of Health, Welfare and Sport (2017–2022), Alderman of Rotterdam (2010–2017)	Bachelor of Education	Protestant	18 June 2020	Sybrand Buma, Ferdinand Grapperhaus, Ruth Peetoom
Pieter Omtzigt	8 January 1974 (age 46); The Hague, South Holland	Member of the House of Representatives (2003–2010; 2010–present)	Doctor of Philosophy in Economics	Roman Catholic	25 June 2020	Mona Keijzer

==== Eliminated ====
Candidate	Born	Political office(s)	Education	Religion	Announced	Eliminated
Mona Keijzer	9 October 1968 (age 51); Edam, North Holland	State Secretary for Economic Affairs and Climate Policy (2017–2021), Member of the House of Representatives (2012–2017), Alderwoman of Purmerend (2007–2012), Deputy mayor and alderwoman of Waterland (1998–2005)	Master of Laws, Master of Public Administration	Roman Catholic	23 June 2020	11 July 2020

==== Withdrawn ====
Candidate	Born	Political office(s)	Education	Religion	Announced	Withdrawn
Martijn van Helvert	7 April 1978 (age 42); Sittard, Limburg	Member of the House of Representatives (2014–2021), Member of the States of Limburg (2011–2015)	Doctorandus in History	Roman Catholic	24 June 2020	30 June 2020

=== Declined ===
- André Reumkens, candidate 2018 municipal elections in Beekdaelen

== Timeline ==
Candidate status
Nominated
Nominated; eliminated after the first round
Nominated; withdrawn from the election
Events
Nominations announced
Voting opens
Result announced (first round)
Voting closes (second round)
Result announced

== Opinion polls ==
View source data.

Date(s) administered	Poll source	Sample	Van Helvert	De Jonge	Keijzer	Omtzigt	Hoekstra*	Van Toorenburg*	Other	Undecided
9–10 May 2019	EenVandaag	1,000 CDA voters	—	29%	9%	—	40%	3%	18%	
9–10 May 2019	EenVandaag	300 CDA members	—	20%	5%	—	59%	4%	12%	
28 Oct – 7 Nov 2019	EenVandaag	2,283 CDA voters	—	21%	16%	—	39%	—	3%	21%
March 2020	EenVandaag	1,188 CDA voters	—	22%	14%	—	43%	—	21%	
27 April 2020	EenVandaag	1,188 CDA voters	—	35%	9%	—	50%	—	6%	
27–30 Jun 2020	EenVandaag	2,250 CDA voters	0%	47%	15%	34%	—	—	4%	
* = not a candidate

== Results ==
Candidate	First round	Second round
Hugo de Jonge	48.7%	50.7%
Pieter Omtzigt	39.7%	49.3%
Mona Keijzer	11.6%	
Source: NOS

== Aftermath ==
Following his victory, Hugo de Jonge announced that he and Omtzigt would run as lead candidates for the 2021 Dutch general election together, calling Omtzigt his "running mate". Four months later, however, De Jonge found that the position of party leader was difficult to combine with his role as Minister of Health, Welfare and Sport, given the attention required of him during the COVID-19 pandemic. On 12 November 2020, he resigned from his position as party leader. The day after, the party's executive board announced that it had chosen Wopke Hoekstra as the new party leader, despite the fact that Hoekstra did not participate in the leadership election.

Pieter Omtzigt claimed that party chair Rutger Ploum had promised him that he would be allowed to take De Jonge's place in the event of the latter's resignation, and expressed his dissatisfaction with Hoekstra's appointment. Omtzigt temporarily resigned from campaigning in February 2021, a month before the general election, because he was overworked. On 12 June 2021, Omtzigt left split from CDA and continued as an independent Member of Parliament. He alleged he was being harassed by CDA prominents for his investigations into the Dutch childcare benefits scandal and his critical stance in the leadership election.
