= Peetoom =

Peetoom is a surname. Notable people with the surname include:

- Darren Peetoom (born 1969), English professional darts player
- Kirsten Peetoom (born 1988), Dutch professional racing cyclist
- Ruth Peetoom (born 1967), Dutch politician
