= Mona Keijzer =

Dutch politician (born 1968)

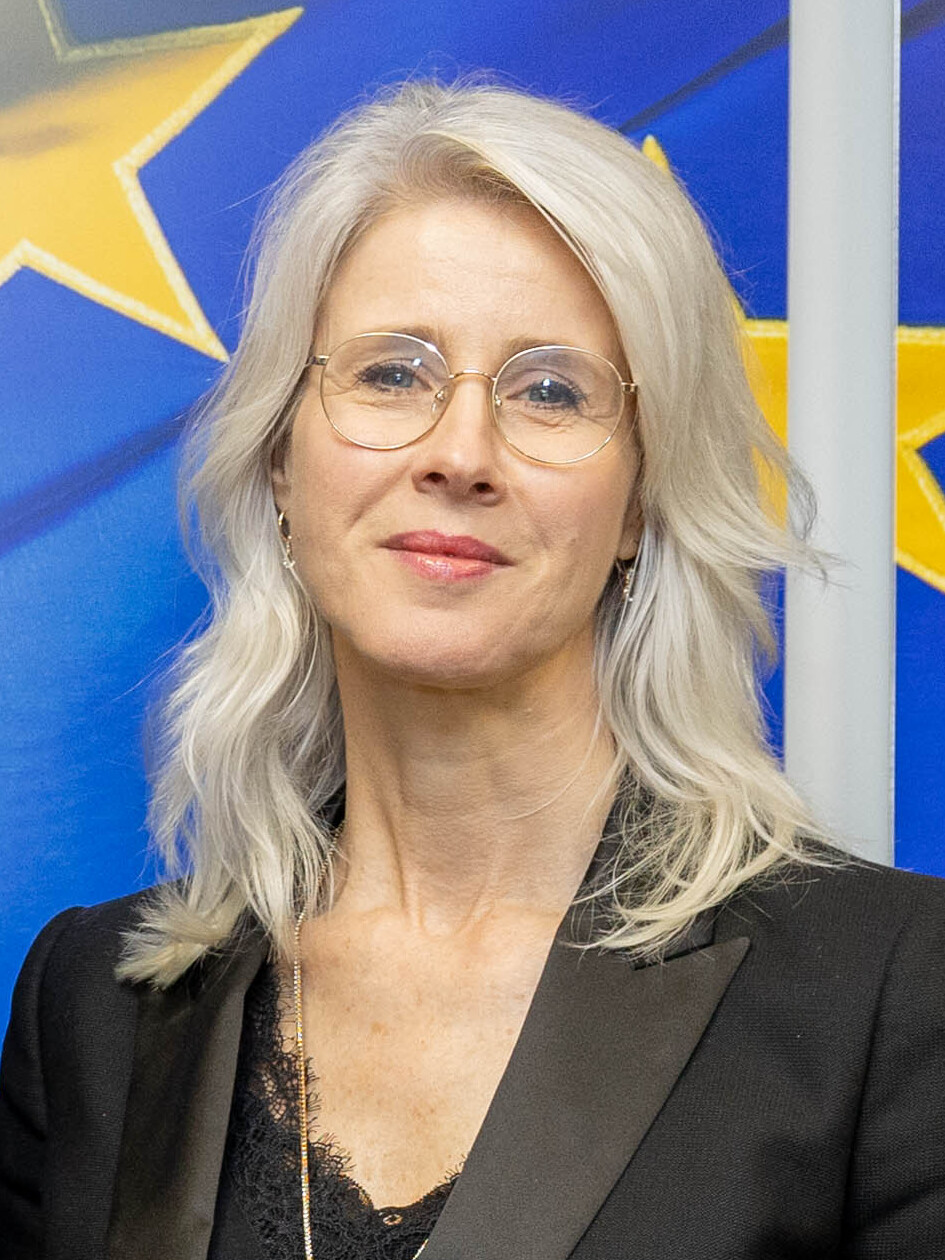
- Keijzer in 2025

Deputy Prime Minister of the Netherlands
- In office 2 July 2024 – 23 February 2026 Serving with Fleur Agema (2024–2025), Sophie Hermans (2024–2026), and Eddy van Hijum (2024–2025)
- Prime Minister: Dick Schoof

Minister of Housing and Spatial Planning
- In office 2 July 2024 – 23 February 2026
- Prime Minister: Dick Schoof
- Preceded by: Hugo de Jonge (Note: As minister without portfolio)
- Succeeded by: Elanor Boekholt-O'Sullivan

Member of the House of Representatives
- Incumbent
- Assumed office 12 November 2025
- In office 6 December 2023 – 2 July 2024
- In office 31 March 2021 – 27 September 2021
- In office 20 September 2012 – 26 October 2017

State Secretary for Economic Affairs and Climate Policy
- In office 26 October 2017 – 25 September 2021 Serving with Dilan Yeşilgöz (2021)
- Prime Minister: Mark Rutte
- Preceded by: Martijn van Dam
- Succeeded by: Hans Vijlbrief

Alderwoman of Purmerend
- In office 7 March 2006 – 19 September 2012

Alderwoman of Waterland
- In office 18 November 1998 – 7 March 2006

Personal details
- Born: Maria Cornelia Gezina Keijzer; 9 October 1968 (age 57) Edam, Netherlands
- Party: Independent
- Other political affiliations: CDA (1989–2023); BBB (2023–2026)
- Children: 5
- Education: University of Amsterdam (LLM, MA)
- Occupation: Politician; lawyer; mediator; civil servant

Maria Cornelia Gezina "Mona" Keijzer (born 9 October 1968) is a Dutch politician. She is currently an independent member of the House of Representatives, after she left the Farmer–Citizen Movement (BoerBurgerBeweging, BBB) in February 2026. Between 2024 and 2026 she was minister of housing and spatial planning on behalf of BBB in the Schoof cabinet.

Formerly a member of the Christian Democratic Appeal (CDA), she served in the third Rutte cabinet as State Secretary for Economic Affairs and Climate Policy alongside Dilan Yesilgöz-Zegerius from 26 October 2017 until 25 September 2021. Keijzer served in the House of Representatives between 2012 and 2017, and again for six months from 31 March 2021 until 27 September 2021. She focused on matters of nursing, home care and culture. Before becoming a full-time politician, she worked as an environmental jurist for the municipalities of Waterland and Almere, as well as for the province of Gelderland.

== Early life ==
Keijzer was born in a Catholic family in Edam, and she has an older brother and a younger sister. Her father had several jobs, including as fisher and construction worker. She attended the Werenfridus secondary school in Hoorn at VWO level, and she studied juridical public administration and public law at the University of Amsterdam.

== Politics ==
=== Christian Democratic Appeal ===
Keijzer started her political career as a member of the municipal council of Waterland from 1996 to 2002 and was later an alderwoman from 1998 to 2006. Subsequently, she worked as a lawyer and mediator in 2005 and 2006. Afterwards she was an alderwoman of neighbouring municipality of Purmerend from 2007 to 2012.

In 2012, Keijzer contested the CDA leadership election in an attempt to become the party's lijsttrekker for the 2012 general election. Although performing unexpectedly well in the elections, she let Sybrand van Haersma Buma go first. Placed second on the list of candidates, Keijzer was elected to the House of Representatives, receiving 127,446 votes, and she served as her party's spokesperson for curative care, asylum, and integration. She was reelected in the 2017 general election with 165,384 votes.

On 26 October 2017, Keijzer was appointed State Secretary for Economic Affairs and Climate Policy in the third Rutte cabinet. In this capacity, she was responsible for consumer policy, small and medium-sized enterprises, telecom, post and market regulation.

In a joint statement in October 2020, Keijzer and her French counterpart Cédric O called for a European Union authority to regulate large technology companies and argued that such an authority should be able to prevent digital platforms from blocking access to their services "unless they have an objective justification."

In 2020, she again contested the CDA leadership election, but came third, after Hugo de Jonge and Pieter Omtzigt. Placed seventh on the party's candidate list for the 2021 general election, Keijzer was reelected, obtaining 18,031 votes.

On 25 September 2021 Keijzer was dismissed from her cabinet position after publicly criticising the cabinet's position on COVID-19 measures. While forced resignations are not unheard of, being removed from a cabinet position has little precedent. The last time a cabinet member was fired was in 1975, although in that instance Jan Glastra van Loon was allowed to resign. Before Keijzer's discharge, no other cabinet member had actually been fired since World War II. Media outlets reported that Keijzer refused to resign. Keijzer also resigned from the House of Representatives two days later.

=== Farmer–Citizen Movement MP ===
On 1 September 2023, Keijzer joined the Farmer–Citizen Movement (BBB) and it was announced that she would be the party's candidate in position two for the November 2023 election, as well as the BBB candidate for the position of Prime Minister. She assisted her party in subsequent cabinet formation talks. In the House, Keijzer served as the BBB's spokesperson for the interior, digital affairs, migration, social affairs, and media. She raised the possibility of declaring certain parts of Ukraine safe during Russia's invasion of the country such that refugees could return. She also suggested refugees would have to contribute more financially towards their sheltering to discourage an influx.

Defending strict asylum rules in May 2024, Keijzer called antisemitism "almost part of Islamic culture" in reference to the origin of many asylum seekers. Criminal complaints were subsequently filed against her for group defamation, but the Public Prosecution Service decided in July not to bring charges. It stated that her statements were illegal and constituted group insult, but it argued that they had been made by a politician as part of political discourse on migration. Filers of the criminal complaints tried to compel the agency to prosecute her through a legal procedure, while Keijzer started a similar procedure to compel the agency to withdraw its opinion on the illegality of her statements. Keijzer's lawyer called the reasoning of the Public Prosecution Service stigmatizing.

=== Minister of Housing and Spatial Planning ===
After the PVV, VVD, NSC, and BBB formed the Schoof cabinet, Keijzer was sworn in as Fourth Deputy Prime Minister and as Minister of Housing and Spatial Planning on 2 July 2024. The Ministry of Housing and Spatial Planning was simultaneously re-established after its responsibilities had been handled by different ministries since 2010. Keijzer succeeded Hugo de Jonge, who served as a minister without portfolio.

She was tasked with overseeing the construction of 100,000 homes per year in response to a housing shortage, the same target set for her predecessor. The coalition agreement included €1 billion in yearly funding for that purpose for the next five years. In December 2024, Keijzer organized a housing summit at which an agreement was struck with organizations representing lower governments, housing corporations, investors, developers, and the construction industry. It included expedited construction of 75,000 housing units in several locations. The signatories committed to cooperating more closely, while the government would reduce regulations. The agreement reaffirmed the requirement of Keijzer's predecessor that two thirds of new construction should be affordable, despite opposition from the private sector. However, the restriction would be enforced regionally instead of for every project.

=== Split from BBB ===
Keijzer was again elected as member of the House after the October 2025 general election, although the party lost three seats. Shortly after the election, according to Keijzer, an agreement had been made that Keijzer would succeed Van der Plas as parliamentary and party leader. Her colleagues in the parliamentary group however changed their minds and selected co-founder Henk Vermeer as Van der Plas' successor on 13 February 2026. While Keijzer was focused on broader topics, such as asylum and migration, Vermeer had a stronger focus on agriculture. Keijzer subsequently decided to leave the group on 23 February 2026. Following calls to initiate mediation, Keijzer announced at a special general meeting on 27 March that she would end her membership of the BBB.

In August, Keijzer announced she was forming a new political party, with the working name of "Project 2029".

== Personal life ==
Keijzer is married to a urologist and has five sons. She lives in Ilpendam and belongs to the Catholic Church. Her father-in-law is a former alderman of Waterland for the CDA.

== Electoral history ==
Electoral history of Mona Keijzer
Year	Body	Party	Pos.	Votes	Result		Ref.
Year	Body	Party	Pos.	Votes	Party seats	Individual	Ref.
2010	House of Representatives	Christian Democratic Appeal	67	442	21	Lost	
2012	House of Representatives	Christian Democratic Appeal	2	127,446	13	Won	
2017	House of Representatives	Christian Democratic Appeal	2	165,384	19	Won	
2021	House of Representatives	Christian Democratic Appeal	7	18,031	15	Won	
2023	House of Representatives	Farmer–Citizen Movement	2	43,005	7	Won	
2025	House of Representatives	Farmer–Citizen Movement	2	111,839	4	Won	

== Notes ==
Political offices
Preceded by Martijn van Dam	State Secretary for Economic Affairs and Climate Policy; 2017–2021	Succeeded by Hans Vijlbrief
Preceded by Hugo de Jonge	Minister of Housing and Spatial Planning; 2024–present	Incumbent
Preceded by Rob Jetten, Karien van Gennip, and Carola Schouten	Deputy Prime Minister; 2024–present Served alongside: Fleur Agema, Sophie Hermans, and Eddy van Hijum	Incumbent
