= Piet Bukman =

Dutch politician and diplomat (1934–2022)

His Excellency Piet Bukman
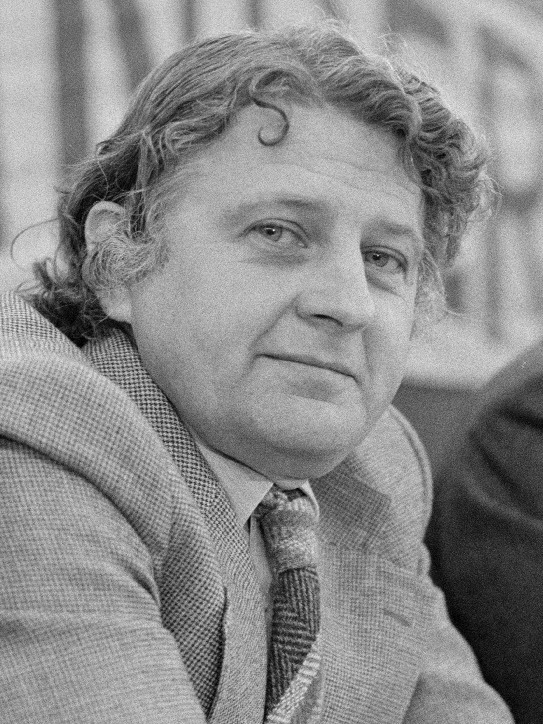
- Bukman in 1980

Speaker of the House of Representatives
- In office 3 December 1996 – 19 May 1998
- Preceded by: Wim Deetman
- Succeeded by: Jeltje van Nieuwenhoven

Minister of Agriculture, Nature and Fisheries
- In office 28 September 1990 – 22 August 1994
- Prime Minister: Ruud Lubbers
- Preceded by: Bert de Vries (ad interim)
- Succeeded by: Jozias van Aartsen

State Secretary for Economic Affairs
- In office 7 November 1989 – 28 September 1990
- Prime Minister: Ruud Lubbers
- Preceded by: Yvonne van Rooy
- Succeeded by: Yvonne van Rooy

Member of the House of Representatives
- In office 17 May 1994 – 19 May 1998
- In office 14 September 1989 – 7 November 1989

Minister of Defence
- In office 6 September 1988 – 24 September 1988; Ad interim
- Prime Minister: Ruud Lubbers
- Preceded by: Wim van Eekelen
- Succeeded by: Frits Bolkestein

Minister for Development Cooperation
- In office 14 July 1986 – 7 November 1989
- Prime Minister: Ruud Lubbers
- Preceded by: Eegje Schoo
- Succeeded by: Jan Pronk

President of the European People's Party
- In office 10 July 1985 – 30 July 1987
- Preceded by: Leo Tindemans
- Succeeded by: Jacques Santer

Member of the Senate
- In office 10 June 1981 – 14 July 1986

Chairman of the Christian Democratic Appeal
- In office 11 October 1980 – 14 July 1986
- Leader: Dries van Agt (1980–1982); Ruud Lubbers (1982–1986)
- Preceded by: Piet Steenkamp
- Succeeded by: Wim van Velzen

Member of the Social and Economic Council
- In office 10 May 1968 – 1 December 1980
- Chairman: Jan de Pous

Personal details
- Born: Pieter Bukman; 7 February 1934 Delft, Netherlands
- Died: 15 March 2022 (aged 88) Voorschoten, Netherlands
- Party: Christian Democratic Appeal (from 1980)
- Other political affiliations: Anti-Revolutionary Party (until 1980)
- Education: Free University Amsterdam (Bachelor of Economics, Master of Economics)
- Occupation: Politician · Diplomat · Economist · Corporate director · Nonprofit director · Trade association executive · Lobbyist ·

Pieter Bukman (7 February 1934 – 15 March 2022) was a Dutch politician and diplomat of the Christian Democratic Appeal (CDA) party and economist.

== Biography ==
Bukman attended a Gymnasium in Delft from April 1946 until June 1952 and applied at the Free University Amsterdam in July 1952 majoring in Economics obtaining a Bachelor of Economics degree in June 1954 before obtaining a Master of Economics degree in July 1958. Bukman worked as a trade association executive for the Christian Farmers and Gardeners Association (CBTB) from August 1958 until December 1980 and served as general-secretary from May 1968 until September 1975 and as chairman from September 1975 until December 1980.

Bukman served as chairman of the Christian Democratic Appeal from 11 October 1980 until 14 July 1986. Bukman was elected to the Senate after the 1981 Senate election, taking office on 10 June 1981 serving as a frontbencher and spokesperson for agriculture. Bukman also served as President of the European People's Party from 10 July 1985 until 30 July 1987. After the 1986 general election Bukman was appointed Minister for Development Cooperation in the Lubbers II cabinet, taking office on 14 July 1986. Bukman served as acting Minister of Defence from 6 September 1988 until 24 September 1988 following the resignation of Wim van Eekelen. The Lubbers II cabinet fell on 3 May 1989 and continued to serve in a demissionary capacity. Bukman was elected to the House of Representatives after the 1989 general election, taking office on 14 September 1989. Following the cabinet formation of 1989 Bukman was appointed State Secretary for Economic Affairs in the Lubbers III cabinet, taking office on 7 November 1989. Bukman was appointed Minister of Agriculture, Nature and Fisheries following the resignation of Gerrit Braks, taking office on 28 September 1990. After the 1994 general election Bukman returned to the House of Representatives, taking office on 17 May 1994. The Lubbers III cabinet was replaced by the Kok I cabinet following the cabinet formation of 1994 on 22 August 1994 and he continued to serve in the House of Representatives as a frontbencher and spokesperson for development cooperation, development aid and Kingdom relations. After the Speaker of the House of Representatives Wim Deetman announced his resignation following his nomination as Mayor of The Hague, Bukman announced his candidacy to succeed him. Bukman won the election defeating party member and fellow frontbencher Ali Doelman-Pel and was elected as Speaker, taking office on 3 December 1996. On 23 September 1997 Bukman announced his retirement from national politics and that he would not stand for the 1998 general election and continued to serve until the end of the parliamentary term on 19 May 1998.

Bukman retired after spending 17 years in national politics and became active in the private sector and public sector and occupied numerous seats as a corporate director and nonprofit director on several boards of directors and supervisory boards (International Food Policy Research Institute, LEI Wageningen UR, European Cultural Foundation and the World Food Programme).

Bukman was known for his abilities as a team leader and manager. Bukman continued to comment on political affairs until his retirement in 2018 and held the distinction as the first unified Chairman of the Christian Democratic Appeal and as the only Dutchman that served as President of the European People's Party as of 2026.

== Electoral history ==
A (possibly incomplete) overview of Dutch elections Bukman participated in
Election	Party	Candidate number	Votes
1994 Dutch general election	Christian Democratic Appeal	11	
2022 Dutch municipal elections in Voorschoten	Christian Democratic Appeal	40	

== Decorations ==
Honours
Ribbon bar	Honour	Country	Date	Comment
	Grand Cross of the Order of the Crown	Belgium	6 July 1986	
	Grand Officer of the National Order of the Legion of Honour	France	21 March 1987	
	Grand Cross of the Order of Merit of the Federal Republic of Germany	Germany	10 December 1990	
	Commander of the Order of Orange-Nassau	Netherlands	8 October 1994	
	Grand Officer of the Order of Merit of the Italian Republic	Italy	1 September 1997	
	Grand Officer of the Order of the Oak Crown	Luxembourg	30 April 1998	

Party political offices
Preceded by Piet Steenkamp	Chairman of the Christian Democratic Appeal; 1980–1986	Succeeded by Wim van Velzen
Preceded by Leo Tindemans	President of the European People's Party; 1985–1987	Succeeded by Jacques Santer
Political offices
Preceded by Eegje Schoo	Minister for Development Cooperation; 1986–1989	Succeeded by Jan Pronk
Preceded by Wim van Eekelen	Minister of Defence; Ad interim 1988	Succeeded by Frits Bolkestein
Preceded by Yvonne van Rooy	State Secretary for Economic Affairs; 1989–1990	Succeeded by Yvonne van Rooy
Preceded by Bert de Vries; Ad interim	Minister of Agriculture, Nature and Fisheries; 1990–1994	Succeeded by Jozias van Aartsen
Preceded by Wim Deetman	Speaker of the House of Representatives; 1996–1998	Succeeded by Jeltje van Nieuwenhoven
Business positions
Preceded by Jan de Koning	General-Secretary of the Executive Board of the Christian Farmers and Gardeners Association; 1971–1975	Unknown
Unknown	Chairman of the Executive Board of the Christian Farmers and Gardeners Association; 1975–1980	Unknown
