= Martijn van Dam =

Dutch engineer and politician

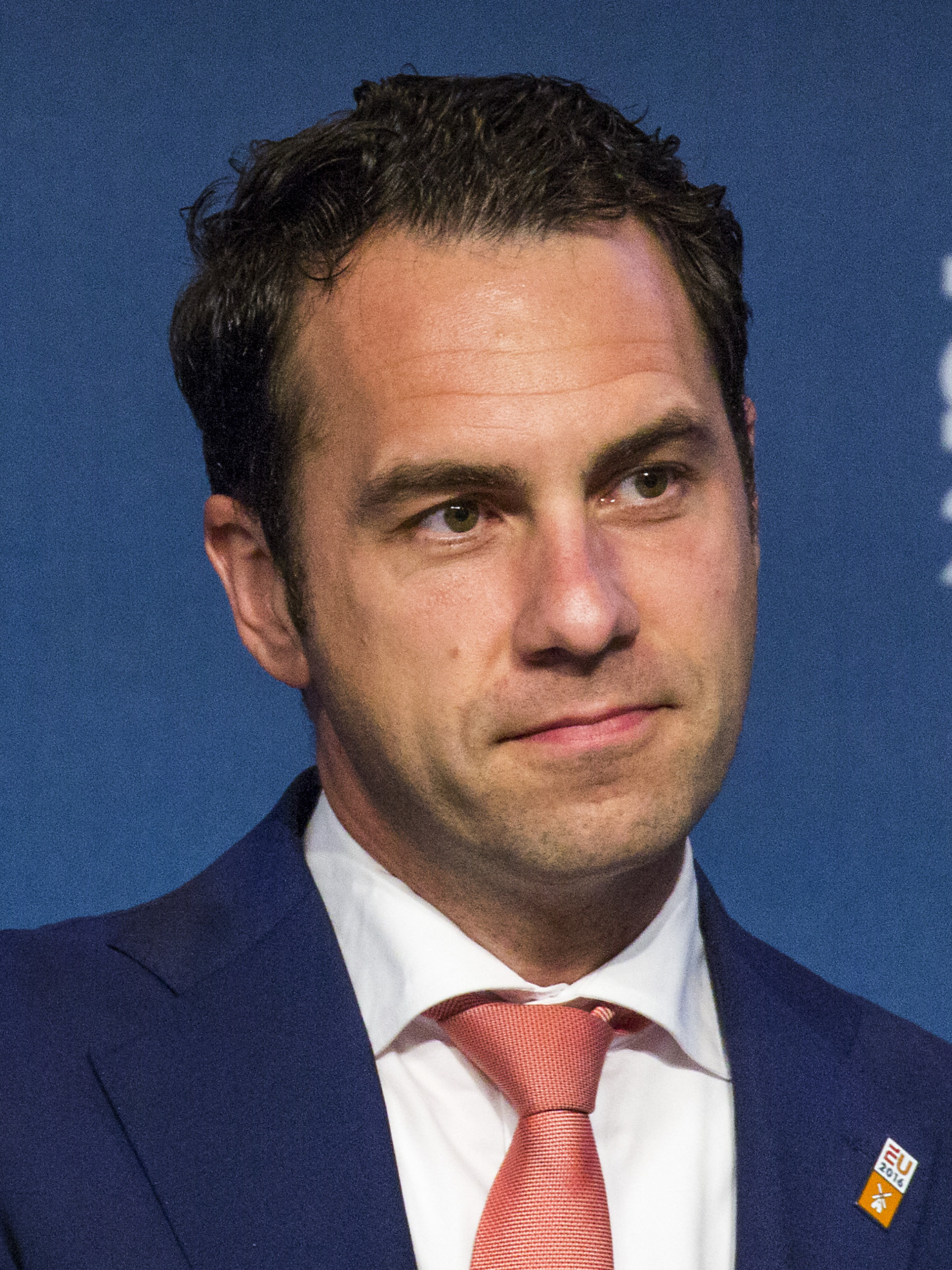
- Van Dam in 2016

State Secretary for Economic Affairs
- In office 3 November 2015 – 1 September 2017
- Prime Minister: Mark Rutte
- Preceded by: Sharon Dijksma
- Succeeded by: Mona Keijzer

Member of the House of Representatives
- In office 30 January 2003 – 3 November 2015

Personal details
- Born: Martinus Hendricus Petrus van Dam; 1 February 1978 (age 48) Zoetermeer, Netherlands
- Party: Labour Party
- Education: Eindhoven University of Technology (M.Sc., Technology management)
- Occupation: Politician, engineer
- Website: (in Dutch) Labour Party website

Martinus Hendricus Petrus "Martijn" van Dam (born 1 February 1978) is a Dutch engineer and politician. A member of the Labour Party (PvdA), he served as State Secretary for Economic Affairs from 3 November 2015 until 1 September 2017 in the Second Rutte cabinet. He was a member of the House of Representatives between 2003 and 2015. He previously served as councillor for the municipality of Eindhoven from April 1998 to January 2003. From the time he entered the States General on 30 January 2003 to 29 November 2006, he was the youngest member of the House.

== Education ==
Van Dam was born in Zoetermeer and grew up in Huissen. He moved to Eindhoven with his family in 1990, where he attended the Eindhoven University of Technology, where he studied Technology Management. He was active in different student associations and also joined the Young Socialists (Jonge Socialisten), eventually becoming the president of the Eindhoven chapter.

== Political involvement ==
=== Eindhoven City Council ===
In 1998 he ran for the Eindhoven City Council and became a councillor, later speaker for the Labour Party caucus in the city council and member of the national party committee of the Labour Party. After graduating from university, he worked at Philips until 2003.

=== House of Representatives ===
In 2003 he was elected member of the House of Representatives, becoming the youngest member. He moved to Utrecht in 2005. In his first period in the House Labour Party caucus, Van Dam was spokesman for media, technology and innovation. He quickly established himself in 2003 by frequently asking questions about the Discharge Fraud in the IT sector, whereby probation period discharges were being abused as a cost-cutting measure. Following the 2006 elections he became spokesman for foreign affairs, which made him the face of the Labour Party in the debate on the extension of the military mission in Uruzgan. In March 2007 he joined the caucus leadership. Van Dam was elected Political Talent of the Year 2005 by the parliamentary press corps.

=== State Secretary for Economic Affairs ===
In November 2015 Van Dam became State Secretary for Economic Affairs, succeeding Sharon Dijksma, who moved to the Ministry for Infrastructure and the Environment. He resigned on 1 September 2017.
