= Pieter van Geel =

Dutch politician (born 1951)

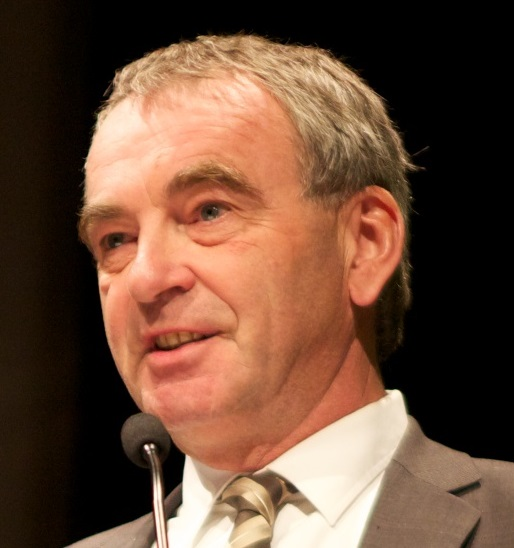
- Van Geel in 2012

Parliamentary leader in the House of Representatives
- In office 22 February 2007 – 17 June 2010
- Preceded by: Maxime Verhagen
- Succeeded by: Maxime Verhagen
- Parliamentary group: Christian Democratic Appeal

State Secretary for Housing, Spatial Planning and the Environment
- In office 22 July 2002 – 22 February 2007
- Prime Minister: Jan Peter Balkenende
- Preceded by: Johan Remkes
- Succeeded by: Office discontinued

Member of the House of Representatives
- In office 30 November 2006 – 17 June 2010
- In office 30 January 2003 – 27 May 2003
- In office 23 May 2002 – 22 July 2002
- Parliamentary group: Christian Democratic Appeal

Personal details
- Born: Petrus Leonardus Bastiaan Antonius van Geel; 8 April 1951 (age 75) Valkenswaard, Netherlands
- Party: Christian Democratic Appeal
- Education: Radboud University Nijmegen (Bachelor of Architecture, Master of Architecture)
- Occupation: Politician · Civil servant · Urban planner · Political consultant · Nonprofit director

Petrus Leonardus Bastiaan Antonius "Pieter" van Geel (born 8 April 1951) is a retired Dutch politician Christian Democratic Appeal (CDA) party and urban planner.

He was State Secretary of Housing, Spatial Planning and the Environment from 2002 until 2007 and a member of the House of Representatives in 2002, 2003 and from 2006 till 2010.

== Decorations ==
Honours
Ribbon bar	Honour	Country	Date	Comment
	Knight of the Order of Orange-Nassau	Netherlands	11 April 2007	

Party political offices
Preceded by Maxime Verhagen	Parliamentary leader of the Christian Democratic Appeal in the House of Representatives; 2007–2010	Succeeded by Maxime Verhagen
Unknown	Deputy Chairman of the Christian Democratic Appeal; 2011–2015	Succeeded by Frank Kerckhaert
Political offices
Preceded by Johan Remkes	State Secretary for Housing, Spatial; Planning and the Environment; 2002–2007	Succeeded by Office discontinued
