= Jean Wiertz =

Dutch composer and party chair

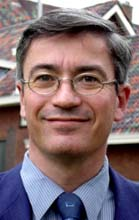
- Wiertz in 1993

Chair of the Christian Democratic Appeal
- Incumbent
- Assumed office 23 March 2024
- Preceded by: Hans Huibers

Personal details
- Born: Jean Wiertz; 1958 or 1959 (age 66–67) Schaesberg, Netherlands
- Party: Christian Democratic Appeal
- Children: 2
- Education: Maastricht Academy of Music
- Occupation: Composer; teacher; school administrator

Jean Wiertz (Dutch pronunciation: [ʑɑ̃ː ˈʋiːrts]; born 1958 or 1959) is a Dutch composer, music teacher, and school administrator. He has served as chairperson of the Christian Democratic Appeal (CDA) since March 2024.

== Life ==
Wiertz was born in Schaesberg, Limburg, and studied at Maastricht Academy of Music. He attended Utrecht and Leiden Universities before becoming a music teacher at the Rotterdam Sint-Laurenscollege high school in 1982. In addition to teaching, Wiertz worked as a composer and arranger for public broadcasters VARA, KRO, and NOS and contributed to the Rotterdam musicals Kaat Mossel (1992) and Mooi Katenderchet (1994).

He became principal of Sint-Laurenscollege in 2006, and he filled the same position simultaneously at Eckartcollege and Pleincollege – located in Eindhoven and Nuenen, respectively – between 2011 and 2017. He assumed the position of principal of the Sint-Janslyceum high school in 's-Hertogenbosch in the latter year. Wiertz was appointed chairperson of the CDA at a convention on 23 March 2024. He succeeded Hans Huibers, who had stepped down the summer before. Wiertz declared he wanted to restore the party's stability, honesty, and reliability following a loss of seats in the November 2023 general election.

== Personal life ==
Wiertz has two children, and he resided in Dordrecht as of 2017.

Party political offices
| Preceded by Hans Huibers | Chairperson of the Christian Democratic Appeal; 2024–present | Incumbent |
