= Co Verdaas =

Dutch politician

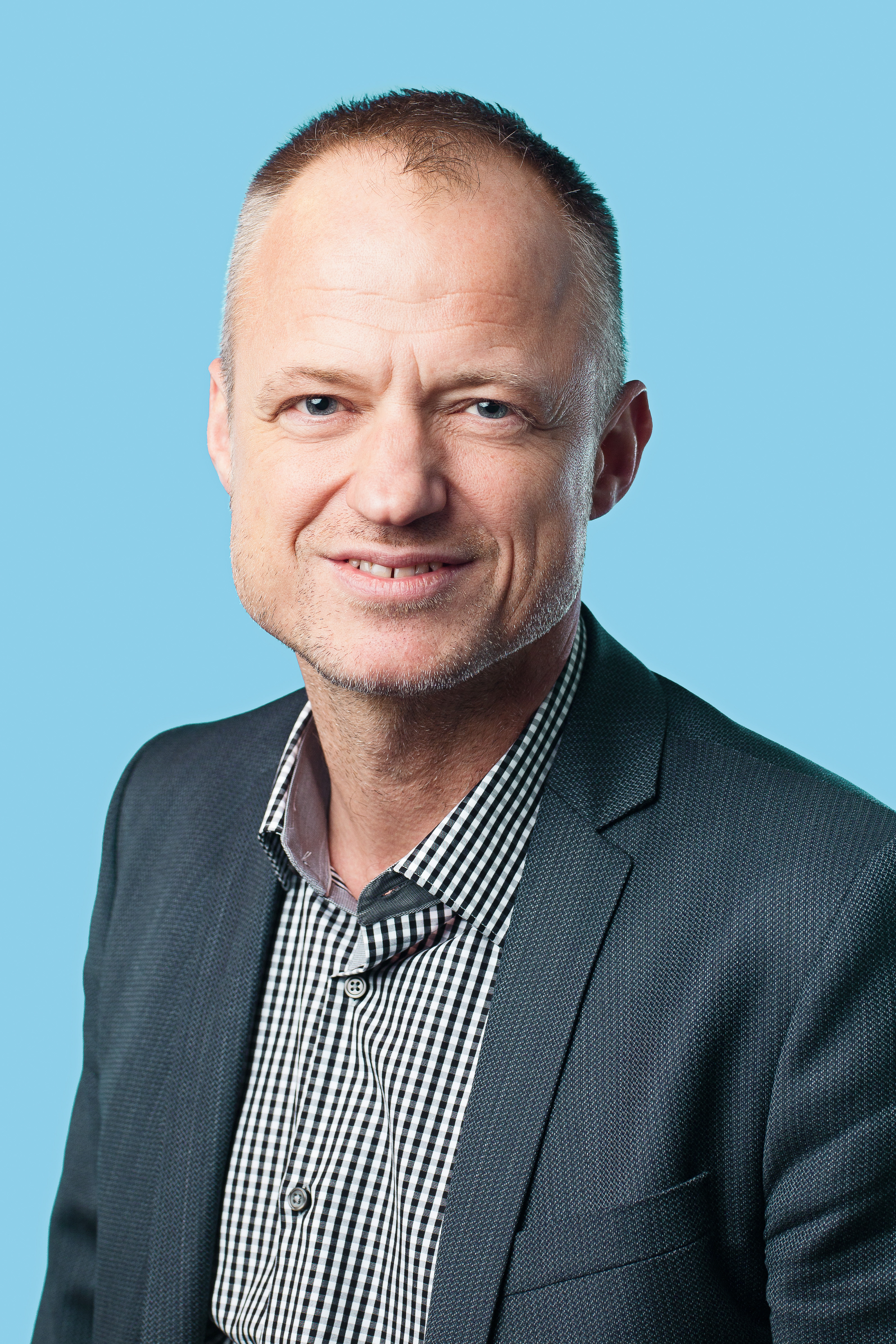

State Secretary for Economic Affairs
- In office 5 November 2012 – 6 December 2012
- Prime Minister: Mark Rutte
- Preceded by: Henk Bleker
- Succeeded by: Sharon Dijksma

Member of the House of Representatives
- In office 30 January 2003 – 29 November 2006

Personal details
- Born: Johannes Cornelis Verdaas; 5 August 1966 (age 60) Breda, Netherlands
- Party: Labour Party
- Education: Radboud University Nijmegen (MA and PhD in urban planning)
- Occupation: Politician; Civil servant Urban planner Consultant

Johannes Cornelis "Co" Verdaas (born 5 August 1966) is a Dutch politician of the Labour Party. He served as State Secretary for the Ministry of Economic Affairs, dealing with agriculture, nature, food quality, tourism and postal affairs in the Rutte II cabinet from 5 November 2012 until his resignation on 6 December 2012. He previously served as a Member of the House of Representatives from 30 January 2003 until 29 November 2006, and as a member of the provincial executive of Gelderland from 2007 to 2012. Due to doubtful traffic expenses in his capacity of last one, he stepped down as a State Secretary.

Verdaas studied urban planning at Radboud University Nijmegen. Het developed the so-called Ladder of Verdaas, a system for solving traffic problems. Besides he is singer and guitarist in the rock band John-Boy & The Waltons.

Government offices
Preceded by Henk Bleker	State Secretary for Economic Affairs; 2012	Succeeded by Sharon Dijksma
