= Piet Steenkamp =

Dutch politician (1925–2016)

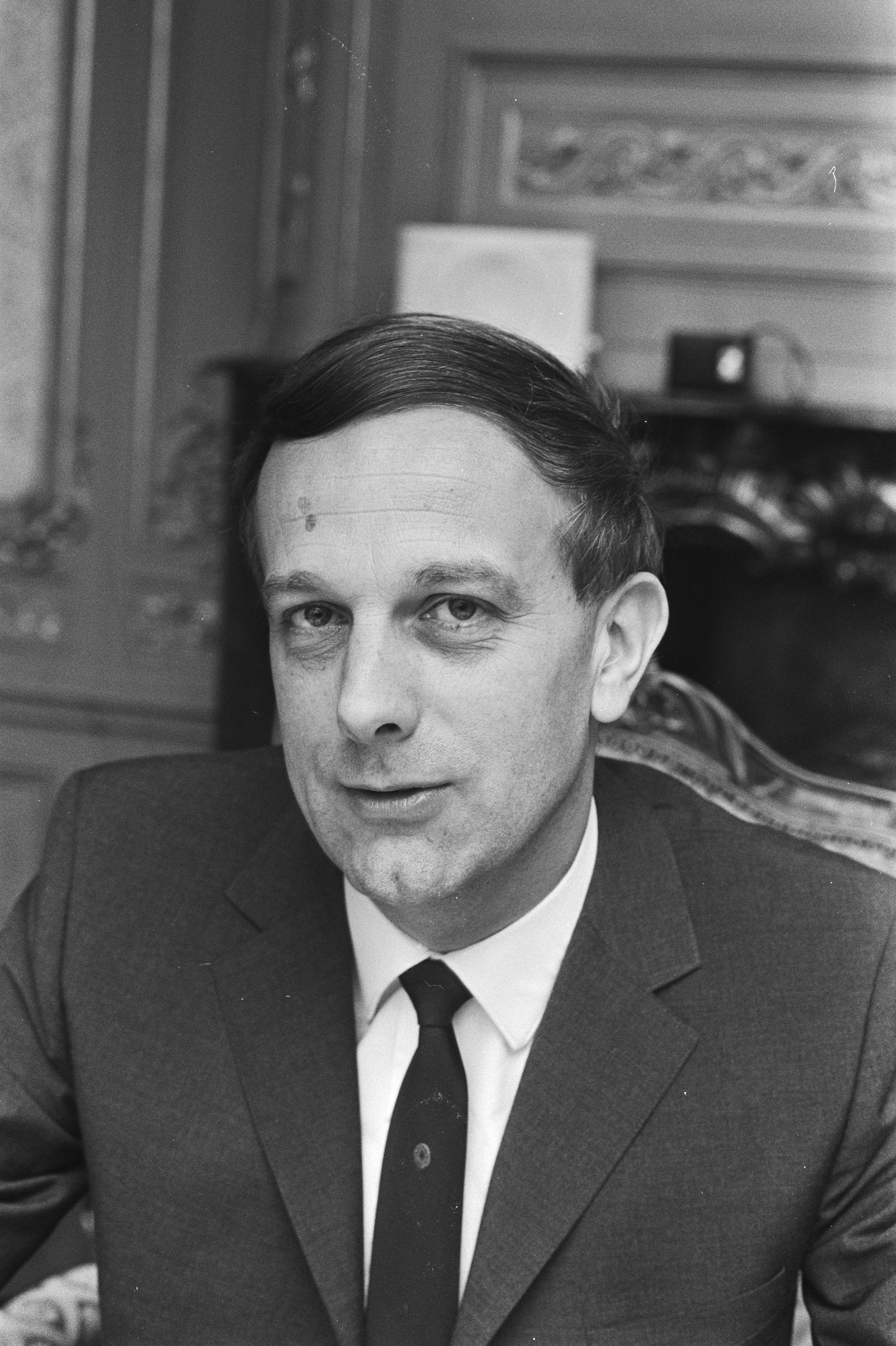
- Steenkamp in 1971

President of the Senate
- In office 13 September 1983 – 11 June 1991
- Preceded by: Theo Thurlings
- Succeeded by: Herman Tjeenk Willink

Chairman of the Christian Democratic Appeal
- In office 23 June 1973 – 11 October 1980
- Leader: Dries van Agt (1976–1980)
- Preceded by: Office established
- Succeeded by: Piet Bukman

Member of the Senate
- In office 22 June 1965 – 8 June 1999

Personal details
- Born: Petrus Antonius Josephus Maria Steenkamp; 8 March 1925 Uithoorn, Netherlands
- Died: 8 January 2016 (aged 90) Eindhoven, Netherlands
- Party: Christian Democratic Appeal (from 1980)
- Other political affiliations: Catholic People's Party (until 1980)
- Spouse(s): Constance Nolet (m. 1950–2008; her death)
- Children: 3 sons
- Relatives: Joris Steenkamp (grandson)
- Education: Tilburg University (Bachelor of Economics, Master of Economics, Doctor of Philosophy)
- Occupation: Politician; Economist; Historian; Businessman; Corporate director; Professor

Petrus Antonius Josephus Maria "Piet" Steenkamp (8 March 1925 – 8 January 2016) was a Dutch politician of the Christian Democratic Appeal (CDA) party.

== Early and personal life ==
From 1949 to 1954, Steenkamp was a business economics employee in his father's factory, the N.V. Uithoornse Bacon en Conservenfabriek "De Hoorn". He was then a member of the board of directors of this company until 1 September 1966. He introduced the distribution of profits and employee participation in the plant.

His son Jan-Benedict is a renowned marketing scholar, author and distinguished professor of Marketing at University of North Carolina at Chapel Hill.

== Political career ==
He played an important role in the formation of the party and is therefore referred to as the father of the CDA. He was president of the Dutch Senate from 1983 to 1991. He was succeeded by Herman Tjeenk Willink.

== Death ==
He died in Eindhoven, North Brabant on 8 January 2016, 90 years old.

== Decorations ==
Honours
Ribbon bar	Honour	Country	Date	Comment
	Commander of the Order of the Netherlands Lion	Netherlands	24 August 1990	Elevated from Knight (30 October 1976)
	Commander of the Order of Oranje-Nassau	Netherlands	29 April 1985	

Party political offices
New political party	Chairman of the Christian Democratic Appeal; 1973–1980	Succeeded by Piet Bukman
Political offices
Preceded by Theo Thurlings	President of the Senate; 1983–1991	Succeeded by Herman Tjeenk Willink
Honorary titles
New title	Honorary Chairman of the Christian Democratic Appeal; 1980–2016	Title abolished
