= René Paas =

Dutch politician

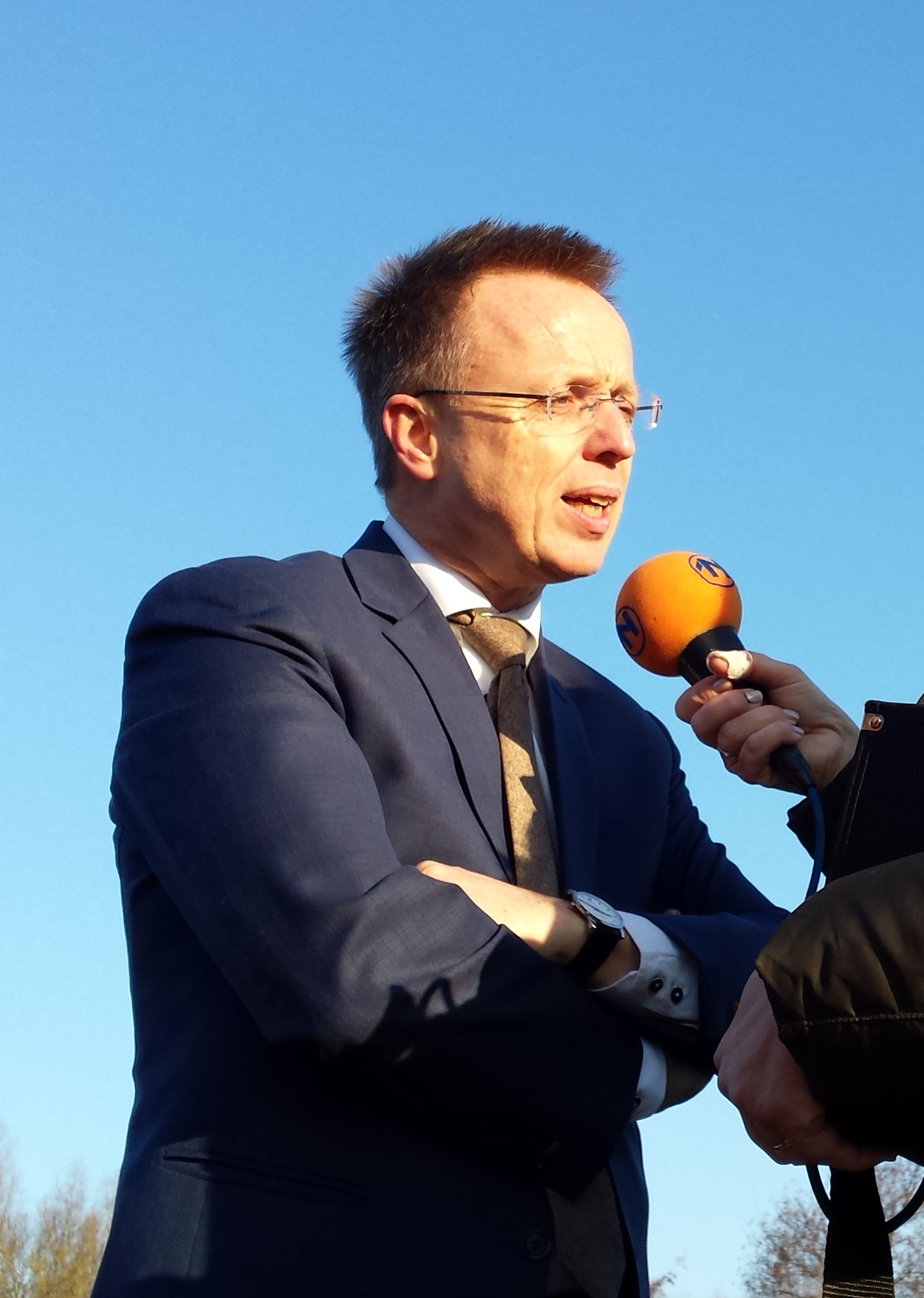

King's Commissioner in Groningen
- Incumbent
- Assumed office 18 April 2016
- Monarch: Willem-Alexander
- Preceded by: Max van den Berg

Personal details
- Born: Frederik Johannes Paas; 16 September 1966 (age 60) Dordrecht, Netherlands
- Party: Christian Democratic Appeal
- Spouse: Ruth Peetoom
- Children: 3
- Education: University of Groningen

Frederik Johannes "René" Paas (Dutch pronunciation: [ˈfreːdərɪk joːˈɦɑnəs rəˈneː ˈpaːs]; born 16 September 1966) is a Dutch politician of the Christian Democratic Appeal. He was chairman of the Christelijk Nationaal Vakverbond from 2005 to 2009. He has been the King's Commissioner in the province of Groningen since 18 April 2016.

== Early life ==
Frederik Johannes Paas was born on 16 September 1966 in Dordrecht in the Netherlands. He lived in Veendam and Nieuwe Pekela during his youth. He later moved to Groningen, where he studied Dutch law and public administration at the University of Groningen from 1984 to 1991. During his studies, he was an active member of the Christian Democratic Youth Appeal (CDJA), the youth organisation of the political party Christian Democratic Appeal (CDA).

== Career ==
René Paas was a member of the Groningen municipal council for the Christian Democratic Appeal (CDA) from 1990 to 1996 and an alderman (wethouder) from 1996 to 2005.

Paas was chairman of the Christelijk Nationaal Vakverbond (National Federation of Christian Trade Unions in the Netherlands) from 2005 to 2009. He has been chairman of Divosa, an association for managers in the social domain, since 2009.

Paas has been the King's Commissioner in the province of Groningen since 18 April 2016.

== Personal life ==
René Paas is married to Protestant minister and CDA party chair Ruth Peetoom. They have three children and live in Utrecht.

Political offices
Preceded by Max van den Berg	King's Commissioner of Groningen; 2016–present	Incumbent
