= Kunduz coalition =

The Kunduz coalition is a name used for the ad-hoc majority coalition of five parties in the Dutch House of Representatives which was sometimes used when the minority Rutte government could not rely on the support of the Freedom Party in 2011-2012. It consisted of the government parties CDA and VVD, together with the opposition parties Christen Unie, Groen Links and D'66. It totalled 77 seats of the 150 total.

The coalition was formed in 2011, during the debates about the Kunduz police mission - the three opposition parties collaborated in their negotiations with the minority government and negotiated conditions on which the plan would go through. The same majority was used in April 2012 when the government collapsed after it failed to reach agreement with the Freedom Party after seven weeks of negotiations on budget cuts for 2013. After three days of negotiating, the three parties and government were able to reach agreement on a budget in time for a European Commission deadline.
