= Henk Bleker =

Dutch politician and jurist

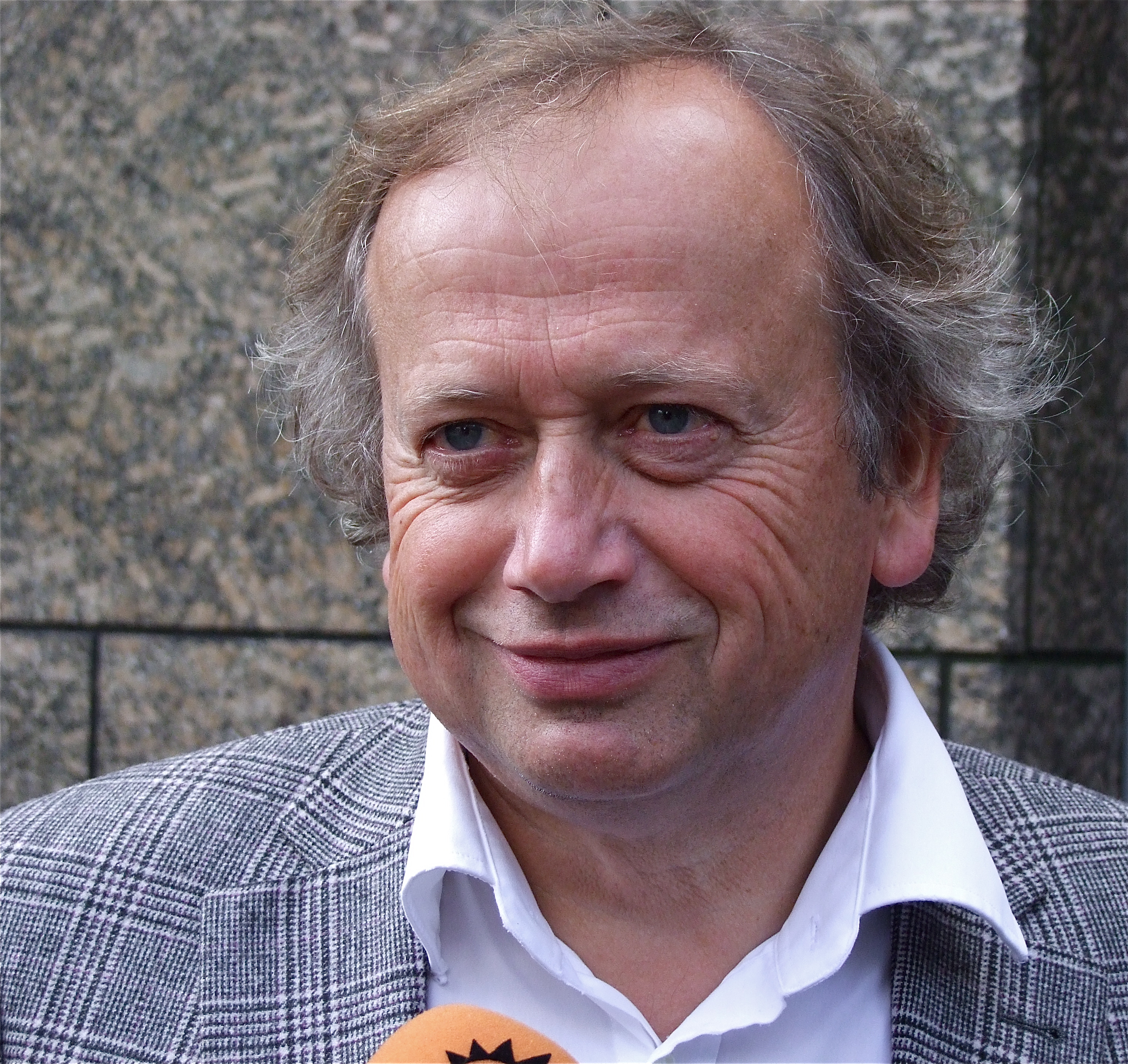
- Bleker in 2010

State Secretary for Economic Affairs, Agriculture and Innovation
- In office 14 October 2010 – 5 November 2012
- Prime Minister: Mark Rutte
- Preceded by: Frank Heemskerk
- Succeeded by: Co Verdaas

Chairman of the Christian Democratic Appeal
- In office 10 June 2010 – 14 October 2010; Ad interim
- Leader: Maxime Verhagen
- Preceded by: Peter van Heeswijk
- Succeeded by: Liesbeth Spies

Personal details
- Born: Hinderk Bleker; 26 July 1953 (age 73) Onstwedde, Netherlands
- Party: Forum for Democracy (from 2021)
- Other political affiliations: Anti-Revolutionary Party (until 1980); Christian Democratic Appeal (from 1980 until 2021)
- Spouse: Barbara Rijlaarsdam (m. 2015)
- Children: 2 sons and 1 daughter (first marriage); 1 daughter (second marriage)
- Education: Vrije Universiteit Amsterdam (Bachelor of Social Science, Master of Social Science); University of Groningen (Bachelor of Laws, Master of Laws, Doctor of Philosophy)
- Occupation: Politician · Civil servant · Jurist · Researcher · Management consultant · Media administrator · Corporate director · Nonprofit director

Hinderk "Henk" Bleker (born 26 July 1953) is a retired Dutch politician and jurist who served as State Secretary for Economic Affairs, Agriculture and Innovation in the First Rutte cabinet from 14 October 2010 to 5 November 2012. A member of the Christian Democratic Appeal (CDA), he previously was party chair from 20 June 2010 until 14 October 2010.

== Decorations ==
Honours
Ribbon bar	Honour	Country	Date	Comment
	Knight of the Order of Orange-Nassau	Netherlands	7 December 2012	

Party political offices
Preceded by Peter van Heeswijk	Chairman of the Christian Democratic Appeal; Ad interim 2010	Succeeded by Liesbeth Spies
Political offices
Preceded by Frank Heemskerk as State Secretary for Economic Affairs	State Secretary for Economic Affairs, Agriculture and Innovation; 2010–2012	Succeeded by Co Verdaas as State Secretary for Economic Affairs
Non-profit organization positions
Unknown	Executive Director of RTV Noord; 2009–2010	Unknown
