= Sybrand van Haersma Buma =

Dutch politician (born 1965)

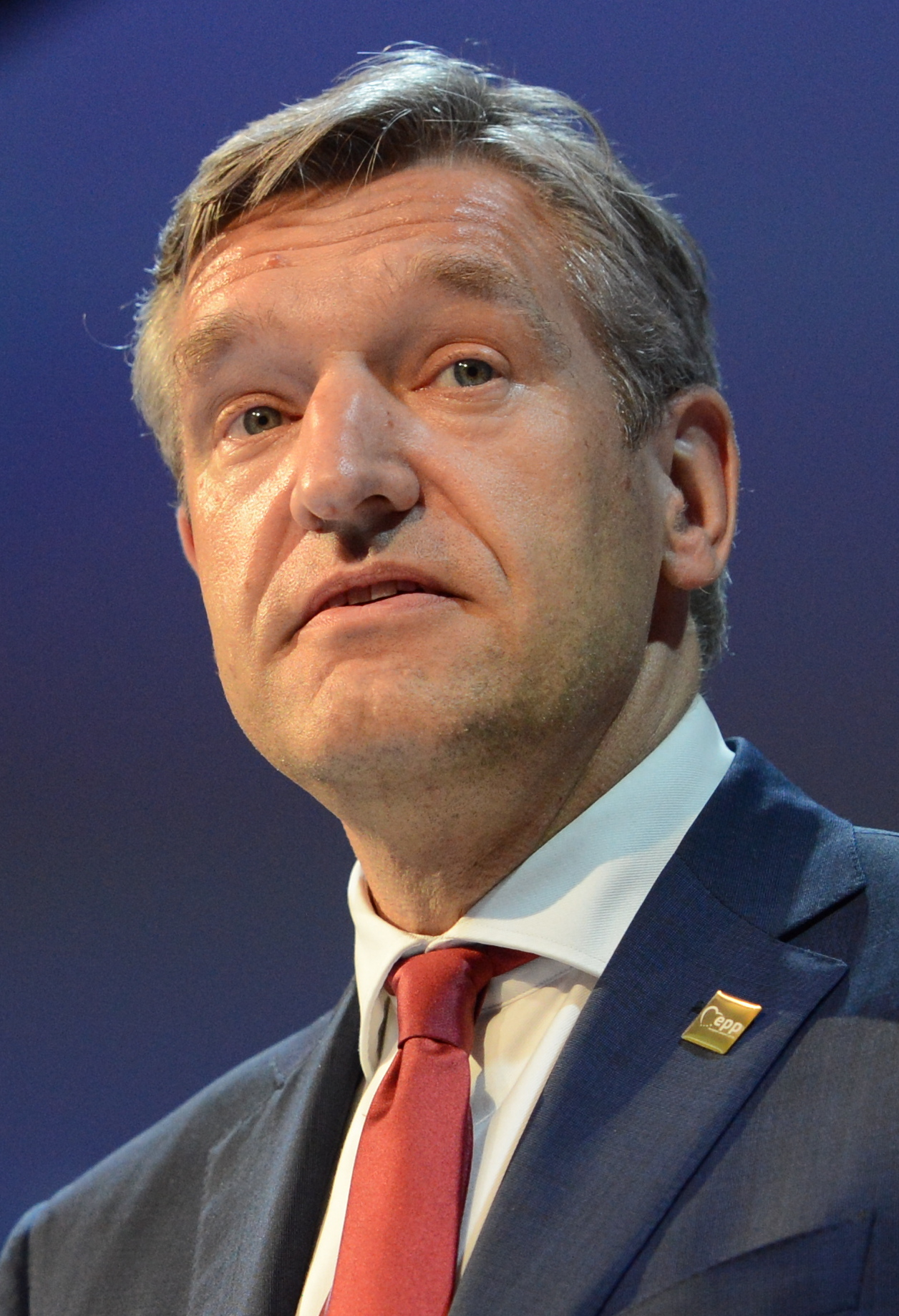

Vice-President of the Council of State
- Incumbent
- Assumed office 1 July 2026
- Monarch: Willem-Alexander
- Preceded by: Thom de Graaf

Mayor of Leeuwarden
- In office 26 August 2019 – 30 June 2026
- Preceded by: Ferd Crone
- Succeeded by: Foort van Oosten

Leader of the Christian Democratic Appeal
- In office 30 June 2012 – 22 May 2019
- Preceded by: Maxime Verhagen
- Succeeded by: Hugo de Jonge

Leader of the Christian Democratic Appeal in the House of Representatives
- In office 12 October 2010 – 21 May 2019
- Preceded by: Maxime Verhagen
- Succeeded by: Pieter Heerma

Member of the House of Representatives
- In office 23 May 2002 – 29 May 2019

Personal details
- Born: Sybrand van Haersma Buma; 30 July 1965 (age 61) Workum, Friesland, Netherlands
- Party: Christian Democratic Appeal
- Spouse: Marijke Geertsema
- Children: 2
- Education: University of Groningen (LLB, LLM); Sidney Sussex College, Cambridge (LLM)

Sybrand van Haersma Buma (Dutch: [ˈsibrɑnt fɑn ˈɦaːrsmaː ˈbymaː]; (Note: In isolation, van is pronounced [vɑn].) (Note: The family Van Haersma Buma is a branch of the old Frisian Buma dynasty, dating back to foremother Jouck Goris Buma, who married Wijbe Fennes in 1646. Bernhardus Buma (1770–1838) was burgomaster of Leeuwarden. His son, Wiardus Willem Buma married Maria de With (1803–1878), who was a daughter of Catharina van Haersma (1764–1824). When the Van Haersma family became extinct, their son Sijbrand Buma (1830–1886) bought the right to add the Van Haersma name to his own in 1870, starting the Van Haersma Buma branch of the Buma family (the other branch is the Hopperus Buma branch). Sybrand usually went by "Buma" in his public life.) West Frisian: [ˈsibrant fan ˈhɛrsma ˈbyma]; born 30 July 1965) is a Dutch politician who has served as Vice-President of the Council of State since 1 July 2026.

Prior to that, he was Mayor of Leeuwarden between 2019 and 2026. Until 2019, he was a member of the House of Representatives from 2002 who also served as the parliamentary leader of the Christian Democratic Appeal (CDA) from 2010 and as the leader of his party from 2012.

== Early life and education ==
Sybrand van Haersma Buma descends from an old patrician family from Friesland. He is the son of Bernard van Haersma Buma (1932–2020) who was Mayor of Workum (1962–1970) and of Sneek (1970–1993). His grandfather was Mayor of Stavoren. Both his father and grandfather belonged to the Christian Historical Union (CHU), that merged in 1980 with the Catholic People's Party (KVP) and the Anti-Revolutionary Party (ARP) to form the Christian Democratic Appeal (CDA).

Van Haersma Buma studied law at the University of Groningen (1983–1989) and followed a course at the Sidney Sussex College, Cambridge (1989–1990). After his study he was employed at the Council of State and the Ministry of the Interior.

== Political career ==
Van Haersma Buma was the secretary of the Christian Democratic Appeal in The Hague and a member of the executive committee of the Christian Democratic Appeal in the province of South Holland in the late 1990s. From January to June 2002 he was a member of the municipal council of Voorburg and since May 2002 he is a member of the Dutch House of Representatives. He became the party's spokesman on judicial affairs and is known for his law and order approach. From 2007 to 2010 he was the secretary of the Christian Democratic Appeal parliamentary group in the House of Representatives.

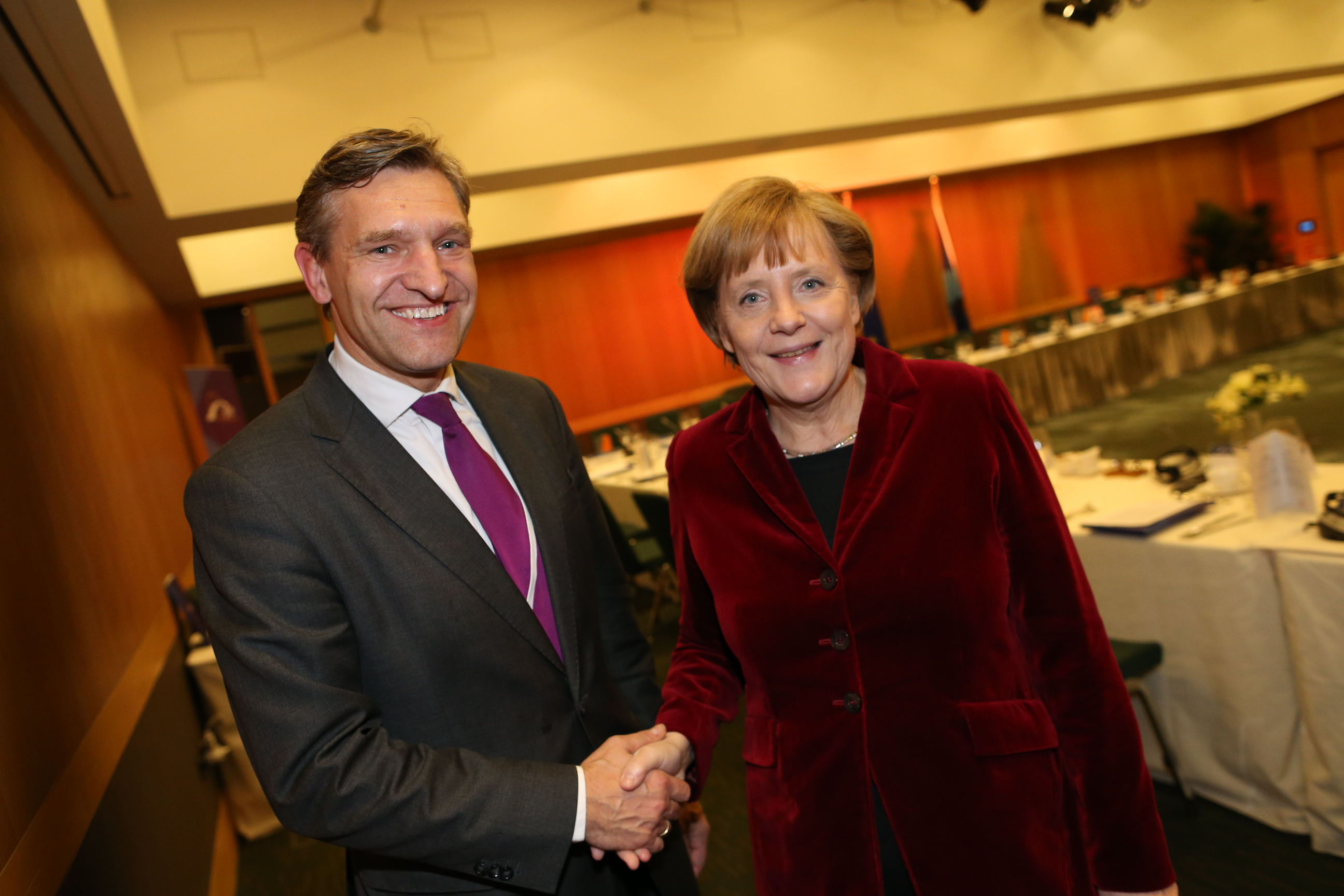
Sybrand van Haersma Buma and Chancellor of Germany Angela Merkel in 2014

Although the Christian Democratic Appeal lost the elections of June 2010, Van Haersma Buma was re-elected. He supported his party chief, Maxime Verhagen, during the negotiations between the Christian Democratic Appeal and the conservative liberal People's Party for Freedom and Democracy (VVD) of Mark Rutte and the populist Party for Freedom (PVV) of Geert Wilders which eventually resulted in a minority government of the VVD and Christian Democratic Appeal with parliamentary support of the PVV. After parliamentary leader Verhagen became Deputy Prime Minister in the new First Rutte cabinet Van Haersma Buma was elected as his successor.

After the fall of the cabinet, Van Haersma Buma criticised the PVV, the party responsible for the break-up of the cabinet. Shortly afterwards he announced his candidacy for the party's leadership. On 18 May 2012 he was elected as lead candidate of the Christian Democratic Appeal by a majority of the Christian Democratic Appeal members. In the meantime he and the leaders of the People's Party for Freedom and Democracy (VVD), the Christian Union (CU), the Democrats 66 and GroenLinks, the so-called Kunduz coalition (a budgetary agreement) for 2013.

After the 2017 Dutch general election, the CDA formed the Third Rutte cabinet alongside the VVD, D66 and CU. However Van Haersma Buma remained in the House of Representatives as parliamentary leader instead of entering the government.

Buma was nominated as Mayor of Leeuwarden by the city's municipal council on 16 May 2019. He was succeeded by Pieter Heerma as parliamentary leader in the House of Representatives on 21 May. On 26 August 2019 Buma was appointed Mayor of Leeuwarden.

== Notes ==
Party political offices
Preceded by Maxime Verhagen	Leader of the Christian Democratic Appeal in the House of Representatives; 2010–2019	Succeeded by Pieter Heerma
Preceded by Maxime Verhagen	Leader of the Christian Democratic Appeal; 2012–2019	Succeeded by Hugo de Jonge
Political offices
Preceded by Thom de Graaf	Vice-President of the Council of State; 2026–present	Incumbent
