= Liesbeth Spies =

Dutch politician (born 1966)

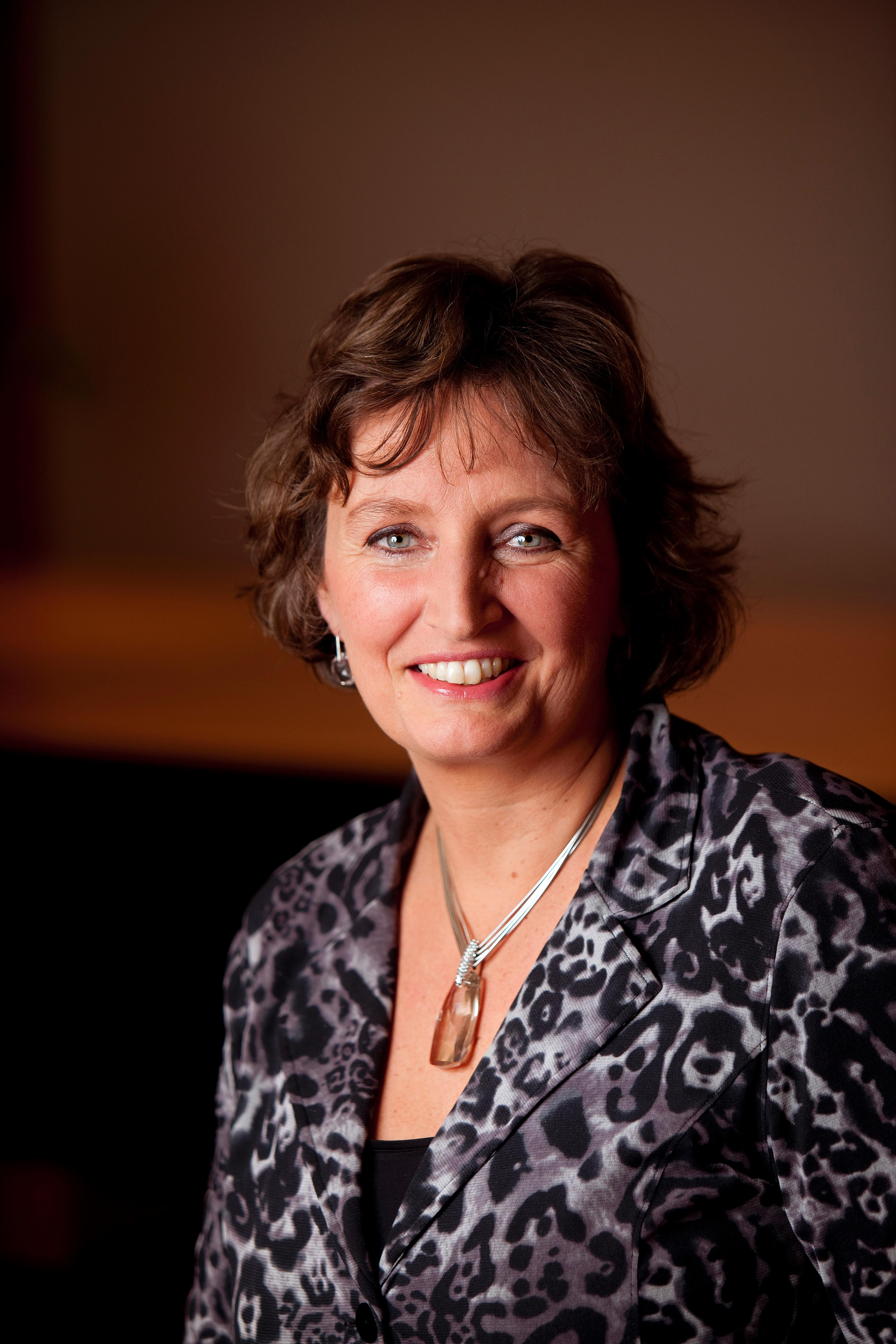
- Spies in 2012

Mayor of Alphen aan den Rijn
- Incumbent
- Assumed office 15 December 2014
- Preceded by: Tjerk Bruinsma (acting)

Mayor of Stichtse Vecht
- Acting
- In office 8 July 2014 – 15 December 2014
- Preceded by: Mirjam van 't Veld
- Succeeded by: Marc Witteman

Minister of the Interior and Kingdom Relations
- In office 16 December 2011 – 5 November 2012
- Prime Minister: Mark Rutte
- Preceded by: Piet Hein Donner
- Succeeded by: Ronald Plasterk

Chairwoman of the Christian Democratic Appeal
- In office 1 November 2010 – 2 April 2011
- Leader: Maxime Verhagen
- Preceded by: Henk Bleker (ad interim)
- Succeeded by: Ruth Peetoom

Member of the House of Representatives
- In office 23 May 2002 – 17 June 2010

Personal details
- Born: Jantje Wilhelmina Elisabeth Spies; 6 April 1966 (age 60) Alphen aan den Rijn, Netherlands
- Party: Christian Democratic Appeal (from 1984)
- Education: Leiden University
- Occupation: Politician · Civil servant · Jurist · Management consultant · Nonprofit director

Jantje Wilhelmina Elisabeth "Liesbeth" Spies (born 6 April 1966) is a Dutch politician and a member of the Christian Democratic Appeal (CDA). She has served as Mayor of Alphen aan den Rijn since 2014 and is due to step down in 2025 when she will become Chair of the Aedes association for housing corporations.

Spies gained her Law degree from the University of Leiden; she joined the CDA in 1984.

She served as Minister of the Interior and Kingdom Relations in the Cabinet Rutte I from 16 December 2011 to 5 November 2012. She was named to this post on 16 December 2011, following the appointment of her predecessor, Piet Hein Donner, to be the new Vice-President of the Council of State. She was a Member of the House of Representatives from 23 May 2002 to 17 June 2010 and served as acting Party Chair of the Christian Democratic Appeal from 1 November 2010 until 2 April 2011.

Following her departure from the House of Representatives she became the lead candidate for the CDA in the 2011 elections for the Provincial Council of South Holland. In the election the CDA lost over half its seats (going from thirteen seats to six) and went from largest party in the province to the fourth-largest when compared with the previous election in 2007. Despite this the CDA joined the coalition for the provincial government and Spies was appointed as a member of the provincial executive, with a portfolio including spatial planning and economic affairs. She vacated this position following her ministerial appointment.

From 8 July 2014, she was interim mayor of Stichtse Vecht.

As of 5 December 2014, Spies is mayor of her birthplace Alphen aan den Rijn. She is due to step down in 2025.

== Decorations ==
Honours
Ribbon bar	Honour	Country	Date	Comment
	Officer of the Order of Orange-Nassau	Netherlands	7 December 2012	

Party political offices
Preceded by Henk Bleker; Ad interim	Chairwoman of the Christian Democratic Appeal; 2010–2011	Succeeded by Ruth Peetoom
Political offices
Preceded by Piet Hein Donner	Minister of the Interior and Kingdom Relations; 2011–2012	Succeeded by Ronald Plasterk
Preceded by Mirjam van 't Veld	Mayor of Stichtse Vecht; Ad interim 2014	Succeeded by Marc Witteman
Preceded by Tjerk Bruinsma; Ad interim	Mayor of Alphen aan den Rijn; 2014–2025	Succeeded by Peter Rehwinkel
Non-profit organization positions
Preceded by Maria van der Hoeven	Chairwoman of the Dutch Alzheimer's Foundation; 2013–present	Incumbent
Preceded by Arno Brok	Chairwoman of the Mayors association 2017–present	Incumbent
