= Madeleine van Toorenburg =

Dutch politician (born 1968)

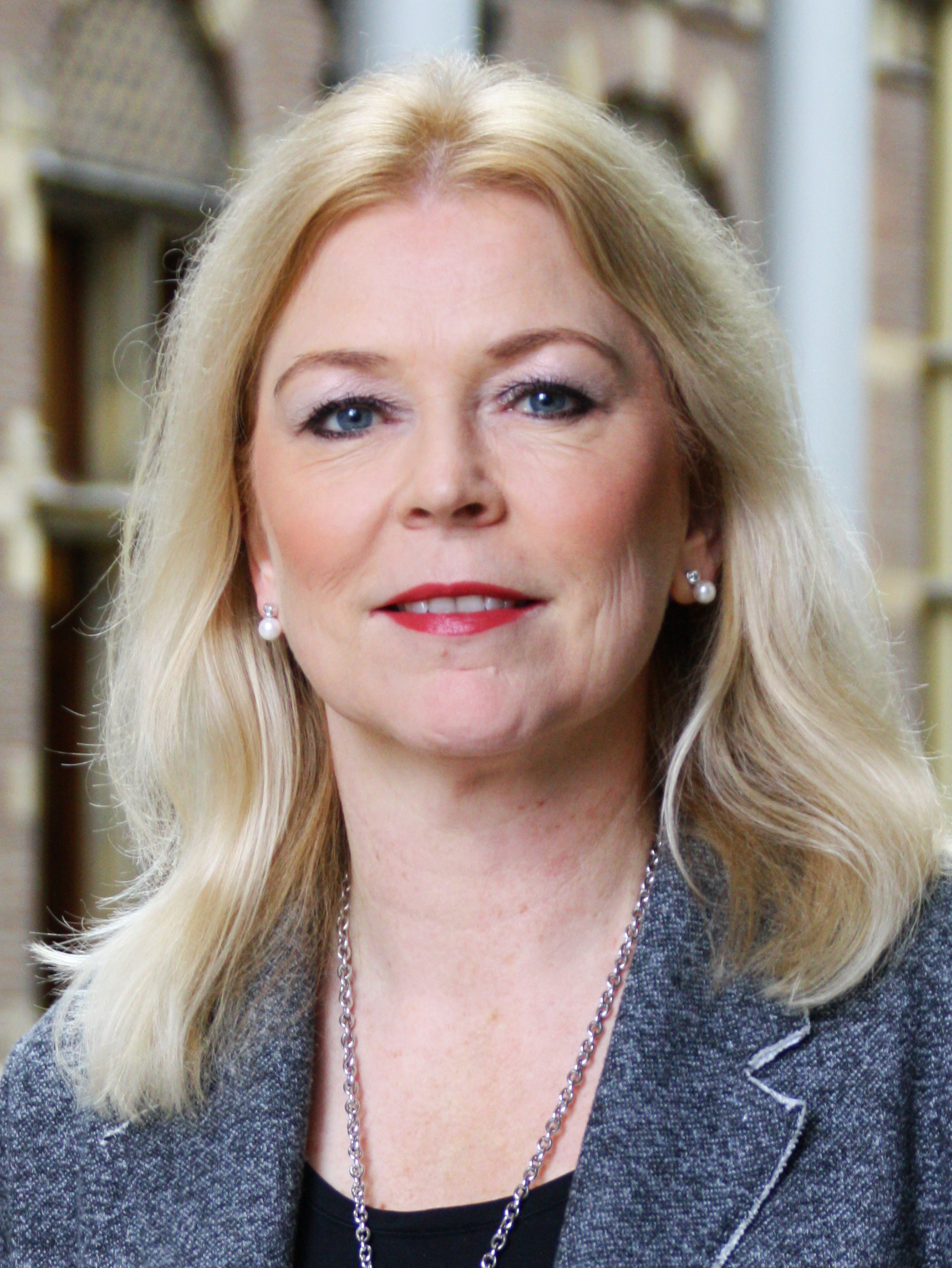

Member of the Senate
- Incumbent
- Assumed office 13 June 2023

Member of the House of Representatives
- In office 1 March 2007 – 31 March 2021

Personal details
- Born: Madeleine Melisande van Toorenburg; 10 May 1968 (age 58) The Hague, Netherlands
- Party: Christian Democratic Appeal
- Children: 2
- Education: Utrecht University; University of London; Tilburg University
- Occupation: Politician

Madeleine Melisande Ermens-van Toorenburg (born 10 May 1968) is a Dutch politician who has served as a member of the Senate for the Christian Democratic Appeal since 13 June 2023. She previously served as a member of the House of Representatives between 1 March 2007 and 31 March 2021, where she focused on matters of judiciary and other judicial affairs. On 2 February 2024, Van Thorenburg was appointed acting mayor of Nuenen, Gerwen en Nederwetten, replacing Maarten Huben.

== Personal life ==
Van Toorenburg was born in The Hague and raised in Maarn and Klimmen. She is married and has two daughters.

== Honours ==
- Knight of the Order of Orange Nassau (30 March 2021)
