= Maxime Verhagen =

Dutch politician (born 1956)

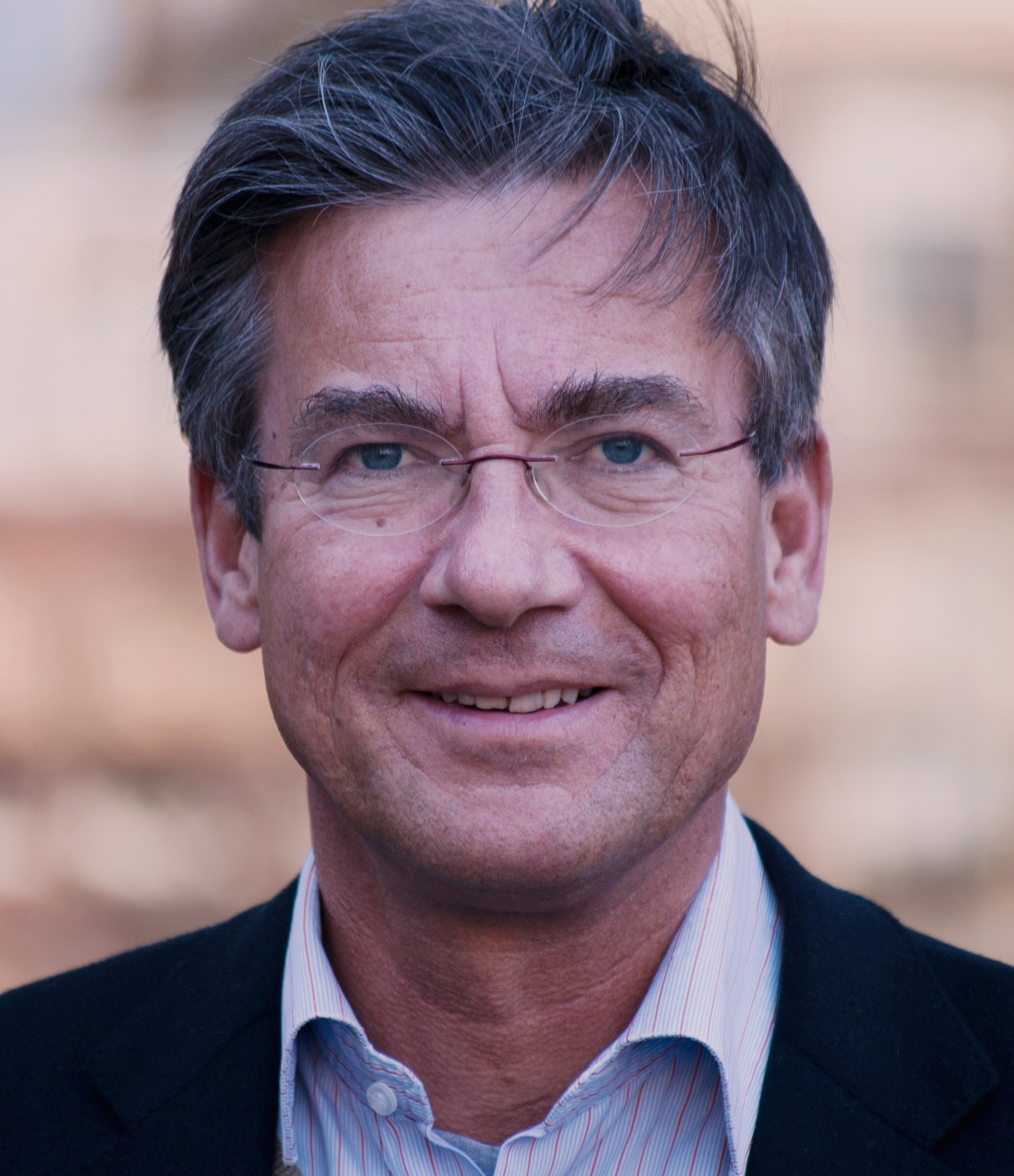
- Verhagen in 2012

Deputy Prime Minister of the Netherlands
- In office 14 October 2010 – 5 November 2012
- Prime Minister: Mark Rutte
- Preceded by: André Rouvoet
- Succeeded by: Lodewijk Asscher

Minister of Economic Affairs, Agriculture and Innovation
- In office 14 October 2010 – 5 November 2012
- Prime Minister: Mark Rutte
- Preceded by: Maria van der Hoeven (Economic Affairs); Gerda Verburg (Agriculture)
- Succeeded by: Henk Kamp (Economic Affairs)

Leader of the Christian Democratic Appeal
- In office 9 June 2010 – 30 June 2012
- Preceded by: Jan Peter Balkenende
- Succeeded by: Sybrand van Haersma Buma

Minister for Development Cooperation
- In office 23 February 2010 – 14 October 2010
- Prime Minister: Jan Peter Balkenende
- Preceded by: Bert Koenders
- Succeeded by: Lilianne Ploumen (Foreign Trade and Development Cooperation, 2012)

Minister of Foreign Affairs
- In office 22 February 2007 – 14 October 2010
- Prime Minister: Jan Peter Balkenende
- Preceded by: Ben Bot
- Succeeded by: Uri Rosenthal

Leader of the Christian Democratic Appeal in the House of Representatives
- In office 17 June 2010 – 14 October 2010
- Preceded by: Pieter van Geel
- Succeeded by: Sybrand van Haersma Buma
- In office 9 February 2007 – 22 February 2007
- Preceded by: Jan Peter Balkenende
- Succeeded by: Pieter van Geel
- In office 21 May 2003 – 30 November 2006
- Preceded by: Jan Peter Balkenende
- Succeeded by: Jan Peter Balkenende
- In office 11 July 2002 – 30 January 2003
- Preceded by: Jan Peter Balkenende
- Succeeded by: Jan Peter Balkenende

Member of the House of Representatives
- In office 17 June 2010 – 14 October 2010
- In office 17 May 1994 – 22 February 2007

Member of the European Parliament for the Netherlands
- In office 25 July 1989 – 19 July 1994

Personal details
- Born: Maxime Jacques Marcel Verhagen; 14 September 1956 (age 70) Maastricht, Netherlands
- Party: Christian Democratic Appeal (1976–present)
- Spouse: Annemieke Beijlevelt (m. 1984)
- Children: 3
- Education: Leiden University (BA, MA)

Maxime Jacques Marcel Verhagen (Dutch pronunciation: [mɑkˈsim ʑɑk mɑrˈsɛl vərˈɦaːɣə(n)]; born 14 September 1956) is a retired Dutch politician and historian. A member of the Christian Democratic Appeal (CDA), he served as Deputy Prime Minister of the Netherlands from 2010 to 2012 under Prime Minister Mark Rutte.

A native of Maastricht, Verhagen studied contemporary history at Leiden University, obtaining a Master of Arts degree. Verhagen worked as a political consultant and campaign manager for the Christian Democratic Appeal from February 1986 until July 1989. In the European parliamentary election of 1989 Verhagen was elected a Member of the European Parliament. In the election of 1994 Verhagen was elected as a Member of the House of Representatives, serving as a frontbencher and the party spokesperson for Foreign and European Affairs. After the election of 2002 party leader and parliamentary leader Jan Peter Balkenende became Prime Minister and Verhagen was selected as his successor as parliamentary leader on 11 July 2002. After the election of 2003 Verhagen continued as parliamentary leader. Following the election of 2006 Verhagen was appointed as Minister of Foreign Affairs in the Cabinet Balkenende IV, taking office on 22 February 2007. The Cabinet Balkenende IV fell exactly 3 years into its term and Verhagen took over as Minister for Development Cooperation on 23 February 2010. Shortly after the election of 2010 Balkenende announced he was stepping down as party leader and Verhagen was anonymously selected as his successor on 9 June 2010.

After the election Verhagen returned to the House of Representatives as Parliamentary leader on 17 June 2010 and following a successful cabinet formation with Liberal Leader Mark Rutte formed the Cabinet Rutte I with Verhagen appointed as Deputy Prime Minister and Minister of Economic Affairs, Agriculture and Innovation taking office on 14 October 2010. The Cabinet Rutte I fell 18 months into its term and shortly thereafter Verhagen unexpectedly announced his retirement and that he wouldn't stand for the election of 2012.

Verhagen retired from active politics at 56 and became active in the private and public sectors as a corporate and non-profit director, and works as a trade association executive serving as Chairman of the Construction association since July 2013 and became a Member of the Social and Economic Council for the Industry and Employers confederation (VNO-NCW) in October 2015.

== Early life and education ==
Maxime Jacques Marcel Verhagen was born on 14 September 1956 in Maastricht in the Netherlands Province of Limburg in a Roman Catholic family. He studied at Leiden University where he obtained a Master of Arts degree in History in 1986. For a brief period during his college years, Verhagen was associated with both left-wing radicalism and the liberal People's Party for Freedom and Democracy (VVD). He joined the CDA in 1976.

== Politics ==
Verhagen started working for the CDA and was elected to the city council of Oegstgeest, and then elected as a Member of the European Parliament for the European People's Party after the European Parliament election of 1989. After the general election of 1994, he was elected to the House of Representatives of the Netherlands. On 11 July 2002 he became CDA parliamentary leader in the House of Representatives. After became Minister of Foreign Affairs in the fourth Balkenende cabinet in 2007, he was succeeded in that position by Pieter van Geel. After the resignation of the Labour Party ministers, he became interim Minister for Development Cooperation.

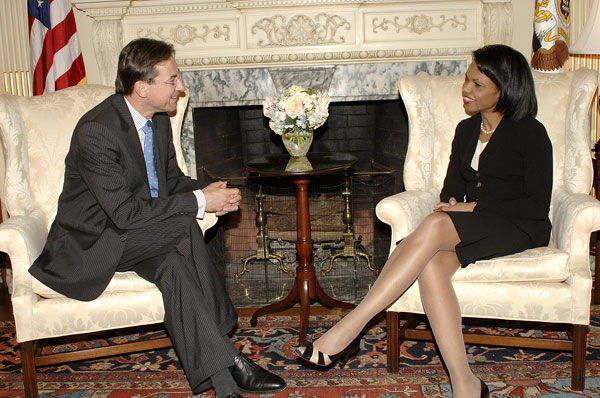
Minister Maxime Verhagen and United States Secretary of State Condoleezza Rice at the Harry S Truman Building on 2 April 2007.

When the Leader of the Christian Democratic Appeal and Parliamentary leader in the House of Representatives Jan Peter Balkenende became Prime Minister Verhagen succeed him as the Parliamentary leader in the House of Representatives on 11 July 2002. During the Cabinets Balkenende I, II en III Verhagen became the unofficial Deputy leader of the Christian Democratic Appeal.

He became the Minister of Foreign Affairs in the Cabinet Balkenende IV serving from 22 February 2007 to 14 October 2010, while he also served as Minister for Development Cooperation following the resignation from Bert Koenders. As such, at the request of gay rights groups, Verhagen called upon the Nuncio to the Netherlands, Monsignor François Bacqué, to respond to accusations that the Roman Catholic Church opposed homosexual rights. He later expressed concern at the lifting of the excommunication of controversial bishop Richard Williamson, a member of the Society of Saint Pius X.

The Christian Democratic Appeal did badly in the general election of 2010, and the then Christian Democratic Appeal Party leader and Prime Minister, Jan Peter Balkenende, resigned the same day. Verhagen replaced him as leader of the Christian Democratic Appeal parliamentary party.

After the 2010 Dutch cabinet formation Verhagen became the Minister of Economic Affairs, Agriculture and Innovation and Deputy Prime Minister in the first Rutte cabinet. Verhagen resigned in November 2012, together with the rest of the cabinet.

== Other activities ==
- European Bank for Reconstruction and Development (EBRD), Ex-Officio Alternate Member of the Board of Governors (2007-2010)

== Controversy ==
In 2021, Dutch newspaper de Volkskrant published about an integrity case study in which Maxime Verhagen was involved. Verhagen had been paid by the Province of Limburg to negotiate with industrial company VDL Groep as an 'ambassador' of the Province of Limburg. At the same time, Verhagen was on VDL Groep's payroll as an advisor. Verhagen was subsequently fired by the Province of Limburg.

== Personal ==
Verhagen is married to Annemieke Beijlevelt since 1984 and has 2 sons and 1 daughter. They live in Voorburg.

== Decorations ==
Honours
Ribbon bar	Honour	Country	Date	Comment
	Grand Officer of the Order of Bernardo O'Higgins	Chile	2007	
	Decoration of Merit in Gold	Netherlands	15 October 2010	
	Officer of the Order of Orange-Nassau	Netherlands	7 December 2012	

Party political offices
Preceded by Jan Peter Balkenende	Leader of the Christian Democratic Appeal in the House of Representatives; 2002–2003	Succeeded by Jan Peter Balkenende
Preceded by Jan Peter Balkenende	Leader of the Christian Democratic Appeal in the House of Representatives; 2003–2006	Succeeded by Jan Peter Balkenende
Preceded by Jan Peter Balkenende	Leader of the Christian Democratic Appeal in the House of Representatives; 2007	Succeeded by Pieter van Geel
Preceded by Jan Peter Balkenende	Leader of the Christian Democratic Appeal; 2010–2012	Succeeded by Sybrand van Haersma Buma
Preceded by Pieter van Geel	Leader of the Christian Democratic Appeal in the House of Representatives; 2010	Succeeded by Sybrand van Haersma Buma
Political offices
Preceded by Ben Bot	Minister of Foreign Affairs; 2007–2010	Succeeded by Uri Rosenthal
Preceded by Bert Koenders	Minister for Development Cooperation; 2010	Vacant Title next held by Lilianne Ploumen; 2012 as Minister for Foreign Trade and Development Cooperation
Preceded by André Rouvoet	Deputy Prime Minister of the Netherlands; 2010–2012	Succeeded by Lodewijk Asscher
Preceded by Maria van der Hoeven as Minister of Economic Affairs	Minister of Economic Affairs, Agriculture and Innovation; 2010–2012	Succeeded by Henk Kamp as Minister of Economic Affairs
Preceded by Gerda Verburg as Minister of Agriculture, Nature and Food Quality	Minister of Economic Affairs, Agriculture and Innovation; 2010–2012	Succeeded by Henk Kamp as Minister of Economic Affairs
