= Ruth Peetoom =

Dutch politician

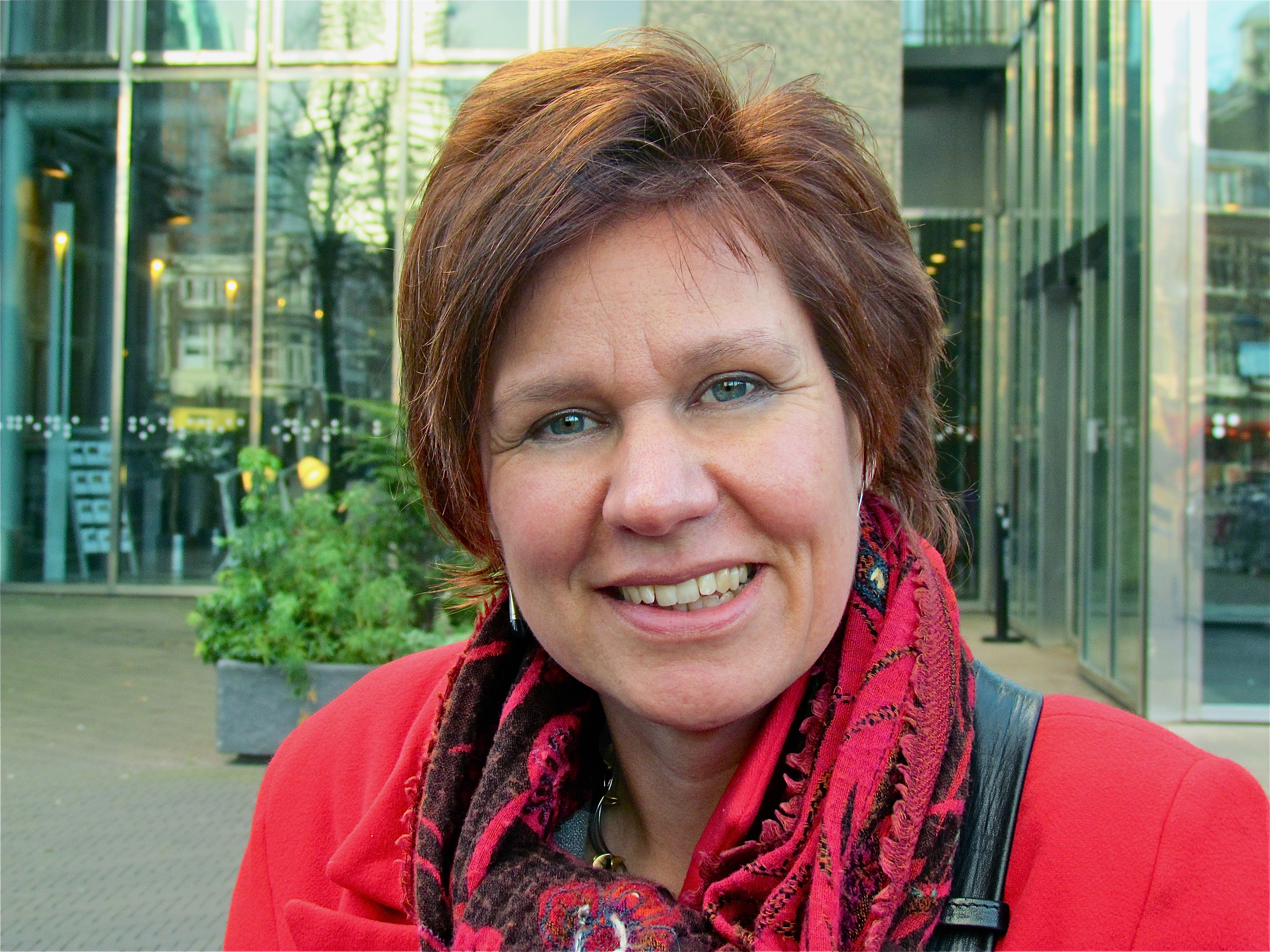

Party chair of the Christian Democratic Appeal
- In office 2 April 2011 – 9 February 2019
- Preceded by: Liesbeth Spies

Personal details
- Born: Gerhardine Ruth Peetoom; 25 July 1967 (age 59) Breda, Netherlands
- Party: Christian Democratic Appeal
- Spouse: René Paas
- Education: Vrije Universiteit (M.A., Theology, Ethics)
- Occupation: Politician; Minister

Gerhardine Ruth Peetoom (born 25 July 1967) is a Dutch politician of the Christian Democratic Appeal (CDA). She was the party chair of the Christian Democratic Appeal between 2 April 2011 and 9 February 2019.

== Biography ==
Peetoom is born in the province of North Brabant and grew up in the eastern part of the province of Groningen. She studied theology and ethics at the Vrije Universiteit in Amsterdam. Being a preacher of the Protestant Church in the Netherlands (PKN), she has been employed at the St. Nicholaschurch (Nicolaïkerk) in Utrecht since 2006.

From 1999 to 2005 she was a CDA member of the States-Provincial of Groningen. In 2010 she was vice-chair of the Frissen Commission, which investigated the CDA's huge loss in the 2010 Dutch general election. In April 2011 she was elected Party Chair of the Christian Democratic Appeal with over 60% of votes.

Party political offices
| Preceded by Liesbeth Spies | Party chair of the Christian Democratic Appeal; 2011-2019 | Succeeded by Rutger Ploum |
