= Abraham van Karnebeek =

Dutch politician (1836–1925)

His Excellency jhr. Abraham van Karnebeek
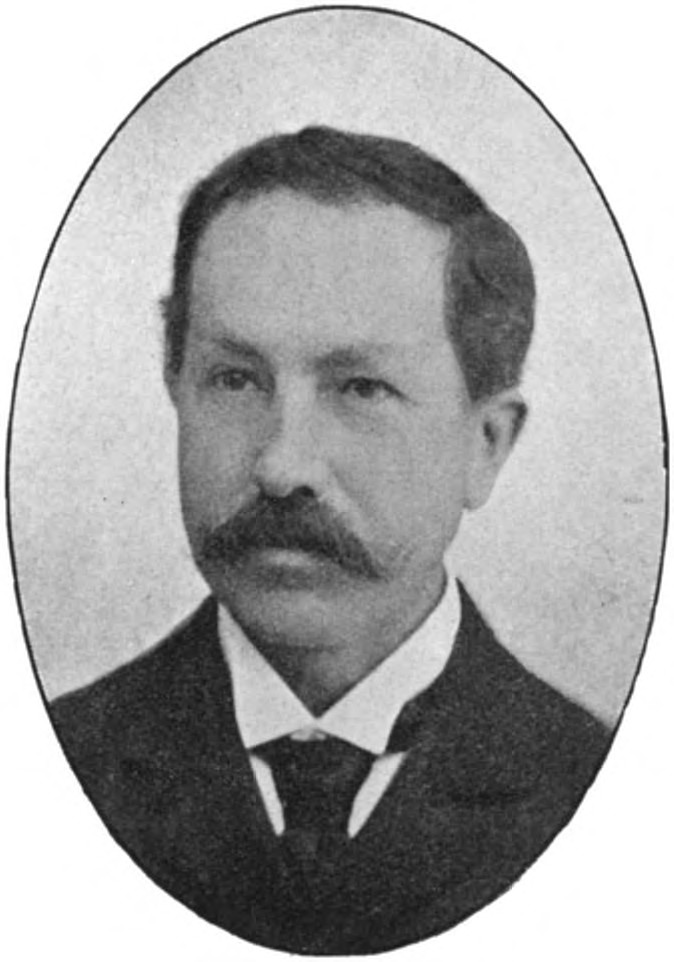
- Van Karnebeek in 1905

Minister of Foreign Affairs
- In office 1 November 1885 – 21 April 1888
- Prime Minister: Jan Heemskerk
- Preceded by: Marc Willem du Tour van Bellinchave
- Succeeded by: Cornelis Hartsen

King's commissioner of Zeeland
- In office 1 October 1879 – 16 June 1884
- Preceded by: Willem Six
- Succeeded by: Willem Maurits de Brauw

Member of the House of Representatives
- In office 19 June 1894 – 16 September 1914
- In office 3 March 1891 – 20 March 1894

Personal details
- Born: Abraham Pieter Cornelis van Karnebeek; 14 September 1836 Amsterdam, Netherlands
- Died: 9 October 1925 (aged 89) The Hague, Netherlands
- Party: Conservative liberal
- Spouse: Maria Petronella Rochussen (m. 1873)
- Children: 5, of which Herman Adriaan van Karnebeek
- Relatives: Jacob van Zuylen van Nijevelt (nephew)
- Occupation: Politician

Abraham Pieter Cornelis van Karnebeek (14 September 1836 – 9 October 1925) was a Dutch jurist, diplomat, and conservative liberal politician. He was Minister of Foreign Affairs from 1885 to 1888. In 1909 he was appointed the honorary title Minister of State.

== Career ==
After studying law in Utrecht which he concluded with a dissertation on international law, Van Karnebeek worked as a diplomat in Washington D.C., London, Berlin, and Paris from 1864. Van Karnebeek was a top official at the Ministry of Foreign Affairs from 1871 to 1876, after which he was a diplomat again in Stockholm. From 1879 to 1884 he was the King's Commissioner of the province of Zeeland. In the Jan Heemskerk cabinet (1885–1888), he was Minister of Foreign Affairs. From 1891, Van Karnebeek had a seat in the House of Representatives for the Rotterdam district and later for Utrecht. A highlight of his career was the organization (plus vice-chairmanship) of the first Hague Peace Conference in 1899. In 1904 Van Karnebeek became chairman of the Carnegie Foundation and thus prepared the arrival of the Peace Palace. Together with Tobias Asser, he campaigned for the establishment of the Hague Academy of International Law, which was established in 1914. Van Karnebeek would remain chairman of the Carnegie Foundation until 1923.

== Activities ==
Van Karnebeek worked in interesting times. He was in Washington D.C. during the American Civil War. He experienced the Franco-Prussian War, the Paris Commune, and the unification of Germany. He was a top official at the Ministry of Foreign Affairs when the Netherlands recalled its ambassador to the Vatican despite fierce protests from Roman Catholics. He was a minister during the First Boer War, in which the Netherlands sided with South Africa. The 41-year colonial Aceh War was fought during his career. He also did considerable work on the Dutch constitutional revision of 1887.

The Van Karnebeekbron (transl. Van Karnebeek source), a monument in The Hague dating from 1915 that commemorates the establishment of the Peace Palace, is named after him.

== Personal life ==
Van Karnebeek was a member of the Van Karnebeek family. He was the son-in-law of Jan Jacob Rochussen, the nephew of Jacob van Zuylen van Nijevelt, and the father of Herman Adriaan van Karnebeek. All three of them, like him, were Ministers of State. In 1873, he married Maria Petronella Rochussen, his niece, with whom he had two sons and three daughters.
