= Conny Helder =

Dutch healthcare manager and politician

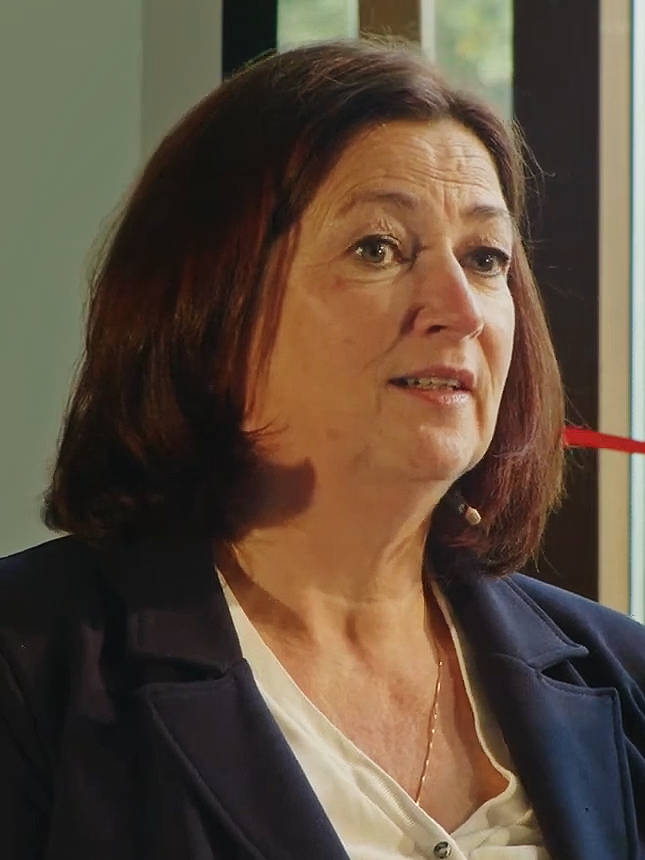
- Helder in 2022

Minister of Health, Welfare and Sport
- In office 10 January 2024 – 2 July 2024
- Prime Minister: Mark Rutte
- Preceded by: Ernst Kuipers
- Succeeded by: Fleur Agema

Minister for Long-term Care and Sport
- In office 10 January 2022 – 10 January 2024
- Prime Minister: Mark Rutte
- Preceded by: Tamara van Ark
- Succeeded by: Pia Dijkstra (Note: As minister responsible for the medical care portfolio, and minister without portfolio within the Ministry of Health, Welfare and Sport.)

Personal details
- Born: 27 November 1958 (age 67) The Hague, Netherlands
- Party: People's Party for Freedom and Democracy
- Children: 2
- Education: The Hague University of Applied Sciences; Leiden University
- Occupation: Healthcare manager; politician

Conny Helder (born 27 November 1958) is a Dutch healthcare manager, who served as the Minister for Long-term Care and Sport and, for a few months, as Minister of Health, Welfare and Sport in the fourth Rutte cabinet (2022–2024).

She was born in The Hague and trained to be a surgical assistant. She rose to managerial positions in hospitals and served as chair of the board of directors of an Eindhoven network of primary healthcare centers starting in 2010. Helder became director of tanteLouise, a major provider of elderly care in the Bergen op Zoom area, seven years later and was involved in a number of projects to renovate existing and construct new nursing homes. She also led a regional cooperation to promote innovations in the elderly care sector. tanteLouise was heavily affected by the COVID-19 pandemic, which reached the Netherlands in February 2020. Helder, who had become a board member of the trade association ActiZ the month before, made frequent media appearances to comment on the pandemic and to advocate the association's positions.

When the fourth Rutte cabinet was formed, Helder was asked to join as Minister for Long-term Care and Sport on behalf of the centre-right People's Party for Freedom and Democracy (VVD). She was sworn in on 10 January 2022 and proposed a plan to provide more elderly care at home rather than in nursing homes in reaction to the aging population of the Netherlands. She succeeded Ernst Kuipers as Minister of Health, Welfare and Sport in January 2024 following his resignation and served in that position until July 2024.

== Early life and healthcare career ==
Helder was born on 27 November 1958 in The Hague. She attended the secondary school Jan Campert Mavo in that city in the years 1971–74 and subsequently did havo and vwo at Thorbecke Lyceum. Helder applied to study medicine but was rejected because of a quota, and she started studying chemistry at Leiden University in 1978 instead. She dropped out the next year to follow a training at Bronovo and Westeinde, two The Hague hospitals, to become a surgical assistant. She completed it three years later and started working. Between 1986 and 1988, Helder also followed executive training in healthcare at The Hague University of Applied Sciences. She did another part-time study at Leiden University during this period in political science but did not finish it. Helder started filling managerial positions in hospitals, initially in The Hague and Amsterdam. In 2000, she became manager at the University Medical Center Utrecht's (UMCU) surgical division. She switched to the surgical specialties division of the same hospital four years later.

Helder left UMCU in July 2010 to become chair of the board of directors of the Eindhoven Corporation of Primary Health Care Centers (SGE). The organization operated ten centers in the city of Eindhoven with general practitioners, pharmacists, physiotherapists, and psychologists, among others. It was suffering from a €1.6 million operating deficit as well as a conflict between Helder's predecessor and healthcare professionals. Helder told upon her appointment that she wanted to expressly involve the latter group in important decisions. In 2015, under her leadership, SGE opened a new healthcare center in Strijp-S for expats living in Eindhoven after an evaluation had shown that many expats did not trust the Dutch healthcare system due to the relatively important role of general practitioners.

=== tanteLouise and COVID-19 pandemic ===
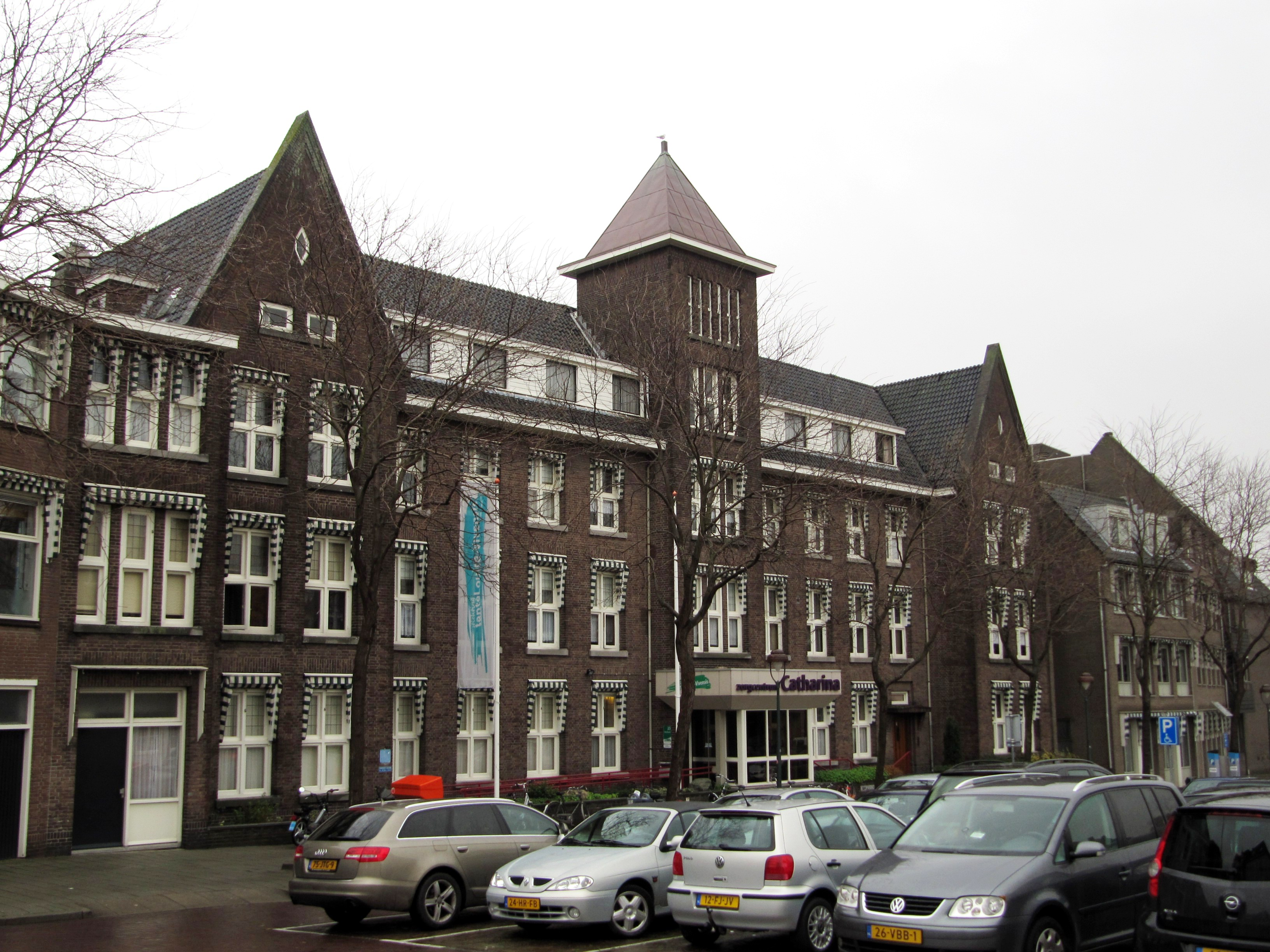
It was decided under Helder's leadership to demolish the main building of Huize St. Catharina in Bergen op Zoom to make room for a new development.

Helder started serving as director of tanteLouise, an elderly care provider active in Bergen op Zoom, Steenbergen, and Woensdrecht, in June 2017. Back then, the organization employed 1,800 people and took care of approximately 4,000 elderly people, including 1,100 in its approximately fifteen nursing homes. She wanted to improve the healthcare chain and to sign more longer-term agreements with health insurance companies and municipalities. The following year, one of its nursing homes in Steenbergen started experimenting with augmented reality glasses for medical diagnoses by remote specialists. Her tenure also saw the closing of some facilities, mostly older and smaller retirement homes, and the construction and renovation of others. To enable these changes, a temporary facility with close to 100 units was opened in 2019 on the grounds of mental institution Vrederust in Halsteren. Plans to tear down most of Huize St. Catharina in Bergen op Zoom in order to build a new facility faced some resistance due to the perceived historical value of the complex from 1929. However, the municipality decided against listing it as a heritage site, paving the way for its demolition. Helder became chair of the board of directors of the West-Brabant Care Innovation Center (CIC), a cooperation between local healthcare providers to promote innovations, in 2019. A few months before, a new nursing home of tanteLouise for dementia patients called Hof van Nassau had opened in Steenbergen, featuring several technological innovations such as GPS trackers to allow inhabitants to roam around more freely. It drew attention from the BBC, CCTV, and a delegation from Tsinghua University, and Helder joined Minister of Health, Welfare and Sport Hugo de Jonge on a working visit to China.

In January 2020, Helder joined the board of ActiZ, a national trade association representing about 400 elderly care providers. The first case of the coronavirus in the Netherlands was detected on 27 February, marking the start of the COVID-19 pandemic in the country. Together with other leaders of healthcare organizations in North Brabant, Helder established the Regionaal Overleg Niet Acute Zorg (RONAZ; Regional consultation of non-acute care) the following month. The body advised nursing homes to close their doors to visitors in order to mitigate the spread of the virus to this vulnerable group; Helder complied and did not allow any visitors starting on 16 March. The third Rutte cabinet made the measure mandatory three days later. The complete ban remained in place until 19 May, while Helder had called it no longer sustainable and inhumane a month earlier. Despite precautions, several nursing homes of tanteLouise experienced outbreaks of the coronavirus including Het Nieuwe ABG, where the army assisted and where 29 out of 168 inhabitants died in late 2020. Vaccinations started in the Netherlands in early January 2021, initially only at dedicated centers. A few weeks later – after the creation of smaller vaccine batches had been made possible – vaccinations commenced at nursing homes and disability care centers, and tanteLouise was chosen to be among twelve organizations that received the vaccines first as part of a pilot. On 1 March 2021, Helder, who used to be tanteLouise's sole director, was joined on the board of directors by two others. The supervisory board stated that the move was necessitated by increasingly complex elderly care, innovations, and major real estate projects.

Being a spokesperson for ActiZ and RONAZ, Helder often commented on the effects of the COVID-19 pandemic on nursing homes in the media, leading Brabants Dagblad to describe her as the face of elderly care during the pandemic. She drew attention to shortages in nursing homes of personal protective equipment at the start of the first wave of infections and of personnel in later stages, when many employees were absent after having contracted the virus. Helder also voiced the opinion that elderly care was initially overlooked in comparison to intensive care. After vaccines had become widely available, she defended ActiZ's position that elderly care facilities should have insight into the vaccination status of their employees. She said it would enable organizations to have discussions with teams with a low rate. Helder was among three people shortlisted in September 2020 for the title Topvrouw van het Jaar (Female leader of the year).

== Fourth Rutte cabinet ==
Helder became Minister for Long-term Care and Sport in January 2022 as part of the new fourth Rutte cabinet on behalf of the center-right People's Party for Freedom and Democracy (VVD). That party had won a plurality in the general election held in March 2021 and had formed a coalition with the centrist-progressive Democrats 66 (D66) party and the centrist-conservative Christian Democratic Appeal (CDA) and Christian Union (CU) parties. The cabinet was sworn in on 10 January by King Willem-Alexander at Noordeinde Palace. Helder is a minister without portfolio – meaning that she does not lead a ministry of her own – and her responsibilities are long-term care (elderly and disabled care), mental healthcare, district nursing care, personal health budget, quality policy, labor market policy, sport, coordination of accountability of the health ministry's COVID-19 policy, lawful care and good management, decreasing bureaucracy, and organizability/regionalization. She set herself the goal of "keeping healthcare qualitatively good while also keeping it affordable, accessible, and attractive".

=== Healthcare policy ===
Helder called the required growth in healthcare personnel due to an aging population unsustainable; the Scientific Council for Government Policy (WRR) had concluded that a quarter of the labor force would have to work in the healthcare and welfare sectors in 2040, up from one-sixth in 2021. Helder said that healthcare therefore had to be organized differently. She presented a plan in July 2022 called Wonen, Ondersteuning en Zorg voor Ouderen (WOZO; Living, support, and care for the elderly) to reform elderly care in the Netherlands by having the elderly live at home for a longer time as opposed to moving to a nursing home. Helder planned to achieve this goal through health care prevention, additional housing for the elderly, and technological innovations such as videotelephony and robots. The cabinet set aside €770 million for this purpose for the next five years. Helder accordingly abandoned the government's plans to add 50,000 nursing home spots by 2031 in favor of raising the capacity of total nursing care by the same number. She also launched a new program to spend €500 million per year to retain healthcare workers by increasing job satisfaction through innovation, education, development, and increased participation in decisions. The latter program was criticized by the Federation of Dutch Trade Unions (FNV) for not including plans for higher wages.

With her appointment as minister, Helder took over an investigation into a €100 million sale of imported face masks to the Ministry of Health, Welfare and Sport at the start of the COVID-19 pandemic by TV pundit and activist Sywert van Lienden and two accomplices. They claimed the deal was not-for-profit at a time when there was a shortage of personal protective equipment, but it was later discovered that it had earned them €20 million. When newspaper de Volkskrant reported in March 2022 that former health minister Hugo de Jonge had insisted that officials reach out to Van Lienden despite having earlier denied any involvement, a majority of the House of Representatives asked Helder for a statement of facts. She did not comply, citing the fact that the delayed investigation was still ongoing. Helder did release a number of documents related to De Jonge's involvement including a letter of his ahead of a debate. She admitted that De Jonge had asked for the release, and she apologized following criticism from opposition parties that she only informed the House at his request after initially refusing to do so. Helder decided to take legal action against Van Lienden's company in October 2023.

=== Sports ===
During the 2022 FIFA World Cup, the cabinet decided to send Helder to attend a match between the Netherlands and host country Qatar. The House of Representatives had earlier carried a motion not to send a government delegation due to the country's human rights record. Following calls to wear an armband of the anti-discrimination campaign OneLove, Helder was criticized for showing up with a much smaller pin instead. She also wore a scarf that read "Never mind", but she later mentioned this had been unintentional. In March 2023, Helder announced the government would establish an independent integrity center for abuse, doping, and match fixing in sports and that the Center for Safe Sports Netherlands (CVSN) would be transferred from NOC*NSF to the new body to increase its independence. The move followed a wave of allegations of inappropriate behavior in the sports world.

=== Demissionary cabinet ===
The fourth Rutte cabinet collapsed on 7 July 2023 due to disagreements over asylum reforms and continued as a demissionary cabinet. The House of Representatives subsequently declared the topic of budget cuts for elderly care controversial, meaning the cabinet could no longer make decisions on it. However, a €460-million planned spending reduction for 2024 had already been worked out by the ministry. The government finally announced that it would scrap half of the cut as part of its budget. Helder became acting Minister of Health, Welfare and Sport when Ernst Kuipers stepped down on 10 January 2024 to pursue an unspecified job. Her new position became permanent when Pia Dijkstra was sworn in on 2 February as Minister for Medical Care, a ministership without portfolio. Helder's term came to an end on 2 July 2024, when the Schoof cabinet was installed.

== Personal life ==
Helder has been living in 's-Hertogenbosch since the 1990s, and her partner is a general practitioner from that city. They have a son and a daughter, who were born around 2000.

== Notes ==
Political offices
Preceded by Tamara van Ark	Minister for Long-term Care and Sport; 2022–2024	Succeeded by Pia Dijkstra
Preceded by Ernst Kuipers	Minister of Health, Welfare and Sport; 2024	Succeeded by Fleur Agema
