= Jacob George Hieronymus van Tets van Goudriaan =

Dutch politician (1812–1885)

Jonkheer Jacob George Hieronymus van Tets van Goudriaan
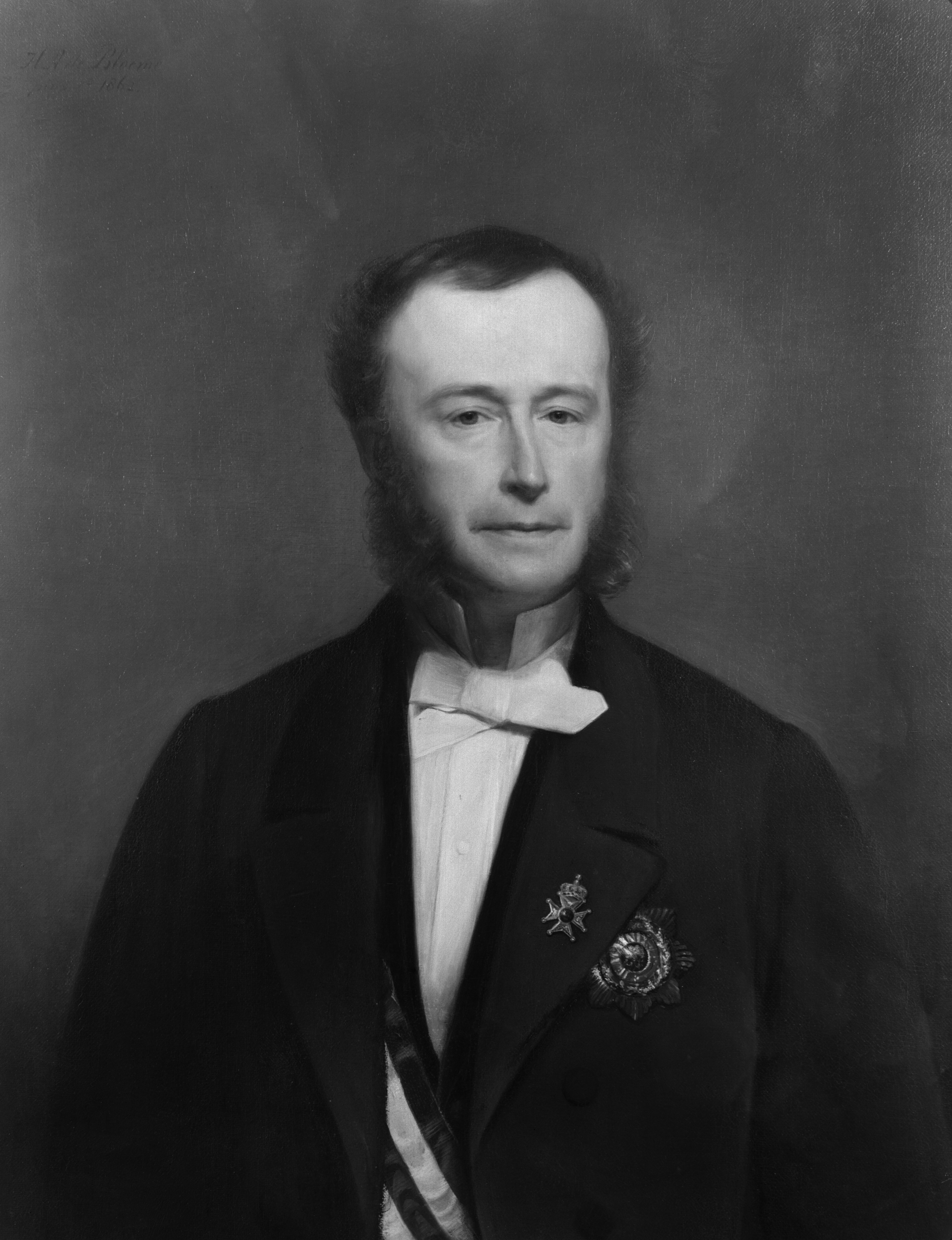

Minister of Finance
- In office 14 March 1861 – 31 January 1862
- Preceded by: Johannes Servaas Lotsy
- Succeeded by: Gerardus Henri Betz

Minister of the Interior
- In office 18 March 1858 – 23 February 1860
- Preceded by: Anthony Gerhard Alexander van Rappard
- Succeeded by: Schelto van Heemstra

King's commissioner of Zeeland
- In office 1 January 1853 – 18 March 1858
- Monarch: William III
- Preceded by: Ewout van Vredenburch
- Succeeded by: Schelto van Heemstra

Personal details
- Born: 7 December 1812 Haarlem, Netherlands
- Died: 14 March 1885 (aged 72) Nijmegen, Netherlands
- Spouse: Catharina Daniela van Slingelandt (m. 1843)

Jonkheer Jacob George Hieronymus van Tets van Goudriaan (7 December 1812 – 14 March 1885) was a Dutch politician who served as king's commissioner of Zeeland between 1853 and 1858, as interior minister between 1858 and 1860, and as finance minister between 1861 and 1862.
