= List of King's and Queen's commissioners of Zeeland =

List of regional leaders of a Dutch province

Coat of arms of Zeeland

This article is a list of King's and Queen's commissioners of the province of Zeeland, Netherlands. The King's commissioner is both the chairman of the Provincial Council of Zeeland as well as the provincial executive. Until 1850 the position was held by the provincial Governor.

== Governors of Zeeland (1814–1850) ==
Portrait	Name (Lifespan)	Term	Political party	Monarch
Portret van Jacob Hendrik Schorer (1760–1822)	Jacob Hendrik Schorer (1760–1822)	16 May 1814 – 18 September 1817 (3 years, 125 days)		William I (1815–1840)
Hendrik Jacob van Doorn van Westcapelle	Hendrik Jacob van Doorn van Westcapelle (1786–1853)	19 March 1818 – 1 December 1826 (8 years, 257 days) (Acting since 16 July 1817)	Independent (Ultra-conservative)	William I (1815–1840)
	Ewout van Vredenburch (1779–1861)	1 August 1826 – 1 August 1850 (24 years, 0 days)		William I (1815–1840)
	Ewout van Vredenburch (1779–1861)	1 August 1826 – 1 August 1850 (24 years, 0 days)		William II (1840–1849)

== King's and Queen's Commissioners of Zeeland (since 1850) ==
Portrait	Name (Lifespan)	Term	Political party	Monarch
	Ewout van Vredenburch (1779–1861)	1 August 1850 – 1 January 1853 (2 years, 153 days)		William III (1849–1890)
Jacob George Hieronymus van Tets, by Herman Antonie de Bloeme	Jacob George Hieronymus van Tets van Goudriaan (1812–1885)	1853 – 1858	Independent (Liberal)	William III (1849–1890)
Schelto van Heemstra	Schelto van Heemstra (1807–1864)	29 May 1858 – 2 March 1860 (1 year, 305 days)	Independent (Pragmatic liberal)	William III (1849–1890)
	Rudolph Willem van Lynden (1808–1876)	15 May 1860 – 19 April 1876 (15 years, 340 days)	Independent (Conservative liberal)	William III (1849–1890)
W. Six	Willem Six (1829–1908)	1 June 1876 – 20 August 1879 (3 years, 80 days)	Independent (Moderate liberal)	William III (1849–1890)
Abraham van Karnebeek (1905)	Abraham van Karnebeek (1836–1925)	1 October 1879 – 16 June 1884 (4 years, 259 days)	League of Free Liberals ("Old Liberal")	William III (1849–1890)
Willem Maurits de Brauw (1838–1898), 1858	Willem Maurits de Brauw (1838–1898)	16 June 1884 – 29 June 1897 (13 years, 13 days)	Independent (Conservative liberal)	William III (1849–1890)
Willem Maurits de Brauw (1838–1898), 1858	Willem Maurits de Brauw (1838–1898)	16 June 1884 – 29 June 1897 (13 years, 13 days)	Independent (Conservative liberal)	Wilhelmina (1890–1948)
1900, A.J. Roest	Albert Johan Roest (1837–1920)	1 July 1897 – 1 May 1906 (8 years, 304 days)	Independent ("Old liberal")	Wilhelmina (1890–1948)
Herman Jacob Dijckmeester (1847–1942)	Herman Jacob; Dijckmeester (1847–1942)	1 May 1906 – 1 May 1921 (15 years, 0 days)	Independent (Liberal)	Wilhelmina (1890–1948)
Johan Willem Quarles van Ufford	Johan Willem; Quarles van Ufford (1882–1952)	1 May 1921 – 12 September 1940 (19 years, 134 days)^{[Fired]}	Independent (Christian historical)	Wilhelmina (1890–1948)
Petrus Dieleman	Petrus Dieleman (1873–1961)	13 September 1940 – 6 November 1944 (4 years, 54 days); Acting	Anti-Revolutionary Party, since the surrender to Nazi-Germany, a sympathiser of National Socialism.	Wilhelmina (1890–1948)
Guus de Casembroot	Guus de Casembroot (1906–1965)	6 November 1944 – 15 November 1944 (9 days); Acting	Independent (Christian historical)	Wilhelmina (1890–1948)
Johan Willem Quarles van Ufford	Johan Willem; Quarles van Ufford (1882–1952)	15 November 1944 - 1 February 1948 (3 years, 78 days)^{[Honorably Discharged]}	Independent (Christian historical)	Wilhelmina (1890–1948)
Guus de Casembroot	Guus de Casembroot (1906–1965)	1 February 1948 – 10 February 1965 (17 years, 9 days)^{[Died in office]}	Independent (Christian historical)	Juliana (1948–1980)
Jan van Aartsen	Jan van Aartsen (1909–1992)	1 June 1965 – 1 October 1974 (9 years, 122 days)	Anti-Revolutionary Party	Juliana (1948–1980)
Kees Boertien	Kees Boertien (1927–2002)	16 January 1975 – 1 August 1992 (17 years, 198 days)	Anti-Revolutionary Party (1975–1980)	Juliana (1948–1980)
Kees Boertien	Kees Boertien (1927–2002)	16 January 1975 – 1 August 1992 (17 years, 198 days)	Christian; Democratic Appeal (1980–1992)	Beatrix (1980–2013)
	Wim van Gelder (born 1942)	16 September 1992 – 1 February 2007 (14 years, 138 days)	Christian; Democratic Appeal	Beatrix (1980–2013)
Karla Peijs	Karla Peijs (born 1944)	1 March 2007 – 1 March 2013 (6 years, 0 days)	Christian; Democratic Appeal	Beatrix (1980–2013)
Han Polman	Han Polman (born 1963)	1 March 2013 – 16 September 2024 (11 years, 199 days)	Democrats 66	Willem-Alexander since 2013)
Hugo de Jonge	Hugo de Jonge (born 1977)	16 September 2024 – Incumbent (1 year, 191 days)	Christian; Democratic Appeal	Willem-Alexander since 2013)

^{Honorably Discharged}
^{Fired}
^{Died in office}
