= Han Polman =

Dutch politician

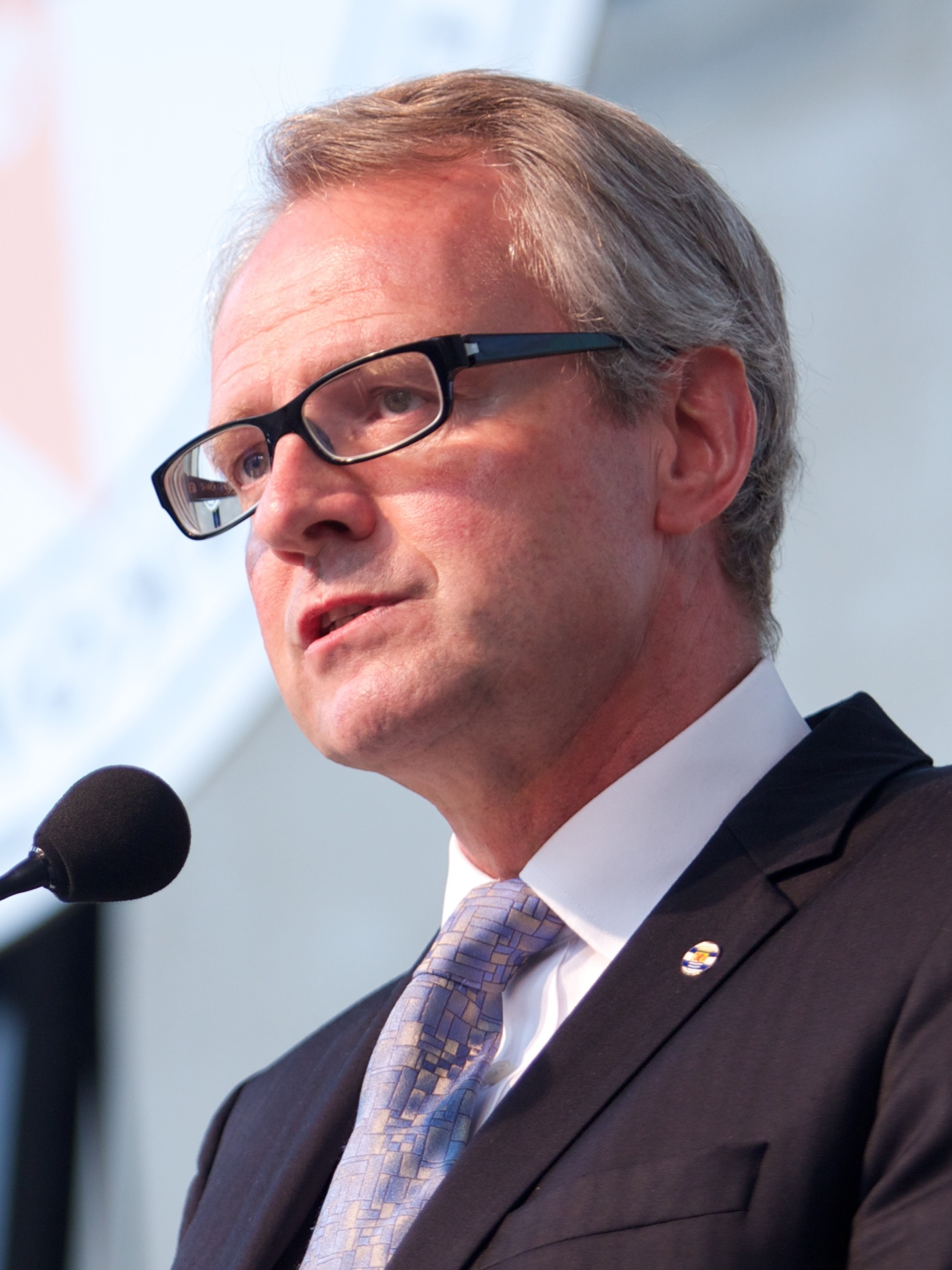

King's Commissioner of Zeeland
- In office 1 March 2013 – 16 September 2024
- Preceded by: Karla Peijs
- Succeeded by: Hugo de Jonge

Mayor of Bergen op Zoom
- In office 16 May 2005 – 1 March 2013
- Preceded by: Dick de Cloe (acting)
- Succeeded by: Dick de Cloe (acting)

Mayor of Noordwijkerhout
- In office 1 December 2001 – 16 May 2005
- Preceded by: Irma Günther (acting)
- Succeeded by: Irma Günther (acting)

Member of the municipal council of The Hague
- In office 12 April 1994 – 1 December 2001

Personal details
- Born: Johannes Marcellus Maria Polman; 16 January 1963 (age 63) Ootmarsum, Netherlands
- Party: Democrats 66
- Spouse: Married
- Children: 4 children
- Education: University of Twente (Bachelor of Public Administration, Master of Public Administration)
- Occupation: Politician; Civil servant

Johannes Marcellus Maria "Han" Polman (born 16 January 1963) is a Dutch politician of the Democrats 66 (D66) party. He served as King's Commissioner of Zeeland from 1 March 2013 until 16 September 2024. Previously he was Mayor of Bergen op Zoom and Noordwijkerhout.

== Biography ==
Polman entered politics at a young age, he worked as a civil servant at the Ministry of the Interior and Kingdom Relations from 1986 until 2000, he was only twenty-three at the time. He served as a municipal councillor in The Hague from 12 April 1994 to 1 December 2001. He also served as Director of Welfare in Vlaardingen from 2000 to 1 December 2001, when he became Mayor of Noordwijkerhout (former municipality since 2019). Upon his appointment, he was the youngest mayor in the Netherlands, at the age of thirty-eight. In 2005 he left Noordwijkerhout when he was selected as Mayor of Bergen op Zoom. On 1 March 2013, he succeeded Karla Peijs as the Queen's Commissioner (from 30 April 2013: King's Commissioner) of Zeeland.

Polman is married and has four children.

Political offices
Preceded by Jan Andel; Irma Günther (acting)	Mayor of Noordwijkerhout; 2001–2005	Succeeded by Gerrit Goedhart; Irma Günther (acting)
Preceded by Peter van der Velden; Dick de Cloe (acting)	Mayor of Bergen op Zoom; 2005–2013	Succeeded by Frank Petter; Dick de Cloe (acting)
Preceded by Karla Peijs	King's Commissioner of Zeeland; 2013–2024	Succeeded by Hugo de Jonge
