= Good Landlordship Act =

Dutch rented housing statute passed in 2023

States General of the Netherlands
- Long title: Regels ter bevordering van goed verhuurderschap en het voorkomen en tegengaan van ongewenste verhuurpraktijken
- Passed by: House of Representatives
- Passed: 7 March 2023
- Passed by: Senate
- Passed: 21 March 2023

First chamber: House of Representatives
- Introduced by: Hugo de Jonge
- Status: In force

The Good Landlordship Act (Dutch: Wet goed verhuurderschap) is a statute regulating rented housing in the Netherlands.

== Legislative history ==
The Good Landlordship Act was introduced in the House of Representatives by Minister for Housing and Spatial Planning Hugo de Jonge on 7 June 2022. It was passed by the body on 7 March 2023 with 147 out of 150 votes in favor; only the Van Haga Group voted in opposition. The Senate approved the bill on 21 March without a vote.

== Affordable Rent Act ==
De Jonge first proposed the Affordable Rent Act in the spring of 2022, intending to increase the affordability of rental properties for middle-class citizens who are ineligible for public housing by implementing rent control. He formally introduced the bill in the House of Representatives as an amendment to the Good Landlordship Act on 5 February 2024. Rent for homes with fewer than 186 points according to a points system already used for public housing (fewer than 147 points) would be capped in new contracts. About 300,000 homes were expected to be in this category. Points are awarded for characteristics such as size and level of insulation of the property. The maximum rent for homes with 186 points would be at €1,123 per month, and rents could be raised yearly at most by the average wage increase in collective agreements plus one percentage point. In order to incentivize housing developments, new construction before 2026 would be permitted to have 10% higher rents.

The bill as submitted by De Jonge to the House differed in several ways from his initial proposal in response to a warning by the Council of State that the bill would make the Dutch housing markets less attractive to investors. The revised version included a higher permitted yearly raise of rents, a broader exception for new construction, and higher rents for properties with a high value. Despite De Jonge's adjustments, mostly center-right parties still believed that the proposal would lead to a decline in the rental stock as a result of lower incomes for landlords. Due to the fourth Rutte cabinet being a caretaker government, the House could have barred treatment of the bill by declaring it controversial. However, this action was not supported by a majority. The Affordable Rent Act was adopted by the House in April 2024 with 112 out of 150 votes in favor; several center-right and right-wing parties including VVD and BBB were in opposition. An amendment by GroenLinks–PvdA reduced the allowed rent for properties with a poor energy rating. The Senate passed the bill on 25 June 2024, and it went to effect on 1 July.
