= Ernst Kuipers =

Dutch gastroenterologist and politician

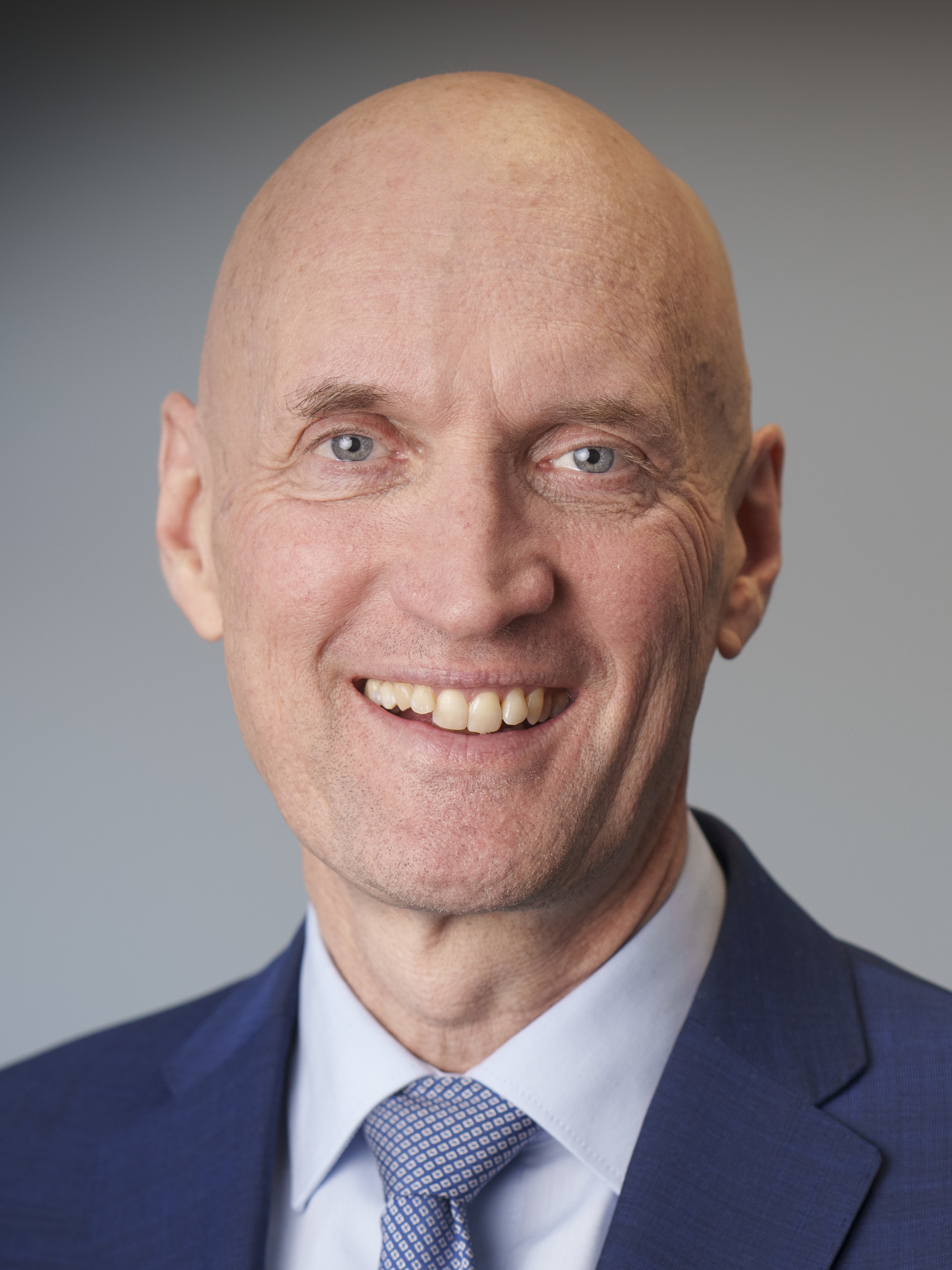
- Kuipers in 2022

Minister of Health, Welfare and Sport
- In office 10 January 2022 – 10 January 2024
- Prime Minister: Mark Rutte
- Preceded by: Hugo de Jonge
- Succeeded by: Conny Helder

Chief Executive Officer of the Erasmus University Medical Center
- In office 15 March 2013 – January 2022
- Preceded by: Hans Büller
- Succeeded by: Stefan Sleijfer (ad interim)

Chairman of the National Acute Care Network
- In office 2015 – January 2022
- Preceded by: Jos Aartsen

Personal details
- Born: Ernst Johan Kuipers; 14 December 1959 (age 66) Meppel, Netherlands
- Party: Democrats 66
- Children: 4
- Education: University of Groningen; Vrije Universiteit Amsterdam
- Occupation: Physician; politician

Ernst Johan Kuipers (Dutch pronunciation: [ˈɛrnst ˈjoːɦɑŋ ˈkœypərs]; born 14 December 1959) is a Dutch gastroenterologist, professor and politician who served as Minister of Health, Welfare and Sport in the fourth Rutte cabinet from 2022 until 2024. He is a member of the Democrats 66 (D66) party.

== Early life and education ==
Kuipers was born in 1959 in Meppel, Drenthe and grew up in Creil, Flevoland. His father was a general practitioner and his mother a pharmacist. He attended secondary school in Emmeloord, where he completed the gymnasium curriculum in 1978. After obtaining a propaedeutic diploma (propedeuse) in chemistry, he studied medicine at the University of Groningen. Kuipers specialized in internal medicine and gastroenterology, and obtained a doctorate from the VU University Medical Center (now, Amsterdam University Medical Centers) in 1995.

== Career ==
Between 1995 and 1997, Kuipers worked as a research associate at the Division of Infectious Diseases of the Vanderbilt University in Nashville, Tennessee.

In 2000, Kuipers was appointed professor and head of gastroenterology and hepatology at the Erasmus University Medical Center (EMC). In this capacity, he led a widely reported 2007 study published in the journal Gut which showed that new cases of stomach cancer would likely fall 25 percent over the following 10 years in Western countries because of better living conditions.

Kuipers became a member of the board of directors of the Erasmus University Medical Center in 2012, and he was appointed chief executive officer on 15 March 2013. He was awarded the United European Gastroenterology Research Prize of €100,000 in 2016. In addition to his role at the EMC, Kuipers started serving as chairman of the National Acute Care Network (LNAZ) in 2015. In this position, he played a prominent role in the response to the COVID-19 pandemic in the Netherlands, coordinating the distribution of patients across intensive care units in the country.

=== Minister of Health, 2022–2024 ===
On 10 January 2022, Kuipers joined the fourth Rutte cabinet as Minister of Health, Welfare and Sport, on behalf of the Democrats 66. He had been politically unaffiliated before. The installation of the new cabinet occurred during the last COVID-19 lockdown in the Netherlands, and Kuipers was able to announce a relaxation of restrictions that same month. He would later oppose the establishment of treatment centers for long COVID.

Kuipers argued the Dutch healthcare system was no longer top-tier, pointing at shortages of general practitioners and dentists as well as long waiting lists for mental healthcare. He said healthcare had to be reformed to remain sustainable and affordable in times of an ageing population, and he posed increased cooperation and centralization, especially of specialized care, and the replacement of competition by cooperation as solutions. He signed the Integrated Healthcare Agreement in September 2022 to tackle future affordability issues and to improve cooperation between healthcare providers. Furthermore, Kuiper decided to reduce the number of specialized pediatric cardiac surgery centers in the Netherlands from four to two. The impacted hospitals took legal action, and the court later blocked the plans. Kuipers did not manage to finish centralization plans in acute care amongst opposition from its trade association. He also determined breast cancer patients would not be reimbursed for the novel medicine Trodelvy due to its high costs. He admitted such decisions would become more common in the future.

Kuipers stepped down as minister on 10 January 2024, when the cabinet had become demissionary, to pursue an unspecified international role. He was succeeded by Minister for Long-term Care and Sport Conny Helder (VVD), while Pia Dijkstra became Minister for Medical Care on behalf of D66.

== Life after politics ==
It was announced several weeks later that Kuipers would join Nanyang Technological University in Singapore as Vice President of Research as well as distinguished professor starting 1 May.

In 2025, Kuipers was appointed to the World Health Organization (WHO) Regional Office for Europe’s Pan-European Commission on Climate and Health (PECCH), chaired by Katrín Jakobsdóttir.

== Electoral history ==
Electoral history of Ernst Kuipers
Year	Body	Party	Pos.	Votes	Result		Ref.
Year	Body	Party	Pos.	Votes	Party seats	Individual	Ref.
2023	House of Representatives	Democrats 66	74 (Note: Kuipers participated as a lijstduwer.)	682	9	Lost	

== Notes ==
Political offices
Preceded by Hugo de Jonge	Minister of Health, Welfare and Sport; 2022–2024	Succeeded by Conny Helder
