= Pia Dijkstra =

Dutch politician and television presenter

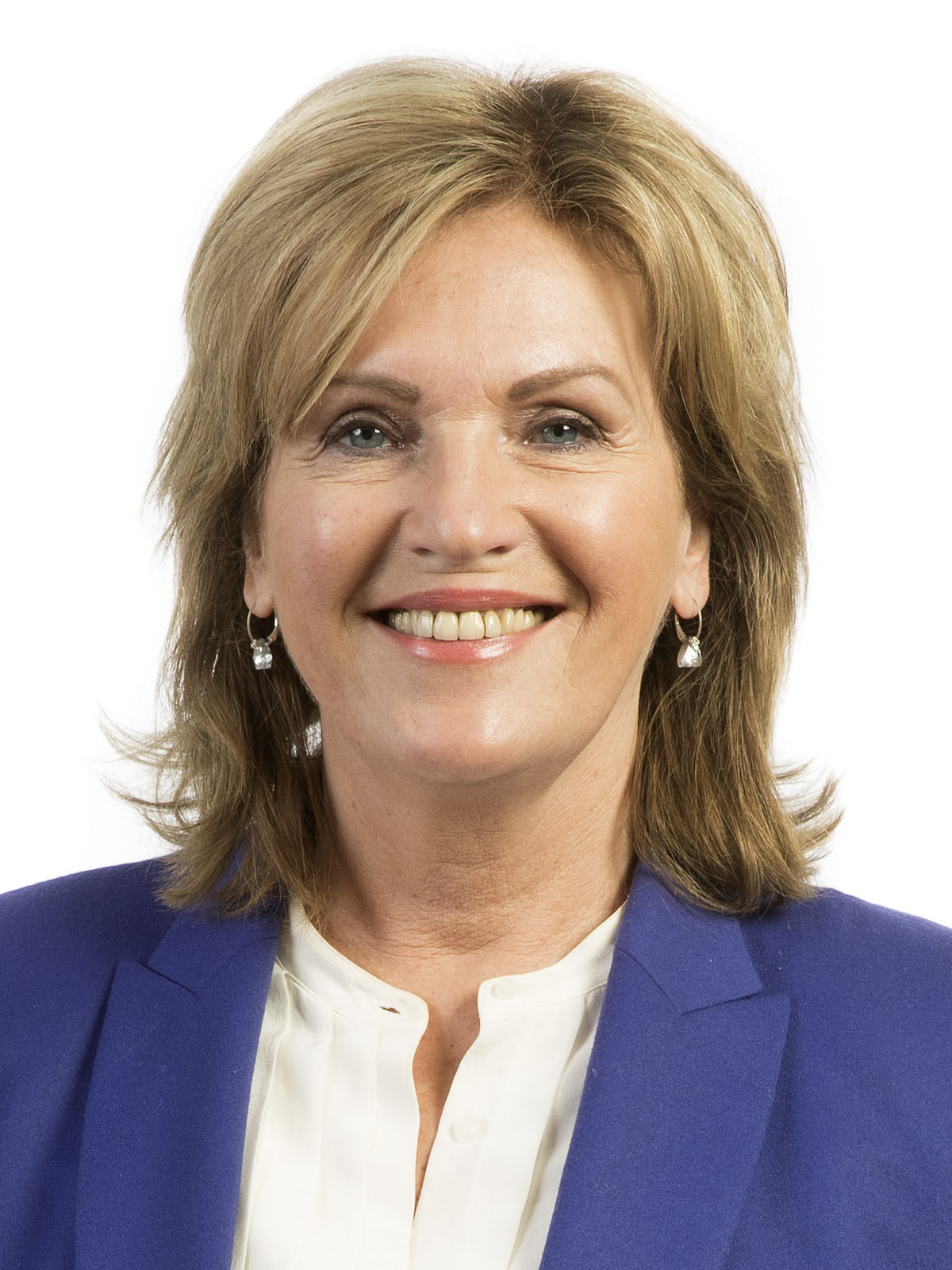
- Dijkstra in 2017

Minister for Medical Care
- In office 2 February 2024 – 2 July 2024
- Prime Minister: Mark Rutte
- Preceded by: Conny Helder (Note: As minister responsible for the medical care portfolio, and minister without portfolio within the Ministry of Health, Welfare and Sport.)
- Succeeded by: Vicky Maeijer (Note: As State Secretary for Long-term and Social Care)

Member of the House of Representatives
- In office 17 June 2010 – 31 March 2021

Personal details
- Born: Pietje Aafke Dijkstra; 9 December 1954 (age 71) Franeker, Netherlands
- Party: Democrats 66
- Spouse: Gerlach Cerfontaine (m. 1992)
- Children: 3
- Occupation: Politician; television presenter

Pietje Aafke "Pia" Dijkstra (Dutch pronunciation: [ˈpijaː ˈdɛikstraː]; born 9 December 1954) is a Dutch politician of the Democrats 66 (D66) and former television presenter. From 2010 to 2021, she served as a member of the House of Representatives. She was Minister for Medical Care in the demissionary fourth Rutte cabinet from February 2024 until July 2024.

== Early life and career ==
Dijkstra was born in Franeker, and she completed her secondary education in Sneek and Leeuwarden with a gymnasium diploma. She studied theology at the University of Amsterdam between 1974 and 1978, but she did not obtain any degree. She subsequently worked as a producer and spokesperson for Interkerkelijke Omroep Nederland (IKON) for six years and as a creator and host for Radio Netherlands Worldwide (RNW) for four years. Dijkstra became a reporter for the NCRV current affairs program Hier en Nu in 1986. She was news anchor of the NOS Journaal from 1988 until 2000, and she hosted several television and radio shows such as Vinger aan de Pols and Het Kinderziekenhuis in the following decade for AVRO.

She served as a member of the House of Representatives from 2010 to 2021, focusing on issues such as healthcare, medical ethics, and emancipation. She introduced a bill to have citizens marked as organ donor by default in the donor registry, which was enacted into law after passing both houses of parliament. By 2024, the measure had led to a 50% increase in citizens who had recorded their preference in the registry. Proposed legislation by Dijkstra to allow for euthanasia in the absence of intolerable suffering for those over 75 years of age did not garner enough support. Her initial 2019 plan was criticized by the Council of State. Near the end of her last term, she wrote a bill to abolish a five-day waiting period for abortions. Jan Paternotte took over her proposal, and it was approved by the parliament in 2022.

Dijkstra was appointed Minister for Medical Care in the demissionary fourth Rutte cabinet on 2 February 2024, following the resignation of Ernst Kuipers as Minister of Health, Welfare and Sport the month before. Minister for Long-term Care and Sport Conny Helder had succeeded Kuipers in an acting capacity, and continued to lead the Ministry of Health, Welfare and Sport after transferring the medical care portfolio to Dijkstra. Dijkstra's responsibilities included curative care, health insurance, medication, medical ethics, COVID-19, and pandemic preparedness. Her term as minister ended on 2 July 2024, when the Schoof cabinet was sworn in.

== Personal life ==
Dijkstra married Gerlach Cerfontaine on 1 September 1992, and they have three children.

== Notes ==
Political offices
Preceded by Conny Helder as Minister for Long-term Care and Sport	Minister for Medical Care; 2024	Succeeded by Vicky Maeijer as State Secretary for Long-term and Social Care
