= Robert Rep =

Dutch politician (born 1965)

Member of the House of Representatives
- In office 4 July 2024 – 11 November 2025
- Preceded by: Vicky Maeijer

Personal details
- Born: 30 December 1965 (age 60) Utrecht, Netherlands
- Party: Party for Freedom
- Occupation: Politician

Robert Johannes Hendrikus Hermanus Rep (born 30 December 1965) is a Dutch politician for the Party for Freedom, who was a member of the House of Representatives between July 2024 and November 2025. He succeeded Vicky Maeijer, who had been appointed State Secretary for Long-term and Social Care in the Schoof cabinet, and he was the PVV's spokesperson on customs and export credit insurance.

== House committee assignments ==
- Committee for Economic Affairs
- Committee for Finance
- Committee for Defence
- Committee for Infrastructure and Water Management

== Electoral history ==
Electoral history of Robert Rep
Year	Body	Party	Pos.	Votes	Result		Ref.
Year	Body	Party	Pos.	Votes	Party seats	Individual	Ref.
2023	House of Representatives	Party for Freedom	40	825	37	Lost (Note: Rep was appointed to the body later during the term due to a vacancy.)	
2025	House of Representatives	Party for Freedom	45	317	26	Lost	

== See also ==
- List of members of the House of Representatives of the Netherlands, 2023–2025
