= Vicky Maeijer =

Dutch politician (born 1986)

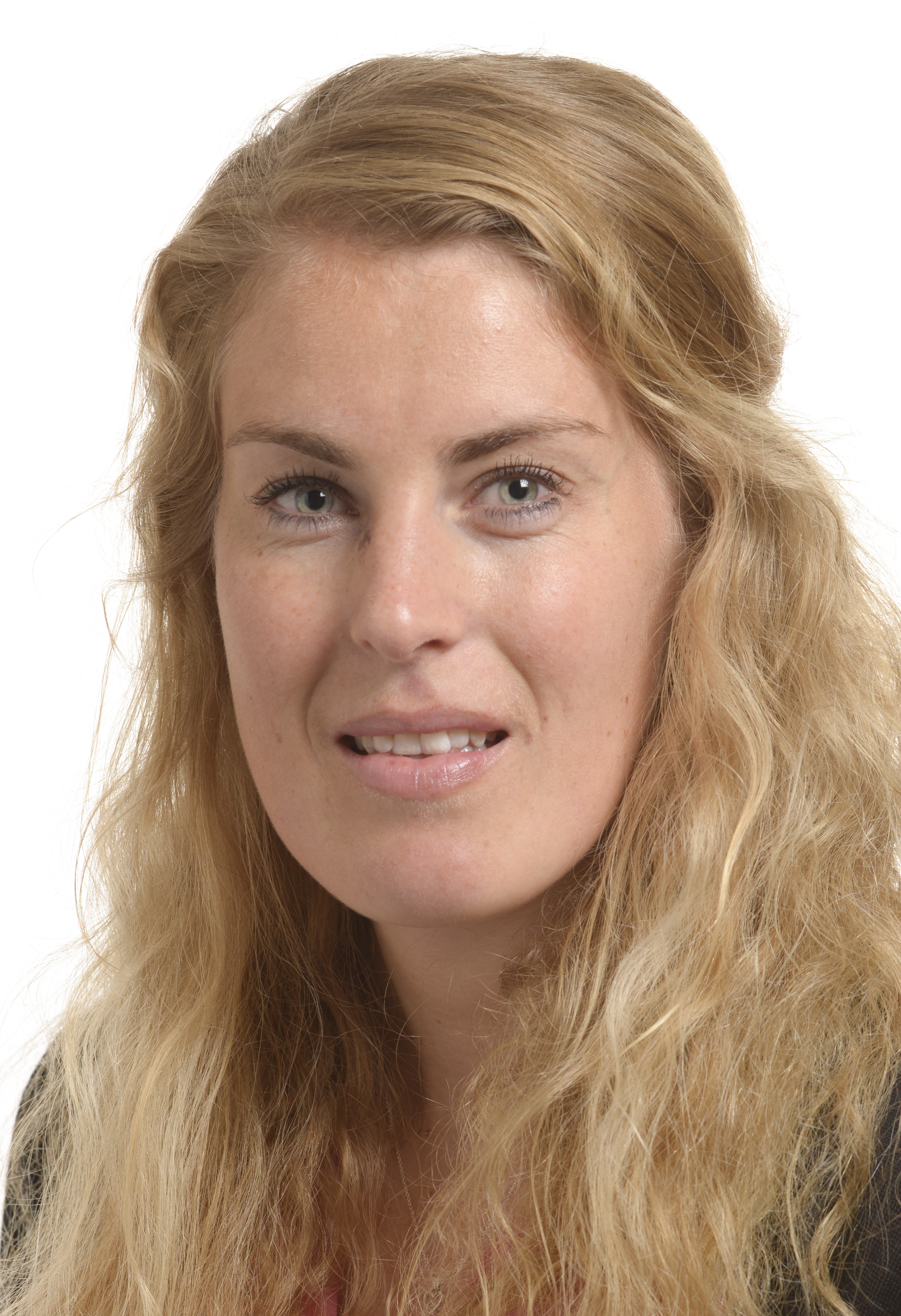

State Secretary for Long-term and Social Care
- In office 2 July 2024 – 3 June 2025
- Prime Minister: Dick Schoof
- Minister: Fleur Agema
- Preceded by: Pia Dijkstra (Note: as Minister for Medical Care)
- Succeeded by: Nicki Pouw-Verweij

Member of the House of Representatives
- In office 23 March 2017 – 2 July 2024
- Succeeded by: Robert Rep

Member of the European Parliament
- In office 1 July 2014 – 23 March 2017
- Constituency: Netherlands

Member of the States of South Holland
- In office 17 March 2011 – 1 July 2014

Personal details
- Born: 7 September 1986 (age 40) Rotterdam, Netherlands
- Party: Party for Freedom (2006–present)
- Education: Erasmus University Rotterdam

Vicky Maeijer (born 7 September 1986) is a Dutch politician representing the Party for Freedom (PVV). From 2 July 2024 to 3 June 2025, she served as State Secretary for Long-term and Social Care in the Schoof cabinet. Previously, she was a Member of the European Parliament for the Netherlands from 2014 to 2017 and a member of the House of Representatives from 2017 to 2024.

== Career ==
Maeijer studied at Erasmus University Rotterdam, obtaining a bachelor's degree in Dutch law and a master's degree in international and European public law in 2009, which was subsequently declared invalid due to plagiarism. Between 2007 and 2014, she worked at different times as a policy worker for the Party for Freedom, founded in 2006, in the House of Representatives of the Netherlands and the European Parliament. She started working for Raymond de Roon and later became an aide to Louis Bontes. She entered the 2011 Dutch provincial elections as the lijsttrekker (top party candidate) for the Party for Freedom at age 24. She stated that she wanted the provincial government to focus on its main tasks of spatial planning, traffic and environment. Other stated issues were the decrease in provincial civil servants, a decrease in the number of members of the provincial State and provincial executive, and a publicly elected King's Commissioner.

Maeijer was a member of the States of South Holland between 17 March 2011 and 1 July 2014. For the 2012 general election she was number 21 on the Party for Freedom list. Until July 2014 she was the party leader in the States of South Holland. In the 2014 European Parliament elections Maeijer was elected for the Party for Freedom. In 2017, she was elected as a Member of the House of Representatives, and she took office on 23 March. She received a third term in the 2023 general election, and she has since been the PVV's spokesperson for medical ethics, war victims, and sports.

After the PVV, VVD, NSC, and BBB formed the Schoof cabinet, Maeijer was sworn in as State Secretary for Long-term and Social Care on 2 July 2024. Her portfolio included caregiving, supported living, long-term care, disabilities, district nursing, paramedics, healthcare quality, personal healthcare budget, addiction care, and patient organizations. In November 2024, BNR Nieuwsradio reported based on plagiarism detection software and expert opinion that Maeijer had copied over half of the content of her master's thesis about the Kadi v Council and Commission case from other sources. Erasmus University Rotterdam subsequently started an investigation. On March 13, 2025, Erasmus University Rotterdam (EUR) declared her master's thesis invalid and revoked her degree.

== Electoral history ==
Electoral history of Vicky Maeijer
Year	Body	Party	Pos.	Votes	Result		Ref.
Year	Body	Party	Pos.	Votes	Party seats	Individual	Ref.
2010	House of Representatives	Party for Freedom	31	336	24	Lost	
2012	House of Representatives	Party for Freedom	21	423	15	Lost	
2014	European Parliament	Party for Freedom	2		4	Won	
2015	Provincial Council of South Holland	Party for Freedom	23		8	Lost	
2017	House of Representatives	Party for Freedom	3	6,751	20	Won	
2021	House of Representatives	Party for Freedom	5	2,709	17	Won	
2023	House of Representatives	Party for Freedom	9	2,547	37	Won	
2025	House of Representatives	Party for Freedom	10	1,520	26	Won	

== Notes ==
Political offices
Preceded by Pia Dijkstra as Minister for Medical Care	State Secretary for Long-term and Social Care; 2024–present	Incumbent
