= Karla Peijs =

Dutch politician (born 1944)

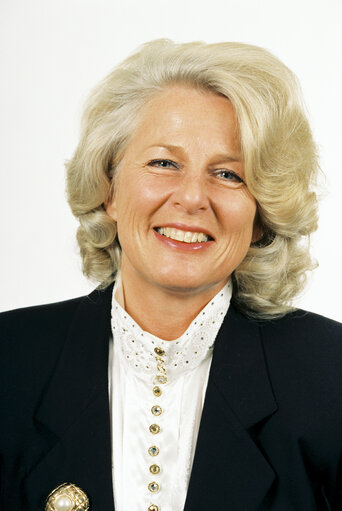
- Peijs in 1994

Queen's Commissioner of Zeeland
- In office 1 March 2007 – 1 March 2013
- Monarch: Beatrix
- Preceded by: Wim van Gelder
- Succeeded by: Han Polman

Minister of Housing, Spatial Planning and the Environment
- In office 21 September 2006 – 26 September 2006; Ad interim
- Prime Minister: Jan Peter Balkenende
- Preceded by: Sybilla Dekker
- Succeeded by: Pieter Winsemius

Minister of Transport and Water Management
- In office 27 May 2003 – 22 February 2007
- Prime Minister: Jan Peter Balkenende
- Preceded by: Roelf de Boer
- Succeeded by: Camiel Eurlings

Member of the European Parliament
- In office 25 July 1989 – 27 May 2003
- Parliamentary group: European People's Party Group

Personal details
- Born: Karla Maria Henriëtte Peijs; 1 September 1944 (age 82) Tilburg, Netherlands
- Party: Christian Democratic Appeal (from 1980)
- Spouse: Rinus Platschorre (m. 1971)
- Education: Radboud University Nijmegen (Bachelor of Social Science); Vrije Universiteit Amsterdam (Master of Social Science)
- Occupation: Politician · Corporate director · Nonprofit director · Teacher

Karla Maria Henriëtte Peijs (born 1 September 1944) is a retired Dutch politician of the Christian Democratic Appeal (CDA).

== Life ==
Karla Peijs was born on 1 September 1944 in Tilburg, Netherlands.

From 1982 to 1989 Peijs a member of the Utrecht Provincial Council. From 1999 to 2004 she was an elected Member of the European Parliament, representing the European People's Party (Christian Democratic Appeal) and European People's Party Group (EPP).

Political offices
Preceded by Roelf de Boer	Minister of Transport and Water Management; 2003–2007	Succeeded by Camiel Eurlings
Preceded by Sybilla Dekker	Minister of Housing, Spatial; Planning and the Environment; Ad interim 2006	Succeeded by Pieter Winsemius
Preceded by Wim van Gelder	Queen's Commissioner of Zeeland; 2007–2013	Succeeded by Han Polman
