= Hugo de Jonge =

Dutch politician (born 1977)

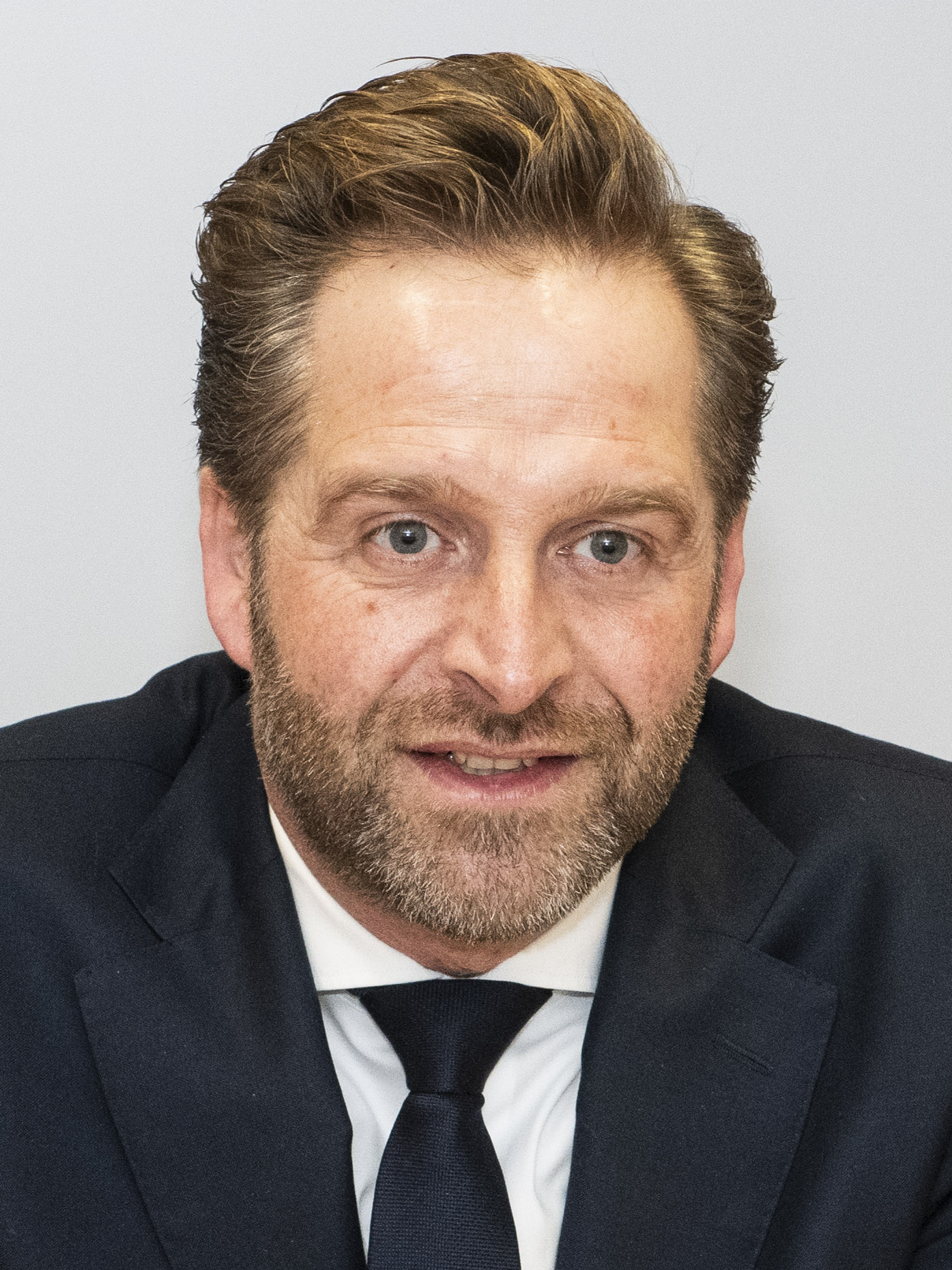
- De Jonge in 2023

King's Commissioner of Zeeland
- Incumbent
- Assumed office 16 September 2024
- Monarch: Willem-Alexander
- Preceded by: Han Polman

Minister of the Interior and Kingdom Relations
- In office 5 September 2023 – 2 July 2024
- Prime Minister: Mark Rutte
- Preceded by: Hanke Bruins Slot
- Succeeded by: Judith Uitermark

Minister for Housing and Spatial Planning
- In office 10 January 2022 – 2 July 2024
- Prime Minister: Mark Rutte
- Preceded by: Position established
- Succeeded by: Mona Keijzer

Leader of the Christian Democratic Appeal
- In office 15 July 2020 – 10 December 2020
- Preceded by: Sybrand van Haersma Buma
- Succeeded by: Wopke Hoekstra

Deputy Prime Minister of the Netherlands
- In office 26 October 2017 – 10 January 2022 Serving with Kajsa Ollongren; Carola Schouten; Wouter Koolmees (2019–2020)
- Prime Minister: Mark Rutte
- Preceded by: Lodewijk Asscher
- Succeeded by: Sigrid Kaag

Minister of Health, Welfare and Sport
- In office 26 October 2017 – 10 January 2022
- Prime Minister: Mark Rutte
- Preceded by: Edith Schippers
- Succeeded by: Ernst Kuipers

Personal details
- Born: Hugo Mattheüs de Jonge; 26 September 1977 (age 48) Bruinisse, Zeeland, Netherlands
- Party: Christian Democratic Appeal
- Occupation: Politician; civil servant; teacher; school administrator; political consultant

Hugo Mattheüs de Jonge (Dutch pronunciation: [ˈɦyɣoː mɑˈteːjʏz də ˈjɔŋə]; born 26 September 1977) is a Dutch politician who has served as King's Commissioner of Zeeland since 1 July 2025, after an acting period from 16 September 2024. A member of the Christian Democratic Appeal (CDA), he was elected to its leadership in 2020 for the 2021 general election. He withdrew later that year, citing the impossibility of combining his position as Health Minister in charge of the COVID-19 pandemic efforts with his party leadership. He later served in the fourth Rutte cabinet as Minister for Housing and Spatial Planning from 2022 until 2024 and Minister of the Interior and Kingdom Relations from 2023 until 2024.

== Early life and career ==
De Jonge studied at the Ichthus Hogeschool in Rotterdam to become a teacher in primary education and then continued in Zwolle a study for school management, which he completed with a diploma "school leader primary education."

He worked in education for five years, first as a schoolteacher and eventually as a primary school deputy director.

De Jonge moved to national policy by working as a policy assistant for the CDA group in the House of Representatives in 2004. Between 2006 and 2010, he worked at the Ministry of Education, Culture and Science as political assistant to CDA Minister Maria van der Hoeven and State Secretary Marja van Bijsterveldt and as a policy assistant focusing on quality improvement of secondary education.

== Political career ==
=== Alderman ===
In 2010, De Jonge was appointed as an alderman in the Rotterdam municipal executive, tasked with the Education, Youth and Family portfolio. As such, he argued in 2013 on national television for the closing of the Islamic school association Ibn Ghaldoun after several problems came to light.

Following the 2014 municipal election, De Jonge was again appointed an alderman, with the Healthcare portfolio. The same year, he was announced as the "Politician of the Year" in Rotterdam. In October 2016, he announced a programme to persuade parents who are considered vulnerable to consider voluntary birth control. As he left the Rotterdam politics in October 2017, he was awarded the municipal Wolfert van Borselenpenning.

=== Minister ===
In October 2017, De Jonge was appointed Deputy Prime Minister and Minister of Health, Welfare and Sport in the Third Rutte cabinet. During the administration of the oath and installation of the new Ministers, De Jonge received media attention because of his unusual choice of shoes, receiving both criticism and praise.

After the resignation of Bruno Bruins as Minister for Medical Care on 19 March 2020, De Jonge became responsible for the government's response to the COVID-19 pandemic. In this capacity, he initiated the development of a COVID-19 app.

On 18 June 2020, De Jonge announced his candidacy for the leadership of the Christian Democratic Appeal, which had been vacant since the resignation of Sybrand van Haersma Buma in May 2019. He won the vote against Pieter Omtzigt. As Minister for Housing and Spatial Planning, De Jonge introduced the Good Landlordship Act to regulate rented housing, and it passed both houses of parliament in March 2023. He proposed an amendment the following year to extend rent control beyond public housing, and he filed a bill that would mandate a certain percentage of new housing to be affordable. It went into effect in July 2024. The fourth Rutte cabinet had been a caretaker government since July 2023. However, De Jonge continued introducing new legislative proposals as no housing-related subjects had been exempted from consideration by the House of Representatives.

His term as minister ended on 2 July 2024, when the Schoof cabinet was sworn in, and he became King's Commissioner of Zeeland in an acting capacity on 16 September 2024, succeeding Han Polman. He was appointed to the office and his acting period ended on 1 July 2025.

== Political positions ==
In his candidacy for the CDA leadership, De Jonge expressed his commitment to the political centre, seeing the CDA as a "broad people's party." He is seen as less right-wing on economic issues than his predecessors, having previously called for the market and competition in healthcare to be restrained. He also believes his party should not cooperate with the right-wing populist parties, Party for Freedom and Forum for Democracy.

== Personal life ==
De Jonge has a wife called Mirelle, and they have children.

Political offices
Preceded by Lodewijk Asscher	Deputy Prime Minister; 2017–2022; Served alongside: Kajsa Ollongren (2017–2019; 2020–2022); Wouter Koolmees (2019–2020); Carola Schouten	Succeeded by Sigrid Kaag; Wopke Hoekstra; Carola Schouten
Preceded by Edith Schippers	Minister of Health, Welfare and Sport; 2017–2022	Succeeded by Ernst Kuipers
New office	Minister for Housing and Spatial Planning; 2022–2024	Succeeded by Mona Keijzer
Preceded by Hanke Bruins Slot	Minister of the Interior and Kingdom Relations; 2023–2024	Succeeded by Judith Uitermark
Preceded by Han Polman	King's Commissioner of Zeeland; 2024–present	Incumbent
Party political offices
Preceded by Sybrand van Haersma Buma	Leader of the Christian Democratic Appeal; 2020	Succeeded by Wopke Hoekstra
