= Anthony Gerhard Alexander van Rappard =

Dutch politician

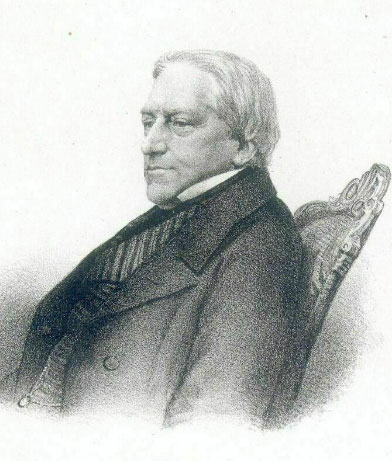
Anthony Gerhard Alexander van Rappard by Anthony Everhardus

Anthony Gerhard Alexander (Anthon), Ridder van Rappard (5 October 1799, Utrecht – 1 April 1869, Utrecht) was a Dutch politician.
