= Zeeland =

Province of the Netherlands

Zeeland Zeêland (Zeeuws) Zealand
- Province
- Province of Zeeland; Provincie Zeeland (Dutch); Provincie Zeêland (Zeeuws)
- Flag Coat of arms Brandmark
- Mottoes: Latin: Luctor et emergo, Dutch: Ik worstel en kom boven ("I struggle and emerge")
- Anthem: "Zeeuws volkslied" ("Zeelandic anthem")
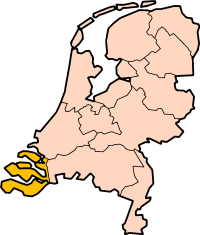
- Location of Zeeland in the Netherlands

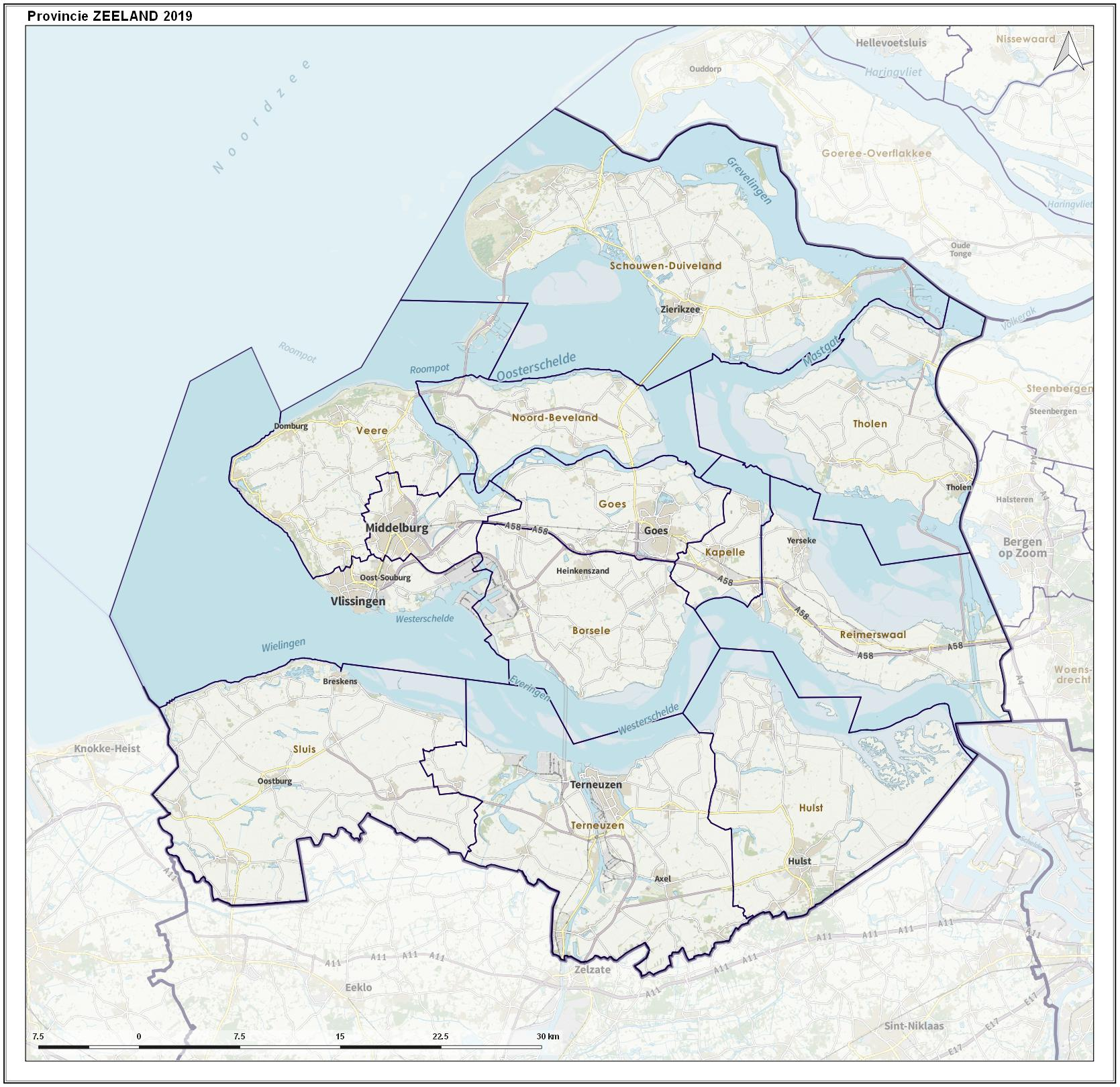
- Topography map of Zeeland
- Coordinates: 51°34′N 3°45′E
- Country: Netherlands
- Capital: Middelburg
- Largest city: Terneuzen

Government
  - King's commissioner: Hugo de Jonge (acting) (CDA)
  - Council: States of Zeeland

Area (2023)
  - Total: 2,933 km^{2} (1,132 sq mi)
  - Land: 1,780 km^{2} (690 sq mi)
  - Water: 1,154 km^{2} (446 sq mi)
  - Rank: 8th

Population (1 January 2023)
  - Total: 391,124
  - Rank: 12th
  - Density: 220/km^{2} (570/sq mi)
  - Rank: 10th
- Demonym: Zeeuw

GDP
  - Total: €20.626 billion (2024)
  - Per capita: €52,617 (2024)
- Time zone: UTC+01:00 (CET)
  - Summer (DST): UTC+02:00 (CEST)
- ISO 3166 code: NL-ZE
- HDI (2021): 0.917 very high · 10th
- Website: Official website

Zeeland (Dutch: [ˈzeːlɑnt]; Zeelandic: Zeêland [ˈzɪəlɑnt]), historically known in English by the exonym Zealand, is the westernmost and least populous province of the Netherlands. Located in the south-western corner of the country, it borders North Brabant to the east, South Holland to the north, and an international border with Belgium to the south and west (Flemish provinces of Antwerp, East and West Flanders).

Zeeland consists of a number of islands and peninsulas (hence its name, meaning "Sealand"), with only the southern part (Zeelandic Flanders) not being an island or peninsula. Its capital is Middelburg with a population of 48,544 as of November 2019, although the largest municipality in Zeeland is Terneuzen (population 54,589). Zeeland has two seaports: Vlissingen and Terneuzen. Its area is 2,933 square kilometres (1,132 sq mi), of which 1,154 square kilometres (446 sq mi) is water; it had a population of about 391,000 as of January 2023.

Large parts of Zeeland are below sea level. The last great flooding of the area was in 1953. Tourism is an important economic activity. In the summer, its beaches make it a popular destination for tourists, especially German tourists. In some areas, the population can be two to four times higher during the high summer season. The coat of arms of Zeeland shows a lion half-emerged from water, and the text luctor et emergo (Latin for "I struggle and emerge"). The country of New Zealand was named after Zeeland after it was sighted by Dutch explorer Abel Tasman.

== History ==
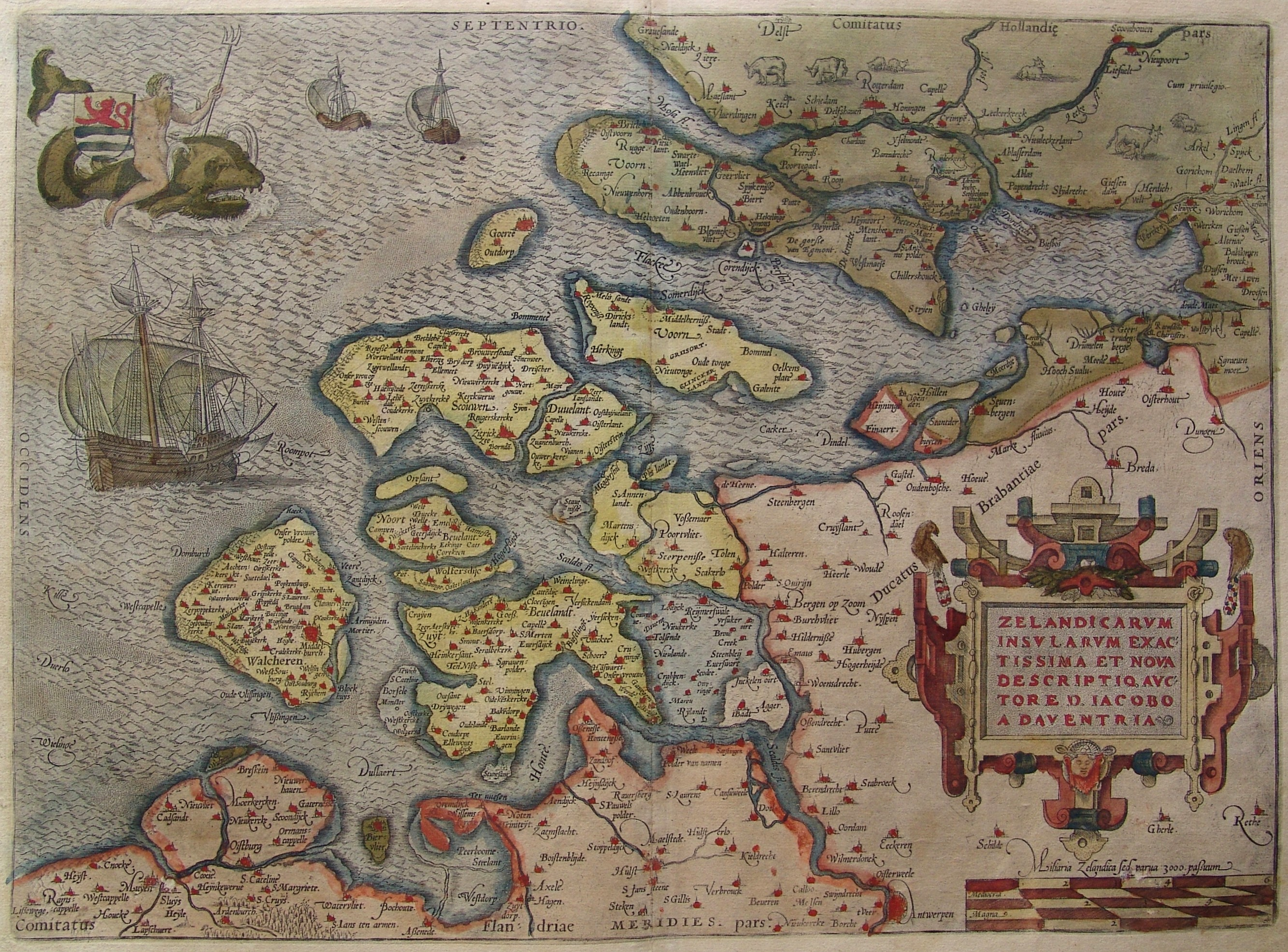
Ortelius after van Deventer: The County of Zeeland in 1580

Carel Allard: County of Zeeland, 1690.

Zeeland was a contested area between the counts of Holland and Flanders until 1299, when the last count of Holland died. The Counts of Hainaut then gained control of the County of Zeeland, followed by the counts of Bavaria, Burgundy, and Habsburg. After 1585, Zeeland followed, as one of the 7 independent provinces, the fate of the Northern part of The Netherlands.

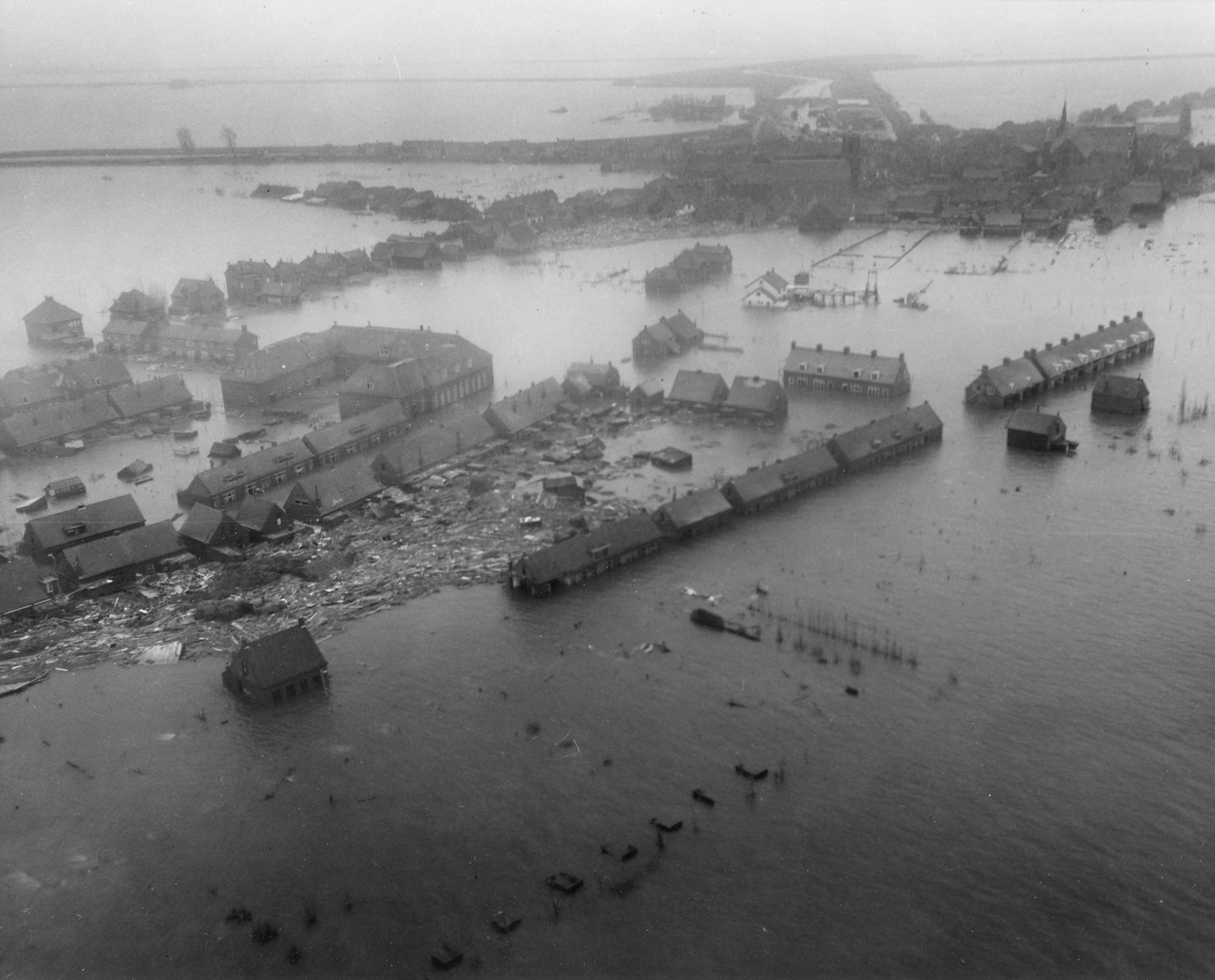
North Sea flood of 1953 in a town in Zuid-Beveland

In 1432, it became part of the Low Countries possessions of Philip the Good of Burgundy, the later Seventeen Provinces. Through marriage, the Seventeen Provinces became the property of the Habsburgs in 1477. In the Eighty Years' War, Zeeland was on the side of the Union of Utrecht, and became one of the United Provinces. The area now called Zeeuws-Vlaanderen (or Zeelandic Flanders) was not part of Zeeland, but a part of the county of Flanders (still under Habsburg control) that was conquered by the United Provinces, hence called Staats-Vlaanderen (see: Generality Lands).

After the French occupation (see département Bouches-de-l'Escaut) and the formation of the United Kingdom of the Netherlands in 1815, the present province Zeeland was formed.

During World War II, Zeeland was occupied by Nazi Germany between June 1940 and November 1944. In 1944, Zeeland was devastated by the Battle of the Scheldt and the Walcheren Landings, which brought about the Inundation of Walcheren, between British and Canadian forces, and the occupying Germans.

The catastrophic North Sea flood of 1953, which killed over 1800 people in Zeeland, led to the construction of the protective Delta Works.

== Geography ==
The parts of Zeeland

Zeeland consists of several islands (eilanden) and peninsulas (schiereilanden). The following are all the geographic parts that make up the province, from north to south:

- Schouwen-Duiveland (island)
- Tholen (peninsula, former island, includes former island Sint Philipsland)
- Noord-Beveland (peninsula, former island)
- Walcheren (peninsula, former island)
- Zuid-Beveland (peninsula, former island)
- Zeelandic Flanders (continental, bordering Belgian Flanders)

Satellite image of Zeeland

The province of Zeeland is a large river delta situated at the mouth of several major rivers, namely Scheldt ('Schelde'), Rhine ('Rijn') and Meuse ('Maas') (i.e. the Rhine–Meuse–Scheldt delta). Most of the province lies below sea level and was reclaimed from the sea by inhabitants over time. What used to be a muddy landscape, flooding at high tide and reappearing at low tide, became a series of small man-made hills that stayed dry at all times. The people of the province would later connect the hills by creating dikes, which led to a chain of dry land that later grew into bigger islands and gave the province its current shape. The shape of the islands has changed over time at the hands of both people and nature.

The deadly North Sea flood of 1953 inundated vast amounts of land that were only partially reclaimed. The subsequent construction of the Delta Works also changed the face of the province. The infrastructure, although very distinct by the number of bridges, tunnels and dams, has not shaped the geography of the province so much as the geography of the province has shaped its infrastructure. The dams, tunnels and bridges that are currently a vital part of the province's road system were constructed over the span of decades and came to replace old ferry lines. The final touch to this process came in 2003 when the Western Scheldt Tunnel was opened. It was the first solid connection between both banks of the Western Scheldt and ended the era of water separating the islands and peninsulas of Zeeland.

=== Municipalities ===
The province of Zeeland has 13 municipalities:

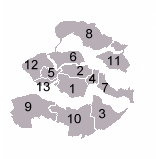
Municipalities in Zeeland

- Zeelandic Flanders COROP region
  - Hulst (27,575 inhabitants) <3>
  - Sluis (23,166 inhabitants) <9>
  - Terneuzen (54,463 inhabitants) <10>
- Overig Zeeland COROP region
  - Noord-Beveland (North Beveland) (7,581 inhabitants) <6>
  - Schouwen-Duiveland (34,065 inhabitants) <8>
  - Tholen (26,085 inhabitants) <11>
  - Walcheren
    - Middelburg (48,964 inhabitants) <5>
    - Veere (21,953 inhabitants) <12>
    - Vlissingen (44,358 inhabitants) <13>
  - Zuid-Beveland (South Beveland)
    - Borsele (22,818 inhabitants) <1>
    - Goes (38,594 inhabitants) <2>
    - Kapelle (12,882 inhabitants) <4>
    - Reimerswaal (22,896 inhabitants) <7>

The largest cities are: Middelburg with 42,000 inhabitants; Vlissingen with 34,000; Goes with 28,000; and Terneuzen with 25,000.

== Demographics ==
Historical population
Year	Pop.	±% p.a.
1942	256,131	—
1950	268,609	+0.60%
1960	283,721	+0.55%
1970	305,754	+0.75%
1980	348,268	+1.31%
1990	355,947	+0.22%
2000	371,866	+0.44%
2010	381,409	+0.25%
2020	383,488	+0.05%
Source: Statistics Netherlands

As of 1 January 2023, Zeeland had a population of 391,124 and a population density of 220/km^{2} (570/sq mi). It is the least populous and the 3rd least densely populated province of the Netherlands. Compared to other provinces, Zeeland hosts fewer immigrants and international residents.

=== Religion ===
Religion in Zeeland (2015)
1. Not religious (46.6%)
2. Protestant Church in the Netherlands (28.4%)
3. Catholicism (16.1%)
4. Other (7.40%)
5. Islam (1.50%)

Zeeland is more religious than the Netherlands as a whole, with over 53% being religious. The Dutch Bible Belt runs through Zeeland. Zeelandic Flanders is slightly more religious (58.5%) than the rest of Zeeland (51.6%). Among the religious population, Reformed Christianity (Calvinism) is dominant, however there is also a large community of Roman Catholics, mostly concentrated in Zeelandic Flanders.

After being a part of the vast Franco-Flemish Roman Catholic Diocese of Cambrai, Zeeland got its own bishopric, the Diocese of Middelburg, on 5 December 1559. It would face suppression in 1603, with its territory being merged into the Apostolic Vicariate of Batavia and only to be 'restored' on 22 March 1803 as the Apostolic Vicariate of Breda. It was promoted as the current Diocese of Breda, whose See is in western North Brabant, and was enlarged further in 1955, gaining territory from the Roman Catholic Diocese of Haarlem–Amsterdam.

Christian denominations in Zeeland (2015)(as % of local population)
Municipality	Protestant				Roman Catholic
Municipality	Protestant Church (PKN)	Dutch Reformed (NHK)	Reformed Churches	Total	Roman Catholic
Borsele	10.0	13.1	10.8	33.9	27.2
Goes	12.7	12.2	5.2	30.1	13.6
Hulst	1.9	1.7	0.3	3.9	55.2
Kapelle	13.2	19.6	7.3	40.1	13.1
Middelburg	11.5	10.5	10.9	32.9	8.2
Noord-Beveland	18.4	17.5	1.6	37.5	9.2
Reimerswaal	13.8	17.3	25.9	57.0	8.9
Schouwen-Duiveland	11.7	17.3	7.6	36.6	9.2
Sluis	4.2	12.3	1.8	18.3	24.4
Terneuzen	6.2	6.7	5.1	18.0	25.1
Tholen	13.3	24.0	11.6	48.9	6.1
Veere	21.0	9.4	16.5	46.9	5.1
Vlissingen	7.9	6.6	3.1	17.6	13.3

== Politics ==
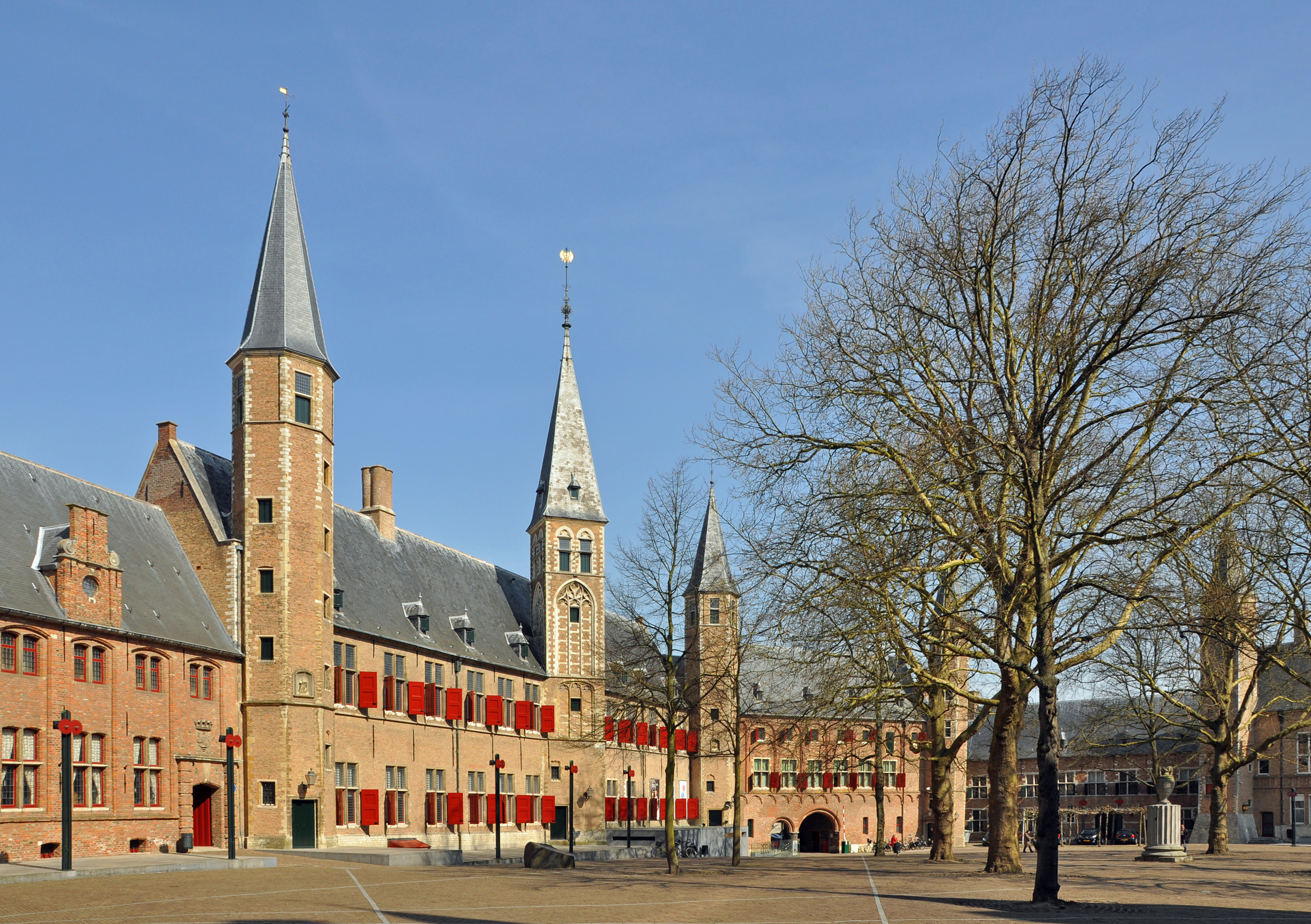
The States of Zeeland are located in a former abbey in Middelburg.

=== Provincial council ===
The States of Zeeland is the provincial council of Zeeland. As of the 2023 provincial election, the governing coalition consists of the BBB, SGP, CDA, and VVD, with 23 of 39 seats.

Partisan composition, 2007–2023
Party	2007	2011	2015	2019	2023
BBB	—N/a	—N/a	—N/a	—N/a	9
GL–PvdA	—N/a	—N/a	—N/a	—N/a	6
SGP	5	4	6	5	5
CDA	10	6	6	7	5
VVD	6	7	6	4	4
PVV	—N/a	5	4	2	2
Party for Zeeland	2	2	1	2	2
ChristianUnion	3	2	2	2	1
D66	0	2	3	1	1
JA21	—N/a	—N/a	—N/a	—N/a	1
PvdD	—N/a	—N/a	1	1	1
SP	5	3	4	2	1
FvD	—N/a	—N/a	—N/a	5	1
50PLUS	—N/a	0	1	2	0
PvdA	6	7	4	4	—N/a
GreenLeft	2	1	1	2	—N/a
Total	39	39	39	39	39

=== Provincial executive ===
The Provincial executive (Gedeputeerde Staten) of Zeeland is the executive branch of the province, which consists of several ministers and the King's commissioner of Zeeland. Hugo de Jonge (CDA) was appointed commissioner on 3 September 2025, having previously been acting commissioner from September 2024. The previous commissioner was Han Polman (D66), who filled the position from 1 March 2013 until 16 September 2024.

== Economy ==
The Gross domestic product (GDP) of the region was €13.6 billion in 2018, accounting for 1.8% of the Netherlands economic output. GDP per capita (2018) adjusted for purchasing power was €30,900, or 102% of the EU27 average that year.

== Transportation ==
=== Train ===
There is one passenger railway line, running from Vlissingen to Roosendaal. It serves the following stations in Zeeland:

- Vlissingen
- Vlissingen-Souburg
- Middelburg
- Arnemuiden
- Goes
- Kapelle-Biezelinge
- Kruiningen-Yerseke
- Krabbendijke
- Rilland-Bath

=== Bus ===
Bus lines in Zeeland include:

- Line 20: Goes → Terneuzen → Hulst (passing through the Westerschelde Tunnel)
- Line 50: Middelburg → Terneuzen → Ghent(4 services in each direction on weekends only.) (passing through the Westerschelde tunnel)
- Line 104: Renesse → Brouwersdam → Ouddorp → Spijkenisse
- Line 133: Middelburg → Vrouwenpolder → Oosterscheldedam → Renesse → Zierikzee → Grevelingendam → Oude-Tonge (crossing the Oosterscheldekering)
- Line 395: Zierikzee → Bruinisse → Rotterdam-Zuidplein

== Legend ==
Nehalennia is a mythological goddess of an ancient religion known around the province of Zeeland. Her worship dates back at least to the 2nd century BC, and flourished in the 2nd and 3rd centuries AD. She was possibly a regional god, either Celtic or pre-Germanic – but sources differ on the culture that first worshipped her. During the Roman era, her main function appeared to be the protection of travelers, especially seagoing travelers crossing the North Sea. Most of what is known about her mythology comes from the remains of carved stone offerings (votives) which have been dredged up from the Oosterschelde (Eastern Scheldt) since 1870. Two more Nehalennia offering stones have also been found in Cologne, Germany.

Provinciale Zeeuwse Courant and BN/De Stem are the regional daily newspapers in the province.

== Namesakes ==
The first westerners to sight New Zealand were captained by Dutch navigator Abel Tasman in 1642, although he did not land there. Tasman named it Staten Landt, believing it to be part of the land of that name off the coast of Argentina that is now known as Isla de los Estados. When that was shown not to be so, Dutch authorities named it Nova Zeelandia in Latin, Nieuw Zeeland in Dutch. The two major seafaring provinces of the Netherlands in its Golden Age were Holland and Zeeland, and the Dutch explorers originally named the largest landmass of Oceania and the two islands to the southeast Nieuw Holland and Nieuw Zeeland, respectively. The former was eventually replaced by the name Australia, but the name New Zealand remained in place for the latter. Captain James Cook of Britain later anglicised the name to New Zealand and, after British settlers arrived in New Zealand, English became the main language.

The city of Zeeland in the US state of Michigan was settled in 1847 by Dutchman Jannes van de Luyster and was incorporated in 1907. Flushing, a neighborhood within the borough of Queens, New York, is named after the city Flushing (Vlissingen in Dutch) in Zeeland. This dates from the period of the colony of New Netherland, when New York was still known as New Amsterdam. The Dutch colonies of Nieuw Walcheren and Nieuw Vlissingen, both on the Antillian island of Tobago, were both named after parts of Zeeland. The Canadian town of Zealand, New Brunswick, was named for the Zeeland birthplace of Dutchman Philip Crouse who settled in the area in 1789. Zeeland, North Dakota is another town named for this province and whose earliest settlers were of Dutch heritage.

Paramaribo, the capital and largest city of Suriname, has a Fort Zeelandia, the former Fort Willoughby during British colonization.

Fort Zeelandia was a fortress built over ten years from 1624 to 1634 by the Dutch East India Company, in the town of Anping (Tainan) on the island of Formosa, present day Taiwan, during their 38-year rule over the western part of it.
